= Ben Hogan =

American professional golfer (1912–1997)

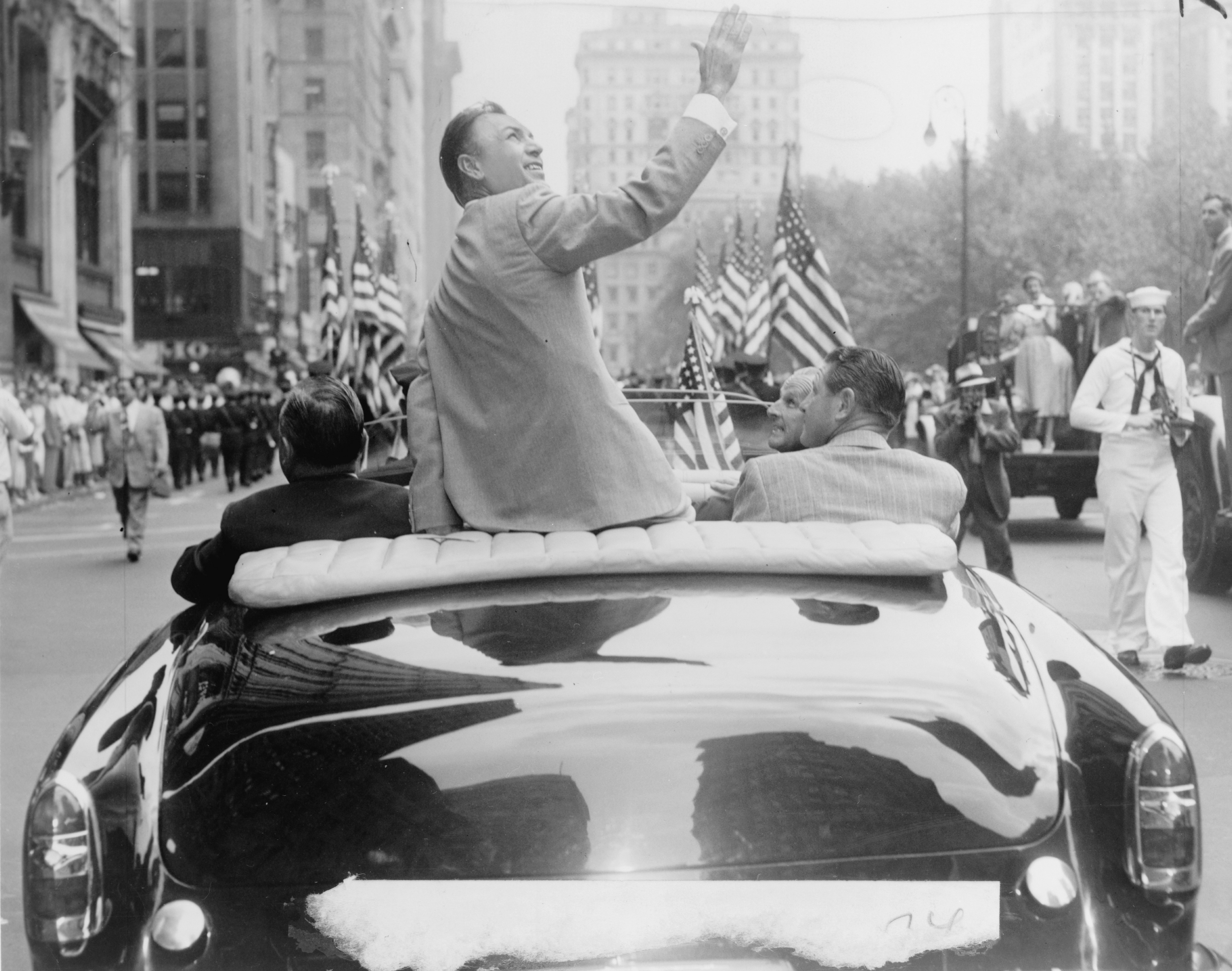
- Hogan in New York City in 1953

Personal information
- Full name: William Ben Hogan
- Nicknames: The Hawk, Bantam Ben, The Wee Iceman
- Nationality: United States
- Born: August 13, 1912 Stephenville, Texas, U.S.
- Died: July 25, 1997 (aged 84) Fort Worth, Texas, U.S.
- Height: 5 ft 8 1/2 in (1.74 m)
- Weight: 145 lb (66 kg; 10.4 st)
- Spouse: Valerie Fox (m. 1935)

Career
- Sport: Golf
- Turned professional: 1930
- Former tour: PGA Tour
- Professional wins: 69

Number of wins by tour
- PGA Tour: 64 (4th all-time)
- Other: 5

Best results in major championships (wins: 9)
- Masters Tournament: Won: 1951, 1953
- PGA Championship: Won: 1946, 1948
- U.S. Open: Won: 1948, 1950, 1951, 1953
- The Open Championship: Won: 1953

Achievements and awards
- World Golf Hall of Fame: 1974 (member page)
- PGA Tour leading money winner: 1940, 1941, 1942, 1946, 1948
- PGA Player of the Year: 1948, 1950, 1951, 1953
- Vardon Trophy: 1940, 1941, 1948
- Associated Press Male Athlete of the Year: 1953
- Hickok Belt: 1953
- Bob Jones Award: 1976

Ben Hogan
- Military career
- Allegiance: United States
- Branch: U.S. Army Air Forces
- Service years: 1943–1945
- Rank: Captain
- Unit: Fort Worth Army Air Field

William Ben Hogan (August 13, 1912 – July 25, 1997) was an American professional golfer who is considered to be one of the greatest players in the history of the game. He profoundly influenced golf swing theory, and was noted for his ballstriking skill and assiduous practice. Hogan won nine major championships and is one of six men to complete the modern career grand slam.

Hogan was introduced to golf through caddying at age 11 and turned professional aged 17. He struggled at the start of his career and did not win a professional tournament until he was 26. After serving in the U.S. Army Air Forces from 1943 to 1945, Hogan claimed his first major championship at the 1946 PGA Championship, which was one of his 13 tournament victories that year. He won the 1948 U.S. Open with a record score of 8-under 276.

In 1949, Hogan sustained near-fatal injuries in a head-on collision with a bus while driving home from a tournament. He recovered and returned to golf, winning the 1950 U.S. Open in what became known as the "miracle at Merion". Hogan achieved the Triple Crown in 1953, with victories at the Masters Tournament, the U.S. Open and the Open Championship. In total, he won 64 professional tournaments recognized as PGA Tour events.

Outside of playing golf, Hogan started his own equipment company and authored Ben Hogan's Five Lessons, which became one of the most influential and best-selling golf books. He was named an inaugural inductee to the World Golf Hall of Fame in 1974.

== Early life ==
William Ben Hogan was born in Stephenville, Texas, on August 13, 1912. He was the third and youngest child of Clara (née Williams) and Chester Hogan. The family lived in nearby Dublin, Texas, where Chester worked as a blacksmith. Hogan's grandfather and namesake William Hogan was a blacksmith for the 1st Mississippi Cavalry Regiment in the American Civil War. The Hogans were of Irish descent. After the war, William worked as a tenant farmer then moved from Mississippi to Dublin, Texas, where Hogan's father Chester was born in 1885. William opened a blacksmith shop in Dublin. Chester worked as a bottler at Dublin Dr Pepper, before inheriting William's blacksmith shop. As a child, Hogan (who went by the name Ben) spent much of his time around the shop, where he was regarded as a shy but polite boy who calmed horses which were in line to be shoed.

As the blacksmith trade declined due to automobiles replacing horses, Chester spiraled into debt; Hogan biographer James Dodson stated Chester "became so despondent that he could barely lift a hammer". In 1921, the family sold their house in Dublin and rented a small house in downtown Fort Worth, where Clara worked as a seamstress to support the family and arranged for Chester to be treated by a doctor for his "black moods". On February 13, 1922, Chester shot himself with a .38 revolver in the family home in Fort Worth. By some accounts, Hogan was in the same room as his father at that time, although Dodson noted this was uncertain as the Hogan family afterwards refused to discuss the incident and contemporary newspapers gave conflicting reports whether Hogan witnessed his father's suicide or not. He had regarded his father as his hero and he could not bear to see him in a casket during the funeral. The suicide troubled Hogan for the remainder of his life.

The family incurred financial difficulties after Chester's suicide, and the children took jobs to help their mother make ends meet. Hogan's brother Royal quit school aged 14 and delivered office supplies, sold copies of the Fort Worth Star-Telegram on street corners, pumped gasoline at a service station, and later took night classes to study accounting. Clara described Royal as her "rock of Gibraltar" and said he was crucial to sustaining the family. Nine-year-old Hogan also sold newspaper copies at a nearby train station, and his sister Princess helped by babysitting local children. In a 1983 interview with Ken Venturi, Hogan said he was grateful for his difficult childhood:

Because I know tough things, and I had a tough day all my life, and I can handle tough things. ... And every day that I progressed was a joy for me, and I recognized that. I don't think I could have done what I've done if I hadn't had the tough days to begin with.

== Introduction to golf ==
A tip from a friend led Hogan to caddying at age 11 at Glen Garden Country Club in Fort Worth. He walked seven miles each way to the club. Hogan was enticed by hearing caddies could make $0.65 (equivalent to $12 in 2025) per round. Glen Garden had a driving range and the members rarely used it, which meant caddies were free to hit balls while waiting for a bag to carry. Hogan hit more balls than any other caddie. He received pointers from the club professional Ted Longworth on basics such as gripping the club. Outside of this, Hogan was self-taught through watching the swings of the players he caddied for and through trial and error.

Hogan did not show natural ability at golf, but had an intense work ethic and improved rapidly. Caddies at Glen Garden had a game where the shortest hitter would have to retrieve all the balls from the range, which motivated Hogan to become a long hitter despite his slight stature. In his attempt to gain distance, he began hooking the ball, a tendency which plagued him for years afterwards. Hogan's mother Clara initially discouraged him from golf as she did not see a future in it. She unfavorably compared him to his older brother and said Hogan's golf was "nothing", adding that "nothing divided by nothing is nothing", a phrase which Hogan later used throughout his life. He persisted with golf despite the criticism. Hogan also attempted to play American football but he proved too small, and baseball did not pique his interest. He later said: "Why golf did I do not know, but I just loved it." After seeing Walter Hagen arrive in an extravagant car and clothing for the 1927 PGA Championship in Dallas, Hogan decided that "if golf could make it possible for a fellow to live like that, then I would have a fling at it myself."

One of Hogan's fellow caddies at Glen Garden was future major champion Byron Nelson, who was six months older than Hogan. The two became friends, but never close friends. At the annual Christmas caddie tournament in 1927, when both were 15, Nelson sank a 30-foot (9.1 m) putt on the final hole to tie the match and force a playoff. Hogan had a putt to win the match on the first extra hole, but he then was informed the format had changed from sudden death to a nine-hole playoff. He ultimately lost the playoff on the final green, after Nelson holed another long putt. Hogan later said that he felt Nelson had received preferential treatment at Glen Garden. When Nelson was chosen to receive junior membership at Glen Garden instead of him the following year, Hogan became determined to surpass Nelson.

Once he turned 16 and reached the age-limit for caddying, Hogan began working in Glen Garden's golf shop, where he repaired and polished clubs. He recalled of this time: "Boy, I'd look at those clubs and they were the most beautiful things, Nichols and Stewarts, all made in Scotland. I got my own set of mongrel clubs out of a dime store barrel for a dollar a piece." As he was no longer a caddie and had not received membership, Hogan was not allowed to practice at Glen Garden. He instead practiced at the nearest public course, Katy Lake. In September 1928, Hogan competed in a match play championship held at River Crest Country Club in Fort Worth. He made eagle on the final hole to force extra holes against defending champion M. L. "Happy" Massingill, but was eliminated on the 19th hole. Hogan also impressed in the tournament's long-drive contest, leading fellow competitor Ed Stewart to say of the 130-pound (59 kg) Hogan: "It's a good thing that kid don't weigh about 170." As a Christmas present in 1928, Clara bought Hogan a set of clubs. She later stated that, upon receiving the clubs, Hogan proclaimed: "Mama, I'm going to be the greatest golfer that ever lived."

In 1929, while still in high school, Hogan won the Cleburne Invitational at Cleburne Country Club, where he defeated 52-year-old John Douglas in the final. This was Hogan's first win in a significant tournament. In July of that year, he finished second in the Southwest Amateur in Shreveport, Louisiana, losing in the final to Gus Moreland. Hogan then won the Dublin-DeLeon tournament in August. He shot a course-record 68 to advance to the final, where he defeated George Meredith. This was Hogan's last amateur victory before turning professional. By this stage, he was prioritizing golf ahead of his formal education. He decided to drop out of Central High School in Fort Worth and attempt to become a professional golfer. Hogan persuaded his mother that he would make up for his lack of a diploma by doubling his efforts to read newspapers and books.

== Turns professional ==
=== 1930–1936: Early struggles ===
As a 17-year-old, Hogan was hired as an assistant at Oakhurst Country Club, a nine-hole course in downtown Fort Worth. The job paid less than $30 (equivalent to $563 in 2025) per week, but it permitted him to practice whenever customers were not around. Hogan made his professional tournament debut in January 1930 at the Texas Open, a PGA Tour event held at Brackenridge Park Golf Course in San Antonio. He hitched a ride from Fort Worth and paid $5 (equivalent to $96 in 2025) as a registration fee. Amidst the Great Depression, Hogan felt that he could not afford to spend time playing amateur tournaments, remarking: "You can't eat trophies." He shot rounds of 78-75 and withdrew. He stated afterwards: "I found out the first day that I shouldn't even be there." A week later, Hogan competed in the Houston Open, where he shot 77-76 and again withdrew.

Hogan returned to Fort Worth and took on various jobs, such as mopping floors in a restaurant and bellhopping at the Blackstone Hotel. He also worked as a croupier at night at the hotel, a job which he became ashamed of and was reluctant to mention afterwards. Hogan continued his diligent practice. He would practice to the point that his hands bled, and once the skin blistered and cracked open he soaked his hands in pickle brine to toughen them. He made his second attempt to play on tour in late 1931, having received $75 (equivalent to $1,588 in 2025): 25 from his brother, and 50 from businessman Marvin Leonard, whom Hogan had met while caddying at Glen Garden. He joined fellow Texan Ralph Guldahl and headed west.

At the Pasadena Open In December 1931, Hogan failed to finish inside the money as he struggled with a smother hook. Sponsors of the tournament gave competitors a bag of oranges, which he lived off for a week. He earned his first check as a professional in January 1932 at the Los Angeles Open, shooting 71-72-79-69 to receive $50 (equivalent to $1,180 in 2025). He cashed another check at the Agua Caliente Open, shooting 295 over four rounds to earn $200. He also placed in the money at the Phoenix Open, which Guldahl won. Hogan then followed the tour east, but had little success. Paying for his own food, transportation and accommodation while on the road, he soon whittled away his earnings and returned to Texas broke. Hogan then secured a position as club professional at Nolan River Country Club, a small club in Cleburne, Texas. He received $35 (equivalent to $826 in 2025) per week, and rented a room in the back of the club at a nominal price. At Nolan River, Hogan spent a significant amount of his time in the golf shop reshafting clubs from hickory to steel, which gave him a deeper understanding of club construction and mechanics. The club had few members and he rarely was requested to give formal lessons, leaving him ample time to practice and attempt to fix his tendency towards snap hooks.

Hogan made two more failed attempts to play on tour in 1933 and 1934. In the latter attempt, he made his first appearance in a major championship, at the 1934 U.S. Open held at Merion Golf Club, where he shot 79-79 to miss the cut. Hogan married Valerie Fox in 1935, and considered quitting the sport as he felt that he was failing to provide for his wife by unsuccessfully pursuing a career as a touring professional. She refused to let him quit and functioned as a form of sports psychologist. He recalled: "She kept saying, 'You can't give up now. You're so close. I just know it'." Hogan's mother later stated that "Valerie is the only one who can honestly say, 'I told you so.' The rest of us hoped Ben would make it, but Valerie was always sure he would." Hogan qualified for the 1936 U.S. Open at Baltusrol Golf Club, where he again missed the cut, shooting 75-79.

=== 1937–1941: Breakthrough on tour ===
After amassing $1,400 (equivalent to $31,354 in 2025) in savings, Hogan made another attempt to play on tour beginning in 1937. He brought Valerie along with him, as his "secretary, treasurer, and wardrobe mistress". By the time he entered the Oakland Open at Sequoyah Country Club in January 1938, they were down to $86. They stayed at the Leamington Hotel in Oakland, and Hogan parked his car across the street to avoid paying the hotel's parking fee. When he exited the hotel on the morning of the first round, he discovered that his car's wheels had been stolen. Childhood friend and fellow competitor Byron Nelson gave him a ride to the course. Hogan ultimately finished the tournament in sixth-place, shooting a final-round 67 to earn $285. This enabled him to continue playing on tour.

At the Sacramento Open the following week, Hogan finished third and received $350 (equivalent to $8,005 in 2025). He then received an offer to become assistant professional at Century Country Club in Purchase, New York, a wealthy club which offered him a comfortable salary. Two months later, Hogan made his debut at the 1938 Masters Tournament, where he finished tied-25th. In September of that year, he partnered with Vic Ghezzi to win the Hershey Four-Ball. The pair opened with a best-ball 61, and Hogan made 31 birdies in the 126-hole tournament, six more than anyone else in the field. Despite holding a large lead, he remained determined and emotionless on the final holes. Ghezzi remarked that: "If we had lost, I am quite certain that [Hogan] would have jumped out of a window." This was Hogan's first professional victory, and they earned $1,100 (equivalent to $25,160 in 2025). Hogan ended the year at 13th in the PGA Tour's money list, and he later stated this was the turning point of his career.

Hogan had been invited to the Hershey Four-Ball thanks to Henry Picard, who convinced the organizers at Hershey Country Club that the as-yet-winless Hogan was a talented player. Picard also helped Hogan by advising him that weakening his grip might alleviate the tendency to hook the ball. Hogan had received a similar tip to cure the hook in 1937 from Harry Cooper, who noticed that Hogan was letting go of the club slightly at the top of his backswing then regripping it stronger during the downswing than he had done at address. Hogan continued to have success on tour in 1939. He finished runner-up at the Phoenix Open in February, and ninth at the 1939 Masters Tournament in April. Hogan made the cut for the first time at the 1939 U.S. Open, held at Philadelphia Country Club in June, which was won by Nelson. Although he did not win during the year, Hogan recorded 16 top-10 finishes and placed seventh on the money list.

Hogan's significant breakthrough came in 1940. He recorded his first individual win in a professional tournament at the North and South Open in March, held at Pinehurst No. 2 in North Carolina. He shot a record 11-under 277 to finish three shots ahead of runner-up Sam Snead. Hogan followed this with a nine-stroke win at the Greater Greensboro Open the next week. He added his third straight win at the Asheville Land of the Sky Open at the end of March, shooting 67-68-69-69 to win by three strokes. Although he had previously struggled on the greens, Hogan displayed top-class putting during this winning streak. During the trophy presentation at Pinehurst, Hogan said: "They've kidded me about practicing so much. I'd go out there before a round and practice, and when I was through I'd practice some more. Well, they can kid me all they want because it finally paid off." Hogan added his fourth win of the year at the Goodall Palm Beach Round Robin in May, and ended 1940 as the PGA Tour's money list leader, with over $10,000 (equivalent to $229,810 in 2025) in earnings. He also received the Vardon Trophy for lowest scoring average.

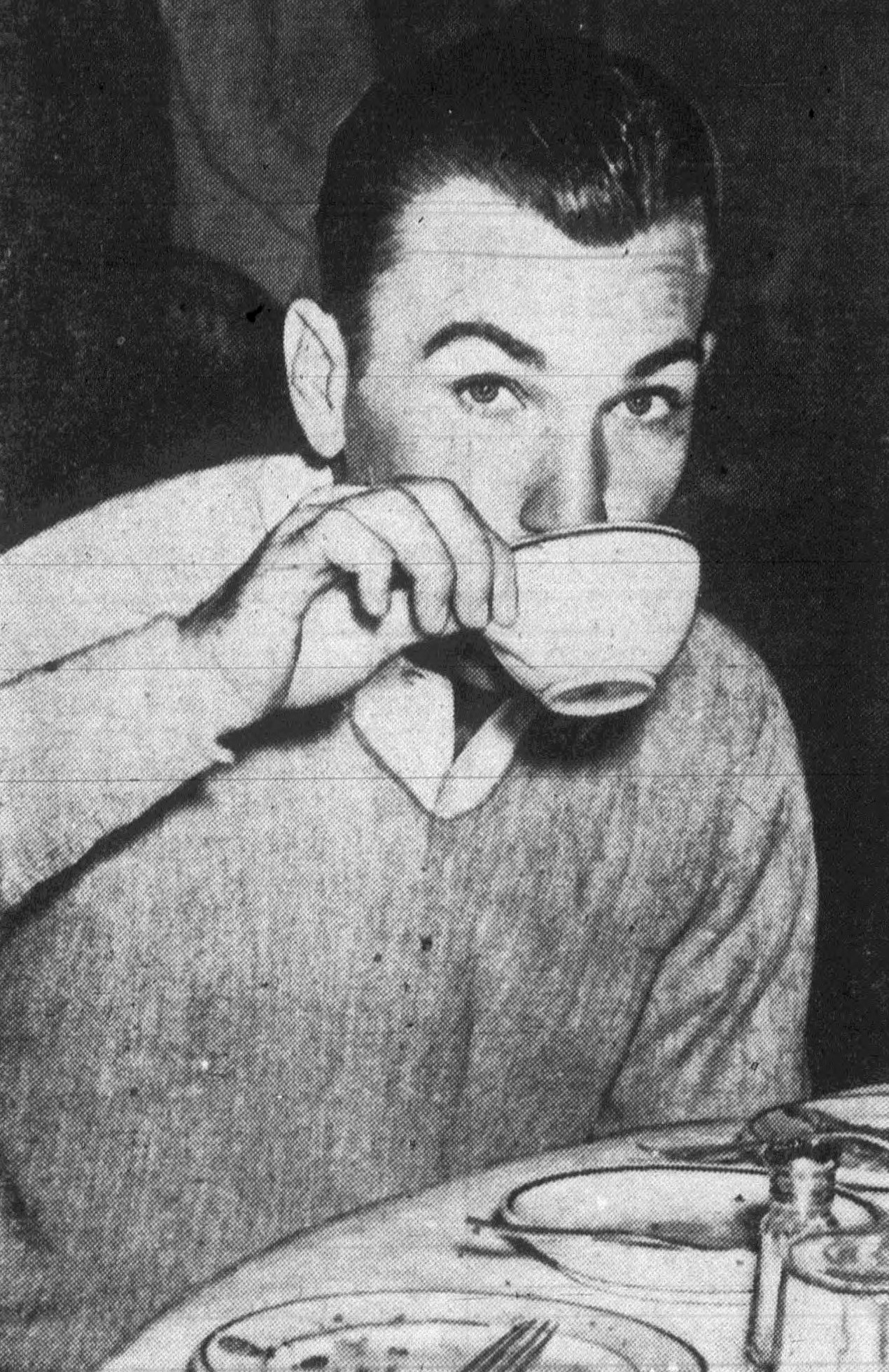
Hogan in September 1941

In 1941, Hogan was hired as head professional at Hershey Country Club. He filled the vacancy left by Picard, who recommended that Hogan receive the job. He did not give lessons, and his role was largely ceremonial in that he would represent Hershey while playing tournaments and visit the club to give the members a close-up look at an elite golfer's swing. He received annual payment in the region of $4,000 (equivalent to $87,557 in 2025). Members at Hershey recalled that Hogan had a meticulous attitude towards practice, focusing on each shot on the range as he would during a tournament. During the year, Hogan had eleven runner-up finishes and won five times, including at the Hershey Open. He again topped the tour's money list, with over $18,000 (equivalent to $394,005 in 2025), and won the Vardon Trophy for a second time. Despite this, he stated that he was not yet satisfied with his play.

=== 1942–1945: Hale America Open victory and military service ===
Hogan started 1942 by winning the Los Angeles Open and the San Francisco Open in January. At the Texas Open in February, he finished runner-up for the third consecutive year. Hogan won his second North and South Open in March, and his third consecutive Asheville Land of the Sky Open at the start of April. The following week, at the 1942 Masters Tournament, Hogan shot 67 on Saturday, the lowest round of the day by four strokes, to move into contention. He shot 2-under 70 in the final round to finish in a tie for first alongside Byron Nelson. In the ensuing 18-hole playoff, Hogan shot 70 but was defeated by one stroke. This extended Hogan's drought in the majors.

Due to World War II, the U.S. Open was cancelled in 1942. In its place, the USGA and the PGA of America organized the Hale America Open in June. Subject to the same open qualifying system as the U.S. Open, it drew over 1,000 attempted qualifiers and the field included many of the top players on tour. It was held at Chicago's Ridgemoor Country Club, which was not a U.S. Open venue. Hogan opened with a 72, then followed with a 10-under 62 to take the lead. He shot 69-68 on the weekend to win by three strokes ahead of Jimmy Demaret and Mike Turnesa. Hogan was presented with the gold medal as traditionally given to a U.S. Open champion by USGA director Joseph Dey. Due to these factors, Hogan's supporters and some golf historians considered this to be a major championship victory for Hogan. Officially, the tournament is not recognized as a major championship. The event was recognized as a PGA Tour victory, and helped Hogan end the year as the tour's money list leader for the third consecutive year.

Hogan did not play a tournament in 1943. He received his draft notice on March 1, and was inducted into the United States Army Air Forces on March 25. Hogan served in non-combat roles during the war. He was admitted to Officer Candidate School in Miami; he passed and was promoted to second lieutenant later that year. He then returned to Fort Worth and joined the Civilian Pilot Training Program unit, where he received $225 (equivalent to $4,186 in 2025) per month. When aviators returning from overseas arrived in Fort Worth, they were deemed more qualified flight instructors, so Hogan's responsibilities decreased. He was afforded time to continue practicing golf and was permitted to play a handful of events when the tour resumed in 1944, including the Chicago Victory Open in June, where he lost in a playoff to Jug McSpaden. He also offered golf instruction to returning pilots who had been wounded in action. Shortly before being honorably discharged on August 5, 1945, Hogan was promoted to the rank of captain. He received a personal letter of gratitude from President Harry S. Truman.

While Hogan was enlisted, Byron Nelson, who was exempt from military service, established himself as the leading player on tour. Nelson won eight tournaments in 1944, and eighteen in 1945, including an unprecedented eleven-straight victories. At the Nashville Invitational in September 1945, Hogan won his first tournament since being drafted, shooting 19-under to win by four ahead of Nelson and Johnny Bulla. Later that month, at the Portland Open Invitational, he won again, finishing 14 strokes clear of runner-up Nelson. Hogan's score of 27-under 261 broke the PGA Tour scoring record in relation to par; this record stood for 53 years, until John Huston shot 28-under at the Hawaiian Open in 1998. Hogan ultimately won five tournaments in his return to the tour in 1945, the last being the Orlando Open in December.

=== 1946–1948: Establishing dominance, first major titles ===
Hogan won four tournaments in the first three months of 1946, including the Texas Open. He entered the 1946 Masters Tournament among the favorites to win, and two of Augusta National's members had bet $50,000 (equivalent to $825,512 in 2025) on Hogan at 4/1 odds. Outsider Herman Keiser led wire-to-wire to claim victory, one stroke ahead of Hogan. The following month, Hogan won the inaugural Colonial National Invitation, held at Colonial Country Club in Fort Worth. At the 1946 U.S. Open in June, Hogan had a short-range putt on the final green to enter a playoff, but missed it and finished in tied-fourth. He rebounded with a win at the Inverness Invitational Four-Ball the next week.

Ahead of the 1946 PGA Championship at Portland Golf Club in August, defending champion Byron Nelson announced that he planned to retire from full-time professional golf. Hogan and Nelson were seeded on opposite sides of the draw, so a showdown in the final between the two was possible, but Nelson was eliminated by Porky Oliver. Hogan dispatched Jimmy Demaret, 10 and 9, to reach the final, where he then defeated Oliver, 6 and 4, to win his first major championship. Aged 34, the victory came 17 years after Hogan had turned professional. In total, Hogan played 32 tournaments in 1946. He made the cut in all 32 events and recorded 27 top-10 finishes, including 13 wins. He claimed the title as money list leader for the fourth time in his career, with over $42,000 (equivalent to $693,430 in 2025) in earnings. As Nelson had retired and Sam Snead won only once between December 1946 and March 1949, Hogan established himself as the dominant player on tour.

Partially influenced by Nelson's early retirement, Hogan reduced his tournament schedule in 1947 to avoid potential burnout. He continued his form from 1946 and won four tournaments at the start of the year. Regarding his success, he proclaimed to a sportswriter: "I've found the secret." He did not initially reveal the secret, and it became the subject of much speculation. He added three more tournament victories in 1947 after announcing this epiphany. Hogan was chosen as a playing-captain at the 1947 Ryder Cup in November, the first edition of the contest since 1937. The United States trounced Great Britain 11–1. Hogan ended 1947 third in the money list, behind Bobby Locke and leader Jimmy Demaret.

Hogan opened 1948 with a win at the Los Angeles Open held at Riviera Country Club. He led wire-to-wire, shooting a record 9-under 275 to win by four strokes ahead of Lloyd Mangrum. Hogan added his second major title at the 1948 PGA Championship, held at Norwood Hills Country Club in May. He defeated Mike Turnesa, 7 and 6, in the final. In this era, the PGA Championship was a grueling 216-hole, seven-day format. After his win, Hogan was exhausted and stated he might not play the PGA Championship again. In June, Hogan competed in the 1948 U.S. Open, which was also held at Riviera Country Club. He opened with a 4-under 67 to take the lead, but was overtaken by Sam Snead in the second round. Hogan rallied with 68-69 on the 36-hole final day to win his first U.S. Open and third major championship title. His total of 276 shattered the U.S. Open scoring record previously held by Ralph Guldahl's 281 in 1937. Hogan's aggregate score of 8-under also set a new U.S. Open record, which stood until Tiger Woods shot 12-under in 2000. With the win, Hogan became the first man to win the PGA Championship and U.S. Open in the same year since Gene Sarazen in 1922.

Following his victory at the U.S. Open, Hogan won five more consecutive tournaments. He was sponsored by equipment company MacGregor Golf at the time, and MacGregor awarded him matching prize money for each of his victories, which averaged $2,090 (equivalent to $28,007 in 2025) during this streak. After the final victory of the streak, at the Denver Open Invitational in August, Hogan signed his scorecard and walked off the course before the trophy presentation. He also refused numerous media requests during this time and the Associated Press issued a report on the incident, which led to negative coverage of Hogan. Biographer Curt Sampson remarked that "Hogan was extraordinarily driven and had no particular interest in savoring a win in public or in public relations. He was a shy man trying to hide while everyone watched, a sad impossibility." Hogan added two more wins before the end of the year. In total, he played 25 events in 1948, finishing in the top-three in 17 of them, including 10 wins. He won the inaugural PGA Player of the Year award, and topped the tour's money list for the fifth and final time of his career, with over $30,000 (equivalent to $402,008 in 2025).

== Life-threatening accident ==
In January 1949, Hogan won the Bing Crosby Pro-Am held at Pebble Beach Golf Links. He won again the following week at the Long Beach Open, and finished runner-up at the Phoenix Open at the end of the month. Afterwards, Hogan decided to drive home to Fort Worth in his new Cadillac Sedan.

On the morning of February 2, Hogan and his wife Valerie were driving along a narrow, two-lane bridge near Van Horn, Texas. Hogan had slowed down to under 30 mph (48 km/h) due to fog limiting visibility. At 8:30, a Greyhound Bus 548, whose driver was running late, attempted to overtake a truck by entering the oncoming lane and collided head-on with Hogan's car. The bus weighed approximately 20,000 pounds (9,100 kg) and was traveling at around 50 mph (80 km/h). Moments before the collision, Hogan saw the approaching headlights and let go of the steering wheel to dive in front of Valerie. Hogan would likely have been killed if he had not done so, as the steering column shot through the car upon collision. The edge of the steering wheel nevertheless fractured Hogan's left collarbone, and it was followed by the Cadillac's engine, which snapped his left ankle and crushed his left leg. He also suffered a fractured pelvis, fractured rib, damage to his left eye, and injuries to his internal organs due to the force of the impact. Valerie, who had suffered less severe injuries, managed to exit the car and then remove Hogan from the mangled front seat with the help of two people who had stopped to investigate the scene. The bus had continued onwards until plowing into an embankment several hundred feet past the crash site. None of the passengers in the bus or any other vehicles on the road suffered serious injuries.

A nurse who happened to be on scene recognized that Hogan was descending into circulatory shock after he was removed from the car. He lost and regained consciousness several times before an ambulance arrived around 90 minutes later from El Paso. He was transported to Hôtel-Dieu Hospital in El Paso, where he underwent X-rays before being placed in plaster casts. Valerie was interviewed by reporters who gathered outside the hospital and the detail that Hogan had dove across his wife in an attempt to save her dominated newspapers, with headlines such as "Hogan's Greatest Win - Saving His Gal Val". While in hospital, Hogan received thousands of get-well-soon messages from strangers. Hogan's niece Jackie recalled: "Ben really was genuinely startled to discover what he meant to millions of people he'd never met. He simply had no idea how and why they cared about him." Hogan had previously been regarded as aloof and cold, and the incident caused a sea change in his public image. Regarding the notion that his reason for diving in front of Valerie was to save her, Hogan later said: "That was a bunch of bullshit. I was trying to get out of the way of the bus."

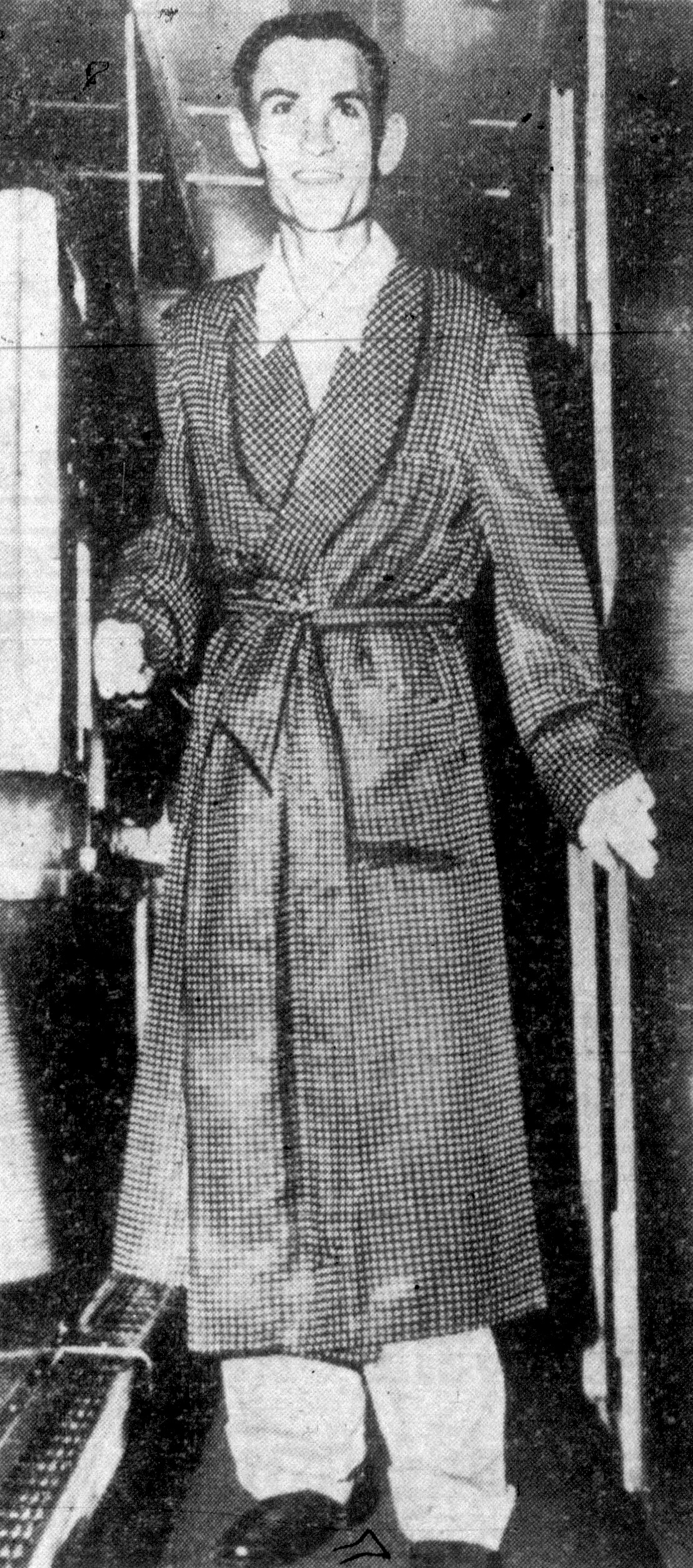
Hogan during his 1949 hospital stay

Hogan's condition quickly improved from "critical" to "fair" to "good", and he was informed that he would soon be able to leave the hospital. However, on February 18, Hogan reported a sharp pain in his chest and it was determined that blood clots were traveling from his damaged left leg towards his lungs, creating the threat of a pulmonary embolism. Attempts to thin Hogan's blood proved ineffective so the decision was made to have an emergency operation. Alton Ochsner, regarded as the top vascular surgeon in the country, accepted the request but was unable to fly from New Orleans to El Paso due to a rainstorm. U.S. Air Force brigadier general David William Hutchison agreed to a plea from Hogan's family to send a B-29 to transport Ochsner. The surgery lasted around two hours and Ochsner successfully ligated Hogan's inferior vena cava. Hogan left the hospital at the start of April and returned home by train to Fort Worth. During his hospital stay, Hogan was asked by a journalist if he would return to golf: "I'm going to try. ... You work for perfection all your life, and then something like this happens. My nervous system has been all shot by this, and I don't see how I can readjust it to competitive golf. But you can bet I'll be back there swinging."

As a result of his broken collarbone, Hogan experienced regular pain in his left shoulder for the remainder of his life. Blood flow to his legs was also permanently restricted, which caused discomfort and pain. His doctors were skeptical that he would ever walk independently again, let alone play golf. They advised that it would take around five months before the swelling in his legs subsided and informed him that his muscles had atrophied. By April 17, Hogan walked a half-block around Westover Hills with the aid of a cane and assistance from a nurse. After a promising evaluation from Ochsner on April 30, Hogan doubled his recovery efforts. He mailed an entry form for the 1949 U.S. Open in June, but was unable to participate. While the U.S. Open was ongoing, the driver of the Greyhound bus which collided with Hogan was on trial for aggravated assault and failure to yield the right-of-way. He was found responsible but received the minimum penalty: a fine and legal costs which totaled only $127 (equivalent to $1,718 in 2025). Separately, Hogan reached an undisclosed financial settlement with Greyhound. It was reported that he received $25,000 (equivalent to $338,287 in 2025) a year for life in compensation. Later in 1949, the driver of the Greyhound bus was involved in another crash, which resulted in two deaths and 34 injuries.

By September 1949, Hogan had recovered enough to travel aboard the RMS Queen Elizabeth to England, where he was selected as non-playing captain for the United States at the 1949 Ryder Cup held at Ganton Golf Club. More than a ceremonial captain, Hogan demanded his players to wake earlier than usual and practice before and after each match. The American team rallied on the final day to win by a score of 7–5. Upon his return to Fort Worth, Hogan began hitting full shots on the practice range. He experienced significant pain when shifting weight during the swing, but this lessened over time. He played eighteen holes for the first time since the crash on December 10, at Colonial Country Club with the aid of a scooter, which he reluctantly rode on in between shots. Two weeks later, he registered to make his return to the tour and play the Los Angeles Open.

== Return to golf ==
=== 1950: Miracle at Merion ===
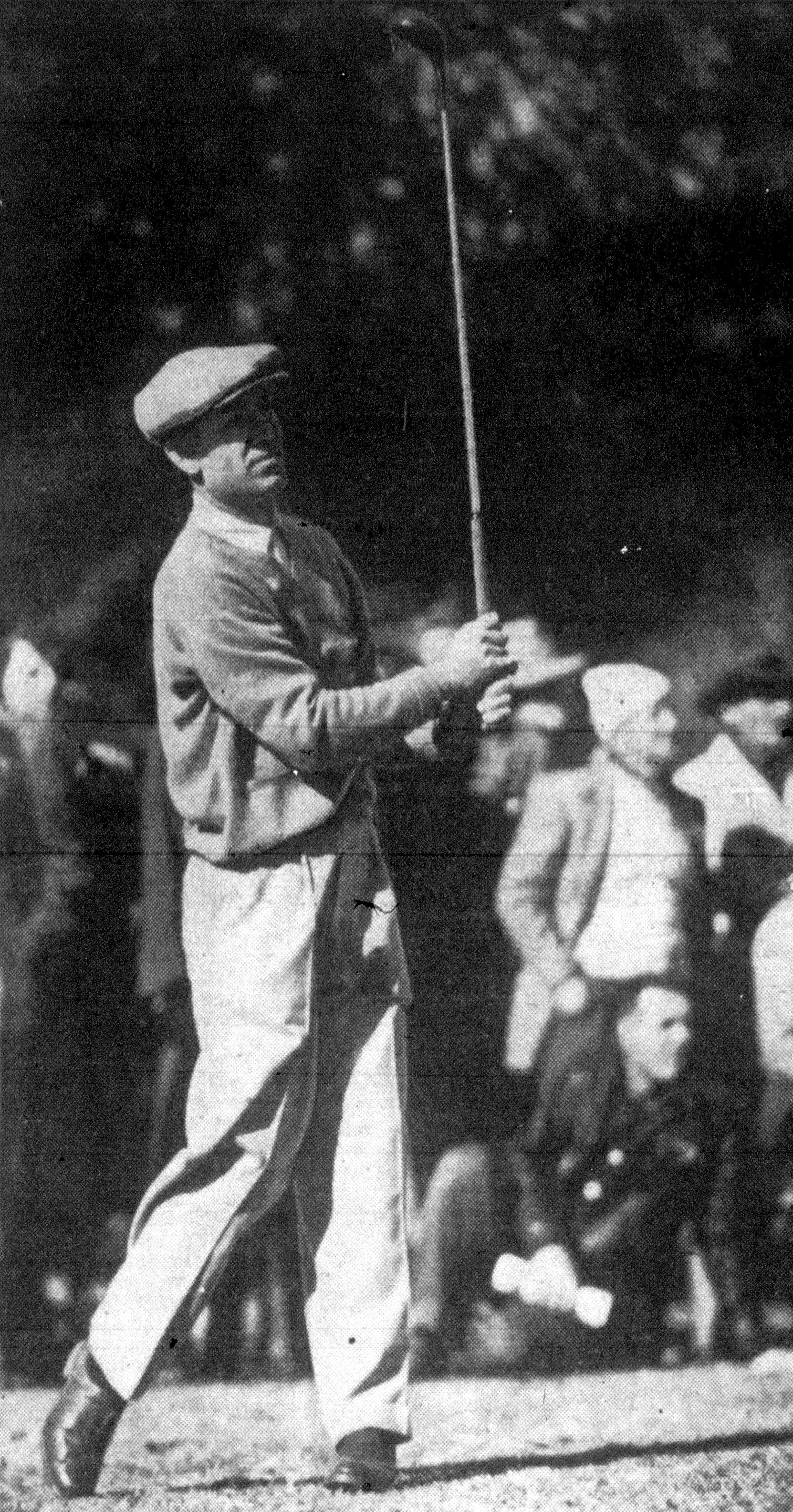
Hogan at the 1950 Los Angeles Open

Hogan played in his first tournament since the car crash in January 1950, at the Los Angeles Open held at Riviera Country Club. He opened with a 73, then followed with three consecutive rounds of 69 to post 4-under 280. Sam Snead birdied the 17th and 18th holes to match Hogan's score and force a playoff. A member of Riviera recalled that, during the fourth round, Hogan "was telling me his arms felt like wet noodles and he was in some kind of pain on every step." In the playoff, Hogan shot a 5-over 76 and was defeated by Snead, who shot 72. Sportswriter Grantland Rice wrote: "[Hogan's] legs simply were not strong enough to carry his heart any longer." Two weeks later, he played in the Phoenix Open, which was ceremonially named the "Ben Hogan Open". He shot 65 in the first round, but faltered with three over-par rounds and finished tied-20th. Hogan did not play again until the 1950 Masters Tournament in April, where he finished in a tie for fourth. He recorded his first victory of the season at the Greenbrier Pro-Am in May, shooting 64-64-65-66 to total 21-under 259 and win by 10 strokes ahead of Snead.

Despite his successful return to tournament play, Hogan struggled with near-blindness in his left eye which had been damaged in the crash, a condition which he refused to mention to the press. He also experienced constant pain while on the course. As a result, Hogan dramatically reduced his tournament schedule. Previously he had averaged around 30 tournaments per year, but now he could only play five or so. To compensate for the lack of tournament play, Hogan underwent pre-round preparations that lasted four hours. In the mornings, he soaked in hot water and Epsom salt. He followed this by consuming large amounts of aspirin, wrapped his legs in bandages to prevent swelling, had breakfast, then started his lengthy practice routine.

At the 1950 U.S. Open held at Merion Golf Club, Hogan opened with a 2-over 72 on Thursday. His legs began to cramp on the back nine on Friday, but he played through severe pain and carded a 69 to trail the lead by two shots heading into the 36-hole final day. As he had a 9:30 tee time the next morning, Hogan woke at 5 a.m. to undergo his pre-round preparations. In the morning round, he shot a 72 and remained two strokes off the lead, which was held by the 1946 U.S. Open champion Lloyd Mangrum. In the afternoon round, Hogan's 37 on the front nine was enough to claim the lead, as his competitors all struggled. With nine holes remaining, most of the 13,000 spectators on the course were following Hogan. After climbing the hill to the 12th tee and hitting his drive, Hogan visibly staggered and almost fell. He ultimately made bogey on the hole, and later recalled: "My legs had turned to stone." Hogan retained a two-shot lead on the 15th hole, but three-putted for bogey. He dropped another shot on the 230-yard (210 m) par-3 17th after finding the greenside bunker, meaning he required a par on the uphill, 458-yard (419 m) par-4 18th hole to force a playoff. After finding the fairway, Hogan still had 213 yards (195 m) remaining for his approach. He hit a 17-degree 1-iron to 40 feet (12 m) and two-putted for par to join the playoff alongside Mangrum and George Fazio. Hy Peskin of Sports Illustrated photographed Hogan playing his 1-iron approach to the green at the 72nd hole. It subsequently became one of the most famed images in golf history.

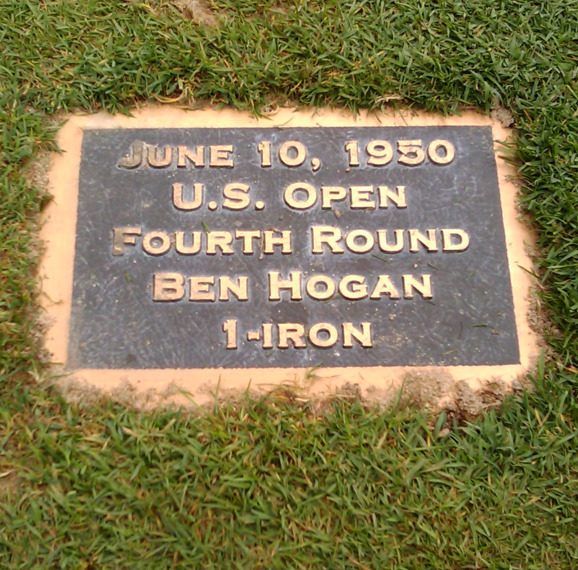
Plaque on the 18th fairway at Merion Golf Club marking Hogan's 1-iron shot in 1950

The 18-hole playoff was set for the following day. Hogan returned to the Barclay Hotel in Philadelphia and was rejuvenated by a good night's sleep. He fell behind early in the playoff after Mangrum birdied the 2nd hole, but thereafter never trailed. Hogan holed a 50-foot (15 m) putt for birdie on the 17th hole to establish a four-shot lead headed to the 18th hole, where he hit a 5-iron into the green and made par to win his second U.S. Open title. Just 16 months after his near-fatal car crash, Hogan had won what was generally considered the most important tournament in the golfing calendar at that time. It was immediately credited as one of the most impressive comeback achievements in sports history. Hogan's victory at the 1950 U.S. Open subsequently became known as the "miracle at Merion".

=== 1951–1952: Continued success, first Masters title ===
Hogan made his first start of 1951 at the Phoenix Open in January. He shot an opening round of 6-under 65 to take the lead, but was forced to withdraw due to intestinal influenza. Hogan did not return until April, at the 1951 Masters Tournament. After rounds of 70-72-70, Hogan was positioned in third place, one shot off the lead shared by Skee Riegel and Sam Snead. Hogan went out in 33, and built a two-shot lead after making birdie on the par-5 13th hole. He maintained this advantage headed to the 18th hole, where he holed a 4-foot (1.2 m) putt for par to shoot a bogey-free 68 and win his first Masters title. He was presented with the green jacket by Bobby Jones. When a reporter asked him which tournament he would like to win next, Hogan said: "If I never win another one, I'll be satisfied."

In his title defense at the 1951 U.S. Open held at Oakland Hills Country Club, Hogan started with a 6-over 76. Oakland Hills' South Course was a Donald Ross design but had been renovated by Robert Trent Jones prior to the U.S. Open to tighten the fairways and add more fairway bunkers; the course was subsequently dubbed "the Monster" by the media. Hogan said after his 76 that it was "the most stupid round of golf I ever played." He followed with a 73 and stood five strokes behind the lead. A third-round 71 on Saturday morning left Hogan in fifth-place at 10-over-par. In the final round on Saturday afternoon, Hogan decided to attack the course and almost holed multiple approach shots. He finished with a 15-foot (4.6 m) putt for birdie on the 459-yard (420 m) par-4 18th to shoot 67, the lowest round of the week, and retain his U.S. Open title. Afterwards, Hogan described it as "the finest round of golf I have ever played" and said "I'm glad I brought this course, this monster, to its knees."

Hogan played in only three tournaments in 1952. As the defending champion at the 1952 Masters Tournament in April, he was tied for the lead after 54 holes alongside Snead, but shot a 7-over 79 and finished in tied-7th. As part of the 79, he three-putted on five occasions. During that year, Hogan started the tradition of the Masters champions' dinner, after suggesting the idea to Bobby Jones and Clifford Roberts. He recalled: "They thought it would be a great idea, especially since I was the defending champion and would pick up the check." He won the Colonial National Invitation in May, and held the 36-hole lead at the 1952 U.S. Open in June, but shot 74-74 over the final two rounds to finish in third place.

=== 1953: Winning the Triple Crown ===
On the eve of the 1953 Masters Tournament in April, 40-year-old Hogan stated to a reporter: "I'm in grand shape. I practiced every day of the winter." He opened with a 2-under 70 in the first round, and followed with a 69 to take a one-shot lead at 5-under. Hogan extended his lead to four strokes thanks to a third-round 66, which also set the 54-hole scoring record at the tournament at 11-under 205. He closed out the tournament with a 69 on Sunday to claim the second Masters title of his career. His total of 14-under 274 broke the previous tournament record by five strokes. Hogan said afterwards: "That's as good as I can play." President Dwight D. Eisenhower flew to Augusta and two days later played the course together with Hogan, Byron Nelson, and Clifford Roberts. Eisenhower joked that: "Ben Hogan made fun of your course, didn't he, Cliff?"

In May, Hogan competed in the Pan American Open, for which he received an appearance fee of $5,000 (equivalent to $60,168 in 2025). He won the tournament by three strokes. Later that month, Hogan won the Colonial National Invitation for the fourth time in his career. He shot a final-round 67 to win by five strokes. Sportswriters quipped that the tournament should be renamed the "Colonial National Second Place Invitation" due to the difficulty other players had in defeating Hogan at the event.

Although he had won three of the previous five U.S. Opens, Hogan had to participate in 36-hole qualifying for the 1953 U.S. Open held at Oakmont Country Club in June due to the USGA's rules at the time. Biographer Curt Sampson stated that making Hogan play a qualifier for the U.S. Open was "like running a credit check on John D. Rockefeller, an insult and a waste of time." After qualifying, Hogan shot a bogey-free 67 to take the first-round lead. He retained his lead following rounds of 72-73, but his long-time rival Sam Snead had closed within one stroke. In the final round, Hogan drove the green on the 292-yard (267 m) par-4 17th hole to set up a birdie, then hit a 5-iron approach close to the pin on the 18th and rolled in the birdie putt to shoot 71. Hogan's total of 5-under 283 was six strokes clear of the runner-up Snead. With the victory, Hogan joined Willie Anderson and Bobby Jones as the only men to have won four U.S. Opens. Jack Nicklaus equaled this mark in 1980.

Towards the end of June, Hogan traveled across the Atlantic to compete in the 1953 Open Championship, held at Carnoustie Golf Links in Scotland. He arrived two weeks early in Scotland to practice on links courses and familiarize himself with the British-sized golf ball, which had a 1.62 in (41 mm) diameter compared to the American 1.68 in (43 mm) ball. He practiced at Panmure Golf Club, which afforded him more privacy than Carnoustie. In this era, the Open offered a prize pool that was a fraction of the American major championships. When asked why he chose to compete in the Open, Hogan said fellow major champions such as Tommy Armour and Walter Hagen had urged him to play. The 1953 PGA Championship was scheduled in the same week as the 1953 Open Championship, meaning it was impossible to compete in both.

Hogan initially was not fond of Carnoustie. He stated: "These greens are awful. It's like putting on glue. I've got a lawnmower back in Texas. I'll send it over to you." The Open Championship rules at the time also meant that Hogan had to participate in qualifying on July 6–7 despite his status as the reigning Masters and U.S. Open champion. He stated afterwards: "I kept asking myself, 'What am I doing over here?'" He felt pressure to perform and believed if he did not win, "people over there would have thought, 'Well, American players aren't so good as they're supposed to be, especially under British conditions'." Hogan made it through qualifying and shot a 1-over 73 in the first round. He struggled on the greens on the opening day and the struggles continued in the second round, but he shot 71 thanks to quality ballstriking and moved within two strokes of the lead. Hogan developed a flu prior to the 36-hole final day; he had a temperature of 103 °F (39 °C), but received a shot of penicillin and continued to play. He shot 70 in the third round to tie for the lead alongside Roberto De Vicenzo.

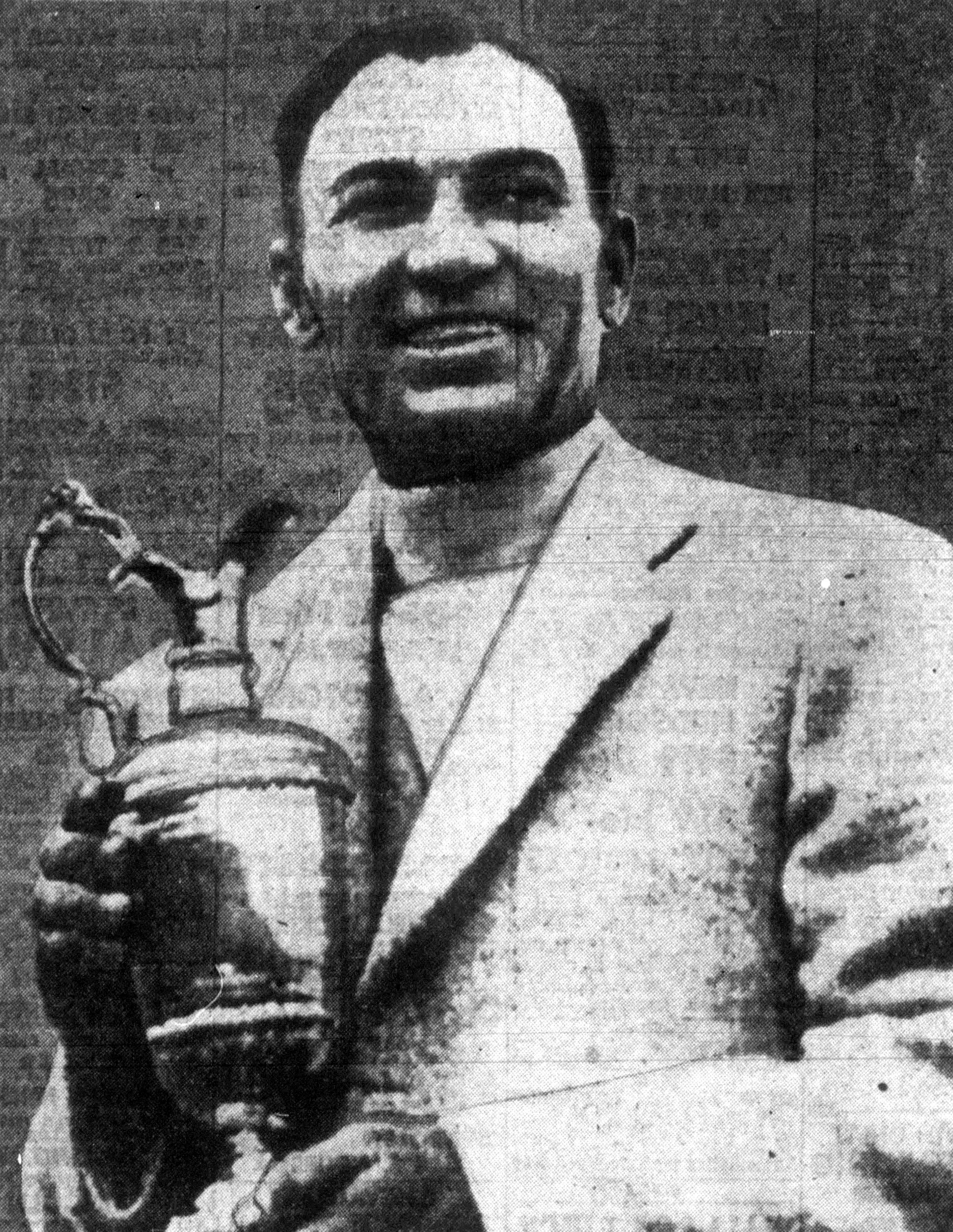
Hogan holding the Claret Jug in 1953

In the final round at Carnoustie, Hogan chipped in from 40 feet (12 m) for birdie on the 5th hole, then made another birdie at the par-5 6th. Hogan was notified he had a two-stroke lead while on the 15th hole, and after hitting his approach to 12 feet (3.7 m) on the 235-yard (215 m) par-3 16th, he told reporter John Derr: "This tournament's over. You can go in now and set up for the broadcast." Hogan finished with a birdie on the 18th hole to shoot a course-record 68 and claim the Claret Jug, totaling 6-under 282 to win by four strokes over Antonio Cerdá, Dai Rees, Frank Stranahan, and Peter Thomson. This made him the second golfer after Gene Sarazen to complete the modern career grand slam, and the first to win the Triple Crown. As well as the "Triple Crown", the press dubbed it the "Hogan Slam" and compared it to Bobby Jones's 1930 season. For this win, Hogan received £500 (equivalent to $12,128 in 2025).

When asked afterwards if he would return to the Open Championship, Hogan said: "I don't know when I'll be back. But I'll try to make it next year." He never played again in the Open, and the win at Carnoustie was his ninth and final major championship. Hogan returned to America on July 21, aboard the SS United States. When he arrived in New York City, he received a ticker-tape parade down Broadway. He stated: "Only in America could such a thing as this happen to a little guy like me. Ever since I can remember, new things and better things have been happening to me. I owe it all to the people who have been pulling for me—and to the good Lord." Hogan was the first golfer to have been honored in this way since Bobby Jones in 1930. For his achievements, Hogan was named the 1953 AP Athlete of the Year and was awarded the Hickok Belt as the top professional athlete in the United States.

=== 1954–1971: Later years ===
As the defending champion at the 1954 Masters Tournament, Hogan held a three-stroke lead after 54 holes, but shot a 75 in the final round to fall into a tie for the lead with Sam Snead. In the ensuing 18-hole playoff, Hogan lost with a score of 71 to Snead's 70. This was one of Hogan's many close calls in major championships in his later years. He missed multiple short putts in the final round of the 1955 Masters Tournament, where he again finished runner-up, this time to Cary Middlecoff. With his persistent struggles on the green, he found it difficult to contend over the course of four rounds at Augusta National for the rest of his career. Hogan missed the cut for the first time at the 1957 Masters Tournament. This ended his streak of 14 consecutive top-10 finishes at Augusta National.

Despite his putting struggles, Hogan continued to contend in U.S. Opens. At the 1955 U.S. Open, Hogan had the outright lead through three rounds. After two putting for par on the final hole to post 287, he was congratulated by Gene Sarazen, who was commentating the event for NBC-TV. NBC then finished its coverage by declaring Hogan the champion. Meanwhile, Jack Fleck was still on the course, and birdied his final hole to match Hogan's score of 287 and force a playoff. In the playoff, Hogan trailed by one headed to the 18th hole. He hooked his drive left and took multiple strokes to remove the ball from deep rough, which resulted in a double-bogey. Fleck made par to win with 69 to Hogan's 72. Hogan announced afterwards: "I'm through with competitive golf. From now on, I'm a weekend golfer." He contended again at the 1956 U.S. Open. He missed a putt on the 71st hole from approximately 3 feet (0.91 m) and ultimately finished one stroke behind the winning mark of 282. Hogan competed in the 1956 Canada Cup the following week, where he partnered with Snead to represent the United States. They won by 14 strokes over the South African team of Bobby Locke and Gary Player. Hogan also led the individual leaderboard with a score of 7-under 277, five strokes clear of second.

Hogan won the final professional tournament of his career at the Colonial National Invitation in May 1959. After missing a 3-foot (0.91 m) putt to win in regulation, he entered an 18-hole playoff with Fred Hawkins. Regarding the miss, he said: "I was completely confident I could sink that putt. I guess I didn't hit enough club." In windy conditions, Hogan shot 1-under 69 in the playoff to best Hawkins' 73 and claim the fifth victory of his career at Colonial. He stated afterwards: "It's been quite a dry spell. I've had five years of poor putting." The following month, Hogan was in solo-second place after three rounds at the 1959 U.S. Open but shot a 76 to finish five strokes behind the winner Billy Casper.

After three rounds at the 1960 Masters Tournament, Hogan was one stroke behind the lead held by Arnold Palmer, but carded a final-round 76 to finish seven behind Palmer. Two months later, Hogan was in contention at the 1960 U.S. Open. After opening with a 4-over 75, Hogan rebounded with a 67. Paired with 20-year-old Jack Nicklaus in the third round, Hogan shot a 69, as did Nicklaus. In the final round, Hogan was tied for the lead on the par-5 17th and had around 50 yards (46 m) for his approach. He went directly at the pin for his third shot, but hit it too short and his ball found the stream guarding the green. Hogan was able to play his fourth shot onto the green, but missed the par putt and dropped out of the lead. In an attempt to reclaim the lost stroke, Hogan hit an aggressive drive on the long, par-4 18th hole, but hooked it into the water and made a 7. With his bogey, triple-bogey finish, he fell into a tie for ninth, four strokes behind the champion Palmer. In 1983, Hogan commented on his approach to the 17th green: "I find myself waking up at night thinking of that shot. ... That was 23 years ago and there isn't a month that goes by that that doesn't cut my guts out."

At the 1967 Masters Tournament, 54-year-old Hogan opened with 74-73 to make the cut but was seven strokes adrift of the lead. On Saturday, he shot the low round of the tournament with a 6-under 66, including a 30 on the back nine, to move within two of the lead. He faltered with a final-round 77 and finished tied-10th. Hogan limped badly during the tournament and it proved to be his final appearance at the Masters, although he did not announce it beforehand. He detested being seen as a ceremonial golfer and after 1967 did not attend the Masters champions' dinner. Hogan was selected as non-playing captain for the United States team in the 1967 Ryder Cup, held in Houston, Texas. The United States defeated Great Britain by a score of 23.5 to 8.5, the largest margin of victory in Ryder Cup history.

In 1971, Hogan entered the Houston Champions International held at Champions Golf Club. He played at the request of his friends Jack Burke Jr. and Jimmy Demaret, who had founded the Champions Golf Club. In the opening round, Hogan hit his approach into a creek left of the green on the par-3 4th hole. When he went down to retrieve the ball, he injured his knee which had been damaged in the 1949 car crash. He continued to play through the pain until the 12th hole, at which point he returned to the clubhouse and withdrew from the event. Aged 58, this was Hogan's last professional tournament. As he left the course, he told a friend in the gallery: "Don't ever get old."

== Personal life and death ==
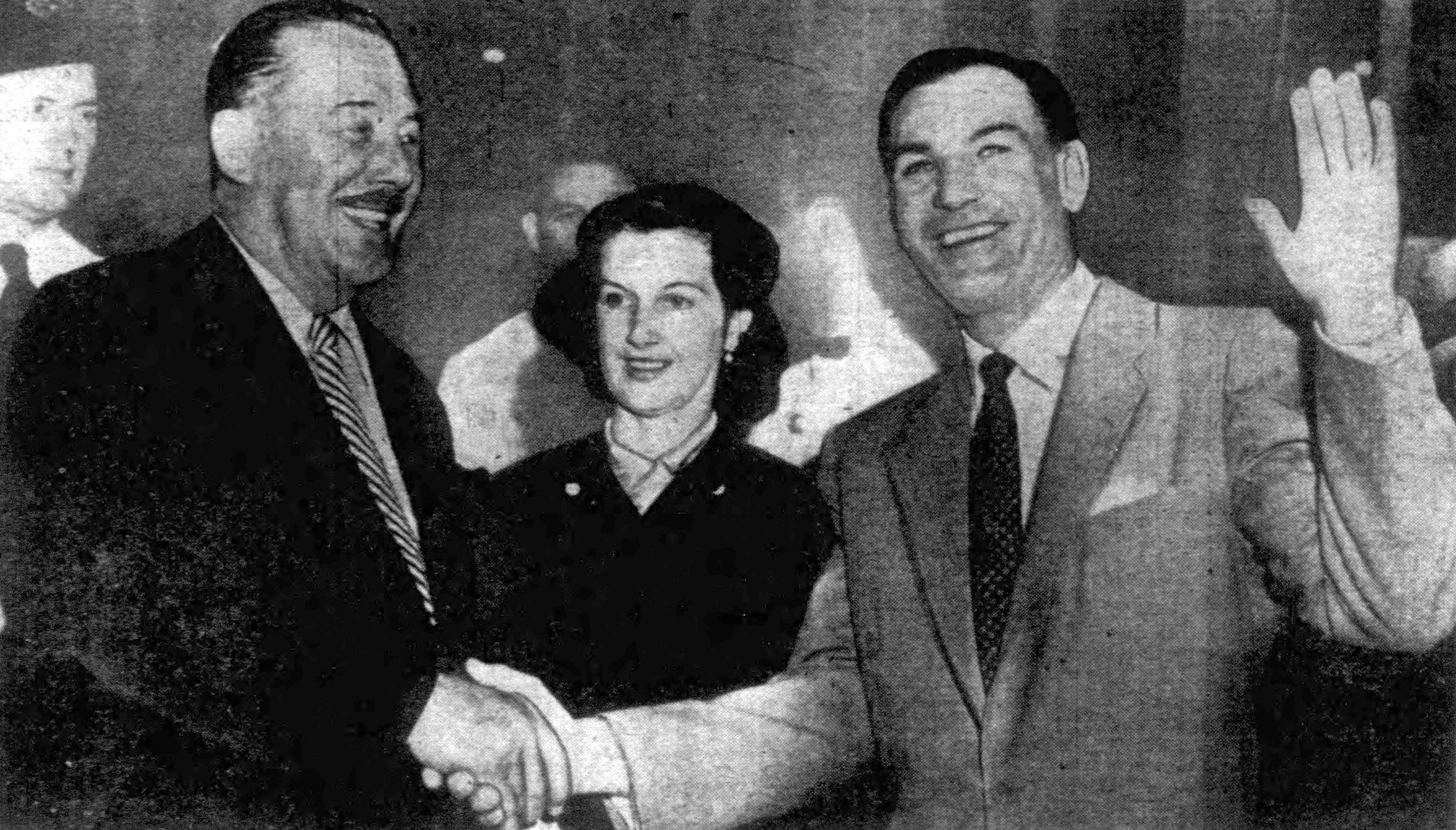
Hogan alongside his wife Valerie and politician Grover Whalen, 1953

Hogan met his wife Valerie Fox in Sunday school in Fort Worth when they were both aged around 12. They married on April 14, 1935, with a handful of friends and family in attendance at the home of Valerie's parents. The wedding was officiated by Albert Venting, pastor of the First Baptist Church in Cleburne. The couple never had children. Hogan regularly attended services by Reverend Granville Walker at University Christian Church in Fort Worth. He also attended services at the Catholic church where his niece and her husband were parishioners.

Outside of golf, Hogan became wealthy through oil exploration. He was advised by Fort Worth oilman Gary Laughlin. An oil broker who negotiated with Hogan recalled: "He studied drilling histories and geology reports and had everything down to the smallest detail. You really had to be on your toes with Ben." Hogan was a political conservative. He said in 1970: "The trouble in this country started when I was young, when the vote was extended to people who had no property."

Throughout his career, Hogan was considered introverted and shy by the media and his competitors. Sam Snead stated: "About all Ben ever said on a golf course was 'good luck' on the tee and 'you're away'." Hogan was compared to Greta Garbo due to his shunning of publicity. In his private life, Hogan was more open and affectionate. He played practical jokes on his friends and used an alterego, "Henny Bogan". He also mentored younger golfers who had asked him for help, such as Gardner Dickinson and John Schlee. Prior to his golf career, Dickinson had earned a degree in clinical psychology. He administered a psychometric evaluation of Hogan and said the results showed Hogan had "an IQ of 170 to 172".

Hogan was close friends with Marvin Leonard, a department store owner whom he had met while caddying at Glen Garden as a child. Leonard founded Colonial Country Club in 1936. He also built Shady Oaks Country Club in 1958, of which Hogan was a founding member. Leonard loaned Hogan money early in his golf career and later declined Hogan's attempt to pay the money back. Hogan gave a book to Leonard with the inscription: "To Marvin Leonard, the best friend I will ever have. If my father had lived, I would have wanted him to be just like you."

After retiring from professional golf, Hogan spent much of his time at Shady Oaks, where he continued to practice. In the clubhouse, he generally sat alone at a table overlooking the 9th and 18th greens. Hogan was fond of animals, particularly dogs, and donated to the American Society for the Prevention of Cruelty to Animals. He and Valerie had a poodle named Duffer; following its death, Hogan swore not to have another dog as he did not want to experience the pain of grief again. At Shady Oaks, he befriended two dogs, Buster and Max, which the club had adopted. Members at Shady Oaks recalled that Hogan cried at Buster's grave after the dog died in 1993.

=== Health issues ===
Hogan began smoking cigarettes around the same time he began caddying, and continued the habit into his 80s. He averaged around two packs per day. Hogan appeared in an advertisement for Chesterfield in 1953. After surgery for a ruptured appendix in 1987 led to him developing pneumonia, Hogan's doctors strongly advised him to stop smoking, but he continued to do so.

In his final years, Hogan suffered from blindness and Alzheimer's disease. During an event at Colonial Country Club in 1992 with Ben Crenshaw, Hogan toured the Hogan Room where his trophies and medals were displayed. He did not recognize them and asked Crenshaw: "Are all of these mine?" When Crenshaw confirmed they were, Hogan said: "I really must have been something." As Hogan's mental condition worsened, Valerie forbade visitors from seeing him. In 1995, Hogan had surgery due to colon cancer. He developed bronchitis after the surgery.

Hogan died on July 25, 1997, after suffering a stroke at his home in Fort Worth. He was 84. Pallbearers at the funeral included golfers Tommy Bolt, Sam Snead, and Ken Venturi, as well as sportswriters Dan Jenkins and Jim Murray. Hogan's wife Valerie died two years later on June 30, 1999; they were interred at Greenwood Memorial Park in Fort Worth.

== Technique and playing style ==
=== Practice ===
Hogan was known to practice more than any of his contemporary golfers and is credited as having "invented practice". Around the time Hogan began his career, players generally did not have structured practice sessions. Biographer Curt Sampson stated: "The old-timers in golf rarely practiced. They'd take a few swings and then go out and play in a tournament." Hogan believed that there is "not enough daylight in a day to practice all the shots you ought to be practicing." In an interview following his win at the 1953 Masters, Hogan said: "Practice means as much as playing itself. A tournament is an anticlimax to preparation, the way I see it."

When asked in 1983 why he practiced more than his contemporaries, Hogan recalled: "My swing wasn't the best in the world, and I knew it wasn't. And I thought, 'Well, the only way I can win is just to outwork these fellas'." He added: "You hear stories about me beating my brains out practicing, but... I was enjoying myself. I couldn't wait to get up in the morning, so I could hit balls. When I'm hitting the ball where I want, hard and crisply, it's a joy that very few people experience." Hogan often stated that the secret to improving at golf was "in the dirt", meaning the dirt of the practice range.

=== Ballstriking ===
At 5 ft 8.5 in (1.74 m) and 145 pounds (66 kg), Hogan was slight of build. This earned him the nickname "Bantam Ben", which he disliked. In his autobiography, Byron Nelson wrote of Hogan: "Though he was short, he had big hands and arms for his size." Hogan never wore gloves; fellow Masters champion Jimmy Demaret said shaking hands with Hogan felt like "putting your hand in a meat grinder" due to his extensive calluses. After meeting Hogan for the first time in 1951, baseball player Ted Williams stated: "I just shook a hand that felt like five bands of steel."

Despite his modest stature, Hogan was among the longer hitters on tour in his era. He had exceptional athleticism and a fast swing, which enabled him to keep pace with his physically larger rivals such as Nelson and Sam Snead. Hogan believed that driving was the most important part of the golf game. Golf instructor Jim McLean stated that, during a visit to the equipment company Spalding, Hogan had recorded the fastest clubhead speed among all professionals at that time. Hogan had a significant lateral slide of his hips at the start of his downswing, which allowed him to create a lot of lag. Professional golfer Bob Toski said Hogan had the "fastest and most complete clearance of his hips toward the target, and he kept right-arm extension past impact longer than anyone." Hogan was double-jointed, which helped him to execute his swing. Gary Player said: "I tried to copy Hogan for a long time, but I finally had to give up. It was wrecking my game. The man was a gymnast."

Early in his career, Hogan primarily used a right-to-left ball flight. This at times manifested as a snap hook, particularly under pressure. Demaret said Hogan's change in 1942 from a slight hook to a soft fade led him to becoming a great golfer. Hogan's efforts to fix the hook were perfected in 1946 and he stated he had discovered the "secret" that year. The result was the "Hogan fade", a relatively low-trajectory shot which curved only a few yards left-to-right. The shot involved a weakening of his left-hand grip and rotating the clubface open on the backswing, thus creating a cupped wrist. These measures allowed him to release the club as hard as he wanted without fear of the clubface shutting and producing a hook. Gardner Dickinson said of Hogan's changes: "In this final, brilliant product, Hogan had taken his biggest enemy, the huge forward slide, and turned it into his biggest asset." Butch Harmon said in 2009: "Until Tiger came along, I'd never seen a good player with body speed as fast as Mr. Hogan's. That's why he ruined so many emulators. As open as he got the club on the downswing, he needed tremendous speed to get it back to square."

Hogan had a negative angle of attack, meaning he hit down on the ball slightly with the driver. To prevent the balata balls used at the time ballooning up as a result of the negative attack angle, Hogan covered the ball through impact. His ability to compress the ball meant he was one of the few players of his era who did not lose distance by hitting a fade. According to instructors polled by Golf Digest, Hogan created his fade through his club path, which was left of the target. He combined this with a square club face at impact, as a leftward path and an open face would have caused a slice rather than a tight fade. Sean Foley, formerly a coach of Tiger Woods, dissented to this opinion and stated that Hogan had a neutral path and clubface. Foley believed instead that Hogan intentionally hit towards the heel of the club, thus utilizing the gear effect to produce a fade. As radar monitors such as TrackMan did not exist during Hogan's time, the specifics of how he created his power fade are unknown in quantifiable terms and can only be surmised. Alongside the fade, Hogan continued to hit draws if required by the pin location.

Due to the injuries he suffered in the 1949 accident, Hogan was forced to change his swing. The damage to his knees and pelvis caused him to reduce his hip turn through the ball, which lowered his driving distance by around 12 yards. He compensated for this by narrowing his stance, thus attaining more control and repeatability. Mike Bell, a member of the Ben Hogan Foundation, said: "When you look at photographs of Hogan's golf swing in '46, '47 and '48, he'd clearly figured it out. The golf swing after the wreck is different. It was much more compact, much shorter. Still extremely precise. It was like he reinvented his golf swing to fit what his body could do." Brendan Quinn of The Athletic remarked in 2020 that "you could make the case that Ben Hogan built the greatest golf swing the game has ever seen. Twice."

=== Course management ===
Hogan stressed the importance of course management. At the 1938 St. Petersburg Open, Hogan hit two flagsticks in the same round, causing his ball to ricochet far away from the hole. He realized that aiming directly at the pin was hurting his game and decided afterwards to aim for flat portions of the green near the hole, preferably leaving himself uphill putts for birdie. In preparation for tournaments, Hogan walked the course backwards (from green to fairway, from fairway to tee) in order to determine the optimal way to play the course. Hogan removed his 7-iron from the bag in favor of a 1-iron at the 1950 U.S. Open at Merion Golf Club, proclaiming: "There are no seven-iron shots at Merion."

After winning the 1953 Masters, Hogan said: "You can hit your shots great and still shoot 80 every day because of poor management. The shots are 30 percent of the game. Judgment is 70 percent." Sportswriter Arthur Daley stated that during practice rounds at the 1953 U.S. Open, Hogan hit three balls on each tee then played in from there to assess the hole from different angles. Hogan remarked that "the most important shot in golf is the next one." During the 1953 Open Championship, he was dubbed the "Wee Ice Mon" (or "Wee Iceman") by the Scottish fans in reference to his emotionless demeanor on the course, as though he had ice in his veins.

Hogan was nicknamed the "Hawk" due to how he analyzed his opponents, and because of the way he studied courses. He stated in 1975 that the "greatest thing in golf is to be able to save shots". He said the key to accomplishing this was distance control, adding: "It's just as bad to hit a ball too far or too short as it is to hook or slice." Hogan's former caddie Chuck Pollock recalled in 1991 that Hogan rarely talked to him on the course: "He was very prepared and didn't need much from me except to check for pin placements. ... He was like a computer out there. Every shot had been planned before the round, and he knew exactly when to go after birdies."

=== Putting ===
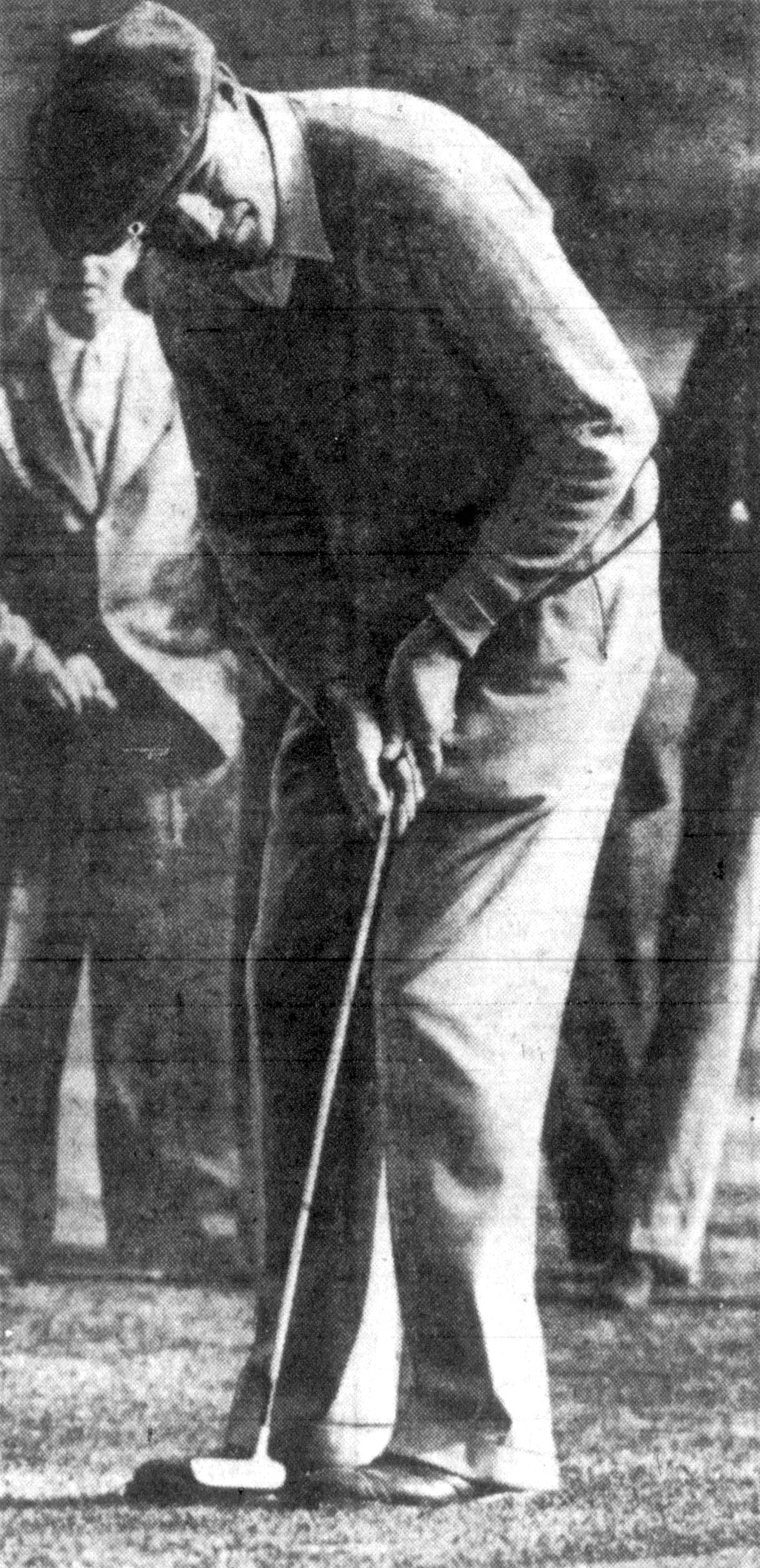
Hogan holding a putter in 1950

Hogan struggled with putting for much of his career. After complaining to his wife in 1937 about not making enough putts, she suggested: "Just hit the ball a little closer to the hole." Following the accident in 1949, Hogan asked Jack Burke Jr., who was considered among the top putters on tour, for help with his putting. Burke recalled in 2009: "I think he knew he wasn't going to be as good tee to green, not as long and not as good with the irons. Before that, Hogan didn't really know a lot about putting, never was really serious about it. But we worked on it, mainly got his left hand under the shaft, which helps close the toe on the forward stroke, and he got better. He putted pretty well for three years." As his putting struggles worsened, Hogan tested various types of putters and putting grips. In preparation for the 1957 Masters Tournament, Hogan tried a 10-finger, baseball grip while putting. Although his putting improved, he was too embarrassed to use the grip in front of the crowds at Augusta National and reverted to the conventional, reverse-overlap grip which he had used throughout his career. He subsequently missed the cut at the Masters for the first time in his career.

Following the 1957 Masters, Hogan proposed eliminating putting from golf: "I've always contended that golf is one game, and putting is another. If I had my way, every golf green would be made into a huge funnel; you hit the funnel, and the ball would roll down a pipe into the hole." Hogan's contemporary Fred Haas said Hogan had told him: "I don't want to be remembered as a great putter. I want to be remembered as a great striker of the ball." In his later career, Hogan was afflicted by the yips. He stated in 1974: "I got to where I couldn't get the putter back. I could get it through if I could ever get it back, but I couldn't get it back. I would just stand there and shake, and it wouldn't move." In response to a question about how he mastered ballstriking but not putting, Hogan said the ball is "subject to too many undulations and grass changes and things like that" while on the ground compared to when it is in air.

=== Hand dominance ===
In his 1948 book Power Golf, Hogan wrote: "Many golf fans are surprised to learn that I learned to play golf left-handed when I first took up the game. I changed over when I was a small boy. The only clubs I could get were right-handed. Moreover, most of the fellows I played with then were very convincing in telling me that left-handers never made good golfers. At that age I was gullible enough to believe them and to make the change." When asked if he was left-handed in a 1987 interview, he said: "No, that's one of those things that's always been written, but it's an absolute myth." Biographer Curt Sampson said Hogan intentionally obfuscated details about himself, and said Hogan's "explanations were often meant to mystify."

== "Five Lessons" and golf instruction ==
In 1954, Hogan accepted an offer of $10,000 (equivalent to $119,888 in 2025) from Life magazine to reveal the "secret" to his swing which he stated he had discovered in 1946. Hogan had previously explained some golf swing theories in his 1948 instructional Power Golf. The story in Life, tilted "Ben Hogan Finally Reveals the Mysterious Maneuver That Made Him a Champion", was issued on August 8, 1955. In it, he said the secret had three components: weakening his grip (in other words, moving it to his left), opening the clubface on the backswing, and cupping the left wrist. This method was designed to prevent him from hooking the ball, which made the "secret" ineffectual for most recreational golfers who generally struggled with slices rather than hooks. In the Life piece, Hogan stated: "I doubt if it will be worth a doggone to the weekend duffer and it will ruin a bad golfer. With the club so wide open at the top of the backswing, anybody who fails to close it properly on the way down will push the ball off to the right—or worse yet, shank it off to the right at a horrible right angle. But it will be a blessing to the good golfer."

Hogan's fellow professionals believed he had not revealed much to Life and retained the real secret for himself. As debate about the secret continued, Sports Illustrated published drawings on the subject, which it took from Hogan's piece in Life without his permission. After Hogan threatened to sue, Life and Sports Illustrated founder Henry Luce offered him an additional $20,000 (equivalent to $240,373 in 2025) to write a full-length instructional, which Hogan accepted. Sports Illustrated writer Herbert Warren Wind and medical illustrator Anthony Ravielli were chosen as co-author and illustrator of the instructional, titled Five Lessons: The Modern Fundamentals of Golf.

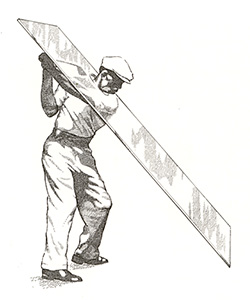
Hogan's imagined glass swing plane

Originally serialized in Sports Illustrated beginning in March 1957, Five Lessons was printed in book form later that year and quickly became the best-selling golf instructional in history. According to John Garrity, a former editor at Simon & Schuster, golf instructionals generally sold around 12,000 copies. He stated: "There's only been a couple exceptions to that." As of 2024, Five Lessons had been licensed to numerous publishers throughout the years and cumulatively sold over 1 million copies.

Five Lessons was written in an authoritative style and used all capitals at times for emphasis. It opened with a foreword, preface, and an introductory chapter titled "The Fundamentals". Each lesson in the book is a chapter: The Grip; Stance and Posture; The First Part of the Swing; The Second Part of the Swing; Summary and Review. Sports psychologist Gio Valiante said in 2021: "The tone of the 'Five Lessons' is consistent with [Hogan's] personality. Hogan was an efficient golfer; he had an efficient golf swing, and he was efficient with words." Hogan's goal for the instructional was to enable bogey golfers to break 80 regularly. He later said the "most important thing in the golf swing" is the sequence of the body's movement, in particular that the lower body should initiate the downswing. He stated: "Most people do it entirely opposite. They rotate their shoulders first instead of their lower body. As a result, they come across and hit the outside of the ball instead of the back of it."

Hogan's Five Lessons influenced golfers such as Lee Trevino and Nick Faldo. Instructor Jim Flick said in 2001 that much of the modern interpretation of the golf swing derives from the adjustments Hogan made to his own swing and his writings in Five Lessons. Flick stated that swing coaches had elaborated Hogan's instruction into "a mechanical, big-muscle philosophy" which "neglected the soul that was at the heart of Ben Hogan's game," opining that Hogan was not a mechanical player but a "feel player with a brilliant understanding of swing mechanics." Jaime Diaz, a writer who edited an anniversary edition of Five Lessons, stated in 2024: "It's an anti-hook book. I mean, really weak grip and just making sure the club never turns over. It's a Tour player's swing. But even Tour players can't always replicate it."

== Ben Hogan Golf Company ==
Hogan became affiliated with the equipment company MacGregor Golf in 1937, after signing a contract worth $250 (equivalent to $5,599 in 2025). When asked by MacGregor representative Toney Penna if he would use the MacGregor Tourney ball in 1953, Hogan said: "Hell no! It's the worst golf ball ever made." He refused to use the ball during his 1953 season and his relationship with the company dissolved. Hogan had decided prior to this that he would start his own golf equipment company. In October 1953, he announced the creation of the Ben Hogan Company and sent a letter to club professionals asking them to support his venture. Hogan's perfectionism towards golf carried over to manufacturing, and in 1954 he scrapped the first batch of clubs that were produced due to them not meeting his standards. The batch was worth around $100,000 (equivalent to $1.2 million in 2025), and Hogan's decision to scrap it led to the exit of an investor.

Marketed as clubs for "the better player", the company utilized Hogan's image strongly in its advertising. Due to a small budget, Hogan was unable to pay the top players at the time to use his clubs as they already had contracts with established brands such as MacGregor, Spalding, and Wilson. Hogan sought to design top-end products and made innovations, such as fitting long irons with stiffer shafts than short irons. This idea was later adopted by other equipment manufacturers. The company struggled to gain prominence against established rivals in the industry, and Hogan decided to sell the company as raising operating capital became troublesome. It was acquired by American Machine and Foundry (AMF) in 1960, at a price of around $3.7 million (equivalent to $40 million in 2025). Hogan received cash as well as equity in AMF.

After the sale to AMF, Hogan was appointed director of the Ben Hogan Golf Company and continued designing and manufacturing clubs. He also had input in the company's sales and marketing policies. As the company used his name, Hogan viewed it as a representation of himself. Hogan designed the Apex model of irons in 1972. It had a forged-blade style, which he favored over the cavity-back, investment-cast models that were beginning to gain popularity. Hogan believed such clubs reduced the player's feel and ability to discern if a shot had been struck properly. The Apex line was successful, and it became a platform for Hogan's experimentation with weight distribution and sole design ideas. He also designed the Apex shaft, which James Achenbach of Golfweek said in 2013 is "sometimes called golf's first lightweight shaft."

The company had sales of around $4 million in the late 1960s, but flourished in the 1970s and became the highest-selling club manufacturer in golf course shops. By 1980, sales had increased tenfold to over $40 million (equivalent to $156 million in 2025). In late 1979, AMF appointed a new president, who reduced Hogan's role in the company and removed him from its commercials. The company also shifted focus from selling in shops at golf courses to off-course stores; the strategy was unsuccessful and the business began to struggle financially. In 1984, AMF sold the Ben Hogan Golf Company to vulture investor Irwin L. Jacobs for $15 million (equivalent to $46 million in 2025). This was part of Jacobs' hostile takeover of AMF, which was completed in 1985. The company reported losses of $2.5 million in the year following the takeover. A new president was hired, who convinced Hogan that the company should release a line of easy-to-hit, cavity-backed irons for high handicap golfers, similar to ones marketed at the time by Ping. Hogan advertised the new clubs in television commercials and the company returned to profitability.

In 1988, the company was acquired for $55 million (equivalent to $150 million in 2025) by Cosmo World, a group of Japanese investors who later bought Pebble Beach Golf Links. After the acquisition, Hogan said: "Mr. Isutani, you've bought the family jewels. Don't fuck it up." The company began primarily focusing on the Japanese market and Hogan's influence on the company decreased. In 1992, Cosmo World was in financial distress and sold the company to Bill Goodwin, for $61 million (equivalent to $140 million in 2025). Goodwin had no background in golf and moved the manufacturing from its long-term base in Fort Worth to a plant in Richmond, Virginia. Hogan's secretary Sharon Rea recalled: "It very much saddened him when the company moved out of Fort Worth. He didn't have any children and this was his baby."

Revenue declined from over $60 million to around $10 million during Goodwin's ownership. Following Hogan's death in 1997, the manufacturing returned to Fort Worth after the brand was bought by Spalding, for $14.6 million (equivalent to $29 million in 2025). In 2003, Spalding (then renamed Top-Flite) filed for bankruptcy. Callaway bought the Top-Flite, Strata, and Ben Hogan brands out of bankruptcy for $169 million (equivalent to $296 million in 2025). Callaway discontinued the Hogan brand in 2008, and sold the branding rights to Perry Ellis International in 2012.

== Legacy ==
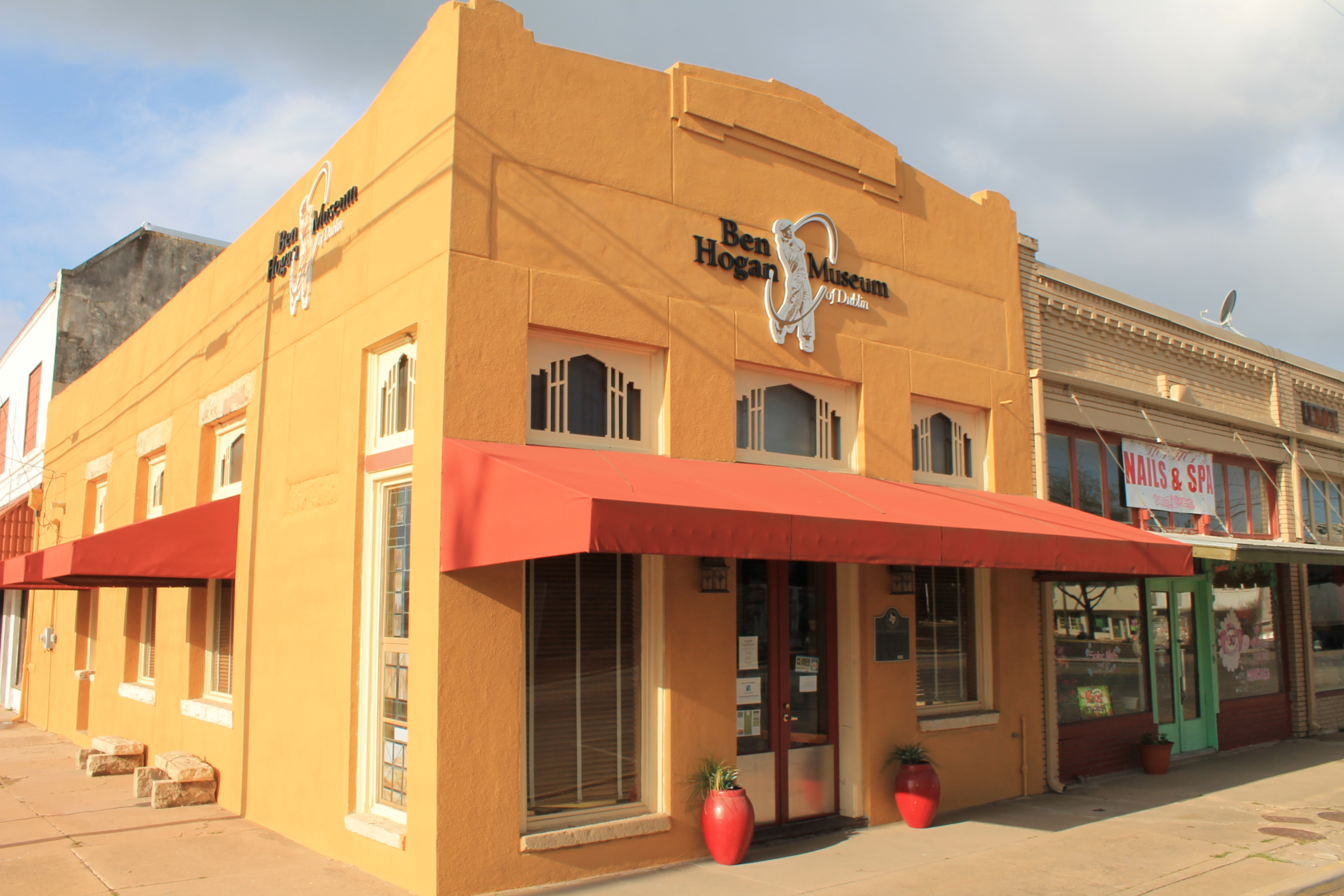
The Ben Hogan Museum in his hometown of Dublin, Texas

Hogan was selected as one of the thirteen inaugural inductees to the World Golf Hall of Fame in 1974. He received the 1976 Bob Jones Award, which is the United States Golf Association's highest honor. A room at the USGA Museum was dedicated to him, named the Ben Hogan Room. In 2012, a standalone Ben Hogan Museum was opened in his hometown Dublin, Texas.

A biographical film about Hogan, titled Follow the Sun, was released in 1951, in which he was portrayed by Glenn Ford. It focuses on his early career, his relationship with his wife, the car accident, and his return to golf at the Los Angeles Open. Hogan served as technical advisor during the production. He insisted to director Sidney Lanfield that clubs used in the film should be realistic, and often interrupted filming to show Ford how to grip the club and how to address the ball. Hogan biographer Curt Sampson said: "Ford, an unathletic man whose hobby was gardening, held the club as if it were a trowel and swung it like a rake." Hogan's contemporaries Byron Nelson and Sam Snead also had negative opinions of the film, but reviews from non-golfers were more favorable. A documentary on Hogan by golf historian Fred Simmons was released in 1994, titled A Hard Case from Texas. In 2019, Golf Channel produced Hogan, a two-part biopic on Hogan's life and legacy.

=== Namesake ===
Due to his success at the course, Riviera Country Club in Los Angeles was nicknamed "Hogan's Alley". In an 18-month stretch, he won three times at Riviera, twice when it hosted the Los Angeles Open and another when it was the venue for the 1948 U.S. Open. Jimmy Demaret, who finished runner-up at the 1948 U.S. Open, said Hogan seemed unbeatable at Riviera. Another course that became known as "Hogan's Alley" was Colonial Country Club in Fort Worth. Hogan won five times at the course when it hosted the Colonial National Invitation, including the inaugural edition in 1946. His last victory in a professional tournament came at Colonial in 1959. In 1995, a seven-foot bronze statue of Hogan was installed at Colonial Country Club. During the 1953 Open Championship at Carnoustie Golf Links, Hogan played the par-5 6th hole aggressively. Most of the field that year chose to lay up off the tee short of the bunkers on the right half. Hogan noticed he could reach the green in two if he aimed down the left, which brought out of bounds into play. He successfully targeted the left side en route to victory and the hole later became known as "Hogan's Alley". Previously named "Long", the hole was officially renamed Hogan's Alley in 2003.

In recognition of Hogan's win at the 1953 Masters Tournament, where he broke the scoring record, Augusta National Golf Club renamed the bridge which carries players across Rae's Creek to the 12th green as the Hogan Bridge in 1958. Beginning in 1990, the Ben Hogan Award has been awarded annually to the top collegiate golfer in the United States. Also in 1990, Hogan gave his name to the Ben Hogan Tour, a development tour which aimed to provide a pathway for players to reach the PGA Tour. When the tour was launched, he advised the players: "Watch out for buses." The tour had multiple name changes through the years; as of 2020, it is called the Korn Ferry Tour for sponsorship reasons.

=== Assessment ===
Hogan is regarded as one of the greatest golfers in the history of the game. Golf Digest stated that, in 1970, Hogan was "unquestionably thought to be the greatest golfer in history." In ESPN's SportsCentury list of the 50 greatest North American athletes of the 20th century, Hogan ranked at 38th. In 2000, Golf Digest ranked Hogan as the second greatest player of all time, behind Jack Nicklaus. In The Golf 100, a 2025 ranking of the top 100 golfers in history, Nicklaus was first, Tiger Woods was second, Bobby Jones was third, Hogan was fourth, and Arnold Palmer was fifth.

In particular, Hogan is considered among the finest ballstrikers in history. Golf instructor David Leadbetter said in 2014 that there is "no higher compliment" than to say that a golfer is "hitting it like Hogan." In 1967, the editor of Cary Middlecoff's 1974 book The Golf Swing watched every shot that 54-year-old Hogan hit at the Colonial National Invitational in Fort Worth, stating:

The idea was to watch Hogan play every shot for the full 72 holes and determine, as far as possible, whether he was in fact the best shotmaker in golf from tee to green. Hogan shot 281 for a third-place tie with George Archer. Of the 281 shots, 141 were taken in reaching the greens. Of the 141, 139 were rated from well-executed to superbly executed. The remaining two were a drive that missed the fairway by some 5 yards and a 5-iron to a par-3 hole that missed the green by about the same distance. It was difficult, if not impossible to conceive of anybody hitting the ball better over a four-day span.

When asked in 2004 if Tiger Woods was the best ballstriker he had seen, Jack Nicklaus replied: "No, no - Ben Hogan, easily". Amidst an attempt to change his swing in 2004, Woods said: "Only two players have ever truly owned their swings: Moe Norman and Ben Hogan. I want to own mine." Woods' coach at the time, Hank Haney, stated the goal was to mould Woods' swing into one more similar to Hogan, Norman, and Lee Trevino.

Charles McGrath of The New York Times said in 1998 that Hogan, with "his perfectionism and his elegant, un-logoed wardrobe," had done more than anyone else to bring the PGA Tour "from its rowdy, barnstorming days into the modern era of professionalism." Major champion Johnny Miller of Golf.com proclaimed in 2013: "Ben is more respected for the quality of his shots than any golfer ever in history and that includes Woods or Nicklaus—nobody has been copied more than Ben Hogan and his book has been copied more than any book ever."

== Professional wins (69) ==
=== PGA Tour wins (64) ===
Legend
Major championships (9)
Other PGA Tour (55)

| No. | Date | Tournament | Winning score | Margin of victory | Runner(s)-up |
|---|---|---|---|---|---|
| 1 | Sep 4, 1938 | Hershey Four-Ball (with (United States) Vic Ghezzi) | +17 points | 15 points | (United States) Paul Runyan and (United States) Sam Snead |
| 2 | Mar 21, 1940 | North and South Open | −11 (66-67-74-70=277) | 3 strokes | (United States) Sam Snead |
| 3 | Mar 25, 1940 | Greater Greensboro Open | −12 (68-69-66-67=270) | 9 strokes | (United States) Craig Wood |
| 4 | Mar 31, 1940 | Asheville Land of the Sky Open | −11 (67-68-69-69=273) | 3 strokes | (United States) Ralph Guldahl |
| 5 | May 19, 1940 | Goodall Round Robin | +23 points | 4 points | (United States) Sam Snead |
| 6 | Mar 5, 1941 | Miami Biltmore International Four-Ball (with (United States) Gene Sarazen) | 4 and 3 | | (United States) Ralph Guldahl and (United States) Sam Snead |
| 7 | Mar 30, 1941 | Asheville Open (2) | E (67-73-75-69=284) | 2 strokes | (United States) Lawson Little |
| 8 | Jun 22, 1941 | Inverness Invitational Four-Ball (with (United States) Jimmy Demaret) | +11 points | 3 points | (United States) Byron Nelson and (Scotland) Jimmy Thomson |
| 9 | Jul 20, 1941 | Chicago Open | −10 (66-70-69-69=274) | 2 strokes | (United States) Craig Wood |
| 10 | Aug 31, 1941 | Hershey Open | −17 (69-67-69-70=275) | 5 strokes | (United States) Lloyd Mangrum |
| 11 | Jan 12, 1942 | Los Angeles Open | −2 (70-70-72-70=282) | Playoff | (Scotland) Jimmy Thomson |
| 12 | Jan 25, 1942 | San Francisco Open | −9 (65-71-72-71=279) | 3 strokes | (United States) Sam Snead |
| 13 | Mar 30, 1942 | North and South Open (2) | −17 (67-68-67-69=271) | 5 strokes | (United States) Sam Snead |
| 14 | Apr 5, 1942 | Asheville Land of the Sky Open (3) | −8 (71-69-68-68=276) | 1 stroke | (United States) Lawson Little |
| 15 | Jun 21, 1942 | Hale America Open | −17 (72-62-69-68=271) | 3 strokes | (United States) Jimmy Demaret, (United States) Mike Turnesa |
| 16 | Aug 16, 1942 | Rochester Times-Union Open | −2 (64-68-72-74=278) | 3 strokes | (United States) Craig Wood |
| 17 | Sep 3, 1945 | Nashville Invitational | −19 (64-67-68-66=265) | 4 strokes | (United States) Johnny Bulla, (United States) Byron Nelson |
| 18 | Sep 30, 1945 | Portland Open Invitational | −27 (65-69-63-64=261) | 14 strokes | (United States) Byron Nelson |
| 19 | Nov 4, 1945 | Richmond Invitational | +5 (72-70-74-73=289) | 4 strokes | (United States) Dick Metz |
| 20 | Nov 25, 1945 | Montgomery Invitational | −6 (73-69-72-68=282) | Playoff | (United States) Jug McSpaden |
| 21 | Dec 2, 1945 | Orlando Open | −14 (69-69-65-67=270) | 6 strokes | (United States) Jug McSpaden, (United States) Johnny Revolta |
| 22 | Jan 27, 1946 | Phoenix Open | −11 (66-68-68-71=273) | Playoff | (United States) Herman Keiser |
| 23 | Feb 10, 1946 | San Antonio Texas Open | −20 (67-65-67-65=264) | 6 strokes | (United States) Sammy Byrd |
| 24 | Mar 3, 1946 | St. Petersburg Open | −15 (64-67-70-68=269) | 5 strokes | (United States) Sam Snead |
| 25 | Mar 10, 1946 | Miami International Four-Ball (2) (with (United States) Jimmy Demaret) | 1 up | | (United States) Sammy Byrd and (United States) Sam Snead |
| 26 | May 19, 1946 | Colonial National Invitation | −1 (73-72-69-65=279) | 1 stroke | (United States) Harry Todd |
| 27 | May 26, 1946 | Western Open | −17 (68-66-67-70=271) | 4 strokes | (United States) Lloyd Mangrum |
| 28 | Jun 2, 1946 | Goodall Round Robin (2) | +51 points | 25 points | (United States) Lloyd Mangrum |
| 29 | Jun 23, 1946 | Inverness Invitational Four-Ball (2) (with (United States) Jimmy Demaret) | +20 points | 6 points | (United States) Jug McSpaden and (United States) Byron Nelson |
| 30 | Aug 10, 1946 | Winnipeg Open | −7 (73-71-69-68=281) | 1 stroke | (United States) Dick Metz |
| 31 | Aug 25, 1946 | PGA Championship | 6 and 4 | | (United States) Ed Oliver |
| 32 | Sep 2, 1946 | Golden State Open | −9 (66-69-70-70=275) | 1 stroke | (United States) Chick Harbert |
| 33 | Sep 29, 1946 | Dallas Invitational | +4 (70-69-72-73=284) | 2 strokes | (United States) Herman Keiser, (United States) Paul Runyan |
| 34 | Nov 7, 1946 | North and South Open (3) | −6 (71-71-70-70=282) | 2 strokes | (United States) Mike Turnesa, (United States) Sam Snead |
| 35 | Jan 6, 1947 | Los Angeles Open (2) | −4 (70-66-72-72=280) | 3 strokes | (United States) Toney Penna |
| 36 | Jan 26, 1947 | Phoenix Open (2) | −14 (67-64-70-69=270) | 7 strokes | (United States) Lloyd Mangrum, (United States) Ed Oliver |
| 37 | Mar 9, 1947 | Miami International Four-Ball (3) (with (United States) Jimmy Demaret) | 3 and 2 | | (United States) Lawson Little and (United States) Lloyd Mangrum |
| 38 | May 18, 1947 | Colonial National Invitation (2) | −1 (68-72-70-69=279) | 1 stroke | (United States) Toney Penna |
| 39 | Jun 29, 1947 | Chicago Victory Open (2) | −14 (66-68-66-70=270) | 4 strokes | (United States) Sam Snead |
| 40 | Jul 13, 1947 | Inverness Invitational Four-Ball (3) (with (United States) Jimmy Demaret) | +12 points | 2 points | (United States) Clayton Heafner and (United States) Ellsworth Vines |
| 41 | Sep 28, 1947 | World Championship of Golf | −9 (65-70=135) | 3 strokes | (United States) Bobby Locke |
| 42 | Jan 5, 1948 | Los Angeles Open (3) | −9 (68-70-70-67=275) | 4 strokes | (United States) Lloyd Mangrum |
| 43 | May 25, 1948 | PGA Championship (2) | 7 and 6 | | (United States) Mike Turnesa |
| 44 | Jun 12, 1948 | U.S. Open | −8 (67-72-68-69=276) | 2 strokes | (United States) Jimmy Demaret |
| 45 | Jun 27, 1948 | Inverness Invitational Four-Ball (4) (with (United States) Jimmy Demaret) | +16 points | 10 points | (United States) Vic Ghezzi and (United States) Chick Harbert |
| 46 | Jul 4, 1948 | Motor City Open | −9 (70-73-66-66=275) | Playoff | (United States) Dutch Harrison |
| 47 | Jul 25, 1948 | Reading Open | −19 (67-72-66-64=269) | 1 stroke | (United States) Fred Haas |
| 48 | Aug 1, 1948 | Western Open (2) | −7 (67-70-70-74=281) | Playoff | (United States) Ed Oliver |
| 49 | Aug 22, 1948 | Denver Open Invitational | −18 (66-67-70-67=270) | 1 stroke | (United States) Fred Haas |
| 50 | Sep 6, 1948 | Reno Open | −19 (67-69-65-68=269) | 2 strokes | (United States) Lloyd Mangrum, (United States) Dick Metz |
| 51 | Oct 17, 1948 | Glendale Open | −13 (69-68-74-64=275) | 2 strokes | (United States) Lloyd Mangrum |
| 52 | Jan 16, 1949 | Bing Crosby Pro-Am | −8 (70-68-70=208) | 2 strokes | (Australia) Jim Ferrier |
| 53 | Jan 24, 1949 | Long Beach Open | −12 (68-66-70-68=272) | Playoff | (United States) Jimmy Demaret |
| 54 | Jun 10, 1950 | U.S. Open (2) | +7 (72-69-72-74=287) | Playoff | (United States) George Fazio, (United States) Lloyd Mangrum |
| 55 | Apr 8, 1951 | Masters Tournament | −8 (70-72-70-68=280) | 2 strokes | (United States) Skee Riegel |
| 56 | Jun 16, 1951 | U.S. Open (3) | +7 (76-73-71-67=287) | 2 strokes | (United States) Clayton Heafner |
| 57 | Aug 12, 1951 | World Championship of Golf (2) | −15 (68-69-70-66=273) | 3 strokes | (United States) Jimmy Demaret |
| 58 | May 25, 1952 | Colonial National Invitation (3) | −1 (74-67-71-67=279) | 4 strokes | (United States) Lloyd Mangrum |
| 59 | Apr 12, 1953 | Masters Tournament (2) | −14 (70-69-66-69=274) | 5 strokes | (United States) Ed Oliver |
| 60 | May 3, 1953 | Pan American Open | −2 (72-72-68-74=286) | 3 strokes | (United States) Dave Douglas, (United States) Fred Haas |
| 61 | May 24, 1953 | Colonial National Invitation (4) | +2 (73-71-71-67=282) | 5 strokes | (United States) Doug Ford, (United States) Cary Middlecoff |
| 62 | Jun 13, 1953 | U.S. Open (4) | −5 (67-72-73-71=283) | 6 strokes | (United States) Sam Snead |
| 63 | Jul 10, 1953 | The Open Championship | −6 (73-71-70-68=282) | 4 strokes | (Argentina) Antonio Cerdá, (Wales) Dai Rees, (United States) Frank Stranahan, (Australia) Peter Thomson |
| 64 | May 3, 1959 | Colonial National Invitation (5) | +5 (69-67-77-72=285) | Playoff | (United States) Fred Hawkins |

Source: (Barkow 1989, pp. 261–262)

=== Other wins (5) ===
this list is probably incomplete

- 1940 Westchester Open, Westchester PGA Championship
- 1950 Greenbrier Pro-Am
- 1956 World Cup of Golf individual; World Cup of Golf team

== Major championships ==
=== Wins (9) ===
| Year | Championship | 54 holes | Winning score | Margin | Runner(s)-up |
|---|---|---|---|---|---|
| 1946 | PGA Championship | n/a | 6 & 4 | n/a | (United States) Ed Oliver |
| 1948 | PGA Championship (2) | n/a | 7 & 6 | n/a | (United States) Mike Turnesa |
| 1948 | U.S. Open | 2 shot lead | −8 (67-72-68-69=276) | 2 strokes | (United States) Jimmy Demaret |
| 1950 | U.S. Open (2) | 2 shot deficit | +7 (72-69-72-74=287) | Playoff^{1} | (United States) George Fazio, (United States) Lloyd Mangrum |
| 1951 | Masters Tournament | 1 shot deficit | −8 (70-72-70-68=280) | 2 strokes | (United States) Skee Riegel |
| 1951 | U.S. Open (3) | 2 shot deficit | +7 (76-73-71-67=287) | 2 strokes | (United States) Clayton Heafner |
| 1953 | Masters Tournament (2) | 4 shot lead | −14 (70-69-66-69=274) | 5 strokes | (United States) Ed Oliver |
| 1953 | U.S. Open (4) | 1 shot lead | −5 (67-72-73-71=283) | 6 strokes | (United States) Sam Snead |
| 1953 | The Open Championship | Tied for lead | −6 (73-71-70-68=282) | 4 strokes | (Argentina) Antonio Cerdá, (Wales) Dai Rees, (United States) Frank Stranahan, (Australia) Peter Thomson |

Note: The PGA Championship was match play until 1958
^{1}Defeated Mangrum and Fazio in 18-hole playoff; Hogan 69 (−1), Mangrum 73 (+3), Fazio 75 (+5).

=== Results timeline ===
| Tournament | 1934 | 1935 | 1936 | 1937 | 1938 | 1939 |
|---|---|---|---|---|---|---|
| Masters Tournament | | | | | T25 | 9 |
| U.S. Open | CUT | | CUT | | CUT | T62 |
| The Open Championship | | | | | | |
| PGA Championship | | | | | | R16 |

| Tournament | 1940 | 1941 | 1942 | 1943 | 1944 | 1945 | 1946 | 1947 | 1948 | 1949 |
|---|---|---|---|---|---|---|---|---|---|---|
| Masters Tournament | T10 | 4 | 2 | NT | NT | NT | 2 | T4 | T6 | |
| U.S. Open | T5 | T3 | NT | NT | NT | NT | T4 | T6 | 1 | |
| The Open Championship | NT | NT | NT | NT | NT | NT | | | | |
| PGA Championship | QF | QF | QF | NT | | | 1 | R64 | 1 | |

| Tournament | 1950 | 1951 | 1952 | 1953 | 1954 | 1955 | 1956 | 1957 | 1958 | 1959 |
|---|---|---|---|---|---|---|---|---|---|---|
| Masters Tournament | T4 | 1 | T7 | 1 | 2 | 2 | T8 | CUT | T14 | T30 |
| U.S. Open | 1 | 1 | 3 | 1 | T6 | 2 | T2 | | T10 | T8 |
| The Open Championship | | | | 1 | | | | | | |
| PGA Championship | | | | | | | | | | |

| Tournament | 1960 | 1961 | 1962 | 1963 | 1964 | 1965 | 1966 | 1967 |
|---|---|---|---|---|---|---|---|---|
| Masters Tournament | T6 | T32 | 38 | | T9 | T21 | T13 | T10 |
| U.S. Open | T9 | T14 | | | | | 12 | T34 |
| The Open Championship | | | | | | | | |
| PGA Championship | CUT | | | | T9 | T15 | | |

Win
Top 10
Did not play

NT = no tournament
WD = Withdrew
CUT = missed the half-way cut (3rd round cut in 1960 PGA Championship)
R64, R32, R16, QF, SF = Round in which player lost in PGA Championship match play
"T" indicates a tie for a place

=== Summary ===
| Tournament | Wins | 2nd | 3rd | Top-5 | Top-10 | Top-25 | Events | Cuts made |
|---|---|---|---|---|---|---|---|---|
| Masters Tournament | 2 | 4 | 0 | 9 | 17 | 21 | 25 | 24 |
| U.S. Open | 4 | 2 | 2 | 10 | 15 | 17 | 22 | 19 |
| The Open Championship | 1 | 0 | 0 | 1 | 1 | 1 | 1 | 1 |
| PGA Championship | 2 | 0 | 0 | 5 | 7 | 8 | 10 | 9 |
| Totals | 9 | 6 | 2 | 25 | 40 | 47 | 58 | 53 |

- Longest streak of top-10s – 18 (1948 Masters – 1956 U.S. Open)
- Most consecutive cuts made – 35 (1939 Masters – 1956 U.S. Open)

== U.S. national team appearances ==
Professional

- Ryder Cup: 1947 (winners, playing captain), 1949 (winners, non-playing captain), 1951 (winners), 1967 (winners, non-playing captain)
- Canada Cup: 1956 (winners, individual winner), 1958

== See also ==
- List of golfers with most PGA Tour wins
- List of golfers with most wins in one PGA Tour event
- List of men's major championships winning golfers
- Longest PGA Tour win streaks
- Most PGA Tour wins in a year
