= 1948 PGA Championship =

Coordinates: 38.723°N 90.283°W

Tournament information
- Dates: May 19–25, 1948
- Location: St. Louis, Missouri, U.S.
- Course: Norwood Hills Country Club
- Organized by: PGA of America
- Tour: PGA Tour
- Format: Match play - 6 rounds

Statistics
- Par: 71
- Length: 6,467 yards (5,913 m)
- Field: 133 players, 64 to match play
- Cut: 150 (+8), playoff
- Prize fund: $17,700
- Winner's share: $3,500

Champion
- (United States) Ben Hogan
- def. Mike Turnesa, 7 and 6

Location in the United States
Location in Missouri

The 1948 PGA Championship was the 30th PGA Championship, held May 19–25 at Norwood Hills Country Club in St. Louis, Missouri. Ben Hogan won the match play championship, 7 and 6 over Mike Turnesa in the Tuesday final; the winner's share was $3,500 and the runner-up's was $1,500.

It was Hogan's second and final PGA Championship victory and the second of his nine major titles; the first was a 6 and 4 win in 1946 at Portland, and the third came a few weeks later at the U.S. Open at Riviera. Following a near-fatal auto accident in early 1949, his debilitated condition did not agree with the grueling five-day schedule of 36 holes per day in summer heat. Hogan did not enter the PGA Championship again until 1960, its third year as a 72-hole stroke play event, at 18 holes per day.

Defending champion Jim Ferrier lost in the second round to semifinalist Claude Harmon, 1 up. Harmon defeated Sam Snead in 42 holes in the quarterfinals, but was stopped by Turnesa in 37 holes in the next round.

Hogan became only the second of four players in history to win the U.S. Open and the PGA Championship in the same calendar year. He was preceded by Gene Sarazen in 1922 and followed by Jack Nicklaus in 1980. Through 2016, Tiger Woods is the last to win both, in 2000, part of his Tiger Slam of four consecutive majors.

== Format ==
The match play format at the PGA Championship in 1948 called for 12 rounds (216 holes) in seven days:

- Wednesday and Thursday – 36-hole stroke play qualifier, 18 holes per day;
  - defending champion Jim Ferrier and top 63 professionals advanced to match play
- Friday – first two rounds, 18 holes each
- Saturday – third round – 36 holes
- Sunday – quarterfinals – 36 holes
- Monday – semifinals – 36 holes
- Tuesday – final – 36 holes

== Final results ==
Tuesday, May 25, 1948

Place	Player	Money ($)
1	(United States) Ben Hogan	3,500
2	(United States) Mike Turnesa	1,500
T3	(United States) Jimmy Demaret	750
T3	(United States) Claude Harmon	750
T5	(United States) Johnny Bulla	500
T5	(United States) George Fazio	500
T5	(United States) Chick Harbert	500
T5	(United States) Sam Snead	500

== Final eight bracket ==
Quarter-finals; May 23
Ben Hogan	2&1
Chick Harbert
Jimmy Demaret	5&4
George Fazio
Mike Turnesa	6&5
Johnny Bulla
Claude Harmon	42h
Sam Snead

Semi-finals; May 24
Ben Hogan	2&1
Jimmy Demaret
Mike Turnesa	37h
Claude Harmon

Finals; May 25
Ben Hogan	7&6
Mike Turnesa

== Final match scorecards ==
Morning

Hole	1	2	3	4	5	6	7	8	9	10	11	12	13	14	15	16	17	18
Par	4	3	4	4	4	4	4	3	5	4	3	4	4	5	5	4	3	4
(United States) Hogan	4	3	4	3	3	3	4	3	5	4	3	4	3	5	4	3	3	4
(United States) Turnesa	4	2	4	4	4	4	4	3	4	4	3	4	4	6	6	2	4	4
Leader	–	T1	T1	–	H1	H2	H2	H2	H1	H1	H1	H1	H2	H3	H4	H3	H4	H4

Afternoon

Hole	1	2	3	4	5	6	7	8	9	10	11	12	13	14	15	16	17	18
Par	4	3	4	4	4	4	4	3	5	4	3	4	4	5	5	4	3	4
(United States) Hogan	4	3	3	4	4	4	5	2	5	4	2	3	Hogan wins 7 and 6					
(United States) Turnesa	5	3	4	3	4	4	4	3	4	5	3	4	Hogan wins 7 and 6					
Leader	H5	H5	H6	H5	H5	H5	H4	H5	H4	H5	H6	H7	Hogan wins 7 and 6					

Eagle	Birdie	Bogey
