= Rochester Times-Union Open =

Golf tournament

The Rochester Times-Union Open was a golf tournament played at Oak Hill Country Club, Pittsford, New York. It was played in 1941 and 1942.

The 1941 event was played from August 15 to 17 and was won by Sam Snead with a score of 277, seven ahead of Ben Hogan. Craig Wood led after three rounds but finished with a 78. The 1942 event was played from August 13 to 16. The tournament was won by Ben Hogan. Hogan had a first round 64 to lead by four and increased this to five strokes after a second round 68. Further rounds of 72 and 74 gave him a three shot victory over Craig Wood.

== Winners ==
| Year | Player | Country | Score | To par | Margin of victory | Runner-up | Winner's share ($) | Ref |
|---|---|---|---|---|---|---|---|---|
| 1942 | Ben Hogan | United States | 278 | −2 | 3 strokes | (United States) Craig Wood | 1,000 | |
| 1941 | Sam Snead | United States | 277 | −3 | 7 strokes | (United States) Ben Hogan | 1,200 | |
