= Harry Todd (golfer) =

American golfer

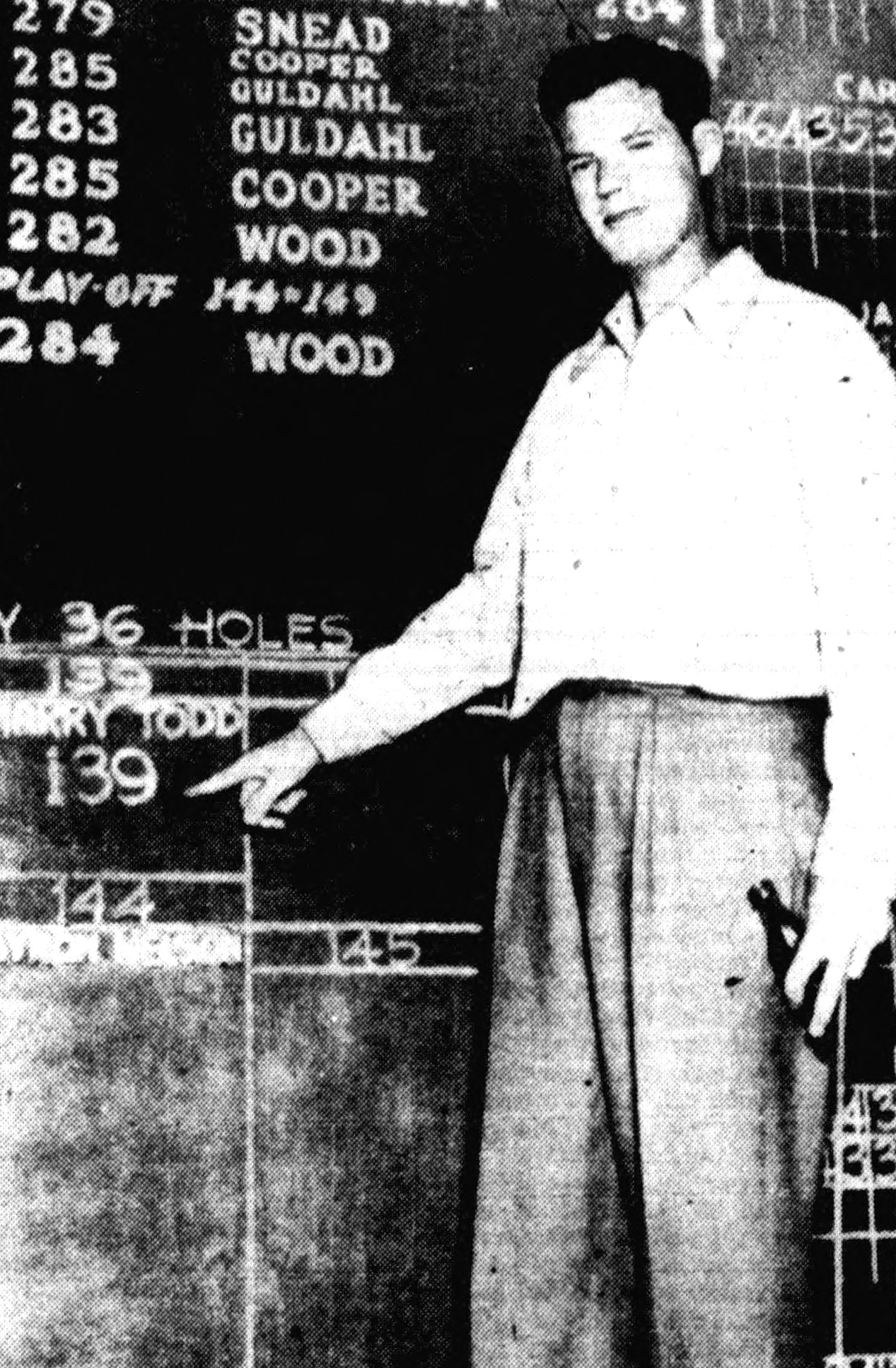
- Todd, circa 1948

Personal information
- Full name: Harry Lorenzo Todd
- Nationality: United States
- Born: November 6, 1916 Dallas, Texas, U.S.
- Died: October 9, 1966 (aged 49) Dallas, Texas, U.S.

Career
- Sport: Golf
- Turned professional: 1944
- Former tour: PGA Tour
- Professional wins: 4

Number of wins by tour
- PGA Tour: 1
- Other: 3

Best results in major championships
- Masters Tournament: T8: 1948
- PGA Championship: T33: 1952
- U.S. Open: T13: 1941, 1947, 1952
- The Open Championship: DNP

Harry Lorenzo Todd (November 6, 1916 – October 9, 1966) was an American professional golfer.

== Early life and amateur career ==
Todd was born in Dallas, Texas. As an amateur, he won the 1939 Western Amateur and finished runner-up to Bud Ward in 1941.

== Professional career ==
In 1944, Todd turned professional. He made his living primarily as a club professional, but did play on the PGA Tour after World War II. He won once, at the 1946 Orlando Open. Also in 1946, he finish one stroke behind Ben Hogan in the inaugural Colonial National Invitation. He led the 1948 Masters Tournament after 36 holes, but finished in a tie for eighth place.

== Amateur wins ==
- 1939 Western Amateur

== Professional wins ==
=== PGA Tour wins (1) ===
No.	Date	Tournament	Winning score	Margin of victory	Runner-up	Ref
1	Dec 1, 1946	Orlando Open	−9 (70-70-67-68=275)	1 stroke	(United States) Johnny Palmer	

=== Other wins ===
- 1947 Ozark Open
- 1948 Ozark Open
- 1951 Odessa Pro-Am (with Don January)
