= Norwood Hills Country Club =

- U.S. National Register of Historic Places
- U.S. Historic district
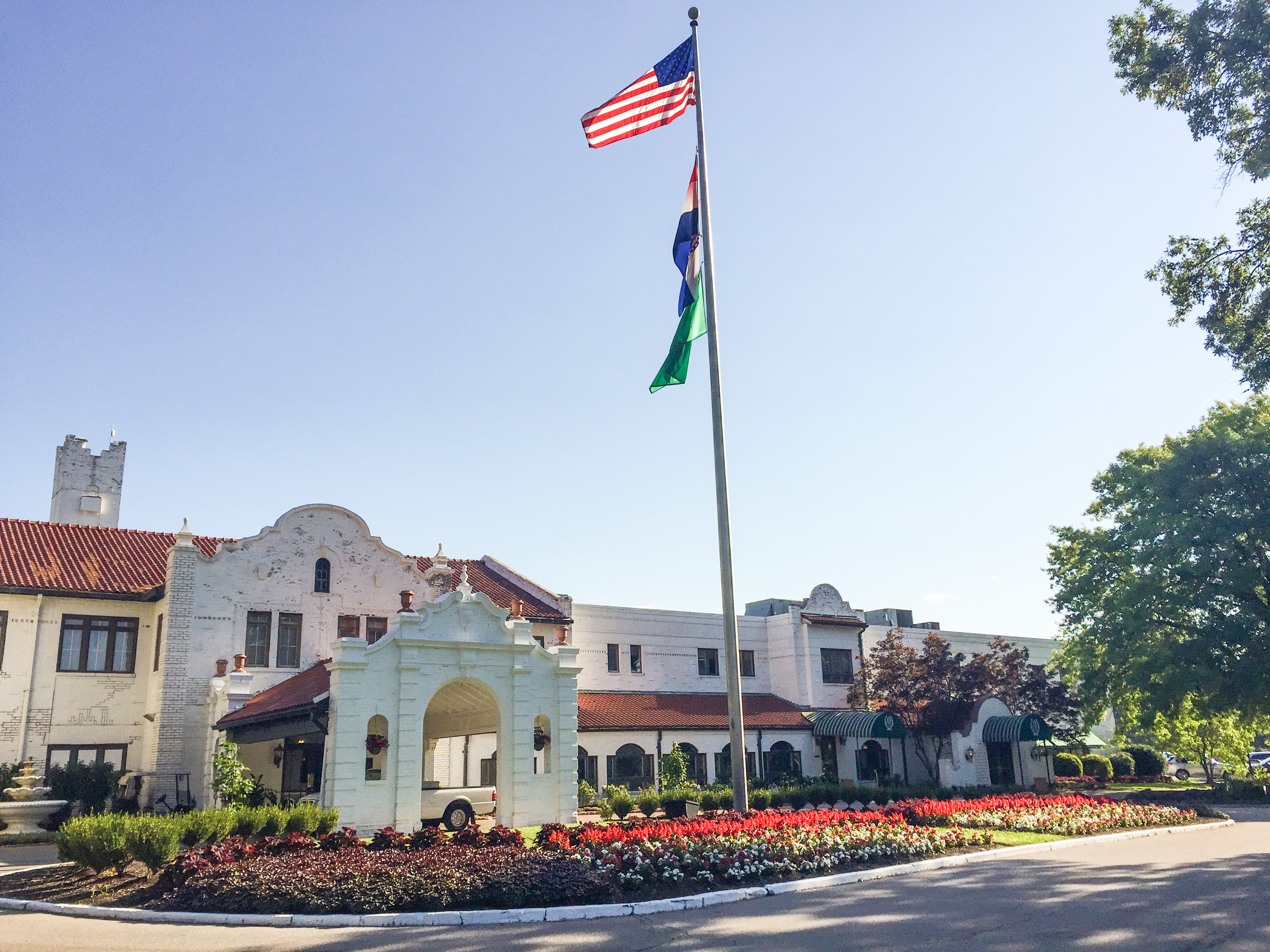
- Clubhouse, July 2017

- Location within St. Louis Location within Missouri Location within the United States
- Location: 1 Norwood Hills Country Club Dr., Jennings, Missouri, near St. Louis
- Coordinates: 38°43′20″N 90°17′2″W
- Built: 1922
- Architect: Stiles, Wayne E.; et al.
- Architectural style: Mission/Spanish Revival
- Website: norwoodhills.com
- NRHP reference No.: 05000084
- Added to NRHP: February 25, 2005

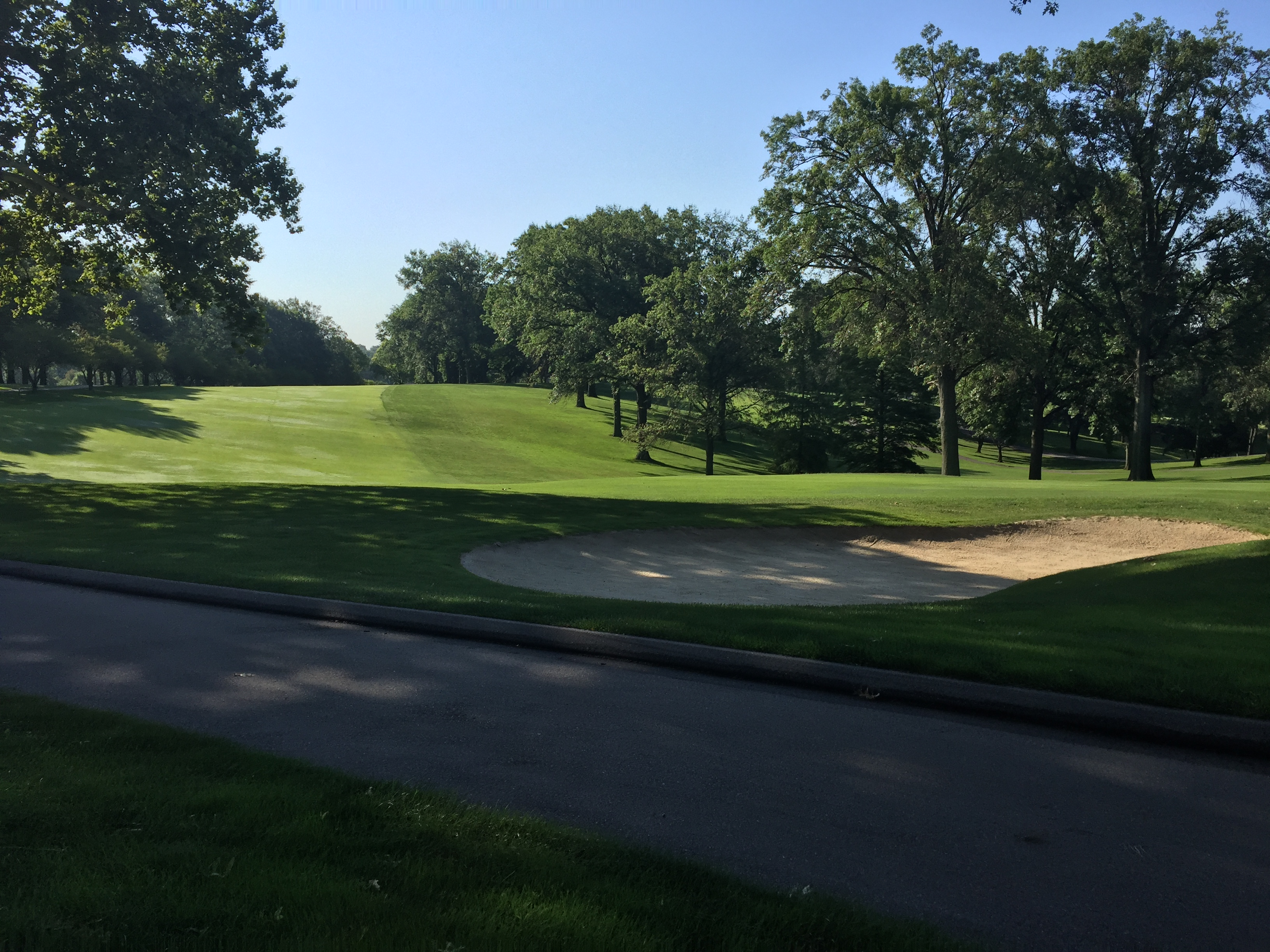
Norwood Hills Country Club

Norwood Hills Country Club, formerly known as North Hills Country Club, is a country club located in Jennings, Missouri. Norwood Hills Country Club has a rich tradition and history dating back to the 1920s, when Norwood found its beginning as North Hills Country Club. It has an excellent youth golf program, and is the home course to Lutheran High School North. Norwood is very youth oriented and friendly. It is also known for its high value to cost ratio compared to other area country clubs. The club has hosted many prestigious events including the National Left-Handed Golfer's Championship in 1936 and 1940, the PGA Championship in 1948 won by Ben Hogan, the LPGA Tour's St. Louis Women's Invitational from 1965 to 1969, the PGA Tour's Greater St. Louis Golf Classic in 1972 and 1973, the U.S. Senior Amateur in 2001, and the U.S. Women's Mid-Amateur in 2018, and the Ascension Charity Classic in 2021.

It was listed on the National Register of Historic Places in 2005.
