= Greater St. Louis Golf Classic =

Golf tournament formerly on the PGA Tour

St. Louis Children's Hospital Golf Classic
Tournament information
- Location: Normandy, Missouri
- Established: 1972
- Course: Norwood Hills Country Club
- Par: 70
- Tour: PGA Tour
- Format: Stroke play
- Prize fund: US$210,000
- Month played: July
- Final year: 1973

Tournament record score
- Aggregate: 268 Gene Littler (1973)
- To par: −12 as above

Final champion
- (United States) Gene Littler
- Location in United States Location in Missouri

The Greater St. Louis Golf Classic was a golf tournament on the PGA Tour in 1972 and 1973. It was played at the Norwood Hills Country Club in Normandy, Missouri.

In 1972, Lee Trevino made birdie on the first two holes Sunday to take over the lead from future PGA Tour Commissioner Deane Beman and eventually beat him by one shot.

In 1973, Gene Littler won by one shot over Bruce Crampton. Sixteen months previously, Littler had been operated on for cancer of the lymph gland.

== Winners ==
Year	Winner	Score	To par	Margin of victory	Runner-up
St. Louis Children's Hospital Golf Classic
1973	(United States) Gene Littler	268	−12	1 stroke	(Australia) Bruce Crampton
Greater St. Louis Golf Classic
1972	(United States) Lee Trevino	269	−11	1 stroke	(United States) Deane Beman
