= Mike Turnesa =

American professional golfer (1907–2000)

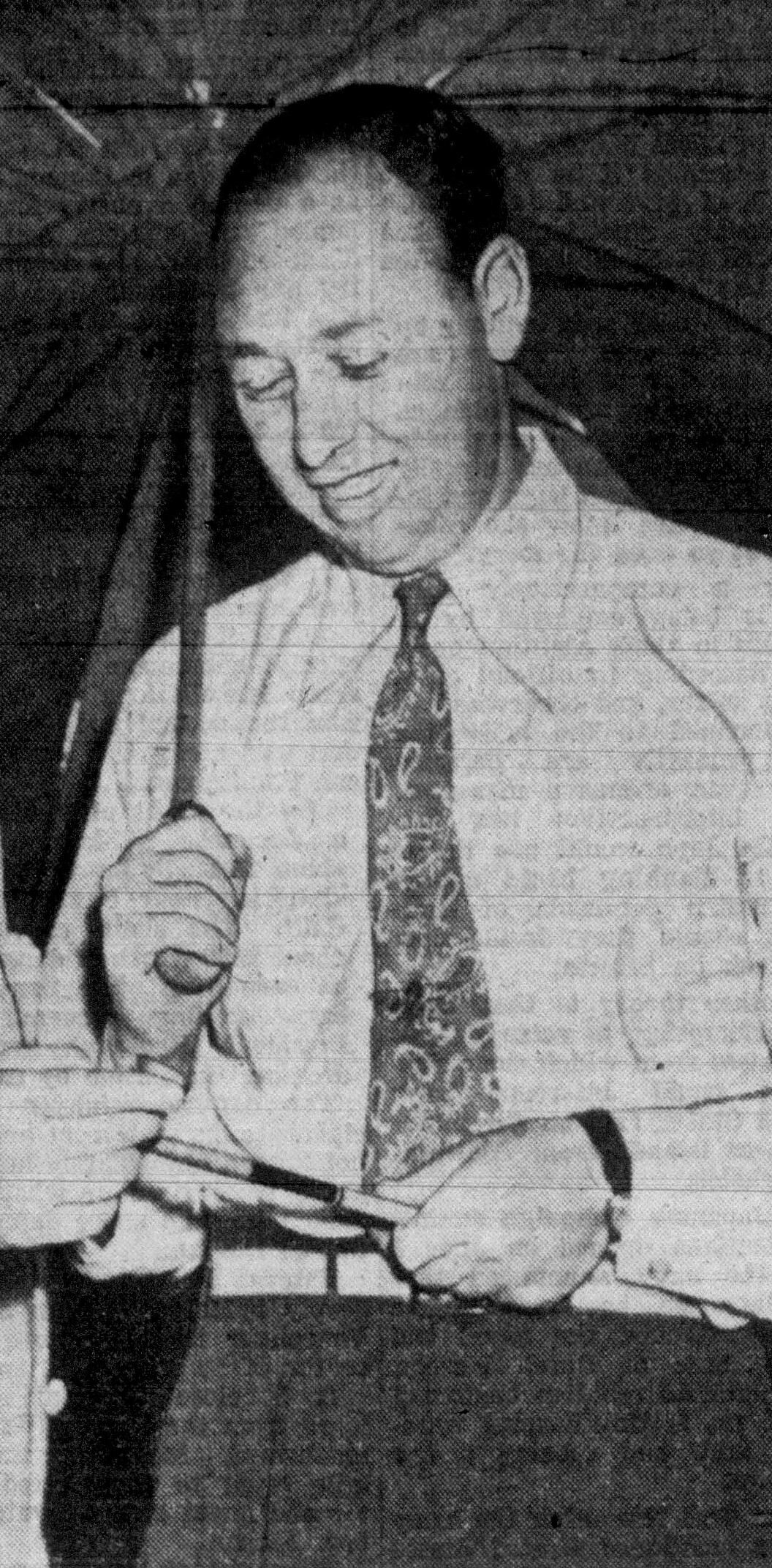
- Turnesa, circa 1942

Personal information
- Full name: Michael C. Turnesa
- Nationality: United States
- Born: June 9, 1907 Elmsford, New York, U.S.
- Died: October 31, 2000 (aged 93) Sleepy Hollow, New York, U.S.

Career
- Sport: Golf
- Status: Professional
- Former tour: PGA Tour
- Professional wins: 10

Number of wins by tour
- PGA Tour: 5
- Other: 5

Best results in major championships
- Masters Tournament: T25: 1935
- PGA Championship: 2nd: 1948
- U.S. Open: T26: 1946
- The Open Championship: DNP

Michael C. Turnesa (June 9, 1907 – October 31, 2000) was an American professional golfer.

== Early life ==
Turnesa was one of seven golfing brothers: Phil (1896–1987), Frank (1898–1949), Joe (1901–1991), Mike (1907–2000), Doug (1909–1972), Jim (1912–1971), and Willie (1914–2001). All but Willie turned professional. The family was referred to as a "golf dynasty" in a 2000 New York Times article.

== Professional career ==
Turnesa's first job in golf came in the pro shop at the Metropolis Country Club. He then became assistant professional at Innwood in the late 1920s before being named "playing professional" representing Fairview in 1931. All told, Turnesa played on PGA Tour for 18 years, winning five times. He then got a job at Knollwood Country Club. He won the 1933 and 1941 Westchester Opens, and the 1949 Metropolitan PGA at Ardsley, but is better known for having finished second to Ben Hogan in both the 1948 PGA Championship and the 1942 Hale America Tournament, the war-time substitute for the U.S. Open. Mike also played in the inaugural Masters Tournament in 1934 along with brother Joe.

== Personal life ==
Turnesa's grandson, Marc Turnesa, has won on the PGA Tour.

== Professional wins (10) ==
=== PGA Tour wins (5) ===
- 1931 Mid-South Open
- 1932 Grassy Spain Course Tournament, Metropolitan PGA Pro Bestball
- 1933 Westchester Open
- 1934 Miami Biltmore Class B

=== Other wins (5) ===
- 1940 Vermont Open
- 1941 Westchester Open
- 1942 Westchester PGA Championship
- 1947 Westchester PGA Championship
- 1949 Metropolitan PGA Championship
