= Furious George (book) =

Book by George Karl

Furious George: My Forty Years Surviving NBA Divas, Clueless GMs, and Poor Shot Selection
- Author: George Karl, Curt Sampson
- Language: English
- Subject: Autobiography
- Genre: Non-fiction
- Publisher: HarperCollins
- Publication date: January 10, 2017
- Publication place: United States
- Media type: Hardcover, paperback, ebook, audiobook
- Pages: 256
- ISBN: 978-0-06-236779-2

Furious George: My Forty Years Surviving NBA Divas, Clueless GMs, and Poor Shot Selection is an autobiography by former professional basketball coach and former player George Karl, and co-author Curt Sampson. It is Karl's debut as an author.

== Synopsis ==
Karl's memoir spans his career playing and coaching in the NBA, including his time as head coach of the Seattle SuperSonics, Milwaukee Bucks, and Denver Nuggets, but does not include his last two years as head coach of the Sacramento Kings. Early versions of the manuscript did include critical commentary of Karl's time in Sacramento, but those pages were not authorized for inclusion in the book due to Karl's settlement agreement with the Kings. The book includes two chapters dedicated to Karl's Seattle years, with particular emphasis on his relationship with Shawn Kemp, Gary Payton and General Manager Wally Walker. Karl also explains how he almost traded Shawn Kemp for Scottie Pippen in 1994, but was unable to execute the trade due to salary cap reasons.

Furious George includes anecdotes from dozens of NBA players and coaches including Phil Jackson, Michael Jordan, Charles Barkley, Allen Iverson and others.

== Release and reception ==
Furious George was scheduled for its release on January 10, 2017, but excerpts from the book, which caused significant controversy among media members and former NBA players, leaked two weeks before that publication. The controversy stemmed from Karl's remarks about fatherhood among some NBA players, specifically his claims that Carmelo Anthony and Kenyon Martin “carried two big burdens” because they had “all that money and no father to show them how to act like a man.” Karl was also critical of J.R. Smith, claiming he had "a huge sense of entitlement, a distracting posse, his eye always on the next contract and some really unbelievable shot selection." Howard Bryant was critical of Karl's comments in the book and wrote, "Karl...offers a glimpse into the minds of the coaches who are intolerant of players, their upbringing and, obviously, their power. If that is the father figure, maybe it's better not to have one."

In the book, Karl also claimed that players used steroids and other performance-enhancing drugs. Commissioner of the NBA Adam Silver later responded to Karl's allegations saying, "I have no reason to believe whatsoever that we have an issue, either as the result of testing or as the result of other information that comes to the league office."

Karl has expressed regret for how the controversial sections of the book were written and apologized for his comments in Furious George. He added that he "didn't write anything in the book that he hadn't said to players' faces."

Basketball Insiders described the memoir as "outspoken and raw." The Denver Post reviewed the book favorably, adding, "George is furious, but he’s just as introspective." One review of Furious George noted that while Karl was critical of several former players and others he had crossed paths with, he was also critical of himself, stating, "The most compelling part of the book is when Karl tackles Karl. He is unsparing here, too."

The book has also been featured in the New York Times, the Los Angeles Times, Rolling Stone and others.
