= Ozark Open =

Golf tournament

The Ozark Open was a golf tournament on the PGA Tour from 1947 to 1951. It was played at Hickory Hills Country Club in Springfield, Missouri. It was a 54-hole event with prize money of $5,000. Harry Todd won the first two editions.

== Winners ==
Year	Player	Country	Score	To par	Margin of victory	Runner-up	Winner's share ($)	Ref
1951	Pete Fleming	United States	205	−14	1 stroke	(United States) Marty Furgol	1,000	
1950	Joe Kirkwood Jr.	United States	201	−18	4 strokes	(United States) Dave Douglas	1,000	
1949	Dave Douglas	United States	203	−16	3 strokes	(United States) Jim Ferrier	1,000	
1948	Harry Todd	United States	200	−19	2 strokes	(United States) Marty Furgol	1,200	
1947	Harry Todd	United States	206	−13	1 stroke	(United States) Dick Metz	1,500	
