= Orlando Open (golf) =

Golf tournament

The Orlando Open was a golf tournament on the PGA Tour from 1945 to 1947. It was played at Dubsdread Country Club in Orlando, Florida. The 1947 event went to a playoff after Jimmy Demaret, Dave Douglas and Herman Keiser were tied on 274 after the 72 holes. There was an 18-hole playoff the following day. Douglas and Demaret were again tied on 71 with Keiser taking 73. There was then a sudden-death playoff with Douglas winning with a birdie 3 at the first extra hole.

== Winners ==
Year	Player	Country	Score	To par	Margin of victory	Runner(s)-up	Winner's share ($)	Ref
1947	Dave Douglas	United States	274	−10	Playoff	(United States) Jimmy Demaret (United States) Herman Keiser	2,000	
1946	Harry Todd	United States	275	−9	1 stroke	(United States) Johnny Palmer	2,000	
1945	Ben Hogan	United States	270	−14	6 strokes	(United States) Jug McSpaden (United States) Johnny Revolta	2,000	
