= Jim Flick =

American golf coach (1929–2012)

Jim Flick (November 17, 1929 – November 5, 2012) was an American golf coach and writer.

== Early life and education ==
Flick was born in Bedford, Indiana on November 17, 1929. He began playing golf at the age of ten, influenced by his father, Coleman Flick, a Bedford City champion. He attended Wake Forest University on a basketball scholarship.

== Career ==
After graduating in 1952, Flick turned professional and initially pursued tournament golf before deciding to focus on a career as a club professional.

Flick served in the United States Army from 1953 to 1954, during the final stages of the Korean War.

In 1955, Flick became an assistant professional at Evansville Country Club in Indiana. Later, he served as PGA head professional at Connersville, Indiana, from 1956 to 1960, and at Losantiville Country Club in Cincinnati from 1961 to 1974. During his tenure with the Southern Ohio PGA Section, Flick served as treasurer and later as president from 1967 to 1969.

In 1986, Flick became the PGA Director of Instruction at Desert Mountain in Scottsdale, Arizona, where he served until 2005. In 1988, he was named PGA Teacher of the Year.

In 1990, Flick began working with Jack Nicklaus who sought Flick's guidance after facing early struggles on the senior tour. From 1991 to 2003, they operated Nicklaus-Flick Golf Schools. Flick also conducted golf schools for ESPN and Golf Digest. In 1999, Golf World recognized him as one of the top ten golf teachers of the century.

Among Flick's other students was 1996 British Open champion Tom Lehman, who credited Flick for emphasizing both swing mechanics and self-confidence.

In 2002, Flick was named into the World Golf Teachers Hall of Fame and the Southern Ohio PGA Hall of Fame.

== Death ==
Flick died from pancreatic cancer on November 5, 2012, in Carlsbad, California.

== Books ==
- Square to Square Golf (1974)
- Square to Square in Pictures (1974)
- How to Become a Complete Golfer (1980)
- Jim Flick on Golf (1997)
- Swing Analysis (2007)
