= Curt Sampson =

- Born: Malcolm Curtis Sampson; January 29, 1952 (age 74); Meriden, Connecticut
- Occupation: Writer
- Writing career
- Genre: Non-Fiction
- Notable works: Hogan (1996); The Masters (1998)
- Website: www.curtsampson.com

Curt Sampson (born January 29, 1952) is an American non-fiction writer and freelance journalist. He is best known for his 1996 biography and New York Times bestseller Hogan published in 1996, the story of one of the most complex and notable athletes of the 20th century and his New York Times bestseller The Masters: Golf, Money, and Power in Augusta, Georgia published in 1998.

Sampson co-authored George Karl's memoir, Furious George, in 2017. It was Sampson's second book about basketball.

== Books ==
Sampson has written more than 14 books in his twenty-two year career as a writer.

- 1992 The Eternal Summer ISBN 0-87833-788-1
- 1993 Texas Golf Legends ISBN 0-89672-298-8
- 1995 Full Court Pressure ISBN 978-0385476324
- 1996 Hogan ISBN 1-55853-387-7
- 1998 The Masters ISBN 0-679-45753-4
- 2000 Royal And Ancient ISBN 0-375-50278-5
- 2002 Chasing Tiger ISBN 0-7434-4212-1
- 2005 The Slam ISBN 1-59486-120-X
- 2005 The Lost Masters ISBN 0-7434-7002-8
- 2007 A Vision – Not a Blueprint ISBN 978-0-9801216-0-5
- 2006 Centennial ISBN 1-933285-47-8
- 2008 Golf Dads ISBN 978-0-618-81248-6
- 2011 A Dallas Classic ISBN 978-0-615-50450-6
- 2012 The War by the Shore ISBN 978-1592407965
- 2017 Furious George ISBN 978-0062367792
- 2019 Roaring Back: The Fall and Rise of Tiger Woods ISBN 978-1-63576-683-7
