= 2009 East Asian Games closing ceremony =

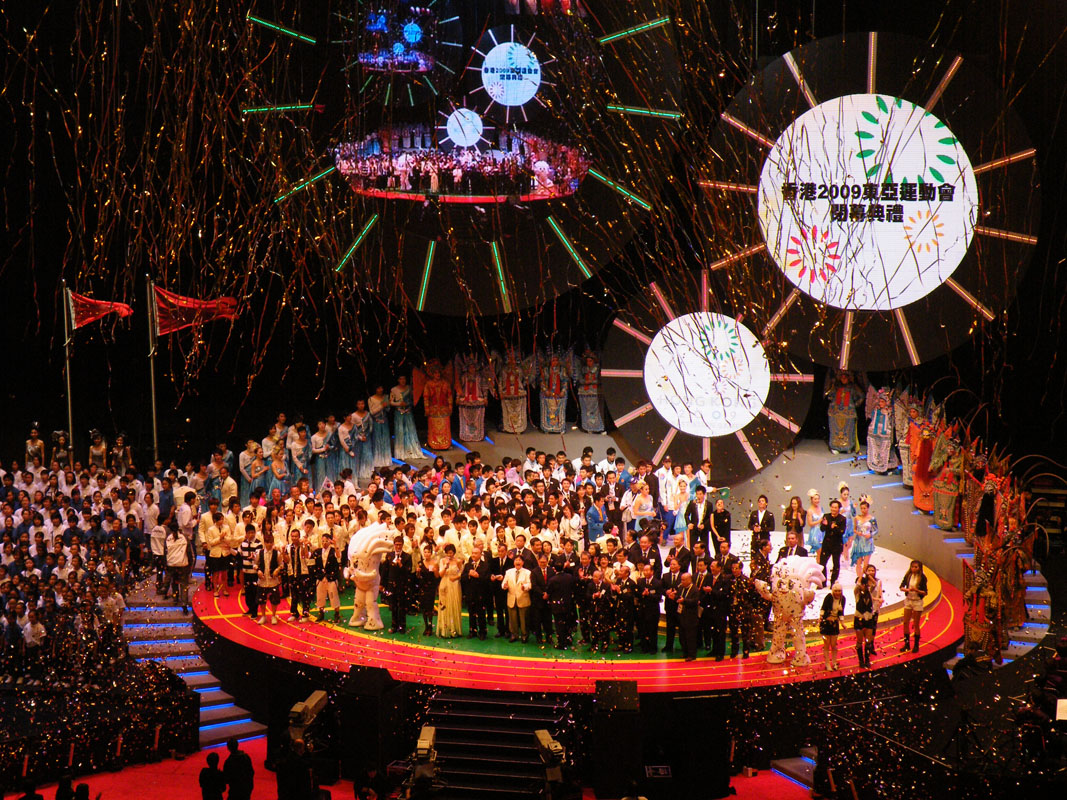
One of the moments of the closing ceremony

The 2009 East Asian Games closing ceremony was an event that took place on 13 December 2009 at Kowloon Hong Kong Coliseum on the last day of the hosting of the 2009 East Asian Games. The show is 2 hours long. The ceremony cost HK$3 million, while the admission cost was HK$200, $400 or $600.

== Entrances ==
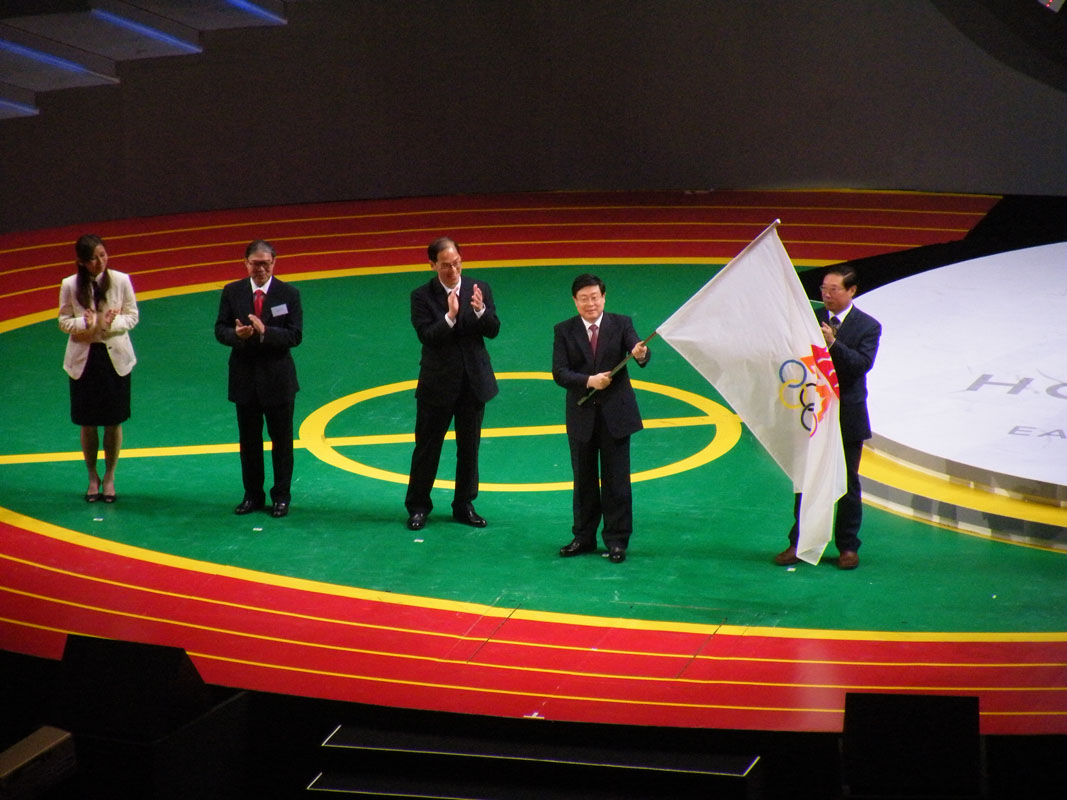
Handing off the East Asian games flag

Countries entered in this order: China, North Korea, Japan, South Korea, Macau, Chinese Taipei, Guam, Hong Kong.

East Asian games president Timothy Fok began with an opening statement; Secretary for Home Affairs Tsang Tak-sing followed with another statement. Chief executive of Hong Kong Donald Tsang announced that the official closing ceremony had begun.

HK squash player Rebecca Chiu carried out the East Asian games flag onto the stage. She passed it to Timothy Fok, who then passed it to Tsang Tak-sing and finally to Tianjin mayor Huang Xingguo who is scheduled to host the 2013 East Asian Games. He then handed the flag to Liu Feng-shan (劉鳳山), secretary of the next East Asian Games organising committee. The flag was then wrapped up by members of the Hong Kong police. A "Meet Tianjin" (2013相約天津) video is broadcast. Tianjin, the city, was introduced.

== Performing arts ==
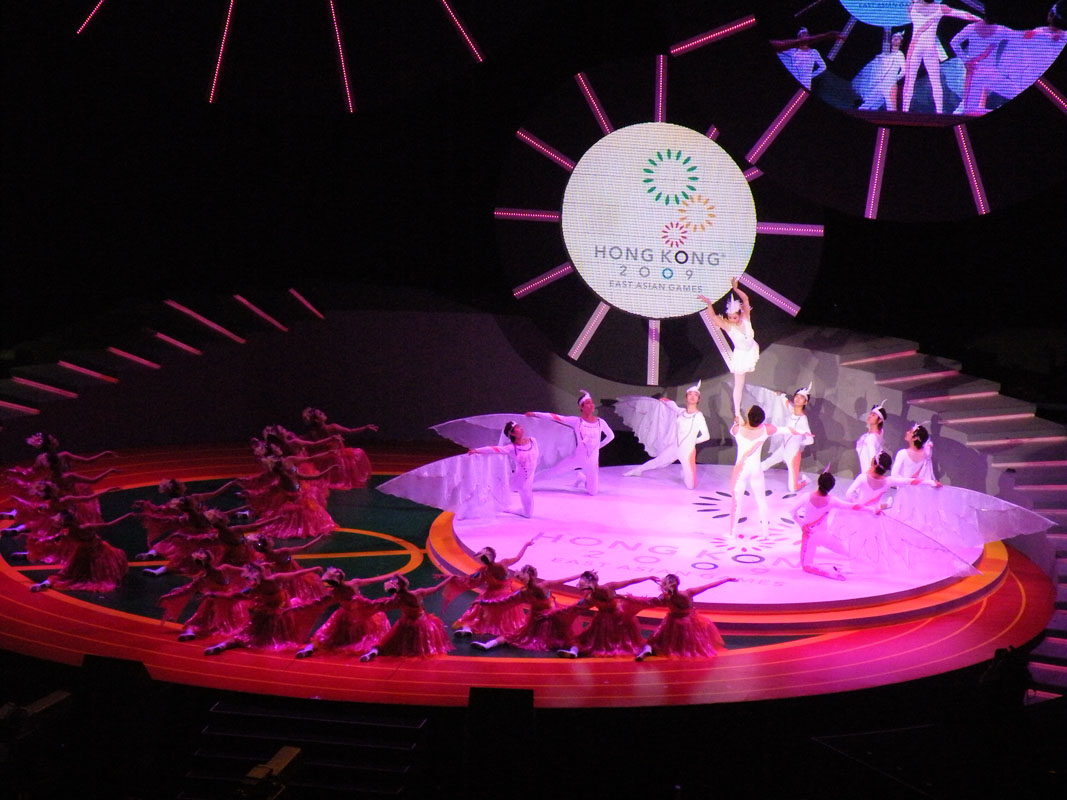
Performing dances

A group of stage dancers from Tianjin began the performance art section on stage. This was split into three sections. First was the Color segment which contained elements of Beijing opera. It was performed by 30 artists including famous opera actor Meng Guanglu. The Flower segment featured dancers performing a number of moves. The angels represent the mascot of the next East Asian Games. The Ocean segment had the dancers dressed in the color of water. They danced on stage and finished this section.

== Finale ==
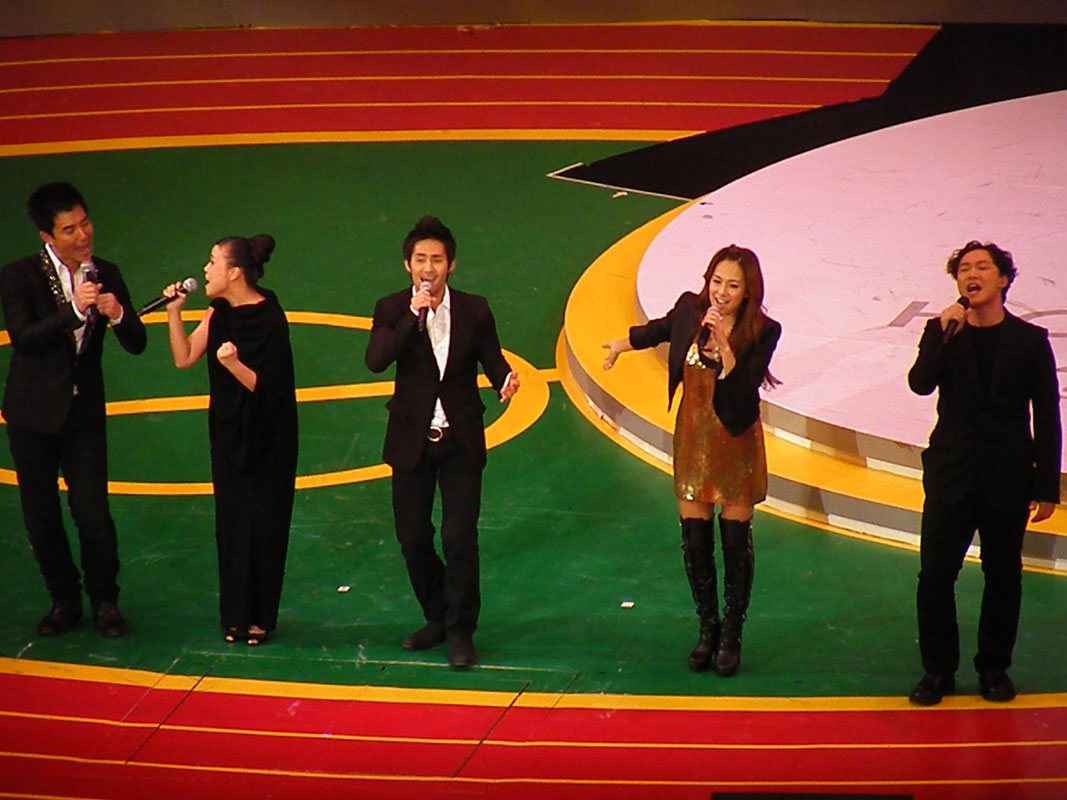
The final performance of You are the Legend

A tribute was paid to the athlete's sportsmanship and spirit. The Hong Kong Chinese Orchestra, led by conductor Yan Hui-chang (閻惠昌), played the song "My Pride". PRC's Dadawa then performs "Heaven sing" (天唱). Kousuke Atari of Japan then performs (各自遠颺). Richie Ren of Taiwan performed "Friend, change you have not" (朋友，你變了沒有). Chae Yeon of South Korea then performed "Opening" (熱力開場). This is completed by Hong Kong's Eason Chan "Road, to this point" (路，一直都在). An international version of You are the Legend was performed by all five singers together.

== See also ==
- 2009 East Asian Games opening ceremony
- 2008 Summer Olympics closing ceremony
