= KPSP =

KPSP may refer to:

- Kowloon Park Swimming Pool in Hong Kong
- KPSP-CD, a Class-A low-power digital television station (channel 18, virtual 38) licensed to Cathedral City, California, United States
- The ICAO code for Palm Springs International Airport
