= Subic International Golf Club =

- Interactive map of Subic International Golf Club
- 14°48′52.7″N 120°18′44.5″E

Club information
- Location: Binictican Drive, Olongapo, Philippines
- Established: 1960s
- Type: Private
- Owner: Subic Bay Metropolitan Authority
- Operator: Subic Smart Community Corp.
- Total holes: 18
- Website: https://www.subicgolf.com/

Binictican Golf Course
- Designed by: Desmond Muirhead
- Par: 71

Subic International Golf Club (SSCC) is a golf club at the Subic Bay Freeport Zone in Olongapo, Philippines.

== History ==
=== US base era ===
The Binictican Golf Club originated in the 1960s. It used to be a golf course frequented by American servicemen when the United States still ran the U.S. Naval Base Subic Bay. Civilians can only access the facility only upon an invite. It was known as the Binictican Valley Golf Course (BVGC) and started with a 9-hole course.

The Americans decided to vacate the area after the 1991 Mount Pinatubo eruption buried the golf course in ashes and the US Bases Treaty was terminated.

The Subic Bay Metropolitan Authority (SBMA) under chairman Dick Gordon mobilized volunteers to secure the properties left by the Americans in September 1992.

=== Subic Bay Golf Course and Country Club (1996–2007) ===
In 1995, the SBMA and the Universal International Group (UIG) of Taiwan entered a deal to develop the 18-hole Binictican Golf Course into a 27-hole golf course meeting Professional Golfers' Association of America standards In April 1996, the UIG assigned its subsidiary, Subic Bay Golf Course and Country Club (SBGCC) to develop the course.

However the UIG has entered in a contract dispute with the SBMA under chairman Gordon. After the UIG failed to meet an alleged promise to fulfill the renovation in time of the 1996 APEC meeting and the finished work in 1997 was judged to fail standards by the SBMA.

In June 8, 2007, the SBMA took over the golf course citing UIG's failure to meet financial obligations and alleged regulatory violations.

=== Subic Leisure World (2010–2015) ===
The SBMA re-possessed the golf course and leased it to South Korean firm Hanafil Corporation. The course was renamed Subic Leisure World, Inc. Little renovation was made with Hanafil returning the property to SBMA in 2015.

=== Subic International Golf Club (2016–present) ===
In 2016, SBMA chairman Roberto Garcia announced that Japanese firm Smart Community Co. Ltd. of Masafumi Miyamoto will develop the Binictican Golf Course. The subsidiary, Subic Smart Community Corp. (SSCC) took over.

The Binictican Golf Course opened as the Subic International Golf Club (SICGC) on March 22, 2019.

== Golf course ==
The Subic International Golf Club is an 18-hole, 71 par golf course. It covers an area of 93.5 hectares (231 acres), with the golf course itself being 82.2 hectares (203 acres). It has three irrigation lakes. It also has a clubhouse and dormitory.
