= Golfsmith =

Defunct American corporation

Golfsmith International Holdings Inc.
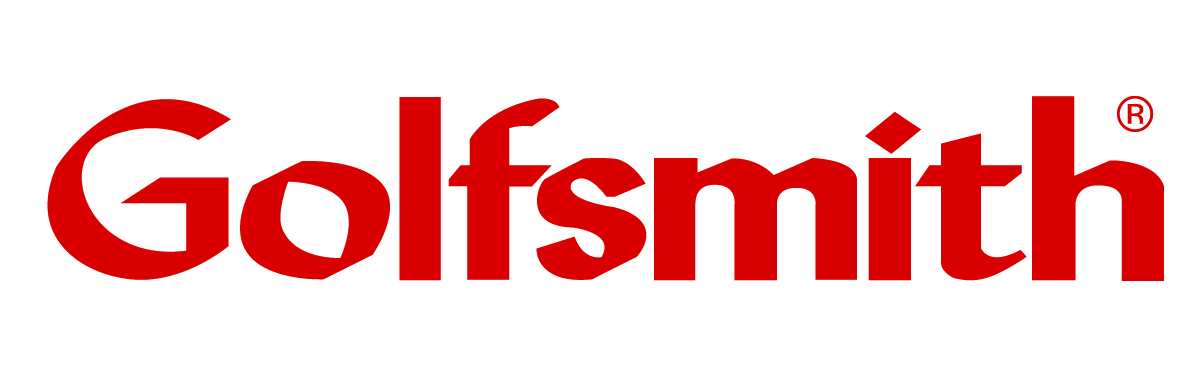
- Company type: Subsidiary
- Traded as: Nasdaq: GOLF
- Industry: Retail
- Founded: 1967; 59 years ago
- Founders: Carl and Barbara Paul
- Defunct: 2017
- Fate: Chapter 11 bankruptcy Liquidation sale
- Successor: Dick's Sporting Goods
- Headquarters: Austin, Texas, U.S.
- Number of locations: 78 (June 2011)
- Parent: OMERS
- Website: Archived official website at the Wayback Machine (archive index)

Golfsmith International Holdings Inc. was an American golf specialty retailer based in Austin, Texas. Each store, along with golfsmith.com, housed a wide selection of golf clubs, shoes, apparel, gadgets and gear from all the major brands as well as proprietary offerings. They also offered custom club fitting, lessons and services for golfers.

Founded by Carl and Barbara Paul in 1967, Golfsmith began as a custom golf club components supplier. As of August 2014, the company had expanded to comprise over 100 retail stores in over 20 states, selling golf clubs, performance apparel, skills improvement products, etc. Golfsmith generated net revenues of over $338 million (~$479 million in 2024) in fiscal year 2009.

In May 2012, Canadian pension fund OMERS announced plans to take over Golfsmith for $6.10 per share, and the transaction was completed in July 2012. OMERS also owns Golf Town, the largest golf retailer in Canada. The two brands operated as Golfsmith International, the largest golf specialty retailer in the world.

On November 3, 2016, Golfsmith was approved by the U.S. Bankruptcy court of Delaware to be acquired by Dick's Sporting Goods after being purchased for $69 million (~$88.1 million in 2024) dollars.

== History ==
In 1967, Carl Paul and his wife Barbara Paul founded Golfsmith in their Edison, New Jersey home. Inspired after taking up the game of golf, Carl recognized an unfilled niche in the golf industry: the design and distribution of custom golf clubs and their components, along with instruction about how best to assemble them. Beginning with a typewritten, hand illustrated catalog, Golfsmith first became successful by helping transform club repair shops across the country into custom golf club makers.

In the early 1970s, Carl’s brother Frank joined the family business, and it moved to Austin, Texas in 1972. The first Golfsmith storefront was a components showroom housed in 6,000 square feet (560 m^{2}) of unused army barracks. In 1975, the Pauls embarked on their first consumer retail expansion by creating The Golfsmith Store accessory catalog. In 1976, the company first grossed more than $1 million.

Golfsmith operated primarily as a catalog-based business until 1992. That year the company moved to its present headquarters location, a 40-acre campus that includes the corporate offices, a practice range, a 30,000-square-foot (2,800 m^{2}) Golfsmith store, and 240,000 square feet (22,000 m^{2}) of shipping and distribution facilities.

Golfsmith’s retail expansion began in 1995 with the opening of retail stores in Houston, Denver and Dallas. Golfsmith’s initial public offering of stock was in June 2006. As of August 2014, Golfsmith operated over 100 stores in over 20 states.

In October 2002, Golfsmith sold a majority share in the company to First Atlantic Capital.

On June 15, 2006, Golfsmith International Holdings Inc. made its initial public offering and began trading under NASDAQ symbol GOLF.

On September 14, 2016 Golfsmith International Holdings, Inc filed for Chapter 11 bankruptcy protection, owing millions to Nike, Inc, Callaway Golf Company, and others.

On November 3, 2016, Golfsmith was approved by the U.S. Bankruptcy court of Delaware to be acquired by Dick's Sporting Goods after being purchased for $69 million (~$88.1 million in 2024) dollars.

=== Brands ===
Golfsmith offers golf clubs, apparel, accessories and practice gear from brands like Adams Golf, Adidas, Bridgestone, Bushnell, Callaway, Cleveland, Cobra, ECCO, FootJoy, MacGregor, Mizuno, Nike Golf, Odyssey, OGIO, PING, Scotty Cameron, SkyGolf, Srixon, Sun Mountain, TaylorMade, Titleist, and Wilson Staff.

=== Proprietary brands ===
In 1998, Golfsmith secured a $30 million private placement with DLJ Investment Partners. The private placement helped fund the acquisitions of Lynx Golf Inc., Black Rock Golf Corp. (maker of Killer Bee golf clubs) and Snake Eyes Golf Clubs Inc. In 2003, the company acquired Zevo Golf. In May 2009, Golfsmith acquired the intellectual property rights to MacGregor Golf.

Alongside products from external manufacturers, Golfsmith offered complete golf clubs, component club parts, apparel and golf accessories under its own Lynx, MacGregor, Killer Bee, Snake Eyes, Golfsmith, XPC, Zevo, ZTech, Tour Trek, Profinity and MaggieLane brands.

=== Clubmaking ===
Beginning in 1970, Golfsmith offered the first golf club maker training programs to teach custom club fitting, assembly and repair. Golfsmith now conducts clubmaking schools throughout the year, at three levels of expertise: the Complete Clubmaker’s Training School, the Advanced Clubmaking, Fitting and Repair School, and the Master Craftsman School.

In 1980, Golfsmith established the Golf Clubmakers Association (GCA) to support and guide the growing number of clubmakers around the world. The GCA offers three levels of professional accreditation: Accredited Clubmaker, Professional Clubmaker and Advanced Clubmaker. In 1988, Golfsmith hosted the first GCA International Conference.

=== Lessons ===
==== Golfsmith Learning Center ====
In 1993, Golfsmith collaborated with teacher Harvey Penick to develop the Austin-based Harvey Penick Golf Academy, which instructed golfers in the methods and philosophies of the Little Red Golf Book coauthor. The academy was renamed the Golfsmith Learning Center in 2009.

==== Partnership with GolfTEC ====
In 2004, Golfsmith formed a partnership with GolfTEC, a Denver-based national chain of golf instruction facilities. As of August 2010, GolfTEC provided golf lessons in 57 Golfsmith stores.

== Tennis products and services ==
In 2003, Golfsmith acquired six San Francisco-based Don Sherwood Golf and Tennis stores and began offering a wide selection of major-brand tennis merchandise. At one point, the company sold tennis gear in over 55 of its stores nationwide, as well as online and via direct-to-consumer marketing. Golfsmith also offered tennis racquet restringing by technicians certified by the United States Racquet Restringers Association. As of 2013, Golfsmith no longer sold nor serviced tennis related products.

== Stores ==
As of August 2014, Golfsmith operated over 100 stores in over 20 states, including Alabama, Arizona, California, Colorado, Connecticut, Florida, Georgia, Illinois, Indiana, Kansas, Michigan, Minnesota, New Jersey, New York, North Carolina, Ohio, Oregon, Pennsylvania, Tennessee, Texas, Virginia and Wisconsin.

Golfsmith stores had putting greens, driving ranges and digital swing analysis equipment inside most locations, and tennis courts inside some.

In 2009, Golfsmith introduced the Golfsmith Xtreme brand of superstores, which is larger, with more interactive features like indoor hitting bays and sand bunkers.

== Bankruptcy/ceasing of operations ==
A few different factors contributed to Golfsmith's bankruptcy, the primary factor being Golfsmith not slowing store openings as its business began to decline. Golfsmith was opening dozens of stores yearly during the 00's while golf was seeing an increase in popularity--mostly attributed to Tiger Woods. Golfsmith took this opportunity to establish itself as the largest golf retailer in North America (164 stores before the bankruptcy). The stores Golfsmith operated were 15,000-40,000 sq. ft each (the average being 23,000 square feet). This led to expensive operating costs, which hurt the company, especially when the golf business began to weaken. Massive amounts of inventory sat in Golfsmith stores losing value as the newer models came out. This was the reason Golfsmith owed $5.5 million to Callaway Golf Co., $5.1 million to Taylormade Golf Co. Inc., $3.5 million to Nike, $2.3 million to PING Inc. and $2.1 million to Titleist. Golfsmith CEO David Roussy blamed "a recession-driven decline in golf participation and an oversized brick-and-mortar retail presence" for its situation. Golfsmith was purchased at auction by Dick's Sporting Goods. Most Golfsmith stores closed on December 28, 2016. Any remaining Golfsmith stores were converted to Dick's Sporting Goods or its Golf Galaxy brand. Hilco Liquidation purchased approximately 80 million dollars of Golfsmith's inventory for approximately 8 million dollars. This led to steady price discounts of everything in the stores, including clubmaking shop tools, hitting bays, shelves, and other fixtures. Hilco dropped prices up to 95% off the original retail price in the final hours of operation.

== Website and mobile app ==
Golfsmith’s website, golfsmith.com, offered online shopping, product reviews by customers, streaming videos about products, and services such as golf handicap tracking and live online customer service.

In 2007 and 2008, golfsmith.com was cited for exemplary customer service in the E-tailing Group’s annual Mystery Shopping Survey. In 2009 and 2010, Internet Retailer put golfsmith.com on its "Hot 100" list of the best e-commerce sites.

In 2010, Golfsmith launched a new mobile website and iPhone application.

== Catalogs ==
Golfsmith published and distributed multiple print catalog titles throughout the year, including a general golf equipment catalog, one for custom golf club makers and one offering only tennis products. The company was the first golf retailer to publish a catalog of equipment and fashion exclusively for women.

== International operations ==
Golfsmith operated Golfsmith Canada LLC, a club components distribution center in Ontario, Canada.
