= South China AA Sports Complex =

Multi-purpose sports venue in Hong Kong

Coordinates: 22°16′32″N 114°11′15″E

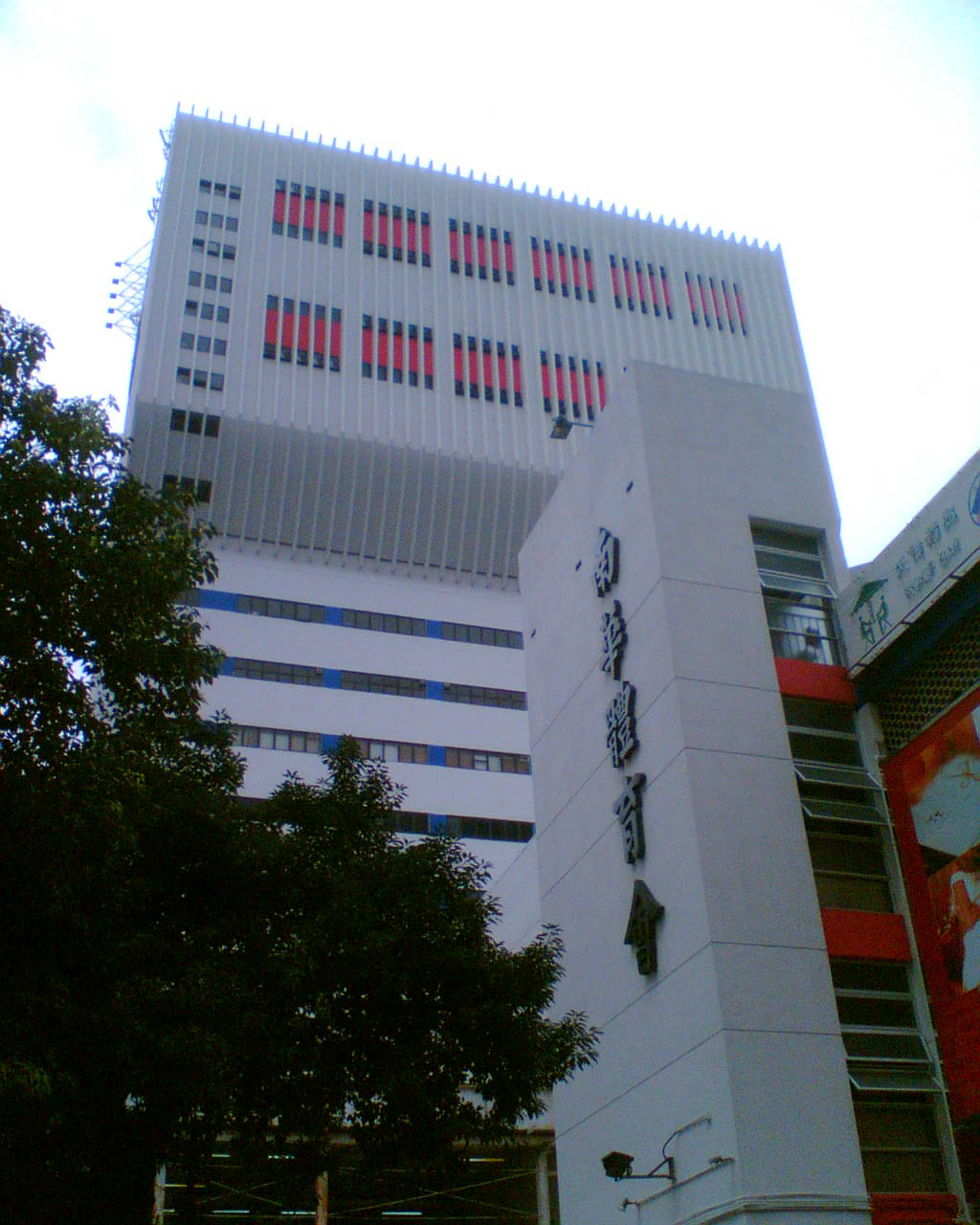
SCAA Sports Complex (back)

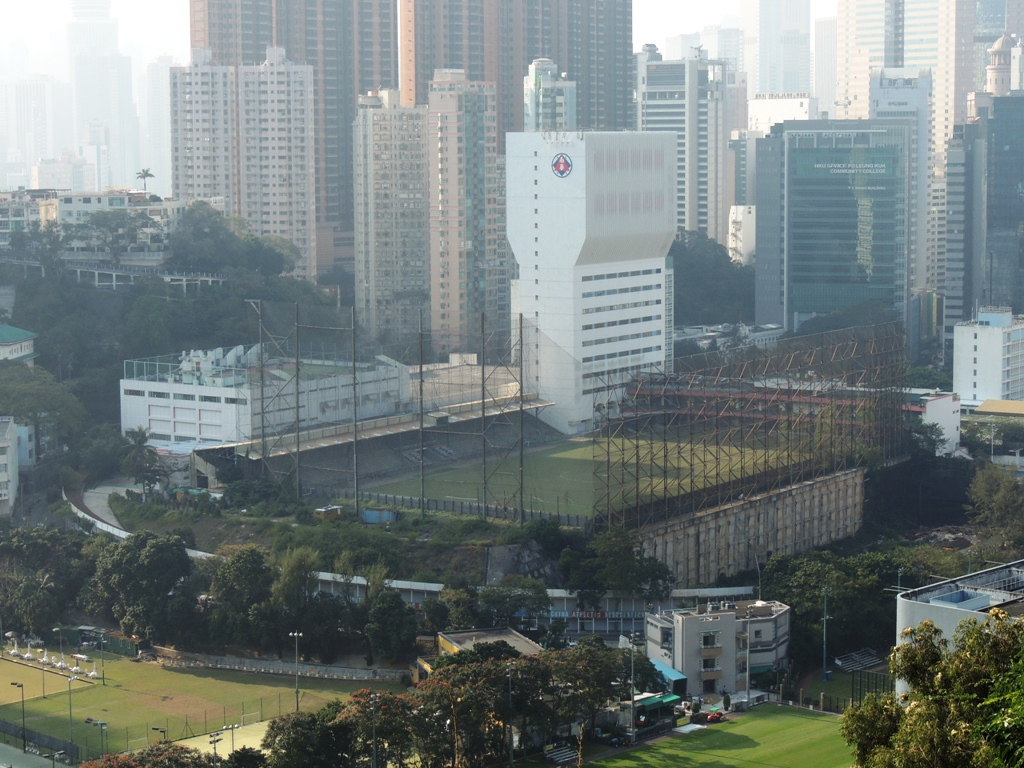
SCAA Sports Complex (far back) and the stadium (front)

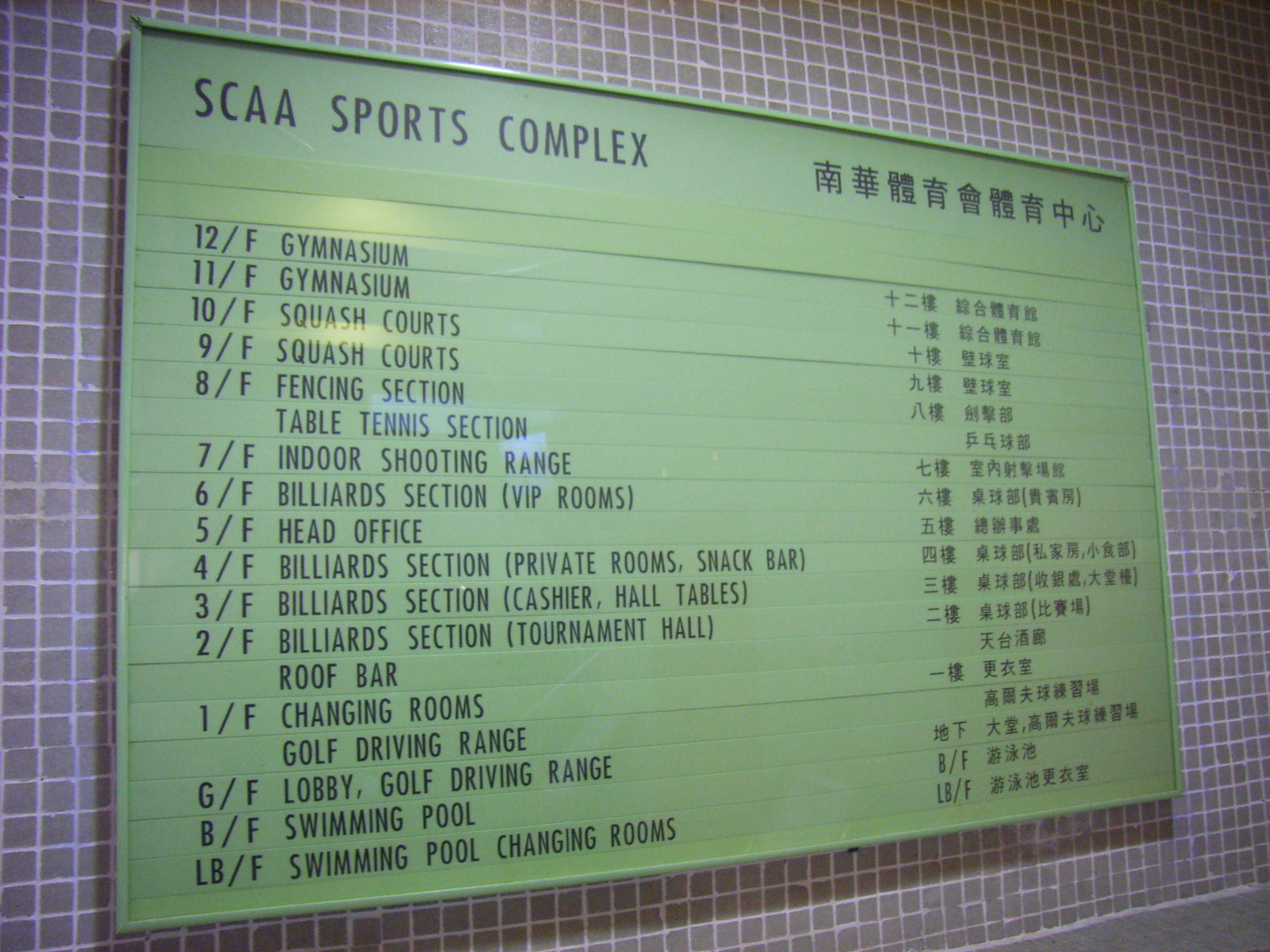
The guide of SCAA Sports Complex

South China AA Sports Complex (Chinese: 南華體育會體育中心), also known as SCAA Sports Complex, or the Sports Complex, the High Block (Chinese: 高座) is a multi-use building in Hong Kong. It consists of swimming pools, golf driving range, billiards halls, indoor shooting ranges, fencing halls, table tennis tables, squash courts, and gymnasiums. It is owned by the South China Athletic Association. South China AA Stadium and South China AA Sports Centre (the Low Block) are next to the building.

== History ==
The complex broke ground in the 1980s. Structure underground was completed in 1983. The superstructure was completed in 1987 and opened in the next year.

== Events ==
On top of the events of the South China Athletic Association (SCAA), the Complex also held other competitions, such as a table tennis invitational tournament that co-held by The Wharf (Holdings), Po Leung Kuk, Elegant Watch & Jewellery and the South China AA. Another table tennis tournament by the Chinese Manufacturers' Association of Hong Kong, also used the facility of the Sports Complex.

The shooting event of 2009 East Asian Games was held in the 7/F of the Complex, after the government failed to build its own facility in time.

== Controversies ==
The sports complex is built on Crown Land (since 1997 known as Government Land in the law) with special land lease, which limited its purpose. However, Apple Daily accused that the athletic association violate the land lease by allowing non-members to use its canteen by joining its special-class of "eat-only" membership for HK$20 per month.

A sport bar on the 2/F of the Complex, also subsidized their customers with HK$150 voucher, as a compensation for the full annual membership fee of the SCAA, HK$120.

== Location ==
The complex is located on Caroline Hill Road, Causeway Bay, very near the Hong Kong Stadium.
