= Robert MacAndrew (golfer) =

Golfer and blacksmith (1869–1951)

Robert G. MacAndrew
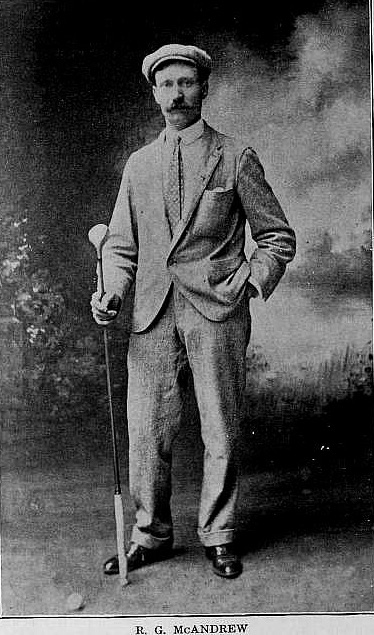

Personal information
- Full name: Robert Grieve MacAndrew
- Nickname: RG
- Born: 1869 St Andrews, Scotland
- Died: May 4, 1951 (aged 81–82) Holbrook, Massachusetts, US
- Spouse: Mary Lamond Murray
- Children: Agnes, Mary, James, Charlotte, Robert, John, Charles, Ruth

Career
- Sport: Golf
- Status: Professional

Best results in major championships
- U.S. Open: 40th: 1904

Robert Grieve MacAndrew (1869 – April 4, 1951) was a Scottish-born golf professional and a master blacksmith who in his youth became proficient in making golf clubs. He was born and raised in St Andrews, Scotland, and from 1895 to 1898 worked as a club maker there. In 1898, at the age of 29, he was recruited to the U.S. to supervise the manufacture of golf clubs for the A.G. Spalding Company in Massachusetts. To supplement his income, MacAndrew gave golf lessons and helped in constructing golf courses with the goal of saving money to pay for the passage of his wife and children to come from Scotland to the U.S.

There was an increase in the popularity of golf in the U.S. about this time which fueled demand for golf course construction. MacAndrew's career timing could not have been better. He developed a reputation as golf course designer and golf instructor, and quit work in golf club manufacturing to became a golf pro at various country clubs. He competed in the U.S. Open Championship in 1904. Each of his four sons became a professional golfers at various country clubs in the United States.

== Early life ==
MacAndrew was born in St Andrews, Fifeshire, Scotland, in 1869. He had an eighth grade education. His wife was Mary Lamond Murray (1872–1930) who died at age 58. MacAndrew had eight children: Agnes, Mary, James, Charlotte, Robert, John, Charles and Ruth. He became a U.S. citizen in 1918.

== Immigration to the U.S. ==
MacAndrew arrived in New York in 1899 to go to Chicopee Falls, Massachusetts, to supervise the manufacture of golf clubs for the Spalding Company. During this time, Spalding became embroiled in a dispute with its former supplier, Overman Wheel Company, and business suffered. MacAndrew was subsequently offered a job by one of Spalding's competitors, Crawford, McGregor, and Canby, another of the early U.S. golf club makers. When his family arrived in 1900, they all moved to Dayton, Ohio, the home of Crawford, McGregor & Canby.

== Career ==
MacAndrew began to develop a reputation, said 1930 Tennessean sportswriter Tony Scheffer, "as a teacher of note turning out some wonderful golfers under his diligent tutelage". MacAndrew secured a contract to design a golf course in Nashville for a new country club called the "Nashville Golf and Country Club" in 1901. Nashvillians were becoming interested in golf, but there were only crude golf courses available then, some with holes of only 50 yards. A group of prominent citizens had aspirations of forming a golf-based country club with a golf course rivaling the quality of those in Scotland; they hired MacAndrew to design and build it. When he arrived in Nashville, MacAndrew rejected their chosen site at Cumberland Park (Note: The Cumberland Park mentioned here no longer exists. It was at the Nashville Fairgrounds at the intersection of Wedgewood and Rains Avenues. It should not be confused with a modern-day Nashville park by the same name, located on the east bank of the Cumberland River at downtown Nashville.) (later the site of Tennessee State Fairgrounds). MacAndrew told the club president he would have to purchase an alternate site, and the club acquiesced by obtaining land on the Whitworth estate near West End Avenue at Bowling Avenue in Nashville. MacAndrew returned to lay out and build a nine-hole course. After completion, he returned to Dayton, where his fifth child (Robert) was born. In 1902, the Nashville group requested him to return, this time as their permanent golf professional and greenskeeper. He moved his family to Nashville, where his sixth child (John) was born.

In 1904, MacAndrew left Nashville to accept a position as golf pro at The Wollaston Club in Milton, Massachusetts, and, as second project, to design a new golf course in New York. He competed in the tenth U.S. Open in July 1904. He later moved on to work as golf pro/greenskeeper at West Warwick Country Club and Potowomut Country Club, both in Rhode Island.

== A family of golf professionals ==
MacAndrew's four sons followed his career path to become professional golfers: James, Robert, John (Jock) and Charles. Two of them (James and Jock) predeceased him.

- James W. MacAndrew (1895–1942) worked in Nashville as the first pro at Richland Country Club in Nashville and later in Fall River, Massachusetts;
- Robert P. MacAndrew (1901–1963) was the golf pro at Mount Pleasant Golf Club in Lowell, Massachusetts, in 1927;
- John (Jock) A. MacAndrew (1904–1928) was the pro at Nashua, New Hampshire. He won the Massachusetts State Caddie Championships in 1918 and 1919 and competed in the U.S. Open in 1926 and 1927. Jock and Charles, both under 19, shot 70 and 71 respectively in the qualifying round of the Massachusetts Junior Championship in 1924. Jock died at age 24, of internal hemorrhage from ulcerative colitis;
- Charles E. MacAndrew (1907–1952) worked at Laconia, New Hampshire and Burlington, Vermont. He was the pro at Burlington Country Club for 13 years, retiring in 1951. He defeated Gene Sarazen to win the New England Open in 1931. Nearly 500 guests attended "Charlie MacAndrew Day" ceremonies on August 4, 1951 and established the annual "Charles MacAndrew Memorial Golf Tournament" in his honor, first played in 1953. In 2018, the MacAndrew Memorial 65th tournament was held.

MacAndrew's grandson Donald Jock MacAndrew (Jock's son), became a thoroughbred horse jockey. He rode "Saggy", the horse that famously defeated the previously unbeaten Citation (ridden by Eddie Arcaro) in the Chesapeake Trial Stakes at Havre de Grace Racetrack on April 12, 1948. The Baltimore Sun called it "The horse racing upset that stands for the ages".

== Death ==
Robert G. MacAndrew died at age 81 on April 4, 1951, in Holbrook, Massachusetts, at the home of his granddaughter. He is buried at Mount Wollaston Cemetery in Quincy, Massachusetts.
