= South China AA Stadium =

Multi-purpose stadium in Hong Kong

South China Stadium
- Caroline Hill Stadium (加山場)
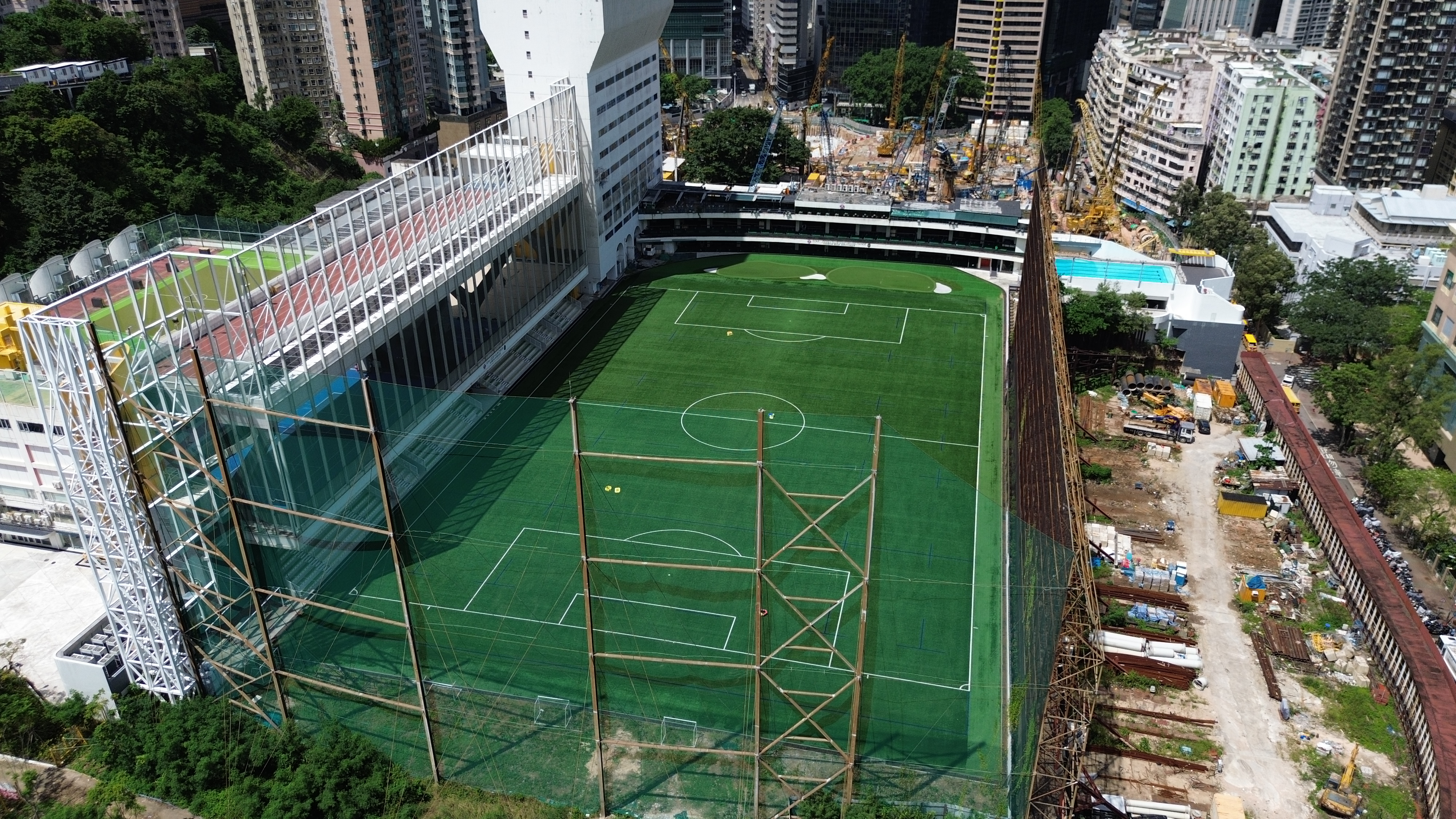
- The Sports Complex (the tall white building) and the Stadium in 2023. The complex atop the stand contains a tennis court, a beach volleyball court and a 60-metre jogging track. In the centre are the tee boxes from the driving range.

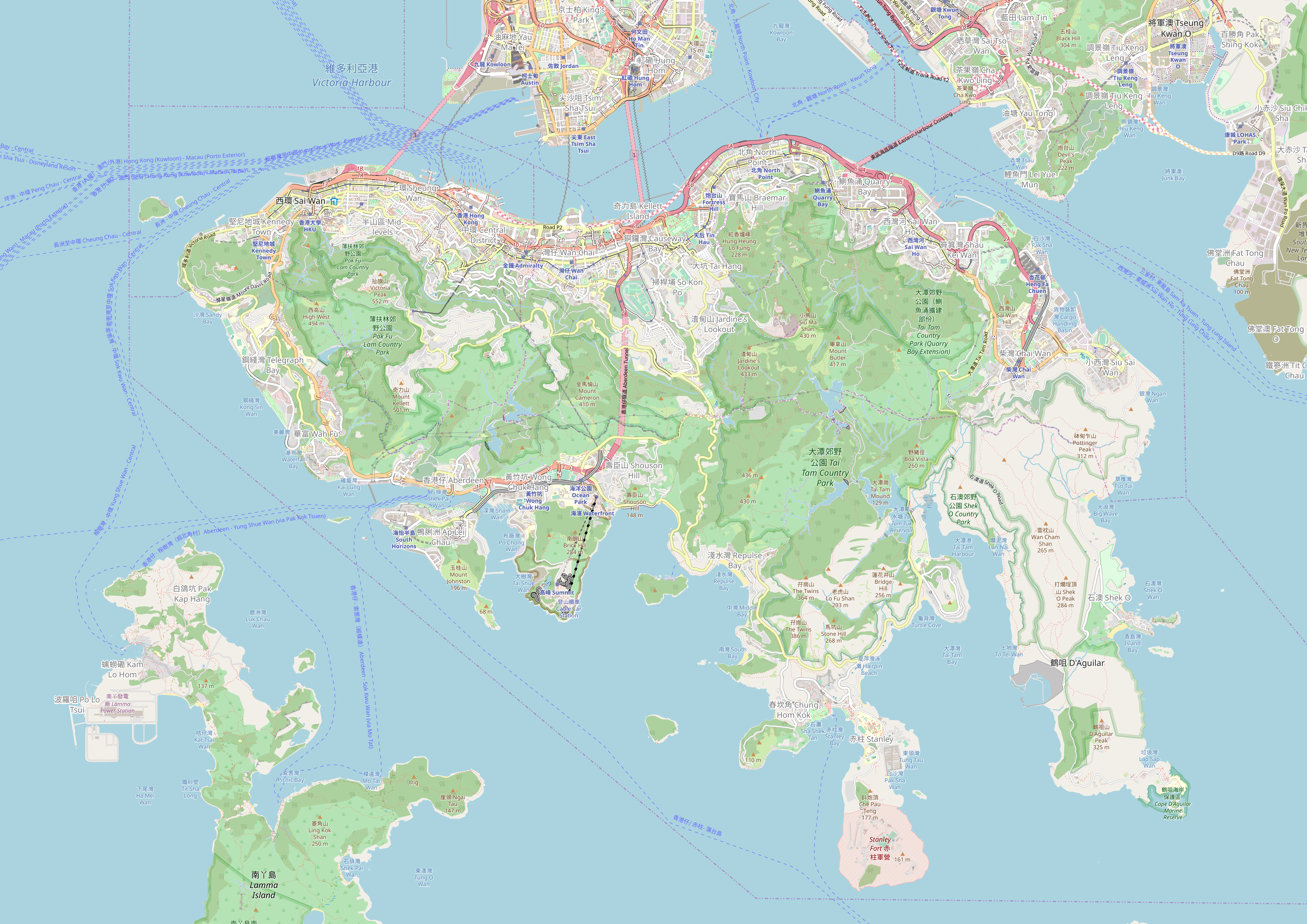
- Location of the stadium in Hong Kong Island and in Hong Kong South China Stadium (Hong Kong)
- Address: 88 Caroline Hill Road, Causeway Bay, Hong Kong Island, Hong Kong
- Coordinates: 22°16′33″N 114°11′15″E
- Owner: South China Athletic Association
- Operator: South China Athletic Association
- Capacity: 1,000
- Surface: Artificial turf
- Field size: 100 x 68 metres (109 x 74 yards)

Construction
- Groundbreaking: c. 1927 the 1950s (second generation); 2012 (third generation)
- Built: 1934
- Renovated: 1953, 2012–2021
- Demolished: the 1950s (first generation) the 1980s to 2012 (second generation)

Tenant
- South China Athletic Association

The South China AA-Jockey Club Stadium (Chinese: 南華會賽馬會運動場), also known as the Caroline Hill Stadium (Chinese: 加山場), is a multi-use stadium in Hong Kong. It is currently owned by the South China Athletic Association.

The stadium was originally designed to accommodate up to 12,000 spectators when it was opened in 1953.

== History ==
South China Athletic Association (SCAA), under the chairman Lee Hysan, acquired the Crown land land lease of the present site in Caroline Hill in 1927. A clubhouse and spectator stands were built in 1934.

During the World War II, the facilities were occupied by the Japanese force. In 1946, South China AA resumed the control of the facilities in the Caroline Hill as well as in King's Park. New four-sized stands were built in 1953. In 1966, a bowling centre was built around the stadium, which was followed by a sports centre (the Low Block) in 1976.

=== Re-developments ===
From the 1980s to circa 2012, three of the four stands of the stadium were demolished for re-development. One side of the stand was re-developed into the Sports Complex (the High Block) and a golf driving range, which the superstructure was completed in 1987. The football pitch also served as the greens.

In 1991, a re-development plan of the stadium was announced. The proposed new complex had three stands and a dormitory for footballers, all but one of the stands were demolished afterwards. The land use of dormitory was approved by the regulator in 1998.

In 2005, the club attempted to build a hotel on the former site of a stand. However, the application of the change of land use, was rejected by the Town Planning Board.

On 25 October 2012, The Hong Kong Jockey Club Charities Trust announced that the SCAA's facilities: the football pitch, the remaining football stand and the driving range, would undergo a major redevelopment with funding of HK$126 million from the trust. New or improved facilities will include a third-generation artificial turf pitch with a covered spectator stand.

The stadium was officially re-opened after a nine year renovation on 26 November 2021. The total cost of the project was $370 million, with $170 million coming from the Jockey Club and the other $200 million coming from South China.

== Location ==
The stadium is located on 88 Caroline Hill Road. According to the club, it is located in the Causeway Bay area, however, in government's urban planning zones, it is part of Wong Nai Chung Outline Zoning Plan. The stadium is very near to the Hong Kong Stadium.

Behind the last remaining stand of the stadium, were the Bowling Centre and the Sports Centre of the club.
