= Response ZT =

The Response ZT 615 by MacGregor Golf was a putter which was used by Jack Nicklaus to win the 1986 Masters Tournament. Although the company had planned to sell only 6,000 for the year, the day after Nicklaus' victory they were deluged with 5,000 orders. They sold 300,000 that year.

The putter had an odd appearance, with an oversized aluminum head. When designer Clay Long first showed it to Nicklaus in July 1985, Nicklaus asked, “Is this a joke? Nicklaus almost abandoned the club after missing the cut for the Honda Classic that year, due to the large but lightweight club's sensitivity to wind gusts which caused him to miss a six-inch putt. However, he had the head weighted with lead for a heavier "feel" and went on to perform spectacularly with it in the Masters.

"Once I got used to the lightness of the putter, I could make the ball roll over better with it," he said. "Why I'm not still using it, I don't have any idea. I should probably go back to it."

"Oddly enough, it's the only golf club I won a major with that I don't have," according to Nicklaus. "One of my boys must have given it away. Someday, somebody will look in their garage and find my old putter."

Nicklaus Golf Equipment manufactured a limited number of about 1,000 replicas in 2006 to commemorate the 20th anniversary of the event; the new version sold for $199, compared to the original's price of $89.
