= Kowloon Park Swimming Pool =

Swimming pool in Tsim Sha Tsui, Hong Kong

Coordinates: 22.3018°N 114.1703°E

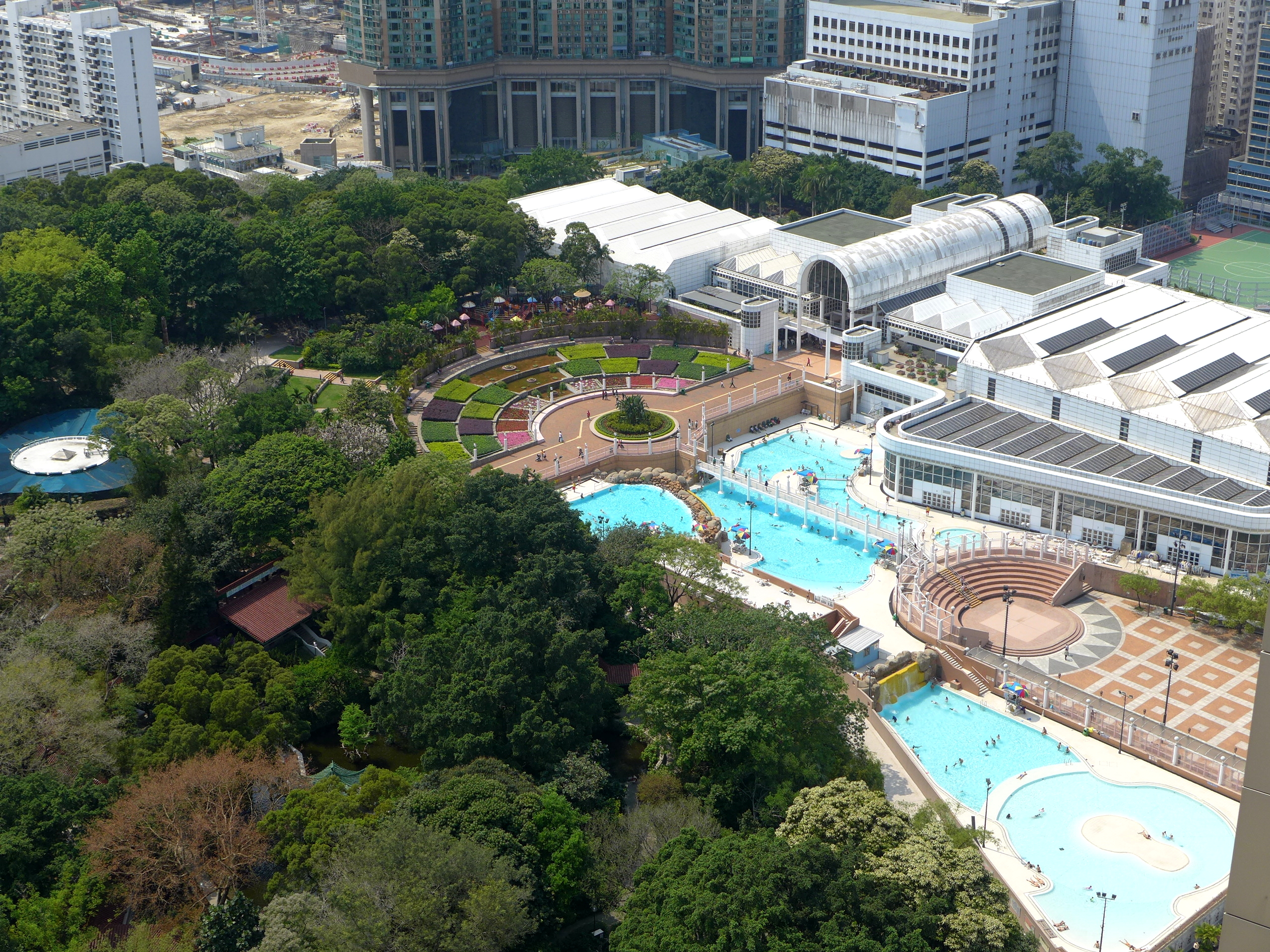
- Aerial view
- Interactive map of Kowloon Park Swimming Pool
- Location: 22 Austin Road; Tsim Sha Tsui, Kowloon
- Operator: Leisure and Cultural Services Department
- Type: Indoor and outdoor

Construction
- Opened: 12 September 1989
- Architect: Derek Walker Associates

Website
- Official website

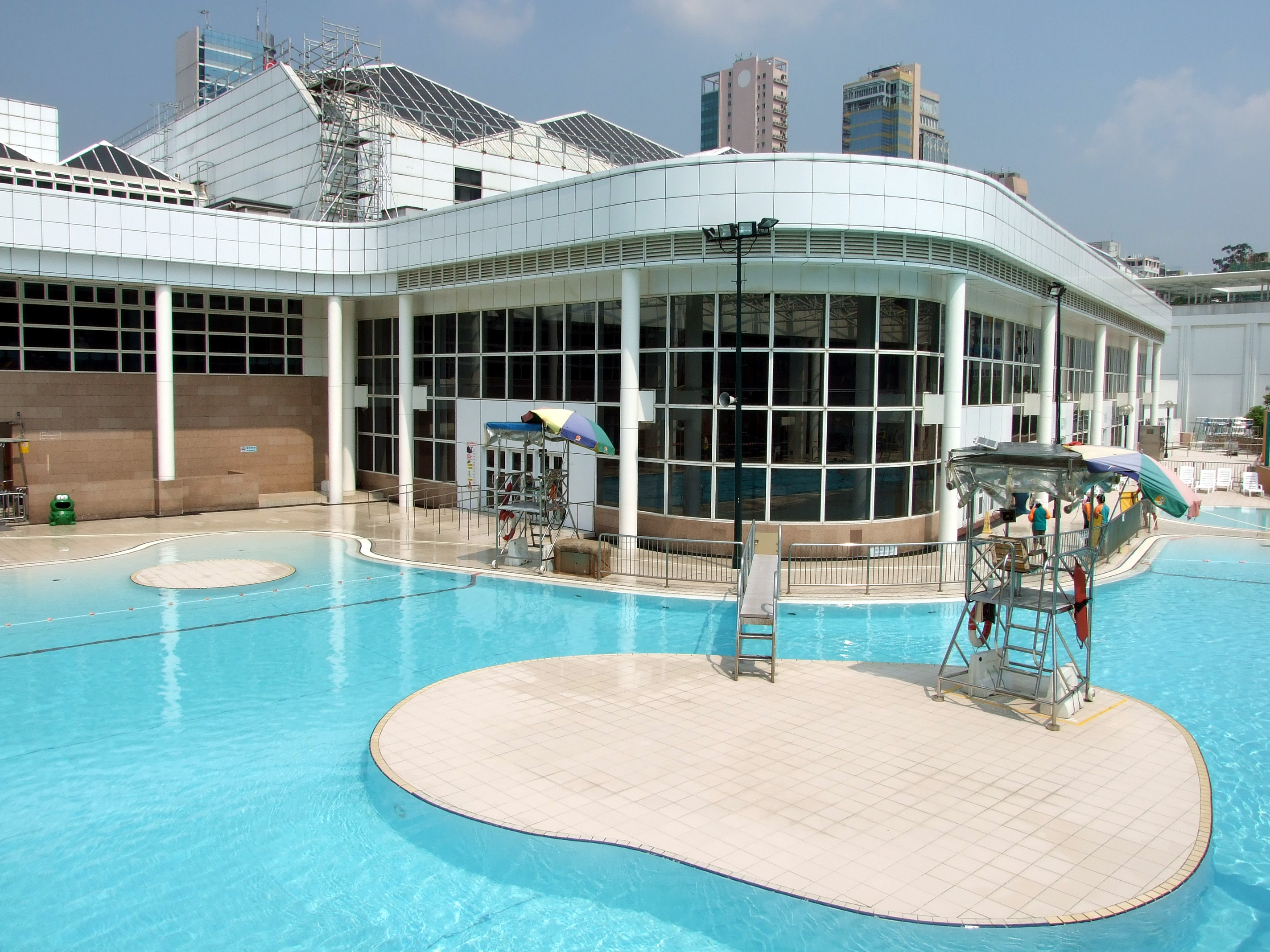
Outdoor leisure pool no. 1

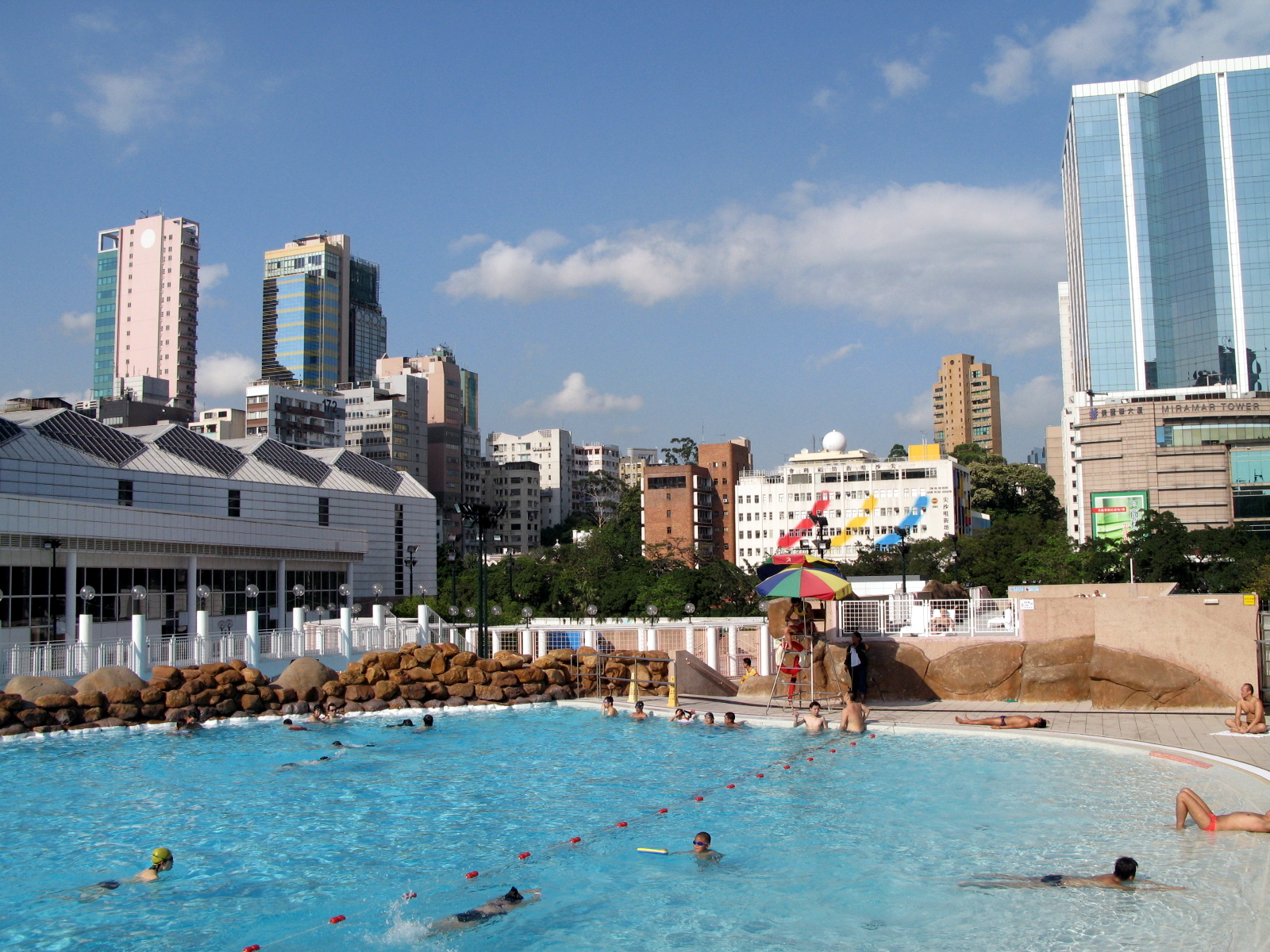
Outdoor leisure pool no. 2

The Kowloon Park Swimming Pool (Chinese: 九龍公園游泳池), located in Tsim Sha Tsui, Kowloon, is one of the most heavily used swimming pool complexes in Hong Kong, serving over 2,000 swimmers daily. It includes four indoor heated pools, including an Olympic sized 50-metre main pool, two 25-metre training pools, and a 20-metre diving pool. There are also several outdoor leisure pools.

As one of the best-equipped swimming pools in Hong Kong, it is the only venue in Kowloon suitable for staging major or international swimming events.

== History ==
The Kowloon Park Swimming Pool was built as part of a greater redevelopment and expansion of Kowloon Park that was completed in 1989 under the sponsorship of the Royal Hong Kong Jockey Club. The swimming complex-cum-indoor games hall was designed by a joint venture between United Kingdom-based Derek Walker Associates and Hong Kong firm Simon Kwan and Associates. It was engineered by BuroHappold, and the main contractor was Shui On. It opened on 12 September 1989 and was originally managed by the Urban Council.

The HK$6-million bilingual scoreboard, the "most sophisticated of its kind in Hongkong", was custom-built for Kowloon Park Swimming Pool by Omega SA. An integrated timing system allowed the scoreboard to display individual times for each of the competition pool's eight lanes. A special computer terminal could be used to input Chinese characters, which could be displayed along with Latin characters using the scoreboard's 20,000 lamps. The scoreboard drew interest from the sporting community, and a delegation from China visited the swimming pool to view and assess its capabilities.

Other innovative features employed for the first time in Hong Kong were the depth-adjustable main pool, which allows the water depth to be changed according to the function, as well as the use of ozone disinfection for water treatment to reduce reliance on chlorination.

In 2000 the Urban Council was disbanded by the government, and management of the swimming pool became the responsibility of the newly formed Leisure and Cultural Services Department (LCSD).

From 2007 to 2009, major improvement works were carried out. The indoor free form leisure pool was converted into one of the 25-metre training pools, and a trampoline room extension was constructed. The pool hosted the 2009 East Asian Games, and ahead of this event facilities were added for swimming officials, marshals, doping control, first aid, equipment and the media.

== Facilities ==
The complex has four indoor heated pools. The 50-metre main pool has a spectator stand, digital scoreboard, and electronic timing equipment. The moveable pool bottom allows the depth to be adjusted. The 25-metre training pool on the same level as the main pool was converted from a leisure pool ahead of the 2009 East Asian Games. Another 25-metre training pool, on level 2, is equipped with an accessible ramp, and on certain days of the week is open only to the elderly, persons with disabilities, and those with chronic diseases. There is also a diving pool and trampoline room.

The outdoor area has three leisure pools open on a seasonal basis. These are popular in the summer months. The outdoor area also has a circular, shallow pool for young children, toilets, and a sunbathing area.

== Opening Time ==
- First:06:30-12:00
- Second:13:00-17:00
- Third:18:00-22:00
- Tuesday 10:00 closed- 17:00

== Capacity and patronage ==
The complex can accommodate a maximum of 1530 swimmers at one time, and has an annual attendance of more than 1 million visitors. It is the most heavily visited swimming pool in Hong Kong, with daily attendance of more than 2,000.

== Recent developments ==
In April 2017, a large fence was built down the middle of the main outdoor leisure pool, separating it in two. The Leisure and Cultural Services Department (LCSD) stated that the fence helped improve safety by improving lifeguard sight-lines, which are partly obstructed by the columns supporting the public footbridge above the pool. Swimmers protested the construction as unnecessary, and said that it diminished the character of the pool as well as its recreational value, as some visitors enjoyed the shade beneath the bridge. Legislative councillor Leung Yiu-chung echoed these sentiments, stating that the fence was excessive and urged the LCSD to find a balance between safety and public amenity.

Parts of the pool complex were refurbished in 2020. The main pool's floating platform (in use since 1989) and starting blocks were replaced, and general maintenance and repairs were carried out.
