= MacGregor Golf =

Sport equipment manufacturer

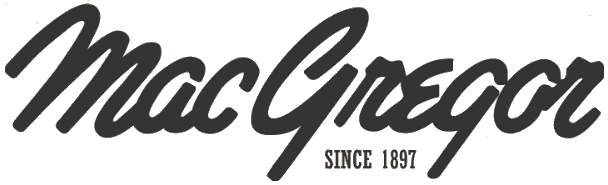
- Industry: Sports equipment
- Founded: 1897; 129 years ago as "Crawford, McGregor & Canby Company"
- Headquarters: Albany, Georgia, U.S.
- Products: Golf clubs, bags, accessories
- Website: www.macgregorgolf.com

MacGregor Golf is a sports equipment manufacturing company based in Albany, Georgia, which specializes in golf. MacGregor currently produces a wide range of golf clubs, bags, and accessories.

The company roots can be traced to 1829, with the establishment of "Dayton Last Company", a maker of hand-carved wooden lasts for footwear. Adding partners in subsequent decades, current company was officially founded in 1897 as the "Crawford, McGregor & Canby Company", becoming one of the first American manufacturers of golf clubs—items which also included heavy percentages of wooden components.

== History ==
=== Origins ===
A 1922 advertisement for MacGregor golf clubs, made by the Crawford, McGregor & Canby Co. of Dayton, Ohio

MacGregor Golf dates its corporate origins to 1829, when Archibald and Ziba Crawford arrived in Dayton, Ohio, to begin the manufacture of hand-carved wooden footwear lasts for the manufacture of shoes. Their product was successful and they expanded the operation to include four or five hired workmen under the firm name Dayton Last Works, with a concentration on shoe lasts, which firm continued for a number of decades.

The firm was joined by John McGregor in 1874 and Edward Canby in 1886 so that by 1897 the company had taken the name "Crawford, McGregor & Canby", with its base of operations remaining in Dayton, being officially constituted. Golf shafts of the early 20th century being made of wood rather than the metal, fiberglass, and other materials of today, in 1897 the company made the transition from footwear lasts to clubmaking, becoming one of the first American manufacturers of golf clubs.

During the 1930s Crawford, McGregor & Canby was acquired by the Goldsmith Company to form MacGregor-Goldsmith. The new owners found the name "MacGregor" to be stronger than "Goldsmith" in the marketplace and subsequently changed the name of the firm to MacGregor.

=== Ownership changes ===
Having previously been owned by the Wickes Corporation, and before that the Brunswick Corporation, Amer Sports acquired a majority 80% stake in MacGregor from Jack Nicklaus in the mid-1980s for a reported $8 million. With MacGregor's fortunes deteriorating, in 1997 Amer sold the company to a British-led consortium. The firm changed hands again the following August with its acquisition by equity investment company The Parkside Group.

In 2003, MacGregor regained control of MacGregor Golf Japan from Suntory, and in 2006, along with Greg Norman co-acquired the Greg Norman Collection brand of sports apparel from Adidas. In May 2009, MacGregor was acquired by Golfsmith International and Norman stepped down as chairman. Golfsmith owned the company until the retailer fell into bankruptcy in 2016. Golfsmith's assets, including MacGregor Golf, were later acquired by Dick's Sporting Goods.

== Sponsorship deals ==
In addition to its long association with Jack Nicklaus, MacGregor has had endorsement deals with many top professional golfers including José María Olazábal, Greg Norman, and Lee Janzen.

== See also ==
- Response ZT (golf club)
