= 2009 East Asian Games =

Event in the annual East Asian Games

V East Asian Games
- Host city: Hong Kong
- Motto: Be the Legend (創造傳奇一刻)
- Teams: 9
- Athletes: 2,377
- Events: 262 events in 22 sports
- Opening: December 5, 2009
- Closing: December 13, 2009
- Opened by: State Councilor Liu Yandong
- Athlete's Oath: Li Ching
- Judge's Oath: Au Yeung Kwok Kei
- Torch lighter: Lee Lai Shan; Wong Kam-po; Cheung King Wai; Hannah Wilson; Chan Hei Man
- Main venue: Hong Kong Cultural Centre (Opening) Hong Kong Coliseum (closing)

2009 East Asian Games
- Traditional Chinese: 2009年東亞運動會
- Simplified Chinese: 2009年东亚运动会
Transcriptions
Standard Mandarin
- Hanyu Pinyin: Èr líng líng jiǔ nián Dōngyà yùndònghuì
Yue: Cantonese
- Jyutping: ji6 ling4 ling4 gau2 nin4 dung1 ngaa3 wan6 dung6 wui2

The 2009 East Asian Games, officially known as the V East Asian Games, was an international multi-sport event that hosted by Hong Kong, between 5 December and 13 December 2009. A total of 2,377 athletes from 9 East Asian national competed in 262 events in 22 sports. It was the biggest sporting event ever held in the territory.

== Organisation ==
=== Bid ===
In 2003 Hong Kong, Chinese Taipei and Mongolia entered the bidding process as potential host cities for the 5th East Asian games. Mongolia subsequently withdrew. On 3 November 2003 at a meeting in Macau, Hong Kong was selected as the host.

June 2004 saw the formation of the Preparatory Committee for the Hong Kong East Asian Games, chaired by Timothy Fok, president of Sports Federation and Olympic Committee of Hong Kong.

=== Costs ===
On 13 January 2006 the Legislative Council had approved the government spending of HK$123 million for the games. The total expenditure for the games is estimated to be HK$240 million. The estimated total revenue is also HK$240 million, including HK$123 million government funding, HK$43 million from ticket and merchandise sales and HK$74 million from cash sponsorship.

=== Venues ===
- Kowloon Park Swimming Pool: Aquatics (Swimming, Diving)
- Tseung Kwan O Sports Ground: Athletics, Bodybuilding, Cycling (Indoor Cycling)
- Queen Elizabeth Stadium: Badminton, Table-tennis
- Hong Kong Coliseum: Basketball, Volleyball
- Western Park Sports Centre: Basketball, Wushu (Taolu, Sanshou)
- Hong Kong International Trade & Exhibition Centre: Bowling, Cue Sports, DanceSport
- Gin Drinker's Bay, Kwai Chung: Cycling (BMX)
- Public Roads in the New Territories: Cycling (Road Cycling)
- Hong Kong Stadium: Football, Rugby Sevens
- Siu Sai Wan Sports Ground: Football
- King's Park Hockey Ground: Hockey
- Shek Kip Mei Park Sports Centre: Judo, Taekwondo
- Shatin Rowing Centre: Rowing
- South China AA Sports Complex: Shooting
- Hong Kong Squash Centre: Squash
- Aberdeen Tennis and Squash Centre: Squash
- Hong Kong Park Sports Centre: Squash
- Victoria Park Tennis Centre: Tennis
- Lai Chi Kok Park Sports Centre: Weightlifting
- Stanley Main Beach Water Sports Centre: Windsurfing

Fireworks emblem

=== Emblem ===
During the 2005 East Asian Games in Macau, a competition was held to determine the logo for the 5th East Asian Games. On 11 July 2005 a fireworks emblem, designed by Clement Yick Tat-wa, was selected. The design makes reference to the five Olympic rings, and the sparkling fireworks symbolise the energy of athletes striving to fulfill their potential and to achieve sporting excellence.

=== Slogan ===
A slogan contest was held at the Asian Games in 2006 and the winning suggestion was "Be the Legend" (Chinese: 創造傳奇一刻; Jyutping: cong3 zou6 cyun4 kei4 jat1 hak1); fitting well with the ideals of athletes reaching their potential and achieving legendary victories. This slogan was submitted by secondary school student Choi Sau-chu (蔡秀珠). The event song is You are the Legend (Chinese: 衝出世界; Jyutping: cung1 ceot1 sai3 gaai3).

=== Mascot ===
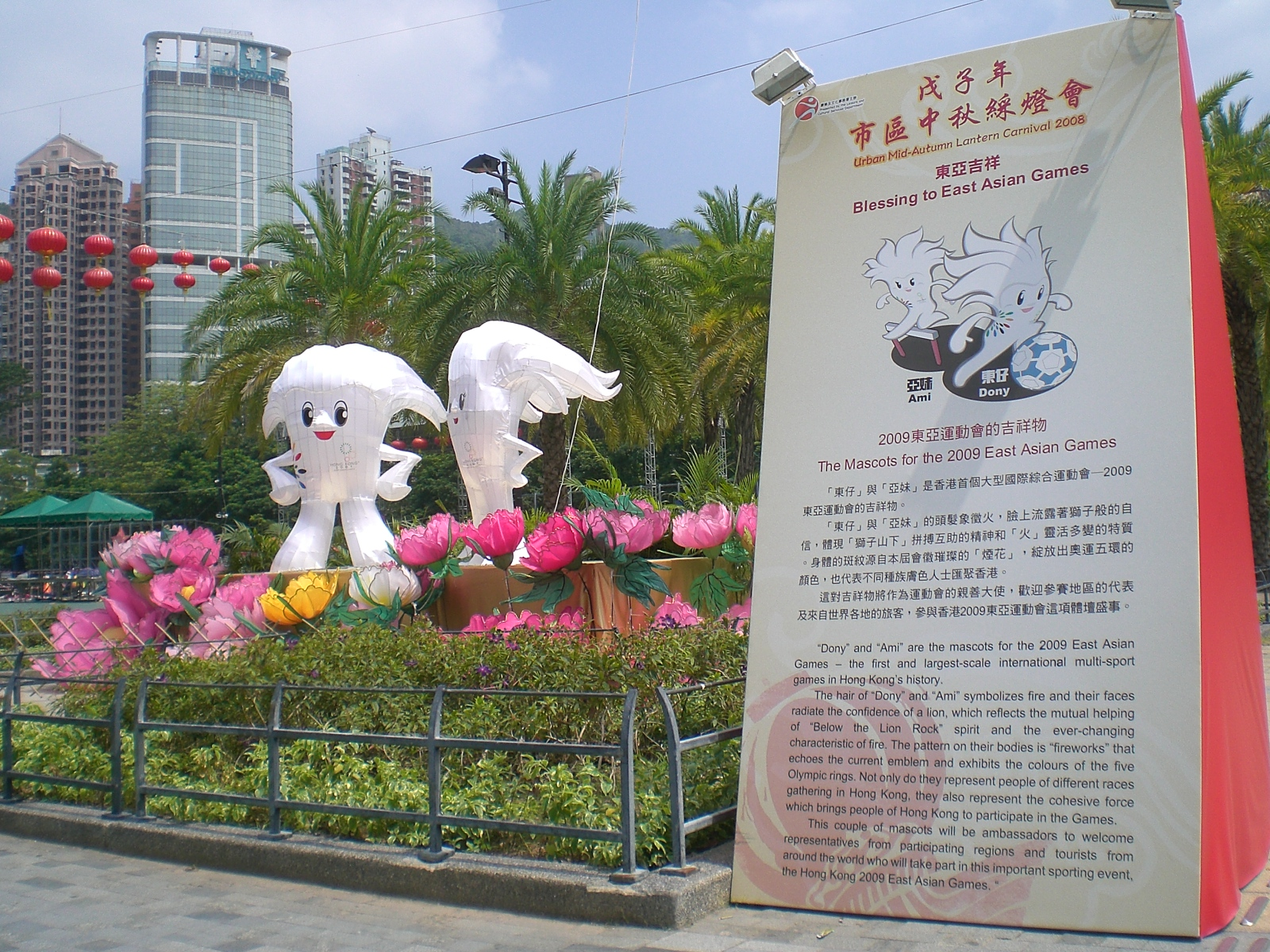
Dony and Ami at Victoria Park

"Dony" (Chinese: 東仔; Jyutping: dung1 zai2) and "Ami" (Chinese: 亞妹; Jyutping: ngaa3 mui6), carrying the motifs of a flaming torch and the Lion Rock, were the mascots of the Games.

=== Stamps ===
A set of "Heartwarming Stamps" were released in March and another set was available in August while commemorative stamps were issued on the opening day of the event, 5 December.

== Countdowns ==
=== One year ===
The 1 year countdown to the 2009 East Asian games began with Hong Kong Chief executive Donald Tsang inaugurating a special countdown clock in Hong Kong Cultural Centre on 5 December 2008. The ceremony was also attended by chairman of the East Asian Games planning committee Timothy Fok and heads of delegations of the nine countries. The countdown clock is based on the Mascot "Dony". The Cantonese version of the theme song You are the Legend was also performed for the first time by 30 Hong Kong singers including Alan Tam. Representatives of the Hong Kong 18 district councils were also present. For the 300-day countdown, 24 athletes were invited to sing the theme song at the Alan Tam Hacken Lee concert.

=== 200 days ===
A flower show was opened to the public on 13 May at Victoria Park. The show lasted 10 days featuring 60,000 pots of themed flower. Around 200 organizations from 20 countries participated in the show. The new Tseung Kwan O Sports Ground was opened on 19 May to celebrate the 200 days count down. A relay race was held between the HK police, HK immigration department, Leisure and Cultural department, HK Fire service, Customs and Exercise department, Hong Kong University of Science and Technology and Sai Kung District sports association. There was a dragon and lion dance performance and a tree planting ceremony. A cheerleading competition was also held.

== Torch relay ==
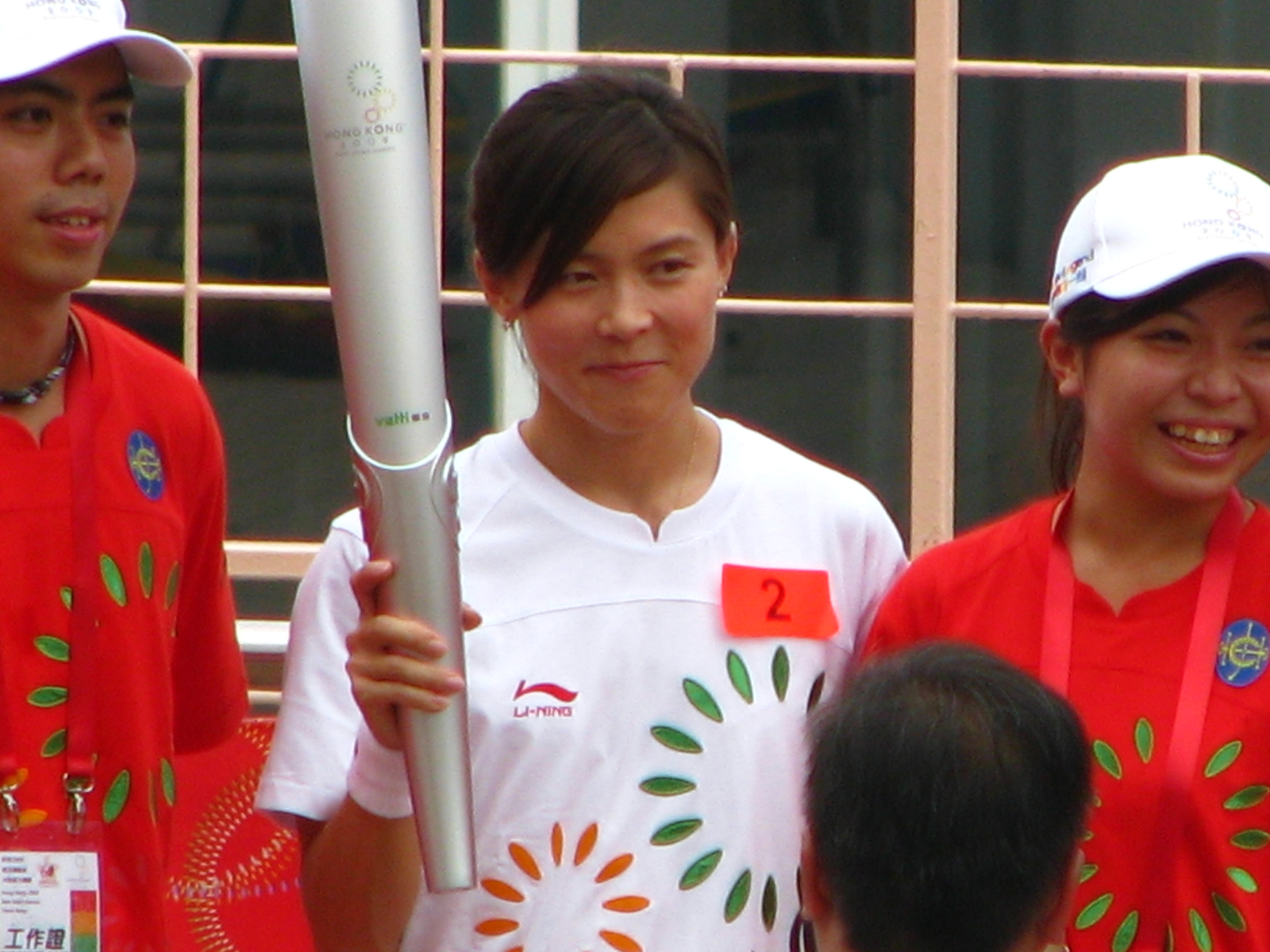
Swimmer Sherry Tsai holds the relay torch

A torch relay was held on August 29 as part of the 100-day Countdown. The relay held the theme "Light the way to the EAG". The torch is a curvy cylinder with a square top and round bottom. It resembles the horn of an ox as 2009 is the year of the Ox. They create the patterns of "Lucky Clouds" to put forward the concept of yin and yang. This also convey the message that Hong Kong is a place where the Chinese and Western cultures meet.

== Calendar ==
In the following calendar for the 2009 East Asian Games, each blue box represents an event competition, such as a qualification round, on that day. The yellow boxes represent days during which medal-awarding finals for a sport were held.

Event competitions	Event finals

December	2	3	4	5	6	7	8	9	10	11	12	13	Gold medals
Ceremonies				●								●	
Athletics									10	11	12	13	46
Badminton									1	1		5	7
Basketball										2			2
Bowling						2	2		4	2	2		12
Cue sports				3	3	2							8
Cycling				2	2	3			2		1		10
Dancesport					12								12
Diving										3	3	4	10
Football											1		1
Hockey											1	1	2
Judo											10	8	18
Rowing										6	7		13
Rugby sevens					2								2
Shooting				1	1	1	1						4
Squash					2			2			3		7
Swimming					8	8	8	8	8				40
Table-tennis					2	5							7
Taekwondo					4	6	6						16
Tennis								1	4				5
Volleyball								2					2
Weightlifting						3	3	3	3	3			15
Windsurfing											4		4
Wushu										2	6	11	19
Total	0	0	0	6	36	30	20	16	32	30	50	42	262

== Games ==
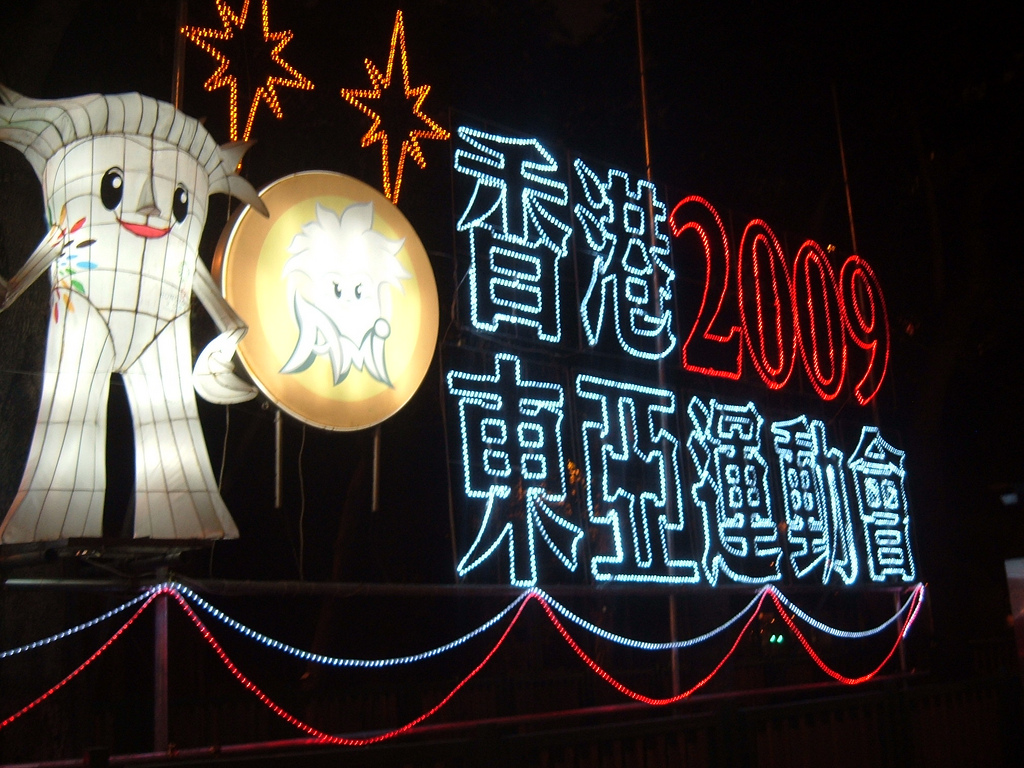
Sign to the 09 East Asian games

=== Opening ceremony ===
State Councilor Liu Yandong graced the official opening ceremony on December 5, which featured an extensive firework display and a large scale music and dance performance at Hong Kong Cultural Centre section of Victoria Harbour. IOC President Jacques Rogge and some IOC members also attended the ceremony. Donald Tsang, Chief Executive of Hong Kong, in his speech said in part: "Through sport, we will celebrate the cultural diversity, friendship and indomitable spirit of our region. Hong Kong extends the hand of friendship to all our guests and visitors." Following this, the torch was brought into Victoria Harbour and the cauldron was lit, signalling the climax of the opening ceremony.

=== Sports ===
2009 East Asian Games featured 262 events in 22 sports (including 16 Olympics sports), a new record of East Asian Games history.

- Aquatics (50)
  - Swimming (40)
  - Diving (10)
- Athletics (46)
- Badminton (7)
- Basketball (2)
- Bowling (12) †
- Cue sports (8) †
- Cycling (10)
  - Road Cycling (3)
  - BMX (2)
  - Indoor Cycling (5)
- DanceSport (12) †
- Football (1)
- Hockey (2)
- Judo (18)
- Rowing (13)
- Rugby sevens (2) †
- Shooting (4)
- Squash (7) †
- Table tennis (7)
- Taekwondo (16)
- Tennis (5)
- Volleyball (2)
- Weightlifting (15)
- Windsurfing (4)
- Wushu (19) †
  - Taolu (12)
  - Sanshou (7)

NB: † = Non-Olympic sports

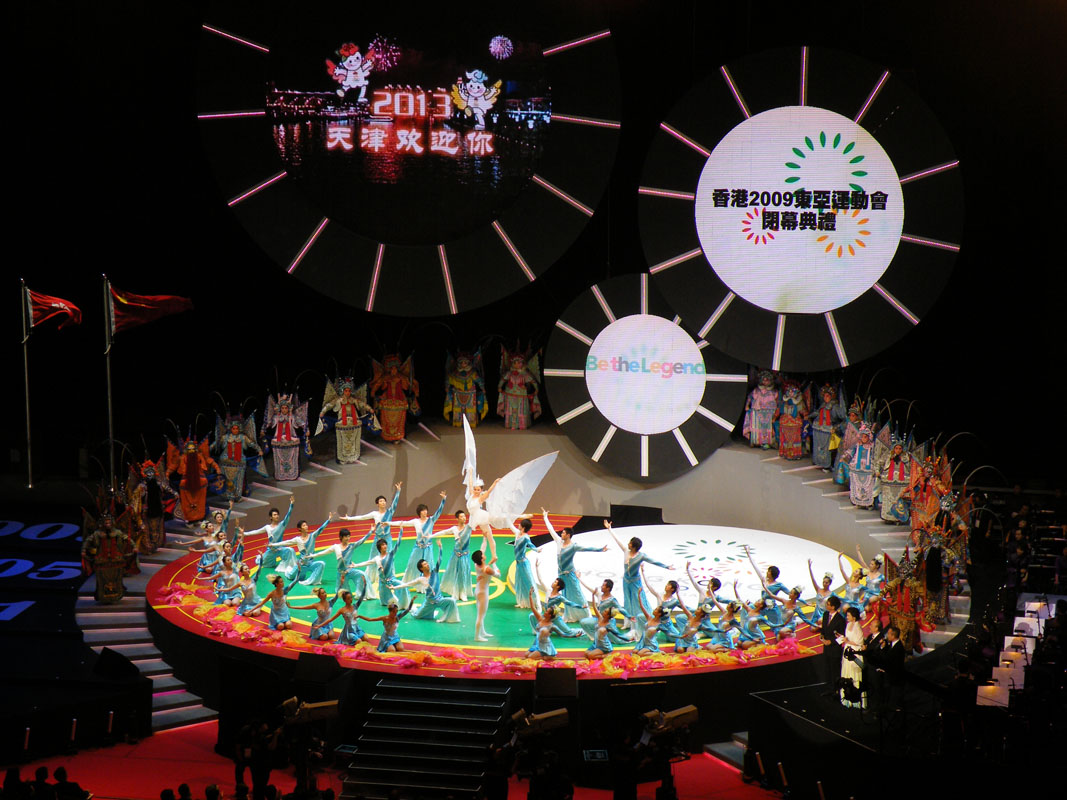
Live performance art dancers

=== Closing ceremony ===
The closing ceremony took place on 13 December at Kowloon Hong Kong Coliseum. After the country entrances, the event featured a host of performance art section on stage and the transfer of the East Asian Games flag to the host of the next host Tianjin. Three sections including Color, Flower and Ocean were on display along with a host of international popstars.

=== Medal table ===
A total of 262 gold medals are presented in East Asian Games. The following table shows the Final Medal Tally of regions:

* Host nation (Hong Kong)

Rank	Nation	Gold	Silver	Bronze	Total
1	China (CHN)	113	73	46	232
2	Japan (JPN)	62	58	70	190
3	South Korea (KOR)	39	45	59	143
4	Hong Kong (HKG)*	26	31	53	110
5	Chinese Taipei (TPE)	8	34	47	89
6	Macau (MAC)	8	9	12	29
7	North Korea (PRK)	6	8	11	25
8	Mongolia (MGL)	0	4	16	20
9	Guam (GUM)	0	0	1	1
Totals (9 entries)		262	262	315	839

== Participation ==
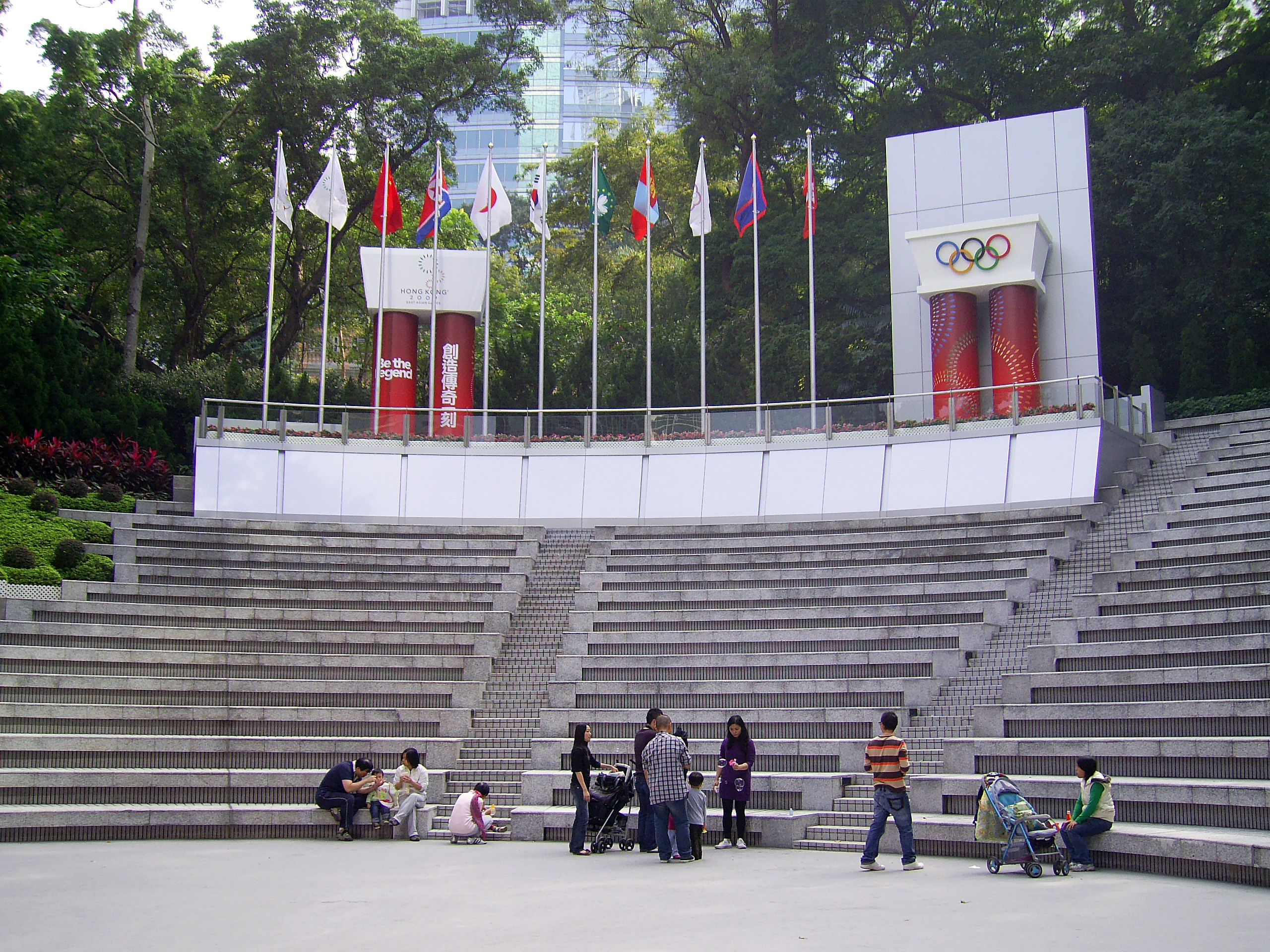
Flags of nine countries and EAG in Hong Kong Park Olympic Square

All of the 9 East Asian Games Association (EAGA) that existed as of 2009 participated in the 2009 East Asian Games. China had the largest team, with 474 athletes.

- China (474)
- Chinese Taipei (250)
- Guam (107)

- Hong Kong (438)
- Japan (427)
- North Korea (76)

- South Korea (325)
- Macau (179)
- Mongolia (97)
