= Golf club (establishment) =

Type of sports club

Golf clubs, in the context of establishments, refer to venues that encompass golf courses and often additional facilities such as clubhouses, dining areas, pro shops, and golf practice ranges. These clubs can range from public access courses, where anyone can play for a fee, to private clubs with restricted membership and exclusive access.

== History ==
The concept of golf clubs dates back to the 15th century in Scotland, with the establishment of the Old Course at St. Andrews in 1552 being one of the earliest known instances. The formal organization of golf clubs began in the 18th century, with The Royal Burgess Golfing Society which holds claim to being the oldest golf society in the world. Additionally, the Honourable Company of Edinburgh Golfers, founded in 1744, is also often cited as the oldest golf club. Initially, these clubs were exclusive gatherings of the elite, but over time, they evolved to cater to a broader segment of society.

=== Role in golf development ===
Golf clubs play a crucial role in the social and professional development of the sport by providing venues for competition, fostering talent through access to high-quality coaching and junior programs, and contributing to the game's governance through adherence to rules and handicapping systems.

== Types of clubs and memberships ==
Golf clubs are primarily categorized into private, semi-private, and public clubs.

- Private Golf Clubs often require an invitation for membership and often have initiation fees and dues. Access to the course and club facilities is restricted to members and their guests.
- Semi-Private Golf Clubs offer memberships and also allow non-members to play for a fee ("greenfee"), providing a blend of exclusivity and public access.
- Public Golf Clubs are open to anyone who pays the green fee, making them the most accessible type of golf club.

=== Membership models ===
Membership models vary widely among golf clubs, from equity memberships where members own a share of the club, to non-equity models where members pay fees for access without owning a stake. Some clubs offer lifetime memberships, while others operate on an annual renewal basis. Additional categories, such as junior, senior, and corporate memberships, cater to specific demographics.

=== Facilities and services ===
Beyond the golf course, clubs may offer a range of facilities and services, including:

- Clubhouses: Serving as the hub for social and administrative activities, featuring dining areas, locker rooms, and meeting spaces.
- Pro Shops: Retail outlets offering golf equipment, apparel, and accessories.
- Practice Ranges: Areas designated for practicing shots, which may include driving ranges, putting greens, and chipping areas.
- Instructors: Professional instruction and coaching for members to improve their game.

==== Events and tournaments ====
Many golf clubs host tournaments and other golfing events. These can range from casual social events to highly competitive tournaments. Some clubs have resident professionals who provide instruction and organize club tournaments.
