= GolfTEC =

American golf supply and service company

- Founded: 1995
- Founder: Joe Assell, Mike Clinton, Clayton Cole
- Headquarters: Denver, Colorado
- Website: golftec.com

GOLFTEC is a golf instruction and club fitting company headquartered in Denver, Colorado. The company was founded in 1995 by Joe Assell, Mike Clinton, and Clayton Cole.

The company has more than 200 retail locations worldwide, including the United States, Canada, China, Japan, Singapore, and Hong Kong.

== History and overview ==
In 1995, the company opened its first location in Denver under the name Driving Obsession. Two years later, it was re-branded as GOLFTEC (Technique, Equipment, Conditioning) and added two new locations in the Chicago area. In 2016, GOLFTEC, one of the top employers of PGA of America Professionals, formed a strategic partnership with the PGA.

Currently, GOLFTEC offers clubs from Callaway Golf, Mizuno, PING, TaylorMade Golf and Titleist.

== Partnership with Golf Digest Online ==
In May 2018, Golf Digest Online (GDO), a golf conglomerate in Japan, expanded its partnership with GOLFTEC.

The agreement centered on GDO's US entity, GDO Sports, Inc. acquiring majority interest in GOLFTEC with plans to merge the strengths of both companies.

GDO previously held a minority stake in GOLFTEC and has operated 10 franchised training centers in Japan since opening its first in the upscale Roppongi district of Tokyo in 2012.
