= You Are the Legend =

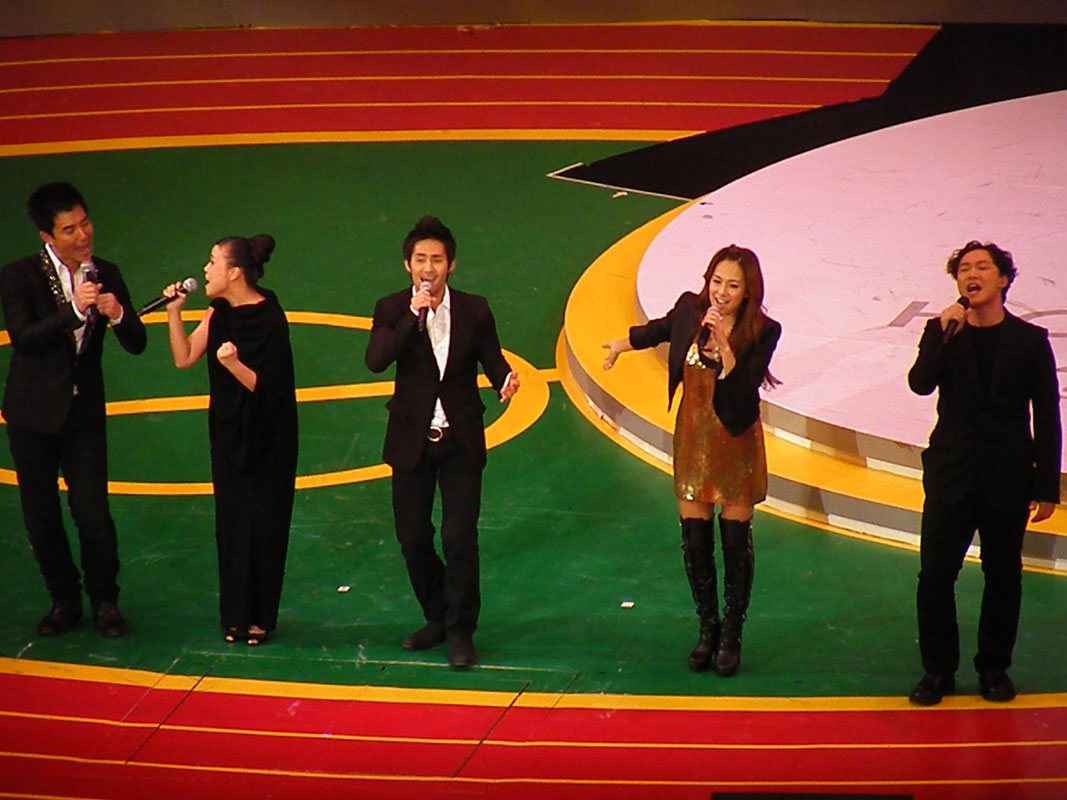
Richie Jen, Dadawa, Kousuke Atari, Chae Yeon and Eason Chan at the 2009 East Asian Games closing ceremony

You Are the Legend [sic] (衝出世界) is the official theme song of the 2009 East Asian Games held in Hong Kong. The song was composed by Peter Kam (金培達) and Keith Chan (陳少琪).

== Cantonese version ==
This version was performed by over 60 public figures.

=== Singers and celebrities ===
- Jacky Cheung
- Alan Tam
- Natalis Chan
- Hacken Lee
- Eason Chan
- Miriam Yeung
- Leo Ku
- Joey Yung
- Gigi Leung
- Charlene Choi
- Andy Hui
- Hins Cheung
- Vincy Chan
- Justin Lo
- Maria Cordero
- Alex Fong
- Deep Ng
- William Chan
- Chau Pak-ho
- Fiona Sit
- Pong Nan (藍奕邦)
- Wilfred Lau
- Jason Chan
- Sherman Chung
- Ella Koon
- Stephanie Cheng
- Philip Wei (韋雄)
- Elanne Kong
- Jade Kwan
- Niki Chow
- Kelvin Kwan
- Tinyee Wong (黃天頤)
- EO2
- Soler
- FAMA
- JJ Jia (賈曉晨)
- Wada Hiromi (裕美)
- Percy Fan (范萱蔚)
- Vangie Tang
- Ivan Wang (王友良)
- Takki Wong (王若琪)
- Terence Siufay (小肥)
- Fiona Fung (馮曦妤)
- Jamie Fong (方珈悠)
- Cherry Wong (黃鎧晴)
- Tat Dik (狄易達)
- Hotcha
- Alyson Hau (侯嘉明)
- G.E.M
- A-dAY
- Fung Gaa-yeon (馮家俊)
- Angel Ho (何卓瑩)
- Ava Yu (羽翹)
- Colleen Lau (可嵐)
- Freeze
- ToNick
- Square
- Albert Chow (周吉佩)
- Cheung Yi-ching (張苡澂)
- Bianca Wu (胡琳)
- Alex Hung (扈佳榮)
- Terry Chui (徐浩)
- Alex Lee (李志剛)

=== Athletes ===
- Wang Chen
- Yip Pui-yin
- Wu Siu-hong (胡兆康)
- Sherry Tsai (蔡曉慧)
- Stephanie Au (歐鎧淳)
- Elaine Chan (陳宇寧)
- Chan Yun-to

== International version ==
A multi-language "international version" was performed by Dadawa (China), Eason Chan (Hong Kong), Kousuke Atari (Japan), Chae Yeon (South Korea) and Richie Jen (Taiwan).
