= Driving range =

Golf practice facility

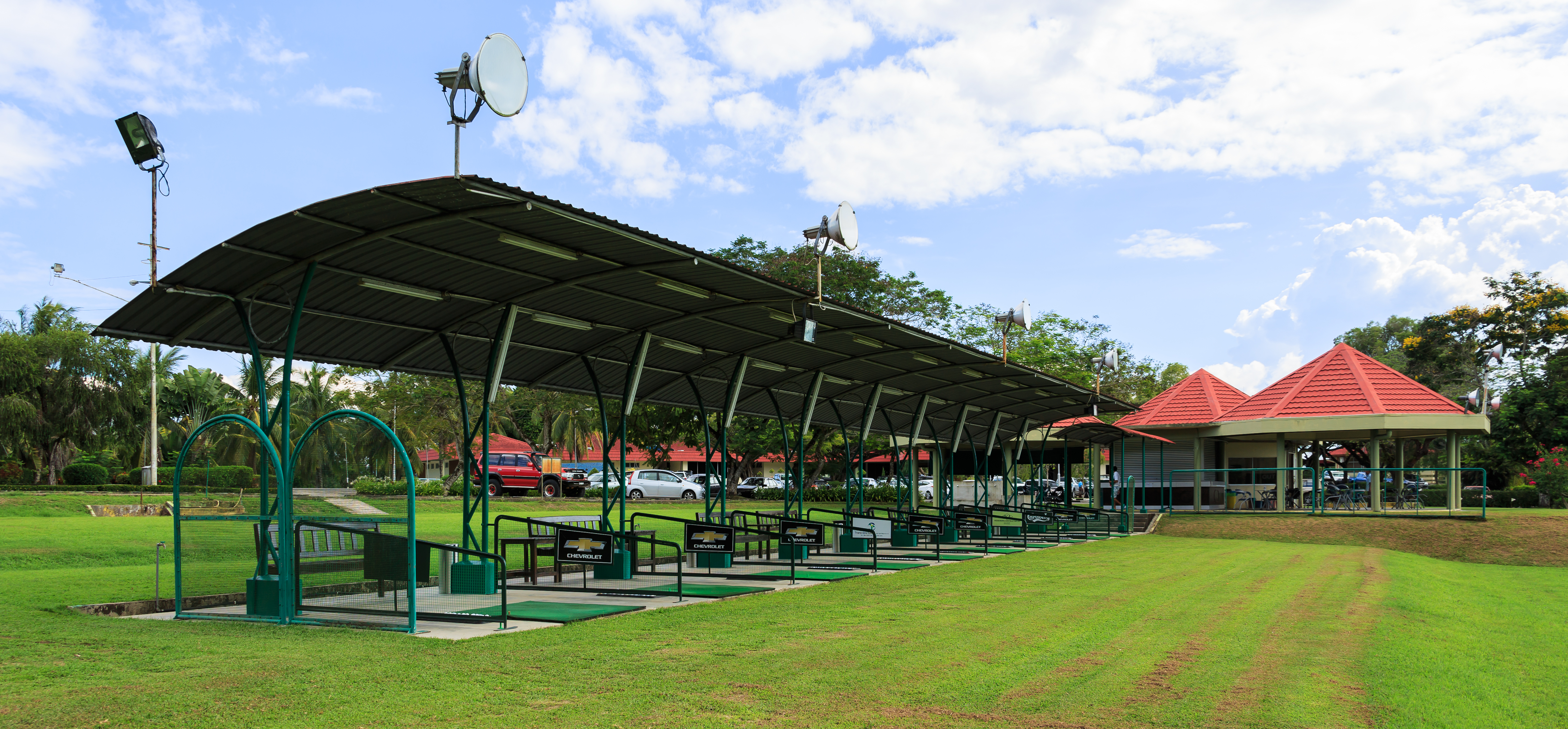
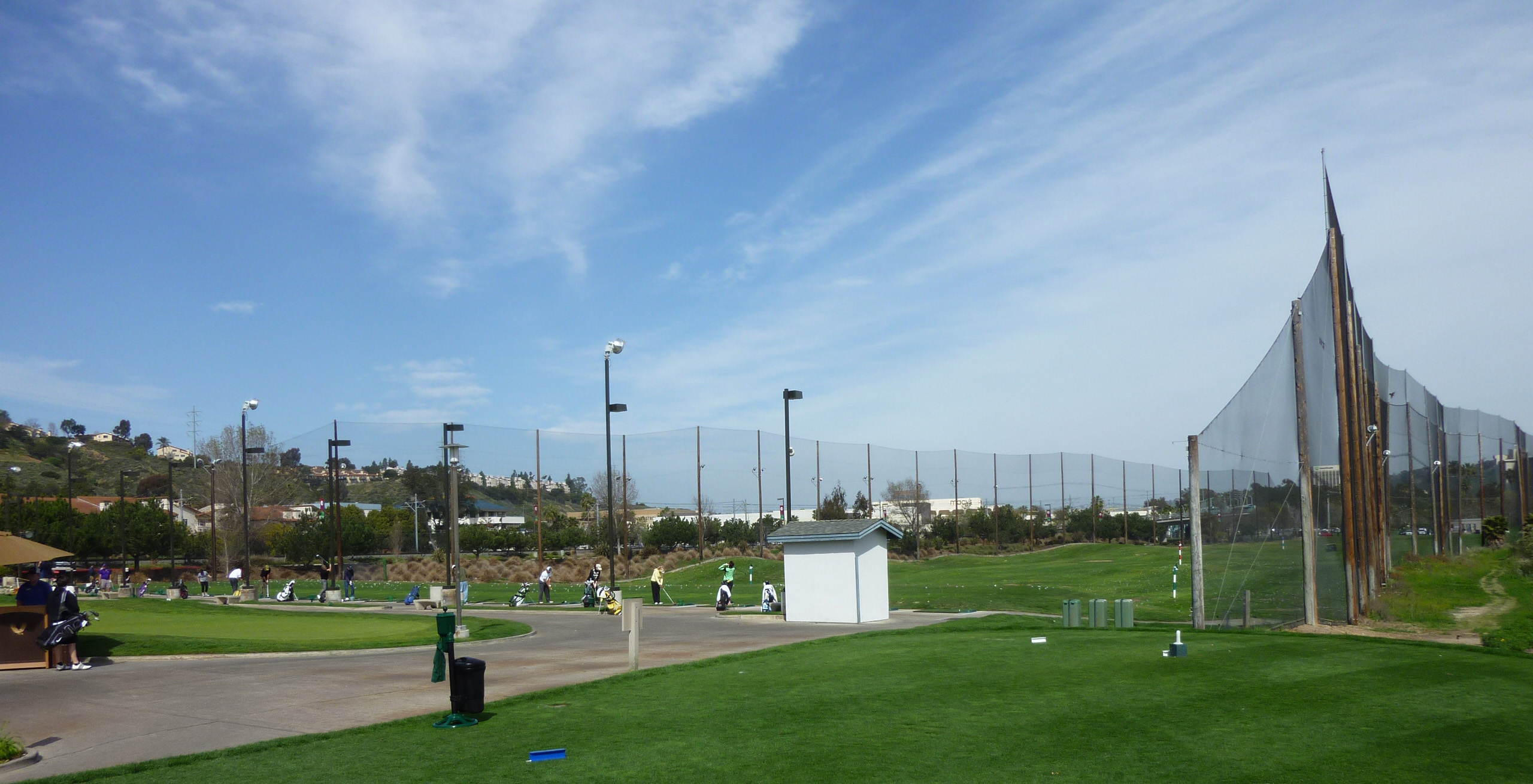
Outdoor driving ranges at two golf clubs.

A driving (also called a practice, golf, hitting or, informally, a shooting range) is a facility or area where golfers can practice golf shots outside the context of a round of golf. Driving ranges typically consist of multiple hitting stations from which players strike golf balls toward designated target areas.

They are used for practicing full swings, warming up before play, receiving instruction, and testing golf equipment. Ranges vary in size and design, from open-air facilities attached to golf courses to standalone commercial venues and indoor simulators. Ranges may allow hitting off natural grass, or allow players to use artificial turf mats.

== History ==
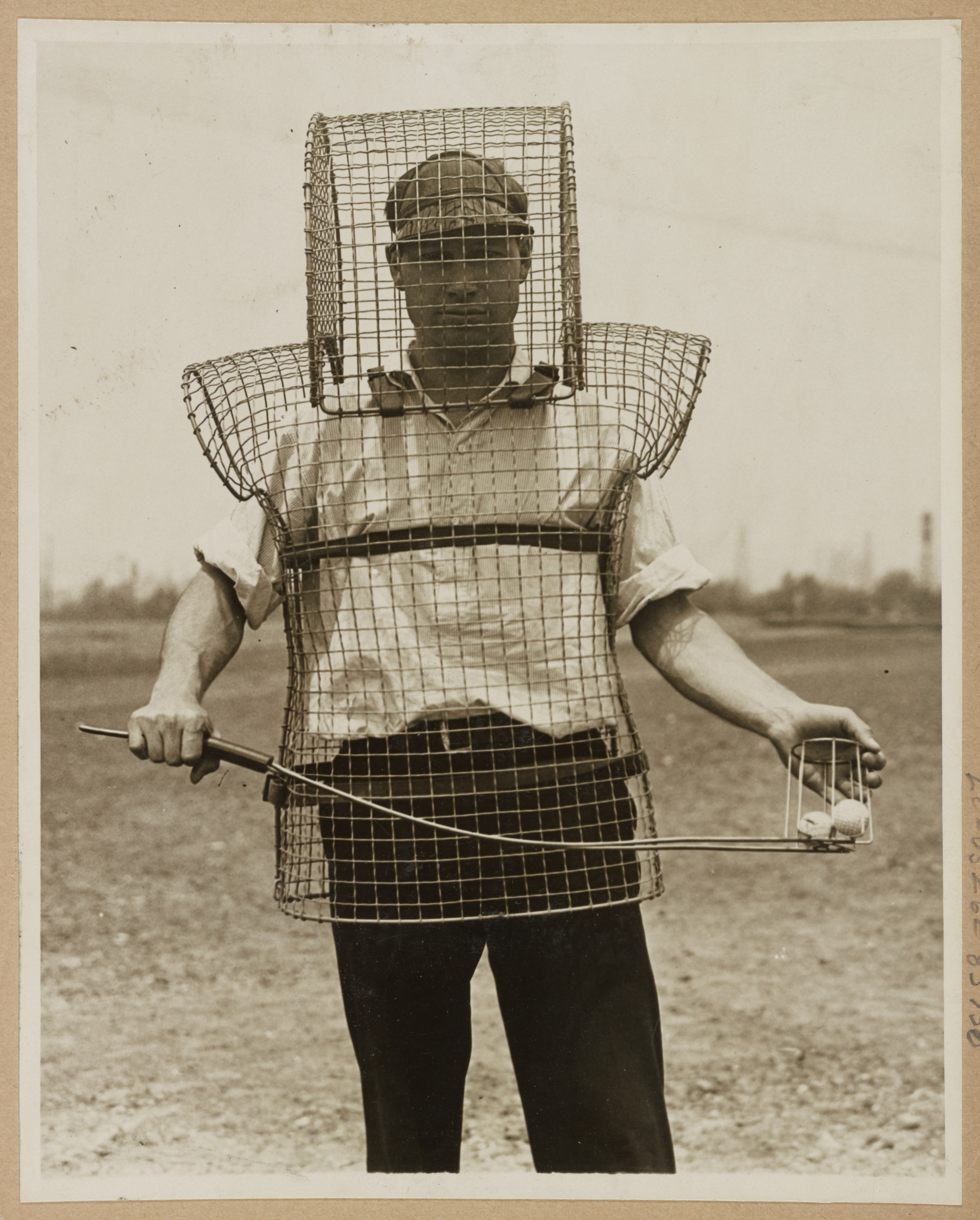
A caddie wearing a wire-mesh suit designed to protect those shagging golf balls. (1920)

Following the introduction of golf to the United States in 1878, the sport expanded throughout the country. Early practice areas were often informal parts of golf courses where players could practice shots separately from regular play.

During the 19th century, many golf clubs and courses in Scotland and elsewhere in the United Kingdom had only small areas set aside for retrieving and practicing with golf balls. In Scotland, golfers commonly received instruction directly from a professional golfer on the course or practiced on unused fairways, a traditional method later described by Bobby Jones in his 1927 autobiography, Down the Fairway, in reference to instruction he received from his mentor, Stewart Maiden.

In 1913, golf course architect Donald Ross converted three holes of the No. 1 course at Pinehurst Resort into a dedicated practice area known as "Maniac Hill," which has been described as one of the earliest purpose-built golf practice ranges. The area was used by professionals during the North and South Open in the 1940s. Professional golfer Tommy Armour later compared its significance to golf as “what Kitty Hawk was to flying.”

According to Merriam-Webster and Oxford English Dictionary, the first written use of the English word driving range, meaning a practice course, dates back only to 1929. As golf participation increased in the United States during the mid-20th century, driving ranges became more common at public and private golf clubs. The first driving range is thought to have opened in 1915 in New York City. The first public golf course in the United States opened in 1895 at Van Cortlandt Golf Course in The Bronx. During the 20th century, driving ranges became recreational venues for the middle class, who, in the 1950s, primarily used for practicing golf shots outside of regular rounds. Today, most golfers use them to practice full swings, short shots, distance control, and consistency. Some commercial driving ranges, such as Topgolf, offer golf-based driving range games with food, beverages, and entertainment.

== Indoor golf ==
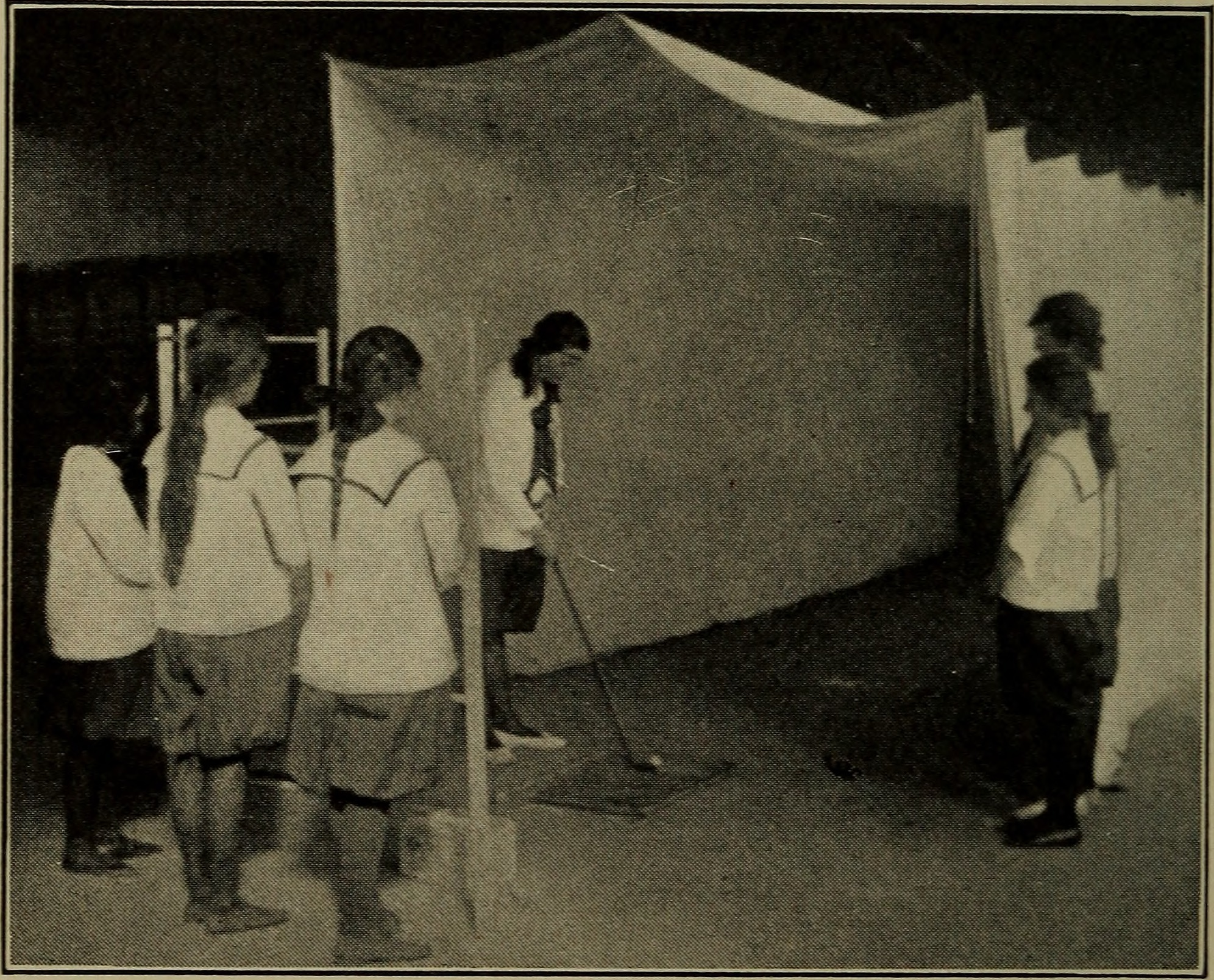
Photograph of an enclosed golf practice cage from New Rational Athletics for Boys and Girls (1917)

Over time, many driving ranges expanded beyond basic practice areas by offering services such as instruction, club fitting, and equipment repair. In the 21st century, some facilities have incorporated technologies such as launch monitors, ball-tracking systems, and golf simulators. Virtual golf facilities have also been established in commercial spaces, where players can hit from an artificial-turf teeing area toward a projection screen. Sensors and cameras measure data such as ball speed, spin, launch angle, and club path to calculate and display the simulated flight of the ball.

=== Indoor driving range ===
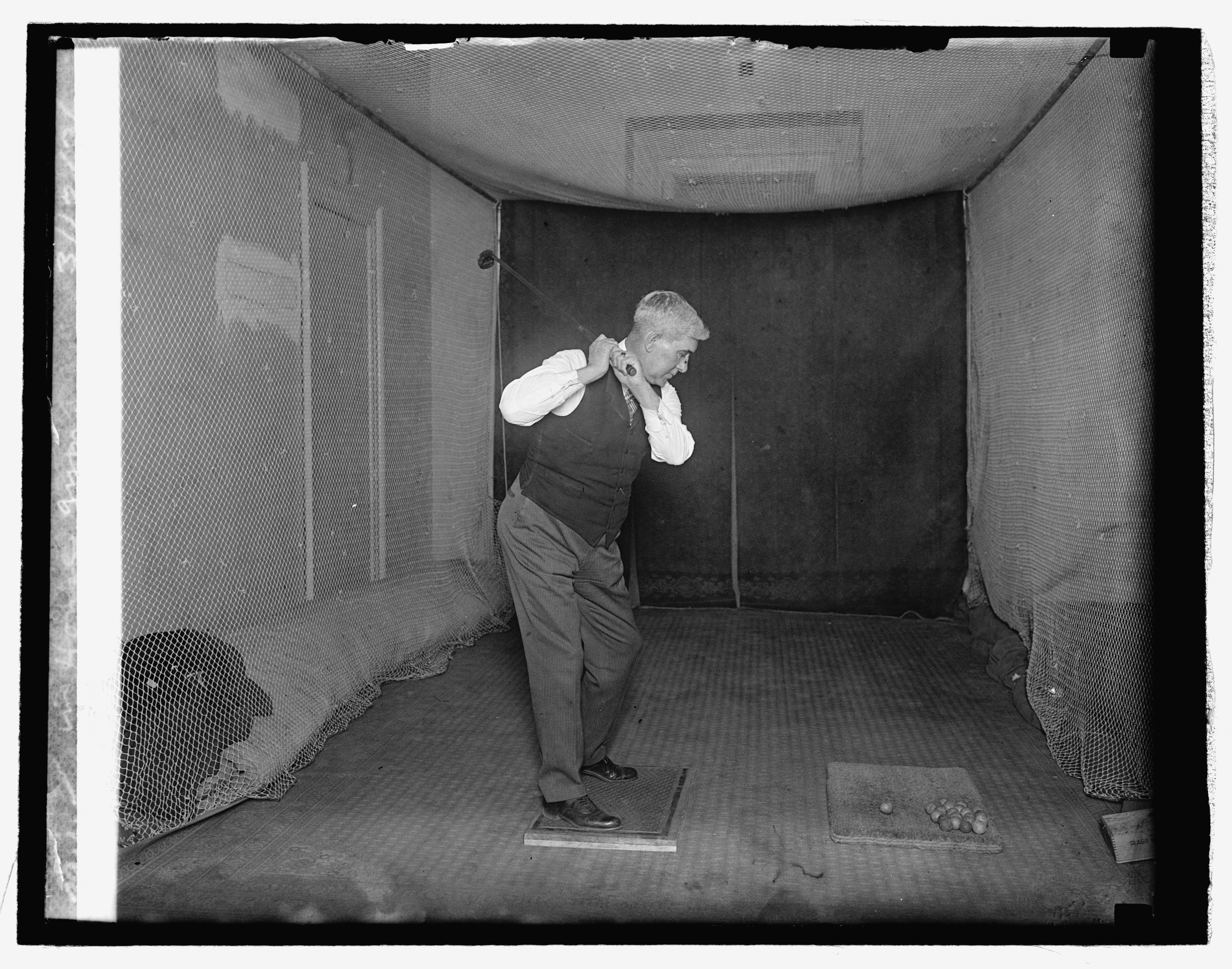
Albert Henry Vestal in an indoor golf driving range. (1926)

An indoor driving range can be a low-ceiling structure in which players hit golfballs into a net at close range, or a large high-ceiling dome, where players are better able to observe the trajectory of the golfball in flight. Teaching professionals and computer/video evaluation tools may also be available at these ranges, as well as specialized areas for putting, chipping, and sand shots.

== Design and layout ==
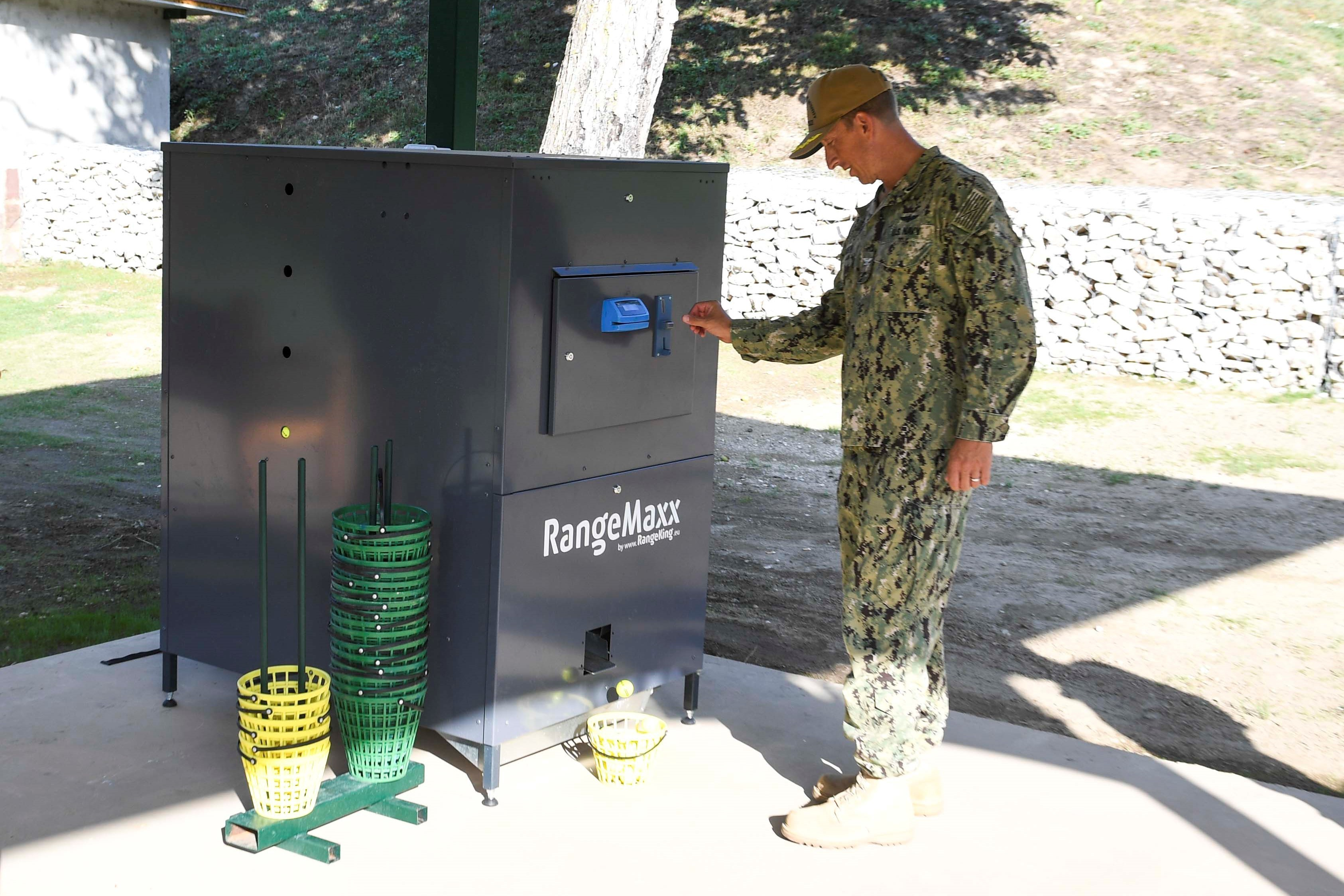
An automated range ball dispenser at a golf driving range. This dispenser typically accepts coins, a code, or golf-specific tokens. Balls are collected using a metal or plastic bucket.

Driving ranges generally consist of a teeing area where golfers can hit balls into a field containing targets or distance markers. Depending on location, the teeing area may use natural grass, artificial turf, or hitting mats. There are also driving ranges where you hit the balls into a lake.

Driving ranges are typically divided into individual hitting stations, each marked and spaced to provide adequate room for golfers. Some facilities separate stations with metal or wooden barriers to improve safety and reduce interference between players. Protective netting or other barriers are commonly installed to help contain golf balls within the practice area.

Practice fields commonly include target greens, flags, distance markers, and other things that allow golfers to evaluate their shot distance. Some facilities may also include multiple hitting stations, covered areas, lighting systems, multi-level hitting stalls, indoor facilities, and automated ball-collection equipment.

== Operation ==
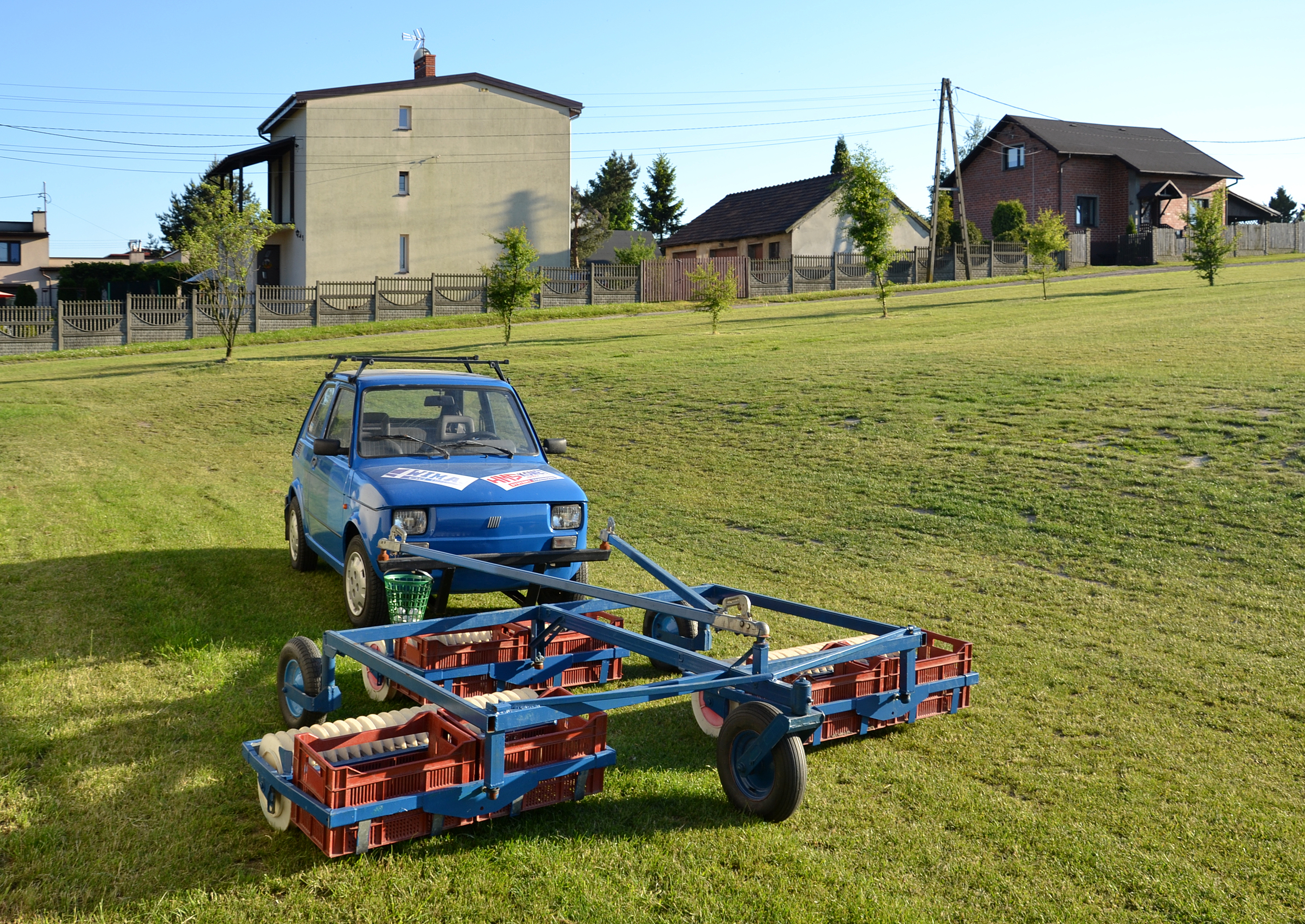
Balls are retrieved by a specialty cart with a brush and roller attachment that automatically picks up balls and a cage that protects the driver from incoming balls

Diving ranges may operate as part of a golf course, as standalone businesses, or as public and private practice facilities. Golfers typically pay for buckets of range balls or use electronic systems that dispense balls automatically. Golfers pay for various sizes of buckets of balls and hit at their leisure. Some ranges feature electronic tee devices, which load balls automatically and record ball use on a smart card. Most provide golfers with access to practice areas through the use of rented buckets of balls, ball-dispensing systems, or other methods of distributing range balls.

To prevent injuries, entering the green area, for example, to collect balls, is always prohibited by the operator. Taking or playing with range balls on the golf course is forbidden and, in addition to the usual legal consequences for theft, will result in a ban from the course.

Facilities commonly maintain the practice area by collecting golf balls, repairing hitting surfaces, and managing equipment such as ball-collecting machines. Many commercial driving ranges are seen in conjunction with other sports-related practice areas such as batting cages or miniature golf. Some driving ranges also offer areas for practice chip shots, bunker shots, and putting.

In urban and suburban areas, large nets protect surrounding people and structures from errant balls. Driving ranges are particularly popular in Japan, where golf courses are overcrowded and often very expensive.

== Technology ==
Modern driving ranges increasingly use technology to provide feedback and analysis. Launch monitors (such as TrackMan), ball-tracking systems, and high-speed cameras can measure information such as ball speed, launch angle, distance, and shot direction.

=== Range ball ===
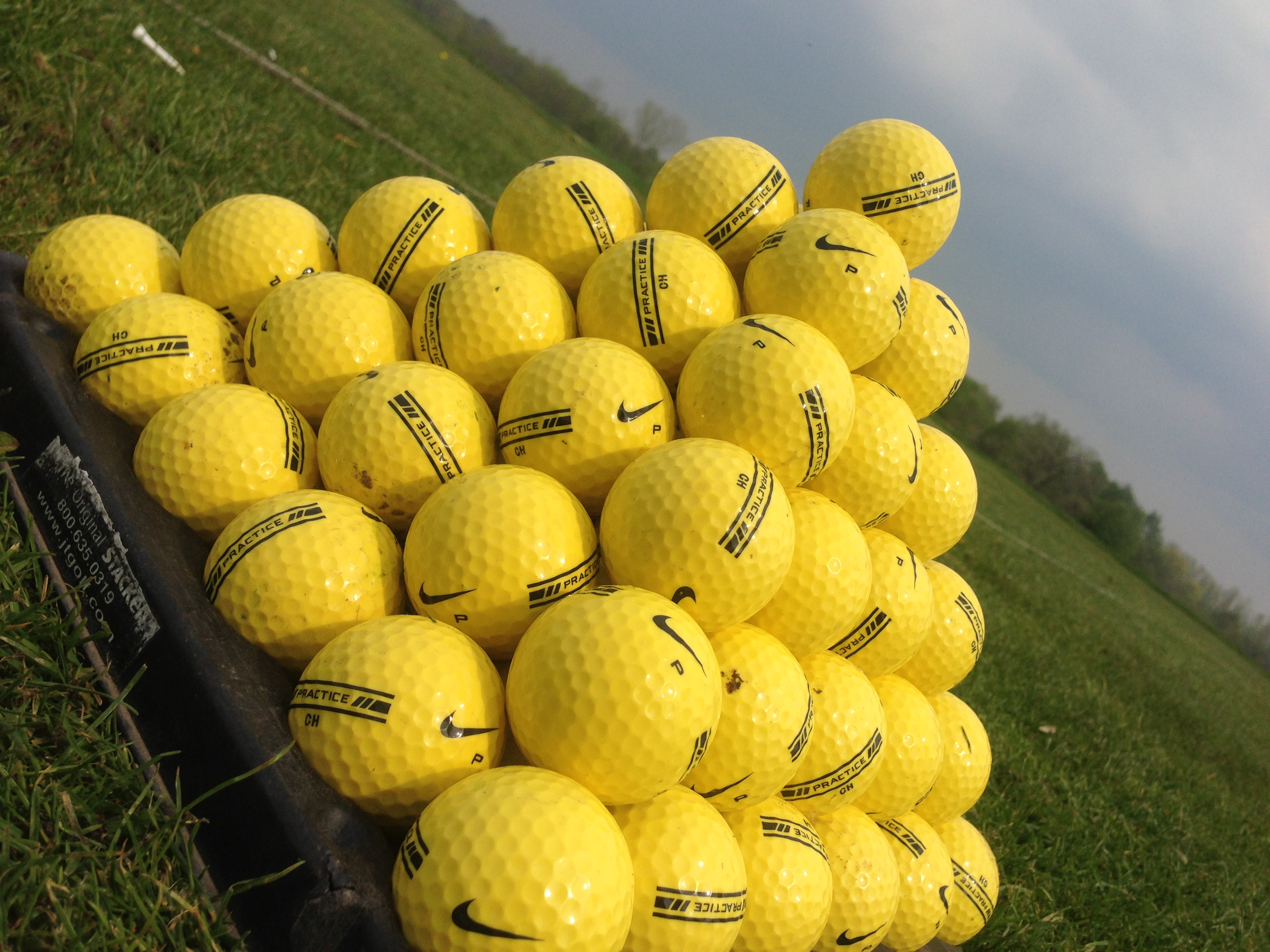
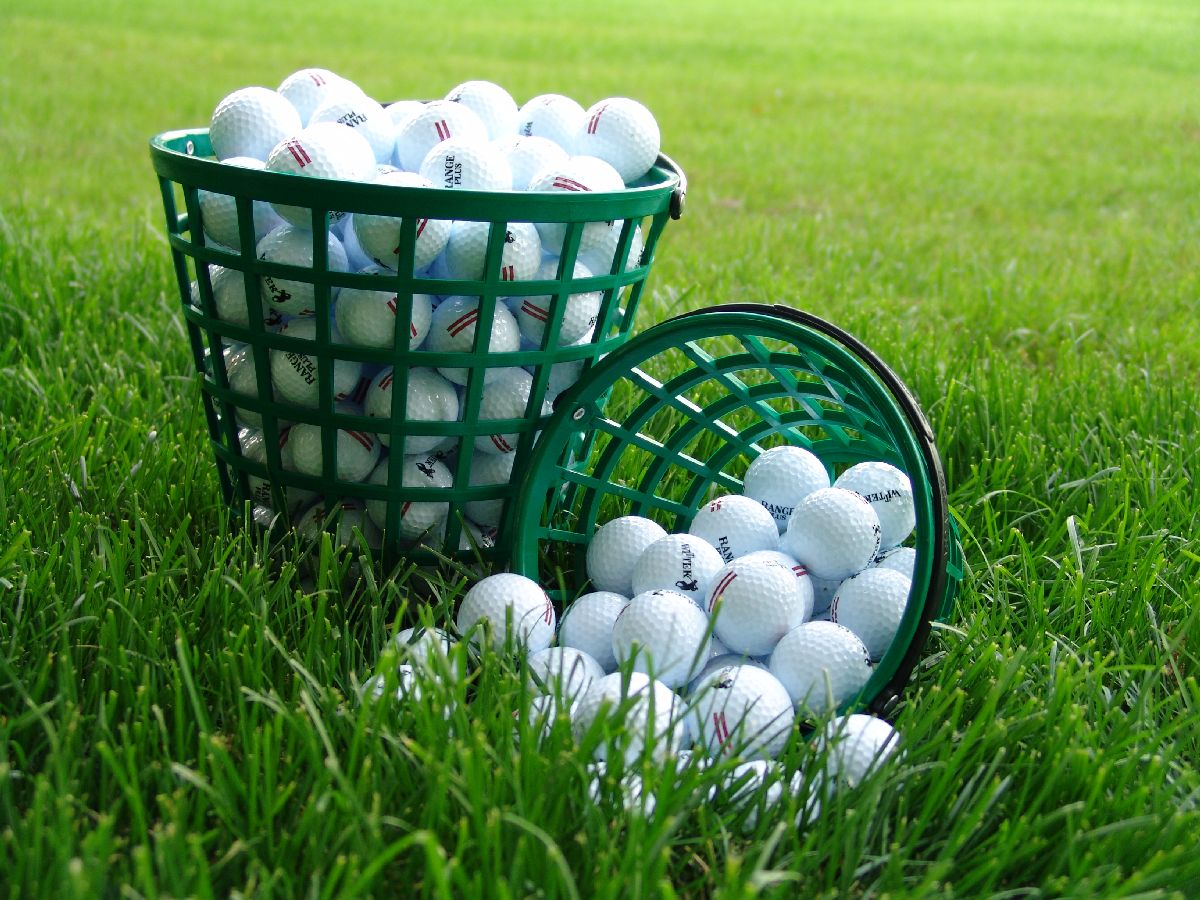
Golf balls at a driving range

Driving ranges commonly use specially designed range balls that are more durable and built to withstand extensive use. These balls often have harder cores and tougher covers than standard golf balls. As such, they also may not necessarily conform to the rules of golf. While some are marked “PRACTICE” and are not necessarily legal under USGA Rule 4.2, most range balls are limited-flight or heavily worn and won’t behave like regular balls. They’re easy to identify due to their distinctive coloring or the word “range” stamped on them.

If a tournament or club committee adopts a Local Rule requiring players to use balls from the "List of Conforming Golf Balls," X-Out balls are not permitted. Practice balls may still be used, provided they conform to the rules of golf.

== See also ==
- Shooting range – Specialized facility designed for firearms practice
- Bowling – Class of sports in which a player rolls a ball towards a target
- Miniature golf – Offshoot of golf focusing solely on the putting aspect
- Long drive – Golf sport
- Golfsmith – Defunct American corporation
