= Weightlifting at the 2009 East Asian Games =

- Venue: Lai Chi Kok Park Sports Centre
- Location: Hong Kong
- Dates: 7–11 December 2009
- Competitors: 63 from 8 nations

The weightlifting competitions at the 2009 East Asian Games took place at the Lai Chi Kok Park Sports Centre in Hong Kong from 7 to 11 December 2009. The game featured 15 events, 8 men and 7 women events.

== Participating nations ==
A total of 63 competitors from 8 nations participated.

- China (13)
- Chinese Taipei (10)
- Hong Kong (3) (host)
- Japan (10)
- North Korea (10)
- South Korea (10)
- Macau (3)
- Mongolia (4)

== Medal table ==
* Host nation (Hong Kong)

Rank	Nation	Gold	Silver	Bronze	Total
1	China (CHN)	8	4	1	13
2	North Korea (PRK)	4	1	4	9
3	South Korea (KOR)	2	4	1	7
4	Macau (MAC)	1	1	0	2
5	Chinese Taipei (TPE)	0	4	4	8
6	Japan (JPN)	0	1	3	4
7	Hong Kong (HKG)*	0	0	1	1
7	Mongolia (MGL)	0	0	1	1
Totals (8 entries)		15	15	15	45

== Medalists ==
=== Men ===
Event	Gold		Silver		Bronze	
56 kg	Long Qingquan; China	280	Yang Chin-yi; Chinese Taipei	240	Munkhdul Enkhjargal; Mongolia	215
62 kg	Kim Un-guk; North Korea	310	Yang Sheng-hsiung; Chinese Taipei	296	Cha Kum-chol; North Korea	295
69 kg	Kim Kum-sok; North Korea	321	Tang Deshang; China	320	Wu Tsung-ling; Chinese Taipei	288
77 kg	Kim Kwang-hoon; South Korea	352	Liao Hui; China	351	Pang Kum-chol; North Korea	331
85 kg	Lu Yong; China	370	Cheon Jeong-pyung; South Korea	333	Yuji Yoshioka; Japan	320
94 kg	Jiang Hairong; China	374	Kim Min-jae; South Korea	374	Yuki Hiraoki; Japan	330
105 kg	Yang Zhe; China	390	Kim Wha-sung; South Korea	370	Hsieh Wei-chun; Chinese Taipei	346
+105 kg	An Yong-kwon; South Korea	405	Kazuomi Ota; Japan	382	Chen Shih-chieh; Chinese Taipei	371

=== Women ===
Event	Gold		Silver		Bronze	
48 kg	Yang Lian; China	202	Chen Wei-ling; Chinese Taipei	192	Ryang Chun-hwa; North Korea	192
53 kg	Li Ping; China	215	Paek Un-hui; North Korea	201	Yu Weili; Hong Kong	199
58 kg	Jong Chun-mi; North Korea	232	Li Xueying; China	231	O Jong-ae; North Korea	221
63 kg	Pak Hyon-suk; North Korea	247	Liu Xia; Macau	221	Guo Xiyan; China	220
69 kg	Zhang Shaoling; Macau	243	Liu Chunhong; China	231	Lu Ying-chi; Chinese Taipei	200
75 kg	Cao Lei; China	252	Wang Ya-jhen; Chinese Taipei	226	Lee Ae-ra; South Korea	220
+75 kg	Qi Xihui; China	275	Lee Hui-sol; South Korea	256	Mami Shimamoto; Japan	253

== Results ==
=== Men's results ===
==== 56 kg ====
Rank	Athlete	Nation	Snatch (kg)				Clean & Jerk (kg)				Total
Rank	Athlete	Nation	1	2	3	Result	1	2	3	Result	Total
1st place, gold medalist(s)	Long Qingquan	China	116	120	125	125	140	150	155	155	280
2nd place, silver medalist(s)	Yang Chin-yi	Chinese Taipei	105	~~115~~	~~115~~	105	135	—	—	135	240
3rd place, bronze medalist(s)	Munkhdul Enkhjargal	Mongolia	~~95~~	~~95~~	95	95	115	120	~~122~~	120	215

==== 62 kg ====
Rank	Athlete	Nation	Snatch (kg)				Clean & Jerk (kg)				Total
Rank	Athlete	Nation	1	2	3	Result	1	2	3	Result	Total
1st place, gold medalist(s)	Kim Un-guk	North Korea	135	140	~~142~~	140	160	165	170	170	310
2nd place, silver medalist(s)	Yang Sheng-hsiung	Chinese Taipei	127	132	~~135~~	132	160	~~164~~	164	164	296
3rd place, bronze medalist(s)	Cha Kum-chol	North Korea	135	140	~~143~~	140	155	~~162~~	~~163~~	155	295
4	Ji Hun-min	South Korea	127	133	~~135~~	133	150	160	~~163~~	160	293

==== 69 kg ====
Rank	Athlete	Nation	Snatch (kg)				Clean & Jerk (kg)				Total
Rank	Athlete	Nation	1	2	3	Result	1	2	3	Result	Total
1st place, gold medalist(s)	Kim Kum-sok	North Korea	135	~~141~~	141	141	170	180	~~185~~	180	321
2nd place, silver medalist(s)	Tang Deshang	China	140	145	~~150~~	145	175	~~180~~	~~180~~	175	320
3rd place, bronze medalist(s)	Wu Tsung-ling	Chinese Taipei	125	130	133	133	~~155~~	155	~~158~~	155	288
4	Tomohiro Asada	Japan	120	125	~~130~~	125	150	~~157~~	~~163~~	150	275

==== 77 kg ====
Rank	Athlete	Nation	Snatch (kg)				Clean & Jerk (kg)				Total
Rank	Athlete	Nation	1	2	3	Result	1	2	3	Result	Total
1st place, gold medalist(s)	Kim Kwang-hoon	South Korea	145	150	153	153	183	194	199	199	352
2nd place, silver medalist(s)	Liao Hui	China	~~155~~	155	~~160~~	155	191	~~196~~	196	196	351
3rd place, bronze medalist(s)	Pang Kum-chol	North Korea	146	151	~~156~~	151	180	~~190~~	~~197~~	180	331

==== 85 kg ====
Rank	Athlete	Nation	Snatch (kg)				Clean & Jerk (kg)				Total
Rank	Athlete	Nation	1	2	3	Result	1	2	3	Result	Total
1st place, gold medalist(s)	Lu Yong	China	155	165	170	170	190	195	200	200	370
2nd place, silver medalist(s)	Cheon Jeong-pyung	South Korea	140	145	148	148	180	185	—	185	333
3rd place, bronze medalist(s)	Yuji Yoshioka	Japan	150	~~157~~	~~157~~	150	170	~~180~~	~~180~~	170	320
4	Woo Wai Shun	Hong Kong	~~70~~	70	~~81~~	70	90	101	~~105~~	101	171

==== 94 kg ====
Rank	Athlete	Nation	Snatch (kg)				Clean & Jerk (kg)				Total
Rank	Athlete	Nation	1	2	3	Result	1	2	3	Result	Total
1st place, gold medalist(s)	Jiang Hairong	China	165	170	~~175~~	170	196	204	~~208~~	204	374
2nd place, silver medalist(s)	Kim Min-jae	South Korea	160	~~170~~	171	171	195	203	~~208~~	208	374
3rd place, bronze medalist(s)	Yuki Hiraoka	Japan	~~145~~	145	~~152~~	145	185	~~190~~	~~190~~	185	330

==== 105 kg ====
Rank	Athlete	Nation	Snatch (kg)				Clean & Jerk (kg)				Total
Rank	Athlete	Nation	1	2	3	Result	1	2	3	Result	Total
1st place, gold medalist(s)	Yang Zhe	China	170	175	180	180	205	210	—	210	390
2nd place, silver medalist(s)	Kim Wha-sung	South Korea	~~170~~	170	~~176~~	170	190	200	—	200	370
3rd place, bronze medalist(s)	Hsieh Wei-chun	Chinese Taipei	150	~~157~~	~~162~~	150	190	196	~~206~~	196	346
4	Yuya Fukumine	Japan	~~135~~	135	~~140~~	135	175	185	195	190	325

==== +105 kg ====
Rank	Athlete	Nation	Snatch (kg)				Clean & Jerk (kg)				Total
Rank	Athlete	Nation	1	2	3	Result	1	2	3	Result	Total
1st place, gold medalist(s)	An Yong-kwon	South Korea	175	185	—	185	210	220	—	220	405
2nd place, silver medalist(s)	Kazuomi Ota	Japan	173	~~180~~	~~181~~	173	209	~~217~~	—	200	382
3rd place, bronze medalist(s)	Chen Shih-chieh	Chinese Taipei	162	171	~~173~~	171	~~200~~	200	~~208~~	200	371
4	Ri Jae-gyong	North Korea	115	122	~~130~~	122	~~165~~	165	~~172~~	165	287

=== Women's results ===
==== 48 kg ====
Rank	Athlete	Nation	Snatch (kg)				Clean & Jerk (kg)				Total
Rank	Athlete	Nation	1	2	3	Result	1	2	3	Result	Total
1st place, gold medalist(s)	Yang Lian	China	85	88	90	90	103	108	112	112	202
2nd place, silver medalist(s)	Chen Wei-ling	Chinese Taipei	79	~~83~~	~~83~~	79	105	113	—	113	192
3rd place, bronze medalist(s)	Ryang Chun-hwa	North Korea	75	80	84	84	100	104	108	108	192
4	Honami Mizuochi	Japan	70	72	74	74	90	92	94	94	168

==== 53 kg ====
Rank	Athlete	Nation	Snatch (kg)				Clean & Jerk (kg)				Total
Rank	Athlete	Nation	1	2	3	Result	1	2	3	Result	Total
1st place, gold medalist(s)	Li Ping	China	88	93	~~96~~	93	115	120	122	122	215
2nd place, silver medalist(s)	Paek Un-hui	North Korea	86	~~88~~	88	88	113	~~118~~	~~118~~	113	201
3rd place, bronze medalist(s)	Yu Weili	Hong Kong	~~85~~	85	87	87	105	108	112	112	199
4	Fang Li-chun	Chinese Taipei	~~83~~	83	~~86~~	83	109	112	~~116~~	112	195
5	Hiromi Miyake	Japan	82	~~85~~	~~85~~	82	105	~~110~~	110	110	192

==== 58 kg ====
Rank	Athlete	Nation	Snatch (kg)				Clean & Jerk (kg)				Total
Rank	Athlete	Nation	1	2	3	Result	1	2	3	Result	Total
1st place, gold medalist(s)	Jong Chun-mi	North Korea	95	~~100~~	100	100	125	130	132	132	232
2nd place, silver medalist(s)	Li Xueying	China	~~98~~	98	103	103	123	128	~~131~~	128	231
3rd place, bronze medalist(s)	O Jong-ae	North Korea	93	96	~~100~~	96	125	~~130~~	~~130~~	125	221
4	Lin Wan-hsuan	Chinese Taipei	~~87~~	~~87~~	87	87	110	~~120~~	~~120~~	110	197
5	Kim So-hwa	South Korea	80	85	87	87	100	105	~~107~~	105	192
6	Moeha Matsumoto	Japan	~~82~~	82	86	86	~~102~~	102	~~107~~	102	188
7	Otgontuya Gongor	Mongolia	~~75~~	75	78	78	95	100	~~102~~	100	178
8	Kam Wing Yee	Hong Kong	60	65	70	70	80	85	90	90	160

==== 63 kg ====
Rank	Athlete	Nation	Snatch (kg)				Clean & Jerk (kg)				Total
Rank	Athlete	Nation	1	2	3	Result	1	2	3	Result	Total
1st place, gold medalist(s)	Pak Hyon-suk	North Korea	102	107	110	110	133	137	~~143~~	137	247
2nd place, silver medalist(s)	Liu Xia	Macau	95	100	103	103	118	~~134~~	—	118	221
3rd place, bronze medalist(s)	Guo Xiyan	China	100	103	110	110	110	~~134~~	~~138~~	110	220
—	Namkhaidorjiin Bayarmaa	Mongolia	~~80~~	~~80~~	~~82~~	—	—	—	—	—	—
—	Mun Yu-ra	South Korea	~~100~~	~~100~~	~~102~~	—	—	—	—	—	—

==== 69 kg ====
Rank	Athlete	Nation	Snatch (kg)				Clean & Jerk (kg)				Total
Rank	Athlete	Nation	1	2	3	Result	1	2	3	Result	Total
1st place, gold medalist(s)	Zhang Shaoling	Macau	102	106	108	108	122	128	135	135	243
2nd place, silver medalist(s)	Liu Chunhong	China	100	~~105~~	106	106	120	125	~~129~~	125	231
3rd place, bronze medalist(s)	Lu Ying-chi	Chinese Taipei	85	~~90~~	90	90	110	—	—	110	200

==== 75 kg ====
Rank	Athlete	Nation	Snatch (kg)				Clean & Jerk (kg)				Total
Rank	Athlete	Nation	1	2	3	Result	1	2	3	Result	Total
1st place, gold medalist(s)	Cao Lei	China	105	110	112	112	130	135	140	140	252
2nd place, silver medalist(s)	Wang Ya-jhen	Chinese Taipei	95	100	~~102~~	100	~~122~~	126	—	126	226
3rd place, bronze medalist(s)	Lee Ae-ra	South Korea	93	97	100	100	120	~~127~~	~~127~~	120	220
4	Yang Houqin	Macau	92	~~97~~	~~97~~	92	110	115	~~120~~	115	207
5	Byambadorj Uranchimeg	Mongolia	~~75~~	~~75~~	75	75	~~95~~	95	97	97	172

==== +75 kg ====
Rank	Athlete	Nation	Snatch (kg)				Clean & Jerk (kg)				Total
Rank	Athlete	Nation	1	2	3	Result	1	2	3	Result	Total
1st place, gold medalist(s)	Qi Xihui	China	115	122	125	125	145	148	150	150	275
2nd place, silver medalist(s)	Lee Hui-sol	South Korea	108	112	~~121~~	112	137	141	144	144	256
3rd place, bronze medalist(s)	Mami Shimamoto	Japan	105	~~109~~	109	109	137	141	144	144	253
4	Fumiko Jonai	Japan	100	~~103~~	~~103~~	100	133	~~138~~	~~138~~	133	233
