= South Korea at the 2009 East Asian Games =

- IOC code: KOR
- NOC: Korean Olympic Committee

in Hong Kong
- Flag bearer: Park Jun-bum
- Medals Ranked 3rd: Gold 39 Silver 45 Bronze 59 Total 143

East Asian Games appearances
- 1993; 1997; 2001; 2005; 2009; 2013

South Korea competed at the 2009 East Asian Games held in Hong Kong from October 29, 2005, to November 6, 2005.

== Medal summary ==
=== Gold ===
- Athletics women's Triple Jump — Jung Hye-kyung
- Athletics women's Pole Vault — Lim Eun-ji
- Badminton men's Single — Choi Ho-jin
- Basketball men's team competition — Chun Jung-kyu, Han Jung-won, Joo Tae-soo, Kim Bong-su, Kim Hyun-min, Kim Seung-won, Kim Sun-hyung, Park Chan-hee, Park Hyung-Chul, Sin Myong-Ho, Yang Hee-jong, Yoo Byung-Jae
- Bowling men's All Events — Hong Hae-sol
- Bowling men's Masters — Hong Hae-sol
- Bowling men's Trios — Hong Hae-sol, Kim Jae-hoon, Kim Tae-Young
- Bowling men's team of Five — Choi Ki-Bong, Hong Hae-sol, Jang Dong-Chul, Kim Jae-hoon, Kim Tae-young, Seo Sang-cheon
- Bowling women's All Events — Gye Min-young
- Bowling women's Masters — Gye Min-young
- Bowling women's singles — Hwang Sun-ok
- Bowling women's doubles — Gye Min-young, Shin Bo-hyun
- Bowling women's Trios — Hwang Sun-ok, Jeon Eun-hee, Son Yun-hee
- Bowling women's team of Five — Gye Min-Young, Hwang Sun-ok, Jeon Eun-hee, Kang Hye-eun, Son Yun-hee, Shin Bo-hyun
- Cue Sports men's English Billiards — Hwang Chul-ho
- Cue Sports women's 9-ball Pool — Kim Ga-young
- Dancesport Standard – Viennese Waltz — Lee Sang-Min / Kim Hye-In
- Hockey men's team competition — Cho Suk-hoon, Han Ki-moon, Hong Doo-pyo, Hong Sung-kweon, Jang Kyu-yeob, Jeon Byung-jin, Jeong Yun-sang, Jeon Man-jae, Kim Jae-hyeon, Kim Jong-hoon, Kim Kwang-jin, Kim Sam-seok, Kim Seong-kyu, Lee Dong-hyun, Lee Jong-soo, Park Hyung-bong
- Hockey women's team competition — Cha Sena, Han Hye-Lyoung, Jang Soo-ji, Kim Bo-mi, Kim Da-Rae, Kim Eun-sil, Kim Jong-eun, Kim Ok-ju, Kim Young-Ran, Lee Soo-kyung, Oh Su-jin, Oh Sun-soon, Park Jeong-sook, Park Mi-hyun, Tak Se-hee, Yoo Jung-mi
- Judo men's -81 kg — Song Dae-Nam
- Judo men's Open — Kim Soo-Hwan
- Judo women's -70 kg — Choi Mi-young
- Shooting men's Air Pistol — Jin Jong-oh
- Shooting women's Air Pistol — Lee Ho-lim
- Taekwondo men's -58 kg — Lim Chul-ho
- Taekwondo men's -62 kg — Kim Yong-min
- Taekwondo men's -67 kg — Kim Eung-hyun
- Taekwondo men's -72 kg — Song Ji-hoon
- Taekwondo men's -78 kg — Kim Jong-min
- Taekwondo men's -84 kg — Yoo Hee-Sung
- Taekwondo men's +84 kg — Cha Dong-min
- Taekwondo women's -51 kg — Park Myung-Suk
- Taekwondo women's -55 kg — Lee Hye-Young
- Taekwondo women's -63 kg — Kim Sae-Rom
- Taekwondo women's -67 kg — Seo So-Young
- Taekwondo women's -72 kg — Jung Sun-Young
- Taekwondo women's +72 kg — An Sae-Bom
- Weightlifting men's -77 kg — Kim Kwang-Hoon
- Weightlifting men's +105 kg — An Yong-Kwon

=== Silver ===
- Aquatics – Diving men's Synchronized 3m Springboard — Cho Kwan-Hoon, Kwon Kyung-Min
- Aquatics – Swimming men's 100 m Breaststroke — Choi Kyu-Woong
- Aquatics – Swimming men's 100 m Backstroke — Park Seon-Kwan
- Aquatics – Swimming men's 200 m Backstroke — Park Seon-Kwan
- Aquatics – Swimming men's 400m Individual Medley — Kim Min-kyu
- Aquatics – Swimming women's 200 m Breaststroke — Jeong Da-rae
- Athletics men's 200 m — Yeo Hosua
- Athletics men's 400 m — Park Bong-Go
- Athletics men's 800 m — Park Jung-Jin
- Athletics men's Triple Jump — Yoo Jae-Hyeok
- Athletics women's Heptathlon — Lee Eun-Im
- Badminton men's team competition — Cho Geon-Woo, Choi Ho-Jin, Kim Gi-Jung, Kwon Yi-Koo, Shin Baek-cheol, Son Wan-Ho
- Bowling men's All Events — Kim Jae-hoon
- Bowling men's Masters — Kim Jae-hoon
- Bowling men's Trios — Choi Ki-Bong, Jang Dong-Chul, Seo Sang-Cheon
- Bowling women's All Events — Son Yun-Hee
- Bowling women's Masters — Hwang Sun-Ok
- Bowling women's singles — Shin Bo-Hyun
- Bowling women's doubles — Jeon Eun-Hee, Son Yun-Hee
- Bowling women's Trios — Hwang Sun-Ok, Jeon Eun-Hee, Son Yun-Hee
- Dancesport Standard – Dance Five — Nam Sang-Woong / Song Yi-Na
- Dancesport Standard – Slow Foxtrot — Nam Sang-Woong / Song Yi-Na
- Dancesport Standard – Quickstep — Lee Sang-Min / Kim Hye-In
- Dancesport Latin – Samba — Jung Jae-Ho / Yoon So-Yeon
- Dancesport Latin – Cha-Cha-Cha — Jung Jae-Ho / Yoon So-Yeon
- Judo women's -52 kg — Choi Keum-Mai
- Judo women's -63 kg — Jeong Da-Woon
- Judo women's -78 kg — Park Jong-Won
- Judo women's +78 kg — Kim Na-Young
- Rowing men's double sculls — Kim Dong-Yong, Kim Hwi-Kwan
- Rowing women's Single Sculls — Shin Yeong-Eun
- Shooting men's 10m Air Pistol — Lee Dae-myung
- Taekwondo men's -54 kg — Cho Seong-In
- Taekwondo women's -59 kg — Lee Sung-Hye
- Tennis women's Double — Kim So-Hung, Lee Jin-A
- Weightlifting men's -85 kg — Cheon Jeong-Pyung
- Weightlifting men's -94 kg — Kim Min-Jae
- Weightlifting men's -105 kg — Kim Hwa-Seung
- Weightlifting women's +75 kg — Lee Hui-Sol
- Windsurfing men's RS:X — Lee Tae-hoon
- Wushu – Sanshou men's −56 kg — Cha Jun-Youl
- Wushu – Sanshou men's −60 kg — Yoo Hyun-Seok
- Wushu – Sanshou men's −65 kg — Kang Yun-Sik
- Wushu – Sanshou women's −48 kg — Kim Ari
- Wushu – Sanshou women's −52 kg — Lee Jung-Hee

=== Bronze ===
- Aquatics – Diving men's 1m Springboard — Cho Kwan-Hoon
- Aquatics – Diving men's 3m Springboard — Kwon Kyung-Min
- Aquatics – Diving men's Synchronized 10m Platform — Cho Kwan-Hoon, Park Ji-Ho
- Aquatics – Swimming men's 50 m freestyle — Park Min-Kyu
- Aquatics – Swimming men's 50 m backstroke — Jeong Doo-Hee
- Aquatics – Swimming men's 200 m breaststroke — Choi Kyu-Woong
- Aquatics – Swimming men's 200 m individual medley — Park Min-Kyu
- Aquatics – Swimming men's 400 m freestyle — Jang Sang-Jin
- Aquatics – Swimming men's 800 m freestyle — Kang Yong-Hwan
- Aquatics – Swimming men's 1500 m freestyle — Kang Yong-Hwan
- Aquatics – Swimming men's 4 × 200 m freestyle relay — Jang Sang-Jin, Bae Joon-Mo, Kang Yong-Hwan, Park Min-Kyu
- Aquatics – Swimming men's 4 × 100 m medley relay — Park Seon-Kwan, Choi Kyu-Woong, Jeong Doo-Hee, Park Min-Kyu
- Aquatics – Swimming women's 200 m Breaststroke — Jeong Seul-Ki
- Aquatics – Swimming women's 200 m Individual Medley — Kim Seo-Young
- Aquatics – Swimming women's 4 × 200 m freestyle relay — Kim Jung-Hye, Park Na-Ri, Kim Seo-Young, Lee Jae-Young
- Athletics men's 110m Hurdles — Park Tae-Kyong
- Athletics men's 20 km walk — Kim Hyun-Sub
- Athletics women's Hammer Throw — Lee Jae-Young
- Badminton men's single — Son Wan-Ho
- Badminton men's double — Kim Ki-Jung, Kwon Yi-Goo
- Badminton women's team — Bae Seung-Hee, Kang Hae-Won, Kim Mi-Young, Um Hye-Won, Yoo Hyun-Young, Jung Kyung-Eun
- Bowling men's single — Kim Jae-hoon
- Bowling women's All Events — Hwang Sun-Ok
- Bowling women's Masters — Son Yun-Hee
- Bowling women's doubles — Hwang Sun-Ok, Kang Hye-Eun
- Cue Sports men's One-Cushion Carom Singles — Im Hyun-Seong
- Cue Sports women's 6-red Snooker Singles — Cha You-Ram
- Dancesport Standard – Waltz — Kang Dae-Sung / Jang Han-A
- Dancesport Standard – Tango — Kang Dae-Sung / Jang Han-A
- Dancesport Latin – Paso Doble — Kim Sung-Min / Kim Mi-Sun
- Dancesport Latin – Rumba — Kim Sung-Min / Kim Mi-Sun
- Dancesport Latin – American Dance Five — Jung Kwang-Ho, Yeo Song-Hee
- Football men's team competition — Kim Min-Kyu, Kim Ho-You, Kim Jung-Kyum, Kim Hyo-Jun, Don Ji-Deok, Choi Myung-Sung, Park Hyuk-Soon, Jung Jae-Suk, Go Min-Gi, Kim Han-Won, Park Jong-Chan, Lee Seung-Hwan, Yoon Won-Chul, Lee Yong-Seung, Lee Jae-Young, Woo Joo-Young, Jeon Jae-Hee, Kang Sung-Il
- Judo men's -66 kg — Cho Jun-Ho
- Judo men's -73 kg — Kim Won-Jung
- Judo men's -90 kg — Kwon Young-Woo
- Judo men's -100 kg — Shin Kyung-Sub
- Judo men's +100 kg — Kim Su-Wan
- Judo women's -57 kg — Park Hyo-Ju
- Judo women's Open — Kim Na-Young
- Rowing women's lightweight Double Sculls — Kim Sol-Ji, Kim Myung-Sin
- Rugby sevens men's team competition — Moon Sang-Yong, Han Kun-Kyu, Jeon Jong-Man, Kim Won-Yong, Hong Jun-Ki, Yoon Tae-Il, Kim Hyung-Gi, Park Wan-Yong, Jegal Bin
- Shooting women's 10m Air Rifle — Gu Su-Ra
- Squash men's singles — Lee Se-Hyun
- Squash men's doubles — Lee Youn-Ho, Lee Seung-Jun
- Squash women's doubles — Son Sun-mi, Kim Ga-Hye
- Squash women's doubles — An Eun-Chan, Kim Jin-Hee
- Squash mixed doubles — Lee Seung-Jun, Kim Ga-Hye
- Squash men's team — Lee Youn-Ho, Lee Se-Hyun, Kim Dong-Woo, Kim Hyun-Dong
- Squash women's team — Son Sun-mi, Park Eun-Ok, An Eun-Chan, Kim Jin-Hee
- Table tennis men's team — Cho Eon-Rae, Lee Jin-Kwon, Jeong Sang-Eun, Seo Hyun-Deok
- Table tennis women's singles — Seok Ha-Jung
- Table tennis women's doubles — Moon Hyun-Jung, Seok Ha-Jung
- Taekwondo women's -47 kg — Lee Seul-Ki
- Tennis men's singles — Jung Seok-Young
- Tennis women's singles — Lee Jin-A
- Volleyball men's team competition — Seo Jae-Deok, Baek Kwang-Eon, Bu Yong-Chan, Lee Seung-Yong, Lee Jae-Mok, Choi Hong-Seok, Sim Hong-Seok, Ko Jun-Yong, Park Jun-Beom, Jun Jin-Yong, Choi Min-Ho, Lee Chang-Han
- Volleyball women's team competition — Pyo Seung-Ju, Choi Eun-Ji, Chae Sun-A, Kim Ji-Su, Park Jung-A, Kim Hee-Jin, Kim Yoo-Ri, Park Sung-Hee, Kim Un-Hye, Lee Na-Youn, Cho Song-Hwa, An Mi-Sun
- Weightlifting women's -75 kg — Lee Ae-Ra

== Aquatics – Diving ==
Men

Athlete	Event	Final	
Athlete	Event	Points	Rank
Cho Kwan-Hoon	1m Springboard	359.55	Bronze
Park Ji-Ho	1m Springboard	353.40	4th
Park Ji-Ho	3m Springboard	394.45	6th
Park Ji-Ho	10m Platform	426.75	4th
Kwon Kyung-Min	3m Springboard	424.65	Bronze
Cho Kwan-Hoon; Kwon Kyung-Min	Synchronized 3m Springboard	405.69	Silver
Cho Kwan-Hoon; Park Ji-Ho	Synchronized 10m Platform	406.92	Bronze

Women

Athlete	Event	Final	
Athlete	Event	Points	Rank
Kim Na-Mi	1m Springboard	218.20	5th
Kim Na-Mi	3m Springboard	231.05	9th
Cho Eun-Bi	1m Springboard	202.00	7th
Cho Eun-Bi	3m Springboard	196.95	11th
Cho Eun-Bi	10m Platform	296.25	6th
Yoon Seung-Eun	10m Platform	293.80	7th
Cho Eun-Bi; Kim Na-Mi	Synchronized 3m Springboard	274.83	4th
Cho Eun-Bi; Yoon Seung-Eun	Synchronized 10m Platform	276.39	4th

== Aquatics – Swimming ==
Men

Athlete	Event	Heats		Final	
Athlete	Event	Time	Rank	Time	Rank
Jeong Doo-hee	50 m butterfly	24.27 Q	3rd (H2)	24.13	5th
Jeong Doo-hee	50 m backstroke	27.16 Q	2nd (H1)	26.10	Bronze
Jeong Doo-hee	100 m butterfly	55.38 Q	3rd (H2)	52.80	5th
Choi Kyu-woong	50 m breaststroke	28.94 Q	3rd (H1)	28.72	5th
Choi Kyu-woong	100 m breaststroke	1:03.03 Q	2nd (H1)	1:01.00	Silver
Choi Kyu-woong	200 m breaststroke	2:15.77 Q	3rd (H1)	2:11.87	Bronze
Shin Su-jong	50 m breaststroke	29.62 Q	3rd (H2)	29.57	8th
Shin Su-jong	100 m breaststroke	1:03.07 Q	3rd (H1)	1:03.39	6th
Shin Su-jong	200 m breaststroke	2:15.62 Q	2nd (H1)	2:13.85	4th
Park Min-kyu	50 m freestyle	23.12 Q	1st (H1)	22.77	Bronze
Park Min-kyu	100 m freestyle	50.59 Q	2nd (H1)	50.05	4th
Yoo Jung-nam	100 m butterfly	54.39 Q	3rd (H1)	54.04	6th
Yoo Jung-nam	200 m butterfly			1:57.91	5th
Park Seon-kwan	100 m backstroke			54.66	Silver
Park Seon-kwan	200 m backstroke			1:59.89	Silver
Bae Joon-mo	200 m freestyle	1:54.28 Q	2nd (H2)	1:50.75	4th
Bae Joon-mo	400 m freestyle	4:04.32 Q	2nd (H2)	3:55.67	5th
Jang Sang-jin	400 m freestyle	4:04.95 Q	3rd (H2)	3:51.91	Bronze
Jang Sang-jin	800 m freestyle			8:10.69	4th
Kang Yong-hwan	800 m freestyle			8:01.45	Bronze
Kang Yong-hwan	1500 m freestyle			15:41.53	Bronze
Kim Min-kyu	200 m individual medley			2:00.41	Bronze
Kim Min-kyu	400 m individual medley			4:15.27	Silver
Park Seon-kwan; Bae Joon-mo; Jeong Doo-hee; Park Min-kyu	4 × 100 m Medley Relay			3:21.67	4th
Jang Sang-jin; Bae Joon-mo; Kang Yong-hwan; Park Min-kyu	4 × 200 m freestyle relay			7:25.05	Bronze
Park Seon-kwan; Choi Kyu-woong; Jeong Doo-hee; Park Min-kyu	4 × 100 m medley relay			3:37.43	Bronze

Women

Athlete	Event	Heats		Final	
Athlete	Event	Time	Rank	Time	Rank
Jeong Ha-eun	50 m Breaststroke	32.67 Q	2nd (H2)	32.44	8th
Jeong Ha-eun	100 m Breaststroke	1:10.55 Q	2nd (H2)	1:10.05	7th
Jeong Da-rae	50 m Breaststroke	32.00 Q	1st (H2)	31.90	5th
Jeong Da-rae	200 m Breaststroke	2:29.73 Q	1st (H2)	2:24.90	Silver
Jung Seul-ki	100 m Breaststroke	1:09.90 Q	1st (H1)	1:08.87	5th
Jung Seul-ki	200 m Breaststroke	2:32.33 Q	2nd (H2)	2:25.10	Bronze
Kang Yeong-seo	50 m Backstroke	31.20 Q	5th (H2)	30.98	8th
Kang Yeong-seo	100 m Backstroke	1:06.25	4th (H1)	did not advance	
Kang Yeong-seo	200 m Backstroke	50.59 Q	2nd (H1)	50.05	4th
Kim Yu-yeon	50 m Backstroke	30.43 Q	3rd (H2)	30.12	6th
Kim Yu-yeon	100 m Backstroke	1:05.40 Q	4th (H2)	1:03.65	7th
Kim Jung-hye	50 m Freestyle	26.55 Q	4th (H2)	26.80	7th
Kim Jung-hye	100 m Freestyle	56.80 Q	3rd (H2)	56.35	8th
Kim Jung-hye	200 m Freestyle	2:04.03 Q	3rd (H2)	2:01.73	4th
Lee Jae-young	50 m Freestyle	26.63 Q	3rd (H1)	26.09	6th
Lee Jae-young	100 m Freestyle	56.96 Q	4th (H2)	56.26	7th
Lee Jae-young	200 m Freestyle	2:03.96 Q	3rd (H1)	2:03.13	6th
Cho Yeon-soo	400 m Freestyle	4:19.21 Q	2nd (H2)	4:16.48	4th
Cho Yeon-soo	800 m Freestyle			9:01.95	7th
Kim Seo-yeong	100 m Butterfly	1:01.80 Q	4th (H2)	59.63	4th
Kim Seo-yeong	200 m Individual Medley	2:17.93 Q	2nd (H1)	2:13.65	Bronze
Kim Seo-yeong	400 m Individual Medley	4:58.95 Q	3rd (H1)	4:54.24	6th
Park Na-ri	100 m Butterfly	1:00.43 Q	3rd (H1)	59.98	7th
Park Na-ri	200 m Butterfly			2:12.44	5th
Nam Yoo-sun	200 m Individual Medley	2:18.19 Q	3rd (H1)	2:15.27	6th
Nam Yoo-sun	400 m Individual Medley	4:56.41 Q	1st (H1)	4:45.32	4th
Kim Seo-yeong; Park Na-ri; Kim Jung-hye; Lee Jae-young	4 × 100 m freestyle relay			3:45.49	4th
Kim Jung-hye; Park Na-ri; Kim Seo-yeong; Lee Jae-young	4 × 200 m freestyle relay			8:07.73	Bronze
Kim Yu-yeon; Jung Seul-ki; Kim Seo-yeong; Lee Jae-young	4 × 100 m Medley Relay			4:09.30	4th

== Athletics ==
=== Track and road ===
Men

Athletes	Event	Heat		Final	
Athletes	Event	Result	Rank	Result	Rank
Kim Kook-Young	100 m	10.79	5th	did not advance	
Lim Hee-Nam	100 m	10.79	4th Q	10.66	7th
Jeon Duck-Hyang	200 m	21.48	4th Q	21.58	7th
Yeo Hosua	200 m	21.35	1st Q	21.27	Silver
Lee Hyun-Bok	400 m	48.71	4th Q	48.55	7th
Park Bong-Go	400 m	47.30	2nd Q	46.96	Silver
Park Jung-Jin	800 m			1:50.83	Silver
Park Jung-Jin	1500 m			3:59.57	4th
Park Tae-Kyong	110 m Hurdles	13.95	1st Q	14.02	Bronze
Lee Seung-Yoon	400 m Hurdles			52.03	4th
Kim Hyun-Sub	20 km walk			1:26:59	Bronze
Kim Min	Half Marathon			1:07.38	4th
Jeon Duck-Hyang; Kim Kook-Young; Lim Hee-Nam; Park Bong-Go; Park Tae-Kyong; Yeo Hosua	4 × 100 m Relay			DNS	-
Jeon Duck-Hyang; Kim Kook-Young; Lim Hee-Nam; Park Bong-Go; Park Tae-Kyong; Yeo Hosua	4 × 400 m Relay			DNS	-

Women

Athletes	Event	Heat		Final	
Athletes	Event	Result	Rank	Result	Rank
Jung Hye-Lim	100 m Hurdles			13.61	4th
Lee Eun-Im	Heptathlon			4608	Silver
Lee Eun-Im	Half Marathon			1:14:47	4th

=== Field ===
Men

Athletes	Event	Final	
Athletes	Event	Result (m)	Rank
Ji Jae-Hyung	High Jump	2.05	7th
Kim Jang-Jun	Long Jump	7.30	6th
Kim Jang-Jun	Triple Jump	DNS	-
Yoo Jae-Hyeok	Triple Jump	15.61	Silver
Jin Min-Sub	Pole vault	4.80	4th
Lee Jeong-Kwon	Hammer Throw	62.62	4th
OH Nam-Kyun	Shot Put	16.45	5th

Women

Athletes	Event	Final	
Athletes	Event	Result (m)	Rank
Bae Chan-Mi	Long Jump	5.70	6th
Jung Hye-Kyung	Triple Jump	13.56	Gold
Lim Eun-Ji	Pole vault	4.20	Gold
Kim Min	Discus Throw	45.27	5th
Lee Jae-Young	Hammer Throw	50.69	Bronze
Seo Hae-An	Javelin Throw	51.63	4th

== Basketball ==
=== Men's competition ===
Preliminary round (Group B)

- December 2 South Korea 66 – 74 Japan
- December 4 South Korea 108 – 67 Hong Kong
- December 6 South Korea 121 – 72 Guam

Team	W	L	PF	PA	PD	Pts
Japan	3	0	270	189	+81	6
South Korea	2	1	295	213	+82	4
Hong Kong	1	2	230	262	-32	2
Guam	0	3	188	319	-131	0

Semifinal

- December 8 South Korea 91 – 59 China

Final

- December 11 South Korea 98 – 97 Chinese Taipei

South Korea men's basketball team won the Gold medal.

=== Women's competition ===
Preliminary round

- December 2 South Korea 60 – 91 Japan
- December 4 South Korea 102 – 51 Hong Kong
- December 6 South Korea 62 – 78 China
- December 7 South Korea 56 – 91 Chinese Taipei

Team	W	L	PF	PA	PD	Pts
Chinese Taipei	3	1	340	235	+105	6
China	3	1	318	213	+105	6
Japan	3	1	338	241	+97	6
South Korea	1	3	280	311	-31	2
Hong Kong	0	4	170	456	-286	0

Quarterfinal

- December 8 South Korea 58 – 78 Chinese Taipei

Bronze-medal match

- December 11 South Korea 77 – 86 Japan

South Korea women's basketball team gain 4th position.

== Cue Sports ==
Men

Athlete	Event	Quarterfinals	Semifinals	Final	
Athlete	Event	Opposition Score	Opposition Score	Opposition Score	Rank
Kim Do-Hoon	15-red Snooker Single	(Macau) Si Tou Chong Wut (MAC); W 4-3	(China) Tian Peng Fei (CHN); L 0-4	(Chinese Taipei) Wu Yu-Lun (TPE); L 0-4	4th
Kim Do-Hoon	6-red Snooker Single	(Chinese Taipei) Huang Chih-Hua (TPE); W 5-2	(China) Yu Delu (CHN); L 1-5	(Chinese Taipei) Wu Yu-Lun (TPE); L 0-5	4th
Kim Do-Hoon	English Billiards Single	(Hong Kong) Lee Eric (HKG); L 0-3	did not advance		
Hwang Chul-Ho	15-red Snooker Single	(Chinese Taipei) Wu Yu-Lun (TPE); L 0-4	did not advance		
Hwang Chul-Ho	6-red Snooker Single	(Chinese Taipei) Wu Yu-Lun (TPE); L 1-5	did not advance		
Hwang Chul-Ho	English Billiards Single	(Macau) Lam Kam Hung (MAC); W 3-0	(Hong Kong) Lee Chen Man (HKG); W 3-1	(Hong Kong) Lee Eric (HKG); W 3-1	Gold
Kim Do-Hoon; Hwang Chul-Ho	15-red Snooker Team		Hong Kong (HKG); L 0-3	China (CHN); L 0-3	4th
Jeong Young-Hwa	9-ball Pool Single	(Chinese Taipei) Yang Ching-Shun (TPE); L 3-11	did not advance		
Kim Woong-Dae	9-ball Pool Single	(Chinese Taipei) Lu Hui-Chan (TPE); W 11-10	(Hong Kong) Kwok Chi Ho (HKG); L 7-11	(Japan) Oi Naoyuki (JPN); L 8-11	4th
Cho Jae-Ho	One-Cushion Carom Single	(Chinese Taipei) Yuan Yung-Kuo (TPE); W 100-56	(Japan) Machida Tadashi (JPN); L 82-100	(South Korea) Lim Hyun-Sung (KOR); L 53-100	4th
Lim Hyun-Sung	One-Cushion Carom Single	(Hong Kong) Lee Eric (HKG); W 100-35	(Japan) Mori Yoichiro (JPN); L 40-100	(South Korea) Cho Jae-Ho (KOR); W 100-53	Bronze

Women

Athlete	Event	Quarterfinals	Semifinals	Final	
Athlete	Event	Opposition Score	Opposition Score	Opposition Score	Rank
Cha Yoo-Ram	9-ball Pool Single	(China) Bi ZhuQing (CHN); W 7-4	(Japan) Kawahara Chihiro (JPN); L 5-7	(Chinese Taipei) Lin Yuan-Chun (TPE); L 1-7	4th
Cha Yoo-Ram	6-red Snooker Single	(Hong Kong) Ip Wan In Jaique (HKG); W 4-0	(China) Bi ZhuQing (CHN); L 0-4	(South Korea) Kim Ga-Young (KOR); W 4-0	Bronze
Kim Ga-Young	9-ball Pool Single	(Japan) Fuke Miyuki (JPN); W 7-6	(Chinese Taipei) Lin Yuan-Chun (TPE); W 7-3	(Japan) Kawahara Chihiro (JPN); W 7-6	Gold
Kim Ga-Young	6-red Snooker Single	(Hong Kong) Yu Ching Ching (HKG); W 4-2	(China) Chen Xue (CHN); L 3-4	(South Korea) Cha Yoo-Ram (KOR); L 0-4	4th

== Cycling ==
=== Road ===
Men

Athlete	Event	Time	Rank
Gong Hyo-Seok	Road race	DNF	
Jang Sun-jae	Road race	DNF	
Kim Dong-Hun	Road race	DNF	
Park Seon-Ho	Road race	DNF	
Jang Sun-jae; Kim Dong-Hun; Park Seon-Ho; Gong Hyo-Seok	Time Trial	1:52:49.27 (+14:10.43)	6th

Women

Athlete	Event	Time	Rank
Son Eun-Ju	Road race	2:46:09 (+2:28)	6th

== Football ==
=== Group B ===
Team	Pld	W	D	L	GF	GA	GD	Pts
Hong Kong	2	1	0	1	4	2	2	3
South Korea	2	1	0	1	4	4	0	3
China	2	1	0	1	1	3	-2	3

3 December 2009
UTC+8 18:00

Hong Kong	4 – 1	South Korea
Chan Wai Ho 21'; Wong Chin Hung 30'; Xu Deshuai 65'; Chan Siu Ki 81'	Report	Go Min-Gi 45'

Siu Sai Wan Sports Ground, Hong Kong
Attendance: 5,000
Referee: Phung Dinh Dung (Vietnam)

6 December 2009
UTC+8 18:00

South Korea	3 – 0	China
Park Jong-Chan 49', 65'; Kim Ho-You 79' (pen.)	Report

Siu Sai Wan Sports Ground, Hong Kong
Attendance: 3,160
Referee: Sgt Win Cho (Myanmar)

=== Semifinal ===
10 December 2009
UTC+8 17:00

Japan	2 – 1 (a.e.t.)	South Korea
Yamamoto 9'; Nagai 120+1'	Report	Kim Ho-You 21'

Hong Kong Stadium, Hong Kong
Attendance: 7,534
Referee: Krishnan Ramachandran (Malaysia)

=== Bronze-medal match ===
12 December 2009
UTC+8 13:00

South Korea	1 – 1 (a.e.t.)	North Korea
Go Min-Gi 24'	Report	Pak Song-Chol 52'
Penalties
Go Min-Gi (penalty scored); Woo Choo-Young (penalty scored); Jung Jae-Suk (penalty scored); Lee Jea-Young (penalty scored)	4 – 2	(penalty scored) Choe Myong-Ho; (penalty scored) Pak Song-Chol; (penalty missed) Jon Kwang-Ik; (penalty missed) Kim Kuk-Jin

Hong Kong Stadium, Hong Kong
Attendance: 28,246
Referee: Sukhbir Singh (Singapore)

South Korea men's football team won the Bronze medal.

== Hockey ==
=== Men's competition ===
Preliminary round

- December 7 South Korea 12 – 1 Macau
- December 8 South Korea 1 – 1 Japan
- December 10 South Korea 3 – 1 China
- December 11 South Korea 5 – 1 Hong Kong

Team	Pld	W	D	L	GF	GA	GD	Pts
Japan	4	3	1	0	31	2	+29	10
South Korea	4	3	1	0	21	4	+17	10
China	4	2	0	2	23	9	+14	6
Hong Kong	4	1	0	3	7	17	-10	3
Macau	4	0	0	4	2	53	-51	0

Final

- December 13 South Korea – Japan

=== Women's competition ===
Preliminary round

- December 5 South Korea 9 – 0 Chinese Taipei
- December 7 South Korea 0 – 3 China
- December 9 South Korea 8 – 0 Hong Kong
- December 10 South Korea 4 – 2 Japan

Team	Pld	W	D	L	GF	GA	GD	Pts
China	4	4	0	0	17	0	+17	12
South Korea	4	3	0	1	21	5	+16	9
Japan	4	2	0	2	18	5	+13	6
Hong Kong (a)	4	0	1	3	1	24	-23	1
Chinese Taipei	4	0	1	3	1	24	-23	1

Final

- December 12 South Korea 4 – 1 China

South Korea women's field hockey team won the Bronze medal.

== Rugby sevens ==
Preliminary round

- December 5 South Korea 12 – 12 China
- December 5 South Korea 39 – 5 Guam
- December 5 South Korea 12 – 19 Japan
- December 6 South Korea 19 – 21 Hong Kong
- December 6 South Korea 24 – 7 Chinese Taipei

Team	Pld	W	D	L	PF	PA	+/-	Pts
Japan	5	4	0	1	108	45	+63	12
Hong Kong	5	4	0	1	107	67	+40	12
China	5	3	1	1	117	57	+60	11
South Korea	5	2	1	2	106	64	+42	8
Chinese Taipei	5	1	0	4	67	119	-52	3
Guam	5	0	0	5	33	186	-153	0

Bronze-medal match

- December 6 South Korea 14 – 12 China

South Korea men's rugby union (sevens) team won the Bronze medal.

== Shooting ==
Men

Athlete	Event	Qualification		Final		Rank
Athlete	Event	Score	Rank	Score	Total	Rank
Jin Jong-oh	10 m air pistol	584	1st	101.8	685.8 GR	Gold
Lee Dae-myung	10 m air pistol	583	2nd	102.4	685.4	Silver
Kim Jong-Hyun	10 m air rifle	595	3rd	101.8	696.8	4th

Women

Athlete	Event	Qualification		Final		Rank
Athlete	Event	Score	Rank	Score	Total	Rank
Lee Ho-Rim	10 m air pistol	388	1st	97.9	485.9 GR	Gold
Lee Yun-Hee	10 m air pistol	377	8th	96.9	473.9	8th
Goo Soo-Ra	10 m air rifle	395	4th	101.8	696.8	Bronze
Lee Da-Hye	10 m air rifle	393	5th	100.7	493.7	6th

== Squash ==
Men

Athlete	Event	Quarterfinals	Semifinals	Final	
Athlete	Event	Opposition Result	Opposition Result	Opposition Result	Rank
Lee Se-Hyun	Sigle	(Japan) Fukui Yuta (JPN); W 3 – 0	(Hong Kong) Lau Siu Wai (HKG); L 0 – 3	did not advance	Bronze
Lee Yeon-Ho	Single	(Japan) Tsukue Shinnosuke (JPN); L 2 – 3	did not advance		
Jin Sung-Woo; Kim Dong-Woo	Double	(Japan) Fukui Yuta / Tsukue Shinnosuke (JPN); L 1 – 2	did not advance		
Lee Yeon-Ho; Lee Seung-Joon	Double	(Macau) Amante Armando / Lao Chi Hang (MAC); W 2 – 0	(Hong Kong) Kwong Yu Shun / Wong Wai Hang (HKG); L 0 – 2	did not advance	Bronze
Kim Dong-Woo; Kim Hyun-Dong; Lee Yeon-Ho; Lee Se-Hyun	Team	Japan (JPN); L 0 – 2	Hong Kong (HKG); L 0 – 2	Macau (MAC); W 2 – 0	Bronze

Women

Athlete	Event	Quarterfinals	Semifinals	Final	
Athlete	Event	Opposition Result	Opposition Result	Opposition Result	Rank
Song Sun-mi	Sigle	(Japan) Kobayashi Misaki (JPN); L 1 – 3	did not advance		
Park Eun-Ok	Single	(Japan) Matsui Chinatsu (JPN); L 0 – 3	did not advance		
Kim Ga-Hye; Song Sun-mi	Double	(China) Jiang Li / Li Dong Jin (CHN); W 2 – 0	(Hong Kong) Chan Ho Ling / Chiu Wing Yin (HKG); L 0 – 2	did not advance	Bronze
Ahn Eun-Chan; Kim Jin-Hee	Double	(Japan) Kobayashi Misaki / Matsui Chinatsu (JPN); W 2 – 1	(Hong Kong) Au Wing Chi / Ng Jia Yunn (HKG); L 1 – 2	did not advance	Bronze
Ahn Eun-Chan; Kim Jin-Hee; Park Eun-Ok; Song Sun-mi	Team	Japan (JPN); L 1 – 2	Hong Kong (HKG); L 0 – 2	China (CHN); W 2 – 1	Bronze

Mixed

Athlete	Event	Quarterfinals	Semifinals	Final	
Athlete	Event	Opposition Result	Opposition Result	Opposition Result	Rank
Park Eun-Ok; Ryou Gong-Sun	Double	(Japan) Fukui Yuta / Matsui Chinatsu (JPN); L 0 – 2	did not advance		
Kim Ga-Hye; Lee Seung-Joon	Double	(Japan) Kobayashi Misaki / Tsukue Shinnosuke (JPN); W 2 – 0	(Hong Kong) Chiu Wing Yin / Ngan Lun Cheung (HKG); L 0 – 2	did not advance	Bronze

== Table tennis ==
=== Men ===
Athlete	Event	Round 1	Quarterfinals	Semifinals	Final	
Athlete	Event	Opposition Result	Opposition Result	Opposition Result	Opposition Result	Rank
Lee Jin-Kwon	Single	(China) Xu Xin (CHN); L 0 – 4	did not advance			
Cho Eon-Rae	Single	(Chinese Taipei) Wu Chih-Chi (TPE); W 4 – 0	(Hong Kong) Cheung Yuk (HKG); L 0 – 4	did not advance		
Cho Eon-Rae; Lee Jin-Kwon	Double	(Chinese Taipei) Chiang Hung-Chieh / Huang Sheng-sheng (TPE); W 4 – 1	(Hong Kong) Cheung Yuk / Li Ching (HKG); L 1 – 4	did not advance		
Jeong Sang-Eun; Seo Hyun-Deok	Double	(China) Hao Shuai / Lei Zhenhua (CHN); W 4 – 3	(Chinese Taipei) Chiang Peng-lung / Wu Chih-Chi (TPE); L 1 – 4	did not advance		

Team

- Participants : Cho Eon-Rae, Lee Jin-Kwon, Jeong Sang-Eun, Seo Hyun-Deok

Group Round (Group B)

- December 2 South Korea 3 – 1 Chinese Taipei
- December 2 South Korea 3 – 2 Hong Kong

Team	Pts	Pld	W	L	GW	GL
South Korea	4	2	2	0	6	3
Chinese Taipei	3	2	1	1	5	4
Hong Kong	2	2	0	2	2	6

Semifinal

- December 5 South Korea 0 – 3 Japan

South Korea table tennis team won the Bronze medal.

=== Women ===
Athlete	Event	Round 1	Quarterfinals	Semifinals	Final	
Athlete	Event	Opposition Result	Opposition Result	Opposition Result	Opposition Result	Rank
Seok Ha-Jung	Single	(Chinese Taipei) Cheng I-Ching (TPE); W 4 – 2	(Hong Kong) Jiang Hua Jun (HKG); W 4 – 2	(China) Yao Yan (CHN); L 3 – 4	did not advance	Bronze
Lee Eun-Hee	Single	(China) Wen Jia (CHN); L 1 – 4	did not advance			
Lee Eun-Hee; Park Young-Sook	Double	(China) Hou Xiaoxu / Rao Jingwen (CHN); L 2 – 4	did not advance			
Moon Hyun-Jung; Seok Ha-Jung	Double		(Chinese Taipei) Cheng I-Ching / Huang Yi-Hua (TPE); W 4 – 1	(Japan) Fujii Hiroko / Wakamiya Misako (JPN); L 3 – 4	did not advance	Bronze

Team

- Participants : Lee Eun-Hee, Park Young-Sook, Moon Hyun-Jung, Seok Ha-Jung

Group Round (Group B)

- December 2 South Korea 2 – 3 Chinese Taipei
- December 3 South Korea 0 – 3 Hong Kong

Team	Pts	Pld	W	L	GW	GL
Hong Kong	4	2	2	0	6	0
Chinese Taipei	3	2	1	1	3	5
South Korea	2	2	0	2	2	6

=== Mixed ===
Athlete	Event	Round 1	Quarterfinals	Semifinals	Final	
Athlete	Event	Opposition Result	Opposition Result	Opposition Result	Opposition Result	Rank
Park Young-Sook; Cho Eon-Rae	Double	(China) Hou Xiaoxu / Liu Yi (CHN); W 4 – 2	(Japan) Ishikawa Kasumi / Kishikawa Seiya (JPN); L 3 – 4	did not advance		
Lee Eun-Hee; Lee Jin-Kwon	Double		(Chinese Taipei) Huang Yi-Hua / Wu Chih-Chi (TPE); L 1 – 4	did not advance		

== Taekwondo ==
Men

Athlete	Event	Quarterfinals	Semifinals	Final	
Athlete	Event	Opposition Result	Opposition Result	Opposition Result	Rank
Cho Seong-In	−54 kg		(Japan) Nakagawa Takaya (JPN); W 10 – 6	(Chinese Taipei) Hsu Chia Lin (TPE); L 6 – 6	Silver
Lim Chul-Ho	−58 kg	(Guam) Na Kevin Yujin (GUM); W 7 – 1	(China) Xu Yongzeng (CHN); W 9 – 3	(Chinese Taipei) Chan Yi Chieh (TPE); W 8 – 1	Gold
Kim Yong-Min	−62 kg	(Mongolia) Sukhbold Erdenebat (MGL); W by DSQ	(Chinese Taipei) Tseng Kuan Chieh (TPE); W 7 – 0	(Hong Kong) Poon Chun Ho (HKG); W 8 – 1	Gold
Kim Eung-Hyun	−67 kg		(Chinese Taipei) Lo Tsung Jui (TPE); W 6 – 3	(Mongolia) Naranchimeg Erdenebaatar (MGL); W 6 – 1	Gold
Song Ji-Hoon	−72 kg		(Hong Kong) Yeung Tsz Wing (HKG); W 7 – 0	(Chinese Taipei) Tseng Ching Hsiang (TPE); W 1 – 0	Gold
Kim Jong-Min	−78 kg		(Chinese Taipei) Hsu Cheng Hung (TPE); W 11 – 3	(Macau) Chen Zhiquan (MAC); W 8 – 1	Gold
Yoo Hee-Sung	−84 kg		(Chinese Taipei) Yuan Ming Che (TPE); W 6 – 3	(China) Yin Zhimeng (CHN); W 7 – 2	Gold
Cha Dong-Min	+84 kg			(Chinese Taipei) Wu Ming Chieh (TPE); W 6 – 5	Gold

Women

Athlete	Event	Quarterfinals	Semifinals	Final	
Athlete	Event	Opposition Result	Opposition Result	Opposition Result	Rank
Lee Seul-Ki	−47 kg		(Chinese Taipei) Lee Hsing Hua (TPE); L 6 – 8	did not advance	Bronze
Park Myung-Suk	−51 kg	(Hong Kong) Ma Lai King (HKG); W 6 – -1	(Japan) Kasahara Erika (JPN); W 6 – 3	(Chinese Taipei) Chen Ying Chiu (TPE); W 2 – 1	Gold
Lee Hye-Young	−55 kg		(China) Jiang Mengfei (CHN); W 5 – 2	(Chinese Taipei) Tseng Yi Hsuan (TPE); W 8 – 1	Gold
Lee Sung-Hye	−59 kg		(China) Wu Qiong (CHN); W 3 – 2	(Chinese Taipei) Tseng Pei-hua (TPE); L 2 – 3	Silver
Kim Sae-Rom	−63 kg		(China) Zhang Hua (CHN); W 3 – 1	(Chinese Taipei) Chang Chiung Fang (TPE); W 6 – 3	Gold
Seo So-Young	−67 kg		(Japan) Hattori Mayo (JPN); W 7 – 0	(China) Shao Hua (CHN); W 7 – 0	Gold
Jung Sun-Young	−72 kg			(Chinese Taipei) Chuang Chia Chia (TPE); W 5 – 4	Gold
An Sae-Bom	+72 kg		(Macau) Wang Junnan (MAC); W 5 – 2	(Chinese Taipei) Sun Ai-chi (TPE); W 5 – 4	Gold

== Tennis ==
Men

Athlete	Event	Round 1	Quarterfinals	Semifinals	Final	
Athlete	Event	Opposition Result	Opposition Result	Opposition Result	Opposition Result	Rank
Jung Seok-Young	Single	(Chinese Taipei) Chen Ti (TPE); W 2 – 0	(China) Gong Mao Xin (CHN); W 2 – 1	(Japan) Sugita Yuichi (JPN); L 0 – 2	did not advance	Bronze
Lim Yong-Kyu	Single	(Chinese Taipei) Wang Yeu Tzuoo (TPE); L 1 – 2	did not advance			
Jung Seok-Young; No Sang-Woo	Double	(Guam) Camacho William Joseph / Dugan Justin Neil Rosario (GUM); W 2 – 0	(Japan) Ito Tatsuma / Kondo Hiroki (JPN); L 0 – 2	did not advance		
Lim Yong-Kyu; Seol Jae-Min	Double	(Japan) Moriya Hiroki / Sugita Yuichi (JPN); L 1 – 2	did not advance			

Women

Athlete	Event	Round 1	Quarterfinals	Semifinals	Final	
Athlete	Event	Opposition Result	Opposition Result	Opposition Result	Opposition Result	Rank
Lee Ye-Ra	Single	(China) Ji Chun Mei (CHN); W 2 – 1	(Japan) Doi Misaki (JPN); L 0 – 2	did not advance		
Lee Jin-A	Single		(Japan) Sema Yurika Fatiha (JPN); W 2 – 1	(China) Zhang Shuai (CHN); L 0 – 2	did not advance	Bronze
Kim Keon-Hee; Lee Ye-Ra	Double		(Chinese Taipei) Chuang Chia Jung / Hsieh Su Wei (TPE); L 0 – 2	did not advance		
Kim So-Jung; Lee Jin-A	Double		(Chinese Taipei) Chang Kai Chen / Hsu Wen Hsin (TPE); W 2 – 0	(China) Ji Chun Mei / Xu Yi Fan (CHN); W 2 – 1	(Chinese Taipei) Chuang Chia Jung / Hsieh Su Wei (TPE); L 0 – 2	Silver

Mixed

Athlete	Event	Round 1	Quarterfinals	Semifinals	Final	
Athlete	Event	Opposition Result	Opposition Result	Opposition Result	Opposition Result	Rank
Kim Keon-Hee; Seol Jae-Min	Double	(China) Li Zhe / Xu Yi Fan (CHN); L 0 – 2	did not advance			
Kim So-Jung; Lim Yong-Kyu	Double	(Japan) Doi Misaki / Moriya Hiroki (JPN); L 1 – 2	did not advance			

== Volleyball ==
=== Men's competition ===
Preliminary round – Group B

- December 3 South Korea 3 – 0 Macau
- December 6 South Korea 2 – 3 Japan

Team	Pld	W	L	GF	GA	GD	Pts
Japan	2	2	0	6	2	+4	4
South Korea	2	1	1	5	3	+2	2
Macau	2	0	2	0	6	-6	0

Semifinal

- December 7 South Korea 0 – 3 China

Bronze-medal match

- December 9 South Korea 3 – 0 Hong Kong

South Korea men's volleyball team won the Bronze medal.

=== Women's competition ===
Preliminary round

- December 2 South Korea 3 – 0 Guam
- December 4 South Korea 3 – 0 Hong Kong

Team	Pld	W	L	GF	GA	GD	Pts
South Korea	2	2	0	6	0	+6	4
Hong Kong	2	1	1	3	3	0	2
Guam	2	0	2	0	6	-6	0

Semifinal

- December 8 South Korea 1 – 3 Japan

Final

- December 9 South Korea 3 – 0 Hong Kong

South Korea women's volleyball team won the Bronze medal.

== Weightlifting ==
Men

Athlete	Event	Snatch		Clean & Jerk		Total	Rank
Athlete	Event	Result	Rank	Result	Rank	Total	Rank
Ji Hun-Min	-62 kg	133	3	160	3	293.0	4th
Kim Kwang-Hoon	-77 kg	153	2	199 GR	1	352.0	Gold
Cheon Jeong-Pyung	-85 kg	148	3	185	2	333.0	Silver
Kim Min-Jae	-94 kg	171	1	203	2	374.0	Silver
Kim Hwa-Seung	-105 kg	170	2	200	2	370.0	Silver
An Yong-Kwon	+105 kg	185	1	220	1	405.0	Gold

Women

Athlete	Event	Snatch		Clean & Jerk		Total	Rank
Athlete	Event	Result	Rank	Result	Rank	Total	Rank
Kim So-Hwa	-58 kg	87	5	105	5	192.0	5th
Moon Yoo-Ra	-63 kg	0	-	-	-	0	DNF
Lee Ae-Ra	-75 kg	100	3	120	3	220.0	Bronze
Lee Hui-Sol	+75 kg	112	2	144	3	256.0	Silver

== Windsurfing ==
Men

Athlete	Event	Race										Point	Rank
Athlete	Event	1	2	3	4	5	6	7	8	9	10	Point	Rank
Song Myung-Keun	Mistral lightweight	2	3	3	4	4	4	4	4	~~5~~	4	32	4th
Seo Dong-Woo	Mistral lightweight	~~7~~	7	5	5	5	5	5	5	4	5	46	5th
Lee Tae-hoon	RS:X	1	3	2	1	2	4	~~7~~	3	6	1	23	Silver
Cho Won-Woo	RS:X	5	6	7	6	6	5	4	~~8~~	7	6	52	7th

== Wushu ==
=== Sanshou ===
Men

Athlete	Event	Fight 1	Fight 2	Total	
Athlete	Event	Opposition Result	Opposition Result	Result	Rank
Cha Jun-Youl	−56 kg	(China) Li Haiming (CHN); L 0 – 2	(Hong Kong) Wong Ting Hong (HKG); W 2 – 0	1 win 1 loss	Silver
Athlete	Event	Quarterfinals	Semifinals	Final	
Athlete	Event	Opposition Result	Opposition Result	Opposition Result	Rank
Yoo Hyun-Seok	−60 kg		(Hong Kong) Li Sone Wai (HKG); W 2 – 0	(Macau) Qin Zhijian (MAC); L 0 – 2	Silver
Kang Yun-Sik	−65 kg		(Macau) Cai Junlong (MAC); W 2 – 0	(China) Zhang Yong (CHN); L 0 – 2	Silver

Women

Athlete	Event	Quarterfinals	Semifinals	Final	
Athlete	Event	Opposition Result	Opposition Result	Opposition Result	Rank
Kim Ari	−48 kg		(Chinese Taipei) Tu Hsiao-wei (TPE); W 2 – 0	(China) Zhang Luan (CHN); L 0 – 2	Silver
Lee Jung-Hee	−52 kg		(Mongolia) Amgalanjargal Sangidorj (MGL); W 2 – 0	(China) Zuo Pei Pei (CHN); L 0 – 2	Silver

=== Taolu ===
Men

Athlete	Event	Point		Total	Rank
Athlete	Event	TaijiJian	Taijiquan	Total	Rank
Jang Young-Ho	Taijiquan & TaijiJian	DNS	DNS	-	-
Athlete	Event	Daoshu	Gunshu	Total	Rank
Lee Jong-Chan	Daoshu & Gunshu	9.51	9.47	18.98	6th
Athlete	Event	Nanquan	Nangun	Total	Rank
Kim Tae-Ho	Nanquan & Nangun	9.73	9.52	19.25	4th
Athlete	Event	Changquan		Total	Rank
Lee Jong-Chan	Changquan	9.64		9.64	5th
