= Wushu at the 2009 East Asian Games =

- Dates: 11-13 December

Wushu was contested by both men and women at the 2009 East Asian Games in taolu and sanshou disciplines from 11 to 13 December 2009.

== Medal table ==
Rank	Nation	Gold	Silver	Bronze	Total
1	China (CHN)	11	1	0	12
2	Hong Kong (HKG)	5	4	7	16
3	Macau (MAC)	3	5	5	13
4	South Korea (KOR)	0	5	0	5
5	Chinese Taipei (TPE)	0	3	5	8
6	Mongolia (MGL)	0	2	4	6
7	Japan (JPN)	0	1	1	2
Totals (7 entries)		19	21	22	62

== Medalists ==
=== Taolu ===
==== Men ====
Event	Gold	Silver	Bronze
Changquan	Jia Rui; Macau	Daisuke Ichikizaki; Japan	Leung Ka Wai; Hong Kong
Daoshu+Gunshu	Yang Nianwu; China	Jia Rui; Macau	Cheng Chung Hang; Hong Kong
Jianshu+Qiangshu	Su Baocheng; China	Leung Ka Wai; Hong Kong	Chu Chi Wai; Macau
Nanquan	He Jingde; Hong Kong	Hsu Kai-kuei; Chinese Taipei	Mitsunori Nakata; Japan
Taijiquan	Ma Jianchao; China	Hei Zhihong; Hong Kong	Iao Chon In; Macau
Duilian	Hong Kong; Cheng Chung Hang; Hei Zhihong; Leung Ka Wai	Chinese Taipei; Hsiao Yung-sheng; Hsiao Yung-jih; Hsu Kai-kuei	Macau; Chu Chi Wai; Van Ka Lok

==== Women ====
Event	Gold	Silver	Bronze
Changquan	Zhao Shi; China	Xi Cheng Qing; Macau	Zheng Tianhui; Hong Kong
Daoshu+Gunshu	Geng Xiaoling; Hong Kong	Xi Cheng Qing; Macau	Lei Weng Si; Macau
Jianshu+Qiangshu	Zheng Tianhui; Hong Kong	Li Na; China	Lee Wen-jung; Chinese Taipei
Nanquan	Wei Hong; China	Yuen Ka Ying; Hong Kong	Huang Hsiao-chien; Chinese Taipei
Taijiquan	Li Jin; China	Ho Si Hang; Macau	Wen Ching-ni; Chinese Taipei
Duilian	Hong Kong; Kwan Ning Wa; Yuen Ka Ying; Zheng Tianhui	Macau; Huang Yan Hui; Ho Si Hang	Chinese Taipei; Lee Wen-jung; Huang Hsiao-chien

=== Sanda ===
==== Men ====
Event	Gold	Silver	Bronze
52 kg	Guo Liangliang; China	har Ching Tung; Hong Kong	none awarded
56 kg	Li Haiming; China	Cha Jun-youl; South Korea	Wong Ting Hong; Hong Kong
60 kg	Qin Zhijian; Macau	Yu Hyeon-seok; South Korea	Ulziibadrakh Saruul-Od; Mongolia
60 kg	Qin Zhijian; Macau	Yu Hyeon-seok; South Korea	Li Sone Wai; Hong Kong
65 kg	Zhang Yong; China	Kang Yun-sik; South Korea	Ulziikhutga Gantumur; Mongolia
65 kg	Zhang Yong; China	Kang Yun-sik; South Korea	Cai Junlong; Macau
70 kg	Cai Liangchan; Macau	Chou Ting-yuan; Chinese Taipei	Khuukhenkhuu khatanbaatar Mongolia

==== Women ====
Event	Gold	Silver	Bronze
48 kg	Zhang Luan; China	Kim Ari; South Korea	Chao Ho Yee; Hong Kong
48 kg	Zhang Luan; China	Kim Ari; South Korea	Tu Hsiao-wei; Chinese Taipei
52 kg	Zuo Peipei; China	Lee Jung Hee; South Korea	Sangidorj Amgalanjargal; Mongolia
52 kg	Zuo Peipei; China	Lee Jung Hee; South Korea	Chim Tin Yan; Hong Kong
