= Badminton at the 2009 East Asian Games =

Badminton tournament

2009 East Asian Games
Tournament details
- Dates: 5 – 13 December
- Edition: 3rd
- Venue: Queen Elizabeth Stadium
- Location: Hong Kong

Badminton at the 2009 East Asian Games was held at Hong Kong in the month of December. Competitions for five individual disciplines as well as for Men's and Women's team competitions was conducted. China stood first in the tally by winning three out of seven gold medals while Chinese Taipei, South Korea, Macau and Hong Kong won one gold medals respectively.

== Medal summary ==
=== Medal table ===
* Host nation (Hong Kong)

Rank	Nation	Gold	Silver	Bronze	Total
1	China (CHN)	3	3	3	9
2	Chinese Taipei (TPE)	1	2	5	8
3	South Korea (KOR)	1	1	3	5
4	Hong Kong (HKG)*	1	1	2	4
5	Macau (MAC)	1	0	0	1
6	Japan (JPN)	0	0	1	1
Totals (6 entries)		7	7	14	28

=== Medalists ===
Event	Gold	Silver	Bronze
Men's single	Choi Ho-jin; South Korea	Lin Dan; China	Hsueh Hsuan-yi; Chinese Taipei
Men's single	Choi Ho-jin; South Korea	Lin Dan; China	Son Wan-ho; South Korea
Women's single	Yip Pui Yin; Hong Kong	Zhou Mi; Hong Kong	Chen Xiaojia; China
Women's single	Yip Pui Yin; Hong Kong	Zhou Mi; Hong Kong	Tai Tzu-Ying; Chinese Taipei
Men's double	Chinese Taipei (TPE); Hu Chung-hsien; Tsai Chia-hsin	Chinese Taipei (TPE); Chen Hung-ling; Lin Yu-lang	China (CHN); Chai Biao; Zhang Nan
Men's double	Chinese Taipei (TPE); Hu Chung-hsien; Tsai Chia-hsin	Chinese Taipei (TPE); Chen Hung-ling; Lin Yu-lang	South Korea (KOR); Kim Ki-jung; Kwon Yi-goo
Women's double	Macau (MAC); Zhang Dan; Zhang Zhibo	China (CHN); Ma Jin; Wang Xiaoli	China (CHN); Cheng Shu; Zhao Yunlei
Women's double	Macau (MAC); Zhang Dan; Zhang Zhibo	China (CHN); Ma Jin; Wang Xiaoli	Chinese Taipei (TPE); Chien Yu-chin; Wang Pei-rong
Mixed doubles	China (CHN); Zhang Yawen; Tao Jiaming	China (CHN); Ma Jin; Zhang Nan	Hong Kong (HKG); Yohan Hadikusumo Wiratama; Chau Hoi Wah
Mixed doubles	China (CHN); Zhang Yawen; Tao Jiaming	China (CHN); Ma Jin; Zhang Nan	Chinese Taipei (TPE); Hsieh Pei-chen; Chen Hung-ling
Men's team	China (CHN); Lin Dan; Chen Jin; Du Pengyu; Zhang Nan; Chen Long; Sun Junjie; Chai Biao; Tao Jiaming; Qiu Zihan; Liu Xiaolong	South Korea (KOR); Son Wan-ho; Shin Baek-cheol; Kim Gi-jung; Kwon Yi-goo; Choi Ho-jin; Cho Gun-woo	Chinese Taipei (TPE); Hsieh Yu-hsing; Lin Yu-lang; Chen Hung-ling; Hsueh Hsuan-yi; Tsai Chia-hsin; Hu Chung-hsien; Lu Chi-yuan; Hsu Jen-hao
Men's team	China (CHN); Lin Dan; Chen Jin; Du Pengyu; Zhang Nan; Chen Long; Sun Junjie; Chai Biao; Tao Jiaming; Qiu Zihan; Liu Xiaolong	South Korea (KOR); Son Wan-ho; Shin Baek-cheol; Kim Gi-jung; Kwon Yi-goo; Choi Ho-jin; Cho Gun-woo	Japan (JPN); Sho Sasaki; Kenta Kazuno; Kenichi Hayakawa; Kazushi Yamada; Noriyasu Hirata; Hirokatsu Hashimoto; Koichi Saeki; Kenichi Tago; Shintaro Ikeda; Kazuteru Kozai
Women's team	China (CHN); Xia Jingyun; Ma Jin; Wang Xiaoli; Zhou Hui; Cheng Shu; Zhao Yunlei; Chen Xiaojia; Fu Shanshan; Pan Pan; Zhang Yawen	Chinese Taipei (TPE); Hsu Ya-ching; Pai Hsiao-ma; Tai Tzu-ying; Hsieh Pei-chen; Wang Pei-rong; Chien Yu-chin; Cheng Wen-hsing; Chiang Kai-hsin	Hong Kong (HKG); Zhou Mi; Chau Hoi Wah; Chan Tsz Ka; Wang Chen; Koon Wai Chee; Tse Ying Suet; Yip Pui Yin; Poon Lok Yan; Mong Kwan Yi
Women's team	China (CHN); Xia Jingyun; Ma Jin; Wang Xiaoli; Zhou Hui; Cheng Shu; Zhao Yunlei; Chen Xiaojia; Fu Shanshan; Pan Pan; Zhang Yawen	Chinese Taipei (TPE); Hsu Ya-ching; Pai Hsiao-ma; Tai Tzu-ying; Hsieh Pei-chen; Wang Pei-rong; Chien Yu-chin; Cheng Wen-hsing; Chiang Kai-hsin	South Korea (KOR); Bae Seung-hee; Eom Hye-won; Yoo Hyeon-yeong; Jung Kyung-eun; Kim Mi-young; Kang Hae-won

== Results ==
=== Men's singles ===
Semifinal
1	(China) Lin Dan	21	23
(South Korea) Son Wan-ho	12	21
(Chinese Taipei) Hsueh Hsuan-yi	17	13
(South Korea) Choi Ho-jin	21	21

Final
1	(China) Lin Dan	19	18
(South Korea) Choi Ho-jin	21	21

=== Women's singles ===
Semifinal
1	(Hong Kong) Zhou Mi	21	14	21
(China) Chen Xiaojia	13	21	16
(Chinese Taipei) Tai Tzu-ying	17	21	19
2	(Hong Kong) Yip Pui Yin	21	17	21

Final
1	(Hong Kong) Zhou Mi	21	13	10^{r}
2	(Hong Kong) Yip Pui Yin	15	21	17

=== Men's doubles ===
Semi-finals
1	(Chinese Taipei) Chen Hung-ling (Chinese Taipei) Lin Yu-lang	21	21
(China) Chai Biao (China) Zhang Nan	18	16
(South Korea) Kim Gi-jung (South Korea) Kwon Yi-goo	13	23	10
(Chinese Taipei) Hu Chung-hsien (Chinese Taipei) Tsai Chia-hsin	21	21	21

Final
1	(Chinese Taipei) Chen Hung-ling (Chinese Taipei) Lin Yu-lang	17	20
(Chinese Taipei) Hu Chung-hsien (Chinese Taipei) Tsai Chia-hsin	21	22

=== Women's doubles ===
Semi-finals
1	(China) Ma Jin (China) Wang Xiaoli	22	21	21
(Chinese Taipei) Chien Yu-chin (Chinese Taipei) Wang Pei-rong	24	15	18
(Macau) Zhang Dan (Macau) Zhang Zhibo	21	21
2	(China) Cheng Shu (China) Zhao Yunlei	13	10

Final
1	(China) Ma Jin (China) Wang Xiaoli	20	16
(Macau) Zhang Dan (Macau) Zhang Zhibo	22	21

=== Mixed doubles ===
Semi-finals
1	(Hong Kong) Yohan Hadikusumo Wiratama (Hong Kong) Chau Hoi Wah	14	16
(China) Zhang Nan (China) Ma Jin	21	21
(Chinese Taipei) Chen Hung-ling (Chinese Taipei) Hsieh Pei-chen	15	16
(China) Tao Jiaming (China) Zhang Yawen	21	21

Final
(China) Zhang Nan (China) Ma Jin	15	14
(China) Tao Jiaming (China) Zhang Yawen	21	21
