= Swimming at the 2009 East Asian Games =

Swimming at the 5th East Asian Games was held 6–10 December 2009 in Kowloon, Hong Kong. The competition featured 40 long course (50m) events: 20 for males, 20 for females.

== Participating nations ==
7 nations had swimmers in the 2009 East Asian Games:

- China
- Chinese Taipei
- Guam
- Hong Kong
- Japan
- Macau
- South Korea

== Results ==
=== Men ===
Event	Gold		Silver		Bronze	
50m Freestyle	CAI Li; China	22.56; GR	LU Zhiwu; China	22.58	PARK Min-Kyu; South Korea	22.77
100m Freestyle	Takuro Fujii; Japan	48.76	Yoshihiro Okumura; Japan	49.16	LU Zhiwu; China	49.96
200m Freestyle	Yoshihiro Okumura; Japan	1:46.37; GR	Sho Uchida; Japan	1:46.87	ZHANG Lin; China	1:49.59
400m Freestyle	SUN Yang; China	3:46.16; GR	Sho Uchida; Japan	3:51.36	JANG Sang-Jin; South Korea	3:51.91
800m Freestyle	Yohsuke Miyamoto; Japan	7:59.85; GR	LI Yunqi; China	8:01.30	KANG Yong-Hwan; South Korea	8:01.45
1500m Freestyle	SUN Yang; China	14:58.35; GR	Yohsuke Miyamoto; Japan	15:15.55	KANG Yong-Hwan; South Korea	15:41.53
50m Backstroke	Ryosuke Irie; Japan	25.07; GR	CHENG Feiyi; China	25.62	JEONG Doo-Hee; South Korea	26.10
100m Backstroke	Ryosuke Irie; Japan	52.76; GR	PARK Seon-Kwan; South Korea	54.66	HE Jianbin; China	55.61
200m Backstroke	Ryosuke Irie; Japan	1:53.73; GR	PARK Seon-Kwan; South Korea	1:59.89	ZHANG Yu; China	2:01.56
50m Breaststroke	Ryo Tateishi; Japan	27.84	Yuki Honda; Japan	28.04	WANG Shuai; China	28.14
100m Breaststroke	Ryo Tateishi; Japan	1:00.06; GR	CHOI Kyu-Woong; South Korea	1:01.00	WANG Shuai; China	1:01.33
200m Breaststroke	Ryo Tateishi; Japan	2:09.59; GR	Ryohsuke Shimada; Japan	2:11.81	CHOI Kyu-Woong; South Korea	2:11.87
50m Butterfly	Kohei Kawamoto; Japan	23.60; GR	ZHOU Jiawei; China	23.83	SHI Feng; China	23.99
100m Butterfly	Takuro Fujii; Japan	51.51; GR	Kohei Kawamoto; Japan	51.54	ZHOU Jiawei; China	52.04
200m Butterfly	Ryusuke Sakata; Japan	1:55.23; GR	WU Peng; China	1:56.32	HSU Chi-Chieh; Chinese Taipei	1:56.54
200m I.M.	Yosuke Mori; Japan	1:58.82; GR	Yuma Kosaka; Japan	1:59.74	KIM Min-Gyu; South Korea	2:00.41
400m I.M.	Yuya Horihata; Japan	4:14.89; GR	KIM Min-Gyu; South Korea	4:15.27	Yosuke Mori; Japan	4:15.54
4 × 100 m Freestyle Relay	Japan; Takuro Fujii, GR; Yoshihiro Okumura, Hiroaki Yamamoto, Sho Uchida	3:14.73; GR	China; LU Zhiwu, SHI Tengfei, CHEN Zuo, CAI Li	3:17.43	Hong Kong; LUM Ching Tat, NG Chun Nam, CHEUNG Kin Tat, WONG Kai Wai	3:21.22
4 × 200 m Freestyle Relay	Japan; Sho Uchida, GR; Shunsuke Kuzuhara, Hiroaki Yamamoto, Yoshihiro Okumura	7:10.16; GR	China; ZHANG Lin, LI Yunqi, SHI Tengfei, SUN Yang	7:20.21	South Korea; JANG Sang-Jin, BAE Joon-Mo, KANG Yong-Hwan, PARK Min-Kyu	7:25.05
4 × 100 m Medley Relay	Japan; Ryosuke Irie, Ryo Tateishi, Kohei Kawamoto, Takuro Fujii	3:31.71; GR	China; HE Jianbin, WANG Shuai, ZHOU Jiawei, LU Zhiwu	3:37.00	South Korea; PARK Seon-Kwan, CHOI Kyu-Woong, JEONG Doo-Hee, PARK Min-Kyu	3:37.43

=== Women ===
Event	Gold		Silver		Bronze	
50m Freestyle	LI Zhesi; China	24.68; GR	TANG Yi; China	25.49	Hannah Wilson; Hong Kong	25.70
100m Freestyle	LI Zhesi; China	54.24; GR	TANG Yi; China	54.82	Hannah Wilson; Hong Kong	55.13
200m Freestyle	LIU Jing; China	1:59.55	Misaki Yamaguchi; Japan	2:00.70	AU Hoi Shun; Hong Kong	2:01.67
400m Freestyle	WANG Xinyu; China	4:11.84	Kazuki Wakanami; Japan	4:13.62	AU Hoi Shun; Hong Kong	4:14.58
800m Freestyle	WANG Xinyu; China	8:37.88	Kazuki Wakanami; Japan	8:42.26	Natsumi Iwashita; Japan	8:47.23
1500m Freestyle	Natsumi Iwashita; Japan	16:36.84	Natasha Tang; Hong Kong	16:53.36	Carmen Nam; Hong Kong	17:36.88
50m Backstroke	GAO Chang; China	27.43; GR	ZHAO Jing; China	27.45	Miyuki Takemura; Japan	28.48
100m Backstroke	GAO Chang; China	59.77; GR	ZHAO Jing; China	59.97	Miyuki Takemura; Japan	1:00.86
200m Backstroke	Tomoyo Fukuda; Japan	2:09.30; GR	BAI Anqi; China	2:09.54	Miyuki Takemura; Japan	2:12.15
50m Breaststroke	CHEN Huijia; China	30.46; GR	WANG Randi; China	30.64	Satomi Suzuki; Japan	31.63
100m Breaststroke	CHEN Huijia; China	1:05.64; GR	WANG Randi; China	1:07.30	Satomi Suzuki; Japan	1:07.98
200m Breaststroke	SUN Ye; China	2:22.59; GR	JEONG Da-Rae; South Korea	2:24.90	JUNG Seul-Ki; South Korea	2:25.10
50m Butterfly	JIAO Liuyang; China	25.91; GR	Misaki Ago; Japan	26.64	HONG Wenwen; China	26.65
100m Butterfly	JIAO Liuyang; China	57.28; GR	GUO Fan; China	57.88	Hannah Wilson; Hong Kong	58.85
200m Butterfly	LIU Zige; China	2:04.65; GR	JIAO Liuyang; China	2:06.07	Yuko Nakanishi; Japan	2:09.32
200m I.M.	LIU Jing; China	2:12.10; GR	Tomoyo Fukuda; Japan	2:12.15	KIM Seo-Yeong; South Korea	2:13.65
400m I.M.	CHENG Wan-Jung; Chinese Taipei	4:40.21; GR	LIU Jing; China	4:40.34	ZHENG Rongrong; China	4:41.11
4 × 100 m Freestyle Relay	China; TANG Yi, ZHENG Rongrong, ZHANG Jiaqi, LI Zhesi	3:39.75; GR	Hong Kong; Hannah Wilson, TSAI Hiu Wai, AU Hoi Shun, SZE Hang Yu	3:40.80	Japan; Natsuki Hasegawa, An Yumoto, Akane Hoshi, Misaki Yamaguchi	3:42.55
4 × 200 m Freestyle Relay	China; WANG Xinyu, TANG Yi, HA Sinan, LIU Jing	8:01.14; GR	Hong Kong; SZE Hang Yu, Hannah Wilson, KONG Man-Yi, AU Hoi Shun	8:04.86	South Korea; KIM Jung-Hye, PARK Na-Ri, KIM Seo-Yeong, LEE Jae-Young	8:07.73
4 × 100 m Medley Relay	China; CAO Chang, WANG Randi, JIAO Liuyang, YU Yao	3:58.51; GR	Japan; Miyuki Takemura, Satomi Suzuki, Yuko Nakanishi, Misaki Yamaguchi	4:02.60	Hong Kong; TSAI Hiu Wai, KONG Man-Yi, SZE Hang Yu, Hannah Wilson	4:03.07

=== Medal standings ===
Rank	Nation	Gold	Silver	Bronze	Total
1	China	20	18	10	48
2	Japan	19	14	9	42
3	Chinese Taipei	1	0	1	2
4	South Korea	0	5	12	17
5	Hong Kong	0	3	8	11
Totals (5 entries)		40	40	40	120
