= Cue sports at the 2009 East Asian Games =

Cue sports at the 2009 East Asian Games was held at the Hong Kong International Trade and Exhibition Centre from 3 to 7 December 2009. A total of 8 events were contested.

== Medal table ==
* Host nation (Hong Kong)

Rank	Nation	Gold	Silver	Bronze	Total
1	China (CHN)	3	3	1	7
2	Hong Kong (HKG)*	2	1	1	4
3	South Korea (KOR)	2	0	2	4
4	Japan (JPN)	1	2	1	4
5	Chinese Taipei (TPE)	0	2	3	5
Totals (5 entries)		8	8	8	24

== Medalists ==
=== Men ===
Event	Gold	Silver	Bronze
Snooker singles	Tian Pengfei; China	Yu Delu; China	Wu Yu-lun; Chinese Taipei
Snooker team	Hong Kong (HKG); Chan Kwok Ming; Fung Kwok Wai; Marco Fu	Chinese Taipei (TPE); Huang Chih-hua; Wu Yu-lun; Lin Shu-hung	China (CHN); Tian Pengfei; Yu Delu
Six-red snooker singles	Yu Delu; China	Tian Pengfei; China	Wu Yu-lun; Chinese Taipei
English billiard singles	Hwang Chul-ho; South Korea	Eric Lee; Hong Kong	Lee Chen Man; Hong Kong
Nine-ball singles	Kwok Chi Ho; Hong Kong	Yang Ching-shun; Chinese Taipei	Oi Naoyuki; Japan
One-cushion singles	Yoichiro Mori; Japan	Tadashi Machida; Japan	Lim Hyun-sung; South Korea

=== Women ===
Event	Gold	Silver	Bronze
Six-red snooker singles	Chen Xue; China	Bi Zhuqing; China	Cha You-ram; South Korea
Nine-ball singles	Kim Ga-young; South Korea	Chihiro Kawahara; Japan	Lin Yuan-chun; Chinese Taipei

== Results ==
=== Men ===
==== Snooker singles ====
Pre-quarter-finals; Best of 7 frames
Lin Shu-hung (TPE)	1
Fung Kwok Wai (HKG)	4
Marco Fu (HKG)	4
Zhou Zhaoguo (MAC)	0

Quarter-finals; Best of 7 frames
Tian Pengfei (CHN)	4
Fung Kwok Wai (HKG)	0
Kim Do-hoon (KOR)	4
Si Tou Chong Wut (MAC)	3
Hwang Chul-ho (KOR)	0
Wu Yu-lun (TPE)	4
Marco Fu (HKG)	1
Yu Delu (CHN)	4

Semi-finals; Best of 7 frames
Tian Pengfei (CHN)	4
Kim Do-hoon (KOR)	0
Wu Yu-lun (TPE)	1
Yu Delu (CHN)	4

Final; Best of 7 frames
Tian Pengfei (CHN)	4
Yu Delu (CHN)	2
Third place
Kim Do-hoon (KOR)	0
Wu Yu-lun (TPE)	4

==== Snooker team ====
Quarter-finals; Best of 5 frames
Chinese Taipei (TPE)	3
Macau (MAC)	2

Semi-finals; Best of 5 frames
Hong Kong (HKG)	3
South Korea (KOR)	0
Chinese Taipei (TPE)	3
China (CHN)	1

Final; Best of 5 frames
Hong Kong (HKG)	3
Chinese Taipei (TPE)	1
Third place
South Korea (KOR)	0
China (CHN)	3

==== Six-red snooker singles ====
Pre quarter-finals Best of 9 frames
Wu Yu-lun (TPE)	5
Zhou Zhaoguo (MAC)	0
Yu Delu (CHN)	5
Chan Kwok Ming (HKG)	3

Quarter-finals; Best of 9 frames
Hwang Chul-ho (KOR)	1
Wu Yu-lun (TPE)	5
Tian Pengfei (CHN)	5
Au Chi Wai (HKG)	4
Kim Do-hoon (KOR)	5
Huang Chih-hua (TPE)	2
Yu Delu (CHN)	5
Si Tou Chong Wut (MAC)	0

Semi-finals; Best of 9 frames
Wu Yu-lun (TPE)	2
Tian Pengfei (CHN)	5
Kim Do-hoon (KOR)	1
Yu Delu (CHN)	5

Final; Best of 9 frames
Tian Pengfei (CHN)	3
Yu Delu (CHN)	5
Third place
Wu Yu-lun (TPE)	5
Kim Do-hoon (KOR)	0

==== English billiard singles ====
Quarter-finals; Best of 5 frames (100+ points)
Eric Lee (HKG)	3
Kim Do-hoon (KOR)	0
Lam Kam Hung (MAC)	0
Hwang Chul-ho (KOR)	3

Semi-finals; Best of 5 frames (100+ points)
Ho Chun Chong (MAC)	0
Eric Lee (HKG)	3
Hwang Chul-ho (KOR)	3
Lee Chen Man (HKG)	1

Final; Best of 5 frames (100+ points)
Eric Lee (HKG)	1
Hwang Chul-ho (KOR)	3
Third place
Ho Chun Chong (MAC)	1
Lee Chen Man (HKG)	3

==== Nine-ball singles ====
Quarter-finals; Race to 11
Jeong Young-hwa (KOR)	3
Yang Ching-shun (TPE)	11
Lee Chen Man (HKG)	6
Oi Naoyuki (JPN)	11
Lu Hui-chan (TPE)	10
Kim Woong-dae (KOR)	11
Kwok Chi Ho (HKG)	11
Hisashi Kusano (JPN)	6

Semi-finals; Race to 11
Yang Ching-shun (TPE)	11
Oi Naoyuki (JPN)	4
Kim Woong-dae (KOR)	7
Kwok Chi Ho (HKG)	11

Final; Race to 11
Yang Ching-shun (TPE)	9
Kwok Chi Ho (HKG)	11
Third place
Oi Naoyuki (JPN)	11
Kim Woong-dae (KOR)	8

==== One-cushion singles ====
Quarter-finals; 100 points or 40 innings
Cho Jae-ho (KOR)	100
Yuan Yung-kuo (TPE)	56
Lim Hyun-sung (KOR)	100
Eric Lee (HKG)	35
Szu Chang-yuan (TPE)	80
Yoichiro Mori (JPN)	100

Semi-finals; 100 points or 40 innings
Tadashi Machida (JPN)	100
Cho Jae-ho (KOR)	82
Lim Hyun-sung (KOR)	40
Yoichiro Mori (JPN)	100

Final; 100 points or 40 innings
Tadashi Machida (JPN)	87
Yoichiro Mori (JPN)	100
Third place
Cho Jae-ho (KOR)	53
Lim Hyun-sung (KOR)	100

=== Women ===
==== Six-red snooker singles ====
Quarter-finals; Best of 7 frames
Jaique Ip (HKG)	0
Cha You-ram (KOR)	4
Liu Shin-mei (TPE)	3
Chen Xue (CHN)	4
Yu Ching Ching (HKG)	3
Kim Ga-young (KOR)	4

Semi-finals; Best of 7 frames
Bi Zhuqing (CHN)	4
Cha You-ram (KOR)	0
Chen Xue (CHN)	4
Kim Ga-young (KOR)	3

Final; Best of 7 frames
Bi Zhuqing (CHN)	1
Chen Xue (CHN)	4
Third place
Cha You-ram (KOR)	4
Kim Ga-young (KOR)	0

==== Nine-ball singles ====
Quarter-finals; Race to 7
Chang Shu-Han (TPE)	3
Chihiro Kawahara (JPN)	7
Bi Zhuqing (CHN)	4
Cha You-ram (KOR)	7
Lin Yuan-chun (TPE)	7
Chen Xue (CHN)	4
Miyuki Fuke (JPN)	6
Kim Ga-young (KOR)	7

Semi-finals; Race to 7
Chihiro Kawahara (JPN)	7
Cha You-ram (KOR)	5
Lin Yuan-chun (TPE)	3
Kim Ga-young (KOR)	7

Final; Race to 7
Chihiro Kawahara (JPN)	6
Kim Ga-young (KOR)	7
Third place
Cha You-ram (KOR)	1
Lin Yuan-chun (TPE)	7
