= Wushu at the 2013 East Asian Games =

- Dates: 6-8 December

Wushu was contested by both men and women at the 2013 East Asian Games in taolu and sanshou disciplines from 6–8 December 2013.

== Medal table ==
Taolu only.

Rank	Nation	Gold	Silver	Bronze	Total
1	China (CHN)	6	1	0	7
2	Hong Kong (HKG)	2	2	2	6
3	Macau (MAC)	2	1	6	9
4	Japan (JPN)	1	2	2	5
5	Chinese Taipei (TPE)	1	1	1	3
6	South Korea (KOR)	0	5	1	6
Totals (6 entries)		12	12	12	36

== Medalists ==
=== Men ===
Event	Gold	Silver	Bronze
Changquan	Jia Rui; Macau	Jo Kye-yong; South Korea	Daisuke Ichikizaki; Japan
Nanquan	Liang Yongda; China	Kim Tae-ho; South Korea	Huang Junhua; Macau
Taijiquan	Zhang Zhenxing; China	Kim Dong-yeong; South Korea	Kendai Sekiya; Japan
Daoshu+Gunshu	Jia Rui; Macau	Cho Seung-jae; South Korea	Hang Cheng Chung; Macau
Jianshu+Qiangshu	Yaowen Zhang; China	Chu Chi Wai; Macau	Leung Ka Wai; Hong Kong
Duilian	Hong Kong; Cheuk Hei Leung; Cheng Chung Hang; Leung Ka Wai	South Korea; Jo Kye-yong; Cho Seung-jae; Kim Tae-ho	Macau; Jia Rui; Huang Junhua

=== Women ===
Event	Gold	Silver	Bronze
Changquan	Sun Xiaomei; China	Zheng Tianhui; Hong Kong	Yu Chih-hsuan; Chinese Taipei
Nanquan	Erika Kojima; Japan	Lin Chih-yu; Chinese Taipei	Lim Sung-eun; South Korea
Taijiquan	Yu Mengmeng; China	Ai Uchida; Japan	Ho Si Hang; Macau
Daoshu+Gunshu	Geng Xiaoling; Hong Kong	Sun Xiaomei; China	Sou Cho Man; Macau
Jianshu+Qiangshu	Lee Wen-jung; Chinese Taipei	Keiko Yamaguchi; Japan	Zheng Tianhui; Hong Kong
Duilian	China; Zhao Longlong; He Xin	Hong Kong; Yuen Ka Ying; Zheng Tianhui; Fung Wing See	Macau; Tan Dongmei; Ho Si Hang; Li Yi
