= 2009 East Asian Games opening ceremony =

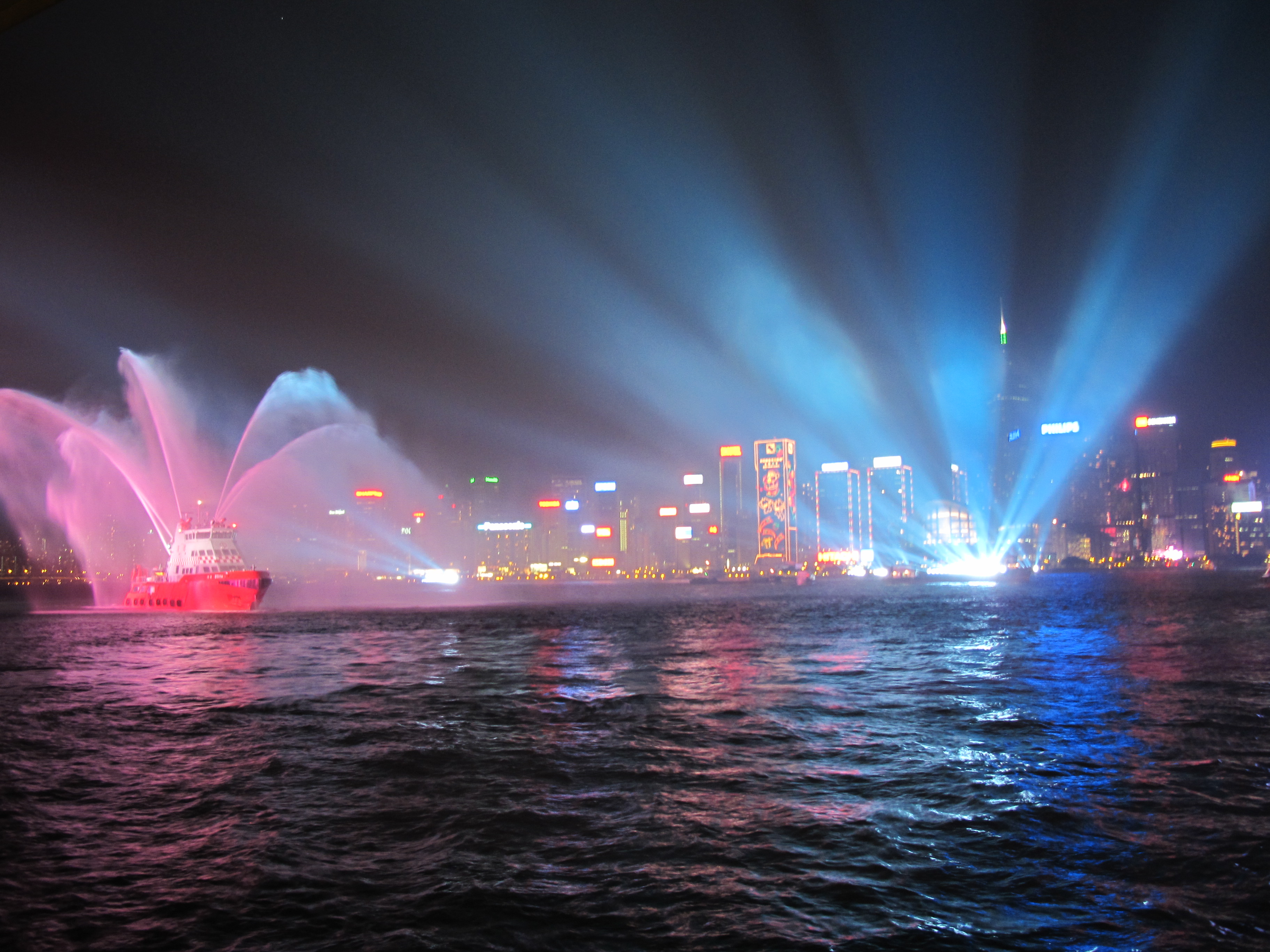
Rehearsal of the Opening ceremony lights and fountains

The 2009 East Asian Games opening ceremony was held on 5 December 2009 at Tsim Sha Tsui, Hong Kong. The opening began at 8 p.m. at the Hong Kong Cultural Centre on a floating stage set up at Victoria Harbour. The production team was the same one that ran the 2008 Beijing Olympics opening ceremony. The ceremony involved 44 decorated vessels and cost HK$40 million (about US$5 million) to stage, lasting 90 minutes. Tickets to the opening ceremony was sold at HK$1000.

== Leader entrances ==
Special guest China's state councillor Liu Yandong was the first introduced. Chief executive of Hong Kong Donald Tsang, IOC President Jacques Rogge and East Asian Games president Timothy Fok were then introduced. They were seated among a panel of VIPs.

== Fireworks & entrances ==
Fireworks at the harbour began. Then Ode to the Motherland was played by the Police band and sung by choir of schoolchildren, while the Hong Kong Police Force parade in, then with British-style drills and English commands. Only two people raising the flag for each staff, rather than three each today. The flags were brought in folded, rather than rolled up today. The Regional flag of Hong Kong and the National flag of China were then raised to the national anthem March of the Volunteers. An orchestral piece of the theme song "Be the Legend" (創造傳奇) was played. Then the different countries entered via the harbour by boat accompanied by fireworks in the background. They entered according to English alphabetical order of their country's name.

== Performances ==
The artistic portion was split into four different parts.

=== Part 1 ===
The "Fishing lights on Fragrant waters" (香江漁火) took place on a floating stage with colourful night view with dance scene. It played the popular Hong Kong song "Below the Lion Rock (獅子山下). The song was performed many years ago by Cantopop singer Roman Tam. These are accompanied by sailboat and wave dances. This portion represents Hong Kong history with the junk sailing ships.

=== Part 2 ===
The (活力都會) part focused on a more modern Hong Kong. On the floating stage Joey Yung sang the song "Run Forward" (跑步機上). She was accompanied by dancers. The junk boats then used a more modern lighting. This part ended with five firework shots display.

=== Part 3 ===
The "Blessings for Hong Kong" (祝福香港) section was then opened up by Andy Lau. He sings "If One Day" (如果有一天) accompanied by violin virtuoso Li Chuan Yun. This part also ended with five firework shots.

=== Part 4 ===
The "Conglomeration of the Nine Dragons" (九龍匯聚) section celebrated the nine participating countries. Usually nine dragons represented Kowloon. Alan Tam performs the song You are the Legend. He was accompanied by Hong Kong students. Afterwards the 10 male, 14 female group Phoenix music troupe (鳳樂團) performed the "Nine nation drum beats" (九國鼓樂). Flag waving performers then came out.

=== National flag bearers ===
The athletes of the nine nations then came out onto the stage. The host region Hong Kong marched last. Guam entered as the penultimate region, as it was a member of the Oceania National Olympic Committees and an invited team. Other countries and regions entered in English alphabetical order of their Olympic Council of Asia (OCA) designated names. Whilst most countries entered under their short names, a few entered under more formal or alternative names, sometimes due to political disputes. Taiwan (Republic of China) entered with the compromised name and flag of "Chinese Taipei" under T so that they did not enter together with conflicting "China", which entered under C. Similarly, South Korea entered as "Korea" under K while North Korea entered as "Democratic People's Republic of Korea" (shortened as DPR Korea on the placard).

Order	Nation	Chinese name	Jyutping	Flag bearer	Sport
1	China (CHN)	中國	zung1 gwok3	Liu Zige (劉子歌)	Swimming
2	North Korea (PRK)	朝鮮	ciu4 sin1	Pak Keum-chol (朴金哲)	Weightlifting
3	Japan (JPN)	日本	jat6 bun2	Hiromi Miyake	Weightlifting
4	South Korea (KOR)	韓國	hon4 gwok3	Park Jun-bum	Volleyball
5	Macau (MAC)	中國澳門	zung1 gwok3 ou3 mun4	Choi Wai-git (蔡偉傑)	Volleyball
6	Mongolia (MGL)	蒙古	mung4 gu2	Tserenjankharyn Sharavjamts (沙拉占士)	Basketball
7	Chinese Taipei (TPE)	中華台北	zung1 waa4 toi4 bak1	Hung Kun-yi (洪焜毅)	Bowling
8	Guam (GUM)	關島	gwaan1 dou2	Arman Burgos	Table tennis
9	Hong Kong (HKG)	中國香港	zung1 gwok3 hoeng1 gong2	Steven Wong (王史提芬)	Cycling

=== Speech ===
Donald Tsang then gave a speech. It was the first large scale international games ever hosted in Hong Kong. It was also the largest East Asian Games. Timothy Fok then followed up with a speech. They both gave their speech first in English, then in Cantonese. State Councillor Liu Yandong then opened the games up with a statement in Mandarin. The firework displays began.

=== Games flag bearer ===
The flag of East Asian Games enters the stage carried by eight Hong Kong athletes.

Flag bearer	Description
Kim Ho (何劍暉)	sailor
Chung Hoi-yuk (鐘海玉)	badminton
Li Fai (李暉)	wushu
Chan Mei-ling (陳美玲)	Judo fighter
Wong Fai (王輝)	shooter
Sherry Tsai (蔡曉慧)	swimmer
Wu Siu-hong (胡兆康)	bowler
Wun Gin-yi (温建儀)	

The flag was then raised and the East Asian Games song was played. Hong Kong table tennis player Li Ching (李靜) took the athlete's oath. Gary Au Yeung Kwok-kei (歐楊國棋) then took the referee's oath. Lee Lai Shan and Wong Kam-po arrived with the torch from the 2009 East Asian Games torch relay. They joined Cheung King Wai, Hannah Wilson and Chan Hei-man (陳晞文). They all lighted the cauldron.

=== Fireworks ===
Final major firework display was accompanied by live singing from the float performed by artists such as Yumiko Cheng, Nicholas Tse, Vincy Chan, Priscilla Chan. The ceremony finished with "You are the Legend".

== See also ==
- 2008 Summer Olympics opening ceremony
- 2009 East Asian Games torch relay
- 2009 East Asian Games closing ceremony
