= 2009 East Asian Games torch relay =

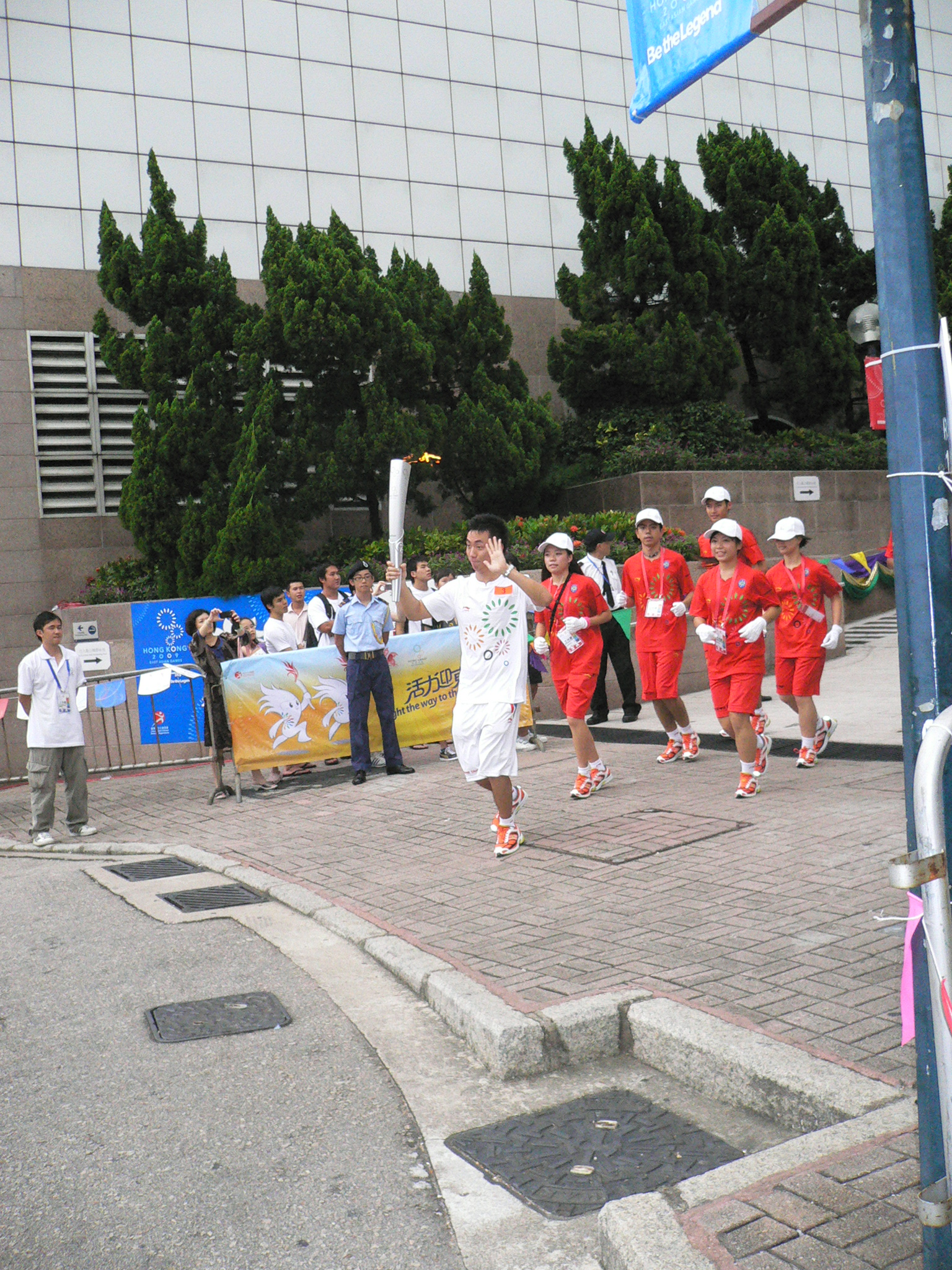
Wu Siu-hong running with the torch

The 2009 East Asian Games torch relay was the torch relay portion prior to the opening of the East Asian Games. It took place on 29 August 2009 on the 100th day countdown to the games. About 500 local schools held torch relay activities from September 2009 to November 2009 prior to the start of the games in December. The torch pipe was designed by HK designer Kan Tai-keung (靳埭強). The relay held the theme "Light the way to the EAG".

== Torch ==
The torch is a curvy cylinder with a square top and round bottom. It resembles the horn of an ox as 2009 is the year of the Ox. They create the patterns of "Lucky Clouds" to put forward the concept of yin and yang. This also convey the message that Hong Kong is a place where the Chinese and Western cultures meet.

== Torch relay route ==
The relay point begins at Kowloon Park that travels to Austin Road and Nathan Road. Then it turns to Salisbury Road and Tsim Sha Tsui East before reaching the Avenue of Stars and Kowloon Public Pier. The bearers then cross Victoria Harbour by water and reach Expo drive east on the other side of the harbour. It continues to Harbour Road before going to Expo drive and finish at the Golden Bauhinia Square with the last torch bearer.

== Torchbearers ==
There were a total of 65 torchbearers. The route was divided by 3 sections.

=== Section 1 ===
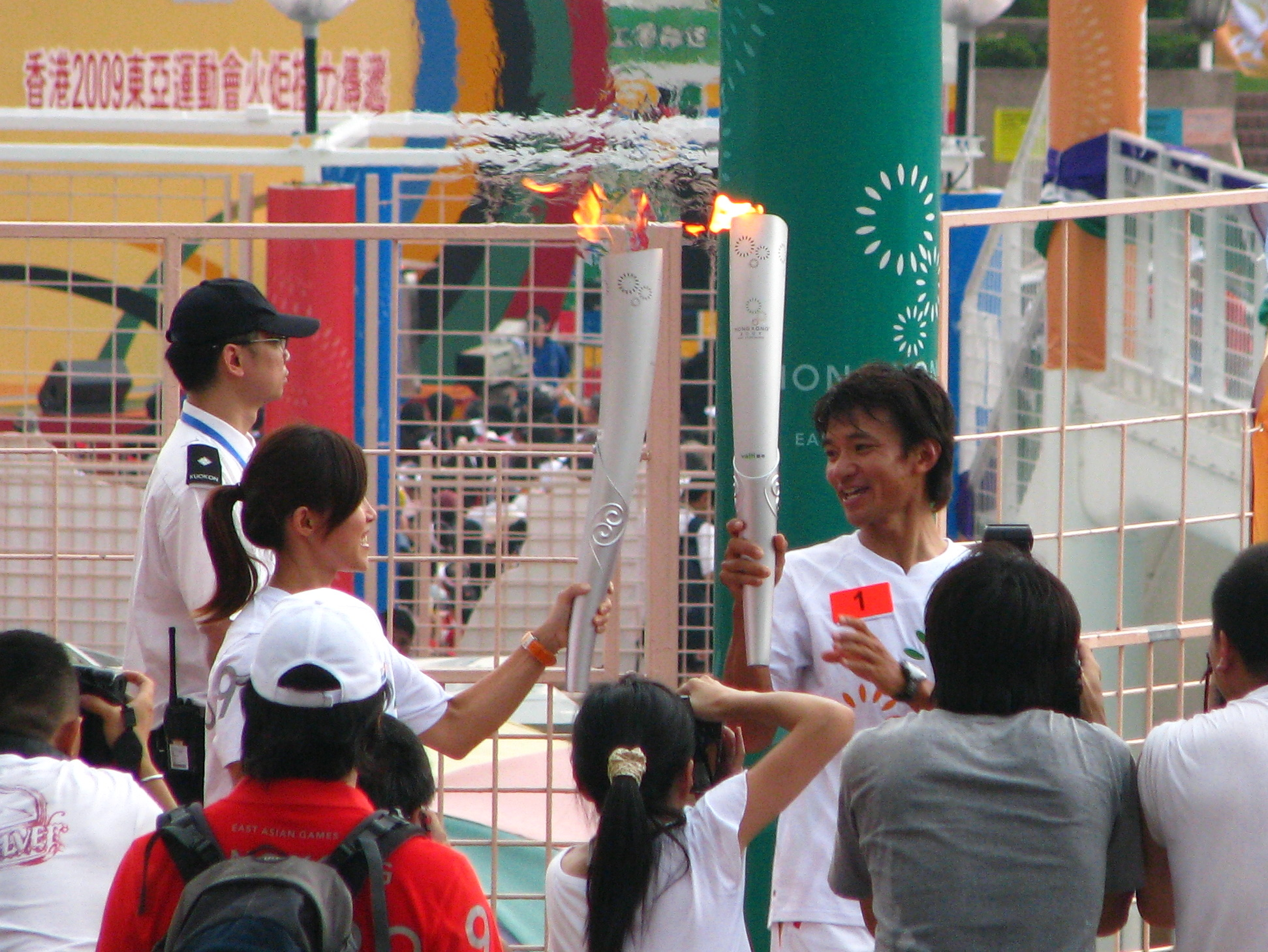
Wong Kam-po handing off to Sherry Tsai

Torchbearer	Description
Wong Kam-po (黃金寶)	biker
Sherry Tsai (蔡曉慧)	swimmer
Wu Siu-hong (胡兆康)	bowler
Lee Wai-lim (李威廉)	football player
Lam Po Kuen (林寶權)	tennis player
Matthew Lee Chadwick (蔡明紹)	equestrian
Tang Yik-chun (鄧亦峻)	
Li Xiao-peng (李小鵬)	gymnast
Wang Chen (王晨)	badminton player
Eason Chan (陳奕迅)	singer
Zhou Mi (周蜜)	badminton player
Richie Ren (任賢齊)	singer
Poon Chi-ho (潘志豪)	basketball player
Dadawa (朱哲琴)	singer
Joey Yung (容祖兒)	singer
Cheung Hoi-wah (蔣凱華)	
Chae Yeon (蔡妍)	singer
Helen Liu Yee-man (廖伊敏)	
Fung Kwok-wai (馮國威)	
Chan Yee-ki (陳綺琪)	
Fung Wing-see (馮詠施)	
Ken Chu Ting-kin (朱鼎健)	
Samuel Yu Sum-yee (余心怡)	biker
Evelyn Choi (蔡穎恩)	model
Yu Wei-li (於偉麗)	
Chun Chun-ki (秦駿祺)	
Fiona Ma (馬希彤)	swimmer
Marco Kwok Ho-ting (郭灝霆)	biker
Ng Sum-chun (吳森雋)	
Mina Ng Min-ning (吳敏寧)	
Wong Wing-shan (黃泳珊)	
Asghar Ali	
Law Yiu-tung (羅耀彤)	
Adrian Ma Wai-hing (馬偉卿)	
Tie Yana (帖雅娜)	ping pong player
Chan Zheng-ming (陳徵明)	
Chan Mei-ling (陳美玲)	
Fan Chun-yip (范俊業)	football player
Lo Kwan-yee (盧均宜)	football player
Wong Fai (王輝)	shooter
Hacken Lee (李克勤)	singer
Li Ching (李靜)	ping pong player

=== Section 2 ===
Torchbearer	Description
Jeff Wong Chun-kiu (王俊喬)	
Leung Ya-yuan (梁雅媛)	
Au Ka-yee (區嘉儀)	
Chiang Yun-kuen (蔣潤權)	
Yau Ka-lam (邱嘉琳)	
Yeung Ying-kwan (楊英君)	
Jiang Hua-jun (姜華珺)	ping pong player
John Hui Kin-yip (許建業)	

=== Section 3 ===
Torchbearer	Description
Chiu Chung-hei (趙頌熙)	
Choi Tat-ming (蔡達明)	
Evelyn Ho Yuk-ling (何玉玲)	
Alan Tam (譚詠麟)	singer
Yeung Sau-mei (楊秀美)	volleyball player
Cheng Siu-wai (鄭少偉)	football player
Rebecca Chiu (趙詠賢)	squash player
Tsui Choi-ho (徐志豪)	
Tang Hon-sing (鄧漢昇)	
Andres Tung (董卓軒)	
Yu Wai-ting (于蕙婷)	
Yung Kam-wah (翁金驊)	
Annie Au Wing-chi (歐詠芝)	
Ko Lai-chak (高禮澤)	ping pong player
Lee Lai-shan (李麗珊)	surfer, gold medalist

== See also ==
- 2009 East Asian Games opening ceremony
- 2008 Summer Olympics torch relay
- 2008 Summer Olympics torch relay route
- 2008 Summer Paralympics torch relay
