= North Korea at the 2009 East Asian Games =

- IOC code: PRK
- NOC: Olympic Committee of the Democratic People's Republic of Korea

in Hong Kong
- Flag bearer: Pak Keum-chol
- Medals Ranked 7th: Gold 6 Silver 8 Bronze 11 Total 25

East Asian Games appearances
- 1993; 1997–2001; 2005; 2009; 2013

North Korea competed in the 2009 East Asian Games held in Hong Kong from December 5, 2009, to December 13, 2009. North Korea finished seventh on the medal table with 6 gold medals.

== Medalists ==
=== Gold ===
- Jong Chun-mi Dec 8 2009 Weightlifting 58 kg Women
- Pak Hyon-Suk Dec 9 2009 Weightlifting 63 kg Women
- Kim Kum-sok Dec 8 2009 Weightlifting 69 kg Men
- Kim Un-guk Dec 7 2009 Weightlifting 62 kg Men

=== Silver ===
- Paek Un-Hui Dec 8 2009 Weightlifting 53 kg Women

=== Bronze ===
- Jo Yong-suk Shooting 10m Air Pistol Women
- Pang Kum Chol Dec 9 2009 Weightlifting 77 kg Men
- O Jong-ae Dec 8 2009 Weightlifting 58 kg Women
- Cha Kum-Chol Dec 7 2009 Weightlifting 62 kg Men
- Ryang Chun-hwa Dec 7 2009 Weightlifting 48 kg Women

== Events ==
=== Judo ===
==== Gold ====
- Kim Kyong-jin Dec 13 2009 Judo -60 kg Men

==== Silver ====
- Ri Chol-Ryong Dec 13 2009 Judo -66 kg Men
- Pak Song-il Dec 12 2009 Judo -90 kg Men
- Pak Ok-Song Dec 13 2009 Judo -48 kg Women
- Rim Yun-Hui Dec 13 2009 Judo -57 kg Women

==== Bronze ====
- Kim Chol-su Dec 13 2009 Judo -73 kg Men
- Won Ok-im Dec 12 2009 Judo -63 kg Women
- Hyon Jong Hui Dec 12 2009 Judo -70 kg Women

== Football ==
Team	Pld	W	D	L	GF	GA	GD	Pts
Japan	2	2	0	0	7	1	6	6
North Korea	2	1	0	1	9	2	7	3
Macau	2	0	0	2	0	13	-13	0

2 December 2009
UTC+8 18:00

Japan	2 – 1	North Korea
Otsuka 30'; Suzuki 59'	Report by EAG; Report by HKFA	Choe Chol-Man 52'

Siu Sai Wan Sports Ground, Hong Kong
Attendance: 4,100
Referee: Sukhbir Singh (Singapore)
10 December 2009
UTC+8 20:00

Hong Kong	1 – 1 (a.e.t.)	North Korea
Chan Wai Ho 44'	Report by EAG; Report by HKFA	Pak Kwang-Ryong 85'
Penalties
Au Yeung Yiu Chung (penalty scored); Chan Wai Ho (penalty scored); Lee Chi Ho (penalty scored); Yuen Kin Man (penalty scored)	4 – 2	(penalty scored) Pak Song-Chol; (penalty missed) Ri Kwang-Hyok; (penalty scored) Jon Kwang-Ik; (penalty missed) Kim Kwang-Hyok

Hong Kong Stadium, Hong Kong
Attendance: 9,482
Referee: Sgt Win Cho (Myanmar)
12 December 2009
UTC+8 13:00

South Korea	1 – 1	North Korea
Go Min-Gi 24'	Report by EAG; Report by HKFA	Pak Song-Chol 52'
Penalties
Go Min-Gi (penalty scored); Woo Choo-Young (penalty scored); Jung Jae-Suk (penalty scored); Lee Jea-Young (penalty scored)	4 – 2	(penalty scored) Choe Myong-Ho; (penalty scored) Pak Song-Chol; (penalty missed) Jon Kwang-Ik; (penalty missed) Kim Kuk-Jin

Hong Kong Stadium, Hong Kong
Attendance: 28,246
Referee: Sukhbir Singh (Singapore)

== See also ==
- North Korea at the Asian Games
- North Korea at the Olympics
- Sport in North Korea
