= Yu Delu =

Chinese snooker player (born 1987)

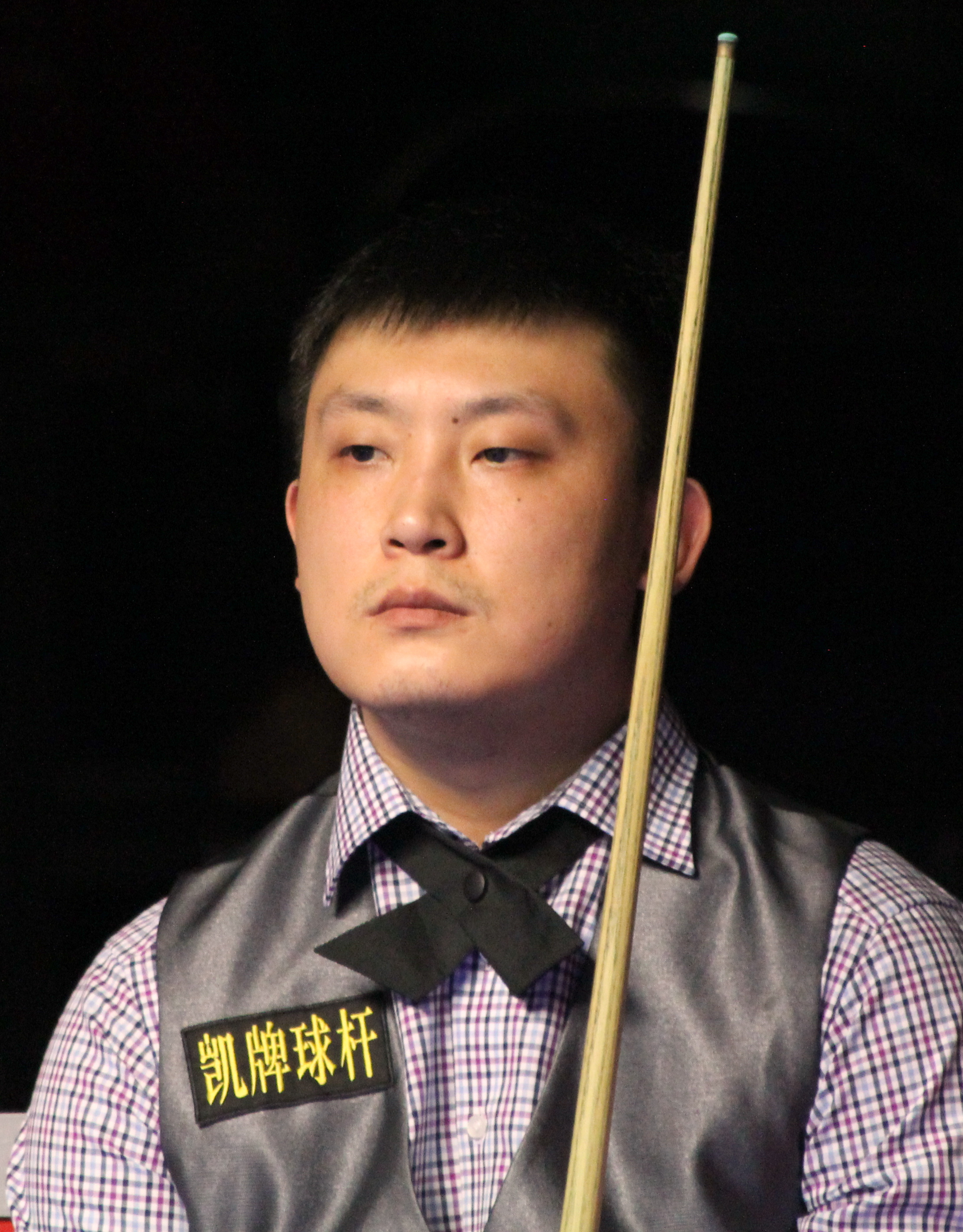
- Paul Hunter Classic 2016

Personal information
- Born: October 11, 1987 (age 39) Taiyuan, Shanxi, China

Sport
- Country: China
- Sport: Snooker
- Professional: 2011–2018
- Highest ranking: 43 (May 2018)
- Best ranking finish: Semi-final (x1)
Medal record
Representing China
Men's snooker
East Asian Games
Silver medal – second place	2009 Hong Kong	Singles
Bronze medal – third place	2009 Hong Kong	Team
Men's six-red snooker
East Asian Games
Gold medal – first place	2009 Hong Kong	Singles

Yu Delu (Chinese: 于德陆; born 11 October 1987) is a former professional snooker player from the People's Republic of China. He is currently serving a 10-year and 9-month ban for match-fixing from 25 May 2018 until 24 February 2029. The ban was announced on 1 December 2018 after the result of a lengthy investigation.

== Career ==
=== Early career ===
Yu made his first appearance at the China Open as a wild card in 2006. He defeated Andrew Norman, before losing to Graeme Dott in the last 32. He was awarded a wild card for every China Open event between 2006 and 2011, and for the first three Shanghai Masters events in 2007, 2008 and 2009.

He recorded a maximum break during a China Snooker Professional Tour event in ZhengZhou against Jin Long on 20 September 2009. This made him the first person to score a 147 on the China Professional Tour. However, it is not recorded by World Snooker Association.

=== Debut season ===
He was awarded a place on the 2011–12 professional Main Tour as a wildcard by World Snooker. In Yu's first ranking event qualifier, the Australian Goldfields Open he beat Michael White 5–4, Joe Swail 5–1 and Joe Jogia 5–2 before losing in the final qualifying round 5–0 to Ryan Day. Later in the season, he came through three qualifying matches to reach the wild-card round of the German Masters where he beat Chris Norbury 5–3. The result meant that he played in the main draw of a ranking event outside of China for the first time. Yu drew compatriot Ding Junhui in the last 32 and pulled off the result of his career to date as he won the first three frames before once again closing out the match 5–3. He couldn't replicate his form in the last 16, however, as he was beaten 2–5 by Stephen Lee.

Yu reached the final qualifying round in three of the last four ranking events, losing to Andrew Higginson in the World Open and to seven-time world champion Stephen Hendry in both the China Open and World Championship. He was therefore one of the Scot's last opponents before his retirement.

Yu also had a good season in the minor-ranking Players Tour Championship series as he played in 11 of the 12 events, picking up two quarter-finals and two last 16 finishes to be placed 34th on the PTC Order of Merit. He finished his debut season ranked world number 58, inside the top 64 who guarantee their places for the 2012–13 season. Yu was also the highest ranked out of all the new players on the tour.

=== 2012/2013 season ===
Yu had a disappointing 2012/2013 season as he could not qualify for any of the ranking events. He played in nine of the ten Players Tour Championship during the year, with his best finishes being three last 32 defeats to see him placed 63rd on the Order of Merit. Yu did have an upturn in form in World Championship Qualifying, by defeating Ian Burns 10–2 and Jamie Burnett 10–6. His break of 140 against Burnett was the joint highest of his career to date and the second highest of the qualifying tournament. Yu faced Mark King, just one match away from reaching the Crucible for the first time, and led 8–6 and 9–8, but lost the 18th frame on the colours and the deciding frame to be defeated 9–10. His ranking increased 11 places during the year to end it at world number 47.

=== 2013/2014 season ===
Yu lost in the first round of both the Indian Open and Shanghai Masters, before winning his first match in a ranking event at the UK Championship with a 6–3 victory over David Grace. His second round match against Matthew Stevens went into a deciding frame which lasted 40 minutes and hinged on a safety battle that Stevens won on the final pink. Yu played in all four of the Asian Tour events and lost 4–1 to Alan McManus in the quarter-finals of the Yixing Open, with his only frame coming courtesy of a 117 break. At the final event, the Dongguan Open, Yu advanced to the semi-finals where he was beaten 4–2 by Liang Wenbo. His results saw him finish ninth on the Asian Order of Merit to claim the final spot in the Players Tour Championship Finals. There, he exacted revenge over Wenbo by winning their first round clash 4–2. He recorded the best result of his career to date in the next round by restricting reigning world champion Ronnie O'Sullivan to just two points from 3–2 down to win 4–3. In Yu's first ranking event quarter-final of his career, he was unable to recapture his prior form and was beaten 4–1 by Barry Hawkins. Yu continued his recent good play into the China Open with wins against Duane Jones and James Wattana to face Neil Robertson in the third round. The match lasted four hours with Yu just being edged out 5–4.

=== 2014/2015 season ===
Yu lost in the quarter-finals of the Yixing Open for the second year in a row, this time 4–1 to Ryan Day. He qualified for the Wuxi Classic but was beaten 5–4 by Yan Bingtao in the wildcard round, and lost 6–1 to Shaun Murphy in the opening round of the International Championship. Yu recorded his first win of the year at a ranking event by knocking out Oliver Lines 6–2 in the UK Championship and, though he led 3–0, he would be beaten 6–4 by Stephen Maguire in the second round. He received a bye through to the second round of the Welsh Open and was thrashed 4–0 by Joe Perry. In Yu's deciding frame of his first round match at the Indian Open he led Ben Woollaston 67–0, before the Englishman made a 67 break and won the respotted black. Yu closed out the season with a 5–3 loss to John Higgins in the first round of the China Open and reached the final round of World Championship qualifying where he was defeated 10–7 by Graeme Dott.

=== 2015/2016 season ===
A 6–1 victory over Chris Melling saw Yu qualify for the International Championship and he knocked out reigning world champion Stuart Bingham 6–2 in the first round. He was edged out 6–5 by Ben Woollaston in the next round. Another second round exit followed at the UK Championship, 6–0 at the hands of Marco Fu. A trio of deciding frame victories over Ian Glover, Ricky Walden and Dechawat Poomjaeng saw Yu reach the last 16 of the Welsh Open, his deepest run a ranking event this season, and he lost 4–1 to Ronnie O'Sullivan. In the first round of the China Open Yu lost 5–2 to Fu and he fell at the first hurdle in World Championship qualifying 10–9 to Paul Davison. He just held on to his top 64 ranking and therefore his tour place as he was 63rd in the world.

=== 2016/2017 season ===
Yu could not win a first round match in the 2016–17 season until the ninth event when he beat Ding Junhui 4–2 at the Northern Ireland Open, before losing 4–1 to Robbie Williams. He reached the third round of the UK Championship by defeating Nigel Bond 6–3 and Stuart Bingham 6–4, but lost 6–1 to Luca Brecel. At the Scottish Open, Yu reached the semi-finals for the first time in his career in a ranking tournament, beating Josh Boileau, Mark Joyce, Daniel Wells, Sean O'Sullivan and Liang Wenbo, all in final frame deciders. He was defeated by Marco Fu, the eventual winner of the tournament, 6–1 in the semi-finals. Yu was eliminated 5–3 by Michael White in the first round of the China Open and got through to the final World Championship qualifying round, but lost 10–7 to Martin Gould.

=== 2018/2019 season ===
On 25 May 2018, he was suspended from the tour for suspected match fixing. After a lengthy investigation, Yu was found guilty of match fixing and received a ban for 10 years and 9 months on 1 December 2018.

== Performance and rankings timeline ==
Tournaments	2005/ 06	2006/ 07	2007/ 08	2008/ 09	2009/ 10	2010/ 11	2011/ 12	2012/ 13	2013/ 14	2014/ 15	2015/ 16	2016/ 17	2017/ 18	2018/ 19
Rankings (Note: From the 2010/2011 season it shows the ranking at the beginning of the season.)	(Note: He was an amateur.)						(Note: New players on the Main Tour don't have a ranking.)	58	47	52	52	63	47	43
Ranking tournaments
Riga Masters (Note: The event was called the Riga Open (2014/2015–2015/2016))	Tournament Not Held									MR		LQ	WD	A
World Open (Note: The event was called the Grand Prix (2005/2006–2009/2010), the World Open (2010/2011) and the Haikou World Open (2011/2012–2013/2014))	A	A	A	A	A	A	LQ	LQ	1R	Not Held		WD	1R	A
Paul Hunter Classic (Note: The event was called the Fürth German Open (2005/2006–2006/2007))	Pro-am Event					Minor-Ranking Event						1R	2R	A
China Championship	Tournament Not Held											NR	LQ	A
European Masters	Tournament Not Held											1R	LQ	A
English Open	Tournament Not Held											1R	1R	A
International Championship	Tournament Not Held							LQ	LQ	1R	2R	LQ	1R	A
Northern Ireland Open	Tournament Not Held											2R	2R	A
UK Championship	A	A	A	A	A	A	LQ	LQ	2R	2R	2R	3R	2R	A
Scottish Open	Tournament Not Held							MR	Not Held			SF	2R	A
German Masters	Tournament Not Held					A	2R	LQ	LQ	LQ	LQ	LQ	1R	A
World Grand Prix	Tournament Not Held									NR	DNQ	1R	DNQ	DNQ
Welsh Open	A	A	A	A	A	A	LQ	LQ	1R	2R	4R	1R	QF	A
Shoot-Out	Tournament Not Held					Non-Ranking Event						A	A	A
Indian Open	Tournament Not Held								WD	1R	NH	LQ	2R	A
Players Championship (Note: The event was called the Players Tour Championship Grand Finals (2010/2011–2012/2013))	Tournament Not Held					A	DNQ	DNQ	QF	DNQ	DNQ	DNQ	DNQ	DNQ
Gibraltar Open	Tournament Not Held										MR	A	4R	A
Tour Championship	Tournament Not Held													DNQ
China Open	1R	1R	WR	1R	WR	WR	LQ	LQ	3R	1R	1R	1R	LQ	A
World Championship	A	A	A	A	A	A	LQ	LQ	LQ	LQ	LQ	LQ	LQ	A
Non-ranking tournaments
Six-red World Championship (Note: The event was called the Six-red Snooker International (2008/2009) and the Six-red World Grand Prix (2009/2010))	Not Held			A	A	RR	NH	A	A	A	A	A	A	A
Haining Open	Tournament Not Held									MR		2R	SF	A
Former ranking tournaments
Wuxi Classic (Note: The event was called the Jiangsu Classic (2008/2009–2009/2010))	Not Held			Non-Ranking Event				LQ	1R	WR	Tournament Not Held			
Australian Goldfields Open	Tournament Not Held						LQ	LQ	LQ	LQ	A	Not Held		
Shanghai Masters	Not Held		1R	WR	WR	A	LQ	LQ	1R	LQ	LQ	LQ	2R	NR
Former non-ranking tournaments
Hainan Classic	Tournament Not Held					RR	Tournament Not Held							
Wuxi Classic	Not Held			A	A	1R	QF	Ranking Event			Tournament Not Held			
Shoot-Out	Tournament Not held					A	A	1R	A	A	1R	Ranking Event		

Performance Table Legend
LQ	lost in the qualifying draw	#R	lost in the early rounds of the tournament (WR = Wildcard round, RR = Round robin)	QF	lost in the quarter-finals
SF	lost in the semi-finals	F	lost in the final	W	won the tournament
DNQ	did not qualify for the tournament	A	did not participate in the tournament	WD	withdrew from the tournament

NH / Not Held	means an event was not held.
NR / Non-Ranking Event	means an event is/was no longer a ranking event.
R / Ranking Event	means an event is/was a ranking event.
MR / Minor-Ranking Event	means an event is/was a minor-ranking event.
