= Park Seon-kwan =

South Korean swimmer (born 1991)

Personal information
- Nationality: South Korea
- Born: January 16, 1991 (age 35) Gyeonggi-do, South Korea
- Height: 1.83 m (6 ft 0 in)
- Weight: 71 kg (157 lb)

Korean name
- Hangul: 박선관
- RR: Bak Seongwan
- MR: Pak Sŏn'gwan

Sport
- Sport: Swimming
- Strokes: Freestyle, backstroke
- College team: Korea National Sports University
Medal record
Men's swimming
Representing South Korea
Asian Games
Bronze medal – third place	2010 Guangzhou	4×100 m freestyle
East Asian Games
Silver medal – second place	2009 Hong Kong	100 m backstroke
Silver medal – second place	2009 Hong Kong	200 m backstroke

Park Seon-kwan (Korean: 박선관; born January 16, 1991, in Gyeonggi-do) is a South Korean swimmer, who specialized in backstroke events. He won a bronze medal, as a member of the South Korean swimming team, in the 400 m freestyle relay at the 2010 Asian Games in Guangzhou, China. He also collected two silver medals in the 100 and 200 m backstroke at the 2009 East Asian Games in Hong Kong, China. Park is a member of the swimming team at Korea National Sports University in Seoul.

Park qualified for the men's 100 m backstroke at the 2012 Summer Olympics in London, by clearing a FINA B-standard entry time of 55.39 at the FINA World Championships in Shanghai, China. He challenged seven other swimmers in the second heat, including Olympic veterans Omar Pinzón of Colombia and former bronze medalist George Bovell of Trinidad and Tobago. Park edged out Russian-born swimmer Alexandr Tarabrin of Kazakhstan to take a fifth spot by four hundredths of a second (0.04), with a time of 55.51 seconds. Park failed to advance into the semifinals, as he placed thirty-sixth overall in the preliminary heats.
