= Park Jung-jin =

South Korean baseball player (born 1976)

Hanwha Eagles – No. 17
- Relief pitcher
- Born: May 27, 1976 (age 49)
- Bats: Left Throws: Left

KBO debut
- 1999, for the Hanwha Eagles

KBO statistics (through 2016 season)
- Win–loss record: 42–41
- Earned run average: 4.59
- Saves: 34
- Strikeouts: 671
- Stats at Baseball Reference

Teams
- As player: Hanwha Eagles (1999–2018); As coach: Hanwha Eagles (2020–present)

Park Jung-jin (Korean: 박정진; Hanja: 朴政鎭; born May 27, 1976 in Cheongju, Chungcheongbuk-do) is a South Korean left-handed relief pitcher who plays for the Hanwha Eagles in the Korea Professional Baseball.

== Amateur career ==
In his last season at Sekwang High School in 1994, Park was called up as a member of the South Korean national U-18 baseball team and competed in the World Junior Baseball Championship held in Brandon, Manitoba. Park led Team Korea to win its second world junior championship as one of the key figures in the team's pitching rotation alongside Lee Seung-Yeop and Kim Sun-Woo.

Park was generally expected to be a top pick in the 1995 KBO draft. However, he decided to withdraw from the draft, opting to go to college instead. After graduation from high school in 1995, Park enrolled in Yonsei University. During his four collegiate years, he was regularly called up to the South Korean national team and showed promising performances in the major international competitions .

=== Notable international careers ===
Year	Venue	Competition	Team
1994	Canada	World Junior Baseball Championship	Gold medal
1995	Cuba	Intecontinental Cup	5th
1997	Japan	Asian Baseball Championship	Gold medal
1998	Italy	Baseball World Cup	Silver medal

== Professional career ==
Park was drafted by the Hanwha Eagles in the first round of the 1999 KBO Draft. He join the team to high expectations, where many expected him to be the future face of the Eagles. However, Park never took off the way he was expected to in the team, having a disappointing 8.03 ERA in his rookie season and going 5-5 with a 6.37 ERA from 2000 to 2002. In 2003, he pitched over 100 innings (100.1) and posted 6 wins, 3 saves and 11 holds with a career-low 4.31 ERA, taking a role as a utility pitcher. However, in 2004, Park's form dipped again with only 4 holds and a 5.51 ERA in 32.2 innings pitched.

Park left the Eagles after the 2004 season to enter mandatory military service. He came back to the team in 2008 but hardly seized an opportunity to pitch, spending most of his time in the farm league. After the 2009 season, a rumor surfaced that Park would be released by the Eagles as a free agent but he managed to survive final roster cuts and join spring training camp for the 2010 season.

As Australian closer Brad Thomas left the Eagles for the Detroit Tigers in MLB after the 2009 season, former Minnesota Twins setup man Julio DePaula became a closer for the 2010 Eagles, where manager Han Dae-Hwa intended to use Park as a left-handed specialist or long reliever. Park had a surprising ERA of 1.65 and posted 5 scoreless holds in May and June, appearing in 22 games out of the bullpen. In the middle of the 2010 season, injuries to a number of key starters crippled the Eagles and DePaula eventually moved from the bullpen to the starting rotation to fill the void, which opened the door for Park to move into the closer's role.
