= Kim Yu-yeon (swimmer) =

South Korean swimmer (born 1991)

Personal information
- Full name: Kim Yu-yeon
- National team: South Korea
- Born: 16 March 1991 (age 35) Seoul, South Korea
- Height: 1.60 m (5 ft 3 in)
- Weight: 54 kg (119 lb)

Sport
- Sport: Swimming
- Strokes: Backstroke
- College team: Ewha Womans University

Kim Yu-yeon (Korean: 김유연; born March 16, 1991) is a South Korean swimmer, who specialized in backstroke events. She represented her nation South Korea at the 2008 Summer Olympics, finishing among the top fifty swimmers in the sprint dorsal. Kim is also a graduate of Ewha Womans University.

Kim competed for the South Korean swimming team in the women's 100 m backstroke at the 2008 Summer Olympics in Beijing. Leading up to the Games, she topped the field with a new national mark of 1:03.82 to earn her selection to the Olympic team and register under the FINA B-cut (1:03.86) by four hundredths of a second at the Dong-A Swimming Championships in Ulsan. Rallying from last out of six entrants at the initial length in heat two, Kim fought off a sprint challenge from 13-year-old Kazakh swimmer Yekaterina Rudenko on the final stretch to touch the wall with a fifth-place time in 1:04.63. Kim failed to advance into the semifinals, as she placed forty-fourth overall in the prelims.
