= Kim Kwang-hoon (weightlifter) =

South Korean weightlifter (born 1982)

Medal record

Men's weightlifting

Representing South Korea

East Asian Games
Gold medal – first place	2009 Hong Kong	-77 kg

Asian Games
Bronze medal – third place	2010 Guangzhou	-85 kg

Kim Kwang-hoon (Korean: 김광훈; born January 31, 1982) is a South Korean weightlifter. His personal best is 369 kg.

At the 2004 Summer Olympics he ranked 10th in the 77 kg category, with a total of 350 kg.

At the 2007 World Weightlifting Championships he ranked 4th in the 77 kg category, with a total of 356 kg.

He competed in Weightlifting at the 2008 Summer Olympics in the 77 kg division finishing fourth with 355 kg.

At the 2009 East Asian Games he ranked 1st in the 77 kg category, with a total of 352 kg.

At the 2010 Asian Games he ranked 3rd in the 85 kg category, with a total of 369 kg.

He is 5 ft 5 in (1.65 m) tall and weighs 170 lb (77 kg).
