= Guam at the 2009 East Asian Games =

- IOC code: GUM
- NOC: Guam National Olympic Committee

in Hong Kong
- Flag bearer: Arman Burgos
- Medals Ranked 8th: Gold Silver Bronze 1 Total 1

East Asian Games appearances
- 1997; 2001; 2005; 2009; 2013

Guam competed in the 2009 East Asian Games which were held in Hong Kong from December 5, 2009 to December 13, 2009. Guam won a Bronze medal in Taekwondo.

== Medal list ==
=== Bronze ===
- Gilbert Anthony Carbullido Pascua, Taekwondo, 62kg Men

== See also ==
- Guam at the Olympics
