= An Yong-kwon =

South Korean weightlifter (born 1982)

Medal record

Men's weightlifting

Representing South Korea

World Championships
| Gold medal – first place | 2009 Goyang | +105 kg |

East Asian Games
| Gold medal – first place | 2009 Hong Kong | +105 kg |

An Yong-Kwon (Korean: 안용권; Hanja: 安容權; born October 15, 1982) is a South Korean weightlifter.

At the 2009 World Weightlifting Championships An won the gold medal in the +105 kg category.
