= Lee Hui-sol =

South Korean weightlifter (born 1989)

Personal information
- Born: 27 August 1989 (age 36)
- Height: 1.74 m (5 ft 8 1/2 in)
- Weight: 119 kg (262 lb)

Sport
- Country: South Korea
- Sport: Weightlifting
- Event: Women's +75 kg

Lee Hui-sol (born 27 August 1989) is a South Korean weightlifter. She competed in the women's +75 kg event at the 2016 Summer Olympics.
