= Kim Kum-sok =

North Korean weightlifter (born 1987)

- Hangul: 김금석
- RR: Gim Geumseok
- MR: Kim Kŭmsŏk

Kim Kum-sok (Korean: 김금석; born 19 August 1987) is a North Korean weightlifter, representing the Amnokgang Sports Team. He competed for North Korea at the 2012 Summer Olympics in the 69 kg weight division.
