= Mongolia at the 2009 East Asian Games =

- IOC code: MGL
- NOC: Mongolian National Olympic Committee

in Hong Kong
- Flag bearer: Tserenjankharyn Sharavjamts
- Medals Ranked 8th: Gold 0 Silver 4 Bronze 16 Total 20

East Asian Games appearances
- 1993; 1997; 2001; 2005; 2009; 2013

Mongolia competed in the 2009 East Asian Games held in Hong Kong from December 5, 2009, to December 13, 2009. Mongolia finished eighth on the medal table with 4 silver and 16 bronze medals.
