= China at the 2009 East Asian Games =

- IOC code: CHN
- NOC: Chinese Olympic Committee external link (in Chinese and English)

in Hong Kong
- Flag bearer: Liu Zige
- Medals Ranked 1st: Gold 113 Silver 73 Bronze 46 Total 232

East Asian Games appearances
- 1993; 1997; 2001; 2005; 2009; 2013

China competed in the 2009 East Asian Games held in Hong Kong from December 5, 2009 to December 13, 2009. China finished first with 113 gold medals.

== Medalists ==
=== Dancesport ===
==== Gold ====
- Fan Wenbo / Chen Shiyao Dancesport Latin - Samba
- Shen Hong / Liang Yujie Dancesport Standard - Waltz
- Shen Hong / Liang Yujie Dancesport Standard - Tango
- Fan Wenbo / Chen Shiyao Dancesport Latin - Rumba
- Lu Jie / Peng Ding Dancesport Standard - Slow Foxtrot
- Shi Lei / Zhang Baiyu Dancesport Latin - Paso Doble

==== Silver ====
- Shi Lei / Zhang Baiyu Dancesport Latin - Jive
- Lu Jie / Peng Ding Dancesport Standard - Viennese Waltz

=== Basketball ===
==== Gold ====
- China - Chen Xiaojia, Gao Song, Guan Xin, Huang Hongpin, Ji Xiao, Lu Wen, Shi Xiufeng, Wei Wei, Xu Ge, Yang Banban, Zhang Wei, Zhang Yu -Dec 11 2009 Basketball Women

== See also ==
- China at the Asian Games
- China at the Olympics
- Sports in China
