= Japan at the 2009 East Asian Games =

- IOC code: JPN
- NOC: Japanese Olympic Committee

in Hong Kong
- Flag bearer: Hiromi Miyake
- Medals Ranked 2nd: Gold 62 Silver 58 Bronze 70 Total 190

East Asian Games appearances
- 1993; 1997; 2001; 2005; 2009; 2013

Japan competed in the 2009 East Asian Games in Hong Kong from December 5, 2009 to December 13, 2009. Japan finished second on the medal table with 62 gold medals.
