= Chinese Taipei at the 2009 East Asian Games =

- IOC code: TPE
- NOC: Chinese Taipei Olympic Committee

in Hong Kong
- Flag bearer: Hung Kun Yi
- Medals Ranked 5th: Gold 8 Silver 34 Bronze 47 Total 89

East Asian Games appearances
- 1993; 1997; 2001; 2005; 2009; 2013

Chinese Taipei competed in the 2009 East Asian Games in Hong Kong from December 5, 2009 to December 13, 2009. Chinese Taipei finished fifth on the medal table with 8 gold medals.
