= Hong Kong at the 2009 East Asian Games =

- IOC code: HKG
- NOC: Sports Federation and Olympic Committee of Hong Kong, China

in Hong Kong
- Flag bearer: Steven Wong
- Medals Ranked 4th: Gold 26 Silver 31 Bronze 53 Total 110

East Asian Games appearances
- 1993; 1997; 2001; 2005; 2009; 2013

Hong Kong competed in the 2009 East Asian Games held in Hong Kong from 5 December 2009 to 13 December 2009. Hong Kong finished fourth on the medal table with 26 gold medals. Hong Kong won its first-ever international title in football at this event.
