= Macau at the 2009 East Asian Games =

- IOC code: MAC
- NOC: Macau Sports and Olympic Committee

in Hong Kong
- Flag bearer: Choi Wai-git
- Medals Ranked 6th: Gold 8 Silver 9 Bronze 12 Total 29

East Asian Games appearances
- 1993; 1997; 2001; 2005; 2009; 2013

Macau competed in the 2009 East Asian Games held in Hong Kong from December 5, 2009 to December 13, 2009. Macau finished sixth on the medal table with 8 gold medals.
