= All American Open =

Golf tournament

Tournament information
- Location: Niles, Illinois
- Established: 1941
- Course: Tam O'Shanter Country Club
- Par: 72
- Tour: PGA Tour
- Format: Stroke play
- Prize fund: US$25,000
- Month played: August
- Final year: 1957

Tournament record score
- Aggregate: 269 Byron Nelson (1945)
- To par: −19 as above

Final champion
- (Argentina) Roberto De Vicenzo
- Location in the United States Location in Illinois

The All American Open was a golf tournament on the PGA Tour in the 1940s and 1950s. It was played at the Tam O'Shanter Country Club in Niles, Illinois. It was run by George S. May and was originally known as the Tam O'Shanter National Open. From 1944 to 1946 it offered $10,000 winner's prize. The purses dropped to normal PGA Tour levels when May added the World Championship of Golf to the events played at Tam O'Shanter. May eventually added men's amateur, women's open, and women's amateur "All American" and "World Championship" events, all played at Tam O'Shanter over a two-week period in August. The tournaments were cancelled in 1958 in a dispute between May and the PGA over player entrance fees.

== Winners ==
Year	Winner	Score	To par	Margin of victory	Runner(s)-up	Winner's share ($)
All American Open
1957	(Argentina) Roberto De Vicenzo	273	−15	4 strokes	(United States) Gene Littler	3,500
1956	(United States) Dutch Harrison	278	−10	2 strokes	(United States) Earl Stewart	3,400
1955	(United States) Doug Ford	277	−11	3 strokes	(United States) Leo Biagetti	3,420
1954	(United States) Jerry Barber	277	−11	1 stroke	(United States) Gene Littler	3,420
1953	(United States) Lloyd Mangrum (3)	275	−13	3 strokes	(United States) Ted Kroll (United States) Sam Snead	3,420
1952	(United States) Sam Snead	271	−17	8 strokes	(United States) Tommy Bolt	3,420
1951	(United States) Cary Middlecoff	274	−14	2 strokes	(United States) Fred Hawkins	2,250
1950	(South Africa) Bobby Locke (2)	282	−6	Playoff	(United States) Lloyd Mangrum	2,500
1949	(United States) Lloyd Mangrum (2)	276	−12	1 stroke	(United States) Sam Snead	3,333
1948	(United States) Lloyd Mangrum	277	−11	2 strokes	(South Africa) Bobby Locke	5,000
1947	(South Africa) Bobby Locke	276	−12	Playoff	(United States) Ed Oliver	7,000
1946	(United States) Herman Barron	280	−8	1 stroke	(United States) Ellsworth Vines	10,500
1945	(United States) Byron Nelson (4)	269	−19	11 strokes	(United States) Ben Hogan (United States) Gene Sarazen	10,200
1944	(United States) Byron Nelson (3)	280	−8	5 strokes	(United States) Ed Dudley	10,100
1943	(United States) Jug McSpaden	282	−6	Playoff	(United States) Buck White	2,000
Tam O'Shanter National Open
1942	(United States) Byron Nelson (2)	280	−8	Playoff	(United States) Clayton Heafner	2,500
1941	(United States) Byron Nelson	278	−10	1 stroke	(United States) Leonard Dodson (United States) Ben Hogan	2,000

== See also ==
- All American Open (LPGA Tour)
