= 1946 Masters Tournament =

Tournament information
- Dates: April 4–7, 1946
- Location: Augusta, Georgia; 33.503°N 82.020°W
- Course: Augusta National Golf Club
- Organized by: Augusta National Golf Club
- Tour: PGA Tour

Statistics
- Par: 72
- Length: 6,800 yards (6,218 m)
- Field: 51 players
- Cut: None
- Prize fund: $10,000
- Winner's share: $2,500

Champion
- (United States) Herman Keiser
- 282 (−6)

Location map
- Location in the United States Location in Georgia

The 1946 Masters Tournament was the tenth Masters Tournament, held April 4–7 at Augusta National Golf Club in Augusta, Georgia. It was the first in four years because of World War II. The purse was $10,000, double that of the previous Masters in 1942, with a winner's share of $2,500.

Herman Keiser won his only major title, one stroke ahead of runner-up Ben Hogan, the tour's money leader. Keiser and Hogan both three-putted the slick 18th green on Sunday; Keiser from 20 feet (6 m), and a half-hour later Hogan from 15 feet (4.6 m).

Hogan won the PGA Championship four months later in August for his first major title at age 34. He later won the Masters in 1951 and 1953 and finished his career with nine wins in majors.

== Field ==
With only one major championship played in 1945, the invitation criteria were modified. Eight amateurs and eight professionals were selected by a committee in February and four further professionals were invited just before the event.

1. Masters champions

- Jimmy Demaret (7), Ralph Guldahl (2,7), Byron Nelson (2,6,7,8), Henry Picard (6,7), Horton Smith (7), Craig Wood (2,7)
- Gene Sarazen (2,4,6,7) did not play.

2. U.S. Open champions

- Billy Burke (7), Bobby Jones (3,4,5,7), Lawson Little (3,5,7)

3. U.S. Amateur champions

- Dick Chapman (a)

4. British Open champions

- Denny Shute (6,8)

5. British Amateur champions

- Charlie Yates (7,a)

6. PGA champions

- Vic Ghezzi (8), Bob Hamilton, Sam Snead (7)

7. Top 30 players and ties from the 1942 Masters Tournament

- Sammy Byrd (8), Jim Ferrier, Jim Foulis, Chick Harbert, Chandler Harper, Dutch Harrison, Ben Hogan, Herman Keiser, Gene Kunes, Jug McSpaden, Johnny Palmer, Toney Penna, Felix Serafin, Jimmy Thomson
- Tommy Armour (2,4,6), Harry Cooper, Bobby Cruickshank, Willie Goggin, Paul Runyan (6) and Bud Ward (3,a) did not play.

8. 1945 PGA Championship quarter-finalists

- Claude Harmon, Ralph Hutchison, Ky Laffoon
- Clarence Doser did not play.

9. Selected amateurs, not already qualified

- Bob Cochran (a), Fred Haas, Cary Middlecoff (a), Frank Stranahan (a)
- Ray Billows (a), Harry Givan (a), Chuck Kocsis (a), Jim McHale Jr. (a) did not play. Haas turned professional before the event.

10. Selected professionals, not already qualified

- Herman Barron, Johnny Bulla, Ed Dudley, Jimmy Hines, Lloyd Mangrum, Dick Metz, Ed Oliver, Jim Turnesa

11. One amateur, not already qualified, selected by a ballot of ex-U.S. Amateur champions

- Tommy Suffern Tailer (a) did not play

12. One professional, not already qualified, selected by a ballot of ex-U.S. Open champions

- Al Watrous

13. Two players, not already qualified, with the best scoring average in the winter part of the 1946 PGA Tour

- Leland Gibson, George Schneiter

14. Additional invitations

- Clayton Heafner, Rod Munday, Buck White, Al Zimmerman

== Round summaries ==
=== First round ===
Thursday, April 4, 1946

Place	Player	Score	To par
T1	(United States) Chick Harbert	69	−3
T1	(United States) Herman Keiser	69	−3
T3	(United States) Vic Ghezzi	71	−1
T3	(United States) Fred Haas	71	−1
T3	(United States) Toney Penna	71	−1
T6	(United States) Johnny Bulla	72	E
T6	(United States) Cary Middlecoff	72	E
T6	(United States) Byron Nelson	72	E
T6	(United States) Jimmy Thomson	72	E
T10	(United States) George Schneiter	73	+1
T10	(United States) Clayton Heafner	73	+1

=== Second round ===
Friday, April 5, 1946

Place	Player	Score	To par
1	(United States) Herman Keiser	69-68=137	−7
2	(United States) Jimmy Thomson	72-70=142	−2
3	(United States) Clayton Heafner	74-69=143	−1
T4	(United States) Bob Hamilton	75-69=144	E
T4	(United States) Chick Harbert	69-75=144	E
T4	(United States) Ben Hogan	74-70=144	E
T4	(United States) Toney Penna	71-73=144	E
T8	(United States) Jimmy Demaret	75-70=145	+1
T8	(United States) Jim Foulis	70-75=145	+1
T8	(United States) Byron Nelson	72-73=145	+1

=== Third round ===
Saturday, April 6, 1946

Place	Player	Score	To par
1	(United States) Herman Keiser	69-68-71=208	−8
2	(United States) Ben Hogan	74-70-69=213	−3
T3	(United States) Jim Ferrier	74-72-68=214	−2
T3	(United States) Fred Haas	71-75-68=214	−2
T3	(United States) Clayton Heafner	74-69-71=214	−2
6	(United States) Bob Hamilton	75-69-71=215	−1
T7	(United States) Jimmy Demaret	75-70-71=216	E
T7	(United States) Byron Nelson	72-73-71=216	E
T9	(United States) Jim Foulis	75-70-72=217	+1
T9	(United States) Vic Ghezzi	71-79-67=217	+1
T9	(United States) Ky Laffoon	74-73-70=217	+1

=== Final round ===
Sunday, April 7, 1946

==== Final leaderboard ====
Champion
Silver Cup winner (low amateur)
(a) = amateur
(c) = past champion

Top 10
Place	Player	Score	To par	Money (US$)
1	(United States) Herman Keiser	69-68-71-74=282	−6	2,500
2	(United States) Ben Hogan	74-70-69-70=283	−5	1,500
3	(United States) Bob Hamilton	75-69-71-72=287	−1	1,000
T4	(United States) Jimmy Demaret (c)	75-70-71-73=289	+1	683
T4	(United States) Jim Ferrier	74-72-68-75=289	+1	683
T4	(United States) Ky Laffoon	74-73-70-72=289	+1	683
T7	(United States) Chick Harbert	69-75-76-70=290	+2	356
T7	(United States) Clayton Heafner	74-69-71-76=290	+2	356
T7	(United States) Byron Nelson (c)	72-73-71-74=290	+2	356
T7	(United States) Sam Snead	74-75-70-71=290	+2	356

Leaderboard below the top 10
Place	Player	Score	To par	Money ($)
11	(United States) Jim Foulis	75-70-72-74=291	+3	250
T12	(United States) Vic Ghezzi	71-79-67-76=293	+5	213
T12	(United States) Cary Middlecoff (a)	72-76-71-74=293	+5	0
T12	(United States) George Schneiter	73-73-72-75=293	+5	213
15	(United States) Fred Haas	71-75-68-80=294	+6	175
T16	(United States) Johnny Bulla	72-76-73-74=295	+7	138
T16	(United States) Lloyd Mangrum	76-75-72-72=295	+7	138
18	(United States) Claude Harmon	76-75-74-71=296	+8	100
19	(United States) Chandler Harper	74-76-73-74=297	+9	100
20	(United States) Frank Stranahan (a)	76-74-73-75=298	+10	0
T21	(United States) Lawson Little	74-74-78-73=299	+11	50
T21	(United States) Toney Penna	71-73-80-75=299	+11	50
T21	(United States) Felix Serafin	76-75-79-69=299	+11	50
T21	(United States) Horton Smith (c)	78-77-75-69=299	+11	50
T25	(United States) Herman Barron	74-73-74-79=300	+12	
T25	(United States) Henry Picard (c)	79-73-71-77=300	+12	
T25	(United States) Denny Shute	79-77-71-73=300	+12	
T25	(United States) Jimmy Thomson	72-70-79-79=300	+12	
T29	(United States) Gene Kunes	76-72-77-76=301	+13	
T29	(United States) Jug McSpaden	75-74-75-77=301	+13	
T29	(United States) Al Zimmerman	76-76-74-75=301	+13	
T32	(United States) Ed Dudley	76-76-76-74=302	+14	
T32	(United States) Bobby Jones	75-72-77-78=302	+14	
T32	(United States) Dick Metz	77-75-71-79=302	+14	
T32	(United States) Johnny Palmer	76-75-77-74=302	+14	
T32	(United States) Al Watrous	80-76-72-74=302	+14	
T37	(United States) Dutch Harrison	75-77-75-76=303	+15	
T37	(United States) Ed Oliver	79-73-71-80=303	+15	
T37	(United States) Jim Turnesa	73-78-71-81=303	+15	
40	(United States) Sammy Byrd	75-79-71-79=304	+16	
T41	(United States) Dick Chapman (a)	77-77-73-79=306	+18	
T41	(United States) Ralph Hutchison	79-78-75-74=306	+18	
43	(United States) Leland Gibson	78-80-75-75=308	+20	
44	(United States) Rod Munday	78-77-76-78=309	+21	
45	(United States) Buck White	77-82-76-75=310	+22	
46	(United States) Billy Burke	80-80-77-75=312	+24	
47	(United States) Bob Cochran (a)	81-76-76-80=313	+25	
48	(United States) Ralph Guldahl (c)	85-76-78-76=315	+27	
49	(United States) Jimmy Hines	79-80-77-80=316	+28	
50	(United States) Charlie Yates (a)	78-79-78-86=321	+33	
WD	(United States) Craig Wood (c)	83	+11	

==== Scorecard ====
Hole	1	2	3	4	5	6	7	8	9	10	11	12	13	14	15	16	17	18
Par	4	5	4	3	4	3	4	5	4	4	4	3	5	4	5	3	4	4
(United States) Keiser	−7	−8	−8	−8	−7	−8	−7	−8	−7	−7	−7	−7	−7	−7	−7	−7	−7	−6
(United States) Hogan	−2	−3	−3	−3	−3	−3	−3	−4	−4	−4	−4	−5	−6	−5	−6	−6	−6	−5

Cumulative tournament scores, relative to par
