= World Championship of Golf =

Golf tournament formerly on the PGA Tour

The World Championship of Golf was a championship played on the PGA Tour in the 1940s and 1950s that, in its latter years, had a purse that dwarfed every other event on the tour, including the U.S. Open. It was played in August of each year at the Tam O'Shanter Country Club, in Niles, Illinois. The same course was the venue for the All American Open played the preceding week; both tournaments were instigated by course owner George S. May. In 1953, the championship was the first golf tournament to be shown live on national television, and ended with Lew Worsham holing a wedge shot from the fairway for eagle and victory.

== History ==
From 1946 to 1948, the event was a 36-hole, winner-take-all exhibition event, with fields of four, eight, and twelve golfers, respectively. The winner took home prizes of $10,000, $5,000, and $10,000, respectively, and the losers were given generous travel expenses.

Beginning in 1949, however, the event grew to a full-fledged 72-hole championship with a large invited field, became part of the main tour, and with its huge prize fund, became undoubtedly one of the most important tournaments for the professionals. From 1949 to 1951, its winner would go home with a check for over $10,000 – this in the days when most tour events had a first prize of $2,000 – but it was from 1952 to 1957 that the purse grew to astronomical levels. The winner took home $25,000 in 1952 and 1953, and starting in 1954, $50,000 with an additional $50,000 available in the form of a contract with May for 50 worldwide exhibition events.

In each of those years (1952–57), the winner of the Championship topped the tour's money list by some distance – in 1954, for example, Bob Toski led the season's money earnings with $64,000, while Jack Burke Jr. was second with just $20,000. Without the $50,000 from his one victory at Tam O'Shanter, he would have finished just tenth in earnings, despite winning three other tournaments. In 1957, Dick Mayer won both the U.S. Open – and a check for $7,200 – and this championship, and a check for $50,000.

The event provided one of the few showcases of its time for leading international players to compete against the best U.S. professionals, who rarely travelled outside of their country to play. Although none would win the title, players like Bobby Locke, Norman Von Nida, Roberto De Vicenzo, and Peter Thomson would all enjoy high finishes in the tournament, De Vicenzo and Thomson in particular regularly collecting big checks.

In 1958, May decided to pull the plug on the event in a dispute with the PGA over player entrance fees, and it disappeared from the tour. The leading money winner for 1958, Arnold Palmer, won less money during the entire season than Dick Mayer had won at Tam O'Shanter in 1957.

== Winners ==
Year	Player	Country	Score	To par	Margin of victory	Runner(s)-up	Winner's share ($)
1957	Dick Mayer	United States	279	−9	1 stroke	(Canada) Al Balding (United States) Sam Snead	50,000
1956	Ted Kroll	United States	273	−15	3 strokes	(United States) Fred Hawkins	50,000
1955	Julius Boros	United States	281	−7	2 strokes	(United States) Fred Haas	50,000
1954	Bob Toski	United States	274	−14	1 stroke	(United States) Jack Burke Jr. (United States) Earl Stewart	50,000
1953	Lew Worsham	United States	278	−10	1 stroke	(United States) Chandler Harper	25,000
1952	Julius Boros	United States	276	−12	Playoff	(United States) Cary Middlecoff	25,000
1951	Ben Hogan	United States	273	−15	3 strokes	(United States) Jimmy Demaret	12,500
1950	Henry Ransom	United States	281	−7	Playoff	(United States) Chick Harbert	11,000
1949	Johnny Palmer	United States	275	−13	Playoff	(United States) Jimmy Demaret	10,000
1948	Lloyd Mangrum	United States	135	−9	Playoff	(United States) Dutch Harrison (United States) Sam Snead	10,000
1947	Ben Hogan	United States	135	−9	3 strokes	(South Africa) Bobby Locke	5,000
1946	Sam Snead	United States	138	−6	2 strokes	(United States) Byron Nelson	10,000
