= Cavalier Specialists Invitational =

Golf tournament

The Cavalier Specialists Invitational was a golf tournament played at the Cavalier Yacht & Country Club in Virginia Beach, Virginia. It was played from 1948 to 1950. The tournament was played over 54 holes. A separate team event was also played.

== Winners ==
Year	Player	Country	Score	To par	Margin of victory	Runner-up	Winner's share ($)	Ref
1950	Fred Hawkins	United States	200	−7	2 strokes	(United States) Clayton Heafner	1,000	
1949	Bobby Locke	South Africa	201	−6	Playoff	(United States) Frank Stranahan (a)	1,500	
1948	Lew Worsham	United States	198	−9	4 strokes	(United States) Jimmy Demaret	1,000	
