= Tam O'Shanter Golf Course =

Golf course in Niles, Illinois

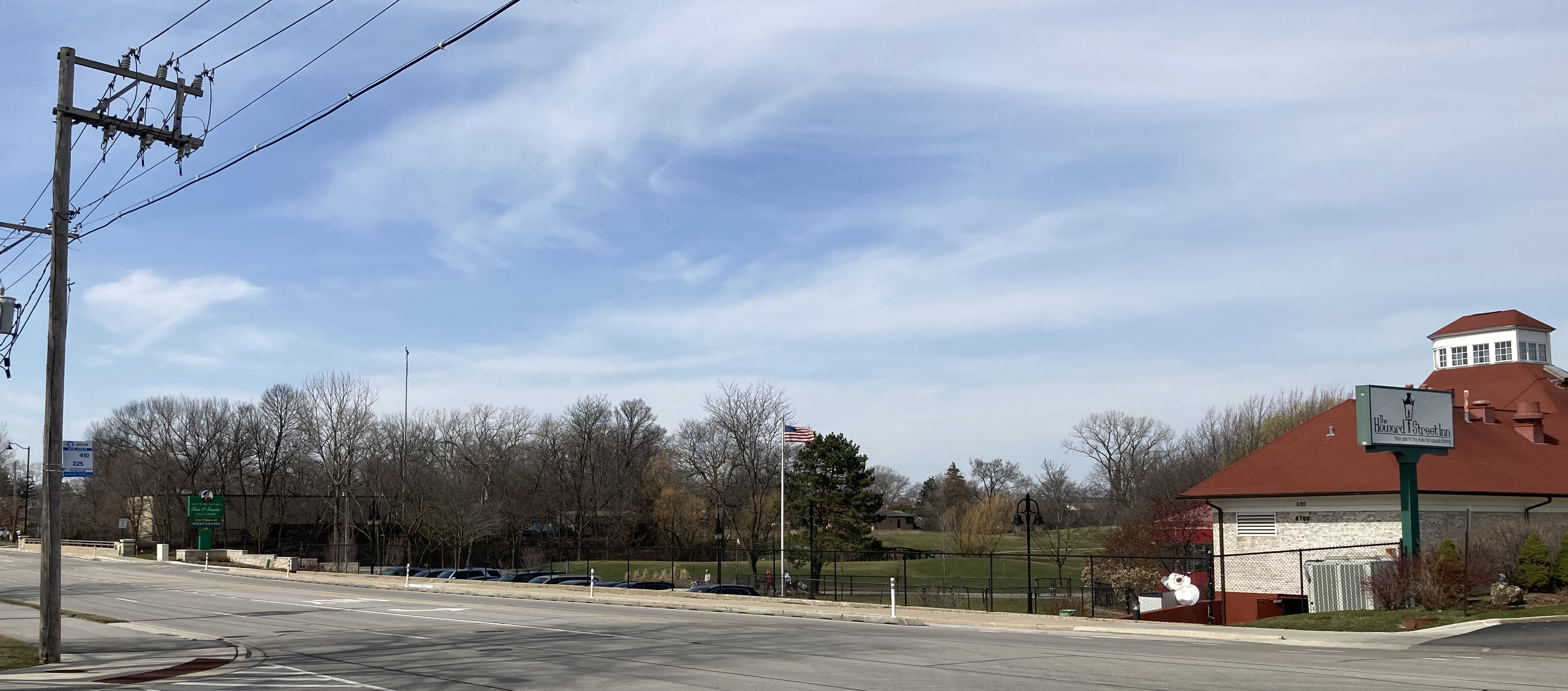
- Interactive map of Tam O'Shanter Golf Course
- 42.020068°N 87.794625°W

Club information
- Location: Niles, Illinois
- Website: www.niles-parks.org/tam-o-shanter-golf-course

The Tam O'Shanter Golf Course is located in Niles, Illinois. The north branch of the Chicago River flows through the course.

The course and clubhouse were previously owned by George S. May and are currently under the ownership of the Niles Park District.

Under May's ownership, the course hosted several prominent golf tournaments on the PGA Tour: All American Open (1941–57) and World Championship of Golf (1946–57) and the LPGA Tour: All American Open (1943–57) and World Championship (1948–57).

In 1953, May's associate, Chet Posson, approved the presence of television cameras at the World Championship of Golf, and allowed for one hour of the tournament to be televised, a broadcast that drew approximately 2 million viewers, and marking the first time that golf would be viewed live on American television. While Chandler Harper was being declared the winner for the television audience, they saw Lew Worsham use a wedge to hit an eagle from 104 yards for an unexpected win.

In 1964 and 1965, the course hosted the Western Open.

In 1971, the course was sold to a developer and reduced to 9 holes. The Niles Park District reopened the course in 1973.

Severe storms over the course of September 12–14, 2008 caused over $100,000 in damage to the course. Niles Park District Director Joe LoVerde was quoted "This is the biggest hit we've ever taken. That was one tough storm."
