= George S. May =

American businessman (1890–1962)

George Storr May (June 5, 1890 – March 12, 1962) was an American businessman and golf promoter.

May was born in Windsor, Illinois. He graduated with a degree from the Illinois State Teacher College. First working as a Bible salesman, following Billy Sunday, he soon turned his natural talent for problem-solving to use by becoming a freelance consultant, and efficiency expert.

In 1924 he started his first consulting assignment with Chicago Flexible Shaft Company, today's Sunbeam Corporation. This was the beginning of the George S. May International Company. May based his business operations in Chicago.

== Involvement in golf ==
George S. May is well known for popularizing the game of golf in the 1940s and 1950s by turning golf into a mass spectator sport. He staged a number of tournaments, including the All American Open and the World Championship of Golf, at the country club he owned, Tam O'Shanter Golf Course, located in Niles, Illinois.

May was the first to broadcast golf nationally on television, in 1953 from the Tom O'Shanter Golf Course. Lew Worsham provided exceptional drama by sinking his wedge approach for an eagle two from just over 100 yards on the par-4 final hole, to edge Chandler Harper by one stroke, claiming a $25,000 first prize (then a world record), along with a further 25 $1,000 exhibitions to promote May's company. The first prize of that event was larger than the total prize money offered at any other Tour event that season. May doubled his first prize the next year, 1954, to a then-record $50,000, out of a total prize of $100,000 (another record), along with an additional 50 paid exhibitions at $1,000 each. Bob Toski won that tournament.

May paid broadcasters to cover his events, but foresaw the future, where the broadcasters would pay the tournament organizers; this happened within a few years, notably with the Masters Tournament. May has been called the Bill Veeck of golf.

May was the first to offer big-money tournaments, first to allow club members to use golf carts, first to provide grandstands, and first to use radios to keep spectators up to date about what was happening elsewhere on the course. He kept his admission prices low, allowing families to attend, and allowed picnics in the rough bordering holes during his events.

He was inducted into the Illinois Golf Hall of Fame in 1992, as a golf innovator.

George S. May Company is featured in the History of the PGA, for the years 1949 & 1950. In 1949, the PGA ran a business survey, and in 1950 they implemented the recommendations of splitting the PGA from the tournament Bureau.

May is listed as one of the 100 most influential persons to the game of golf, for being the first to broadcast, nationwide and live, a PGA Tour tournament. The United States Golf Association followed May's lead in 1954 with the first nationwide broadcast of the U.S. Open, and the Augusta National Golf Club first broadcast the Masters Tournament live in 1956. Live television coverage of golf's important events greatly spurred interest in the sport, leading to constant increases in prize money.

The All-American tournament held at the Tam O'Shanter golf course in 1943 was the first Open tournament in the United States to welcome African-American golfers to the pro circuit. May is quoted as saying "These tournaments are open to any American who is willing and able to qualify." His events at Tam O'Shanter also featured men's amateur competitions, as well as both women's amateur and professional competitions, another first, since women's professional golf was in its infancy at that time. May also welcomed international players to his events.

From the early 1940s to the late 1950s, May offered nearly $2 million in prize money at his events, far outdistancing any other golf promoter during this period.
