= Carolinas PGA Championship =

The Carolinas PGA Championship is a golf tournament that is the section championship of the Carolinas section of the PGA of America. It has been played annually since 1923 at a variety of courses around both states.

== Winners ==
- 2026 Adam Fisher
- 2025 Cooper Hrabak
- 2024 Preston Cole
- 2023 Steve Bogdanoff
- 2022 Jon Mayer
- 2021 Morgan Deneen
- 2020 Tommy Gibson
- 2019 Matt Vick
- 2018 Steve Scott
- 2017 Charles Frost
- 2016 Savio Nazareth
- 2015 Mike Townsend
- 2014 Jerry Haas
- 2013 Kelly Mitchum
- 2012 Kelly Mitchum
- 2011 Gus Ulrich
- 2010 Todd Camplin
- 2009 Jeff Peck
- 2008 Billy Anderson
- 2007 Curt Sanders
- 2006 Kelly Mitchum
- 2005 Larry George
- 2004 Kelly Mitchum
- 2003 Jeff Lankford
- 2002 Kelly Mitchum
- 2001 Jeff Lankford
- 2000 Tim Dunlavey
- 1999 Byran Sullivan
- 1998 Chip Sullivan
- 1997 Chris Tucker
- 1996 Rick Lewallen
- 1995 Tim Dunlavey
- 1994 Bob Boyd
- 1993 Bob Boyd
- 1992 Ron Cerrudo
- 1991 Chris Tucker
- 1990 Chris Tucker
- 1989 Bob Boyd
- 1988 Dale Fuller
- 1987 David Thore
- 1986 David Thore
- 1985 Leonard Thompson
- 1984 Bob Boyd
- 1983 Tim Collins
- 1982 Tim Collins
- 1981 Ronnie Parker
- 1980 Richard Lee
- 1979 Ronnie Smoak
- 1978 Bob Leaver
- 1977 Mike Schlueter
- 1976 Roger Watson
- 1975 Roger Watson
- 1974 Terry Wilcox
- 1973 O'Dell Massey
- 1972 Bob Bruno
- 1971 Bob Galloway
- 1970 Brad Anderson
- 1969 Buck Adams
- 1968 Hamp Auld
- 1967 Bobby Mitchell
- 1966 Jim Ferree
- 1965 Bob Spence
- 1964 Julius Boros
- 1963 Furman Hayes
- 1962 Davis Love Jr.
- 1961 Wayne Haley
- 1960 Avery Beck
- 1959 Mike Souchak
- 1958 Thorne Wood
- 1957 Furman Hayes
- 1956 Julius Boros
- 1955 Al Smith
- 1954 Johnny Palmer
- 1953 Al Smith
- 1952 Johnny Palmer
- 1951 Johnny Palmer
- 1950 Clayton Heafner
- 1949 Johnny Palmer
- 1948 Johnny Palmer
- 1947 Bobby Locke
- 1946 Dave Tinsley
- 1945 Orville White
- 1944 Purvis Ferree
- 1941–43 No tournament
- 1940 Charles Farlow
- 1930–39 No tournament
- 1929 Bill Goebell
- 1928 Marshall Crichton
- 1927 Ralph S. Miner
- 1926 Charles Reynolds
- 1925 Bill Goebel
- 1924 Frank Clark
- 1923 Ralph S. Miner
