= Leonard Thompson (golfer) =

American professional golfer (born 1947)

Personal information
- Full name: Leonard Stephen Thompson
- Nationality: United States
- Born: January 1, 1947 (age 79) Laurinburg, North Carolina, U.S.
- Height: 6 ft 1 in (1.85 m)
- Weight: 215 lb (98 kg; 15.4 st)

Career
- Sport: Golf
- College: Wake Forest University
- Turned professional: 1971
- Current tour: Champions Tour
- Former tour: PGA Tour
- Professional wins: 8

Number of wins by tour
- PGA Tour: 3
- PGA Tour Champions: 3

Best results in major championships
- Masters Tournament: T7: 1979
- PGA Championship: T10: 1975
- U.S. Open: T21: 1974
- The Open Championship: DNP

Leonard Stephen Thompson (born January 1, 1947) is an American professional golfer who has played on the PGA Tour, Nationwide Tour, and Champions Tour.

== Early life and amateur career ==
Thompson was born in Laurinburg, North Carolina. He attended Wake Forest University in Winston-Salem, North Carolina and was a member of the golf team. He was a teammate of future fellow PGA Tour players Joe Inman and Lanny Wadkins. In 1969, Thompson graduated from college.

== Professional career ==
In 1971, Thompson turned pro. He had more than 70 top-10 finishes in PGA Tour events during his career winning three times. His first win came in 1974 at Jackie Gleason's Inverrary Classic. His best finish in a major championship was T-7 at 1979 Masters Tournament.

During his late forties, Thompson, like so many of his colleagues, played some on the Nationwide Tour to prepare for the Champions Tour. His best finish in that venue was 6th at the 1996 Nike Tallahassee Open.

After turning 50 at the beginning of 1997, Thompson began play on the Senior PGA Tour. He has three wins on this Tour. He played in his milestone 1000th PGA Tour and Champions Tour event combined at the 2009 SAS Championship.

== Personal life ==
He lives in Ponte Vedra Beach, Florida.

== Awards and honors ==
In 1997, Thompson was inducted into the Wake Forest University Athletics Hall of Fame

== Amateur wins ==
- 1969 Sunnehanna Amateur

== Professional wins (8) ==
=== PGA Tour wins (3) ===
No.	Date	Tournament	Winning score	Margin of victory	Runner(s)-up
1	Feb 24, 1974	Jackie Gleason-Inverrary Classic	−10 (72-69-69-68=278)	1 stroke	(United States) Hale Irwin
2	Oct 30, 1977	Pensacola Open	−16 (70-65-65-68=268)	2 strokes	(United States) Curtis Strange
3	Jul 30, 1989	Buick Open	−15 (65-71-69-68=273)	1 stroke	(United States) Billy Andrade, (United States) Payne Stewart, (United States) Doug Tewell

=== Other wins (2) ===
this list may be incomplete

- 1975 Carolinas Open
- 1985 Carolinas PGA Championship

=== Senior PGA Tour wins (3) ===
No.	Date	Tournament	Winning score	Margin of victory	Runner-up
1	Aug 9, 1998	Coldwell Banker Burnet Classic	−10 (68-66=134)	Playoff	(Japan) Isao Aoki
2	Jul 9, 2000	State Farm Senior Classic	−11 (67-69-69=205)	Playoff	(Japan) Isao Aoki
3	May 13, 2001	Enterprise Rent-A-Car Match Play Championship	1 up		(Argentina) Vicente Fernández

Senior PGA Tour playoff record (2–0)

No.	Year	Tournament	Opponent	Result
1	1998	Coldwell Banker Burnet Classic	(Japan) Isao Aoki	Won with birdie on second extra hole
2	2000	State Farm Senior Classic	(Japan) Isao Aoki	Won with birdie on second extra hole

== Results in major championships ==
Tournament	1971	1972	1973	1974	1975	1976	1977	1978	1979
Masters Tournament				T41				T24	T7
U.S. Open	CUT			T21				T35	CUT
PGA Championship			T35	T17	T10	T22	T15	T42	T54

Tournament	1980	1981	1982	1983	1984	1985	1986	1987	1988	1989	1990
Masters Tournament	CUT										CUT
U.S. Open		T43		CUT						CUT	
PGA Championship	T26	T61	T22	T84	T48		CUT			T34	

Note: Thompson never played in The Open Championship

Top 10
Did not play

CUT = missed the half-way cut
"T" indicates a tie for a place

== See also ==
- 1971 PGA Tour Qualifying School graduates
- 1987 PGA Tour Qualifying School graduates
