= Pineland Country Club =

Country club in South Carolina

Coordinates: 34°14′37″N 79°10′50″W

Pineland Country Club near Mullins, South Carolina is one of South Carolina's oldest country clubs. The golf course was designed by Gene Hamm and it opened in 1971.
