= Randy Glover =

American golfer

Personal information
- Nationality: United States
- Born: December 31, 1941 (age 84) Sanford, North Carolina, U.S.

Career
- Sport: Golf
- College: University of Tennessee
- Status: Professional
- Former tour: PGA Tour
- Professional wins: 12

Number of wins by tour
- PGA Tour: 1
- Other: 11

Best results in major championships
- Masters Tournament: 53rd: 1966
- PGA Championship: CUT: 1974, 1975, 1976, 1980
- U.S. Open: T19: 1976
- The Open Championship: DNP

Randy Glover (born December 31, 1941) is an American professional golfer. He played on the PGA Tour in the 1960s.

== Early life and amateur career ==
In 1941, Glover was born in Sanford, North Carolina. He attended the University of Tennessee.

== Professional career ==
In 1962, turned professional and joined the PGA Tour. Glover played on the PGA Tour between 1962 and 1968, winning once, the 1967 Azalea Open Invitational. He also won the 1965 Utah Open, eight South Carolina Opens and two Carolinas Opens. His best finish in a major is T-19 at the 1976 U.S. Open.

As a senior, Glover won the 1992 Carolina Senior Match Play Championship and the opening event of the 1997 Senior Series at Champions Club in Alpharetta, Georgia.

Glover works as the head professional at Musgrove Mill Golf Club in Clinton, South Carolina.

== Personal life ==
Glover lives in Clinton, South Carolina.

== Professional wins (12) ==
=== PGA Tour wins (1) ===
No.	Date	Tournament	Winning score	Margin of victory	Runner-up
1	Apr 16, 1967	Azalea Open Invitational	−10 (68-69-67-74=278)	Playoff	(United States) Joe Campbell

PGA Tour playoff record (1–0)

No.	Year	Tournament	Opponent	Result
1	1967	Azalea Open Invitational	(United States) Joe Campbell	Won with birdie on second extra hole

=== Other wins (11) ===
- 1965 Utah Open
- 1967 Carolinas Open
- 1969 South Carolina Open
- 1970 South Carolina Open
- 1971 South Carolina Open
- 1972 South Carolina Open
- 1973 South Carolina Open
- 1977 South Carolina Open, Carolinas Open
- 1980 South Carolina Open
- 1981 South Carolina Open

== U.S. national team appearances ==
- PGA Cup: 1975 (winners), 1976 (winners), 1980 (winners)
