= 1971 PGA Tour Qualifying School graduates =

This is a list of the 1971 PGA Tour Qualifying School graduates. The event was held in mid-October at PGA National Golf Club in Palm Beach Gardens, Florida. It is generally regarded to be one of the greatest qualifying schools in history with a number of future stars graduating, including Lanny Wadkins and Tom Watson.

== Tournament summary ==
After three 72-hole regional qualifiers, there were 75 players in the 108-hole final qualifying tournament.

Bob Zender was the medalist as 23 players earned their tour cards. Overall, according to the Orlando Sentinel's Jim Warters, "The PGA tour qualifying school came and went just about the way the experts predicted." Elite, "nationally-known" amateurs such as Lanny Wadkins, Steve Melnyk, Allen Miller, and John Mahaffey "graduated to the tour with little difficulty." In addition, Bruce Fleisher and David Graham, "a couple of relatively new pros who should have earned their diplomas earlier," also finished in the top ten. In addition, the graduating class is considered to be one of the greatest in PGA Tour Qualifying Tournament history. Wadkins, Mahaffey, Graham, and another graduate, Tom Watson, went on to win major championships.

Sam Adams was considered to be the big surprise of the tournament. He opened with a 69, one of few sub-70 scores in the first round. He then shot rounds of 74 and 76 to fall behind. However, he closed with rounds of 70-70-69, seven-under-par over the course of those three rounds, to earn playing privileges. "I really didn't expect to do this well," Adams said after the tournament.

David Glenz had the best "comeback" of the tournament. He opened with rounds of 75, 74, and 80. He came back with consecutive rounds of 72, however, to put him in a tie for 28th place, just outside the cut-off figure. He opened the final round "shakily" with three pars. He then hit a poor drive and approach shot to the 4th hole. However, he holed his chip shot for a birdie. He made two birdies thereafter for a bogey-free 69 (−3). Glenz earned his card by multiple shots.

Mac O'Grady made his first of many Q-school appearances at this school. He did not successfully graduate. Calvin Peete also made his first appearance at the PGA Tour Qualifying Tournament. He did not successfully graduate either. Greg Powers attempted to make the tour for the second straight year. He was successful this time.

== List of graduates ==
Place	Player	Notes
1	(United States) Bob Zender	
T2	(United States) Sam Adams	
T2	(United States) Lanny Wadkins	Winner of 1970 U.S. Amateur
4	(United States) Steve Melnyk	Winner of 1969 U.S. Amateur
5	(United States) Tom Watson	
6	(United States) Allen Miller	Winner of 1970 Canadian Amateur
7	(United States) John Mahaffey	Winner of 1970 NCAA Championship
8	(United States) Bruce Fleisher	Winner of 1968 U.S. Amateur
9	(United States) Jim Barber	
10	(Australia) David Graham	Winner of 1970 French Open
T11	(United States) Forrest Fezler	Winner of 1969 California State Amateur
T11	(United States) Gary Groh	
T13	(United States) David Glenz	
T13	(United States) Leonard Thompson	Winner of 1969 Sunnehanna Amateur
T15	(United States) Mike Spang	
T15	(United States) Bill Ziobro	
T17	(United States) Ray Arinno	
T17	(United States) John Gentile	
T17	(Colombia) Rogelio Gonzalez	
T17	(United States) Dave Haberle	
T17	(United States) Wayne Peddy	
T17	(United States) Greg Powers	
T17	(United States) George Thorpe	
