= South Carolina Open =

The South Carolina Open is the South Carolina state open golf tournament, open to both amateurs and PGA professionals. It is organized by the Carolinas section of the PGA of America, and both state opens run by the Carolinas section, the North Carolina Open and the South Carolina Open, are the only ones in the United States that prohibit non-PGA professionals from competing. It has been played annually since 1952 at a variety of courses around the state.

== Winners ==
- 2026 Peter Skirpstas
- 2025 Josh Rackley
- 2024 Jon Mayer
- 2023 Aaron Black
- 2022 Andrew Cheek
- 2021 Derek Watson
- 2020 No tournament
- 2019 Derek Watson
- 2018 Jack Faraci (amateur)
- 2017 Tate Hoisington (amateur)
- 2016 Matt Bova
- 2015 Cory Schneider
- 2014 Rohan Allwood
- 2013 John Patterson (amateur)
- 2012 Jerry Haas
- 2011 Jordan Pomeranz
- 2010 Charles Frost
- 2009 Billy Anderson
- 2008 Len Calvert
- 2007 Kelly Mitchum
- 2006 Jordan Pomeranz (amateur)
- 2005 Kelly Mitchum
- 2004 Stephen Isley
- 2003 Kelly Mitchum
- 2002 Jeff Lankford
- 2001 Gregg Jones (amateur)
- 2000 Tim Dunlavey
- 1999 Mike Bright (amateur)
- 1998 Randy Few
- 1997 Bill Lewis
- 1996 Jason Smoak
- 1995 Tim Dunlavey
- 1994 Bob Boyd
- 1993 Bob Boyd
- 1992 Bob Boyd
- 1991 Barry Black (amateur)
- 1990 Barry Black (amateur)
- 1989 Bob Boyd
- 1988 Mike Lawrence
- 1987 Mike Lawrence
- 1986 Vic Lipscomb
- 1985 Bob Boyd
- 1984 Mike Lawrence
- 1983 Mike Bright
- 1982 Vic Lipscomb
- 1981 Randy Glover
- 1980 Randy Glover
- 1979 Vic Lipscomb
- 1978 Terry Florence
- 1977 Randy Glover
- 1976 Terry Florence
- 1975 Dick Horne (amateur)
- 1974 Russell Glover
- 1973 Randy Glover
- 1972 Randy Glover
- 1971 Randy Glover
- 1970 Randy Glover
- 1969 Randy Glover
- 1968 Jack Lewis Jr. (amateur)
- 1967 Norman Flynn
- 1966 Tommy Cuthbert (amateur)
- 1965 Harold Kneece
- 1964 Dillard Traynham (amateur)
- 1963 Tony Evans
- 1962 Bert Yancey
- 1961 Harold Kneece
- 1960 Harold Kneece
- 1959 Joe Zarhardt
- 1958 Melvin Hemphill
- 1957 Mack Briggs
- 1956 Harley Long (amateur)
- 1955 Orville White
- 1954 Orville White
- 1953 Orville White
- 1952 Steve Duda
