= Gene Hamm =

American golfer and golf course designer (1923–2016)

Personal information
- Full name: Eugene Perry Hamm Jr.
- Nationality: United States
- Born: 1923 Henderson, North Carolina, U.S.
- Died: December 10, 2016 (aged 93)

Career
- Sport: Golf
- Turned professional: 1954
- Professional wins: 3

Best results in major championships
- Masters Tournament: DNP
- PGA Championship: CUT: 1958
- U.S. Open: CUT: 1960
- The Open Championship: DNP

Eugene Perry Hamm Jr. (1923 – December 10, 2016) was an American professional golfer and golf course designer.

Hamm grew up in Raleigh, North Carolina and started his golf career as a caddy at the Raleigh Golf Association. He joined the U.S. Navy in 1943. Following World War II, he was employed at several golf clubs in the 1940s and early 1950s. These included New Bern Country Club in New Bern, North Carolina, in Pinehurst, North Carolina and in Mt. Airy, North Carolina. In 1954, he became a member of the PGA of America. Hamm qualified for the 1958 PGA Championship and 1960 U.S. Open. He won the 1966 North Carolina Open.

Hamm is best known as a golf course designer of courses in North Carolina, South Carolina, Virginia, Tennessee, and New York. After designing his first 9-hole course in 1949, he designed and oversaw the building of over 60 courses. In 1955, Hamm helped build the Duke University Golf Course in Durham, North Carolina, with Robert Trent Jones. He moved to Delaware to continue work with Jones, and then in 1959 moved back to Raleigh where he began his own design career. Many of his notable courses are located in Myrtle Beach, South Carolina.

Hamm died in 2016 at the age of 93.

== Professional wins ==
this list may be incomplete

- 1966 North Carolina Open
- 1977 Carolinas PGA Senior Open
- 1978 Carolinas PGA Senior Open

== Golf course designs ==
- 1954: Roanoke Country Club, Williamston, North Carolina
- 1958: Cedars Country Club, Chatham, Virginia https://golf-info-guide.com/courses/virginia/chatham/cedars-country-club.html
- 1959: Lynrock Golf Club, Eden, North Carolina
- 1966: Meadowbrook Country Club, Garner, North Carolina; listed on the National Register of Historic Places in 2009.
- 1967, 1972: North Ridge Country Club, Raleigh, North Carolina
- 1971: Pineland Country Club, Mullins, South Carolina
- 1985: Lochmere Golf Club, Cary, North Carolina
- 1989: Beacon Ridge, Seven Lakes, North Carolina
