= 1949 PGA Championship =

Golf tournament held in 1949

Coordinates: 37.647°N 77.705°W

Tournament information
- Dates: May 25–31, 1949
- Location: Henrico County, Virginia, U.S.
- Course: Hermitage Country Club (now known as Belmont Golf Course)
- Organized by: PGA of America
- Tour: PGA Tour
- Format: Match play - 6 rounds

Statistics
- Par: 71
- Length: 6,677 yards (6,105 m)
- Field: 64 to match play
- Cut: 149 (+8), playoff
- Prize fund: $17,700
- Winner's share: $3,500

Champion
- (United States) Sam Snead
- def. Johnny Palmer, 3 and 2

Location in the United States
Location in Virginia

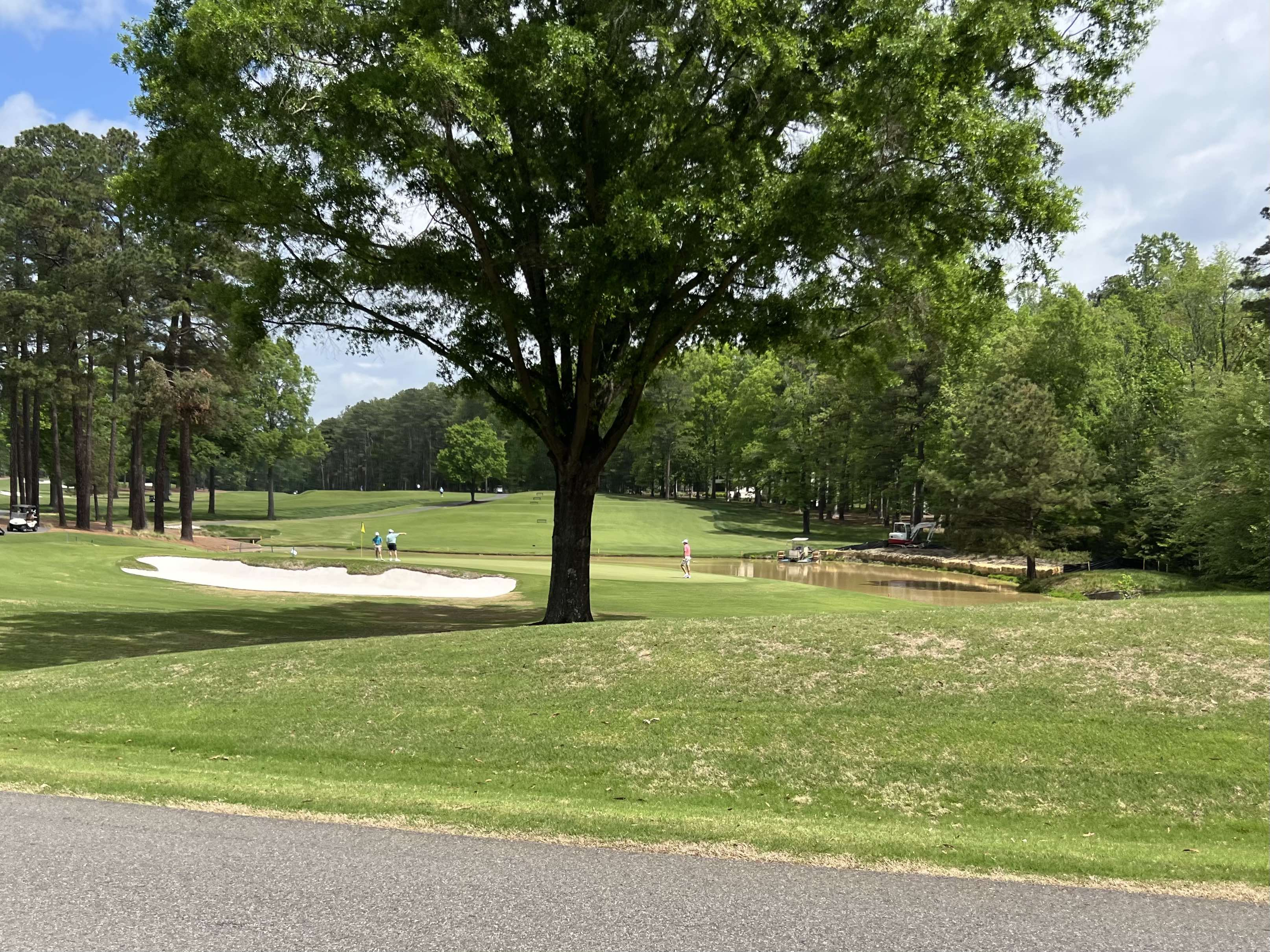
Hermitage Country Club golf course in Goochland County, Virginia (pictured in 2025), where the Championship was held.

The 1949 PGA Championship was the 31st PGA Championship, held May 25–31 in Virginia at Belmont Golf Course (formerly known as Hermitage Country Club), north of Richmond. Native Virginian Sam Snead won the match play championship, 3 and 2 over Johnny Palmer in the Tuesday final; the winner's share was $3,500 and the runner-up's was $1,500.

It was the second of Snead's three wins in the PGA Championship, and the fourth of his seven major titles. At age 37, Snead was the oldest to win the PGA Championship; he won again two years later in 1951.

The medalist in the stroke play qualifier was unsung Ray Wade Hill of Louisiana, who advanced to the quarterfinals.

Snead won the Masters in April; this was the first time the Masters champion had won the PGA Championship in the same calendar year. This has only been accomplished four times, most recently 51 years ago: Snead was followed by Jack Burke Jr. in 1956 and Jack Nicklaus in 1963 and 1975. Snead's double was in the spring, Burke and Nicklaus completed theirs in the summer.

Defending champion Ben Hogan did not play in any of the majors during the 1949 season, following a near-fatal automobile accident in west Texas in early February. In 1948, he won two majors, led the tour in money and wins (ten), and was player of the year; he had won two events in January 1949 (Pebble Beach, Long Beach), with a playoff runner-up in a third (Phoenix). Although Hogan returned to the tour in 1950 on a limited basis and won six more majors (nine total), he did not enter the PGA Championship again until age 48 in 1960, its third year as a stroke play event.

== Format ==
The match play format at the PGA Championship in 1949 called for 12 rounds (216 holes) in seven days:

- Wednesday and Thursday – 36-hole stroke play qualifier, 18 holes per day;
  - the top 64 professionals advanced to match play
    - defending champion Ben Hogan did not enter, out for the season with injuries from an automobile accident
- Friday – first two rounds, 18 holes each
- Saturday – third round – 36 holes
- Sunday – quarterfinals – 36 holes
- Monday – semifinals – 36 holes
- Tuesday – final – 36 holes

== Final results ==
Tuesday, May 31, 1949

Place	Player	Money ($)
1	(United States) Sam Snead	3,500
2	(United States) Johnny Palmer	1,500
T3	(United States) Jim Ferrier	750
T3	(United States) Lloyd Mangrum	750
T5	(United States) Jimmy Demaret	500
T5	(United States) Clayton Heafner	500
T5	(United States) Ray Wade Hill	500
T5	(United States) Henry Williams, Jr.	500

== Final eight bracket ==
Quarter-finals; May 29
Sam Snead	4&3
Jimmy Demaret
Jim Ferrier	3&2
Clayton Heafner
Johnny Palmer	7&6
Henry Williams, Jr.
Lloyd Mangrum	7&6
Ray Wade Hill

Semi-finals; May 30
Sam Snead	3&2
Jim Ferrier
Johnny Palmer	6&5
Lloyd Mangrum

Finals; May 31
Sam Snead	3&2
Johnny Palmer

== Final match scorecards ==
Morning

Hole	1	2	3	4	5	6	7	8	9	10	11	12	13	14	15	16	17	18
Par	4	4	4	3	4	4	4	4	5	5	4	4	3	4	4	4	4	3
(United States) Snead	4	4	4	3	4	3	4	5	4	4	4	4	3	4	4	5	3	3
(United States) Palmer	4	3	4	2	4	4	4	4	4	^	5	4	3	3	4	4	^	4
Leader	–	P1	P1	P2	P2	P1	P1	P2	P2	P1	–	–	–	P1	P1	P2	P1	–

^ = picked up ball (hole concession)

Afternoon

Hole	1	2	3	4	5	6	7	8	9	10	11	12	13	14	15	16	17	18
Par	4	4	4	3	4	4	4	4	5	5	4	4	3	4	4	4	4	3
(United States) Snead	4	4	4	2	4	3	3	4	6	4	4	4	2	4	4	4	Snead wins 3 and 2	
(United States) Palmer	4	4	4	3	4	4	4	4	4	4	4	4	3	4	4	4	Snead wins 3 and 2	
Leader	–	–	–	S1	S1	S2	S3	S3	S2	S2	S2	S2	S3	S3	S3	S3	Snead wins 3 and 2	

Birdie	Bogey
