= Empire State Open =

Golf tournament formerly on the PGA Tour

The Empire State Open was a golf tournament on the PGA Tour from 1950 to 1952. It was played in the Albany, New York area at two different courses. In 1950 and 1951, it was played at the Shaker Ridge Country Club in Loudonville. For its final year, it moved to the Normanside Country Club in Delmar.

In 1950, Skip Alexander won in an 18-hole playoff over Ky Laffoon. In 1951, Buck White won by two strokes over Doug Ford. In 1952, Jim Ferrier won by six strokes over Sam Snead. He shot an 18-under-par, 262 to threaten the PGA Tour record of 259 for a 72-hole tournament.

== Winners ==
Year	Player	Country	Score	To par	Margin of victory	Runner-up	Winner's share ($)	Ref
1952	Jim Ferrier	Australia	262	−18	6 strokes	(United States) Sam Snead	2,400	
1951	Buck White	United States	284	E	2 strokes	(United States) Doug Ford	2,400	
1950	Skip Alexander	United States	279	−5	Playoff	(United States) Ky Laffoon	2,600	
