= Carolinas Open =

Carolina golf tournament

The Carolinas Open is a golf tournament played in the Carolinas, open to both amateur and professional golfers. It is run by the Carolinas section of the PGA of America. It has been played annually since 1923 at a variety of courses around both states.

== Winners ==
- 2026 William Carr (a)
- 2025 Colin Salema (a)
- 2024 Seth Sweet
- 2023 Noah Connor (a)
- 2022 Grady Newton (a)
- 2021 Tommy Gibson
- 2020 Kelly Mitchum
- 2019 Rick Morton
- 2018 Jerry Haas
- 2017 Josh Nichols (a)
- 2016 Drew Younts
- 2015 Jerry Haas
- 2014 Steve Larick
- 2013 Ray Franz
- 2012 Aaron Black
- 2011 Jack Fields (a)
- 2010 Ivan Schronce
- 2009 Kelly Mitchum
- 2008 Scott Medlin
- 2007 Scott Medlin
- 2006 Kelly Mitchum
- 2005 Scott Medlin
- 2004 Tim Straub
- 2003 Jeff Lankford
- 2002 Steve Isley
- 2001 Gus Ulrich
- 2000 Karl Kimball
- 1999 Bob Boyd
- 1998 Jeff Lankford
- 1997 David Thore
- 1996 Bryan Sullivan
- 1995 David Thore
- 1994 Chris Tucker
- 1993 Bob Boyd
- 1992 Vic Lipscomb
- 1991 Richard Kincaid
- 1990 Chris Tucker
- 1989 Bob Boyd
- 1988 Mike Kallam
- 1987 Mike Kallam
- 1986 Rodney Morrow
- 1985 Neal Lancaster
- 1984 Tim Collins
- 1983 Billy Poteat (a)
- 1982 Bob Boyd
- 1981 Jim Westbrook
- 1980 Jack Lewis Jr.
- 1979 Ronnie Smoak
- 1978 Mike Carn
- 1977 Randy Glover
- 1976 Russell Glover
- 1975 Leonard Thompson
- 1974 Vance Heafner (a)
- 1973 David Robinson
- 1972 Gene Thompson
- 1971 Hamp Auld
- 1970 Norman Flynn
- 1969 Brad Anderson
- 1968 Joe Inman (a)
- 1967 Randy Glover
- 1966 Sonny Ridenhour
- 1965 Sonny Ridenhour
- 1964 Davis Love Jr.
- 1963 Harold Kneece
- 1962 Charlie Smith (a)
- 1961 Ronny Thomas
- 1960 Al Smith
- 1959 P.J. Boatwright (a)
- 1958 Furman Hayes
- 1957 P.J. Boatwright (a)
- 1956 Billy Capps
- 1955 Charles Farlow
- 1954 Dow Finsterwald
- 1953 Clayton Heafner
- 1952 Bobby Locke and Billy Joe Patton (a) (tie)
- 1951 Billy Joe Patton (a)
- 1950 Johnny Palmer
- 1949 Johnny Palmer
- 1948 Bobby Locke
- 1947 Bobby Locke
- 1946 Skip Alexander
- 1945 Orville White
- 1944 Purvis Ferree
- 1942–1943 No tournament due to World War II
- 1941 Johnny Palmer
- 1940 Dave Tinsley
- 1939 Clayton Heafner
- 1938 Orville White
- 1937 Tony Manero
- 1936 Harold Long
- 1935 Fred McCanless
- 1934 Tony Manero
- 1933 Henry Picard
- 1932 Henry Picard
- 1931 Marshall Crichton
- 1930 Marshall Crichton
- 1929 Tully Blair (a)
- 1928 Marshall Crichton
- 1927 Bill Goebel
- 1926 Henry Picard
- 1925 Henry Picard
- 1924 Charles Reynolds
- 1923 Harold Woodman

(a) denotes amateur
