= Hermitage Country Club =

Private club and golf facility in Virginia

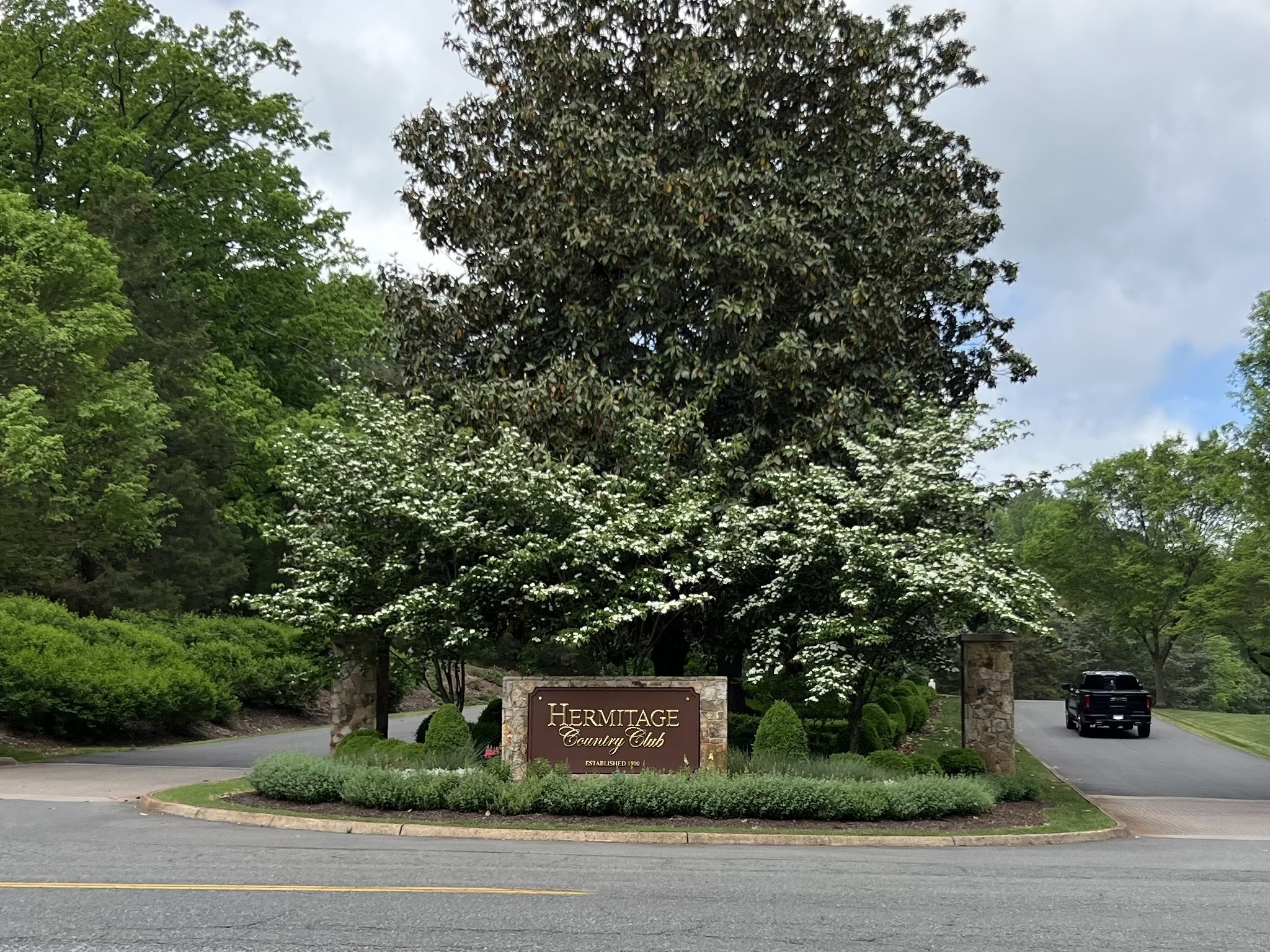
- The country club's main entrance gate, 2025

- Location within the United States Location within Virginia
- 37°38′50″N 77°42′16″W

Club information
- Location: Manakin Sabot, Virginia, U.S.
- Established: October 24, 1900
- Type: Private
- Tota holes: 36
- Tournaments: Crestar Classic (1983–1990)
- Greens: Creeping bentgrass
- Fairways: Creeping bentgrass
- Website: Official website

Manakin
- Designed by: Ed Ault; Keith Foster
- Par: 72
- Length: 6,965 yards (6,369 m)
- Course rating: 61.5–73.1
- Slope rating: 108–133

Sabot
- Designed by: Ed Ault; Arthur Hills
- Par: 72
- Length: 7,048 yards (6,445 m)
- Course rating: 62.3–74.2
- Slope rating: 110–138

Hermitage Country Club is a country club and private recreational facility located in Manakin Sabot in eastern Goochland County, Virginia, a suburb of the state capital of Richmond. Founded in 1900 in Richmond, it is one of the oldest golf clubs in Virginia.

Construction of the club's first permanent home in the Lakeside section of Henrico County was completed in 1917. The golf course, originally designed by A. W. Tillinghast and remodeled in 1940 by Donald Ross, hosted the PGA Championship in 1949, the first and only time a men's major championship was ever held in the state.

In the 1970s, the club sold its old property to the county and moved to their current location in Manakin Sabot. Current amenities include two 18-hole golf courses, one of which was renovated by Arthur Hills in 2000, a fitness center, and dining facilities.

== History ==
The club was organized on October 24, 1900, as "Hermitage Golf Club" by Berkeley Williams and a number of other Richmond businessmen, making it the 4th oldest country club in Virginia. In July 1916, the group was incorporated as "Hermitage Country Club" after its application was approved by the State Corporation Commission.

The club hosted the PGA Championship in 1949, at the course that later became Henrico County's Belmont Golf Course. Sam Snead won his second PGA Championship that year with a 3&2 victory over Johnny Palmer in the final match.

== Facilities ==
Hermitage has a large pool, four indoor and eight outdoor tennis courts, two 18-hole golf courses (Manakin and Sabot), a full gym and weight room, and two dining rooms.
