= Sioux City Open =

Golf tournament

The Sioux City Open was a PGA Tour event that was played for three years in the 1950s in Sioux City, Iowa, U.S. It was held at the Sioux City Boat Club, which was renamed the Two Rivers Golf Club in 1991.

The inaugural event was won by Jack Burke Jr. with a score of 65-68-65-70 (268), after a final day battle with Sam Snead. The winner's check was $2,600 out of a total purse of $15,000. Al Besselink had his first PGA Tour win at the final event.

== Winners ==
Year	Player	Country	Score	To par	Margin of victory	Runner(s)-up	Winner's share ($)
1950	Jack Burke Jr.	United States	268	−20	3 strokes	(United States) Skip Alexander	2,600
1951	Buck White	United States	272	−16	2 strokes	(United States) Jack Burke Jr. (United States) Ed Oliver (United States) Skee Riegel	2,400
1952	Al Besselink	United States	266	−22	4 strokes	(United States) Jerry Barber	2,400
