= Herman Keiser =

American professional golfer (1914–2003)

Personal information
- Full name: Herman W. Keiser
- Nationality: United States
- Born: October 7, 1914 Springfield, Missouri, U.S.
- Died: December 24, 2003 (aged 89) Akron, Ohio, U.S.

Career
- Sport: Golf
- Status: Professional
- Former tour: PGA Tour
- Professional wins: 8

Number of wins by tour
- PGA Tour: 5

Best results in major championships (wins: 1)
- Masters Tournament: Won: 1946
- PGA Championship: T17: 1940, 1957
- U.S. Open: T14: 1948
- The Open Championship: DNP

Herman Walter Keiser (October 7, 1914 – December 24, 2003) was an American professional golfer on the PGA Tour, best known for winning the Masters Tournament in 1946, his only major title.

== Career ==
Keiser was born and raised in Springfield, Missouri. Like most professional golfers of his generation, he earned a living primarily as a club professional. His first job was as the assistant golf professional at Portage Country Club in Akron, Ohio. He eventually became head professional at Firestone Country Club in Akron. Keiser's serious demeanor earned him the nickname, The Missouri Mortician, among his fellow golfers.

In 1942, Keiser interrupted his career to join the U.S. Navy for three years during World War II. He served as a storekeeper aboard USS Cincinnati. Keiser was discharged in 1945 and returned to play on the PGA Tour. Despite the long layoff, he earned second-place finishes to Sam Snead at the Greater Greensboro Open, to Buck White at the Memphis Invitational, and twice to leading money winner Ben Hogan, at the Dallas Invitational and the Phoenix Open. However, he achieved golfing immortality at the 1946 Masters Tournament when he took the lead on the third hole and never looked back, defeating Hogan by one stroke to earn $2,500 ($41,276 in 2025) in first-prize money. Keiser described his Masters win as "the greatest thing that ever happened to me." He won two more PGA Tour events that season.

Keiser was part of the American team that won the Ryder Cup in 1947. While the United States defeated Britain, 11–1, Keiser's loss to Sam King (4 and 3) prevented the Americans from a clean sweep.

Keiser retired in the 1950s, having won five tournaments during his PGA career. His only top ten in a major was his victory at Augusta in 1946. He returned to live in Ohio, where he purchased a driving range.

== Personal life ==
He died in Akron in 2003 from complications of Alzheimer's disease at the age of 89.

== Professional wins ==
=== PGA Tour wins (5) ===
- 1942 (1) Miami Biltmore International Four-Ball (with Chandler Harper)
- 1946 (3) **Masters Tournament**, Knoxville Invitational, Richmond Open
- 1947 (1) Esmeralda Open

Major championship is shown in bold.

=== Other wins ===
this list is probably incomplete

- 1939 Iowa Open
- 1949 Ohio Open
- 1951 Ohio Open

== Major championships ==
=== Wins (1) ===
Year	Championship	54 holes	Winning score	Margin	Runner-up
1946	Masters Tournament	5 shot lead	−6 (69-68-71-74=282)	1 stroke	(United States) Ben Hogan

=== Results timeline ===
Tournament	1940	1941	1942	1943	1944	1945	1946	1947	1948	1949
Masters Tournament			T23	NT	NT	NT	**1**	T24	T10	T11
U.S. Open	DQ	T26	NT	NT	NT	NT	T38		T14	CUT
PGA Championship	R32	R64		NT			R64	R64	R64	R64

Tournament	1950	1951	1952	1953	1954	1955	1956	1957	1958	1959
Masters Tournament	T14	T39				T56		CUT	CUT	CUT
U.S. Open		CUT								
PGA Championship		R64			R64			R32		

Tournament	1960	1961	1962	1963	1964	1965	1966	1967	1968	1969
Masters Tournament	CUT	CUT	WD	45	CUT	WD	CUT	CUT	CUT	WD
U.S. Open										
PGA Championship								CUT		

Tournament	1970	1971	1972	1973	1974	1975	1976	1977	1978	1979
Masters Tournament	CUT	WD	CUT		CUT					
U.S. Open										
PGA Championship										

Tournament	1980	1981	1982
Masters Tournament			WD
U.S. Open			
PGA Championship			

Note: Keiser never played in The Open Championship.

Win
Top 10
Did not play

NT = no tournament
WD = withdrew
DQ = disqualified
CUT = missed the half-way cut
R64, R32, R16, QF, SF = round in which player lost in PGA Championship match play
"T" indicates a tie for a place

=== Summary ===
Tournament	Wins	2nd	3rd	Top-5	Top-10	Top-25	Events	Cuts made
Masters Tournament	1	0	0	0	2	6	26	9
U.S. Open	0	0	0	0	0	1	6	3
The Open Championship	0	0	0	0	0	0	0	0
PGA Championship	0	0	0	0	0	2	9	9
Totals	1	0	0	0	2	9	41	21

- Most consecutive cuts made – 14 (1940 PGA – 1949 PGA)
- Longest streak of top-10s – 1 (twice)
