= North Carolina Open =

State Open golf tournament

The North Carolina Open is the North Carolina state open golf tournament, open to both amateurs and PGA professionals. It is organized by the Carolinas section of the PGA of America, and both state opens run by the Carolinas section, the North Carolina Open and the South Carolina Open, are the only ones in the United States that prohibit non-PGA professionals from competing. It has been played annually since 1965 at a variety of courses around the state.

== Winners ==
- 2026 Symon Balbin
- 2025 Brandon Einstein
- 2024 Noah Connor
- 2023 Tommy Gibson
- 2022 Eric Williamson
- 2021 Spencer Oxendine (a)
- 2020 Kelly Mitchum
- 2019 Ryan Tyndall
- 2018 Patrick Cover (a)
- 2017 David Kocher (a)
- 2016 David Kocher (a)
- 2015 Justin Tereshko (a)
- 2014 Nathan Stamey
- 2013 Spencer Lawson (a)
- 2012 Charles Frost
- 2011 Scott Harvey (a)
- 2010 David Rogers
- 2009 Steve Isley
- 2008 Karl Kimball
- 2007 Marc Matalavage (a)
- 2006 Billy Anderson
- 2005 Tim Straub
- 2004 Bob Boyd
- 2003 Greg Sweatt
- 2002 David Thore
- 2001 Stephen Isley
- 2000 Bob Boyd
- 1999 Karl Kimball
- 1998 Gus Ulrich
- 1997 Rick Morton
- 1996 Gus Ulrich
- 1995 Bob Boyd
- 1994 Randy Fuquay
- 1993 Jeff Lankford
- 1992 Randy Fuquay
- 1991 Chris Tucker
- 1990 Chris Tucker
- 1989 Roy Hunter
- 1988 Rick Morton
- 1987 Les Stradley
- 1986 Stuart Taylor
- 1985 Stuart Taylor
- 1984 Jack Lewis Jr.
- 1983 Waddy Stokes
- 1982 Tim Collins
- 1981 Thad Daber (a)
- 1980 Jack Lewis Jr.
- 1979 Jack Lewis Jr.
- 1978 Tim Collins
- 1977 Harvie Ward
- 1976 Terry Wilcox
- 1975 Sam Adams
- 1974 Terry Wilcox
- 1973 Bob Bryant (a)
- 1972 Bob Galloway
- 1971 Bob Spence
- 1970 George Smith
- 1969 Roger Watson
- 1968 Phil Hatley
- 1967 Dale Morey (a)
- 1966 Gene Hamm
- 1965 Billy Harvey (a)

a = amateur
