= Bob Toski =

American professional golfer (born 1926)

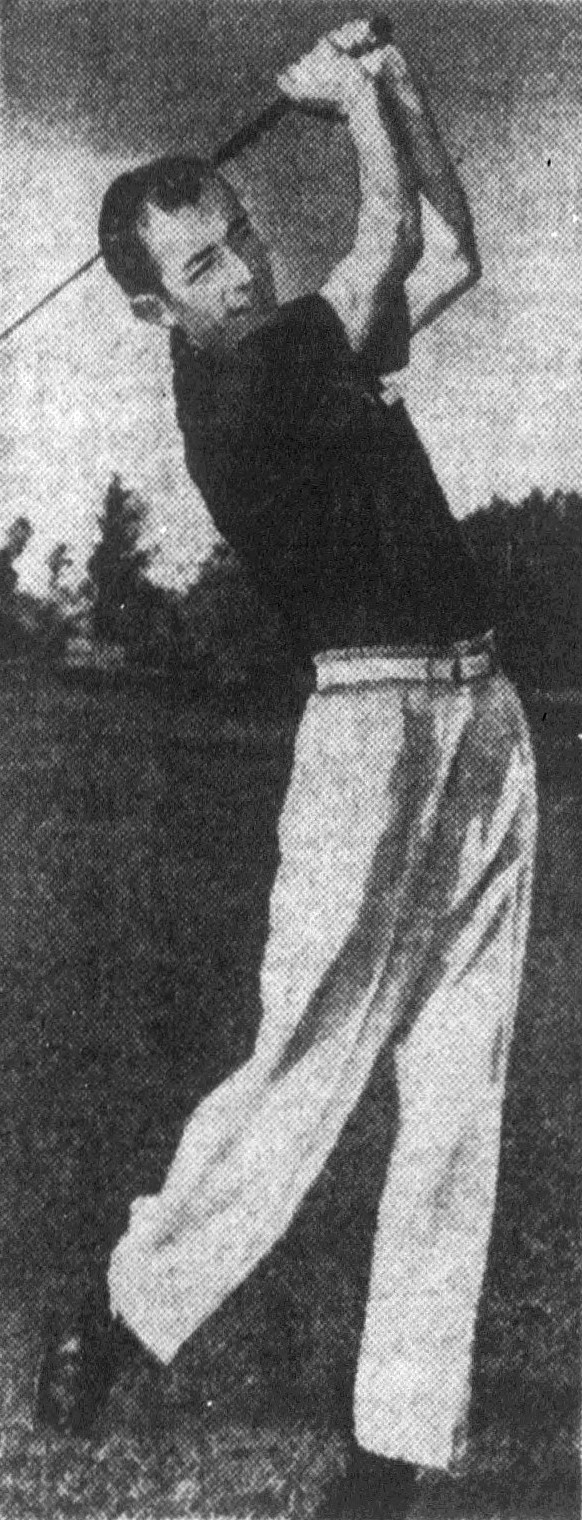
- Toski, circa 1954

Personal information
- Full name: Robert John Toski
- Nickname: Mighty Mouse
- Nationality: United States
- Born: September 18, 1926 (age 100) Haydenville, Massachusetts, U.S.
- Height: 5 ft 7 in (1.70 m)
- Weight: 135 lb (61 kg; 9.6 st)

Career
- Sport: Golf
- Turned professional: 1945
- Former tours: PGA Tour; Champions Tour
- Professional wins: 12

Number of wins by tour
- PGA Tour: 5
- Other: 7

Best results in major championships
- Masters Tournament: T18: 1951
- PGA Championship: T9: 1950, 1954
- U.S. Open: T17: 1956
- The Open Championship: DNP

Achievements and awards
- PGA Tour leading money winner: 1954

Robert John Toski (né Algustoski; born September 18, 1926) is an American professional golfer and golf instructor.

== Early life ==
In 1926, Toski was born in Haydenville, Massachusetts. He is of Polish descent, the eighth of nine children born to Walenty Algustoski and his wife Mary. He learned to play golf at Northampton Country Club, where he caddied and where two of his elder brothers, Jack and Ben, were assistant professionals.

== Professional career ==
In 1949, Toski joined the PGA Tour. He broke through for his first win in the Insurance City Open in 1953. He was the leading money winner in 1954, when his four victories included the World Championship of Golf, where first prize was $50,000, by far the richest prize-money golf event in the world. That victory also earned him a $50,000 contract from promoter George S. May to put on 50 exhibitions the following year; he would put on 57 and play in only 14 events in 1955. He scaled back his playing career starting in 1957 after wife Lynn gave birth to three boys in a span of less than four years.

Toski found stardom on the Tour despite weighing only 118 pounds. He was the smallest Tour player throughout his playing career and his combination of his small size and his driving prowess earned him the nickname "Mouse" from Sam Snead, a reference to the cartoon superhero Mighty Mouse popular at that time.

=== Later career ===
Toski left the tour aged 30 so he could spend more time with his young family and took a series of jobs as a club professional, while still competing occasionally on the Tour.

Later he found renewed fame as a leading golf coach, assisting tour pros such as World Golf Hall of Fame inductees Tom Kite and Judy Rankin as well as Australian star Bruce Crampton. He also wrote several golf instructional books, and made some of the earliest golf instruction videos. In the early 1980s he was a regular on NBC Sports golf telecasts. He worked as color commentator with Hughes Sports Network golf telecasts in the 1970s.

Toski began playing on the Senior PGA Tour upon its formation in 1980. He left the Tour in January 1986 after he became involved in a controversy over how he marked his ball in a tournament in Japan. Fellow senior golfer Gay Brewer stated that Toski improved his lie by marking it away from a spike mark near where his ball had come to rest on the green. Toski said that he had no recollection of any rules infraction. He returned in April 1986. He played several more years on the Tour.

== Personal life ==
Toski was married to Lynn. He has three children.

== Awards and honors ==
- In 1954, Toski won the PGA Tour's money list
- Toski was the first living instructor inducted into the World Golf Teachers Hall of Fame.
- Toski is a member of the National Polish-American Hall of Fame
- In 2013, Toski was inducted into the PGA Golf Professional Hall of Fame

== Professional wins (12) ==
=== PGA Tour wins (5) ===
- 1953 (1) Insurance City Open
- 1954 (4) Baton Rouge Open, Azalea Open, Eastern Open, World Championship of Golf

=== Other wins (5) ===
this list is probably incomplete

- 1953 Havana Invitational
- 1958 Massachusetts Open, Jamaica Open, Puerto Rico Open
- 1959 Maine Open

=== Other senior wins (2) ===
- 1990 Liberty Mutual Legends of Golf - Legendary Division (with Mike Fetchick)
- 1992 Liberty Mutual Legends of Golf - Legendary Division (with Mike Fetchick)

== Playoff record ==
Senior PGA Tour playoff record (0–1)

No.	Year	Tournament	Opponent	Result
1	1982	Merrill Lynch/Golf Digest Commemorative Pro-Am	(United States) Billy Casper	Lost to birdie on fourth extra hole

== Results in major championships ==
Tournament	1950	1951	1952	1953	1954	1955	1956	1957	1958	1959
Masters Tournament		T18	T40		T22	T41		CUT		
U.S. Open	T20	CUT			T18		T17		CUT	CUT
PGA Championship	R16	R64	R64	R32	R16			R128	T20	CUT

Tournament	1960	1961	1962	1963	1964	1965	1966	1967
Masters Tournament								
U.S. Open								
PGA Championship		CUT						T51

Note: Toski never played in The Open Championship.

Top 10
Did not play

CUT = missed the half-way cut
"T" indicates a tie for a place
R128, R64, R32, R16, QF, SF = round in which player lost in PGA Championship match play

== Major works ==
- Toski, Bob (1955). Beginner's Guide to Golf. New York: Grosset & Dunlap. ASIN B001CA8L8U.
- Casper, Billy; Toski, Bob (1966). Golf Shotmaking. New York: Golf Digest / Doubleday. ASIN B0000CN8TV.
- Toski, Bob (1971). The Touch System for Better Golf. Golf Digest. ASIN B00921CJVQ.
- Toski, Bob; Aultman, Dick (1980). Bob Toski's Complete Guide to Better Golf. Scribner. ISBN 978-0689705922.
- Toski, Bob (1981). Golf For a Lifetime. New York: Simon & Schuster. ISBN 978-0671437411.
- Toski, Bob; Flick, Jim (1984). How to Become a Complete Golfer. New York: Pocket Books. ISBN 978-0671723040.
- Toski, Bob; Love Jr., Davis (1988). How to Feel a Real Golf Swing. Random House. ISBN 978-0394561219.
- Find Your Own Fundamentals (with Jim Flick), Golf Digest, 1992
