= Seven Lakes, North Carolina =

- Census-designated place
- Location in Moore County and the state of North Carolina
- Coordinates: 35°15′53″N 79°35′11″W
- Country: United States
- State: North Carolina
- County: Moore

Area
  - Total: 10.05 sq mi (26.03 km^{2})
  - Land: 8.39 sq mi (21.72 km^{2})
  - Water: 1.66 sq mi (4.31 km^{2})
- Elevation: 617 ft (188 m)

Population (2020)
  - Total: 4,900
  - Density: 584.2/sq mi (225.55/km^{2})
- Time zone: UTC-5 (Eastern (EST))
  - Summer (DST): UTC-4 (EDT)
- ZIP Code: 27376
- Area codes: 910, 472
- FIPS code: 37-60515
- GNIS feature ID: 2402839

Seven Lakes is an unincorporated community and census-designated place (CDP) in Moore County, North Carolina, United States. As of the 2020 census, the population was 4,900.

== Geography ==
Seven Lakes is in western Moore County on both sides of North Carolina Highway 211, which leads southeast 9 miles (14 km) to Pinehurst and northwest 10 miles (16 km) to Candor.

According to the U.S. Census Bureau, the Pinehurst CDP has a total area of 10.05 square miles (26.03 km^{2}), of which 8.39 square miles (21.73 km^{2}) are land and 1.66 square miles (4.30 km^{2}), or 16.55%, are water. The majority of the community northeast of NC 211 (and the majority of the lakes) drains into Big Juniper Creek, a northeast-flowing tributary of McLendons Creek, a tributary of the Deep River, part of the Cape Fear River watershed. The Little River, a separate tributary of the Cape Fear River, rises in the easternmost part of Seven Lakes. The section of Seven Lakes southwest of NC 211 drains into Auman Lake, built on a tributary of Jackson Creek, which flows south to Drowning Creek, a south-flowing tributary of the Lumber River.

=== Features ===
The Seven Lakes community includes the North, South and West Side communities. North and South operate under one homeowners' association, while the West Side operates under a separate homeowners' association.

The North Side has seven lakes along with other amenities, including a horse stable providing trail rides for residences, a community pool, soccer field, basketball courts, tennis courts, and playground. Additionally, the community has a private gym with pool and tennis club for use with additional membership. The two largest lakes are Sequoia and Echo, which allow motor boat usage, with the other lakes limited to electric motors or paddled boats. The South Side does not have any lakes for recreational activities, but includes an 18-hole golf course.

=== Areas ===
==== Seven Lakes North & South ====
- Communities that includes a full park & playground, with a pool.
- Horseback riding.
- Tennis Courts.
- a privately owned and operated Fitness Center that can be joined for a fee.
- 8 to 9 smaller lakes.
- Country Club with golf course.

==== Seven Lakes West ====
- Seven Lakes West includes a large 791-acre (1.236 mi^{2}) reservoir named Lake Auman.
- It is a community of 3,000 acres (12 m2).
- Voted as "America's 100 Best Master Planned Communities" by Where to Retire magazine.
- Includes swimming pool, tennis courts, pickleball and walking trails.
- Includes an 18-hole golf course, named Beacon Ridge.
- Beacon Ridge is a Par 72 Golf Course, Built in 1989 it is a Gene Hamm design.
- Lake Auman participated in the Great North American Secchi Dip-In in 2001. The report basically said Lake Auman was the clearest lake south of the Great Lakes, east of the Rockies and north of Silver Springs Florida.
- Seven Lakes West has added a new addition to its community. Morgan Wood features lots with more than 3 acres (12,000 m^{2}). These lots are zoned to accommodate home owners who want to own horses or those who would just like a large lot.

== Demographics ==
Historical population
Census	Pop.	Note	%±
1990	2,049		—
2000	3,214		56.9%
2010	4,888		52.1%
2020	4,900		0.2%
U.S. Decennial Census

=== 2020 census ===
Seven Lakes racial composition
Race	Number	Percentage
White (non-Hispanic)	4,283	87.41%
Black or African American (non-Hispanic)	174	3.55%
Native American	9	0.18%
Asian	55	1.12%
Other/Mixed	144	2.94%
Hispanic or Latino	235	4.8%

As of the 2020 census, Seven Lakes had a population of 4,900. The median age was 51.0 years. 20.5% of residents were under the age of 18 and 30.3% were 65 years of age or older. For every 100 females, there were 94.4 males, and for every 100 females age 18 and over, there were 91.0 males.

0.0% of residents lived in urban areas, while 100.0% lived in rural areas.

There were 2,072 households in Seven Lakes, including 1,555 families. Of all households, 24.1% had children under the age of 18, 58.3% were married-couple households, 16.6% had a male householder with no spouse or partner present, and 22.7% had a female householder with no spouse or partner present. About 25.0% of all households were made up of individuals, and 13.9% had someone living alone who was 65 years of age or older.

There were 2,658 housing units, of which 22.0% were vacant. The homeowner vacancy rate was 5.0% and the rental vacancy rate was 22.8%.

=== 2000 census ===
As of the census of 2000, there were 3,214 people, 1,399 households, and 1,141 families residing in the CDP. The population density was 391.8 inhabitants per square mile (151.3/km^{2}). There were 1,537 housing units at an average density of 187.4 per square mile (72.4/km^{2}). The racial makeup of the CDP was 94.96% White, 3.73% African American, 0.22% Native American, 0.19% Asian, 0.12% from other races, and 0.78% from two or more races. Hispanic or Latino of any race were 0.81% of the population.

There were 1,399 households, out of which 17.9% had children under the age of 18 living with them, 76.3% were married couples living together, 4.4% had a female householder with no husband present, and 18.4% were non-families. 16.9% of all households were made up of individuals, and 12.2% had someone living alone who was 65 years of age or older. The average household size was 2.26 and the average family size was 2.47.

In the CDP, the population was spread out, with 14.9% under the age of 18, 2.3% from 18 to 24, 14.9% from 25 to 44, 25.5% from 45 to 64, and 42.5% who were 65 years of age or older. The median age was 60 years. For every 100 females, there were 90.5 males. For every 100 females age 18 and over, there were 90.0 males.

The median income for a household in the CDP was $53,237, and the median income for a family was $59,180. Males had a median income of $50,909 versus $31,776 for females. The per capita income for the CDP was $32,070. None of the families and 0.5% of the population were living below the poverty line, including no under eighteens and 0.6% of those over 64.
