= Nashville Invitational =

Golf tournament formerly on the PGA Tour

The Nashville Invitational, first played as the Nashville Open, was a PGA Tour event that was held at the former site of the Richland Country Club (established in 1901 as the Nashville Golf & Country Club) in the Woodmont section of Nashville, Tennessee (not to be confused with the current site near Brentwood, Tennessee) from 1944 to 1946. The par-72 course was redesigned by Donald Ross in the 1930s. The 1945 tournament was Ben Hogan's first PGA Tour victory following his return from service in the United States Army Air Forces during World War II.

== Winners ==
Year	Player	Country	Score	To par	Margin of victory	Runner(s)-up	Winner's share ($)	Ref
Nashville Invitational
1946	Johnny Palmer	United States	266	−18	Playoff	(United States) Dutch Harrison	2,000	
1945	Ben Hogan	United States	265	−19	4 strokes	(United States) Johnny Bulla (United States) Byron Nelson	2,666	
Nashville Open
1944	Byron Nelson	United States	269	−15	1 stroke	(United States) Jug McSpaden	2,400	
