= Tim Collins (golfer) =

American professional golfer (born 1945)

Personal information
- Full name: Clyde Ellett Collins, Jr.
- Nickname: Tim
- Nationality: United States
- Born: July 19, 1945 Christiansburg, Virginia, US
- Died: April 17, 2012 (aged 66) Winston-Salem, North Carolina, US
- Children: 2

Career
- Sport: Golf
- College: Virginia Tech
- Turned professional: 1972
- Former tour: PGA Tour
- Professional wins: 5

Best results in major championships
- Masters Tournament: DNP
- PGA Championship: CUT: 1981, 1983, 1984, 1985
- U.S. Open: T44: 1976
- The Open Championship: DNP

Clyde Ellett "Tim" Collins, Jr. (July 19, 1945 – April 17, 2012) was an American professional golfer. He earned All-America honors two years at Virginia Tech in the mid-1960s and went on to play professionally on the PGA Tour. He was a native of Christiansburg, Virginia.

== College career ==
Collins was the first full scholarship player for Virginia Tech in 1964. At Tech, he played in the NCAA golf championship for three consecutive years (1965–1967). He earned third team All-America honors in 1965, and finished seventh at the NCAA tournament, leading the Hokie team to an 11th-place finish. He capped his career by finishing tied for fifth in the 1967 event, three strokes back of Hale Irwin (known then as a Colorado football star). He also earned All-America honors, this time as a second team selection. No Tech golfer had finished higher in the NCAA tournament through 2018. He finished 20th at the 1966 NCAA tournament. Collins was the first golfer inducted into the Virginia Tech Sports Hall of Fame in 1985.

== Professional career ==
=== First PGA tournament ===
Collins served three years in the U.S. Army after graduating from college. After leaving the Army in December 1971, he resumed his golfing pursuits as an assistant club pro in Greenville, South Carolina. In his first attempt at qualifying for a PGA event, he won the Atlanta Sectional Qualifying tournament for the U.S. Open, making him eligible for the 1972 U.S. Open. At the event, the first ever played at Pebble Beach Golf Links, Collins shot an opening round 79, eight shots off the lead set by Jack Nicklaus. On the following day he shot a 71, three off the best of the day carded by two players: one of nine golfers tied for tournament leader Lanny Wadkins, and Arnold Palmer. He made the cut, and was just five behind the leaders going into Saturday, in a tie for 26th. He shot an 81 on Saturday, and was 60th going into the final round. On Sunday, he shot a 79, moving up to a 55th place tie for the week. Nicklaus bettered Bruce Crampton by three strokes, winning his 11th major championship. Collins earned $890, compared to $30,000 for Nicklaus. Collins said in a 1973 interview that the money was enough to pay for his trip to Monterey, California for the "vacation" to California with his wife. (Note, in the detailed statistical profile of Collins' career, his participation in the 1972 U.S. Open is not included, even though it is included in the same website in the full results of the actual tournament. This is likely because he did not yet have his Tournament Players Division (precursor to the PGA Tour) card.

=== Qualifying School 1972 ===
Encouraged by his success at Pebble Beach, he decided to take a shot at earning his Tournament Players Division "card" in the fall of 1972, going through Qualifying school. He was one of 468 to begin the process. In September, he was one of 30 from the Eastern Division tournament held in Rockville, Maryland to make it to the national event at the Silverado Country Club, in Napa, California. In total, 81 golfers took the written qualifying exam and played 108 holes to narrow the field down to 25. Larry Stubblefield and John Adams were the top finishers, and Collins was on the cut line and received his card for the following season.

=== Career results ===
In 1973, he played in a career-high 14 PGA tournaments, making the cut 13 times and carding two top-25 finishes. In 1974 he played in seven tournaments, making the cut in every attempt, and finishing in the top-10 two times, including a fifth place finish at the 1974 Kaiser International Open Invitational, played at the Silverado Country Club in Napa, California. He finished tied for 44th in the 1976 U.S. Open. He also played in five PGA Championship tournaments. He played in at least 38 PGA Tour events including the 61 listed in his PGA profile and the one 1972 U.S. Open which is not listed there.

== Professional wins ==
this list may be incomplete

- 1978 North Carolina Open
- 1982 North Carolina Open, Carolinas PGA Championship
- 1983 Carolinas PGA Championship
- 1984 Carolinas Open

== U.S. national team appearances ==
- PGA Cup: 1977 (tie), 1978, 1979, 1984

== See also ==
- 1972 PGA Tour Qualifying School graduates
