= Bob Boyd (golfer) =

American professional golfer (1955–2011)

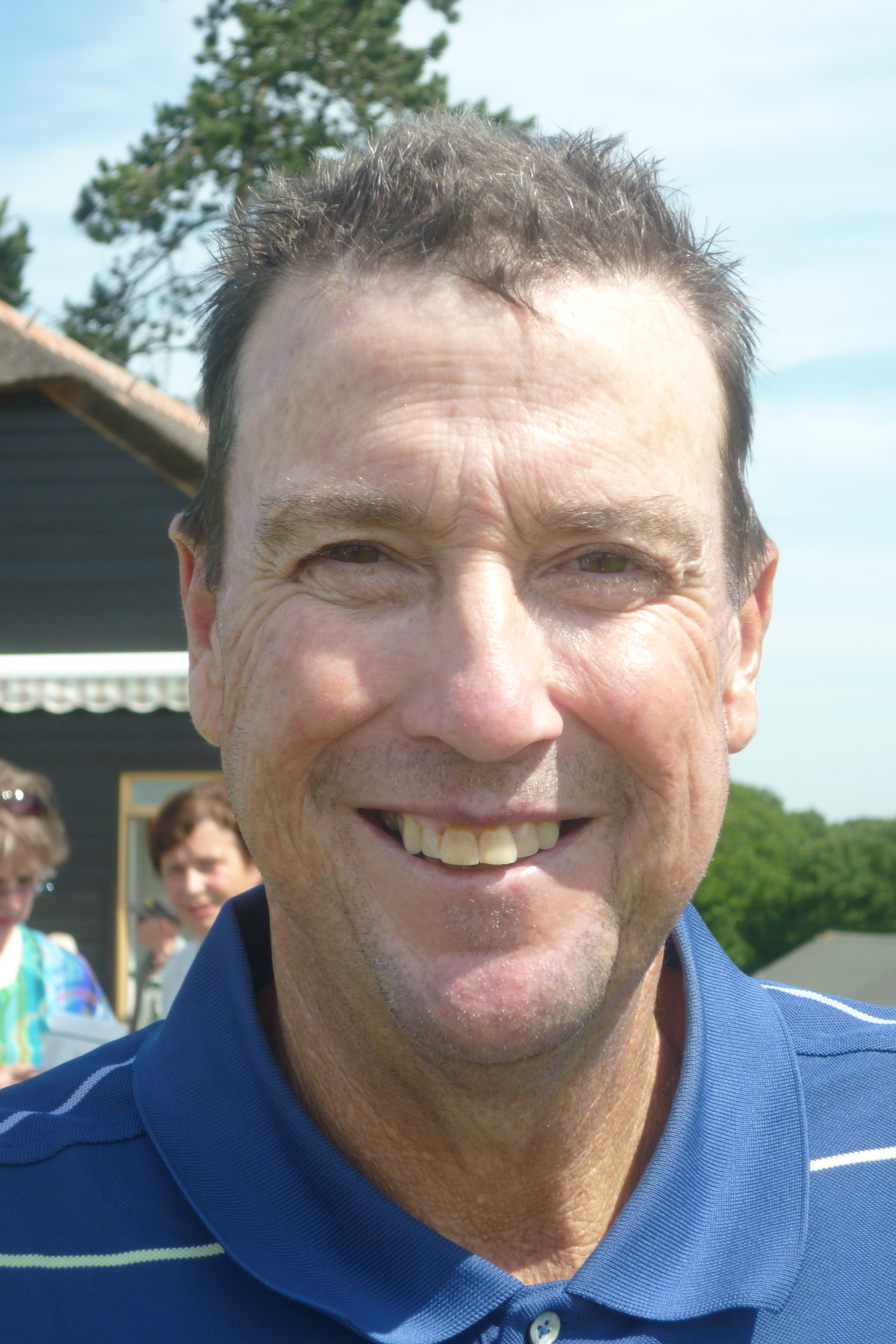

Personal information
- Full name: Robert McLean Boyd Jr.
- Nationality: United States
- Born: July 29, 1955 Mount Olive, North Carolina, U.S.
- Died: February 21, 2011 (aged 55)
- Spouse: Pamela Bennett Boyd
- Children: 1

Career
- Sport: Golf
- College: University of Maryland
- Turned professional: 1977
- Former tours: PGA Tour; Tarheel Tour; European Seniors Tour
- Professional wins: 20

Number of wins by tour
- European Senior Tour: 1
- Other: 19

Best results in major championships
- Masters Tournament: DNP
- PGA Championship: T19: 1990
- U.S. Open: T50: 1983
- The Open Championship: DNP

Robert McLean Boyd Jr. (July 29, 1955 – February 21, 2011) was an American professional golfer.

== Early life ==
Boyd was born in Mount Olive, North Carolina. He played his college golf at the University of Maryland. Boyd graduated in 1977.

== Professional career ==
In 1977, Boyd turned professional. Boyd spent 1983 and 1984 on the PGA Tour. His best finish was a T-6 at the 1983 Houston Coca-Cola Open. He also played a handful of tournaments on the developmental tour where his best finish was a T-4 at the 1996 Nike Carolina Classic.

Boyd also played on the European Seniors Tour from 2005 to 2010. He had won the Castellon Costa Azahar Open de España in 2005.

== Professional wins (20) ==
=== Tarheel Tour wins (1) ===
No.	Date	Tournament	Winning score	Margin of victory	Runner-up
1	Aug 22, 2002	Tradition Invitational	−10 (68-68-70=206)	2 strokes	(United States) Cortney Brisson

=== Other wins (18) ===
this list may be incomplete

- 1982 Carolinas Open
- 1984 Carolinas PGA Championship
- 1985 South Carolina Open
- 1988 PGA Club Professional Championship
- 1989 South Carolina Open, Carolinas Open, Carolinas PGA Championship
- 1990 Maryland Open
- 1992 South Carolina Open
- 1993 South Carolina Open, Carolinas Open, Carolinas PGA Championship
- 1994 South Carolina Open, Carolinas PGA Championship
- 1995 North Carolina Open
- 1999 Carolinas Open
- 2000 North Carolina Open
- 2004 North Carolina Open

=== European Senior Tour wins (1) ===
No.	Date	Tournament	Winning score	Margin of victory	Runners-up
1	Oct 2, 2005	Castellon Costa Azahar Open de España	−11 (68-66-71=205)	1 stroke	(England) Jim Rhodes, (Spain) José Rivero

European Senior Tour playoff record (0–2)

No.	Year	Tournament	Opponent	Result
1	2009	Irish Seniors Open	(Wales) Ian Woosnam	Lost to birdie on third extra hole
2	2009	Bad Ragaz PGA Seniors Open	(South Africa) John Bland	Lost to birdie on second extra hole

== Results in major championships ==
Tournament	1983	1984	1985	1986	1987	1988	1989	1990	1991	1992	1993	1994	1995	1996	1997	1998	1999
U.S. Open	T50				CUT	CUT	CUT	CUT	CUT								
PGA Championship	T30							T19			CUT	T30		T52	CUT	CUT	CUT

Note: Boyd never played in the Masters Tournament nor The Open Championship.

Did not play

CUT = missed the half-way cut
"T" = tied

== Other achievements ==
- 7-time Carolina PGA Player of the Year
- 22-time Carolina PGA section major winner

== U.S. national team appearances ==
- PGA Cup: 1990 (winners), 2000 (winners)

== See also ==
- 1982 PGA Tour Qualifying School graduates
