= Memphis Invitational =

Golf tournament formerly on the PGA Tour

The Memphis Invitational was a men's professional golf event played in 1945 and 1946. It was played at the Chickasaw Country Club, Memphis, Tennessee.

The 1945 tournament drew national attention as Byron Nelson had won 11 straight events on the PGA tour and was going for 12 in Memphis. Amateur Fred Haas won the tournament by five strokes, with Nelson finishing tied for fourth place, six strokes behind. George Low Jr. was the leading professional and took the first prize money.

== Winners ==
| Year | Player | Country | Score | To par | Margin of victory | Runner(s)-up | Winner's share ($) | Ref |
|---|---|---|---|---|---|---|---|---|
| 1946 | Buck White | United States | 277 | −11 | 1 stroke | (United States) Herman Keiser | 2,000 | |
| 1945 | Fred Haas (a) | United States | 270 | −18 | 5 strokes | (United States) Bob Cochran (a) (United States) George Low Jr. | (2,666) | |
