= Sam Adams (golfer) =

American professional golfer (born 1946)

Personal information
- Nationality: United States
- Born: May 9, 1946 (age 80) Boone, North Carolina, U.S.
- Height: 5 ft 7 in (1.70 m)
- Weight: 150 lb (68 kg; 11 st)

Career
- Sport: Golf
- College: Appalachian State University
- Turned professional: 1969
- Former tour: PGA Tour
- Professional wins: 3

Number of wins by tour
- PGA Tour: 1
- Other: 2

Best results in major championships
- Masters Tournament: CUT: 1974
- PGA Championship: CUT: 1974
- U.S. Open: T23: 1977
- The Open Championship: DNP

Sam Adams (born May 9, 1946) is an American professional golfer who played on the PGA Tour. He is one of few left-handers to win a PGA Tour event.

== Early life ==
Adams was born in Boone, North Carolina. He played collegiate golf at Appalachian State University.

== Professional career ==
In 1969, Adams turned professional. On September 30, 1973, Adams recorded the only victory of his PGA Tour career, posting a 16-under-par 268 at the Quad Cities Open to win by three strokes over Dwight Nevil and Kermit Zarley. He was the first American lefty to win on the PGA Tour. He also had several other top-10 finishes including a T-2 finish at the 1972 Canadian Open. His best finish in a major championship was a T-23 at the 1977 U.S. Open.

Adams played on the Sunbelt Senior Tour after reaching age 50.

== Professional wins (3) ==
=== PGA Tour wins (1) ===
| No. | Date | Tournament | Winning score | Margin of victory | Runners-up |
|---|---|---|---|---|---|
| 1 | Sep 30, 1973 | Quad Cities Open | −16 (72-64-64-68=268) | 3 strokes | (United States) Dwight Nevil, (United States) Kermit Zarley |

=== Other wins (2) ===
this list may be incomplete

- 1975 North Carolina Open
- 2000 Tennessee PGA Championship

== See also ==
- 1971 PGA Tour Qualifying School graduates
