= Terry Wilcox =

American golfer

Personal information
- Nationality: United States
- Born: c.1940

Career
- Sport: Golf
- College: Oklahoma State University
- Turned professional: 1962
- Professional wins: 6

Best results in major championships
- Masters Tournament: T21: 1970
- PGA Championship: T7: 1969
- U.S. Open: T34: 1968
- The Open Championship: DNP

Terry Wilcox (born c. 1940) is an American professional golfer.

== Early life and amateur career ==
Wilcox grew up in Ada, Oklahoma. He played college golf at Oklahoma State University, graduating in 1962.

== Professional career ==
In 1962, Wilcox turned professional. He played on the PGA Tour from 1964 to 1974 while also working as a club professional. His best finishes were a T-2 at the 1969 Azalea Open Invitational and a 2nd at the 1970 IVB-Philadelphia Golf Classic. His best finish in a major was a T-7 at the 1969 PGA Championship.

Wilcox served as tournament director of the Kraft Nabisco Championship, an LPGA major at the Mission Hills Country Club in Rancho Mirage, California, from 1994 to 2008.

== Professional wins ==
this list may be incomplete

- 1964 Westchester Open
- 1965 Westchester Open
- 1967 Metropolitan PGA Championship
- 1974 North Carolina Open, Carolinas PGA Championship
- 1976 North Carolina Open

== Results in major championships ==
Tournament	1965	1966	1967	1968	1969	1970	1971
Masters Tournament						T21	CUT
U.S. Open	T28	CUT		CUT	CUT		CUT
PGA Championship				T34	T7		

Note: Wilcox never played in The Open Championship.

Top 10
Did not play

CUT = missed the half-way cut
"T" = tied
