= Jerry Haas =

American professional golfer (born 1963)

Personal information
- Nationality: United States
- Born: September 16, 1963 (age 63) Belleville, Illinois, U.S.
- Height: 5 ft 10 in (1.78 m)
- Weight: 170 lb (77 kg; 12 st)
- Spouse: Elizabeth

Career
- Sport: Golf
- College: Wake Forest University
- Turned professional: 1986
- Current tour: Champions Tour
- Former tours: PGA Tour; Nationwide Tour; European Tour
- Professional wins: 8

Number of wins by tour
- Korn Ferry Tour: 3
- Other: 5

Best results in major championships
- Masters Tournament: T31: 1985
- PGA Championship: CUT: 2006
- U.S. Open: 65th: 1988
- The Open Championship: DNP

Jerry Haas (born September 16, 1963) is an American professional golfer who coaches Wake Forest University's golf team and used to play on the PGA Tour, Nationwide Tour and the European Tour.

== Amateur career ==
In 1963, Haas was born in Belleville, Illinois.

Haas attended Wake Forest University. He won the Illinois Amateur championship in 1982 and 1984 while he attended Wake Forest. In 1985, he was named second team All-American in his final year at Wake and was also selected to the American 1985 Walker Cup team. Haas finished an impressive T-31 at the 1985 Masters Tournament as an amateur.

== Professional career ==
In 1986, Haas turned professional. He played on the European Tour in 1988 and 1989. He finished 57th on the money list in 1989. Haas finished in 3rd at qualifying school in 1989 earning him his PGA Tour card for 1990. He played on the PGA Tour full-time in 1990 and 1991 and split time between the Nationwide Tour and the PGA Tour in 1992. He played on the Nationwide Tour in 1993 and 1994 and won three events on tour in 1994. Those three wins helped earn Haas his PGA Tour card for 1995 but he would have to go back to the Nationwide Tour in 1996.

=== Later life ===
In 1997, Haas stopped playing professionally and spent a year as a commentator for The Golf Channel and also spent time as a teaching professional at the Yorktown Golf Club in his hometown of Belleville, Illinois.

Haas was named the head coach of the Wake Forest Demon Deacons golf team on September 1, 1997, and with the hiring stopped playing professional golf. He rebuilt the Wake Forest golf program and during his time they have seen over 15 All-ACC selections and over 15 individual tournament champions.

== Personal life ==
Haas comes from a distinguished family of golfers. He is a nephew of 1968 Masters winner Bob Goalby, and has several other relations in golf including his brother Jay, nephews Bill and Jay Jr., and brother-in-law Dillard Pruitt. Jerry coached Bill at Wake Forest.

== Amateur wins ==
- 1982 Illinois Amateur
- 1984 Illinois Amateur

== Professional wins (8) ==
=== Nike Tour wins (3) ===
No.	Date	Tournament	Winning score	Margin of victory	Runner-up
1	Aug 14, 1994	Nike Ozarks Open	−16 (69-65-69-69=272)	1 stroke	(United States) Frank Conner
2	Sep 25, 1994	Nike Tri-Cities Open	−13 (69-67-67=203)	1 stroke	(United States) Brad Fabel
3	Oct 2, 1994	Nike Sonoma County Open	−11 (67-68-71-71=277)	2 strokes	(United States) Woody Austin

=== Other wins (5) ===
- 1997 Southern Illinois Open
- 2012 South Carolina Open
- 2014 Carolinas PGA Championship
- 2015 Carolinas Open
- 2018 Carolinas Open

== Results in major championships ==
Tournament	1985	1986	1987	1988	1989
Masters Tournament	T31				
U.S. Open		CUT	CUT	65	
PGA Championship					

Tournament	1990	1991	1992	1993	1994	1995	1996	1997	1998	1999
Masters Tournament										
U.S. Open										
PGA Championship										

Tournament	2000	2001	2002	2003	2004	2005	2006
Masters Tournament							
U.S. Open			CUT				
PGA Championship							CUT

Note: Haas never played in The Open Championship.

Did not play

CUT = missed the half-way cut
"T" = tied

== U.S. national team appearances ==
Amateur

- Walker Cup: 1985 (winners)

== See also ==
- 1989 PGA Tour Qualifying School graduates
- 1990 PGA Tour Qualifying School graduates
- 1994 Nike Tour graduates
