= Bobby Locke =

South African professional golfer

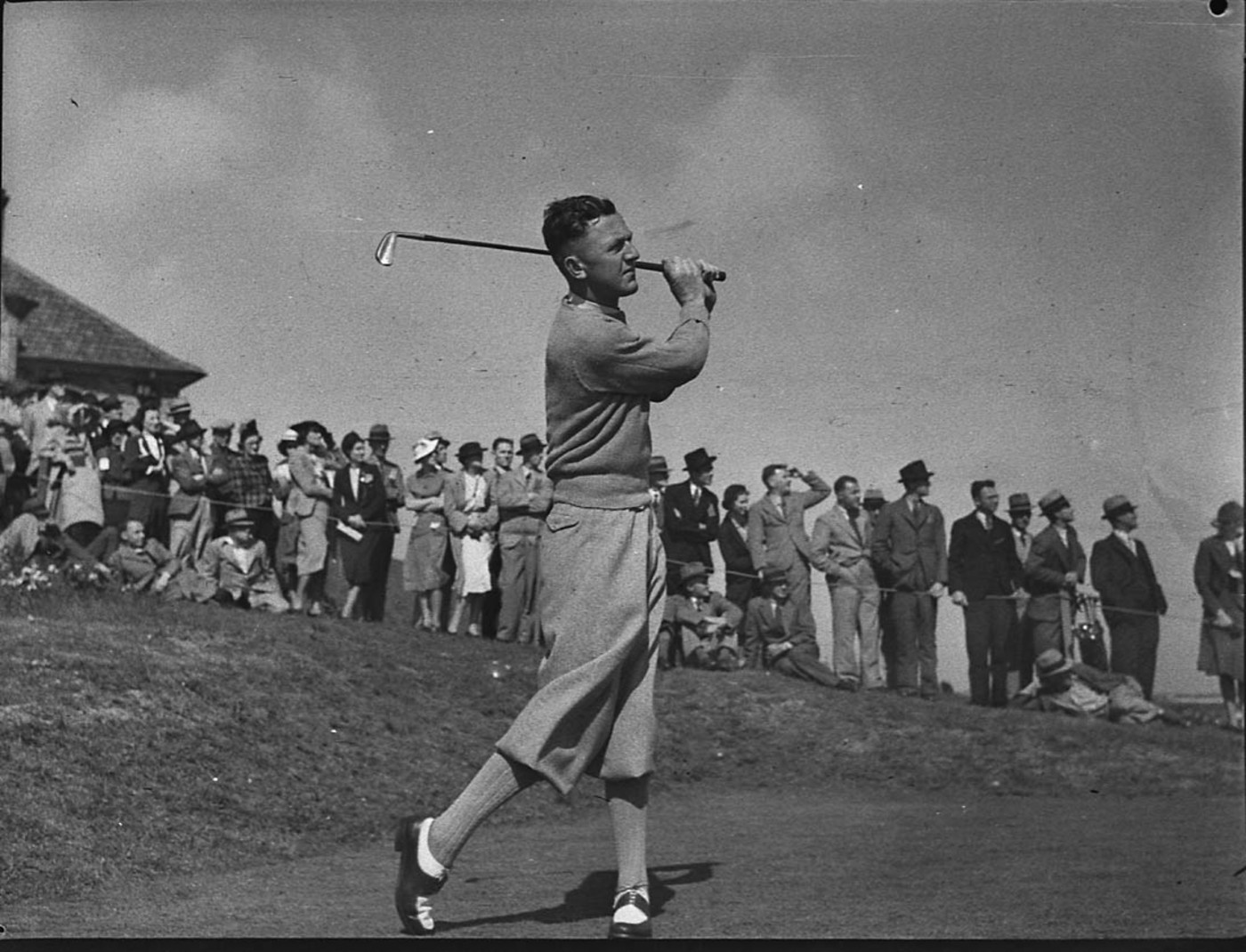
- Locke in Australia (1938)

Personal information
- Full name: Arthur D'Arcy Locke
- Nicknames: Bobby; Old Baggy Pants; Muffin Face; Lantern Jowls; Moon Face
- Nationality: South Africa
- Born: 20 November 1917 Germiston, South Africa
- Died: 9 March 1987 (aged 69) Johannesburg, South Africa
- Spouses: Hester Elizabeth 'Lillian' le Roux (divorced 1952); Mary Elizabeth Fenton (m. 1958–87, his death)
- Children: 2

Career
- Sport: Golf
- Turned professional: 1938
- Former tour: PGA Tour
- Professional wins: 94

Number of wins by tour
- PGA Tour: 15
- Sunshine Tour: 50 (total South African wins)
- Other: 29

Best results in major championships (wins: 4)
- Masters Tournament: T10: 1948
- PGA Championship: T33: 1947
- U.S. Open: 3rd/T3: 1947, 1951
- The Open Championship: Won: 1949, 1950, 1952, 1957
- British Amateur: T33: 1937

Achievements and awards
- World Golf Hall of Fame: 1977 (member page)
- Harry Vardon Trophy: 1946, 1950, 1954

Arthur D'Arcy "Bobby" Locke (20 November 1917 – 9 March 1987) was a South African professional golfer. He is generally regarded as one of the greatest golfers of all time. He won The Open Championship four times and 15 PGA Tour events in total. In addition, he was a prolific tournament winner in South Africa, ultimately recording over 50 significant victories in his home country, including the South African Open nine times.

== Early life ==
Locke was born in Germiston, South Africa the only son of Mr. C.J. and Mrs. O. Locke of 70 Nottingham Road, Kensington, Johannesburg. He obtained his Educational Junior Certificate pass at Benoni High School in 1934.

== Amateur career ==
Locke won the South African Open for the first of nine times in 1935, at the Parkview Golf Club in Johannesburg, with a score of 296, playing as an amateur. He played in his first Open Championship in 1936, when he was 18 years old, and finished as the low amateur.

== Professional career ==
He turned professional in March 1938 at the age of 20 and was engaged by the Maccauvlei Country Club as club professional in December 1939. Problems arose when Locke wanted to give lessons to non-members as well as take leave of absence, without advance request, to take part in outside competitions such as the U.S. Open. Locke resigned from the club, by letter, on 26 July 1940. His golf career was interrupted by service in the South African Air Force during World War II.

=== PGA Tour ===
Following the end of World War II, Locke successfully resumed his career in South Africa in 1946. He hosted Sam Snead, one of the top American golfers of the day, for a series of exhibition matches in South Africa in January/February 1947, winning 12 out of the 16 matches, two were halved and Snead won two. So impressed was Snead that he suggested that Locke come to the United States and give the PGA Tour a try, advice that Locke quickly followed.

Locke arrived in the U.S. for the first time in April 1947, well after the American Tour season had begun. In two-and-a-half years on the PGA Tour, Locke played in 59 events; he won 11, and finished in the top three in 30, just over half. In 1947, despite a late start, Locke dominated the American tour, winning six tournaments (including four in a five-week period), and finishing second to Jimmy Demaret on the money list.

In 1948, he won the Chicago Victory National by 16 strokes, which remains a PGA Tour record for margin of victory (tied for margin of victory with J. Douglas Edgar's win in the 1919 Canadian Open).

The following year, Locke was banned from the tour, ostensibly because of a dispute over playing commitments. Locke had indeed given several advance commitments to appear at tournaments and exhibitions, then had not turned up nor given adequate notice nor explanations for his absences. However, the 1948 Masters champion Claude Harmon stated, unsolicited, to another golf personality during that era: "Locke was simply too good. They had to ban him." The ban was lifted in March 1950. However, Locke chose not to return to play in the United States, except for a few isolated appearances.

Locke explained his point of view and events leading up to the banning. He stated that he had accepted invitations, organised through the PGA to play in two local tournaments, The Inverness Fourball and Western Open. He explained how he had been helped to iron out a putting problem which led to him winning the 1949 Open Championship. He gives the "Open" win as one of his reasons to breach his contract. The text indicates that he understood the contractual nature of his dealings with the PGA.

=== Worldwide success ===
After leaving the PGA Tour, Locke continued his career in Europe and Africa, where he felt more comfortable. He won 23 times in Europe, most notably a quartet of successes in The Open Championship, which came in 1949, 1950, 1952 and 1957. He was the first of many South Africans who subsequently won major championships, including Gary Player, Ernie Els, Retief Goosen, Trevor Immelman, Louis Oosthuizen and Charl Schwartzel. His win in the 1957 Open Championship was with some controversy. Locke had failed to properly replace his ball after marking on the 72nd green, and proceeded to putt out. This had been confirmed through newsreel footage provided to the Royal and Ancient after the trophy presentation. The rules at the time made no provision for a two shot penalty, thus Locke's win could have been overturned through disqualification. However, the Championship committee did not enforce the disqualification rule, citing "equity and spirit of the game" as overriding factors in sustaining the posted result.

During this time Locke also played many other parts of the world. In 1955 he won the Australian Open held at Gailes Golf Club in Queensland; he later rated this as one of the best courses he had ever played. In 1959, Locke was involved in a serious car accident. Medical issues related to this incident contributed to the end of his career.

== Playing attributes ==
Locke built his success around his putting ability that coins the phrase "You drive for show, but putt for dough." Wearing his trademark knickerbockers, white shoes, and stockings, Locke played the game at a slow and deliberate pace, which caused frustration among some American professionals. While being on the Greens, Locke was highly proficient, using a distinctive putting style. He would bring the putter back far to the inside on the backstroke, then trap the ball with a hooded, closed clubface on the forward stroke, imparting significant over spin. Combined with his skill for reading breaks, this approach yielded highly consistent results. Locke believed he could put spin on putts (similar to full-swing shots) to make them "hook" and "slice," and he used his unorthodox technique to considerable success.

Locke was not particularly long from the tee, but placed great emphasis on accuracy in hitting fairways and greens; he employed an extreme right-to-left ball flight (one that bordered on a hook) on nearly every full shot.

Australian contemporary pro Jim Ferrier, who played the U.S. Tour during the late 1940s with Locke, described Locke's putting method as being designed to overcome the very heavy grain present on many Bermuda-grass greens of that era, particularly in warm-climate regions such as South Africa and the southern United States. In these regions, greens had to be constructed during that era using Bermuda-grass turf in order to survive the extreme summer heat; turfgrass research eventually developed a wider variety of strains which could be used. Locke's putting method allowed the ball to glide on top of the grass without being affected very much by the grain. Ferrier explained that Locke had apparently learned the technique from an Englishman in Egypt, while he was stationed there during World War II. Locke had in fact learned the technique from Walter Hagen during the "Haigs" tour of South Africa with Joe Kirkwood Sr. in 1938.

== Military service ==
Locke served in the South African Air Force during World War II. His Official War Record is held at the South African Department of Defence archives under his Service No: 103940. Those records show that he first trained as a pilot and later a pilot instructor. He was deployed to the Middle East from December 1944 to May 1945, and then to Italy, post VE Day, on transport duties until August 1945. He was honourably discharged in October 1945 having attained the rank of 2nd Lieutenant. He received the Italy Star and 1939-45 War Medal/Africa Service Medal.

=== Alternate descriptions of Locke's war record ===
Other descriptions of Locke's war record suggest he was more active than the transport duties he undertook, with SAAF Number 31 Squadron in Italy, that are described by the official SANDF archives. The descriptions include: he spent twelve months in a Liberator Squadron in Italy he was a bomber pilot who bombed Monte Casino, he fought for Britain as a bomber pilot; he flew over 100 missions over Europe with the SAAF; and 'served with distinction as a Royal Air Force Bomber pilot'. Locke also claims that:

- In a photograph of him and others, he was playing golf at Gizeh Golf & Country Club, in Cairo, in 1943, and
- "My stay in the Air Force lasted five years and three months, in which time I completed 1,800 hours on single-, twin- and four-engined aircraft"

== Personal life ==
Following the car crash that ended his competitive career in 1960, Locke suffered from migraines and eye problems, although he continued competing occasionally after that, without much success.

Mental health issues followed, including bouts of depression, alcoholism and even an attempted murder charge following a dispute with a decorator, Big Boy Ndlovu. Locke considered Ndlovu's work below par and refused to pay the 220 rand Ndlovu asked for. Following an argument, Locke shot Ndlovu in the shoulder. Locke was fined 120 rand and had his gun licence suspended for six months.

== Death ==
In March 1987, Locke died of meningitis in Johannesburg, South Africa.

After his death, his wife Mary and daughter Carolyn became reclusive and died together in a suicide pact at their home in 2000, aged 80 and 40 respectively.

== Awards and honors ==
- Locke won the Harry Vardon Trophy, awarded to the lowest scorer in the British PGA, three times: in 1946, 1950, and 1954.
- In 1977, Locke was elected to the World Golf Hall of Fame.

== Amateur wins ==
- 1931 South Africa Boys
- 1935 South African Amateur, Natal Amateur, Transvaal Amateur
- 1936 Natal Amateur, Lucifer Empire Trophy
- 1937 South African Amateur, Transvaal Amateur, Orange Free State Amateur

== Professional wins (94) ==
=== PGA Tour wins (12) ===
Legend
Major championships (3)
Other PGA Tour (9)

No.	Date	Tournament	Winning score	Margin of victory	Runner(s)-up
1	11 May 1947	Houston Open	−11 (71-67-70-69=277)	5 strokes	(United States) Johnny Palmer, (United States) Ellsworth Vines
2	25 May 1947	Philadelphia Inquirer Open	−7 (68-69-70-70=277)	4 strokes	(United States) Matt Kowal, (United States) Lloyd Mangrum
3	1 Jun 1947	Goodall Round Robin	+37 points	4 points	(United States) Vic Ghezzi
4	8 Jul 1947	All American Open	−12 (66-68-71-71=276)	Playoff	(United States) Ed Oliver
5	19 Jul 1947	Canadian Open	−16 (68-66-67-67=268)	2 strokes	(United States) Ed Oliver
6	27 Jul 1947	Columbus Invitational	−14 (70-68-67-69=274)	5 strokes	(United States) Jimmy Demaret
7	25 Jan 1948	Phoenix Open	−16 (65-69-67-67=268)	1 stroke	(United States) Jimmy Demaret
8	20 Jun 1948	Chicago Victory National Open	−18 (65-65-70-66=266)	16 strokes	(United States) Ellsworth Vines
9	9 Jul 1949	**The Open Championship**	−5 (69-76-68-70=283)	Playoff	(Republic of Ireland) Harry Bradshaw
10	7 Jul 1950	**The Open Championship** (2)	−1 (69-72-70-68=279)	2 strokes	(Argentina) Roberto De Vicenzo
11	9 Aug 1950	All American Open (2)	−6 (72-74-69-67=282)	Playoff	(United States) Lloyd Mangrum
12	11 Jul 1952	**The Open Championship** (3)	−1 (69-71-74-73=287)	1 stroke	(Australia) Peter Thomson

PGA Tour playoff record (4–0)

No.	Year	Tournament	Opponent	Result
1	1947	All American Open	(United States) Ed Oliver	Won 36-hole playoff; Locke: −4 (68-72=140), Oliver: +2 (71-75=146)
2	1949	Cavalier Specialists Invitational	(United States) Frank Stranahan (a)	Won 18-hole playoff; Locke: −1 (68), Stranahan: +1 (70)
3	1949	**The Open Championship**	(Republic of Ireland) Harry Bradshaw	Won 36-hole playoff; Locke: −9 (67-68=135), Bradshaw: +3 (74-73=147)
4	1950	All American Open	(United States) Lloyd Mangrum	Won 18-hole playoff; Locke: −3 (69), Mangrum: +1 (73)

=== Other North American wins (8) ===
- 1947 Carolinas Open, Carolinas PGA Championship
- 1948 Carolinas Open
- 1949 Cavalier Specialists Invitational, Goodall Round Robin
- 1952 Mexican Open, Carolinas Open
- 1959 New Hampshire Open

=== South Africa wins (50) ===
- 1935 Natal Open, South African Open (both as an amateur)
- 1936 Natal Open (as an amateur)
- 1937 South African Open, Transvaal Open (both as an amateur)
- 1938 South African Open, South Africa Professional, Transvaal Open
- 1939 South African Open, South Africa Professional, Transvaal Open
- 1940 South African Open, South Africa Professional, Transvaal Open
- 1946 South African Open, South Africa Professional, Transvaal Open
- 1949 Stanley Motors 1,000 Guineas Tournament, Transvaal Open
- 1950 Dunlop £1.000 Tournament, Stanley Motors 1,000 Guineas Tournament, Transvaal Open, Western Transvaal Open, Grey Slax £1,000 Tournament, South Africa Professional, South African Open, Grey Slax £1,000 Tournament
- 1951 Stag £1,000 Matchplay, Stanley Motors 1,000 Guineas Tournament, Transvaal Open, East Rand Open, South Africa Professional, South African Open, Dunlop Masters £1,000 Tournament
- 1952 Stag £1,000 Matchplay, Stanley Motors 1,000 Guineas Tournament
- 1953 SANTA Open, Natal Open
- 1954 SANTA Open, Transvaal Open, Mills 1,000 Guineas Tournament
- 1955 Transvaal Open, South African Open, South Africa Professional
- 1956 Western Province Open
- 1957 East Rand Open
- 1958 Transvaal Open, Western Province Open, East Rand Open (tie with Eric Moore)
- 1960 East Rand Open

=== Other wins (24) ===
- 1938 Irish Open, New Zealand Open
- 1939 Dutch Open
- 1946 Yorkshire Evening News Tournament, Brand-Lochryn Tournament, Dunlop Masters
- 1950 Dunlop Tournament, Spalding Tournament, North British-Harrogate Tournament
- 1952 French Open, Lotus Tournament
- 1953 French Open
- 1954 Egyptian Open, German Open, Swiss Open, Dunlop Tournament, Dunlop British Masters (tie with Jimmy Adams), Egyptian Match Play, Swallow-Harrogate Tournament (Stroke play stage)
- 1955 Australian Open
- 1957 Daks Tournament, Bowmaker Tournament (tied with Frank Jowle), **Open Championship**
- 1959 Bowmaker Tournament

Professional major championship is shown in bold.

== Major championships ==
=== Wins (4) ===
Year	Championship	54 holes	Winning score	Margin	Runner-up
1949	The Open Championship	Tied for lead	−5 (69-76-68-70=283)	Playoff ^{1}	(Republic of Ireland) Harry Bradshaw
1950	The Open Championship (2)	Tied for lead	−1 (69-72-70-68=279)	2 strokes	(Argentina) Roberto De Vicenzo
1952	The Open Championship (3)	1 shot deficit	−1 (69-71-74-73=287)	1 stroke	(Australia) Peter Thomson
1957	The Open Championship (4)	3 shot lead	−9 (69-72-68-70=279)	3 strokes	(Australia) Peter Thomson

^{1} Defeated Harry Bradshaw in 36-hole playoff: Locke (135), Bradshaw (147)

=== Results timeline ===
Tournament	1936	1937	1938	1939
Masters Tournament				
U.S. Open				
The Open Championship	T8 LA	T17 LA	T10	T9
PGA Championship				
The Amateur Championship	R256	R64	–	–

Tournament	1940	1941	1942	1943	1944	1945	1946	1947	1948	1949
Masters Tournament				NT	NT	NT		T14	T10	T13
U.S. Open			NT	NT	NT	NT		T3	4	T4
The Open Championship	NT	NT	NT	NT	NT	NT	T2			1
PGA Championship				NT				T33		

Tournament	1950	1951	1952	1953	1954	1955	1956	1957	1958	1959
Masters Tournament			T21							
U.S. Open		3	WD	T14	5					
The Open Championship	1	T6	1	8	T2	4	CUT	1	T16	T29
PGA Championship										

Tournament	1960	1961	1962	1963	1964	1965	1966	1967	1968	1969
Masters Tournament										
U.S. Open										
The Open Championship		CUT	CUT	CUT	CUT			CUT		
PGA Championship										

Tournament	1970	1971	1972	1973	1974	1975	1976	1977	1978
Masters Tournament									
U.S. Open									
The Open Championship	CUT	T49	CUT		CUT	CUT	CUT	WD	CUT
PGA Championship									

Win
Top 10
Did not play

NT = No tournament
LA = Low amateur
CUT = missed the half-way cut
WD = Withdrew
"T" indicates a tie for a place

Sources: 1936 Amateur Championship, 1937 Amateur Championship

=== Summary ===
Tournament	Wins	2nd	3rd	Top-5	Top-10	Top-25	Events	Cuts made
Masters Tournament	0	0	0	0	1	4	4	4
U.S. Open	0	0	2	5	5	6	7	6
The Open Championship	4	2	0	7	12	14	29	16
PGA Championship	0	0	0	0	0	0	1	1
Totals	4	2	2	12	18	24	41	27

- Most consecutive cuts made – 19 (1936 Open Championship – 1952 Masters)
- Longest streak of top-10s – 5 (1949 U.S. Open – 1951 Open Championship)

== Team appearances ==
- South African Amateur Golf Team to England 1937.
- Canada Cup (representing South Africa): 1953, 1954, 1956, 1960
- Slazenger Trophy (representing British Commonwealth and Empire): 1956
- Hopkins Trophy (representing Canada): 1952, 1953, 1954

== See also ==
- List of men's major championships winning golfers
