= Johnny Palmer =

American professional golfer (1918–2006)

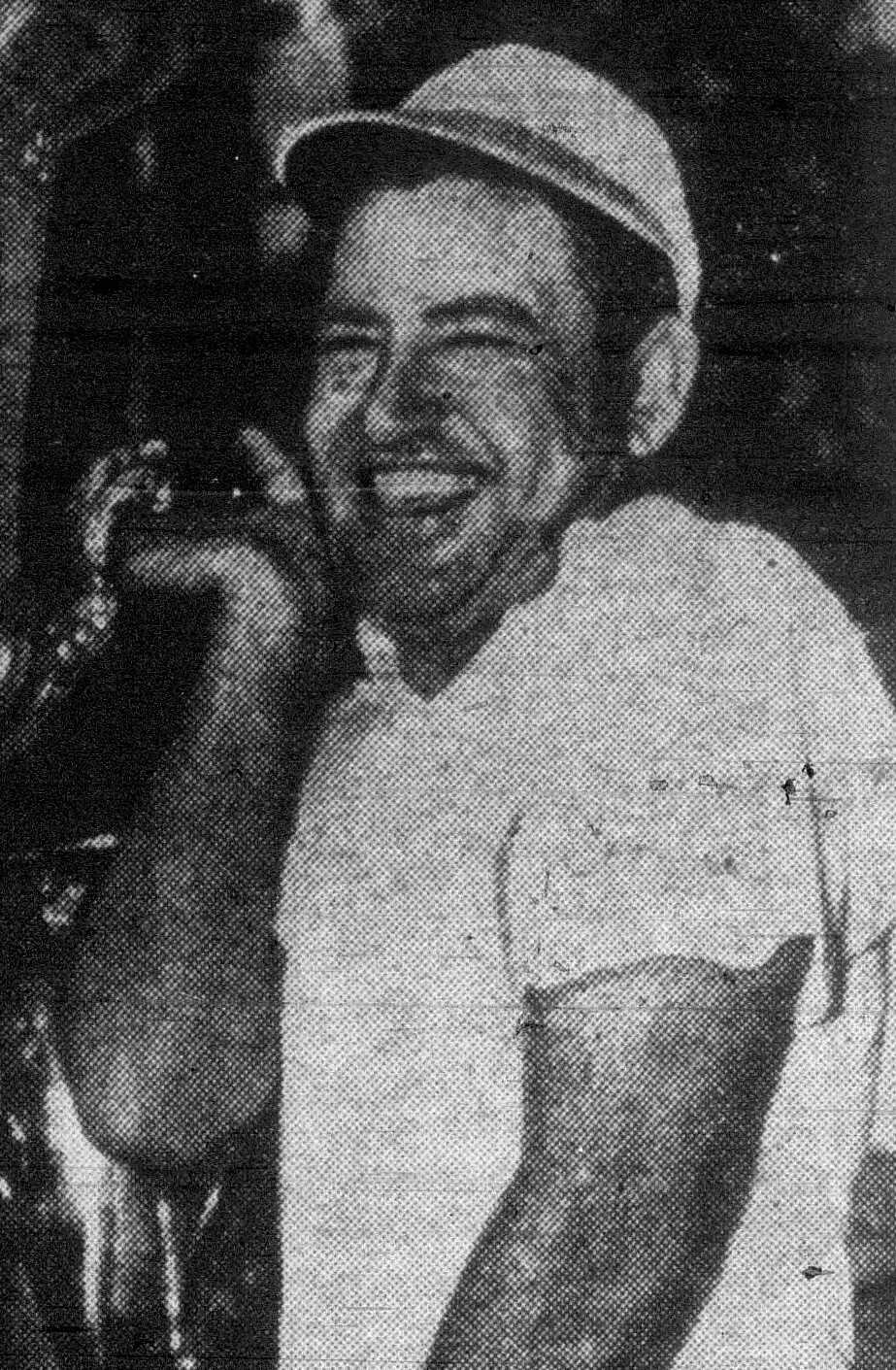
- Palmer in 1949

Personal information
- Full name: John Cornelius Palmer
- Nationality: United States
- Born: July 3, 1918 Eldorado, North Carolina, U.S.
- Died: September 14, 2006 (aged 88) Albemarle, North Carolina, U.S.

Career
- Sport: Golf
- Turned professional: 1938
- Former tour: PGA Tour
- Professional wins: 18

Number of wins by tour
- PGA Tour: 7
- Other: 11

Best results in major championships
- Masters Tournament: T4: 1949
- PGA Championship: 2nd: 1949
- U.S. Open: T6: 1947
- The Open Championship: DNP

John Cornelius Palmer (July 3, 1918 – September 14, 2006) was an American professional golfer.

== Career ==
Born in Eldorado, North Carolina, Palmer won seven times on the PGA Tour in the 1940s and 1950s, and was a member of the Ryder Cup team 1949.

Palmer died in Albemarle, North Carolina, at the age of 88.

== Professional wins (18) ==
=== PGA Tour wins (7) ===
No.	Date	Tournament	Winning score	Margin of victory	Runner(s)-up
1	Sep 16, 1946	Nashville Invitational	−18 (68-67-63-68=266)	Playoff	(United States) Dutch Harrison
2	Sep 1, 1947	Western Open	−18 (67-70-64-69=270)	1 stroke	(South Africa) Bobby Locke, (United States) Ed Oliver
3	May 16, 1948	Philadelphia Inquirer Open	−7 (71-69-73-68=281)	4 strokes	(United States) Ben Hogan
4	Feb 20, 1949	Houston Open	−16 (67-67-71-67=272)	1 stroke	(United States) Cary Middlecoff
5	Aug 15, 1949	World Championship of Golf	−13 (67-69-69-70=275)	Playoff	(United States) Jimmy Demaret
6	Jul 19, 1952	Canadian Open	−25 (66-65-66-66=263)	11 strokes	(United States) Fred Haas, (United States) Dick Mayer
7	May 30, 1954	Colonial National Invitation	E (70-72-69-69=280)	2 strokes	(United States) Fred Haas

PGA Tour playoff record (2–1)

No.	Year	Tournament	Opponent(s)	Result
1	1946	Nashville Invitational	(United States) Dutch Harrison	Won 18-hole playoff; Palmer: −2 (69), Harrison: −1 (70)
2	1948	Portland Open Invitational	(United States) Fred Haas, (United States) Ben Hogan	Haas won 18-hole playoff; Haas: −2 (70), Hogan: −1 (71), Palmer: +2 (75)
3	1949	World Championship of Golf	(United States) Jimmy Demaret	Won 18-hole playoff; Palmer: −4 (68), Demaret: −2 (70)

=== Other wins (11) ===
this list may be incomplete

- 1941 Carolinas Open
- 1947 Utah Open
- 1948 Carolinas PGA Championship
- 1949 Carolinas Open, Carolinas PGA Championship
- 1950 Carolinas Open
- 1951 Carolinas PGA Championship
- 1952 Carolinas PGA Championship
- 1954 Mexican Open, Carolinas PGA Championship
- 1957 Oklahoma Open

== Results in major championships ==
Tournament	1941	1942	1943	1944	1945	1946	1947	1948	1949
Masters Tournament		T26	NT	NT	NT	T32	T17	T28	T4
U.S. Open	T21	NT	NT	NT	NT	T35	T6	T35	T8
PGA Championship			NT					R32	2

Tournament	1950	1951	1952	1953	1954	1955	1956	1957	1958	1959	1960
Masters Tournament	T24	T30	12	13	T33	T18	11	T24			
U.S. Open	T10	T24				T34			CUT		CUT
PGA Championship	QF	R64	R64	R64	R32	QF	R64	R64	CUT		

Note: Palmer never played in The Open Championship.

Top 10
Did not play

NT = no tournament
CUT = missed the half-way cut (3rd round cut in 1958 PGA Championship)
R64, R32, R16, QF, SF = round in which player lost in PGA Championship match play
"T" indicates a tie for a place

=== Summary ===
Tournament	Wins	2nd	3rd	Top-5	Top-10	Top-25	Events	Cuts made
Masters Tournament	0	0	0	1	1	8	13	13
U.S. Open	0	0	0	0	3	5	10	8
The Open Championship	0	0	0	0	0	0	0	0
PGA Championship	0	1	0	3	3	5	11	10
Totals	0	1	0	4	7	18	34	31

- Most consecutive cuts made – 31 (1941 U.S. Open – 1957 Masters)
- Longest streak of top-10s – 3 (1949 Masters – 1949 PGA)
