= Buck White (golfer) =

American professional golfer (1911–1982)

Personal information
- Full name: Emmett O'Neal White
- Nationality: United States
- Born: February 7, 1911 Memphis, Tennessee
- Died: January 23, 1982 (aged 70) Gulfport, Mississippi

Career
- Sport: Golf
- Status: Professional
- Former tour: PGA Tour
- Professional wins: 5

Number of wins by tour
- PGA Tour: 3

Best results in major championships
- Masters Tournament: T42: 1950
- PGA Championship: T9: 1953, 1957
- U.S. Open: T6: 1949
- The Open Championship: DNP

Emmett O'Neal "Buck" White (February 7, 1911 – January 23, 1982) was an American professional golfer who played on the PGA Tour.

== Career ==
White was born in Memphis, Tennessee. White won three times on the PGA Tour between 1946 and 1951.

In 1961, White was the first golfer to shoot 63 in the PGA Seniors' Championship, a tournament scoring record that wasn't broken until 2012.

Following his retirement from competitive golf, White worked as a golf instructor in the Miami, Florida, area, where he taught many players including a number of PGA Tour professionals.

== Professional wins (5) ==
=== PGA Tour wins (3) ===
No.	Date	Tournament	Winning score	Margin of victory	Runner(s)-up
1	Sep 22, 1946	Memphis Invitational	−11 (65-68-70-74=277)	1 stroke	(United States) Herman Keiser
2	Aug 19, 1951	Sioux City Open	−16 (68-69-71-64=272)	2 strokes	(United States) Jack Burke Jr., (United States) Ed Oliver, (United States) Skee Riegel
3	Sep 9, 1951	Empire State Open	E (70-70-72-72=284)	2 strokes	(United States) Doug Ford

=== Other wins (2) ===
this list may be incomplete

- 1944 Kentucky Open
- 1947 Michigan Open
