= Clayton Heafner =

American professional golfer (1914–1960)

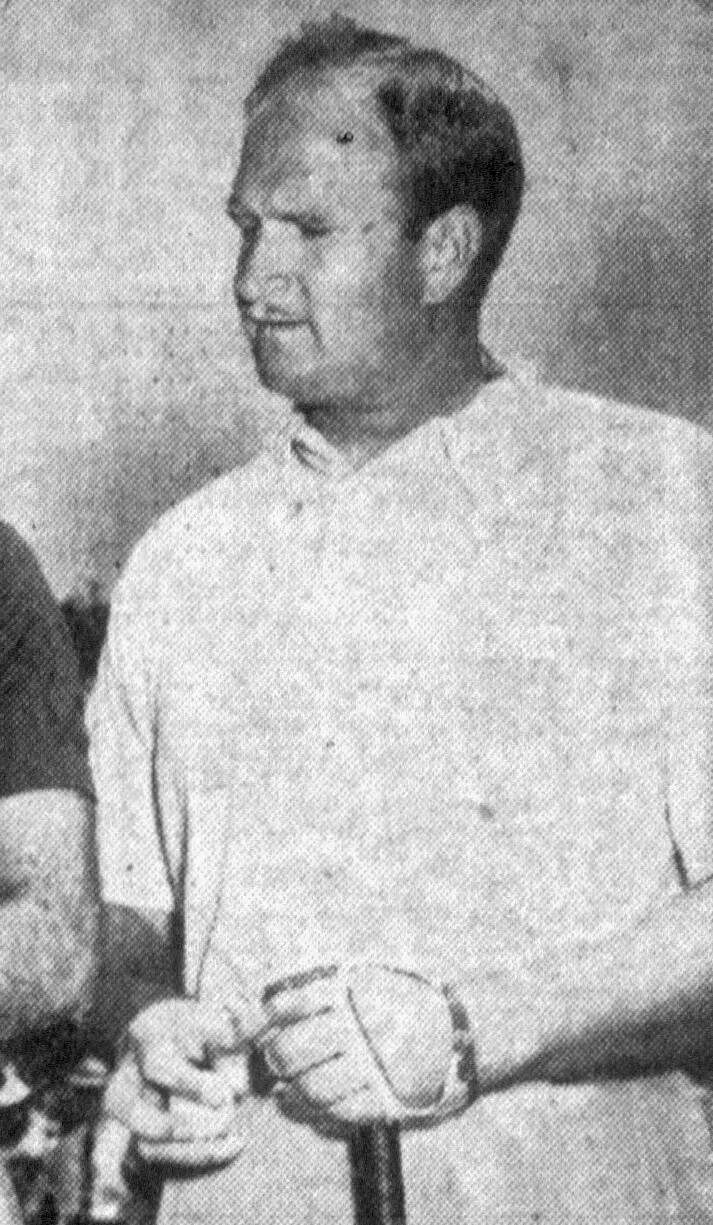
- Heafner, circa 1949

Personal information
- Full name: Clayton Vance Heafner
- Nationality: United States
- Born: July 20, 1914 Charlotte, North Carolina, U.S.
- Died: December 31, 1960 (aged 46) Charlotte, North Carolina, U.S.

Career
- Sport: Golf
- Status: Professional
- Former tour: PGA Tour
- Professional wins: 7

Number of wins by tour
- PGA Tour: 4
- Other: 3

Best results in major championships
- Masters Tournament: T7: 1946, 1950
- PGA Championship: T5: 1949
- U.S. Open: 2nd/T2: 1949, 1951
- The Open Championship: DNP

Clayton Vance Heafner (July 20, 1914 – December 31, 1960) was an American professional golfer.

== Career ==
Heafner was born in Charlotte, North Carolina.

Heafner won four times on the PGA Tour, played on two Ryder Cup teams, and finished runner-up in the 1949 and 1951 U.S. Opens. Often described as “fiery” and as a “fierce competitor”, Heafner played on two victorious Ryder Cup teams, in 1949 and 1951, with a four-match record of 3–0–1. In the 1949 match, the U.S. was without Ben Hogan, Byron Nelson and Cary Middlecoff, but Heafner keyed a winning rally from a 3–1 team deficit by beating Dick Burton, 3 and 2.

He finished second in the 1951 U.S. Open to Ben Hogan.

Heafner was also a key figure in helping Charlie Sifford break the color barrier on the PGA Tour, by playing matches against him on Mondays and providing counsel Sifford carried with him through his playing days.

== Personal life ==
Heafner's son, Vance Heafner, was also a professional golfer. When Vance played in the 1978 Masters Tournament they became one of nine father-son duos to play in the event. Clayton and Vance are also only one of five father-son combinations to win a PGA Tour event.

In 1960, Heafner died in Charlotte, North Carolina.

== Awards and honors ==
- In 1974, Heafner was inducted into the North Carolina Sports Hall of Fame.
- In 2006, he was inducted into the Greater Charlotte Sports Hall of Fame.

== Professional wins ==
=== PGA Tour wins (4) ===
- 1941 Mahoning Valley Open
- 1942 Mahoning Valley Open
- 1947 Jacksonville Open
- 1948 Colonial National Invitation

=== Other wins (3) ===
this list may be incomplete

- 1939 Carolinas Open
- 1950 Carolinas PGA Championship
- 1953 Carolinas Open

== Results in major championships ==
Tournament	1939	1940	1941	1942	1943	1944	1945	1946	1947	1948	1949	1950	1951	1952	1953
Masters Tournament		WD	T12		NT	NT	NT	T7	T29		T8	T7	T20	T24	WD
U.S. Open	T16	WD	T21	NT	NT	NT	NT	T12	CUT	CUT	T2	WD	2	WD	T26
PGA Championship					NT			R64	R32		QF		R64		

Note: Heafner never played in The Open Championship.

Top 10
Did not play

NT = no tournament
WD = withdrew
CUT = missed the half-way cut
R64, R32, R16, QF, SF = round in which player lost in PGA Championship match play
"T" indicates a tie for a place

=== Summary ===
Tournament	Wins	2nd	3rd	Top-5	Top-10	Top-25	Events	Cuts made
Masters Tournament	0	0	0	0	3	6	9	7
U.S. Open	0	2	0	2	2	5	11	6
The Open Championship	0	0	0	0	0	0	0	0
PGA Championship	0	0	0	1	1	2	4	4
Totals	0	2	0	3	6	13	24	17

- Most consecutive cuts made – 8 (1949 Masters – 1952 Masters)
- Longest streak of top-10s – 4 (1949 Masters – 1950 Masters)
