= Trump National Golf Club Westchester =

Private golf club in Briarcliff Manor, New York

- Interactive map of Trump National Golf Club Westchester

Club information
- Location: Briarcliff Manor, New York, U.S.
- Established: 1922
- Type: Private
- Owner: The Trump Organization
- Total holes: 18
- Website: Official website
- Designed by: Jim Fazio
- Par: 72
- Length: 7200
- 41°08′46″N 73°50′00″W

Trump National Golf Club Westchester is a private golf club in Briarcliff Manor, New York. The 140-acre (57 ha) course has eighteen holes, with a 75,000-square-foot (7,000 m^{2}) clubhouse. Founded in 1922 as Briarcliff Country Club, it later operated as Briar Hills Country Club and Briar Hall Golf and Country Club. Donald Trump purchased the property in 1996 and renamed the club after its county, Westchester, in a similar manner to his other golf properties. He had the clubhouse and course rebuilt for its 2002 reopening; the course was designed by Jim Fazio. Donald Trump served as president over Trump National Golf Club LLC (managing the Westchester club) from August 2000 until January 19, 2017, the day before his inauguration.

== History ==
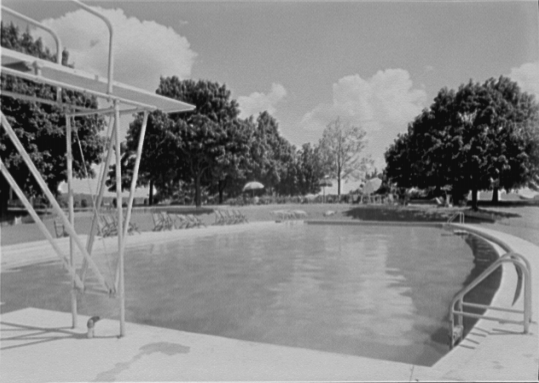
Briar Hills pool, c. 1940

The club had its origins around 1895, with Briarcliff founder Walter W. Law's private nine-hole course on his estate, which became available to Briarcliff Lodge guests, and was then known as the Briarcliff Golf Club. In 1922, Devereux Emmet designed a course across the street with eighteen holes, and thus Briarcliff Country Club was founded that year. The name was changed in 1927 to avoid confusion, to Briar Hills Country Club. Briar Hills opened in May 1929 with a new clubhouse; construction began in May 1928 and utilized local stones for the building's exterior. The interior was noted for its design and spaciousness. In 1936, A. W. Tillinghast redesigned the course. In 1948, Henry Law's son Theodore sold the club to local businessmen who renamed it Briar Hall Golf and Country Club. The 1964 Metropolitan Open was hosted at Briar Hall; Jack Patroni won the championship. In 1980, ownership of the club changed hands again.

Henry Law, a son of village founder Walter W. Law, was among Briar Hill's founders. Among the club's directors were Henry Law and his son Theodore Gilman Law; Gene Sarazen was the club's golf professional in 1923–24, followed by 1952 PGA Champion Jim Turnesa.

=== Trump's purchase and redevelopment ===
At the time of Briar Hall's 1996 sale, the club had an 18-hole, 6,313 yards (5,773 m) golf course and 78,782 square feet (7,319 m^{2}) clubhouse, seven tennis courts, an in-ground swimming pool, pro shop, maintenance building, and pool house. Briar Hall had been taken over by the Marine Midland Bank, which then sold the property to Trump. Trump bought Briar Hall Country Club for $7.5 million in the foreclosure in December 1996 and ran the club until 1999, until he closed the property to begin its redevelopment. The first general manager of the club, Chief Operating Officer Carolyn Kepcher, later became co-host on Trump's television show The Apprentice. She was fired from the show and management position in August 2006.

On March 16, 1999, Briarcliff was operating its mayoral election, and incumbent mayor Keith Austin ran unopposed. Write-ins supporting lawyer Richard Mattiaccio prompted a conflict involving hundreds of residents, which led to one arrest. The event took place near the polls at the Village Hall; Mattiaccio had gained supporters by criticizing Austin's weak opposition to Trump's club reconstruction plans. Many residents believed a large project would congest streets with construction vehicles and rip up the landscape. In redesigning the club and its course, Trump hired golf course architect Jim Fazio, brother of Tom Fazio in the same profession. Around the same time, the workmen resodded a village soccer field and assisted in constructing a new veterans' memorial in Briarcliff. He also had the current 75,000-square-foot (7,000 m^{2}) white clapboard and fieldstone clubhouse built on the property. At one time, due to residents' criticism, the clubhouse was reduced to 35,000-square-foot (3,300 m^{2}), eliminating guest rooms and special event halls. It was designed by Robert Lamb Hart Planners & Architects, and included three stories with lockers, a 150-seat restaurant, and top-floor lounge. Other difficulties with the club's plans arose; the village planning board recognized villager concerns over golf tournaments, membership requirements, and pesticide use. And at the time of the club's reconstruction, Trump had three other golf clubs planned, including one in Seven Springs, an area within three towns which would require approval from all three, and one in the French Hill section of Yorktown. Trump later dropped all of the plans, calling Westchester County "the toughest place to build on the planet".

=== Reopening and further events ===
The first head golf professional was Frank Graniero. The club's first nine holes opened on April 15, 2002, followed by the next nine on June 29, 2002. The club had a total cost of $30 million or $40 million, and was claimed to be the largest excavation project in Westchester County's history, with about 3,000,000-cubic-yard (2,300,000 m^{3}) of earth moved. The thirteenth hole cost Trump $7 million, surrounded by an artificial 101-foot (31 m) black granite waterfall, which pumps 5,000 US gallons (18,900 L) a minute.

In 2003 Trump tried to move the Sybase Classic, a LPGA tournament, from Wykagyl Country Club to Westchester for 2007, as the tournament’s agreement with Wykagl was to expire. Briarcliff Manor's mayor Peter Chatzky was opposed to the plan; Trump attempted to persuade the mayor to talk to his wife, Jean Chatzky, about the financial benefit of hosting the tournament, adding that village residents would be hired for the event. A Trump Organization vice president suggested donating some proceeds to the Briarcliff Manor Public Library's then-proposed expansion or toward improving a village baseball field. The club's special-use permit with the village restricted the course to 300 people and banned large-scale tournaments from taking place there. The discussion between the Trump Organization and village government stopped that year, however in 2004, Trump submitted a new request to bring a LPGA or PGA tournament to the club. (The Sybase Classic would eventually be moved to Upper Montclair Country Club in New Jersey before its cancellation after the 2009 playing.)

A storm in June 2011 caused public utilities including the Briarcliff library and Law Memorial Park's public pool and playing fields to be flooded. When Trump had renovated the course, his workers made unauthorized changes to its drainage system, which made the course look and play better for golfers. The alterations lowered the system's water capacity and thus raised water levels by about six feet. The Trump Organization met with the village over the issue, though it did not take corrective actions. After negotiations ended, the village billed the club $238,353. The Trump Organization blamed the flooding on a village drainage pipe which lacked a grate, and blamed the conflict on then-Briarcliff mayor William Vescio, who owns a company that previously came into conflict with Trump. Vescio denied the relation to the previous conflict and claimed that the flooding was caused by rocks and trees at washed down the hill from the golf club.

When President Obama was in Westchester in 2014, his staff attempted to schedule visits to local golf clubs including Trump National, none of which wanted to close their courses for the president to play. Trump replied to NBC 4 New York's report of the news with a widely circulated and publicized tweet—"If Obama resigns from office NOW, thereby doing a great service to the country—I will give him free lifetime golf at any one of my courses!" In 2015, the club sued the town of Ossining to lower its worth from $13.5 million to $1.4 million in order to reduce property and school taxes; local residents complained because their own taxes would rise. In 2016, the club revised its claims to $9 million, closer to the 2014 town estimate of $14.3 million. In June 2017, Trump disclosed a value of the club at over $50 million, with $9.7 million in personal income in 2016.

Daniel Scavino began working at Briar Hall Country Club as a caddie in 1990, while in high school. He was promoted several times, including to general manager of the club after Trump's purchase. After serving as social media director for Trump's presidential campaign, he became Assistant to the President and Director of Social Media in December 2016. Trump's candidacy for the 2016 United States presidential election affected the club; Horace Greeley High School used the facility for its annual proms, which was protested by its students in late 2015 due to its connection to Trump as a political candidate. The location for the 2016 prom has yet to be changed by student decision. In the following year, it was reported that Pleasantville High School's graduating class was considering changing its prom venue from Trump's club as well. The graduating class voted, 97–44, to keep the venue. On June 7, 2016, Trump gave his nomination victory speech at the clubhouse; he had just won the Republican primaries.

In July 2016, during Trump's presidential campaign, his opponent Hillary Clinton released a campaign video of one of the club's architects. The architect, Andrew Tesoro, described his dealings with the Trump Organization, where about a dozen employees met him at the finished clubhouse to negotiate reducing his fees. They pressured him into sending a reduced bill, of $50,000 instead of $140,000. After the organization failed to pay the bill, Tesoro met with Trump who convinced him to accept only $25,000 for his services. The Clinton campaign used the story as part of its effort to demonstrate that the Trump Organization harms small businesses. Later during Trump's campaign, in September 2016, The Washington Post reported that a six-foot (1.8 m) painting of Trump may be on display at the club. Trump had purchased Michael Israel's work for $200,000 in 2007 through his charity, the Donald J. Trump Foundation. According to IRS regulations, the painting would have to be used for a charitable purpose, or donated to a charity, however Melania Trump had planned to hang it in the club's boardroom or conference room, and the artist later stated he believed it was at the clubhouse. Although the painting was purchased at a charity auction, where half of the Trump Foundation's check went to the charity, in September 2016 an IRS director deemed Trump to have violated IRS rules and President Barack Obama publicly criticized Trump's purchase. The golf club was a topic of discussion in 2019, in a trial against the now-defunct Trump Foundation, where the president admitted the foundation had been used to settle legal obligations of the club.

== Current operations ==
In 2001, annual membership dues were stated to be $9,000 per member or $12,000 for a family, with an initial deposit of $250,000. Before the 2008 recession, initiation fees were $100,000 to $150,000. As of 2024, initiation fees were $75,000. Annual dues are $28,400 a year.

=== Property ===
The club is located on about 140 acres (60 ha) adjacent to Briarcliff Manor's central business district and in a residential area near Pace University's former Briarcliff campus off Pine Road. The property contains "The Residences at Trump National Golf Club", a series of sixteen attached townhouses ranging in size from 3,100–3,400 square feet (290–320 m^{2}) and which were designed by William Devereaux & Associates. Plans exist for an additional 71 condominiums; the site was approved for 87 home sites in 1987. The club also includes a member restaurant, which serves Kobe beef burgers, tuna flown in daily from Honolulu, and Trump Ice bottled water.

=== Tax assessments ===
Every year since 2015, the Trump Organization has challenged the local tax assessment which is based on the property's value. Local entity officials assessed it at $15 million, while the organization put it at $1.4 million. In a compromise agreement in July 2021, the assessed value was reduced by 30%. In October, the district attorney for Westchester County subpoenaed the property-tax records, indicating "signaling a previously unknown criminal inquiry into the Trump Organization".

== Notable members ==
In 2011, notable members included former Yankees manager Joe Torre, and actors Jack Nicholson and Clint Eastwood. Around 2003, members included Rudy Giuliani, Jack Nicholson, Hugh Grant, George Steinbrenner, and Regis Philbin. Visiting players include Ron Howard, Regis Philbin, and Bobby Bonilla, who came for the course's reopening in 2002, and professional golfer Nick Faldo. Other visitors include Michael Jordan, former New York City mayors Michael Bloomberg and Rudy Giuliani, and Billy Crystal, who joined Trump and members Bill Clinton and Joe Torre for the 2008 Joe Torre Safe at Home Foundation Golf Classic at the club.

Former US President Bill Clinton became a member of the club in May 2003. Donald Trump has said that he bought the club partly "because he knew Bill Clinton would need a place to play". Part of the Clintons' gift for Bill's 65th birthday was a round of golf at Trump National with Hillary and Chelsea Clinton.

The golf club is Eric Trump's home course. He raises about $3 million each year in an event there for St. Jude Children's Research Hospital. Mariano Rivera, the New York Knicks, and the Rangers also run charity tournaments there. At one time, Donald Trump had scheduled to be there himself at least once a week. Eric Trump and his foundation received scrutiny from the press in June 2017 after it was revealed that the foundation was funneling money to the Trump Organization through its charity tournaments, held at Trump National Golf Club Westchester and other sites. A few days later, New York Attorney General Eric Schneiderman was reported to be investigating Eric Trump's foundation and its events at the golf course.

== In popular culture ==
The club was shown on Trump's show The Apprentice, in season one's two-part finale for Bill Rancic's last challenge and season 10's two-part finale for Clint Robertson's.

== See also ==
- Donald Trump and golf
- History of Briarcliff Manor
- Legal affairs of Donald Trump

Preceded by Plainfield Country Club	Host of the Metropolitan Open; 1964	Succeeded by The Woodmere Club
