= Giuliana and Bill =

American reality television series

- Genre: Reality
- Starring: Giuliana Rancic; Bill Rancic
- Theme music composer: Savannah Packard
- Opening theme: "I Love Loving You"
- Country of origin: United States
- Original language: English
- No. of seasons: 7
- No. of episodes: 79

Production
- Executive producers: Robert Sizemore; Betsy Rott; Giuliana Rancic; Bill Rancic
- Running time: 42–44 minutes
- Production companies: Wilshire Studios; You & I Productions

Original release
- Network: Style Network (seasons 1–6); E! (season 7)
- Release: August 5, 2009 – June 3, 2014

Giuliana and Bill is an American reality television series that premiered on the Style Network on August 5, 2009. It features E! News host and Fashion Police host, Giuliana Rancic and her husband Bill Rancic, an American entrepreneur who won the first season of The Apprentice. The couple, who first met when Giuliana was interviewing Bill for E! News, were married on September 1, 2007. Giuliana and Bill moved to E!, from the now defunct Style Network, on October 15, 2013.

The response from E! to a question about the show's future as of late 2014 was, "The show is not on our current schedule."

== Episodes ==
=== Series overview ===
Season	Episodes	Originally released	
Season	Episodes	First released	Last released
1	10	August 5, 2009	October 7, 2009
2	8	January 3, 2010	March 14, 2010
3	10	October 11, 2010	December 20, 2010
4	10	July 18, 2011	September 26, 2011
5	21	April 3, 2012	December 11, 2012
6	10	July 16, 2013	September 17, 2013
7	10	April 1, 2014	June 3, 2014

=== Season 1 (2009) ===
No. overall	No. in season	Title	Original release date
1	1	"Home Sweet Home"	August 5, 2009
2	2	"Suburbs or the City"	August 12, 2009
3	3	"An Italian Homecoming"	August 19, 2009
4	4	"Jet Set Jitters"	August 26, 2009
5	5	"Giuliana's Night Out"	September 2, 2009
6	6	"California Dreamin'"	September 9, 2009
7	7	"Cooking Up Trouble"	September 16, 2009
8	8	"Surprise"	September 23, 2009
9	9	"The Detox Retreat"	September 30, 2009
10	10	"I Do, Take Two"	October 7, 2009

=== Season 2 (2010) ===
No. overall	No. in season	Title	Original release date
1	11	"Knocked Up?"	January 3, 2010
2	12	"Operation Ovulation"	January 10, 2010
3	13	"Family Matters"	January 17, 2010
4	14	"Child's Play"	January 24, 2010
5	15	"Couple's Retreat"	February 14, 2010
6	16	"Made in Hong Kong"	February 21, 2010
7	17	"Make Room for Giuliana"	February 28, 2010
8	18	"Maybe... Baby?"	March 14, 2010

=== Season 3 (2010) ===
No. overall	No. in season	Title	Original release date
1	19	"Baby Steps"	October 11, 2010
2	20	"Honey, Where's Home?"	October 18, 2010
3	21	"A Heartbreaking Loss"	October 25, 2010
4	22	"Picking up the Pieces"	November 1, 2010
5	23	"Roadtrip"	November 8, 2010
6	24	"Viva La Mancation"	November 22, 2010
7	25	"The Model Aunt"	November 29, 2010
8	26	"Mamma Mia!"	December 6, 2010
9	27	"Party Under Pressure"	December 13, 2010
10	28	"Last Chance"	December 20, 2010

=== Season 4 (2011) ===
No. overall	No. in season	Title	Original release date
1	29	"The Year of Fun"	July 18, 2011
2	30	"Rancics Go Royal"	July 25, 2011
3	31	"The DePandi Moving Company"	August 1, 2011
4	32	"Food Fight"	August 8, 2011
5	33	"Where to Next, Bill?"	August 15, 2011
6	34	"The Big 4-0"	August 22, 2011
7	35	"It's Bill's Party and He'll Cry If He Wants To"	August 29, 2011
8	36	"All in the Familia"	September 12, 2011
9	37	"It's Complicated"	September 19, 2011
10	38	"A New Addition to the Family"	September 26, 2011

=== Season 5 (2012) ===
No. overall	No. in season	Title	Original release date
1	39	"The Battle Begins"	April 3, 2012
2	40	"The Booby Traps"	April 10, 2012
3	41	"Baby Mama?"	April 17, 2012
4	42	"Surgery Day"	April 24, 2012
5	43	"Baby Dreams"	May 1, 2012
6	44	"Back With a Bounce"	May 8, 2012
7	45	"New House Hunters"	May 15, 2012
8	46	"48 Hour Hustle"	May 22, 2012
9	47	"Mama DePandi's Big Night"	May 29, 2012
10	48	"What Happens in Cabo..."	June 5, 2012
11	49	"Boy or Girl?"	October 2, 2012
12	50	"The Countdown Begins"	October 9, 2012
13	51	"We're Having a..."	October 16, 2012
14	52	"Babies Hate Me!"	October 23, 2012
15	53	"How to Be a Sexy Mom"	October 30, 2012
16	54	"Who's Your Nanny?"	November 13, 2012
17	54	"She's Having a Baby"	November 13, 2012
18	54	"Meet the Duke!"	November 20, 2012
19	55	"Duke of Hazzard"	November 27, 2012
20	56	"Daddy Duty"	December 4, 2012
21	57	"Holy Baby!"	December 11, 2012

=== Season 6 (2013) ===
No. overall	No. in season	Title	Original release date
1	58	"Baby Hogs"	July 16, 2013
2	59	"Duke's Nanny & Pedi"	July 23, 2013
3	60	"G-String Surprise"	July 30, 2013
4	61	"Duking It Out"	August 6, 2013
5	62	"Baby on the Loose"	August 13, 2013
6	63	"Is Nonna Getting Botox?"	August 20, 2013
7	64	"G's First Mother's Day"	August 27, 2013
8	65	"One Tough Tot"	September 3, 2013
9	66	"Rancic Family Vacation"	September 10, 2013
10	67	"Time for Baby No. 2"	September 17, 2013

=== Season 7 (2014) ===
No. overall	No. in season	Title	Original release date
1	68	"Home Alone"	April 1, 2014
2	69	"Day of the Dukes"	April 8, 2014
3	70	"Fifty Shades of G&B"	April 15, 2014
4	71	"Up in the Air"	April 22, 2014
5	72	"The Italian Job"	April 29, 2014
6	73	"Rancic & Relaxation"	May 6, 2014
7	74	"Saving Face"	May 13, 2014
8	75	"Marathon Not a Sprint"	May 20, 2014
9	76	"Couples' Retreat"	May 27, 2014
10	77	"A Sibling for Duke?"	June 3, 2014

== Ratings ==
The third season of Giuliana & Bill was rated .53, marking the season's highest rated rating for this series. It was also most watched with 357,000 total viewers. The season finale on December 20, 2010 tallied the series best rating of a .87 for women between the ages 18–49 and over 600,000 total viewers. The fourth season of Giuliana and Bill attained its most watched season yet with +23% viewers and +11% in women between the ages 18–49 over its previous season. The fifth-season premiere was the most-watched of the series with 528,000 viewers—with 283,000 among women ages 18–49 and 155,000 among those ages 18–34. The season six premiere acquired 600,000 total viewers, which is plus 13% versus last season's premiere. The episode that aired on August 27, 2013, squired 632,000 total viewers, which is +5% over the season's record breaking premiere. Additionally, this marked the Style Network's most-watched telecast to date for 2013.
