= 1942 PGA Championship =

Coordinates: 39.449°N 74.474°W

Tournament information
- Dates: May 25–31, 1942
- Location: Galloway Twp., New Jersey
- Course: Seaview Country Club
- Organized by: PGA of America
- Tour: PGA Tour
- Format: Match play - 5 rounds

Statistics
- Par: 72
- Length: 6,750 yards (6,172 m)
- Field: 102 players, 32 to match play
- Cut: 147 (+3), playoff
- Prize fund: $7,550
- Winner's share: $2,000

Champion
- (United States) Sam Snead
- def. Jim Turnesa, 2 and 1

Location in the United States
Location in New Jersey

The 1942 PGA Championship was the 25th PGA Championship, held May 25–31 at Seaview Country Club in Galloway Township, New Jersey, just north of Atlantic City, United States. Then a match play championship, Sam Snead won 2 and 1 in the final over Jim Turnesa.

It was the first of Snead's seven major titles, and he began his service in the U.S. Navy immediately after the event. Turnesa, from a large family of professional golfers, won the PGA Championship in 1952. He was serving in the U.S. Army and had defeated the other pre-tournament favorites, Ben Hogan and Byron Nelson, in the quarterfinals and semifinals.

Due to World War II, this was the second and final major of the year, following the Masters. None of the majors were played in 1943; the PGA Championship returned in 1944 and the other three in 1946. The field for this PGA Championship was reduced from prior years, with 32 advancing to match play, and all five rounds at 36 holes per match. This format was continued for 1944 and 1945, then returned to the pre-war match play field of 64 in 1946.

In the three previous years, Nelson had advanced to the finals, but was defeated in the 1942 semifinals by Turnesa in 37 holes. Nelson returned to the finals at the next two editions for five finals in six PGA Championships; he won two, in 1940 and 1945. Prior to his match with Nelson, Turnesa defeated Hogan 2 and 1 in the quarterfinals; after the war, Hogan won the title in 1946 and 1948.

Defending champion Vic Ghezzi, a New Jersey native, lost 4 and 3 in the first round to Jimmy Demaret, who fell 3 & 2 to Snead in the semifinals. Harry Cooper was the medalist in the stroke play qualifier at 138 (−6), but lost to Nelson in the quarterfinals on the third extra hole.

The golf course, now known as the Bay Course of the Stockton Seaview Hotel and Golf Club, was designed in 1914 by Donald Ross. It hosts an annual event on the LPGA Tour, the ShopRite LPGA Classic.

== Format ==
The match play format at the PGA Championship in 1942 called for 12 rounds (216 holes) in seven days:

- Monday and Tuesday – 36-hole stroke play qualifier, 18 holes per day, field of 102 players;
  - the top 31 professionals advanced to match play, joining defending champion Vic Ghezzi
- Wednesday – first round – 36 holes
- Thursday – second round – 36 holes
- Friday – quarterfinals – 36 holes
- Saturday – semifinals – 36 holes
- Sunday – final – 36 holes

== Final results ==
Sunday, May 31, 1942

Place	Player	Money ($)
1	(United States) Sam Snead	2,000
2	(United States) Jim Turnesa	750
T3	(United States) Jimmy Demaret	450
T3	(United States) Byron Nelson	450
T5	(United States) Harry Cooper	300
T5	(United States) Ed Dudley	300
T5	(United States) Ben Hogan	300
T5	(United States) Craig Wood	300

== Final eight bracket ==
Quarter-finals; May 29
Sam Snead	1up
Ed Dudley
Jimmy Demaret	7&6
Craig Wood
Jim Turnesa	2&1
Ben Hogan
Byron Nelson	39h
Harry Cooper

Semi-finals; May 30
Sam Snead	3&2
Jimmy Demaret
Jim Turnesa	37h
Byron Nelson

Finals; May 31
Sam Snead	2&1
Jim Turnesa

== Final match scorecards ==
Morning

Hole	1	2	3	4	5	6	7	8	9	10	11	12	13	14	15	16	17	18
Par	4	4	4	4	4	4	3	4	5	4	5	3	4	4	4	5	3	4
(United States) Snead	4	4	4	3	4	4	3	4	5	5	4	4	4	4	4	5	3	5
(United States) Turnesa	4	3	5	4	3	4	3	3	5	4	5	3	3	4	5	4	3	5
Leader	–	T1	–	S1	–	–	–	T1	T1	T2	T1	T2	T3	T3	T2	T3	T3	T3

Afternoon

Hole	1	2	3	4	5	6	7	8	9	10	11	12	13	14	15	16	17	18
Par	4	4	4	4	4	4	3	4	5	4	5	3	4	4	4	5	3	4
(United States) Snead	4	6	4	4	4	4	3	3	4	4	4	3	4	4	4	4	2	
(United States) Turnesa	5	4	4	4	4	5	3	4	5	5	4	4	4	4	4	4	2	
Leader	T2	T3	T3	T3	T3	T2	T2	T1	–	S1	S1	S2	S2	S2	S2	S2	S2	

Birdie	Bogey	Double bogey
