= 1996 PGA Championship =

Coordinates: 38.242°N 85.472°W

Tournament information
- Dates: August 8–11, 1996
- Location: Louisville, Kentucky, U.S.
- Course: Valhalla Golf Club
- Organized by: PGA of America
- Tour(s): PGA Tour; European Tour

Statistics
- Par: 72
- Length: 7,144 yards (6,532 m)
- Field: 150 players, 81 after cut
- Cut: 145 (+1)
- Prize fund: $2.4 million
- Winner's share: $430,000

Champion
- (United States) Mark Brooks
- 277 (−11), playoff

Location in the United States

The 1996 PGA Championship was the 78th PGA Championship, held August 8–11 at Valhalla Golf Club in Louisville, Kentucky. Mark Brooks won his only major championship with a birdie at the first hole of a sudden-death playoff with Kentucky native Kenny Perry. Defending champion Steve Elkington was a stroke out of the playoff, in a tie for third. It was the second consecutive and final sudden-death playoff at the PGA Championship, which changed to a three-hole aggregate format, first used in 2000 at Valhalla.

It was the second major played in Kentucky and the first in 44 years; the PGA Championship, a match play event through 1957, was played in Louisville in 1952 at Big Spring Country Club. The championship returned to Valhalla just four years later in 2000, and again in 2014 and 2024, and after hosting the Ryder Cup in 2008.

Course designer and five-time champion Jack Nicklaus missed the cut by a single stroke at age 56. He also missed the cut by one stroke in 2000 at age 60, his final appearance in the PGA Championship.

== Course layout ==
Hole	1	2	3	4	5	6	7	8	9	Out	10	11	12	13	14	15	16	17	18	In	Total
Yards	425	515	199	355	460	415	605	165	415	3,554	565	165	470	350	208	410	450	432	540	3,590	7,144
Par	4	5	3	4	4	4	5	3	4	36	5	3	4	4	3	4	4	4	5	36	72

== Round summaries ==
=== First round ===
Thursday, August 8, 1996
Friday, August 9, 1996

Kenny Perry shot a first round 66 (−6) to take the lead, finishing in the dark. Weather delayed play for nearly four hours and sixty players completed their first rounds on Friday morning.

Place	Player	Score	To par
1	(United States) Kenny Perry	66	−6
T2	(Australia) Steve Elkington	67	−5
T2	(United States) Phil Mickelson	67	−5
T4	(United States) Mark Brooks	68	−4
T4	(United States) Russ Cochran	68	−4
T4	(United States) Joel Edwards	68	−4
T4	(United States) Lee Janzen	68	−4
T4	(Australia) Greg Norman	68	−4
T4	(Zimbabwe) Nick Price	68	−4
T4	(Wales) Ian Woosnam	68	−4

=== Second round ===
Friday, August 9, 1996

Phil Mickelson, age 26, played 24 holes on Friday and carded consecutive rounds of 67 to take a three stroke lead at 134 (−10).

Place	Player	Score	To par
1	(United States) Phil Mickelson	67-67=134	−10
2	(United States) Justin Leonard	71-66=137	−7
T3	(United States) Mark Brooks	68-70=138	−6
T3	(United States) Kenny Perry	66-72=138	−6
T3	(Fiji) Vijay Singh	69-69=138	−6
T6	(United States) Lee Janzen	68-71=139	−5
T6	(Zimbabwe) Nick Price	68-71=139	−5
T8	(United States) Mike Brisky	71-69=140	−4
T8	(United States) Russ Cochran	68-72=140	−4
T8	(United States) David Edwards	69-71=140	−4
T8	(United States) Brad Faxon	72-68=140	−4
T8	(United States) Jim Furyk	70-70=140	−4
T8	(Australia) Greg Norman	68-72=140	−4
T8	(Sweden) Jesper Parnevik	73-67=140	−4
T8	(United States) Tommy Tolles	69-71=140	−4
T8	(United States) Tom Watson	69-71=140	−4
T8	(Wales) Ian Woosnam	68-72=140	−4

=== Third round ===
Saturday, August 10, 1996

Kentucky native Russ Cochran shot a course record 65 (−7) to take the 54-hole lead, two strokes ahead of Mark Brooks and Vijay Singh. Brooks eagled the par-4 15th, holing out from the fairway. Seeking his first major title, Mickelson fell three strokes back after a 74 (+2).

Place	Player	Score	To par
1	(United States) Russ Cochran	68-72-65=205	−11
T2	(United States) Mark Brooks	68-70-69=207	−9
T2	(Fiji) Vijay Singh	69-69-69=207	−9
T4	(Australia) Steve Elkington	67-74-67=208	−8
T4	(United States) Phil Mickelson	67-67-74=208	−8
T4	(Zimbabwe) Nick Price	68-71-69=208	−8
T7	(United States) Mike Brisky	71-69-69=209	−7
T7	(United States) Justin Leonard	71-66-72=209	−7
T7	(Australia) Greg Norman	68-72-69=209	−7
T7	(Sweden) Jesper Parnevik	73-67-69=209	−7
T7	(United States) Kenny Perry	66-72-71=209	−7

=== Final round ===
Sunday, August 11, 1996

Native sons of Kentucky had different results on Sunday as Cochran shot 77 (+5) in the final pairing and faded while Perry had a 68 (−4) and waited as the clubhouse leader at 277 (−11). Playing with Cochran, Brooks birdied the par-5 final hole to force a playoff. Perry bogeyed the same hole after a hooked tee shot and was in the television booth with CBS-TV, not hitting balls. The second shot of defending champion Steve Elkington found a greenside bunker; he had a 10-foot (3 m) birdie putt to join the playoff, but could not convert. Tolles had a long eagle putt to tie but missed, while Singh also needed a birdie to join the playoff but made bogey to finish 2 behind.

Place	Player	Score	To par	Money ($)
T1	(United States) Mark Brooks	68-70-69-70=277	−11	Playoff
T1	(United States) Kenny Perry	66-72-71-68=277	−11	Playoff
T3	(Australia) Steve Elkington	67-74-67-70=278	−10	140,000
T3	(United States) Tommy Tolles	69-71-71-67=278	−10	140,000
T5	(United States) Justin Leonard	71-66-72-70=279	−9	86,667
T5	(Sweden) Jesper Parnevik	73-67-69-70=279	−9	86,667
T5	(Fiji) Vijay Singh	69-69-69-72=279	−9	86,667
T8	(United States) Lee Janzen	68-71-71-70=280	−8	57,500
T8	(Sweden) Per-Ulrik Johansson	73-72-66-69=280	−8	57,500
T8	(United States) Phil Mickelson	67-67-74-72=280	−8	57,500
T8	(United States) Larry Mize	71-70-69-70=280	−8	57,500
T8	(New Zealand) Frank Nobilo	69-72-71-68=280	−8	57,500
T8	(Zimbabwe) Nick Price	68-71-69-72=280	−8	57,500

==== Scorecard ====
Birdie	Bogey

Final round

Hole	1	2	3	4	5	6	7	8	9	10	11	12	13	14	15	16	17	18
Par	4	5	3	4	4	4	5	3	4	5	3	4	4	3	4	4	4	5
(United States) Brooks	−9	−10	−9	−9	−9	−10	−11	−12	−12	−12	−11	−10	−10	−9	−10	−10	−10	−11
(United States) Perry	−7	−7	−7	−7	−7	−7	−7	−8	−9	−9	−10	−10	−11	−12	−12	−12	−12	−11

==== Playoff ====
The sudden-death playoff began on the 540-yard (494 m) 18th hole; the par-5 was the course's second-easiest hole on Sunday. Brooks reached the green in two and birdied while Perry's tee shot again found the rough on the left and his fourth was a chip that did not reach the green, ending the playoff. It was Brooks' second birdie at the hole in twenty minutes; in regulation he hit his third shot from the greenside sand to within four feet (1.3 m).

Place	Player	Score	To par	Money ($)
1	(United States) Mark Brooks	4	−1	430,000
2	(United States) Kenny Perry	x	−	260,000
