= Seaview (Galloway, New Jersey) =

Golf club in Galloway Township, New Jersey, US

Seaview Golf Resort

- Location within the United States Location within New Jersey
- 39.449°N 74.474°W

Club information
- Location: Galloway, New Jersey
- Elevation: 40 feet (12 m)
- Established: 1914; 112 years ago
- Type: Public
- Operator: Dolce Hotels and Resorts
- Tota holes: 36
- Tournaments: 1942 PGA Championship; ShopRite LPGA Classic
- Website: Seaview Golf; Seaview Resort

Bay Course
- Designed by: Hugh Wilson (1914), Donald Ross (1915), Bob Cupp Jr. (1998)
- Par: 71
- Length: 6,155 yards (5,628 m)
- Course rating: 69.5
- Slope rating: 120

Pines Course
- Designed by: William S. Flynn and Howard C. Toomey (1929), William Gordon (1957), Al Janis (1990)
- Par: 71
- Length: 6,731 yards (6,155 m)
- Course rating: 72.1
- Slope rating: 126

The Seaview is a golf club and resort on the East Coast of the United States, located in Galloway Township, New Jersey, north of nearby Atlantic City. The club hosted the ShopRite LPGA Classic in 1986-87, from 1998-2006 and again starting in 2010. During World War II, it hosted the PGA Championship in 1942, Sam Snead's first major title. The course also cooperates with Rutgers University on testing of new turf breeds and natural control of mosquitoes.

The resort has two golf courses, Bay and Pines, and a 300-room hotel with tennis courts, swimming pools, two mini basketball courts, jogging trails, a fitness center, and a spa.

On September 1, 2010, The Richard Stockton College of New Jersey took ownership of the hotel and the Bay course.

On August 1, 2018, it was announced that The Richard Stockton College of New Jersey sold the club to Florida-based KDG Capital LLC for $21 million.

== History ==
The golf club dates from 1914, when public utility magnate Clarence H. Geist founded the Seaview Country Club. The original golf course, known today as the Bay Course, was partially designed by Hugh Wilson (who also designed the two courses at Merion Golf Club). In 1915, Donald Ross completed the course by adding the sand bunkers. In 1998, the course was restored by Bob Cupp Jr. to be close to the original design. Today the course plays as a par 71, 6,155 yards (5,628 m), or 6,247 yards (5,712 m) from the back tees. In 2006, the hole numbers were rearranged to improve logistics.

In 1929, the club opened a nine-hole course designed by William S. Flynn and Howard C. Toomey. A second nine holes were built by Flynn disciple William Gordon in 1957, and the rearranged layout became known as the Pines Course. Three holes were removed in 1990 to make room for a practice facility, with replacements designed by Al Janis. Today, the course is 6,731 yards (6,155 m) from the back tees and is also a par 71.

Seaview logo under LaSalle Hotel Property ownership

In 1984, the Marriott Corporation bought the club, and turned it into a resort open to the public. Marriott sold the property to LaSalle Hotel Properties in 1998, but continued to manage it until 2009. Marriott Vacation Club owns the adjacent Fairway Villas vacation condominium complex and the Pines course, but both courses and recreational facilities are seamlessly open to guests from the hotel and the vacation club. Dolce Hotels and Resorts took over management of the hotel and Troon Golf was retained to manage the golf courses.

In 2009, Seaview was honored by Golfweek magazine as one of the “Best Courses You Can Play” in New Jersey, and by Golf World magazine with a 2009 Readers' Choice Award.

In July 2010, it was reported that the Richard Stockton College of New Jersey was negotiating with LaSalle Hotel Properties regarding the possible purchase of the hotel. On September 1, 2010, Stockton College finalized the deal for 20 million.

=== Tournaments ===
The Seaview Country Club hosted the 1942 PGA Championship, then a match play event. Sam Snead won the final match at 2 & 1 over Jim Turnesa to claim the first of his seven major championships. He closed out the match by holing a 60-foot (18 m) chip shot for birdie on the 35th hole. A composite course was used for the event, using the front nine of the Bay Course coupled with the nine holes designed by Flynn.

In 1986, the Bay Course hosted the inaugural Atlantic City Classic, an LPGA Tour event, and did so again the following year. The tournament, by then named the ShopRite LPGA Classic, returned in 1998 and remained at the club through 2006, and was revived as an annual event in 2010.

== Scorecard ==
Seaview Resort & Spa - Bay Course
Tee	Rating/Slope	1	2	3	4	5	6	7	8	9	Out	10	11	12	13	14	15	16	17	18	In	Total
Blue	69.5/120	357	434	484	360	301	393	190	319	476	3314	352	230	320	415	419	204	377	115	501	2933	6247
White	68.4/117	345	421	464	347	291	380	180	302	463	3193	337	221	311	401	403	193	366	104	482	2818	6011
Gold	70.4/124	293	341	394	290	255	319	110	288	411	2701	272	179	275	325	321	150	294	92	408	2316	5017
Par		4	4	5	4	4	4	3	4	5	37	4	3	4	4	4	3	4	3	5	34	71
SI		9	1	7	11	15	3	17	13	5		10	14	12	6	2	16	8	18	4
