= We Mean Business =

We Mean Business may refer to:

- We Mean Business (TV series), an American reality television series
- We Mean Business (album), a 2008 album by EPMD
