= Santa Maria di Costantinopoli, Anacapri =

Church in Anacapri, Italy

Coordinates: 40°33′10.85″N 14°13′12.7″E

Chiesa di Santa Maria di Costantinopoli is a church located in the Li Curti district of Anacapri, on the island of Capri, Italy. Built in the eleventh century and restored in the seventeenth century, its architectural features include Gothic and Byzantine elements. It contains several works by the Flemish painter Willem Borremans. At one time the parish church of Anacapri, the Chiesa di Santa Maria di Costantinopoli was replaced by the Chiesa di Santa Sofia in that role.
