= Santa Sofia, Capri =

Roman Catholic church in Anacapri, Italy

Coordinates: 40°33′15.07″N 14°13′1.36″E

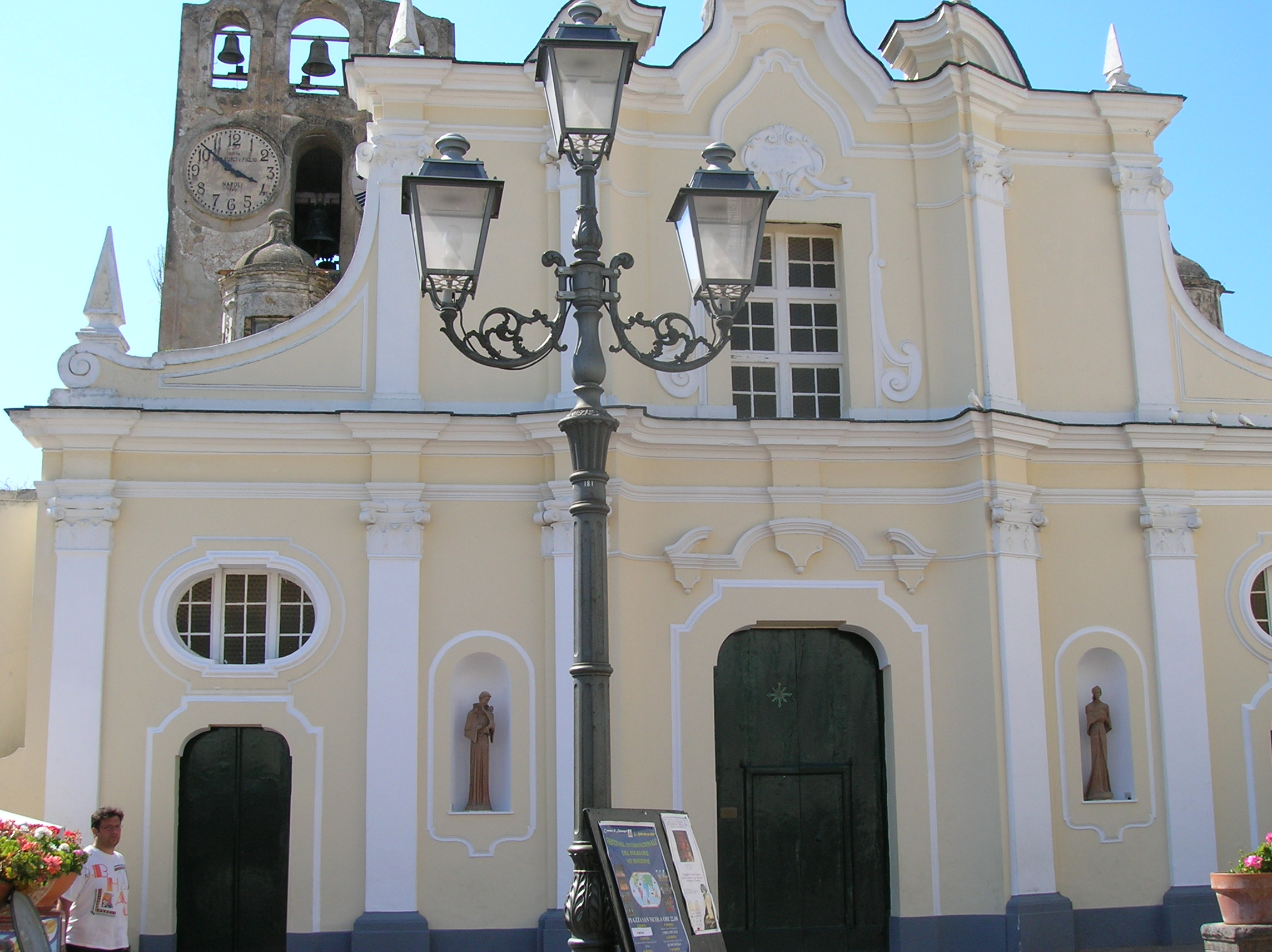
Chiesa di Santa Sofia

Santa Sofia is a Catholic church in the piazza of Anacapri, on the island of Capri, Italy. It dates to 1596, when it replaced Chiesa di Santa Maria di Costantinopoli as the local parish church. Some of the building materials and fittings, such as the sacristy and oratorio, were originally in the Chiesa di San Carlo. The church chapels are dedicated to Sant'Antonio, Anacapri's patron saint, and the Madonna del Buon Consiglio. Architectural features include two bell towers and a baroque facade.

== History ==
Santa Sophia probably dates back to 1595–96 on a site where there was an earlier church dedicated to St Charles. The date of 1510 inscribed on the facade is incorrect. Completed in 1642, it became the new parish church of Anacapri replacing Santa Maria di Costantinopoli. The oldest remaining part is the oratory, to the left of the chancel, which was probably built on the remains of San Carlo. In 1698, the church was enlarged with two chapels and the nave was extended towards the square. Further alterations were made in 1706 (Mount of Purgatory), 1765 (facade] and 1777 [belfry]. The church was officially consecrated in 1790 by Nicola Saveirio Gamboni, bishop of Capri. In 1879, the presbytery was enlarged, providing space for guests. The wedding of Guiliana DePandi and Bill Rancic occurred at the church in 2007.

== Architecture ==
The plan of the church is in the form of a Latin cross with a single nave, lateral chapels and a dome above the intersection of the nave and the transept. The absence of detailed planning from the start can be seen in the way chapels of various sizes have been developed without any consistency. The nave is covered by a large vault while the chapels have vaults of various sizes. The square-shaped apse houses an eighteenth-century marble altar. The dome is supported by four large arches with pilasters extending upwards and dividing the dome into eight segments. It was destroyed by lightning in 2004 but has since been repaired. In addition to the main dome, there are five smaller domes, each topped by a lantern.

The facade consists of two overlapping sections, connected by volutes which terminate in low pinnacles. The main lesene's enclose three sections interspersed with two smaller ones where two niches house clay statues of Sant'Antonio and Santa Sofia, both the work of the Roman sculptor Neni or Nene. The central section contains the main door with a decorated stucco frame while the upper level houses a rectangular window. There are also smaller doors on either side of the main door, each surmounted by an oval window. The belfry can be seen to the left of the facade with two clocks and three bells dedicated to Santa Sofia, Santa Maroa and Santa Elia.

In the nave immediately before the last arch on the right there is a raised pulpit standing on two corbels. It consists of a rectangular enclosure decorated with polychrome marble. The sacristy and the oratory are to the left of the presbytery. Built on the foundations of the old San Carlo church, the oratory is a rectangular room with a cloister vault containing a series of triangular lunettes.
