= Giuliana Rancic =

Italian-American journalist, television personality and infotainer

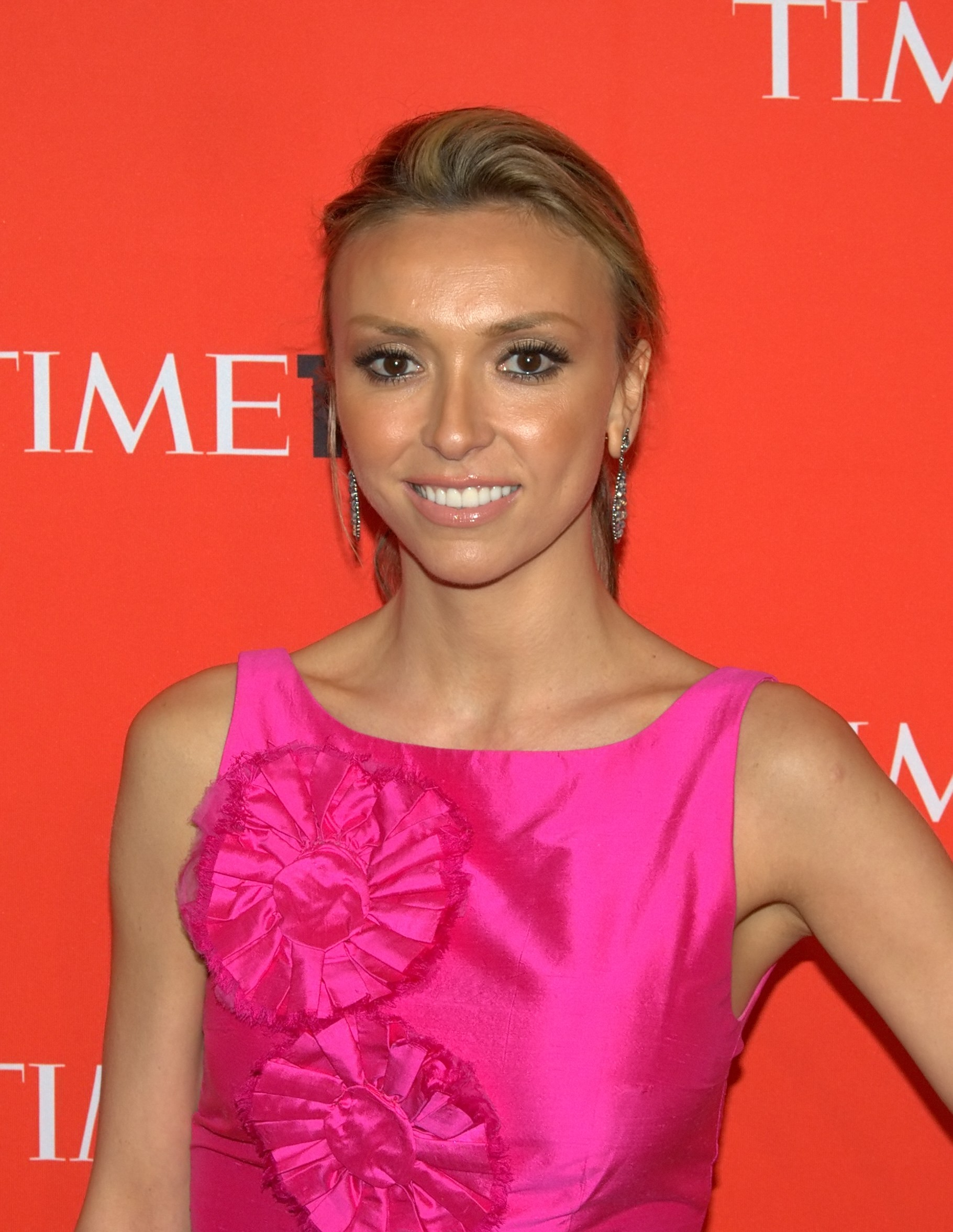
- Rancic at the Time 100 Gala in 2010
- Born: Giuliana DePandi; August 17, 1974 (age 52); Naples, Italy
- Education: University of Maryland, College Park (BA); American University (MA)
- Occupations: Entertainment reporter; television personality; fashion designer; entrepreneur
- Years active: 1998–present
- Television: E! News; Giuliana and Bill; Fashion Police
- Spouse: Bill Rancic (m. 2007)
- Children: 1
- Website: Official website

Giuliana Rancic (/ˈrænsɪk/; née DePandi; born August 17, 1974) is an American entertainment reporter and television personality. She is a former co-anchor of E! News and resides in Chicago and Los Angeles.

== Early life ==
Rancic was born in Naples, Italy and immigrated to the United States with her family at age seven. Her father was a tailor who owned a store in White Flint Mall, and they lived nearby in Bethesda, Maryland; Rancic went to Walt Whitman High School, where she was a cheerleader.

She had surgery to correct her scoliosis when she was 21. She received a bachelor's degree in journalism from the University of Maryland, College Park, and a master's degree in journalism from American University. During this time, she worked for a Capitol Hill news bureau covering stories related to the U.S. government. Rancic also graduated from Barbizon Modeling and Acting School.

== Entertainment career ==
Rancic joined E! network's E! News as a reporter in 2002 and became an anchor in 2005. Over the years, she has shared co-hosting responsibilities with Ryan Seacrest, Terrence J, and Jason Kennedy.

Additionally, she co-hosted E!'s Fashion Police and often co-hosts red carpet events for award shows, such as the Golden Globes and the Academy Awards. She is the creator and executive producer of MTV's Celebrity Rap Superstar, which premiered in 2007. She and her husband, Bill Rancic, star in the reality-television show Giuliana and Bill which aired on E!. She appeared in the movie Bring It On: Fight to the Finish in a brief scene. Rancic also has hosted the Miss USA and Miss Universe beauty pageants on NBC.

Rancic won the 2014 Daytime Emmy Award for Fan Favorite.

In February 2015, Rancic faced backlash over her controversial comments about synthetic dreadlocks worn by Zendaya at the Oscars, remarking that the actress looked like she smelled of "patchouli oil and weed".

On July 10, 2015, Rancic announced that after nearly a decade, she would be leaving her position as co-anchor on E! News, yet would continue to be the host of Fashion Police. On September 4, 2018, the personality returned to the role of anchor.

In May 2021, Rancic announced that after 20 years, she would be leaving her position as co-host of Live from the Red Carpet. In the same month, E! announced that Laverne Cox would take over for Rancic as host of Live from the Red Carpet.

== Other ventures ==
In August 2011, Rancic and her husband announced plans to open a restaurant in partnership with Lettuce Entertain You Enterprises. The restaurant was named RPM Italian, with a menu including dishes inspired by Rancic's mother, "Mama DePandi", and it opened in the River North district of Chicago in February 2012. The partnership opened several more restaurants, including RPM Steak in Chicago, another RPM Italian in Washington, D.C., and a planned RPM On the Water opening in 2019 in Chicago. The restaurants have been popular with celebrities, including President Barack Obama and First Lady Michelle Obama.

In 2013, Giuliana launched her clothing line, G by Giuliana, on HSN. She also launched a wine line, Xo, G.

In 2013, Rancic, who has a history of breast cancer, founded Fab-U-Wish, a charity that grants wishes to women undergoing breast cancer treatment.

== Personal life ==
In the 2003 and 2004, Giuliana dated actor Jerry O'Connell. He later admitted he broke up with her via his apartment's intercom system when she showed up unannounced while he had another woman in his apartment.

On December 15, 2006, Giuliana and Bill Rancic announced their engagement. They were married on September 1, 2007, in a ceremony at Santa Sofia Church in Anacapri, Italy. The family owns homes in Chicago, Illinois, and Brentwood, California, and a vacation home on Lake Coeur d'Alene, Idaho.

The two have publicly discussed their fertility issues on television talk shows, having tried to conceive since approximately the beginning of 2009. The couple began in vitro fertilization (IVF) in March 2010, and Rancic got pregnant in the spring of 2010, but she miscarried at nine weeks. She had an IVF transfer for a second time in November 2010; however, the procedure did not result in a pregnancy. When the couple decided to try for a third round of IVF, her doctor recommended a mammogram, which is how she found out she had breast cancer. Despite her condition, the couple were still motivated to have a baby, so they continued with the egg retrieval and found a surrogate.

On October 17, 2011, during an interview on Today, Rancic announced she had been diagnosed with early stage breast cancer, for which she would be treated with a double lumpectomy, followed by radiation treatment. She underwent surgery in mid-October 2011 and returned to work at E! News about a week later. On December 5, 2011, Rancic disclosed she had decided to undergo a bilateral mastectomy.

On April 23, 2012, Giuliana and Bill announced on The Today Show that they were expecting their first child via a gestational surrogate. Their son was born in late August 2012.

== Filmography ==
| Year | Title | Role | Notes |
|---|---|---|---|
| 2003 | Malibu's Most Wanted | Massage girls | Credited as Giuliana DePandi |
| 2004 | One on One | Reporter Tammy Towne | Season 4 Episode 5 |
| 2005–2015, 2018–2019 | E! News | Co-host / Herself | Co-host since March 13, 2006 |
| 2007 | Fantastic Four: Rise of the Silver Surfer | Herself | Cameo |
| 2009 | Bring It On: Fight to the Finish | Herself | Cameo |
| 2009 | Are You Smarter Than a 5th Grader? | Herself | Played for charity on October 13, 2009; footage of her appearance was also shown on Giuliana and Bill |
| 2010–2014 | Giuliana and Bill | Herself | Reality show with her husband, Bill Rancic, on E!; originally on "The Style Network" for seasons (1–6) |
| 2010–2017 | Fashion Police | Co-host / Herself | Alongside Kelly Osbourne, Joan Rivers, and George Kotsiopoulos; Co-host since September 10, 2010 |
| 2011 | After Lately | Herself | Guest Starred in the episode "Whose Vagina is it, Anyway?!" |
| 2011 | Miss USA 2011 | Co-host / Herself | Alongside Kelly Osbourne, Andy Cohen, Susie Castillo |
| 2011 | Chelsea Lately | Herself | Guest Starred in the interview segment alongside her husband, Bill Rancic |
| 2012 | E! True Hollywood Story | Herself | Biography of her life |
| 2012 | Miss USA 2012 | Co-host / Herself | Alongside Kelly Osbourne, Andy Cohen, Jeannie Mai |
| 2012 | Miss Universe 2012 | Co-host / Herself | Alongside Andy Cohen |
| 2013 | Ready for Love | Co-host / Herself | Alongside husband Bill Rancic |
| 2013 | Miss USA 2013 | Co-host / Herself | Alongside Nick Jonas |
| 2014 | Miss USA 2014 | Co-host / Herself | Alongside Thomas Roberts |
| 2020 | The Stand In | Herself | |

== Awards ==
Rancic was ranked #93 on the Maxim Hot 100 Women of 2004. She was also featured in People magazine's 100 Most Beautiful of 2006 issue. Giuliana was nominated Favorite TV Celebreality Star for the 2012 People's Choice Awards. In June 2014, Rancic was named "Fan Favorite" during the Daytime Emmy Awards. She dedicated the award to her six million followers on social media.

== Books ==
- DePandi, Giuliana (2006). Think Like a Guy: How to Get a Guy by Thinking Like One. St. Martin's Griffin. ISBN 978-0312354374.
- Rancic, Giuliana; Rancic, Bill (2010). I Do, Now What?: Secrets, Stories, and Advice from a Madly-in-Love Couple. Ballantine Books. ISBN 978-0345524997.
- Rancic, Giuliana (2015). Going Off Script. Crown Group. ISBN 9780553446654.
