= ShopRite LPGA Classic =

Coordinates: 39.448°N 74.473°W

Tournament information
- Location: Galloway, New Jersey, U.S.
- Established: 1986
- Courses: Seaview, Bay Course
- Par: 71
- Length: 6,190 yards (5,660 m)
- Tour: LPGA Tour
- Format: 54 holes Stroke play (72 holes in 1990 & 2020)
- Prize fund: $1.75 million
- Month played: June

Tournament record score
- Aggregate: 196 Sörenstam (1998, 2005); 196 Nordqvist (2016); 265 Mel Reid (2020)
- To par: −17 Sörenstam (1998, 2005) −17 Nordqvist (2016) −19 Mel Reid (2020)

Current champion
- (France) Céline Boutier

Location in the United States
Location in
New Jersey

The ShopRite LPGA Classic, known in full for sponsorship reasons as The ShopRite LPGA Classic Powered by Wakefern, is a women's professional golf tournament on the LPGA Tour in Galloway, New Jersey, near Atlantic City. It took place annually from 1986 through 2006 and returned to the tour schedule in 2010 at the Bay Course at the Dolce Seaview Resort, with a prize fund of $1.75 million. Purchased in September 2010, the resort is now known as Seaview, A Dolce Hotel.

== History ==
From 1986 through 2006, the tournament was played at two different courses near Atlantic City, with the first two and last nine years played on the Bay Course of the Seaview Marriott Resort. It was a 54-hole tournament played over three days, except for 1990 when it was a four-day, 72-hole event. For a decade (1988–97), the event was played at Greate Bay Country Club in Somers Point, known as Sands Country Club until 1991.

The tournament was originally known as the Atlantic City LPGA Classic. Its name was changed in 1992 to the ShopRite LPGA Classic when Wakefern Food Corporation took over as the sponsor.

In 2013, Acer, a Taiwanese computer hardware and electronics company, was added as a presenting sponsor.

Starting in the 2007 season, the LPGA decided to use the traditional ShopRite Classic dates in early June for a new tournament, the Ginn Tribute Hosted by Annika. After being unable to agree with the LPGA on new dates, the owners decided to end the tournament. ShopRite retained a presence on the LPGA Tour in 2007 as the presenting sponsor of the Sybase Classic. Under the leadership of Eiger Marketing Group in 2009, the LPGA Tour announced that the ShopRite LPGA Classic would return to the schedule in 2010, as a three-day tournament to be played at the same course. The resort on which the course sits was renamed the Dolce Seaview Resort in 2009 after Dolce Hotels took over management from Marriott. Following the purchase by the Richard Stockton College of New Jersey for $20 million in September 2010, it was renamed the Stockton Seaview Hotel and Golf Club. The name of property was changed to Seaview, A Dolce Hotel, when it was purchased by KDG Capital LLC in July 2018.

Multiple winners of the event are Betsy King (1987, 1995, 2001), Annika Sörenstam (1998, 2002, 2005), Juli Inkster (1986, 1988), Stacy Lewis (2012, 2014) and Anna Nordqvist (2015, 2016). There have been two playoffs, in 1988 and 1992.

== Tournament names ==
- 1986–1987: Atlantic City LPGA Classic
- 1988–1991: Atlantic City Classic
- 1992–2012: ShopRite LPGA Classic (not held 2007–09)
- 2013–2025: ShopRite LPGA Classic Presented by Acer
- 2026–present: ShopRite LPGA Classic Powered by Wakefern

== Course ==
Bay Course

Hole	1	2	3	4	5	6	7	8	9	Out	10	11	12	13	14	15	16	17	18	In	Total
Yards	345	420	484	360	301	393	185	319	476	3,283	352	179	320	405	419	204	377	115	501	2,872	6,155
Par	4	4	5	4	4	4	3	4	5	37	4	3	4	4	4	3	4	3	5	34	71

The Bay Course was partially designed 112 years ago in 1914 by Hugh Irvine Wilson, then finished in 1915 by Donald Ross. It hosted the PGA Championship in 1942, the first of seven majors won by Sam Snead.

== Winners ==
Year	Date	Champion	Country	Score	To par	Margin of victory	Venue	Purse ($)	Winner's share
2026	May 31	Céline Boutier (2)	France	66-72-66=204	−9	1 stroke	Seaview	1,750,000	262,500
2025	Jun 8	Jennifer Kupcho	United States	68-64-66=198	−15	1 stroke	Seaview	1,750,000	262,500
2024	Jun 9	Linnea Ström	Sweden	69-70-60=199	−14	1 stroke	Seaview	1,750,000	262,500
2023	Jun 11	Ashleigh Buhai	South Africa	69-65-65=199	−14	1 stroke	Seaview	1,750,000	262,500
2022	Jun 12	Brooke Henderson	Canada	67-70-64=201	−12	Playoff	Seaview	1,750,000	262,500
2021	Oct 3	Céline Boutier	France	66-70-63=199	−14	1 stroke	Seaview	1,750,000	262,500
2020	Oct 4	Mel Reid	England	68-64-66-67=265	−19	2 strokes	Seaview	1,300,000	195,000
2019	Jun 9	Lexi Thompson	United States	64-70-67=201	−12	1 stroke	Seaview	1,750,000	262,500
2018	Jun 10	Annie Park	United States	69-65-63=197	−16	1 stroke	Seaview	1,750,000	262,500
2017	Jun 4	In-Kyung Kim	South Korea	66-67-69=202	−11	2 strokes	Seaview	1,500,000	225,000
2016	Jun 5	Anna Nordqvist (2)	Sweden	64-68-64=196	−17	1 stroke	Seaview	1,500,000	225,000
2015	May 31	Anna Nordqvist	Sweden	67-69-69=205	−8	1 stroke	Seaview	1,500,000	225,000
2014	Jun 1	Stacy Lewis (2)	United States	67-63-67=197	−16	6 strokes	Seaview	1,500,000	225,000
2013	Jun 2	Karrie Webb	Australia	72-69-68=209	−4	2 strokes	Seaview	1,500,000	225,000
2012	Jun 3	Stacy Lewis	United States	65-65-71=201	−12	4 strokes	Seaview	1,500,000	225,000
2011	Jun 5	Brittany Lincicome	United States	72-64-66=202	−11	1 stroke	Seaview	1,500,000	225,000
2010	Jun 20	Ai Miyazato	Japan	66-67-64=197	−16	2 strokes	Seaview	1,500,000	225,000
2007-2009 - not scheduled
2006	Jun 4	Seon Hwa Lee	South Korea	65-69-63=197	−16	3 strokes	Seaview	1,500,000	225,000
2005	Jun 5	Annika Sörenstam (3)	Sweden	67-65-64=196	−17	4 strokes	Seaview	1,400,000	210,000
2004	Jun 20	Cristie Kerr	United States	66-68-68=202	−11	1 stroke	Seaview	1,300,000	195,000
2003	Jun 29	Angela Stanford	United States	65-67-65=197	−16	3 strokes	Seaview	1,300,000	195,000
2002	Jun 30	Annika Sörenstam (2)	Sweden	68-67-66=201	−12	3 strokes	Seaview	1,200,000	180,000
2001	Jul 1	Betsy King (3)	United States	65-69-67=201	−12	2 strokes	Seaview	1,200,000	180,000
2000	Jul 2	Janice Moodie	Scotland	66-68-69=203	−10	2 strokes	Seaview	1,100,000	165,000
1999	Jun 20	Se Ri Pak	South Korea	63-69-66=198	−15	2 strokes	Seaview	1,000,000	150,000
1998	Jun 26-28	Annika Sörenstam	Sweden	66-65-65=196	−17	4 strokes	Seaview	1,000,000	150,000
1997	Jun 27-29	Michelle McGann	United States	72-65-64=201	−12	3 strokes	Greate Bay	900,000	135,000
1996	Jun 28-30	Dottie Pepper	United States	67-66-69=202	−11	4 strokes	Greate Bay	750,000	112,500
1995	Jun 23-25	Betsy King (2)	United States	66-71-67=204	−9	2 strokes	Greate Bay	650,000	97,500
1994	Jun 24-26	Donna Andrews	United States	67-66-74=207	−6	2 strokes	Greate Bay	500,000	75,000
1993	Jun 25-27	Shelley Hamlin	United States	67-67-70=204	−9	2 strokes	Greate Bay	450,000	67,500
1992	Jun 12-14	Anne Marie Palli	France	69-69-69=207	−6	Playoff	Greate Bay	400,000	60,000
1991	Jun 7-9	Jane Geddes	United States	71-68-69=208	−5	1 stroke	Greate Bay	300,000	45,000
1990	Jun 14-17	Christa Johnson	United States	69-67-69-70=275	−5	2 strokes	Sands	300,000	45,000
1989	Jul 28-30	Nancy Lopez	United States	67-70-69=206	−4	1 stroke	Sands	225,000	33,750
1988	Aug 19-21	Juli Inkster (2)	United States	72-69-65=206	−7	Playoff	Sands	225,000	33,750
1987	Aug 21-23	Betsy King	United States	70-71-66=207	−6	3 strokes	Seaview	225,000	33,750
1986	Aug 22-24	Juli Inkster	United States	67-71-71=209	−4	3 strokes	Seaview	225,000	33,750

Note: Green highlight indicates scoring records.

== Tournament record ==
Year	Player	Score	Round	Course
2024	Linnea Ström	60 (−11)	3rd	Stockton Seaview Golf Club, Bay Course
