= Big Spring Country Club =

Country club in Louisville, Kentucky

Coordinates: 38°13′55″N 85°38′53″W

Big Spring Country Club is a country club located in Louisville Metro. Prior to the 2003 city-county merger, the club's location was in an unincorporated part of Jefferson County, Kentucky, bordered by Louisville (old city) and St. Matthews. The club borders the Middle Fork of Beargrass Creek and the site of Floyd's Station, a fort built by John Floyd in 1779. It was named Big Spring because of a "big spring" which once furnished water for pioneer settlers in the area. This spring, located just below the 13th green of the golf course, is still flowing today.

The club was founded in 1926. The golf course at the club hosted the PGA Championship in 1952, which Jim Turnesa won.
