= Bill Rancic =

American businessman (born 1971)

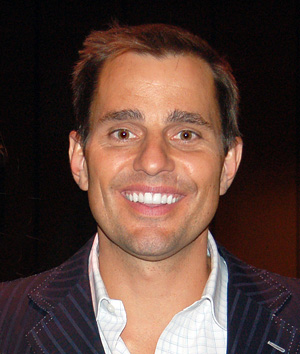
- Rancic in 2010
- Born: William Rancic
- Education: Loyola University Chicago (BS)
- Occupations: Entrepreneur; author; television personality
- Years active: 2004–present
- Spouse: Giuliana DePandi (m. 2007)
- Children: 1
- Website: www.billrancic.com

William "Bill" Rancic (/ˈrænsɪk/ RAN-sick) is an American entrepreneur who was the first candidate hired by The Trump Organization at the conclusion of the first season of Donald Trump's reality television show The Apprentice. He is married to E! News host Giuliana Rancic and currently resides in Chicago, Illinois.

== Early life ==
Rancic was born to Gail and Edward Rancic, who died of cancer in 1999. Rancic has three sisters, Beth, Katie, and Karen. He grew up in the suburb of Orland Park, in a family of Croatian and Irish heritage. His paternal grandfather Nikola Rančić had immigrated to the United States from Split. Rancic attended St. Michael's School and graduated from Carl Sandburg High School. He earned a B.S. from Loyola University Chicago.

== The Apprentice ==
Rancic was one of the job applicants in the first season of The Apprentice during the spring of 2004, as one of 16 contestants. Rancic was hired at the conclusion of the 14-week job interview after Donald Trump selected him over finalist Kwame Jackson.

For the final challenge against competitor Kwame Jackson, Trump gave Rancic the task of running a celebrity golf outing at Trump National Golf Club Westchester in Briarcliff Manor, New York, while Jackson was tasked to manage a Jessica Simpson concert. At the final board meeting, Jackson remarked that running a golf outing was the easier of the two tasks, which brought a disagreement from Trump VP Carolyn Kepcher, who was managing a golf course when Trump hired her. Trump hired Rancic.

Rancic elected to take charge of the construction of the Trump Tower Chicago in his native Chicago, on the site of the demolished Chicago Sun-Times building. His other option was to oversee and manage a new Trump National Golf Course and resort in Los Angeles.

Rancic said that, after his one-year contract as Trump's Apprentice expired, he would leave the job and start his own company. He instead opted to remain part of the Trump Organization, and in some seasons filled in as a judge when regular judge George H. Ross was away on business.

== Career after The Apprentice ==
=== Entertainment ===
In September 2007, Rancic co-hosted iVillage's In the Loop with iVillage, a TV show and webcast produced by NBC Universal. NBC commissioned a set at the Universal Orlando Resort in Florida. In September 2008, Rancic began as host for the A&E reality show We Mean Business, in which small business owners undergo business make-overs.

In 2008, Rancic and his wife, TV host Giuliana Rancic (née DePandi), started a joint television production company, You and I Productions, which produces reality and scripted programming for television. In 2009, they started their own reality-television show Giuliana and Bill which aired on the E! network. In 2010, Rancic started hosting a news program called America Now, which is broadcast across the United States on stations owned by Raycom Media. The following year, "America Now" was brought back for a second season, with Leeza Gibbons joining Bill Rancic. Originally, the show was on every weekend, but when Leeza Gibbons joined the show, it moved to a Monday through Friday timeslot.

In 2012, Rancic became a television spokesperson for the product Rogaine, appearing in national commercials detailing his experience with hair loss. In April 2014, Rancic began hosting the Food Network competitive cooking series Kitchen Casino, where chefs participate in three casino-themed challenges in an attempt to win up to $30,000.

In 2016, Rancic published his first novel, First Light, to mixed reviews.

=== Chicago real estate ===
In 2009, Rancic sold a century-old Gold Coast row house he had bought in 2007, after extensive renovations. In 2011, Rancic sold a condo on the 50th floor of the Park Tower building, on the Magnificent Mile in Chicago, less than 20 months after purchasing the unit.

Rancic owned a home in Hinsdale, Illinois, which was prominently featured on his reality show. He sold it in February 2011 after extensive renovations.

In 2013, Rancic and his wife purchased a 19th-century house on Bellevue Place, which they rehabbed and sold in 2019.

=== Restaurants ===
In August 2011, Rancic and his wife entered into a partnership with Lettuce Entertain You Enterprises to open an Italian restaurant in Chicago. The restaurant was named RPM Italian, and it opened in February 2012 in Chicago's River North District. They opened several more restaurants, including RPM Steak in Chicago, another RPM Italian in Washington, D.C., and a planned RPM On the Water opening in 2019 in Chicago. The restaurants have been popular with celebrities, including Barack Obama and Michelle Obama.

== Personal life ==
In December 2006, he became engaged to Giuliana DePandi, and the couple wed in September 2007 in Chiesa di Santa Sofia, Capri.

On April 23, 2012, Giuliana and Rancic announced on The Today Show that they were expecting their first child via gestational carrier. In August 2012, the couple had a son in Denver, Colorado.

== Published works ==
- Rancic, Bill (2004). You're Hired: How to Succeed in Business and Life from the Winner of The Apprentice. HarperBusiness. ISBN 978-0060765415.
- Rancic, Bill (2005). Beyond the Lemonade Stand. Razorbill. ISBN 1595141030.
- Rancic, Giuliana; Rancic, Bill (2010). I Do, Now What?: Secrets, Stories, and Advice from a Madly-in-Love Couple. Ballantine Books. ISBN 978-0345524997.
- Rancic, Bill (2016). First Light. Putnam. ISBN 978-1101982273.
