= George Kotsiopoulos =

American magazine editor, fashion consultant, stylist and TV personality

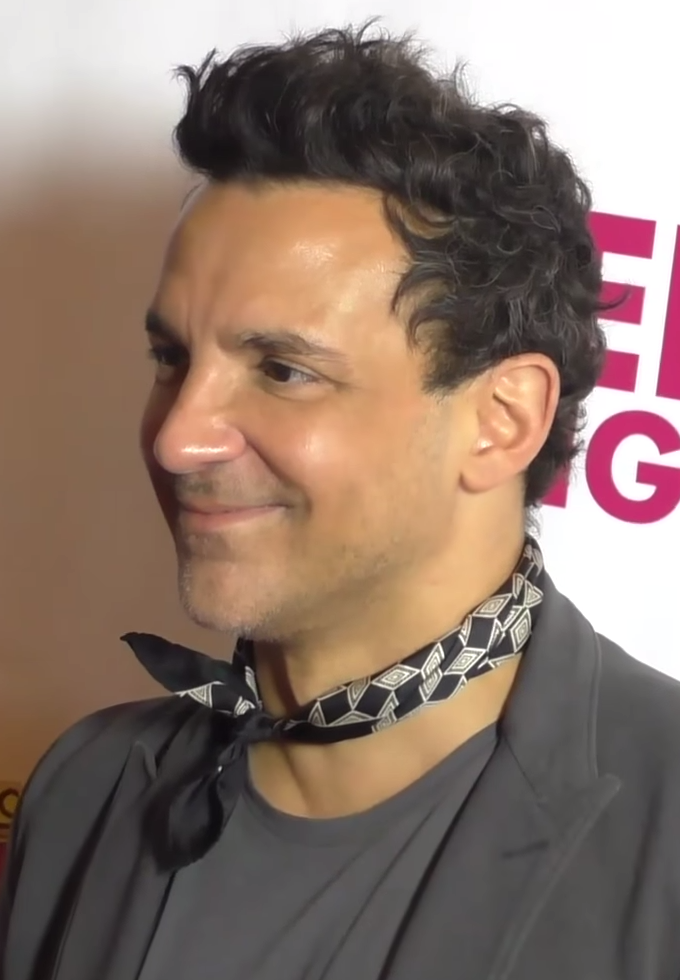
- Kotsiopoulos in 2016
- Born: November 18, 1968 (age 57); Skokie, Illinois, U.S.
- Occupations: Style Expert, Fashion Editor, Television personality
- Height: 5 ft 5 in (165 cm)
- Partner: Kevin Williamson

George Kotsiopoulos (born November 18, 1968) is an American magazine editor, fashion consultant, stylist and television personality. He is style editor at large for C magazine and was a fashion associate at The New York Times Magazine. He was a co-host of Fashion Police.

== Early life ==
Kotsiopoulos was born on November 18, 1968, in Skokie, Illinois, where he was raised. He attended Niles West High School.

He holds a Bachelor's in Accountancy from the University of Illinois at Urbana-Champaign.

Of his formative years, Kotsiopoulos recalled, "I was always interested in arts but my parents were Greek immigrants and to them it was important to be a doctor, lawyer or businessman. But I got my fashion fix from old movies and looking at archival issues of Vogue at the public library. I also used to secretly go shopping with my older sister because she trusted my opinion. But for the most part I pushed art and fashion aside and went to the University of Illinois and got my bachelor's degree in accountancy. I graduated but never took the CPA exam because I was bored to death. Immediately after college I skipped town and moved to Los Angeles."

== Career ==
Kotsiopoulos began his career in Hollywood as a publicist in the entertainment division of Bragman Nyman Cafarelli.

He spent eight years in the style department at T: The New York Times Magazine, based on the West Coast, and ultimately became a Fashion Associate and Market Editor while also producing shoots in Los Angeles and New York, among other places. Said Kotsiopoulos, "I learned everything about fashion during my time at the New York Times."

In 2005 he co-hosted the "Sephora" television pilot for E! Entertainment/Style Networks and was a fashion and style correspondent for MSNBC's "Entertainment Hot List". He has also made television appearances as a fashion expert and stylist on Good Morning America, E! News Daily, KTLA News, Access Hollywood, YourLA, Good Day LA," "American Inventor, House of Boateng, Style Star, How Do I Look, CW Now and Style Her Famous among others.

In 2008, Kotsiopoulos worked with the now defunct RestlessStyle.com, an online fashion and lifestyle magazine launched by the daytime soap opera The Young and the Restless. He has appeared as himself several times on the show, most recently in episodes that aired in August 2012.

In September 2010, Kotsiopoulos joined Joan Rivers, Giuliana Rancic and Kelly Osbourne as co-host of Fashion Police airing on E! Entertainment Television. On his casting, Kotsiopoulos said, "It's my first television show as a series regular. I've done pilots before, I've done a bunch of various shows. When I was approached for this show, I was slightly hesitant for a second because I was worried - I was thinking, how am I gonna criticize all of these people that I'm gonna work with, and my friends, who are stylists. How am I gonna do that? Ultimately, you have to take a different direction in your life, in your career. I very quickly realized this was not an opportunity I could let pass by."

In March, 2011, The Hollywood Reporter ranked Kotsiopoulos 19th out of The 25 Most Powerful Stylists in Hollywood.

In June 2012, in a red-carpet interview, Kotsiopoulos confirmed he was working on an untitled clothing line.

In May 2013, Kotsiopoulos made a cameo appearance with comedian Joan Rivers in the film Iron Man 3.

In January 2014, Kotsiopoulos published his first book Glamorous by George. The illustrated tome offers straightforward tips and advice for looking and feeling like a movie star by helping readers find and wear their ideal style on a reasonable budget.

== Personal life ==
In 2011, Kotsiopoulos was included in the OUT100, Out's 17th annual list of the 100 most influential gay men and women.

== Charity work ==
In 2003, Kotsiopoulos co-founded the annual "Bag Lunch" charity event for P.S. ARTS, a non-profit organization dedicated to restoring arts education to the public school system of which he is on the Board of Directors. More than 200 designer handbags are donated to and auctioned at this event, which Kostiopoulos co-hosts, with one hundred percent of the proceeds going to P.S. ARTS.
