= Kitchen Casino =

- Genre: Reality, Cooking
- Starring: Bill Rancic
- Country of origin: United States
- Original language: English
- No. of seasons: 1
- No. of episodes: 8

Production
- Running time: 60 Minutes
- Production company: Jane Street Entertainment

Original release
- Network: Food Network
- Release: April 7 – June 1, 2014

Kitchen Casino was a cooking reality television series hosted by Bill Rancic that premiered on April 7, 2014, on Food Network. Similar to short-form cooking reality shows, it features four chefs challenged to cook gourmet dishes to be judged by two guest celebrities. The chefs participate in four "casino-themed" rounds of play in order to win a possible final prize of $30,000.

The series initially aired new episodes on Monday evenings at 9:00PM ET on Food Network. Beginning May 11, the series moved its premiere showings to Sunday nights at 11:00PM ET. To date, no new episodes beyond the original first season of eight are being produced, and repeat runs are scheduled for Thursday mornings at 4:00 am EST starting October 8, 2014. No announcement has been made concerning a second season of the show.

== Format ==
Each episode of Kitchen Casino features four chefs undergoing three "casino-themed" cooking challenges. After the dishes are prepared, the two guest judges evaluate each dish, scoring it on a scale of 1 to 5. This makes for a possible score range of 2 (lowest) to 10 (highest).

=== Round 1: Chef Slots ===
Host Rancic "spins" a video slot machine to reveal three elements each chef must use for their initial dish: a style of cuisine (such as Italian or Indian), a main ingredient (such as pineapple or coffee) and a theme (such as Breakfast, Luau, or Cocktail Party). The chefs are given 30 minutes to create their dish.

At approximately the 8-minute mark, Rancic "spins" the slot machine again, this time revealing three words that describe a new ingredient that must be included in the dish in addition to the main ingredient. These words are a flavor or taste (sweet, spicy, etc.), a color (red, white, grey, etc.), and a texture (smooth, sour, etc.).

When the time expires, the chefs must have their plates completed. (Any chef who continues to work on their plate after time expires can be penalized in their score for the round.) The main focus of judging for this round is how well each chef incorporated all four elements (style, main ingredient, theme, and extra ingredient) into their dish, as well as overall flavor. The chef who scores lowest of the four "goes bust" and is eliminated.

=== Round 2: Chef Roulette ===
The remaining three chefs are shown a main protein by host Rancic, in which they must create a "signature dish" using that protein that best represents their style of cooking. They are given 40 minutes in which to create their dish. Their cooking stations are situated on a large turntable, the "Roulette Wheel".

Several times during the 40-minute period, an alarm will sound. When this happens, the chefs must step away from their stations. The "Roulette Wheel" then activates, spinning the stations into new, presumably-random, positions. The chefs must then continue working at the new station, using all the ingredients the original chef was using, but still making the dish their own. (In the episodes that have so far aired, this comes to three spins in the 40-minute period, with the third spin most often—but not always—landing the stations back in front of their original chefs, but with having stopped in front of both other chefs and having them trying to adapt the dish to their style.) Within the last 10 minutes, a second "Jackpot" signal sounds, announcing that the "Roulette Wheel" is now "locked down", and the dish they are now working on will be the one they present to the judges.

As before, the chefs must have their dishes completed once time expires. Adaptability is the key determinant in this round, as the chefs must show they could still present their style of dish after it has gone through the other chefs' machinations. As before, the lowest-scoring chef "goes bust" and is eliminated.

=== Round 3: Chef Poker ===
In a culinary version of "Texas Hold 'Em", host Rancic shuffles a deck of cards, each of which contains an ingredient. Three of these cards are dealt to the center of the "Poker Table". The ingredients on these three cards must be used by BOTH remaining chefs in their final dishes. In addition, the host deals two "Hole Cards" to each chef, showing two possible additional ingredients that the chef must also use. Each chef has the option of (a) keeping both Hole Cards and using the ingredients they've been dealt, or (b) exchanging one or both cards for new cards with different ingredients from the remaining cards in the deck. They must now use these new ingredients in place of the ones they discarded.

The chefs have 30 minutes to complete these final dishes. The higher-scoring chef wins the competition and earns $1,000 for each point they earned in this final dish, for a possible top winnings of $10,000.

=== Final Round: The High Rollers Wheel ===
The winning chef has the option to "cash out" and take their winnings as is, or risk them on the "High Rollers Wheel". This is a carnival wheel with 16 spaces laid out counter-clockwise as follows: JACKPOT, BUST, ADD $2000, PUSH, ADD $2000, ADD $1000, SPIN AGAIN, PUSH, ADD $5000, DOUBLE, PUSH, DOUBLE, ADD $2000, ADD $1000, PUSH, ?. If the chef wants to risk their winnings, they spin the wheel counter-clockwise. The spin must make at least one complete revolution to qualify. (The wheel is re-spun if the spin does not qualify, but this is edited out of the show.)

If the wheel lands on BUST, the chef forfeits their winnings and leaves with nothing. On PUSH, the chef earns no additional money and leaves with their original winnings. Landing on any ADD $XXXX space adds that amount to their winnings. The ? Space adds a mysterious amount to the chef's winnings, up to an additional $10,000. A DOUBLE space doubles the winnings of the chef, and the JACKPOT space triples the chef's winnings, up to a possible top winnings of $30,000. SPIN AGAIN forces the chef to re-spin the wheel.

== Episodes ==
=== Season 1 ===
| Episode # | Episode Title | Original Air Date | Episode/Production # |
|---|---|---|---|
| 1 | High Steaks | April 7, 2014 | KK0103H |
| 2 | Game of Bones | April 14, 2014 | KK0102H |
| 3 | All In | April 21, 2014 | KK0105H |
| 4 | House of Cards | April 28, 2014 | KK0104H |
| 5 | High Risk, High Reward | May 11, 2014 | KK0101H |
| 6 | Fear and Searing | May 18, 2014 | KK0107H |
| 7 | Aw Shucks | May 26, 2014 | KK0106H |
| 8 | Kiss My Bass | June 1, 2014 | KK0108H |
