= Fashion Police =

American television series

- Genre: Talk show
- Developed by: Lisa Cutone Bacon
- Written by: Tony Tripoli; Justin Martindale
- Directed by: Fred Mendes
- Starring: Joan Rivers; Melissa Rivers; George Kotsiopoulos; NeNe Leakes; Margaret Cho; Brad Goreski; Giuliana Rancic; Kelly Osbourne; Kathy Griffin
- Country of origin: United States
- Original language: English
- No. of seasons: 7
- No. of episodes: 216

Production
- Executive producers: Gary Snegaroff; Jay James; Lisa Bacon; Melissa Rivers
- Production location: Los Angeles, California
- Camera setup: Multi-camera
- Running time: 30 minutes (2010–12); 60 minutes (2012–2017)

Original release
- Network: E!
- Release: September 10, 2010 – November 27, 2017

Fashion Police is an American television series that premiered on September 10, 2010, on E!. It was originally hosted by Joan Rivers and featured panelists George Kotsiopoulos, Giuliana Rancic, and Kelly Osbourne commenting on celebrity fashions.

== Background ==
In 2010, the series premiered on E! with the program running the day after events, rather than airing live from the red carpet. The series became a weekly program on September 10, 2010, where they continued to discuss the dos and don’ts of celebrity fashion. The show started as a half-hour program but expanded to one hour on March 9, 2012.

Rivers died on September 4, 2014; two weeks later, it was announced that the series would continue without her. On December 1, 2014, E! announced that comedian Kathy Griffin would replace Rivers as host starting in January 2015. She was joined by celebrity fashion stylist Brad Goreski, who replaced panelist George Kotsiopoulos. Griffin's debut episode, following the 2015 Golden Globes, was watched by 912,000 viewers. The episode following the 21st Screen Actors Guild Awards, on January 26, 2015, was watched by 686,000 viewers.

Kathy Griffin succeeded Rivers after a three-month hiatus following Rivers' death in September 2014, while Brad Goreski replaced Kotsiopoulos upon its relaunch. Osbourne departed the program in late February 2015 after the post-Oscars special show on February 23, citing her decision to "pursue other opportunities". Shortly after, Griffin announced her departure from the show in March 2015 after filming only seven episodes.

In March 2015, E! announced that the show would remain on hiatus until September 2015, in order to revamp the series and replace the vacant panelist positions, following the departure of Griffin and Osbourne.

In June 2015, it was announced the series would return on August 31, 2015, and would feature Melissa Rivers as a new co-host and would return for six episodes with both Goreski and Rancic returning, with a search commencing for a fourth panelist. For the sixth season, Margaret Cho and NeNe Leakes joined the panel.

The final episode of the series aired on November 27, 2017 with 457,000 viewers.

== Hosts ==
=== Timeline ===
Co-host	Seasons							
Co-host	2010	2011	2012	2013	2014	2015	2016	2017
Joan Rivers †								
Giuliana Rancic								
George Kotsiopoulos								
Kelly Osbourne								
Kathy Griffin								
Melissa Rivers								
Brad Goreski								
NeNe Leakes								
Margaret Cho								

=== Departures ===
In March 2015, Kelly Osbourne departed the program in late February 2015 after the February 23rd post-Oscars special show, citing her decision to "pursue other opportunities". Shortly after, Griffin announced her departure from the show in March 2015 after filming only seven episodes. E! announced that the show would remain on hiatus until September 2015, in order to revamp the series and replace the vacant panelist positions, following the departure of Griffin and Osbourne.

== Segments ==
Regular segments include:

- The Five Must-See Looks of the Week, the five outfits that stood out (either by being good or bad) generally worn by Hollywood celebrities during the week in review.
- Bitch Stole My Look, in which two or more stars are shown to have worn the same outfit on different occasions. Rivers and the panelists discuss the stars in question and declare which person looked best in the outfit. Both the loser and the winner may be subject to ridicule, with the winner being chosen as the lesser of two evils.
- Busted!, in which celebrities are caught wearing the same outfit at two or more different events.
- Gotta Have It!, Make It Stop!, in which new trends among celebrities are discussed deciding whether we should have them or make them stop.
- Hot Ticket, in which the panelist discuss looks by celebrities shown at the premiere of a movie or a Hollywood event.
- Slut Cut, in which Rivers and the panelist dishes on celebrities choosing to cut their dresses shorter than the original runway length. (until 2010)
- Starlet or Streetwalker, in which a photograph of a person with their face obscured is presented, often the person in question will sport revealing or disheveled clothing. Rivers and the panelists have a paddle with "Starlet" written on one side and "Streetwalker" on the other. They then take turns guessing which of the two they think the person in the photo may be, before their identity—or lack thereof—is revealed.
- Guess Me from Behind, where the hosts guess a celebrity based solely from their behind.
- 360 Degree Glam Cam, a specialty segment during E! Entertainment's, Live from the Red Carpet. There is a dedicated platform for celebrities pose, while a camera is rotated in a full circle around them in order to capture the entirely of the celebrity wardrobe. This gives both the audience and the hosts of Fashion Police optimal coverage of the outfit. (Began in 2009)

New segments from March 9, 2012, along with an all-new hour of truth of Fashion Police:

- Look Who's Trending, a weekly segment where the hosts talk about the latest celebrities' fashion dishes, news, and/or trends, majoritically from Twitter.
- Ad Sanity, in which the hosts guess and talk about a celebrity ad based on one thing, "What do they want to tell & sell in ad?".
- Fan Find, in which the hosts talk about one picture that is sent from the Fashion Police fans via Twitter with #FanFind.

== Criticism ==
=== Writers' wages controversy ===
In early April 2013, writers for the show complained to the state of California, alleging that the network was breaking state law by not compensating them for regular wages and overtime. According to the writers, their paychecks state that they worked eight hours each week, regardless of their actual working time. In response to the complaint, the network said "E! values our Fashion Police writers and we pay them fairly and in full legal compliance." On April 13, the writers at the show went on strike.

=== Zendaya controversy ===
On February 27, 2015, E! confirmed Osbourne's exit, citing her decision to "pursue other opportunities". However, days earlier, Osbourne had tweeted that she was upset and was questioning whether she would stay with the show, following jokes made by Rancic concerning singer and Disney Channel star Zendaya, in reference to her hair smelling of "patchouli oil" and "weed" at the 87th Academy Awards. She also tweeted: "you guys do realize that @Zendaya is my friend right?". On March 12, 2015, it was announced that Griffin would also be departing the series after only seven episodes. Griffin cited that she felt her style of humor "did not fit well" with the series' creative direction. The network announced in March 2015 their decision to keep the series on hiatus until September 2015, in order to revamp the series with new panelists.
