= The Apprentice (American TV series) season 1 =

The Apprentice
- Season 1
- No. of contestants: 16
- Winner: Bill Rancic
- Runner-up: Kwame Jackson
- No. of episodes: 15

Release
- Original network: NBC
- Original release: January 8 – April 15, 2004

Additional information
- Filming dates: September 2003 – October 2003, April 15, 2004

Season chronology
- Next → Season 2

The first season of The Apprentice aired on NBC in the winter and spring of 2004. It featured 16 candidates.

This season had high ratings, ranking at No. 7 in the average weekly Nielsen Rankings, with an average viewership of 20.7 million viewers each week. The final episode of the season was seen by an estimated 28.05 million viewers and ranked as the No. 1 show of the week, beating out a new episode of CSI. It was the most popular new show of 2004.

== Summary ==
Season one had real estate magnate Donald Trump as the show's executive producer and host.

The season started with 16 contestants, eight men and eight women from around the United States. Each had been successful in various enterprises, including real estate, restaurant management, political consulting, and sales. During the show, the contestants lived communally in a suite on the fourth floor at Trump Tower in Manhattan. Elimination took the form of one contestant being "fired" by Trump at the conclusion of each week's episode. Filming the entire season took three months.

The contestants were originally divided into two "corporations" by gender. The men chose to name their company "Versacorp", and the women chose to name their company "Protégé Corporation".

Each week, Trump assigned the teams a task. Each team selected a "project manager" to lead them in the week's assigned task. The winning team received a reward, while the losing team faced a boardroom showdown with Trump and two of his associates in order to determine which team member would be fired.

Elimination proceeded in two stages. In the first stage, Trump confronted the losing team and required the week's project manager to select two additional team members which the project manager believed were most responsible for the loss.

The rest of the team was dismissed (allowed to go back up to the suite, because they were safe to stay for the next round), and the project manager and the two other selected members faced a final confrontation several minutes later in which Trump fired one of the three. Trump is now well known for his catchphrase "You're fired!", and he sought to trademark the phrase in 2004. George Ross and Carolyn Kepcher, executive vice presidents for the Trump Organization, observed the teams during each task, and advised Trump on who needed to be fired each episode during boardroom sessions.

== Candidates ==
Both teams, or "corporations", were divided by their gender.

| Candidate | Background | Original team | Age | Hometown | Result |
|---|---|---|---|---|---|
| Bill Rancic | Cigar business owner | Versacorp | 32 | Chicago, Illinois | Hired by Trump (4–15–2004) |
| Kwame Jackson | Investment manager | Versacorp | 29 | Charlotte, North Carolina | Fired in the season finale (4–15–2004) |
| Amelia "Amy" Henry | Account manager | Protégé | 30 | Austin, Texas | Fired in week 13 (4–1–2004) |
| Nick Warnock | Copier salesman | Versacorp | 27 | Los Angeles, California | Fired in week 13 (4–1–2004) |
| Troy McClain | Mortgage broker | Versacorp | 32 | Boise, Idaho | Fired in week 12 (3–25–2004) |
| Katrina Campins | Real estate agent | Protégé | 24 | Coral Gables, Florida | Fired in week 11 (3–18–2004) |
| Heidi Bressler | Senior account executive | Protégé | 30 | Philadelphia, Pennsylvania | Fired in week 10 (3–11–2004) |
| Omarosa Manigault-Stallworth | Political consultant | Protégé | 29 | Youngstown, Ohio | Fired in week 9 (3–4–2004) |
| Ereka Vetrini | Marketing manager | Protégé | 27 | New York, New York | Fired in week 8 (2–26–2004) |
| Tammy Lee | Stockbroker | Protégé | 36 | Seattle, Washington | Fired in week 7 (2–19–2004) |
| Jessie Conners | Marketing firm owner | Protégé | 21 | New Richmond, Wisconsin | Fired in week 6 (2–12–2004) |
| Kristi Frank | Restaurant owner | Protégé | 30 | Bel Air, California | Fired in week 5 (2–5–2004) |
| Bowie Hogg | Account executive | Versacorp | 25 | Arlington, Texas | Fired in week 4 (1–29–2004) |
| Sam Solovey | Business director | Versacorp | 27 | Chevy Chase, Maryland | Fired in week 3 (1–22–2004) |
| Jason Curis | Real estate manager | Versacorp | 24 | Detroit, Michigan | Fired in week 2 (1–15–2004) |
| David Gould | Venture capitalist | Versacorp | 31 | New York, New York | Fired in week 1 (1–8–2004) |

== Weekly results ==
| Candidate | Original team | Week 5 team | Week 7 team | Week 9 team | Week 11 team | Final week team | Application result | Record as project manager |
| Bill Rancic | Versacorp | Versacorp | Versacorp | Versacorp | Protégé | Versacorp | Hired by Trump | 2–0 (win in weeks 6 & 10) |
| Kwame Jackson | Versacorp | Protégé | Protégé | Protégé | Protégé | Protégé | Fired in the season finale | 1–2 (win in week 11, loss in weeks 4 & 9) |
| Amelia "Amy" Henry | Protégé | Versacorp | Protégé | Versacorp | Versacorp | Versacorp | Fired in week 13 | 1–1 (win in week 2, loss in week 11) |
| Nick Warnock | Versacorp | Versacorp | Versacorp | Versacorp | Versacorp | Versacorp | Fired in week 13 | 3–0 (win in weeks 5, 9 & 12) |
| Troy McClain | Versacorp | Protégé | Protégé | Protégé | Protégé | Protégé | Fired in week 12 | 1–3 (win in week 7, loss in weeks 1, 10 & 12) |
| Katrina Campins | Protégé | Versacorp | Versacorp | Versacorp | Versacorp | Versacorp | Fired in week 11 | 1–1 (win in week 4, loss in week 7) |
| Heidi Bressler | Protégé | Protégé | Protégé | Protégé | | Protégé | Fired in week 10 | 1–0 (win in week 8) |
| Omarosa Manigault-Stallworth | Protégé | Protégé | Protégé | Protégé | | Protégé | Fired in week 9 | 0–1 (loss in week 6) |
| Ereka Vetrini | Protégé | Versacorp | Versacorp | | | | Fired in week 8 | 1–1 (win in week 1, loss in week 8) |
| Tammy Lee | Protégé | Versacorp | Versacorp | | | | Fired in week 7 | |
| Jessie Conners | Protégé | Protégé | | | | | Fired in week 6 | 1–0 (win in week 3) |
| Kristi Frank | Protégé | Protégé | | | | | Fired in week 5 | 0–1 (loss in week 5) |
| Bowie Hogg | Versacorp | | | | | | Fired in week 4 | |
| Sam Solovey | Versacorp | | | | | | Fired in week 3 | 0–1 (loss in week 3) |
| Jason Curis | Versacorp | | | | | | Fired in week 2 | 0–1 (loss in week 2) |
| David Gould | Versacorp | | | | | | Fired in week 1 | |

== Elimination table ==
Elimination chart
| No. | Candidate | 1 | 2 | 3 | 4 | 5 | 6 | 7 | 8 | 9 | 10 | 11 | 12 | 13 | 14 |
|---|---|---|---|---|---|---|---|---|---|---|---|---|---|---|---|
| 1 | Bill | IN | IN | IN | IN | IN | WIN | BR | BR | IN | WIN | IN | IN | ADV | HIRED |
| 2 | Kwame | IN | IN | BR | LOSE | IN | IN | IN | IN | LOSE | IN | WIN | BR | ADV | FIRED |
| 3 | Amy | IN | WIN | IN | IN | IN | IN | IN | IN | IN | IN | LOSE | IN | FIRED | |
| 4 | Nick | IN | BR | IN | BR | WIN | IN | IN | BR | WIN | IN | IN | WIN | FIRED | |
| 5 | Troy | LOSE | IN | IN | IN | IN | IN | WIN | IN | IN | LOSE | IN | FIRED | | |
| 6 | Katrina | IN | IN | IN | WIN | IN | IN | LOSE | IN | IN | IN | FIRED | | | |
| 7 | Heidi | IN | IN | IN | IN | BR | BR | IN | WIN | BR | FIRED | | | | |
| 8 | Omarosa | IN | IN | IN | IN | BR | LOSE | IN | IN | FIRED | | | | | |
| 9 | Ereka | WIN | IN | IN | IN | IN | IN | IN | FIRED | | | | | | |
| 10 | Tammy | IN | IN | IN | IN | IN | IN | FIRED | | | | | | | |
| 11 | Jessie | IN | IN | WIN | IN | IN | FIRED | | | | | | | | |
| 12 | Kristi | IN | IN | IN | IN | FIRED | | | | | | | | | |
| 13 | Bowie | IN | IN | BR | FIRED | | | | | | | | | | |
| 14 | Sam | BR | BR | FIRED | | | | | | | | | | | |
| 15 | Jason | IN | FIRED | | | | | | | | | | | | |
| 16 | David | FIRED | | | | | | | | | | | | | |

The candidate was on the winning team for this task / they passed the Interviews stage.
The candidate was on the losing team.
The candidate was hired and won the competition.
The candidate won as project manager on his/her team.
The candidate lost as project manager on his/her team.
The candidate was brought to the final boardroom.
The candidate was fired.
The candidate lost as project manager and was fired.

== Weekly summary ==
=== Week 1: "Meet the Billionaire" ===
- Air date: January 8, 2004
- Task: Starting with seed money of $250, purchase supplies and sell lemonade on the streets of New York.
- Judges: Donald Trump; Carolyn Kepcher; George H. Ross
- Monologue: Location, Location, Location – Any product sales depends on the location, it has to reach the right target demographic.
- Protégé project manager: Ereka
- Versacorp project manager: Troy
- Winning team: Protégé
  - Reasons for win: The women nearly quintupled their money. They stay in Midtown and use the promises of kisses to sell lemonade for five dollars a glass, giving them a total of over $1,200.
  - Reward: Visit Donald Trump in his penthouse suite, taking in the pleasures of true fortune.
- Losing team: Versacorp
  - Reasons for loss: Versacorp only doubled their money, giving them a total of $500, as they chose a bad location, by the Fulton Fish Market, and priced their lemonade too low. While they eventually found a better location and started selling the lemonade at a slightly higher price, it was far too late to have any hope of recovering the task. In addition, David and Sam proved to be extremely poor salesmen, selling less than $10 between them.
- Dramatic tension: Versacorp member Sam begins to get on the other's nerves by his crazy antics, including fruitlessly trying to sell a single glass of lemonade for $1,000, even though he nearly succeeded.
- Sent to boardroom: Troy, Sam, and David
- Fired: David Gould – for selling the least on the team, admitting in the boardroom that sales was not his forte and for not stepping up or taking initiative as Troy and Sam had. Despite criticizing Troy's leadership and his decisions along with Sam's strange behavior, Trump felt that they had at least showed some initiative, while David had been very passive and otherwise demonstrated no skills that would be of any use to Trump.
- Notes:
  - Episode recap from NBC.com
  - Though originally 90 minutes long, the repeated airing of the episode was cut to 60 minutes.
  - 18.5 million people watched this episode's initial airing, fulfilling NBC's expectations for the much-anticipated premiere. In fact, the series premiere came in 7th place for the week it aired.
  - When Versacorp enters the boardroom, Trump is already sitting in his chair. This is the only Apprentice episode ever where Trump arrives in the boardroom before the candidates.
  - While Sam's attempt to sell a glass of lemonade for $1,000 alienated his team-mates and was a big factor in his being brought back to the boardroom by Troy, such attempts to sell everyday goods for vastly inflated prices would become commonplace in the later Celebrity Apprentice editions of the show.

This episode's task is introduced at the New York Stock Exchange Building on Wall Street.

=== Week 2: "Sex, Lies and Altitude" ===
- Air date: January 15, 2004
- Task sponsor: Marquis Jet Card
- Task: Both teams are to design an advertising campaign to sell private jet service, which they must pitch to the owner of the company and Donny Deutsch.
- Judges: Donald Trump; Carolyn Kepcher; George H. Ross
- Monologue: Do Not Deal With Underlings – Trump learned early in his career making deals can be tough and you have to work with the boss where ever possible.
- Protégé project manager: Amy
- Versacorp project manager: Jason
- Winning team: Protégé
  - Reasons for win: Amy and Ereka personally met with Marquis Jet's president and learned that nothing was off limits for their ad. This led to Tammy headlining their campaign with heavy sexual undertones, while depicting parts of the aircraft in black and white artistic shots. The women also pitched their ads while wearing flashy flight attendant outfits.
  - Reward: A trip to Boston in a private jet and dinner at a fancy restaurant.
- Losing team: Versacorp
  - Reasons for loss: Due to Jason's decision not to meet with the president, the men chose to create a conventional campaign, complete with photos of the cockpit and passengers designed to illustrate the utility and convenience of the service. While Donny Deutsch and the Marquis Jet executives felt that the campaign was generally executed competently, they dismissed it as being completely unoriginal.
  - Dramatic tension: Sam further aggravates his team members and is excoriated for taking a nap on the floor during the task. This was a negative brought up by both Jason and Trump itself, but was also noted clearly that this was not the reason Versacorp lost the challenge.
  - Sent to boardroom: Jason, Sam, and Nick
  - Trump's Thoughts: Nick strongly defended Jason during the internal review, but was brought back into the final boardroom, in what Trump suspected was an attempt to have Nick advocate for Jason to stay. In any event, the move backfired when Nick angrily demanded to know why he was in the final boardroom, and Jason was unable to justify his decision, lamely telling Nick that it had to be "someone" alongside his clear target Sam. Trump told Sam he's been a disaster and no one on his team respects him. In the end, Trump considered Jason's failure to meet with the client too fatal an error to be ignored.
- Fired: Jason Curis – for not meeting with the president at the start of the task, which caused the team to lose. Also, Trump did not like the fact that Nick, the "one guy" that defended Jason, was brought back into the boardroom.
- Notes:
  - Jason did not see the point of meeting the client for their campaign, while several of his teammates did, and Trump himself was aghast that Jason did not meet with company's owner at the beginning and thereby learn that Deutsch and the executives wanted a flashier campaign.
  - The women's reward became short-lived from a heat of tension that Omarosa instigated with Ereka. After Omarosa called Ereka emotionally unstable, Ereka stated that this was a case of "[the pot] calling the kettle black", which Omarosa interpreted as racism. After the season ended Omarosa tried to imply that Ereka and another candidate had used even stronger racist insults off-camera, though no evidence of this was ever found during a review of the production tapes. Vetrini has stated that contestants are almost always on camera or being audio-recorded during production, and that such an event, if it occurred, would have been aired to garner ratings.
  - This episode is the first time that the project manager has the words "Project Manager" in their name at the bottom of the screen instead of their actual occupation.
  - 20.2 million people watched this episode's initial airing.

=== Week 3: "Respect" ===
- Air date: January 22, 2004
- Task: The teams are given a scavenger list of items which they are required to purchase during the day at the lowest possible total price.
- Judges: Donald Trump; Carolyn Kepcher; George H. Ross
- Monologue: The Art of Negotiation – Buying the right thing at your price, fitting it into the budget.
- Protégé project manager: Jessie
- Versacorp project manager: Sam
  - In a "put up or shut up" maneuver, Sam is appointed project manager by the men, as Bill states Sam will either lead the team to an incredible victory and redeem himself or a crushing defeat and get fired. He splits the men into two teams, with him and two others staying back at the suite to perform research by phone and over the web while the "field team" would take that research and use it to make great deals.
- Winning team: Protégé
  - Reasons for win: The women also split into two groups, but they had everyone in the field (unlike the men) and each team deployed into a different part of the city. While some of the women attempted to use their sex appeal to seduce the sellers into selling items at a nice discount, Amy was able to find a huge bargain when buying a golf club. They negotiated an average saving of 22% on the list price of their items.
  - Reward: Dinner at the 21 Club restaurant.
- Losing team: Versacorp
  - Reasons for loss: The men only negotiated an average saving of 9%, largely because they had to carry out most of their deals at the last minute and didn't have time to properly negotiate the prices. In addition, Sam's obsession with buying the gold first at the expense of other items and his poor research skills (he got a phone number for a store that didn't sell golf clubs and then sent them to a store that wasn't amenable to bargaining to a lower price) doomed the men.
  - Sent to boardroom: Sam, Kwame, and Bowie
- Trump's comments: Trump is displeased at the men's failure for the third week in a row. In particular, he felt that Sam's decision to send his team members away from other tasks to buy the gold bar (which would have a very small discount compared to the other items on the list) was one of the primary reasons the team did not succeed. He also wasn't happy about Sam bringing Bowie and Kwame (who were the most critical of Sam, with Kwame bluntly saying he did not respect Sam and needed to be fired if lack of respect for Sam was a sticking point) instead of Nick (who was the nicest to Sam and was also equally responsible for poor research) back into the boardroom. Sam's desperate declarations that the team didn't respect him, which seemed designed to have Trump aim his anger at the team for being mean to Sam, didn't work because Trump saw the disrespect not as bullying but a legitimate reaction to Sam's crummy performance as the PM.
- Fired: Sam Solovey – for being in the final boardroom three weeks in a row, being incredibly difficult to work with, having no respect from his team as a leader and not being any good as a follower either, negotiating for the gold bar instead of other items that would have been easier to bargain for, bringing Kwame back instead of Nick and for letting his emotions affect his decision-making.
- Dramatic tension: Ereka and Omarosa fought in the previous episode, and it continues in this episode, and Katrina stepped in and tried to make them reconcile, unsuccessfully. Amy said it might be worth losing a task at some point to get rid of Omarosa.
- Notes:
  - Episode recap from NBC.com
  - Sam's firing in this episode was named number 96 on TV Guide / TV Land's 100 Most Memorable TV Moments in December 2004. Trump says his trademark dismissal quote, "You're fired!" three times to Sam, who famously stared for an extended duration of time until Trump further prompts them to leave.

=== Week 4: "Ethics Schmethics" ===
- Air date: January 29, 2004
- Task sponsors: Planet Hollywood
- Task: The teams are required to collectively manage the Planet Hollywood restaurant in Times Square on successive evenings, with the performance judged by the increase in profits over the same day the previous year.
- Judges: Donald Trump; Carolyn Kepcher; George H. Ross
- Monologue: A Deal is a Deal – Once the handshake has been made, it has to be honored.
- Protégé project manager: Katrina
- Versacorp project manager: Kwame
- Dramatic tension: During the women's day at Planet Hollywood, Katrina felt saddened that Jessie was frustrated that she wasn't leading, which she felt it was misleading. Then after resolving the conflict, the managers from the restaurant were a little upset as they felt women "selling shots" was too much. And warned them that if any of the guests leave the Planet Hollywood and pass out, then they're in a liability. The men kept several of their members on the sidewalk hawking coupons and selling basketballs autographed by Kwame, under the assumption that he was a celebrity. Nick strongly disagrees with this ploy and therefore contributed less in the task. His lack of enthusiasm was strongly criticized by the members of his team, as well as Trump. Bill later argued with Troy and Kwame and felt their actions fell into "a grey area".
- Winning team: Protégé
  - Reasons for win: The women (who went first) again used their sexual appeal to increase sales. Heidi identified that focusing on selling liquor would have the largest profit margin, which led to the team earning about $16,000 of profit, increasing the restaurant's sales by 31%.
  - Reward: Protégé won a trip to a top-notch golf course where they enjoyed the driving range and the course. There, Donald Trump and Carolyn informed the ladies that they have more to show than just their sex appeal and that he would like to see more of that.
- Losing team: Versacorp
  - Reasons for loss: Despite having a day more to plan than the women, the men went into the task without any real sales strategy. Only late in the day did they decide to focus on selling merchandise, the profit margin of which paled in comparison to the liquor that the women focused on. They only got $14,000 in profit, only raising the sales by 6%.
  - Sent to boardroom: Kwame, Bowie, and Nick
  - Trump's comments: Increasing alcohol into sales was the goal, which the men missed the mark.
- Fired: Bowie Hogg – for failing to effectively push the merchandise at Planet Hollywood, but also because he did not present himself as a leader to the same extent as the other two candidates in the boardroom. Trump was disappointed in Kwame, but nonetheless allowed him to stay for another task. He was also critical of Nick, but wanted to see him perform as the project manager for the next task.
- Notes:
  - Episode recap from NBC.com
  - 18.9 million people watched this episode's initial airing, which came in 6th place for the week.
  - While everyone else was overjoyed when Sam was voted out, Nick was disgusted by their reactions and stated that Sam would get vengeance through him.
  - This is Versacorp's fourth loss in a row. After this episode, Versacorp has lost half of its members within the first four weeks, and therefore the team is now down to four members (Bill, Kwame, Nick, Troy) and has lost four members (David, Jason, Sam, Bowie).

=== Week 5: "Trading Places" ===
- Air date: February 5, 2004
- Corporate reshuffle: Because the men lost 4 tasks in a row and lost four players, the teams are reorganized, with the names retained but now mixed by sex. For Versacorp, Nick begins by selecting Amy, then takes Bill, Katrina, Ereka and Tammy. For Protégé, Kristi begins by selecting Troy, then takes Jessie, Kwame, Heidi, and Omarosa by default as the last person left.
- Task: Starting with seed money, the teams are required to purchase items and sell them at the greatest profit return at an open-air flea market.
- Judges: Donald Trump; Carolyn Kepcher; Bernie Diamond
- Monologue: Stand Up for Yourself – No one else is going to fight for you.
- Protégé project manager: Kristi
- Versacorp project manager: Nick
- Winning team: Versacorp
  - Reasons for win: Despite waiting for weather issues of having the location outdoors, they yielded a profit of over $600, whereas Protégé finished in the red. Nick, with help from Katrina, decided to go "dumpster diving" finding objects such as a clothes rack for free.
  - Reward: A tour of the Yankee Stadium.
- Losing team: Protégé
  - Reasons for loss: Kristi decided on what she called a "divide and conquer" strategy, which involved buying up huge amounts of different items in an attempt to appeal to everyone. However, the strategy ended in disaster when the team was unable to sell enough to overcome their large initial spend. On top of that, $183 in cash also went missing, and its location could not be accounted for, resulting in a net loss of $75.78, though Protégé would have still lost the task (with a profit of just $107.22) even if the missing cash had been found.
  - Sent to boardroom: Kristi, Heidi, and Omarosa
- Fired: Kristi Frank – for having questionable leadership qualities, along with the severe failure of her "divide and conquer" plan, bringing Heidi back instead of Jessie and for not making any case as to why she should be allowed to stay.
- Notes:
  - Episode recap from NBC.com
  - Protégé's first loss ends Versacorp's 4-week losing streak.
  - Donald Trump warns the new teams sex appeal will not cut it in the real world in reorganizing the teams, following up the discussion he had with all-female Protégé in Week 4.
  - This episode marks the first time that female candidates were in the final boardroom. Kristi chooses to bring Heidi and Omarosa into the final boardroom, where Kristi becomes the first woman fired on The Apprentice.
  - Shortly after the final boardroom began, Trump jokingly implied that he was about to fire Omarosa, who Kristi had blamed for losing the $183. Despite criticizing Heidi for her negativity in the task, Trump also indicated that Kristi should have brought back Jessie instead, as she was behind a lot of the ideas which resulted in the team's high expenditure.
  - George Ross does not appear in this episode because of a business trip. He is replaced (temporarily) by Bernie Diamond.

=== Week 6: "Tit for Tat" ===
- Air date: February 12, 2004
- Task: This week's task is to raise money for charity at a Sotheby's celebrity auction. The teams are told to sign up celebrities for an auction to benefit the Elizabeth Glaser Pediatric AIDS Foundation. The celebrities that took part in the auction were Regis Philbin, Rocco DiSpirito, Carson Daly, Tiki Barber, Ed Bernero (an Executive Producer of Third Watch), Russell Simmons, Kate White (the editor of Cosmopolitan magazine), Nicole Miller, the cast of Queer Eye for the Straight Guy and Isaac Mizrahi.
- Judges: Donald Trump; Carolyn Kepcher; George H. Ross
- Monologue: – Know What You're Up Against – In order to compete you must be aware of your competition.
- Protégé project manager: Omarosa
- Versacorp project manager: Bill
- Winning team: Versacorp
  - Reasons for win: The team raised $40,000 which included strong returns from packages involving Daly and DiSpirito. Also, Versacorp won because they were able to minimize the numerous gaffes that Tammy made throughout the task.
  - Reward: None – as this was a charity event, Trump decided that the feeling of raising money for a charity was reward enough.
- Losing team: Protégé
  - Reasons for loss: Protégé did well on balance but did not have the bigger-money items that Versacorp did, losing with a final total of $35,000.
  - Sent to boardroom: Omarosa, Heidi, and Jessie
- Fired: Jessie Connors – for being the weakest negotiator on the team and for not defending herself after being harshly criticized by Omarosa.
- Notes:
  - Episode recap from NBC.com
  - A show-mance began between Nick and Amy.
  - Omarosa harshly criticized both Heidi and Jessie, stating she had not found Heidi to be professional or have much class before this event (where she did praise Heidi's performance), and calling Jessie an "airhead" and a "bystander." Donald Trump was disgusted with Omarosa's comments, but seemed just as angry that Heidi and Jessie initially said they liked Omarosa after being so strongly insulted, which he found hard to believe. When the trio returned for the final boardroom, Omarosa made even more harsh criticisms of the other two, this time offending Heidi and spurring her into a rather angry self-defense. Jessie on the other hand still refused to say anything bad about Omarosa, which Trump felt showed a fatal lack of strength on her part. Trump told Heidi that she was tougher than Jessie.
  - For the second week in a row, Omarosa, Heidi and the woman who would be fired are brought into the final boardroom.

=== Week 7: "Dupe-lex" ===
- Air date: February 19, 2004
- Task: The teams restore and rent out apartments.
- Judges: Donald Trump; Carolyn Kepcher; Bernie Diamond
- Trump Monologue God Is In The Details – Trump believes that customers look at the detail a small flaw such as selling an unwashed used car can cost you a loss for $200 whereas it would only cost $10 to get it washed.
- Protégé project manager: Troy
- Versacorp project manager: Katrina
- Winning team: Protégé
  - Reasons for win: Protégé Corporation finally won after leasing their apartment with a 27% rent increase.
  - Tension: After the task result was announced, Katrina criticised Troy, accusing him of being out of control and having an unethical personality. After Trump revealed that Troy successfully duped Katrina, the other members of Versacorp agreed with Katrina, but Tammy dissented by saying: "I think we got duped, to be honest." Trump and the others initially assumed this to be a humorous off-the-cuff remark, but in the initial boardroom Tammy said that she meant what she said which caused outrage among her teammates, especially Katrina and Ereka, and accused Katrina of being a poor negotiator and unable to handle herself in the business world.
  - Reward: A trip to Donald Trump's mansion in Bedford for a picnic.
- Losing team: Versacorp
  - Reasons for loss: Versacorp only gained 10% in the rent. Katrina decided having Bill doing the negotiations of the price in the apartment, but he did not negotiate a better or higher price of the apartment.
  - Sent to boardroom: Katrina, Bill, and Tammy
  - Initial boardroom: Trump was unimpressed with the lousy efforts Tammy, Katrina, & Bill performed throughout the entire task. While Trump strongly called out Bill for being a lousy negotiator on not negotiating the better price, he ultimately decided he could not hold Bill responsible for the loss given that Katrina only brought in one potential customer. Trump felt that without a doubt Katrina was the most to blame for the team's failure, for her shoddy leadership and numerous questionable decisions throughout the task. However, he also felt that she had demonstrated potential on the previous tasks, and that Tammy's disloyal remarks and far weaker history than the other two outweighed Katrina's mistakes, leading to Tammy's firing.
- Fired: Tammy Lee – for her having been generally ineffectual throughout the season, never living up to the early promise shown by her outstanding work on the second task, and for showing her disloyalty by claiming "We've been duped."
- Notes:
  - Ereka, Katrina and Tammy were on the losing team for the first time, breaking their six-week winning streak. It was also the second time the candidates were fired after its winning streak. This also means that Amy is now the only candidate who has won every task to date.
  - Heidi finds out her mother has colon cancer. Trump says she can leave the game to be with her mom if she wants, but she says she wants to stay and compete.
  - Amy, who was originally reshuffled onto Versacorp, is selected to come back to Protégé Corporation because of the initial 6 vs. 4 deficit.
  - Troy and Kwame are finally on a winning team.
  - George Ross was absent for unexplained reasons, and Bernie Diamond filled in for the second time this season.
  - Omarosa accidentally got hit in her head after the task began from the construction building. She initially shrugged this off, though as the task went on she began to complain about nausea and headaches, and would continue to complain about her "injury" in the tasks that followed.

=== Week 8: "Ice Escapades" ===
- Air date: February 26, 2004
- Task: Both teams sell bottled water called "Trump Ice" with Donald Trump's photo on each bottle.
- Judges: Donald Trump; Carolyn Kepcher; George H. Ross
- Trump Monologue Beggars Can't Be Choosers – Never beg in front of a customer, you have to sell a product to an interested customer, begging a customer to buy something will not get you a good deal.
- Protégé project manager: Heidi
- Versacorp project manager: Ereka
- Winning team: Protégé
  - Reasons for win: They sold over $6,000 worth of water. Troy devised a plan where the Trump Ice could be purchased in bunches over a period of several weeks, thus allowing businesses with limited storage space to not be swamped with too much product, thus securing large sales.
  - Reward: A helicopter tour of New York City in Mr. Trump's private chopper.
- Losing team: Versacorp
  - Reasons for loss: Nick did poorly as a salesperson, claiming that he would be a superstar at selling the water, then delivering poor results. Also, Ereka's leadership was sorely lacking giving little direction and strategy. They only sold over $4,000 worth of water, $2,000 less than Protégé.
  - Sent to boardroom: Ereka, Bill, and Nick
- Fired: Ereka Vetrini – for letting her emotions influence her decision-making, bringing Bill back instead of Katrina and for not having a strong defence when Nick and Bill jointly listed her deficiencies as a leader. While Trump was deeply disappointed with Nick, he felt Ereka's weak leadership was arguably the main reason they failed.
- Notes:
  - Episode recap from NBC.com
  - 20.0 million people watched this episode's initial airing. Despite the big numbers, the instalment came in at No. 11 on the weekly charts.
  - Ereka made the fatal mistake of letting her friend, Katrina, go back up to the suite and fight in the boardroom against Nick, incorrectly believing that Bill would support her in this decision. While George wanted to dismiss Ereka, Carolyn preferred to fire Nick. Ereka also lost her temper during the argument against Bill and Nick, which did not help her case against getting fired.
  - This is the first task of the season (and the series) where both project managers were of the same sex.
  - In Ereka's exit interview she called Bill a chicken for defending Nick.

=== Week 9: "DNA, Heads and the Undead Kitty" ===
- Air date: March 4, 2004
- Task: This week's task is to pick one artist from an array of controversial and strange painters, sculptors, and other kinds of artists. Then they must sell this art in a showing at a gallery. Protégé picks a surrealist artist named Meghan Boody, while Versacorp sticks with a more mainstream artist named Andrei Petrov, who specializes in abstract paintings.
- Judges: Donald Trump; Carolyn Kepcher; George H. Ross
- Trump Monologue: You've Gotta Believe – A seller has to have faith in what is being sold.
- Protégé project manager: Kwame
- Versacorp project manager: Nick
- Task tension: On Protege, Heidi butted heads with Omarosa when Omarosa said she was hungry and then demanded they have a sit-down lunch, while Heidi wanted to get take-out sandwiches and eat the food while they were working. Omarosa once again claimed her head was badly injured, and Heidi lost her patience and used expletives while screaming how sick she was of dealing with Omarosa.
- Winning team: Versacorp
  - Reasons for win: Versacorp sold 8 pieces for $13,600, blowing Protégé out of the water. Nick made an executive decision for his deadlocked team to go with an artist whose work was a smash hit at the gallery.
  - Rewards: Nick is awarded with 10 minutes alone with Mr. Trump, talking about the tricks of the trade. Trump told Nick that "even when you weren't, in theory, doing well, I thought you were doing well."
- Losing team: Protégé; they had only sold one piece with only $869 in sales.
  - Reasons for loss: Protégé chose an artist with a bizarre body of work that the gallery patrons did not like. Members of Protégé did not even like the artwork themselves, and were therefore unable to sell any of their pieces with conviction. They also apparently were unable to connect with Meghan's fanbase and get them to come to the show and buy her art.
  - Sent to boardroom: Kwame, Heidi, and Omarosa
- Fired: Omarosa Stallworth - for making too many excuses for herself, being difficult to work with, inability to take responsibility for her failures, and not delivering on her promises. While this was the second time Kwame had led his team to a crushing defeat, and Trump noted that Heidi was driving people "a little nuts", Trump considered Omarosa too much of a loose cannon to be given any more chances.
- Notes:
  - Episode recap from NBC.com
  - Omarosa breaks down after a highly emotional boardroom because of her alleged "concussion".
  - Nick chooses Amy to come to his side, Versacorp, for this task. Trump half-jokingly says that with Amy always being chosen to join new teams so often, maybe he should hire her right away.
  - Midway through Trump's discussion with Carolyn and George, Omarosa walks in and complains. This marks the first time a candidate has interrupted Trump and his viceroys midway through a discussion. When she heads out to dry her teary eyes, Heidi remains at the table and makes a sarcastic expression that leads to a sardonic grin from Trump.
  - This was the fifth consecutive week that a woman was fired, and the number of men remaining is now greater than the women.

=== Week 10: "Wheeling and Dealing" ===
- Air date: March 11, 2004
- Task: The teams take over a pedicab shift. Protégé Corporation sells prepaid punch cards, modeled after Troy's phased-sales plan that was the winner on the Trump Ice task. Versacorp sells advertising on the rickshaws that they ride. Amy uses previous contacts made in the game to quickly amass a large amount of advertising commitments. Kwame spends much of the afternoon as a driver but without being able to land a single fare. After one of the ads (for a restaurant) is found to have fallen off one of Versacorp's pedicabs, Nick irritated his teammates by going back to the restaurant owner and returning the full amount paid. When Troy sees Versacorp's pedicab advertising, he realizes Protégé is sunk and in a rare moment of humility states, "It was a great idea. I didn't come up with it." With Protégé's victory disappearing into thin air, Heidi begins swearing under her breath at passersby when she is unable to convince them to buy rides.
- Judges: Donald Trump; Carolyn Kepcher; George H. Ross
- Trump Monologue Think OutSide The Box – Do not stick with the tried and tested and make room for creativity and innovation.
- Protégé project manager: Troy
- Versacorp project manager: Bill
- Winning team: Versacorp
  - Reasons for win: Amy had the bold idea of selling ads to put on their Pedicabs (inspired by NASCAR) and as a result raised $3,680.
  - Rewards: A ride around Manhattan on a yacht named Calypso.
- Losing team: Protégé
  - Reasons for loss: Protégé's sales ideas could not match the ad revenue Versacorp brought in. They only got $382.68 in sales.
  - Sent to boardroom: Troy and Heidi
- Fired: Heidi Bressler – Trump personally liked her (something Kwame noted before the Boardroom and Trump said himself post-firing) but felt she hadn't stepped up as a leader and was not contributing enough as a follower. Carolyn called out Heidi for under-performing, later interviewing that she was trying to get Heidi to defend herself.
- Notes:
  - Episode recap from NBC.com
  - There are ethical battles and morale-boosting schemes.
  - A new rule is imposed in this episode: when a team is down to 3 members, the Project Manager sends 1 person up to the suite, and goes into the final boardroom with the other.
  - One of Versacorp's ads was Marquis Jets, which both teams worked with in episode 2.

=== Week 11: "A Look Back" ===
- Air date: March 18, 2004
- Notes:
- Recap of first ten weeks, along with previously unaired footage.
- Among other new scenes: the men respond to their first two losses by having an amusing awkward visit to a spa that includes Troy painfully getting a leg waxing; Omarosa and Ereka's week two reward argument includes Omarosa's insinuation (later proven false) that Ereka made racist comments; Sam amuses the guys when he calls his dad for a pep talk after his week three PM loss and does not get any specifically useful information; and Nick and Bill have dinner the night before the week eight Boardroom where they agree to back each other up if Ereka targets either of them instead of Katrina to be fired by Trump.
- No new task, no firing.
- This episode was added because NBC did not want the show to compete against CBS' coverage of the NCAA Men's Division I Basketball Championship first-round games, knowing how the ratings of the tournament, would be too hard to compete against because of the heavily regionalised coverage of the tournament. Likewise, Mark Burnett Productions refuses to let The Apprentice compete head-to-head against CBS' Survivor, which is also a Mark Burnett production.
- One particularly humorous outtake was the one featuring Omarosa calling in the doctor to get advice on her "terrible head injury". When the doctor said it was nothing serious, she was not satisfied, and proceeded to check into the hospital.

=== Week 12: "Circus, Circus" ===
- Air date: March 25, 2004
- "Corporate Reshuffle": Protégé Corporation is down to two candidates against four on Versacorp. As in the past when the teams have become overly uneven, Trump has the smaller team choose a player from the winning team. Kwame and Troy select Bill, breaking with the "tradition" of picking Amy, as Troy said she had already received enough kudos. Versacorp now consists of Amy, Katrina and Nick.
- Task: The teams head to Atlantic City, New Jersey where they will be responsible for registering gamblers at the Trump Taj Mahal Resort and Casino, and coming up with a promotion to incentivise them to stay at the casino to maximise the money they spent. The team whose registered gamblers wager the most money wins. Protégé's priority was to get the people to gamble as much as possible, rather than to attract as many gamblers as possible. In a bid to get people to stay, Protégé decided to raffle off $1,000 cash late in the evening. Versacorp also raffled off a prize at the end of the night where the lucky winner could either have a drive in an expensive sports car or collect $300; this prize however was far less effective of making the people stay. Protégé then decided to send in a caged tiger where the people gambling for Versacorp were to distract them from gambling. At the end of the night, Protégé attracted significantly fewer gamblers than Versacorp (776 vs 1,337), but crucially those gamblers of Protégé wagered on average double the amount of their rivals ($159 vs $79 per person).
- Judges: Donald Trump; Carolyn Kepcher; Mark Brown
- Trump Monologue It's Easier To Think Big – A personal reflection of Trump on how it has been always practical for Trump to take the next step.
- Protégé project manager: Kwame
- Versacorp project manager: Amy
- Winning team: Protégé
  - Reasons for win: Protégé is able to earn $123,159, thanks to Bill's plan to target high rollers (VIPs).
  - Reward: Protégé stayed overnight at the best suite in The Trump Taj Mahal with $3000 in gambling money.
- Losing team: Versacorp
  - Reasons for loss: At the end of the task, Versacorp takes in $105,362. At some point, Amy did something that took people off the floor and hurt Versacorp's numbers, but no specifics were given.
- Sent to boardroom: Amy and Katrina
- Fired: Katrina Campins – for a lack of contributions to the task and in the process overall by comparison to the other members of the team. This was the first task where Amy lost, and despite both her and Katrina making a significant number of mistakes between them during this task, Trump ultimately decided that he could not fire Amy given her past successes.
- Notes:
  - Episode recap from NBC.com
  - This is the first time Amy has been on a losing team, breaking her ten-week streak. She currently holds the record for longest time ever without losing a challenge.
  - Bill is not happy to be chosen by Kwame to join Protégé, saying that he is not a fan of Troy and does not respect the way he does business. In the Season 1 DVD, Bill refers to his new teammates as "Dumb and Dumber". The DVD extra includes a music video.
  - George Ross does not appear in this episode. Mark Brown replaces him while he is away.
  - Katrina tried to use her sexuality to convince the Chrysler executive into letting them auction off the Chrysler Crossfire.
  - 22.8 million people watched this episode's initial airing, rebounding from last week and building upon the recap episode by five million viewers, pushing it far enough to take second place for the week.
  - This week's winning team configuration (Bill, Kwame, Troy) is the only one to both win a task and lose a task. Every prior winning team configuration won multiple tasks until being modified by a corporate reshuffle, and the following task's winning team configuration (Nick, Amy) only competed once in that form due to the end of the team tasks.

=== Week 13: "The Price is Height" ===
- Air date: April 1, 2004
- Task: This week's task is to rent out a luxurious penthouse for one evening at Trump World Tower for no less than $20,000 for one night.
- Judges: Donald Trump; Carolyn Kepcher; Bernie Diamond
- Protégé project manager: Troy
- Versacorp project manager: Nick
- Trump Monologue Passion – If you don't have passion for what you're doing, you won't be successful.
- Winning team: Versacorp
  - Reasons for win: Versacorp took in $40,800 for the win, thanks to a deal at the very last minute.
  - Reward: A flight and lunch to Trump's Mar-a-Lago private club in Palm Beach, Florida. Amy's sister and Nick's father surprised them on the plane.
- Losing team: Protégé
  - Reasons for loss: Protégé took in $35,001. Troy's sales style annoyed one prospective customer who walked away from the penthouse.
  - Sent to boardroom: Troy and Kwame
  - Firing verdict: During the boardroom, Bill, Kwame, and Troy were asked about their education. Troy only held a high school diploma, while Kwame held a Master's degree from Harvard, and Bill has a college degree from Loyola University, both schools Trump knew well. Troy would fire Kwame, so Bill was not nominated for the final Boardroom. Troy and Kwame would face the final wrath of Trump after Trump took time to review the performance of the Boardroom Nominees.
- Fired: Troy McClain – for sometimes using unethical business practices throughout the duration of the interview process, horrible Project Manager Record of 1–3, and partly due to lacking the education of the other two contestants. Although Kwame was spared, and this was Troy's third failure as project manager, Trump actually felt Troy was more of a leader than Kwame, but it was Kwame's education that spared him from getting the axe.
- Notes:
  - Episode recap from NBC.com
  - 20.2 million people watched this episode's initial airing, just edging into the top five for the week.
  - This was the first time in eight weeks that a man was fired.
  - George Ross was away on a business trip, and was filled in for by Bernie Diamond once again. This was Bernie's third and final appearance as a boardroom judge, though he continued to make occasional cameo appearances (mostly in the "Trump's Lesson" montages) throughout the following seasons.
  - After their loss, the men of Protege went out to dinner and "ordered like kings", having a nice and ultimately respectful evening in which they got along better than they previously had. Kwame tells them that the competition will be won by one of them, which ends up being true.

=== Week 14: "Down to The Wire" ===
==== Semifinal ====
- Air date: April 8
- Task: Face an interview with four of Trump's executives. Two people will be fired.
- Fired:
  - Nick Warnock – for not gaining the respect of his peers and for lacking leadership, despite an impeccable record as project manager (3–0) and being a respected sales representative. In addition to a general agreement among the executives, all three remaining candidates unanimously recommended that Trump should fire him.
  - Amy Henry – for not earning the respect of Trump's executives. Although she had a near perfect team record (losing only one of the twelve tasks), the executives did not like her whatsoever, and one of them even remarked that "she reminded me of a stepford wife".

==== Final ====
- Trump Monologue Dog Does Not Eat Dog – Surround yourself with those loyal to you. Don't give the disloyal a second chance.
- Finalists: Bill Rancic and Kwame Jackson
- Teams:
  - Protégé: Kwame, Heidi, Omarosa, and Troy
  - Versacorp: Bill, Amy, Katrina, and Nick
- Tasks:
  - Protégé: Manage a Jessica Simpson concert at the Trump Taj Mahal in Atlantic City, New Jersey
  - Versacorp: Manage a golf tournament at Trump National Golf Club Westchester in Briarcliff Manor, New York
- Judges: Donald Trump; Carolyn Kepcher; George H. Ross
- Notes:
  - Amy's firing marks the end of the original team Protégé, as both finalists are from the same team (Versacorp).
  - Bill Rancic was only 5–7 (with a 2–0 Project Manager Record) and Kwame Jackson was 3–9 (1–2 as Project Manager) in the 13 weeks. It is the only time in Apprentice history where the final two each had a losing record in all of the episodes throughout the season, because of all of the switching of members of teams (plus the men's four-week losing streak at the start of the season).
  - Omarosa does not fulfill her duties, and Jessica Simpson ends up being lost. Kwame's uncertainty about how to deal with her led to confusion about whether he could have fired her. During the season-three finale, George Ross clarified this point, saying that the project managers could use their employees in any way they wanted, a situation where Kwame would have been free to fire Omarosa from the task.
  - A mix-up involving a coin flip for which final tasks Bill and Kwame would take (which Bill won) led to Bill also having the #1 overall pick from the group of six fired contestants who returned to be tasked to a finalist's mission. Kwame selected Omarosa as his 2nd team member (after Troy) because Bill had already drafted Amy and Katrina and made it clear he would NOT have Omarosa on his team. Kwame also did not want Nick on his team—and knew that Bill would draft his friend and former teammate Nick with his last choice anyway—and chose Omarosa instead of Heidi because he felt Heidi would work hard as the last person standing and Omarosa was unlikely to do that if she was angry.
  - Episode recap from NBC.com

=== Week 15: "Season Finale" ===
- Air Date: April 15
- Jessica Simpson booked her own transportation, without informing Kwame, and arrived at the hotel safely with her band. At the golf tournament, Bill lost track of some of the inventory.
- Omarosa broke orders and took Jessica Simpson away when she was supposed to meet with Donald Trump. Trump gets impatient as Kwame is unable to locate Ms. Simpson.
- Omarosa continues to make attacks concerning Kwame's handling of the Jessica Simpson concert.
- Bill had to scramble to recover an expensive poster set for the golf tournament, but was able to find the items near a dumpster as they'd mistakenly been identified as trash to be thrown out. Bill also clashed with Leslie, an overseeing club manager who criticized his and Katria's decisions regarding storage of items; Bill said to the camera "what Leslie says is irrelevant" and ignored her for the rest of the task.
- Both tasks are successful. Trump introduced Simpson at her concert, and donated $25,000 to Operation Smile, an organization which Simpson sponsors.
- Trump's comments: Trump was aghast when he found out that Kwame did not fire Omarosa for excessive false testimony and felt that his explanations for not dismissing her were unsatisfactory.
- Fired: Kwame Jackson – for his inability to control Omarosa and her insubordination on several occasions throughout the concert.
- Hired: Bill Rancic – because Trump thought Bill did a very good job and Carolyn had nothing but positive comments about him. He gets to choose from two jobs, and has only three minutes to decide. He selects the project of overseeing the building of Trump International Hotel and Tower in Chicago, Illinois, on the site of the present Chicago Sun-Times Building. The other option he had was to oversee and manage a new Trump National Golf Course and resort in Los Angeles.
- Part of this episode is taped at the same time as the Newlyweds: Nick and Jessica' second season premiere. Only footage with Donald Trump introducing Jessica at the concert is seen, as footage featuring Kwame and his team had to be removed so there would be no spoilers prior to the airing of The Apprentice.
- Kwame said during the task he would have fired Omarosa from the task for her incompetence but didn't think he had the option of doing so, and did not simply sideline her because he would have overstretched himself, Troy and Heidi with the many tasks involved in his event. In season three, George Ross issued a long-sought clarification that the final two contestants were free to handle their teams any way they saw fit, including firing them or giving them nothing to do if necessary.

== Episodes ==
| No. overall | No. in season | Title | Original release date |
|---|---|---|---|
| 1 | 1 | "Meet the Billionaire" | January 8, 2004 |
| 2 | 2 | "Sex, Lies and Altitude" | January 15, 2004 |
| 3 | 3 | "Respect" | January 22, 2004 |
| 4 | 4 | "Ethics Schmethics" | January 29, 2004 |
| 5 | 5 | "Trading Places" | February 5, 2004 |
| 6 | 6 | "Tit for Tat" | February 12, 2004 |
| 7 | 7 | "Dupe-lex" | February 19, 2004 |
| 8 | 8 | "Ice Escapades" | February 26, 2004 |
| 9 | 9 | "DNA, Heads and the Undead Kitty" | March 4, 2004 |
| 10 | 10 | "Wheeling and Dealing" | March 11, 2004 |
| 11 | 11 | "A Look Back" | March 18, 2004 |
| 12 | 12 | "Circus, Circus" | March 25, 2004 |
| 13 | 13 | "The Price is Height" | April 1, 2004 |
| 14 | 14 | "Down to the Wire" | April 8, 2004 |
| 15 | 15 | "Season Finale" | April 15, 2004 |
