= Trump Ice =

Bottled water brand

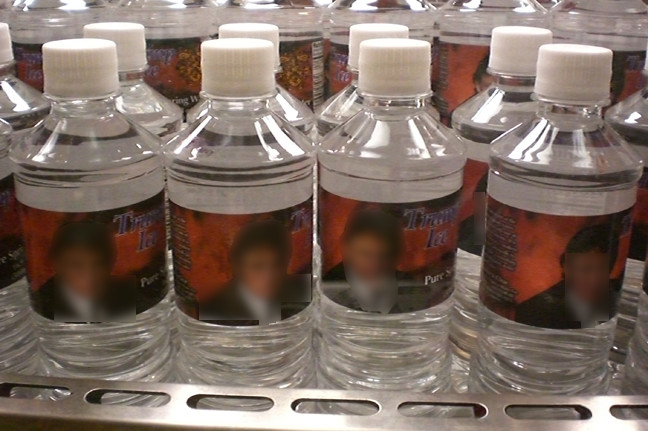
- Bottles of Trump Ice in Trump Tower
- Type: Bottled water
- Distributor: Mountain Spring Waters of America
- Origin: United States
- Introduced: c. 1995
- Discontinued: 2010

Trump Ice or Trump Natural Spring Water was a bottled water brand owned by American businessman Donald Trump.

== History ==
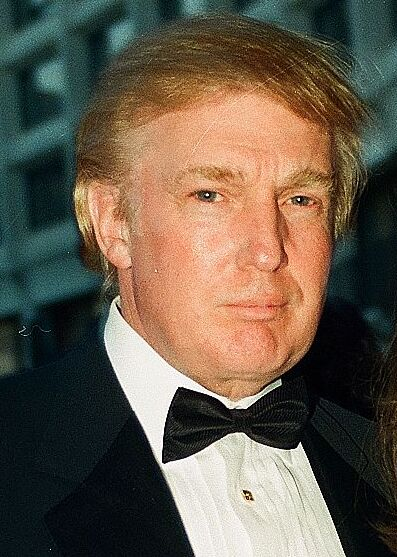
Donald Trump in 1999

Trump Ice was initially sold only at Trump-owned casinos and other select markets. In around 2003, its distribution branched out to other national grocery chains and specialty food stores through the United States.

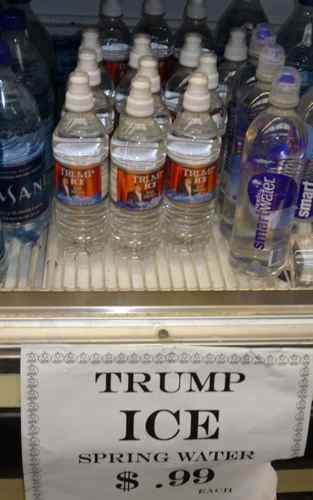
Trump Ice on store shelves in 2009

Trump Ice was distributed by Mountain Spring Waters of America in the New York and New Jersey area. The goal of the distributor was to strategically develop the brand in the consumers' market, from 12-ounce (340 g) bottles to 5-US-gallon (19 L; 4.2 imp gal) Trump Ice tanks, to make it comparable with other notable water brands. Kelly Perdew, the winner of The Apprentice 2, was privately appointed as executive vice president of Trump Ice as part of his contractual extension with The Trump Organization. According to AOL, Trump personally invested $498,000 in Trump Ice.

The brand was discontinued in 2010, but "Trump Natural Spring Water" is still listed as exclusively available at Trump-branded hotels, restaurants and golf clubs on Trump's website. According to Trump's 2016 Financial Disclosure Form, which was filed with the Federal Election Commission, the available cash from the Trump Natural Spring Water's bank account reached $413,339 in 2015.

Trump Ice was featured in the first season of The Apprentice when the competitors had to try to solicit and to sell the water.

In October 2015, leading up to the 2016 Republican presidential primaries, Trump had some Trump Ice delivered to rival Marco Rubio, whom he had lambasted for "being sweaty" and having "awkwardly reached for a bottle of water" during Rubio's 2013 State of the Union rebuttal; along with the bottled water was other Trump merchandise, and a note reading, "Since you're always sweating, we thought you could use some water. Enjoy!".

== Production ==
New York described the bottle's original label as "fiery".

Marketed as "one of the purest natural spring waters bottled in the world", Trump claimed in a brief interview with New York magazine that there is zero sodium in Trump Ice. The water is derived from Vermont and bottled in New York. The bottle design, described by a New York writer as "fiery", features Trump's face against an initially red and subsequently blue background.

== Reception ==
An Entertainment Weekly columnist repudiated the brand's claim that Trump Ice is "one of the highest quality spring waters in the world with an optimum mineral content" by pointing out its "very low" mineral content, plus the fact that it is bottled in plastic, as opposed to glass. A CNN review of Trump products argued that Trump Ice "is clearly not about the water but rather a vehicle for the Trump image".

In a 2007 Access Hollywood interview, Sylvester Stallone, who had also launched his own bottled water line called Sly Water, was asked to take a blind taste test of two types of water: his and that of a competitor. When asked which one he preferred after tasting both, Stallone correctly identified his own water, and added he would not wash his socks using the other water. When told that the other water was Trump Ice, Stallone laughed and apologized to Donald Trump, before quipping that Rocky VII would be a showdown between his and Trump's brands of water.

== See also ==
- List of things named after Donald Trump
- Trump Vodka
