= We Mean Business (TV series) =

- Genre: Reality
- Starring: Bill Rancic; Katie Linendoll; Peter Gurski
- Theme music composer: Erik Aho
- Country of origin: United States
- Original language: English
- No. of seasons: 1
- No. of episodes: 8

Original release
- Network: A&E
- Release: September 6 – October 25, 2008

We Mean Business is an American reality television series that aired on the A&E cable network starting on September 6, 2008. The program featured three regular experts: "Business Expert" Bill Rancic, a former contestant on The Apprentice; "Tech Expert" Katie Linendoll; and "Design Expert" Peter Gurski. In each episode, the three experts helped a struggling small business owner turn their business around by improving business practices and enhancing the marketing of the business. Notably, the program was sponsored by Dell, which provided all of the new technical equipment given to the businesses.
