= Jim Turnesa =

American professional golfer (1912–1971)

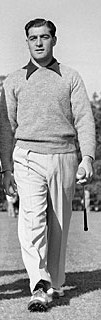
- Turnesa in 1936

Personal information
- Full name: James R. Turnesa
- Nationality: United States
- Born: December 9, 1912 New York, New York, U.S.
- Died: August 27, 1971 (aged 58) Elmsford, New York, U.S.

Career
- Sport: Golf
- Turned professional: 1931
- Former tour: PGA Tour
- Professional wins: 11

Number of wins by tour
- PGA Tour: 2
- Other: 9

Best results in major championships (wins: 1)
- Masters Tournament: T4: 1949
- PGA Championship: Won: 1952
- U.S. Open: 3rd: 1948
- The Open Championship: T5: 1954

James R. Turnesa (December 9, 1912 – August 27, 1971) was an American professional golfer and winner of the 1952 PGA Championship, beating Chick Harbert 1-up in the match-play final.

== Early life ==
Turnesa was born in Elmsford, New York, one of seven brothers who became prominent in the golfing world: Phil (1896–1987), Frank (1898–1949), Joe (1901–1991), Mike (1907–2000), Doug (1909–1972), Jim (1912–1971), and Willie (1914–2001). The family was referred to as a "golf dynasty" in a 2000 New York Times article. All but Willie turned professional and Jim was the only one to win a major championship.

The Turnesa brothers were well known for their prowess on the links and they started out as caddies before competing in tournaments. Jim's father Vitale was a head greenskeeper at Fairview Country Club. It was at Fairview that Jim and his brothers would apprentice under the head pro John R. Inglis. So famous did they become as a dynasty of the sport that RKO Pictures filmed a newsreel about them in 1938 labeling the clip "The Golfing Brothers."

== Professional career ==
Turnesa faced and lost to Sam Snead in the 1942 PGA Championship final. In 1948, he held the record for low score (280) in the U.S. Open for about an hour. Ben Hogan (276) and Jimmy Demaret (278) finished later, erasing his record, and he finished third. He won one other PGA Tour event, the 1951 Reading Open.

He was a frequent participant in Westchester member-pro events beating out a duo that included Gene Sarazen in 1947 at a Knollwood Country Club best ball tournament.

Turnesa played on the 1953 Ryder Cup team.

After serving as pro at Briar Hall and Empire State course, he was named the head pro at Ryewood Country Club in 1959 and continued there in the early 1960s.

== Death ==
He died in his home town of lung cancer.

== Professional wins (11) ==
=== PGA Tour wins (2) ===
- 1951 Reading Open
- 1952 **PGA Championship**

Major championship is shown in bold.

=== Other wins (9) ===
Note: This list may be incomplete.

- 1937 Rhode Island Open
- 1946 Westchester PGA Championship
- 1947 North and South Open
- 1950 Havana Invitational
- 1956 Westchester PGA Championship
- 1959 Metropolitan Open
- 1960 Haig & Haig Scotch Foursome (with Gloria Armstrong)
- 1964 Westchester PGA Championship
- 1968 Long Island PGA Championship

== Major championships ==
=== Wins (1) ===
Year	Championship	Winning score	Runner-up
1952	PGA Championship	1 up	(United States) Chick Harbert

Note: The PGA Championship was match play until 1958

=== Results timeline ===
Tournament	1937	1938	1939
Masters Tournament			
U.S. Open	T50	CUT	T32
The Open Championship			
PGA Championship			

Tournament	1940	1941	1942	1943	1944	1945	1946	1947	1948	1949
Masters Tournament				NT	NT	NT	T37	T44		T4
U.S. Open	CUT	T33	NT	NT	NT	NT		T39	3	T4
The Open Championship	NT	NT	NT	NT	NT	NT				
PGA Championship			2	NT		R16	QF	R16	R64	R16

Tournament	1950	1951	1952	1953	1954	1955	1956	1957	1958	1959
Masters Tournament	T46			T27	T60	48	T22	CUT	T35	CUT
U.S. Open	T38			T17	T33			CUT	CUT	
The Open Championship					T5					
PGA Championship		R32	**1**	R32	R64		R16	R128	CUT	T38

Tournament	1960	1961	1962	1963	1964	1965	1966	1967	1968	1969
Masters Tournament	T39	CUT	CUT							
U.S. Open	T46	CUT			CUT					
The Open Championship										
PGA Championship	T32	CUT	CUT	CUT	T62	CUT	CUT		CUT	T76

Win
Top 10
Did not play

NT = no tournament
CUT = missed the half-way cut
R128, R64, R32, R16, QF, SF = round in which player lost in PGA Championship match play
"T" indicates a tie for a place

=== Summary ===
Tournament	Wins	2nd	3rd	Top-5	Top-10	Top-25	Events	Cuts made
Masters Tournament	0	0	0	1	1	2	14	10
U.S. Open	0	0	1	2	2	3	16	10
The Open Championship	0	0	0	1	1	1	1	1
PGA Championship	1	1	0	3	7	9	23	16
Totals	1	1	1	7	11	15	54	37

- Most consecutive cuts made – 27 (1941 U.S. Open – 1956 PGA)
- Longest streak of top-10s – 3 (1949 Masters – 1949 PGA)

== U.S. national team appearances ==
Professional

- Ryder Cup: 1953 (winners)
- Canada Cup: 1953
- Lakes International Cup: 1952 (winners)
- Hopkins Trophy: 1953 (winners)

== See also ==
- List of men's major championships winning golfers
