= 1952 PGA Championship =

Coordinates: 38.232°N 85.648°W

Tournament information
- Dates: June 18–25, 1952
- Location: Louisville, Kentucky, U.S.
- Course: Big Spring Country Club
- Organized by: PGA of America
- Tour: PGA Tour
- Format: Match play – 6 rounds

Statistics
- Par: 72
- Length: 6,620 yards (6,053 m)
- Field: 144 players, 64 to match play
- Cut: 147 (+3), playoff
- Prize fund: $17,700
- Winner's share: $3,500

Champion
- (United States) Jim Turnesa
- def. Chick Harbert, 1 up

Location in the United States
Location in Kentucky

The 1952 PGA Championship was the 34th PGA Championship, held June 18–25 at Big Spring Country Club in Louisville, Kentucky. Jim Turnesa won the match play championship, 1 up over Chick Harbert in the Wednesday final; the winner's share was $3,500 and the runner-up's was $1,500.

It was Turnesa's only major title; he had lost the final in 1942 to Sam Snead. It was the second loss for Harbert in the final, he lost to Jim Ferrier in 1947, but won the title in his third finals appearance in 1954. Turnesa did not lead through the first 35 holes, but won on the final green when Harbert bogeyed. Turnesa displaced Snead as the oldest PGA champion to date, at 39 years and six months. He was later passed by Jerry Barber at 45 in 1961 and Julius Boros in 1968 at age 48.

Battling an ailing back, defending champion Snead lost in the first round to Lew Worsham, who had defeated him in a playoff five years earlier at the 1947 U.S. Open. Heavy rains washed out play on Saturday and the completion of the third round was delayed until Sunday, and very hot temperatures endured through the final rounds.

The U.S. Open was played the preceding week, in Dallas, Texas, won by Boros. He was not technically eligible to play in the PGA Championship, because the rules at the time stated that eligibility was after five years of PGA membership and Boros only had three. Following his win at the U.S. Open, Boros was invited to play by the PGA executive committee, but sensing resentment and dissension among some of the other participants, he withdrew prior to his start time of the two-day qualifier on Wednesday.

Dutch Harrison was the medalist in the stroke-play qualifying with a 136 (−8) to win $250, but lost in the first round to Marty Furgol.

Turnesa's older brother Joe (1901–1991) was the runner-up in this championship a quarter century earlier in 1927, when Walter Hagen won his fourth consecutive, 1 up, and fifth overall.

This was the first major championship played in Kentucky. The PGA Championship returned to the state 44 years later in 1996, at Valhalla Golf Club east of Louisville. Valhalla also hosted just four years later in 2000 and in 2014.

== Format ==
The match play format at the PGA Championship in 1952 called for 12 rounds (216 holes) in seven days:

- Wednesday and Thursday – 36-hole stroke play qualifier, 18 holes per day;
  - defending champion Sam Snead and top 63 professionals advanced to match play
- Friday – first two rounds, 18 holes each
- Saturday – third round – 36 holes (delayed to Sunday)
- Sunday – quarterfinals – 36 holes (delayed to Monday)
- Monday – semifinals – 36 holes (delayed to Tuesday)
- Tuesday – final – 36 holes (delayed to Wednesday)

Heavy rains on Saturday postponed the third round until Sunday; the final was played on Wednesday, June 25.

== Final results ==
Wednesday, June 25, 1952

Place	Player	Money ($)
1	(United States) Jim Turnesa	3,500
2	(United States) Chick Harbert	1,500
T3	(United States) Bob Hamilton	750
T3	(United States) Ted Kroll	750
T5	(United States) Frank Champ	500
T5	(United States) Clarence Doser	500
T5	(United States) Fred Haas	500
T5	(United States) Cary Middlecoff	500

== Final eight bracket ==
Quarter-finals; June 23
Jim Turnesa	2&1
Clarence Doser
Ted Kroll	38h
Cary Middlecoff
Chick Harbert	2&1
Fred Haas
Bob Hamilton	2&1
Frank Champ

Semi-finals; June 24
Jim Turnesa	4&2
Ted Kroll
Chick Harbert	2&1
Bob Hamilton

Finals; June 25
Jim Turnesa	1up
Chick Harbert

== Final match scorecards ==
Morning

Hole	1	2	3	4	5	6	7	8	9	10	11	12	13	14	15	16	17	18
Par	5	3	4	4	4	3	4	5	4	4	3	5	4	4	4	3	5	4
(United States) Turnesa	5	4	4	4	4	3	4	5	4	4	3	4	4	3	4	3	6	5
(United States) Harbert	4	4	5	4	3	3	5	4	3	5	3	4	4	4	4	2	5	4
Leader	H1	H1	–	–	H1	H1	–	H1	H2	H1	H1	H1	H1	–	–	H1	H2	H3

Afternoon

Hole	1	2	3	4	5	6	7	8	9	10	11	12	13	14	15	16	17	18
Par	5	3	4	4	4	3	4	5	4	4	3	5	4	4	4	3	5	4
(United States) Turnesa	4	3	4	4	4	2	4	4	4	4	3	5	4	3	3	4	5	4
(United States) Harbert	5	4	4	3	4	2	4	5	4	4	3	5	4	4	3	4	5	5
Leader	H2	H1	H1	H2	H2	H2	H2	H1	H1	H1	H1	H1	H1	–	–	–	–	T1

Birdie	Bogey
