= 2000 Open Championship =

Coordinates: 56.343°N 2.803°W

Tournament information
- Dates: 20–23 July 2000
- Location: St Andrews, Scotland
- Course: Old Course at St Andrews
- Tours: European Tour; PGA Tour; Japan Golf Tour

Statistics
- Par: 72
- Length: 7,115 yards (6,506 m)
- Field: 156 players, 74 after cut
- Cut: 144 (E)
- Prize fund: £2,800,000 €4,447,480 $4,175,325
- Winner's share: £500,000 €799,550 $759,150

Champion
- (United States) Tiger Woods
- 269 (−19)

Location in Scotland
Location in Fife, Scotland

The 2000 Open Championship was a men's major golf championship and the 129th Open Championship, held from 20 to 23 July at the Old Course in St Andrews, Scotland. Tiger Woods, 24, won his first Open Championship and fourth major title, eight strokes ahead of runners-up Thomas Bjørn and Ernie Els.

With the victory, Woods became the fifth golfer and also youngest ever to complete a career Grand Slam (winning the Open Championship, PGA Championship, Masters and U.S. Open in the course of a career), beating Jack Nicklaus' record by two years. He went on to complete the "Tiger Slam" – holding all four major championships simultaneously, as this Open Championship was preceded by the 2000 U.S. Open at Pebble Beach Golf Links and then followed by the 2000 PGA Championship at Valhalla Golf Club and the 2001 Masters at Augusta National Golf Club.

At this Open, Woods also achieved the lowest 72-hole score in relation to par at −19, which was a record for all major championships for fifteen years, until Jason Day broke it at the PGA Championship in 2015 at twenty-under-par.

Woods became the sixth to win the U.S. Open and the Open Championship in the same year, joining fellow Americans Bobby Jones (1926, 1930), Gene Sarazen (1932), Ben Hogan (1953), Lee Trevino (1971), and Tom Watson (1982). Woods also became the second player after Nicklaus to win both an Open Championship at St Andrews and a U.S. Open at Pebble Beach.

Defending champion Paul Lawrie shot 78-75 to miss the 36-hole cut by nine strokes.

It was the first Open Championship to be telecast in high-definition television in any country, being telecast in the United States by ABC Sports that year.

== Course ==
Hole	Name	Yards	Par	Hole	Name	Yards	Par
1	Burn	376	4	10	Bobby Jones	379	4
2	Dyke	413	4	11	High (In)	174	3
3	Cartgate (Out)	397	4	12	Heathery (In)	314	4
4	Ginger Beer	464	4	13	Hole O'Cross (In)	430	4
5	Hole O'Cross (Out)	568	5	14	Long	581	5
6	Heathery (Out)	412	4	15	Cartgate (In)	456	4
7	High (Out)	388	4	16	Corner of the Dyke	424	4
8	Short	175	3	17	Road	455	4
9	End	352	4	18	Tom Morris	357	4
Out		3,545	36	In		3,570	36
Source:				Total		7,115	72

Previous lengths of the course for The Open Championship (since 1950):

- 6,933 yards (6,340 m) - 1995, 1990, 1984, 1978
- 6,957 yards (6,361 m) - 1970
- 6,926 yards (6,333 m) - 1964, 1960, 1955

== Round summaries ==
=== First round ===
Thursday, 20 July 2000

Place	Player	Score	To par
1	(South Africa) Ernie Els	66	−6
T2	(United States) Steve Flesch	67	−5
T2	(United States) Tiger Woods	67	−5
T4	(United States) Scott Dunlap	68	−4
T4	(England) Ian Garbutt	68	−4
T4	(Spain) Sergio García	68	−4
T4	(Republic of Ireland) Pádraig Harrington	68	−4
T4	(United States) Tom Lehman	68	−4
T4	(Japan) Shigeki Maruyama	68	−4
T4	(United States) Dennis Paulson	68	−4

=== Second round ===
Friday, 21 July 2000

Place	Player	Score	To par
1	(United States) Tiger Woods	67-66=133	−11
2	(United States) David Toms	69-67=136	−8
T3	(United States) Steve Flesch	67-70=137	−7
T3	(Spain) Sergio García	68-69=137	−7
T3	(United States) Loren Roberts	69-68=137	−7
T6	(Denmark) Thomas Bjørn	69-69=138	−6
T6	(United States) Fred Couples	70-68=138	−6
T6	(South Africa) Ernie Els	66-72=138	−6
T6	(United States) Tom Lehman	68-70=138	−6
T6	(United States) Phil Mickelson	72-66=138	−6

Amateurs: Ilonen (+1), Donald (+4), Rowe (+4), Gossett (+5).

=== Third round ===
Saturday, 22 July 2000

Place	Player	Score	To par
1	(United States) Tiger Woods	67-66-67=200	−16
T2	(Denmark) Thomas Bjørn	69-69-68=206	−10
T2	(United States) David Duval	70-70-66=206	−10
T4	(Northern Ireland) Darren Clarke	70-69-68=207	-9
T4	(United States) Loren Roberts	69-68-70=207	-9
T4	(United States) David Toms	69-67-71=207	-9
T7	(South Africa) Ernie Els	66-72-70=208	−8
T7	(United States) Steve Flesch	67-70-71=208	−8
T7	(United States) Tom Lehman	68-70-70=208	−8
T7	(United States) Dennis Paulson	68-71-69=208	−8

=== Final round ===
Sunday, 23 July 2000

Place	Player	Score	To par	Money (£)
1	(United States) Tiger Woods	67-66-67-69=269	−19	500,000
T2	(Denmark) Thomas Bjørn	69-69-68-71=277	−11	245,000
T2	(South Africa) Ernie Els	66-72-70-69=277	−11	245,000
T4	(United States) Tom Lehman	68-70-70-70=278	−10	130,000
T4	(United States) David Toms	69-67-71-71=278	−10	130,000
6	(United States) Fred Couples	70-68-72-69=279	−9	100,000
T7	(United States) Paul Azinger	69-72-72-67=280	−8	66,250
T7	(Northern Ireland) Darren Clarke	70-69-68-73=280	−8	66,250
T7	(Sweden) Pierre Fulke	69-72-70-69=280	−8	66,250
T7	(United States) Loren Roberts	69-68-70-73=280	−8	66,250

==== Scorecard ====
Hole	1	2	3	4	5	6	7	8	9	10	11	12	13	14	15	16	17	18
Par	4	4	4	4	5	4	4	3	4	4	3	4	4	5	4	4	4	4
(United States) Woods	−16	−16	−16	−17	−17	−17	−17	−17	−17	−18	−18	−19	−19	−20	−20	−20	−19	−19
(Denmark) Bjørn	−11	−11	−11	−10	−9	−10	−10	−11	−12	−12	−12	−12	−11	−11	−11	−11	−11	−11
(South Africa) Els	−9	−9	−10	−11	−12	−12	−12	−12	−12	−12	−11	−11	−11	−11	−11	−11	−11	−11
(United States) Lehman	−8	−8	−8	−9	−9	−10	−10	−10	−10	−10	−10	−10	−10	−10	−10	−10	−10	−10
(United States) Toms	−9	−9	−9	−10	−9	−10	−11	−12	−13	−13	−12	−12	−11	−11	−9	−10	−9	−10
(United States) Couples	−7	−6	−6	−7	−7	−7	−8	−8	−8	−8	−7	−7	−8	−10	−10	−10	−9	−9
(United States) Azinger	−4	−4	−5	−6	−7	−8	−9	−9	−9	−9	−9	−8	−9	−8	−8	−8	−8	−8
(Northern Ireland) Clarke	−10	−10	−11	−10	−10	−10	−10	−9	−9	−9	−9	−10	−10	−9	−9	−9	−8	−8
(Sweden) Fulke	−5	−5	−5	−6	−6	−6	−6	−6	−7	−7	−7	−8	−8	−8	−8	−8	−7	−8
(United States) Roberts	−9	−9	−9	−8	−9	−8	−9	−9	−10	−10	−10	−10	−10	−10	−10	−10	−9	−8

Cumulative tournament scores, relative to par

Eagle	Birdie	Bogey	Double bogey
