= Mayfair Inn Open =

Golf tournament

Tournament information
- Location: Sanford, Florida
- Established: 1955
- Course: Mayfair Country Club
- Par: 71
- Tour: PGA Tour
- Format: Stroke play
- Prize fund: US$15,000
- Month played: December
- Final year: 1958

Tournament record score
- Aggregate: 263 Mike Fetchick (1956)
- To par: −17 as above

Final champion
- (United States) George Bayer
- Location in the United States Location in Florida

The Mayfair Inn Open was a PGA Tour event that was played for four years in the 1950s. The Mayfair Inn was a 155-room resort hotel on the shores of Lake Monroe in Sanford, Florida known for its opulence and isolation. The PGA Tour event was played in mid-December from 1955–1958 at the Mayfair Country Club, some distance from the hotel. Total prize money was $15,000. The hotel closed in the early 1960s.

== Winners ==
Year	Winner	Score	To par	Margin of victory	Runner(s)-up	Winner's share ($)	Ref.
1958	(United States) George Bayer	272	−12	1 stroke	(United States) Chick Harbert	2,000	
1957	(United States) Walter Burkemo	269	−11	1 stroke	(United States) Jay Hebert (United States) Ed Oliver	2,000	
1956	(United States) Mike Fetchick	263	−17	2 strokes	(United States) Frank Stranahan	2,400	
1955	(Canada) Al Balding	269	−11	1 stroke	(United States) Ed Oliver (United States) Mike Souchak	2,400	
