= 1953 PGA Championship =

Coordinates: 42.533°N 83.234°W

Tournament information
- Dates: July 1–7, 1953
- Location: Birmingham, Michigan, U.S.
- Course: Birmingham Country Club
- Organized by: PGA of America
- Tour: PGA Tour
- Format: Match play - 6 rounds

Statistics
- Par: 71
- Length: 6,465 yards (5,912 m)
- Field: 123 players, 64 to match play
- Cut: 148 (+6), playoff
- Prize fund: $20,700
- Winner's share: $5,000

Champion
- (United States) Walter Burkemo
- def. Felice Torza, 2 and 1

Location in the United States
Location in Michigan

The 1953 PGA Championship was the 35th PGA Championship, held July 1–7 at Birmingham Country Club in Birmingham, Michigan, a suburb northwest of Detroit. Local resident Walter Burkemo won the match play championship, 2 and 1 over Felice Torza in the Tuesday final. The winner's share was $5,000 and the runner-up's was $3,000. Burkemo won his only major title in the second of his three finals; he lost to Sam Snead in 1951 and Chick Harbert in 1954.

Johnny Palmer was the medalist of the stroke play qualifier, awarded $250 for his 134 (−8), with a second round at 66. He lost in the first round to Jack Grout; also defeated on "Black Friday" were pre-tournament favorites Cary Middlecoff, three-time champion Sam Snead, and defending champion Jim Turnesa. No former past champion advanced past the second round.

Burkemo's win marked the second time that all four major championships were won by Americans in a calendar year.

== Format ==
The match play format at the PGA Championship in 1953 called for 12 rounds (216 holes) in seven days:

- Wednesday and Thursday – 36-hole stroke play qualifier, 18 holes per day;
  - defending champion Jim Turnesa and top 63 professionals advanced to match play
- Friday – first two rounds, 18 holes each
- Saturday – third round – 36 holes
- Sunday – quarterfinals – 36 holes
- Monday – semifinals – 36 holes
- Tuesday – final – 36 holes

== Final results ==
Tuesday, July 7, 1953

Place	Player	Money ($)
1	(United States) Walter Burkemo	5,000
2	(United States) Felice Torza	3,000
T3	(United States) Claude Harmon	750
T3	(United States) Jack Isaacs	750
T5	(United States) Jimmy Clark	500
T5	(United States) Dave Douglas	500
T5	(United States) Bill Nary	500
T5	(United States) Henry Ransom	500

== Final eight bracket ==
Quarter-finals; July 5
Walter Burkemo	2up
Dave Douglas
Claude Harmon	6&5
Bill Nary
Felice Torza	1up
Jimmy Clark
Jack Isaacs	1up
Henry Ransom

Semi-finals; July 6
Walter Burkemo	1up
Claude Harmon
Felice Torza	39h
Jack Isaacs

Finals; July 7
Walter Burkemo	2&1
Felice Torza

== Final match scorecards ==
Morning

Hole	1	2	3	4	5	6	7	8	9	10	11	12	13	14	15	16	17	18
Par	5	4	3	4	4	4	3	5	4	4	3	4	4	4	3	4	4	5
(United States) Burkemo	5	4	3	4	4	4	3	5	4	5	3	4	4	4	3	4	4	5
(United States) Torza	4	4	3	5	4	4	3	5	4	4	3	4	5	5	3	5	4	4
Leader	T1	T1	T1	–	–	–	–	–	–	T1	T1	T1	–	B1	B1	B2	B2	B1

Afternoon

Hole	1	2	3	4	5	6	7	8	9	10	11	12	13	14	15	16	17	18
Par	5	4	3	4	4	4	3	5	4	4	3	4	4	4	3	4	4	5
(United States) Burkemo	4	3	3	5	4	4	3	4	4	4	4	4	4	5	3	5	4	
(United States) Torza	5	4	4	4	4	3	3	5	5	4	3	4	5	4	3	4	4	
Leader	B2	B3	B4	B3	B3	B2	B2	B3	B4	B4	B3	B3	B4	B3	B3	B2	B2	

Birdie	Bogey

== Conflict with British Open ==
The Open Championship in Carnoustie, Scotland, was held July 8–10. Its mandatory 36-hole qualifier was played the two days before the first round, the same days as the semifinals and final at the PGA Championship in Michigan.

Ben Hogan, the reigning Masters and U.S. Open champion, traveled to Britain for the only time to qualify for the Open. He won the Claret Jug by four strokes and set the course record at Carnoustie during the final round. First prize was a modest £500 ($1,400), less than one-third of the PGA's. Hogan won the PGA Championship in 1946 and 1948, then did not enter for over a decade. After his near-fatal automobile accident in early 1949, his battered legs could not endure the arduous double-round schedule for five consecutive days. He played in three of the events in the 1960s, after the change of format to stroke play.

The concept of the modern grand slam and professional major championships were not firmly established in 1953, as evidenced by the schedule conflict in early July. The PGA Championship moved two weeks later in 1954 to avoid this conflict, but during the 1960s, the two majors were played in consecutive weeks in July on five occasions. The PGA Championship was first played in August in 1965, and moved permanently in 1969, except for 1971 when it was played in Florida in February.
