= Keller Golf Course =

Classic parkland golf course in Maplewood, Minnesota, USA

Coordinates: 45°0′21″N 93°3′21″W

Keller Golf Course is a public golf course in Maplewood, Minnesota, a suburb of St. Paul. It is owned and operated by Ramsey County.

Keller hosted the St. Paul Open, a PGA Tour event, from 1930 to 1968. It has also hosted two major championships, the 1932 and 1954 PGA Championships; and the 1949 Western Open, which was often considered a major at the time. In the 1970s, it was home to the LPGA Tour's Patty Berg Classic.

== History ==
Keller Golf Course opened in 1929. It was designed by Paul Coates, a Ramsey County civil engineer, who reportedly visited some of America's great golf courses to learn the basics of course architecture. The original clubhouse was designed by architect Cap Wigington.

In October, 2012, The course was closed for major renovations under the direction of architect Richard Mandell, and reopened in July, 2014. The course's original layout was retained but the fairways were converted to bent grass, and all of the greens and bunkers were replaced and brought up to modern standards. Mandell's work was recognized by Golf magazine as the "Best Municipal Renovation" of 2014. Additionally, the clubhouse and pro shop were demolished and replaced with new buildings.

== Keller's Golf Professionals ==
Len Mattson: 1929-1941

Herb Snow: 1942-1968

John Shortridge: 1969-1978

Tom Purcell: 1979-2013

Mark Foley: 2014 - present

== Major tournaments hosted ==
Year	Tournament	Winner
1931	U.S. Amateur Public Links	Charles Ferarra
1932	PGA Championship	Olin Dutra
1949	Western Open	Sam Snead
1954	PGA Championship	Chick Harbert

- St. Paul Open: 1930–1968
- Patty Berg Classic: 1973–1980
