= Art Doering =

American golfer

Personal information
- Full name: Arthur L. Doering, Jr.
- Nationality: United States
- Born: November 4, 1915
- Died: November 5, 1988 (aged 73)

Career
- Sport: Golf
- College: Stanford University
- Turned professional: 1945
- Former tour: PGA Tour
- Professional wins: 4

Number of wins by tour
- PGA Tour: 1
- Other: 3

Best results in major championships
- Masters Tournament: 45th: 1940
- PGA Championship: T17: 1954
- U.S. Open: T41: 1938
- The Open Championship: DNP

Arthur L. Doering, Jr. (November 4, 1915 – November 5, 1988) was a golfer who played in PGA Tour events from the 1930s through the 1960s.

== Early life and amateur career ==
In 1915, Doering was born. He attended Stanford University. Doering was a member of the golf team for the Class of 1940. He is a member of the Stanford Athletic Hall of Fame.

== Professional career ==
In 1945, Doering turned professional. His best career finish in a stroke play major championship was a T-41 at the 1938 U.S. Open while he was a student a Stanford and still an amateur. He lost in the round of 32 at the 1954 PGA Championship.

Doering earned his only PGA Tour victory at the 1951 Greater Greensboro Open.

In the early 1960s, Doering was president and head pro at the Yolo Fliers Club in Woodland, California. During his tenure, he oversaw the building of a new clubhouse.

== Awards and honors ==
Doering is a member of the Stanford Athletic Hall of Fame

== Amateur wins (1) ==
this list may be incomplete

- 1940 Trans-Mississippi Amateur

== Professional wins (4) ==
=== PGA Tour wins (1) ===
- 1951 Greater Greensboro Open

=== Other wins (3) ===
this list may be incomplete

- 1939 Santa Clara County Championship
- 1954 Metropolitan Open
- 1955 Long Island Open
