= Randy Erskine =

American professional golfer (born 1948)

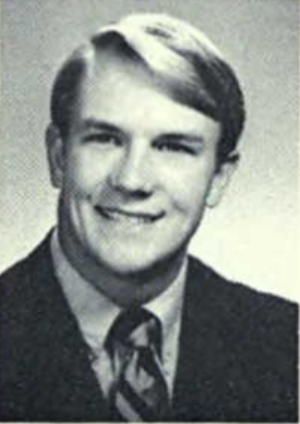
- Erskine from 1970 Michiganensian

Personal information
- Nationality: United States
- Born: July 8, 1948 (age 78) Springfield, Ohio, U.S.
- Height: 6 ft 1 in (1.85 m)
- Weight: 175 lb (79 kg; 12.5 st)

Career
- Sport: Golf
- College: University of Michigan
- Turned professional: 1973
- Former tour: PGA Tour
- Professional wins: 11

Best results in major championships
- Masters Tournament: DNP
- PGA Championship: CUT: 1979
- U.S. Open: CUT: 1985
- The Open Championship: DNP

Randy Erskine (born July 8, 1948) is an American professional golfer. He played as an amateur at the University of Michigan and won the 1970 Big Ten Conference championship. He turned professional in 1973 and won the Michigan Open five times between 1976 and 1985. He also won the 1978 Michigan PGA Championship, finished fifth at the 1977 Buick Open, and won the 2011 Michigan Senior PGA Championship.

== Early life and amateur career ==
In 1948, Erskine was born in Springfield, Ohio and raised in Battle Creek, Michigan. In 1966, he graduated from Pennfield High School.

In 1966, Erskine began attending the University of Michigan where he won the 1970 Big Ten Conference golf championship at Savoy, Illinois. He was also selected as an All-American in 1968 and 1970.

As an amateur, Erskine also won the 1972 Michigan State Amateur Championship, the Michigan Medal Play, and the GAM Championship.

== Professional career ==
In 1973, Erskine began competing as a professional. He played on the PGA Tour from 1974 to 1979, with his best finish coming at the 1977 Buick Open where he tied for fifth place.

Erskine also had some success in local events: he won the 1978 Michigan PGA Championship and was a five-time winner of the Michigan Open: in 1976, 1978, 1979, 1984, and 1985. He also was a two-time winner of the MPGA Match Play.

== Honors and awards ==
- In 1989, Erskine was inducted into the University of Michigan Athletic Hall of Honor.
- In 1991, Erskine was inducted the Michigan Golf Hall of Fame.

== Amateur wins ==
this list may be incomplete

- 1968 Michigan Medal Play
- 1970 Big Ten Championship
- 1972 Michigan State Amateur Championship

== Professional wins ==
this list may be incomplete

- 1976 Michigan Open
- 1978 Michigan Open, Michigan PGA Championship
- 1979 Michigan Open
- 1982 Michigan Pro-Am Championship (with Danny Roberts)
- 1984 Michigan Open, PGA Club Professional Tournament Series event at Monte Carlo Country Club, Fort Pierce, Florida
- 1985 Michigan Open, PGA Club Professional Tournament at Marion Oaks Country Club
- 1986 Michigan PGA Match Play Tournament
- 2011 Michigan Senior PGA Championship

== See also ==
- 1973 PGA Tour Qualifying School graduates
