= Career Grand Slam =

Career Grand Slam may refer to:

- Tennis Career Grand Slam
- Golf Career Grand Slam
