= Birmingham Country Club (Michigan) =

Golf course in Birmingham, Michigan

Coordinates: 42°32′01″N 83°14′06″W

Birmingham Country Club, located in Bloomfield Twp, Michigan (but with a Birmingham, Michigan address), was founded in 1916 as Birmingham Golf Club. The golf course at the club hosted the PGA Championship in 1953, which Walter Burkemo won, as well as the 1968 United States Women's Amateur Golf Championship.
