= Felice Torza =

American professional golfer (1920–1983

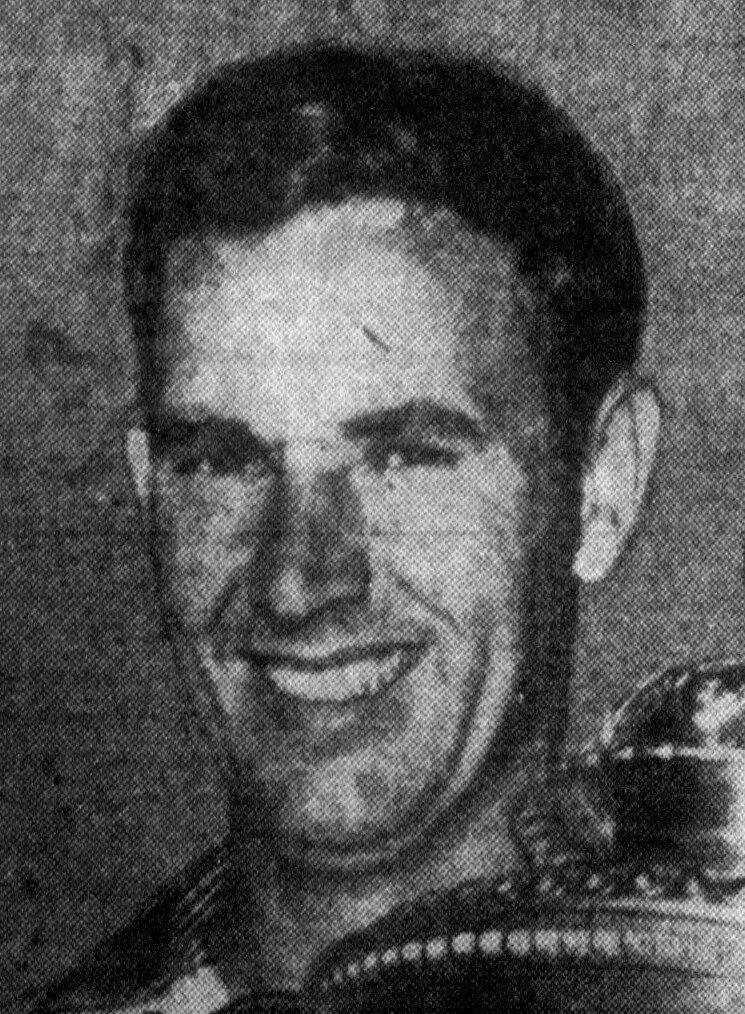
- Torza, circa 1953

Personal information
- Full name: Felice Joseph Torza
- Nationality: United States
- Born: March 15, 1920 Naples, Italy
- Died: December 23, 1983 (aged 63)

Career
- Sport: Golf
- Status: Professional
- Former tour: PGA Tour
- Professional wins: 5

Best results in major championships
- Masters Tournament: T29: 1953
- PGA Championship: 2nd: 1953
- U.S. Open: T24: 1952
- The Open Championship: DNP

Felice Joseph Torza (March 15, 1920 – December 23, 1983) was an American professional golfer. He played primarily in the 1940s, 1950s and 1960s.

== Early life ==
Torza was born in Naples, Italy, on March 15, 1920.

== Professional career ==
Like most of the golfers of his generation, he earned his living primarily as a club professional during his regular career years. Torza worked as the head club pro at the Aurora Country Club in Aurora, Illinois for 28 years.

Torza was the runner-up in the 1953 PGA Championship. He was defeated, 2 and 1, in the final by Walter Burkemo, in the match play era.

Torza was nicknamed Toy Tiger by his fellow golfers due to his fiercely competitive nature and diminutive stature.

== Death ==
Torza died on December 23, 1983.

== Honors and awards ==
- In 1965, he was inducted into the Connecticut Golf Hall of Fame.
- In 1968, he was awarded the Illinois PGA Professional of the Year award.

== Professional wins (5) ==
- 1946 Connecticut Open
- 1947 Rhode Island Open
- 1950 Illinois Open Championship
- 1958 Illinois Open Championship
- 1965 Illinois Match Play Championship
