= Walter Burkemo =

American professional golfer (1918–1986)

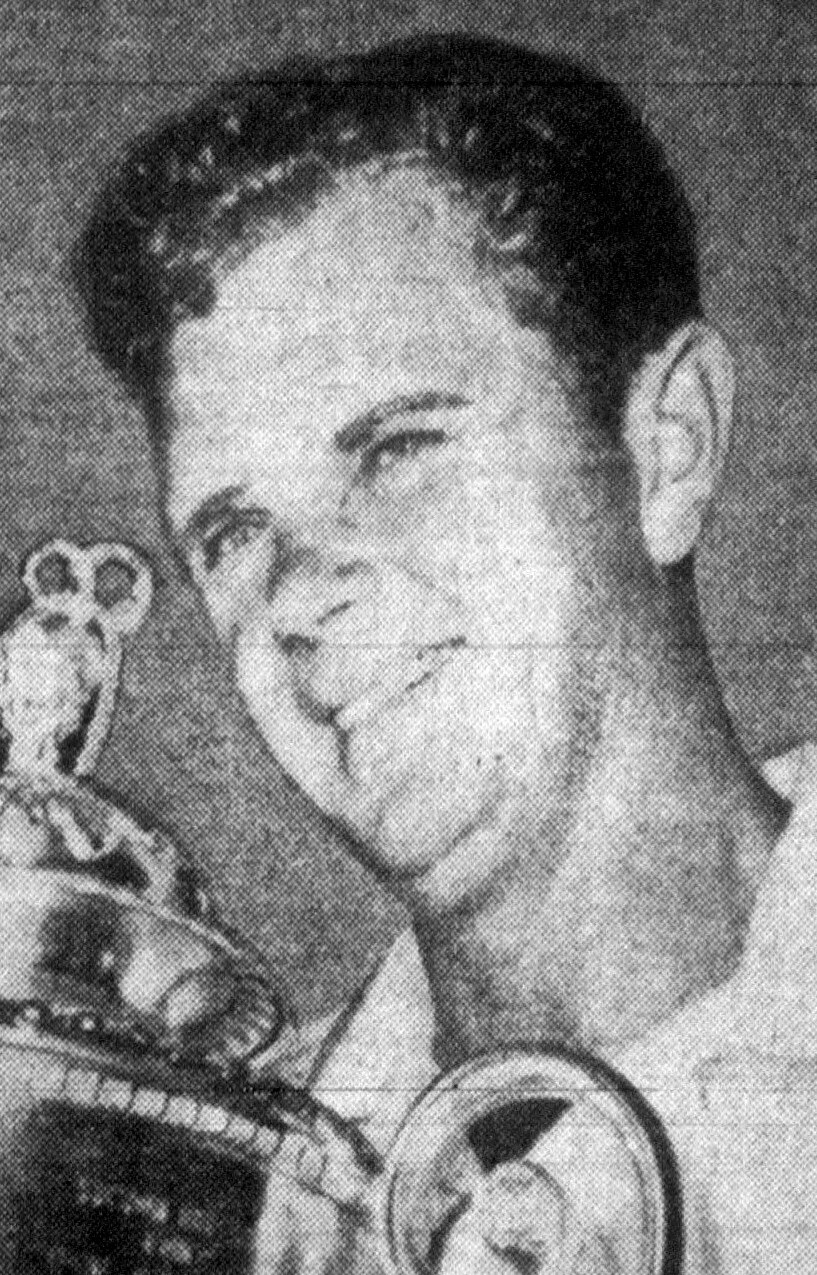
- Burkemo, circa 1953

Personal information
- Full name: Walter E. Burkemo
- Nationality: United States
- Born: October 9, 1918 Detroit, Michigan, U.S.
- Died: October 8, 1986 (aged 67) Fenton, Michigan, U.S.

Career
- Sport: Golf
- Turned professional: Professional
- Former tour: PGA Tour
- Professional wins: 8

Number of wins by tour
- PGA Tour: 2
- Other: 6

Best results in major championships (wins: 1)
- Masters Tournament: T6: 1960
- PGA Championship: Won: 1953
- U.S. Open: T4: 1957
- The Open Championship: DNP

Walter Burkemo
- Military career
- Allegiance: United States
- Branch: U.S. Army
- Rank: Sergeant
- Conflicts: World War II, European Theater; Battle of the Bulge
- Awards: Purple Heart (2)

Walter E. Burkemo (October 9, 1918 – October 8, 1986) was an American professional golfer, best known for winning the PGA Championship in 1953.

== Early life ==
Burkemo was born in Detroit, Michigan. He was the youngest of 13 children of Norwegian immigrants who settled there. He began in golf at the age of 8 by caddying at Lochmoor Country Club in Detroit.

== Professional career ==
Burkemo won his first title in 1938 at the Southern Florida Open; however, World War II intervened soon thereafter and he found himself drafted into the U.S. Army. Burkemo served in the infantry as a sergeant in the European Theater. He was seriously wounded twice, earning two Purple Hearts, the second time during the Battle of the Bulge.

Burkemo resumed his PGA Tour career after recovering from his injuries. He had little success in the late 1940s; but in 1951, his luck began to change when he won his first of four Michigan Opens. His best years in professional golf were in the early 1950s; he won the PGA Championship in 1953 and was runner-up in 1951 and 1954. Although he was one of the most consistent top-10 finishers on the tour, he would go on to win only one more event, the Mayfair Inn Open in 1957. He was a member of the Ryder Cup team in 1953.

The 1953 PGA Championship was played in July at Birmingham Country Club in Birmingham, Michigan, only six miles (10 km) from the Franklin Hills Country Club where Burkemo was club pro. He benefited from a so-called "home field advantage" because during the match play era, the PGA Championship was a marathon of double rounds for five straight days. The week began with 36 holes of qualifying on Wednesday and Thursday, followed by six matches – two rounds at 18 holes each on Friday and the last four rounds at 36 holes, concluding with the final on Tuesday. He also benefited from the fact that Ben Hogan, the reigning Masters and U.S. Open champion, was in Scotland to practice and qualify for the British Open, which started the day after the PGA Championship final match. In an era without any exemptions, the British Open's mandatory 36-hole qualifier immediately preceded the competition on Monday and Tuesday, during the semifinals and finals of the PGA. (After his automobile accident in 1949, Hogan did not enter the PGA Championship until 1960, then a stroke play event.) Burkemo's toughest match en route to the final against Felice Torza was in the semifinals against 1948 Masters champion Claude Harmon. Burkemo was 3 down after 11 holes but rallied and birdied the 36th hole to win 1 up.

After the 1954 season, Burkemo returned to life as a club pro because the grind of the PGA Tour was proving too difficult for him to maintain with a wife and four children. He continued to play the tour part-time for the rest of his career. He and his brother Vic opened Burkemo's driving range in St. Clair Shores.

== Personal life ==
Burkemo died in Fenton a day before his 68th birthday.

== Awards and honors ==
Burkemo was inducted into the Michigan Sports Hall of Fame and the Michigan Golf Hall of Fame.

== Professional wins (8) ==
=== PGA Tour wins (2) ===
Legend
Major championships (1)
Other PGA Tour (1)

No.	Date	Tournament	Winning score	Margin of victory	Runner(s)-up
1	Jul 7, 1953	PGA Championship	2 and 1		(United States) Felice Torza
2	Dec 15, 1957	Mayfair Inn Open	−11 (70-65-66-68=269)	1 stroke	(United States) Jay Hebert, (United States) Ed Oliver

=== Other wins (6) ===
this list is probably incomplete

- 1938 Southern Florida Open
- 1951 Michigan Open
- 1955 Michigan Open, Michigan PGA Championship
- 1957 Michigan Open
- 1970 Michigan Open

== Major championships ==
=== Wins (1) ===
Year	Championship	Winning score	Runner-up
1953	PGA Championship	2 & 1	(United States) Felice Torza

Note: The PGA Championship was match play until 1958

=== Results timeline ===
Tournament	1937	1938	1939
Masters Tournament			
U.S. Open	CUT		
PGA Championship			

Tournament	1940	1941	1942	1943	1944	1945	1946	1947	1948	1949
Masters Tournament				NT	NT	NT				
U.S. Open			NT	NT	NT	NT				
PGA Championship				NT						

Tournament	1950	1951	1952	1953	1954	1955	1956	1957	1958	1959
Masters Tournament			T42		T22	T15	T17	CUT	CUT	T22
U.S. Open	T36	CUT		T40	CUT	CUT	T29	T4	T5	WD
PGA Championship		2	R16	1	2	R64	R16	3	T16	T17

Tournament	1960	1961	1962	1963	1964	1965	1966	1967	1968	1969
Masters Tournament	T6	T11	CUT	T43	CUT					
U.S. Open	T49	CUT		T8	CUT		T22			
PGA Championship	T24	14	T39	CUT	T17	T41	CUT	CUT	CUT	

Tournament	1970	1971
Masters Tournament		
U.S. Open		
PGA Championship	CUT	CUT

Note: Burkemo never played in The Open Championship

Win
Top 10
Did not play

WD = withdrew
CUT = missed the half-way cut
R64, R32, R16, QF, SF = Round in which player lost in PGA Championship match play
"T" indicates a tie for a place

=== Summary ===
Tournament	Wins	2nd	3rd	Top-5	Top-10	Top-25	Events	Cuts made
Masters Tournament	0	0	0	0	1	6	12	8
U.S. Open	0	0	0	2	3	4	14	8
The Open Championship	0	0	0	0	0	0	0	0
PGA Championship	1	2	1	4	6	11	20	14
Totals	1	2	1	6	10	21	46	30

- Most consecutive cuts made – 6 (1951 PGA – 1954 Masters)
- Longest streak of top-10s – 2 (1957 U.S. Open – 1957 PGA)

== U.S. national team appearances ==
- Ryder Cup: 1953 (winners)
- Hopkins Trophy: 1954 (winners)

== See also ==
- List of men's major championships winning golfers
