= Michigan Open =

The Michigan Open is the Michigan state open golf tournament, open to both amateur and professional golfers. It is organized by the Michigan section of the PGA of America. It has been played annually since 1916 at a variety of courses around the state.

== Winners ==
- 2026 Cameron Ruge
- 2025 Otto Black
- 2024 Eric Lilleboe
- 2023 Joe Juszczyk
- 2022 Jake Kneen (a)
- 2021 Bradley Smithson (a)
- 2020 Brett White
- 2019 Eric Lilleboe
- 2018 Jake Kneen (a)
- 2017 Matt Thompson
- 2016 Jeff Bronkema
- 2015 Jeff Cuzzort
- 2014 Ryan Brehm
- 2013 Tom Werkmeister (a)
- 2012 Barrett Kelpin
- 2011 Randy Hutchison
- 2010 Ryan Brehm
- 2009 Ryan Brehm
- 2008 Tom Gillis
- 2007 Andrew Ruthkoski
- 2006 Scott Hebert
- 2005 Michael Harris
- 2004 Jeff Roth
- 2003 Bob Ackerman
- 2002 Scott Hebert
- 2001 Scott Hebert
- 2000 Scott Hebert
- 1999 Scott Hebert
- 1998 Jeff Roth
- 1997 Scott Hebert
- 1996 Steve Brady
- 1995 Dave Smith
- 1994 Tom Gillis
- 1993 Brent Veenstra
- 1992 Steve Brady
- 1991 Steve Brady
- 1990 Robert Proben
- 1989 Barry Redmond
- 1988 Ed Humenik
- 1987 Jack Seltzer
- 1986 Tim Matthews
- 1985 Randy Erskine
- 1984 Randy Erskine
- 1983 Buddy Whitten
- 1982 Buddy Whitten
- 1981 Fred Muller
- 1980 Lynn Janson
- 1979 Randy Erskine
- 1978 Randy Erskine
- 1977 Tom Deaton
- 1976 Randy Erskine
- 1975 Bob Ackerman III (a)
- 1974 Lynn Janson
- 1973 George Bayer
- 1972 Ron Fox
- 1971 Ted Kondratko
- 1970 Walter Burkemo
- 1969 Charles Knowles
- 1968 John Molenda
- 1967 Mike Souchak
- 1966 Gene Bone
- 1965 Gene Bone
- 1964 Thom Rosely
- 1963 Phil Wiechman
- 1962 Pete Brown
- 1961 John Barnum
- 1960 John Barnum
- 1959 Dave Hill
- 1958 John Barnum
- 1957 Walter Burkemo
- 1956 Pete Cooper
- 1955 Walter Burkemo
- 1954 Horton Smith
- 1953 Chick Harbert
- 1952 Mike Dietz
- 1951 Walter Burkemo
- 1950 John Barnum
- 1949 Al Watrous
- 1948 Chick Harbert
- 1947 Buck White
- 1946 Chuck Kocsis (a)
- 1945 Chuck Kocsis (a)
- 1944 Sam Byrd
- 1943 Al Watrous
- 1942 Chick Harbert
- 1941 Gib Sellers
- 1940 Emerick Kocsis
- 1939 Marvin Stahl
- 1938 Marvin Stahl
- 1937 Chick Harbert (a)
- 1936 Marvin Stahl
- 1935 Jake Fassezke
- 1934 Jake Fassezke
- 1933 Mortie Dutra
- 1932 Clarence Gamber
- 1931 Chuck Kocsis (a)
- 1930 Al Watrous
- 1929 Al Watrous
- 1928 George Von Elm (a)
- 1927 Al Watrous
- 1926 Al Watrous
- 1925 Davey Robertson
- 1924 No record
- 1923 Harry Hampton
- 1922 No record
- 1921 Walter Hagen
- 1920 Mike Brady
- 1919 Leo Diegel
- 1917–18 No tournament
- 1916 Leo Diegel
- (a) denotes amateur
