= Grand Slam (golf) =

Feat in professional golf; winning all major championships in the same year

In golf, winning all of the sport's major championships in the same calendar year constitutes the Grand Slam. The modern (professional) Grand Slam would mean winning the Masters Tournament, PGA Championship, U.S. Open, and Open Championship in the same year. Before the rise of professional tournament golf, the Grand Slam was achieved in 1930 when Bobby Jones won the four major championships of that era: The Amateur Championship, The Open Championship, the United States Open, and the United States Amateur.

Variations include a Career Grand Slam, which involves winning all of the major tournaments within a player's career. Six golfers have accomplished this: Gene Sarazen, Ben Hogan, Gary Player, Jack Nicklaus, Tiger Woods, and Rory McIlroy. Holding all four major titles at the same time has been done only once, by Woods in 2000–2001, and has become known as the Tiger Slam. A pre-Masters era professional career Grand Slam was achieved by Tommy Armour and Walter Hagen, in winning The Open, U.S. Open and PGA along with Canadian Open, Western Open and Metropolitan Open, the next three biggest tournaments of the time.

== Men's golf ==
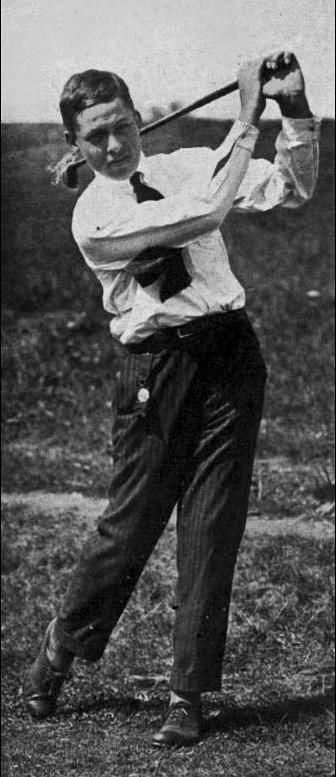
Bobby Jones, who won the pre-Masters era Career Grand Slam in 1930, is the only golfer to win four majors in the same year.

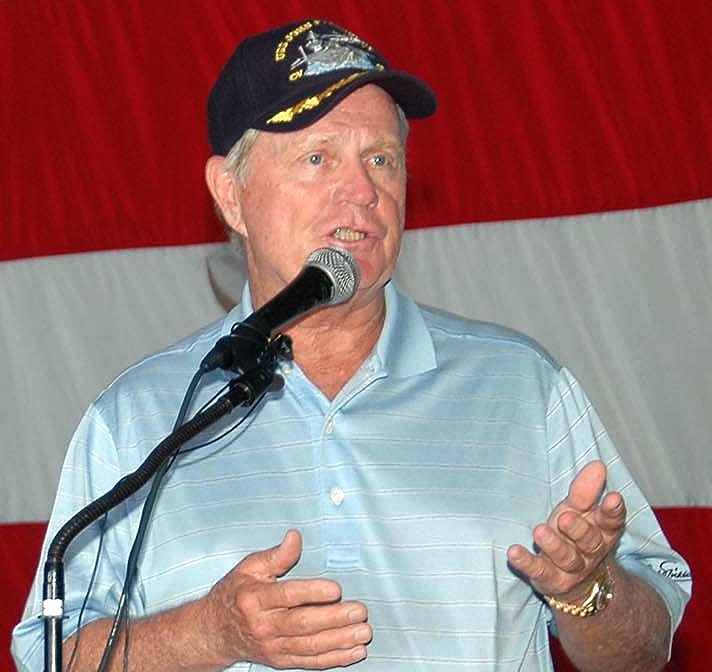
Jack Nicklaus won the Career Grand Slam three times.

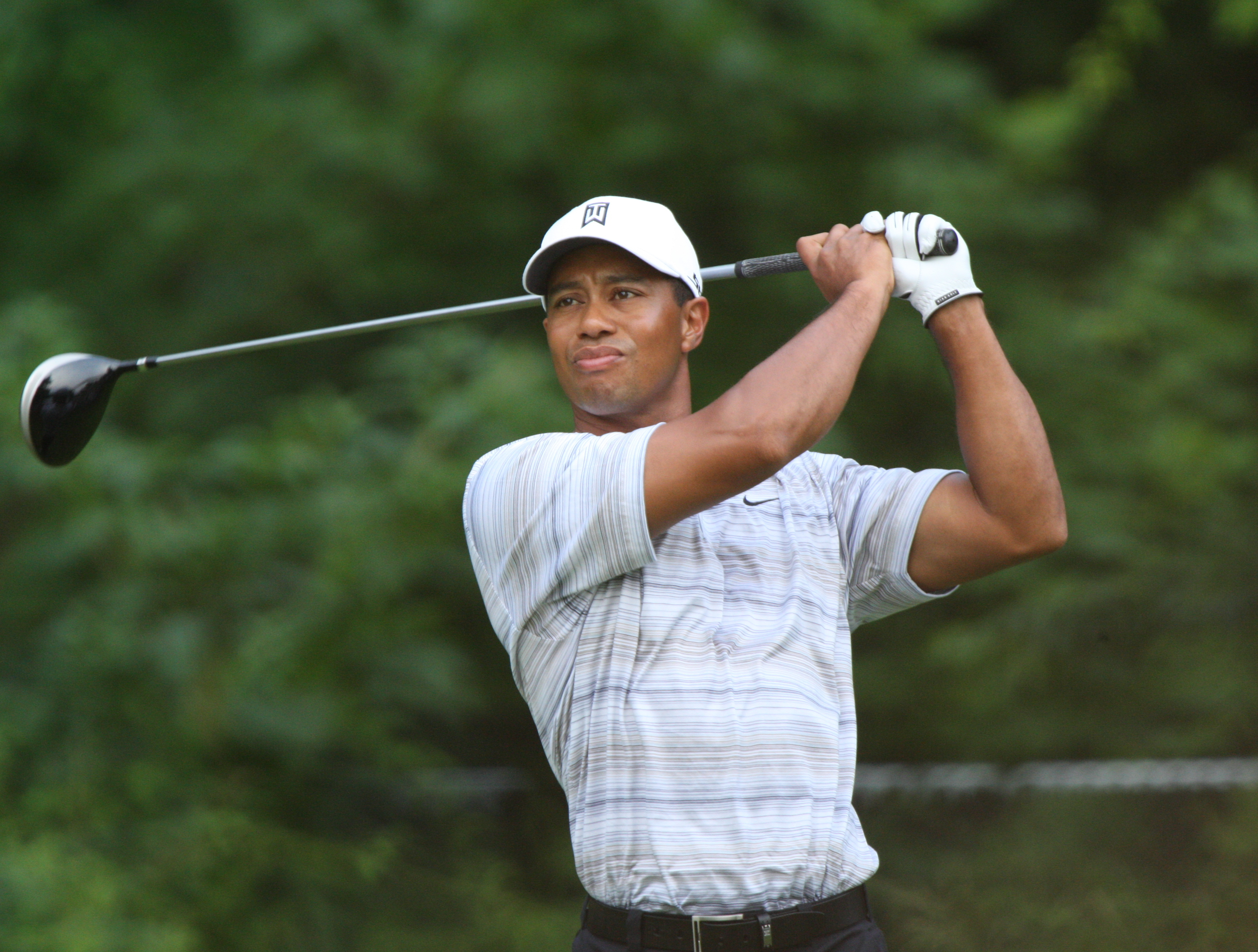
Tiger Woods won the Career Grand Slam three times.

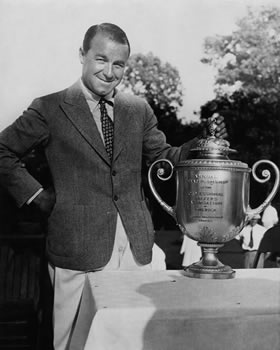
Gene Sarazen won a Career Grand Slam.

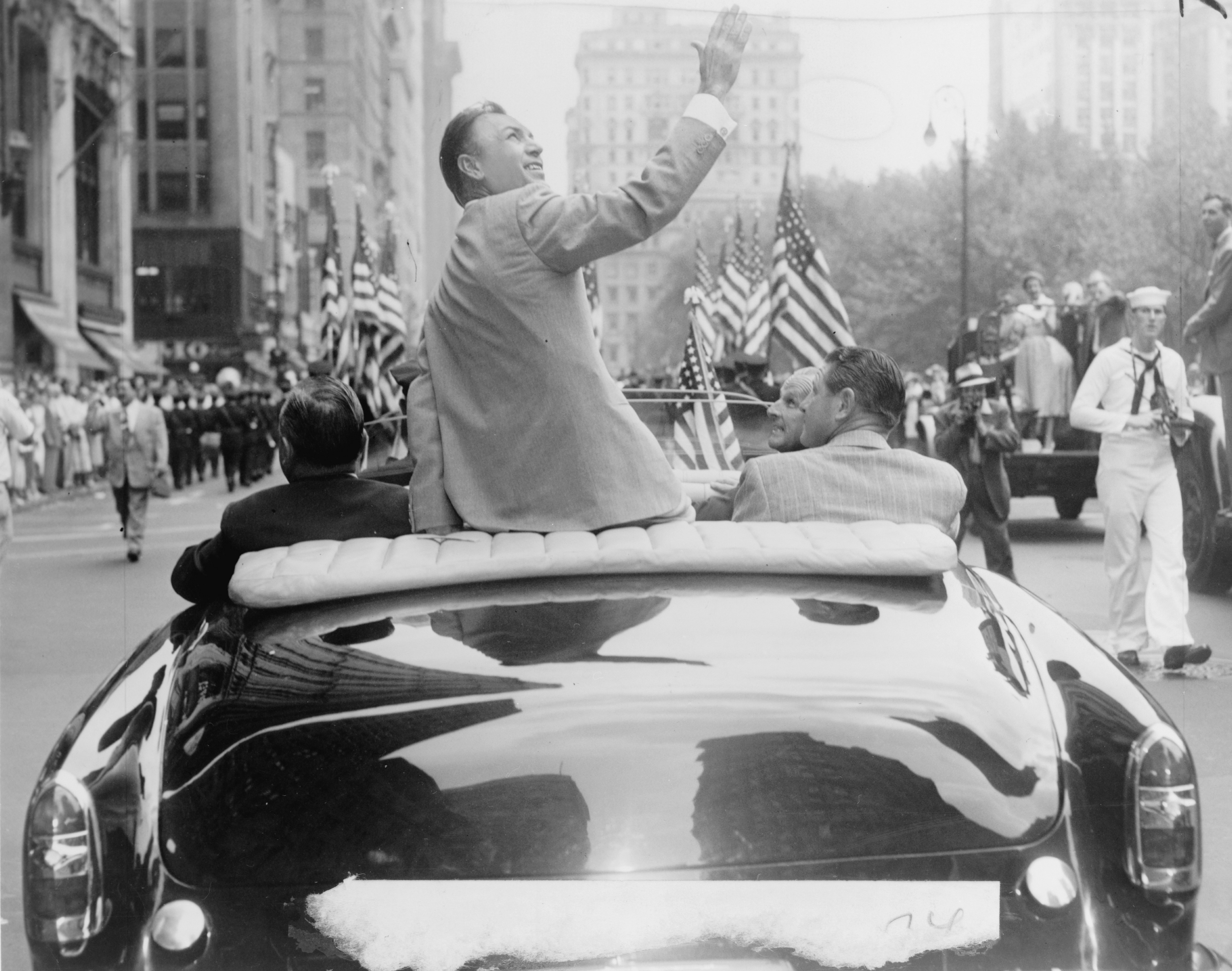
Ben Hogan won a Career Grand Slam.

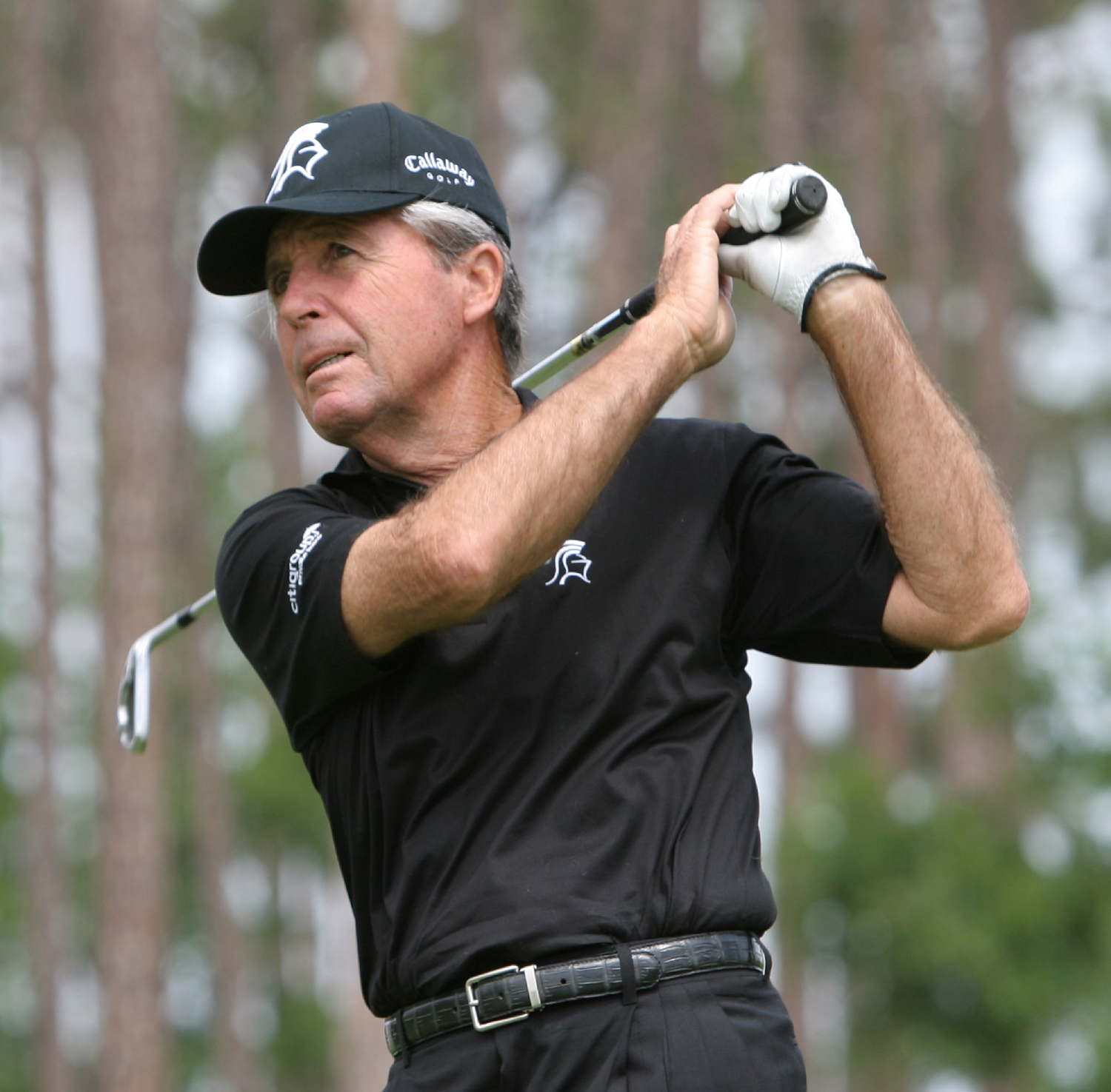
Gary Player won a Career Grand Slam.

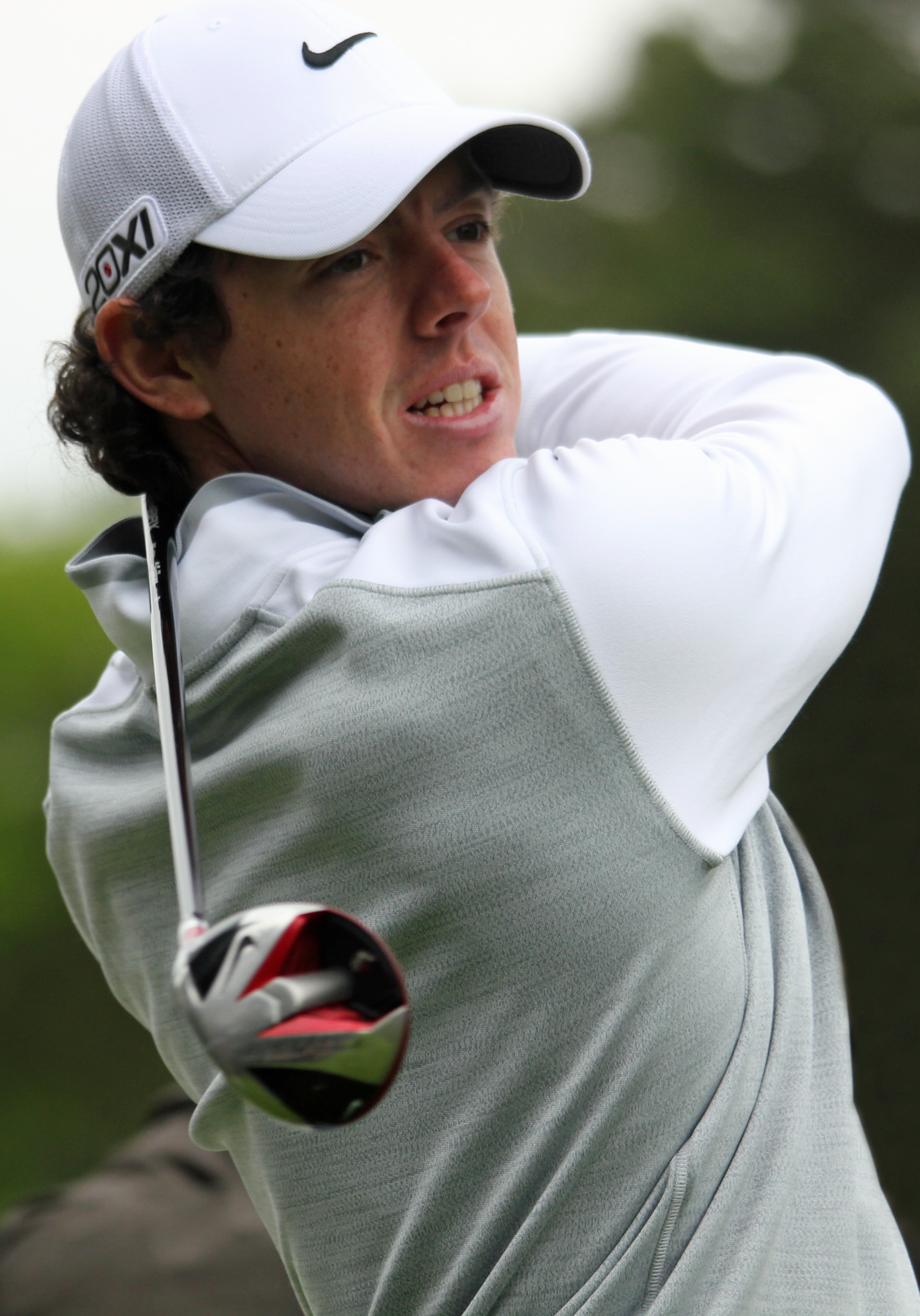
Rory McIlroy won a Career Grand Slam.

The Grand Slam in men's golf is an unofficial term for winning all four major championships in the same year.

In the modern era, the Grand Slam requires victories in four tournaments in a single calendar year (listed in current playing order):

1. Masters Tournament, held the week ending on the 2nd Sunday in April – hosted as an invitational by and played at Augusta National Golf Club
2. PGA Championship (also known as the "United States PGA Championship" or "USPGA"), held the week ending on the 3rd Sunday in May, one week before Memorial Day weekend – hosted by the PGA of America and played at various locations in the United States. Prior to 2019, it was held in mid-August, three weeks before Labor Day weekend.
3. U.S. Open, held the week ending on the 3rd Sunday or Father's Day in June – hosted by the USGA and played at various locations in the United States.
4. The Open Championship ("The Open", sometimes called "the British Open" outside the UK), held the week containing the 3rd Friday in July – hosted by The R&A and always played on a links course at one of several predetermined locations in the United Kingdom on a rota basis.

Prior to the creation of the Masters Tournament, the national amateur championships of the U.S. and the UK were considered major championships. During that earlier era, the Grand Slam comprised consecutive victories at the U.S. Amateur, The Amateur Championship (British Amateur) along with the U.S. Open and the Open Championship.

The term Grand Slam was first applied to Bobby Jones' achievement of winning the four major golf events of 1930 open to amateurs: The Open Championship (containing pros and amateurs), the U.S. Open (containing pros and amateurs), the U.S. Amateur (containing amateurs only), and the British Amateur (containing amateurs only). When Jones won all four, the sports world searched for ways to capture the magnitude of his accomplishment. Up to that time, there was no term for such a feat because no one had thought it possible. The Atlanta Journal's O. B. Keeler dubbed it the "Grand Slam," borrowing a bridge term. George Trevor of the New York Sun wrote that Jones had "stormed the impregnable quadrilateral of golf." Keeler would later write the words that would forever be linked to one of the greatest individual accomplishments in the history of sports:

This victory, the fourth major title in the same season and in the space of four months, had now and for all time entrenched Bobby Jones safely within the 'Impregnable Quadrilateral of Golf,' that granite fortress that he alone could take by escalade, and that others may attack in vain, forever.

During this era, a professional Grand Slam was also talked about, comprising the two open major championships, along with the PGA Championship and the three next biggest tournaments: the Canadian Open, Western Open and Metropolitan Open. Completing this professional grand slam during their career was achieved by Tommy Armour and Walter Hagen, who both completed it in 1931.

The modern definition of four majors open to pros and amateurs could not be applied until at least 1934, when the Masters was founded, and still carried little weight in 1953 when Ben Hogan won the Masters, U.S. Open, and Open Championship. That year, it was impossible to win all four because the PGA Championship preceded and overlapped with the Open Championship; the PGA's 36-hole match play semifinals and finals near Detroit were the same days as the mandatory 36-hole qualifier at Carnoustie in Scotland for the Open Championship; the only way to compete in both events was to lose an early match at the PGA. Hogan is the only player to have won the Masters, U.S. Open, and Open Championship in the same calendar year.

In 1960, Arnold Palmer won the Masters in April and U.S. Open in June. According to his autobiography, A Golfer's Life, he and his friend Bob Drum (of the Pittsburgh Press), while on the trans-Atlantic flight to The Open Championship at St Andrews, came up with the idea that adding it and the PGA Championship titles that July would constitute a modern Grand Slam. Drum spread the notion among the gathered media and it caught on. However, a newspaper article on 12 April 1960 titled "Biggest Grand Slam May Be Palmer Goal" stated:

Arnold Palmer, the Midas of the fairways, has charted a course which could carry him to the biggest grand slam in golf since Bobby Jones' feat in 1930. The Pennsylvania strongman with golfdom's golden touch passed his first landmark when he won the 24th Masters tournament yesterday with a pulsating stretch drive. Three more big ones remain — the U.S. Open in Denver June 16–18, the 100th anniversary British Open at historic St. Andrews July 4–9 and the PGA championship in Akron, Ohio, July 28–31. If the 29-year-old Palmer can add those three jewels to his Masters crown the performance will rank on a par with Jones' grand slam year.

Two years earlier, the PGA had changed to stroke play, and it started to be held two weeks after the Open Championship in 1960. Scheduling problems continued through the 1960s because the last two majors were held in successive weeks in July on five occasions. The PGA was played in August in 1965 but returned to July for the next three. With the formation of the Tournament Players Division in late 1968, now the PGA Tour, the PGA Championship moved to August in 1969 and, except for the 1971 edition, held in late February to avoid the summer heat of Florida, continued to be held during that month until 2018. Since 2019 it is held in May.

Tiger Woods came closest to winning a modern Grand Slam by holding all four major titles at the same time. He won all four major championships consecutively – the U.S. Open, Open Championship, and PGA Championship in 2000, and the 2001 Masters – but not in the same calendar year. This has been called the Tiger Slam. In fact, even before Woods accomplished this, there was much debate over the definition of "Grand Slam." Fred Couples said, "I don't know how I can put it more simply ... if he wins all four, it's a Slam."

Only six golfers have won all four of golf's modern majors at any time during their careers, an achievement which is often referred to as a Career Grand Slam: Gene Sarazen, Ben Hogan, Gary Player, Jack Nicklaus, Tiger Woods, and Rory McIlroy. Woods and Nicklaus have won each of the four majors at least three times.

The term also refers to a former tour tournament, the PGA Grand Slam of Golf, an annual off-season tournament, that was cancelled after the 2014 tournament, contested by the winners of the four major championships.

=== Career Grand Slam ===
Most overall ‡

==== Original Grand Slam ====
Player	Major titles	Grand slams	U.S. Amateur	U.S. Open	The Open	The Amateur
(United States) Bobby Jones	**13**	1: 1930	5: 1924, 1925, 1927, 1928, 1930 ‡	4: 1923, 1926, 1929, 1930 ‡	3: 1926, 1927, 1930	1: 1930

==== Early era professional Grand Slam ====
Years in bold denotes win that completed the career Grand Slam.

Player	Major titles	The Open	U.S. Open	PGA	Western Open	Canadian Open	Metropolitan Open
(United States) (Scotland) Tommy Armour	**3**	1: **1931**	1: 1927	1: 1930	1: 1929	1: 1930	1: 1928
(United States) Walter Hagen	**11**	4: 1922, 1924, 1928, 1929	2: 1914, 1919	5: 1921, 1924, 1925, 1926, 1927 ‡	5: 1916, 1921, 1926, 1927, 1932	1: **1931**	3: 1916, 1919, 1920

==== Modern era Grand Slam ====
Years in bold denotes win that completed the career Grand Slam. ^{Number} denotes which of multiple Grand slams was completed by winning this event.

Player	Major titles	Career Grand Slams	Masters	U.S. Open	The Open	PGA	Years to complete 1st Grand Slam
(United States) Gene Sarazen	**7**	**1**	1: **1935**	2: 1922, 1932	1: 1932	3: 1922, 1923, 1933	14: 1922–1935
(United States) Ben Hogan	**9**	**1**	2: 1951, 1953	4: 1948, 1950, 1951, 1953 ‡	1: **1953**	2: 1946, 1948	8: 1946–1953
(South Africa) Gary Player	**9**	**1**	3: 1961, 1974, 1978	1: **1965**	3: 1959, 1968, 1974	2: 1962, 1972	7: 1959–1965
(United States) Jack Nicklaus	**18** ‡	**3** ‡	6: 1963, 1965, 1966, 1972, 1975, 1986 ‡	4: 1962, 1967, 1972, 1980 ‡	3: **1966^{1}**, 1970, **1978^{3}**	5: 1963, **1971^{2}**, 1973, 1975, 1980 ‡	5: 1962–1966
(United States) Tiger Woods	**15**	**3** ‡	5: 1997, 2001, 2002, 2005, 2019	3: 2000, 2002, **2008^{3}**	3: **2000^{1}**, **2005^{2}**, 2006	4: 1999, 2000, 2006, 2007	4: 1997–2000
(Northern Ireland) Rory McIlroy	**6**	**1**	2: **2025,** 2026	1: 2011	1: 2014	2: 2012, 2014	15: 2011–2025

===== Players in search of the modern era career Grand Slam =====
Several players in the modern era have been one major championship short of completing the career grand slam, having never won (those in italics remain active as of 2025):

- Masters Tournament: Lee Trevino (6 major championships)
- PGA Championship: Arnold Palmer (7), Tom Watson (8), Jordan Spieth (3)
- U.S. Open: Sam Snead (7), Phil Mickelson (6), Scottie Scheffler (4)
- The Open: Byron Nelson (5), Raymond Floyd (4)

Tommy Armour (3), Jim Barnes (4) and Walter Hagen (11) also won three of the four but were in the twilight of their careers when the Masters Tournament was founded and would not have been expected to win at that time.

Despite not being a major championship, The Players Championship is often regarded as the next most prestigious tournament in golf, being dubbed the "fifth major.” Winning the tournament does not impact the achievement of a Grand Slam; however, since its creation in 1974, several Grand Slam winners have also won this tournament: Jack Nicklaus (1974, 1976, 1978), Tiger Woods (2001, (Note: Won within the same period as his Tiger Slam) 2013), and Rory McIlroy (2019, 2025). Gary Player is the only modern Grand Slam winner who did not achieve the additional win at The Players Championship during his career, as Gene Sarazen and Ben Hogan played before the tournament’s inception.

== Women's golf ==
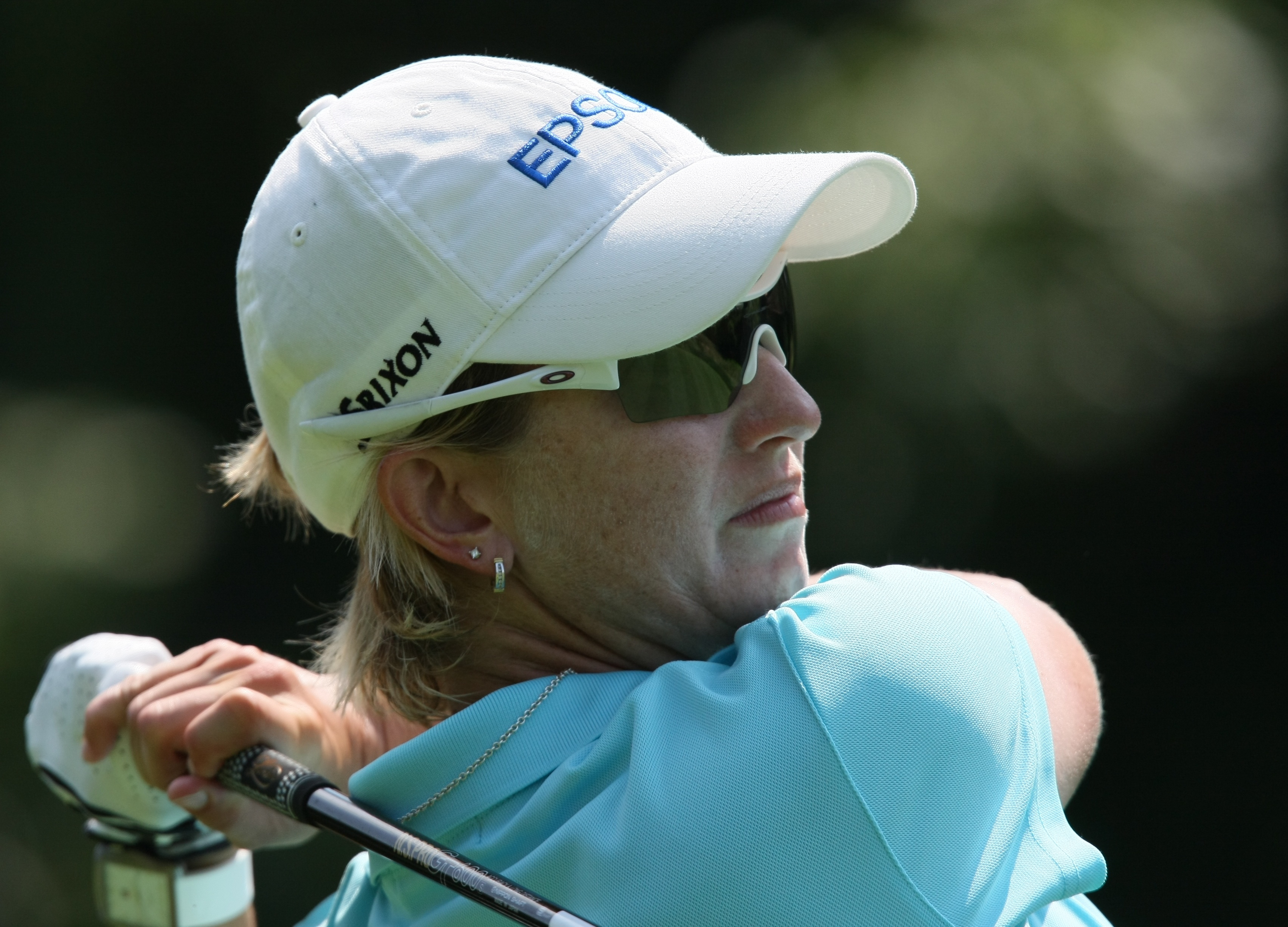
Karrie Webb won a super career grand slam.

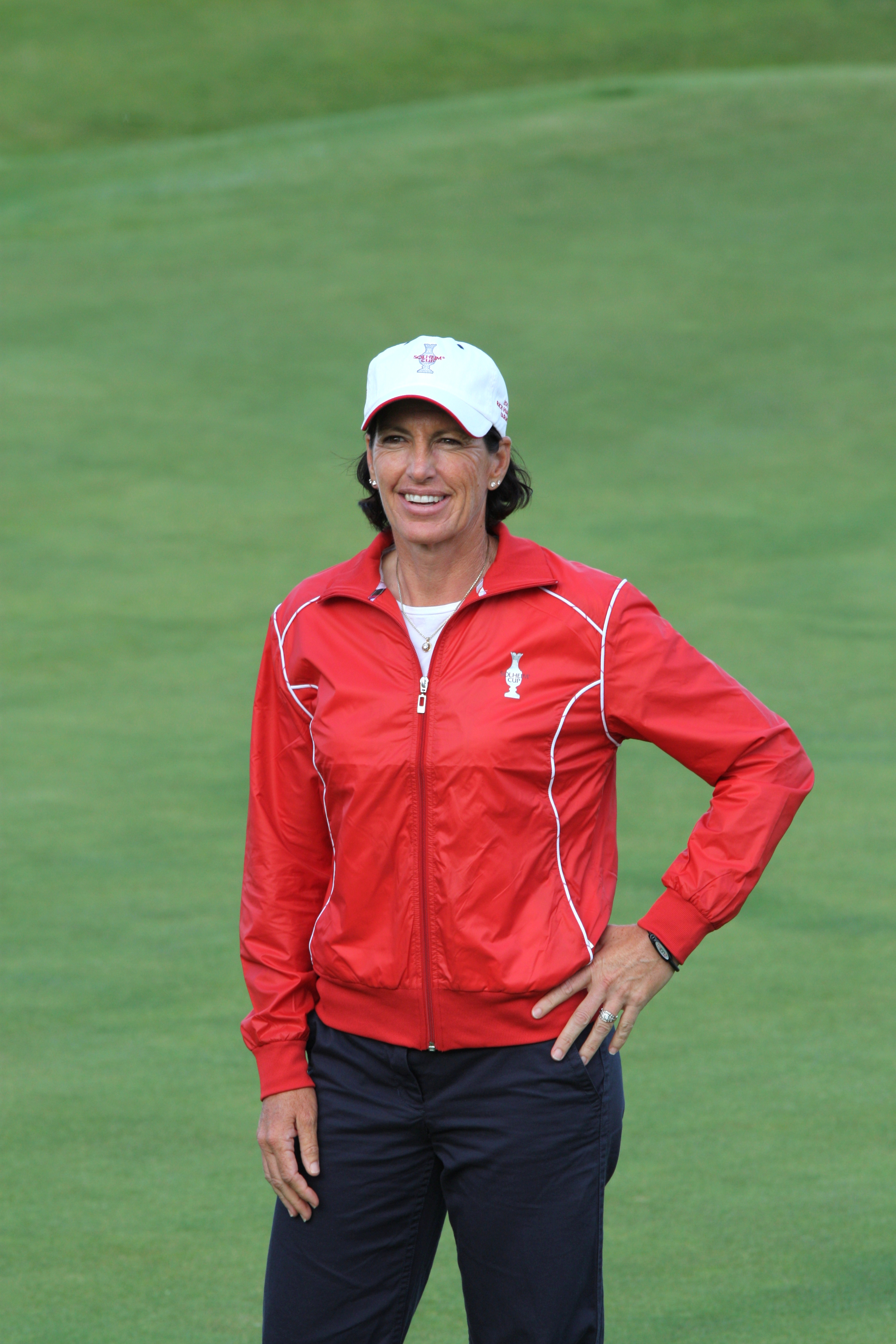
Juli Inkster won a career grand slam.

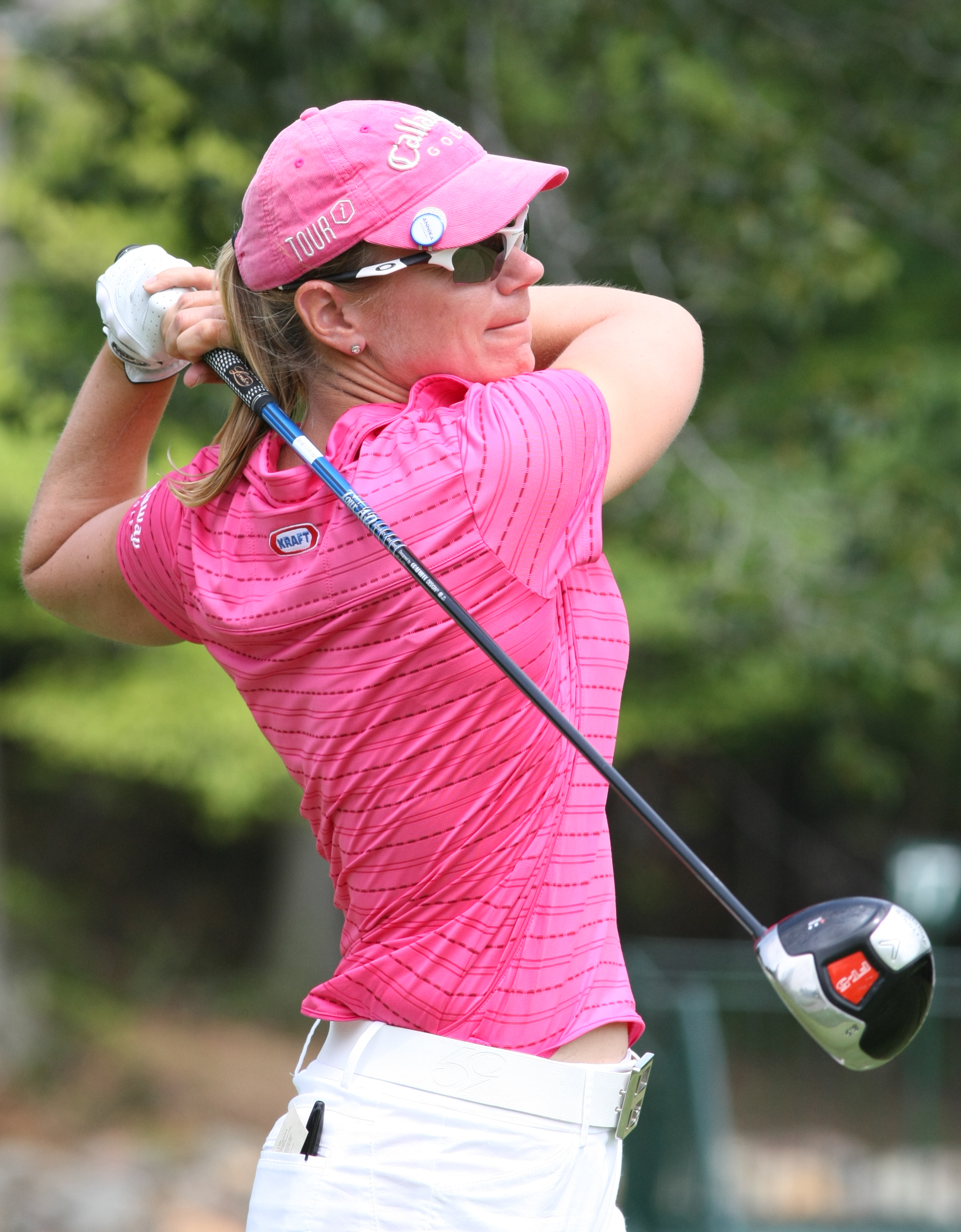
Annika Sörenstam won a career grand slam.

Women's golf also has a set of majors. No woman has completed a calendar year four-major Grand Slam, but Babe Zaharias won all three majors contested in 1950 and Sandra Haynie won both majors in 1974.

Seven women have completed the Career Grand Slam by winning four different majors. There are variations in the set of four tournaments involved as the players played in different eras, and the women's tournaments defined as "majors" have varied considerably over time in a way that has not been paralleled in the men's game. The seven are Pat Bradley, Juli Inkster, Inbee Park, Annika Sörenstam, Louise Suggs, Karrie Webb, and Mickey Wright. Webb is separately recognized by the LPGA as its only "Super Career Grand Slam" winner, for she is the only one of the group to have won five different tournaments recognized as majors.

Although other women's tours, notably the Ladies European Tour (LET) and the LPGA of Japan Tour, recognize a different set of "majors", the U.S. LPGA is so dominant in global women's golf that the phrase "women's majors", without further qualification, is almost universally considered as a reference to the U.S. LPGA majors.

The five current major championships are:

1. April—The Chevron Championship—Founded by Dinah Shore, it is most remembered for the winners taking a "lake jump" into the water surrounding the 18th green, also called the "Green Jacket of the LPGA" in reference to the ceremony held at the Masters Tournament. Similar to the Masters, it is held at the same venue every year. Originally it was hosted by Mission Hills Country Club in Rancho Mirage, California, from 1983 to 2022, followed by The Club at Carlton Woods in The Woodlands, Texas from 2023 to 2025 and presently at Memorial Park Golf Course in Houston, Texas.
2. June—The U.S. Women's Open (from 2019, ending on the first Sunday in June)—Hosted by the USGA, it is held at various golf courses around the nation. It is considered by some to be the biggest major in the LPGA circuit, despite the fact it is not sanctioned by the Ladies European Tour. It is held at various courses throughout the United States.
3. June—The KPMG Women's PGA Championship (from 2019, three weeks after the U.S. Women's Open)—hosted by the PGA of America since 2015 and played at various locations in the U.S.
4. July—The Evian Championship—an event held in France that was historically known as the Evian Masters and became the LPGA's fifth major championship in 2013. The tournament has been an LET major since its inception in 1994, and was sanctioned as a regular LPGA tour event from 2000 to 2012. Before 2019, it had been held in September.
5. August—The AIG Women's Open (week of the first Sunday of August)—It is hosted by The R&A, which absorbed the event's former operator, the Ladies' Golf Union, in late 2016. Unlike the men's Open Championship, neither the LGU nor The R&A has adopted a links-only course policy, although the event has most commonly been held on links courses in the 21st century. 2007 marked the first time it was held at what is considered by many to be the greatest golf course in the world, and certainly the most historic, the Old Course at St Andrews. In 2009, it was moved to a date three weeks after the U.S. Women's Open. The 2012 edition was held in September to avoid conflict with the 2012 Summer Olympics in London; in 2013, it returned to its then-current July/August date. Before 2013, this was the only championship sanctioned as a major by both the LPGA and the LET.

=== Women's Career Grand Slam ===
Most overall ‡

==== Super Grand Slam ====
Player	Major titles	Career slams	Chevron	LPGA	U.S. Women's Open	du Maurier	Women's Open
(Australia) Karrie Webb	7	1	2: 2000, 2006	1: 2001	2: 2000, 2001	1: 1999	1: 2002

==== Titleholders/Western Open era ====
Player	Major titles	Career slams	Women's Western	LPGA	U.S. Women's Open	Titleholders
(United States) Mickey Wright	13	2 ‡	3: 1962, 1963, 1966	4: 1958, 1960, 1961, 1963 ‡	4: 1958, 1959, 1961, 1964 ‡	2: 1961, 1962
(United States) Louise Suggs	11	1	4: 1946, 1947, 1949, 1953	1: 1957	2: 1949, 1952	4: 1946, 1954, 1956, 1959

==== du Maurier Classic era ====
Player	Major titles	Career slams	Kraft Nabisco	LPGA	U.S. Women's Open	du Maurier
(United States) Juli Inkster	7	1	2: 1984, 1989	2: 1999, 2000	2: 1999, 2002	1: 1984
(United States) Pat Bradley	6	1	1: 1986	1: 1986	1: 1981	3: 1980, 1985, 1986 ‡

==== Women's British Open Championship era ====
Player	Major titles	Career slams	Kraft Nabisco	LPGA	U.S. Women's Open	Women's Open
(Sweden) Annika Sörenstam	10	1	3: 2001, 2002, 2005 ‡	3: 2003, 2004, 2005	3: 1995, 1996, 2006	1: 2003

==== The Evian Championship Era ====
Player	Major titles	Career slams	Chevron	Women's PGA	U.S. Women's Open	Women's Open	The Evian Championship
(South Korea) Inbee Park ^{A}	7	1	1: 2013	3: 2013, 2014, 2015	2: 2008, 2013	1: 2015	–

^{A} Inbee Park is recognized as achieving the career Grand Slam for winning four different major championships, even though The Evian Championship had since been designated as the fifth major championship.

== Senior golf ==
Senior (i.e., 50 and over) men's golf also has a set of majors. Like the women's majors, the senior majors are not globally recognized. However, because the U.S.-based PGA Tour Champions overwhelmingly dominates worldwide senior golf, its roster of majors is by far the most widely recognized.

Unlike the mainstream men's and women's (until 2013) Grand Slams, the senior version (as recognized by PGA Tour Champions) now contains five events.

In the current order of play, the five majors are:

1. Senior PGA Championship
2. The Tradition
3. U.S. Senior Open
4. Senior Players Championship
5. Senior Open Championship (ending on the last Sunday in July)

The Senior PGA is by far the oldest of the senior majors, having been founded in 1937, decades before the establishment of PGA Tour Champions (as the Senior PGA Tour) in 1980. The other events were all founded in the 1980s—the U.S. Senior Open in 1980, the Senior Players Championship in 1983, The Senior Open in 1987, and The Tradition in 1989. This era saw senior golf became a commercial success as the first golf stars of the television era, such as Arnold Palmer and Gary Player, reached their fifties. The Senior Open, however, was not recognized as a U.S. senior major until 2003.

The stability of the majors in senior golf falls somewhere between mainstream men's golf and the LPGA:

- The roster of mainstream men's majors has not changed since the concept of the professional "Grand Slam" was generally recognized. The number of tournaments recognized by the LPGA as majors, as well as the identity of these events, has varied considerably over the decades. Two tournaments that were once considered as LPGA majors no longer exist, and a third lost its major status but survives as a regular tour event. In senior golf, the number of majors has changed over the years, but always by the addition of a new major.
- In terms of in-season scheduling, the senior majors have been much less stable than those of mainstream men's golf or the LPGA, especially in recent years. With the exception of a one-off staging of the PGA Championship in February 1971, the mainstream majors were held in the same order, and in almost exactly the same weeks of the year, from 1969 to 2018, after which the PGA Championship moved to the weekend before Memorial Day. In women's golf, the scheduling of the majors has stabilized in recent years, with occasional minor changes of dates but no change of order. However, in senior golf, the order of the majors has changed many times since 2006.

No man has ever won all of the senior majors contested in a year, even in the period between 1980 and 1982 when only two senior majors existed. Bernhard Langer is the only man to have won all five of the current senior majors in his career, having completed the career Slam by winning both the Senior PGA Championship and Senior Open Championship in 2017. Miller Barber won both of the 1980-1982 senior majors, the Senior PGA and U.S. Senior Open, during that time span, and won the inaugural Senior Players Championship in 1983. Those three tournaments would be the only senior majors until The Tradition was first played in 1989. Prior to the founding of The Tradition, Palmer and Player also completed that era's Career Senior Grand Slam. However, neither Barber, Palmer, nor Player would ever win The Tradition.

Jack Nicklaus is the only other player to have completed any era's Career Senior Grand Slam, doing so in his first two years on the Senior Tour. In his first year of eligibility in 1990, he won The Tradition and the Senior Players Championship. The next year, he defended his Tradition title and went on to win the Senior PGA and U.S. Senior Open. However, he failed to defend his Senior Players title and thus missed out on a calendar-year Grand Slam.

Langer and Nicklaus are the only players to have won four or more different senior majors in their careers. Although Nicklaus never won The Senior Open, that event was not recognized as a U.S. senior major until 2003, which was also the only year he played the event. Player won The Senior Open three times before 2003, when it was considered a major by the European Senior Tour but not the circuit now known as PGA Tour Champions.

=== PGA Tour Champions career Grand Slam ===
Most overall ‡

Player	Senior majors	Career Sr slams	Tradition	Senior PGA	U.S. Senior Open	Senior Players	Senior Open
(Germany) Bernhard Langer	12‡	1	2: 2016, 2017	1: 2017	2: 2010, 2023	3‡: 2014, 2015, 2016	4‡: 2010, 2014, 2017, 2019
(United States) Jack Nicklaus	8	1	4‡: 1990, 1991, 1995, 1996	1: 1991	2: 1991, 1993	1: 1990	Not recognised as a major at the time

== See also ==
- Triple Crown (golf)
- Men's major golf championships
- Chronological list of men's major golf champions
- Women's major golf championships
- List of men's major championships winning golfers
- Chronological list of LPGA major golf champions
- List of LPGA major championship winning golfers
- Grand Slam (tennis)
