= 1954 PGA Championship =

Coordinates: 45.006°N 93.056°W

Tournament information
- Dates: July 21–27, 1954
- Location: Maplewood, Minnesota, U.S.
- Course: Keller Golf Club
- Organized by: PGA of America
- Tour: PGA Tour
- Format: Match play - 6 rounds

Statistics
- Par: 71
- Length: 6,652 yards (6,083 m)
- Field: 135 players, 64 to match play
- Cut: 147 (+5), no playoff needed
- Prize fund: $20,700
- Winner's share: $5,000

Champion
- (United States) Chick Harbert
- def. Walter Burkemo, 4 and 3

Location in the United States
Location in Minnesota

The 1954 PGA Championship was the 36th PGA Championship, held July 21–27 at Keller Golf Club in Maplewood, Minnesota, a suburb north of St. Paul. Chick Harbert won the match play championship, 4 and 3 over defending champion Walter Burkemo in the Tuesday final; the winner's share was $5,000 and the runner-up's was $3,000.

It marked the second time the PGA Championship returned to a venue; public Keller had also hosted in 1932; Oakmont near Pittsburgh hosted in 1922 and 1951. It was the third and last final for the two finalists, both from the Detroit area; each had one victory and two losses. Harbert lost in 1947 and 1952, while Burkemo lost in 1951 and won in 1953.

In the finals, Burkemo eagled the first hole and was three up after four holes, but soon cooled off; the match was even on the twelfth tee and Harbert led by one at the lunch break. The afternoon round was bogey-free for both, but Harbert had five birdies to Burkemo's two and the match ended on the 33rd green.

Ed "Porky" Oliver won $250 as the medalist in the stroke-play qualifying with a 136 (−6); he fell 3 and 1 in the third round to eventual champion Harbert.

== Format ==
The match play format at the PGA Championship in 1954 called for 12 rounds (216 holes) in seven days:

- Wednesday and Thursday – 36-hole stroke play qualifier, 18 holes per day;
  - the defending champion Walter Burkemo and top 63 professionals advanced to match play
- Friday – first two rounds, 18 holes each
- Saturday – third round – 36 holes
- Sunday – quarterfinals – 36 holes
- Monday – semifinals – 36 holes
- Tuesday – final – 36 holes

== Final results ==
Tuesday, July 27, 1954

| Place | Player | Money ($) |
|---|---|---|
| 1 | (United States) Chick Harbert | 5,000 |
| 2 | (United States) Walter Burkemo | 3,000 |
| T3 | (United States) Tommy Bolt | 750 |
| T3 | (United States) Cary Middlecoff | 750 |
| T5 | (United States) Jerry Barber | 500 |
| T5 | (Argentina) Roberto De Vicenzo | 500 |
| T5 | (United States) Shelley Mayfield | 500 |
| T5 | (United States) Sam Snead | 500 |

== Results ==
=== Top half ===
Last 64; July 23
Tommy Bolt | 2&1
Mike Turnesa
Bob Kay
Art Doering | 1up
Pat Circelli
Jim Browning | 2&1
Ed Furgol | 3&2
Johnny Weitzel
Jim Milward | 2&1
Mike Homa
Tony Holguin
Sam Snead | 1up
Johnny Palmer | 3&2
Labron Harris
Jack Burke Jr.
Dutch Harrison | 1up
Joe Greer
Bill Trombley | 3&2
Toney Penna
Charlie Bassler | 3&1
Jerry Barber | 2&1
Bob Gajda
Fred Haas | 19h
Lou Barbaro
Chick Harbert | 5&3
Mike Krak
Phil Friel
John O'Donnell | 3&2
Clarence Doser
Bill Nary | 3&1
Ed Oliver | 4&3
Jackson Bradley

Last 32; July 23
Tommy Bolt | 2&1
Art Doering
Jim Browning | 1up
Ed Furgol
Jim Milward
Sam Snead | 4&3
Johnny Palmer
Dutch Harrison | 4&3
Bill Trombley
Charlie Bassler | 5&4
Jerry Barber | 19h
Fred Haas
Chick Harbert | 3&1
John O'Donnell
Bill Nary
Ed Oliver | 1up

Last 16; July 24
Tommy Bolt | 2&1
Jim Browning
Sam Snead | 7&6
Dutch Harrison
Charlie Bassler
Jerry Barber | 38h
Chick Harbert | 3&1
Ed Oliver

Quarter-finals; July 25
Tommy Bolt | 39h
Sam Snead
Jerry Barber
Chick Harbert | 1up

Semi-finals; July 26
Tommy Bolt
Chick Harbert | 1up

=== Bottom half ===
Last 64; July 23
Walter Burkemo | 4&2
Dave Douglas
Claude Harmon | 6&5
Eric Monti
Johnny Revolta | 3&2
Ellsworth Vines
Jimmy Clark
Toby Lyons | 1up
Roberto De Vicenzo | 5&4
Gene Webb
Henry Ransom | 2&1
Herman Keiser
Marty Furgol
Elroy Marti | 4&3
Frank Commisso
Henry Williams Jr. | 3&2
Cary Middlecoff | 1up
Joe Brown
Bob Toski | 5&4
Jim Turnesa
Ted Kroll | 3&2
Leonard Wagner
Orville White
Max Evans | 2&1
Shelley Mayfield | 4&3
Jimmy Hines
Wally Ulrich | 2&1
Pat Abbott
Jimmy Scott
Horton Smith | 5&4
Milon Marusic
Jack Isaacs | 3&2

Last 32; July 23
Walter Burkemo | 2&1
Claude Harmon
Johnny Revolta | 5&4
Toby Lyons
Roberto De Vicenzo | 4&3
Henry Ransom
Elroy Marti | 2up
Henry Williams Jr.
Cary Middlecoff | 2&1
Bob Toski
Ted Kroll | 24h
Max Evans
Shelley Mayfield | 5&4
Wally Ulrich
Horton Smith | 3&2
Jack Isaacs

Last 16; July 24
Walter Burkemo | 4&3
Johnny Revolta
Roberto De Vicenzo | 8&6
Elroy Marti
Cary Middlecoff | 5&4
Ted Kroll
Shelley Mayfield | 3&2
Horton Smith

Quarter-finals; July 25
Walter Burkemo | 5&4
Roberto De Vicenzo
Cary Middlecoff | 3&1
Shelley Mayfield

Semi-finals; July 26
Walter Burkemo | 37h
Cary Middlecoff

=== Final ===
July 27, Morning

| Hole | 1 | 2 | 3 | 4 | 5 | 6 | 7 | 8 | 9 | 10 | 11 | 12 | 13 | 14 | 15 | 16 | 17 | 18 |
|---|---|---|---|---|---|---|---|---|---|---|---|---|---|---|---|---|---|---|
| Par | 4 | 4 | 5 | 3 | 4 | 3 | 5 | 4 | 4 | 4 | 4 | 5 | 3 | 4 | 3 | 4 | 4 | 4 |
| (United States) Harbert | ^ | 4 | 7 | 3 | 4 | 3 | 4 | 4 | 3 | 4 | 4 | 5 | 3 | 4 | 3 | 4 | 3 | 4 |
| (United States) Burkemo | 2 | 4 | 5 | 2 | 4 | 3 | 4 | 4 | 4 | 5 | 5 | 5 | 3 | 5 | 3 | 4 | 3 | 4 |
| Leader | B1 | B1 | B2 | B3 | B3 | B3 | B3 | B3 | B2 | B1 | – | – | – | H1 | H1 | H1 | H1 | H1 |

^ = picked up ball (hole concession)

Afternoon

| Hole | 1 | 2 | 3 | 4 | 5 | 6 | 7 | 8 | 9 | 10 | 11 | 12 | 13 | 14 | 15 | 16 | 17 | 18 |
|---|---|---|---|---|---|---|---|---|---|---|---|---|---|---|---|---|---|---|
| Par | 4 | 4 | 5 | 3 | 4 | 3 | 5 | 4 | 4 | 4 | 4 | 5 | 3 | 4 | 3 | 4 | 4 | 4 |
| (United States) Harbert | 3 | 3 | 5 | 3 | 4 | 3 | 5 | 4 | 4 | 3 | 4 | 4 | 3 | 3 | 3 | Harbert wins 4 and 3 | | |
| (United States) Burkemo | 4 | 4 | 5 | 3 | 4 | 3 | 4 | 4 | 4 | 4 | 4 | 4 | 3 | 4 | 3 | Harbert wins 4 and 3 | | |
| Leader | H2 | H3 | H3 | H3 | H3 | H3 | H2 | H2 | H2 | H3 | H3 | H3 | H3 | H4 | H4 | Harbert wins 4 and 3 | | |

| Eagle | Birdie | Bogey | Double bogey |
