= Moraine Country Club =

Country club in Kettering, Ohio

- Interactive map of Moraine Country Club
- 39°41′15″N 84°11′53″W

Club information
- Location: Kettering, Ohio
- Established: 1930
- Type: Private
- Tota holes: 18
- Tournaments: 1945 PGA Championship
- Greens: Bent grass
- Fairways: Bent grass
- Website: www.MoraineCountryClub.com
- Designed by: Alec Campbell
- Par: 72
- Length: 7128
- Course rating: 72.6
- Slope rating: 131

Moraine Country Club is a country club located in Kettering, Ohio, in the Dayton Metropolitan Area. The development of the Moraine Country Club started at a meeting in 1927, when Colonel Deeds, Charles Kettering, Frederick Rike, Governor James Cox, Robert Patterson, John Haswell & William Keyes decided to turn a portion of "Moraine Farm" into a golf course. Alec Campbell designed the course and in 1930 the club was incorporated. As of 2025, the golf course is ranked in 7th position in the top courses in the state of Ohio by Golf Digest.

The golf course hosted the PGA Championship in 1945 which Byron Nelson won.

In 2016, the course underwent a $5,000,000 renovation to bring the Alec Campbell designed course back to its original design. In 2024, the course hosted the Western Amateur tournament.

== Scorecard ==
Moraine Country Club
Tee	Rating/Slope	1	2	3	4	5	6	7	8	9	Out	10	11	12	13	14	15	16	17	18	In	Total
Black	75.3/137	414	220	421	534	155	360	326	639	471	3540	449	437	242	610	449	162	410	470	477	3706	7246
Blue	M:72.7/131 W:78.2/142	370	204	413	520	137	326	308	548	418	3244	428	389	206	564	399	157	382	465	445	3435	6679
White	M:71.1/129 W:76.5/137	360	191	364	507	127	316	295	536	408	3104	419	379	171	537	365	151	371	442	430	3265	6369
Green	M:67.0/122 W:71.5/127	323	163	286	465	111	271	253	430	371	2673	367	322	149	423	311	143	327	403	349	2794	5467
SI	Men's	8	6	4	2	18	16	14	12	10		3	11	13	5	1	15	9	17	7
Par		4	3	4	5	3	4	4	5	4	36	4	4	3	5	4	3	4	5	4	36	72
SI	Women's	5	9	3	1	15	17	7	11	13		6	10	18	4	2	16	8	12	14
