= Chick Harbert =

American professional golfer (1915–1992)

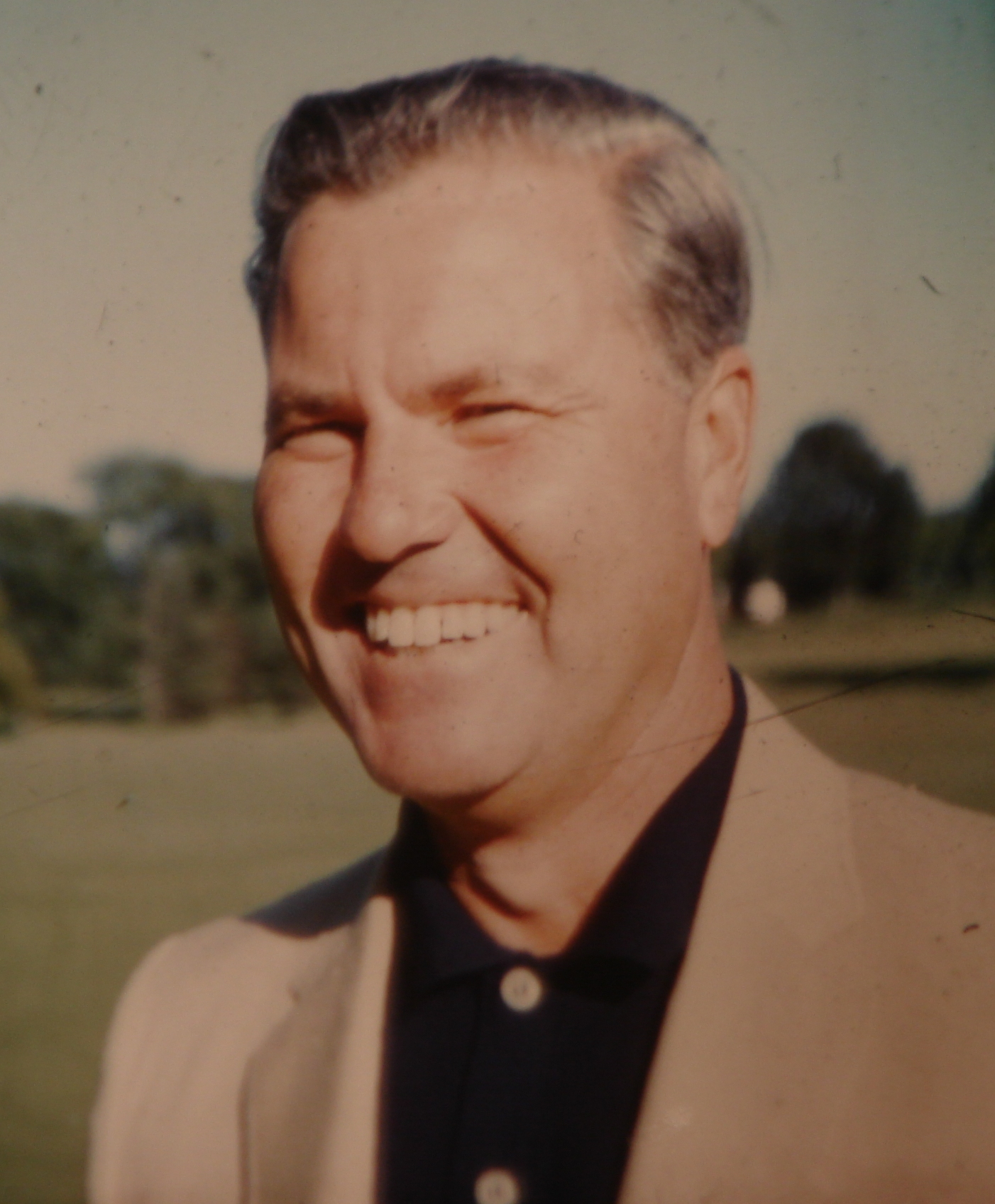
- Harbert in 1959

Personal information
- Full name: Melvin R. Harbert
- Nickname: Chick
- Nationality: United States
- Born: February 20, 1915 Dayton, Ohio, U.S.
- Died: September 1, 1992 (aged 77) Ocala, Florida, U.S.
- Height: 6 ft 0 in (1.83 m)
- Weight: 175 lb (79 kg; 12.5 st)
- Spouse: Jeanne

Career
- Sport: Golf
- Turned professional: 1940
- Former tour: PGA Tour
- Professional wins: 19

Number of wins by tour
- PGA Tour: 6
- Other: 13

Best results in major championships (wins: 1)
- Masters Tournament: 3rd: 1948
- PGA Championship: Won: 1954
- U.S. Open: T8: 1946, 1957
- The Open Championship: DNP

Melvin R. "Chick" Harbert (February 20, 1915 – September 1, 1992) was an American professional golfer.

== Early life ==
Harbert was born in Dayton, Ohio, and served in the U.S. Army Air Forces during World War II.

== Professional career ==
Harbert won seven times on the PGA Tour, including one major championship, the 1954 PGA Championship, then a match play event. A three-time finalist, he was also that event's runner-up twice, in 1947 (falling to Jim Ferrier) and 1952 (to Jim Turnesa). Harbert was one of the great PGA Championship match play competitors, compiling a 24–10 (.706) record between 1946, his first appearance, and 1957, the final year of the match play format.

In 1949, Harbert played on the Ryder Cup team, winning his singles match against Sam King, 4 and 3, at Ganton Golf Club in Scarborough, England. He was playing-captain of the U.S. team in 1955, with a singles victory against Syd Scott (3 and 2) to his credit.

In 1955, he represented the United States at the Canada Cup team competition at Columbia Country Club outside Washington, D.C. He teamed with Ed Furgol, with the duo outdueling Australia's team of Peter Thomson and Kel Nagle by nine strokes. He finished fourth in the individual competition, two strokes out of the Furgol, Thomson and Flory Van Donck playoff that Furgol won.

After turning 50, he made two official Senior PGA Tour appearances. He tied for 43rd at the 1981 Michelob Senior Classic and then tied for 40th in the same tournament the following year. In addition, he played in nine Liberty Mutual Legends of Golf team events, with his top showing a fifth-place performance in the inaugural event in 1978, when he teamed with Bob Toski.

== Personal life ==
He died of a cerebral hemorrhage at age 77 at his home in Ocala, Florida.

== Amateur wins ==
this list may be incomplete

- 1939 Trans-Mississippi Amateur

== Professional wins (19) ==
=== PGA Tour wins (6) ===
- 1941 (1) Beaumont Open-Texas
- 1942 (2) Texas Open, St. Paul Open
- 1948 (2) Jacksonville Open, Charlotte Open
- 1954 (1) **PGA Championship**

Major championship is shown in bold.

=== Other wins (13) ===
this list is probably incomplete

- 1937 Michigan Open (as an amateur)
- 1942 Michigan Open
- 1946 Michigan PGA Championship
- 1947 Michigan PGA Championship
- 1948 Michigan Open
- 1949 Inverness Invitational Four-Ball (with Bob Hamilton), Michigan PGA Championship
- 1950 Michigan PGA Championship
- 1953 Michigan Open, Michigan PGA Championship
- 1954 Canada Cup (with Ed Furgol)
- 1957 Puerto Rico Open
- 1959 Michigan PGA Championship

== Major championships ==
=== Wins (1) ===
Year	Championship	Winning score	Runner-up
1954	PGA Championship	4 & 3	(United States) Walter Burkemo

Note: The PGA Championship was match play until 1958

=== Results timeline ===
Tournament	1935	1936	1937	1938	1939
Masters Tournament					T18 LA
U.S. Open	CUT				CUT
PGA Championship					

Tournament	1940	1941	1942	1943	1944	1945	1946	1947	1948	1949
Masters Tournament	T33		T10	NT	NT	NT	T7	T34	3	WD
U.S. Open	CUT	CUT	NT	NT	NT	NT	T8	12	T28	T23
PGA Championship				NT			R64	2	QF	

Tournament	1950	1951	1952	1953	1954	1955	1956	1957	1958	1959
Masters Tournament	T24	T44		T5	T12	T32	T40	CUT	T17	T14
U.S. Open		CUT	T24	T42		T34	CUT	T8	T52	T26
PGA Championship	R16	R32	2	R64	**1**	R32	R32	R128	CUT	T28

Tournament	1960	1961	1962	1963	1964	1965	1966	1967	1968	1969
Masters Tournament	T39	35	43	CUT	CUT					
U.S. Open	T31	T29		CUT	T50		CUT	CUT		
PGA Championship	T32	T52	T11	CUT	T44	CUT	CUT	T67		

Tournament	1970	1971	1972	1973
Masters Tournament				
U.S. Open				
PGA Championship				WD

Note: Harbert never played in The Open Championship.

Win
Top 10
Did not play

LA = low amateur
NT = no tournament
WD = withdrew
CUT = missed the half-way cut (3rd round cut in 1958 PGA Championship)
R128, R64, R32, R16, QF, SF = round in which player lost in PGA Championship match play
"T" indicates a tie for a place

=== Summary ===
Tournament	Wins	2nd	3rd	Top-5	Top-10	Top-25	Events	Cuts made
Masters Tournament	0	0	1	2	4	9	21	17
U.S. Open	0	0	0	0	2	5	22	13
The Open Championship	0	0	0	0	0	0	0	0
PGA Championship	1	2	0	4	5	9	22	17
Totals	1	2	1	6	11	23	65	47

- Most consecutive cuts made – 12 (1951 PGA – 1956 Masters)
- Longest streak of top-10s – 3 (1942 Masters – 1946 U.S. Open)

== U.S. national team appearances ==
Professional

- Ryder Cup: 1949 (winners), 1955 (winners, playing captain)
- Canada Cup: 1955 (winners)
- Hopkins Trophy: 1955 (winners)

== See also ==
- List of men's major championships winning golfers
