= 1953 Open Championship =

Coordinates: 56.497°N 2.717°W

Tournament information
- Dates: 8–10 July 1953
- Location: Carnoustie, Angus, Scotland
- Course(s): Carnoustie Golf Links; Championship Course

Statistics
- Par: 72
- Length: 7,200 yards (6,584 m)
- Field: 91 players, 49 after cut
- Cut: 154 (+10)
- Prize fund: £2,500 $7,000
- Winner's share: £500 $1,400

Champion
- (United States) Ben Hogan
- 282 (−6)

Location in Scotland
Location in Angus, Scotland

The 1953 Open Championship was the 82nd Open Championship, held 8–10 July at the Carnoustie Golf Links in Carnoustie, Angus, Scotland. In his only Open Championship appearance, Ben Hogan prevailed by four strokes over four runners-up to win his third major championship of the year.

The total prize money was increased by nearly fifty per cent, from £1,700 to £2,500. The winner received £500, with £300 for second, £200 for third, £100 for fourth, £75 for fifth, £30 for next 20, and then £25 each for the remaining players. There was also a £15 prize for winning the qualification event and four £15 prizes for the lowest score in each round. The purse of £2,500 ($7,000) and the winner's share of £500 ($1,400), were less than one-third that of the U.S. Open or PGA Championship in 1953.

Qualifying took place on 6–7 July, Monday and Tuesday, with 18 holes each on the Championship and Burnside courses. The number of qualifiers was limited to a maximum of 100, and ties for 100th place would not qualify. On Monday, John Panton led the qualifiers on the Championship course after a 69 while Bobby Locke scored 65 on the Burnside course. Locke's scored 71 on the second day and a total of 136 put him five shots ahead of the rest. Panton and Christy O'Connor were next on 141, and Hogan qualified comfortably on 145. Peter Thomson, the 1952 runner-up, only just qualified on 154 after taking 80 on the Championship course. The qualifying score was 154 and 91 players advanced.

Hogan, with the Masters and U.S. Open titles, made the trip across the Atlantic for the Open Championship for the only time in his career. He arrived at Carnoustie two weeks early to practice with the smaller British golf ball.

The policy of requiring all players to qualify, the small purse, the lengthy ocean voyage, and the conflict of schedule with the PGA Championship kept all but a few Americans at home; only four qualified for the first round on Wednesday, and three made the 36-hole cut to play the final two rounds on Friday. A maximum of 50 players could make the cut after 36 holes, and ties for 50th place were not included; it was at 154 (+10) and 49 advanced to the final two rounds.

Although the field of 91 that qualified was mostly British, a strong international contingent stood ready to challenge Hogan, including fellow Americans Lloyd Mangrum and Frank Stranahan, Thomson of Australia, Antonio Cerdá and Roberto De Vicenzo of Argentina, and Locke of South Africa, the defending champion.

The Open Championship was Hogan's third major title of the year, but the modern Grand Slam was not possible, as the PGA Championship conflicted with the Open in 1953; the final match (36 holes) of the seven-day PGA Championship was played near Detroit on Tuesday, 7 July. After his automobile accident in 1949, Hogan did not enter the PGA Championship until 1960, after it became a stroke play event. He had won the PGA Championship in 1946 and 1948 before the accident.

Hogan did not play in another Open Championship, although he did make a lasting impression on Carnoustie. The par-5 6th hole features a split fairway, with the right side being safer but the left offering a better angle to the green. Hogan found the narrow left side in each of the four rounds, and that hole is now known as "Hogan's Alley."

Hogan remains the only player to win the Masters, U.S. Open, and Open Championship in the same calendar year. After winning the first two majors of the year, Arnold Palmer (1960) and Jack Nicklaus (1972) were runners-up by a stroke. Tiger Woods won the Masters and U.S. Open in 2002, but shot 81-65 on the weekend to finish six strokes back at Muirfield, tied for 28th place. Jordan Spieth won the Masters and U.S. Open in 2015. At St. Andrews in 2015 he bogeyed the 71st hole (Road) and missed a three-man playoff by one stroke.

After the win, Hogan and his wife Valerie were passengers on the SS United States westbound to New York City, where he received a ticker tape parade down Broadway on July 21.

== Course ==
Championship Course

Hole	Name	Yards	Par	Hole	Name	Yards	Par
1	Cup	406	4	10	South America	446	4
2	Gulley	442	4	11	Dyke	368	4
3	Jockie's Burn	346	4	12	Southward Ho	467	4
4	Hillocks	430	4	13	Whins	169	3
5	Brae	388	4	14	Spectacles	473	5
6	Long ^	567	5	15	Lucky Slap	457	4
7	Plantation	389	4	16	Barry Burn	250	3
8	Short	162	3	17	Island	454	4
9	Railway	483	4	18	Home	503	5
Out		3,613	36	In		3,587	36
Source:				Total		7,200	72

^ The 6th hole was renamed Hogan's Alley in 2003

== Round summaries ==
=== First round ===
Wednesday, 8 July 1953

Stranahan set the early pace with a first round of 70, with Eric Brown in 2nd with a 71. Locke shot 72 and joined Dai Rees, Thomson, and De Vicenzo in 3rd. Dealing with putting problems, Hogan had to settle for an opening round of 73.

Place	Player	Score	To par
1	(United States) Frank Stranahan (a)	70	−2
2	(Scotland) Eric Brown	71	−1
T3	(Argentina) Roberto De Vicenzo	72	E
T3	(South Africa) Bobby Locke	72	E
T3	(Wales) Dai Rees	72	E
T3	(Australia) Peter Thomson	72	E
T7	(Northern Ireland) Fred Daly	73	+1
T7	(United States) Ben Hogan	73	+1
T9	(England) Tom Fairbairn	74	+2
T9	(England) Max Faulkner	74	+2
T9	(England) Geoffrey Hunt	74	+2
T9	(England) Sam King	74	+2
T9	(England) Reg Knight	74	+2
T9	(England) Syd Scott	74	+2

=== Second round ===
Thursday, 9 July 1953

Hogan's problems on the green continued in the second round, but he managed to better his score with a 71. Rees finished the round birdie-eagle to card a 70, giving him a share of the lead with Brown. De Vicenzo was in 3rd, with Hogan, Stranahan, and Thomson a shot further back. Stranahan was the sole amateur to make the cut.

Place	Player	Score	To par
T1	(Scotland) Eric Brown	71-71=142	−2
T1	(Wales) Dai Rees	72-70=142	−2
3	(Argentina) Roberto De Vicenzo	72-71=143	−1
T4	(United States) Ben Hogan	73-71=144	E
T4	(United States) Frank Stranahan (a)	70-74=144	E
T4	(Australia) Peter Thomson	72-72=144	E
T7	(England) Tommy Fairbairn	74-71=145	+1
T7	(England) Max Faulkner	74-71=145	+1
T7	(South Africa) Bobby Locke	72-73=145	+1
10	(Argentina) Antonio Cerdá	75-71=146	+2

=== Third round ===
Friday, 10 July 1953 (morning)

In the third round, Cerdá set a new course record with a round of 69. Thomson shot 71 to join Cerdá and Rees in 3rd. Hogan was having an excellent round until he found trouble on the 17th, but he managed to get up-and-down from a bunker and salvage a 6. He birdied the 18th to card a 70 for a share of the lead with De Vicenzo.

Place	Player	Score	To par
T1	(Argentina) Roberto De Vicenzo	72-71-71=214	−2
T1	(United States) Ben Hogan	73-71-70=214	−2
T3	(Argentina) Antonio Cerdá	75-71-69=215	−1
T3	(Wales) Dai Rees	72-70-73=215	−1
T3	(Australia) Peter Thomson	72-72-71=215	−1
T6	(Scotland) Eric Brown	71-71-75=217	+1
T6	(United States) Frank Stranahan (a)	70-74-73=217	+1
T8	(England) Tommy Fairbairn	74-71-73=218	+2
T8	(England) Max Faulkner	74-71-73=218	+2
T10	(England) Sam King	74-73-72=219	+3
T10	(South Africa) Bobby Locke	72-73-74=219	+3

=== Final round ===
Friday, 10 July 1953 (afternoon)

In the final round, Stranahan was out first and posted a 69 and 286 total, including an eagle at the last. De Vicenzo was unable to recover after hitting his ball out of bounds at the 9th and finished at 287. Hogan chipped-in for birdie at the 5th, then followed with another birdie at 6. He opened up a two-shot lead at the 13th, saved par at the 17th, then made another birdie at 18. Battling the flu, he finished with a round of 68 to better the record that Cerdá had set that morning. His total of 282 was four shots clear of the field.

Place	Player	Score	To par	Money (£)
1	(United States) Ben Hogan	73-71-70-68=282	−6	515
T2	(Argentina) Antonio Cerdá	75-71-69-71=286	−2	215
T2	(Wales) Dai Rees	72-70-73-71=286	−2	215
T2	(United States) Frank Stranahan (a)	70-74-73-69=286	−2	0
T2	(Australia) Peter Thomson	72-72-71-71=286	−2	200
6	(Argentina) Roberto De Vicenzo	72-71-71-73=287	−1	75
7	(England) Sam King	74-73-72-71=290	+2	30
8	(South Africa) Bobby Locke	72-73-74-72=291	+3	45
T9	(England) Peter Alliss	75-72-74-71=292	+4	30
T9	(Scotland) Eric Brown	71-71-75-75=292	+4	30

Source: Amateurs: Stranahan (−2)
