= PGA Championship =

Golf tournament in the United States

Tournament information
- Location: multiple
- Established: 1916
- Course: multiple
- Organized by: PGA of America
- Tours: PGA Tour; European Tour; Japan Golf Tour
- Format: Stroke play (1958–present); Match play (1916–1957)
- Prize fund: US$20,500,000
- Month played: May (formerly August)
- Website: pgachampionship.com

Tournament record score
- Aggregate: 263 (Note: Scoring record for all major championships.) Xander Schauffele (2024)
- To par: −21 Xander Schauffele (2024)

Current champion
- (England) Aaron Rai

Current tournament
- 2026 PGA Championship

The PGA Championship (often referred to as the US PGA Championship or USPGA outside the United States) is an annual golf tournament conducted by the Professional Golfers' Association of America. The PGA is one of the four men's major golf championships (the others being The Open, the Masters, and the U.S. Open) and is the only one of the four that is exclusively for professional players.

It was formerly played in mid-August on the third weekend before Labor Day weekend, serving as the fourth and final men's major of the golf season. Beginning in 2019, the tournament is played in May on the weekend before Memorial Day, as the season's second major following the Masters in April. It is an official money event on the PGA Tour, European Tour, and Japan Golf Tour, with a purse of $11 million for the 100th edition in 2018.

In line with the other majors, winning the PGA gains privileges that improve career security. PGA champions are automatically invited to play in the other three majors and The Players Championship for the next five years, and are eligible for the PGA Championship for life. They also earn a five-year exemption on the PGA Tour and a seven-year membership on the DP World Tour.

The PGA Championship has been held at various venues. Some of the early sites are now quite obscure, but in recent years, the event has generally been played at a small group of celebrated courses.

== History ==
In 1894, with 41 golf courses operating in the United States, two unofficial national championships for amateur golfers were organized. One was held at Newport Country Club in Rhode Island, and the other at Saint Andrew's Golf Club in New York. In addition, and at the same time as the amateur event, Saint Andrew's conducted an Open championship for professional golfers. None of the championships were officially sanctioned by a governing body for American golf, causing considerable controversy among players and organizers. Later in 1894 this led to the formation of the United States Golf Association (USGA), which became the first formal golf organization in the country. After the formation of the USGA, golf quickly became a sport of national popularity and importance.

In February 1916, the Professional Golfers Association of America (PGA) was established in New York City. One month earlier, the wealthy department store owner Rodman Wanamaker hosted a luncheon with the leading golf professionals of the day at the Wykagyl Country Club in nearby New Rochelle. The attendees prepared the agenda for the formal organization of the PGA; consequently, golf historians have dubbed Wykagyl "The Cradle of the PGA." The new organization's first president was Robert White, one of Wykagyl's best-known golf professionals.

The first PGA Championship was held in October 1916 at Siwanoy Country Club in Bronxville, New York. The winner, Jim Barnes, received $500 and a diamond-studded gold medal donated by Rodman Wanamaker. The 2016 winner, Jimmy Walker, earned $1.8 million. The champion is also awarded a replica of the Wanamaker Trophy, which was also donated by Wanamaker, to keep for one year, and a smaller-sized keeper replica Wanamaker Trophy.

=== Format ===
The PGA Championship was originally a match play event in the early fall, but it varied from May to December. After World War II, the championship was usually in late May or late June, then moved to early July in 1953 and a few weeks later in 1954, with the finals played on Tuesday. As a match play event (with a stroke play qualifier), it was not uncommon for the finalists to play over 200 holes in seven days. The 1957 event lost money, and at the PGA meetings in November it was changed to stroke play, starting in 1958, with the standard 72-hole format of 18 holes per day for four days, Thursday to Sunday. Network television broadcasters, preferring a large group of well-known contenders on the final day, pressured the PGA of America to make the format change.

During the 1960s, the PGA Championship was played the week after The Open Championship five times, making it virtually impossible for players to compete in both majors. In 1965, the PGA was contested for the first time in August, and returned in 1969, save for a one-year move to late February in 1971, played in Florida. The 2016 event was moved to late July, two weeks after the Open Championship, to accommodate the 2016 Summer Olympics in August.

Before the 2017 edition, it was announced that the PGA Championship would be moved to May on the weekend before Memorial Day, beginning in 2019. The PGA Tour concurrently announced that it would move its Players Championship back to March the same year; it had been moved from March to May in 2007. The PGA of America cited the addition of golf to the Summer Olympics, as well as cooler weather enabling a wider array of options for host courses, as reasoning for the change. It was also believed that the PGA Tour wished to re-align its season so that the FedEx Cup Playoffs would not have to compete with the start of football season in late-August.

=== Location ===
The PGA Championship has normally been played in the eastern half of the United States except eleven times, most recently in 2020 at TPC Harding Park in San Francisco. It was the first for the Bay Area, returning to California after a quarter century. Prior to 2020, it was last played in the Pacific time zone in 1998, at Sahalee east of Seattle. (The Mountain time zone has hosted three editions, all in suburban Denver, in 1941, 1967, and 1985.) The 103rd PGA Championship was held at the Kiawah Island Golf Resort's Ocean Course in Kiawah Island, South Carolina, and the 104th was held at Southern Hills Country Club in Tulsa, Oklahoma.

The state of New York has hosted the championship thirteen times, followed by Ohio (11) and Pennsylvania (9).

=== Promotion ===
The tournament was previously promoted with the slogan "Glory's Last Shot". In 2013, the tagline was dropped in favor of "The Season's Final Major", as suggested by PGA Tour commissioner Tim Finchem while discussing the allowance of a one-week break in its schedule before the Ryder Cup. Finchem had argued that the slogan was not appropriate as it weakened the stature of events that occur after it, such as the PGA Tour's FedEx Cup playoffs. PGA of America CEO Pete Bevacqua explained that they had also had discussions with CBS, adding that "it was three entities that all quickly came to the same conclusion that, you know what, there's just not much in that tag line and we don't feel it's doing much for the PGA Championship, so let's not stick with it. Let's think what else is out there." For a time, the tournament used the slogan "This is Major" as a replacement.

== Trophy ==
The Wanamaker Trophy, named after businessman, golfer, and PGA of America founder Rodman Wanamaker, stands nearly 2.5 feet (75 cm) tall and weighs 27 pounds (12 kg). The trophy was lost, briefly, for a few years until it showed up in 1930 in the cellar of L.A. Young and Company. Ironically, this cellar was in the factory which made the clubs for the man responsible for losing it, Walter Hagen. Hagen claimed to have trusted a taxi driver with the precious cargo, but it never returned to his hotel. There is a smaller replica trophy that the champion gets to keep permanently, but the original must be returned for the following years tournament.

== Qualification ==
The PGA Championship was established for the purpose of providing a high-profile tournament specifically for professional golfers at a time when they were generally not held in high esteem in a sport that was largely run by wealthy amateurs. This origin is still reflected in the entry system for the Championship. It is the only major that does not explicitly invite leading amateurs to compete (it is possible for amateurs to get into the field, although the only viable ways are by winning one of the other major championships, or winning a PGA Tour event while playing on a sponsor's exemption), and the only one that reserves so many places, 20 of 156, for club professionals. These slots are determined by the top finishers in the PGA Professional Championship, which is held in late April.

Since December 1968, the PGA Tour has been independent of the PGA of America.

The PGA Tour is an elite organization of tournament professionals, but the PGA Championship is still run by the PGA of America, which is mainly a body for club and teaching professionals. The PGA Championship is the only major that does not explicitly grant entry to the top 50 players in the Official World Golf Ranking, although special exemptions are commonly given to players in the top 100 (not just top 50) of the ranking who are not already qualified.

As of 2023, the qualification criteria are as follows:

- Former PGA Champions.
- Winners of the last five U.S. Opens.
- Winners of the last five Masters.
- Winners of the last five Open Championships.
- Winners of the last three The Players Championships.
- Top 3 on the Official World Golf Ranking International Federation Ranking List (criterion added in 2023).
- The current Senior PGA Champion.
- The low 15 scorers and ties in the previous PGA Championship.
- The 20 low scorers in the last PGA Professional Championship.
- The 70 leaders in PGA Championship points list (based on official money earned on the PGA Tour since the previous PGA Championship).
- Members of the most recent United States and European Ryder Cup Teams who are ranked the top 100 of the Official World Golf Ranking as of one week before the start of the tournament.
- Any tournament winner co-sponsored or approved by the PGA Tour since the previous PGA Championship .
- The PGA of America reserves the right to invite additional players not included in the categories listed above.
- The total field is a maximum of 156 players. Vacancies are filled by the first available player from the list of alternates (those below 70th place in official money standings).

== Winners ==
=== Stroke play era winners ===
Year	Winner	Score	To par	Margin of victory	Runner(s)-up	Winner's share ($)	Venue	Location
2026	(England) Aaron Rai	271	−9	3 strokes	(Spain) Jon Rahm (United States) Alex Smalley	3,690,000	Aronimink Golf Club	Newtown Square, Pennsylvania
2025	(United States) Scottie Scheffler	273	−11	5 strokes	(United States) Bryson DeChambeau (United States) Harris English (United States) Davis Riley	3,420,000	Quail Hollow Club	Charlotte, North Carolina
2024	(United States) Xander Schauffele	263	−21	1 stroke	(United States) Bryson DeChambeau	3,330,000	Valhalla Golf Club	Louisville, Kentucky
2023	(United States) Brooks Koepka (3)	271	−9	2 strokes	(Norway) Viktor Hovland (United States) Scottie Scheffler	3,150,000	Oak Hill Country Club (East Course)	Rochester, New York (Note: The club has a Rochester postal address, but is located in the adjacent town of Pittsford.)
2022	(United States) Justin Thomas (2)	275	−5	Playoff	(United States) Will Zalatoris	2,700,000	Southern Hills Country Club	Tulsa, Oklahoma
2021	(United States) Phil Mickelson (2)	282	−6	2 strokes	(United States) Brooks Koepka (South Africa) Louis Oosthuizen	2,160,000	Kiawah Island Golf Resort (Ocean Course)	Kiawah Island, South Carolina
2020	(United States) Collin Morikawa	267	−13	2 strokes	(England) Paul Casey (United States) Dustin Johnson	1,980,000	TPC Harding Park	San Francisco, California
2019	(United States) Brooks Koepka (2)	272	−8	2 strokes	(United States) Dustin Johnson	1,980,000	Bethpage State Park (Black Course)	Farmingdale, New York
2018	(United States) Brooks Koepka	264	−16	2 strokes	(United States) Tiger Woods	1,980,000	Bellerive Country Club	Town and Country, Missouri
2017	(United States) Justin Thomas	276	−8	2 strokes	(Italy) Francesco Molinari (South Africa) Louis Oosthuizen (United States) Patrick Reed	1,890,000	Quail Hollow Club	Charlotte, North Carolina
2016	(United States) Jimmy Walker	266	−14	1 stroke	(Australia) Jason Day	1,800,000	Baltusrol Golf Club (Lower Course)	Springfield, New Jersey
2015	(Australia) Jason Day	268	−20	3 strokes	(United States) Jordan Spieth	1,800,000	Whistling Straits (Straits Course)	Kohler, Wisconsin (Note: The course has a Kohler postal address, but is located in the unincorporated community of Haven.)
2014	(Northern Ireland) Rory McIlroy (2)	268	−16	1 stroke	(United States) Phil Mickelson	1,800,000	Valhalla Golf Club	Louisville, Kentucky
2013	(United States) Jason Dufner	270	−10	2 strokes	(United States) Jim Furyk	1,445,000	Oak Hill Country Club (East Course)	Rochester, New York
2012	(Northern Ireland) Rory McIlroy	275	−13	8 strokes	(England) David Lynn	1,445,000	Kiawah Island Golf Resort (Ocean Course)	Kiawah Island, South Carolina
2011	(United States) Keegan Bradley	272	−8	Playoff	(United States) Jason Dufner	1,445,000	Atlanta Athletic Club (Highlands Course)	Johns Creek, Georgia (Note: The club is in a portion of the postal area of Duluth that became part of the newly incorporated city of Johns Creek in 2006. Although the club continues to be served by the Duluth post office, it now states its postal address as Johns Creek.)
2010	(Germany) Martin Kaymer	277	−11	Playoff	(United States) Bubba Watson	1,350,000	Whistling Straits (Straits Course)	Kohler, Wisconsin
2009	(South Korea) Yang Yong-eun	280	−8	3 strokes	(United States) Tiger Woods	1,350,000	Hazeltine National Golf Club	Chaska, Minnesota
2008	(Republic of Ireland) Pádraig Harrington	277	−3	2 strokes	(United States) Ben Curtis (Spain) Sergio García	1,350,000	Oakland Hills Country Club (South Course)	Bloomfield, Michigan
2007	(United States) Tiger Woods (4)	272	−8	2 strokes	(United States) Woody Austin	1,260,000	Southern Hills Country Club	Tulsa, Oklahoma
2006	(United States) Tiger Woods (3)	270	−18	5 strokes	(United States) Shaun Micheel	1,224,000	Medinah Country Club (Course No. 3)	Medinah, Illinois
2005	(United States) Phil Mickelson	276	−4	1 stroke	(Denmark) Thomas Bjørn (Australia) Steve Elkington	1,170,000	Baltusrol Golf Club (Lower Course)	Springfield, New Jersey
2004	(Fiji) Vijay Singh (2)	280	−8	Playoff	(United States) Chris DiMarco (United States) Justin Leonard	1,125,000	Whistling Straits (Straits Course)	Kohler, Wisconsin
2003	(United States) Shaun Micheel	276	−4	2 strokes	(United States) Chad Campbell	1,080,000	Oak Hill Country Club (East Course)	Rochester, New York
2002	(United States) Rich Beem	278	−10	1 stroke	(United States) Tiger Woods	990,000	Hazeltine National Golf Club	Chaska, Minnesota
2001	(United States) David Toms	265	−15	1 stroke	(United States) Phil Mickelson	936,000	Atlanta Athletic Club (Highlands Course)	Duluth, Georgia
2000	(United States) Tiger Woods (2)	270	−18	Playoff	(United States) Bob May	900,000	Valhalla Golf Club	Louisville, Kentucky (Note: At that time, the club had a Louisville postal address, but was located in unincorporated Jefferson County. In 2003, the governments of Louisville and Jefferson County merged, putting the club within the political boundaries of Louisville.)
1999	(United States) Tiger Woods	277	−11	1 stroke	(Spain) Sergio García	630,000	Medinah Country Club (Course No. 3)	Medinah, Illinois
1998	(Fiji) Vijay Singh	271	−9	2 strokes	(United States) Steve Stricker	540,000	Sahalee Country Club	Sammamish, Washington
1997	(United States) Davis Love III	269	−11	5 strokes	(United States) Justin Leonard	470,000	Winged Foot Golf Club (West Course)	Mamaroneck, New York
1996	(United States) Mark Brooks	277	−11	Playoff	(United States) Kenny Perry	430,000	Valhalla Golf Club	Louisville, Kentucky
1995	(Australia) Steve Elkington	267	−17	Playoff	(Scotland) Colin Montgomerie	360,000	Riviera Country Club	Pacific Palisades, California (Note: Pacific Palisades is a neighborhood in Los Angeles with its own postal identity.)
1994	(Zimbabwe) Nick Price (2)	269	−11	6 strokes	(United States) Corey Pavin	310,000	Southern Hills Country Club	Tulsa, Oklahoma
1993	(United States) Paul Azinger	272	−12	Playoff	(Australia) Greg Norman	300,000	Inverness Club	Toledo, Ohio
1992	(Zimbabwe) Nick Price	278	−6	3 strokes	(United States) John Cook (England) Nick Faldo (United States) Jim Gallagher Jr. (United States) Gene Sauers	280,000	Bellerive Country Club	St. Louis, Missouri (Note: The club has a St. Louis postal address, but is located in the suburb of Town and Country.)
1991	(United States) John Daly	276	−12	3 strokes	(United States) Bruce Lietzke	230,000	Crooked Stick Golf Club	Carmel, Indiana
1990	(Australia) Wayne Grady	282	−6	3 strokes	(United States) Fred Couples	225,000	Shoal Creek Golf & Country Club	Birmingham, Alabama
1989	(United States) Payne Stewart	276	−12	1 stroke	(United States) Andy Bean (United States) Mike Reid (United States) Curtis Strange	200,000	Kemper Lakes Golf Club	Kildeer, Illinois
1988	(United States) Jeff Sluman	272	−12	3 strokes	(United States) Paul Azinger	160,000	Oak Tree Golf Club	Edmond, Oklahoma
1987	(United States) Larry Nelson (2)	287	−1	Playoff	(United States) Lanny Wadkins	150,000	PGA National Resort & Spa	Palm Beach Gardens, Florida
1986	(United States) Bob Tway	276	−8	2 strokes	(Australia) Greg Norman	145,000	Inverness Club	Toledo, Ohio
1985	(United States) Hubert Green	278	−6	2 strokes	(United States) Lee Trevino	125,000	Cherry Hills Country Club	Cherry Hills Village, Colorado
1984	(United States) Lee Trevino (2)	273	−15	4 strokes	(South Africa) Gary Player (United States) Lanny Wadkins	125,000	Shoal Creek Golf & Country Club	Birmingham, Alabama
1983	(United States) Hal Sutton	274	−10	1 stroke	(United States) Jack Nicklaus	100,000	Riviera Country Club	Pacific Palisades, California
1982	(United States) Raymond Floyd (2)	272	−8	3 strokes	(United States) Lanny Wadkins	65,000	Southern Hills Country Club	Tulsa, Oklahoma
1981	(United States) Larry Nelson	273	−7	4 strokes	(United States) Fuzzy Zoeller	60,000	Atlanta Athletic Club (Highlands Course)	Duluth, Georgia
1980	(United States) Jack Nicklaus (5)	274	−6	7 strokes	(United States) Andy Bean	60,000	Oak Hill Country Club (East Course)	Rochester, New York
1979	(Australia) David Graham	272	−8	Playoff	(United States) Ben Crenshaw	60,000	Oakland Hills Country Club (South Course)	Bloomfield, Michigan
1978	(United States) John Mahaffey	276	−8	Playoff	(United States) Jerry Pate (United States) Tom Watson	50,000	Oakmont Country Club	Plum, Pennsylvania
1977	(United States) Lanny Wadkins	282	−6	Playoff	(United States) Gene Littler	45,000	Pebble Beach Golf Links	Pebble Beach, California
1976	(United States) Dave Stockton (2)	281	+1	1 stroke	(United States) Raymond Floyd (United States) Don January	45,000	Congressional Country Club (Blue Course)	Bethesda, Maryland
1975	(United States) Jack Nicklaus (4)	276	−4	2 strokes	(Australia) Bruce Crampton	45,000	Firestone Country Club (South Course)	Akron, Ohio
1974	(United States) Lee Trevino	276	−4	1 stroke	(United States) Jack Nicklaus	45,000	Tanglewood Park (Championship Course)	Clemmons, North Carolina
1973	(United States) Jack Nicklaus (3)	277	−7	4 strokes	(Australia) Bruce Crampton	45,000	Canterbury Golf Club	Beachwood, Ohio
1972	(South Africa) Gary Player (2)	281	+1	2 strokes	(United States) Tommy Aaron (United States) Jim Jamieson	45,000	Oakland Hills Country Club (South Course)	Bloomfield Hills, Michigan
1971	(United States) Jack Nicklaus (2)	281	−7	2 strokes	(United States) Billy Casper	40,000	PGA National Golf Club	Palm Beach Gardens, Florida
1970	(United States) Dave Stockton	279	−1	2 strokes	(United States) Bob Murphy (United States) Arnold Palmer	40,000	Southern Hills Country Club	Tulsa, Oklahoma
1969	(United States) Raymond Floyd	276	−8	1 stroke	(South Africa) Gary Player	35,000	NCR Country Club (South Course)	Dayton, Ohio
1968	(United States) Julius Boros	281	+1	1 stroke	(New Zealand) Bob Charles (United States) Arnold Palmer	25,000	Pecan Valley Golf Club	San Antonio, Texas
1967	(United States) Don January	281	−7	Playoff	(United States) Don Massengale	25,000	Columbine Country Club	Columbine Valley, Colorado
1966	(United States) Al Geiberger	280	E	4 strokes	(United States) Dudley Wysong	25,000	Firestone Country Club (South Course)	Akron, Ohio
1965	(United States) Dave Marr	280	−4	2 strokes	(United States) Billy Casper (United States) Jack Nicklaus	25,000	Laurel Valley Golf Club	Ligonier, Pennsylvania
1964	(United States) Bobby Nichols	271	−9	3 strokes	(United States) Jack Nicklaus (United States) Arnold Palmer	18,000	Columbus Country Club	Columbus, Ohio
1963	(United States) Jack Nicklaus	279	−5	2 strokes	(United States) Dave Ragan	13,000	Dallas Athletic Club (Blue Course)	Dallas, Texas
1962	(South Africa) Gary Player	278	−2	1 stroke	(United States) Bob Goalby	13,000	Aronimink Golf Club	Newtown Square, Pennsylvania
1961	(United States) Jerry Barber	277	−3	Playoff	(United States) Don January	11,000	Olympia Fields Country Club	Olympia Fields, Illinois
1960	(United States) Jay Hebert	281	+1	1 stroke	(Australia) Jim Ferrier	11,000	Firestone Country Club (South Course)	Akron, Ohio
1959	(United States) Bob Rosburg	277	−3	1 stroke	(United States) Jerry Barber (United States) Doug Sanders	8,250	Minneapolis Golf Club	St. Louis Park, Minnesota
1958	(United States) Dow Finsterwald	276	−4	2 strokes	(United States) Billy Casper	5,500	Llanerch Country Club	Havertown, Pennsylvania

=== Match play era winners ===
Year	Winner	Score	Runner-up	Winners share ($)	Venue	Location
1957	(United States) Lionel Hebert	2 and 1	(United States) Dow Finsterwald	8,000	Miami Valley Country Club	Dayton, Ohio
1956	(United States) Jack Burke Jr.	3 and 2	(United States) Ted Kroll	5,000	Blue Hill Country Club	Canton, Massachusetts
1955	(United States) Doug Ford	4 and 3	(United States) Cary Middlecoff	5,000	Meadowbrook Country Club	Northville, Michigan
1954	(United States) Chick Harbert	4 and 3	(United States) Walter Burkemo	5,000	Keller Golf Course	Maplewood, Minnesota
1953	(United States) Walter Burkemo	2 and 1	(United States) Felice Torza	5,000	Birmingham Country Club	Birmingham, Michigan
1952	(United States) Jim Turnesa	1 up	(United States) Chick Harbert	3,500	Big Spring Country Club	Louisville, Kentucky
1951	(United States) Sam Snead (3)	7 and 6	(United States) Walter Burkemo	3,500	Oakmont Country Club	Plum, Pennsylvania
1950	(United States) Chandler Harper	4 and 3	(United States) Henry Williams Jr.	3,500	Scioto Country Club	Columbus, Ohio
1949	(United States) Sam Snead (2)	3 and 2	(United States) Johnny Palmer	3,500	Hermitage Country Club	Richmond, Virginia
1948	(United States) Ben Hogan (2)	7 and 6	(United States) Mike Turnesa	3,500	Norwood Hills Country Club	St. Louis, Missouri
1947	(Australia) Jim Ferrier	2 and 1	(United States) Chick Harbert	3,500	Plum Hollow Country Club	Southfield, Michigan
1946	(United States) Ben Hogan	6 and 4	(United States) Ed Oliver	3,500	Portland Golf Club	Portland, Oregon
1945	(United States) Byron Nelson (2)	4 and 3	(United States) Sam Byrd	3,750	Moraine Country Club	Kettering, Ohio
1944	(United States) Bob Hamilton	1 up	(United States) Byron Nelson	3,500	Manito Golf & Country Club	Spokane, Washington
1943: No tournament due to World War II
1942	(United States) Sam Snead	2 and 1	(United States) Jim Turnesa	1,000	Seaview Country Club	Atlantic City, New Jersey
1941	(United States) Vic Ghezzi	38 holes	(United States) Byron Nelson	1,100	Cherry Hills Country Club	Cherry Hills Village, Colorado
1940	(United States) Byron Nelson	1 up	(United States) Sam Snead	1,100	Hershey Country Club (West Course)	Hershey, Pennsylvania
1939	(United States) Henry Picard	37 holes	(United States) Byron Nelson	1,100	Pomonok Country Club	Flushing, New York
1938	(United States) Paul Runyan (2)	8 and 7	(United States) Sam Snead	1,100	The Shawnee Inn & Golf Resort	Smithfield Township, Pennsylvania
1937	(United States) Denny Shute (2)	37 holes	(United States) Harold McSpaden	1,000	Pittsburgh Field Club	O'Hara Township, Pennsylvania
1936	(United States) Denny Shute	3 and 2	(United States) Jimmy Thomson	1,000	Pinehurst Resort (No. 2 Course)	Pinehurst, North Carolina
1935	(United States) Johnny Revolta	5 and 4	(United States) Tommy Armour	1,000	Twin Hills Golf & Country Club	Oklahoma City, Oklahoma
1934	(United States) Paul Runyan	38 holes	(United States) Craig Wood	1,000	The Park Country Club	Williamsville, New York
1933	(United States) Gene Sarazen (3)	5 and 4	(United States) Willie Goggin	1,000	Blue Mound Golf & Country Club	Wauwatosa, Wisconsin
1932	(United States) Olin Dutra	4 and 3	(United States) Frank Walsh	1,000	Keller Golf Course	Maplewood, Minnesota
1931	(United States) Tom Creavy	2 and 1	(United States) Denny Shute	1,000	Wannamoisett Country Club	Rumford, Rhode Island
1930	(United States) Tommy Armour (Note: These players were British born, but they were based in the United States when they won the PGA Championship, and they became U.S. citizens: Tommy Armour – Born in Scotland but moved to the U.S. in the early 1920s and became a U.S. citizen in 1942. Jock Hutchison – Born in Scotland. He became a U.S. citizen in 1920.)	1 up	(United States) Gene Sarazen		Fresh Meadow Country Club	Queens, New York
1929	(United States) Leo Diegel (2)	6 and 4	(United States) Johnny Farrell		Hillcrest Country Club	Los Angeles, California
1928	(United States) Leo Diegel	6 and 5	(United States) Al Espinosa		Baltimore Country Club (East Course)	Timonium, Maryland
1927	(United States) Walter Hagen (5)	1 up	(United States) Joe Turnesa		Cedar Crest	Dallas, Texas
1926	(United States) Walter Hagen (4)	5 and 3	(United States) Leo Diegel		Salisbury (Red Course)	East Meadow, New York
1925	(United States) Walter Hagen (3)	6 and 5	(United States) Bill Mehlhorn		Olympia Fields Country Club	Olympia Fields, Illinois
1924	(United States) Walter Hagen (2)	2 up	(England) Jim Barnes		French Lick Springs (Hill Course)	French Lick, Indiana
1923	(United States) Gene Sarazen (2)	38 holes	(United States) Walter Hagen		Pelham Country Club	Pelham Manor, New York
1922	(United States) Gene Sarazen	4 and 3	(United States) Emmet French	500	Oakmont Country Club	Plum, Pennsylvania
1921	(United States) Walter Hagen	3 and 2	(England) Jim Barnes	500	Inwood Country Club	Inwood, New York
1920	(United States) Jock Hutchison	1 up	(England) J. Douglas Edgar	500	Flossmoor Country Club	Flossmoor, Illinois
1919	(England) Jim Barnes (2)	6 and 5	(Scotland) Fred McLeod	500	Engineers Country Club	Roslyn Harbor, New York
1917–18: No tournament due to World War I
1916	(England) Jim Barnes	1 up	(Scotland) Jock Hutchison	500	Siwanoy Country Club	Bronxville, New York

== Match play era details ==
The table below lists the field sizes and qualification methods for the match play era. All rounds were played over 36 holes except as noted in the table.

Years	Field size	Qualification	18 hole rounds
1916–21	32	sectional*	
1922	64	sectional	1st two rounds
1923	64	sectional	
1924–34	32	36 hole qualifier	
1935–41	64	36 hole qualifier	1st two rounds
1942–45	32	36 hole qualifier	
1946–55	64	36 hole qualifier	1st two rounds
1956	128	sectional	1st four rounds
1957	128	sectional	1st four rounds, consolation matches (3rd-8th place)

* In 1921, the field consisted of the defending champion and the top 31 qualifiers from the 1921 U.S. Open.

== Summary by course, state and region ==
Summary by course, state and region
Course	Number	State	Number	Region	Number
Blue Hill Country Club	1	Massachusetts	1	New England	2
Wannamoisett Country Club	1	Rhode Island	1	New England	2
Baltusrol Golf Club	2	New Jersey	3	Mid-Atlantic	27
Seaview Country Club	1	New Jersey	3	Mid-Atlantic	27
Bethpage Black Course	1	New York	14	Mid-Atlantic	27
Engineers Country Club	1	New York	14	Mid-Atlantic	27
Fresh Meadow Country Club	1	New York	14	Mid-Atlantic	27
Inwood Country Club	1	New York	14	Mid-Atlantic	27
Oak Hill Country Club	4	New York	14	Mid-Atlantic	27
Pelham Country Club	1	New York	14	Mid-Atlantic	27
Pomonok Country Club	1	New York	14	Mid-Atlantic	27
Salisbury Golf Club	1	New York	14	Mid-Atlantic	27
Siwanoy Country Club	1	New York	14	Mid-Atlantic	27
The Park Country Club	1	New York	14	Mid-Atlantic	27
Winged Foot Golf Club	1	New York	14	Mid-Atlantic	27
Aronimink Golf Club	2	Pennsylvania	10	Mid-Atlantic	27
Hershey Country Club	1	Pennsylvania	10	Mid-Atlantic	27
Laurel Valley Golf Club	1	Pennsylvania	10	Mid-Atlantic	27
Llanerch Country Club	1	Pennsylvania	10	Mid-Atlantic	27
Oakmont Country Club	3	Pennsylvania	10	Mid-Atlantic	27
Pittsburgh Field Club	1	Pennsylvania	10	Mid-Atlantic	27
The Shawnee Inn & Golf Resort	1	Pennsylvania	10	Mid-Atlantic	27
PGA National Golf Club	1	Florida	1	South Atlantic	13
Atlanta Athletic Club	3	Georgia	3	South Atlantic	13
Baltimore Country Club	1	Maryland	2	South Atlantic	13
Congressional Country Club	1	Maryland	2	South Atlantic	13
Pinehurst Resort	1	North Carolina	4	South Atlantic	13
Quail Hollow	2	North Carolina	4	South Atlantic	13
Tanglewood Park	1	North Carolina	4	South Atlantic	13
Kiawah Island Golf Resort	2	South Carolina	2	South Atlantic	13
Hermitage Country Club	1	Virginia	1	South Atlantic	13
Shoal Creek Golf and Country Club	2	Alabama	2	East South Central	7
Big Spring Country Club	1	Kentucky	5	East South Central	7
Valhalla Golf Club	4	Kentucky	5	East South Central	7
Oak Tree Golf Club	1	Oklahoma	7	West South Central	10
Southern Hills Country Club	5	Oklahoma	7	West South Central	10
Twin Hills Golf & Country Club	1	Oklahoma	7	West South Central	10
Cedar Crest Country Club	1	Texas	3	West South Central	10
Dallas Athletic Club	1	Texas	3	West South Central	10
Pecan Valley Golf Club	1	Texas	3	West South Central	10
Flossmoor Country Club	1	Illinois	6	East North Central	29
Kemper Lakes Golf Club	1	Illinois	6	East North Central	29
Medinah Country Club	2	Illinois	6	East North Central	29
Olympia Fields Country Club	2	Illinois	6	East North Central	29
Crooked Stick Golf Club	1	Indiana	2	East North Central	29
French Lick Springs Resort	1	Indiana	2	East North Central	29
Birmingham Country Club	1	Michigan	6	East North Central	29
Meadowbrook Country Club	1	Michigan	6	East North Central	29
Oakland Hills Country Club	3	Michigan	6	East North Central	29
Plum Hollow Country Club	1	Michigan	6	East North Central	29
Canterbury Golf Club	1	Ohio	11	East North Central	29
Columbus Country Club	1	Ohio	11	East North Central	29
Firestone Country Club	3	Ohio	11	East North Central	29
Inverness Club	2	Ohio	11	East North Central	29
Miami Valley Golf Club	1	Ohio	11	East North Central	29
Moraine Country Club	1	Ohio	11	East North Central	29
NCR Country Club	1	Ohio	11	East North Central	29
Scioto Country Club	1	Ohio	11	East North Central	29
Blue Mound Golf & Country Club	1	Wisconsin	4	East North Central	29
Whistling Straits	3	Wisconsin	4	East North Central	29
Hazeltine National Golf Club	2	Minnesota	5	West North Central	8
Keller Golf Course	2	Minnesota	5	West North Central	8
Minneapolis Golf Club	1	Minnesota	5	West North Central	8
Bellerive Country Club	2	Missouri	3	West North Central	8
Norwood Hills Country Club	1	Missouri	3	West North Central	8
Cherry Hills Country Club	2	Colorado	3	Mountain	3
Columbine Country Club	1	Colorado	3	Mountain	3
Hillcrest Country Club	1	California	5	Pacific	8
Pebble Beach Golf Links	1	California	5	Pacific	8
Riviera Country Club	2	California	5	Pacific	8
TPC Harding Park	1	California	5	Pacific	8
Portland Golf Club	1	Oregon	1	Pacific	8
Manito Golf and Country Club	1	Washington	2	Pacific	8
Sahalee Country Club	1	Washington	2	Pacific	8

== Records ==
- Most wins: 5, Jack Nicklaus, Walter Hagen
- Most runner-up finishes: 4, Jack Nicklaus
- Oldest winner: Phil Mickelson in 2021 (50 years, 11 months)
- Youngest winner: Gene Sarazen in 1922 (20 years, 174 days)
- Greatest winning margin in the match play era: Paul Runyan beat Sam Snead 8 & 7 in 1938
- Greatest winning margin in the stroke play era: 8 strokes, Rory McIlroy in 2012
- Lowest absolute 72-hole score: 264, Brooks Koepka (69-63-66-66), 2018
- Lowest 72-hole score in relation to par: −20, Jason Day (68-67-66-67=268) in 2015
  - This is the lowest score in relation to par at any major championship.
  - Koepka's 2018 score was −16. The 2018 site, Bellerive Country Club, played to par 70, while the 2015 site, the Straits Course at Whistling Straits, played to par 72. (Bellerive played to par 71 when it hosted in 1992, and the Straits Course also played to par 72 when it hosted in 2004 and 2010.)
- Lowest 18-hole score: 62 – Xander Schauffele, 1st round, 2024
- Most frequent venues:
  - 5 PGA Championships: Southern Hills Country Club – 1970, 1982, 1994, 2007, 2022
  - 4 PGA Championships: Oak Hill Country Club, East Course – 1980, 2003, 2013, 2023
  - 4 PGA Championships: Valhalla Golf Club – 1996, 2000, 2014, 2024
  - 3 PGA Championships: Atlanta Athletic Club, Highlands Course – 1981, 2001, 2011
  - 3 PGA Championships: Firestone Country Club, South Course – 1960, 1966, 1975
  - 3 PGA Championships: Oakland Hills Country Club, South Course – 1972, 1979, 2008
  - 3 PGA Championships: Oakmont Country Club – 1922, 1951, 1978
  - 3 PGA Championships: Whistling Straits, Straits Course – 2004, 2010, 2015

== Broadcasting ==
The PGA Championship is televised in the United States by CBS and ESPN. Beginning 2020, ESPN holds rights to early-round and weekend morning coverage, and will air supplemental coverage through its digital subscription service ESPN+ prior to weekday coverage and during weekend broadcast windows. CBS holds rights to weekend-afternoon coverage. Both contracts run through 2030, with ESPN's contract replacing a prior agreement with TNT. CBS has televised the PGA Championship since 1991, when it replaced ABC. The ESPN telecasts are co-produced with CBS Sports, mirroring the broadcast arrangements used by ESPN for the Masters Tournament.

== Future sites ==
Year	Edition	Course	Location	Dates	Hosted
2027	109th	PGA Frisco	Frisco, Texas	May 20–23	Never
2028	110th	Olympic Club	San Francisco, California	May 18–21	Never
2029	111th	Baltusrol Golf Club	Springfield, New Jersey	May 17–20	2005, 2016
2030	112th	Congressional Country Club	Bethesda, Maryland	TBD	1976
2031	113th	Kiawah Island Golf Resort	Kiawah Island, South Carolina	TBD	2012, 2021
2032	114th	Southern Hills Country Club	Tulsa, Oklahoma	TBD	1970, 1982, 1994, 2007, 2022
2033	115th	Bethpage State Park Black Course	Farmingdale, New York	TBD	2019
2034	116th	PGA Frisco	Frisco, Texas	TBD	2027
2035	117th	Oak Hill Country Club	Pittsford, New York	TBD	1980, 2003, 2013, 2023

== See also ==
- Golf in the United States
