= Pebble Beach Golf Links =

Public golf course in California, U.S.

- Location within the United States Location within California
- 36°34′07″N 121°57′02″W

Club information
- Location: Pebble Beach, California, U.S.
- Established: 1919; 107 years ago
- Type: Public
- Owner: Pebble Beach Co.
- Operator: Pebble Beach Co.
- Total holes: 18
- Tournaments: U.S. Open (1972, 1982, 1992, 2000, 2010, 2019); PGA Championship (1977); AT&T Pebble Beach Pro-Am (1947–present); PURE Insurance Championship (2004–present); U.S. Women's Open (2023)
- Greens: Poa annua
- Fairways: Winter ryegrass
- Website: Official website

Pebble Beach Golf Links
- Designed by: Jack Neville and Douglas Grant (1919); Arnold Palmer & Thad Layton (2016 renovation)
- Par: 72 (71 – U.S. Open)
- Length: 7,075 yards (6,469 m)
- Course rating: 75.9 (U.S. Open)
- Slope rating: 148
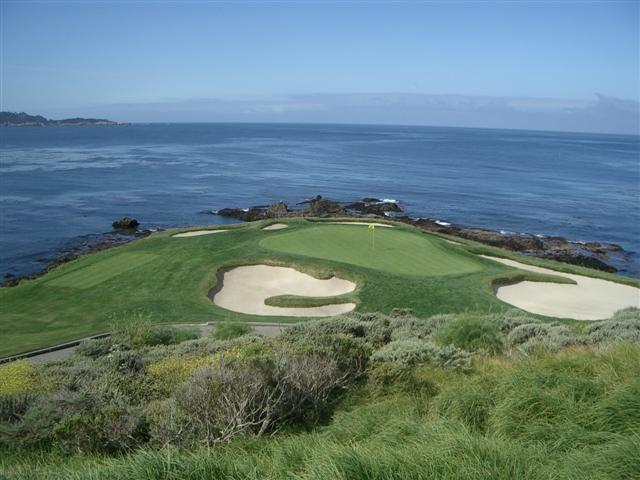
- The 7th hole in 2005

Pebble Beach Golf Links is a public golf course located in Pebble Beach, California, U.S.

Opened in 1919, it has been described as one of the most beautiful courses in the world. It hugs the rugged coastline and has views of Carmel Bay, opening to the Pacific Ocean on the south side of the Monterey Peninsula. In 2001, it became the first public course to be selected as the No. 1 Golf Course in America by Golf Digest. Greens fees are among the highest in the world.

Three of the courses in the coastal community of Pebble Beach, including Pebble Beach Golf Links, belong to the Pebble Beach Company, which also operates three hotels and a spa at the resort. The other courses are The Links at Spanish Bay, and Spyglass Hill Golf Course.

The PGA Tour and PGA Tour Champions play annual events at Pebble Beach: the AT&T Pebble Beach Pro-Am and the First Tee Open. It has hosted seven men's major championships: six U.S. Opens and a PGA Championship. It also hosted the 1988 Nabisco Championship, now known as the Tour Championship, the season-ending event on the PGA Tour. It hosted its first women's major championship, the 2023 U.S. Women's Open on July 6, 2023. World-renowned, the course is included in many golf video games, such as the Links series and the PGA Tour series.

== History ==
The course began as part of the complex of the Hotel del Monte, a resort hotel in Monterey, California, built by Charles Crocker, one of California's Big Four railroad barons, through Southern Pacific Railroad's property division, Pacific Improvement Company. The hotel first opened on June 10, 1880. The famous 17-Mile Drive was originally designed as a local excursion route for visitors to the Del Monte to take in the historic sights of Monterey and Pacific Grove and the scenery of what would become Pebble Beach.

The course was designed by champion golfers Jack Neville and Douglas Grant and opened on February 22, 1919. Neville also designed the back nine at Pacific Grove Municipal Golf Course on the other side of the Monterey Peninsula. His objective was to place as many of the holes as possible along the rocky and beautiful Monterey coastline. This was accomplished using a "figure 8" layout.

The course was extensively revised in 1928 by H. Chandler Egan. Other architects who have worked on the course include Alistair MacKenzie and Robert Hunter (1927) and Jack Nicklaus (creation of the new fifth hole, 1998).

On February 27, 1919, Samuel Finley Brown Morse formed the Del Monte Properties Company, and acquired the extensive holdings of the Pacific Improvement Company, which included the Del Monte Forest, the Del Monte Lodge and the Hotel Del Monte. After World War II, the Hotel del Monte building and surrounding grounds were acquired by the United States Navy to its Naval Postgraduate School and the building was renamed Herrmann Hall. The Golf Course Histories website has an aerial comparison of the changes to the course, notably the 17th hole, from 1938 to 2014.

The course was bought by a consortium of Japanese investors during the upswing of foreign investments in American properties in the early 1990s. The sale, however, generated controversy when it was discovered that one of the investors had alleged ties to organized crime in Japan. It was then bought by another group of Japanese investors before being sold to the Pebble Beach Co. several years later.

In June 2026 caddies at Pebble voted to unionize under the UNITE HERE union.

== Tournaments ==
The first Pebble Beach Championship for Women was played February 9–12, 1923, with Marion Hollins as champion over Doreen Kavanaugh. Pebble Beach hosted the first California Women's Amateur Championship in 1967 as well as subsequent tournaments until it was moved to Quail Lodge & Golf Club in Carmel Valley in 1987.

The first professional tournament at Pebble Beach was the Monterey Peninsula Open in 1926, which had a $5,000 purse. "Lighthorse" Harry Cooper of Texas won with a 72-hole score of 293 (+5). In 1929, Pebble hosted its first major—the U.S. Amateur. A match play event, it was won by Jimmy Johnston of Minnesota, while Bobby Jones tied for medalist honors in the stroke play qualifier, but lost his first-round match to Johnny Goodman.

In 1947, Pebble Beach began its run as one of the host courses for the Bing Crosby National Pro-Am tournament, sometimes known as the "Clam Bake", and now the AT&T Pebble Beach Pro-Am. The tournament is held annually, usually in February, and is an unusual four-round tournament. The final round on Sunday is played at Pebble Beach, but the first three rounds of pro-am play are contested in round-robin format at Pebble Beach and Spyglass Hill Golf Course.

== Scorecard ==
Tee	Rating/Slope	1	2	3	4	5	6	7	8	9	Out	10	11	12	13	14	15	16	17	18	In	Total
2019 U.S. Open	75.9 / 148	380	516	404	331	195	523	109	428	526	3412	495	390	202	445	580	397	403	208	543	3663	7075
Par		4	4	4	4	3	5	3	4	4	35	4	4	3	4	5	4	4	3	5	36	71
Blue	74.9 / 144	378	509	397	333	189	498	107	416	483	3310	444	370	202	401	559	393	400	182	541	3492	6802
Gold	73.4 / 137	349	491	381	308	145	490	98	388	463	3113	428	349	187	390	545	375	378	176	531	3359	6472
White	71.7 / 135	337	458	340	295	134	465	94	364	436	2923	408	338	176	370	490	338	368	166	506	3160	6083
Green	68.7 / 126	328	428	291	251	125	457	90	354	362	2686	344	303	167	302	452	330	324	148	491	2861	5547
Red	67.3 / 124	310	358	285	197	111	420	87	341	350	2467	338	298	126	295	446	247	312	142	454	2658	5125
SI	Men's	6	10	12	16	14	2	18	4	8		3	9	17	7	1	13	11	15	5
Par		4	5	4	4	3	5	3	4	4	36	4	4	3	4	5	4	4	3	5	36	72
SI	Women's	10	6	12	14	16	4	18	2	8		7	9	13	11	1	15	5	17	3

== Nabisco Championship ==
Year	Winner	Country	Score	Purse ($)	Winner's share ($)
1988	Curtis Strange	United States	279 (−9)	2,000,000	360,000

== U.S. Opens ==
Pebble Beach has hosted the U.S. Open six times: 1972, 1982, 1992, 2000, 2010, and 2019 and is scheduled a seventh time in 2027.

=== 1972 ===
The U.S. Open was first held at Pebble Beach in 1972, won by Jack Nicklaus, who captured his 11th major title (of an eventual 18) as a professional. It was a historically important win, as Nicklaus tied Bobby Jones with 13 major titles; a lifelong amateur, Jones' major titles were in the U.S. Open, British Open, U.S. Amateur, and British Amateur. Nicklaus won the U.S. Amateur twice, in 1959 (Broadmoor, Colorado) and 1961 (Pebble Beach).

Nicklaus secured the victory in 1972 with one of the most famous golf shots of all time. He arrived at the 17th tee facing deteriorating weather and a brisk wind on the challenging par-3 hole. Nicklaus hit a 1-iron that bounced once and struck the flagstick; it came to rest next to the cup for a tap-in birdie.

Two months earlier, Nicklaus had won the Masters to become the first in a dozen years (Arnold Palmer in 1960) to win golf's first two major titles of the season. At the British Open in July, Nicklaus shot a final round 66 to finish second, one stroke behind Lee Trevino, ending his Grand Slam run in 1972. (Palmer also missed a third straight major by a stroke at the 1960 British Open.) Through 2025, only one golfer has won the Masters, U.S. Open, and British Open in the same calendar year: Ben Hogan in 1953.

Nicklaus also won the Crosby events on either side of this Open, in 1972 and 1973, and previously in 1967.

=== 1982 ===
Nicklaus was also a key player in 1982 at Pebble Beach. On the front nine on Sunday, Nicklaus made five straight birdies on holes 3 through 7 and finished ahead of the last group tied for the lead. As was the case in 1972, the 17th hole was again the site of one golf's most memorable shots. In the last group, future Hall Of Famer Tom Watson hit his tee shot on the par-3 17th just a few feet off the green, into heavy rough which had been grown very tall and thick, typical of USGA Open playing conditions. His succeeding pitch was from above the hole; he needed to strike the ball firmly to get the ball out of the rough, but such an aggressive attack would likely leave a long comeback putt to save par, unless hit perfectly. In a live television interview immediately after Watson's errant tee shot, and given the difficulty of Watson's upcoming pitch shot Nicklaus appeared confident that he would soon be in the outright lead.

Watson was apparently equally confident. He and his caddy Bruce Edwards strategized on the shot, and Edwards encouraged him to get the ball close. Watson replied, "Close, hell, I'm going to sink it." The pitch came out perfectly, landed softly and rolled into the cup. Watson ran onto the green jubilantly and gestured back at Edwards saying "I told you so". He then birdied the challenging par-5 18th hole for a two-shot victory margin in his only U.S. Open win. Watson had previously won twice at Pebble Beach, in the Crosby events of 1977 and 1978.

During the following winter, a storm eroded portions of the 17th green and 18th tee box into the Pacific Ocean. Though rebuilt, the exact spot where Watson struck his historic chip shot no longer exists.

=== 1992 ===
The 1992 championship was one of the most difficult ever played at Pebble Beach, with clear skies and brisk winds on the weekend. Only two players finished under par: champion Tom Kite at 285 (-3) and runner-up Jeff Sluman at 287 (-1). Gil Morgan was 12 under par early in the third round, but later fell back. Kite was one of the best players on tour in the 1980s, with 19 top tens in majors prior to 1992. Perhaps the best player of his era without a major, he finally won at Pebble Beach at age 42.

This championship was also notable as the last par-72 course in the U.S. Open, with no converted par 5's, until 2017, when Erin Hills, which was built in 1998, played as a par-72. It also marked Phil Mickelson's first major as a professional.

=== 2000 ===
Perhaps looking for a special place to host in 2000, the USGA decided that Pebble Beach should host the first U.S. Open of the millennium and the 100th edition of the tournament. In some respects, this Open was even tougher than the 1992 contest, with only one player finishing under par – champion Tiger Woods. Woods scored 65-69-71-67 to tie a U.S. Open record with 272, and set a U.S. Open record by finishing 12 under par, reaching Morgan's mark during his final round but recording no bogeys during the final round to finish 15 shots ahead of joint runners-up Miguel Ángel Jiménez and Ernie Els – the largest margin of victory ever in a major championship, surpassing the 13-shot record margin set by Old Tom Morris at the 1862 Open Championship at Prestwick.

Woods' first U.S. Open championship and third career major was also the start of his non-calendar year "Tiger Slam" as he also won the following three majors to hold all four major titles simultaneously (in order, the 2000 Open Championship at the Old Course at St Andrews, the 2000 PGA Championship at Valhalla and the 2001 Masters at Augusta National). It also made Woods the first to win the U.S. Junior Amateur, U.S. Amateur and U.S. Open. This was also Jack Nicklaus' 44th consecutive and final U.S. Open, as well as the last for two-time champion Curtis Strange.

On the eve of the tournament, the 18th hole also hosted a memorial for Payne Stewart, who had won the previous year's tournament at Pinehurst No. 2 but then died in a plane crash in October at the age of 42. Speakers included Stewart's widow Tracey and Payne's friend and fellow professional Paul Azinger, while attendees included Stewart's caddy Mike Hicks and other professionals who then competed in the tournament such as Mickelson, David Duval, Davis Love III, Tom Lehman, Lee Janzen and Sergio García. The ceremony concluded with shots being hit into Stillwater Cove in a golf version of a 21-gun salute. García also wore Stewart's trademark navy plus fours during his opening round, while Nicklaus was given Stewart's defending champion spot in the traditional pairings alongside Open Championship winner Paul Lawrie and U.S. Amateur winner David Gossett and asked for a moment of silence in Stewart's memory before his opening tee shot.

=== 2010 ===
Graeme McDowell won in 2010 by one stroke over Grégory Havret. Ernie Els finished third, with Woods and Phil Mickelson in a tie for fourth. McDowell, from Northern Ireland, became the first European to win the U.S. Open in forty years. In his last U.S. Open, 1982 champion Watson at age 60 became the second-oldest player to make a U.S. Open cut (after Sam Snead, age 61 in 1973), and finished tied for 29th.

=== 2019 ===
Gary Woodland won in 2019 by three strokes over Brooks Koepka. Woodland prevented Koepka from becoming the first golfer in over 100 years to win three consecutive U.S. Opens. In his final amateur tournament, Viktor Hovland finished tied for 12th. With a 4-under total of 280, Hovland broke Jack Nicklaus' U.S. Open scoring total for an amateur. Nicklaus shot 282 over four rounds at Cherry Hills Country Club in 1960.

== Major tournaments hosted ==
Year	Tournament	Winner	Score	To par	Margin of victory	Runner(s) Up	Winner's share ($)
1929	U.S. Amateur	(United States) Jimmy Johnston	Match play		4 and 3	(United States) Oscar Willing	n/a
1940	U.S. Women's Amateur	(United States) Betty Jameson	Match play		6 and 5	(United States) Jane S. Cothran	n/a
1947	U.S. Amateur	(United States) Skee Riegel	Match play		2 and 1	(United States) Johnny Dawson	n/a
1948	U.S. Women's Amateur (2)	(United States) Grace Lenczyk	Match play		4 and 3	(United States) Helen Sigel	n/a
1961	U.S. Amateur	(United States) Jack Nicklaus	Match play		8 and 6	(United States) Dudley Wysong	n/a
1972	U.S. Open	(United States) Jack Nicklaus	290	+2	3 strokes	(Australia) Bruce Crampton	30,000
1977	PGA Championship	(United States) Lanny Wadkins	282	−6	Playoff^	(United States) Gene Littler	45,000
1982	U.S. Open	(United States) Tom Watson	282	−6	2 strokes	(United States) Jack Nicklaus	60,000
1992	U.S. Open	(United States) Tom Kite	285	−3	2 strokes	(United States) Jeff Sluman	275,000
1999	U.S. Amateur	(United States) David Gossett	Match play		9 and 8	(South Korea) Kim Sung-yoon	n/a
2000	U.S. Open	(United States) Tiger Woods	272	−12	15 strokes	(South Africa) Ernie Els (Spain) Miguel Angel Jimenez	800,000
2010	U.S. Open	(Northern Ireland) Graeme McDowell	284	E	1 stroke	(France) Grégory Havret	1,350,000
2018	U.S. Amateur (5)	(Norway) Viktor Hovland	Match play		6 and 5	(United States) Devon Bling	n/a
2019	U.S. Open (6)	(United States) Gary Woodland	271	−13	3 strokes	(United States) Brooks Koepka	2,250,000
2023	U.S. Women's Open	(United States) Allisen Corpuz	279	−9	3 strokes	(England) Charley Hull (South Korea) Jiyai Shin	2,000,000
2027	U.S. Open						
2032	U.S. Open						
2035	U.S. Women's Open						
2037	U.S. Open						
2040	U.S. Women's Open						
2044	U.S. Open						
2048	U.S. Women's Open						

^ Sudden-death playoff, won on third extra hole

- Par 72 for majors through 1992; par 71 for U.S. Open only since (2nd hole changed to par 4 in 2000; for the U.S. Women's Open, it is a par 5)

== Controversy over further golf course development ==
There has been continuing controversy between recreational interests and environmental protection, related to a proposed new golf course development by the Pebble Beach Company. The new golf course proposal has existed in some form since the early 1990s; while the environmental protection issues center on the potential damage to rare and endangered species in this locale. The Pebble Beach Company agreed to leave 635 acres of forest area on the Pebble Beach property undeveloped.
