= 1977 PGA Championship =

Tournament information
- Dates: August 11–14, 1977
- Location: Pebble Beach, California; 36.568°N 121.950°W
- Course: Pebble Beach Golf Links
- Organized by: PGA of America
- Tour: PGA Tour

Statistics
- Par: 72
- Length: 6,806 yards (6,223 m)
- Field: 138 players, 71 after cut
- Cut: 151 (+7)
- Prize fund: $250,000
- Winner's share: $45,000

Champion
- (United States) Lanny Wadkins
- 282 (−6), playoff
- Location in the United States Location in California

The 1977 PGA Championship was the 59th PGA Championship, played August 11–14 at Pebble Beach Golf Links in Pebble Beach, California. Lanny Wadkins, 27, won his only major championship in a sudden-death playoff over Gene Littler. It was the first playoff at the PGA Championship in ten years and was the first-ever sudden-death playoff in a stroke-play major championship. The last was 36 years earlier at the 1941 PGA Championship, when the 36-hole final match went to two extra holes.

Prior to the start of the championship, the irons of several top players were deemed to have non-conforming groove dimensions, most notably those of Tom Watson. He had won the Masters and British Open earlier that year, and was attempting to become the first to win three majors in the same year since Ben Hogan in 1953. Others with non-conforming irons included major winners Raymond Floyd, Hale Irwin, Gary Player, and Tom Weiskopf. The rule limiting groove width to .035 inches (0.89 mm) had been around for decades. Watson shot an opening round of 68 (−4) with an old set of borrowed irons, and finished at 286 (−2), four strokes back in a tie for sixth. He won eight majors but never a PGA Championship; his only win in the U.S. Open came here at Pebble Beach in 1982.

Four-time champion Jack Nicklaus finished one stroke out of the playoff at 283 (−5). He won the previous major at this course, the U.S. Open in 1972, and was runner-up to Watson at the next in 1982.

This was the 13th consecutive professional major won by American-born players. The streak began with Lee Trevino's victory at the 1974 PGA Championship and continued as the Americans swept the majors in 1975, 1976, and the previous majors in 1977. This remains the second longest major-winning streak for Americans; the longest was in the 1940s and ended with Lew Worsham's win at the 1947 U.S. Open.

This was the second major championship at Pebble Beach, which had hosted the U.S. Open in 1972. The U.S. Open returned in 1982, 1992, 2000, 2010, and 2019. It was only the second PGA Championship in California and the first as a stroke-play competition; the previous was in December 1929 in Los Angeles at Hillcrest. The 1962 event was originally awarded to Brentwood in L.A., but was moved to Philadelphia at Aronimink.

The fairways at Pebble Beach were extremely dry, due to an extended drought, in its third year in northern California.

== Round summaries ==
=== First round ===
Thursday, August 11, 1977

| Place | Player | Score | To par |
|---|---|---|---|
| 1 | (United States) Gene Littler | 67 | −5 |
| T2 | (United States) Mark Hayes | 68 | −4 |
| T2 | (United States) Jerry McGee | 68 | −4 |
| T2 | (United States) Tom Watson | 68 | −4 |
| T5 | (United States) George Cadle | 69 | −3 |
| T5 | (United States) Jack Nicklaus | 69 | −3 |
| T5 | (United States) Lanny Wadkins | 69 | −3 |
| T8 | (United States) George Archer | 70 | −2 |
| T8 | (United States) Charles Coody | 70 | −2 |
| T8 | (New Zealand) John Lister | 70 | −2 |
| T8 | (United States) Roger Maltbie | 70 | −2 |
| T8 | (United States) Johnny Miller | 70 | −2 |
| T8 | (United States) Fuzzy Zoeller | 70 | −2 |

=== Second round ===
Friday, August 12, 1977

| Place | Player | Score | To par |
|---|---|---|---|
| 1 | (United States) Gene Littler | 67-69=136 | −8 |
| 2 | (United States) Jerry McGee | 68-70=138 | −6 |
| T3 | (United States) Jack Nicklaus | 69-71=140 | −4 |
| T3 | (United States) Lanny Wadkins | 69-71=140 | −4 |
| T5 | (United States) Charles Coody | 70-71=141 | −3 |
| T5 | (United States) Al Geiberger | 71-70=141 | −3 |
| T5 | (United States) Joe Inman | 72-69=141 | −3 |
| T5 | (United States) Tom Watson | 68-73=141 | −3 |
| T9 | (United States) George Cadle | 69-73=142 | −2 |
| T9 | (United States) Gil Morgan | 74-68=142 | −2 |
| T9 | (United States) Fuzzy Zoeller | 70-72=142 | −2 |

=== Third round ===
Saturday, August 13, 1977

| Place | Player | Score | To par |
|---|---|---|---|
| 1 | (United States) Gene Littler | 67-69-70=206 | −10 |
| 2 | (United States) Jack Nicklaus | 69-71-70=210 | −6 |
| 3 | (United States) Charles Coody | 70-71-70=211 | −5 |
| T4 | (United States) George Cadle | 69-73-70=212 | −4 |
| T4 | (United States) Gil Morgan | 74-68-70=212 | −4 |
| T4 | (United States) Jerry Pate | 73-70-69=212 | −4 |
| T4 | (United States) Lanny Wadkins | 69-71-72=212 | −4 |
| T4 | (United States) Tom Watson | 68-73-71=212 | −4 |
| T9 | (United States) Miller Barber | 77-68-69=214 | −2 |
| T9 | (United States) Billy Casper | 73-71-70=214 | −2 |
| T9 | (United States) Al Geiberger | 71-70-73=214 | −2 |
| T9 | (United States) Joe Inman | 72-69-73=214 | −2 |
| T9 | (United States) Don January | 75-69-70=214 | −2 |
| T9 | (United States) Leonard Thompson | 72-73-69=214 | −2 |

=== Final round ===
Sunday, August 14, 1977

Littler, 47, was the leader in each of the first three rounds and entered Sunday at 206 (−10), with a four-shot lead over Jack Nicklaus. One-under on the front nine, Littler staggered on the back with a five-over 41. After the turn, he made five bogeys in six holes, then rallied with pars on the three finishing holes to make the playoff with a 76 (+4). Wadkins started the round six strokes back and shot a 70, which included a birdie on the par-5 18th hole to get to six-under for the championship. As the clubhouse leader, he waited for the final pairing of Nicklaus and Littler. Tied for the lead at 6-under with two holes remaining, Nicklaus's tee shot on the par-3 17th landed on the downslope over the front bunker and bounced into the heavy rough which led to a long par putt and a subsequent bogey. He had famously birdied the same hole in the final round of the 1972 U.S. Open, which he won by three strokes. Nicklaus then needed a birdie on 18th to tie Wadkins, but Jack's third shot into 18 came up 25 feet short and his birdie bid missed on the right. Playing in the final group behind Nicklaus, Littler's tee shot on the par-3 17th also landed on the downslope and bounced into the rough -- but Littler was able to salvage par by holing a 12-footer to remain 6-under. On the 18th, Littler's birdie putt from 20 feet past the hole to win the Championship outright stopped less than a foot short.

| Place | Player | Score | To par | Money ($) |
|---|---|---|---|---|
| T1 | (United States) Gene Littler | 67-69-70-76=282 | −6 | Playoff |
| T1 | (United States) Lanny Wadkins | 69-71-72-70=282 | −6 | Playoff |
| 3 | (United States) Jack Nicklaus | 69-71-70-73=283 | −5 | 15,000 |
| 4 | (United States) Charles Coody | 70-71-70-73=284 | −4 | 12,000 |
| 5 | (United States) Jerry Pate | 73-70-69-73=285 | −3 | 10,000 |
| T6 | (United States) Al Geiberger | 71-70-73-72=286 | −2 | 7,300 |
| T6 | (United States) Lou Graham | 71-73-71-71=286 | −2 | 7,300 |
| T6 | (United States) Don January | 75-69-70-72=286 | −2 | 7,300 |
| T6 | (United States) Jerry McGee | 68-70-77-71=286 | −2 | 7,300 |
| T6 | (United States) Tom Watson | 68-73-71-74=286 | −2 | 7,300 |

=== Playoff ===
The sudden-death playoff began on the par-4 first hole, where Wadkins missed the green, chipped from the heavy rough to 20 feet (6 m) and saved par to tie. At the second hole, both reached the green of the par-5 in two shots, narrowly missed eagle putts, and tapped in for birdies. At the third hole, both missed the green in the heavy rough. Littler's difficult chip left him 20 feet (6 m) for a par four, while Wadkins got his chip to within five feet (1.5 m). After Littler missed to the right, Wadkins rolled his in for the win.

The championship had gone without a playoff since 1967. The seventh and last sudden-death playoff was in 1996; the format was changed to a three-hole aggregate, first used in 2000.

| Place | Player | Score | To par | Money ($) |
|---|---|---|---|---|
| 1 | (United States) Lanny Wadkins | 4-4-4 | −1 | 45,000 |
| 2 | (United States) Gene Littler | 4-4-x | E | 25,000 |

- Sudden-death playoff played on holes 1, 2, and 3.
