= 2010 U.S. Open (golf) =

Coordinates: 36.568°N 121.950°W

Tournament information
- Dates: June 17–20, 2010
- Location: Pebble Beach, California
- Course: Pebble Beach Golf Links
- Organized by: USGA
- Tours: PGA Tour; European Tour; Japan Golf Tour

Statistics
- Par: 71
- Length: 7,040 yards (6,437 m)
- Field: 156, 83 after cut
- Cut: 149 (+7)
- Prize fund: $7,500,000 €6,244,277
- Winner's share: $1,350,000 €1,123,970

Champion
- (Northern Ireland) Graeme McDowell
- 284 (E)

The 2010 United States Open Championship was the 110th U.S. Open, held June 17–20 in Pebble Beach, California. Graeme McDowell of Northern Ireland won his first major title, one stroke ahead of runner-up Grégory Havret of France. McDowell was the first European to win the U.S. Open in forty years, since Tony Jacklin of England won in 1970. McDowell's win started a period in which four out of five U.S. Open champions between 2010 and 2014 were European. This was the fifth U.S. Open to be played at Pebble Beach Golf Links (it also hosted in 2000, 1992, 1982, and 1972).

== Course layout ==
Hole	1	2	3	4	5	6	7	8	9	Out	10	11	12	13	14	15	16	17	18	In	Total
Yards	380	502	404	331	195	523	109	428	505	3,377	495	390	202	445	580	397	403	208	543	3,663	7,040
Par	4	4	4	4	3	5	3	4	4	35	4	4	3	4	5	4	4	3	5	36	71

Location in the United States

Previous course lengths for major championships

- 6,846 yards (6,260 m) - par 71, 2000 U.S. Open
- 6,809 yards (6,226 m) - par 72, 1992 U.S. Open
- 6,825 yards (6,241 m) - par 72, 1982 U.S. Open
- 6,806 yards (6,223 m) - par 72, 1977 PGA Championship
- 6,812 yards (6,229 m) - par 72, 1972 U.S. Open

Prior to 2000, the 2nd hole was played as a par 5.

== Field ==
Location in California

About half the field each year consists of players who are fully exempt from qualifying for the U.S. Open. The players who qualified for the 2010 U.S. Open are listed below. Each player was classified according to the first category in which he qualified, but other categories are shown in parentheses.

1. Last 10 U.S. Open Champions

Ángel Cabrera (3,9,10,17), Michael Campbell, Jim Furyk (9,10,12,13,17), Lucas Glover (8,9,10,17), Retief Goosen (9,10,17), Geoff Ogilvy (9,10,11,17), Tiger Woods (4,5,8,9,10,13,17)

2. Top two finishers in the 2009 U.S. Amateur

An Byeong-hun (a), Ben Martin (a)

3. Last five Masters Champions

Trevor Immelman, Zach Johnson (9,10,17), Phil Mickelson (5,8,9,10,12,13,17)

4. Last five British Open Champions

Stewart Cink (9,10,17), Pádraig Harrington (5,9,10,11,17)

5. Last five PGA Champions

Yang Yong-eun (9,10,17)

6. Last three Players Champions

Tim Clark (9,12,17), Sergio García (8,11,17), Henrik Stenson (8,17)

7. The U.S. Senior Open Champion

Fred Funk

8. Top 15 finishers and ties in the 2009 U.S. Open

Stephen Ames, Ricky Barnes, Matt Bettencourt, David Duval, Ross Fisher (11,17), Søren Hansen, Hunter Mahan (9,10,17), Rory McIlroy (11,12,17), Ryan Moore, Mike Weir (9,10)

9. Top 30 leaders on the 2009 PGA Tour official money list

Paul Casey (11,14,17), Brian Gay (10), Dustin Johnson (10,12,17), Jerry Kelly (10), Matt Kuchar (12,17), Justin Leonard, Kevin Na (10,17), Sean O'Hair (10,17), Kenny Perry (10,17), Ian Poulter (11,14,17), John Rollins, Rory Sabbatini, John Senden (10), Steve Stricker (10,12,13,17), David Toms (10), Nick Watney (10,17)

10. All players qualifying for the 2009 edition of The Tour Championship

Luke Donald (17), Jason Dufner, Ernie Els (11,12,13,14,17), Marc Leishman, Steve Marino, Heath Slocum, Scott Verplank

11. Top 15 on the 2009 European Tour Race to Dubai

Simon Dyson, Martin Kaymer (17), Søren Kjeldsen, Ross McGowan, Francesco Molinari (17), Lee Westwood (14,17), Oliver Wilson (17)

12. Top 10 on the 2010 PGA Tour official money list through May 24, 2010 (the HP Byron Nelson Championship)

Robert Allenby (17), Camilo Villegas (17)

- Anthony Kim (17) did not play after undergoing thumb surgery.

13. Winners of multiple PGA Tour events between the end of the 2009 U.S. Open and the start of the 2010 U.S. Open

14. Top 5 from the 2010 European Tour Race to Dubai through May 24, 2010 (the BMW PGA Championship)

Charl Schwartzel (17)

15. Top 2 on the 2009 Japan Golf Tour official money list, provided they are within the top 75 point leaders of the Official World Golf Rankings at the end of 2009

Yuta Ikeda (17), Ryo Ishikawa (17)

16. Top 2 on the 2009 PGA Tour of Australasia official money list, provided they are within the top 75 point leaders of the Official World Golf Rankings at the end of 2009

Michael Sim (17)

- Alistair Presnell, ranked 376th, did not qualify.

17. Top 50 on the Official World Golf Rankings list as of May 24, 2010

K. J. Choi, Ben Crane, Peter Hanson, Thongchai Jaidee, Miguel Ángel Jiménez, Robert Karlsson, Graeme McDowell, Edoardo Molinari, Louis Oosthuizen, Álvaro Quirós, Adam Scott

18. Special exemptions selected by the USGA

Vijay Singh, Tom Watson

Sectional qualifiers

- Japan: Hiroyuki Fujita, Paul Sheehan, Toru Taniguchi, Kaname Yokoo
- England: Gary Boyd, Rafa Cabrera-Bello, Rhys Davies, Rafael Echenique, Grégory Havret, Mikko Ilonen, Rikard Karlberg, Jean-François Lucquin, Pablo Martín, Gareth Maybin, James Morrison
- United States

- Sacramento, California: Joseph Bramlett (a,L), Erick Justesen (L), Kenny Kim (L), Andrew Putnam (a,L)
- Littleton, Colorado: Stephen Allan, Jason Preeo (L)
- Hobe Sound, Florida: Travis Hampshire (L), Kevin Phelan (a,L), Gary Woodland
- Roswell, Georgia: Russell Henley (a,L), Mark Silvers (L)
- Woodstock, Illinois: Bennett Blakeman (a,L), Jerry Smith (L)
- Rockville, Maryland: Arjun Atwal, Craig Barlow, Jason Gore, Kent Jones, Daniel Summerhays (L), Ty Tryon (L), Steve Wheatcroft
- St. Louis, Missouri: Scott Langley (a,L)
- Summit, New Jersey: Jon Curran (L), Jim Herman, Dan McCarthy (L), Blaine Peffley (L)
- Columbus, Ohio: Stuart Appleby, Eric Axley, Aaron Baddeley, Alex Čejka, Ben Curtis, Brendon de Jonge, Harrison Frazar, Derek Lamely, Tom Lehman, Hugo León (L), Davis Love III, John Mallinger, Alex Martin (a,L), Terry Pilkadaris, Bo Van Pelt
- Springfield, Ohio: Erik Compton (L), Brian Davis, Noh Seung-yul
- Portland, Oregon: Jason Allred (L), Kent Eger (L), Matthew Richardson (L)
- Memphis, Tennessee: Rich Barcelo, David Frost, Paul Goydos, Mathias Grönberg, J. J. Henry, Morgan Hoffmann (a), Shaun Micheel, Deane Pappas, Brandt Snedeker, Chris Stroud, Hudson Swafford (a,L), Charles Warren
- The Woodlands, Texas: Bob Estes, Bobby Gates

Alternates who gained entry

- Azuma Yano (Japan) – replaced Anthony Kim
- Simon Khan (England) – claimed spot held for category 13
- Rocco Mediate (Columbus) – claimed spot held for category 13

(a) denotes amateur (L) denotes player advanced through local qualifying

== Round summaries ==
=== First round ===
Thursday, June 17, 2010

The 110th U.S. Open began on a sunny cool day on the Monterey Peninsula. Paul Casey, Shaun Micheel, and Brendon de Jonge all shot a 69 (−2) to lead after 18 holes. De Jonge holed out for eagle at the very difficult par-5 14th hole. Rafa Cabrera-Bello, K. J. Choi, Alex Čejka, Ryo Ishikawa, Mike Weir, and Ian Poulter all shot 70 (−1). The 2009 and 2010 AT&T Pebble Beach National Pro-Am winner Dustin Johnson shot an even par 71. Tiger Woods, who won the U.S. Open at Pebble Beach by 15 strokes in 2000, shot a birdie-free 74 (+3). Phil Mickelson, another of the favorites entering the tournament, struggled to a 75 (+4). This was the first time in over seven years, since the first round of the 2003 Masters, where neither Woods nor Mickelson made a birdie in a round of a major championship.

Place	Player	Score	To par
T1	(England) Paul Casey	69	−2
T1	(Zimbabwe) Brendon de Jonge	69	−2
T1	(United States) Shaun Micheel	69	−2
T4	(Spain) Rafa Cabrera-Bello	70	−1
T4	(Germany) Alex Čejka	70	−1
T4	(South Korea) K. J. Choi	70	−1
T4	(Japan) Ryo Ishikawa	70	−1
T4	(England) Ian Poulter	70	−1
T4	(Canada) Mike Weir	70	−1
T10	(England) Luke Donald	71	E
T10	(United States) Dustin Johnson	71	E
T10	(Northern Ireland) Graeme McDowell	71	E
T10	(United States) David Toms	71	E

=== Second round ===
Friday, June 18, 2010

McDowell shot a 68 (−3) to take the 36-hole lead at 139 (−3). Casey posted a 73 (+2) to move back to even par, as did de Jonge. Shaun Micheel shot a 77 (+6), with a double-hit on a chip shot on the first hole. Woods continued to struggle, with a 72 (+1) for 146 (+4). Among those at 141 (−1) were Ernie Els, Johnson, Ishikawa, and Mickelson. Mickelson shot 66 (−5) with a front nine charge with birdies at 2, 3, 4, 6, and 8. Notable players who missed the cut (+7) were Rory McIlroy, Hunter Mahan, and two-time heart transplant survivor Erik Compton, who was playing in his first major.

Place	Player	Score	To par
1	(Northern Ireland) Graeme McDowell	71-68=139	−3
T2	(South Africa) Ernie Els	73-68=141	−1
T2	(Japan) Ryo Ishikawa	70-71=141	−1
T2	(United States) Dustin Johnson	71-70=141	−1
T2	(United States) Phil Mickelson	75-66=141	−1
T6	(England) Paul Casey	69-73=142	E
T6	(Germany) Alex Čejka	70-72=142	E
T6	(Zimbabwe) Brendon de Jonge	69-73=142	E
T6	(United States) Jerry Kelly	72-70=142	E
T10	(South Korea) K. J. Choi	70-73=143	+1
T10	(Denmark) Søren Kjeldsen	72-71=143	+1
T10	(England) Ian Poulter	70-73=143	+1

- Amateurs (a): Langley (+2), Henley (+5), Hoffmann (+8), Swafford (+8), Bramlett (+11), An (+12), Putnam (+12), B. Martin (+13), Phelan (+16), A. Martin (+21), Blakeman (+24).

=== Third round ===
Saturday, June 19, 2010

Johnson stormed to five-under 66 for a 207 (−6) and a three shot lead over McDowell at 210. Johnson eagled the drivable fourth hole to go with birdies on 17 and 18. Woods shot a back nine 31, with birdies on the last three holes to get back in contention in solo third place at 212 (−1). Both Grégory Havret and Els finished at even par, six shots back of Johnson. Mickelson double bogeyed the 9th hole and struggled to a 73 (+2).

Place	Player	Score	To par
1	(United States) Dustin Johnson	71-70-66=207	−6
2	(Northern Ireland) Graeme McDowell	71-68-71=210	−3
3	(United States) Tiger Woods	74-72-66=212	−1
T4	(South Africa) Ernie Els	73-68-72=213	E
T4	(France) Grégory Havret	73-71-69=213	E
6	(United States) Phil Mickelson	75-66-73=214	+1
T7	(Germany) Alex Čejka	70-72-74=216	+3
T7	(South Africa) Tim Clark	72-72-72=216	+3
T7	(Japan) Ryo Ishikawa	70-71-75=216	+3
T10	(Germany) Martin Kaymer	74-71-72=217	+4
T10	(United States) Davis Love III	75-74-68=217	+4
T10	(United States) Sean O'Hair	76-71-70=217	+4

=== Final round ===
Sunday, June 20, 2010

Overnight leader Johnson quickly dropped out of contention with a triple-bogey on the second hole and a double on the third hole. Els was tied for the lead at a part of the round, but fell back eventually. Havret remained closely in contention, but McDowell ground out a round of 74 to win his first major championship.

Place	Player	Score	To par	Money ($)
1	(Northern Ireland) Graeme McDowell	71-68-71-74=284	E	1,350,000
2	(France) Grégory Havret	73-71-69-72=285	+1	810,000
3	(South Africa) Ernie Els	73-68-72-73=286	+2	480,687
T4	(United States) Phil Mickelson	75-66-73-73=287	+3	303,119
T4	(United States) Tiger Woods	74-72-66-75=287	+3	303,119
T6	(United States) Matt Kuchar	74-72-74-68=288	+4	228,255
T6	(United States) Davis Love III	75-74-68-71=288	+4	228,255
T8	(Germany) Alex Čejka	70-72-74-73=289	+5	177,534
T8	(United States) Dustin Johnson	71-70-66-82=289	+5	177,534
T8	(Germany) Martin Kaymer	74-71-72-72=289	+5	177,534
T8	(United States) Brandt Snedeker	75-74-69-71=289	+5	177,534

- Amateurs: Henley (+8), Langley (+8)

==== Scorecard ====
Final round

Hole	1	2	3	4	5	6	7	8	9	10	11	12	13	14	15	16	17	18
Par	4	4	4	4	3	5	3	4	4	4	4	3	4	5	4	4	3	5
(Northern Ireland) McDowell	−3	−3	−3	−3	−4	−4	−4	−4	−3	−2	−2	−2	−2	−1	−1	−1	E	E
(France) Havret	−1	−1	−1	−1	−1	−2	−2	−1	−1	E	E	E	E	E	E	E	+1	+1
(South Africa) Els	E	−1	−1	−2	−2	−3	−3	−3	−2	E	+1	E	E	+1	+1	+1	+2	+2
(United States) Mickelson	E	E	E	E	E	E	E	E	E	+1	+1	+1	+1	+2	+2	+3	+3	+3
(United States) Woods	E	E	E	+1	+1	+2	+1	+2	+2	+3	+3	+4	+4	+3	+3	+3	+3	+3
(United States) Love lll	+4	+3	+3	+3	+3	+1	+1	+1	+1	+2	+1	+2	+2	+3	+3	+3	+5	+4
(United States) Kuchar	+6	+6	+6	+5	+5	+4	+4	+5	+5	+4	+4	+4	+4	+4	+4	+4	+4	+4
(Germany) Kaymer	+4	+4	+3	+2	+1	+2	+2	+3	+3	+3	+3	+4	+5	+5	+4	+5	+5	+5
(United States) D. Johnson	−6	−3	−1	E	E	E	+1	+1	+1	+1	+2	+3	+3	+3	+3	+4	+5	+5
(Germany) Cejka	+3	+3	+3	+3	+3	+2	+2	+2	+2	+3	+3	+3	+3	+4	+4	+4	+5	+5
(United States) Snedeker	+6	+7	+7	+6	+7	+6	+6	+6	+7	+6	+5	+4	+4	+4	+3	+3	+4	+5
(South Africa) Clark	+3	+3	+3	+3	+3	+2	+2	+2	+3	+3	+4	+4	+5	+6	+6	+7	+6	+6
(United States) O'Hair	+4	+4	+4	+4	+4	+3	+4	+4	+4	+5	+5	+6	+6	+6	+6	+6	+6	+6
(Japan) Ishikawa	+4	+4	+4	+6	+6	+7	+7	+9	+9	+8	+9	+9	+9	+10	+11	+12	+12	+12

Cumulative tournament scores, relative to par

Double Eagle	Eagle	Birdie	Bogey	Double bogey	Triple bogey+
