= National Golf Club of Kansas City =

Golf club in Missouri, U.S.

Coordinates: 39°13′08″N 94°42′43″W

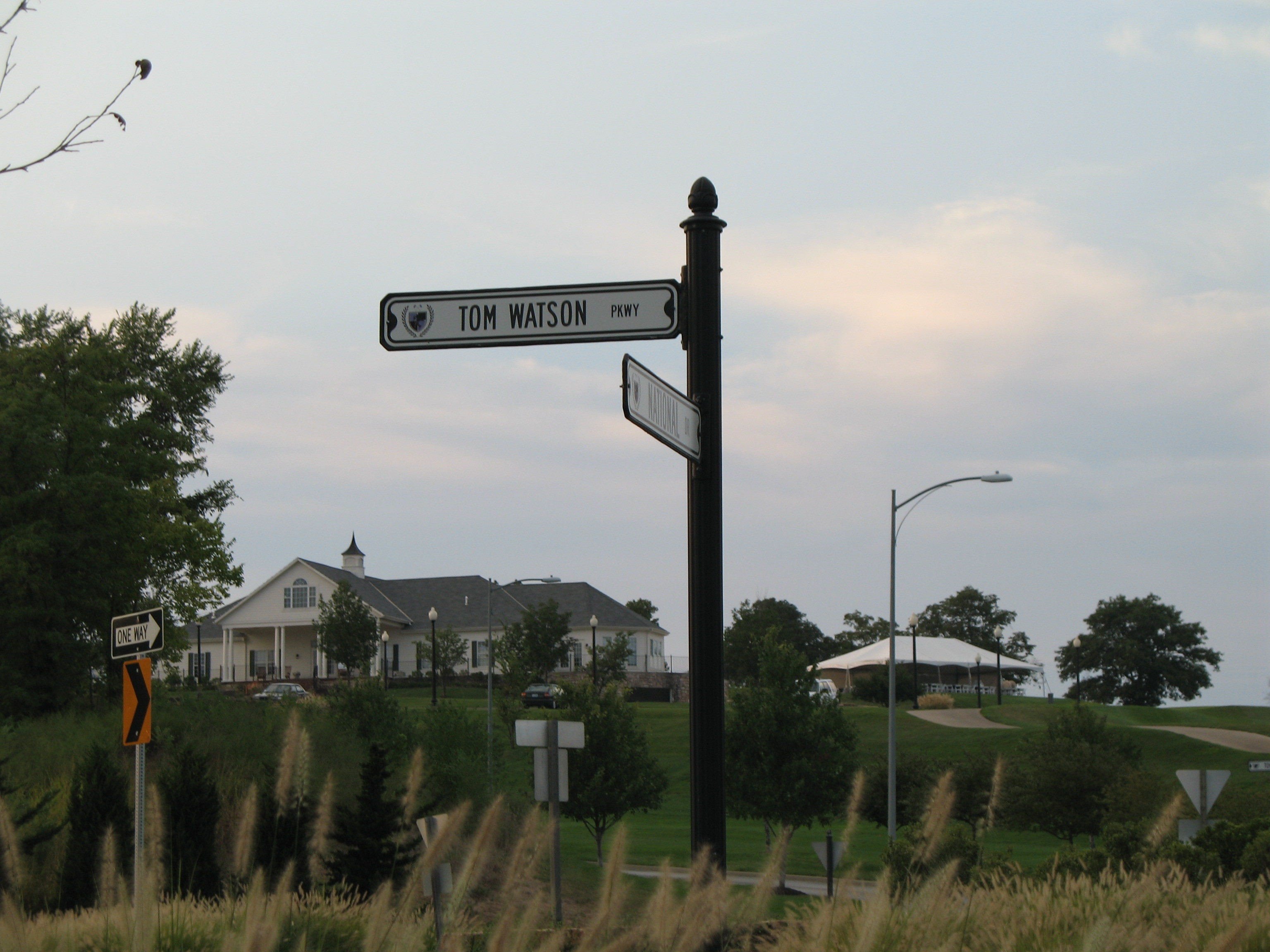
Tom Watson Parkway Sign and National Golf Club

The National Golf Club of Kansas City is a golf club located in the Parkville, Missouri, a suburb of Kansas City, Missouri. The golf course was designed by champion golfer Tom Watson, a native of Kansas City, Missouri. For two years (2003–04) the club hosted the Senior PGA's Bayer Advantage golf tournament. It originally featured two golf courses, the north side or "The National", and the south side or "The Deuce".

In 2021, the National Golf Club of Kansas City and The Deuce were acquired by ClubCorp. In 2024, The Deuce was renamed and rebranded as The Bluffs.
