= Katelyn Clampett =

American country singer-songwriter

- Origin: Nashville, Tennessee, U.S.
- Genres: Country; country pop
- Occupation: Singer-songwriter
- Instruments: Vocals; guitar; keyboard
- Years active: 2010–present
- Labels: Creative Artists Agency
- Website: katelynclampett.com
- Parent: Bobby Clampett (father)

Katelyn Clampett is an American country singer-songwriter and music producer.

== Early life and education ==
Clampett is the daughter of professional golfer Bobby Clampett. She grew up in Cary, North Carolina and attended St. David's School, a private Episcopal day school in Raleigh. She won a scholarship to study music at the Berklee College of Music.

== Career ==
In 2010, Clampett auditioned for the 9th season of American Idol, making it to the Top 12. She later performed as a background singer on tour for Selena Gomez & the Scene and as a background singer, vocal arranger, guitarist, and keyboardist for Victoria Justice and Ariana Grande.

Clampett went on to sign with Creative Artists Agency as a country singer and performed as an opening act for Dan + Shay, Gloriana, Kip Moore, Frankie Ballard, Love and Theft, and David Nail.

Her songs have been featured on Dancing With The Stars, Britain’s Got Talent, and CBS Sports.

In 2022, she released the single "Hang Up and Hang Out".

In 2024, she had a residency at the Bowery Vault in East Nashville. She released the single "Aspen" on December 13, 2024.

In 2025, Clampett launched Herd Music Group, a woman-operated music production house in Nashville, Tennessee.

== Personal life ==
Clampett married her husband, Jon, at the Kona Village Resort in Hawaii in 2024.

She lives in Nashville, Tennessee.

== Discography ==
=== Singles ===
- "Love Lifted Me (Jesus Saves)" (2013)
- "The Trouble With the Truth" (2017)
- "Home for Christmas" (2018)
- "Board In Quarantine" (2020)
- "Need You Now - Quarantine Edition" (2020)
- "Hang Up and Hang Out" (2022)
- "Sorta Single" (2022)
- "Summer Mashup (Soak Up the Sun, Girls Just Wanna Have Fun, Sunshine and Summertime)" (2022)
- "S.L.U.T.S." (2024)
- "ASPEN" (2024)
- "WHITE GIRLS ON BROADWAY" (2024)
- "TIL DEATH DO US PARTY" (2024)
- "Kanye and TSwift" (2024)
- "Happy To See You" (2024)
- "The Country Cybertruck Song" (2025)
