= Tom Watson (golfer) =

American professional golfer (born 1949)

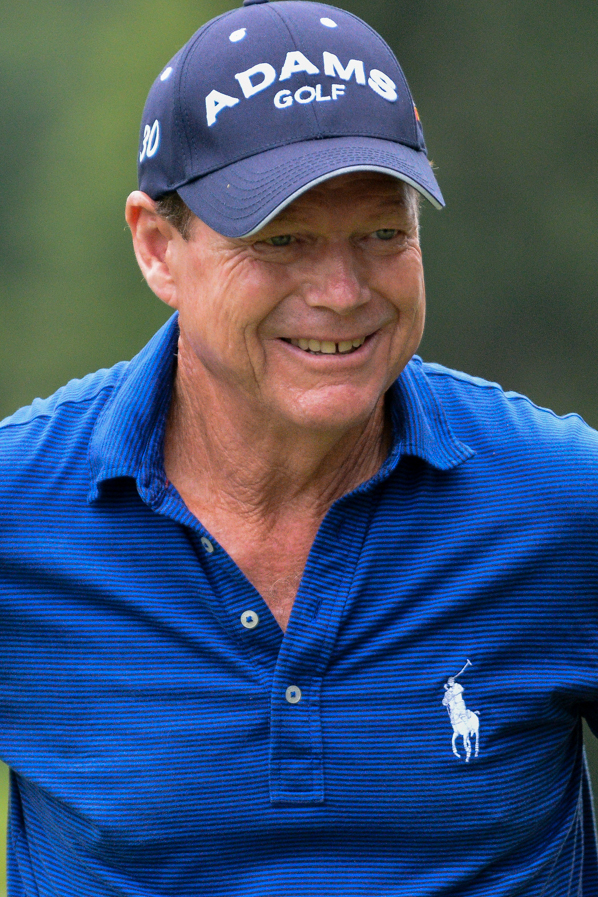
- Watson at the 2013 Greenbrier Classic Pro-Am Day.

Personal information
- Full name: Thomas Sturges Watson
- Nationality: United States
- Born: September 4, 1949 (age 77) Kansas City, Missouri, U.S.
- Height: 5 ft 9 in (175 cm)
- Weight: 175 lb (79 kg)
- Spouses: Linda Rubin (m. 1972; div. 1997) Hilary Watson (m. 1999; died 2019) LeslieAnne Wade (m. 2022; sep. 2022) Dorothy Cohen (m. 2024)
- Children: 5

Career
- Sport: Golf
- College: Stanford University
- Turned professional: 1971
- Former tours: PGA Tour; European Tour; PGA Tour Champions; European Seniors Tour
- Professional wins: 70

Number of wins by tour
- PGA Tour: 39 (Tied-10th all-time)
- European Tour: 8
- Japan Golf Tour: 4
- Asian Tour: 1
- PGA Tour of Australasia: 1
- PGA Tour Champions: 14
- Other: 11

Best results in major championships (wins: 8)
- Masters Tournament: Won: 1977, 1981
- PGA Championship: T2: 1978
- U.S. Open: Won: 1982
- The Open Championship: Won: 1975, 1977, 1980, 1982, 1983

Achievements and awards
- World Golf Hall of Fame: 1988 (member page)
- PGA Tour money list winner: 1977, 1978, 1979, 1980, 1984
- PGA Player of the Year: 1977, 1978, 1979, 1980, 1982, 1984
- Vardon Trophy: 1977, 1978, 1979
- Bob Jones Award: 1987
- Old Tom Morris Award: 1992
- Payne Stewart Award: 2003
- Champions Tour Charles Schwab Cup winner: 2003, 2005
- Champions Tour money list winner: 2003
- Champions Tour Player of the Year: 2003
- Champions Tour Byron Nelson Award: 2003

Thomas Sturges Watson (born September 4, 1949) is an American professional golfer. In the 1970s and 1980s, Watson was one of the leading golfers in the world, winning eight major championships and heading the PGA Tour money list five times. He was the number one player in the world according to McCormack's World Golf Rankings from 1978 until 1982; in both 1983 and 1984, he was ranked second behind Seve Ballesteros. He also spent 32 weeks in the top 10 of the successor Sony Rankings in their debut in 1986.

Watson is also notable for his longevity: at nearly sixty years of age, and 26 years after his last major championship victory, he led after the second and third rounds of The Open Championship in 2009, but lost in a four-hole playoff. With a chance to win the tournament with par on the 72nd hole, he missed an 8-foot (2.4 m) putt, then lost to Stewart Cink in the playoff.

Several of Watson's major victories came at the expense of Jack Nicklaus, the man he replaced as number one, most notably the 1977 Masters, 1977 Open Championship, and the 1982 U.S. Open. Though his rivalry with Nicklaus was intense, their friendly competitiveness served to increase golf's popularity at the time.

In Watson's career, his eight major wins include five Open Championships, two Masters titles, and one U.S. Open title. In all, Watson's eight majors ranks sixth on the list of total major championship victories, behind only Nicklaus, Tiger Woods, Walter Hagen, Ben Hogan, and Gary Player.

Watson is also regarded as one of the greatest links players of all time, a claim backed up by his five Open Championship victories, his runner-up finishes at the 1984 Open Championship and 2009 Open Championship, and his three Senior British Open Championship titles in his mid-50s (2003, 2005, and 2007).

Watson played on four Ryder Cup teams and captained the American side to victory in 1993 at The Belfry in England. More than twenty years later, Watson again captained the U.S. Team in 2014 in Scotland, this time in a loss.

== Early life ==
Watson was born in Kansas City, Missouri. He was introduced to the game by his father, Ray. His early coach was Stan Thirsk at the Kansas City Country Club. Watson first gained local renown while on his high school team at The Pembroke-Country Day School in Kansas City.

== Amateur career ==
Watson won four Missouri State Amateur championships: in 1967, 1968, 1970, and 1971. He attended Stanford University, playing on the golf and table tennis teams, and joined Alpha Sigma Phi. He graduated with a degree in psychology in 1971.

== Professional career ==
=== PGA Tour ===
Watson joined the PGA Tour in 1971. He hired Bruce Edwards to be his caddie for the first time at the 1973 St. Louis tournament held at Norwood Hills Country Club, and the two connected, with Edwards caddying for Watson at most events after that for a period of many years.

Watson contended in a major championship for the first time at the U.S. Open in 1974 at Winged Foot, but he faded badly in the final round after having the 54-hole lead. Following this disappointment, Watson was approached in the locker room by legendary retired player Byron Nelson, a broadcaster at the event, who offered encouragement, insight and assistance. Nelson and Watson spoke briefly at that time, with Nelson saying he liked Watson's game and aggressiveness, and offered to help him improve. Watson, although disappointed by his weak finish, was flattered to receive Nelson's interest. However, the two men did not manage to get together to work on golf in depth until several months later, when Watson played in the Tour's Byron Nelson Classic in the Dallas area, and visited Nelson's nearby home. The two men would eventually develop a close and productive teacher-student relationship and friendship; Nelson had similarly mentored the young rising star Ken Venturi during the 1950s.

Only two weeks after the Winged Foot collapse in 1974, Watson won his first Tour title at the Western Open near Chicago, coming from six shots back in the final round at Butler National. With Nelson's guidance on swing mechanics and course management, and determined hard work, Watson's game advanced quickly, and he won his first major championship, the 1975 Open Championship, on his first appearance in the event in Britain. Watson holed a 20-foot putt for a birdie on the 72nd hole to tie Jack Newton. The following day Watson won an 18-hole playoff at Carnoustie by a stroke, carding a 71 to Newton's 72. Watson was able to gain the upper hand in the playoff after chipping in for an eagle at the 14th hole. Watson is one of only four players since World War II to have won the Open Championship on their debut, the others being Ben Hogan (1953), Tony Lema (1964) and Ben Curtis (2003).

Watson won his second major championship and his first green jacket as Masters champion in 1977 after a duel with Jack Nicklaus. During the final round, Watson stood on the 17th green tied with Nicklaus for the lead. Watson holed a 20-foot putt for a birdie to go one stroke ahead of Nicklaus. Watson's par on the 18th hole won him the Masters title by two strokes after Nicklaus had a bogey on the 18th.

Watson's 1977 Open Championship victory, at Turnberry in Scotland, was especially memorable, and is considered by many to be the finest tournament played in the second half of the 20th century. After two rounds, he and Jack Nicklaus were one shot out of the lead and paired for the third round. Both shot 65, ending the third round three shots clear of the field. Watson and Nicklaus were again paired for the final round. On the last day, the two were tied after 16 holes. Nicklaus missed a makeable birdie putt on 17, losing his share of the lead to Watson, who birdied 17. On the 18th, Nicklaus drove into the rough, while Watson drove the fairway. Watson's approach landed two feet from the flag, while Nicklaus, after a drive into deep rough and near a gorse plant, managed to get his approach 40 feet away. Nicklaus sank his birdie putt to finish with a 66, but Watson followed suit with his own birdie, finishing with a second straight 65 and his second Open, with a record score of 268 (12 under par). The two players finished well ahead of the other challengers (Hubert Green in third place was ten strokes behind Nicklaus, at 279), and shot the same score every round except for the final day, which was then played on Saturday.

In 1978, as defending Masters champion, Watson needed a par on the 18th hole of his final round to tie over 72 holes with Gary Player, who had shot a record-tying final round of 64. However, Watson missed out on a playoff by sending his approach shot to the 18th into the gallery and missing the 10-foot par putt he needed for a playoff. He finished tied for 2nd place at Augusta, one stroke behind Gary Player. Watson had five PGA Tour victories in 1978, but he also had one of the biggest disappointments of his career in that year's PGA Championship in August at Oakmont. Watson had a five-shot lead after 54 holes, but lost the tournament in a 3-way sudden-death playoff to John Mahaffey. This would be the closest that Watson came to landing the one major title that eluded him.

In 1979, Watson had a further five PGA Tour victories, including a five-shot victory in the Sea Pines Heritage Classic, which he won with a then tournament record 14-under par 270. Watson again finished runner-up at the Masters in 1979, when he lost in a 3-way sudden-death playoff to Fuzzy Zoeller. This was the first sudden-death playoff at the Masters, with the previous playoff at Augusta in 1970 having taken place on Monday under an 18-hole format. Watson also finished 2nd in The Players Championship in 1979.

Watson had an outstanding year in 1980. A brilliant third round of 64 at Muirfield helped him to win his third Open Championship title in Britain by four strokes. He was the leading money winner on the PGA Tour for the fourth consecutive year, winning six tournaments in America. Watson showed tremendous consistency in 1980, with sixteen top-10 finishes on the PGA Tour that year. In August 1980, after his sixth victory of the year in America, Watson said: "I love this game. I feel that dedication is the only way to improve. I've been more consistent this year than in the previous three years."

In 1981, Watson won his second Masters title at Augusta by two strokes over Jack Nicklaus and Johnny Miller. Watson had a further two Tour victories in 1981 at the USF&G New Orleans Open and the Atlanta Classic.

In 1982 at Pebble Beach, he was able to emerge victorious after an engaging duel with Jack Nicklaus in one of the most memorable major championships of all time. Playing three groups ahead of Watson in the final round, Nicklaus charged into a share of the lead with five consecutive birdies. When Watson reached the par-3 17th hole, the two were still tied, but with Nicklaus safely in the clubhouse at 4-under par 284. Watson hit his tee shot on the 17th into the rough just off the green, leaving an extremely difficult chip shot downhill on a very fast green. While being interviewed on national television and fully aware of Watson's perilous predicament, Nicklaus appeared confident he was on his way to an unprecedented fifth U.S. Open championship. Watson's chip shot hit the flag stick and fell into the cup, giving him a birdie and setting the stage for yet another win over Nicklaus. Watson went on to birdie the 18th as well, for a final margin of two shots.

The following month in July 1982 at Royal Troon in Scotland, Watson became only the third golfer since World War II to win the U.S. Open and Open Championship in the same year after Ben Hogan (1953) and Lee Trevino (1971) - a feat later matched by Tiger Woods (2000). After the first two rounds of the 1982 Open Championship, Watson was seven shots behind the leader Bobby Clampett, whose commanding lead was reduced after a third round of 78. During the final round, Nick Price, who was playing in one of the groups behind Watson, gained the lead. Watson stood on the 18th tee of the final round two strokes behind Price. Watson waited patiently after his round as Price's lead evaporated, leaving Watson the Open winner by one stroke.

In 1983, as defending U.S. Open champion at Oakmont, Watson shared the 54-hole lead with Seve Ballesteros. In the final round though, Watson missed a 6-foot putt for par on the 17th and finished in 2nd place, one stroke behind the winner Larry Nelson. The following month in July 1983, Watson won his fifth Open Championship and the last of his eight majors at Royal Birkdale, his only Open victory on English soil. (His four other titles came in Scotland.)

In 1984, Watson finished runner-up for the third time at the Masters, finishing two strokes behind the champion Ben Crenshaw. Watson had three Tour wins in 1984, including his third victory in the Western Open after a playoff against Greg Norman. A fortnight later in the 1984 Open Championship at St Andrews, Watson was in contention during the final holes to win a third consecutive Open and a sixth Open Championship overall to tie the record for the most Open wins by Harry Vardon. However, Watson bogeyed the par-4 "Road Hole" 17th and Seve Ballesteros birdied the 18th, resulting in a victory for Ballesteros and Watson finishing in a tie for 2nd place.

After his runner-up finish in the 1984 British Open, Watson did not manage to win a PGA Tour event for the next three years until the 1987 Nabisco Championship. Watson went from being the PGA Tour money leader in 1984 to finishing 18th on the PGA Tour's money list in 1985. As a result of a decline in form, Watson missed out on a place in the 1985 U.S. Ryder Cup team.

In the 1986 Hawaiian Open, Watson was the third-round leader and was aiming to end his winless streak since July 1984. However, Watson bogeyed the 71st and 72nd holes and finished in a tie for 3rd place, behind the winner Corey Pavin.

In the 1987 U.S. Open, Watson had a one-shot lead going into the final round at the Olympic Club. Watson was a gallery favorite during the tournament. He had strong support from the spectators having played golf for Stanford University, 30 miles south of the Olympic Club in San Francisco. He was aiming to win his ninth major championship, which would have tied him for major wins with Ben Hogan and Gary Player, but Watson lost the tournament by a stroke to Scott Simpson. In the final round, Simpson had three consecutive birdies on the back-nine to take the lead. Watson's 45-foot putt for a birdie on the 72nd hole which would have forced a playoff with Simpson was about two inches short.

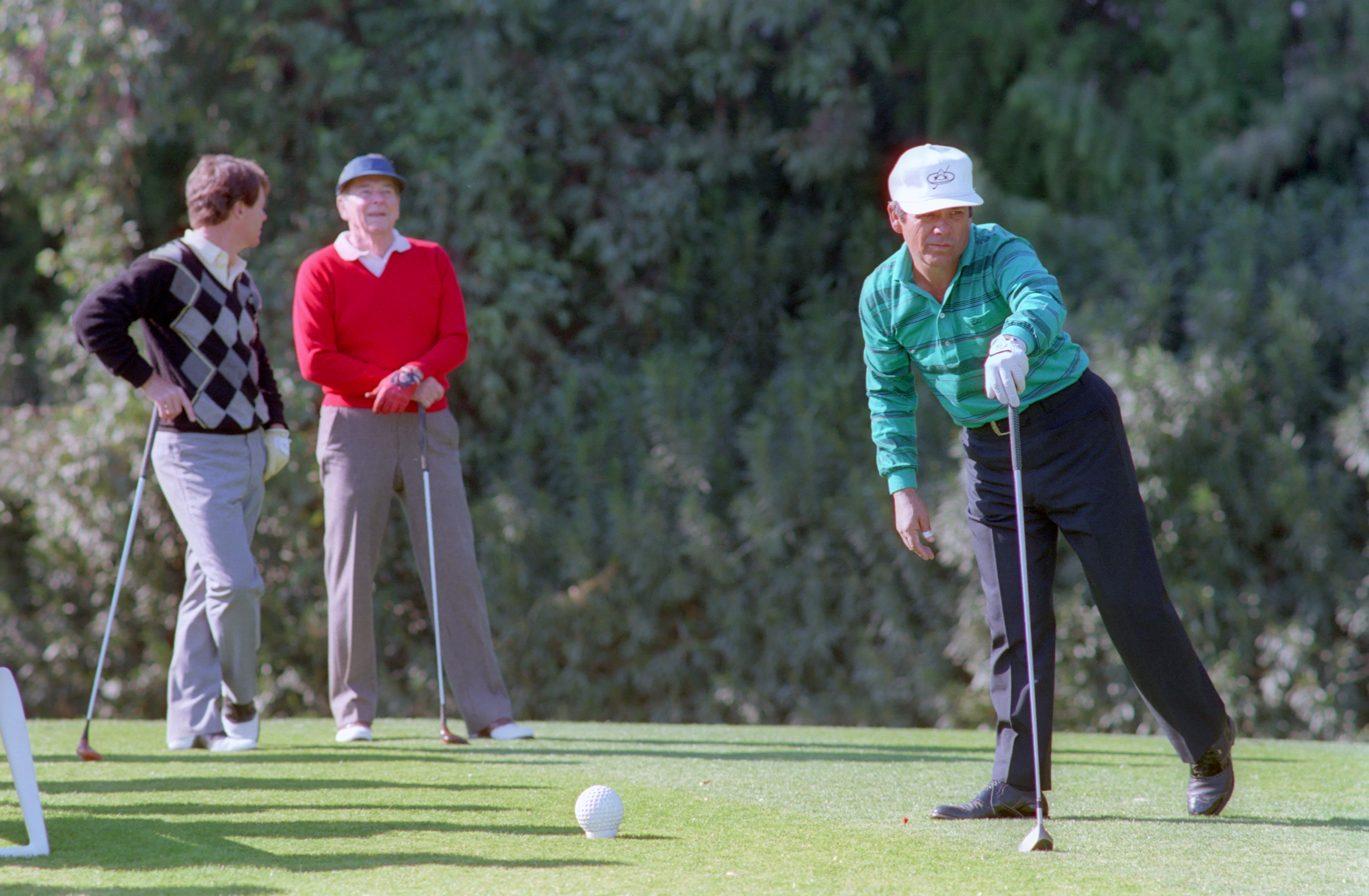
Watson (left) with President Ronald Reagan and Lee Trevino in 1988.

Watson's stellar play on the PGA Tour faded in the late 1980s when he began to have problems putting even though his tee-to-green game seemed to improve. During this period he had some near-misses in tournaments. Watson finished 2nd at the 1988 NEC World Series of Golf, missing a 3-foot putt in a playoff against Mike Reid.

In 1989, Watson was in contention during the Open Championship at Royal Troon, but he finished in 4th place, two strokes outside the playoff between Mark Calcavecchia, Wayne Grady and Greg Norman.

At the 1991 Masters Tournament, Watson stood on the 18th tee in the final round at Augusta with a share of the lead but had a double-bogey 6 to finish in a tie for 3rd place, two strokes behind the champion Ian Woosnam. It was Watson's 15th consecutive top-20 finish at The Masters, having finished in the top-10 of The Masters in 13 of the 15 years between 1977 and 1991.

In 1994, when The Open Championship returned to Turnberry, the site of his 1977 victory, Watson commented, "Sometimes you lose your desire through the years. Any golfer goes through that. When you play golf for a living, like anything in your life, you are never going to be constantly, at the top". He finished tied for 11th at the Open Championship that year, but he had a revival in the late 1990s, winning the 1996 Memorial Tournament and gaining the last of his 39 wins on the PGA Tour at the 1998 MasterCard Colonial when he was 48 years old.

In 1997, Watson won the Japan Golf Tour's Dunlop Phoenix tournament for the second time. It was the last of his four victories in Japan.

=== Champions Tour ===
In 1999, Watson joined the Champions Tour. He has 14 wins on the Champions Tour, including six senior majors, while playing a limited schedule of events. Watson shares with Gary Player and Bernhard Langer three victories for each in the Senior Open Championship. Watson revisited his 1977 Open Championship win at Turnberry with another win there in the 2003 Senior Open Championship. He followed this up with victories in 2005 and 2007.

Since he turned 50, Watson has also had some success in the regular major championships. At the 2003 U.S. Open, at age 53, he shared the opening-round lead by shooting a 65 with his long-time caddy Bruce Edwards carrying his clubs and giving advice. Edwards had been diagnosed with Lou Gehrig's disease earlier in the year, and Watson contributed significant time and money that year with Edwards to raise money for research into finding a cure for motor neuron disease. Edwards died on April 8, 2004.

During his senior career, Watson is probably best known for his performance at the 2009 Open Championship. In the first round of the event, held at Turnberry, Watson shot a 5-under 65, one stroke behind the leader Miguel Ángel Jiménez. In the second round, he tied for the lead after making a huge putt on the 18th green. His score for the round was 70, 38 out and 32 back. This made Watson – at 59 years of age – the oldest man to have the lead after any round of a major. In addition, with a relatively low-scoring third round, one-over-par 71, he kept the lead outright by one shot, so also became the oldest player to lead a major going into the last round. He acknowledged after that 3rd round he was thinking of Bruce Edwards as he walked the 18th fairway. Watson finished regulation 72-hole play in the Open tied for the lead with Stewart Cink, with a cumulative score of −2. He needed a par on the 72nd hole to capture a sixth career Open Championship title, but his second shot, who Watson mentioned as 'I like it' when he hit it, landed on a hard spot near the front of the green, on the 72nd hole and went over the green. Then, from several yards behind the 18th green, Watson first putted up the slope and past the hole, then missed a second 8-foot putt by about 6 inches to the right of the cup. His bogey led to a four-hole aggregate playoff with Cink, running through the 5th, 6th, 17th, and 18th holes. With several errant shots not typical of the previous 72 holes, he lost the playoff by six strokes. In an interview in 2012, Watson admitted that he was "distraught" at coming so close to becoming the oldest Major winner at the age of 59 and said that the experience in the 2009 Open Championship "tore his guts out". Watson said of his approach shot to the green at the 72nd hole, when he needed a par to win the Open: "I was going right at the flag but with the uncertainty of links golf, maybe a gust of wind took it a bit further than it was supposed to. I felt extreme disappointment that night but the one good thing that came of that was the response of people around the world."

The following April, Watson competed in the 2010 Masters Tournament. Watson shot an opening-round 67, one shot off the first-round lead held by fellow Champions Tour player Fred Couples. Watson subsequently posted rounds of 74, 73, and 73. His 72-hole, one-under-par total of 287 gave Watson a share of eighteenth place. The USGA awarded Watson a special exemption to the 2010 U.S. Open at Pebble Beach, to mark his victory at the same venue in the 1982 U.S. Open and his performances in recent majors. He finished the tournament tied for 29th.

For the 2015 Open Championship, Watson's exemption for his 2009 finish was extended to give him an opportunity to play at St. Andrews and make one final Open appearance. Watson won Open Championships at five different courses, but St. Andrews was not among them. He missed the cut and made an emotional walk across the Swilcan Bridge at twilight. In April 2016, he played in his final Masters. After saying in the lead up to the event that he 'couldn't compete' anymore, Watson missed the cut by two strokes.

Despite no longer competing at the full Masters, Watson won the 2018 Masters Tournament Par-3 contest at the age of 68, the oldest ever to win the event.

In July 2019, Watson played his final competitive event on British soil, when he played in the Senior British Open for the final time.

== Playing style ==
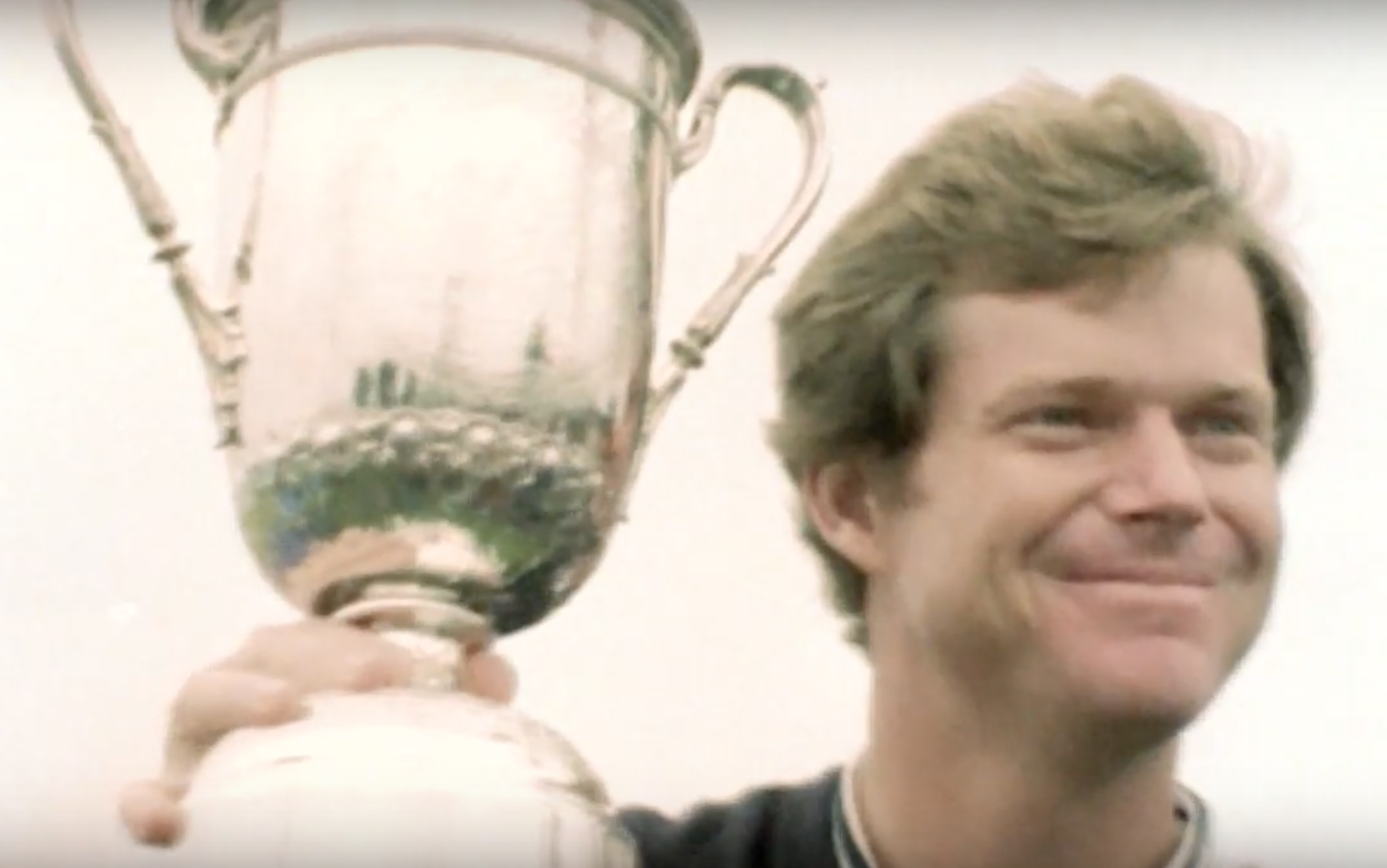
Watson after winning the 1982 U.S. Open at Pebble Beach Golf Links

Years later, if a player escaped from trouble and somehow made par, tour players described the escape as a "Watson par".

Watson also developed a reputation for scrupulous honesty, once even calling a penalty stroke on himself for slightly moving a ball that was in deep rough, although no one else had seen it. In 1991, Watson was critical of the heckling of his playing partner Ian Woosnam during the final round of the Masters. Some of the Augusta crowd were vociferous in their support for Watson, in the hope of seeing him win a third Masters title. Watson, however, calmed Woosnam after he was upset at being yelled at by a member of the crowd on the 14th tee. Watson later said: "There's been a breakdown in decorum, and I don't feel good when partisanship spills over."

In 2010, Watson said that he agreed with Lee Westwood's assertion that Tour players who used 20-year-old Ping-Eye 2 wedges to get around new rules prohibiting box grooves (i.e., grooves rectangular [including square] or U-shaped in cross-section) were going against "the spirit of the game." Watson also reprimanded Tiger Woods for his "language and club-throwing" and said that Woods needed to "show humility" to the public.

Watson has been outspoken about the effect that too much prize money can have on some golfers. In an interview in 2010, Watson said: "I do believe that, in certain instances, players can be corrupted by the amount of money they make. I think too much money corrupts the desire and for some players it's about how much money they make rather than just trying to be the best player they can."

== Personal life ==
In 1972, Watson married Linda Rubin. They had two children. In 1997, they divorced. Two years later, he married Hilary Watson. They were married for twenty years until her death in 2019. Three years after her death, in 2022, he married Leslie Anne Wade. However, they separated later in the year.

Watson was a member of Kansas City Country Club from the beginning of his professional career. However, in 1990 he was unsettled by the idea that the leaders of the club rejected an applicant due to his Jewish faith. Watson, whose wife at the time and two children were Jewish, stated, "It was a very personal decision. I just didn't feel my family was welcome. It was time to say, 'Hey, let's be fair to people. Let's not judge people on the basis of race or faith.'" Watson abruptly resigned in 1990. However the Jewish applicant, H&R Block founder Henry W. Bloch, was ultimately admitted to the club as were other minorities. Disarmed by these overtures, Watson rejoined the club.

Watson has also been involved in politics. Although he voted for George McGovern in his first presidential election, Watson later became a Republican. He has also donated to the National Rifle Association. In addition, Watson was a prominent participant in the unsuccessful legal effort to prevent the annexation of the area in which he lives by Overland Park, Kansas.

After residing for many years in Mission Hills, Kansas, Watson moved to Stilwell, Kansas, with his second wife, two children, and three stepchildren. His house has since been annexed by the city of Overland Park. He designed the National Golf Club of Kansas City golf course.

== Awards and honors ==
- Watson has been named PGA Player of the Year six times: in 1977, 1978, 1979, 1980, 1982, and 1984
- Watson won the Vardon Trophy, the PGA Tour's award for lowest scoring average, three straight years: 1977, 1978, and 1979.
- Watson won the PGA Tour money list five times (1977, 1978, 1979, 1980, 1984)
- In 1987, Watson was selected for the Bob Jones Award, the highest honor given by the United States Golf Association (USGA) in recognition of distinguished sportsmanship in golf.
- In 1988, Watson was inducted into the World Golf Hall of Fame
- Watson was inducted into the Stanford Athletics Hall of Fame
- In 1992, Watson won the GCSAA Old Tom Morris Award
- In 2000, Golf Digest ranked Watson as the 10th greatest golfer of all time.
- In 2003, Watson was the Champions Tour money list winner
- In 2003, Watson earned the Payne Stewart Award
- In 2003, Watson earned the Champions Tour's Player of the Year award
- In 2003, Watson was selected for the Byron Nelson Award, bestowed to the golfer with the season's lowest scoring average on the Champions Tour
- In 2003 and 2005, Watson was the Champion Tour's Charles Schwab Cup winner

== Amateur wins ==
- 1967 Missouri State Amateur
- 1968 Missouri State Amateur
- 1970 Missouri State Amateur
- 1971 Missouri State Amateur

== Professional wins (70) ==
=== PGA Tour wins (39) ===
Legend
Major championships (8)
Tour Championships (1)
Other PGA Tour (30)

No.	Date	Tournament	Winning score	To par	Margin of victory	Runner(s)-up
1	Jun 30, 1974	Western Open	72-71-75-69=287	+3	2 strokes	(United States) J. C. Snead, (United States) Tom Weiskopf
2	May 12, 1975	Byron Nelson Golf Classic	72-63-69-65=269	−15	2 strokes	(United States) Bob E. Smith
3	Jul 13, 1975	The Open Championship	71-67-69-72=279	−9	Playoff	(Australia) Jack Newton
4	Jan 23, 1977	Bing Crosby National Pro-Am	66-69-67-71=273	−15	1 stroke	(England) Tony Jacklin
5	Jan 30, 1977	Andy Williams-San Diego Open Invitational	66-67-67-69=269	−19	5 strokes	(United States) Larry Nelson, (United States) John Schroeder
6	Apr 10, 1977	Masters Tournament	70-69-70-67=276	−12	2 strokes	(United States) Jack Nicklaus
7	Jun 26, 1977	Western Open (2)	70-69-75-69=283	−5	1 stroke	(United States) Wally Armstrong, (United States) Johnny Miller
8	Jul 9, 1977	The Open Championship (2)	68-70-65-65=268	−12	1 stroke	(United States) Jack Nicklaus
9	Jan 8, 1978	Joe Garagiola-Tucson Open	63-68-73-72=276	−12	3 strokes	(United States) Bobby Wadkins
10	Jan 23, 1978	Bing Crosby National Pro-Am (2)	66-74-71-69=280	−8	Playoff	(United States) Ben Crenshaw
11	May 7, 1978	Byron Nelson Golf Classic (2)	69-67-70-66=272	−8	1 stroke	(United States) Lee Trevino
12	Aug 27, 1978	Colgate Hall of Fame Classic	72-67-67-71=277	−7	1 stroke	(United States) Hale Irwin, (United States) Tom Kite, (United States) Howard Twitty
13	Sep 24, 1978	Anheuser-Busch Golf Classic	68-69-66-67=270	−18	3 strokes	(United States) Ed Sneed
14	Apr 1, 1979	Sea Pines Heritage Classic	65-65-69-71=270	−14	5 strokes	(United States) Ed Sneed
15	Apr 22, 1979	MONY Tournament of Champions	69-66-70-70=275	−13	6 strokes	(United States) Bruce Lietzke, (United States) Jerry Pate
16	May 13, 1979	Byron Nelson Golf Classic (3)	64-72-69-70=275	−5	Playoff	(United States) Bill Rogers
17	May 27, 1979	Memorial Tournament	73-69-72-71=285	−3	3 strokes	(United States) Miller Barber
18	Aug 26, 1979	Colgate Hall of Fame Classic (2)	70-68-65-69=272	−12	Playoff	(United States) Johnny Miller
19	Jan 27, 1980	Andy Williams-San Diego Open Invitational (2)	68-69-68-70=275	−13	Playoff	(United States) D. A. Weibring
20	Feb 24, 1980	Glen Campbell-Los Angeles Open	69-66-70-71=276	−8	1 stroke	(United States) Bob Gilder, (United States) Don January
21	Apr 20, 1980	MONY Tournament of Champions (2)	65-66-72-73=276	−12	3 strokes	(United States) Jim Colbert
22	Apr 27, 1980	Greater New Orleans Open	66-68-66-73=273	−15	2 strokes	(United States) Lee Trevino
23	May 11, 1980	Byron Nelson Golf Classic (4)	64-70-69-71=274	−6	1 stroke	(United States) Bill Rogers
24	Jul 20, 1980	The Open Championship (3)	68-70-64-69=271	−13	4 strokes	(United States) Lee Trevino
25	Aug 24, 1980	World Series of Golf	65-75-65-65=270	−10	2 strokes	(United States) Raymond Floyd
26	Apr 12, 1981	Masters Tournament (2)	71-68-70-71=280	−8	2 strokes	(United States) Johnny Miller, (United States) Jack Nicklaus
27	Apr 26, 1981	USF&G New Orleans Open (2)	69-69-64-68=270	−18	2 strokes	(United States) Bruce Fleisher
28	Jun 7, 1981	Atlanta Classic	68-70-68-71=277	−11	Playoff	(United States) Tommy Valentine
29	Feb 21, 1982	Glen Campbell-Los Angeles Open (2)	69-67-68-67=271	−13	Playoff	(United States) Johnny Miller
30	Mar 28, 1982	Sea Pines Heritage (2)	69-68-72-71=280	−4	Playoff	(United States) Frank Conner
31	Jun 20, 1982	U.S. Open	72-72-68-70=282	−6	2 strokes	(United States) Jack Nicklaus
32	Jul 18, 1982	The Open Championship (4)	69-71-74-70=284	−4	1 stroke	(England) Peter Oosterhuis, (Zimbabwe) Nick Price
33	Jul 17, 1983	The Open Championship (5)	67-68-70-70=275	−9	1 stroke	(United States) Andy Bean, (United States) Hale Irwin
34	Jan 8, 1984	Seiko-Tucson Match Play Championship	2 and 1			(United States) Gil Morgan
35	May 6, 1984	MONY Tournament of Champions (3)	69-71-67-67=274	−14	5 strokes	(United States) Bruce Lietzke
36	Jul 8, 1984	Western Open (3)	71-69-70-70=280	−8	Playoff	(Australia) Greg Norman
37	Nov 1, 1987	Nabisco Championship	65-66-69-68=268	−12	2 strokes	(United States) Chip Beck
38	Jun 2, 1996	Memorial Tournament (2)	70-68-66-70=274	−14	2 strokes	(United States) David Duval
39	May 24, 1998	MasterCard Colonial	68-66-65-66=265	−15	2 strokes	(United States) Jim Furyk

PGA Tour playoff record (9–5)

No.	Year	Tournament	Opponent(s)	Result
1	1975	The Open Championship	(Australia) Jack Newton	Won 18-hole playoff; Watson: −1 (71), Newton: E (72)
2	1978	Bing Crosby National Pro-Am	(United States) Ben Crenshaw	Won with par on second extra hole
3	1978	PGA Championship	(United States) John Mahaffey, (United States) Jerry Pate	Mahaffey won with birdie on second extra hole
4	1979	Masters Tournament	(United States) Ed Sneed, (United States) Fuzzy Zoeller	Zoeller won with birdie on second extra hole
5	1979	Byron Nelson Golf Classic	(United States) Bill Rogers	Won with birdie on first extra hole
6	1979	Colgate Hall of Fame Classic	(United States) Johnny Miller	Won with par on second extra hole
7	1980	Andy Williams-San Diego Open Invitational	(United States) D. A. Weibring	Won with par on first extra hole
8	1981	Byron Nelson Golf Classic	(United States) Bruce Lietzke	Lost to par on first extra hole
9	1981	Atlanta Classic	(United States) Tommy Valentine	Won with par on third extra hole
10	1982	Glen Campbell-Los Angeles Open	(United States) Johnny Miller	Won with birdie on third extra hole
11	1982	Sea Pines Heritage Classic	(United States) Frank Conner	Won with par on third extra hole
12	1984	Western Open	(Australia) Greg Norman	Won with birdie on third extra hole
13	1988	NEC World Series of Golf	(United States) Mike Reid	Lost to par on first extra hole
14	2009	The Open Championship	(United States) Stewart Cink	Lost four-hole aggregate playoff; Cink: −2 (4-3-4-3=14), Watson: +4 (5-3-7-5=20)

=== European Tour wins (8) ===
Legend
Major championships (8)
Other European Tour (0)

No.	Date	Tournament	Winning score	To par	Margin of victory	Runner(s)-up
1	Jul 13, 1975	The Open Championship	71-67-69-72=279	−9	Playoff	(Australia) Jack Newton
2	Apr 10, 1977	Masters Tournament	70-69-70-67=276	−12	2 strokes	(United States) Jack Nicklaus
3	Jul 9, 1977	The Open Championship (2)	68-70-65-65=268	−12	1 stroke	(United States) Jack Nicklaus
4	Jul 20, 1980	The Open Championship (3)	68-70-64-69=271	−13	4 strokes	(United States) Lee Trevino
5	Apr 12, 1981	Masters Tournament (2)	71-68-70-71=280	−8	2 strokes	(United States) Johnny Miller, (United States) Jack Nicklaus
6	Jun 20, 1982	U.S. Open	72-72-68-70=282	−6	2 strokes	(United States) Jack Nicklaus
7	Jul 18, 1982	The Open Championship (4)	69-71-74-70=284	−4	1 stroke	(England) Peter Oosterhuis, (Zimbabwe) Nick Price
8	Jul 17, 1983	The Open Championship (5)	67-68-70-70=275	−9	1 stroke	(United States) Andy Bean, (United States) Hale Irwin

European Tour playoff record (1–3)

No.	Year	Tournament	Opponent(s)	Result
1	1975	The Open Championship	(Australia) Jack Newton	Won 18-hole playoff; Watson: −1 (71), Newton: E (72)
2	1978	PGA Championship	(United States) Jerry Pate, (United States) John Mahaffey	Mahaffey won with birdie on second extra hole
3	1979	Masters Tournament	(United States) Ed Sneed, (United States) Fuzzy Zoeller	Zoeller won with birdie on second extra hole
4	2009	The Open Championship	(United States) Stewart Cink	Lost four-hole aggregate playoff; Cink: −2 (4-3-4-3=14), Watson: +4 (5-3-7-5=20)

=== PGA of Japan Tour wins (4) ===
No.	Date	Tournament	Winning score	To par	Margin of victory	Runner(s)-up
1	Dec 5, 1976	ABC Japan vs USA Golf Matches	71-66-67-73=277	−11	3 strokes	(Japan) Isao Aoki
2	Nov 23, 1980	Dunlop Phoenix Tournament	68-74-73-67=282	−6	2 strokes	(United States) Mike Reid
3	Nov 4, 1984	Uchida Yoko Cup Japan vs USA Match (2)	67-68=135	−7	1 stroke	(United States) Mark O'Meara, (Japan) Naomichi Ozaki
4	Nov 23, 1997	Dunlop Phoenix Tournament (2)	70-65-70-70=275	−9	2 strokes	(Japan) Naomichi Ozaki

PGA of Japan Tour playoff record (0–1)

No.	Year	Tournament	Opponent	Result
1	1983	Dunlop Phoenix Tournament	(Taiwan) Chen Tze-ming	Lost to par on first extra hole

=== Asia Golf Circuit wins (1) ===
No.	Date	Tournament	Winning score	To par	Margin of victory	Runner-up
1	Mar 8, 1992	Hutchison Telecom Hong Kong Open	65-66-69-74=274	−10	3 strokes	(Northern Ireland) Ronan Rafferty

=== PGA Tour of Australia wins (1) ===
No.	Date	Tournament	Winning score	To par	Margin of victory	Runner-up
1	Nov 18, 1984	National Panasonic Australian Open	67-72-70-72=281	−7	1 stroke	(Australia) Bob Stanton

=== Other wins (2) ===
No.	Date	Tournament	Winning score	To par	Margin of victory	Runner-up
1	Sep 7, 1975	World Series of Golf	69-71=140	−4	2 strokes	(United States) Jack Nicklaus
2	Nov 27, 1994	Skins Game	$210,000		$40,000	(United States) Fred Couples

=== Champions Tour wins (14) ===
Legend
Champions Tour major championships (6)
Tour Championships (3)
Other Champions Tour (5)

No.	Date	Tournament	Winning score	To par	Margin of victory	Runner(s)-up
1	Sep 19, 1999	Bank One Championship	67-67-62=196	−20	5 strokes	(United States) Bruce Summerhays
2	Nov 5, 2000	IR Senior Tour Championship	70-67-67-66=270	−18	1 stroke	(United States) John Jacobs
3	May 27, 2001	Senior PGA Championship	72-69-66-67=274	−14	1 stroke	(United States) Jim Thorpe
4	Oct 22, 2002	Senior Tour Championship (2)	74-67-66-67=274	−14	1 stroke	(United States) Gil Morgan
5	Jul 27, 2003	Senior British Open	66-67-66-64=263	−17	Playoff	(England) Carl Mason
6	Aug 31, 2003	JELD-WEN Tradition	68-62-73-70=273	−15	1 stroke	(United States) Jim Ahern, (United States) Tom Kite
7	Jul 24, 2005	The Senior British Open Championship (2)	75-71-64-70=280	−4	Playoff	(Republic of Ireland) Des Smyth
8	Oct 30, 2005	Charles Schwab Cup Championship (3)	69-70-69-64=272	−16	1 stroke	(United States) Jay Haas
9	Feb 18, 2007	Outback Steakhouse Pro-Am	70-69-70=209	−4	1 stroke	(United States) Andy Bean, (United States) Jay Haas
10	Jul 29, 2007	The Senior Open Championship (3)	70-71-70-73=284	E	1 stroke	(Australia) Stewart Ginn, (United States) Mark O'Meara
11	Apr 20, 2008	Outback Steakhouse Pro-Am (2)	63-71-70=204	−9	1 stroke	(United States) Jay Haas, (United States) Scott Hoch
12	Apr 27, 2008	Liberty Mutual Legends of Golf (with (United States) Andy North)	59-62-64=185	−31	1 stroke	(United States) Jeff Sluman and (United States) Craig Stadler
13	Jan 24, 2010	Mitsubishi Electric Championship at Hualalai	63-66-65=194	−22	1 stroke	(United States) Fred Couples
14	May 29, 2011	Senior PGA Championship (2)	70-70-68-70=278	−10	Playoff	(United States) David Eger

Champions Tour playoff record (3–8)

No.	Year	Tournament	Opponent(s)	Result
1	2000	Boone Valley Classic	(Spain) José María Cañizares, (United States) Walter Hall, (United States) Lanny Wadkins	Wadkins won with par on third extra hole Hall and Watson eliminated by par on first hole
2	2000	The Countrywide Tradition	(United States) Tom Kite, (United States) Larry Nelson	Kite won with birdie on sixth extra hole Nelson eliminated by par on second hole
3	2002	SBC Senior Classic	(United States) Tom Kite	Lost to par on second extra hole
4	2002	U.S. Senior Open	(United States) Don Pooley	Lost to birdie on fifth extra hole after three-hole aggregate playoff; Pooley: E (4-4-4=12), Watson: E (4-4-4=12)
5	2003	Kinko's Classic of Austin	(United States) Hale Irwin	Lost to birdie on second extra hole
6	2003	Senior British Open	(England) Carl Mason	Won with par on second extra hole
7	2004	ACE Group Classic	(United States) Gary Koch, (United States) Craig Stadler	Stadler won with birdie on first extra hole
8	2005	MasterCard Championship	(United States) Dana Quigley	Lost to par on third extra hole
9	2005	Bayer Advantage Classic	(United States) Gil Morgan, (United States) Dana Quigley	Quigley won with birdie on first extra hole
10	2005	The Senior British Open Championship	(Republic of Ireland) Des Smyth	Won with par on third extra hole
11	2011	Senior PGA Championship	(United States) David Eger	Won with birdie on first extra hole

=== Other senior wins (9) ===
- 1999 Diners Club Matches (with Jack Nicklaus)
- 2000 Hyundai Team Matches (with Jack Nicklaus)
- 2004 Wendy's Champions Skins Game
- 2005 Liberty Mutual Legends of Golf – Raphael Division (with Andy North)
- 2006 Liberty Mutual Legends of Golf – Raphael Division (with Andy North)
- 2007 Wendy's Champions Skins Game (with Jack Nicklaus), Liberty Mutual Legends of Golf – Raphael Division (with Andy North)
- 2010 Wendy's Champions Skins Game (with Jack Nicklaus)
- 2011 Wendy's Champions Skins Game (with Jack Nicklaus)

== Major championships ==
=== Wins (8) ===
Year	Championship	54 holes	Winning score	Margin	Runner(s)-up
1975	The Open Championship	3 shot deficit	−9 (71-67-69-72=279)	Playoff^{1}	(Australia) Jack Newton
1977	Masters Tournament	Tied for lead	−12 (70-69-70-67=276)	2 strokes	(United States) Jack Nicklaus
1977	The Open Championship (2)	Tied for lead	−12 (68-70-65-65=268)	1 stroke	(United States) Jack Nicklaus
1980	The Open Championship (3)	4 shot lead	−13 (68-70-64-69=271)	4 strokes	(United States) Lee Trevino
1981	Masters Tournament (2)	1 shot lead	−8 (71-68-70-71=280)	2 strokes	(United States) Johnny Miller, (United States) Jack Nicklaus
1982	U.S. Open	Tied for lead	−6 (72-72-68-70=282)	2 strokes	(United States) Jack Nicklaus
1982	The Open Championship (4)	3 shot deficit	−4 (69-71-74-70=284)	1 stroke	(England) Peter Oosterhuis, (Zimbabwe) Nick Price
1983	The Open Championship (5)	1 shot lead	−9 (67-68-70-70=275)	1 stroke	(United States) Andy Bean, (United States) Hale Irwin

^{1}Defeated Newton in 18-hole playoff; Watson (71), Newton (72)

=== Results timeline ===
Tournament	1970	1971	1972	1973	1974	1975	1976	1977	1978	1979
Masters Tournament	CUT					T8	T33	1	T2	T2
U.S. Open			T29	CUT	T5	T9	7	T7	T6	CUT
The Open Championship						1	CUT	1	T14	T26
PGA Championship				T12	T11	9	T15	T6	T2	T12

Tournament	1980	1981	1982	1983	1984	1985	1986	1987	1988	1989
Masters Tournament	T12	1	T5	T4	2	T10	T6	T7	T9	T14
U.S. Open	T3	T23	1	2	T11	CUT	T24	2	T36	T46
The Open Championship	1	T23	1	1	T2	T47	T35	7	T28	4
PGA Championship	T10	CUT	T9	T47	T39	T6	T16	T14	T31	T9

Tournament	1990	1991	1992	1993	1994	1995	1996	1997	1998	1999
Masters Tournament	T7	T3	T48	T45	13	T14	CUT	4	CUT	CUT
U.S. Open	CUT	T16	CUT	T5	T6	T56	T13	64	CUT	T57
The Open Championship	CUT	T26	CUT	CUT	T11	T31		T10	CUT	CUT
PGA Championship	T19	CUT	T62	5	T9	T58	T17	CUT	CUT	CUT

Tournament	2000	2001	2002	2003	2004	2005	2006	2007	2008	2009
Masters Tournament	CUT	CUT	T40	CUT	CUT	CUT	CUT	CUT	CUT	CUT
U.S. Open	T27			T28						
The Open Championship	T55	CUT	CUT	T18		T41	T48		CUT	2
PGA Championship	T9	T66	T48	CUT						

Tournament	2010	2011	2012	2013	2014	2015	2016
Masters Tournament	T18	CUT	CUT	CUT	CUT	CUT	CUT
U.S. Open	T29						
The Open Championship	CUT	T22	T77	CUT	T51	CUT	
PGA Championship				CUT	CUT		

Win
Top 10
Did not play

CUT = missed the halfway cut (3rd round cut in 1976 Open Championship)
"T" indicates a tie for a place.

=== Summary ===
Tournament	Wins	2nd	3rd	Top-5	Top-10	Top-25	Events	Cuts made
Masters Tournament	2	3	1	9	15	20	43	24
U.S. Open	1	2	1	6	11	16	31	25
The Open Championship	5	2	0	8	10	15	38	26
PGA Championship	0	1	0	2	10	18	33	25
Totals	8	8	2	25	46	69	145	100

- Most consecutive cuts made – 19 (1985 Open Championship – 1990 Masters)
- Longest streak of top-10s – 7 (1982 Masters – 1983 Open Championship)

== Results in The Players Championship ==
Tournament	1974	1975	1976	1977	1978	1979	1980	1981	1982	1983	1984	1985	1986	1987	1988	1989
The Players Championship	CUT	T8	T9	T5	CUT	2	T3	CUT	T6	T19	T8	T55	T58	CUT	CUT	T11

Tournament	1990	1991	1992	1993	1994	1995	1996	1997	1998	1999
The Players Championship	T36	T20	T2	10	T14	T29	T33	T53	T35	T62

Top 10

CUT = missed the halfway cut
"T" indicates a tie for a place

== Results in World Golf Championships ==
Tournament	1999
Match Play	R64
Championship	
Invitational	

Did not play

QF, R16, R32, R64 = Round in which player lost in match play

== Senior major championships ==
=== Wins (6) ===
Year	Championship	54 holes	Winning score	Margin	Runner(s)-up
2001	Senior PGA Championship	Tied for lead	−14 (72-69-66-67=274)	1 stroke	(United States) Jim Thorpe
2003	The Senior Open Championship	3 shot deficit	−17 (66-67-66-64=263)	Playoff^{1}	(England) Carl Mason
2003	JELD-WEN Tradition	1 shot deficit	−15 (68-62-73-70=273)	1 stroke	(United States) Jim Ahern, (United States) Tom Kite, (United States) Gil Morgan
2005	The Senior Open Championship (2)	1 shot lead	−4 (75-71-64-70=280)	Playoff^{2}	(Republic of Ireland) Des Smyth
2007	The Senior Open Championship (3)	1 shot deficit	E (70-71-70-73=284)	1 stroke	(Australia) Stewart Ginn, (United States) Mark O'Meara
2011	Senior PGA Championship (2)	1 shot deficit	−10 (70-70-68-70=278)	Playoff^{3}	(United States) David Eger

^{1}Defeated Mason in a playoff with par at the second extra hole.
^{2}Defeated Smyth in a playoff with par at the third extra hole.
^{3}Defeated Eger in a playoff with birdie at the first extra hole.

=== Results timeline ===
Results not in chronological order before 2017.

Tournament	2000	2001	2002	2003	2004	2005	2006	2007	2008	2009
The Tradition	2		5	1	T55	T9	T14	T6	T3	T5
Senior PGA Championship	T17	1	T18	T17	T4	T27	T23	T52	T16	4
U.S. Senior Open	T10	T16	2	2	T25	T5	2	4	T23	T43
Senior Players Championship	T18	T8		T2		T3	T17	2		2
The Senior Open Championship				1	T22	1	T23	1	T5	T8

Tournament	2010	2011	2012	2013	2014	2015	2016	2017	2018	2019
The Tradition	T15	T32			T6	T13				
Senior PGA Championship	T18	1		T28	2			CUT		
U.S. Senior Open	5		T22	T23		T7	T54	T40		T17
Senior Players Championship	66	T28	T20	T27			T25			
The Senior Open Championship	T24	T3	T10	T36	T10	T15	T27	T23	T21	T64

Note: The Senior British Open was not a Champions Tour major until 2003.

Win
Top 10
Did not play

CUT = missed the halfway cut
"T" indicates a tie for a place

== Team appearances ==
Professional

- Ryder Cup (representing the United States): 1977 (winners), 1981 (winners), 1983 (winners), 1989 (tie), 1993 (non-playing captain, winners), 2014 (non-playing captain)
- Wendy's 3-Tour Challenge (representing Senior PGA Tour): 1999 (winners), 2000, 2001

== Golf courses designed ==
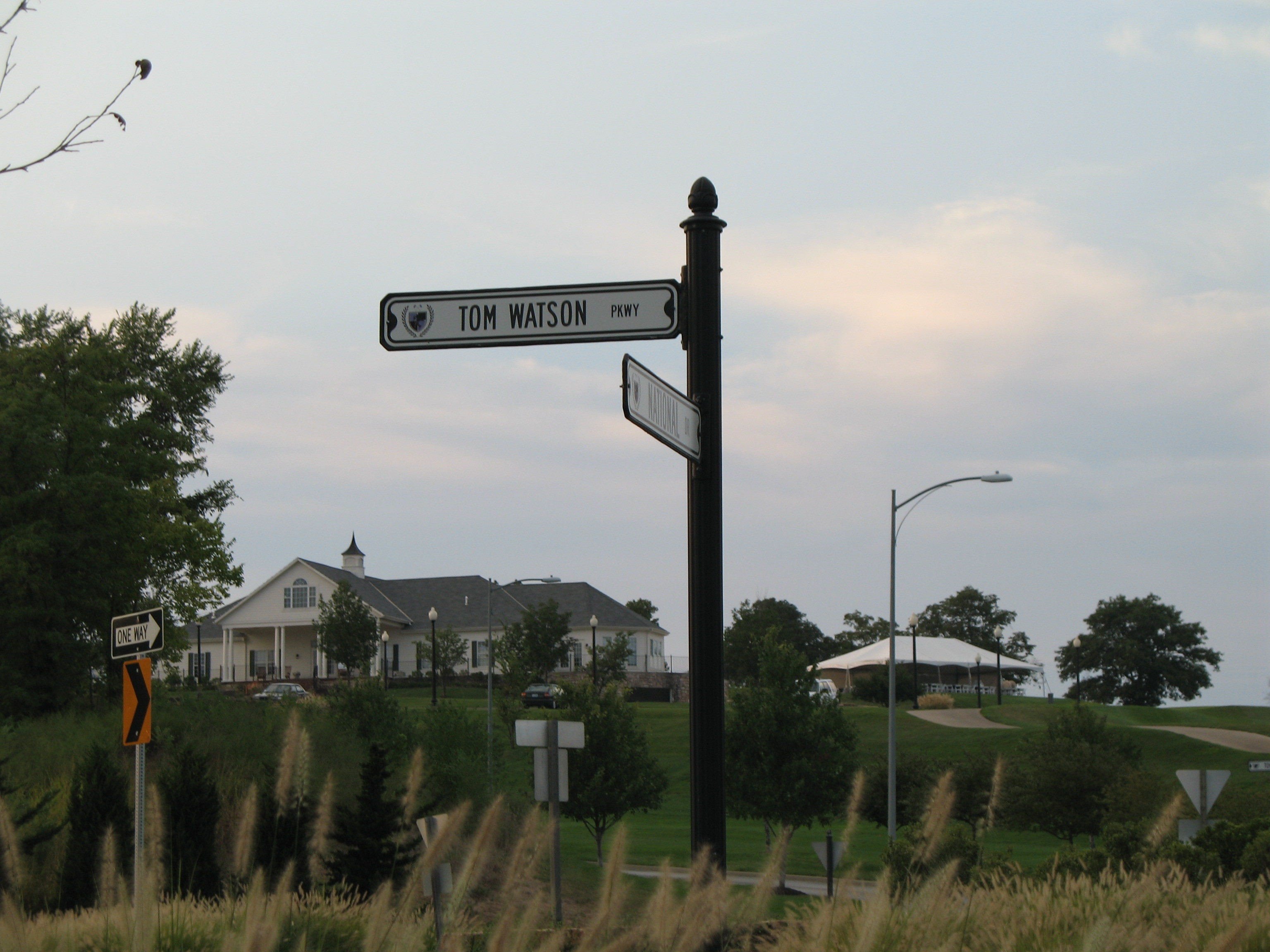
Tom Watson Parkway at the National Golf Club in Parkville

Watson is a member of the American Society of Golf Course Architects and has designed golf courses through his Tom Watson Design company in Johnson County, Kansas.

- Ballybunion Golf Club – County Kerry, Ireland (1995 redesign)
- Cassique Golf Course, Kiawah Island, South Carolina
- National Golf Club of Kansas City, Parkville, Missouri (Route 45 which passes the course is called the "Tom Watson Parkway")
- Independence Course at Reunion Resort & Club, Orlando, Florida
- Phoenix Resort, Miyazaki, Japan
- The Links at Spanish Bay, Pebble Beach, California (with Sandy Tatum and Robert Trent Jones, Jr.)
- Shadow Glen the Golf Club, Olathe, Kansas (with Jay Morrish and Tom Weiskopf)
- Loch Lloyd Country Club, Village of Loch Lloyd, Missouri (Renovation)
- The Conservatory, Hammock Beach resorts, Palm Coast, Florida
- Mozingo Lake Golf Course (Junior 9 course), Maryville, Missouri
- The Manor Golf & Country Club, Milton, Georgia

== Bibliography ==
- Getting Up and Down (with Nick Seitz) (1983)
- Tom Watson's Getting Back to Basics (with Nick Seitz) (1993)
- Tom Watson's Strategic Golf (1995)
- The Timeless Swing (with Nick Seitz) (2011)

=== USGA Series ===
- The Rules of Golf (with Frank Hannigan) (1980)
- The New Rules of Golf (with Frank Hannigan) (1984)
- The Rules of Golf (with Frank Hannigan) (1988)
- The Rules of Golf (with Frank Hannigan) (1999)

== See also ==
- 1971 PGA Tour Qualifying School graduates
- List of golfers with most PGA Tour wins
- List of men's major championships winning golfers
- List of golfers with most Champions Tour wins
- List of golfers with most Champions Tour major championship wins
- List of golfers with most wins in one PGA Tour event
- Bay Area Sports Hall of Fame
