= David Gossett =

American professional golfer (born 1979)

Personal information
- Full name: David Spencer Gossett
- Nationality: United States
- Born: April 28, 1979 (age 47) Phoenix, Arizona, U.S.
- Height: 5 ft 10 in (1.78 m)
- Weight: 175 lb (79 kg; 12.5 st)

Career
- Sport: Golf
- College: University of Texas
- Turned professional: 2000
- Former tours: PGA Tour; Web.com Tour
- Professional wins: 1
- Highest ranking: 99 (January 6, 2002)

Number of wins by tour
- PGA Tour: 1

Best results in major championships
- Masters Tournament: T54: 2000
- PGA Championship: CUT: 2001, 2002
- U.S. Open: CUT: 2000, 2014
- The Open Championship: CUT: 2000

David Spencer Gossett (born April 28, 1979) is an American professional golfer and real estate agent. He played on the PGA Tour winning one tournament.

== Early life ==
In 1979, Gossett was born in Phoenix, Arizona. His father introduced him to the game of golf and he competed in his first tournament at age 10. He went to Germantown High School in Germantown, Tennessee. He was part of the IMG golf academy in Bradenton Florida (it was then called, David Leadbetter Golf Academy).

== Amateur career ==
Gossett attended the University of Texas and was a two-time first-team All-American member of the golf team. In 1999, he won the U.S. Amateur, the Big 12 Championship, and was the Big 12 Student-Athlete of the Year in 1999. He was also a member of the Walker Cup team in 1999.

== Professional career ==
In 2000, Gossett turned professional. As winner of the U.S. Amateur, Gossett was supposed to play in 2000 U.S. Open in the same group as defending champion Payne Stewart but Stewart perished in a plane crash in October 1999.

Gossett won his first official PGA Tour event in 2001 at the John Deere Classic. However, he didn't stay at champion level. Gossett lost his fully exempt status in 2004 and had to split his playing time between the PGA Tour and the Nationwide Tour afterwards.

In the early 2010s, Gossett spent the early part of the decade trying to get back on the PGA Tour through the Web.com Tour and the Adams Pro Tour. Gossett qualified for the 2014 U.S Open, his first since 2000. Gossett also played in the John Deere Classic and the Barracuda Championship, but missed the cut in both.

Gossett is currently a commercial real estate agent in Nashville, Tennessee.

== Awards and honors ==
In 1999, while at the University of Texas at Austin, Gossett earned Big 12 Student-Athlete of the Year honors.

== Amateur wins ==
- 1997 Rolex Tournament of Champions
- 1998 Red River Classic, Tucker Invitational, Golf Digest Collegiate Invitational
- 1999 U.S. Amateur, Big 12 Championship

== Professional wins (1) ==
=== PGA Tour wins (1) ===
| No. | Date | Tournament | Winning score | Margin of victory | Runner-up |
|---|---|---|---|---|---|
| 1 | Jul 29, 2001 | John Deere Classic | −19 (68-64-68-65=265) | 1 stroke | (United States) Briny Baird |

== Results in major championships ==
| Tournament | 2000 | 2001 | 2002 | 2003 | 2004 | 2005 | 2006 | 2007 | 2008 | 2009 | 2010 | 2011 | 2012 | 2013 | 2014 |
|---|---|---|---|---|---|---|---|---|---|---|---|---|---|---|---|
| Masters Tournament | T54LA | | | | | | | | | | | | | | |
| U.S. Open | CUT | | | | | | | | | | | | | | CUT |
| The Open Championship | CUT | | | | | | | | | | | | | | |
| PGA Championship | | CUT | CUT | | | | | | | | | | | | |

Did not play

LA = Low Amateur
CUT = missed the half-way cut
"T" indicates a tie for a place

== U.S. national team appearances ==
Amateur

- Junior Ryder Cup: 1997
- Walker Cup: 1999
