= 2000 U.S. Open (golf) =

Coordinates: 36.568°N 121.950°W

Tournament information
- Dates: June 15–18, 2000
- Location: Pebble Beach, California
- Course: Pebble Beach Golf Links
- Organized by: USGA
- Tour(s): PGA Tour; European Tour; Japan Golf Tour

Statistics
- Par: 71
- Length: 6,846 yards (6,260 m)
- Field: 156 players, 63 after cut
- Cut: 149 (+7)
- Prize fund: $4,500,000 €4,723,908
- Winner's share: $800,000 €839,806

Champion
- (United States) Tiger Woods
- 272 (−12)

Location in the United States

The 2000 United States Open Championship was the 100th U.S. Open Championship, held June 15–18 at Pebble Beach Golf Links in Pebble Beach, California. Tiger Woods won his first U.S. Open by a record-setting fifteen strokes over runners-up Ernie Els and Miguel Ángel Jiménez – it remains the most dominating performance and victory in any major championship. As the United States Golf Association wanted to begin the millennium with a memorable tournament, Pebble Beach was moved up two years in the rotation. Notable golfers going into the tournament at large included Jack Nicklaus, playing in his final U.S. Open; Vijay Singh, the year's Masters winner; Ernie Els; and David Duval.

Reigning champion Payne Stewart had died in an aviation accident on October 25 the previous year at the age of 42. His death was commemorated many times throughout the week, starting with a ceremony on the eve of the tournament at the 18th hole. Speakers included Stewart's widow Tracey and his good friend Paul Azinger, while attendees included Phil Mickelson, Davis Love III, David Duval, Tom Lehman, Lee Janzen, Sergio García and Stewart's caddy Mike Hicks, and it concluded with shots being hit into Stillwater Cove in a golf version of a 21-gun salute. García also wore Stewart's trademark navy plus fours in Stewart's honor in the first round. Nicklaus was asked to take Stewart's spot in the traditional opening grouping of the prior year's Open Championship (British Open) winner (Paul Lawrie), U.S. Amateur winner (David Gossett), and U.S. Open winner, and he asked for a moment of silence in Stewart's memory before his opening tee shot.

Aside from being the last U.S. Open appearance for Nicklaus, playing in his 44th consecutive U.S. Open, it was also the last appearance for two-time winner Curtis Strange.

== Course layout ==
| Hole | 1 | 2 | 3 | 4 | 5 | 6 | 7 | 8 | 9 | Out | 10 | 11 | 12 | 13 | 14 | 15 | 16 | 17 | 18 | In | Total |
|---|---|---|---|---|---|---|---|---|---|---|---|---|---|---|---|---|---|---|---|---|---|
| Yards | 381 | 484 | 390 | 331 | 188 | 524 | 106 | 418 | 466 | 3,288 | 446 | 380 | 202 | 406 | 573 | 397 | 403 | 208 | 543 | 3,558 | 6,846 |
| Par | 4 | 4 | 4 | 4 | 3 | 5 | 3 | 4 | 4 | 35 | 4 | 4 | 3 | 4 | 5 | 4 | 4 | 3 | 5 | 36 | 71 |

Previous course lengths for major championships

- 6,809 yards (6,226 m) – par 72, 1992 U.S. Open
- 6,825 yards (6,241 m) – par 72, 1982 U.S. Open
- 6,806 yards (6,223 m) – par 72, 1977 PGA Championship
- 6,812 yards (6,229 m) – par 72, 1972 U.S. Open

The 2nd hole was previously played as a par-5.

== Round summaries ==
=== First round ===
Thursday, June 15, 2000
Friday, June 16, 2000

Players who started early took advantage of the calm conditions before dense fog came in. The second hole proved difficult for many golfers. USGA officials changed the hole from a par-5 to a par-4. Tiger Woods, with an early starting time, fired a six-under 65 to take the first round lead. 75 golfers were unable to complete their rounds due to fog and finished Friday morning. Local favorite and CBS commentator Bobby Clampett, playing in his first event in 21 months, shot 68 to tie for fourth with Hale Irwin and Loren Roberts, three shots behind Woods. Players' Championship winner Hal Sutton tied for seventh after chipping in on the 1st hole for the first opening hole eagle in U.S. Open history.

| Place | Player | Score | To par |
|---|---|---|---|
| 1 | (United States) Tiger Woods | 65 | −6 |
| 2 | (Spain) Miguel Ángel Jiménez | 66 | −5 |
| 3 | (United States) John Huston | 67 | −4 |
| T4 | (United States) Bobby Clampett | 68 | −3 |
| T4 | (United States) Hale Irwin | 68 | −3 |
| T4 | (United States) Loren Roberts | 68 | −3 |
| T7 | (Argentina) Ángel Cabrera | 69 | −2 |
| T7 | (England) Nick Faldo | 69 | −2 |
| T7 | (United States) Rocco Mediate | 69 | −2 |
| T7 | (United States) Hal Sutton | 69 | −2 |

=== Second round ===
Friday, June 16, 2000
Saturday, June 17, 2000

Weather conditions made the course extremely difficult for scoring. Tiger Woods, however, seemed almost impervious to the conditions and continued to make birdies to stretch his lead. On the 6th hole, Woods fired a now famous approach to reach the par-5 in two shots, ripping an iron from deep rough over the ocean and a cypress tree and winding up within 15 feet from the hole. He would two-putt for birdie, would also birdie the 7th and 11th holes. With darkness settling in, Woods and his playing partners decided to attempt to play the 12th hole, a par 3, before halting play. Woods made the most of it, sinking a 30-foot putt for birdie and finishing his day with a large fist pump.

After returning on Saturday, Woods hooked his tee shot on the 18th hole into the Pacific, which left him with only one ball left, but drove straight at the second attempt and bogeyed the hole to finish with two-under par 69. With the scoring average so difficult, he still increased his lead to six shots. Playing his last U.S. Open hole, Nicklaus memorably reached the 18th green in two shots but ultimately three-putted for par. Lee Westwood finished the round tied for sixth after making an 80-foot eagle putt on the 18th hole for the first eagle on that hole during a U.S. Open.

| Place | Player | Score | To par |
|---|---|---|---|
| 1 | (United States) Tiger Woods | 65-69=134 | −8 |
| T2 | (Denmark) Thomas Bjørn | 70-70=140 | −2 |
| T2 | (Spain) Miguel Ángel Jiménez | 66-74=140 | −2 |
| T4 | (Spain) José María Olazábal | 70-71=141 | −1 |
| T4 | (United States) Kirk Triplett | 70-71=141 | −1 |
| T6 | (United States) John Huston | 67-75=142 | E |
| T6 | (United States) Hal Sutton | 69-73=142 | E |
| T6 | (England) Lee Westwood | 71-71=142 | E |
| T9 | (England) Nick Faldo | 69-74=143 | +1 |
| T9 | (Fiji) Vijay Singh | 70-73=143 | +1 |

Amateurs: Wilson (+4), Baddeley (+11), Barnes (+11), Gossett (+13), Lile (+14), McLuen (+16).

=== Third round ===
Saturday, June 17, 2000

The 36-hole cut was 149 (+7), and only 63 players advanced to the third round. The low number was attributed to the fact that the cut is the top 60 players and ties, plus anyone within 10 strokes of the leader. Only 17 players were within 10 strokes of Woods. Conditions on Saturday were brutal for scoring, with the wind blowing hard and the rough difficult to manage. Woods, after finishing his 2nd round 69, made a triple bogey on the third hole but multiple birdies eventually put him back at even par for the round. Woods drained a 15-foot putt on the 9th hole, the most difficult on the course, and finished at even par for the day with a 71. His ten stroke lead was the largest 54-hole lead of a U.S. Open.

Ernie Els shot the low round of the day with a 68, the only round under par all day, to put him into second place.

| Place | Player | Score | To par |
|---|---|---|---|
| 1 | (United States) Tiger Woods | 65-69-71=205 | −8 |
| 2 | (South Africa) Ernie Els | 74-73-68=215 | +2 |
| T3 | (Republic of Ireland) Pádraig Harrington | 73-71-72=216 | +3 |
| T3 | (Spain) Miguel Ángel Jiménez | 66-74-76=216 | +3 |
| T5 | (United States) Phil Mickelson | 71-73-73=217 | +4 |
| T5 | (Spain) José María Olazábal | 70-71-76=217 | +4 |
| T7 | (United States) John Huston | 67-75-76=218 | +5 |
| T7 | (England) Lee Westwood | 71-71-76=218 | +5 |
| T9 | (New Zealand) Michael Campbell | 71-77-71=219 | +6 |
| T9 | (England) Nick Faldo | 69-74-76=219 | +6 |
| T9 | (United States) Loren Roberts | 68-78-73=219 | +6 |

=== Final round ===
Sunday, June 18, 2000

Tiger Woods won his third major championship in amazing fashion after a final round 67. Woods began his day by making nine consecutive pars, but he only missed one fairway and one green on his way to an outward 35. He would end his par streak with a birdie at the 10th, while his competitors faltered on the brutal poa annua greens. Woods then made three consecutive birdies at 12, 13 and 14 to move to 12-under par. After a par at 15, Woods then got up and down at both 16 and 17 for pars. He would par the final hole to finish off a bogey-free 67. At twelve strokes under par, he was the only player to finish at even par or better and became the first player in the 106-year history of the U.S. Open to finish at double-digits under par. Only one other player had even reached double-digits under par in a U.S. Open – Gil Morgan in 1992, the last time the tournament had been held at Pebble Beach. Woods' aggregate 272 tied what was then the lowest score in a U.S. Open set by Nicklaus, Lee Janzen and Jim Furyk, all achieved on par-70 courses. His 15-stroke margin of victory also surpassed the 13-shot record margin set by Old Tom Morris at the 1862 Open Championship at Prestwick and remains the largest in a major championship.

| Place | Player | Score | To par | Money ($) |
|---|---|---|---|---|
| 1 | (United States) Tiger Woods | 65-69-71-67=272 | −12 | 800,000 |
| T2 | (Spain) Miguel Ángel Jiménez | 66-74-76-71=287 | +3 | 391,150 |
| T2 | (South Africa) Ernie Els | 74-73-68-72=287 | +3 | 391,150 |
| 4 | (United States) John Huston | 67-75-76-70=288 | +4 | 212,779 |
| T5 | (England) Lee Westwood | 71-71-76-71=289 | +5 | 162,526 |
| T5 | (Republic of Ireland) Pádraig Harrington | 73-71-72-73=289 | +5 | 162,526 |
| 7 | (England) Nick Faldo | 69-74-76-71=290 | +6 | 137,203 |
| T8 | (Fiji) Vijay Singh | 70-73-80-68=291 | +7 | 112,766 |
| T8 | (United States) Stewart Cink | 77-72-72-70=291 | +7 | 112,766 |
| T8 | (United States) David Duval | 75-71-74-71=291 | +7 | 112,766 |
| T8 | (United States) Loren Roberts | 68-78-73-72=291 | +7 | 112,766 |

Amateurs: Wilson (+20)

Full final leaderboard

==== Scorecard ====
| Birdie | Bogey | Double bogey |

| Hole | 1 | 2 | 3 | 4 | 5 | 6 | 7 | 8 | 9 | 10 | 11 | 12 | 13 | 14 | 15 | 16 | 17 | 18 |
|---|---|---|---|---|---|---|---|---|---|---|---|---|---|---|---|---|---|---|
| Par | 4 | 4 | 4 | 4 | 3 | 5 | 3 | 4 | 4 | 4 | 4 | 3 | 4 | 5 | 4 | 4 | 3 | 5 |
| (United States) Woods | −8 | −8 | −8 | −8 | −8 | −8 | −8 | −8 | −8 | −9 | −9 | −10 | −11 | −12 | −12 | −12 | −12 | −12 |
| (South Africa) Els | +2 | +2 | +2 | +3 | +4 | +4 | +4 | +4 | +3 | +2 | +2 | +3 | +3 | +3 | +3 | +3 | +3 | +3 |
| (Spain) Jiménez | +2 | +2 | +2 | +2 | +1 | E | E | E | +1 | +1 | +1 | +1 | +1 | +1 | +1 | +1 | +2 | +3 |
| (United States) Huston | +6 | +7 | +6 | +5 | +4 | +4 | +4 | +4 | +4 | +4 | +3 | +4 | +4 | +4 | +4 | +4 | +4 | +4 |
| (Republic of Ireland) Harrington | +2 | +2 | +1 | +1 | +1 | E | +1 | +2 | +1 | +2 | +2 | +3 | +4 | +4 | +4 | +4 | +5 | +5 |
| (England) Westwood | +5 | +5 | +4 | +4 | +4 | +3 | +3 | +4 | +4 | +4 | +3 | +3 | +3 | +4 | +4 | +5 | +5 | +5 |
| (England) Faldo | +6 | +5 | +5 | +4 | +4 | +4 | +4 | +6 | +6 | +6 | +6 | +6 | +5 | +5 | +5 | +6 | +6 | +6 |

Cumulative tournament scores, relative to par

== Impact ==
Tiger Woods would go on to win four majors in a row, the first player since Bobby Jones to simultaneously hold all four major championship titles, otherwise referred to as the "Tiger Slam". The year 2000 is often regarded as the pinnacle of Woods's career.

In a 2011 piece for the ESPN outlet Grantland.com, writer Bill Barnwell argued that Woods' performance at the 2000 U.S. Open was statistically the most dominant by any major championship winner since 1960. When compared to the performance of all golfers who completed four rounds in that event, Woods' score of 272 was 4.12 standard deviations better than the mean of the field he competed against—more than half a standard deviation better than the winner of any other major in that period.

== Quotes ==
- "Before we went out, I knew I had no chance." – Ernie Els, commenting on Tiger Woods's 10-stroke advantage at the beginning of the final round.
- "If you were building the complete golfer, you'd build Tiger Woods." – Mark O'Meara,
- "We've been talking about him for two years, I guess we'll be talking about him for the next 20. When he's on, we don't have much of a chance." – Ernie Els, on Tiger Woods
- "Records are great, but you don't really pay attention to that. The only thing I know is I got the trophy sitting right next to me." – Tiger Woods, on his dominating performance.
