= Bobby Clampett =

American professional golfer (born 1960)

Personal information
- Full name: Robert Daniel Clampett Jr.
- Nationality: United States
- Born: April 22, 1960 (age 66) Monterey, California, U.S.
- Height: 5 ft 10 in (1.78 m)
- Weight: 171 lb (78 kg; 12.2 st)
- Spouse: Marianna Clampett
- Children: 3 (including Katelyn Clampett)

Career
- Sport: Golf
- College: Brigham Young University
- Turned professional: 1980
- Former tours: PGA Tour; Champions Tour
- Professional wins: 3

Number of wins by tour
- PGA Tour: 1
- Japan Golf Tour: 1
- Other: 1

Best results in major championships
- Masters Tournament: T23: 1979
- PGA Championship: T27: 1981
- U.S. Open: T3: 1982
- The Open Championship: T10: 1982

Achievements and awards
- Haskins Award: 1979, 1980

Robert Daniel Clampett Jr. (born April 22, 1960) is an American television golf analyst, golf course architect, writer, and professional golfer, who played on the PGA Tour from 1980 to 1995. Clampett began playing on the Champions Tour in April 2010.

== Early life ==
Clampett was born in Monterey, California. He attended Stevenson School in Pebble Beach, California. He based his early golf training on the book "The Golfing Machine," by Homer Kelley, and he worked closely with golf instructor Ben Doyle, the first authorized instructor of the Golfing Machine.

== Amateur career ==
From 1978 to 1980, he was a three-time All-American and two-time Collegiate Golfer of the Year at Brigham Young University. His important amateur titles included the Porter Cup, the Sunnehanna Amateur, and the Western Amateur. He also won the 1978 World Amateur medal, in team competition for the Eisenhower Trophy and the 1978 and 1980 California State Amateurs. Fred Haskins Award Recipient 1979 and 1980. He was the low amateur at the 1978 U.S. Open and 1979 Masters.

== Professional career ==
Clampett turned professional after the 1980 U.S. Open. From 1980 to 1995, he played on the PGA Tour. He won only one tournament, the 1982 Southern Open. He had almost three dozen top-10 finishes in his career, including nine 2nd or 3rd-place finishes, and had over $1 million in career earnings. His best finish in a major was a T-3 at the 1982 U.S. Open. He was a member of the 1982 World Cup team.

Clampett won an event on the Japan Golf Tour in 1981. He finished 2nd at the 1983 Air New Zealand Shell Open, an official event on the Australasian Tour. He recorded three runner-up finishes in a four year stretch at the Italian Open in the early 1980s. At the 1982 Open Championship played at Royal Troon in Scotland, Clampett opened with rounds of 67 and 66 and held a five shot lead going into Saturday's play. His lead had increased two shots by the fifth hole. Then Clampett drove the ball into a pot bunker at the sixth hole. It took him three shots to get out. This sparked the beginning of a precipitous collapse by Clampett that saw him finish with rounds of 78 and 77 and finish in a tie for 10th.

Like his play at the Open Championship, Clampett's career precipitously declined after the 1982 season. After recording a victory and nine top-3 finishes in his first two seasons as a pro Clampett abruptly changed his swing with devastating results. He would record only two top-3 finishes for the remainder of his career and would never win again.

He did notably, in the 2000 U.S. Open at Pebble Beach – his first event in 21 months – shoot 68 in the opening round, which tied him for fourth with Hale Irwin and Loren Roberts, three shots behind eventual runaway winner Tiger Woods. Clampett admitted in interviews to being emotional because of how well his opening round went, and although he did not shoot better than 76 the rest of the tournament and tied for 37th, he still enjoyed a warm reception from crowds throughout.

During his 40s, Clampett competed periodically on the Nationwide Tour, and qualified into a PGA Tour event in November 2008. He became eligible for the Champions Tour after reaching age 50 in April 2010. On May 14, 2010, he tied for the first round lead in his second tournament on that tour.

=== Broadcasting career ===
Clampett joined CBS Sports as an on-course reporter for the 1991 PGA Championship, and joined CBS Sports full-time as a tower announcer in 1995. Clampett remained stationed at the 15th hole during CBS telecasts until 2006. In 2007, he was replaced by Ian Baker-Finch, coming over from ABC Sports. Clampett continued to work online webcasts streamed by CBS at the major championships and on CBS Sports Network. On April 11, 2008, Clampett apologized for referring to golfer Liang Wenchong as "the Chinaman" during the Masters Tournament at Augusta National Golf Club. Clampett, working the Internet broadcast of Amen Corner, made the comment after Liang missed the cut.

He was also the lead golf analyst for Turner Sports from 1996–2007.

Clampett and Andy Brumer co-authored the book "The Impact Zone: Mastering Golf's Moment of Truth", published in late 2007. Clampett has also become involved in golf course design in recent years.

== Personal life ==
Clampett lives in Bonita Springs, Florida with his second wife, Marianna. He has three children from his first marriage: Katelyn, Daniel, and Michael Clampett; and Marianna has two of her own: Nicholas and Anna Suciu.

Clampett was in the audience at a taping of The Price Is Right in 1985. As host Bob Barker was about to make his "inspiration putt" in the Hole In One game, he decided instead to ask Clampett to come up on stage to do it. (Clampett missed his 10 foot putt, but the contestant sank her one footer.)

== Amateur wins ==
- 1978 California State Amateur, Western Amateur, Porter Cup, Western Junior
- 1980 California State Amateur, Sunnehanna Amateur

== Professional wins (3) ==
=== PGA Tour wins (1) ===
No.	Date	Tournament	Winning score	Margin of victory	Runner-up
1	Sep 26, 1982	Southern Open	−14 (65-69-68-64=266)	2 strokes	(United States) Hale Irwin

PGA Tour playoff record (0–2)

No.	Year	Tournament	Opponents	Result
1	1981	Bing Crosby National Pro-Am	(United States) John Cook, (United States) Ben Crenshaw, (United States) Hale Irwin, (United States) Barney Thompson	Cook won with par on third extra hole Clampett, Crenshaw and Thompson eliminated by birdie on first hole
2	1981	Buick Open	(United States) Hale Irwin, (United States) Peter Jacobsen, (United States) Gil Morgan	Irwin won with birdie on second extra hole

=== PGA of Japan Tour wins (1) ===
No.	Date	Tournament	Winning score	Margin of victory	Runner-up
1	Nov 8, 1981	ABC Cup Japan vs USA	−17 (65-66-71-69=271)	7 strokes	(Japan) Akira Yabe

=== Other wins (1) ===
No.	Date	Tournament	Winning score	Margin of victory	Runner-up
1	Jan 5, 1980	Spalding Invitational (as an amateur)	−16 (70-66-65-71=272)	2 strokes	(United States) Mike Reid

Other playoff record (0–1)

No.	Year	Tournament	Opponents	Result
1	1979	Spalding Invitational (as an amateur)	(United States) George Bayer, (United States) Al Geiberger	Geiberger won with birdie on first extra hole

== Playoff record ==
European Tour playoff record (0–1)

No.	Year	Tournament	Opponent	Result
1	1981	Italian Open	(Spain) José María Cañizares	Lost to birdie on first extra hole

== Results in major championships ==
Tournament	1978	1979	1980	1981	1982	1983	1984	1985	1986	1987	...	2000
Masters Tournament		T23 LA	50			CUT						
U.S. Open	T30 LA	CUT	T38		T3	CUT			CUT			T37
The Open Championship					T10	T53						
PGA Championship				T27	CUT	CUT				T28		

Top 10
Did not play

LA = Low amateur
CUT = missed the half-way cut
"T" indicates a tie for a place

=== Summary ===
Tournament	Wins	2nd	3rd	Top-5	Top-10	Top-25	Events	Cuts made
Masters Tournament	0	0	0	0	0	1	3	2
U.S. Open	0	0	1	1	1	1	7	4
The Open Championship	0	0	0	0	1	1	2	2
PGA Championship	0	0	0	0	0	0	4	2
Totals	0	0	1	1	2	3	16	10

- Most consecutive cuts made – 5 (1980 Masters – 1982 Open Championship)
- Longest streak of top-10s – 2

== U.S. national team appearances ==
Amateur

- Eisenhower Trophy: 1978 (team winners and individual leader)

Professional

- World Cup: 1982

== See also ==
- 1990 PGA Tour Qualifying School graduates
