= Bruce Edwards (caddie) =

American caddie

- Born: November 16, 1954; Wethersfield, Connecticut, U.S.
- Died: April 8, 2004 (aged 49); Ponte Vedra Beach, Florida, U.S.
- Occupation: Caddie

Bruce Edwards (November 16, 1954 – April 8, 2004) was a long-time caddie for Hall of Fame golfer Tom Watson.

== Professional career ==
Edwards began caddying for Watson in 1973 and worked with him until 1989. Edwards left to assist Greg Norman but returned to Watson's side in 1992 and stayed until 2003. That year, he was diagnosed with amyotrophic lateral sclerosis (commonly known as Lou Gehrig's disease) but continued to caddie for Watson until the strain became too much.

His life is chronicled in Caddy For Life: The Bruce Edwards Story (ISBN 0-316-77788-9) written by his biographer John Feinstein.

== Personal life ==
At the age of 49, Edwards died from ALS at his home in Ponte Vedra Beach, Florida.

== Awards and honors ==
- In 2004, Edwards was inducted into the Caddie Hall of Fame
- In 2022, Edwards was inducted into the Connecticut Golf Hall of Fame
