= 1982 U.S. Open (golf) =

Coordinates: 36.568°N 121.950°W

Tournament information
- Dates: June 17–20, 1982
- Location: Pebble Beach, California
- Course: Pebble Beach Golf Links
- Tour: PGA Tour

Statistics
- Par: 72
- Length: 6,815 yards (6,232 m)
- Field: 152 players, 66 after cut
- Cut: 151 (+7)
- Prize fund: $375,000
- Winner's share: $60,000

Champion
- (United States) Tom Watson
- 282 (−6)

Location in the United States

The 1982 U.S. Open was the 82nd U.S. Open, held June 17–20 at Pebble Beach Golf Links in Pebble Beach, California. Tom Watson won his only U.S. Open, two strokes ahead of runner-up Jack Nicklaus, for the sixth of his eight major titles.

Watson also won the British Open a month later, to become the fifth player to win both Opens in the same year, joining Bobby Jones (1926, 1930), Gene Sarazen (1932), Ben Hogan (1953), and Lee Trevino (1971). It was later accomplished by Tiger Woods in 2000, the first half of his Tiger Slam; all six are Americans.

This was the third major played at the Pebble Beach Golf Links; Nicklaus won the U.S. Open in 1972 and Lanny Wadkins won the PGA Championship in 1977.

The total purse was $375,000, with a winner's share of $60,000.

== Course layout ==
Pebble Beach Golf Links

Hole	1	2	3	4	5	6	7	8	9	Out	10	11	12	13	14	15	16	17	18	In	Total
Yards	378	502	386	327	170	516	110	433	467	3,289	425	382	204	393	565	396	403	210	548	3,526	6,815
Par	4	5	4	4	3	5	3	4	4	36	4	4	3	4	5	4	4	3	5	36	72

== Round summaries ==
=== First round ===
Thursday, June 17, 1982
Winner of five professional majors, Watson entered the 1982 U.S. Open as one of the favorites and as the number one golfer in the world. A steady performer, he had six top-10 finishes in his previous eight U.S. Opens, but had never finished closer than three strokes from the leader.

Watson did not get off to a fast start and his even-par 72 opening round was nearly much worse; he was +3 through 14 holes when he began to catch fire, scoring three birdies on the final four holes. On a tough scoring day at Pebble Beach, the 72 put him just two back of first round leaders Bruce Devlin and Bill Rogers. Rogers was the defending British Open champion and was coming off the best year of his career. Jack Nicklaus opened with a disappointing 74. Nicklaus, though in the declining phase of his career, was considered a strong contender as well: he was a winner (at the time) of 17 professional majors including both the 1980 U.S. Open (where Watson had his best previous U.S. Open finish, third place) and the 1972 U.S. Open (the last U.S. Open held at Pebble Beach). Nicklaus had also finished one shot off the pace at the 1977 PGA Championship, the last professional major held at Pebble, a course he considered perhaps his favorite in the world.

Place	Player	Score	To par
T1	(Australia) Bruce Devlin	70	−2
T1	(United States) Bill Rogers	70	−2
T3	(United States) Bobby Clampett	71	−1
T3	(United States) Terry Diehl	71	−1
T3	(United States) Danny Edwards	71	−1
T3	(United States) Jim King	71	−1
T3	(United States) Calvin Peete	71	−1
T8	(United States) Butch Baird	72	E
T8	(United States) George Burns	72	E
T8	(United States) Lyn Lott	72	E
T8	(United States) Andy North	72	E
T8	(United States) Dan Pohl	72	E
T8	(United States) Ron Streck	72	E
T8	(United States) Jim Thorpe	72	E
T8	(United States) Tom Watson	72	E
T8	(United States) Fuzzy Zoeller	72	E

=== Second round ===
Friday, June 18, 1982
In the second round, Devlin surged into the lead with a brilliant 3-under 69. Devlin too was in the declining phase of his career, but had 17 wins worldwide by that time, and had 15 top tens in majors to his credit. His last major top 10, however, had been in 1973, and at 44 years of age, a win would have made him (at that time) the oldest winner of the U.S. Open. Larry Rinker also surged into contention with a blistering 5-under 67, putting him two back of Devlin. Rogers lost a little ground with a second round 73.

Watson, meanwhile, was grinding. As he later said of his second round, "I shot a 77 and scored a 72." A master of the short game, Watson made several saves from the thick U.S. Open rough thanks to his skill chipping and putting. He saved bogey twice from greater than 20 feet (6 m), and birdied the difficult 17th and 18th for the second straight round.

Place	Player	Score	To par
1	(Australia) Bruce Devlin	70-69=139	−5
2	(United States) Larry Rinker	74-67=141	−3
3	(United States) Scott Simpson	73-69=142	−2
T4	(United States) Lyn Lott	72-71=143	−1
T4	(United States) Andy North	72-71=143	−1
T4	(United States) Calvin Peete	71-72=143	−1
T4	(United States) Bill Rogers	70-73=143	−1
T8	(United States) George Burns	72-72=144	E
T8	(United States) Bobby Clampett	71-73=144	E
T8	(United States) Tom Kite	73-71=144	E
T8	(United States) Jack Nicklaus	74-70=144	E
T8	(United States) Tom Watson	72-72=144	E

Amateurs: Crosby (+6), Pavin (+7), Marlowe (+8), Faxon (+9), Wilson (+9), Nelson (+11), Wood (+12), Fogt (+13), Fuhrer (+13), Perry (+13), Player (+16), Bill (+17), Crowl (+18), Bliss (+22), Dupre (+22).

=== Third round ===
Saturday, June 19, 1982
Watson's Open turned around for him on the weekend, which he attributed to minor swing adjustments before the third round. On a day that saw a number of sub-70 rounds (including a 67 by Lanny Wadkins, who won the 1977 PGA Championship also played at Pebble Beach), Watson was the best of the leaders, firing a 4-under 68. The score was enough to give him a share of the third round lead with Bill Rogers, who returned to contention with a 69. Devlin, meanwhile, slipped with a 75 and would not be a factor on Sunday after the first few holes.

Place	Player	Score	To par
T1	(United States) Bill Rogers	70-73-69=212	−4
T1	(United States) Tom Watson	72-72-68=212	−4
T3	(United States) George Burns	72-72-70=214	−2
T3	(Australia) Bruce Devlin	70-69-75=214	−2
T3	(Australia) David Graham	73-72-69=214	−2
T3	(United States) Scott Simpson	73-69-72=214	−2
T7	(United States) Jack Nicklaus	74-70-71=215	−1
T7	(United States) Calvin Peete	71-72-72=215	−1
T9	(United States) Bobby Clampett	71-73-72=216	E
T9	(United States) Dan Pohl	72-74-70=216	E
T9	(United States) Larry Rinker	74-67-75=216	E
T9	(United States) Craig Stadler	76-70-70=216	E
T9	(United States) Lanny Wadkins	73-76-67=216	E

=== Final round ===
Sunday, June 20, 1982
Nicklaus, meanwhile, shot a 71 and was 3 shots behind the leaders. Nicklaus had not truly been a factor in the tournament, despite playing (according to him) some of his very best golf. His tee to green game had been excellent, but he was unable to make putts to score birdies. On Sunday, Nicklaus was one-over after the two relatively easy starting holes, and then electrified the tournament crowd with five consecutive birdies at 3, 4, 5, 6, and 7.

The tournament at that point essentially became a three-way battle between Nicklaus, Rogers, and Watson. Rogers and Watson were paired together three groups behind Nicklaus. Watson missed a short birdie putt at 7, and Rogers played steadily early. Rogers lost the lead with a three-putt bogey at nine and also bogeyed the tenth.

The tenth was a pivotal hole for Watson as well. Watson pushed his approach shot badly, nearly sending it over the cliff into Carmel Bay. That the ball remained in play was encouraging, but it was so embedded in thick rough that it was difficult to find - it looked to be all Watson could do to save bogey. With an aggressive hack at it, Watson was able to get the ball to the green, but 25 feet (8 m) short of the hole. But as he had been able to do in the second round, he struck another long saving putt into the cup for a par 4. Rogers later said the par save there was "unbelievable". After another 20-footer (for birdie) at 11, Watson was two strokes in front of Nicklaus.

Nicklaus regained a tie for the lead with a birdie putt on 15 while Watson bogeyed 12 and had to save par at 13. On the uphill par 5 14th, Watson holed a lengthy birdie putt that both he and his caddie (Bruce Edwards) called the best read Edwards had ever given Watson. Watson had over-hit his short approach shot, leaving the ball in perhaps the worst position on the green - well above the hole. Although 40 feet (12 m) in length, the putt required a very delicate touch. It was nearly impossible to stop the ball near the hole except by banging into the back of the cup and falling in - which is what Watson did.

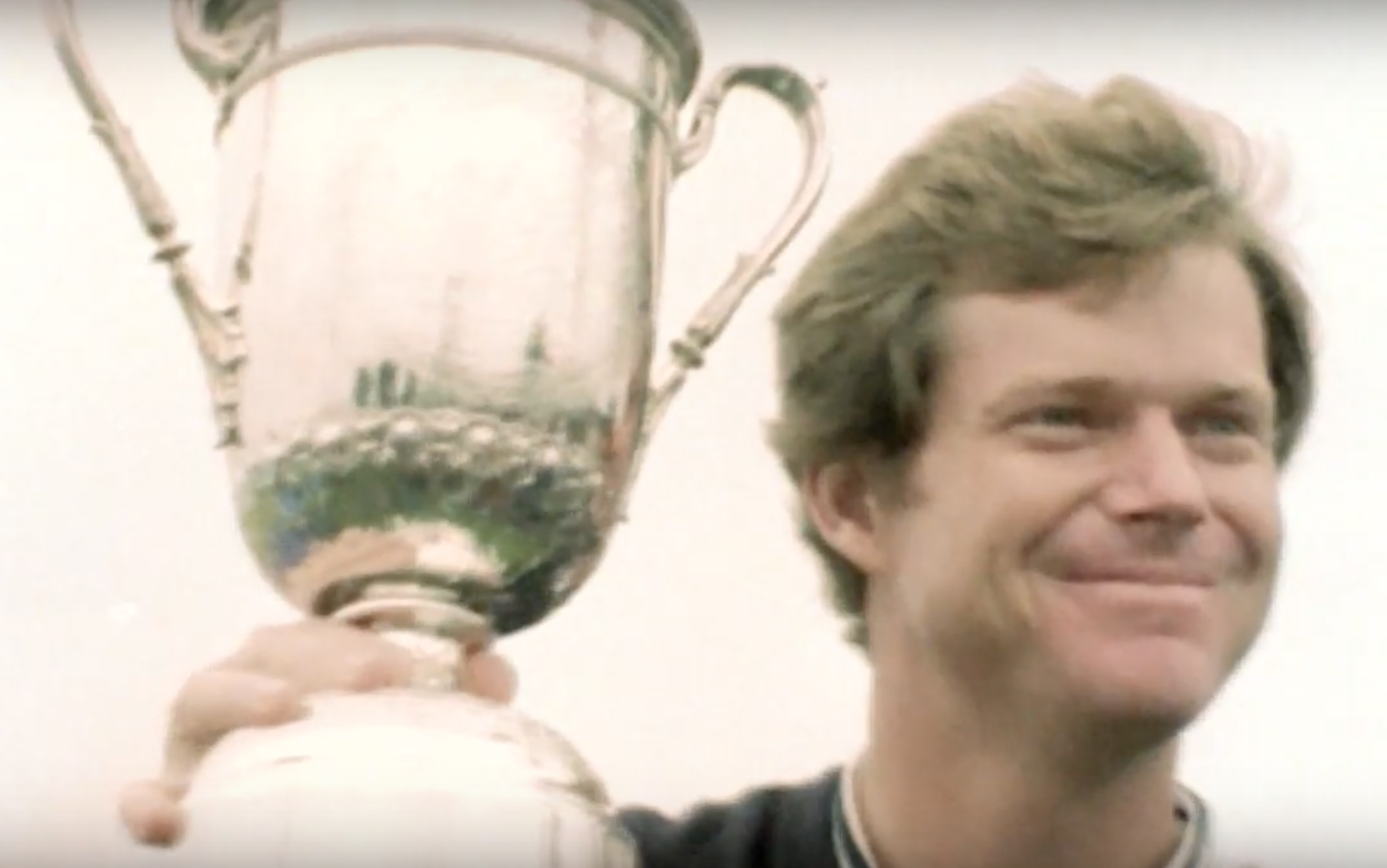
Watson with the U.S. Open Trophy

Watson's next brilliant putt was a miss for par - but he would credit it as one of his most important putts of a tournament won with his putting. His tee shot at 16 landed in a narrow neck of a fairway bunker, requiring Watson to come out sideways. His approach shot landed 60 feet (18 m) from the hole. Facing the prospect of a double bogey from that distance, Watson's severely breaking putt was nearly holed and his tap-in saved bogey.

Pebble Beach has two of the great closing holes in golf - a par three of nearly 200 yards (180 m) with a devilishly shaped green (17), and a par 5 hugging the cliffs of the Pacific Ocean (18). Watson had played these holes very well during the tournament, and would likely need to do so again to hold off Nicklaus, who was in the clubhouse at 4-under (shooting 69 on Sunday). The closing stretch began disastrously for Watson. His 2 iron at 17 sailed left of the flagstick and tumbled into the gnarly rough behind the green and above the hole. Nicklaus later said that, after seeing the tee shot on TV, he was confident he would at least have a chance at Watson in a playoff.

Watson knew he had a fairly good lie in the rough, but caddie Bruce Edwards also knew that the shot would be difficult to control and almost impossible to stop near the hole. There was a danger of failing to hit the shot crisply enough, leaving the ball above the hole with a slippery putt to follow, or of missing the hole and leaving a long uphill putt. Either scenario would likely lead to bogey. To remind Watson to, at all costs, give himself a chance to make another par putt, he told Watson, "Get it close." Watson replied, "Get it close? Hell, I'm going to sink it."

Indeed, he struck the chip and it bounced against the flagstick before dropping in. Watson jubilantly ran after it, pointing at Edwards, enjoying one of the great moments in golf history. His confidence carried over to the final hole, which he also birdied, giving him a hard-fought 70 and, at 6-under for the tournament, a two shot win over Nicklaus. It was the 18th runner-up finish at a major in Nicklaus's career (he would finish second again at the 1983 PGA Championship) and turned out to be his last best chance to win his fifth U.S. Open. Although he called it a heartbreaking defeat, Nicklaus was the first to congratulate Watson as he walked off the 18th green.

Place	Player	Score	To par	Money ($)
1	(United States) Tom Watson	72-72-68-70 = 282	−6	60,000
2	(United States) Jack Nicklaus	74-70-71-69 = 284	−4	34,506
T3	(United States) Bill Rogers	70-73-69-74 = 286	−2	14,967
T3	(United States) Dan Pohl	72-74-70-70 = 286	−2	14,967
T3	(United States) Bobby Clampett	71-73-72-70 = 286	−2	14,967
T6	(United States) Gary Koch	78-73-69-67 = 287	−1	8,011
T6	(Australia) David Graham	73-72-69-73 = 287	−1	8,011
T6	(United States) Lanny Wadkins	73-76-67-71 = 287	−1	8,011
T6	(United States) Jay Haas	75-74-70-68 = 287	−1	8,011
T10	(Australia) Bruce Devlin	70-69-75-74 = 288	E	6,332
T10	(United States) Calvin Peete	71-72-72-73 = 288	E	6,332

Amateurs: Nathaniel Crosby (+15), Corey Pavin (+16)

==== Scorecard ====
Hole	1	2	3	4	5	6	7	8	9	10	11	12	13	14	15	16	17	18
Par	4	5	4	4	3	5	3	4	4	4	4	3	4	5	4	4	3	5
(United States) Watson	−4	−5	−4	−4	−4	−4	−4	−4	−4	−4	−5	−4	−4	−5	−5	−4	−5	−6
(United States) Nicklaus	E	E	−1	−2	−3	−4	−5	−4	−4	−4	−3	−3	−3	−3	−4	−4	−4	−4
(United States) Clampett	E	−1	E	E	+1	E	−1	−1	−1	−1	−2	E	E	−1	−1	−1	−1	−2
(United States) Pohl	+1	+1	E	E	E	−1	−2	−2	−3	−3	−3	−2	−3	−3	−3	−2	−1	−2
(United States) Rogers	−4	−4	−4	−5	−5	−5	−5	−5	−4	−3	−3	−2	−2	−2	−2	−2	−2	−2
(Australia) Graham	−2	−3	−2	−2	−2	−2	−3	−2	−3	−3	−3	−3	−1	−1	−1	−1	−1	−1
(United States) Haas	+3	+2	+2	+2	+2	+1	+1	+1	+2	+2	+2	+1	+1	+1	E	−1	−1	−1
(United States) Koch	+4	+4	+3	+2	+1	+1	+2	+1	+2	+2	+2	+2	+1	+1	E	−1	−1	−1
(United States) Wadkins	E	−1	−1	−2	−2	−2	−3	−2	−2	−1	E	+1	+1	+1	E	E	−1	−1
(Australia) Devlin	−2	−3	−3	−3	−4	−5	−4	−4	−2	−2	−1	−1	−1	E	−1	+1	E	E
(United States) Peete	−1	−1	−1	−1	E	−1	−1	−1	−1	−1	−1	−1	−1	−1	−1	−1	E	E

Cumulative tournament scores, relative to par

Birdie	Bogey	Double bogey
