= 2005 U.S. Women's Open =

Coordinates: 39.643°N 104.963°W

Tournament information
- Dates: June 23–26, 2005
- Location: Cherry Hills Village, Colorado
- Course: Cherry Hills Country Club
- Organized by: USGA
- Tour: LPGA Tour

Statistics
- Par: 71
- Length: 6,749 yards (6,171 m)
- Field: 156 players, 63 after cut
- Cut: 150 (+8)
- Prize fund: $3.1 million
- Winner's share: $560,000

Champion
- (South Korea) Birdie Kim
- 287 (+3)

Location in the United States
Location in Colorado

The 2005 U.S. Women's Open was the 60th U.S. Women's Open, held June 23–26 at Cherry Hills Country Club in Cherry Hills Village, Colorado, a suburb south of Denver. The par-71 course was set at 6,749 yards (6,171 m), at an average elevation over 5,300 feet (1,620 m) above sea level. The event was televised by ESPN and NBC Sports.

Birdie Kim holed out from a greenside bunker on the 72nd hole to win her only major (and only LPGA) title, two strokes ahead of runners-up Brittany Lang and Morgan Pressel, both teenage amateurs from the United States. In the final pairing as a 54-hole co-leader, Pressel needed to hole her chip shot to tie, but it went 20 feet (6 m) past and she bogeyed. Lang had earlier missed a par putt from 8 feet (2.4 m). Lorena Ochoa made four birdies on the back nine and led with one hole remaining, but made a quadruple-bogey on the 72nd hole to finish four strokes behind.

Pressel, 17, held a share of the 54-hole lead, with Karen Stupples and amateur Michelle Wie, age 15; Kim was one stroke back in a three-way tie for fourth, with 18-year-old Paula Creamer and Young Jo.

This was the first U.S. Women's Open at Cherry Hills, which previously hosted three U.S. Opens (1938, 1960, 1978) and two PGA Championships (1941, 1985).

== Course layout ==
Hole	1	2	3	4	5	6	7	8	9	Out	10	11	12	13	14	15	16	17	18	In	Total
Yards	346	415	327	429	539	158	374	206	418	3,212	414	522	179	384	433	187	428	531	459	3,537	6,749
Par	4	4	4	4	5	3	4	3	4	35	4	5	3	4	4	3	4	5	4	36	71

- Average elevation is over 5,300 feet (1,620 m) above sea level

== Round summaries ==
=== First round ===
Thursday, June 23, 2005

Place	Player	Score	To par
T1	(United States) Angela Stanford	69	−2
T1	(United States) Michelle Wie (a)	69	−2
T3	(United States) Natalie Gulbis	70	−1
T3	(Sweden) Liselotte Neumann	70	−1
T3	(Chile) Nicole Perrot	70	−1
T3	(South Korea) Young-A Yang	70	−1
T7	(Sweden) Sophie Gustafson	71	E
T7	(United States) Meg Mallon	71	E
T7	(United States) Morgan Pressel (a)	71	E
T7	(Sweden) Annika Sörenstam	71	E

=== Second round ===
Friday, June 24, 2005

Place	Player	Score	To par
1	(Chile) Nicole Perrot	70-70=140	−2
T2	(Mexico) Lorena Ochoa	74-68=142	E
T2	(United States) Michelle Wie (a)	69-73=142	E
T4	(United States) Paula Creamer	74-69=143	+1
T4	(Australia) Rachel Hetherington	74-69=143	+1
T4	(United States) Angela Stanford	69-74=143	+1
T7	(France) Karine Icher	69-75=144	+2
T7	(United States) Morgan Pressel (a)	71-73=144	+2
T9	(Sweden) Helen Alfredsson	72-73=145	+3
T9	(United States) Amie Cochran (a)	76-69=145	+3
T9	(United States) Natalie Gulbis	70-75=145	+3
T9	(South Korea) Young Jo	74-71=145	+3
T9	(United States) Rosie Jones	73-72=145	+3
T9	(Canada) Lorie Kane	74-71=145	+3
T9	(United States) Cristie Kerr	74-71=145	+3
T9	(South Korea) Mi-Hyun Kim	72-73=145	+3
T9	(United States) Meg Mallon	71-74=145	+3
T9	(Scotland) Catriona Matthew	73-72=145	+3
T9	(Sweden) Liselotte Neumann	72-73=145	+3
T9	(South Korea) Se Ri Pak	74-71=145	+3
T9	(England) Karen Stupples	75-70=145	+3

=== Third round ===
Saturday, June 25, 2005

Place	Player	Score	To par
T1	(United States) Morgan Pressel (a)	71-73-70=214	+1
T1	(England) Karen Stupples	75-70-69=214	+1
T1	(United States) Michelle Wie (a)	69-73-72=214	+1
T4	(United States) Paula Creamer	74-69-72=215	+2
T4	(South Korea) Young Jo	74-71-70=215	+2
T4	(South Korea) Birdie Kim	74-72-69=215	+2
T7	(South Korea) Young Kim	73-73-70=216	+3
T7	(United States) Angela Stanford	69-74-73=216	+3
T9	(United States) Jamie Hullett	75-72-70=217	+4
T9	(United States) Cristie Kerr	74-71-72=217	+4
T9	(Taiwan) Candie Kung	73-73-71=217	+4

=== Final round ===
Sunday, June 26, 2005

Place	Player	Score	To par	Money ($)
1	(South Korea) Birdie Kim	74-72-69-72=287	+3	560,000
T2	(United States) Brittany Lang (a)	69-77-72-71=289	+5	0
T2	(United States) Morgan Pressel (a)	71-73-70-75=289	+5	0
T4	(United States) Natalie Gulbis	70-75-74-71=290	+6	272,723
T4	(Canada) Lorie Kane	74-71-76-69=290	+6	272,723
T6	(France) Karine Icher	69-75-75-72=291	+7	116,310
T6	(South Korea) Young Jo	74-71-70-76=291	+7	116,310
T6	(Taiwan) Candie Kung	73-73-71-74=291	+7	116,310
T6	(Mexico) Lorena Ochoa	74-68-77-72=291	+7	116,310
T10	(United States) Cristie Kerr	74-71-72-75=292	+8	80,523
T10	(United States) Angela Stanford	69-74-73-76=292	+8	80,523
T10	(England) Karen Stupples	75-70-69-78=292	+8	80,523

==== Scorecard ====
Hole	1	2	3	4	5	6	7	8	9	10	11	12	13	14	15	16	17	18
Par	4	4	4	4	5	3	4	3	4	4	5	3	4	4	3	4	5	4
(South Korea) Kim	+3	+3	+3	+3	+2	+3	+2	+2	+2	+3	+2	+2	+2	+3	+3	+4	+4	+3
(United States) Lang	+5	+6	+6	+7	+7	+8	+7	+7	+7	+6	+6	+5	+5	+5	+5	+5	+4	+5
(United States) Pressel	+1	E	E	+1	+2	+3	+3	+3	+3	+3	+3	+3	+4	+4	+4	+4	+4	+5
(South Korea) Jo	+3	+4	+4	+4	+4	+4	+5	+5	+5	+5	+5	+5	+5	+5	+6	+6	+6	+7
(Mexico) Ochoa	+6	+6	+6	+7	+7	+7	+7	+7	+7	+6	+5	+5	+4	+4	+4	+3	+3	+7
(United States) Stanford	+3	+3	+4	+4	+5	+5	+4	+5	+7	+6	+6	+6	+6	+6	+7	+7	+8	+8
(England) Stupples	+2	+1	+1	+1	+2	+3	+4	+4	+5	+5	+5	+6	+6	+7	+7	+7	+7	+8
(United States) Creamer	+4	+4	+4	+4	+6	+6	+6	+6	+7	+7	+6	+6	+6	+6	+6	+7	+10	+10
(Sweden) Sörenstam	+7	+8	+8	+8	+8	+8	+8	+8	+9	+9	+8	+8	+8	+8	+9	+10	+11	+12
(United States) Wie	+3	+3	+4	+5	+5	+5	+5	+6	+8	+9	+8	+9	+11	+11	+12	+11	+11	+12

Cumulative tournament scores, relative to par

Eagle	Birdie	Bogey	Double bogey	Triple bogey+
