= Jack Grout =

American professional golfer (1910–1989)

Personal information
- Full name: John Frederick Grout
- Nationality: United States
- Born: March 24, 1910 Oklahoma City, Oklahoma, U.S.
- Died: May 13, 1989 (aged 79) Tequesta, Florida, U.S.
- Height: 6 ft 2 in (1.88 m)
- Weight: 185 lb (84 kg; 13.2 st)
- Spouse: Bonnie Ann Fox
- Children: 4

Career
- Sport: Golf
- Turned professional: 1927
- Former tour: PGA Tour
- Professional wins: 4

Best results in major championships
- Masters Tournament: DNP
- PGA Championship: T9: 1941, 1945
- U.S. Open: T51: 1947
- The Open Championship: DNP

John Frederick Grout (March 24, 1910 – May 13, 1989) was an American professional golfer. From 1931 to 1953, Grout competed on the PGA Tour. Though he taught many Hall of Fame players, he is best known as the "first and only" golf teacher of Jack Nicklaus. In 2016, he was inducted into the Golf Magazine World Golf Teachers Hall of Fame.

== Early life ==
In 1910, Grout was born in Oklahoma City, Oklahoma. In 1918, at the age of 8, his golf career began as a caddie at the old Oklahoma City Golf & Country Club.

Many of Grout's siblings became high-level golfers. His older brother Dick played in the 1926 PGA Championship and the 1929 U.S. Open. Also, Dick won the Oklahoma Open in 1927 and 1929. His younger brother Raymond (Dutch) played in the 1934 U.S. Open and, later that same year, won the Oklahoma State Open Match-Play Championship. His youngest sister Jenny was one of the greatest female golfers in Oklahoma history. She won both the state high school girls' championship in 1934 and the state amateur championship in 1937.

== Professional career ==
In 1927, at the age of seventeen, he was named the golf professional at Edgemere Country Club in Oklahoma City. On October 30, 1929, just one day after the stock market collapsed, he was elected to membership in the PGA.

In 1930, he and brother Dick moved from Oklahoma City to Fort Worth, Texas. There, the older Grout began working as the head professional at Glen Garden Country Club. It was at Glen Garden where Jack Grout, employed as his brother's assistant, became friends and playing partners with 18-year-old Byron Nelson and 17-year-old Ben Hogan. Both would later become two of the top players in golf history.

Grout made his PGA Tour début on December 18, 1931, playing in the Pasadena Open at Brookside Park Golf Course. He remained a regular member on the pro circuit until 1945. Though he had one of the finest swings in the game, he was never among the Tour's top money winners because of extreme near-sightedness as well as having a chronic back condition.

In 1941, Grout's unofficial tournament earnings totaled over $4,200. According to PGA Tour statistics, he ranked #25 with $2,389 in official money. His best finish came in the St. Augustine Professional-Amateur where he and his partner Frank Allan placed second to Sam Snead and his partner Wilford Wehrle. Other top ten finishes that year included: third (tie), Hershey Open; fourth (tie), Atlantic City Open; fifth, Thomasville Open; seventh (tie), Harlingen Open; eighth (tie), Florida West Coast Open; ninth (tie), Miami Open and ninth (tie) in the PGA Championship at Cherry Hills in Denver, Colorado. Again, in 1942, he ranked #25 on the PGA Tour in official money. In 1943, according to PGA Tour Player Rankings, he was ranked #18.

Grout departed Fort Worth in early 1937 and spent the next three years at Hershey Country Club in Hershey, Pennsylvania, as an assistant to Henry Picard. At that time, Picard was one of the top players on the tour. Through Grout's association with Picard, he was exposed to new theories on golf technique that had been advanced in the 1920s and 1930s by Alex Morrison, a controversial West Coast professional. It was Morrison's coaching which primarily took Picard to stardom.

=== Instructor ===
In many respects, Morrison, who courted publicity, was well ahead of his time. So, in his own quiet way, was Grout. By 1950, at Scioto Country Club in Columbus, Ohio, when he started to work with the ten-year-old novice Jack Nicklaus, he had arrived at a very sound understanding of the golf swing –- a plexus of Morrison's ideas, Picard's ideas, and his own.

As Grout saw it, his Six Fundamentals were a base on which to build an outstanding swing. He felt strongly that the absolute first thing you must have is a Good Grip on the club; a grip that will naturally, and unconsciously, deliver the club face square to the target at impact. Second, Set Up Correctly because that important maneuver determines how you will swing the club. Third, maintain a Steady Head position throughout the swing. His fourth fundamental was Proper Footwork because it promotes both good balance and full swinging. The basis of footwork is rolling your ankles correctly while keeping your knees flexed at all times. Fundamental 5 called for Full Extension. A golfer should try to develop the widest possible arc by making a full shoulder turn and fully extending his arms on the backswing and downswing. Grout's sixth fundamental was the importance of having Quiet Hands (passive hands) at the start of the downswing. While the feet actually initiate the downswing, the arms, not the hands, must swing the club through the ball. Asked about putting, later in his career, Grout stated that, if he had it to do over, he would have taught Nicklaus to putt cross-handed. Nicklaus later quoted Grout and said that golfers new to the game should learn to putt left hand low (right-handed golfers).

Grout and Nicklaus worked together as coach and student from the time Nicklaus began golf in 1950. They developed a unique arrangement where Nicklaus would visit Grout at the start of each new season to review fundamentals, virtually from scratch. Nicklaus would consult Grout periodically for tune-ups and minor modifications, away from the Tour, if he was struggling for form, but Nicklaus primarily stayed with the knowledge he acquired with Grout. Grout made annual visits to the Masters, U.S. Open, and PGA Championship but seldom instructed Nicklaus at major tournament sites. Grout believed in self-sufficiency, that a golfer had to be in charge of his own swing. His conviction was that a golfer could achieve his full potential only by being self-reliant. He is quoted as saying: "The golfer who must fall back on a teacher every time any little thing sours in his game cannot but have a limited future."

Nicklaus would recall his teacher this way: “He knew the golf swing probably as well as any instructor ever has. But I think his greatest gift to his students was his belief in them and his ability to get them to believe in themselves. He wanted you not only to be skilled technically, but also to be so confident of your skills that you could identify and fix your own swing flaws even in the heat of battle, even without him there by your side. In other words, Jack Grout worked to be dispensable. He wanted his students to be able to function at the highest level without him.”

=== Late career ===
Grout completed his PGA Tour career by playing in the 1956 U.S. Open at Oak Hill Country Club in Rochester, New York. In October 1961, he moved his family to Miami Beach, Florida where he became pro at La Gorce Country Club. Grout held that position until 1974 when, at the age of 64, he decided to say farewell to the day-to-day responsibilities of a head professional and accept the invitation of Jack Nicklaus to become the teacher-in-chief and professional emeritus at his Muirfield Village Golf Club in Dublin, Ohio.

During the late 1970s and 1980s, Grout held wintertime teaching professional positions at Frenchman's Creek Country Club in Palm Beach Gardens, Florida and, later at The Loxahatchee Club in Jupiter, Florida. Throughout his long career, Grout played a pivotal role in the development of many fine players. His reputation for having a non-irritating manner, an uncanny eye in spotting flaws and a knack for transmitting simple solutions to what seemed like complicated problems attracted such golfers as Jack Nicklaus, Raymond Floyd, Tommy Aaron, Joe Turnesa, Dow Finsterwald, Ben Crenshaw, Grier Jones, DeWitt Weaver, Marty Fleckman, J. C. Snead, Gibby Gilbert, Jerry Heard, Roger Maltbie, Tom Purtzer, Lanny Wadkins, Bruce Devlin, Jim Colbert, Butch Baird, George Burns III, Jerry McGee, Fred Ridley, Steve Melnyk and Olin Browne. Additionally, Grout peered at the swings of quite a few LPGA Tour players, including; Barbara Romack, Jo Ann Prentice, Maria Astrologes, Beth Stone, Kathy Cornelius, Kathy Farrer, Dianne Dailey, Silvia Bertolaccini, Sandra Spuzich and Sally Little.

== Personal life ==
In 1989, at the age of 79, Grout died in Tequesta, Florida. He and Bonnie Ann (Fox), his wife of 46 years, had four children. He is interred beside her in Riverside Memorial Park in Tequesta, Florida.

His son, Dick, was also a high-level golfer. He qualified for the 1979 U.S. Open.

== Awards and honors ==
In 2016, Grout was inducted into Golf Magazine's World Golf Teachers Hall of Fame.

== Professional wins (4) ==
- 1938 Mid-South Pro/Pro (with Henry Picard; tie with Tommy Armour and Bobby Cruickshank)
- 1941 Radio City Invitational
- 1945 Illinois PGA Championship
- 1948 Spring Lake Invitational

== Bibliography ==
- Let Me Teach You Golf As I Taught Jack Nicklaus, by Jack Grout, 1974, Atheneum.
- On The Lesson Tee, Basic Golf Fundamentals, by Jack Grout, 1982, The Athletic Institute.
- Jack Grout's Golf Clinic, Jack Nicklaus' Teacher and Coach, by Jack Grout, 1985, The Athletic Institute.
- Jack Grout, A Legacy in Golf, by Dick Grout, 2012, Blue River Press.
