= Pomonok Country Club =

Country club in Pomonok, Queens, New York

- Location within the United States Location within New York Location within New York City
- 40.734°N 73.810°W

Club information
- Location: Pomonok, Queens, New York, U.S.
- Elevation: 80 feet (25 m)
- Established: 1886, 1921 (closed 1949)
- Type: Private
- Tota holes: 18
- Tournaments: PGA Championship (1939)
- Designed by: Devereux Emmet
- Par: 72
- Length: 6,354 yards (5,810 m)

Pomonok Country Club was a country club in the northeastern United States, located in what is now the Pomonok neighborhood of the New York City borough of Queens. The golf course was located between Kissena Boulevard and 164th Street, just to the south of Horace Harding Boulevard (now the Long Island Expressway) and to the east of Queens College.

The club was established in 1886 by members of the Flushing Athletic Club in southern Flushing and moved to the Kissena Boulevard location in 1921. Devereux Emmet designed the golf course; the members disbanded and sold the course in 1949. Part of the site today contains the Electchester cooperative housing development, Pomonok public housing, and an extension of Parsons Boulevard.

The golf course hosted the PGA Championship in 1939, in which Henry Picard defeated Byron Nelson in the final in 37 holes. The match play event was held in July during the New York World's Fair, which was located at Flushing Meadows–Corona Park, approximately two miles (3 km) northwest.

The former course of Fresh Meadow Country Club was a few miles east (40.733°N 73.78°W); it hosted the PGA Championship in 1930 and the U.S. Open in 1932. That course was sold in 1946 for development and the club moved to Lake Success, five miles (8 km) northeast.
