= 1939 PGA Championship =

Coordinates: 40.734°N 73.810°W

Tournament information
- Dates: July 9–15, 1939
- Location: Queens, New York, U.S.
- Course: Pomonok Country Club
- Organized by: PGA of America
- Tour: PGA Tour
- Format: Match play - 6 rounds

Statistics
- Par: 72
- Length: 6,354 yards (5,810 m)
- Field: 109 players, 64 to match play
- Cut: 148 (+4), playoff
- Prize fund: $10,600
- Winner's share: $1,100

Champion
- (United States) Henry Picard
- def. Byron Nelson, 37 holes

Location in the United States
Location in New York
Location in New York City

The 1939 PGA Championship was the 22nd PGA Championship, held July 9–15 at Pomonok Country Club in Queens, New York. Then a match play championship, Henry Picard won his only PGA Championship, defeating Byron Nelson with a birdie at the 37th hole. It was the second of his two major titles; he won the Masters in 1938. Nelson won the U.S. Open three months earlier and the next PGA Championship in 1940. Beginning in 1939, he made five finals in six PGA Championships, and won his second title in 1945.

Picard had not trailed and led by two as late as the 26th hole, but the match was squared on the 29th green and Nelson led by one after 32 holes. Both birdied the par-5 33rd and Picard sank a curling putt from over twenty feet (6 m) for par to halve the 34th hole and stay one back. They halved the par-3 35th at par and both had birdie putts on the 36th green. Nelson missed his from ten feet (3 m) feet while Picard sank his from three to square up the match. On the extra hole, both again had birdie putts: Picard made his from ten feet while Nelson missed his from six.

Defending champion Paul Runyan lost in the quarterfinals to Dick Metz.

This PGA Championship was held during the 1939 New York World's Fair. The golf course no longer exists; Pomonok Country Club disbanded in 1949 and the property was developed for residences.

== Format ==
The match play format at the PGA Championship in 1939 called for 12 rounds (216 holes) in seven days:

- Sunday and Monday – 36-hole stroke play qualifier, 18 holes per day;
  - defending champion and top 63 professionals advanced to match play
- Tuesday – first two rounds, 18 holes each
- Wednesday – third round – 36 holes
- Thursday – quarterfinals – 36 holes
- Friday – semifinals – 36 holes
- Saturday – final – 36 holes

== Final results ==
Saturday. July 15, 1939

Place	Player	Money ($)
1	(United States) Henry Picard	1,100
2	(United States) Byron Nelson	600
T3	(United States) Dutch Harrison	350
T3	(United States) Dick Metz	350
T5	(United States) Emerick Kocsis	250
T5	(United States) Rod Munday	250
T5	(United States) Paul Runyan	250
T5	(United States) Horton Smith	250

== Final eight bracket ==
Quarter-finals; July 13
Henry Picard	2&1
Rod Munday
Dick Metz	2&1
Paul Runyan
Byron Nelson	10&9
Emerick Kocsis
Dutch Harrison	4&3
Horton Smith

Semi-finals; July 14
Henry Picard	1up
Dick Metz
Byron Nelson	9&8
Dutch Harrison

Finals; July 15
Henry Picard	37h
Byron Nelson

== Final match scorecards ==
Morning

Hole	1	2	3	4	5	6	7	8	9	10	11	12	13	14	15	16	17	18
Par	4	4	3	5	4	3	4	4	4	3	5	5	4	4	5	4	3	4
(United States) Picard	4	5	3	4	4	3	4	4	4	3	3	5	4	3	5	4	2	4
(United States) Nelson	5	3	4	5	4	4	4	4	2	3	4	4	4	3	4	4	3	3
Leader	P1	–	P1	P2	P2	P3	P3	P3	P2	P2	P3	P2	P2	P2	P1	P1	P2	P1

Afternoon

Hole	1	2	3	4	5	6	7	8	9	10	11	12	13	14	15	16	17	18
Par	4	4	3	5	4	3	4	4	4	3	5	5	4	4	5	4	3	4
(United States) Picard	4	3	3	4	3	3	4	4	4	3	5	5	4	4	4	4	3	3
(United States) Nelson	3	5	3	5	3	3	4	4	3	3	4	5	4	3	4	4	3	4
Leader	–	P1	P1	P2	P2	P2	P2	P2	P1	P1	–	–	–	N1	N1	N1	N1	–

Extra hole

Hole	1
Par	4
(United States) Picard	3
(United States) Nelson	4
Leader	P1

Eagle	Birdie	Bogey
