= Andy North =

American professional golfer (born 1950)

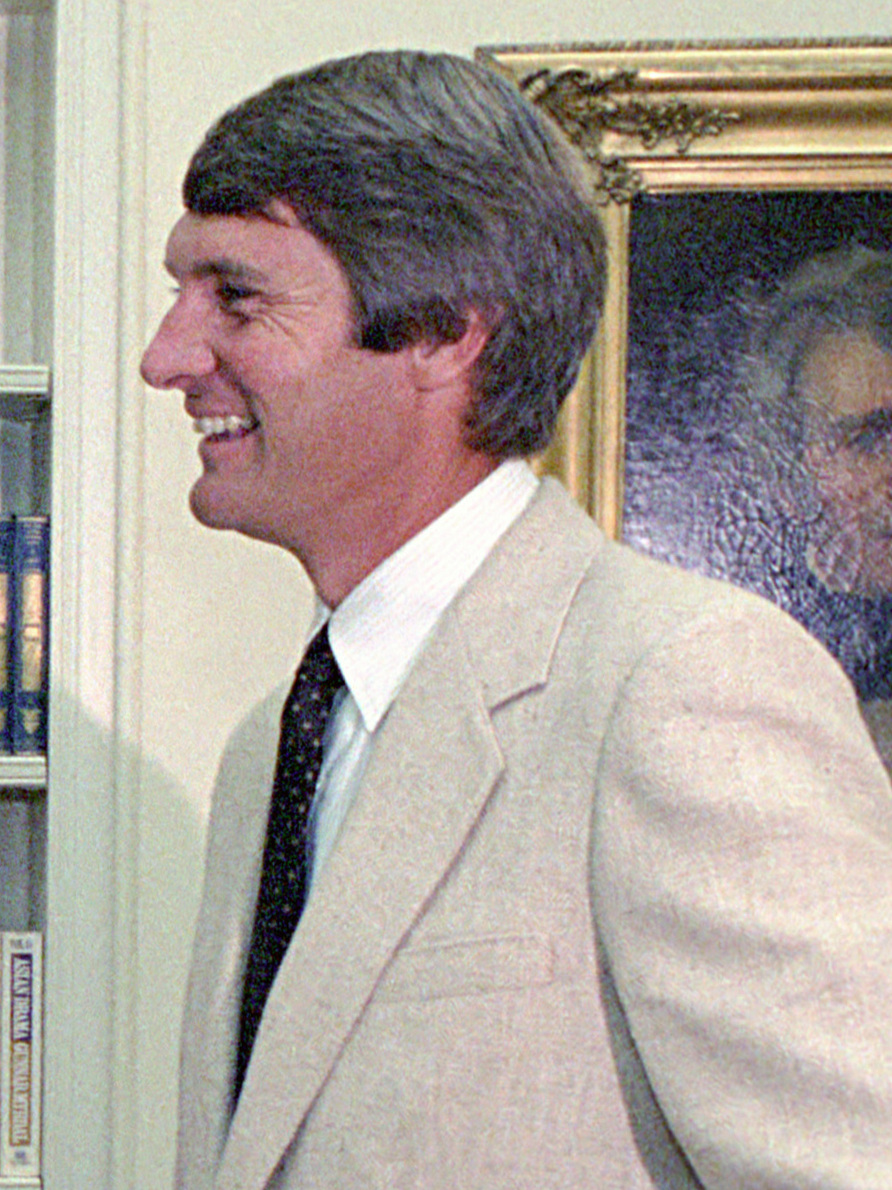
- North in the Oval Office in 1985

Personal information
- Full name: Andrew Stewart North
- Nationality: United States
- Born: March 9, 1950 (age 76) Thorp, Wisconsin, U.S.
- Height: 6 ft 4 in (1.93 m)

Career
- Sport: Golf
- College: University of Florida
- Turned professional: 1972
- Former tours: PGA Tour; Champions Tour
- Professional wins: 15

Number of wins by tour
- PGA Tour: 3
- PGA Tour Champions: 1
- Other: 11

Best results in major championships (wins: 2)
- Masters Tournament: T12: 1979
- PGA Championship: 4th: 1975
- U.S. Open: Won: 1978, 1985
- The Open Championship: T39: 1990

Andrew Stewart North (born March 9, 1950) is an American professional golfer who had three wins on the PGA Tour, including the U.S. Open twice. Since 1992, he has served as a golf analyst for ESPN.

== Early life ==
North was born in Thorp, Wisconsin, and raised in Monona, Wisconsin.

He attended Monona Grove High School, graduating in 1968. While still in high school, he lost in the final match of the Wisconsin State Amateur Match Play Championship at Merrill Hills Country Club. Two years later, he won the 1969 Wisconsin State Amateur Championship at Westmoor Country Club in Brookfield, Wisconsin by defeating Archie Dadian in the match play final.

== Amateur career ==
North accepted an athletic scholarship to attend the University of Florida in Gainesville, Florida. He played for coach Buster Bishop's Florida Gators men's golf team from 1969 to 1972. He was a three-time first-team All-Southeastern Conference (SEC) selection, and an All-American in 1970, 1971 and 1972. North graduated from Florida with a bachelor's degree in business administration in 1972 and was later inducted into the University of Florida Athletic Hall of Fame as "Gator Great."

== Professional career ==
In 1972, North turned professional. He had a moderately successful career on the PGA Tour made remarkable by the fact that two of his three wins on tour were in the U.S. Open. The first PGA Tour win of North's career came at the 1977 American Express Westchester Classic. The following year he won the 1978 U.S. Open at Cherry Hills Country Club in Cherry Hills Village, Colorado. He moved into the lead after the second round, and was one shot ahead going into Sunday, but an erratic final round left him needing to make a five on the last hole to take the championship. He struggled at the 18th hole finding the rough twice and then landing in a greenside bunker. However, he made a four-foot putt to win by one stroke over J. C. Snead and Dave Stockton.

At the 1985 U.S. Open, on the South Course at Oakland Hills Country Club in Bloomfield Hills, Michigan, North found himself two shots behind Chen Tze-chung of Taiwan going into the final round, but three shots clear of the rest of the field. Chen moved into a four-shot lead early, but threw the tournament wide open by shooting a quadruple bogey eight on the fifth hole. The lead swung between North, Chen, Denis Watson, Payne Stewart, and Dave Barr. However, North went into the last hole with a two-shot lead, and his bogey five was enough to give him a second major championship.

North played on the 1985 Ryder Cup team. In 1990, he won the PGA Grand Slam of Golf. Since turning 50 in 2000, North has played intermittently on the Champions Tour. His best finish at this level is a win at the 2008 Liberty Mutual Legends of Golf.

=== Broadcasting career ===
In 1992, North joined ESPN as an on-course reporter. In 2004, he was promoted to the lead on-course reporter for ESPN and ABC Sports. He also has been the lead analyst on ESPN's golf studio shows with host Scott Van Pelt since 2003. According to ESPN, his preview shows for major championships have been so in-depth that Tour players have been known to watch them to help with course strategy. From 2003 to 2014, North concluded his U.S. Open preview show by dressing up in a doctor's outfit and using an often modified formula to pick the winner of the tournament. North eliminates groups of players who he believes will not win by writing them on large white placards which he then tosses over the edge of the set. In addition, North occasionally serves as a substitute analyst for Wisconsin Badgers men's basketball radio broadcast.

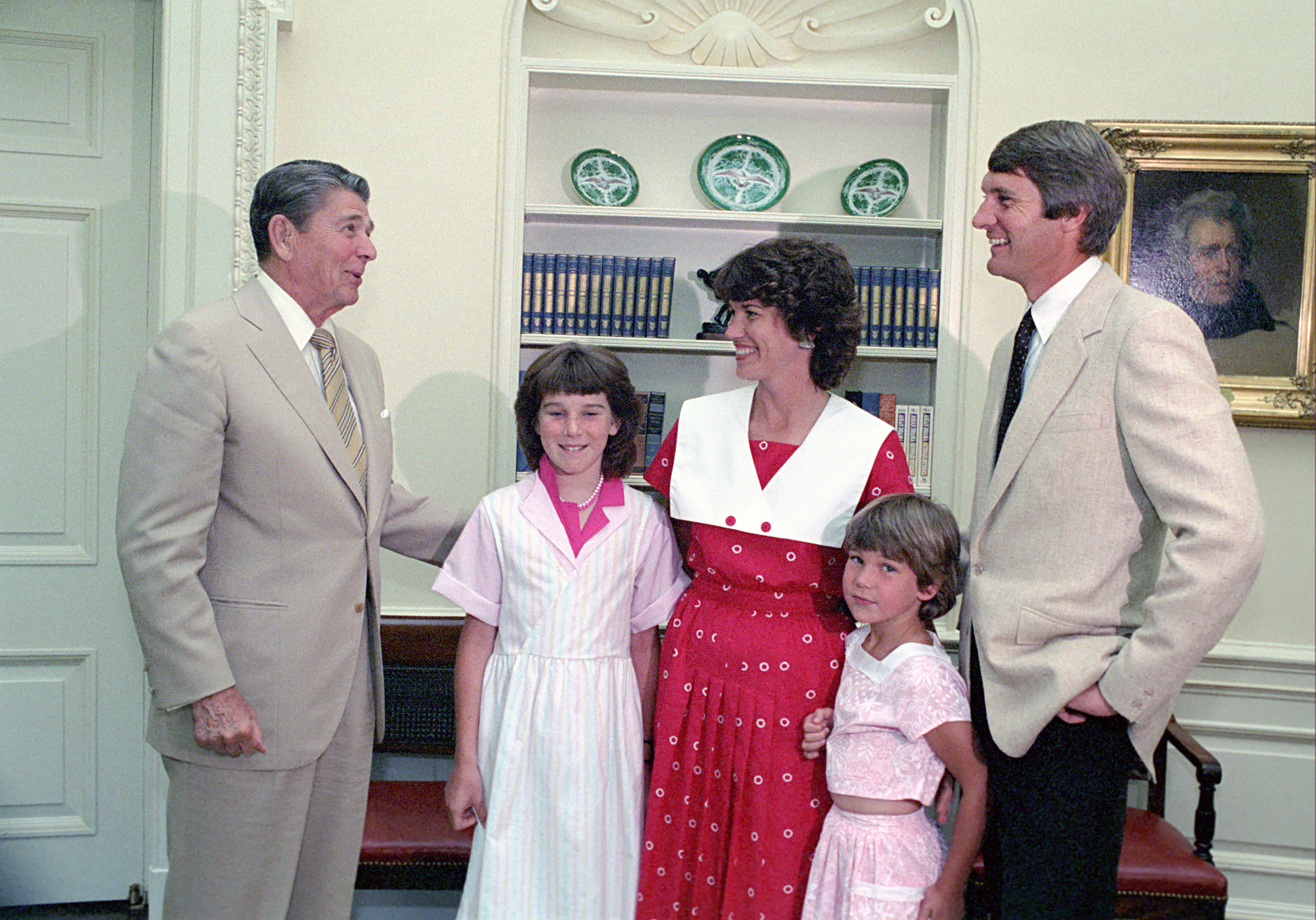
President Ronald Reagan with North and his Family, at the White House in 1985

== Awards and honors ==
- In 1970, 1971, and 1972, North earned All-American honors while at the University of Florida.
- In addition, while at college he was a three-time first-team Southeastern Conference selection.
- In 1975, North was inducted into the University of Florida Athletic Hall of Fame as "Gator Great."
- In 1998, he was elected to the Wisconsin Athletic Hall of Fame.

== Amateur wins ==
- 1969 Wisconsin Amateur
- 1971 Western Amateur

== Professional wins (15) ==
=== PGA Tour wins (3) ===
Legend
Major championships (2)
Other PGA Tour (1)

No.	Date	Tournament	Winning score	To par	Margin of victory	Runner(s)-up
1	Aug 21, 1977	American Express Westchester Classic	66-70-65-71=272	−12	2 strokes	(United States) George Archer
2	Jun 18, 1978	U.S. Open	70-70-71-74=285	+1	1 stroke	(United States) J. C. Snead, (United States) Dave Stockton
3	Jun 16, 1985	U.S. Open (2)	70-65-70-74=279	−1	1 stroke	(Canada) Dave Barr, (Taiwan) Chen Tze-chung, (Zimbabwe) Denis Watson

=== South American wins (1) ===
- 1980 Center Open

=== Other wins (5) ===
No.	Date	Tournament	Winning score	To par	Margin of victory	Runner(s)-up
1	Dec 3, 1978	World Cup (with (United States) John Mahaffey)	141-144-138-141=564	−12	10 strokes	Australia − Wayne Grady and Greg Norman
2	Aug 7, 1979	PGA Grand Slam of Golf	73	+3	Shared title with (South Africa) Gary Player	
3	May 28, 1990	PGA Grand Slam of Golf (2)	70	−2	4 strokes	(United States) Craig Stadler
4	Jul 31, 1990	Jerry Ford Invitational	68-65=133	−10	Shared title with (United States) Jim Gallagher Jr. and (United States) Donnie Hammond	
5	Jun 28, 2005	ING Par-3 Shootout	$350,000		$260,000	(United States) Gary McCord

=== Champions Tour wins (1) ===
No.	Date	Tournament	Winning score	To par	Margin of victory	Runners-up
1	Apr 27, 2008	Liberty Mutual Legends of Golf (with (United States) Tom Watson)	59-62-64=185	−31	1 stroke	(United States) Jeff Sluman and (United States) Craig Stadler

Champions Tour playoff record (0–1)

No.	Year	Tournament	Opponent	Result
1	2001	Emerald Coast Classic	(United States) Mike McCullough	Lost to par on first extra hole

=== Other senior wins (5) ===
- 2000 Liberty Mutual Legends of Golf (with Jim Colbert)
- 2001 Liberty Mutual Legends of Golf (with Jim Colbert)
- 2005 Liberty Mutual Legends of Golf - Raphael Division (with Tom Watson)
- 2006 Liberty Mutual Legends of Golf - Raphael Division (with Tom Watson)
- 2007 Liberty Mutual Legends of Golf - Raphael Division (with Tom Watson)

== Major championships ==
=== Wins (2) ===
Year	Championship	54 holes	Winning score	Margin	Runners-up
1978	U.S. Open	1 shot lead	+1 (70-70-71-74= 285)	1 stroke	(United States) J. C. Snead, (United States) Dave Stockton
1985	U.S. Open (2)	2 shot deficit	−1 (70-65-70-74=279)	1 stroke	(Canada) Dave Barr, (Taiwan) Chen Tze-chung, (Zimbabwe) Denis Watson

=== Results timeline ===
Tournament	1974	1975	1976	1977	1978	1979
Masters Tournament			T37	T24	T32	T12
U.S. Open		T12	T14	CUT	1	T11
The Open Championship						CUT
PGA Championship	T39	4	T49	CUT	T42	CUT

Tournament	1980	1981	1982	1983	1984	1985	1986	1987	1988	1989
Masters Tournament	T24	CUT	CUT	T30	T41			CUT	T36	CUT
U.S. Open	T8	T43	T22	T10	CUT	1	67	CUT	CUT	CUT
The Open Championship	T45								T47	
PGA Championship	T15	T11	T70	CUT		CUT	CUT	CUT	CUT	T58

Tournament	1990	1991	1992	1993	1994	1995
Masters Tournament	T27					
U.S. Open	T51	T37	CUT	CUT	CUT	CUT
The Open Championship	T39					
PGA Championship						

Win
Top 10
Did not play

CUT = missed the halfway cut
"T" indicates a tie for a place.

=== Summary ===
Tournament	Wins	2nd	3rd	Top-5	Top-10	Top-25	Events	Cuts made
Masters Tournament	0	0	0	0	0	3	13	9
U.S. Open	2	0	0	2	4	8	21	12
The Open Championship	0	0	0	0	0	0	4	3
PGA Championship	0	0	0	1	1	3	15	8
Totals	2	0	0	3	5	14	53	32

- Most consecutive cuts made – 7 (1974 PGA – 1977 Masters)
- Longest streak of top-10s – 1 (five times)

== Results in The Players Championship ==
Tournament	1974	1975	1976	1977	1978	1979	1980	1981	1982	1983	1984	1985	1986	1987	1988	1989	1990	1991	1992	1993	1994	1995
The Players Championship	T49	T34	CUT	CUT	T4	T20	CUT	T69	T32	CUT	CUT	T55	CUT	T54	71	CUT	CUT	T27	CUT			CUT

Top 10
Did not play

CUT = missed the halfway cut
"T" indicates a tie for a place

== U.S. national team appearances ==
Professional

- Ryder Cup: 1985
- World Cup: 1978 (winners)

== See also ==
- 1972 PGA Tour Qualifying School graduates
- List of American Ryder Cup golfers
- List of Florida Gators men's golfers on the PGA Tour
- List of golfers with most PGA Tour wins
- List of University of Florida alumni
- List of University of Florida Athletic Hall of Fame members
