= Birdie Kim =

South Korean professional golfer (born 1981)

Birdie Kim 김주연
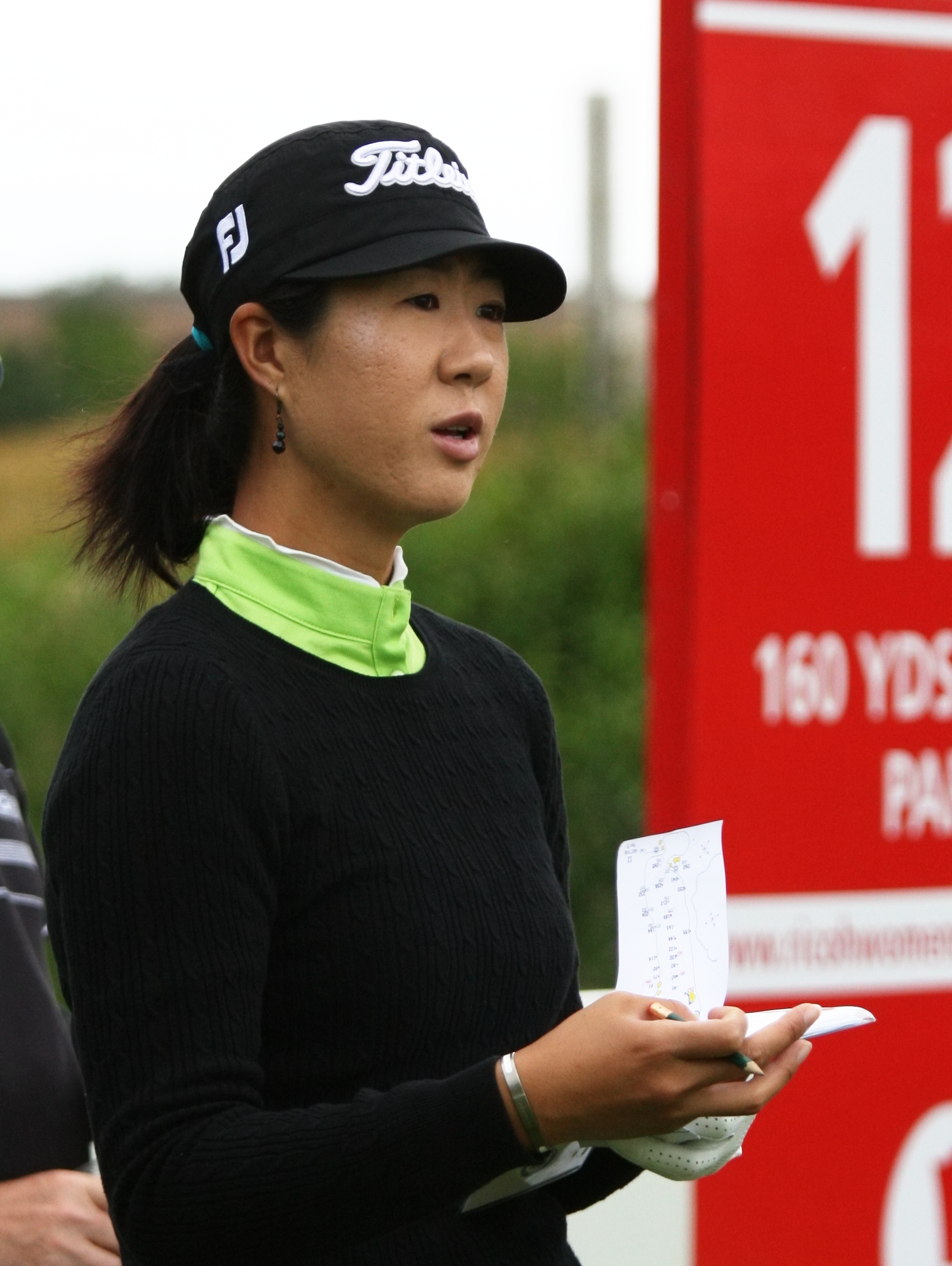
- Kim before 2009 Women's British Open

Personal information
- Full name: Birdie Kim
- Nationality: South Korea
- Born: 26 August 1981 (age 45) Iksan, South Korea
- Height: 5 ft 9 in (1.75 m)
- Spouse: Bae Gyu Lee (m.2007)

Career
- Sport: Golf
- College: Korea University
- Turned professional: 2000
- Former tours: LPGA Tour (2004–2015); Symetra Tour (2001–2003, 2012)
- Professional wins: 4

Number of wins by tour
- LPGA Tour: 1
- Epson Tour: 3

Best results in LPGA major championships (wins: 1)
- Chevron Championship: T45: 2006
- Women's PGA C'ship: T25: 2007
- U.S. Women's Open: Won: 2005
- Women's British Open: CUT: 2005, 2006, 2007, 2009
- Evian Championship: DNP
Medal record
Asian Games
Silver medal – second place	1998 Bangkok	Women's team

Birdie Kim (Korean: 김주연; born Kim Ju-Yun 26 August 1981) is a South Korean professional golfer. Her career highlight is winning the 2005 U.S. Women's Open at Cherry Hills Country Club. In the last round, she was tied for the lead on the 18th hole with amateurs Morgan Pressel and Brittany Lang. Her second shot found a green-side bunker. She holed out from the bunker to take the lead and ultimately won by two strokes.

Kim won the 1998–99 Korea Junior Championship. She turned professional in November 2000 and joined the Futures Tour, which is the second-tier women's golf tour in the United States, in 2001. Her rookie season on the main LPGA Tour was 2004, and was not successful as she only made three cuts in 20 events, but she retained her tour card by finishing tied 12th at the Qualifying School. She did somewhat better in early 2005, and picked up her first top ten finish that May, but her victory at the U.S. Women's Open was totally unexpected.

She changed her first name to Birdie in 2004, in an effort to distinguish herself from the numerous other Korean golfers named Kim in the women's golf world in the minds of non-Koreans. Kim is a common surname in Korea, especially on the LPGA Tour.

In 2005, Kim earned a total of $715,006 and came in 13th for LPGA season money position. She married fellow pro golfer Bae Kyu Lee in December 2007.

A 2009 car accident derailed Kim's career and she had trouble making cuts on the LPGA. In 2012, she played in 12 events on the Symetra Tour, finishing second on the money list. Kim last played an LPGA-sanctioned event in 2015. Like Janet Alex in 1982 and Hilary Lunke in 2003, the U.S. Open was her only LPGA Tour win.

== Professional wins ==
=== LPGA Tour wins (1) ===
Legend
LPGA Tour major championships (1)
Other LPGA Tour (0)

No.	Date	Tournament	Winning score	To par	Margin of victory	Runners-up
1	26 Jun 2005	U.S. Women's Open	74-72-69-72=287	+3	2 strokes	(United States) Brittany Lang (United States) Morgan Pressel

=== Futures Tour wins ===
- 2001 Chumash Casino Futures Classic, Southwestern Bell Futures Classic
- 2003 Bank of Ann Arbor Futures Classic

== Major championships ==
=== Wins (1) ===
Year	Championship	Winning score	Margin	Runners-up
2005	U.S. Women's Open	+3 (74-72-69-72=287)	2 strokes	(United States) Brittany Lang, (United States) Morgan Pressel

=== Results timeline ===
Results not in chronological order before 2015.

Tournament	2004	2005	2006	2007	2008	2009	2010	2011	2012	2013	2014	2015
ANA Inspiration			T45	CUT	CUT	CUT	CUT					
Women's PGA Championship	CUT	41	T65	T25	CUT	CUT		CUT				
U.S. Women's Open		1	CUT	T16	CUT	CUT		CUT	CUT	CUT	CUT	CUT
Women's British Open		CUT	CUT	CUT		CUT						
The Evian Championship ^												

^ The Evian Championship was added as a major in 2013.

Win
Top 10
Did not play

CUT = missed the half-way cut
"T" = tied

=== Summary ===
- Starts – 26
- Wins – 1
- 2nd-place finishes – 0
- 3rd-place finishes – 0
- Top 3 finishes – 1
- Top 5 finishes – 1
- Top 10 finishes – 1
- Top 25 finishes – 3
- Missed cuts – 20
- Most consecutive cuts made – 2 (thrice)
- Longest streak of top-10s – 1

== Team appearances ==
Professional

- Lexus Cup (representing Asia team): 2005
