= Anthracite Open =

Golf tournament

The Anthracite Open was a golf tournament played at Scranton Country Club, Scranton, Pennsylvania. It was played in 1939 and 1940. An event was planned for 1941 but was canceled.

The 1939 event was played from June 23 to 25 and was won by Henry Picard with a score of 273, six ahead of Sam Snead. The 1940 event was played from September 6 to 8. The tournament was won by Sam Snead who finished two ahead of Byron Nelson.

== Winners ==
Year	Player	Country	Score	To par	Margin of victory	Runner(s)-up	Winner's share ($)	Ref
1940	Sam Snead	United States	276	−4	2 strokes	(United States) Byron Nelson	1,200	
1939	Henry Picard	United States	273	−7	6 strokes	(United States) Sam Snead	1,200	
