= 1938 Masters Tournament =

Tournament information
- Dates: April 2–4, 1938
- Location: Augusta, Georgia; 33.503°N 82.020°W
- Course: Augusta National Golf Club
- Organized by: Augusta National Golf Club
- Tour: PGA Tour

Statistics
- Par: 72
- Field: 42 players
- Cut: None
- Prize fund: $5,000
- Winner's share: $1,500

Champion
- (United States) Henry Picard
- 285 (−3)

Location map
- Location in the United States Location in Georgia

The 1938 Masters Tournament was the fifth Masters Tournament, held April 2–4 at Augusta National Golf Club in Augusta, Georgia. Due to adverse weather conditions, the first round was delayed until Saturday, rounds 2 and 3 were played on Sunday, and the final round was on Monday. The tournament was at this point still officially named the "Augusta National Invitation Tournament", and would not officially adopt the Masters Tournament name until the following year in 1939.

Henry Picard led by one stroke after 54 holes and shot 70 in the final round to win his only Masters, two strokes ahead of runners-up Harry Cooper and Ralph Guldahl. It was the first of two major titles for Picard, who won the PGA Championship in 1939.

The purse was $5,000 with a winner's share of $1,500. Ben Hogan made his Masters debut and finished tied for 25th. Tournament host Bobby Jones finished in the top twenty for the second and final time.

== Field ==
1. Masters champions

Byron Nelson (7,9,10,12), Gene Sarazen (2,4,6,7,9,10), Horton Smith (7,9)

2. U.S. Open champions

Billy Burke (9,10), Ralph Guldahl (7,9,10), Bobby Jones (3,4,5,9), Willie Macfarlane (9), Tony Manero (7,9,12), Sam Parks Jr. (10)

3. U.S. Amateur champions

Lawson Little (5,9), Jess Sweetser (5,a)

4. British Open champions

Denny Shute (6,7,9,10,12)

5. British Amateur champions

6. PGA champions

Johnny Revolta (7,9,10), Paul Runyan (9,10)

7. Members of the U.S. 1937 Ryder Cup team

Ed Dudley (9,10), Henry Picard (10,12), Sam Snead (9,10)

8. Members of the U.S. 1938 Walker Cup team

Chuck Kocsis (10,a), Tommy Suffern Tailer (a), Bud Ward (11,a), Charlie Yates (9,a)

- Ray Billows (11,a), Johnny Fischer (3,11,a), Johnny Goodman (2,3,5,10,11,a), Fred Haas (a) and Reynolds Smith (11,a) did not play. Tailer was a reserve for the team.

9. Top 30 players and ties from the 1937 Masters Tournament

Harry Cooper (10,12), Wiffy Cox, Bobby Cruickshank (10), Leonard Dodson, Vic Ghezzi (10), Jimmy Hines (10,12), Ky Laffoon (10,12), Ray Mangrum (10), Felix Serafin, Jimmy Thomson (10), Al Watrous, Craig Wood

- Tommy Armour, Clarence Clark (10) and Al Espinosa did not play.

10. Top 30 players and ties from the 1937 U.S. Open

Leo Mallory, Jug McSpaden (12), Toney Penna, Frank Strafaci (a), Frank Walsh

- Al Brosch, Jimmy Demaret, Fred Morrison, Pat Sawyer and Bob Stupple did not play.

11. 1937 U.S. Amateur quarter-finalists

- Chick Evans (2,3,a) and Don Moe (a) did not play.

12. 1937 PGA Championship quarter-finalists

13. Two players, not already qualified, with the best scoring average in the winter part of the 1938 PGA Tour

Ben Hogan, Dick Metz

14 Foreign invitations

Stanley Horne, Ross Somerville (11,a)

== Round summaries ==
=== First round ===
Saturday, April 2, 1938

| Place | Player | Score | To par |
|---|---|---|---|
| 1 | (United States) Harry Cooper | 68 | −4 |
| T2 | (United States) Ed Dudley | 70 | −2 |
| T2 | (United States) Dick Metz | 70 | −2 |
| T4 | (United States) Toney Penna | 71 | −1 |
| T4 | (United States) Henry Picard | 71 | −1 |
| T4 | (United States) Paul Runyan | 71 | −1 |
| T7 | (United States) Bobby Cruickshank | 72 | E |
| T7 | (United States) Lawson Little | 72 | E |
| T7 | (United States) Tony Manero | 72 | E |
| T7 | (United States) Jug McSpaden | 72 | E |
| T7 | (United States) Felix Serafin | 72 | E |

=== Second round ===
Sunday, April 3, 1938 (morning)

| Place | Player | Score | To par |
|---|---|---|---|
| 1 | (United States) Ed Dudley | 70-69=139 | −5 |
| T2 | (United States) Ralph Guldahl | 73-70=143 | −1 |
| T2 | (United States) Henry Picard | 71-72=143 | −1 |
| T2 | (United States) Felix Serafin | 72-71=143 | −1 |
| T5 | (United States) Paul Runyan | 71-73=144 | E |
| T5 | (United States) Jimmy Thomson | 74-70=144 | E |
| T7 | (United States) Harry Cooper | 68-77=145 | +1 |
| T7 | (United States) Johnny Revolta | 73-72=145 | +1 |
| T9 | (United States) Jimmy Hines | 75-71=146 | +2 |
| T9 | (United States) Billy Burke | 73-73=146 | +2 |

=== Third round ===
Sunday, April 3, 1938 (afternoon)

| Place | Player | Score | To par |
|---|---|---|---|
| 1 | (United States) Henry Picard | 71-72-72=215 | −1 |
| T2 | (United States) Harry Cooper | 68-77-71=216 | E |
| T2 | (United States) Ed Dudley | 70-69-77=216 | E |
| T2 | (United States) Ralph Guldahl | 73-70-73=216 | E |
| T2 | (United States) Gene Sarazen | 78-70-68=216 | E |
| 6 | (United States) Byron Nelson | 73-74-70=217 | +1 |
| 7 | (United States) Paul Runyan | 71-73-74=218 | +2 |
| 8 | (United States) Vic Ghezzi | 75-74-70=219 | +3 |
| 9 | (United States) Jimmy Thomson | 74-70-76=220 | +4 |
| T10 | (United States) Jimmy Hines | 75-71-75=221 | +5 |
| T10 | (United States) Lawson Little | 72-75-74=221 | +5 |
| T10 | (United States) Dick Metz | 70-77-74=221 | +5 |
| T10 | (United States) Johnny Revolta | 73-72-76=221 | +5 |
| T10 | (United States) Felix Serafin | 72-71-78=221 | +5 |

=== Final round ===
Monday, April 4, 1938

==== Final leaderboard ====
Champion
Silver Cup winner (low amateur)
(a) = amateur
(c) = past champion

Top 10
| Place | Player | Score | To par | Money (US$) |
|---|---|---|---|---|
| 1 | (United States) Henry Picard | 71-72-72-70=285 | −3 | 1,500 |
| T2 | (United States) Harry Cooper | 68-77-71-71=287 | −1 | 700 |
| T2 | (United States) Ralph Guldahl | 73-70-73-71=287 | −1 | 700 |
| 4 | (United States) Paul Runyan | 71-73-74-70=288 | E | 500 |
| 5 | (United States) Byron Nelson (c) | 73-74-70-73=290 | +2 | 400 |
| T6 | (United States) Ed Dudley | 70-69-77-75=291 | +3 | 275 |
| T6 | (United States) Felix Serafin | 72-71-78-70=291 | +3 | 275 |
| T8 | (United States) Dick Metz | 70-77-74-71=292 | +4 | 175 |
| T8 | (United States) Jimmy Thomson | 74-70-76-72=292 | +4 | 175 |
| T10 | (United States) Vic Ghezzi | 75-74-70-74=293 | +5 | 100 |
| T10 | (United States) Jimmy Hines | 75-71-75-72=293 | +5 | 100 |
| T10 | (United States) Lawson Little | 72-75-74-72=293 | +5 | 100 |

Leaderboard below the top 10
| Place | Player | Score | To par | Money ($) |
|---|---|---|---|---|
| T13 | (United States) Billy Burke | 73-73-76-73=295 | +7 | |
| T13 | (United States) Gene Sarazen (c) | 78-70-68-79=295 | +7 | |
| 15 | (Canada) Stanley Horne | 74-74-77-71=296 | +8 | |
| T16 | (United States) Bobby Jones | 76-74-72-75=297 | +9 | |
| T16 | (United States) Jug McSpaden | 72-75-77-73=297 | +9 | |
| T18 | (United States) Bobby Cruickshank | 72-75-77-74=298 | +10 | |
| T18 | (United States) Ray Mangrum | 78-72-76-72=298 | +10 | |
| T18 | (United States) Johnny Revolta | 73-72-76-77=298 | +10 | |
| T18 | (United States) Tommy Suffern Tailer (a) | 74-69-75-80=298 | +10 | |
| T22 | (United States) Chuck Kocsis (a) | 76-73-77-73=299 | +11 | |
| T22 | (United States) Horton Smith (c) | 75-75-78-71=299 | +11 | |
| 24 | (United States) Sam Parks Jr. | 75-75-76-74=300 | +12 | |
| T25 | (United States) Wiffy Cox | 74-78-74-75=301 | +13 | |
| T25 | (United States) Ben Hogan | 75-76-78-72=301 | +13 | |
| T27 | (United States) Ky Laffoon | 78-76-74-74=302 | +14 | |
| T27 | (United States) Tony Manero | 72-78-82-70=302 | +14 | |
| T27 | (United States) Frank Walsh | 74-75-77-76=302 | +14 | |
| T27 | (United States) Al Watrous | 73-77-76-76=302 | +14 | |
| T31 | (United States) Toney Penna | 71-76-77-80=304 | +16 | |
| T31 | (United States) Sam Snead | 78-78-75-73=304 | +16 | |
| 33 | (United States) Jess Sweetser (a) | 82-75-73-75=305 | +17 | |
| T34 | (United States) Leo Mallory | 76-75-81-74=306 | +18 | |
| T34 | (United States) Craig Wood | 73-75-83-75=306 | +18 | |
| T36 | (Canada) Ross Somerville (a) | 77-78-82-71=308 | +20 | |
| T36 | (United States) Bud Ward (a) | 77-76-79-76=308 | +20 | |
| 38 | (United States) Willie Macfarlane | 76-80-75-78=309 | +21 | |
| 39 | (United States) Charlie Yates (a) | 76-78-82-76=312 | +24 | |
| WD | (United States) Frank Strafaci (a) | 74-74-82=230 | +14 | |
| WD | (United States) Denny Shute | 75-78-78=231 | +15 | |
| WD | (United States) Leonard Dodson | 78-78=156 | +12 | |
