= Colorado Academy =

Location
- 3800 South Pierce Street; Denver, Colorado 80235; United States; 39°38′52″N 105°4′9″W

Information
- Type: Private
- Motto: Spiritus Vitam Vivificat ("Spirit Enlivens Life")
- Established: 1906 (120 years ago)
- CEEB code: 060393
- Head of school: Michael G. Davis
- Faculty: 150
- Grades: Pre-K to 12
- Enrollment: 965 (as of 2018)
- Average class size: 17
- Student to teacher ratio: 9:1
- Hours in school day: 8:10 a.m. - 3:30 p.m.
- Campus size: 94 acres (380,000 m^{2})
- Colors: Red, black, white
- Athletics: CHSAA 3A, 4A, 5A
- Athletics conference: Metro League, Southern League
- Mascot: Mustang
- Nickname: Gus
- Team name: Mustangs
- Rival: Kent Denver
- Publication: Kokopelli Literary Magazine
- Yearbook: Telesis
- Website: www.coloradoacademy.org

Colorado Academy (CA) is an independent nonsectarian, co-educational, college preparatory day school for students from Pre-Kindergarten through Twelfth Grade. The school's 94-acre (380,000 m^{2}) campus is located in Lakewood, Colorado, and serves approximately 1000 students. The program is based on academics, arts and athletics, and has a self-proclaimed mission statement to develop "curious, kind, courageous and adventurous learners and leaders". CA follows a trimester calendar, with grades issued at the conclusion of each term. Classes in all divisions follow a six-day rotating schedule.

== History ==
Colorado Academy was established in 1906 as the Hill School for Boys in the Capitol Hill neighborhood of Denver, Colorado, and by 1923 was called the Colorado Military School. Military training was incorporated into the curriculum. The school outgrew its space during World War II and in 1947, moved from its location near the University of Denver to its present location in Lakewood, just outside the Denver city limits. In 1955, the school began shifting its focus away from military training. Under the leadership of F. Charles Froelicher, Colorado Academy emerged as a college preparatory school for boys. The school became coeducational in 1971.

Today, the school has three different divisions: Lower School (Pre-Kindergarten – Grade 5), Middle School (Grades 6–8), and Upper School (Grades 9–12).

== Campus ==
The school's present campus was purchased in 1947. Known as the Kirk estate, it was the country home of Jesse Welborn, president of the Colorado Fuel and Iron Company. The campus has buildings for each division, including an upper school building that opened in January 2013. It features an innovation laboratory for the engineering department, as well as expanded science labs and classrooms. The campus includes two libraries: a lower school library and the standalone Raether Library for middle and upper school. It also includes the Ponzio Arts Center, the Schotters Music Building, the historic Welborn House, Smith Center, a field house and athletic center, a campus center with a cafeteria, and a performing arts center. The CA campus also has a number of athletic fields and playing surfaces, such as Stuie's Courts (8 tennis courts), Wright Field, Simms Field, Firman Field, Slater and Newton Fields (synthetic turf) and a baseball field with a synthetic turf infield that was renovated in 2014.

== Notable alumni ==
- Teel Bivins, United States Ambassador to Sweden, 2004–06
- Dorothy Hamill, Olympic Champion 1976 figure skater
- Mark Hubbard, PGA Golfer
- Devon Wills (class of 2002), lacrosse player, U.S. women's national team member
- Paul Wylie, Olympic figure skater
- Ji-young Yoo (class of 2017), actress

== Former headmasters ==
- F. Charles Froelicher (1955–1975)
- Sir Frank Wallace (1976–1990)
- Christopher H. Babbs (1991–2008)
- Mike Davis (2009–Present)

== Ranking ==
According to Niche, Colorado Academy ranks as #1 in Best Private K-12 School in Colorado and is among the top 100 of all private K-12 schools nationwide.
