= Tournament of the Gardens Open =

Golf tournament formerly on the PGA Tour

The Tournament of the Gardens Open was a golf tournament on the PGA Tour from 1933 to 1937. It was held at the Country Club of Charleston in Charleston, South Carolina, which in 2019 hosted the U.S. Women's Open.

Three-time winner Henry Picard was the head professional at the Country Club of Charleston until 1934.

== Winners ==
Year	Winner	Score	Purse ($)	Winner's share ($)	Ref
1933	Walter Hagen	282 (−2)	2,500	700	
1934	Paul Runyan	273 (−11)	2,500	700	
1935	Henry Picard	278 (−6)	3,000	750	
1936	Henry Picard	278 (−6)	3,000	750	
1937	Henry Picard	282 (−2)	5,000	1,250	
