= Hershey Open =

Golf tournament

Coordinates: 40.298°N 76.63°W

Tournament information
- Location: Hershey, Pennsylvania, U.S.
- Established: 1933
- Course: Hershey Country Club
- Par: 73
- Length: 7,000 yards (6,400 m)
- Tour: PGA Tour
- Prize fund: $5,000
- Final year: 1941

Tournament record score
- Aggregate: 275 Ben Hogan (1941)
- To par: −17 same

Final champion
- (United States) Ben Hogan
- Location in United States Location in Pennsylvania

The Hershey Open was a golf tournament in Pennsylvania on the PGA Tour from 1933 to 1941. It was played at the Hershey Country Club in Hershey on what is now called the West Course. It was played as a 72-hole stroke play event every year except 1938. That year, it was played as a 126-hole round-robin match play tournament with eight two-man teams and called the Hershey Four-Ball; its format was identical to the one used by the Inverness Invitational Four-Ball. The event was not held in 1940, when the club hosted the PGA Championship.

Three times it was won by the resident golf pro—Henry Picard in 1936 and 1937 and Ben Hogan in his first year at Hershey in 1941. His win in 1938 in the team event with Vic Ghezzi was Hogan's first as a professional; his first win as an individual came in March 1940 in North Carolina.

== Winners ==
Year	Player	Country	Score	To par	Margin of victory	Runner(s)-up	Winner's share ($)	Ref
Hershey Open
1941	Ben Hogan	United States	275	−17	5 strokes	(United States) Lloyd Mangrum	1,200	
1940	No tournament – hosted PGA Championship							
1939	Felix Serafin	United States	284	−8	2 strokes	(United States) Jimmy Hines (United States) Ben Hogan	1,200	
Hershey Four-Ball
1938	Vic Ghezzi and Ben Hogan	United States; United States	+17		15 points	(United States) Paul Runyan and (United States) Sam Snead	550 (each)	
Hershey Open
1937	Henry Picard (2)	United States	280	−12	3 strokes	(United States) Ralph Guldahl	1,200	
1936	Henry Picard	United States	287	−5	1 stroke	(United States) Jimmy Thomson	1,200	
1935	Ted Luther	United States	290	−2	Playoff	(United States) Felix Serafin	1,000	
1934	Ky Laffoon	United States	286	−6	5 strokes	(United States) Ed Dudley (United States) Joe Turnesa		
1933	Ed Dudley	United States	288	−4	10 strokes	(United States) Al Espinosa	500	
