= 1940 PGA Championship =

Coordinates: 40.298°N 76.63°W

Tournament information
- Dates: August 26 – September 2, 1940
- Location: Hershey, Pennsylvania, U.S.
- Course: Hershey Country Club
- Organized by: PGA of America
- Tour: PGA Tour
- Format: Match play - 6 rounds

Statistics
- Par: 73
- Length: 7,017 yards (6,416 m)
- Field: 120 players, 64 to match play
- Cut: 154 (+8), playoff
- Prize fund: $11,050
- Winner's share: $1,100

Champion
- (United States) Byron Nelson
- def. Sam Snead, 1 up

Location in the United States
Location in Pennsylvania

The 1940 PGA Championship was the 23rd PGA Championship, held August 26 to September 2 at Hershey Country Club in Hershey, Pennsylvania, east of Harrisburg. Then a match play championship, Byron Nelson won his first PGA Championship, defeating Sam Snead 1 up in the 36-hole final. It was the third of Nelson's five major titles; he won the PGA Championship again in 1945. From 1939 to 1945, Nelson made five of the six finals, missing only in 1942 (not held in 1943).

Defending champion and host professional Henry Picard lost in the third round to Gene Sarazen. Also out in the third round was five-time champion Walter Hagen, age 47, in his last PGA Championship match. He gained his last win in the second round over Vic Ghezzi, the champion the following year in 1941. Hagen ended his career with a 40–10 (.800) match record in the event. He played one last time at age 49 in the qualifier in 1942, but did not advance to match play.

Heavy rains on Saturday stopped play halfway through the semifinals which were completed on Sunday; the final round was pushed back to Monday, which was Labor Day.

Dick Metz was the medalist in the stroke play qualifier at 140 (−6); he lost 2 and 1 in the third round to Nelson. Two-time champion Denny Shute qualified at 151, but was rushed to a local hospital for an emergency appendectomy that night.

== Format ==
The match play format at the PGA Championship in 1940 called for 12 rounds (216 holes) in seven days:

- Monday and Tuesday – 36-hole stroke play qualifier, 18 holes per day;
  - defending champion and top 63 professionals advanced to match play
- Wednesday – first two rounds, 18 holes each
- Thursday – third round – 36 holes
- Friday – quarterfinals – 36 holes
- Saturday – semifinals – 36 holes (finished on Sunday)
- Sunday – final – 36 holes (played on Monday)

== Final results ==
Monday, September 2, 1940

Place	Player	Money ($)
1	(United States) Byron Nelson	1,100
2	(United States) Sam Snead	600
T3	(United States) Ralph Guldahl	350
T3	(United States) Jug McSpaden	350
T5	(United States) Ben Hogan	250
T5	(United States) Eddie Kirk	250
T5	(United States) Paul Runyan	250
T5	(United States) Gene Sarazen	250

== Final eight bracket ==
Quarter-finals; August 30
Byron Nelson	6&5
Eddie Kirk
Ralph Guldahl	3&2
Ben Hogan
Sam Snead	1up
Gene Sarazen
Jug McSpaden	8&6
Paul Runyan

Semi-finals; August 31 – September 1
Byron Nelson	1up
Ralph Guldahl
Sam Snead	5&4
Jug McSpaden

Finals; September 2
Byron Nelson	1up
Sam Snead

== Final match scorecards ==
Morning

Hole	1	2	3	4	5	6	7	8	9	10	11	12	13	14	15	16	17	18
Par	4	4	5	4	3	5	4	4	3	5	4	5	5	3	4	4	4	3
(United States) Nelson	4	4	5	4	3	4	4	4	3	5	3	5	4	3	5	4	4	3
(United States) Snead	4	4	5	4	3	5	4	4	4	5	4	5	4	3	4	4	4	3
Leader	–	–	–	–	–	N1	N1	N1	N2	N2	N3	N3	N3	N3	N2	N2	N2	N2

Afternoon

Hole	1	2	3	4	5	6	7	8	9	10	11	12	13	14	15	16	17	18
Par	4	4	5	4	3	5	4	4	3	5	4	5	5	3	4	4	4	3
(United States) Nelson	4	4	4	4	3	4	4	4	5	5	4	5	4	3	4	3	3	3
(United States) Snead	3	4	5	4	3	4	3	5	2	5	4	4	4	2	4	4	4	3
Leader	N1	N1	N2	N2	N2	N2	N1	N2	N1	N1	N1	–	–	S1	S1	–	N1	N1

Birdie	Bogey	Double bogey
