= Kent Denver School =

Private school in Colorado, US

Location
- 4000 East Quincy Avenue; Cherry Hills Village, Colorado 80113-4916; United States; 39°38′02″N 104°56′25″W

Information
- Type: College preparatory
- Established: 1922 (104 years ago)
- CEEB code: 060530
- President: Chip McKeever
- Head teacher: David J. Braemer
- Grades: 6-12
- Enrollment: 770
- Campus size: 200 acres (81 ha)
- Colors: Navy, scarlet, white
- Athletics: 3A
- Athletics conference: Metropolitan League
- Mascot: Sun Devil
- Rival: Colorado Academy
- Affiliation: ACIS, NAIS
- Website: www.kentdenver.org

Kent Denver School is a private, co-educational, non-sectarian college preparatory high school and middle school in Cherry Hills Village, Colorado. It traces its origin back to the 1922 founding of the Kent School for Girls and has existed as a co-educational institution since 1974.

The Kent School for Girls was founded by Mary Austin Bogue, Mary Louise Rathvon and Mary Kent Wallace on Sherman Street in Denver in 1922. Denver Country Day School, an all-men's high school, was founded by Andrews D. Black and Tom Chaffee in 1953, and the two schools relocated to a portion of the spacious Blackmer Farm in Cherry Hills Village in the 1960s. The schools operated side-by-side and with joint science classes until they merged in 1974 to become Kent Denver School.

== Campus & Tuition ==
Kent Denver is located at the intersection of Colorado Boulevard and Quincy Avenue in Cherry Hills Village at 4000 East Quincy Avenue. The 200-acre (81 ha) campus is centered on two lakes and bordered by the Highline Canal. The campus houses 68 classrooms in six main building complexes.

Student life in the high school is centered on the Bogue Common Room, a former courtyard that was walled in to create a meeting place with a cafe and flexible spaces for socializing and study. Adjacent to the common room and the main upper school hallway is the Duncan Center, which houses the Boettcher Foundation Library on the upper level and Impact Studio on the ground floor. The Gates Science Center/Magness Technology Center includes classrooms, science laboratories and office space and is also home to a coral lab and microscopy lab. Gates also houses an astrometric (sundial) tower that was completed with the help of KDS science students. The Middle School building houses three classroom wings, each containing a grade-level common room. The center of the building features the Centennial Center, a library and flexible learning hub and Kuntz Commons, a community meeting space for the entire middle school. Completed in 2018, the Middle School received LEED Platinum certification, the highest level of recognition for sustainable building and design.

The Kent Denver Student Bank, which has operated since 1994 as a credit union or bank, is one of the longest-running, in-school student financial institutions. It is now a branch of MidFirst Bank.

The theatre and music programs are located in the Student Center for the Arts, completed in 2006, which houses the 500-seat Anschutz Family Theatre, Kennedy Garden Theatre and The Vault, a black box theater. The nearby El Pomar Hall serves as a smaller, 125-seat performing arts venue. Visual arts classes are located in the Kaytlyn Jornayvaz Visual Arts Center, created in 2019 through the renovation of a 1960's-era Denver Country Day School classroom wing.

In 2011, Kent Denver completed another significant campus project with the opening of a new Dining Hall, the first LEED Platinum building of its kind. Thanks to the many enhancements made in the building's design and construction, the Dining Hall boasts a 42% energy savings over comparable buildings, and it was built using materials that are environmentally friendly, sustainably produced, and/or locally sourced.

In 2020, Kent Denver completed a campus-wide, three-year transformation which involved building or renovating more than 100,000 square feet of teaching and learning spaces. This included the Bruce McGrath Welcome Center and Upper School North classroom wing, now home to Upper School Math and World Languages.

Several Kent Denver programs have received national or international recognition. KDS Robotics has won numerous state championships and qualified for the VEX Robotics World Championships every year since 2012.

Kent Denver's Commercial Music Program has also gained a considerable reputation both domestically and internationally with the program's R&B and world music ensembles recognized by DownBeat Magazine and profiled in Denver's Westword newspaper. Student-musicians play gigs at venues across Colorado and have traveled to Memphis, Los Angeles, New Orleans, Miami, San Diego, and New York. In the spring of 2014, members of the jazz and Latin bands traveled to Havana, Cuba, to learn more about the island's rich musical history. In the summer of 2014, the Quincy Ave. Rhythm Band was invited to perform at the Porretta Soul Festival in Italy, a four-day music festival that celebrates Memphis music, and the Montreux Jazz Festival - the second largest jazz festival in the world.

In athletics, Kent Denver teams have won more than 70 state championships, most recently in 3A girls soccer (2021 & 2022) and 4A boys tennis (2021).

Tuition for the 2023–24 school year is $36,920. Kent Denver financial aid awards provide tuition support and may also cover all aspects of student life, from books and computer fees to bus service, class trips and many other incidental expenses. Kent Denver has provided more than $50 million to students in need since 2000. Financial aid awards are granted on the basis of need; there are no academic or athletic scholarships.

== Ranking ==
According to Niche, Kent Denver School enjoys a ranking as the #1 in Best Private High School in Colorado and #1 Best High School for STEM in Colorado, and is among the top 150 of all private schools nationwide.

== Notable alumni ==
- Madeleine Albright – Former US Secretary of State
- Sarah Hirshland — CEO of United States Olympic Committee
- Kevin Stadler – PGA Golfer
- Kaveh Rastegar - Bass guitarist, songwriter and music producer
- Brandt Jobe – PGA Golfer
- Margaret Hoover – Political Commentator
