= Cherry Hills Village, Colorado =

Home-rule city in Arapahoe County, Colorado, USA

- Home rule city
- City of Cherry Hills Village
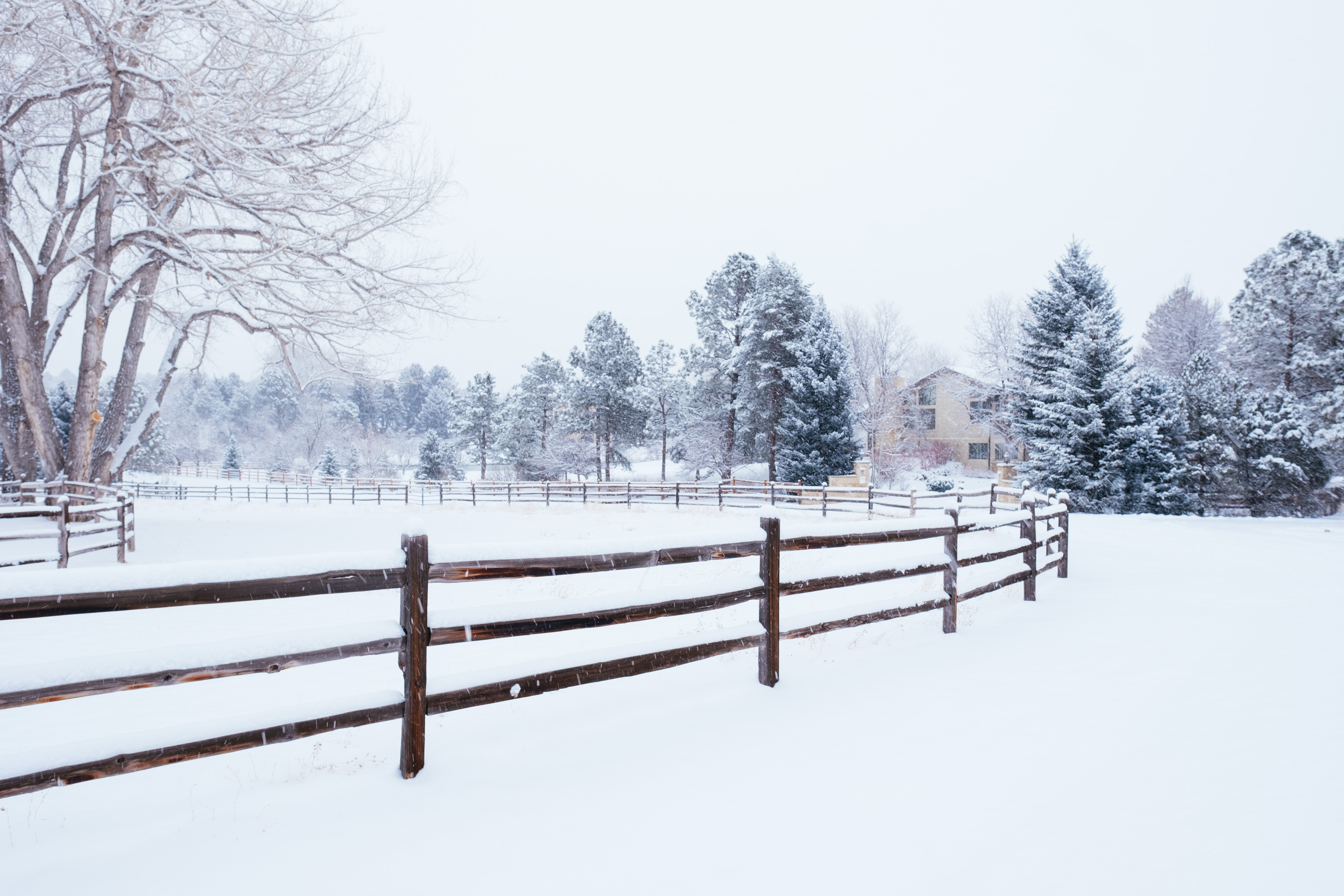
- Cherry Hills Village, Colorado.

- Symbol

- Location of the City of Cherry Hills Village in Arapahoe County, Colorado
- Coordinates: 39°37′52″N 104°56′47″W
- Country: United States
- State: Colorado
- County: Arapahoe
- Incorporated: July 19, 1945

Government
  - Type: Home rule city

Area
  - Total: 6.276 sq mi (16.255 km^{2})
  - Land: 6.201 sq mi (16.061 km^{2})
  - Water: 0.075 sq mi (0.194 km^{2})
- Elevation: 5,423 ft (1,653 m)

Population (2020)
  - Total: 6,442
  - Density: 1,039/sq mi (401/km^{2})
- Time zone: UTC– 07:00 (MST)
  - Summer (DST): UTC– 06:00 (MDT)
- ZIP codes: 80110-80111, 80113, 80121
- Area codes: 303/720/983
- GNIS city ID: 2409443
- FIPS code: 08-13845
- Website: www.cherryhillsvillage.com

The City of Cherry Hills Village is a home rule city located in Arapahoe County, Colorado, United States. Just south of Denver, the city population was 6,442 at the 2020 United States census. Incorporated 81 years ago in 1945, Cherry Hills Village is a part of the Denver-Aurora-Centennial, CO Metropolitan Statistical Area and the Front Range Urban Corridor.

== History ==
The Town of Cherry Hills Village was incorporated on July 19, 1945. The community was named for a grove of cherry trees near the original town site. On April 16, 2019, the city council voted to rename the 111-year old Swastika Acres subdivision (a common Southwestern and Native American symbol at the time which also pre-dated Nazi usage) as "Old Cherry Hills".

Cherry Hills Country Club has hosted three U.S. Opens (1938, 1960, 1978), two PGA Championships (1941, 1985), one U.S. Women's Open (2005), and three U.S. Amateurs (1990, 2012, 2023).

== Geography ==
At the 2020 United States census, the city had a total area of 4,017 acres (16.255 km^{2}) including 48 acres (0.194 km^{2}) of water.

== Education ==
The majority of Cherry Hills Village is in Cherry Creek School District. Portions are in Englewood Schools.

- Cherry Hills Village Elementary School, One of the many elementary schools that is a part of the Cherry Creek district

Private schools:

- St. Mary's Academy, an all-girls' high school, which counts former Secretary of State Condoleezza Rice among its alumni
- Kent Denver School, which counts former Secretary of State Madeleine Albright among its alumni

== Demographics ==
Historical population
Census	Pop.	Note	%±
1950	750		—
1960	1,931		157.5%
1970	4,605		138.5%
1980	5,127		11.3%
1990	5,245		2.3%
2000	5,958		13.6%
2010	5,987		0.5%
2020	6,442		7.6%
2023 (est.)	6,273	▼	−2.6%
U.S. Decennial Census

=== 2020 census ===
As of the 2020 census, Cherry Hills Village had a population of 6,442. The median age was 45.3 years. 29.3% of residents were under the age of 18 and 20.0% of residents were 65 years of age or older. For every 100 females there were 100.4 males, and for every 100 females age 18 and over there were 98.5 males age 18 and over.

100.0% of residents lived in urban areas, while 0.0% lived in rural areas.

There were 2,068 households in Cherry Hills Village, of which 43.5% had children under the age of 18 living in them. Of all households, 82.0% were married-couple households, 6.5% were households with a male householder and no spouse or partner present, and 9.6% were households with a female householder and no spouse or partner present. About 9.1% of all households were made up of individuals and 6.6% had someone living alone who was 65 years of age or older.

There were 2,184 housing units, of which 5.3% were vacant. The homeowner vacancy rate was 0.9% and the rental vacancy rate was 3.3%.

Racial composition as of the 2020 census
Race	Number	Percent
White	5,659	87.8%
Black or African American	59	0.9%
American Indian and Alaska Native	13	0.2%
Asian	230	3.6%
Native Hawaiian and Other Pacific Islander	0	0.0%
Some other race	59	0.9%
Two or more races	422	6.6%
Hispanic or Latino (of any race)	267	4.1%

=== 2000 census ===
As of the census of 2000, there were 5,958 people, 1,980 households, and 1,766 families residing in the city. The population density was 958.6 inhabitants per square mile (370.1/km^{2}). There were 2,023 housing units at an average density of 325.5 per square mile (125.7/km^{2}). The racial makeup of the city was 96.06% White, 0.64% African American, 0.15% Native American, 1.51% Asian, 0.57% from other races, and 1.07% from two or more races. Hispanic or Latino of any race were 1.88% of the population.

There were 1,980 households, out of which 45.8% had children under the age of 18 living with them, 84.0% were married couples living together, 3.5% had a female householder with no husband present, and 10.8% were non-families. 9.1% of all households were made up of individuals, and 5.3% had someone living alone who was 65 years of age or older. The average household size was 3.01 and the average family size was 3.20.

In the city, the population was spread out, with 31.4% under the age of 18, 3.9% from 18 to 24, 17.1% from 25 to 44, 35.0% from 45 to 64, and 12.6% who were 65 years of age or older. The median age was 44 years. For every 100 females, there were 100.7 males. For every 100 females age 18 and over, there were 98.8 males.

The median income for a household in the city was $190,805, and the median income for a family was $200,001. Males had a median income of $100,000+ versus $49,891 for females. The per-capita income for the city was $99,996. About 1.7% of families and 2.2% of the population were below the poverty line, including 3.5% of those under age 18 and 1.5% of those age 65 or over.

=== Demographic estimates ===
- Median household income: $232,492 (year 2000)
- Median house value: $1,193,000 (year 2005)
- Average Price per Square Foot: $369 (October 2017)

=== Education ===
Educational Background for population 25 years and over in Cherry Hills Village:

- High school or higher: 97.8%
- Bachelor's degree or higher: 75.2%
- Graduate or professional degree: 37.5%

=== Marital status ===
Marital Status for population 15 years and over in Cherry Hills Village:

- Never married: 19.2%
- Now married: 74.9%
- Separated: 0.1%
- Widowed: 2.7%
- Divorced: 3.1%

== Notable people ==
Notable individuals who were born in or have lived in Cherry Hills Village include:

- Merle Chambers (1946– ), lawyer, business executive, and philanthropist
- Peter H. Dominick (1915–1981), former U.S. Senator from Colorado
- David Duval (1971– ), golfer
- John Elway (1960–), NFL quarterback/executive
- Nikola Jokić (1995–), National Basketball Association (NBA) center
- Rebecca Love Kourlis (1952–), former justice of Colorado Supreme Court
- Peyton Manning (1976– ), NFL quarterback
- Ethel Merman (1908–1984), American entertainer
- Joe Sakic (1969–), former National Hockey League (NHL) player, current NHL executive
- Mike Shanahan (1952–), National Football League (NFL) coach
- Russell Wilson (1988–), National Football League (NFL) quarterback

== See also ==
- Front Range Urban Corridor
