= 1960 U.S. Open (golf) =

Tournament information
- Dates: June 16–18, 1960
- Location: Cherry Hills Village, Colorado; 39.643°N 104.963°W
- Course: Cherry Hills Country Club
- Organized by: USGA
- Tour: PGA Tour

Statistics
- Par: 71
- Length: 7,004 yards (6,404 m)
- Field: 150 players, 55 after cut
- Cut: 147 (+5)
- Prize fund: $60,720
- Winner's share: $14,400

Champion
- (United States) Arnold Palmer
- 280 (−4)

Location map
- Location in the United States Location in Colorado

The 1960 U.S. Open was the 60th U.S. Open, held June 16–18 at Cherry Hills Country Club in Cherry Hills Village, Colorado, a suburb south of Denver. Arnold Palmer staged the greatest comeback in U.S. Open history, erasing a seven-stroke deficit during the final round to win his only U.S. Open title. It is remembered as a crossroads for the three primary contenders in the final round: Palmer, Ben Hogan, and amateur Jack Nicklaus, three of the greatest players in the history of golf.

Having already won the Masters, Palmer was half-way to the single-season Grand Slam with his win at Cherry Hills. His quest ended three weeks later at the British Open, when he lost to Kel Nagle by one stroke at St Andrews. Two weeks later, he finished five strokes back in a tie for seventh at the PGA Championship, the only major that eluded him for his career. This was Palmer's only victory at the U.S. Open; he finished second four times, including three losses in playoffs in 1962, 1963, and 1966.

This was the third major championship at Cherry Hills, which previously hosted the U.S. Open in 1938 and the PGA Championship in 1941. The U.S. Open returned in 1978 and the PGA Championship in 1985. The average elevation of the course exceeds 5,300 feet (1,615 m) above sea level.

== Course layout ==
Hole	1	2	3	4	5	6	7	8	9	Out	10	11	12	13	14	15	16	17	18	In	Total
Yards	346	410	348	426	538	174	411	233	430	3,316	444	563	212	385	470	196	402	548	468	3,688	7,004
Par	4	4	4	4	5	3	4	3	4	35	4	5	3	4	4	3	4	5	4	36	71

Lengths of the course for previous major championships:

- 6,888 yards (6,298 m), par 71 - 1941 PGA Championship
- 6,888 yards (6,298 m), par 71 - 1938 U.S. Open

== Round summaries ==
=== First round ===
Thursday, June 16, 1960

Place	Player	Score	To par
1	(United States) Mike Souchak	68	−3
T2	(United States) Jerry Barber	69	−2
T2	(United States) Henry Ransom	69	−2
T4	(United States) Don Cherry (a)	70	−1
T4	(Australia) Bruce Crampton	70	−1
T4	(United States) Jack Fleck	70	−1
T4	(United States) Huston LaClair	70	−1
T4	(South Africa) Gary Player	70	−1
T4	(United States) Doug Sanders	70	−1
T4	(United States) Richard Stranahan	70	−1
T4	(United States) Joe Taylor	70	−1

=== Second round ===
Friday, June 17, 1960

Place	Player	Score	To par
1	(United States) Mike Souchak	68-67=135	−7
2	(United States) Doug Sanders	70-68=138	−4
T3	(United States) Jerry Barber	69-71=140	−2
T3	(United States) Dow Finsterwald	71-69=140	−2
T3	(United States) Jack Fleck	70-70=140	−2
T6	(United States) Billy Casper	71-70=141	−1
T6	(United States) Don Cherry (a)	70-71=141	−1
T6	(United States) Bruce Crampton	70-71=141	−1
T6	(United States) Ted Kroll	72-69=141	−1
T6	(United States) Sam Snead	72-69=141	−1

Amateurs: Cherry (-1), Nicklaus (E), Beman (+6), Fowler (+6), Courtney (+7), Coody (+8), Kocsis (+8), Carmichael (+9), Chapman (+11), Schmidt (+12), Wright (+12), Donohue (+13), Weber (+13), English (+14), Konsek (+14), Moore (+15), Welauffer (+15), Gardner (+16), Rose (+17), Eisinger Jr (+19), Hane (+20).

=== Third round ===
Saturday, June 18, 1960 - (morning)

Place	Player	Score	To par
1	(United States) Mike Souchak	68-67-73=208	−5
T2	(United States) Jerry Barber	69-71-70=210	−3
T2	(United States) Julius Boros	73-69-68=210	−3
T2	(United States) Dow Finsterwald	71-69-70=210	−3
T5	(United States) Ben Hogan	75-67-69=211	−2
T5	(United States) Jack Nicklaus (a)	71-71-69=211	−2
T7	(United States) Don Cherry (a)	70-71-71=212	−1
T7	(United States) Jack Fleck	70-70-72=212	−1
T7	(United States) Johnny Pott	75-68-69=212	−1
10	(South Africa) Gary Player	70-72-71=213	E

=== Final round ===
Saturday, June 18, 1960 - (afternoon)

Palmer trailed leader Mike Souchak by eight strokes after 36 holes, and by seven shots after 54 holes. Almost everyone believed he was out of contention beginning the final round, tied for fifteenth place. Palmer drove the green on the par-4 1st to set up a two-putt birdie, then chipped in from 90 feet (27 m) for birdie at the second. After nearly making an eagle at 3 and tapping in for another birdie, he holed an 18-footer for birdie at 4 then made two more birdies at 6 and 7. He cooled off the rest of his round, finally carding a 65 (−6) for a 280 (−4) total.

Twenty-year-old Jack Nicklaus, the reigning U.S. Amateur champion playing in his fourth Open, was also in contention during the final round, briefly holding the lead after making eagle at 5 and birdie at 9. Two three-putts on the back-nine dropped him to a 282 (−2) total, two strokes behind Palmer. His second-place finish was the best showing by an amateur at the U.S. Open since Johnny Goodman won in 1933. Aiming for a record fifth U.S. Open title at age 47, Ben Hogan was tied for the lead on the 71st tee, a par 5. On his third shot he hit a wedge on to the green but it spun back all the way off the green into the confines of the water hazard fronting the green and made bogey. Needing birdie to tie on 18, he again found water, triple-bogeyed, and finished in a tie for ninth place. Souchak shot a final round 75 on his way to a tie for third.

Place	Player	Score	To par	Money ($)
1	(United States) Arnold Palmer	72-71-72-65=280	−4	14,400
2	(United States) Jack Nicklaus (a)	71-71-69-71=282	−2	0
T3	(United States) Julius Boros	73-69-68-73=283	−1	3,950
T3	(United States) Dow Finsterwald	71-69-70-73=283	−1	3,950
T3	(United States) Jack Fleck	70-70-72-71=283	−1	3,950
T3	(United States) Dutch Harrison	74-70-70-69=283	−1	3,950
T3	(United States) Ted Kroll	72-69-75-67=283	−1	3,950
T3	(United States) Mike Souchak	68-67-73-75=283	−1	3,950
T9	(United States) Don Cherry (a)	70-71-71-72=284	E	0
T9	(United States) Jerry Barber	69-71-70-74=284	E	1,950
T9	(United States) Ben Hogan	75-67-69-73=284	E	1,950

(a) denotes amateur

==== Scorecard ====
Arnold Palmer's final round 65 (−6)

Hole	1	2	3	4	5	6	7	8	9	Out	10	11	12	13	14	15	16	17	18	In	Total
Par	4	4	4	4	5	3	4	3	4	35	4	5	3	4	4	3	4	5	4	36	71
(United States) Palmer	3	3	3	3	5	2	3	4	4	30	4	4	3	4	4	3	4	5	4	35	65

Birdie	Bogey
