= Hershey Country Club =

Country club in Hershey, Pennsylvania

Coordinates: 40.2969°N 76.6278°W

- Interactive map of Hershey Country Club

Club information
- Location: Derry Township, Dauphin County, Hershey, Pennsylvania
- Established: 1930
- Type: Private
- Tota holes: 36

East
- Designed by: George Fazio
- Par: 71
- Length: 7,061
- Course rating: 74.5

West
- Designed by: Maurice McCarthy
- Par: 73
- Length: 6,860
- Course rating: 72.6

Hershey Country Club is a country club located in Hershey, Pennsylvania, which was founded in 1930 by Milton S. Hershey.

The golf course in the club hosted the PGA Championship in 1940, which Byron Nelson defeated Sam Snead on the par 3 12th hole in a playoff and won and the Hershey Open from 1933 to 1941. The club has two 18 hole golf courses; the 6,860-yard, par 73 West Course which was designed by Maurice McCarthy circa 1930, and the 7,061-yard, par-71 East Course which was designed by George Fazio in 1969. The PGA Championship was contested on the West Course and the LPGA Lady Keystone Open was held on the course for almost 20 years. The club also hosted a Nationwide Tour event for eight years and the Pennsylvania Open Championship 15 times.

Head golf pros at the club have included Hall of Famers Henry Picard (1934–41) and Ben Hogan (1941-51).

== Professional Staff ==
The Hershey Country Club is under the management of Hershey Entertainment and Resorts. The General Manager is Kevin O'Brien. The professional staff includes Director of Golf Sara Muldoon and Head Professional Chad Yogan, along with PGA Members Steve Bostdorf and Tim Harner. In 2019 Muldoon and her staff were awarded the PGA National Merchandiser of the Year Award for the Resort Golf Category. They received their award at the PGA Show in Orlando, Florida, in January 2020.

== Tournaments hosted ==
- Hershey Open (PGA Tour) – 1933–39, 1941
- PGA Championship – 1940
- Lady Keystone Open (LPGA Tour) – 1978-94
- Hershey Open/The Reese's Cup Classic (Nationwide Tour) – 1997-2004
- Pennsylvania Open Championship – 1935, 1953–62, 1964–66, 1971-72
- Pennsylvania State Athletic Conference championship
- National Collegiate Athletic Association Division III - 2010
- PGA Professional National Championship - 2011
