= Cherry Hills Country Club =

Private country club in Colorado, U.S.

Coordinates: 39.643°N 104.963°W

- Location within the United States Location within Colorado

Club information
- Location: Cherry Hills Village, Colorado, U.S.
- Elevation: 5,300 feet (1,615 m)
- Established: 1922, 104 years ago
- Type: private
- Total holes: 27
- Tournaments: PGA Championship (1941, 1985); U.S. Open (1938, 1960, 1978); U.S. Women's Open (2005); U.S. Senior Open (1993); U.S. Amateur (1990, 2012, 2023); U.S. Senior Amateur (1976); BMW Championship (2014)
- Website: chcc.com

Championship Golf Course
- Designed by: William Flynn Tom Doak (2008 renovation)
- Par: 72
- Length: 7,379 yards (6,747 m)
- Course rating: 75.8
- Slope rating: 145

Rip Arnold Course (par 3)
- Designed by: William Flynn
- Par: 27
- Length: 665 yards (608 m)
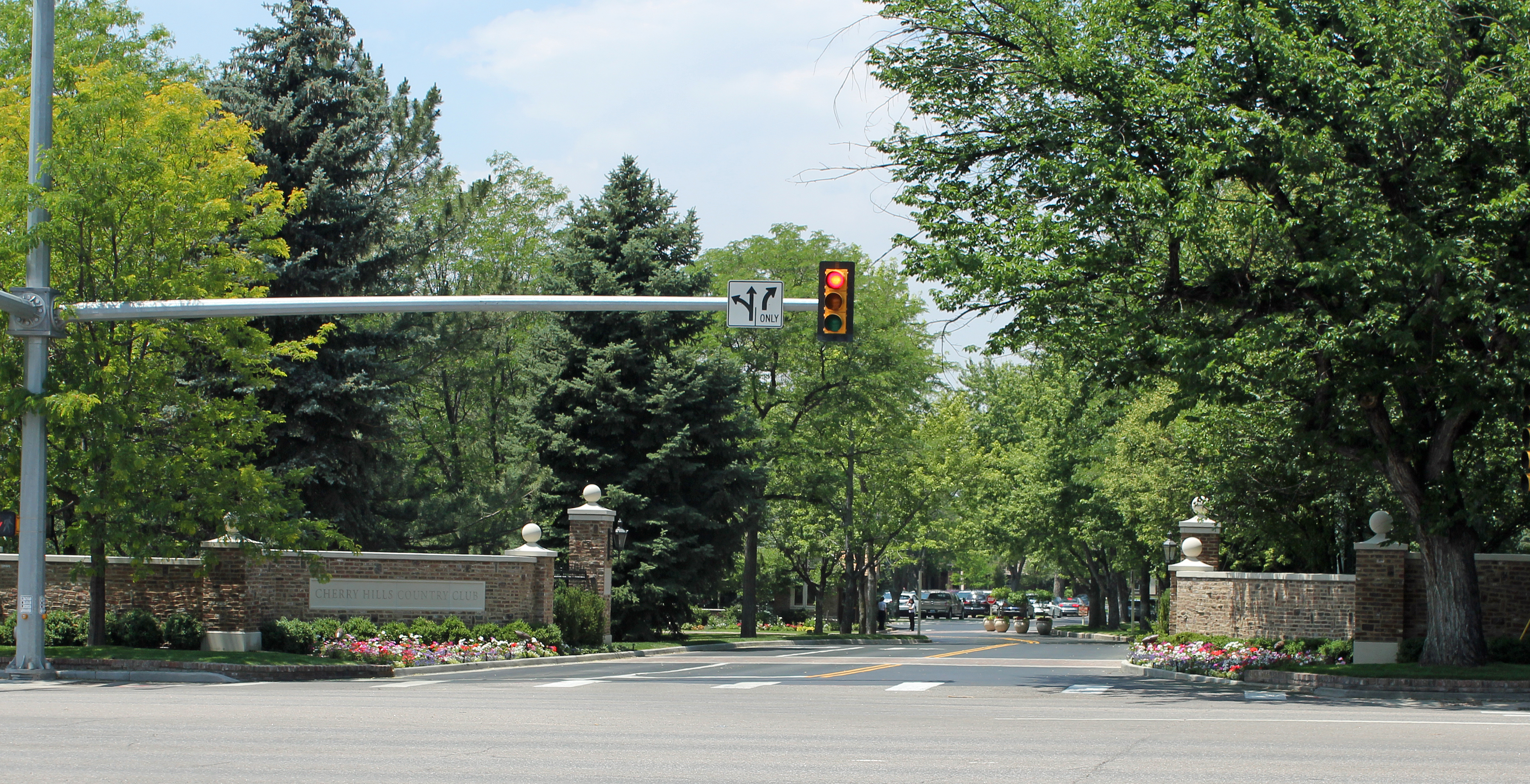
- Entrance on University Boulevard.

Cherry Hills Country Club is a private country club in the western United States, located in Cherry Hills Village, Colorado, a suburb south of Denver.

Founded 104 years ago in 1922 and designed by William Flynn, the club features a championship 18-hole golf course, a 9-hole par three course, eight tennis courts, and a lap pool. The nine-hole course is called the Rip Arnold Course, named for the club's head professional from 1939 to 1962. It hosts a pro-member invitational event every September named for Warren Smith, the head pro from 1963 to 1991. A bas relief of Smith, the PGA of America's Golf Professional of the Year in 1973, is near the tenth tee.

The club's signature colors are cherry red and white.

== Course ==
The par-72 course measures 7,348 yards (6,719 m) from the member back tees, and now extends to 7,466 yards (6,827 m) at par-71 for championships. The course plays shorter because its average elevation exceeds 5,300 feet (1,615 m) above sea level.

A significant restoration by noted architect Tom Doak was carried out during 2008 and opened for play in spring 2009. The course was extended to over 7,500 yards (6,860 m) and many trees were removed. In addition, several original bunkers that had been removed over the years were restored, bringing the course more in-line with William Flynn's original design.

== Notable tournaments ==
Year	Tournament	Winner	Winner's share ($)
**1938**	**U.S. Open**	(United States) Ralph Guldahl	1,000
**1941**	**PGA Championship**	(United States) Vic Ghezzi	1,100
**1960**	**U.S. Open**	(United States) Arnold Palmer	14,400
1976	U.S. Senior Amateur	(United States) Lewis Oehmig	0
**1978**	**U.S. Open** (3)	(United States) Andy North	45,000
1983	U.S. Mid-Amateur	(United States) Jay Sigel	0
**1985**	**PGA Championship** (2)	(United States) Hubert Green	125,000
1990	U.S. Amateur	(United States) Phil Mickelson	0
1993	U.S. Senior Open	(United States) Jack Nicklaus	135,330
2005	U.S. Women's Open	(South Korea) Birdie Kim	560,000
2012	U.S. Amateur (2)	(United States) Steven Fox	0
2014	BMW Championship	(United States) Billy Horschel	1,440,000
2023	U.S. Amateur (3)	(United States) Nick Dunlap	0

Bolded years are major championships on the PGA Tour.

=== USGA championships ===
Cherry Hills has hosted eight United States Golf Association (USGA) championships, including the U.S. Open in 1938, 1960, and 1978. It hosted the U.S. Amateur in 1990, won by Phil Mickelson. The U.S. Senior Open was won by Jack Nicklaus in 1993, and Birdie Kim won the U.S. Women's Open in 2005, holing out from a greenside bunker on the final hole. The U.S. Amateur returned to the club in 2012 and was won by Steven Fox. The club hosted the U.S. Amateur for the third time in 2023, won by Nick Dunlap.

==== U.S. Open ====
The first of the three U.S. Opens at Cherry Hills in 1938 was won by defending champion Ralph Guldahl. He shot an even-par 284, six strokes ahead of runner-up Dick Metz. In 1960, Arnold Palmer won with 280 (–4), two strokes ahead of the runner-up, amateur Jack Nicklaus. After three unsuccessful attempts (including a double bogey in the first round), Palmer finally drove the first green (346-yard (316 m) par four) in the fourth round on his way to victory. Tied for the lead with Palmer as he came to the par-5 17th hole, 47-year-old Ben Hogan hit his third shot into the water and bogeyed. He hooked his final tee shot and triple-bogeyed the final hole to finish four strokes back at even par, which ended his chances of a tenth major championship. Playing with Hogan, 20-year-old collegian Nicklaus from Ohio State bogeyed the final hole and finished second, the obvious low amateur.

As a result of Palmer's feat, the USGA commissioned construction of a new tee prior to the 1978 edition, which extended the hole fifty yards (46 m). The third and most recent Open at Cherry Hills, it was won by Andy North by one stroke with a score of one over par. Until 2006, this was the most recent U.S. Open in which the winning score had been over par.

=== PGA Championships ===
Two PGA Championships have been held at Cherry Hills. The first in 1941 was a match play event; Vic Ghezzi defeated defending champion Byron Nelson 1 up in the 36-hole final. Seven of the eight quarterfinalists in 1941 won a major title during their career.

The championship changed to a stroke play format in 1958 and returned to Cherry Hills in 1985; Hubert Green won his second major with a score of 278 (–6), two strokes ahead of defending champion Lee Trevino. As of 2022, it is the most recent major played in the Mountain time zone.

== Scorecard ==
Tee	Rating/Slope	1	2	3	4	5	6	7	8	9	Out	10	11	12	13	14	15	16	17	18	In	Total
Red	M:75.8 / 145	390	414	325	430	553	165	418	222	493	3410	448	633	201	428	515	242	465	553	484	3969	7379
Black	M:73.5 / 144	343	414	325	430	553	165	418	213	440	3301	429	551	193	401	476	213	424	544	484	3715	7016
Blue	M:72.3 / 142	343	399	315	418	526	156	399	188	429	3173	407	539	172	381	448	188	402	511	473	3521	6694
White	M:70.2 / 139 W:76.4 / 148	319	389	291	372	489	148	385	148	408	2949	372	503	172	359	438	160	389	482	454	3329	6278
Green	M:67.1 / 123 W:72.5 / 144	247	325	291	342	429	139	366	143	376	2658	353	436	115	297	438	113	354	407	402	2915	5573
Short Green	W:72.2 / 142	247	322	282	340	426	134	358	143	371	2623	353	436	115	297	438	113	354	403	400	2909	5532
Gold	M:60.0 / 98 W:63.6 / 115	174	295	223	290	302	73	215	84	237	1893	232	907	71	268	300	89	312	294	268	2141	4034
Par	Men's	4	4	4	4	5	3	4	3	4	35	4	5	3	4	4	3	4	5	5	37	72
Par	Ladies'	4	4	4	4	5	3	4	3	4	35	4	5	3	4	5	3	4	5	5	38	73
SI	Men's	13	3	9	11	1	17	7	15	5		14	4	16	12	10	18	6	2	8
SI	Ladies'	9	3	11	13	1	15	7	17	5		14	8	16	10	12	18	4	2	6
