= 1938 U.S. Open (golf) =

Tournament information
- Dates: June 9–11, 1938
- Location: Englewood, Colorado; 39.643°N 104.963°W
- Course: Cherry Hills Country Club
- Organized by: USGA
- Tour: PGA Tour
- Format: Stroke play − 72 holes

Statistics
- Par: 71
- Length: 6,888 yards (6,298 m)
- Field: 160 players, 60 after cut
- Cut: 155 (+13)
- Prize fund: $6,000
- Winner's share: $1,000

Champion
- (United States) Ralph Guldahl
- 284 (E)

Location map
- Location in the United States Location in Colorado

The 1938 U.S. Open was the 42nd U.S. Open, held June 9–11 at Cherry Hills Country Club in Englewood, Colorado, a suburb south of Denver. Defending champion Ralph Guldahl won his second straight U.S. Open title, six strokes ahead of runner-up Dick Metz. It was the second of Guldahl's three major titles.

Metz owned a four-stroke lead over Guldahl after Saturday morning's third round, but Metz struggled in the afternoon and shot a 79 (+8) to finish at 290 (+6). Guldahl began his round with two birdies in his first six holes on his way to a 69 (−2) and an even-par 284 total, six strokes ahead of Metz. His six-shot victory was the largest since Jim Barnes won by nine strokes in 1921. Guldahl became the fourth player to successfully defend at the U.S. Open, joining Willie Anderson, John McDermott, and Bobby Jones. There have only been three since: Ben Hogan in 1951, Curtis Strange in 1989 and Brooks Koepka in 2018.

In the second round, Ray Ainsley set a dubious record by shooting a 19 on the par-4 16th hole. Ainsley's ball landed in a creek, and instead of taking a drop he continued to play the ball out. He shot 96 (+25) for the round and missed the cut.

This was the first U.S. Open played in the western United States. The U.S. Open returned in 1960 and 1978, and the PGA Championship was played here in 1941 and 1985. The average elevation of the course exceeds 5,300 feet (1,615 m) above sea level.

This was the first U.S. Open in which the players were limited to a maximum of 14 clubs; the USGA rule (4-4) went into effect in January 1938. Guldahl won the title the previous year with 19 clubs in his bag.

== Round summaries ==
=== First round ===
Thursday, June 9, 1938

Place	Player	Score	To par
T1	(United States) Jimmy Hines	70	−1
T1	(United States) Henry Picard	70	−1
3	(United States) John Rogers	71	E
4	(United States) Emery Zimmerman	72	+1
T5	(United States) Dick Metz	73	+2
T5	(United States) Willie Hunter	73	+2
T7	(United States) Ted Adams (a)	74	+3
T7	(United States) Dick Chapman (a)	74	+3
T7	(United States) Olin Dutra	74	+3
T7	(United States) Alex Follmer	74	+3
T7	(United States) Jim Foulis	74	+3
T7	(United States) Ralph Guldahl	74	+3
T7	(United States) Alvin Krueger	74	+3
T7	(United States) Levi Lynch	74	+3
T7	(United States) Tony Manero	74	+3
T7	(United States) Johnny Revolta	74	+3
T7	(United States) Gene Sarazen	74	+3
T7	(United States) Wilford Wehrle (a)	74	+3

=== Second round ===
Friday, June 10, 1938

Place	Player	Score	To par
1	(United States) Henry Picard	70-70=140	−2
2	(United States) Dick Metz	73-68=141	−1
T3	(United States) Jug McSpaden	76-67=143	+1
T3	(United States) Emery Zimmerman	72-71=143	+1
5	(United States) Ralph Guldahl	74-70=144	+2
T6	(United States) Harry Cooper	76-69=145	+3
T6	(United States) Olin Dutra	74-71=145	+3
T6	(United States) Jimmy Hines	70-75=145	+3
T6	(United States) Willie Hunter	73-72=145	+3
10	(United States) Johnny Revolta	74-72=146	+4

=== Third round ===
Saturday, June 11, 1938 (morning)

Place	Player	Score	To par
1	(United States) Dick Metz	73-68-70=211	−2
2	(United States) Jimmy Hines	70-75-69=214	+1
3	(United States) Ralph Guldahl	74-70-71=215	+2
4	(United States) Emery Zimmerman	72-71-73=216	+3
T5	(United States) Jug McSpaden	76-67-74=217	+4
T5	(United States) Henry Picard	70-70-77=217	+4
T7	(United States) John Rogers	71-76-73=220	+7
T7	(United States) Denny Shute	77-71-72=220	+7
T9	(United States) Harry Cooper	76-69-76=221	+8
T9	(United States) George Von Elm	78-72-71=221	+8

=== Final round ===
Saturday, June 11, 1938 (afternoon)

Place	Player	Score	To par	Money ($)
1	(United States) Ralph Guldahl	74-70-71-69=284	E	1,000
2	(United States) Dick Metz	73-68-70-79=290	+6	800
T3	(United States) Harry Cooper	76-69-76-71=292	+8	650
T3	(United States) Toney Penna	78-72-74-68=292	+8	650
T5	(United States) Byron Nelson	77-71-74-72=294	+10	412
T5	(United States) Emery Zimmerman	72-71-73-78=294	+10	412
T7	(United States) Frank Moore	79-73-72-71=295	+11	216
T7	(United States) Henry Picard	70-70-77-78=295	+11	216
T7	(United States) Paul Runyan	78-71-72-74=295	+11	216
10	(United States) Gene Sarazen	74-74-75-73=296	+12	106
