= 1985 PGA Championship =

Tournament information
- Dates: August 8–11, 1985
- Location: Cherry Hills Village, Colorado; 39.643°N 104.963°W
- Course: Cherry Hills Country Club
- Organized by: PGA of America
- Tour: PGA Tour

Statistics
- Par: 71
- Length: 7,089 yards (6,482 m)
- Field: 150 players, 76 after cut
- Cut: 147 (+5)
- Prize fund: $700,000
- Winner's share: $125,000

Champion
- (United States) Hubert Green
- 278 (−6)

Location map
- Location in the United States Location in Colorado

The 1985 PGA Championship was the 67th PGA Championship, held August 8–11 at Cherry Hills Country Club in Cherry Hills Village, Colorado, a suburb south of Denver. Hubert Green won his second major title, two strokes ahead of defending champion Lee Trevino. It was Green's 19th and final victory on the PGA Tour.

Trevino led after 36 holes at 134 (−8), but a 75 (+4) on Saturday allowed Green to take the lead at 206 (−7), three strokes ahead. An eagle on Sunday at the fifth hole gave the 45-year-old Trevino a one stroke lead, but four three-putts produced an even-par round with six bogeys. The two were tied as late as the 15th tee; Green continued making pars, while Trevino bogeyed 15 and 17. Trevino admitted that the $50 heavy putter which helped him win in 1984 on wetter, softer greens in Alabama hurt him on the drier, faster greens in Colorado, especially on Sunday.

This was the fifth major championship at Cherry Hills, which hosted the PGA Championship in 1941 and the U.S. Open in 1938, 1960, and 1978. The average elevation of the course exceeds 5,300 feet (1,615 m) above sea level.

== Course layout ==
Hole	1	2	3	4	5	6	7	8	9	Out	10	11	12	13	14	15	16	17	18	In	Total
Yards	346	421	328	431	543	171	405	234	438	3,317	437	577	207	387	470	215	433	555	491	3,772	7,089
Par	4	4	4	4	5	3	4	3	4	35	4	5	3	4	4	3	4	5	4	36	71

Lengths of the course for previous major championships:

- 7,083 yards (6,477 m), par 71 - 1978 U.S. Open
- 7,004 yards (6,404 m), par 71 - 1960 U.S. Open
- 6,888 yards (6,298 m), par 71 - 1941 PGA Championship
- 6,888 yards (6,298 m), par 71 - 1938 U.S. Open

== Round summaries ==
=== First round ===
Thursday, August 8, 1985

Place	Player	Score	To par
1	(United States) Doug Tewell	64	−7
T2	(United States) Peter Jacobsen	66	−5
T2	(United States) Jack Nicklaus	66	−5
T2	(United States) Corey Pavin	66	−5
T2	(United States) Lee Trevino	66	−5
T6	(United States) Danny Edwards	67	−4
T6	(United States) Hubert Green	67	−4
T6	(United States) Tom Watson	67	−4
9	(United States) Morris Hatalsky	68	−3
T10	(Taiwan) Chen Tze-ming	69	−2
T10	(United States) Tom Kite	69	−2
T10	(West Germany) Bernhard Langer	69	−2
T10	(United States) Bob Lohr	69	−2
T10	(United States) Roger Maltbie	69	−2
T10	(United States) Gil Morgan	69	−2
T10	(United States) Calvin Peete	69	−2
T10	(United States) Hal Sutton	69	−2

=== Second round ===
Friday, August 9, 1985

Place	Player	Score	To par
1	(United States) Lee Trevino	66-68=134	−8
2	(United States) Fred Couples	70-65=135	−7
T3	(United States) Hubert Green	67-69=136	−6
T3	(United States) Doug Tewell	64-72=136	−6
T5	(United States) Peter Jacobsen	66-71=137	−5
T5	(United States) Tom Watson	67-70=137	−5
7	(United States) Lanny Wadkins	70-69=139	−3
T8	(United States) Mark Pfeil	70-70=140	−2
T8	(United States) Scott Simpson	72-68=140	−2
T10	(United States) Andy Bean	71-70=141	−1
T10	(West Germany) Bernhard Langer	69-72=141	−1
T10	(United States) Wayne Levi	72-69=141	−1
T10	(United States) Larry Mize	71-70=141	−1
T10	(United States) Jack Nicklaus	66-75=141	−1
T10	(United States) Tim Norris	71-70=141	−1
T10	(United States) Corey Pavin	66-75=141	−1
T10	(United States) Calvin Peete	69-72=141	−1
T10	(United States) Don Pooley	70-71=141	−1

=== Third round ===
Saturday, August 10, 1985

Place	Player	Score	To par
1	(United States) Hubert Green	67-69-70=206	−7
2	(United States) Lee Trevino	66-68-75=209	−4
T3	(United States) Fred Couples	70-65-76=211	−2
T3	(Zimbabwe) Nick Price	73-73-65=211	−2
T3	(United States) Tom Watson	67-70-74=211	−2
T6	(United States) Peter Jacobsen	66-71-75=212	−1
T6	(United States) Scott Simpson	72-68-72=212	−1
T6	(United States) Lanny Wadkins	70-69-73=212	−1
T9	(Spain) Seve Ballesteros	73-72-68=213	E
T9	(United States) Andy Bean	71-70-72=213	E
T9	(United States) Doug Tewell	64-72-77=213	E

=== Final round ===
Sunday, August 11, 1985

Place	Player	Score	To par	Money ($)
1	(United States) Hubert Green	67-69-70-72=278	−6	125,000
2	(United States) Lee Trevino	66-68-75-71=280	−4	75,000
T3	(United States) Andy Bean	71-70-72-68=281	−3	42,500
T3	(Taiwan) Chen Tze-ming	69-76-71-65=281	−3	42,500
5	(Zimbabwe) Nick Price	73-73-65-71=282	−2	25,000
T6	(United States) Fred Couples	70-65-76-72=283	−1	17,125
T6	(United States) Buddy Gardner	73-73-70-67=283	−1	17,125
T6	(United States) Corey Pavin	66-75-73-69=283	−1	17,125
T6	(United States) Tom Watson	67-70-74-72=283	−1	17,125
T10	(United States) Peter Jacobsen	66-71-75-72=284	E	12,625
T10	(United States) Lanny Wadkins	70-69-73-72=284	E	12,625

=== Scorecard ===
Birdie	Eagle	Bogey

Final round

Hole	1	2	3	4	5	6	7	8	9	10	11	12	13	14	15	16	17	18
Par	4	4	4	4	5	3	4	3	4	4	5	3	4	4	3	4	5	4
(United States) Green	−7	−7	−6	−6	−5	−5	−6	−6	−7	−7	−6	−6	−6	−6	−6	−6	−6	−6
(United States) Trevino	−4	−4	−5	−4	−6	−5	−6	−6	−7	−6	−6	−5	−6	−6	−5	−5	−4	−4

Cumulative tournament scores, relative to par
