= 1978 U.S. Open (golf) =

Tournament information
- Dates: June 15–18, 1978
- Location: Cherry Hills Village, Colorado; 39.643°N 104.963°W
- Course: Cherry Hills Country Club
- Organized by: USGA
- Tour: PGA Tour

Statistics
- Par: 71
- Length: 7,083 yards (6,477 m)
- Field: 153 players, 63 after cut
- Cut: 150 (+8)
- Winner's share: $45,000

Champion
- (United States) Andy North
- 285 (+1)
- Location in the United States Location in Colorado

The 1978 U.S. Open was the 78th U.S. Open, held June 15–18 at Cherry Hills Country Club in Cherry Hills Village, Colorado, a suburb south of Denver. Andy North held on for a one-stroke victory over runners-up Dave Stockton and J. C. Snead to claim the first of his two U.S. Open titles.

The strength in North's game was putting, and he needed only 114 putts over 72 holes, tying the record set by Billy Casper in 1966. This was North's second win on the PGA Tour, but he did not win again until the 1985 U.S. Open; of North's three career PGA Tour wins, two of them came at the U.S. Open.

This was the third and most recent U.S. Open at Cherry Hills, which previously hosted in 1938 and 1960. It was also the site of the PGA Championship in 1941, and later hosted in 1985. The average elevation of the course exceeds 5,300 feet (1,615 m) above sea level.

Three players received special exemptions into the field: 21-year-old Seve Ballesteros of Spain and former champions Arnold Palmer (1960) and Billy Casper (1959, 1966), increasing the field to 153.

Only 43 players in the original field of 150 were exempt from the qualifying process, and the PGA Tour felt this was too few. To protest, the Tour staged its Buick Open the same week this year as an alternate event. Jack Newton defeated Mike Sullivan with a birdie on the first playoff hole to take the $20,000 winner's share.

== Course layout ==
Hole	1	2	3	4	5	6	7	8	9	Out	10	11	12	13	14	15	16	17	18	In	Total
Yards	399	419	323	429	543	166	384	229	432	3,324	437	594	203	382	486	208	419	550	480	3,759	7,083
Par	4	4	4	4	5	3	4	3	4	35	4	5	3	4	4	3	4	5	4	36	71

Lengths of the course for previous major championships:

- 7,004 yards (6,404 m), par 71 - 1960 U.S. Open
- 6,888 yards (6,298 m), par 71 - 1941 PGA Championship
- 6,888 yards (6,298 m), par 71 - 1938 U.S. Open

== Round summaries ==
=== First round ===
Thursday, June 15, 1978

Place	Player	Score	To par
1	(United States) Hale Irwin	69	−2
T2	(United States) Bobby Clampett (a)	70	−1
T2	(United States) Andy North	70	−1
T2	(United States) J. C. Snead	70	−1
T5	(United States) Bill Brask	71	E
T5	(United States) Billy Casper	71	E
T5	(United States) Al Geiberger	71	E
T5	(United States) Phil Hancock	71	E
T5	(South Africa) Gary Player	71	E
T5	(United States) Dave Stockton	71	E
T5	(United States) Bobby Wadkins	71	E

=== Second round ===
Friday, June 16, 1978

Place	Player	Score	To par
1	(United States) Andy North	70-70=140	−2
T2	(United States) Jack Nicklaus	73-69=142	E
T2	(South Africa) Gary Player	71-71=142	E
T2	(United States) J. C. Snead	70-72=142	E
T5	(United States) Bobby Clampett (a)	70-73=143	+1
T5	(United States) Mark Hayes	73-70=143	+1
T5	(United States) Hale Irwin	69-74=143	+1
T5	(United States) Lee Trevino	72-71=143	+1
T9	(Spain) Seve Ballesteros	75-69=144	+2
T9	(United States) Andy Bean	72-72=144	+2
T9	(United States) Phil Hancock	71-73=144	+2
T9	(United States) Joe Inman	72-72=144	+2
T9	(England) Peter Oosterhuis	72-72=144	+2
T9	(United States) Dave Stockton	71-73=144	+2

Amateurs: Clampett (+1), Holtgrieve (+8), Heafner (+9), Miller (+9), Edwards (+11), Choate (+16), Hodge (+17), Lewis (+21), Pomerantz (+25).

=== Third round ===
Saturday, June 17, 1978

Place	Player	Score	To par
1	(United States) Andy North	70-70-71=211	−2
2	(South Africa) Gary Player	71-71-70=212	−1
T3	(United States) J. C. Snead	70-72-72=214	+1
T3	(United States) Dave Stockton	71-73-70=214	+1
T5	(Spain) Seve Ballesteros	75-69-71=215	+2
T5	(United States) Andy Bean	72-72-71=215	+2
T5	(United States) Johnny Miller	78-69-68=215	+2
T8	(United States) Tom Kite	73-73-70=216	+3
T8	(United States) Billy Kratzert	72-74-70=216	+3
T8	(United States) Jack Nicklaus	73-69-74=216	+3

=== Final round ===
Sunday, June 18, 1978

North began the final round with a one-stroke lead over Gary Player. Two months earlier, Player had won the Masters with a blistering 64 in the final round. History, however, would not repeat itself, as this time around Player struggled to a 77 (+6) and finished in a tie for 6th. North owned a four-shot lead over Snead heading to the back-nine, and after birdies at 11 and 13 he appeared to have the championship wrapped up. A bogey at 14, however, combined with a double-bogey at 15 and a birdie by Dave Stockton at the same hole dropped his lead to just one. Stockton, however, missed an 18-footer (5.5 m) for par at 18, increasing North's lead to two.

Snead had a chance for birdie at the last after his tee shot skipped off the water and onto the fairway, but he missed the birdie putt. Needing just a bogey at 18 to win, North's drive found the rough. He hit his second shot into the fairway, then his third found a greenside bunker. Needing to get up-and-down, he played his sand shot to five feet (1.5 m) and after backing off twice, sank the bogey putt for the one-stroke win.

Place	Player	Score	To par	Money ($)
1	(United States) Andy North	70-70-71-74=285	+1	45,000
T2	(United States) J. C. Snead	70-72-72-72=286	+2	19,750
T2	(United States) Dave Stockton	71-73-70-72=286	+2	19,750
T4	(United States) Hale Irwin	69-74-75-70=288	+4	13,000
T4	(United States) Tom Weiskopf	77-73-70-68=288	+4	13,000
T6	(United States) Andy Bean	72-72-71-74=289	+5	7,548
T6	(United States) Billy Kratzert	72-74-70-73=289	+5	7,548
T6	(United States) Johnny Miller	78-69-68-74=289	+5	7,548
T6	(United States) Jack Nicklaus	73-69-74-73=289	+5	7,548
T6	(South Africa) Gary Player	71-71-70-77=289	+5	7,548
T6	(United States) Tom Watson	74-75-70-70=289	+5	7,548

Amateurs: Bobby Clampett (+13), Jim Holtgrieve (+20)

==== Scorecard ====
Final round

Hole	1	2	3	4	5	6	7	8	9	10	11	12	13	14	15	16	17	18
Par	4	4	4	4	5	3	4	3	4	4	5	3	4	4	3	4	5	4
(United States) North	−2	−2	−2	−3	−4	−4	−4	−3	−2	−1	−2	−2	−3	−2	E	E	E	+1
(United States) Snead	+1	+1	+1	+1	+1	E	E	+1	+2	+2	+2	+2	+2	+2	+2	+2	+2	+2
(United States) Stockton	+1	+2	+2	+2	+2	+2	+2	+2	+2	+2	+1	+1	+1	+2	+1	+1	+1	+2
(United States) Irwin	+6	+6	+6	+6	+5	+4	+4	+5	+4	+5	+4	+4	+4	+4	+4	+4	+3	+4
(United States) Weiskopf	+7	+7	+7	+7	+6	+6	+6	+6	+7	+6	+5	+5	+5	+5	+5	+5	+4	+4
(South Africa) Player	−1	E	+1	+1	+1	+1	+1	+2	+3	+3	+3	+4	+4	+4	+5	+5	+4	+5

Cumulative tournament scores, relative to par

Birdie	Bogey	Double bogey
