= 1941 PGA Championship =

Coordinates: 39.643°N 104.963°W

Tournament information
- Dates: July 7–13, 1941
- Location: Englewood, Colorado, U.S.
- Course: Cherry Hills Country Club
- Organized by: PGA of America
- Tour: PGA Tour
- Format: Match play - 6 rounds

Statistics
- Par: 71
- Length: 6,888 yards (6,298 m)
- Field: 97 players, 64 to match play
- Cut: 154 (+12), playoff
- Prize fund: $10,600
- Winner's share: $1,100

Champion
- (United States) Vic Ghezzi
- def. Byron Nelson, 38 holes

Location in the United States

The 1941 PGA Championship was the 24th PGA Championship, held July 7–13 at Cherry Hills Country Club in Englewood, Colorado (now Cherry Hills Village), just south of Denver. Then a match play championship, Vic Ghezzi won his only major title over defending champion Byron Nelson in 38 holes. Nelson defeated Ralph Guldahl, Ben Hogan, and Gene Sarazen on successive days to reach his third consecutive final.

Seven of the eight quarterfinalists in 1941 won major titles during their careers. Sam Snead was the medalist in the stroke play qualifier at 138 (−4); he lost in the quarterfinals but won the first of his three titles the following year.

Due to World War II, this was the last "full field" at the PGA Championship until 1946. The match play bracket was scaled back from 64 competitors to 32 for 1942, when it and the Masters were the only majors held. The PGA Championship was the only major in 1944 and 1945; none were played in 1943 and the other three returned in 1946.

This was the last time the final match in the PGA Championship went to extra holes. The PGA Championship changed to stroke play in 1958 and its first two playoffs in 1961 and 1967 were 18 holes, before conversion to sudden-death, first used in 1977 and last in 1996. The present three-hole aggregate playoff made its debut in 2000.

This championship was the second major played at this course; the U.S. Open was held at Cherry Hills three years earlier in 1938, won by Guldahl. It later hosted the U.S. Open in 1960 and 1978, and the PGA Championship in 1985. The average elevation of the course exceeds 5,300 feet (1,620 m) above sea level.

== Format ==
The match play format at the PGA Championship in 1941 called for 12 rounds (216 holes) in seven days:

- Monday and Tuesday – 36-hole stroke play qualifier, 18 holes per day;
  - defending champion Byron Nelson and top 63 professionals advanced to match play
- Wednesday – first two rounds, 18 holes each
- Thursday – third round – 36 holes
- Friday – quarterfinals – 36 holes
- Saturday – semifinals – 36 holes
- Sunday – final – 36 holes

== Final results ==
Sunday, July 13, 1941

Place	Player	Money ($)
1	(United States) Vic Ghezzi	1,100
2	(United States) Byron Nelson	600
T3	(United States) Lloyd Mangrum	350
T3	(United States) Gene Sarazen	350
T5	(United States) Jimmy Hines	250
T5	(United States) Ben Hogan	250
T5	(United States) Denny Shute	250
T5	(United States) Sam Snead	250

== Final eight bracket ==
Quarter-finals; July 11
Vic Ghezzi	8&7
Jimmy Hines
Lloyd Mangrum	6&4
Sam Snead
Byron Nelson	2&1
Ben Hogan
Gene Sarazen	7&6
Denny Shute

Semi-finals; July 12
Vic Ghezzi	1 up
Lloyd Mangrum
Byron Nelson	2up
Gene Sarazen

Finals; July 13
Vic Ghezzi	38h
Byron Nelson

== Final match scorecards ==
Morning

Hole	1	2	3	4	5	6	7	8	9	10	11	12	13	14	15	16	17	18
Par	4	4	4	4	5	3	4	3	4	4	5	3	4	4	3	4	5	4
(United States) Ghezzi	4	3	3	4	5	3	4	3	4	3	6	3	4	5	4	4	4	5
(United States) Nelson	3	4	4	4	6	3	4	3	3	4	5	3	4	5	3	4	4	4
Leader	N1	–	G1	G1	G2	G2	G2	G2	G1	G2	G1	G1	G1	G1	–	–	–	N1

Afternoon

Hole	1	2	3	4	5	6	7	8	9	10	11	12	13	14	15	16	17	18
Par	4	4	4	4	5	3	4	3	4	4	5	3	4	4	3	4	5	4
(United States) Ghezzi	4	4	3	4	5	3	4	4	4	4	4	3	4	4	2	4	6	5
(United States) Nelson	4	3	3	5	5	2	4	3	4	5	5	4	3	5	3	4	5	5
Leader	N1	N2	N2	N1	N1	N2	N2	N3	N3	N2	N1	–	N1	–	G1	G1	–	–

Extra holes

Hole	1	2
Par	4	4
(United States) Ghezzi	4	4
(United States) Nelson	4	5
Leader	–	G1

Birdie	Bogey
