= Henry Picard =

American professional golfer (1906–1997)

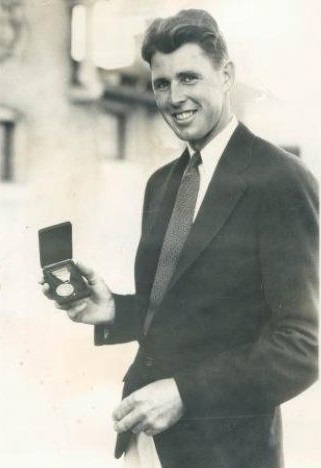
- Picard in 1934

Personal information
- Full name: Henry Gilford Picard
- Nickname: Pick
- Nationality: United States
- Born: November 28, 1906 Plymouth, Massachusetts, U.S.
- Died: April 30, 1997 (aged 90) Charleston, South Carolina, U.S.
- Spouses: Annie Addison Picard (1905–1983)
- Children: 3 sons, 1 daughter

Career
- Sport: Golf
- College: None
- Turned professional: 1925
- Former tour: PGA Tour
- Professional wins: 34

Number of wins by tour
- PGA Tour: 24
- Other: 10

Best results in major championships (wins: 2)
- Masters Tournament: Won: 1938
- PGA Championship: Won: 1939
- U.S. Open: T5: 1936
- The Open Championship: 6th: 1935

Achievements and awards
- World Golf Hall of Fame: 2006 (member page)
- PGA Tour leading money winner: 1939

Henry Gilford Picard (November 28, 1906 – April 30, 1997) was an American professional golfer.

== Career ==
Picard was born in Plymouth, Massachusetts. He learned to play golf while caddying at the Plymouth Country Club. Already a talented player by his early 20s, he came to prominence after coaching from the leading instructor Alex Morrison. A leading player on the PGA Tour in the 1930s and early 1940s, he won two major championships: the Masters in 1938 and the PGA Championship in 1939, where he defeated Byron Nelson on the 37th hole of the final. Picard ("Pick" to friends) played on both the 1935 and 1937 Ryder Cup teams, winning both singles matches and one of two pairs matches.

Picard helped a struggling Ben Hogan with his game in the late 1930s, advising him to weaken his grip, and Hogan combined this advice with his own hard work to become one of golf's all-time great players. When he left the sought-after pro's position at Hershey Country Club in early 1941, Picard recommended Hogan as his replacement, and he got the job. Hogan dedicated his first book, "Ben Hogan's Power Golf," to Picard in 1953.

Picard was pro at the Country Club of Charleston, Charleston, South Carolina, 1925–34; Hershey Country Club, Hershey, Pennsylvania, 1934–41; then moving to Twin Hills G & CC, Oklahoma City, Oklahoma, for two years, then returned to his South Carolina farm in early 1943. Other professional positions include CC of Harrisburg, Harrisburg, Pennsylvania; Canterbury Golf Club, Cleveland, Ohio; and Seminole Golf Club, Palm Beach, Florida. Among his students was Jack Grout, who later taught Jack Nicklaus.

In 1973, Picard retired from Seminole and returned to Charleston, South Carolina. He was a fixture in the local golf community in his later years, and helped future LPGA hall of famer Beth Daniel in her teens. Picard played regularly into his 80s and died at age 90 in 1997.

== Awards and honors ==
- In 1939, Picard was the PGA Tour's leading money winner.
- In 1977, he was inducted into the South Carolina Athletic Hall of Fame.
- In 2006, Picard was inducted to the World Golf Hall of Fame.

== Professional wins (34) ==
=== PGA Tour wins (24) ===
- 1932 (1) Mid-South Open (tie with Al Watrous and Al Houghton)
- 1934 (1) North and South Open
- 1935 (5) Agua Caliente Open, Tournament of the Gardens Open, Atlanta Open, Metropolitan Open, Inverness Invitational Four-Ball (with Johnny Revolta)
- 1936 (3) Tournament of the Gardens Open, North and South Open, Hershey Open
- 1937 (3) Tournament of the Gardens Open, Hershey Open, Miami International Four-Ball (with Johnny Revolta)
- 1938 (2) Pasadena Open, **Masters Tournament**
- 1939 (6) New Orleans Open, Thomasville Open, Metropolitan Open, Anthracite Open, **PGA Championship**, Inverness Invitational Four-Ball (with Johnny Revolta)
- 1941 (2) New Orleans Open, Harlingen Open-Texas
- 1945 (1) Miami Open

Major championships are shown in bold.

=== Other wins (10) ===
this list may be incomplete

- 1925 Carolinas Open
- 1926 Carolinas Open
- 1932 Carolinas Open
- 1933 Carolinas Open
- 1935 Miami International Four-Ball (with Johnny Revolta), Riverside Pro/Am
- 1936 Miami International Four-Ball (with Johnny Revolta)
- 1937 Argentine Open, St. Augustine Pro-Amateur
- 1938 Mid South Pro/Pro (with Jack Grout; tie with Tommy Armour and Bobby Cruickshank)

== Major championships ==
=== Wins (2) ===
Year	Championship	54 holes	Winning score	Margin	Runner(s)-up
1938	Masters Tournament	1 shot lead	−3 (71-72-72-70=285)	2 strokes	(United States) Harry Cooper, (United States) Ralph Guldahl
1939	PGA Championship	n/a	37 holes		(United States) Byron Nelson

=== Results timeline ===
Tournament	1932	1933	1934	1935	1936	1937	1938	1939
Masters Tournament	NYF	NYF	T23	4	T9	T33	1	8
U.S. Open			T47	T6	T5	T10	T7	T12
The Open Championship				6		T15		
PGA Championship	R16	R16		R64	R16	QF	SF	1

Tournament	1940	1941	1942	1943	1944	1945	1946	1947	1948	1949
Masters Tournament	T7		T15	NT	NT	NT	T25	T6	T25	T21
U.S. Open	T12	T26	NT	NT	NT	NT	T12	CUT		
The Open Championship	NT	NT	NT	NT	NT	NT				
PGA Championship	R16	R64		NT						

Tournament	1950	1951	1952	1953	1954	1955	1956	1957	1958	1959
Masters Tournament	T14		T52	T38		T41	T46	T35	CUT	CUT
U.S. Open	T12	T24								CUT
The Open Championship										
PGA Championship	SF	R32								

Tournament	1960	1961	1962	1963	1964	1965	1966	1967	1968	1969	1970
Masters Tournament	CUT		T39	WD		CUT	CUT	CUT	WD	CUT	WD
U.S. Open											
The Open Championship											
PGA Championship	T32					CUT					

Win
Top 10
Did not play

NYF = tournament not yet founded
NT = no tournament
WD = withdrew
CUT = missed the half-way cut
R64, R32, R16, QF, SF = Round in which player lost in PGA Championship match play
"T" indicates a tie for a place

=== Summary ===
Tournament	Wins	2nd	3rd	Top-5	Top-10	Top-25	Events	Cuts made
Masters Tournament	1	0	0	2	6	12	29	19
U.S. Open	0	0	0	1	4	9	13	11
The Open Championship	0	0	0	0	1	2	2	2
PGA Championship	1	0	2	4	8	9	13	12
Totals	2	0	2	7	19	32	57	44

- Most consecutive cuts made – 30 (1932 PGA – 1947 Masters)
- Longest streak of top-10s – 5 (1937 PGA – 1939 Masters)

== See also ==
- List of golfers with most PGA Tour wins
