= List of U.S. Open (golf) broadcasters =

As of 2020, NBC Sports is the official broadcaster of the U.S. Open, as the result of an 8–year deal with the USGA for exclusive rights to its tournaments through 2027. Coverage is telecast by NBC (over-the-air) and USA Network (cable). Coverage was previously televised by NBC and ESPN through 2014. NBC's most recent period as rights holder began in 1995; ABC held the broadcast rights from 1966 through 1994. Fox held the broadcast rights from 2015 to 2019.

== Coverage overview ==
=== American coverage ===
==== First NBC era (1954–1965) ====
NBC first began televising golf events after it was awarded the television rights to the U.S. Open in 1954. The tournament continued to air on the network through the 1965 event, however NBC rebuffed a long-term deal to broadcast the event when the United States Golf Association (USGA) decided on a true contract in 1966. The network, however, did televise a handful of PGA Tour events over the following decades.

==== ABC era (1966–1994) ====
ABC broadcast golf events for the first time in 1962 when it began televising the Open Championship as part of its anthology series Wide World of Sports. The network later gained the broadcast rights to the PGA Championship in 1965, and the U.S. Open in 1966. Chris Schenkel and Byron Nelson were the initial hosts of the tournament coverage. In 1975, Jim McKay and Dave Marr became the lead broadcast team, while Bob Rosburg joined the network as the first ever on-course reporter, and Peter Alliss joined as a co-anchor.

Beginning in 1982, ABC adopted its most well-known format of the Wide World of Sports era. The broadcast operated using anchor teams, in which an anchor and an analyst would call all of the action from the tower at the 18th hole, and the teams would be rotated on coverage after about a half-hour. Meanwhile, the three on-course reporters, which included Judy Rankin and Ed Sneed in addition to Rosburg, would be utilized when prompted by the anchor team. McKay and Marr would be the lead team, with Jack Whitaker and Alliss as the second team. Occasionally, Rosburg or Whitaker would host if McKay was unavailable, while Roger Twibell would take over the secondary team. After his 1986 Masters win, Jack Nicklaus would appear on ABC after the end of his round and served as an analyst for the rest of the telecast.

In 1990, Roger Twibell took over as lead anchor, with Dave Marr as his analyst. Peter Alliss became sole anchor of the second anchor team. During this period, ABC acquired the rights to several non-major PGA Tour events, mostly important events such as the Memorial Tournament and The Tour Championship. 1990 would also mark the final PGA Championship to be broadcast by ABC.

In 1992, Brent Musburger, who had been heavily criticized for his hosting of golf coverage while with CBS, took over as host. Marr was dismissed from the network, while Twibell was reassigned to ESPN's golf coverage, although he occasionally hosted on ABC for a few lower-level tournaments. The format was also reorganized to more emphasize the on-course reporters. Steve Melnyk moved over from CBS to become lead analyst; however, Alliss would anchor for stretches during the telecast. Beyond the team in the booth, all of ABC's other voices were on the course, including Rankin, Rosburg, and newcomer Mark Rolfing.

In 1993, ABC used Peter Jacobsen as a lead analyst; however, Jacobsen returned to playing in 1994 and Melnyk returned to the lead analyst position. ABC continued to hold the television rights to select PGA Tour events, with the schedule increasing slightly as a result of a new television deal with the PGA Tour in 1995, however it still mostly emphasized only the important tournament events. The network lost the rights to the U.S. Open following an ugly split from the United States Golf Association (USGA) in 1994. Nicklaus held his position of entering the booth during the major championship telecasts through the period from 1992 to 1996.

==== Second NBC era (1995–2014) ====
In 1995, NBC Sports acquired rights to the USGA championships, including the U.S. Open, from ESPN/ABC. ESPN retained rights to a portion of the weekday coverage, however, NBC was the dominant rights holder, including exclusive coverage of the weekend rounds. This took NBC's coverage to a new level and marked the first time in the modern era of television that the network had televised a major championship. NBC, the Yanni composed theme music, "In Celebration of Man", and its lead analyst Johnny Miller (who joined NBC in 1990) became synonymous with the U.S. Open, televising it for the next 20 years, through 2014.

==== Fox era (2015–2019) ====
On August 6, 2013, Fox Sports announced a 12-year deal to broadcast the three open championships of the USGA: the U.S. Open, U.S. Women's Open, and U.S. Senior Open, beginning in 2015. Fox succeeded the USGA's long-term relationships with NBC Sports and ESPN. Fox, which had televised just one PGA Tour sanctioned event in its history (the unofficial CVS Charity Classic in 2011), paid $1 billion for full rights to all USGA championships.

The Fox network airs the final two days of the U.S. Open, Women's Open, Senior Open, and Amateur, as well as late coverage of the first two days of the U.S. Open. The rest of the coverage airs on Fox Sports 1. Also, the final two days of the U.S. Open air on Spanish-language channel Fox Deportes.

On April 23, 2014, Fox Sports announced that Greg Norman would join Joe Buck as its lead golf commentary team. Buck and Norman worked together for the first time at the 2014 U.S. Open, where Fox produced studio programming that aired against ESPN and NBC's studio shows.

On November 18, 2014, in advance of its coverage of the Franklin Templeton Shootout, Fox announced the full layout of its golf team.

- Booth announcers: Joe Buck, Greg Norman
- Tower announcers: Steve Flesch
- On-course reporters: Juli Inkster, Curtis Strange, Scott McCarron, Ken Brown
- Rules analyst: David Fay
- Studio: Shane O'Donoghue, Gil Hanse, Mark Brooks

In January 2016, Greg Norman was let go by Fox in response to poor reception towards his performance during the U.S. Open and was replaced by former ESPN analyst Paul Azinger. The network's 2016 U.S. Open team:

The network's 2016 U.S. Open team:

- Play-by-play: Joe Buck, Shane O'Donoghue
- Analysts: Paul Azinger, Mark Brooks, Jay Delsing, Brad Faxon, David Fay, Steve Flesch, Natalie Gulbis, Gil Hanse, Juli Inkster, Buddy Marucci, Scott McCarron
- On-course reporters: Ken Brown, Steve Scott, Curtis Strange

In 2017, Fox made several changes to the commentator team:

- Lead announcers: Joe Buck, Paul Azinger
- Play-by-play: Shane O'Donoghue
- Studio Analysts: Darren Clarke, Brad Faxon
- On-course reporters: Shane Bacon, Steve Flesch, Juli Inkster, Curtis Strange, Ken Brown
- Rules analyst: David Fay
- Course design analyst: Gil Hanse
- Studio Host: Holly Sonders

For the 2018 U.S. Open, Fox announced that they would be splitting their lead commentary booths into two teams. This was done in an effort to avoid the occasional logjam caused by a three-man booth, which had been Joe Buck with analysts Paul Azinger and Brad Faxon. Therefore, Azinger would now be paired with Buck, and Faxon would be paired alongside Shane Bacon.

On June 29, 2020, it was confirmed Fox had withdrawn from their 12-year deal with the USGA, and that NBCUniversal had taken over the remainder of the contract through to 2026.

==== Third NBC era (2020–2032) ====
Having reacquired broadcasting rights to USGA championships, NBC was set to air the rescheduled 2020 U.S. Open in September; the tournament had originally been scheduled for June before being postponed due to the COVID-19 pandemic.

On August 12, 2025, NBC announced that it has signed a new six-year deal beginning in 2027 and going through 2032 for all USGA championships, with additional hours of programming slated on the NBC Broadcast network (Fox will not be responsible for paying any piece of these rights after having to pay the remaining of its current rights of the tournament through 2026).

=== International coverage ===
In Australia, from 2015 Fox Sports Australia is the exclusive broadcaster of the U.S. Open until 2018.

In Canada, TSN, in english, and RDS, in french, are the broadcaster of the US Open.

In the United Kingdom, Sky Sports is the exclusive broadcaster for the U.S. Open.

In the past, ITV held the rights from the late 1970s/to 1983. From 1984 to 1985, the event was shown on Channel 4. The BBC took over from 1986 to 1993.

== Commentators ==
=== Play-by-play/anchors ===
Announcer	Years	Network(s)
Chris Berman	1986–2014	ESPN
Joe Buck	2015–2019	Fox
Bob Costas	2003–2013	NBC
Dick Enberg	1995–1999	NBC
Bill Flemming	1966	ABC
Frank Gifford	1971–1973	ABC
Chick Hearn	1959–1965	NBC
Dan Hicks	1995–2014; 2020–present	NBC
Keith Jackson	1967	ABC
Henry Longhurst	1967	ABC
Jim McKay	1966–1993	ABC
Brent Musburger	1992–1994	ABC
Lindsey Nelson	1954–1965	NBC
Bud Palmer	1959–1965	NBC
Lou Palmer	1982	ESPN
Ray Scott	1959–1965	NBC
Chris Schenkel	1966–1974	ABC
Jim Simpson	1964–1965; 1982–1985	NBC; ESPN
Jim Thacker	1982	ESPN
Mike Tirico	2000–2014; 2020–present	ESPN; NBC
Roger Twibell	1990–1991	ABC
Jack Whitaker	1982–1989	ABC

=== Analysts ===
Announcer	Years	Network(s)
Peter Alliss	1975–1994	ABC
Paul Azinger	2016–present	Fox; NBC
David Feherty	2020–2022	NBC
Tony Jacklin	1974	ABC
Peter Jacobsen	1993–1994	ABC
Gary Koch	1996–2014; 2020–2022	NBC
Roger Maltbie	1995–2014; 2020–2022	NBC
Dave Marr	1974–1991	ABC
Cary Middlecoff	1982	ESPN
Johnny Miller	1995–2014	NBC
Byron Nelson	1966–1973	ABC
Jack Nicklaus	1986–1994	ABC
Greg Norman	2015	Fox
Dan Pohl	1995	NBC
Gene Sarazen	1955	NBC
John Schroeder	1995	NBC
Marilynn Smith	1973	ABC
Ed Sullivan	1959	NBC

=== On-site reporters ===
Announcer	Years	Network(s)
Dottie Pepper	2005–2012	NBC
Judy Rankin	1985–1994	ABC
Mark Rolfing	1998–2014; 2020–present	NBC
Bob Rosburg	1975–1994	ABC
Bob Trumpy	1995	NBC
Chris Myers	2019	Fox/FS1

== See also ==
- List of ESPN/ABC golf commentators
- List of NBC Sports golf commentators
