= 2004 U.S. Open (golf) =

Coordinates: 40.894°N 72.440°W

Tournament information
- Dates: June 17–20, 2004
- Location: Shinnecock Hills, New York
- Course: Shinnecock Hills Golf Club
- Organized by: USGA
- Tours: PGA Tour; European Tour; Japan Golf Tour

Statistics
- Par: 70
- Length: 6,996 yards (6,397 m)
- Field: 156 players, 66 after cut
- Cut: 146 (+6)
- Prize fund: $6,250,000 €5,203,577
- Winner's share: $1,125,000 €936,644

Champion
- (South Africa) Retief Goosen
- 276 (−4)

Location in the United States
Location in New York

The 2004 United States Open Championship was the 104th U.S. Open, held June 17–20 at Shinnecock Hills Golf Club in Shinnecock Hills, New York. Retief Goosen won his second U.S. Open title, two strokes ahead of runner-up Phil Mickelson, the reigning Masters champion. The purse was $6.25 million with a winner's share of $1.125 million.

Late on Sunday in dry and breezy conditions, Goosen birdied the 16th hole and Mickelson double-bogeyed the par-3 17th. Goosen's previous U.S. Open win was in 2001 in a playoff at Southern Hills.

== History of U.S. Open at Shinnecock Hills ==
This was the fourth U.S. Open hosted by Shinnecock Hills. The former champions were James Foulis (1896), Raymond Floyd (1986), and Corey Pavin (1995). The second U.S. Open was held at Shinnecock in 1896, but ninety years went by before it hosted again. The 1986 edition was held on a completely revamped course. Floyd, age 43, entered the final round three shots behind and shot a 66 in difficult scoring conditions to win his fourth major.

The conditions were similar in 1995, with no one under par. Pavin played the final ten holes in three-under-par on the way to a 68 and the win. He hit a memorable 4-wood to the 72nd green to within 5 feet (1.5 m) and finished at even par 280.

== Course layout ==
Hole	Yards	Par	Hole	Yards	Par
1	393	4	10	412	4
2	226	3	11	158	3
3	478	4	12	468	4
4	435	4	13	370	4
5	537	5	14	443	4
6	474	4	15	403	4
7	189	3	16	540	5
8	398	4	17	179	3
9	443	4	18	450	4
Out	3,573	35	In	3,423	35
Source:		Total		6,996	70

Lengths of the course for previous major championships:

- 6,944 yards (6,350 m), par 70 - 1995 U.S. Open
- 6,912 yards (6,320 m), par 70 - 1986 U.S. Open
- 4,423 yards (4,044 m), - 1896 U.S. Open

== Field ==
1. Last 10 U.S. Open Champions

Ernie Els (4,8,9,10,11,13,16), Jim Furyk (8,9,16), Retief Goosen (9,10,16), Lee Janzen, Corey Pavin, Tiger Woods (3,4,5,9,11,12,16)

- Steve Jones did not play.

2. Top two finishers in the 2003 U.S. Amateur

Nick Flanagan (a), Casey Wittenberg (a)

3. Last five Masters Champions

Phil Mickelson (11,16), Vijay Singh (9,11,12,16), Mike Weir (8,9,16)

4. Last five British Open Champions

Ben Curtis (16), David Duval, Paul Lawrie

5. Last five PGA Champions

Rich Beem, Shaun Micheel (16), David Toms (8,9,12,16)

6. The Players Champion

Adam Scott (10,11,12,16)

7. The U.S. Senior Open Champion

- Bruce Lietzke did not play.

8. Top 15 finishers and ties in the 2003 U.S. Open

Jonathan Byrd, Tom Byrum, Pádraig Harrington (10,16), Freddie Jacobson (10,16), Jonathan Kaye (9,12,16), Cliff Kresge, Stephen Leaney (10,16), Billy Mayfair, Kenny Perry (9,12,16), Tim Petrovic, Nick Price (9,16), Eduardo Romero, Justin Rose, Hidemichi Tanaka, Scott Verplank (9,16)

9. Top 30 leaders on the 2003 PGA Tour official money list

Robert Allenby (16), Stuart Appleby (11,16), Briny Baird, Chad Campbell (11,16), K. J. Choi (16), Chris DiMarco (16), Brad Faxon (16), Steve Flesch (11,12,16), Fred Funk, Jay Haas (16), Tim Herron, Charles Howell III (16), Jerry Kelly (16), Justin Leonard (16), J. L. Lewis, Davis Love III (11,16), Chris Riley (16), Kirk Triplett (16), Bob Tway (16)

10. Top 15 on the 2003 European Tour Order of Merit

Thomas Bjørn (16), Michael Campbell, Paul Casey (16), Darren Clarke (13,16), Brian Davis, Trevor Immelman (16), Ian Poulter, Phillip Price, Lee Westwood

11. Top 10 on the PGA Tour official money list, as of May 30

Stewart Cink (16)

12. Winners of multiple PGA Tour events from April 23, 2003, through the 2004 Memorial Tournament

13. Top 2 from the 2004 European Tour Order of Merit, as of May 31

14. Top 2 on the 2003 Japan Golf Tour, provided they are within the top 75 point leaders of the Official World Golf Rankings at that time

Toshimitsu Izawa

15. Top 2 on the 2003 PGA Tour of Australasia, provided they are within the top 75 point leaders of the Official World Golf Rankings at that time

Peter Lonard (16)

16. Top 50 on the Official World Golf Rankings list, as of May 31

Stephen Ames, Ángel Cabrera, Fred Couples, Sergio García, Todd Hamilton, Joakim Haeggman, Scott Hoch, Miguel Ángel Jiménez, Zach Johnson, Shigeki Maruyama, Craig Parry

17. Special exemptions selected by the USGA

Raymond Floyd

Sectional qualifiers

- Daly City, California: David Carr (L), Spencer Levin (a, L), Leif Olson (L), Roger Tambellini
- Littleton, Colorado: John Douma, Steve Gotsche
- Orlando, Florida: Nick Faldo, Tripp Isenhour, Camilo Villegas (L)
- Atlanta, Georgia: Thomas Levet, Scott Weatherly (L)
- Kahuku, Hawaii: Parker McLachlin (L)
- North Barrington, Illinois: Robert Garrigus (L), Carl Paulson (L)
- Rockville, Maryland: Carlos Franco, Pat Perez, Joey Sindelar, Omar Uresti (L), Bubba Watson (L)
- St. Louis, Missouri: John Elliott (L), David Roesch (L)
- Summit, New Jersey: Stephen Allan, Casey Bourque (L), Craig Bowden, Mark Brooks, Tom Carter, Kris Cox (L), Brian Gay, Matt Gogel, Dudley Hart, J. P. Hayes, Scott Hend, J. J. Henry, Gabriel Hjertstedt, Pete Jordan (L), Brad Lardon (L), Brock Mackenzie (a), Spike McRoy, David Morland IV, Dennis Paulson, Geoffrey Sisk (L), Steve Sokol (L), Kevin Stadler (L)
- Columbus, Ohio: Eric Axley (L), Aaron Baddeley, Mark Calcavecchia, Alex Čejka, Daniel Chopra, Tim Clark, John Connelly (L), Bob Estes, David Faught, Dan Forsman, Jeff Gove (L), Jimmy Green (L), Bill Haas (a), Justin Hicks (L), Brendan Jones, Skip Kendall, Jeff Maggert, Joey Maxon (L), Joe Ogilvie, Dan Olsen (L), Payton Osborn (L), Tom Pernice Jr., Chez Reavie (a), John Rollins, Rory Sabbatini, John Senden, Chris Smith, Nathan Smith (a, L), Steve Stricker, Kevin Sutherland, Bo Van Pelt, Johnson Wagner (L), Duffy Waldorf
- Sunriver, Oregon: Óscar David Álvarez (a)
- Midway, Pennsylvania: Andrew Tschudin (L)
- Richmond, Texas: Charleton Dechert (L), Tom Kite

== Round summaries ==
=== First round ===
Thursday, June 17, 2004

Fifty-year-old Jay Haas led after one round, in a bid to become the oldest major champion in history. He was joined at the lead by Shigeki Maruyama and Ángel Cabrera. Two-time major champion Vijay Singh shot a solid 68, as did current Masters champion Phil Mickelson. Former U.S. Open champions Ernie Els and Retief Goosen shot an even-par 70 after rough starts. World Number 1 Tiger Woods struggled on Shinnecock's fast conditions and settled for a two-over-par 72. David Duval shot an 83, the worst round in the field, but was in high spirits afterwards.

Place	Player	Score	To par
T1	(Argentina) Ángel Cabrera	66	−4
T1	(United States) Jay Haas	66	−4
T1	(Japan) Shigeki Maruyama	66	−4
4	(United States) Corey Pavin	67	−3
T5	(United States) Kris Cox	68	−2
T5	(United States) Ben Curtis	68	−2
T5	(United States) Steve Flesch	68	−2
T5	(United States) Skip Kendall	68	−2
T5	(United States) Jeff Maggert	68	−2
T5	(United States) Phil Mickelson	68	−2
T5	(United States) David Roesch	68	−2
T5	(Fiji) Vijay Singh	68	−2
T5	(United States) Kevin Stadler	68	−2

=== Second round ===
Friday, June 18, 2004

Phil Mickelson surged into the lead, trying to become the sixth to win the first two majors of the year, with a bogey-free 66. He tied for the lead with Shigeki Maruyama, who bogeyed the 18th hole and shot 68. Ernie Els had four consecutive birdies in a round of 67. Jeff Maggert was in solo third at five-under-par with a 67, while Fred Funk and Retief Goosen both shot 66 to tie for fourth. Ángel Cabrera had a crazy day after a 66 to shoot a 71. Corey Pavin, the previous champion at Shinnecock in 1995, tied with Vijay Singh at four strokes back. Tiger Woods shot 69 for 141 (+1), tied for 18th. World Number 4 Davis Love III missed the cut, as did David Duval.

Jay Haas (E) and amateur Bill Haas (+5) were the second father and son to make the cut in the same U.S. Open; it was first accomplished 56 years earlier in 1948 by Joe Kirkwood Sr. and Joe Kirkwood Jr.

Place	Player	Score	To par
T1	(Japan) Shigeki Maruyama	66-68=134	−6
T1	(United States) Phil Mickelson	68-66=134	−6
3	(United States) Jeff Maggert	68-67=135	−5
T4	(United States) Fred Funk	70-66=136	−4
T4	(South Africa) Retief Goosen	70-66=136	−4
T6	(Argentina) Ángel Cabrera	66-71=137	−3
T6	(South Africa) Ernie Els	70-67=137	−3
T8	(United States) Corey Pavin	67-71=138	−2
T8	(Fiji) Vijay Singh	68-70=138	−2
T10	(South Africa) Trevor Immelman	69-70=139	−1
T10	(Canada) Mike Weir	69-70=139	−1

Amateurs: Levin (+2), Wittenberg (+2), Haas (+5), Reavie (+5),
Mackenzie (+9), Smith (+9), Flanagan (+14), Álvarez (+18)

=== Third round ===
Saturday, June 19, 2004

Retief Goosen battled his way into a two-shot lead on Saturday as Shinnecock Hills presented its stiffest test of the week. He held his nerve in challenging conditions to card a one-under 69 for 205 (−5), and was one of only three to break par. Second round leader Phil Mickelson bogeyed the last two holes for a share of second place with two-time champion Ernie Els. Fred Funk and Shigeki Maruyama both had crazy days, finishing poorly for a tie for fourth. Jeff Maggert's 74 dropped him into a tie for sixth with Tim Clark, who had 66, the best of the day; Tiger Woods eagled the 18th for 73 and Vijay Singh stumbled with a 77.

Place	Player	Score	To par
1	(South Africa) Retief Goosen	70-66-69=205	−5
T2	(South Africa) Ernie Els	70-67-70=207	−3
T2	(United States) Phil Mickelson	68-66-73=207	−3
T4	(United States) Fred Funk	70-66-72=208	−2
T4	(Japan) Shigeki Maruyama	66-68-74=208	−2
T6	(South Africa) Tim Clark	73-70-66=209	−1
T6	(United States) Jeff Maggert	68-67-74=209	−1
8	(Canada) Mike Weir	69-70-71=210	E
T9	(Spain) Sergio García	72-68-71=211	+1
T9	(United States) Corey Pavin	67-71-73=211	+1

=== Final round ===
Sunday, June 20, 2004

Retief Goosen held his nerve and won his second U.S. Open, edging out Phil Mickelson by two shots with a closing 71 (+1) on Sunday to finish at four-under 276. Conditions were brutal on the final day when the average final-round score was 78.7 and no one was under par. Mickelson, urged on by raucous New York galleries on a windswept sunny afternoon, completed a matching 71 for his third runner-up spot in the last six U.S. Opens. Goosen led by two going into the final day, but was overtaken by Mickelson in the closing stretch, with back-to-back birdies on 15 and 16. But Mickelson, bidding to become the sixth player to win the first two majors of the year, immediately fell back with a double-bogey at the par-three 17th, three-putting from five feet (1.5 m). In the final pair with compatriot Ernie Els, Goosen restored his two-shot advantage with a twelve-foot (3.7 m) birdie putt on 16 and parred the final two holes to seal the title.

In a nearly unprecedented action, the USGA watered a few of the greens during play including the 7th green when players were not able to prevent the ball from rolling off. As a result, the leaders faced much easier playing conditions than the rest of the field and the final 5 groups had a scoring average of 75.9, compared to the field's 78.7, including 3 of the 5 lowest rounds of the day.

Jeff Maggert (72) finished third at one-over 281, while 2003 Masters champion Mike Weir (74) and Shigeki Maruyama (76) were three shots further back at 284 in a tie for fourth. World number two Els, joint second overnight with Mickelson, produced four double-bogeys on his way to an 80 (+10), his worst score in a U.S. Open, and tied for ninth at 287. Top-ranked Tiger Woods, who began nine shots off the lead, battled to a 76 and a share of 17th place. A mix of five bogeys, a double-bogey and a birdie at the last left him at 290 (+10) as he narrowly avoided his worst round at a U.S. Open. His career high of 77 came as an amateur in 1996, in the third round at Oakland Hills. Robert Allenby had the low round of the day at even-par 70; three birdies and three bogeys lifted him into a tie for seventh with Steve Flesch at six-over 286; Fred Funk (77) was alone in sixth on 285.

Place	Player	Score	To par	Money ($)
1	(South Africa) Retief Goosen	70-66-69-71=276	−4	1,125,000
2	(United States) Phil Mickelson	68-66-73-71=278	−2	675,000
3	(United States) Jeff Maggert	68-67-74-72=281	+1	424,604
T4	(Japan) Shigeki Maruyama	66-68-74-76=284	+4	267,756
T4	(Canada) Mike Weir	69-70-71-74=284	+4	267,756
6	(United States) Fred Funk	70-66-72-77=285	+5	212,444
T7	(Australia) Robert Allenby	70-72-74-70=286	+6	183,828
T7	(United States) Steve Flesch	68-74-70-74=286	+6	183,828
T9	(Trinidad and Tobago) Stephen Ames	74-66-73-74=287	+7	145,282
T9	(United States) Chris DiMarco	71-71-70-75=287	+7	145,282
T9	(South Africa) Ernie Els	70-67-70-80=287	+7	145,282
T9	(United States) Jay Haas	66-74-76-71=287	+7	145,282

Amateurs: Levin (+8), Wittenberg (+16), Haas (+17), Reavie (+24)

==== Scorecard ====
Hole	1	2	3	4	5	6	7	8	9	10	11	12	13	14	15	16	17	18
Par	4	3	4	4	5	4	3	4	4	4	3	4	4	4	4	5	3	4
(South Africa) Goosen	−6	−5	−5	−5	−5	−5	−5	−4	−4	−3	−4	−4	−4	−3	−3	−4	−4	−4
(United States) Mickelson	−3	−3	−2	−3	−3	−3	−3	−3	−3	−2	−2	−1	−2	−2	−3	−4	−2	−2
(United States) Maggert	−2	−1	−1	E	−1	−1	−1	+1	E	+1	+1	+1	E	E	+1	+1	E	+1
(Japan) Maruyama	−1	E	E	E	−1	E	+1	+1	+2	+2	+2	+3	+3	+4	+4	+3	+4	+4
(Canada) Weir	+1	+2	+3	+2	+2	+3	+4	+4	+4	+4	+4	+4	+4	+4	+5	+4	+4	+4
(United States) Funk	−2	−1	E	E	+1	+1	+3	+3	+3	+4	+4	+3	+3	+4	+4	+3	+4	+5
(South Africa) Els	−1	−1	−2	−1	E	E	+1	+3	+3	+5	+4	+4	+5	+7	+7	+7	+7	+7

Cumulative tournament scores, relative to par

Birdie	Bogey	Double bogey
