= Shane O'Donoghue =

Shane O'Donoghue may refer to:

- Shane O'Donoghue (field hockey) (born 1992), Irish field hockey player
- Shane O'Donoghue (journalist), Irish golf journalist
