= 1995 U.S. Open (golf) =

Tournament information
- Dates: June 15–18, 1995
- Location: Shinnecock Hills, New York; 40.894°N 72.440°W
- Course: Shinnecock Hills Golf Club
- Organized by: USGA
- Tour: PGA Tour

Statistics
- Par: 70
- Length: 6,944 yards (6,350 m)
- Field: 156 players, 73 after cut
- Cut: 146 (+6)
- Prize fund: $2.0 million
- Winner's share: $350,000

Champion
- (United States) Corey Pavin
- 280 (E)

Location map
- Location in the United States Location in New York

The 1995 U.S. Open was the 95th U.S. Open, held June 15–18 at Shinnecock Hills Golf Club in Southampton, New York. It marked the 100th anniversary of the U.S. Open. Corey Pavin won his only major championship, two strokes ahead of runner-up Greg Norman.

Norman opened with rounds of 68-67, then fell back with 74 in the third round; Tom Lehman's 67 on Saturday tied Norman for the 54-hole lead. Phil Mickelson and Bob Tway were a stroke back at even par, while Pavin was at 212 (+2), tied for fifth with four others.

In the final round, Norman and Lehman were still tied at the turn, but Lehman bogeyed 11 and Norman bogeyed 12. Pavin had birdied 12, which brought him into a tie with Norman, Lehman, and Tway. Norman and Tway each then suffered bogeys, while Pavin took sole possession of the lead with a birdie at 15. Even with a Norman birdie at the 15th, his first since the opening hole of the third round, nobody could catch Pavin. He sealed the victory with a 4-wood approach to the 18th, running down the fairway as the ball was in the air and raising his hands in triumph after it ran onto the green. He carded a 68 for an even-par 280, two ahead of Norman, who shot 73.

In the final round, Neal Lancaster set a new U.S. Open record with a 29 on the back nine. Nineteen-year-old Tiger Woods, the reigning U.S. Amateur champion, played in his first U.S. Open but withdrew during the second round with a wrist injury.

This was the third U.S. Open at Shinnecock Hills (1896, 1986); it returned in 2004, 2018, and 2026.

== Course layout ==
Hole	Yards	Par	Hole	Yards	Par
1	394	4	10	409	4
2	226	3	11	158	3
3	453	4	12	472	4
4	408	4	13	377	4
5	535	5	14	444	4
6	471	4	15	415	4
7	188	3	16	544	5
8	367	4	17	186 / 169	3
9	447	4	18	450	4
Out	3,489	35	In	3,455 / 3,438	35
Source:		Total		6,944 / 6,927	70

Lengths of the course for previous major championships:

- 6,912 yards (6,320 m), par 70 - 1986 U.S. Open
- 4,423 yards (4,044 m), par - 1896 U.S. Open

== Television ==
After an absence of thirty years, NBC Sports returned as the broadcaster of the U.S. Open in the United States. The event was previously carried by ABC Sports for 29 years, from 1966 to 1994. NBC carried the championship from 1954 through 1965, then from 1995 through 2014 and again from 2020 to 2032.

== Round summaries ==
=== First round ===
Thursday, June 15, 1995

Place	Player	Score	To par
1	(Zimbabwe) Nick Price	66	−4
2	(United States) Scott Simpson	67	−3
T3	(United States) Phil Mickelson	68	−2
T3	(Australia) Greg Norman	68	−2
T5	(United States) Bill Glasson	69	−1
T5	(United States) Steve Lowery	69	−1
T5	(United States) Jeff Maggert	69	−1
T5	(Japan) Masashi Ozaki	69	−1
T5	(United States) Bob Tway	69	−1
T5	(United States) Fuzzy Zoeller	69	−1

=== Second round ===
Friday, June 16, 1995

Place	Player	Score	To par
1	(Australia) Greg Norman	68-67=135	−5
2	(Japan) Masashi Ozaki	69-68=137	−3
T3	(United States) Phil Mickelson	68-70=138	−2
T3	(United States) Bob Tway	69-69=138	−2
T5	(United States) Bill Glasson	69-70=139	−1
T5	(Zimbabwe) Nick Price	66-73=139	−1
T7	(United States) Curt Byrum	70-70=140	E
T7	(England) Nick Faldo	72-68=140	E
T7	(United States) Davis Love III	72-68=140	E
T7	(England) Mark Roe	71-69=140	E

Amateurs: Courville (+9), Tidland (+9), Woods (WD).

=== Third round ===
Saturday, June 17, 1995

Place	Player	Score	To par
T1	(United States) Tom Lehman	70-72-67=209	−1
T1	(Australia) Greg Norman	68-67-74=209	−1
T3	(United States) Phil Mickelson	68-70-72=210	E
T3	(United States) Bob Tway	69-69-72=210	E
T5	(United States) Corey Pavin	72-69-71=212	+2
T5	(Zimbabwe) Nick Price	66-73-73=212	+2
T5	(United States) Steve Stricker	71-70-71=212	+2
T5	(United States) Scott Verplank	72-69-71=212	+2
T5	(Wales) Ian Woosnam	72-71-69=212	+2
T10	(United States) Davis Love III	72-68-73=213	+3
T10	(Fiji) Vijay Singh	70-71-72=213	+3

=== Final round ===
Sunday, June 18, 1995

Place	Player	Score	To par	Money ($)
1	(United States) Corey Pavin	72-69-71-68=280	E	350,000
2	(Australia) Greg Norman	68-67-74-73=282	+2	207,000
3	(United States) Tom Lehman	70-72-67-74=283	+3	131,974
T4	(United States) Bill Glasson	69-70-76-69=284	+4	66,633
T4	(United States) Jay Haas	70-73-72-69=284	+4	66,633
T4	(United States) Neal Lancaster	70-72-77-65=284	+4	66,633
T4	(United States) Davis Love III	72-68-73-71=284	+4	66,633
T4	(United States) Jeff Maggert	69-72-77-66=284	+4	66,633
T4	(United States) Phil Mickelson	68-70-72-74=284	+4	66,633
T10	(New Zealand) Frank Nobilo	72-72-70-71=285	+5	44,184
T10	(Fiji) Vijay Singh	70-71-72-72=285	+5	44,184
T10	(United States) Bob Tway	69-69-72-75=285	+5	44,184

==== Scorecard ====
Hole	1	2	3	4	5	6	7	8	9	10	11	12	13	14	15	16	17	18
Par	4	3	4	4	5	4	3	4	4	4	3	4	4	4	4	5	3	4
(United States) Pavin	+2	+2	+3	+3	+3	+3	+3	+3	+2	+2	+2	+1	+1	+1	E	E	E	E
(Australia) Norman	−1	E	E	E	E	E	E	E	E	E	E	+1	+2	+2	+1	+1	+2	+2
(United States) Lehman	−1	−1	−2	−1	−1	−1	E	ｰ1	E	+1	+2	+1	+1	+1	+1	+3	+3	+3
(United States) Glasson	+5	+6	+5	+4	+3	+3	+3	+3	+4	+5	+5	+5	+5	+5	+6	+5	+4	+4
(United States) Haas	+5	+5	+4	+5	+4	+4	+4	+3	+4	+5	+5	+5	+5	+4	+4	+4	+4	+4
(United States) Lancaster	+9	+9	+9	+9	+8	+8	+8	+9	+10	+10	+9	+8	+7	+6	+6	+5	+4	+4
(United States) Love	+2	+2	+3	+2	+1	+1	+1	+1	+1	+1	+1	+1	+2	+2	+2	+2	+2	+4
(United States) Maggert	+7	+8	+8	+8	+7	+7	+7	+7	+7	+7	+6	+6	+6	+5	+5	+4	+4	+4
(United States) Mickelson	E	+1	+1	+1	+1	+1	+1	+2	+2	+3	+3	+3	+3	+2	+2	+4	+3	+4
(United States) Tway	E	−1	−1	−1	−1	−1	−1	E	E	+1	+1	+1	+1	+2	+2	+3	+4	+5

Cumulative tournament scores, relative to par

Birdie	Bogey	Double bogey
