= Bob Costas =

American sportscaster (born 1952)

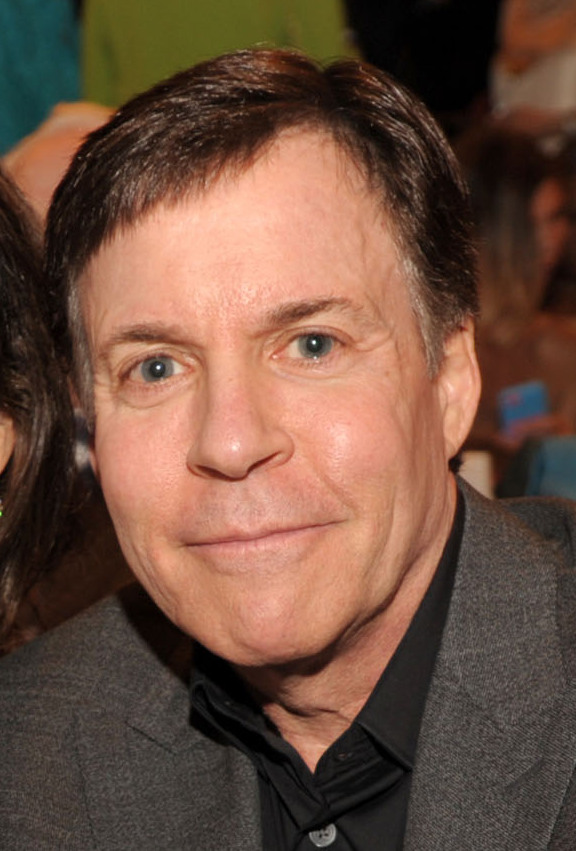
- Costas in 2014
- Born: Robert Quinlan Costas; March 22, 1952 (age 74); New York City, U.S.
- Education: Syracuse University (did not graduate)
- Occupation: Sportscaster
- Years active: 1973–present
- Spouses: Carole Krummenacher (m. 1983; div. 2001) Jill Sutton (m. 2004)
- Children: 2

Robert Quinlan Costas (born March 22, 1952) is an American sportscaster for MLB Network and NBC Sports. He is well known for his time with NBC Sports, where he worked from 1980 through 2019, and again since 2026. He has received 29 Emmy awards for his work and was the prime-time host of 12 Olympic Games from 1988 until 2016. He is also currently employed by Warner Bros. Discovery, where he is a political commentator for CNN on issues pertaining to sports.

== Early life and education ==
Costas is the son of John George Costas and Jayne Costas (née Quinlan). His paternal grandparents were Greek immigrants from Athens and Kefalovryso on Kalymnos while his maternal family is of Irish descent. He grew up in Commack, New York, and attended Commack High School South.

He attended the S. I. Newhouse School of Public Communications at Syracuse University, but dropped out in 1974. Costas got his first radio experience as a freshman at WAER, a student run radio station. In the mid-1980s, he established the Robert Costas Scholarship at the Newhouse School, of which the first recipient was Mike Tirico in 1987.

== Broadcasting career ==
=== Early career ===
While studying communications in college, Costas began his professional career in 1973, at WSYR-TV (Note: Not to be confused with the present-day WSYR-TV.) (now WSTM-TV) and WSYR-FM radio in Syracuse. He called for the minor league Syracuse Blazers of the Eastern Hockey League.

After leaving school in 1974, he joined KMOX radio in St. Louis. He covered games of the American Basketball Association (ABA). Costas would call Missouri Tigers basketball and co-host KMOX's Open Line call-in program. He did play-by-play for Chicago Bulls broadcasts on WGN-TV during the 1979–1980 NBA season.

=== NBC Sports ===
In 1980, Costas was hired by NBC. Don Ohlmeyer, who at the time ran NBC's sports division, told 28-year-old Costas he looked like a 14-year-old.

For many years, Costas hosted NBC's National Football League (NFL) coverage and National Basketball Association (NBA) coverage. He also did play-by-play for NBA and Major League Baseball (MLB) coverage. With the introduction of the NBC Sports Network, Costas also became the host of the new monthly interview program Costas Tonight.

==== Boxing ====
On March 30, 2015, it was announced that Costas would join forces with Marv Albert (blow-by-blow) and Al Michaels (host) on the April 11, 2015, edition of NBC's primetime PBC on NBC boxing series. Costas was added to serve as a special contributor for the event from Barclays Center in Brooklyn. He would narrate and write a feature on the storied history of boxing in New York City.

==== Golf ====
Costas hosted NBC's coverage of the U.S. Open golf tournament from 2003 to 2014.

==== Major League Baseball ====
For baseball telecasts, Costas teamed with Sal Bando (1982), Tony Kubek (from 1983 to 1989), and Joe Morgan and Bob Uecker (from 1994 to 2000). One of his most memorable broadcasts occurred on June 23, 1984 (in what would go down in baseball lore as "The Sandberg Game"). Costas, along with Tony Kubek, was calling the Saturday baseball Game of the Week from Chicago's Wrigley Field. The game between the Chicago Cubs and St. Louis Cardinals in particular was cited for putting Ryne Sandberg (as well as the 1984 Cubs in general, who would go on to make their first postseason appearance since 1945) "on the map". In the ninth inning, the Cubs, trailing 9–8, faced the premier relief pitcher of the time, Bruce Sutter. Sandberg, then not known for his power, slugged a home run to left field against the Cardinals' ace closer. Despite this dramatic act, the Cardinals scored two runs in the top of the tenth. Sandberg came up again in the tenth inning, facing a determined Sutter with one man on base. Sandberg then shocked the national audience by hitting a second home run, even farther into the left field bleachers, to tie the game again. The Cubs went on to win in the 11th inning. When Sandberg hit that second home run, Costas said, "Do you believe it?!" The Cardinals' Willie McGee also hit for the cycle in the same game.

While hosting Game 4 of the 1988 World Series between the Los Angeles Dodgers and Oakland Athletics on NBC, Costas angered many members of the Dodgers (especially the team's manager, Tommy Lasorda) by commenting before the start of the game that the Dodgers quite possibly were about to put up the weakest-hitting lineup in World Series history. That comment ironically fired up the Dodgers' competitive spirit, to the point where a chant of "Kill Costas!" began among the clubhouse, while the Dodgers eventually rolled to a 4–1 series victory.

Besides calling the 1989 American League Championship Series for NBC, Costas also filled in for a suddenly ill Vin Scully, who had come down with laryngitis, for Game 2 of the 1989 National League Championship Series alongside Tom Seaver. Game 2 of the NLCS took place on Thursday, October 5, which was an off day for the ALCS. NBC then decided to fly Costas from Toronto to Chicago to substitute for Scully on Thursday night. Afterward, Costas flew back to Toronto, where he resumed work on the ALCS the next night.

Costas anchored NBC's pre- and post-game shows for NFL broadcasts and the pre and post-game shows for numerous World Series and Major League Baseball All-Star Games during the 1980s (the first being for the 1982 World Series). Costas did not get a shot at doing play-by-play (as the games on NBC were previously called by Vin Scully) for an All-Star Game until 1994 and a World Series until 1995 (when NBC split the coverage with ABC under "The Baseball Network" umbrella), when NBC regained Major League Baseball rights after a four-year hiatus (when the broadcast network television contract moved over to CBS, exclusively). It was not until 1997 when Costas finally got to do play-by-play for a World Series from start to finish. Costas ended up winning a Sports Emmy Award for Outstanding Sports Personality, Play-by-Play.

In 1999, Costas teamed with his then-NBC colleague Joe Morgan to call two weekday night telecasts for ESPN. The first was on Wednesday, August 25 with the Detroit Tigers playing against the Seattle Mariners.

On August 3, 2019, Costas alongside Paul O'Neill and David Cone called both games of a double-header between the New York Yankees and Boston Red Sox for the YES Network. Costas was filling in for Michael Kay, who was recovering from vocal cord surgery.

On August 20, 2021, reports emerged that TBS was nearing an agreement with Costas to host their coverage of that year's NLCS. This became true when TBS announce his role on October 7, 2021.

On October 31, 2024, Costas announced that he was officially retiring from Major League Baseball play-by-play calling after 44 years. This means that his final Major League Baseball broadcast as a play-by-play announcer was Game 4 of the 2024 American League Division Series between the New York Yankees and Kansas City Royals, airing on TBS.

==== NASCAR ====
In November 2017, it was announced that Costas would co-anchor alongside Krista Voda on NBC's pre-race coverage leading into the NASCAR Cup Series finale from Homestead. In addition to hosting pre-race coverage, Costas would conduct a live interview with incoming NBC broadcaster Dale Earnhardt Jr., who was running his final race.

==== National Basketball Association ====
Costas served as NBC's lead play-by-play announcer for their National Basketball Association (NBA) broadcasts from 1997-2000. In that time frame, Costas called three NBA Finals including the 1998 installment (which set an all-time ratings record for the NBA) between the Chicago Bulls and Utah Jazz. Costas was paired with Isiah Thomas and Doug Collins on NBC's NBA telecast. Following the 2000 NBA Finals, he was replaced by Marv Albert as the lead play-by-play announcer, who incidentally, the man he directly replaced on the NBA on NBC in the first place.

Costas had previously presided as host of NBC's pre-game show, NBA Showtime, while also providing play-by-play as a fill-in when necessary. Costas later co-anchored (with Hannah Storm) NBC's NBA Finals coverage in 2002, which was their last to-date (before the NBA's network television contract moved to ABC).

Okay, Marv, thanks very much. And as Marv himself would say, "it should be pointed out" that Marv is celebrating his forty-ninth birthday tonight for a record twelfth consecutive year. Well, another season is in the books. The Lakers' title run continues with perhaps no end in sight. But as Marv said, we have reached the end of our run with the NBA. NBC's twelve years televising the league had been filled with indelible moments. And so, as we say good night, here's an appreciative look back. And for one last time, you've been watching the NBA on NBC.

— Bob Costas closing out NBC's final NBA broadcast, Game 4 of the 2002 NBA Finals on June 12, 2002.

==== Professional football ====
Costas began as a play-by-play announcer, working with analyst Bob Trumpy. In 1984, he would replace Len Berman as studio host. Among his NFL colleagues was O.J. Simpson, who had called 30 Rockefeller Plaza asking to speak to Costas during Simpson's infamous police chase through the freeways of Los Angeles. However, Costas was several blocks away at Madison Square Garden covering Game 5 of the 1994 NBA Finals. Costas learned of the attempted contact when visiting Simpson in prison later that year. Costas remained NFL studio host until 1992, when he was replaced by Jim Lampley.

NBC Sports allowed Costas to opt out from having to cover the XFL. He publicly denigrated the league throughout its existence and remains a vocal critic of the XFL and its premise.

In 2006, Costas returned to NFL studio hosting duties for NBC's new Sunday Night Football, hosting its pre-game show Football Night in America.

Costas is nicknamed "Rapping Roberto" by New York City's Daily News sports media columnist Bob Raissman. Al Michaels also called him "Rapping Roberto" during the telecast between the Indianapolis Colts and the New York Giants on September 10, 2006, in response to Costas calling him "Alfalfa".

==== Olympics (1988–2016) ====
Costas has frontlined many Olympics broadcasts for NBC. They include Seoul in 1988, Barcelona in 1992, Atlanta in 1996, Sydney in 2000, Salt Lake City in 2002, Athens in 2004, Torino in 2006, Beijing in 2008, Vancouver in 2010, London in 2012, Sochi in 2014 and Rio de Janeiro in 2016. He discusses his work on the Olympic telecasts extensively in a book by Andrew Billings entitled Olympic Media: Inside the Biggest Show on Television. A personal influence on Costas has been legendary ABC Sports broadcaster Jim McKay, who hosted many Olympics for ABC from the 1960s to the 1980s.

During the 1992 Barcelona and 1996 Atlanta Opening Ceremonies, Costas's remarks on China's teams' possible drug use caused an uproar among the American Chinese and international communities. Thousands of dollars were raised to purchase ads in The Washington Post and Sunday The New York Times, featuring an image of the head of a statue of Apollo and reading: "Costas Poisoned Olympic Spirit, Public Protests NBC". However, Costas's comments were made subsequent to the suspension of Chinese coach Zhou Ming after seven of his swimmers were caught using steroids in 1994. Further evidence of Chinese athletes' drug use came in 1997 when Australian authorities confiscated 13 vials of Somatropin, a human growth hormone, from the bag of Chinese swimmer Yuan Yuan upon her arrival for the 1997 World Swimming Championships. At the World Championships, four Chinese swimmers tested positive for the banned substance Triamterene, a diuretic used to dilute urine samples to mask the presence of anabolic steroids. Including these failed drug tests, 27 Chinese swimmers were caught using performance-enhancing drugs from 1990 through 1997; more than the rest of the world combined.

Along with co-host Meredith Vieira and Matt Lauer, Costas's commentary of the 2012 Summer Olympics Opening Ceremonies came under fierce criticism, with Costas being described as making "a series of jingoistic remarks, including a joke about dictator Idi Amin when Uganda's team appeared" and the combined commentary as being "ignorant" and "banal".

Following the Olympics, Costas appeared on Conan O'Brien's talk show and jokingly criticized his employer for its decision to air a preview of the upcoming series Animal Practice over a performance by The Who during the London closing ceremonies. "So here is the balance NBC has to consider: The Who, 'Animal Practice'. Roger Daltrey, Pete Townshend—monkey in a lab coat. I'm sure you'd be the first to attest, Conan, that when it comes to the tough calls, NBC usually gets 'em right," Costas said, alluding at the end to O'Brien's involvement in the 2010 Tonight Show conflict.

An eye infection Costas had at the start of the 2014 Winter Olympics forced him, on February 11, 2014, to cede his Olympic hosting duties to Matt Lauer (four nights) and Meredith Vieira (two nights), the first time Costas had not done so at all since the 1998 Winter Olympics (as the rights were not held by NBC).

==== Thoroughbred racing ====
From 2001 until 2018, Costas co-hosted the Kentucky Derby. In 2009, he hosted Bravo's coverage of the 2009 Kentucky Oaks. After Costas officially departed from NBC Sports, his role on NBC's thoroughbred racing coverage was essentially filled-in by Rebecca Lowe, beginning with the 2019 Kentucky Derby.

==== Departure from NBC Sports ====
On February 9, 2017, Costas announced during Today that he had begun the process of stepping down from his main on-air roles at NBC Sports, announcing in particular that he would cede his role as primetime host for NBC's Olympics coverage to Mike Tirico (who joined the network from ESPN in 2016), and that he would host Super Bowl LII as his final Super Bowl. However, Costas ultimately dropped out of the coverage entirely.

USA Today reported that he would similarly step down from Football Night in America in favor of Tirico. Costas explained that he was not outright retiring and expected to take on a role at NBC Sports similar to that of Tom Brokaw, being an occasional special correspondent to the division. He explained that his decision "opens up more time to do the things that I feel I'm most connected to; there will still be events, features, and interviews where I can make a significant contribution at NBC, but it will also leave more time for baseball (on MLB Network), and then, at some point down the road, I'll have a chance to do more of the long-form programming I enjoy." Costas told USA Today his gradual retirement was planned in advance, and that he did not want to announce it during the 2016 Summer Olympics or the NFL season because it would be too disruptive, and joked: "I'm glad that Sochi wasn't the last one. You wouldn't want your pink-eye Olympics to be your last Olympics."

Costas's final major on-air broadcast for NBC was hosting the 2018 Belmont Stakes, where Justify won the Triple Crown.

On January 15, 2019, it was announced that Costas had officially departed from NBC Sports after 40 years.

On August 11, 2024, Costas made a rare guest appearance on NBC's coverage of the 2024 Summer Olympics for a segment previewing the 2028 Summer Olympics in Los Angeles, joining Tirico and Al Michaels in a discussion of notable moments from past Olympics hosted by the United States.

=== Talk show hosting ===
Costas hosted the syndicated radio program Costas Coast to Coast from 1986 to 1996, which was revived as Costas on the Radio. Costas on the Radio, which ended its three-year run on May 31, 2009, aired on 200 stations nationwide each weekend and syndicated by the Clear Channel–owned Premiere Radio Networks. During that period, Costas also served as the imaging voice of Clear Channel–owned KLOU in St. Louis, Missouri, during that station's period as "My 103.3". Like Later, Costas's radio shows have focused on a wide variety of topics and have not been limited to sports discussion.

Later with Bob Costas aired on NBC from 1988 to 1994. Costas decided to leave Later after six seasons, having grown tired of the commute to New York City from his home in St. Louis and wishing to lighten his workload in order to spend more time with his family. He also turned down an offer from David Letterman, who moved to CBS in 1995, to follow him there and become the first host of The Late Late Show, which was being developed by Letterman's company to air at 12:30 after the Late Show with David Letterman.

In June 2005, Costas was named by CNN president Jonathan Klein as a regular substitute anchor for Larry King's Larry King Live for one year. Costas, as well as Klein, made clear that Costas was not trying out for King's position on a permanent basis. Nancy Grace was also named a regular substitute host for the show. On August 18, 2005, Costas refused to host a Larry King Live broadcast where the subject was missing teenager Natalee Holloway. Costas said that because there were no new developments in the story, he felt it had no news value, and he was uncomfortable with television's drift in the direction of tabloid-type stories.

Beginning in October 2011, Costas was a correspondent for Rock Center with Brian Williams. He gained acclaim for his November 2011 live interview of former Pennsylvania State University assistant coach Jerry Sandusky concerning charges of sexual abuse of minors, in which Sandusky called in to deny the charges.

Costas hosted a monthly talk show Costas Tonight on NBC Sports Network.

=== HBO Sports ===
In 2001, Costas was hired by HBO to host a 12-week series called On the Record with Bob Costas.

In 2002, Costas began a stint as co-host of HBO's long-running series Inside the NFL. Costas remained host of Inside the NFL through the end of the 2007 NFL season. He hosted the show with Cris Collinsworth and former NFL legends Dan Marino and Cris Carter. The program aired each week during the NFL season.

Costas left HBO to sign with MLB Network in February 2009.

On April 23, 2021, it was announced that Costas would be returning to HBO to host a quarter-yearly interview show called Back on the Record.

=== MLB Network ===
At the channel's launch on January 1, 2009, Costas hosted the premiere episode of All Time Games, a presentation of the recently discovered kinescope of Game 5 of the 1956 World Series. During the episode, he held a forum with Don Larsen, who pitched MLB's only postseason perfect game during that game, and Yogi Berra, who caught the game.

Costas joined the network full-time on February 3, 2009. He hosted a regular interview show titled MLB Network Studio 42 with Bob Costas as well as special programming and provides play-by-play for select live baseball game telecasts. In 2017, Costas called Game 1 of the American League Division Series between the Boston Red Sox and the Houston Astros on MLB Network. The Astros went on to win 8–2. Costas and his color commentator Jim Kaat received criticism for their "bantering about minutia" and misidentification of plays. Costas also went on to become an internet meme after using the term the "sacks were juiced" to describe the bases being loaded.

=== NFL Network ===
As aforementioned, Costas hosted Thursday Night Football on NBC and NFL Network in 2016, having returned to broadcasting after a brief absence. He was replaced by Liam McHugh in 2017.

=== CNN and TNT Sports ===
In July 2020, it was announced that Costas would join CNN as a contributor. According to CNN, Costas would provide commentary "on a wide range of sports-related issues as the industry adapts to new challenges posed by the coronavirus and the frequent intersection of sports with larger societal issues." Costas, who would continue working on MLB Network, said of joining CNN: "CNN's willingness to devote time and attention to sports related topics, makes it a good fit for me."

On August 20, 2021, Andrew Marchand of the New York Post reported that TBS — a sister property via CNN parent WarnerMedia — was nearing an agreement with Costas which would have him hosting the network's National League Championship Series coverage. On October 7, 2021, Turner Sports announced that Costas would be joining TBS for their postseason baseball coverage starting on October 16.

As of the 2022 MLB season, Costas provided play-by-play for TBS's Tuesday night baseball package during the regular season. He was the studio host for TBS's ALCS postseason coverage and also provided play-by-play for TBS's ALDS postseason coverage between the Cleveland Guardians and New York Yankees. This marked the first time since the 2000 ALCS on NBC that Costas provided play-by-play for a postseason baseball series in its entirety.

Costas provided the play-by-play commentary on TBS for the 2024 American League Division Series between the New York Yankees and Kansas City Royals, receiving criticism for his monotonic delivery and perceived lack of interest in the events on the field. Following the series, Costas announced his retirement from calling MLB games.

=== Return to NBC Sports ===
In 2026, Costas announced he would return to NBC as the studio host for the network's new Sunday Night Baseball package and a contributor to NBC's NBA coverage.

=== Other appearances ===
Costas provided significant contributions to the Ken Burns, PBS miniseries Baseball as well as its follow-up The 10th Inning. He also appears in another PBS film, A Time for Champions, produced by St. Louis's Nine Network of Public Media.

== Interests ==
=== Love of baseball ===
Costas is a devoted baseball fan. He has been suggested as a potential commissioner and wrote Fair Ball: A Fan's Case for Baseball in 2000. For his 40th birthday, then Oakland Athletics manager Tony La Russa allowed Costas to manage the club during a spring training game. The first time Costas visited baseball legend Stan Musial's St. Louis eatery, he left a $3.31 tip on a ten dollar tab in homage to Musial's lifetime batting average (.331). Costas delivered the eulogy at Mickey Mantle's funeral. In eulogizing Mantle, Costas described the baseball legend as "a fragile hero to whom we had an emotional attachment so strong and lasting that it defied logic". Costas has even carried a 1958 Mickey Mantle baseball card in his wallet. Costas also delivered the eulogy for Musial after his death in early 2013.

Costas was outspoken about his disdain for Major League Baseball instituting a playoff wild card. Costas believed it diminishes the significance and drama of winning a divisional championship. He prefers a system in which winning the wild card puts a team at some sort of disadvantage, as opposed to an equal level with teams who outplayed them over a 162-game season. Or, as explained in his book Fair Ball, have only the three division winners in each league go to the postseason, with the team with the best record receiving a bye to the League Championship Series. Once, on the air on HBO's Inside the NFL, he mentioned that the NFL regular season counted for something, but baseball's was beginning to lose significance. With the advent of the second wild card, Costas has said he feels the format has improved, since there is now a greater premium placed on finishing first. He has suggested a further tweak: Make the wild card round a best two of three, instead of a single game, with all three games, if necessary, on the homefield of the wild card of the better record. This wild card format would eventually be instituted into the postseason starting with the 2022 season.

He also has disdained the Designated Hitter rule, saying baseball would be a better game without it.

Costas serves as a member of the advisory board of the Baseball Assistance Team, a 501(c)(3) non-profit organization dedicated to helping former Major League, Minor League, and Negro league players through financial and medical difficulties.

In 1993, Costas joined the ownership group of the Memphis Chicks of the Southern League of the minor league baseball system. The ownership group also consisted of Ron Howard, Maury Povich, and Congressman Steve Cohen.

=== Political views ===
Costas considers himself left of center but has said that he has voted for Republican candidates at times as well. On May 26, 2007, Costas discussed the presidency of George W. Bush on his radio show, stating he liked Bush personally, and had been optimistic about his presidency, but said the course of the Iraq War, and other mis-steps have led him to conclude Bush's presidency had "tragically failed" and considered it "overwhelmingly evident, even if you're a conservative Republican, if you're honest about it, this is a failed administration." The following summer, Costas interviewed Bush during the president's appearance at the 2008 Summer Olympics in Beijing.

== Controversies ==
=== Fastest man in the world ===
On August 1, 1996, the night of Michael Johnson's 200 m Olympic win, Costas stated on-air during Olympics coverage of the 1996 Olympics that Johnson's gold-medal performance in the 200 m (19.32 seconds) was faster than Donovan Bailey's 100 m performance (9.84 seconds) five days earlier in that 19.32 divided by two is 9.66. Bailey later dismissed Costas's comments as "a person who knew nothing about track talking about it with a lot of people listening"; nonetheless, the sportscaster's remarks touched a nerve.

The unofficial "world's fastest man" title typically goes to the Olympic 100 metre champion. The 200 metre time almost always yields a "faster" average speed than a 100-metre race time, since the initial slow speed at the start is amortized by the longer distance. In other words, the second 100 metres is run with a "flying start", without the slow acceleration phase of the first 100 metres and without the greater than 0.10 s reaction time of the start. In fact, each 200 metre gold medalist from 1968, when fully electronic timing was introduced, to 1996 had a "faster" average speed at the Olympics, save one, yet there had been no controversy over the title of "world's fastest man" previously, until Bob Costas's remarks during the 1996 Olympics.

Amid continuous verbal sparring between the pair of athletes, this led to an unsanctioned 150-metre race between Bailey and Johnson in Toronto, which Bailey won.

=== Gun culture controversy ===
During a segment on the Sunday Night Football halftime show on December 2, 2012, Costas paraphrased Fox Sports columnist Jason Whitlock in regard to Jovan Belcher's murder-suicide the day prior, saying the United States' gun culture was causing more domestic disputes to result in death, and that it was likely Belcher and his girlfriend would not have died had he not possessed a gun.

Critics interpreted his remarks as support for gun control. Many (including former Republican presidential candidates Mike Huckabee and Herman Cain) felt Costas should not have used a program typically viewed as entertainment to publicize political views on sensitive topics. Lou Dobbs criticized his remarks for supporting the abolition of the Second Amendment by quoting a sports writer, while Andrew Levy remarked that he had been given a civics lecture by someone who had "gotten rich thanks in part to a sport that destroys men's bodies and brains". However, reporter Erik Wemple of The Washington Post praised Costas for speaking out for gun control on the broadcast, commenting that the incident's connection to the NFL provided him with an obligation to acknowledge the incident during the halftime show, stating that "the things that [NFL players] do affect the public beyond whether their teams cover the point spread. And few cases better exemplify that dynamic as powerfully as the Belcher incident."

During the following week, Costas defended his remarks in an appearance on MSNBC's program The Last Word with Lawrence O'Donnell, where he said the remarks were related to the country's gun culture, and not about gun control as critics had inferred. Costas did suggest that more regulation be placed on America's gun culture:

Now, do I believe that we need more comprehensive and more sensible gun control legislation? Yes I do. That doesn't mean repeal the Second Amendment. That doesn't mean a prohibition on someone having a gun to protect their home and their family. It means sensible and more comprehensive gun control legislation. But even if you had that, you would still have the problem of what Jason Whitlock wrote about, and what I agree with. And that is a gun culture in this country.

=== 2014 Winter Olympics ===
During his coverage of the 2014 Winter Olympics, Costas was criticized by some conservative members of the media, including Michelle Malkin and Glenn Beck, for allegedly praising Russian president Vladimir Putin's role in defusing tensions surrounding Syria and Iran. Other conservative media commentators, including Bill O'Reilly and Bernard Goldberg, defended Costas's remarks as factually correct and pointed out that Costas had also voiced considerable criticism of both Russia and Putin while broadcasting from Sochi. During an interview on Fox News, Goldberg said "... the idea that Costas somehow portrayed Vladimir Putin as a benign figure is ridiculous." Costas defended himself on O'Reilly's broadcast on March 3, reiterating that he criticized Putin immediately preceding and following the statements that were questioned. O'Reilly then aired a portion of an Olympic commentary in which Costas was pointedly critical of the Russian leader. Costas also indicated that Senator John McCain, who had been among those who had initially criticized Costas, had called Costas to apologize after hearing the full segment in context.

=== Football's future ===
While visiting the University of Maryland in November 2017 for a roundtable discussion on various sports topics, Costas said the sport of football was in a decline, with evidence mounting that the repetition of concussions "destroys people's brains" and he would not allow a son with athletic talent to play it. Costas had been scheduled to work Super Bowl LII, his eighth as a host (despite stepping down from Football Night in America in favor of his successor Mike Tirico, Costas was to return while Tirico prepped to lead NBC's coverage of the 2018 Winter Olympics, set to begin a few days later). However, NBC announced shortly before the game that Liam McHugh would instead join Dan Patrick as a co-host, leading to speculation that NBC removed Costas from the NFL's biggest game over his comments. Costas originally denied such, saying it made more sense for McHugh, who had been hosting Thursday night games on NBC, to serve in that capacity. However, he later admitted in an interview with ESPN's Outside the Lines that the comments were indeed the basis of his removal, ultimately resulting in his departure from the network after forty years.

== Personal life ==
Costas was married from 1983 to 2001 to Carole "Randy" Randall Krummenacher. They had two children, son Keith (born 1986) and daughter Taylor (born 1989). Costas once jokingly promised Minnesota Twins center fielder Kirby Puckett that, if he was batting over .350 by the time his child was born, he would name the baby Kirby. Kirby was hitting better than .350, but Bob's son initially was not given a first (or second) name of Kirby. After Puckett reminded Costas of the agreement, the birth certificate was changed to "Keith Michael Kirby Costas".

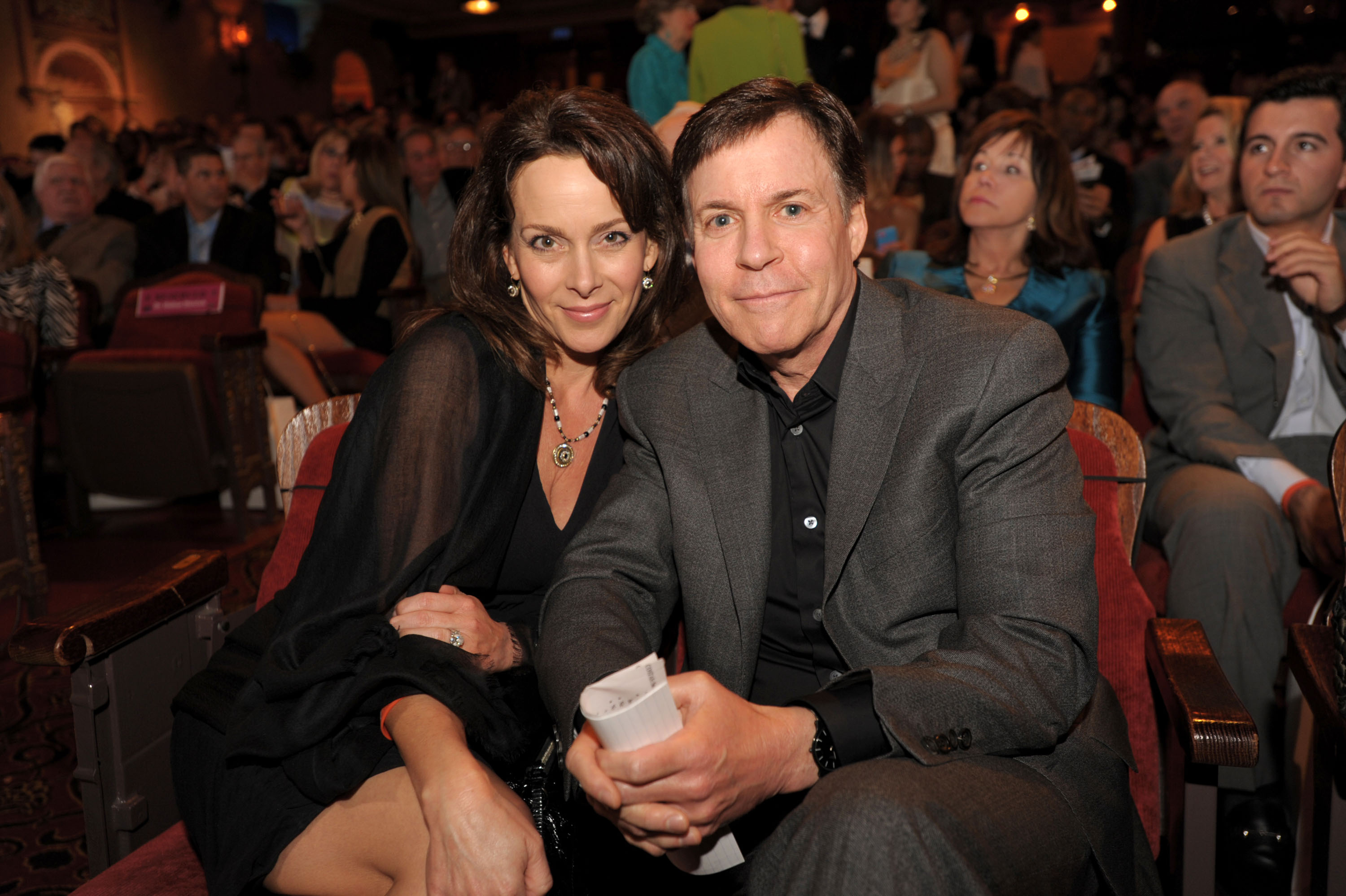
Costas and Jill Sutton at the 2014 Miami International Film Festival

On March 12, 2004, Costas married his second wife, Jill Sutton. Costas and his wife now reside primarily in Newport Beach, California. Although Costas was born and raised in the New York area, he has often said he thinks of St. Louis as his hometown.

Costas's children have also won Sports Emmys: Keith has won two as an associate producer on MLB Network's MLB Tonight, and Taylor as an associate producer on NBC's coverage of the 2012 Summer Olympics.

== Awards and honors ==
- 29-time Emmy Award winner (the only person in television history to have won Emmys for sports, news and entertainment)
- Eight-time NSMA National Sportscaster of the Year
- Four-time American Sportscasters Association Sportscaster of the Year
- Star on the St. Louis Walk of Fame.
- 1999 Curt Gowdy Media Award – Basketball Hall of Fame
- 2000 TV Guide Award for Favorite Sportscaster.
- 2001 George Arents Award from Syracuse University (Excellence in Sports Broadcasting)
- 2004 Dick Schaap Award for Outstanding Journalism
- NSMA Hall of Fame inductee (class of 2012).
- 2012 Walter Cronkite Award for Excellence in Journalism.
- 2013 S.I. Newhouse School of Public Communications Marty Glickman Award for Leadership in Sports Media.
- 2015 WAER Hall of Fame inductee
- 2017 Ford C. Frick Award – National Baseball Hall of Fame.
- 2018 Sports Broadcasting Hall of Fame inductee
- 2019 Suffolk Sports Hall of Fame inductee

== In popular culture ==
=== Films ===
In 1994, Costas appeared as the play-by-play announcer for the World Series (working alongside Tim McCarver) in the movie The Scout. In 1998, he appeared as himself along with his rival/counterpart Al Michaels from ABC in the movie BASEketball. Costas voiced an animated car version of himself named Bob Cutlass in the movies Cars (2006) and Cars 3 (2017). He also appeared as himself in the 2001 movie Pootie Tang, where he remarks that he saw "the longest damn clip ever".

Costas's voice appeared in the 2011 documentary film Legendary: When Baseball Came to the Bluegrass, which detailed the humble beginnings of the Lexington Legends, a minor league baseball team located in Lexington, Kentucky.

In 2021, Costas played himself in Here Today directed by Billy Crystal.

In the 2026 David O. Russel film Madden, Costas was portrayed by Connor Price.

=== Popular culture ===
Costas has been alluded to several times in popular music. The songs "Mafioso" by Mac Dre, "We Major" by Domo Genesis and "The Last Huzzah" by Mr. Muthafuckin' eXquire, all refer to Costas. He was also mentioned in a Ludacris song after Costas mentioned the rapper on the late night talk show Last Call with Carson Daly.

In June 2013, Costas provided the voice of God in the Monty Python musical Spamalot at The Muny Repertory in St. Louis.

=== Television guest roles ===
Apart from his normal sportscasting duties, Costas has also presented periodic sports blooper reels, and announced dogsled and elevator races, on Late Night with David Letterman.

In 1985, Costas appeared on The War to Settle the Score, a pre-WrestleMania program that the World Wrestling Federation aired on MTV.

In 1993, Costas hosted the "pregame" show for the final episode of Cheers. Costas once appeared on the television program NewsRadio as himself. He hosted an award show and later had some humorous encounters with the crew of WNYX. He also had a recurring guest role as himself on the HBO series Arli$$.

Costas has been impersonated several times by Darrell Hammond on Saturday Night Live. Costas was "supposed" to appear in the fourth-season premiere of Celebrity Deathmatch (ironically titled "Where is Bob Costas?") as a guest-commentator, but about halfway through the episode it was revealed that John Tesh had killed him before the show to take his place. This was likely in response for Tesh not being invited back to NBC for its gymnastics coverage at the 2000 Olympics.

In 1999, Costas appeared as a guest on Space Ghost Coast to Coast during its sixth season.

On June 13, 2008, Costas appeared on MSNBC's commercial-free special coverage of Remembering Tim Russert (1950–2008).

On January 30, 2009, Costas guest-starred as himself on the television series Monk in an episode titled "Mr. Monk Makes the Playoffs"'. He mentions to Captain Stottlemeyer about how Adrian Monk once helped him out of a problem several years ago with regards to a demented cat salesman. He apparently sold Costas a cat that allegedly tried to kill him with a squeeze toy. (In fact when he signs off he says, "The cat was definitely trying to kill me.")

Costas guest-voiced as himself in 2010 Simpsons episode, "Boy Meets Curl", when Homer and Marge make the U.S. Olympic curling team. Costas also guest-voiced as himself on the Family Guy episode "Turban Cowboy" in an interview with Peter after he wins the Boston Marathon by hitting everyone with his car.

On February 11, 2010, Stephen Colbert jokingly expressed his desire to stab Costas with an ice pick at the upcoming 2010 Winter Olympics in Vancouver so Colbert could take over as host. Costas later made a cameo appearance on the February 25, 2010, edition of Colbert's show.

In January 2013, Costas appeared as himself in the Go On episode "Win at All Costas" with Matthew Perry, wherein Ryan King auditions with him for a TV show.

Real footage of Costas from NBC's pregame show before Game 5 of the 1994 NBA Finals was used in the second episode of The People v. O.J. Simpson: American Crime Story.

Costas appeared on the September 22, 2017, episode of Real Time with Bill Maher to discuss issues such as concussions and the role of political activism in professional sports (namely by Colin Kaepernick).

=== Video games ===
In 2002, Costas was the play-by-play announcer, alongside Harold Reynolds, for Triple Play 2002 for PlayStation 2 and Xbox.

== Career timeline ==
=== Baseball ===
Year	Title	Role	Network
1983–1989	MLB on NBC	#2 play-by-play	NBC
1994–2000	MLB on NBC	Play-by-play (lead)	NBC
2026–present	MLB on NBC	Studio host	NBC
2017–present	MLB Postseason	Play-by-play	MLB Network
2021–2022	MLB on TBS	studio host (2021 NLCS/2022 ALCS)	TBS
2022–2024	MLB on TBS	Play-by-play (lead)	TBS

=== Basketball ===
Year	Title	Role	Network
1979–1980	Chicago Bulls	Play-by-play	WGN-TV
1990–1997; 2002	NBA on NBC	Studio host	NBC
1997–2000	NBA on NBC	Play-by-play (lead)	NBC
2025–present	NBA on NBC	Contributor	NBC

=== Football ===
Year	Title	Role	Network
1976–1979	NFL on CBS	Play-by-play	CBS
1980–1983	NFL on NBC	Play-by-play	NBC
1984–1992; 2006–2016	NFL on NBC	Studio Host	NBC
1993	Notre Dame Football on NBC	Studio host (alternate)	NBC
2002–2008	Inside the NFL	Host	HBO
2016	Thursday Night Football	Host	NBC

=== Talk show ===
Year	Title	Role	Network
1988–1994	Later	Host	NBC

- 1974–1976: Spirits of St. Louis Play-by-play, KMOX radio
- 1976–1981: Missouri Tigers men's basketball Play-by-play, KMOX radio
- 1980–2018: NBC Sports Play-by-play & studio host
- 1992–2016: Summer Olympics Primetime Host
- 2001–2018: Thoroughbred Racing on NBC Lead host
- 2001–2009: On the Record with Bob Costas and Costas Now Host
- 2002–2014: Winter Olympics Primetime Host
- 2003–2014: U.S. Open host, NBC Sports
- 2008–2012: NHL Winter Classic Host
- 2009–present: MLB Network Studio 42 with Bob Costas Host (2009–2014), Thursday Night Baseball Play-by-play
- 2020–2026: CNN Sports contributor

== See also ==
- New Yorkers in journalism

== Notes ==
Preceded by Len Berman; Greg Gumbel (in 1997)	Studio host, NFL on NBC; 1984–1992; 2006–2016	Succeeded by Jim Lampley; Mike Tirico
Preceded by none	Studio host, NBA Showtime; 1990–1997	Succeeded by Hannah Storm
Preceded by Bryant Gumbel	American television prime time anchor, Summer Olympic Games; 1992–2016	Succeeded by Mike Tirico
Preceded by Sean McDonough	World Series network television play-by-play announcer (with Al Michaels in 1995 and concurrent with Joe Buck in odd numbered years); 1995–1999	Succeeded by Joe Buck
Preceded by Marv Albert	Play-by-play announcer, NBA Finals; 1998–2000	Succeeded by Marv Albert
Preceded by Jim Nantz	American television prime time anchor, Winter Olympic Games; 2002–2014	Succeeded by Mike Tirico
Preceded by Vin Scully (in 1989)	Lead play-by-play announcer, Major League Baseball on NBC; 1994–2000	Succeeded by Jason Benetti (in 2022)
Preceded by Merle Harmon	Secondary play-by-play announcer, Major League Baseball Game of the Week; 1982–1989	Succeeded by Dick Stockton
