= Shinnecock Hills Golf Club =

Golf club in New York, US

Shinnecock Hills G.C.

- Location within the United States Location within New York
- 40.894°N 72.440°W

Club information
- Location: Southampton, New York, U.S.
- Elevation: 20–90 feet (6–27 m)
- Established: 1891; 135 years ago
- Type: Private Club
- Total holes: 18
- Tournaments: U.S. Open (6), Walker Cup, U.S. Amateur, U.S. Women's Amateur, U.S. Senior Amateur
- Website: shinnecockhillsgolfclub.org
- Designed by: William Flynn (golfer) (1931); C. B. MacDonald (1901); Willie Dunn (1894); Willie Davis (1891); Bill Coore & Ben Crenshaw (2013 renovation)
- Par: 70
- Length: 6,940 yards (6,346 m) (red); 7,440 yards (6,800 m) (2026 U.S. Open)
- Course rating: 74.7
- Slope rating: 145
- Shinnecock Hills Golf Club
- U.S. National Register of Historic Places
- Nearest city: Southampton, New York
- Area: 259 acres (105 ha)
- Built: 1892
- Architect: McKim, Mead & White; et al.
- Architectural style: Shingle style architecture
- NRHP reference No.: 00001211
- Added to NRHP: September 29, 2000
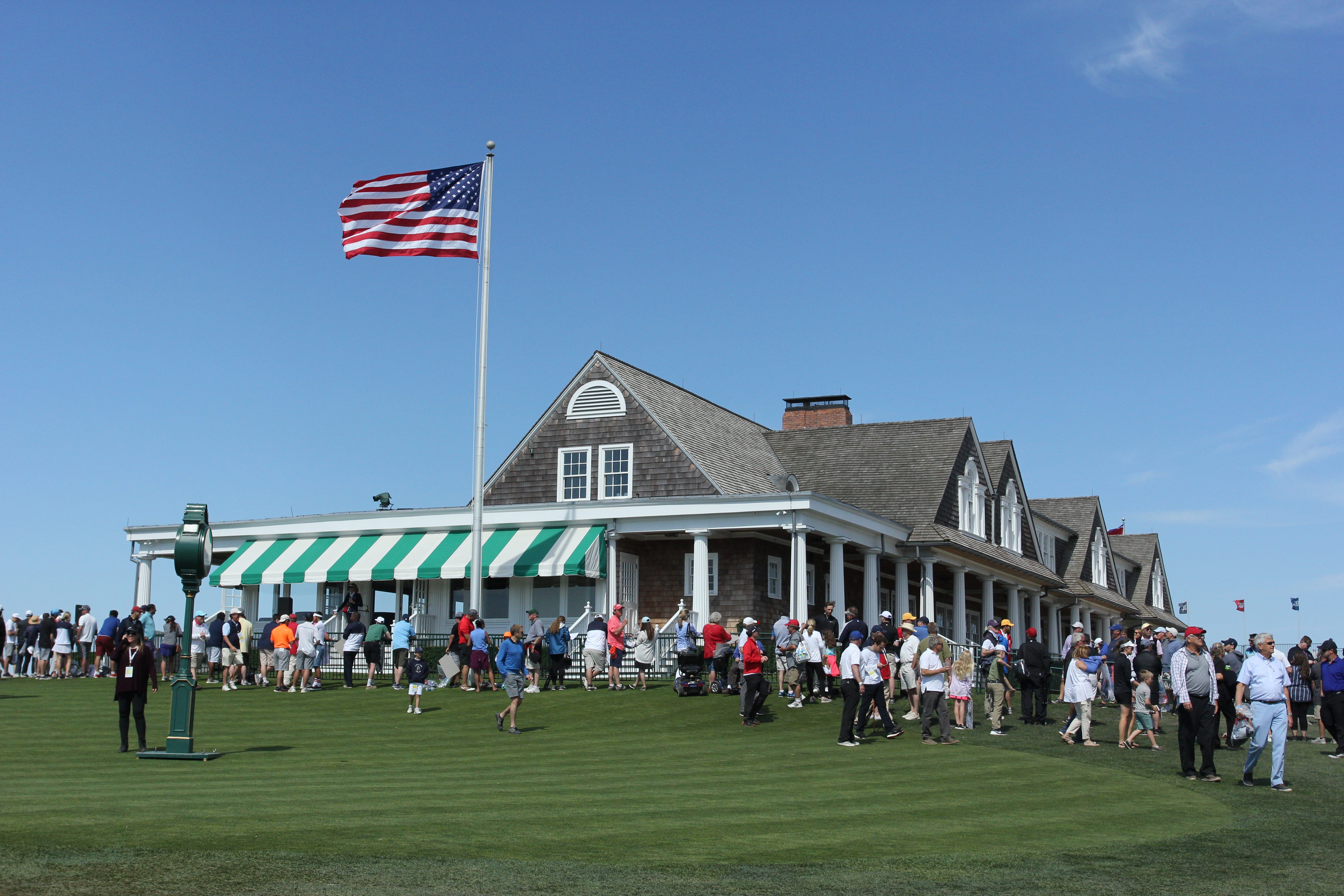
- Clubhouse at the 2018 U.S. Open

Shinnecock Hills Golf Club is a links-style golf club located in the Shinnecock Hills section of Southampton, New York on Long Island, situated between the Peconic Bay and the Atlantic Ocean. Founded in 1891, it is one of the oldest golf clubs in the United States and was among the five charter clubs that formed the United States Golf Association (USGA) in 1894. Shinnecock Hills also built what is often cited as the first golf clubhouse in the U.S., designed by McKim, Mead & White and opened in 1892. From its inception, the club notably admitted women members—one of the first American golf clubs to do so.

Renowned for its William Flynn–designed course (1931) and subsequent restorations, Shinnecock Hills has hosted numerous major championships, including six U.S. Opens, most recently in 2026, and is scheduled to host the Men's and Women's Open in 2036. In 2000, it was added to the National Register of Historic Places. It is routinely ranked as one of the greatest golf courses in the world.

== History ==
=== Founding and early years (1891–1900) ===
Shinnecock Hills Golf Club was established in 1891 by a group of wealthy New Yorkers led by William K. Vanderbilt, Edward Meade, and Duncan Cryder, who purchased an 80 acres (32 ha) parcel for $2,500. Today, that land alone is worth hundreds of millions of dollars due to scarcity and desirability. The club is widely believed to be the oldest incorporated golf club in the United States; it also claims to have the oldest golf clubhouse in the U.S. (1892). From day one, Shinnecock admitted women members—a rare stance in the 19th century—and even built a separate nine-hole ladies' course.

Willie Davis, a professional from the Royal Montreal Club, designed the original 12-hole layout in 1891, aided by over 100 members of the local Shinnecock Indian Nation who helped clear the sandy terrain. In 1892, a Stanford White–designed clubhouse was constructed, often cited as the first purpose-built golf clubhouse in America.

By 1894, Scottish professional Willie Dunn Jr. expanded the course to 18 holes. In the same year, Shinnecock became one of the five founding member clubs of the USGA. The club hosted the second U.S. Open on a then–5,000 yards (4,572 m) course. That championship was notable for including John Shippen (the first African-American golf professional) and Oscar Bunn (a Shinnecock Indian), breaking racial barriers despite an attempted boycott by some British professionals. Shinnecock also hosted the 1900 U.S. Women’s Amateur, reflecting its early commitment to women’s golf.

=== Early redesigns (1901–1916) ===
In 1901, Charles B. Macdonald and Seth Raynor redesigned and lengthened the course, integrating some of Dunn’s original holes while introducing strategic principles that were popular in the early 20th century. Their version brought features such as “template holes” (e.g., Redan, Eden, Short) inspired by British links. However, portions of this Macdonald–Raynor layout would eventually be supplanted when the club expanded its property and enlisted William Flynn in the late 1920s.

=== William Flynn's major redesign (1931) ===
By 1930, Shinnecock faced a highway extension (later Route 27) that would have bisected its course. The club acquired new land to the north and commissioned William S. Flynn to design a completely new 18-hole routing, which opened in 1931. Flynn is considered the principal architect of the modern Shinnecock Hills course. He preserved a few ideas from the prior Macdonald layout but largely created a new routing that took full advantage of the rolling, sandy terrain.

Flynn’s design emphasized strategic options, wind exposure (with holes oriented in multiple directions), and natural landforms. The course measured over 6,900 yards at a time when that was unusually long. Except for minor lengthening and periodic updates, the 1931 Flynn routing is effectively the same layout played today.

=== Modern era and restoration ===
Shinnecock underwent typical mid-century changes—some tree plantings, narrower fairways, and new turf grasses. Controversy arose at the 2004 U.S. Open when extremely dry conditions and firm greens (notably the par-3 7th) caused portions of the course to become "unplayable."

In the 2010s, Shinnecock commenced an extensive restoration, led by architects Bill Coore and Ben Crenshaw, aiming to return the course closer to Flynn’s original vision. This project involved removing many trees, widening fairways, restoring fescue roughs, and expanding certain greens to recapture lost pin positions. By the 2018 U.S. Open, the course played firm and fast, though the USGA did slightly narrow some fairway edges before the event. Brooks Koepka repeated as U.S. Open champion that year, highlighting Shinnecock's enduring challenge for modern pros.

Shinnecock Hills is known for its historic character and course design. It has hosted the U.S. Open six times (1896, 1986, 1995, 2004, 2018, and 2026) and is scheduled to host the tournament again in 2036.

=== Shinnecock Indian Nation and the club ===
Shinnecock Hills derives its name from the Shinnecock Indian Nation, who lived on these lands long before European settlement. Tribe members built the early holes in 1891, and local teenagers Oscar Bunn and John Shippen both became part of golf history at the 1896 U.S. Open. In subsequent generations, however, disputes arose over land rights. The tribe has challenged the 1859 sale of its territory, alleging it was taken illegally. While federal courts dismissed the lawsuit, tensions have persisted regarding ancestral burial grounds and use of tribal lands.

Despite these complexities, recent efforts by the club and the USGA have aimed to recognize the tribe’s role. The USGA established the “Oscar Bunn Golf Facility” to introduce golf to Shinnecock youth, and there is ongoing dialogue over the cultural significance of the region.

== Architecture and notable holes ==
Shinnecock Hills is often described as a true “links-style” course, built on sandy, rolling terrain with few trees. The design includes several celebrated holes:

- 7th hole – “Redan” (par 3): Modeled after the famous Redan at North Berwick, this hole features an angled green sloping sharply front-right to back-left, guarded by deep bunkers and heavily influenced by crosswinds.
- 9th hole – “Ben Nevis” (par 4): A demanding uphill hole playing around 485 yards to a green perched near the clubhouse. Its steep ascent often requires a long second shot into prevailing winds.
- 11th hole – “Hill Head” (par 3): Only about 155–160 yards, but with an elevated, well-bunkered green. Under firm or windy conditions, it can play notoriously difficult despite its short yardage.
- 14th hole – “Thom’s Elbow” (par 4): A formidable long par 4 (restored to around 519 yards for championships). Strategically contoured with bunkers that reward driving close to trouble for a better angle.
- 16th hole – “Shinnecock” (par 5): Over 600 yards from the back tee, offering a late risk-reward chance. Elevated approaches and well-placed bunkers can turn hopeful birdies into bogeys.
- 18th hole – “Home” (par 4): A classic uphill finisher around 450 yards, with the iconic Stanford White–designed clubhouse beyond the green. Often decisive in U.S. Open play (e.g., Corey Pavin’s famed 4-wood approach in 1995).

The overall routing by Flynn showcases multiple wind directions, offset angles from tee to green, and natural bunkering. Wide fairways encourage strategic angles, while firm, undulating greens demand precise approaches.

== Notable events hosted ==
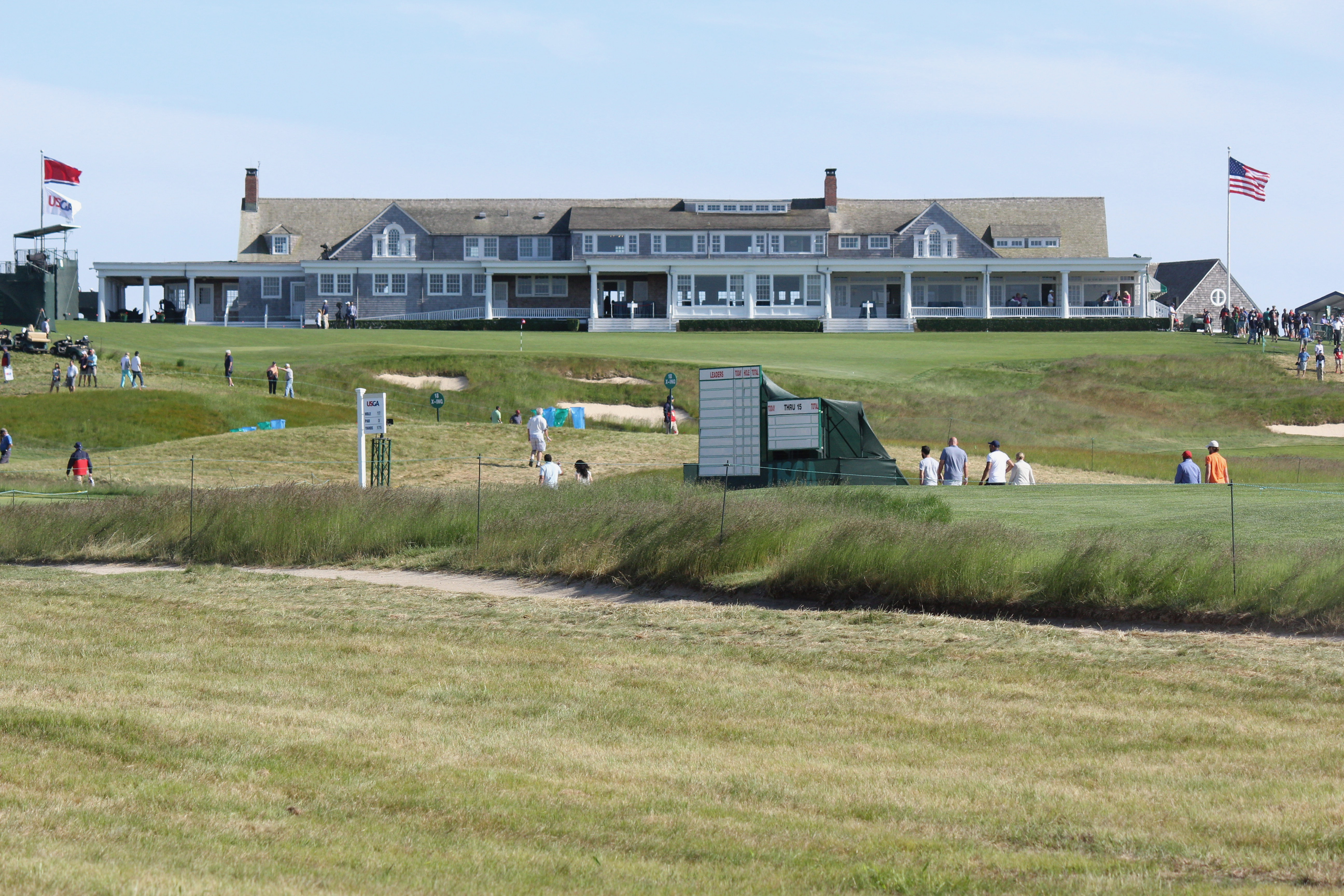
The Stanford White–designed clubhouse, as viewed from the 16th hole.

Year	Event	Winner	Total	To par	Margin of victory	Runner(s)-up	Winner's share ($)
2026	U.S. Open (6)	(United States) Wyndham Clark	276	−4	1 stroke	(United States) Sam Burns	4,500,000
2018	U.S. Open (5)	(United States) Brooks Koepka	281	+1	1 stroke	(England) Tommy Fleetwood	2,160,000
2004	U.S. Open (4)	(South Africa) Retief Goosen	276	−4	2 strokes	(United States) Phil Mickelson	1,125,000
1995	U.S. Open (3)	(United States) Corey Pavin	280	E	2 strokes	(Australia) Greg Norman	350,000
1986	U.S. Open (2)	(United States) Raymond Floyd	279	−1	2 strokes	(United States) Chip Beck (United States) Lanny Wadkins	115,000
1977	Walker Cup	United States	24 matches		16 to 8	(United Kingdom) Great Britain & (Republic of Ireland) Ireland	—
1967	U.S. Senior Amateur	(United States) Ray Palmer	match play		3 & 2	(United States) Walter D. Bronson	—
1900	U.S. Women's Amateur	(United States) Frances Griscom	match play		6 & 5	(United States) Margaret Curtis	—
1896	U.S. Open	(Scotland) James Foulis	152	—	3 strokes	(England) Horace Rawlins	150
1896	U.S. Amateur	(Scotland) H. J. Whigham	match play		8 & 7	(United States) Joseph G. Thorp	—

== Future scheduled majors ==
- 2036 U.S. Open
- 2036 U.S. Women's Open

== Scorecard ==
Hole	Name	Yards	Par	Hole	Name	Yards	Par
1	Westward Ho	399	4	10	Eastward Ho	415	4
2	Plateau	252	3	11	Hill Head	159	3
3	Peconic	500	4	12	Tuckahoe	469	4
4	Pump House	475	4	13	Road Side	374	4
5	Montauk	589	5	14	Thom's Elbow	519	4
6	Pond	491	4	15	Sebonac	409	4
7	Redan	189	3	16	Shinnecock	616	5
8	Lowlands	439	4	17	Eden	175	3
9	Ben Nevis	485	4	18	Home	485	4
Out		3,819	35	In		3,621	35
				Total		7,440	70

Shinnecock Hills Golf Club
Tee	Rating/Slope	1	2	3	4	5	6	7	8	9	Out	10	11	12	13	14	15	16	17	18	In	Total
2026 U.S. Open	76.9 / 146	394	252	501	476	592	495	187	440	482	3,819	415	157	469	371	520	409	614	176	490	3,621	7,440
Red	74.7 / 145	399	220	469	409	537	453	189	394	435	3,505	415	159	469	374	463	409	540	180	426	3,435	6,940
Green	72.5 / 140	388	197	440	378	500	418	178	354	410	3,263	406	150	427	360	445	400	512	167	400	3,267	6,530
Blue	M:70.8 / 135 W:76.9 / 145	387	187	410	367	488	375	166	320	379	3,079	400	144	399	350	436	355	464	142	372	3,062	6,141
White	M:67.4 / 128 W:72.8 / 135	373	159	390	303	415	362	136	285	307	2,730	340	121	396	325	361	288	406	140	289	2666	5,396
Par		4	3	4	4	5	4	3	4	4	35	4	3	4	4	4	4	5	3	4	35	70

== See also ==
- National Golf Links of America (adjacent to Shinnecock Hills)
- John Shippen
