= Golf on Fox =

- Genre: American golf telecasts
- Presented by: Various commentators
- Opening theme: "USGA" by Brian Tyler (2015–2019)
- Country of origin: United States
- Original language: English
- No. of seasons: 10

Production
- Production location: Various tournament sites
- Camera setup: Multi-camera
- Running time: 390 minutes or until tournament ends (U.S. Open including advertisements) 210 minutes or until tournament ends (Other events including advertisements)
- Production company: Fox Sports

Original release
- Network: FSN
- Release: 2011
- Network: Fox
- Release: 2014 – 2020
- Release: 2025 – present

Golf coverage on Fox Sports properties have occurred occasionally since 1999. From 1999 through 2002, its regional sports network group Fox Sports Networks (FSN) sub-licensed early-round coverage of PGA Tour events from Golf Channel (a network in which Fox was an early investor).

From 2015 to June 2020, Fox served as the broadcaster of the national open tournaments and amateur championships of the United States Golf Association (USGA), including the U.S. Open — one of the four Men's major golf championships, under a 12-year deal. Coverage aired on the Fox broadcast network, Fox Sports 1, Fox Sports 2 and Fox Deportes. In late-June 2020, however, Fox announced that it would opt out of the contract, and sell the remainder to former USGA broadcast television rightsholder NBC Sports.

Golf coverage returned to Fox in 2025 after the broadcaster reached an agreement with LIV Golf.

== Background ==
=== Early Fox Sports golf involvement ===
Fox Sports partnered with Greg Norman in the early 1990s to create the World Golf Tour, which would have consisted of six events televised on Fox. However, the proposed events were met with legal issues (including a threat by PGA Tour commissioner Tim Finchem to suspend any golfer who participates). In 1996, Fox acquired a minority stake in Golf Channel.

Fox Sports bid for a portion of the PGA Tour's television rights starting in 1999. Although it did not gain the broadcast package (which was divided among the Big Three networks), Golf Channel would simulcast its early-round coverage on Fox's regional sports networks group Fox Sports Networks, as they had wider carriage. These simulcasts ended after 2002, when the PGA Tour's cable rights were acquired by ESPN and USA Network. Fox had also sold its minority stakes in Golf Channel and Outdoor Life Network to Comcast, as part of a transaction that saw Fox acquire Comcast's stakes in Speedvision.

In 2011, Fox Sports gained the rights to the CVS Caremark Charity Classic, which is an unofficial money event on the PGA Tour, and had been previously televised by Golf Channel. The coverage aired on Fox Sports Net, with Kraig Kann hosting. Fox did not renew its rights for 2012.

=== USGA coverage ===
Fox USGA logo (2015–2019)

On August 6, 2013, Fox Sports announced a 12-year, $1.1 billion deal to broadcast the open tournaments and amateur championships of the USGA, including the U.S. Open, U.S. Senior Open, and U.S. Women's Open, beginning in 2015. Fox would replace NBC and ESPN as the rightsholders of the events. NBC's lead analyst Johnny Miller expressed disappointment at the loss, saying that he "had a feeling" NBC would not retain rights, and that Fox would not be able to "fall out of a tree and do the U.S. Open."

As a prelude to the new package, Fox televised the 2014 Franklin Templeton Shootout, debuting its lead commentary team of Joe Buck and Greg Norman. Fox's first U.S. Open had a total of 38.5 hours of coverage, with 22 on Thursday and Friday, and 16.5 hours on Saturday and Sunday; the Fox Sports 1 cable network had a total of 16 hours of coverage on Thursday and Friday. The Fox broadcast network had a total of 22.5 hours of coverage Thursday through Sunday, with six hours Thursday and Friday, and 16.5 hours Saturday and Sunday. Fox utilized a number of new technologies during its production, including drone flyovers, a camera-equipped RC car for ground perspectives, and new graphics—including a live shot tracer, an augmented reality display of green contours, and a persistent top-5 leaderboard displayed in the bottom-right of the screen.

Fox's coverage received mixed reviews by critics and viewers, noting technical issues with on-air graphics during early coverage of the first round, on-air personnel (including the chemistry between Buck and Norman, and use of NFL reporters such as Curt Menefee), and missed shots due to poor camera angles or other on-air segments, although Buck did receive positive reviews by some, as well as Fox's technical innovations.

In the lead-up to the 2016 U.S. Open, Norman was dismissed by Fox, and replaced by Paul Azinger.

==== End of coverage ====
On June 29, 2020, it was announced that Fox Sports had opted out of the remaining seven years of its contract to cover USGA events, and had sold the remainder of the contract to NBC Sports. The rescheduling of the 2020 U.S. Open to September due to the COVID-19 pandemic had caused conflicts with Fox's football coverage, and the USGA forbade Fox from carrying the event exclusively on cable. While Fox discussed the possibility of partnering with NBC on the 2020 tournament, this eventually "led to a broader conversation and eventual agreement for NBCUniversal to take over the USGA media rights".

=== LIV Golf coverage ===
Due to being the only one of the four major networks that does not have any ties to the PGA Tour's media rights, Fox was anticipated as a potential US broadcaster for LIV Golf—a Saudi-backed golf competition also led by Norman; in September 2022, Golfweek reported that LIV was reaching a time-buy agreement to carry its events on Fox Sports 1. However, LIV denied the reports, and ultimately signed with Nexstar Media Group and The CW in 2023. The agreement would run through the 2024 LIV Golf League.

In January 2025, Fox announced an exclusive rights agreement with LIV Golf. Half of the events will air on Fox or Fox Sports 1, with the remainder on Fox Sports 2, Fox Business Network or the Fox Sports app. Fox utilizes the world feed produced by LIV Golf, featuring its in-house commentary team of Arlo White, former CBS and NBC analyst David Feherty, and former Golf Channel analyst Jerry Foltz.

== Theme music ==
Fox did not carry over "In Celebration of Man", the Yanni-composed music that had been used by NBC for its U.S. Open coverage, choosing to commission film composer Brian Tyler to compose new music (after acquiring rights to The Open Championship beginning in 2016, NBC instated an updated version of "In Celebration of Man" as its theme music for the tournament). Tyler explained that his composition was intended to "capture the epic struggle, the challenge, the history, the heartbreak, and the elation of competitive golf," and acknowledged that "Sports and music have always had an important connection for me. I love the way iconic sports themes evoke the spirit of sporting events and can provide dramatic impact and nostalgic memory."

== Commentators ==
On April 23, 2014, Fox Sports announced that Greg Norman would join Joe Buck as its lead golf commentary team. Buck and Norman worked together for the first time at the 2014 U.S. Open, where Fox produced studio programming that aired against ESPN and NBC's studio shows.

=== 2015 U.S. Open ===
On November 18, 2014, in advance of its coverage of the Franklin Templeton Shootout, Fox announced the full layout of its golf team.

- Booth announcers: Joe Buck, Greg Norman
- Tower announcers: Brad Faxon, Corey Pavin, Tom Weiskopf
- On-course reporters: Juli Inkster, Steve Flesch, Scott McCarron, Charles Davis, Jay Delsing
- Rules analyst: David Fay
- Course design analyst: Gil Hanse
- Studio Host: Curt Menefee
- Interviews: Holly Sonders
- Essays: Shane O'Donoghue
- Featured Group: Tim Brando, Mark Brooks, Natalie Gulbis, Buddy Marucci
- U.S. Open 360: Joel Klatt, Joe Ogilvie, Morgan Pressel, EA Tischler

=== 2016 U.S. Open ===
In January 2016, Greg Norman was let go by Fox in response to poor reception towards his performance during the U.S. Open, and was replaced by former ESPN analyst Paul Azinger. The network's 2016 U.S. Open team:

- Booth announcers: Joe Buck, Paul Azinger, Brad Faxon
- Tower announcers: Mark Brooks, Steve Flesch
- On-course reporters: Curtis Strange, Juli Inkster, Scott McCarron, Ken Brown
- Rules analyst: David Fay
- Course design analyst: Gil Hanse
- Studio Host: Holly Sonders
- Interviews: Shane Bacon
- Essays: Shane O'Donoghue
- Featured Groups Hosts: Joel Klatt, Justin Kutcher
- Featured Groups Analysts: Luke Elvy, Olin Browne, Brett Quigley, Scott Simpson

=== 2017 U.S. Open ===
In 2017, Fox made several changes to the commentator team:

- Lead announcers: Joe Buck, Paul Azinger, Brad Faxon
- Tower announcers: Shane O'Donoghue, Darren Clarke
- On-course reporters: Curtis Strange, Steve Flesch, Juli Inkster, Ken Brown
- Rules analyst: David Fay
- Course design analyst: Gil Hanse
- Studio Host: Holly Sonders
- Interviews: Shane Bacon

=== 2018 U.S. Open ===
For the 2018 U.S. Open, Fox announced that they would be splitting their lead commentary booths into two teams. This was done in an effort to avoid the occasional logjam caused by a three-man booth, which had been Joe Buck with analysts Paul Azinger and Brad Faxon. Therefore, Azinger would now be paired with Buck, and Faxon would be paired alongside Shane Bacon.

- Lead announcers: Joe Buck, Paul Azinger
- Secondary announcers: Shane Bacon, Brad Faxon
- On-course reporters: Curtis Strange, Steve Flesch, Ken Brown & Brett Quigley
- Rules analyst: David Fay
- Course design analyst: Gil Hanse
- Studio Host: Holly Sonders
- Interviews: Shane O'Donoghue

=== 2019 U.S. Open ===
- Lead announcers: Joe Buck, Paul Azinger
- Secondary announcers: Shane Bacon, Brad Faxon
- On-course reporters: Curtis Strange, Steve Flesch, Ken Brown & Brett Quigley
- Rules analyst: David Fay
- Course design analyst: Gil Hanse
- Interviews: Joel Klatt

Records
Preceded by NBC	U.S. Open network television broadcaster 2015–2019	Succeeded by NBC
Preceded by The CW	LIV Golf television broadcaster 2025–present	Succeeded by Incumbent
