= 1998 U.S. Open (golf) =

Coordinates: 37.709°N 122.495°W

Tournament information
- Dates: June 18–21, 1998
- Location: San Francisco, California
- Course(s): Olympic Club, Lake Course
- Organized by: USGA
- Tour(s): PGA Tour; European Tour; Japan Golf Tour

Statistics
- Par: 70
- Length: 6,797 yards (6,215 m)
- Field: 155 players, 60 after cut
- Cut: 147 (+7)
- Prize fund: $3,000,000
- Winner's share: $535,000

Champion
- (United States) Lee Janzen
- 280 (E)

Location in the United States
Location in California

The 1998 United States Open Championship was the 98th U.S. Open, held June 18–21 at the Lake Course of the Olympic Club in San Francisco, California. Lee Janzen won his second U.S. Open, one stroke ahead of runner-up Payne Stewart. Janzen became the second winner at a U.S. Open at the Olympic Club to come back from seven strokes behind in the final round; Billy Casper also did it in 1966, but on the back nine alone. Stewart rebounded and won the title the next year at Pinehurst, but died four months later in an aviation accident.

Four-time champion Jack Nicklaus, age 58, made the 36-hole cut at the U.S. Open for the final time.

This was the fourth U.S. Open at the Lake Course of the Olympic Club; the first two in 1955 and 1966 ended in playoffs, and 1987 was a one-stroke victory. The U.S. Open returned in 2012, also won by one stroke.

== Course layout ==
Lake Course

Hole	1	2	3	4	5	6	7	8	9	Out	10	11	12	13	14	15	16	17	18	In	Total
Yards	533	394	223	438	457	437	288	137	433	3,340	422	430	416	186	422	157	609	468	347	3,457	6,797
Par	5	4	3	4	4	4	4	3	4	35	4	4	4	3	4	3	5	4	4	35	70

Lengths of the course for previous major championships:

- 6,709 yards (6,135 m), par 70 - 1987 U.S. Open
- 6,719 yards (6,144 m), par 70 - 1966 U.S. Open
- 6,700 yards (6,126 m), par 70 - 1955 U.S. Open

== Round summaries ==
=== First round ===
Thursday, June 18, 1998

Place	Player	Score	To par
1	(United States) Payne Stewart	66	−4
2	(United States) Mark Carnevale	67	−3
T3	(United States) Joe Durant	68	−2
T3	(United States) Tom Lehman	68	−2
T3	(Spain) José María Olazábal	68	−2
T3	(United States) Bob Tway	68	−2
T7	(United States) John Daly	69	−1
T7	(United States) Jeff Maggert	69	−1
T7	(Sweden) Jesper Parnevik	69	−1
T10	(United States) Tom Kite	70	E
T10	(United States) Matt Kuchar (a)	70	E
T10	(Scotland) Colin Montgomerie	70	E
T10	(United States) Andrew Magee	70	E
T10	(United States) David Ogrin	70	E
T10	(United States) Mark O'Meara	70	E

=== Second round ===
Friday, June 19, 1998

The 36-hole cut was at 147 (+7), and 60 players advanced to the weekend.

Place	Player	Score	To par
1	(United States) Payne Stewart	66-71=137	−3
T2	(United States) Jeff Maggert	69-69=138	−2
T2	(United States) Bob Tway	68-70=138	−2
T4	(United States) Lee Janzen	73-66=139	−1
T4	(United States) Matt Kuchar (a)	70-69=139	−1
T4	(United States) Lee Porter	72-67=139	−1
7	(United States) Mark Carnevale	67-73=140	E
T8	(United States) Stewart Cink	73-68=141	+1
T8	(United States) Joe Durant	68-73=141	+1
T8	(United States) Brad Faxon	73-68=141	+1
T8	(Zimbabwe) Nick Price	73-68=141	+1

Amateurs: Kuchar (-1), Simson (+8), Eger (+9), Taylor (+12), Palmer (+15), Kribel (+18).

=== Third round ===
Saturday, June 20, 1998

Place	Player	Score	To par
1	(United States) Payne Stewart	66-71-70=207	−3
T2	(United States) Tom Lehman	68-75-68=211	+1
T2	(United States) Bob Tway	68-70-73=211	+1
T4	(Zimbabwe) Nick Price	73-68-71=212	+2
T4	(United States) Lee Janzen	73-66-73=212	+2
T6	(United States) Steve Stricker	73-71-69=213	+3
T6	(United States) Jeff Maggert	69-69-75=213	+3
T8	(United States) Stewart Cink	73-68-73=214	+4
T8	(United States) Mark Carnevale	67-73-74=214	+4
T10	(United States) Jim Furyk	74-73-68=215	+5
T10	(United States) Matt Kuchar (a)	70-69-76=215	+5
T10	(United States) Lee Porter	72-67-76=215	+5

=== Final round ===
Sunday, June 21, 1998

Place	Player	Score	To par	Money ($)
1	(United States) Lee Janzen	73-66-73-68=280	E	535,000
2	(United States) Payne Stewart	66-71-70-74=281	+1	315,000
3	(United States) Bob Tway	68-70-73-73=284	+4	201,730
4	(Zimbabwe) Nick Price	73-68-71-73=285	+5	140,597
T5	(United States) Steve Stricker	73-71-69-73=286	+6	107,392
T5	(United States) Tom Lehman	68-75-68-75=286	+6	107,392
T7	(United States) David Duval	75-68-75-69=287	+7	83,794
T7	(England) Lee Westwood	72-74-70-71=287	+7	83,794
T7	(United States) Jeff Maggert	69-69-75-74=287	+7	83,794
T10	(United States) Jeff Sluman	72-74-74-68=288	+8	64,490
T10	(United States) Phil Mickelson	71-73-74-70=288	+8	64,490
T10	(Australia) Stuart Appleby	73-74-70-71=288	+8	64,490
T10	(United States) Stewart Cink	73-68-73-74=288	+8	64,490

Amateurs: Matt Kuchar (+9)

==== Scorecard ====
Final round

Hole	1	2	3	4	5	6	7	8	9	10	11	12	13	14	15	16	17	18
Par	5	4	3	4	4	4	4	3	4	4	4	4	3	4	3	5	4	4
(United States) Janzen	+2	+3	+4	+3	+3	+3	+2	+2	+2	+2	+1	+1	E	E	E	E	E	E
(United States) Stewart	−3	−3	−3	−2	−2	−2	−1	−1	−1	−1	−1	E	+1	E	E	+1	+1	+1
(United States) Tway	+2	+3	+3	+3	+3	+3	+2	+2	+3	+3	+3	+4	+4	+4	+4	+4	+4	+4
(Zimbabwe) Price	+1	+1	+2	+2	+1	+2	+2	+3	+4	+4	+4	+4	+5	+5	+5	+5	+5	+5
(United States) Lehman	+2	+2	+2	+2	+2	+2	+2	+2	+3	+3	+3	+3	+3	+4	+4	+4	+6	+6
(United States) Stricker	+4	+5	+5	+6	+6	+6	+5	+5	+5	+5	+5	+6	+7	+7	+7	+6	+6	+6

Cumulative tournament scores, relative to par

Birdie	Bogey	Double bogey
