= 1986 U.S. Open (golf) =

Tournament information
- Dates: June 12–15, 1986
- Location: Shinnecock Hills, New York; 40.894°N 72.440°W
- Course: Shinnecock Hills Golf Club
- Organized by: USGA
- Tour: PGA Tour

Statistics
- Par: 70
- Length: 6,912 yards (6,320 m)
- Field: 155 players, 70 after cut
- Cut: 150 (+10)
- Prize fund: $700,000
- Winner's share: $115,000

Champion
- (United States) Raymond Floyd
- 279 (−1)
- Location in the United States Location in New York

The 1986 U.S. Open was the 86th U.S. Open, held June 12–15 at Shinnecock Hills Golf Club in Shinnecock Hills, New York. Raymond Floyd won his fourth and final major, two strokes ahead of runners-up Chip Beck and Lanny Wadkins. It was Floyd's only U.S. Open title and he became its oldest winner, a record he held for four years.

The opening round on Thursday had high winds with occasional heavy rain; the best score was Bob Tway's even-par 70, with Greg Norman a stroke behind. Norman led after 36 holes, and took the lead into the final round, a stroke ahead of Lee Trevino and Hal Sutton, but a 75 dropped him back six strokes to twelfth place. Norman led each of the four major championships in 1986 after 54 holes, but won just once, at The Open Championship.

During the final round, ten players either led or shared the lead; after Floyd birdied the par-3 11th, he was part of a nine-way tie for first. Floyd began the round three strokes back and separated himself from the pack with a bogey-free 66. After the birdie at 11, he saved par at 12, then recorded another birdie at 13 to tie for the lead. Floyd took sole possession of the lead after the 14th, then added another birdie at the 16th. After finishing his round, he was two strokes ahead of his closest pursuers: Wadkins and Beck both shot 65 to climb the leaderboard and shared second place. They tied the course record, set earlier in the day by Mark Calcavecchia.

With the win, Floyd became the oldest winner of the U.S. Open at 43 years and 284 days, surpassing the long-standing record of Ted Ray from 1920 by several months (Julius Boros was also 43 in 1963). It was Floyd's fourth and final major championship, and he only won twice more in his career. At age 46, Masters champion Jack Nicklaus overcame an opening round 77 and tied for eighth, his last top-ten finish at the U.S. Open. Hale Irwin won his third U.S. Open at age 45 in 1990 in a playoff and remains the oldest champion; in 1986, he was the only former champion in the field to miss the cut. Boros remained the oldest winner of a modern major at age 48 at the PGA Championship in 1968, until Phil Mickelson broke the record to become the oldest winner of a major at age 50 at the PGA Championship in 2021.

Entering this championship, Floyd had played in 21 U.S. Opens and had only two finishes in the top ten. His best result was a tie for sixth in 1965; he finished eighth in 1971, fifteen years earlier. His winner's share in 1986 was more than double his previous career earnings at the U.S. Open.

It was the second U.S. Open at Shinnecock Hills, which previously hosted 90 years earlier in 1896. The championship returned in 1995, 2004, 2018, and 2026.

== Course layout ==
Hole	1	2	3	4	5	6	7	8	9	Out	10	11	12	13	14	15	16	17	18	In	Total
Yards	394	226	453	408	535	471	188	367	447	3,489	409	158	472	377	444	397	544	172	450	3,423	6,912
Par	4	3	4	4	5	4	3	4	4	35	4	3	4	4	4	4	5	3	4	35	70

== Round summaries ==
=== First round ===
Thursday, June 12, 1986

Place	Player	Score	To par
1	(United States) Bob Tway	70	E
2	(Australia) Greg Norman	71	+1
T3	(United States) Rick Fehr	72	+2
T3	(South Africa) David Frost	72	+2
T3	(United States) Kenny Knox	72	+2
T3	(Japan) Tsuneyuki Nakajima	72	+2
T3	(Zimbabwe) Denis Watson	72	+2
T3	(United States) Tom Watson	72	+2
T9	(United States) Gary Koch	73	+3
T9	(United States) Bob Lohr	73	+3
T9	(United States) Jodie Mudd	73	+3

=== Second round ===
Friday, June 13, 1986

Place	Player	Score	To par
1	(Australia) Greg Norman	71-68=139	−1
T2	(United States) Lee Trevino	74-68=142	+2
T2	(Zimbabwe) Denis Watson	72-70=142	+2
T4	(United States) Raymond Floyd	75-68=143	+3
T4	(United States) Bob Tway	70-73=143	+3
T4	(United States) Tom Watson	72-71=143	+3
T7	(South Africa) David Frost	72-72=144	+4
T7	(West Germany) Bernhard Langer	74-70=144	+4
T7	(Japan) Tsuneyuki Nakajima	72-72=144	+4
T7	(United States) Mac O'Grady	75-69=144	+4
T7	(United States) Payne Stewart	76-68=144	+4
T7	(United States) Bobby Wadkins	75-69=144	+4
T7	(United States) Lanny Wadkins	74-70=144	+4

Amateurs: Randolph (+10), Fleming (+11), Watts (+17), Lewis (+22), Daly (+24)

=== Third round ===
Saturday, June 14, 1986

Place	Player	Score	To par
1	(Australia) Greg Norman	71-68-71=210	E
T2	(United States) Hal Sutton	75-70-66=211	+1
T2	(United States) Lee Trevino	74-68-69=211	+1
4	(United States) Bob Tway	70-73-69=212	+2
T5	(United States) Raymond Floyd	75-68-70=213	+3
T5	(United States) Mark McCumber	74-71-68=213	+3
T5	(United States) Mike Reid	74-73-66=213	+3
T5	(United States) Payne Stewart	76-68-69=213	+3
T5	(Zimbabwe) Denis Watson	72-70-71=213	+3
T10	(United States) Lennie Clements	75-72-67=214	+4
T10	(United States) Ben Crenshaw	76-69-69=214	+4
T10	(West Germany) Bernhard Langer	74-70-70=214	+4
T10	(United States) Scott Verplank	75-72-67=214	+4
T10	(United States) Tom Watson	72-71-71=214	+4

=== Final round ===
Sunday, June 15, 1986

Place	Player	Score	To par	Money ($)
1	(United States) Raymond Floyd	75-68-70-66=279	−1	115,000
T2	(United States) Chip Beck	75-73-68-65=281	+1	47,646
T2	(United States) Lanny Wadkins	74-70-72-65=281	+1	47,646
T4	(United States) Hal Sutton	75-70-66-71=282	+2	26,269
T4	(United States) Lee Trevino	74-68-69-71=282	+2	26,269
T6	(United States) Ben Crenshaw	76-69-69-69=283	+3	19,009
T6	(United States) Payne Stewart	76-68-69-70=283	+3	19,009
T8	(West Germany) Bernhard Langer	74-70-70-70=284	+4	14,500
T8	(United States) Mark McCumber	74-71-68-71=284	+4	14,500
T8	(United States) Jack Nicklaus	77-72-67-68=284	+4	14,500
T8	(United States) Bob Tway	70-73-69-72=284	+4	14,500

Amateur: Randolph (+11).

==== Scorecard ====
Hole	1	2	3	4	5	6	7	8	9	10	11	12	13	14	15	16	17	18
Par	4	3	4	4	5	4	3	4	4	4	3	4	4	4	4	5	3	4
(United States) Floyd	+3	+3	+3	+2	+2	+2	+2	+2	+2	+2	+1	+1	E	E	E	−1	−1	−1
(United States) Beck	+6	+6	+6	+5	+6	+7	+6	+6	+6	+5	+4	+3	+2	+2	+1	+1	+1	+1
(United States) Wadkins	+6	+5	+5	+5	+5	+5	+5	+5	+5	+5	+4	+4	+4	+3	+2	+1	+1	+1
(United States) Sutton	E	E	E	+1	E	+1	+1	+1	E	E	E	+1	+1	+1	+2	+2	+2	+2
(United States) Trevino	E	E	+1	+1	E	+1	+1	+1	+2	+2	+2	+2	+2	+3	+3	+2	+2	+2
(Australia) Norman	E	E	+1	+1	+1	+2	+1	+1	+2	+3	+4	+4	+5	+4	+5	+5	+5	+5

Cumulative tournament scores, relative to par

Birdie	Bogey
