= Corey Pavin =

American professional golfer (born 1959)

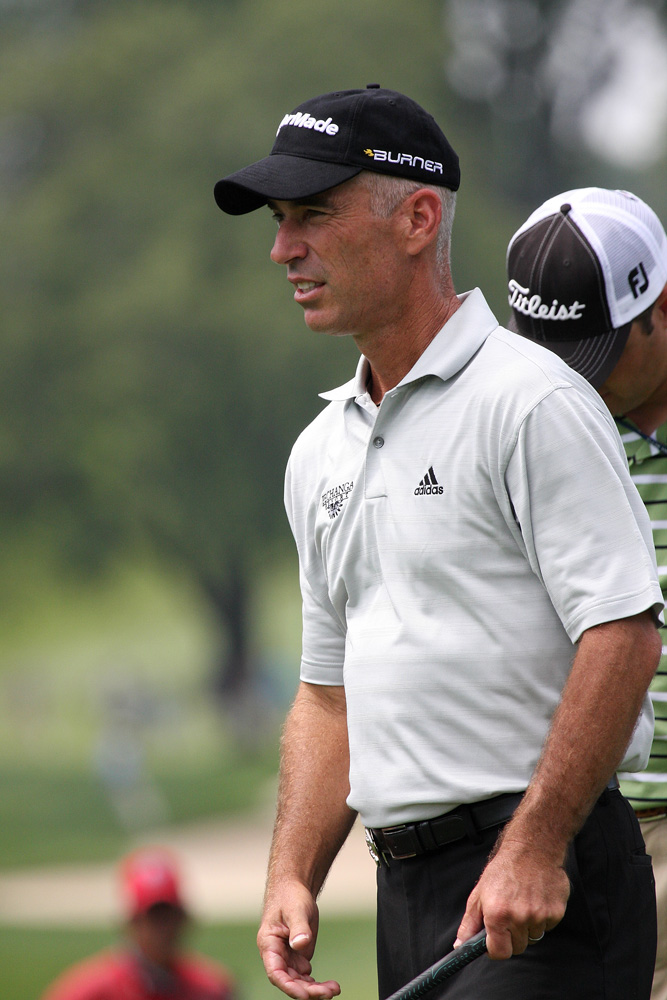
- Pavin in 2008

Personal information
- Full name: Corey Allen Pavin
- Nickname: Bulldog
- Nationality: United States
- Born: November 16, 1959 (age 66) Oxnard, California, U.S.
- Height: 5 ft 9 in (1.75 m)
- Weight: 155 lb (70 kg; 11.1 st)
- Spouses: Shannon Healy (divorced); Lisa Nguyen (2003-present)

Career
- Sport: Golf
- College: University of California, Los Angeles
- Turned professional: 1982
- Current tour: PGA Tour Champions
- Former tours: PGA Tour; European Tour
- Professional wins: 28
- Highest ranking: 2 (June 2, 1996)

Number of wins by tour
- PGA Tour: 15
- European Tour: 2
- Japan Golf Tour: 2
- PGA Tour of Australasia: 2
- PGA Tour Champions: 1
- Other: 6

Best results in major championships (wins: 1)
- Masters Tournament: 3rd: 1992
- PGA Championship: 2nd: 1994
- U.S. Open: Won: 1995
- The Open Championship: T4: 1993

Achievements and awards
- PGA Tour Rookie of the Year: 1984
- PGA Tour money list winner: 1991
- PGA Player of the Year: 1991

Corey Allen Pavin (born November 16, 1959) is an American professional golfer. In 1982, Pavin turned professional but failed at PGA Tour Qualifying School. The following year, he turned to overseas where he had much success, winning South Africa's Lexington PGA and Europe's German Open. Later in the year he earned PGA Tour membership and had much success on tour, winning a number of events, culminating with the 1995 U.S. Open championship. Soon thereafter, he abruptly lost his game and was rarely a contender. As a senior, Pavin has played on the PGA Tour Champions, recording one win, at the Allianz Championship.

== Early life and amateur career ==
Pavin was born in Oxnard, California, the son of Barbara and Jack Pavin. He attended Oxnard High School.

Pavin attended the University of California, Los Angeles (UCLA). He won two gold medals at the 1981 Maccabiah Games, the Jewish Olympics in Israel.

== Professional career ==
In 1982, Pavin turned professional. He was "an unexpected failure" at 1982 PGA Tour Qualifying School. He did not move past the regional qualifying section. He turned to play overseas in 1983. Early in the year, he played on the Southern African Tour where he "won his first professional tournament" at the Lexington PGA. It was only his fourth tournament as a professional golfer. He soon moved onto the European Tour. In July, he finished solo 3rd, only behind Sam Torrance and Craig Stadler, at the Scandinavian Enterprise Open. A month later, Pavin won the German Open three strokes ahead of joint runner-up Seve Ballesteros. He finished 13th on the Order of Merit.

Pavin's first PGA Tour victory came at the 1984 Houston Coca-Cola Open. He won at least one event significant domestic or international event over the next decade and topped the PGA Tour's money list in 1991. Pavin's success culminated in his only major victory, the 1995 U.S. Open at Shinnecock Hills Golf Club. Pavin went into the final round three strokes behind Greg Norman and Tom Lehman. On the 72nd and final hole of the tournament, a 450 yards long par 4, Pavin produced a four wood, considered one of the great shots in U.S. Open history, 228 yards to five feet of the hole to secure the title.

Rather than marking a move to a new level of achievement, however, this was soon followed by a long slide down the world rankings from a high ranking of 2nd. After Pavin won the Bank of America Colonial in 1996, he did not win another PGA Tour tournament for ten years. His 89th-place finish on the 2004 money list was the first time he had made the top one hundred since 1998. Pavin finally won his 15th career title in 2006 at the U.S. Bank Championship in Milwaukee, ending a streak of 242 consecutive tournaments without a win.

On July 27, 2006, during the first round of what would become his 15th tour title, Pavin broke the record for the fewest strokes needed to complete nine holes at a PGA Tour event, with an 8-under par score of 26. The previous record of 27 strokes was held by Mike Souchak, Andy North, Billy Mayfair and Robert Gamez, with Mayfair and Gamez' scores being 9-under par. His 36-hole total of 125 also tied the record for fewest shots taken in the first 36 holes of a PGA Tour event held by Tom Lehman, Mark Calcavecchia, and Tiger Woods.

After acting as an assistant to U.S. Ryder Cup captain Tom Lehman in 2006, Pavin was in December 2008 by the PGA of America, named captain for the U.S. team at the 2010 Ryder Cup at the Celtic Manor Resort in Newport, Wales. In October 2010, the U.S. Ryder Cup team lost 13½ to 14½, against the European side.

Pavin began playing on the Champions Tour in 2010. In June 2010, he lost in a sudden death playoff to Bubba Watson at the Travelers Championship on the PGA Tour. In his 35th start, Pavin won his maiden Champions Tour event in February 2012 at the Allianz Championship. He defeated Peter Senior at the first sudden death playoff hole with a birdie to take the title, after having finished regulation play at 11 under.

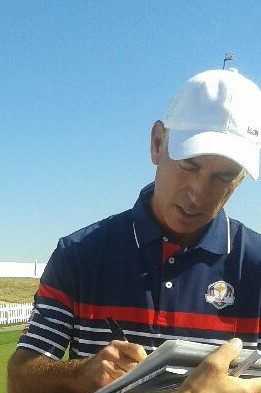
Corey Pavin at the Past Captains Match 27 September 2018 ahead of the 2018 Ryder Cup match at Le Golf National outside Paris, France

== Personal life ==
In April 1983, Pavin married Shannon Healy. They have two children. He married Lisa Nguyen in 2003.

He was the only top Jewish player on the tour until 1991. In that year, he converted to Christianity. He was named the 117th-greatest Jewish athlete in the 2007 book The Big Book of Jewish Sports Heroes by Peter S. Horvitz.

Pavin is a Republican. During the 1993 Ryder Cup, Pavin was originally unwilling to meet with president Bill Clinton before the cup owing to their differing political views. Pavin stated that he had voted for Bush, and so was not particularly excited at the prospect of meeting Clinton.

Pavin made a cameo appearance playing himself in the 1996 movie Tin Cup starring Kevin Costner. In the movie, Pavin tells Fred Couples, "It's hard to believe that a guy named 'Tin Cup' might have his name beneath mine on the trophy."

== Awards and honors ==
- In 2002, he was named to the Ventura County Sports Hall of Fame.
- He has a stone named after him at Bedlingtonshire Golf Club, in Northumberland, England. It is located on the 7th hole and is called "Corey Paving Slab".

== Amateur wins ==
- 1981 North and South Amateur

== Professional wins (28) ==
=== PGA Tour wins (15) ===
Legend
Major championships (1)
Other PGA Tour (14)

No.	Date	Tournament	Winning score	Margin of victory	Runner(s)-up
1	Apr 29, 1984	Houston Coca-Cola Open	−10 (70-68-68-68=274)	1 stroke	(United States) Buddy Gardner
2	May 19, 1985	Colonial National Invitation	−14 (66-64-68-68=266)	4 strokes	(United States) Bob Murphy
3	Feb 16, 1986	Hawaiian Open	−16 (67-67-72-66=272)	2 strokes	(United States) Paul Azinger
4	Sep 21, 1986	Greater Milwaukee Open	−16 (66-72-67-67=272)	Playoff	(Canada) Dave Barr
5	Jan 18, 1987	Bob Hope Chrysler Classic	−19 (72-71-65-66-67=341)	1 stroke	(West Germany) Bernhard Langer
6	Feb 8, 1987	Hawaiian Open (2)	−18 (65-75-66-64=270)	Playoff	(United States) Craig Stadler
7	Oct 16, 1988	Texas Open	−21 (64-63-66-66=259)	8 strokes	(United States) Robert Wrenn
8	Feb 10, 1991	Bob Hope Chrysler Classic (2)	−29 (65-69-66-66-65=331)	Playoff	(United States) Mark O'Meara
9	May 12, 1991	BellSouth Atlanta Golf Classic	−16 (68-67-67-70=272)	Playoff	(United States) Steve Pate
10	Mar 15, 1992	Honda Classic	−15 (68-67-70-68=273)	Playoff	(United States) Fred Couples
11	Feb 13, 1994	Nissan Los Angeles Open	−13 (67-64-72-68=271)	2 strokes	(United States) Fred Couples
12	Feb 26, 1995	Nissan Open (2)	−16 (67-66-68-67=268)	3 strokes	(United States) Jay Don Blake, (United States) Kenny Perry
13	Jun 18, 1995	U.S. Open	E (72-69-71-68=280)	2 strokes	(Australia) Greg Norman
14	May 19, 1996	MasterCard Colonial (2)	−8 (69-67-67-69=272)	2 strokes	(United States) Jeff Sluman
15	Jul 30, 2006	U.S. Bank Championship in Milwaukee (2)	−20 (61-64-68-67=260)	2 strokes	(United States) Jerry Kelly

PGA Tour playoff record (5–4)

No.	Year	Tournament	Opponent(s)	Result
1	1986	Greater Milwaukee Open	(Canada) Dave Barr	Won with birdie on fourth extra hole
2	1987	Hawaiian Open	(United States) Craig Stadler	Won with birdie on second extra hole
3	1991	Bob Hope Chrysler Classic	(United States) Mark O'Meara	Won with birdie on first extra hole
4	1991	BellSouth Atlanta Golf Classic	(United States) Steve Pate	Won with par on second extra hole
5	1991	Canon Greater Hartford Open	(United States) Billy Ray Brown, (United States) Rick Fehr	Brown won with birdie on first extra hole
6	1992	Honda Classic	(United States) Fred Couples	Won with birdie on second extra hole
7	1992	Southwestern Bell Colonial	(United States) Bruce Lietzke	Lost to birdie on first extra hole
8	1995	Kemper Open	(United States) Lee Janzen	Lost to birdie on first extra hole
9	2010	Travelers Championship	(United States) Scott Verplank, (United States) Bubba Watson	Watson won with par on second extra hole Pavin eliminated by par on first hole

=== European Tour wins (2) ===
Legend
Major championships (1)
Other European Tour (1)

No.	Date	Tournament	Winning score	Margin of victory	Runner(s)-up
1	Jul 31, 1983	Lufthansa German Open	−13 (67-71-68-69=275)	3 strokes	(Spain) Seve Ballesteros, (Zimbabwe) Tony Johnstone
2	Jun 18, 1995	U.S. Open	E (72-69-71-68=280)	2 strokes	(Australia) Greg Norman

=== PGA of Japan Tour wins (2) ===
No.	Date	Tournament	Winning score	Margin of victory	Runner-up
1	Nov 3, 1985	ABC Japan-U.S. Match	−12 (70-68-67-71=276)	Shared title with (Japan) Tateo Ozaki	
2	Oct 9, 1994	Tokai Classic	−11 (68-69-68-72=277)	1 stroke	(Taiwan) Hsieh Chin-sheng

=== Asia Golf Circuit wins (1) ===
No.	Date	Tournament	Winning score	Margin of victory	Runner-up
1	Oct 15, 1995	Volvo Asian Masters	−14 (72-66-67-69=274)	9 strokes	(Japan) Isao Aoki

=== Southern Africa Tour wins (1) ===
No.	Date	Tournament	Winning score	Margin of victory	Runner-up
1	Jan 22, 1983	Lexington PGA Championship	−10 (70-68-66-66=270)	1 stroke	(Zimbabwe) Nick Price

=== PGA Tour of Australasia wins (2) ===
No.	Date	Tournament	Winning score	Margin of victory	Runner-up
1	Dec 9, 1984	New Zealand Open	−19 (68-67-65-69=269)	4 strokes	(Australia) Terry Gale
2	Dec 8, 1985 (1986 season)	New Zealand Open (2)	−15 (67-67-70-73=277)	4 strokes	(Australia) Jeff Senior

PGA Tour of Australasia playoff record (0–1)

No.	Year	Tournament	Opponent	Result
1	1998	ANZ Players Championship	(Australia) Stephen Leaney	Lost to par on first extra hole

=== Other wins (5) ===
- 1983 Calberson Classic (Europe – not a European Tour event)
- 1993 Toyota World Match Play Championship (Europe – then an unofficial event).
- 1995 Nedbank Million Dollar Challenge (South Africa – unofficial event)
- 1996 Ssang Yong International Challenge (South Korea)
- 1999 Martel Skins Game (Taiwan)

=== Champions Tour wins (1) ===
No.	Date	Tournament	Winning score	Margin of victory	Runner-up
1	Feb 12, 2012	Allianz Championship	−11 (64-70-71=205)	Playoff	(Australia) Peter Senior

Champions Tour playoff record (1–1)

No.	Year	Tournament	Opponent	Result
1	2012	Allianz Championship	(Australia) Peter Senior	Won with par on first extra hole
2	2013	Pacific Links Hawai'i Championship	(United States) Mark Wiebe	Lost to par on second extra hole

== Major championships ==
=== Wins (1) ===
Year	Championship	54 holes	Winning score	Margin	Runner-up
1995	U.S. Open	3 shot deficit	E (72-69-71-68=280)	2 strokes	(Australia) Greg Norman

=== Results timeline ===
Tournament	1981	1982	1983	1984	1985	1986	1987	1988	1989
Masters Tournament		CUT			T25	T11	T27	T42	50
U.S. Open	CUT	T60	CUT		T9	CUT	WD	CUT	
The Open Championship				T22	T39	CUT	CUT	T38	
PGA Championship				T20	T6	T21	CUT	T17	CUT

Tournament	1990	1991	1992	1993	1994	1995	1996	1997	1998	1999
Masters Tournament		T22	3	T11	T8	T17	T7	T43	T41	CUT
U.S. Open	T24	T8	CUT	T19	CUT	1	T40	CUT	CUT	T34
The Open Championship	T8	CUT	T34	T4	CUT	T8	T27	T51	CUT	CUT
PGA Championship	T14	T32	T12	CUT	2	CUT	T26		CUT	T10

Tournament	2000	2001	2002	2003	2004	2005	2006	2007	2008	2009	2010
Masters Tournament	CUT										
U.S. Open	CUT	T19	T54	CUT	T17	T11	CUT				
The Open Championship	CUT	CUT	T22	CUT							
PGA Championship	CUT						T49	T62	T63	T19	CUT

Win
Top 10
Did not play

CUT = missed the half way cut
"T" indicates a tie for a place.

=== Summary ===
Tournament	Wins	2nd	3rd	Top-5	Top-10	Top-25	Events	Cuts made
Masters Tournament	0	0	1	1	3	8	16	13
U.S. Open	1	0	0	1	3	8	24	12
The Open Championship	0	0	0	1	3	5	19	10
PGA Championship	0	1	0	1	3	9	21	14
Totals	1	1	1	4	12	30	80	49

- Most consecutive cuts made – 7 (1984 Open Championship – 1986 Masters)
- Longest streak of top-10s – 2 (1995 U.S. Open – 1995 Open Championship)

== Results in The Players Championship ==
Tournament	1984	1985	1986	1987	1988	1989	1990	1991	1992	1993	1994	1995	1996	1997	1998	1999
The Players Championship	CUT	CUT	T58	T50	T42	T34	CUT	T41	T46	T16	T78	T3	T46	CUT	CUT	T71

Tournament	2000	2001	2002	2003	2004	2005	2006	2007	2008	2009	2010	2011
The Players Championship	T61	T21	CUT	T32	T33	CUT	CUT	T72		CUT		T45

Top 10
Did not play

CUT = missed the halfway cut
"T" indicates a tie for a place

== Results in World Golf Championships ==
Tournament	2006
Match Play	
Championship	
Invitational	T48

Did not play

"T" = Tied

== U.S. national team appearances ==
Amateur

- Walker Cup: 1981 (winners)

Professional

- USA vs. Japan: 1982
- Nissan Cup: 1985 (winners)
- Ryder Cup: 1991 (winners), 1993 (winners), 1995, 2010 (non-playing captain)
- Presidents Cup: 1994 (winners), 1996 (winners)

== See also ==
- 1983 PGA Tour Qualifying School graduates
- List of Jewish golfers
