= 1966 U.S. Open (golf) =

Tournament information
- Dates: June 16–20, 1966
- Location: San Francisco, California; 37.709°N 122.495°W
- Courses: Olympic Club, Lake Course
- Organized by: USGA
- Tour: PGA Tour

Statistics
- Par: 70
- Length: 6,719 yards (6,144 m)
- Field: 151 players, 64 after cut
- Cut: 151 (+11)
- Prize fund: $147,490
- Winner's share: $26,500

Champion
- (United States) Billy Casper
- 278 (−2), playoff
- Location in the United States Location in California

The 1966 U.S. Open was the 66th U.S. Open, held June 16–20 at the Lake Course of the Olympic Club in San Francisco, California. Billy Casper, the 1959 champion, staged one of the greatest comebacks in history by erasing a seven-stroke deficit on the final nine holes to tie Arnold Palmer; he then prevailed in an 18-hole playoff to win the second of his three major titles. It was the fourth playoff in five years at the U.S. Open, and the third for Palmer, the 1960 champion.

Of the fifteen sub-par rounds posted in this U.S. Open, four belonged to Casper. He one-putted 33 greens and did not three-putt a green until the 81st hole. The "continuous putting" rule was in effect for this Open. Once putting on a green, the players had to keep putting until holing out. There was no marking of balls on the green except for lifting to clean. The rule was put into effect to speed up play at the Open.

Three future champions made their major championship debuts and all made the cut: Lee Trevino and collegians Hale Irwin and Johnny Miller. Irwin was entering his senior year at Colorado, where he was also an all-conference defensive back for the Buffaloes in football. Miller was a San Francisco native and junior merit member of the Olympic Club entering his sophomore year at BYU; he finished tied for eighth and was the low amateur by three strokes.

It was the penultimate appearance at the U.S. Open for four-time champion Ben Hogan; he finished twelfth at age 53. Cary Middlecoff, champion in 1949 and 1956, made his final appearance this year but withdrew after the first round. Sam Snead, 54, failed to qualify for the U.S. Open for the first time in thirty years; he had played in every edition since 1937, but never won.

The winner's share was $25,000 and both playoff participants received a $1,500 bonus. Daily admission was five dollars for the first two rounds, seven dollars on the weekend, and five for the playoff.

This was the second U.S. Open at the Lake Course of the Olympic Club, the first was in 1955 and also ended in a playoff. The U.S. Open returned in 1987, 1998, and 2012; all three were won by one stroke.

== Round summaries ==
=== First round ===
Thursday, June 16, 1966

Place	Player	Score	To par
1	(United States) Al Mengert	67	−3
T2	(United States) Don Massengale	68	−2
T2	(United States) Gene Littler	68	−2
4	(United States) Billy Casper	69	−1
T5	(United States) Phil Rodgers	70	E
T5	(Australia) Kel Nagle	70	E
T5	(United States) Doug Sanders	70	E
T5	(United States) Johnny Miller (a)	70	E
T9	(United States) Arnold Palmer	71	+1
T9	(United States) Jack Nicklaus	71	+1
T9	(United States) Tony Lema	71	+1
T9	(United States) Dave Marr	71	+1
T9	(United States) Bob Goalby	71	+1
T9	(United States) Wes Ellis	71	+1
T9	(United States) Tom Nieporte	71	+1

=== Second round ===
Friday, June 17, 1966

The grouping of Jack Nicklaus, Tony Lema, and Bruce Devlin was instructed to speed up by a USGA official and Nicklaus promptly made four consecutive bogeys. They had been in the rough often early in the round and finished in less than four and a half hours, but nearly an hour longer than others.

Place	Player	Score	To par
T1	(United States) Billy Casper	69-68=137	−3
T1	(United States) Arnold Palmer	71-66=137	−3
T3	(United States) Phil Rodgers	70-70=140	E
T3	(United States) Rives McBee	76-64=140	E
T5	(United States) Jack Nicklaus	71-71=142	+2
T5	(United States) Johnny Miller (a)	70-72=142	+2
T7	(United States) Julius Boros	74-69=143	+3
T7	(United States) Dave Hill	72-71=143	+3
T7	(Australia) Kel Nagle	70-73=143	+3
T10	(United States) Bob Goalby	71-73=144	+4
T10	(United States) Al Mengert	67-77=144	+4

=== Third round ===
Saturday, June 18, 1966

Place	Player	Score	To par
1	(United States) Arnold Palmer	71-66-70=207	−3
2	(United States) Billy Casper	69-68-73=210	E
3	(United States) Jack Nicklaus	71-71-69=211	+1
T4	(United States) Phil Rodgers	70-70-73=213	+3
T4	(United States) Dave Marr	71-74-68=213	+3
6	(United States) Rives McBee	76-64-74=214	+4
T7	(United States) Tony Lema	71-74-70=215	+5
T7	(United States) Bob Goalby	71-73-71=215	+5
T7	(United States) Al Mengert	67-77-71=215	+5
10	(United States) Johnny Miller (a)	70-72-74=216	+6

=== Final round ===
Sunday, June 19, 1966

Palmer began the final round with a three-stroke lead over Casper, his partner in the final pairing. Palmer shot 32 (−3) on the front nine and with Casper's 36, the lead was seven strokes at the turn. With his eye on Hogan's U.S. Open scoring record (276 in 1948), Palmer needed to shoot just 36 (+1) on the back nine for 275. But after the turn, his game quickly unravelled; he bogeyed 10, rebounded with a birdie at 12, but bogeyed 13. At the par-3 15th, Casper made birdie and Palmer missed a par putt, dropping the lead to just three. After another birdie-bogey swing at the par-5 16th, Palmer's lead completely disappeared with another bogey at 17. Palmer needed a difficult up-and-down from the rough for par on 18 just to force a playoff.

Palmer shot 39 (+4) on the inward nine, Casper 32 (−3), and the two tied at 278 (−2), seven strokes ahead of solo third-place finisher Jack Nicklaus, the 1962 champion. The Bay Area's affable Tony Lema tied for fourth. He and his wife were killed in a plane crash a month later. Four-time champion Hogan, age 53, shot even par in the final round to finish alone in 12th place and received a standing ovation from the thousands on the hillside overlooking the 18th green.

Place	Player	Score	To par	Money ($)
T1	(United States) Billy Casper	69-68-73-68=278	−2	Playoff
T1	(United States) Arnold Palmer	71-66-70-71=278	−2	Playoff
3	(United States) Jack Nicklaus	71-71-69-74=285	+5	9,000
T4	(United States) Tony Lema	71-74-70-71=286	+6	6,500
T4	(United States) Dave Marr	71-74-68-73=286	+6	6,500
6	(United States) Phil Rodgers	70-70-73-74=287	+7	5,000
7	(United States) Bobby Nichols	74-72-71-72=289	+9	4,000
T8	(United States) Wes Ellis	71-75-74-70=290	+10	2,800
T8	(United States) Doug Sanders	70-75-74-71=290	+10	2,800
T8	(United States) Mason Rudolph	74-72-71-73=290	+10	2,800
T8	(United States) Johnny Miller (a)	70-72-74-74=290	+10	0

(a) denotes amateur

==== Scorecard ====
Hole	1	2	3	4	5	6	7	8	9	10	11	12	13	14	15	16	17	18
Par	5	4	3	4	4	4	4	3	4	4	4	4	3	4	3	5	4	4
(United States) Casper	E	E	+1	E	+1	+1	+1	+1	+1	+1	+1	E	E	E	−1	−2	−2	−2
(United States) Palmer	−4	−5	−5	−5	−5	−4	−5	−5	−6	−5	−5	−6	−5	−5	−4	−3	−2	−2

Cumulative tournament scores, relative to par

Birdie	Bogey

=== Playoff ===
Monday, June 20, 1966

The 18-hole playoff proved similar to the final round, with a Monday gallery of 12,000 under sunny skies. Palmer took a two-stroke lead to the back nine, only to fall apart once again. The pair halved 10 and 11, but Casper birdied 12 and Palmer bogeyed to even up the playoff with six holes remaining. Palmer bogeyed 14 and 15, then double-bogeyed the par-5 16th. Casper finished with a one-under 69, four strokes ahead of Palmer, who shot a 40 (+5) on the back nine. For Palmer, it marked his third loss in as many playoffs at the U.S. Open (1962, 1963, and 1966).

Place	Player	Score	To par	Money ($)
1	(United States) Billy Casper	69	−1	26,500
2	(United States) Arnold Palmer	73	+3	14,000

- Included in earnings is a playoff bonus of $1,500 each, from the playoff gate receipts.

==== Scorecard ====
Hole	1	2	3	4	5	6	7	8	9	10	11	12	13	14	15	16	17	18
Par	5	4	3	4	4	4	4	3	4	4	4	4	3	4	3	5	4	4
(United States) Casper	E	E	E	E	+1	+1	E	−1	E	E	E	−1	−2	−2	−2	−1	E	−1
(United States) Palmer	E	E	E	−1	−1	−1	−2	−2	−2	−2	−2	−1	−1	E	+1	+3	+3	+3

Birdie	Bogey	Double bogey
