= Shane O'Donoghue (journalist) =

Irish golf journalist

Shane O'Donoghue is an Irish golf journalist who presents Living Golf on CNN. From Clonmel, County Tipperary, Shane worked for RTÉ as a presenter, DJ and read the news on 2fm's The Full Irish morning/breakfast show. A keen golfer, Shane has presented and contributed to shows for RTÉ and the BBC as part of their golf coverage, he has also worked for the European Tour World feed of its events. Shane moved to the United States to work for CNN and has also worked for the Golf Channel and Fox.

In 1996 while working as a DJ for 2FM Shane recorded a single Goodbye Girl by David Gates, which was released as part of the stations Christmas charity appeal, with former Eurovision winner Paul Harrington and his band, who helped record the single, which featured in the Irish charts in December 1996 and January 1997.

In 2007 O'Donoghue published a book on Irish Amateur golfers called Legends in their Spare time. In 2011 he joined CNN.

== Publications ==
- 'Legends in their Spare time' by Shane O'Donoghue, ABC Abercorn House, 2007.
