= Shinnecock Hills, New York =

- Hamlet and census-designated place
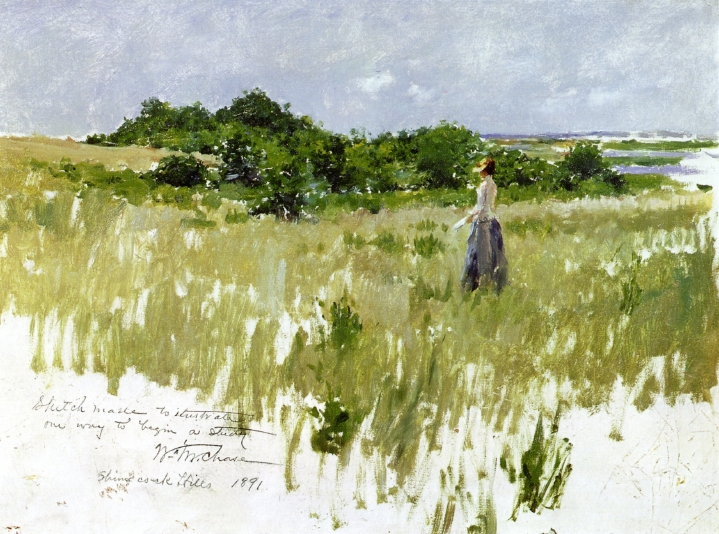
- Shinnecock Hills, oil on panel, 1891. William Merritt Chase

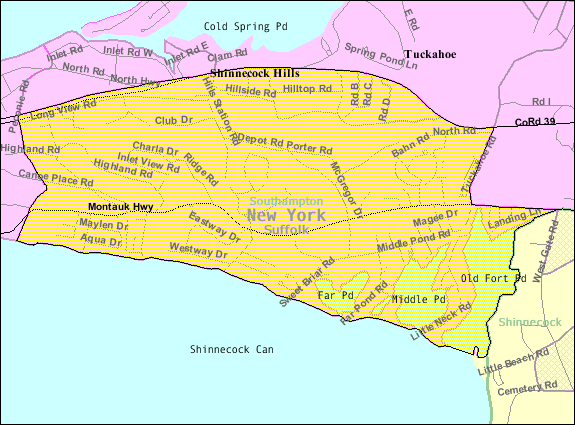

- Location within New York
- Coordinates: 40°53′17″N 72°27′42″W
- Country: United States
- State: New York
- County: Suffolk
- Town: Southampton

Area
  - Total: 3.02 sq mi (7.82 km^{2})
  - Land: 2.82 sq mi (7.30 km^{2})
  - Water: 0.20 sq mi (0.52 km^{2})
- Elevation: 79 ft (24 m)

Population (2020)
  - Total: 2,282
  - Density: 810.0/sq mi (312.75/km^{2})
- Time zone: UTC-5 (Eastern (EST))
  - Summer (DST): UTC-4 (EDT)
- FIPS code: 36-67048
- GNIS feature ID: 0973063

Shinnecock Hills is a hamlet (and census-designated place) in Suffolk County, New York, United States. As of the 2020 census, Shinnecock Hills had a population of 2,282. It is the home of a leading golf club, Shinnecock Hills Golf Club. Ownership of the area has been the subject of a 2005 lawsuit filed by the Shinnecock Indian Nation.

Shinnecock Hills is in the Town of Southampton.

== Geography ==
Shinnecock Hills is located at 40°53′17″N 72°27′42″W (40.888100, -72.461735), immediately east of the Shinnecock Canal.

According to the United States Census Bureau, the CDP has a total area of 3.1 square miles (7.9 km^{2}), of which 2.9 square miles (7.4 km^{2}) is land and 0.19 square miles (0.5 km^{2}), or 6.61%, is water.

The highest point in Shinnecock Hills is 141 feet (43 m) above sea level.

Historical population
| Census | Pop. | Note | %± |
|---|---|---|---|
| 2020 | 2,282 | | — |
U.S. Decennial Census

== Demographics ==
As of the census of 2000, there were 1,749 people, 502 households, and 313 families residing in the CDP. The population density was 842.9 inhabitants per square mile (325.4/km^{2}). There were 928 housing units at an average density of 447.3 per square mile (172.7/km^{2}). The racial makeup of the CDP was 89.99% White, 4.23% African American, 0.97% Native American, 0.97% Asian, 2.17% from other races, and 1.66% from two or more races. Hispanic or Latino of any race were 10.41% of the population.

There were 502 households, out of which 24.1% had children under the age of 18 living with them, 52.8% were married couples living together, 6.8% had a female householder with no husband present, and 37.6% were non-families. 27.7% of all households were made up of individuals, and 14.5% had someone living alone who was 65 years of age or older. The average household size was 2.45 and the average family size was 3.00.

In the CDP, the population was spread out, with 13.8% under the age of 18, 34.0% from 18 to 24, 17.6% from 25 to 44, 20.5% from 45 to 64, and 14.1% who were 65 years of age or older. The median age was 28 years. For every 100 females, there were 82.8 males. For every 100 females age 18 and over, there were 78.8 males.

The median income for a household in the CDP was $72,500, and the median income for a family was $89,211. Males had a median income of $51,172 versus $32,500 for females. The per capita income for the CDP was $28,378. About 7.7% of families and 13.9% of the population were below the poverty line, including 19.7% of those under age 18 and 6.8% of those age 65 or over.

== Land claim dispute ==
There is a question mark over ownership of the area of Shinnecock Hills, as it is claimed by the Shinnecock Indian Nation as their land that was seized in a white land grab in 1859.

In 2005 the nation filed a lawsuit against the state seeking the return of 3,500 acres (1,400 ha) in Southampton around the tribe's reservation and billions of dollars in reparations. The disputed property includes the Shinnecock Hills Golf Club, which Native American representatives say is the location of tribal burial grounds.

The core of the lawsuit is over a 1703 deal between Southampton and the tribe for a 1,000-year lease. The suit charges that a group of powerful investors conspired to break the lease in 1859 by sending the state legislature a fraudulent petition from a number of Shinnecock tribesmen. Although other tribal members immediately protested that the petition was a forgery, the Legislature approved the sale of 3,500 acres (1,400 ha) of former tribal land. The town of Southampton is claimed to have spent over $732,000 in legal fees in relation to this lawsuit.
