= Azalea Open Invitational =

Golf tournament

Coordinates: 34.22°N 77.918°W

Tournament information
- Location: Wilmington, North Carolina
- Established: 1945
- Course: Cape Fear Country Club
- Par: 71
- Length: 6,575 yards (6,012 m)
- Tour: PGA Tour
- Format: Stroke play
- Prize fund: US$35,000
- Month played: November
- Final year: 1971

Tournament record score
- Aggregate: 270 Billy Maxwell (1955)
- To par: −18 as above

Final champion
- (United States) George Johnson
- Location in the United States Location in North Carolina

The Azalea Open Invitational was a golf tournament in North Carolina on the PGA Tour, held at Cape Fear Country Club in Wilmington. Last played in November 1971 as an unofficial event; it was an official PGA Tour event in 1945 and from 1949 through 1970. The Heritage in South Carolina debuted in 1969 and soon displaced it on the schedule.

It was also played under the names of the Azalea Open and the Wilmington Azalea Open; all were centerpieces of the city's Azalea Festival. Cape Fear was designed by noted course architect Donald Ross.

From 1950 through 1965, the Azalea Open was a tune-up event for the first major of the year, The Masters in Augusta, Georgia. Jerry Barber, the winner of the PGA Championship in 1961, won the Wilmington event three times (1953, 1961, 1963). Arnold Palmer won in 1957 and nearly repeated, falling by a stroke in an 18-hole playoff in 1958; the difference was a penalty stroke he called on himself.

Total prize money was initially $10,000, increasing to $12,500 in 1955 and $15,000 in 1958. It reduced to $12,000 in 1961 before increasing to $20,000 from 1962 to 1964. Prize money was $28,750 in 1965, $22,800 in 1966, $35,000 from 1967 to 1969 and $60,000 in 1970. The final non-tour event in 1971 had prize money of $35,000.

== Tournament hosts ==
- 1949–1971 – Cape Fear Country Club, Wilmington, North Carolina
- 1945 – Mobile Country Club, Mobile, Alabama

== Winners ==
Year	Tour (Note: PGAT − PGA Tour.)	Winner	Score	To par	Margin of victory	Runner(s)-up	Winner's share ($)	Ref.
Azalea Open Invitational
1971		(United States) George Johnson	274	−10	Playoff	(United States) Ralph Johnston	7,000	
1970	PGAT	(Mexico) Cesar Sanudo	269	−15	1 stroke	(United States) Bobby Mitchell	12,000	
1969	PGAT	(United States) Dale Douglass	275	−9	3 strokes	(United States) Jim Langley (United States) Larry Mowry (United States) Bob Stone (United States) Terry Wilcox	5,000	
1968	PGAT	(United States) Steve Reid	271	−13	Playoff	(South Africa) Gary Player	5,000	
1967	PGAT	(United States) Randy Glover	278	−10	Playoff	(United States) Joe Campbell	5,000	
1966	PGAT	(United States) Bert Yancey	278	−10	1 stroke	(United States) Bob Johnson	3,200	
1965	PGAT	(United States) Dick Hart	276	−12	Playoff	(United States) Phil Rodgers	3,850	
Azalea Open
1964	PGAT	(United States) Al Besselink (2)	282	−6	1 stroke	(United States) Lionel Hebert	2,700	
1963	PGAT	(United States) Jerry Barber (3)	274	−14	5 strokes	(United States) Larry Beck (Australia) Bruce Crampton (United States) Doug Ford (United States) Billy Maxwell (United States) Jack Rule Jr.	2,800	
1962	PGAT	(United States) Dave Marr	281	−7	Playoff	(United States) Jerry Steelsmith	2,800	
1961	PGAT	(United States) Jerry Barber (2)	213	−3	Playoff	(United States) Chandler Harper	1,200	
1960	PGAT	(United States) Tom Nieporte	277	−11	2 strokes	(United States) Gay Brewer	2,000	
1959	PGAT	(United States) Art Wall Jr.	282	−6	3 strokes	(United States) Mike Souchak	2,000	
1958	PGAT	(United States) Howie Johnson	282	−6	Playoff	(United States) Arnold Palmer	2,000	
1957	PGAT	(United States) Arnold Palmer	282	−6	1 stroke	(United States) Dow Finsterwald	1,700	
1956	PGAT	(United States) Mike Souchak	273	−15	1 stroke	(United States) Dick Mayer	2,200	
1955	PGAT	(United States) Billy Maxwell	270	−18	1 stroke	(United States) Mike Souchak	2,200	
1954	PGAT	(United States) Bob Toski	273	−15	3 strokes	(United States) George Fazio	2,000	
1953	PGAT	(United States) Jerry Barber	276	−12	1 stroke	(United States) Doug Ford (United States) Ted Kroll (United States) Johnny Palmer	2,000	
1952	PGAT	(United States) Jimmy Clark	272	−16	3 strokes	(United States) George Fazio (United States) Jim Turnesa	2,000	
Wilmington Azalea Open
1951	PGAT	(United States) Lloyd Mangrum	281	−7	1 stroke	(Australia) Jim Ferrier (United States) Ed Furgol (United States) Jim Turnesa	2,000	
1950	PGAT	(United States) Dutch Harrison	280	−8	2 strokes	(United States) George Fazio	2,000	
Wilmington Open
1949	PGAT	(United States) Henry Ransom	276	−12	2 strokes	(United States) Fred Haas (United States) Bob Hamilton (South Africa) Bobby Locke (United States) Cary Middlecoff	2,000	
Azalea Open
1946		(United States) Al Besselink (a)						
1945	PGAT	(United States) Sammy Byrd	283	−5	Playoff	(United States) Dutch Harrison	2,000	
