= Olympia Fields Country Club =

Private golf club in Illinois, US

Coordinates: 41.521°N 87.687°W

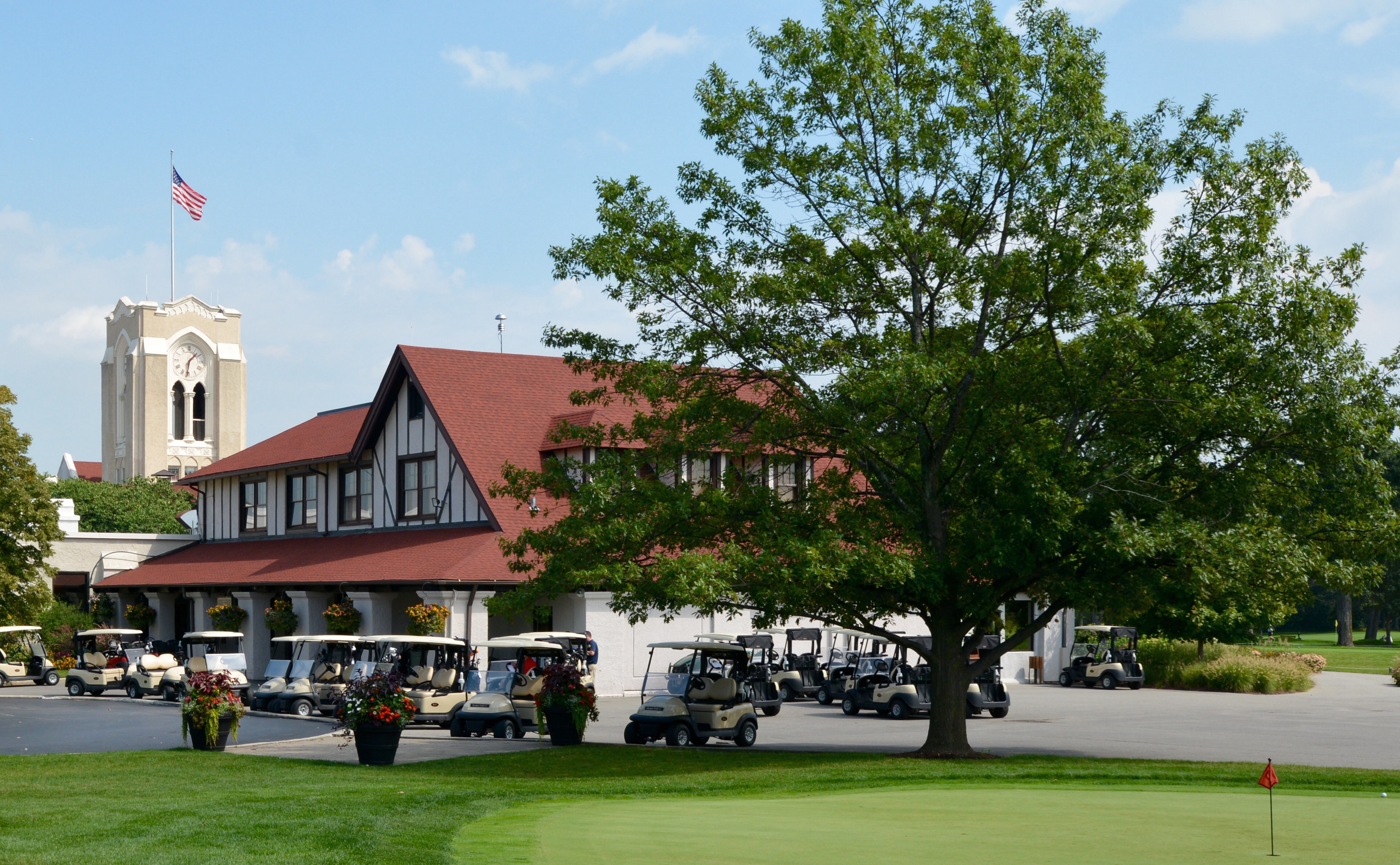
- Clubhouse in 2015

- Location in the United States Location in Illinois

Club information
- Location: Olympia Fields, Illinois
- Established: 1915, 111 years ago
- Type: Private
- Total holes: 36
- Tournaments: U.S Open (1928, 2003); PGA Championship (1925, 1961); U.S. Senior Open (1997); U.S. Amateur (2015); Women's PGA (2017); Western Open (5); BMW Championship (2020, 2023)
- Website: ofcc.info

North Course
- Designed by: Willie Park Jnr.
- Par: 70
- Length: 7,343 yards (6,714 m)
- Course rating: 76.6
- Slope rating: 150

South Course
- Designed by: Tom Bendelow
- Par: 72
- Length: 7,106 yards (6,498 m)
- Course rating: 75.0
- Slope rating: 146
- Olympia Fields Country Club
- U.S. National Register of Historic Places
- Nearest city: Olympia Fields, Illinois
- Built: 1915
- Architects: Bendelow, Thomas M.; Nimmons, George Croll, et al.
- Architectural style: Tudor Revival
- NRHP reference No.: 01000082
- Added to NRHP: February 9, 2001

Olympia Fields Country Club is a private golf club in the central United States, located in Olympia Fields, Illinois, a suburb of Chicago, about 25 miles (40 km) south of The Loop. It contains two eighteen-hole courses, North and South. The North Course is considered one of the top three courses in the Chicago area, and is generally ranked in the top 50 courses in the United States. The South Course is regularly ranked in the top ten in Illinois. Olympia Fields is one of the few private clubs in the U.S. with multiple courses ranked, and it is on the National Register of Historic Places.

== History ==
The club was founded 111 years ago in 1915. The first Club President was Amos Alonzo Stagg, the famous college football head coach and athletic director at nearby University of Chicago. The main dining room of the club is named in his honor. The North Course was designed by two-time British Open champion Willie Park, Jnr, and was lengthened prior to hosting the U.S. Open in 2003. It features some significant elevation changes, a meandering creek and hundreds of native oak trees. At one time it was one of four courses at the club, but after the club fell into financial difficulties during World War II, it was forced to sell off half of its land. Course No. 4 became the North Course, and the remaining holes from the other three courses were reconfigured to make the South Course. The Club excluded both Jews and Catholics for a period of time. Although in 1958 or so, two Catholic families were admitted.

Olympia Fields has hosted four major championships: two U.S. Opens (1928, 2003) and two PGA Championships (1925, 1961). It has also been the site of the U.S. Senior Open (1997) the U.S. Amateur (2015), and the 2017 KPMG Women's PGA Championship. In addition, the Western Open on the PGA Tour was played at the club five times.

Olympia Fields is famous for its enormous clubhouse, which was finished in 1925 at a cost of $1.3 million. It is a half-timbered English Tudor-style building with an 80-foot-high (24 m), four-faced clock tower that has become the trademark of the club. The western boundary of the property is bordered by a commuter rail line, Metra Electric District, and its Olympia Fields station is just west of the clubhouse; the line was previously the Illinois Central Railroad.

In March 1992, the club admitted its first Black members becoming one of the first traditional, old-line Chicago-area clubs to do so. The members approved were prominent businessmen Eric Johnson (formerly of Johnson Products Co.) and William Brazley (owner of an architectural firm), both recommended unanimously by the membership committee. This milestone was especially significant as many affluent Black families had already lived in the immediate area including adjacent to the course itself and also due to the fact that the club had previously rejected participation in national tournaments due to imposed minority membership guidelines.

In 2005, the club began a $9.5 million renovation project to improve the practice facilities, revamp some of the bunkers, and make other improvements. The club also has areas for swimming and tennis for members and their guests.

== Tournaments hosted ==
=== Major championships ===
Includes amateur and professional major championships

Year	Tournament	Champion	Winning score	Winner's share ($)
**1925**	PGA Championship	(United States) Walter Hagen	6 & 5	500
**1928**	U.S. Open	(United States) Johnny Farrell (Note: 36 hole playoff with Bobby Jones)	294 (+10)	500
**1961**	PGA Championship	(United States) Jerry Barber (Note: 18 hole playoff with Don January)	277 (–3)	11,000
1997	U.S. Senior Open	(Australia) Graham Marsh	280 (E)	232,500
**2003**	U.S. Open	(United States) Jim Furyk	272 (–8)	1,080,000
2015	U.S. Amateur	(United States) Bryson DeChambeau	7 & 6	n/a
2017	Women's PGA Championship	(United States) Danielle Kang	271 (–13)	525,000

- **Bolded years** are major championships on the PGA Tour.
- The PGA Championship was match play until 1958

=== Other tournaments ===
The Western Open was historically an important event in golf, a near-major.

Year	Tournament	Winner	Winning score	Winner's share ($)	Notes
1920	Western Open	(Scotland) (United States) Jock Hutchison	296		
1927	Western Open	(United States) Walter Hagen	281		
1933	Western Open	(Scotland) (United States) Macdonald Smith	282	500	
1968	Western Open	(United States) Jack Nicklaus	273 (–11)	26,000	
1971	Western Open	(Australia) Bruce Crampton	279 (–5)	30,000	
2020	BMW Championship	(Spain) Jon Rahm	276 (–4)	1,710,000	
2023	BMW Championship	(Norway) Viktor Hovland	263 (–17)	3,600,000	

== Scorecards ==
Olympia Fields North Course
Tee	Rating/Slope	1	2	3	4	5	6	7	8	9	Out	10	11	12	13	14	15	16	17	18	In	Total
2023 BMW	Championship	626	467	461	400	417	187	452	251	472	3,733	444	396	389	168	450	606	215	455	510	3,633	7,366
Black	M:76.6 / 150	626	467	461	400	417	187	452	280	472	3,762	444	396	389	168	450	576	215	455	498	3,591	7,353
Blue	M:74.9 / 146	550	440	439	378	401	179	425	206	460	3,478	429	380	389	168	438	559	196	413	445	3,417	6,895
White	M:73.0 / 141 W:78.7 / 146	525	426	409	362	359	164	400	189	438	3,272	410	358	377	150	420	544	175	373	419	3,226	6,498
Green	M:70.4 / 135 W:75.6 / 139	518	395	345	327	336	137	390	157	372	2,977	372	321	367	130	372	523	145	350	391	2,971	5,948
Par	Men's	5	4	4	4	4	3	4	3	4	35	4	4	4	3	4	5	3	4	4	35	70
SI	Men's	5	7	1	9	13	17	11	15	3		8	14	10	18	2	4	16	12	6
Yellow		486	340	327	311	238	121	310	144	372	2,649	341	298	282	122	322	453	130	292	358	2,598	5,247
Par	Ladies'	5	4	4	4	4	3	4	3	5	36	4	4	4	3	4	5	3	4	4	35	71
SI	Ladies'	3	9	7	11	13	15	1	17	5		8	14	10	18	6	2	16	12	4

Olympia Fields South Course
Tee	Rating/Slope	1	2	3	4	5	6	7	8	9	Out	10	11	12	13	14	15	16	17	18	In	Total
Black	75.0 / 146	459	482	182	543	243	375	566	409	440	3,699	500	345	212	415	150	430	365	460	530	3,407	7,106
Blue	73.8 / 144	433	420	171	524	210	361	566	409	440	3,534	500	331	200	395	150	430	365	440	530	3,341	6,875
White	72.0 / 139	396	403	152	517	183	337	540	390	400	3,318	478	331	170	380	135	382	342	411	503	3,132	6,450
Green	70.0 / 134	375	380	139	488	158	310	517	379	371	3,117	448	288	150	348	135	342	307	402	470	2,890	6,007
Par		4	4	3	5	3	4	5	4	4	36	5	4	3	4	3	4	4	4/5	5	36/37	72/73
SI	Men's	7	3	17	9	15	13	1	11	5		4	12	16	8	18	10	14	2	6
Gold		353	285	125	458	158	310	420	365	334	2,808	410	260	121	318	100	342	275	360	430	2,616	5,424
SI	Ladies'	9	7	17	3	15	11	1	5	13		4	12	14	10	18	6	16	8	2
