= Jerod Turner =

American golfer (born 1975)

Personal information
- Full name: Jerod A. Turner
- Nationality: United States
- Born: March 4, 1975 (age 51) Oak Harbor, Washington, U.S.
- Height: 5 ft 10 in (1.78 m)
- Weight: 200 lb (91 kg; 14 st)

Career
- Sport: Golf
- College: Weatherford College
- Turned professional: 2000
- Current tour: Web.com Tour
- Former tour: PGA Tour
- Professional wins: 3

Number of wins by tour
- Korn Ferry Tour: 1

Jerod A. Turner (born March 4, 1975) is an American professional golfer.

== Early life ==
Turner was born in Oak Harbor, Washington.

== Professional career ==
In 2000, Turner turned professional. He played on mini-tours until qualifying for the 2009 Nationwide Tour.

Turner won the inaugural Soboba Classic on the Nationwide Tour in 2009 and finished 15th on the money list to earn his 2010 PGA Tour card.

== Personal life ==
Turner lives in Hurst, Texas with his wife and two children.

== Professional wins (3) ==
=== Nationwide Tour wins (1) ===
No.	Date	Tournament	Winning score	Margin of victory	Runner-up
1	Oct 4, 2009	Soboba Classic	−15 (68-66-66-69=269)	2 strokes	(United States) Derek Lamely

=== Other wins (2) ===
- 2000 Waterloo Open
- 2004 Waterloo Open

== See also ==
- 2009 Nationwide Tour graduates
