= Roger Tambellini =

American professional golfer (born 1975)

Personal information
- Nationality: United States
- Born: March 11, 1975 (age 51) San Luis Obispo, California, U.S.
- Height: 6 ft 3 in (1.91 m)
- Weight: 180 lb (82 kg; 13 st)

Career
- Sport: Golf
- College: University of Southern California
- Turned professional: 1998
- Former tours: PGA Tour; Web.com Tour; NGA Hooters Tour
- Professional wins: 7

Number of wins by tour
- Korn Ferry Tour: 3
- Other: 4

Best results in major championships
- Masters Tournament: DNP
- PGA Championship: DNP
- U.S. Open: CUT: 2004, 2013
- The Open Championship: DNP

Roger Tambellini (born March 11, 1975) is an American professional golfer who has played on the PGA Tour and Web.com Tour.

== Early life and amateur career ==
Tambellini was born in San Luis Obispo, California. He played golf at the University of Southern California.

== Professional career ==
In 1998, Tambellini turned pro. He has won three times on the Nationwide Tour. His first win came at the 2003 Albertsons Boise Open, his second came at the 2005 Price Cutter Charity Championship, and the third came at the 2009 Ford Wayne Gretzky Classic. He has also won once on the NGA Hooters Tour in 1999.

Tambellini played on the PGA Tour in 2004 and 2006. He got his tour card for 2004 through Q-School but was not able to retain it after making only 12 of 28 cuts. He finished in 12th on the 2005 Nationwide Tour money list which earned him his PGA Tour card for 2006. Tambellini struggled in 2006 on tour, making only 7 of 25 cuts. In 2009, he finished 7th on the Nationwide Tour money list to earn his 2010 PGA Tour card.

== Professional wins (7) ==
=== Nationwide Tour wins (3) ===
No.	Date	Tournament	Winning score	Margin of victory	Runner(s)-up
1	Sep 21, 2003	Albertsons Boise Open	−17 (68-65-66-68=267)	6 strokes	(United States) Tripp Isenhour, (United States) Charles Warren
2	Aug 14, 2005	Price Cutter Charity Championship	−21 (65-70-67-65=267)	1 stroke	(Australia) Steven Bowditch, (United States) Troy Matteson, (United States) David Peoples, (United States) Vance Veazey
3	Jul 12, 2009	Ford Wayne Gretzky Classic	−20 (64-66-66-69=265)	4 strokes	(United States) Blake Adams

Nationwide Tour playoff record (0–1)

No.	Year	Tournament	Opponent	Result
1	2005	Cox Classic	(United States) Jason Gore	Lost to birdie on second extra hole

=== NGA Hooters Tour wins (1) ===
No.	Date	Tournament	Winning score	Margin of victory	Runner-up
1	Apr 25, 1999	Harrah's Casino Classic	−18 (60-70-66-66=262)	1 stroke	(United States) Scott Kammann

=== Other wins (3) ===
- 1999 Straight Down Fall Classic (with Michael Rowley)
- 2002 Straight Down Fall Classic (with Michael Rowley)
- 2007 Straight Down Fall Classic (with Michael Rowley)

== Results in major championships ==
Tournament	2004	2005	2006	2007	2008	2009	2010	2011	2012	2013
U.S. Open	CUT									CUT

Did not play

CUT = missed the half-way cut
Note: Tambellini only played in the U.S. Open.

== See also ==
- 2003 PGA Tour Qualifying School graduates
- 2005 Nationwide Tour graduates
- 2009 Nationwide Tour graduates
