= De Soto Open Invitational =

1960 golf tournament in Florida

Tournament information
- Location: Sarasota, Florida
- Established: 1960
- Courses: De Soto Lakes Golf & Country Club
- Par: 71
- Tour: PGA Tour
- Format: Stroke play
- Prize fund: US$35,000
- Month played: March
- Final year: 1960

Tournament record score
- Aggregate: 276 Sam Snead (1960)
- To par: −8 as above

Final champion
- (United States) Sam Snead
- Location in the United States Location in Florida

The De Soto Open Invitational was a golf tournament on the PGA Tour that was held from March 24–27, 1960 at the De Soto Lakes Golf & Country Club in Sarasota, Florida. The club is now known as Palm-Aire Country Club and is located at Whitfield Avenue and Country Club Way. The event was won by then 47-year-old Sam Snead.

== Winners ==
Year	Winner	Score	To par	Margin of victory	Runner-up	Winner's share ($)	Ref.
1960	(United States) Sam Snead	276	−8	1 stroke	(United States) Jerry Barber	5,300	
