= Mumford, Missouri =

Unincorporated community in Missouri, U.S.

Coordinates: 37°11′16″N 93°12′03″W

Mumford is an unincorporated community in Greene County in the U.S. state of Missouri. It is at the junction of Jones Branch and Pierson Creek, about 1.3 miles east of the current U.S. 65 bypass of east Springfield. The old St. Louis–San Francisco Railway (currently the BNSF Railway) passes just southwest of it. The old Mt. Pisgah School was located just to the north.

== History ==
A post office called Mumford was established in 1887, and remained in operation until 1924. The community has the name of the original owner of the site.

== Notable person ==
Leonard Dodson, a professional golfer, was born at Mumford.
