= Yorba Linda Open Invitational =

Golf tournament

Tournament information
- Location: Yorba Linda, California
- Established: 1960
- Course: Yorba Linda Country Club
- Par: 72
- Tour: PGA Tour
- Format: Stroke play
- Prize fund: US$20,000
- Month played: January
- Final year: 1960

Tournament record score
- Aggregate: 278 Jerry Barber (1960)
- To par: −10 as above

Final champion
- (United States) Jerry Barber
- Location in the United States Location in California

The Yorba Linda Open Invitational was a golf tournament on the PGA Tour that played only one time, January 15–18, 1960 at the Yorba Linda Country Club in Yorba Linda, California. The 6,834-yard, par-71 course was designed by David and Harry Rainville and opened in 1957.

The event was won by 43-year-old Jerry Barber by one stroke over Billy Maxwell.

== Winners ==
Year	Winner	Score	To par	Margin of victory	Runner-up
1960	(United States) Jerry Barber	278	−10	1 stroke	(United States) Billy Maxwell
