= Henry Ciuci =

American professional golfer (1903–1986)

Personal information
- Nationality: United States
- Born: April 25, 1903 Rye, New York, U.S.
- Died: January 1986 (aged 82)
- Height: 5 ft 6 in (1.68 m)
- Weight: 152 lb (69 kg; 10.9 st)

Career
- Sport: Golf
- Status: Professional
- Former tour: PGA Tour
- Professional wins: 6

Number of wins by tour
- PGA Tour: 6

Best results in major championships
- Masters Tournament: T25: 1934
- PGA Championship: T5: 1924
- U.S. Open: T6: 1928
- The Open Championship: DNP

Henry Ciuci (April 25, 1903 – January 1986) was an American professional golfer. He won six official PGA Tour events in the late 1920s and early 1930s, and was one of the Tour's most successful performers between 1928 and 1931.

== Professional career ==
Ciuci's best finish in a major championship was a tie for fifth place in the 1924 PGA Championship. His best effort in the U.S. Open was a sixth place tie in 1928. He finished T25 in the 1934 Masters Tournament.

Ciuci won two Tour events in 1928, and scored two second-place finishes. He had 11 finishes in the top-10 and 15 in the top-25 that season. In 1929, he won one Tour event, finished third three times, had eight finishes in the top-10 and 17 in the top-25. He had his best season in 1931, winning three times, one of which was the inaugural Connecticut Open. Also in 1931, he finished third twice, had eight finishes in the top-10 and 10 in the top-25. For his career, in addition to the six wins, Ciuci is credited with 53 top-10 finishes and 85 finishes in the top-25.

== Professional wins (6) ==
=== PGA Tour wins (6) ===
- 1928 (2) Florida Open, Norfolk Open
- 1929 (1) New England Pro Golfers
- 1931 (3) Fort Lauderdale Open, Coral Gables Open (tie with Walter Hagen), Connecticut Open

== Results in major championships ==
Tournament	1923	1924	1925	1926	1927	1928	1929
U.S. Open	58					T6	7
PGA Championship		QF					R16

Tournament	1930	1931	1932	1933	1934	1935	1936	1937	1938	1939	1940
Masters Tournament	NYF	NYF	NYF	NYF	T25	T45					
U.S. Open	WD	T29	T14	T15	T17	WD	CUT				CUT
PGA Championship	R32	R32									

Note: Ciuci never played in The Open Championship.

Top 10
Did not play

NYF = Tournament not yet founded
WD = Withdrew
CUT = missed the half-way cut
R64, R32, R16, QF, SF = Round in which player lost in PGA Championship match play
"T" indicates a tie for a place
