= 1961 PGA Championship =

Tournament information
- Dates: July 27–31, 1961
- Location: Olympia Fields, Illinois; 41.521°N 87.687°W
- Courses: Olympia Fields Country Club; North Course
- Organized by: PGA of America
- Tour: PGA Tour
- Format: Stroke play

Statistics
- Par: 70
- Length: 6,722 yards (6,147 m)
- Field: 161 players, 65 after cut
- Cut: 148 (+8)
- Prize fund: $64,800
- Winner's share: $11,000

Champion
- (United States) Jerry Barber
- 277 (−3), playoff
- Location in the United States Location in Illinois

The 1961 PGA Championship was the 43rd PGA Championship, played July 27–31 at the North Course of Olympia Fields Country Club in Olympia Fields, Illinois, a suburb south of Chicago. Jerry Barber, age 45, won his only major title in an 18-hole Monday playoff by one stroke over Don January, 67 to 68. It was the fourth edition as a stroke play event and the first playoff.

Rain washed out the second round on Friday afternoon with only about one-third of the field completing their rounds. The scores were scrapped and the second round was replayed on Saturday, with 36 holes on Sunday. Barber led at the midway point with a 136 (−4), two shots ahead of January and Doug Sanders. A top putter of the era, Barber sank 120 feet (37 m) of putts on the last three holes of the final round to erase a four-stroke deficit to January and force a Monday playoff. At the 72nd hole, January had a two-stroke lead, but put his tee shot into the sand. With Barber on the green but an improbable 60 feet (18 m) away, January played conservatively for the bogey. Barber drained his third lengthy putt in as many holes (birdie-par-birdie) to even it up at the end of regulation.

In the playoff, the two were tied at three-under after 16 holes, following January's birdie. Both had pars at the 17th, which effectively turned the 18th hole into sudden-death. Both tee shots found fairway bunkers, and Barber hit a 3-iron onto the green, 18 feet (5.5 m) from the cup. January found another bunker short of the green and could not save par from 15 feet (4.6 m).

At age 45, Barber became the oldest winner of the PGA Championship, whose previous champions were all under age 40, with several at age 39. At the time, the only older major winner was Old Tom Morris at age 46 in 1867. Barber was surpassed in 1968 by Julius Boros at age 48.

It was the third major championship at Olympia Fields Country Club; it previously hosted the PGA Championship in 1925 (Courses 3 & 4) and the U.S. Open in 1928 (Course 4). The four 18-hole courses at Olympia Fields were reduced to two in the 1940s when the club sold half of its property. Course 4 became the North course, and the South course is a composite of holes from the other three. The North Course later hosted the U.S. Open in 2003, won by Jim Furyk.

== Course layout ==
Hole	1	2	3	4	5	6	7	8	9	Out	10	11	12	13	14	15	16	17	18	In	Total
Yards	510	455	443	415	355	150	412	250	380	3,370	382	155	425	545	148	375	458	428	436	3,352	6,722
Par	5	4	4	4	4	3	4	3	4	35	4	3	4	5	3	4	4	4	4	35	70

== Round summaries ==
=== First round ===
Thursday, July 27, 1961

Place	Player	Score	To par
1	(United States) Art Wall Jr.	67	−3
T2	(United States) Jay Hebert	68	−2
T2	(United States) Ernie Vossler	68	−2
T4	(United States) Jerry Barber	69	−1
T4	(United States) Doug Ford	69	−1
T4	(United States) Bill Heinlein	69	−1
T7	(United States) Buster Cupit	70	E
T7	(United States) Don Fairfield	70	E
T7	(United States) Jack Fleck	70	E
T7	(United States) Paul Harney	70	E
T7	(United States) Shelley Mayfield	70	E
T7	(United States) Bob Rosburg	70	E
T7	(United States) Doug Sanders	70	E

=== Second round ===
Friday, July 28, 1961
Saturday, July 29, 1961

Play in the second round on Friday was ended by heavy rain in the early afternoon, with 54 of the 166 rounds completed. All scores were scrapped and the round was replayed on Saturday.

Place	Player	Score	To par
1	(United States) Jerry Barber	69-67=136	−4
T2	(United States) Don January	72-66=138	−2
T2	(United States) Doug Sanders	70-68=138	−2
4	(United States) Art Wall Jr.	67-72=139	−1
T5	(United States) Jay Hebert	68-72=140	E
T5	(United States) Ted Kroll	72-68=140	E
T5	(United States) Ernie Vossler	68-72=140	E
T8	(United States) Don Fairfield	70-71=141	+1
T8	(United States) Gene Littler	71-70=141	+1
T8	(United States) Bob Rosburg	70-71=141	+1

=== Third round ===
Sunday, July 30, 1961 (morning)

Place	Player	Score	To par
1	(United States) Don January	72-66-67=205	−5
2	(United States) Jerry Barber	69-67-71=207	−3
T3	(United States) Wes Ellis	71-71-68=210	E
T3	(United States) Ted Kroll	72-68-70=210	E
5	(United States) Johnny Pott	71-73-67=211	+1
T6	(United States) Paul Harney	70-73-69=212	+2
T6	(United States) Jay Hebert	68-72-72=212	+2
T6	(United States) Doug Sanders	70-68-74=212	+2
T6	(United States) Art Wall Jr.	67-72-73=212	+2
T10	(United States) Gardner Dickinson	71-71-71=213	+3
T10	(United States) Bob Goalby	73-72-68=213	+3

=== Final round ===
Sunday, July 30, 1961 (afternoon)

Place	Player	Score	To par	Money ($)
T1	(United States) Jerry Barber	69-67-71-70=277	−3	Playoff
T1	(United States) Don January	72-66-67-72=277	−3	Playoff
3	(United States) Doug Sanders	70-68-74-68=280	E	3,600
4	(United States) Ted Kroll	72-68-70-71=281	+1	3,100
T5	(United States) Wes Ellis	71-71-68-72=282	+2	2,209
T5	(United States) Doug Ford	69-73-74-66=282	+2	2,209
T5	(United States) Gene Littler	71-70-72-69=282	+2	2,209
T5	(United States) Arnold Palmer	73-72-69-68=282	+2	2,209
T5	(United States) Johnny Pott	71-73-67-71=282	+2	2,209
T5	(United States) Art Wall Jr.	67-72-73-70=282	+2	2,209

=== Playoff ===
Monday, July 31, 1961

Place	Player	Score	To par	Money ($)
1	(United States) Jerry Barber	35-32=67	−3	11,000
2	(United States) Don January	34-34=68	−2	5,500

==== Scorecard ====
Hole	1	2	3	4	5	6	7	8	9	10	11	12	13	14	15	16	17	18
Par	5	4	4	4	4	3	4	3	4	4	3	4	5	3	4	4	4	4
(United States) Barber	−1	−1	−1	E	E	E	E	E	E	E	E	−1	−1	−2	−3	−3	−3	−3
(United States) January	E	−1	−1	−1	−2	−2	E	E	−1	−1	−2	−2	−2	−2	−2	−3	−3	−2

Birdie	Bogey	Double bogey
