= Bob Stone (golfer) =

American golfer

Bob Stone (1930–1996) was an American professional golfer.

Stone played on the PGA Tour and Senior PGA Tour and worked as a club professional.

Stone played on the PGA Tour from 1968 to 1972 with a best finish of tied for second behind Dale Douglass at the 1969 Azalea Open Invitational. He played on the Senior PGA Tour from 1981 to 1987 with three second place finishes. In the 1981 U.S. Senior Open, Stone finished tied with Arnold Palmer and Billy Casper, but lost the resultant playoff to Palmer. He also finished second to Don January at the 1983 Citizens Union Senior Golf Classic and to Billy Casper at the 1984 Senior PGA Tour Roundup.

Stone was inducted into the Kansas City Golf Association Hall of Fame in 2014.

== Professional wins ==
This list is incomplete.

- 1958 Iowa Open
- 1959 Iowa Open
- 1960 Nebraska Open
- 1962 Iowa Open, Kansas Open
- 1963 Kansas Open, Nebraska Open
- 1966 Nebraska Open
- 1969 Midwest PGA Championship
- 1970 Florida Citrus Open Invitational (PGA Tour satellite event)
- 1975 Midwest PGA Championship, Missouri Open
- 1976 Midwest PGA Championship
- 1979 Midwest PGA Championship
- 1982 Midwest PGA Championship

== Playoff record ==
Senior PGA Tour playoff record (0–1)

No.	Year	Tournament	Opponents	Result
1	1981	U.S. Senior Open	(United States) Billy Casper, (United States) Arnold Palmer	Palmer won 18-hole playoff; Palmer: E (70), Stone: +4 (74), Casper: +7 (77)
