= Charley Hoffman =

American professional golfer (born 1976)

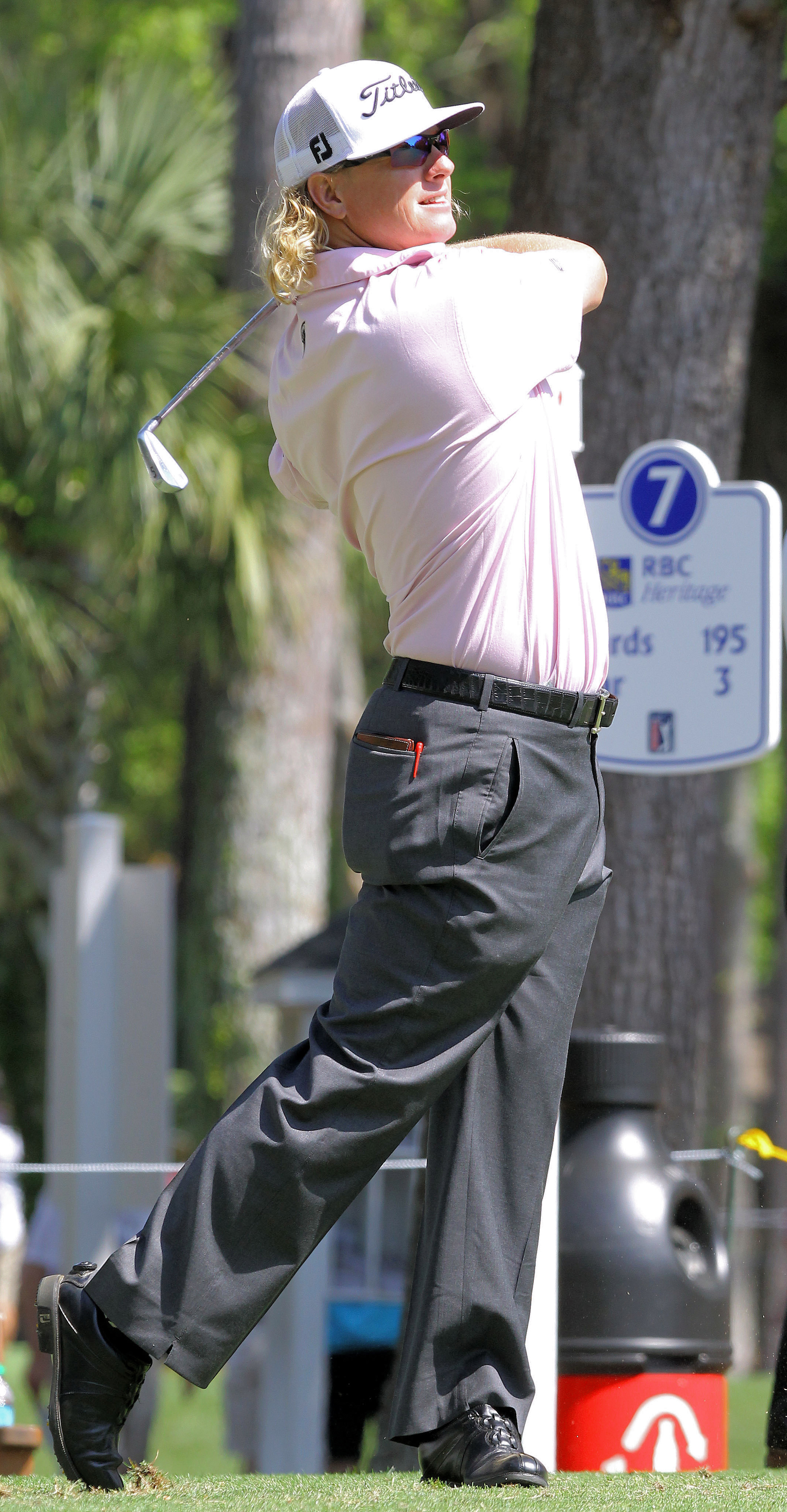
- Hoffman in 2012

Personal information
- Full name: Charley Lindley Hoffman
- Nationality: United States
- Born: December 27, 1976 (age 49) San Diego, California, U.S.
- Height: 6 ft 0 in (1.83 m)
- Weight: 200 lb (91 kg; 14 st)
- Spouse: Stacy Vasil (m. 2009)
- Children: 2

Career
- Sport: Golf
- College: University of Nevada, Las Vegas
- Turned professional: 2000
- Current tour: PGA Tour
- Former tours: Nationwide Tour; Gateway Tour
- Professional wins: 9
- Highest ranking: 20 (August 6, 2017) (as of October 25, 2026)

Number of wins by tour
- PGA Tour: 4
- Korn Ferry Tour: 1
- Other: 4

Best results in major championships
- Masters Tournament: T9: 2015
- PGA Championship: T17: 2021
- U.S. Open: 8th: 2017
- The Open Championship: T17: 2018

Charley Lindley Hoffman (born December 27, 1976) is an American professional golfer who plays on the PGA Tour.

== Early life ==
In 1976, Hoffman was born in San Diego, California. He won the California state high school championship in 1994 and 1995, becoming the first two-time winner. In 1995, Hoffman graduated from Poway High School. He qualified three times for the Buick Invitational as an amateur.

== Amateur career ==
In college, Hoffman was a member of the 1998 NCAA championship team at the University of Nevada, Las Vegas (UNLV). He was an honorable mention All-American in the same year. While at UNLV, his teammates included Chris Riley, Chad Campbell, Bill Lunde, and Adam Scott. He graduated in 2000 with a bachelor's degree in communications and turned professional.

== Professional career ==
=== Nationwide Tour ===
Hoffman struggled in his first year on the Buy.com Tour in 2000, only making four of 19 cuts. He had a better year in 2001, making 12 of 23 cuts including a top-10 finish. He only played in three events on tour in 2002, making one cut. He also played in three events on the European Tour where he finished tied for 5th at the Madeira Island Open and tied for 12th at the Qatar Masters.

Hoffman did not play on the renamed Nationwide Tour in 2003 but returned in 2004 and won his first professional event at the Permian Basin Charity Golf Classic. In 2004, Hoffman made 13 of 15 cuts and recorded two top-10 finishes and 10 top-25 finishes. Hoffman's breakthrough year on tour was 2005, making 18 of 26 cuts while recording a runner up finish, 8 top-10s and 12 top-25s. He earned $212,322 on the year and finished 19th on the money list, earning him his PGA Tour card for 2006. Hoffman won the 2005 Straight Down Fall Classic with Ed Cuff Jr.

=== PGA Tour ===
Hoffman made 21 of 29 cuts and recorded five top-10s and 10 top-25s. He finished tied for 46th at the 2006 U.S. Open, his first major. His best finish came at the Frys.com Open where he finished tied for fifth. Hoffmann earned $1,115,193 and finished 82nd on the money list.

Hoffman won his first event of the 2007 season at the Bob Hope Chrysler Classic in January. This victory lifted Hoffman into the top 100 of the Official World Golf Rankings. Hoffman won his first PGA tour event by defeating John Rollins after he birdied the first hole in a playoff. The rest of 2007 was mediocre for Hoffman though, on the year he made 18 of 30 cuts and recorded two top-10s and 7 top-25s. He earned $1,689,366 and finished 50th on the money list and the FedEx Cup standings. He finished tied for 35th in his first Open Championship and was cut from his first PGA Championship. He also finished tied for 7th at the Deutsche Bank Players Championship of Europe on the European Tour.

Hoffman made 19 of 29 cuts in 2008 and recorded three top-10 finishes and 6 top-25 finishes. His best finish came at the Shell Houston Open where he finished tied for 6th. He had his least successful year on tour, earning $945,702 and finishing 110th on the money list. The following year, Hoffman almost picked up his second win on Tour at the FBR Open in 2009 but he lost in a playoff to Kenny Perry. Hoffman recorded four top-10s and 11 top-25s in the 2009 season and finished a career high 41st on the money list.

Hoffman won his second PGA Tour event at the Deutsche Bank Championship in Boston. This victory helped Hoffman to finish 25th on the money list, the first time he finished inside the top 30. Hoffman came close to his third PGA Tour win at the Valero Texas Open finishing tied for 2nd with Kevin Chappell behind tour rookie Brendan Steele. Hoffman best finish was T-2 at the Travelers Championship, one stroke behind Marc Leishman. Hoffman's best 2013 finish was a T3 at the Valero Texas Open.

Hoffman captured his third career PGA Tour win on November 16, 2014, at the OHL Classic at Mayakoba. He shot rounds of 66-68-67-66 for a 17-under one-shot victory over Shawn Stefani and earned $1.098 million. In January 2015 he was runner-up at the Humana Challenge. In the spring, he finished ninth at the Masters Tournament, his best finish in a major championship to date. In May he finished tenth at the Crowne Plaza Invitational at Colonial and was runner-up at the AT&T Byron Nelson, and in July he finished seventh at the RBC Canadian Open. Hoffman won the Valero Texas Open in April 2016, for this fourth career victory, shooting a 3-under-par 69 in the final round. He defeated Patrick Reed by a single stroke.

On April 6, 2017, Hoffman shot a 65 in windy conditions to lead by four strokes after the first round of the 2017 Masters. His round consisted of nine birdies and is biggest lead after the first round of the Masters since 1941. He followed this up with a three over round of 75 in the second round to drop back into a four-way tie for the lead. Hoffman was in possession of the lead or co-lead for the majority of round three, until he found the water on the 16th, culminating in a double bogey. He finished with a level par round of 72, which left him two shots back of Sergio García and Justin Rose, entering the final round. He finished with a closing round of 78 in the final round to finish T-22. After losing by a fraction of a point to Kevin Chappell for the final guaranteed selection to the 2017 Presidents Cup, Hoffman was named a captain's pick. Hoffman reached a career high world ranking of 20th in 2017.

== Professional wins (9) ==
=== PGA Tour wins (4) ===
Legend
FedEx Cup playoff events (1)
Other PGA Tour (3)

| No. | Date | Tournament | Winning score | To par | Margin of victory | Runner(s)-up |
|---|---|---|---|---|---|---|
| 1 | Jan 21, 2007 | Bob Hope Chrysler Classic | 66-70-68-68-71=343 | −17 | Playoff | (United States) John Rollins |
| 2 | Sep 6, 2010 | Deutsche Bank Championship | 64-67-69-62=262 | −22 | 5 strokes | (Australia) Jason Day, (England) Luke Donald, (Australia) Geoff Ogilvy |
| 3 | Nov 16, 2014 | OHL Classic at Mayakoba | 66-68-67-66=267 | −17 | 1 stroke | (United States) Shawn Stefani |
| 4 | Apr 24, 2016 | Valero Texas Open | 66-71-70-69=276 | −12 | 1 stroke | (United States) Patrick Reed |

PGA Tour playoff record (1–3)

| No. | Year | Tournament | Opponent | Result |
|---|---|---|---|---|
| 1 | 2007 | Bob Hope Chrysler Classic | (United States) John Rollins | Won with birdie on first extra hole |
| 2 | 2009 | FBR Open | (United States) Kenny Perry | Lost to birdie on third extra hole |
| 3 | 2017 | RBC Canadian Open | (Venezuela) Jhonattan Vegas | Lost to birdie on first extra hole |
| 4 | 2024 | WM Phoenix Open | (Canada) Nick Taylor | Lost to birdie on second extra hole |

=== Nationwide Tour wins (1) ===
| No. | Date | Tournament | Winning score | To par | Margin of victory | Runners-up |
|---|---|---|---|---|---|---|
| 1 | Oct 17, 2004 | Permian Basin Charity Golf Classic | 72-67-71-71=282 | −6 | Playoff | (United States) Jeff Gove, (South Africa) Craig Lile |

Nationwide Tour playoff record (1–0)

| No. | Year | Tournament | Opponents | Result |
|---|---|---|---|---|
| 1 | 2004 | Permian Basin Charity Golf Classic | (United States) Jeff Gove, (South Africa) Craig Lile | Won with birdie on third extra hole |

=== Gateway Tour wins (3) ===
| No. | Date | Tournament | Winning score | To par | Margin of victory | Runner(s)-up |
|---|---|---|---|---|---|---|
| 1 | Jun 12, 2002 | Legend Trail & Wildfire | 65-68-69=202 | −14 | 1 stroke | (United States) Kris Cox, (South Africa) Marco Gortana |
| 2 | Jan 7, 2004 | Pacific Series 1 | 68-62-66=196 | −17 | 4 strokes | (United States) Justin Lee |
| 3 | Mar 18, 2004 | Maderas Irish Open | 65-68-63=196 | −20 | 8 strokes | (United States) Brian Kontak, (South Korea) Jin Park |

=== Other wins (1) ===
- 2005 Straight Down Fall Classic (with Ed Cuff Jr.)

== Results in major championships ==
Results not in chronological order in 2020.

| Tournament | 2006 | 2007 | 2008 | 2009 |
|---|---|---|---|---|
| Masters Tournament | | | | |
| U.S. Open | T48 | | | |
| The Open Championship | | T35 | | CUT |
| PGA Championship | | CUT | | CUT |

| Tournament | 2010 | 2011 | 2012 | 2013 | 2014 | 2015 | 2016 | 2017 | 2018 |
|---|---|---|---|---|---|---|---|---|---|
| Masters Tournament | | T27 | | | | T9 | T29 | T22 | T12 |
| U.S. Open | | T45 | | T45 | | CUT | T37 | 8 | T20 |
| The Open Championship | | CUT | | | T67 | CUT | 77 | T20 | T17 |
| PGA Championship | | CUT | CUT | T40 | CUT | CUT | CUT | T48 | CUT |

| Tournament | 2019 | 2020 | 2021 | 2022 | 2023 | 2024 |
|---|---|---|---|---|---|---|
| Masters Tournament | T29 | | | | | |
| PGA Championship | T54 | | T17 | | | CUT |
| U.S. Open | | | T57 | | T49 | |
| The Open Championship | T51 | NT | CUT | | | |

Top 10
Did not play

CUT = missed the half-way cut
"T" = tied
NT = No tournament due to COVID-19 pandemic

=== Summary ===
| Tournament | Wins | 2nd | 3rd | Top-5 | Top-10 | Top-25 | Events | Cuts made |
|---|---|---|---|---|---|---|---|---|
| Masters Tournament | 0 | 0 | 0 | 0 | 1 | 3 | 6 | 6 |
| PGA Championship | 0 | 0 | 0 | 0 | 0 | 1 | 13 | 4 |
| U.S. Open | 0 | 0 | 0 | 0 | 1 | 2 | 9 | 8 |
| The Open Championship | 0 | 0 | 0 | 0 | 0 | 2 | 10 | 6 |
| Totals | 0 | 0 | 0 | 0 | 2 | 8 | 38 | 24 |

- Most consecutive cuts made – 7 (2017 Masters – 2018 Open)
- Longest streak of top-10s – 1 (twice)

== Results in The Players Championship ==
| Tournament | 2007 | 2008 | 2009 |
|---|---|---|---|
| The Players Championship | T75 | CUT | T37 |

| Tournament | 2010 | 2011 | 2012 | 2013 | 2014 | 2015 | 2016 | 2017 | 2018 | 2019 |
|---|---|---|---|---|---|---|---|---|---|---|
| The Players Championship | T22 | T26 | CUT | T37 | T38 | T30 | CUT | T30 | CUT | CUT |

| Tournament | 2020 | 2021 | 2022 | 2023 | 2024 | 2025 |
|---|---|---|---|---|---|---|
| The Players Championship | C | T17 | CUT | | CUT | T54 |

Did not play

CUT = missed the halfway cut
"T" indicates a tie for a place
C = Canceled after the first round due to the COVID-19 pandemic

== Results in World Golf Championships ==
Results not in chronological order prior to 2015.

| Tournament | 2007 | 2008 | 2009 | 2010 | 2011 | 2012 | 2013 | 2014 | 2015 | 2016 | 2017 | 2018 |
|---|---|---|---|---|---|---|---|---|---|---|---|---|
| Championship | T61 | | T13 | | T24 | | | | T38 | T17 | | T20 |
| Match Play | | | | | R64 | | | | T17 | T38 | | T36 |
| Invitational | T22 | | | | T37 | | | | T31 | T33 | 3 | T53 |
| Champions | | | | | | | | | | | | T43 |

Top 10
Did not play

QF, R16, R32, R64 = Round in which player lost in match play
"T" = tied
Note that the HSBC Champions did not become a WGC event until 2009.

== U.S. national team appearances ==
Professional

- Presidents Cup: 2017 (winners)

== See also ==
- 2005 Nationwide Tour graduates
