= Iowa Open =

The Iowa Open is the Iowa state open golf tournament, open to both amateur and professional golfers. It is organized by the Iowa section of the PGA of America. It has been played annually since 1927 at a variety of courses around the state.

== Winners ==
- 2026 Mike Small
- 2025 Chris Naegel
- 2024 Matthew Meneghetti
- 2023 Alex Schaake
- 2022 Matthew Meneghetti
- 2021 Ryan Cole
- 2020 Chris Naegel
- 2019 Matthew Walker
- 2018 Dan Woltman
- 2017 Nyasha Mauchaza
- 2016 Nathan Stamey
- 2015 Adam Schenk
- 2014 Dylan Jackson
- 2013 Sean McCarty
- 2012 John Hurley
- 2011 Kevin DeNike
- 2010 Zack Vervaecke
- 2009 Vince India (amateur)
- 2008 Sean McCarty
- 2007 Jon Olson
- 2006 Cory Braunschweig
- 2005 Sean McCarty
- 2004 Derek Lamely
- 2003 Gary Rusnak
- 2002 Zach Johnson
- 2001 Zach Johnson
- 2000 Jeff Schmid
- 1999 Jamie Rogers
- 1998 Caine Fitzgerald
- 1997 Sean McCarty
- 1996 Gene Elliott
- 1995 Ken Schall
- 1994 Mike McCoy
- 1993 Kevin DeNike
- 1992 Dave Rueter
- 1991 Curt Schnell
- 1990 Mark Egly
- 1989 Kevin DeNike
- 1988 Ken Schall
- 1987 Kevin DeNike
- 1986 Mike Bender
- 1985 Gene Elliott
- 1984 Greg Tebbutt
- 1983 J. D. Turner
- 1982 Curt Schnell
- 1981 Bob Moreland
- 1980 Brad Schuchat
- 1979 J. D. Turner
- 1978 Curt Schnell
- 1977 Rufus James
- 1976 Bob Erickson
- 1975 John Frillman
- 1974 Joe Wall
- 1973 John Benda
- 1972 Karl Smith
- 1971 J. D. Turner
- 1970 J. D. Turner
- 1969 J. D. Turner
- 1968 Eddie Longert
- 1967 Bob Fry
- 1966 Joe Brown
- 1965 Joe Brown
- 1964 Steve Spray
- 1963 Ed Wysocki
- 1962 Bob Stone
- 1961 Clyde McIntire
- 1960 Dick Knight
- 1959 Bob Stone
- 1958 Bob Stone
- 1957 Wally Ulrich
- 1956 Ray Goodell
- 1955 Bob Asteford
- 1954 Joe Brown
- 1953 No tournament
- 1952 Neil Plopper
- 1951 Jim English
- 1950 Labron Harris
- 1949 Dick Turner
- 1948 Joe Brown
- 1947 Art Kock and Earnie Tardiff
- 1946 Leonard Dodson
- 1943–1945 No tournament
- 1942 Pat Wilcox
- 1941 Pat Wilcox
- 1940 Pat Wilcox
- 1939 Herman Keiser
- 1938 Joe Brown
- 1937 Leonard Dodson
- 1936 Clarence Yockey
- 1935 Johnny Dawson
- 1934 Jug McSpaden
- 1933 Denmar Miller
- 1932 Pete Jordan
- 1931 Bob McCray
- 1930 Art Andrews
- 1929 Denmar Miller
- 1928 Art Bartlett
- 1927 Art Bartlett
