= Jerry Barber =

American professional golfer (1916–1994)

Personal information
- Full name: Carl Jerome Barber
- Nationality: United States
- Born: April 25, 1916 Woodson, Illinois, U.S.
- Died: September 23, 1994 (aged 78) Glendale, California, U.S.
- Height: 5 ft 5 1/2 in (1.66 m)
- Weight: 137 lb (62 kg; 9.8 st)
- Spouse: Lucile Barber
- Children: 5

Career
- Sport: Golf
- Turned professional: 1942
- Former tour: PGA Tour
- Professional wins: 14

Number of wins by tour
- PGA Tour: 7
- Other: 5 (regular); 2 (senior)

Best results in major championships (wins: 1)
- Masters Tournament: T5: 1962
- PGA Championship: Won: 1961
- U.S. Open: T9: 1956, 1960
- The Open Championship: DNP

Achievements and awards
- PGA Player of the Year: 1961

Carl Jerome Barber (April 25, 1916 – September 23, 1994) was an American professional golfer who played on the PGA Tour. He had seven wins on tour, including a major title, the PGA Championship in 1961.

== Early life ==
Born in Woodson, Illinois, Barber was one of nine children raised on an Illinois farm near Jacksonville,

== Professional career ==
In 1942, Barber turned professional. Small in stature, he was one of the top putters of his era.

Barber was a full-time member of the PGA Tour from 1948 to 1962. He played on two Ryder Cup teams, 1955 and 1961; and was also the team captain in 1961. Barber earned a living primarily as a club professional like most of the touring pros of his generation; he worked at Los Angeles' Wilshire Country Club. He was the Player of the Year on the PGA Tour in 1961, unseating Arnold Palmer for a year.

At the 1961 PGA Championship in Illinois near Chicago, heavy rains wiped out Friday's second round and it had to be replayed on Saturday, followed by the final two rounds on Sunday. Barber led after the second round but trailed Don January by four shots with three holes to play in the final round. In high heat and humidity, Barber made a twenty-foot (6 m) birdie putt at the 16th hole, a forty-foot (12 m) par-saving putt at 17, and a sixty-foot (18 m) birdie putt at 18 to tie January and force an 18-hole Monday playoff. Due to the double-rounds and a lengthy delay caused by another rainstorm in the morning, Barber and January did not complete their final rounds on Sunday until well past 8 pm. Barber won the playoff the next day by a single stroke when January bogeyed the 18th hole. At age 45, he was the oldest player at the time to win a major title, surpassed seven years later by Julius Boros in 1968 at age 48.

Barber holds the record for the oldest player to ever play on the PGA Tour in February 1994, when he played in the Buick Invitational at Torrey Pines at the age of 77 years, 10 months, and 9 days. He died later that year, in September.

Often referred to in the media as "little Jerry Barber," he stood 5 ft 5 1/2 in (1.66 m).

== Personal life ==
Barber and his wife Lucile, who died as a result of cancer in 1968, had five children: Tom, Nancy, twins Sandra and Sally, and Roger.

Barber died in Glendale, California at the age of 78, after having mitral valve prolapse and suffering a stroke.

== In popular culture ==
In 1966, he portrayed himself in a guest appearance on episode #23 ("Watch the Birdie") of the television situation comedy I Dream of Jeannie.

== Professional wins (13) ==
=== PGA Tour wins (7) ===
Legend
Major championships (1)
Other PGA Tour (6)

No.	Date	Tournament	Winning score	To par	Margin of victory	Runner(s)-up
1	Apr 5, 1953	Azalea Open Invitational	71-65-72-68=276	−12	1 stroke	(United States) Doug Ford, (United States) Ted Kroll, (United States) Johnny Palmer
2	Aug 8, 1954	All American Open	68-70-70-69=277	−11	1 stroke	(United States) Gene Littler
3	Jan 18, 1960	Yorba Linda Open Invitational	67-70-69-72=278	−10	1 stroke	(United States) Billy Maxwell
4	May 8, 1960	Tournament of Champions	69-66-66-67=268	−20	4 strokes	(United States) Jay Hebert
5	Apr 2, 1961	Azalea Open Invitational (2)	71-71-71=213	−3	Playoff	(United States) Chandler Harper
6	Jul 31, 1961	PGA Championship	69-67-71-70=277	−3	Playoff	(United States) Don January
7	Mar 31, 1963	Azalea Open Invitational (3)	69-68-70-67=274	−14	5 strokes	(United States) Larry Beck, (Australia) Bruce Crampton, (United States) Doug Ford, (United States) Billy Maxwell, (United States) Jack Rule Jr.

PGA Tour playoff record (1–0)

No.	Year	Tournament	Opponent	Result
1	1961	PGA Championship	(United States) Don January	Won 18-hole playoff; Barber: −3 (67), January: −2 (68)

=== Other wins (5) ===
this list may be incomplete

- 1950 Pennsylvania Open Championship
- 1951 Waterloo Open Golf Classic
- 1952 Waterloo Open Golf Classic
- 1959 California State Open, Southern California PGA Championship

=== Other senior wins (2) ===
- 1987 Liberty Mutual Legends of Golf - Legendary Division (with Doug Ford)
- 1993 Liberty Mutual Legends of Golf - Demaret Division

== Playoff record ==
Senior PGA Tour playoff record (0–1)

No.	Year	Tournament	Opponents	Result
1	1985	Digital Seniors Classic	(United States) Lee Elder, (United States) Don January	Elder won with birdie on first extra hole

== Major championships ==
=== Wins (1) ===
Year	Championship	54 holes	Winning score	Margin	Runner-up
1961	PGA Championship	2 shot deficit	−3 (69-67-71-70=277)	Playoff^{1}	(United States) Don January

^{1}Defeated Don January in an 18-hole Monday playoff, 67 to 68

=== Results timeline ===
Tournament	1946	1947	1948	1949
Masters Tournament				
U.S. Open	CUT			CUT
PGA Championship				

Tournament	1950	1951	1952	1953	1954	1955	1956	1957	1958	1959
Masters Tournament				T21	T6	T56	T6	T26		
U.S. Open	CUT	WD		T30		CUT	T9	T35	T19	CUT
PGA Championship				R64	QF	R64	R32			T2

Tournament	1960	1961	1962	1963	1964	1965	1966	1967	1968	1969
Masters Tournament	T34	37	T5	CUT	48	CUT	CUT	CUT		
U.S. Open	T9	T34	CUT		CUT		CUT			
PGA Championship	T32	1	CUT	T40	WD	CUT	WD	CUT	CUT	CUT

Tournament	1970	1971	1972	1973	1974	1975	1976	1977	1978	1979
Masters Tournament										
U.S. Open	CUT				CUT		CUT			
PGA Championship	CUT	CUT	CUT	CUT	CUT	CUT	CUT	CUT		CUT

Tournament	1980	1981	1982	1983
Masters Tournament				
U.S. Open				
PGA Championship	WD			CUT

Note: Barber never played in The Open Championship.

Win
Top 10
Did not play

WD = Withdrew
CUT = missed the half-way cut
R64, R32, R16, QF, SF = Round in which player lost in PGA Championship match play
"T" indicates a tie for a place

=== Summary ===
Tournament	Wins	2nd	3rd	Top-5	Top-10	Top-25	Events	Cuts made
Masters Tournament	0	0	0	1	3	4	13	9
U.S. Open	0	0	0	0	2	3	18	6
The Open Championship	0	0	0	0	0	0	0	0
PGA Championship	1	1	0	3	3	4	26	8
Totals	1	1	0	4	8	11	57	23

- Most consecutive cuts made – 8 (1959 PGA – 1962 Masters)
- Longest streak of top-10s – 2 (1956 Masters – 1956 U.S. Open)

== U.S. national team appearances ==
- Ryder Cup: 1955 (winners), 1961 (winners, captain)
- Hopkins Trophy: 1954 (winners), 1955 (winners)
- Diamondhead Cup: 1974 (winners)

== See also ==
- List of men's major championships winning golfers
