= 2009 Nationwide Tour graduates =

This is a list of players who graduated from the Nationwide Tour in 2009. The top 25 players on the Nationwide Tour's money list in 2009 earned their PGA Tour card for 2010.

	2009 Nationwide Tour		2010 PGA Tour				
Player	Money list rank	Earnings ($)	Starts	Cuts made	Best finish	Money list rank	Earnings
(Australia) Michael Sim#	1	644,142	20	13	T2	65	$1,338,926
(United States) Chad Collins	2	415,114	26	18	T4	119	$815,961
(United States) Blake Adams*	3	399,749	26	15	T2	98	$963,593
(United States) Derek Lamely*	4	374,998	28	13	Win	95	$972,961
(United States) Tom Gillis	5	364,529	27	21	T5	76	$1,166,146
(United States) Chris Tidland	6	354,510	24	14	5	148	$588,291
(United States) Josh Teater*	7	326,438	31	19	T3	89	$1,005,323
(Australia) Cameron Percy*	8	320,715	25	11	T2	145	$620,262
(United States) Roger Tambellini	9	307,482	26	12	T4	171	$370,736
(United States) Matt Every*	10	300,936	18	12	T8	160	$456,847
(United States) Justin Bolli	11	284,537	23	4	T23	215	$73,990
(United States) Garrett Willis	12	269,856	24	18	T4	112	$871,763
(United States) Kevin Johnson	13	266,915	26	5	T38	216	$69,806
(South Africa) Garth Mulroy*	14	263,126	19	6	T6	181	$287,118
(United States) Jerod Turner*	15	237,993	21	8	T48	209	$91,343
(United States) Alex Prugh*	16	233,325	28	16	T2	70	$1,272,606
(United States) Jeff Gove	17	221,231	22	5	T32	208	$92,155
(Norway) Henrik Bjørnstad	18	218,652	26	9	T17	186	$215,913
(Canada) Chris Baryla*	19	217,680	7	2	T62	231	$24,254
(United States) Steve Wheatcroft	20	213,165	27	10	T3	166	$408,595
(United States) Rich Barcelo	21	199,975	25	10	T25	189	$188,892
(United States) Craig Bowden	22	198,208	20	8	T16	196	$140,935
(United States) Vance Veazey	23	193,243	23	6	T22	205	$111,370
(Sweden) Mathias Grönberg	24	191,743	22	8	T3	174	$322,130
(United States) Fran Quinn	25	191,467	7	2	T23	226	$45,096

*PGA Tour rookie in 2010
#Michael Sim received a battlefield promotion to the PGA Tour in 2009 by winning three tournaments on the Nationwide Tour in 2009. On the PGA Tour in 2009, he played in 3 tournaments and made 3 cuts, including one top 25. T=tied Green background indicates the player retained his PGA Tour card for 2011 (won finished inside the top 125).
Yellow background indicates the player did not retain his PGA Tour card for 2011, but retained conditional status (finished between 126 and 150).
Red background indicates the player did not retain his PGA Tour card for 2011 (finished outside the top 150).

== Winners on the PGA Tour in 2010 ==
No.	Date	Player	Tournament	Winning score	Margin of victory	Runner-up
1	Mar 15	(United States) Derek Lamely	Puerto Rico Open	−19 (69-71-63-66=269)	2 strokes	(United States) Kris Blanks

== Runners-up on the PGA Tour in 2010 ==
No.	Date	Player	Tournament	Winner	Winning score	Runner-up score
1	Jan 31	(Australia) Michael Sim	Farmers Insurance Open	(United States) Ben Crane	−13 (65-71-69-70=275)	−12 (73-62-70-71=276)
2	May 23	(United States) Blake Adams	HP Byron Nelson Championship	(Australia) Jason Day	−10 (66-65-67-72=270)	−8 (66-64-70-72=272)
3	Oct 17	(United States) Alex Prugh	Frys.com Open	(United States) Rocco Mediate	−15 (64-65-67-73=269)	−14 (69-66-66-69=270)
4	Oct 24	(Australia) Cameron Percy; Lost in three-man playoff	Justin Timberlake Shriners Hospitals for Children Open	(United States) Jonathan Byrd	−21 (66-63-66-68=263)	−21 (66-68-62-67=263)

== See also ==
- 2009 PGA Tour Qualifying School graduates
