= Colgate Champion of Champions =

Australian golf tournament

Tournament information
- Location: Melbourne, Australia
- Established: 1976
- Course: Victoria Golf Club
- Tour: PGA Tour of Australasia
- Format: Stroke play
- Month played: November
- Final year: 1977

Final champion
- (Australia) Bob Shearer

The Colgate Champion of Champions was a golf tournament held at Victoria Golf Club, Melbourne in Australia in 1976 and 1977. Prize money was A$150,000.

== Winners ==
Year	Winner	Score	To par	Margin of victory	Runner(s)-up	Winner's share (A$)	Ref
1977	(Australia) Bob Shearer	281	−7	1 stroke	(England) Maurice Bembridge (United States) John Benda (United States) Curtis Strange (Australia) Jack Newton	30,000	
1976	(United States) Mark Lye	276	−12	1 stroke	(New Zealand) Simon Owen	30,000	
