= Tom Pernice Jr. =

American professional golfer (born 1959)

Personal information
- Full name: Thomas Charles Pernice Jr.
- Nationality: United States
- Born: September 5, 1959 (age 67) Kansas City, Missouri, U.S.
- Height: 5 ft 10 in (1.78 m)
- Weight: 175 lb (79 kg; 12.5 st)

Career
- Sport: Golf
- College: UCLA
- Turned professional: 1983
- Current tour: PGA Tour Champions
- Former tours: PGA Tour; European Tour; Nike Tour; Asia Golf Circuit
- Professional wins: 13
- Highest ranking: 53 (July 2, 2006)

Number of wins by tour
- PGA Tour: 2
- PGA Tour Champions: 6
- Other: 5

Best results in major championships
- Masters Tournament: T17: 2007
- PGA Championship: T23: 2005
- U.S. Open: T13: 1989
- The Open Championship: T60: 2010

Thomas Charles Pernice Jr. (born September 5, 1959) is an American professional golfer who plays on the PGA Tour Champions. He previously played on the PGA Tour, where he won two tournaments.

== Early life and amateur career ==
Pernice was born in Kansas City, Missouri.

He attended UCLA, where his teammates on the golf team included Jay Delsing, Corey Pavin, Steve Pate and Duffy Waldorf. Pernice was a two-time All-American and Pac-10 Player of the Year in 1981. He majored in Economics and graduated in 1982.

== Professional career ==
Pernice won two PGA Tour events, his first coming in his 213th event. His best finish in a major is T13 at the 1989 U.S. Open. He is an advocate of the Jim Hardy one plane swing.

He turned 50 in September 2009 and played in his first Champions Tour event at the SAS Championship. He became the 15th player to win a Champions Tour event in his debut, defeating Nick Price and David Frost by a stroke. In 2009 and 2010, Pernice played sporadically on the PGA Tour, earning conditional status in 2010 and 2011 while concurrently competing on the Champions Tour.

Pernice rejoined the PGA Tour for 2012 after a third place tie at the Children's Miracle Network Classic moved him to 121st on the 2011 money list, after beginning the week as the fifth alternate and ranked 143rd. In his limited time, Pernice also finished 29th on the Champions Tour, earning him full status on both tours for 2012. Pernice earned over $14.9 million on the PGA Tour.

== Personal life ==
Married to Raquel Pernice January 14, 2023.

== Professional wins (13) ==
=== PGA Tour wins (2) ===
No.	Date	Tournament	Winning score	Margin of victory	Runner(s)-up
1	Aug 8, 1999	Buick Open	−18 (66-66-72-66=270)	1 stroke	(United States) Tom Lehman, (United States) Ted Tryba, (United States) Bob Tway
2	Aug 5, 2001	The International	34 pts (12-12-9-1=34)	1 point	(United States) Chris Riley

=== Other wins (5) ===
- 1994 Midwest PGA Championship
- 1995 Midwest PGA Championship
- 1996 Midwest PGA Championship
- 2004 Straight Down Fall Classic (with Ed Cuff Jr.)
- 2018 TaylorMade Pebble Beach Invitational

=== PGA Tour Champions wins (6) ===
Legend
Tour C'ships/Charles Schwab Cup playoff events (1)
Other PGA Tour Champions (5)

No.	Date	Tournament	Winning score	Margin of victory	Runner(s)-up
1	Sep 27, 2009	SAS Championship	−13 (67-67-69=203)	1 stroke	(South Africa) David Frost, (Zimbabwe) Nick Price
2	Aug 4, 2013	3M Championship	−17 (66-65-68=199)	1 stroke	(United States) Jeff Sluman, (United States) Corey Pavin
3	Jun 1, 2014	Principal Charity Classic	−12 (68-67-69=204)	Playoff	(United States) Doug Garwood
4	Nov 2, 2014	Charles Schwab Cup Championship	−11 (65-67-70-67=269)	Playoff	(United States) Jay Haas
5	Oct 30, 2016	PowerShares QQQ Championship	−13 (69-64-70=203)	1 stroke	(Scotland) Colin Montgomerie
6	Apr 28, 2019	Bass Pro Shops Legends of Golf (with (United States) Scott Hoch)	−23 (62-48-46=156)	5 strokes	(England) Paul Broadhurst and (United States) Kirk Triplett, (Paraguay) Carlos Franco and (Fiji) Vijay Singh

PGA Tour Champions playoff record (2–0)

No.	Year	Tournament	Opponent	Result
1	2014	Principal Charity Classic	(United States) Doug Garwood	Won with birdie on second extra hole
2	2014	Charles Schwab Cup Championship	(United States) Jay Haas	Won with birdie on fourth extra hole

== Results in major championships ==
Tournament	1986	1987	1988	1989
Masters Tournament				
U.S. Open	CUT			T13
The Open Championship				
PGA Championship				

Tournament	1990	1991	1992	1993	1994	1995	1996	1997	1998	1999
Masters Tournament	CUT									
U.S. Open	CUT						T94			
The Open Championship				T66						
PGA Championship										CUT

Tournament	2000	2001	2002	2003	2004	2005	2006	2007	2008	2009
Masters Tournament			T24					T17		
U.S. Open		CUT	CUT		CUT	T42	T21	T36		
The Open Championship						CUT	CUT	CUT		
PGA Championship	T27	T51		T45	CUT	T23	CUT	CUT	CUT	

Tournament	2010
Masters Tournament	
U.S. Open	
The Open Championship	T60
PGA Championship	

Did not play

CUT = missed the half-way cut
"T" = tied

=== Summary ===
Tournament	Wins	2nd	3rd	Top-5	Top-10	Top-25	Events	Cuts made
Masters Tournament	0	0	0	0	0	2	3	2
U.S. Open	0	0	0	0	0	2	10	5
The Open Championship	0	0	0	0	0	0	5	2
PGA Championship	0	0	0	0	0	1	9	4
Totals	0	0	0	0	0	5	27	13

- Most consecutive cuts made – 2 (four times)
- Longest streak of top-10s – 0

== Results in The Players Championship ==
Tournament	1999	2000	2001	2002	2003	2004	2005	2006	2007	2008	2009	2010	2011	2012
The Players Championship	CUT	CUT		T69	CUT	T72	CUT	T27	T28	CUT	CUT			CUT

Did not play

CUT = missed the halfway cut
"T" indicates a tie for a place

== Results in World Golf Championships ==
Tournament	2006	2007
Match Play		
Championship	T48	T11
Invitational		

Did not play

"T" = Tied

== See also ==
- 1985 PGA Tour Qualifying School graduates
- 1987 PGA Tour Qualifying School graduates
- 1996 PGA Tour Qualifying School graduates
- 1997 PGA Tour Qualifying School graduates
