= Haig Open Invitational =

Golf tournament formerly on the PGA Tour

Tournament information
- Location: Costa Mesa, California
- Established: 1968
- Course: Mesa Verde Country Club
- Par: 71
- Tour: PGA Tour
- Format: Stroke play
- Prize fund: US$110,000
- Month played: September
- Final year: 1968

Tournament record score
- Aggregate: 271 Bob Dickson (1968)
- To par: −13 as above

Final champion
- (United States) Larry Ziegler
- Location in the United States Location in California

The Haig Open Invitational was a golf tournament on the PGA Tour that was held in 1968 at the Mesa Verde Country Club in Costa Mesa, California. Bob Dickson, a 24-year-old Oklahoman, won the event by two strokes over Chi-Chi Rodríguez.

== Winner ==
| Year | Winner | Score | To par | Margin of victory | Runner-up |
|---|---|---|---|---|---|
| 1968 | (United States) Bob Dickson | 271 | −13 | 2 strokes | (United States) Chi-Chi Rodríguez |
