= Spring 1968 PGA Tour Qualifying School graduates =

This is a list of the Spring 1968 PGA Tour Qualifying School graduates.

The tournament was played over 144 holes at the PGA National Golf Club in Palm Beach Gardens, Florida in late April/early May. There were 81 players in the field and 15 earned their tour card.

== Tournament summary ==
The medalist was Bob Dickson, winner of 1967 U.S. and British Amateurs. In his third attempt, Mike Hill made it onto the PGA Tour for the first time.

== List of graduates ==
#	Player	Notes
1	(United States) Bob Dickson	Winner of 1967 U.S. Amateur and British Amateur
2	(United States) George Thorpe	
3	(United States) Jack Ewing	
4	(United States) Hale Irwin	1967 NCAA Division I Championship (individual champion)
T5	(England) Clive Clark	Winner of 1966 Danish Open
T5	(United States) Larry Hinson	1967 NCAA Division II Championship (individual champion)
T5	(United States) Joseph Porter III	
8	(United States) Mike Hill	
T9	(United States) Benson McLendon Jr.	
T9	(Japan) Hideyo Sugimoto	Winner of 1964 Japan Open and Yomiuri International
11	(United States) John Shackleford	
12	(United States) John Jacobs	
T13	(Canada) Kenneth Fulton	
T13	(United States) Jim King	
15	(United States) Dennis Rouse	
