= Bob Dickson =

American professional golfer (born 1944)

Personal information
- Full name: Robert B. Dickson
- Nationality: United States
- Born: January 25, 1944 (age 82) McAlester, Oklahoma, U.S.
- Height: 6 ft 3 in (1.91 m)
- Weight: 195 lb (88 kg; 13.9 st)

Career
- Sport: Golf
- College: Oklahoma State University
- Turned professional: 1968
- Former tours: PGA Tour; Champions Tour
- Professional wins: 5

Number of wins by tour
- PGA Tour: 2
- PGA Tour Champions: 1
- Other: 2

Best results in major championships
- Masters Tournament: T17: 1973
- PGA Championship: T25: 1969
- U.S. Open: T46: 1968
- The Open Championship: DNP

Achievements and awards
- Bob Jones Award: 1968

Robert B. Dickson (born January 25, 1944) is an American professional golfer who played on the PGA Tour and the Champions Tour.

== Early life ==
Dickson was born in McAlester, Oklahoma. He was introduced to golf at the age of five by his father, Ben, a club pro/manager at the McAlester Country Club, and later club pro at the Muskogee Country Club (1958–1978). He attended high school in Muskogee, and was the state 2A golf champion for three years.

== Amateur career ==
Dickson attended Oklahoma State University in Stillwater, Oklahoma, where he was a two-time All-American as a member of the golf team from 1964–1966. He graduated with a Bachelor of Science degree in General Business in 1967. That year he became the first amateur golfer since 1935 to win both the U.S. Amateur and British Amateur.

== Professional career ==
On January 25, 1968, Dickson turned 24-years-old. At his birthday party, it was announced he would turn professional. It was also announced he would enter the PGA Tour Qualifying Tournament that April for the Spring 1968 PGA Tour Qualifying School. The New York Daily News stated that "the pros rank the U.S.-British Amateur champ as a sure-pop star and the best to enter their ranks since Jack Nicklaus."

Dickson played on the PGA Tour for ten years and won two official events. During his rookie season in 1968, he won the Haig Open Invitational and the Bob Jones Award for distinguished sportsmanship in golf. His best year as a professional was 1973 when he won the Andy Williams-San Diego Open Invitational, earned $89,182, and finished in the top-30 on the money list. His best finish in a major championship was a T-17 at The Masters in 1973. Dickson was hired by the PGA as the Director of Marketing for the Tournament Players Club in 1979 and was also a Rules Official on the Senior PGA Tour (now known as the Champions Tour) from 1986–89. He was appointed as the Tournament Director for the Nike Tour in 1989 and was instrumental in its initial development.

After reaching the age of 50 in January 1994, Dickson began to play on the Senior PGA Tour. His sole victory in this venue came at the 1998 Cadillac NFL Golf Classic in a playoff with Jim Colbert and Larry Nelson. He last played in a Champions Tour event in 2004.

== Personal life ==
He lives in Ponte Vedra Beach, Florida.

== Awards and honors ==
- In 1968, Dickson was bestowed the Bob Jones Award by the USGA for distinguished sportsmanship in golf.
- On August 21, 2006, Dickson was inducted into the Oklahoma Sports Hall of Fame.

== Amateur wins ==
- 1965 Oklahoma Amateur
- 1966 Oklahoma Amateur, Broadmoor Invitational
- 1967 British Amateur, U.S. Amateur

== Professional wins (5) ==
=== PGA Tour wins (2) ===
No.	Date	Tournament	Winning score	Margin of victory	Runner(s)-up
1	Oct 27, 1968	Haig Open Invitational	−13 (68-65-69-69=271)	2 strokes	(United States) Chi-Chi Rodríguez
2	Feb 18, 1973	Andy Williams-San Diego Open Invitational	−10 (69-68-69-72=278)	3 strokes	(United States) Billy Casper, (Australia) Bruce Crampton, (United States) Grier Jones, (United States) Phil Rodgers

=== Other wins (2) ===
- 1966 Oklahoma Open (as an amateur)
- 1971 Oklahoma Open

=== Senior PGA Tour wins (1) ===
No.	Date	Tournament	Winning score	Margin of victory	Runners-up
1	Jun 28, 1998	Cadillac NFL Golf Classic	−9 (68-69-70=207)	Playoff	(United States) Jim Colbert, (United States) Larry Nelson

Senior PGA Tour playoff record (1–0)

No.	Year	Tournament	Opponents	Result
1	1998	Cadillac NFL Golf Classic	(United States) Jim Colbert, (United States) Larry Nelson	Won with birdie on first extra hole

== U.S. national team appearances ==
Amateur

- Walker Cup: 1967 (winners)
- Americas Cup: 1967 (winners)

== See also ==
- Spring 1968 PGA Tour Qualifying School graduates
