= Leonard Dodson =

American professional golfer (1912–1997)

Personal information
- Nationality: United States
- Born: March 29, 1912 Mumford, Missouri, U.S.
- Died: January 14, 1997 (aged 84)

Career
- Sport: Golf
- Status: Professional
- Former tour: PGA Tour
- Professional wins: 8

Number of wins by tour
- PGA Tour: 3
- Other: 5

Best results in major championships
- Masters Tournament: T10: 1937
- PGA Championship: T17: 1953
- U.S. Open: T43: 1940
- The Open Championship: DNP

Leonard Dodson (March 29, 1912 – January 14, 1997) was an American professional golfer.

== Early life ==
One of four boys, Dodson was born in Mumford, Missouri, and grew up in the Springfield area.

== Professional career ==
Dodson won three times on the early PGA Tour between 1936 and 1941.

During his colorful life, Dodson was known for gambling with his friend Titanic Thompson.

== Awards and honors ==
In 2004, Dodson was posthumously inducted into the Ozarks Golf Hall of Fame

== Professional wins (8) ==
=== PGA Tour wins (3) ===
- 1936 St. Petersburg Open
- 1937 Philadelphia Open Championship
- 1941 Oakland Open

=== Other wins (5) ===
- 1937 Iowa Open, Western Missouri-Eastern Kansas tournament, Hollywood Beach Hotel Open (Florida)
- 1946 Iowa Open
- 1948 Waterloo Open Golf Classic
