= Ed Cuff Jr. =

American golfer

Personal information
- Nationality: United States
- Born: August 15, 1961 (age 65) Temecula, California, U.S.

Career
- Sport: Golf
- College: San Jose State University
- Turned professional: 1984 (reinstated amateur 1994)

Ed Cuff Jr. (born August 15, 1961) is an American amateur golfer.

== Early life ==
Cuff was born in San Diego, California. He attended San Jose State University and was a member of the golf team until he graduated in 1984. Cuff turned professional right out of college in 1984 but did not find much success. He regained his amateur status in the early 1990s and continued his amateur career.

== Amateur career ==
In 1984, he was a quarterfinalist at the U.S. Amateur. He lost in the quarterfinals to eventual runner-up Sam Randolph.

After regaining his amateur status in 1994, Cuff won his first amateur event at the Southern California Golf Association (SCGA) Four-Ball Championship with Bob Clark. He won the event again with Clark in 2001. They were 1 of 3 teams to win the event twice.

Cuff was the 1994 California State Amateur runner-up after defeating Tiger Woods, 2 and 1, in the semifinals. It was Woods' only match-play loss of the summer. He won the 1998 California State Amateur, defeating Bobby Rodger, 5 and 4, in the 36-hole final match.

Cuff played in the SCGA's biennial Seaver Cup matches where, in 1998, he was part of the winning team.

Cuff was the 1999 California State Amateur co-medalist with Steve Conway, after they both shot 142 for 36 holes.

In 2002, he finished tied for second at the SCGA Mid-Amateur. He held a 9-stroke lead entering the final round, but could not hold on to it, finishing second. He was also a California State Amateur quarterfinalist in 2002.

Cuff won the Straight Down Fall Classic in 2004 with Tom Pernice Jr. and in 2005 with Charley Hoffman. The event combines teams of professionals and amateurs in a 36-hole stroke play event with the winners earning $25,000.

== Amateur wins ==
- 1994 SCGA Four-ball Championship (with Bob Clark)
- 1998 California State Amateur, Seaver Cup
- 2001 SCGA Four-ball Championship (with Bob Clark)

== Other wins (3) ==
- 1997 Straight Down Fall Classic (with Dennis Paulson)
- 2004 Straight Down Fall Classic (with Tom Pernice Jr.)
- 2005 Straight Down Fall Classic (with Charley Hoffman)
