= Ralph Terry =

American baseball player (1936–2022)

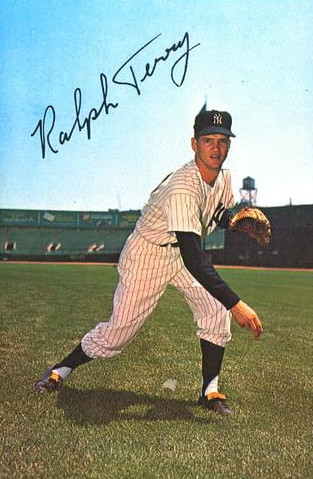
- Terry in 1964
- Pitcher
- Born: January 9, 1936; Big Cabin, Oklahoma, U.S.
- Died: March 16, 2022 (aged 86); Larned, Kansas, U.S.
- Batted: Right Threw: Right

MLB debut
- August 6, 1956, for the New York Yankees

Last MLB appearance
- April 22, 1967, for the New York Mets

MLB statistics
- Win–loss record: 107–99
- Earned run average: 3.62
- Strikeouts: 1,000
- Stats at Baseball Reference

Teams
- New York Yankees (1956–1957); Kansas City Athletics (1957–1959); New York Yankees (1959–1964); Cleveland Indians (1965); Kansas City Athletics (1966); New York Mets (1966–1967)

Career highlights and awards
- 2× All-Star (1962, 1962²); 2× World Series champion (1961, 1962); World Series MVP (1962); AL wins leader (1962)

Ralph Willard Terry (January 9, 1936 – March 16, 2022) was an American baseball player who played as a right-handed starting pitcher for twelve seasons in Major League Baseball (MLB). He played for the New York Yankees, Kansas City Athletics, Cleveland Indians, and New York Mets from 1956 to 1967. He was a member of the Yankees pitching rotation on five consecutive league champions from 1960 to 1964, enjoying his best season in 1962 when he was named to his only All-Star team, going on to lead the American League with 23 victories. In the 1962 World Series he was named the Most Valuable Player after posting wins in two of the last three games, including a 1–0 shutout in the decisive game seven. He is also notable for surrendering a walk-off home run to Bill Mazeroski that won the 1960 World Series for the Pittsburgh Pirates. Terry also played for the Kansas City Athletics, Cleveland Indians, and New York Mets. He later enjoyed a successful career as a professional golfer.

== Early life ==
Terry was born in Big Cabin, Oklahoma, on January 9, 1936. His father, Frank William, was employed as an attendant at Eastern Oklahoma Hospital and served in the US Navy during World War II; his mother was Laleta (Adams). Terry attended Chelsea High School in nearby Chelsea, where he played gridiron and basketball. He graduated as salutatorian of his class in 1953. He then studied at Missouri State University and the University of Kansas City. He was signed as an amateur free agent by the New York Yankees on November 19, 1953.

== Career ==
=== Baseball career ===
Terry played for the Independence Indians in the Ban Johnson League in 1953. The home field for the Independence Indians was Shulthis Stadium in Independence, Kansas. The stadium is the same venue in which Mickey Mantle started his career with the Independence Yankees in 1949.

Terry played two seasons in the minor leagues from 1954 to 1956. He made his MLB debut on August 6, 1956, at the age of 20, pitching 5 2/3 innings, striking out four, and being the winning pitcher in a 4–3 win over the Boston Red Sox. He ultimately posted a 1–2 win–loss record and a 9.45 earned run average (ERA) in three starts in his first MLB season. The following year, he appeared in seven games, making two starts, before being traded to the Kansas City Athletics on June 15.

Terry finished the 1957 season with a 4–11 record and 3.38 ERA in 19 starts for the Athletics. He rebounded somewhat the next season, going 11–13 with a 4.24 ERA and 134 strikeouts (setting a new career high) in 40 games, including 33 starts. In 1959, he started 2–4 with a 5.24 earned run average (ERA) in 9 games. On May 26 of that year, he was traded to the New York Yankees along with Hector Lopez.

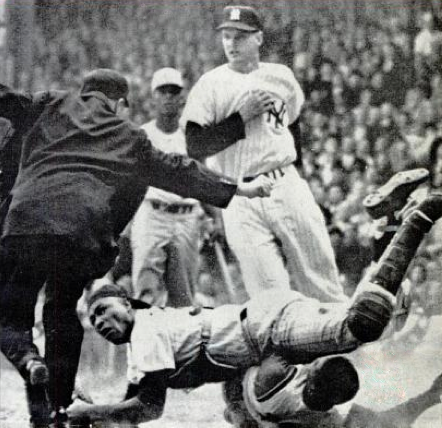
New York Yankees catcher Elston Howard looks at the call of umpire Jocko Conlan during the top of the 5th inning of Game 2 of the 1961 World Series, played October 5, 1961 at Yankee Stadium. Cincinnati Reds second baseman Elio Chacon slides into home safely on a passed ball, as teammate Vada Pinson and Yankee pitcher Ralph Terry look on. The run put the Reds up 3-2, and they ultimately would win their only game of the series 6-2.

Upon his return, Terry went 3–7 with a 3.39 ERA in 24 games, including 16 starts. His career began to take off in 1960, when he posted a 10–8 record and 3.40 ERA. That year, he made his first postseason appearance, in two games of the 1960 World Series. He was 0–2 with a 5.40 ERA in the two games, one start and one relief appearance, and gave up Bill Mazeroski's walk-off home run in Game 7.

In 1961, Terry posted a 16–3 record with a 3.15 ERA in 31 games (27 starts). During the 1961 World Series, he was 0–1 with a 4.82 ERA in two starts, but won his first championship when the Yankees defeated the Cincinnati Reds in five games.

For 1962, Terry went 23–12 with a 3.19 ERA. That year, he posted career bests with 23 wins, 39 starts, 298 2/3 innings pitched, and 176 strikeouts against 57 walks. His 23 victories led the American League. In the 1962 World Series, he went 2–1 with a 1.80 ERA and 16 strikeouts in 25 innings over three games against the San Francisco Giants. His performance earned him the World Series MVP award that season.

The next year, Terry was 17–15 with a 3.22 ERA in 37 games, including a career-high 18 complete games. He pitched three innings in the 1963 World Series against the Los Angeles Dodgers, finishing with a 3.00 ERA, as the Yankees were swept in four games.

In 1964, Terry went 7–11 with a 4.54 ERA. In the World Series that year against the Cardinals, he gave up two hits and struck out three batters in a Yankees loss.

Shortly after the 1964 World Series, Terry was sent to the Cleveland Indians as a player to be named later in an earlier trade for Pedro Ramos; Bud Daley was later sent to the Indians in November to complete the trade. In 1965, his only season in Cleveland, Terry posted an 11–6 mark with a 3.69 ERA in 30 games, (26 starts).

On April 6, 1966 he was traded for John O'Donoghue and cash to the Kansas City Athletics. He started 15 games for the Athletics, for whom he went 1–5 with a 3.80 ERA. On August 6, his contract was purchased by the New York Mets. He went 0–1 with a 4.74 ERA in 11 games, six as a reliever, for the rest of the 1966 season.

In 1967, Terry pitched in just two games, and finished one, before being released by the Mets on May 16. He subsequently retired.

In his career, Terry had 257 games started, 20 shutouts, 11 saves, 446 walks, and 1,000 strikeouts in 1,849 1/3 innings pitched.

In five World Series (1960–64), Terry posted a record of 2–3, 31 strikeouts and a 2.93 ERA in nine appearances and 46 innings pitched. Both wins came in the 1962 World Series against the Giants, including a 1–0 shutout in Game 7 over Giants ace Jack Sanford. That game – and thus the Series – ended with Yankee second baseman Bobby Richardson catching Willie McCovey's line drive.

He appeared at several Yankees Old-Timers' Days, most recently in 2017.

=== Golf career ===
After baseball, Terry became a professional golfer. He won the 1980 Midwest PGA Championship, and based on his status as a PGA of America sectional champion, he qualified for and played in four PGA Tour events in 1981 and 1982.

In 1986, he started playing on the Senior PGA Tour. His best finish was a tie for 10th at the 1989 Showdown Classic. In his retirement, he continued to play golf as a hobby.

== Personal life ==
Terry lived in Larned, Kansas, where he was in the insurance business for a number of years.

== Death ==
Terry died March 16, 2022, at a long-term care facility in Larned. He was 86, and suffered a head injury after slipping on ice on the morning of New Year's Eve 2021.

== Professional wins (1) ==
- 1980 Midwest PGA Championship

== See also ==
- List of Major League Baseball annual wins leaders
