= 2005 Nationwide Tour graduates =

Golfers graduating to PGA Tour

This is a list of players who graduated from the Nationwide Tour in 2005. The top 21 players on the Nationwide Tour's money list in 2005 earned their PGA Tour card for 2006.

	2005 Nationwide Tour		2006 PGA Tour				
Player	Money list rank	Earnings ($)	Starts	Cuts made	Best finish	Money list rank	Earnings ($)
(United States) Troy Matteson*	1	495,009	32	18	Win	36	1,778,597
(United States) Jason Gore#	2	356,579	29	14	T7	118	717,005
(United States) Chris Couch	3	337,205	27	10	Win	66	1,356,731
(Australia) Steven Bowditch*	4	333,329	22	2	76	256	11,160
(Canada) Jon Mills*	5	325,806	27	6	T42	227	65,494
(United States) Jerry Smith	6	267,757	29	17	5	137	568,213
(United States) David Branshaw	7	266,724	29	20	T4	119	706,346
(United States) Shane Bertsch	8	263,373	34	19	T7	123	697,059
(Australia) Mathew Goggin	9	260,090	26	10	T2	86	1,076,142
(United States) Kris Cox	10	257,352	28	12	T3	148	517,836
(Australia) David McKenzie*	11	253,174	28	12	7	160	425,228
(United States) Roger Tambellini	12	248,975	25	7	T21	212	116,685
(Colombia) Camilo Villegas*	13	233,218	29	18	T2 (twice)	38	1,742,112
(Australia) Greg Chalmers	14	233,063	28	8	T32 (twice)	203	151,265
(United States) Jason Schultz*	15	230,407	28	10	T24	204	147,424
(United States) Eric Axley*	16	227,997	29	16	Win	73	1,274,580
(United States) Vance Veazey	17	227,635	20	10	T23	191	207,077
(Australia) Nathan Green*	18	217,272	30	24	T2	41	1,700,803
(United States) Charley Hoffman*	19	212,322	29	21	T5	82	1,115,193
(United States) Jeff Gove	20	210,674	29	16	T6	107	793,477
(United States) Bubba Watson*	21	202,437	27	15	T3	90	1,019,264

*PGA Tour rookie for 2006.
#Gore received a battlefield promotion to the PGA Tour in 2005 by winning three tournaments on the Nationwide Tour in 2005. On the PGA Tour in 2005, he played in 8 tournaments, making 6 cuts and winning the 84 Lumber Classic.
T = Tied
Green background indicates the player retained his PGA Tour card for 2007 (won or finished inside the top 125).
Yellow background indicates the player did not retain his PGA Tour card for 2007, but retained conditional status (finished between 126–150).
Red background indicates the player did not retain his PGA Tour card for 2007 (finished outside the top 150).

== Winners on the PGA Tour in 2006 ==
No.	Date	Player	Tournament	Winning score	Margin of victory	Runners-up
1	Apr 30	(United States) Chris Couch	Zurich Classic of New Orleans	−19 (70-70-68-65=269)	1 stroke	(United States) Fred Funk, (United States) Charles Howell III
2	Sep 24	(United States) Eric Axley	Valero Texas Open	−15 (68-63-63-71=265)	3 strokes	(United States) Anthony Kim, (England) Justin Rose, (United States) Dean Wilson
3	Oct 15	(United States) Troy Matteson	Frys.com Open	−22 (67-65-64-69=265)	1 stroke	(Sweden) Daniel Chopra, (United States) Ben Crane

== Runners-up on the PGA Tour in 2006 ==
No.	Date	Player	Tournament	Winner	Winning score	Runner-up score
1	Jan 29	(Australia) Nathan Green lost in three-man playoff	Buick Invitational	(United States) Tiger Woods	−10 (71-68-67-72=278)	−10 (67-70-69-72=278)
2	Feb 5	(Colombia) Camilo Villegas	FBR Open	(United States) J. B. Holmes	−21 (68-64-65-66=263)	−14 (68-67-66-69=270)
3	Mar 5	(Colombia) Camilo Villegas (2)	Ford Championship at Doral	(United States) Tiger Woods	−20 (64-67-68-69=268)	−19 (65-66-71-67=269)
4	Jul 9	(Australia) Mathew Goggin	Cialis Western Open	(South Africa) Trevor Immelman	−13 (69-66-69-67=271)	−11 (69-69-66-69=273)
5	Oct 22	(United States) Troy Matteson	FUNAI Classic at the Walt Disney World Resort	(United States) Joe Durant	−25 (69-65-64-65=263)	−21 (67-65-65-70=267)

== See also ==
- 2005 PGA Tour Qualifying School graduates
