= Midwest PGA Championship =

Golf tournament

The Midwest PGA Championship is a golf tournament that is the championship of the Midwest section of the PGA of America. The section was formed in 1924, encompassing the states of Missouri and Kansas. Records kept by the section track winners back to 1960. It is unclear whether there were championship tournaments held before that time. Sam Reynolds, club pro from Kansas City, Missouri holds the record with most victories, winning five championships in the 1960s. Two-time PGA Tour winner Tom Pernice Jr. won the title three straight years, from 1994–96. Former New York Yankees pitcher Ralph Terry won the 1980 tournament after he retired from his baseball career.

== Winners ==
- 2026 Robert Russell
- 2025 Austin Jarchow
- 2024 Robert Russell
- 2023 Austin Hardison
- 2022 Robert Russell
- 2021 Robert Russell
- 2020 Robert Russell
- 2019 Scott Wempe
- 2018 Rob Wilkin
- 2017 Bryan Daniels
- 2016 Rob Wilkin
- 2015 Sean Dougherty
- 2014 Bryan Daniels
- 2013 Blake Graham
- 2012 Matt Seitz
- 2011 Sean Dougherty
- 2010 Sean Dougherty
- 2009 Blake Graham
- 2008 Steve Gotsche
- 2007 John Richman
- 2006 Rob Wilkin
- 2005 Matt Seitz
- 2004 Rob Wilkin
- 2003 Jim Kane
- 2002 James Farrell
- 2001 Rob Wilkin
- 2000 Matt Seitz
- 1999 Dan Key
- 1998 Rob Wilkin
- 1997 Rob Wilkin
- 1996 Tom Pernice Jr.
- 1995 Tom Pernice Jr.
- 1994 Tom Pernice Jr.
- 1993 John Sherman
- 1992 Bryan Norton
- 1991 Billy Peterson
- 1990 Rob Wilkin
- 1989 Brad Sater
- 1988 Rob Wilkin
- 1987 Ross Randall
- 1986 Billy Peterson
- 1985 Tom Dawson
- 1984 Ray Streeter
- 1983 Randy Towner
- 1982 Bob Stone
- 1981 Perry Leslie
- 1980 Ralph Terry
- 1979 Bob Stone
- 1978 Gary Clark
- 1977 John Bonella
- 1976 Bob Stone
- 1975 Bob Stone
- 1974 Jim Davis
- 1973 Brien Boggess
- 1972 Everett Vinzant
- 1971 Stan Thirsk
- 1970 Stan Thirsk
- 1969 Bob Stone
- 1968 Herman Scharlau
- 1967 Everett Vinzant
- 1966 Sam Reynolds
- 1965 Sam Reynolds
- 1964 Sam Reynolds
- 1963 Herman Scharlau
- 1962 Joe Jimenez
- 1961 Sam Reynolds
- 1960 Sam Reynolds
