= Steve Reid (golfer) =

American professional golfer

Personal information
- Full name: Steven Reid
- Nationality: United States
- Born: July 27, 1936 (age 90) Santa Barbara, California
- Height: 6 ft 0 in (1.83 m)
- Weight: 185 lb (84 kg; 13.2 st)
- Spouse: Donna Johnson

Career
- Sport: Golf
- Turned professional: 1956
- Former tours: PGA Tour; Champions Tour
- Professional wins: 1

Number of wins by tour
- PGA Tour: 1

Best results in major championships
- Masters Tournament: DNP
- PGA Championship: T26: 1968
- U.S. Open: CUT: 1965, 1970
- The Open Championship: DNP

Steven Reid (born July 27, 1936) is an American professional golfer who played on the PGA Tour and the Senior PGA Tour.

== Career ==
Reid was born in Santa Barbara, California. Reid defeated Gary Player on the second extra hole in a playoff at the 1968 Azalea Open Invitational for his first and only PGA Tour win. His best finish in a major was T-26 at the 1968 PGA Championship.

== Professional wins (1) ==
=== PGA Tour wins (1) ===
No.	Date	Tournament	Winning score	Margin of victory	Runner-up
1	Apr 21, 1968	Azalea Open Invitational	−13 (65-71-66-69=271)	Playoff	(South Africa) Gary Player

PGA Tour playoff record (1–0)

No.	Year	Tournament	Opponent	Result
1	1968	Azalea Open Invitational	(South Africa) Gary Player	Won with birdie on second extra hole
