= John Benda =

American golfer (born 1947)

Personal information
- Nationality: United States
- Born: July 9, 1947 (age 79) Sheridan, Wyoming, U.S.
- Height: 5 ft 9 in (1.75 m)
- Weight: 168 lb (76 kg; 12.0 st)

Career
- Sport: Golf
- Turned professional: 1971
- Current tour: European Seniors Tour
- Professional wins: 2

Best results in major championships
- Masters Tournament: DNP
- PGA Championship: DNP
- U.S. Open: DNP
- The Open Championship: CUT: 1979, 1980

John Benda (born July 9, 1947) is an American professional golfer playing on the European Seniors Tour.

== Early life ==
Benda was born in Sheridan, Wyoming.

== Professional career ==
In 1971, Benda turned professional. He played extensively overseas on the Asia Golf Circuit and PGA Tour of Australasia. One of his best finishes in Australia was a runner-up finish at the 1977 Colgate Champion of Champions. He finished one behind Bob Shearer and tied, among others, Curtis Strange for second place. He twice qualified for The Open Championship (1979 and 1980) with his best finish being two strokes behind the third round cut in 1980. After his regular playing days were over he went on to become an administrator on the Asian and South American Tours.

After he turned 50, Benda decided to play the senior tours. In 2007, he enjoyed his best year competing on the European Senior Tour. He was runner-up at the Sharp Italian Seniors Open in May, helped by his lowest ever senior round, a nine-under-par 63 in the second round, besting the course record set by Arnold Palmer, to collect his biggest prize: €15,000. A tied 13th finish at the Bad Ragaz PGA Seniors Open gave him his next best result of the campaign. He finished in 59th place on the Order of Merit in 2006 and just like in 2005. He returned to the Qualifying School to secure a conditional card.

== Personal life ==
Benda is married to Veronica, a native of Chile, and they have no children. He currently resides in Phoenix, Arizona.

== Professional wins ==
this list may be incomplete

- 1973 Iowa Open
- 1985 Waterloo Open Golf Classic

== Playoff record ==
European Seniors Tour playoff record (0–1)

No.	Year	Tournament	Opponents	Result
1	2007	Sharp Italian Seniors Open	(England) Tony Allen, (England) Carl Mason, (New Zealand) Simon Owen	Owen won with birdie on first extra hole

== Awards and honors ==
- In 2019, Benda was elected to the Iowa Golf Hall of Fame.
