= Waterloo Open Golf Classic =

Iowa golf tournament

The Waterloo Jaycees Greater Waterloo Open Golf Classic is the oldest and largest golf tournament in the state of Iowa. It has been played annually since 1934, and celebrated its 75th anniversary in 2009. It is traditionally played over the course of third week/weekend in the month of July.

The tournament actually consists of five separate tournaments which are organized and run simultaneously by a volunteer committee of Waterloo Jaycees. The tournaments are played on the three public golf courses in Waterloo, Iowa.

== Don Narveson Memorial Youth Golf Clinic ==
The Waterloo Open has become nearly a week-long event, and kicks off annually with the Don Narveson Memorial Youth Golf Clinic. The Youth Clinic takes place at South Hills Golf Course on Wednesday morning of the week of the event. Local youth interested in becoming more acquainted with the game of golf (as well as those who already play) can receive one-on-one interaction with golf professionals to refine their swing, receive putting instruction, and learn basic golf etiquette.

== Pro-Am Tournament ==
The tournament itself begins on Thursday morning, when the Pro-Am tournament begins at Irv Warren Memorial golf course. The Waterloo Open receives sponsorship from many local and national businesses, and these sponsors' generosity is repaid partially by being invited to play a round of golf with a professional golfer. Groups of 5 (one professional with 4 amateurs/sponsors) tee it up on either Thursday or Friday.

The professionals compete against each other for a special Pro-Am tournament purse. For those professionals who may not have played in the Waterloo Open before, the Pro-Am tournament serves as a practice round played on the course on which they will compete later that weekend in a competitive environment.

The amateur/sponsor groups also compete for nominal gift certificate prizes awarded to the best overall teams.

== Amateur tournament ==
The Amateur and Senior Amateur tournaments begin on Friday the week of the event. The amateur field consists of 272 golfers, one half of which play at South Hills Golf Course on Friday, while the other one half play at Gates Park Golf Course. The groups switch courses on Saturday and play a second round of golf. After Saturday's round, the top 36 amateur golfers (and ties), along with the top 4 senior amateur golfers (and ties) make the cut and are invited to play a third championship round along with the professional golfers on Sunday at Irv Warren Golf Course. The amateur with the lowest combined 3-day score is the champion and receives a prize in the form of gift certificates redeemable at the local golf course pro shops.

== Professional tournament ==
The main events of the Waterloo Open are the Professional and Senior Professional golf tournaments. 192 professionals compete in a one-day qualifying "shoot-out" on Saturday at Irv Warren Golf Course. After Saturday's round, a cut is made and the top 60 golfers in the Open division, as well as the top 20 golfers in the senior division, play a second round on Sunday for the championship.

Because of the Waterloo Open's relatively large top prize compared to other tournaments of its size ($40,000 to the golfer who wins in 2008) and its reputation as running hospitable tournaments among professional golfers, it attracts up-and-coming young golfers from all over the country. Golfers who have competed in the Waterloo Open include current PGA professionals Zach Johnson, Woody Austin, Tom Lehman, and George McNeill.

== Winners ==
Year	Professional	Amateur
2026	Matthew Watkins	Jonathan Feldick
2025	Cody Banach	Drew Hensen
2024	Trevor Ullestad	Mikey Takacs
2023	Evan Brown	Owen Sawyer
2022	Will Dickson	Jack Moody
2021	Michael Visacki	Trent Lindenman
2020	Canceled due to the COVID-19 pandemic	Nate Vance
2019	Chandler Blanchet	Jonathan Feldick
2018	Richard Schembechler	Dusty Drenth
2017	Austin Quick	Alex Schaake
2016	Tom Whitney	Alex Higgs
2015	Tom Whitney	Carson Schaake
2014	Donald Constable	Carson Schaake
2013	Mark Blakefield	Ricky Hearden
2012	Ryan Blaum	Ben Juffer
2011	Nate Lashley	Gene Elliott
2010	Nate Lashley	Justin Weber
2009	Andy Winings	Kyle Bermel
2008	Derek Lamely	Cole Peevler
2007	Jay Reynolds	Keith Jungen
2006	Scott Hart	Jamie Frazier
2005	Brett Melton	Matt Lowe
2004	Jerod Turner	Matt Steddom
2003	Steve Friesen	Marc Cahalan
2002	Jon Troutman	Matt Willmott
2001	George McNeill	Brock Mulder
2000	Jerod Turner	KC Doland
1999	Brad Klapprott	Ryan Smith
1998	Sean McCarty	Cory Braunschweig
1997	Jeff Schmid	Dave Narveson
1996	Jeff Schmid	Nate Lubs
1995	Patrick Moore	Paul Wurtz
1994	Darrell Chivington	Scott Brauer
1993	Woody Austin	Scott Brauer
1992	Tom Gillis	John Berg
1991	Jerry Smith	Curt Berggren
1990	Ty Armstrong	Bill Hoefle
1989	Skip Holton	Nick De Kock
1988	Skip Holton	John Dinnebier
1987	Clark Burroughs	John Dinnebier
1986	Tom Lehman	Brad Clark
1985	John Benda	Mike Ketchum
1984	Tony Cerda	Scott Morgensen
1983	Mike Bender	Chris Donielson
1982	Bill Sakas	Todd Hintgen
1981	Curt Schnell	Doug Dunakey
1980	Tom Sieckmann	Steve Statton
1979	Lonnie Nielsen	Jim Scheppele
1978	John Jacobs	Jeff Smith
1977	Slugger White	Steve Kehrer and Jeff Smith
1976	Dick Orr	Tom VanGerpen
1975	Mac McLendon	Lonnie Nielsen
1974	Jack Rule, Jr.	Steve Kehrer
1973	Roger Buhrt	Lonnie Nielsen
1972	Bob Panasik	Tom Chapman
1971	Jerry Abbott	Bill Heldmar
1970	Curtis Sifford	Ron Worthington
1969	Jack Rule, Jr.	Bill O'Connor
1968	Cliff Brown	Joe Heinz
1967	Frank Beard	Bill Hird Jr.
1966	Steve Spray	Ralph Compiano
1965	Rex Baxter	Jerry Heinz
1964	Bob Harrison	Ev Scheppele
1963	Ron Letellier	Jim Scheppele
1962	Bob Shields	Queston Boston
1961	Joe Moore, Jr.	Jim Jamieson
1960	Joe Brown	Queston Boston
1959	Jack Ellis	Jack Rule, Jr.
1958	Labron Harris	Jack Rule, Jr.
1957	J. C. Goosie and Dave Ragan	Luti Fontanini
1956	Jack Jones	Luti Fontanini
1955	Gene Webb	Art Koch
1954	Gene Webb	Jack Webb
1953	Johnny Jacobs	Bud McCardell
1952	Jerry Barber	Merle Stimson
1951	Jerry Barber	Johnny Jacobs
1950	Wally Ulrich	Tom Crabbe
1949	Earl Wilde	Art Koch
1948	Leonard Dodson	Loddie Kempa
1947	Jack Hall	Warren Riepen
1946	Don Wilcox	Babe Veum
1945	Charles Burkhart	Ev Scheppele and Dixie Smith
1944	Chuck Johnson	Dick Graham
1943	Bob Reed	Merle Stimson
1942	Joe Brown and Don Wilcox	Merle Stimson and Joe Gardner
1941	Joe Brown	Ed Updefraff
1940	Vic Bass	Sid Richardson
1939	Don Wilcox	Dixie Smith
1938	Bob Hartenberger and Pat Wilcox	Gus Moreland
1937	Charles Burkhart and Art Steingraber	Gus Moreland
1936	Johnny Revolta	Fred Haas
1935	Vic Bass	Dick Graham
1934	Vic Bass and Howard Martin	Dick Graham
