= Straight Down Fall Classic =

Professional golf tournament in California

The Straight Down Fall Classic is a professional golf team tournament. It is played at San Luis Golf and Country Club near San Luis Obispo, California shortly after the PGA Tour's final tournament of the season. It pairs a professional with an amateur who play as a team over two days. The format is 36 holes pro-am, four-ball stroke play at scratch. The pro on the winning team will win $20,000. Second place will earn $11,000 and third place will receive $10,000. The low club pro will receive $3,000 and the amateur on the winning team will earn $750 in merchandise. The main sponsor, Straight Down, is a golf and athletic clothing company which also sponsors PGA Tour golfers. The event began in 1997.

Past participants in the tournament include Fred Couples, John Daly, Bryson DeChambeau, Brandt Snedeker, Tom Lehman and Tom Weiskopf. The 2019 Fall Classic will be played Nov. 16-17. The field includes PGA Tour winners Arron Oberholser, Paul Stankowski, Jason Gore, Loren Roberts and Steve Pate. Amateur participants include the Chicago Cubs' Ian Happ and Buddy Marucci, the runner-up to Tiger Woods in the 1995 U.S. Amateur.

== Pro Winners ==
Year	Team	Score	Prize
2018	Scott Heyn and Corby Segal	126	$20,000
2017	Jason Ballard and Michael Rowley	132	$20,000
2016	Bryce Molder and Jim Strickland	129	$20,000
2015	Scott Heyn and Corby Segal	131	$20,000
2014	Doug Garwood and Joe Bendetti	128	$20,000
2013	Jason Gore and Kevin Marsh	126	$22,500
2012	Scott Heyn and Corby Segal	130p	$22,500
2011	Brendan Steele and Greg Wells	130p	$25,000
2010	Loren Roberts and Michael Rowley	128	$25,000
2009	Jeff Brehaut and Todd Barsotti	130	$25,000
2008	Jason Gore and Kevin Marsh, Tim Fleming and Alan Bratton	127t	$25,000
2007	Roger Tambellini and Michael Rowley	130	$25,000
2006	Edward Loar and Don Woodward	131p	$20,000
2005	Charley Hoffman and Ed Cuff Jr.	130	$20,000
2004	Tom Pernice Jr. and Ed Cuff Jr.	128p	$20,000
2003	Edward Loar and John Pate	127	$20,000
2002	Roger Tambellini and Michael Rowley	127	$20,000
2001	Paul Stankowski and Brad Payne	126p	$20,000
2000	Larry Mize and Jim Lehman	128	$20,000
1999	Roger Tambellini and Michael Rowley	132	$15,000
1998	Scott Cartwright and Dave Thomas	129	$15,000
1997	Dennis Paulson and Ed Cuff Jr.	132	$5,000

p — Won a sudden death playoff.
t — Sudden death playoff called for darkness after four holes.

== Club Pro Winners ==
This list is incomplete.

Year	Team	Score	Prize
2018	Tom Gardner and Stewart Hagestad	133	$2,500
2017	Tim Fleming and Alan Bratton	133	$2,500
2016	Scott Heyn and Corby Segal	134	$2,500
2015	Scott Heyn and Corby Segal	131	$2,500
2014	David von Hoffmann and Riley Pumphrey	133	$2,500
2013	Mark Madson and Brent Brockmeyer	131	$2,500
2012	Scott Heyn and Corby Segal	130	$2,500
2011	Ned Weaver and Doug Hanzel	130	$2,500
2010	Bill Stine and Bo Hoag	130	$2,500
2009	Tim Fleming and Alan Bratton	132	$2,500
2008	Tim Fleming and Alan Bratton	128	$2,500
2007	Tim Fleming and Alan Bratton	136	$2,500
2006	Michael Henderson and Steve Nicholls	131	$2,500
2005	Mark Sherman and Jeff Wilson	131	$2,500
2004	Mark Sherman and Jeff Wilson	128	$2,500
2003	Brad Martin and Randy Haag	133	$2,500
