= Dennis Paulson =

American professional golfer (born 1962)

Personal information
- Full name: Dennis Jay Paulson
- Nationality: United States
- Born: September 27, 1962 (age 64) San Gabriel, California, U.S.
- Height: 6 ft 0 in (1.83 m)
- Weight: 200 lb (91 kg; 14 st)

Career
- Sport: Golf
- College: San Diego State University
- Turned professional: 1988
- Former tour: PGA Tour
- Professional wins: 8
- Highest ranking: 26 (June 11, 2000)

Number of wins by tour
- PGA Tour: 1
- Korn Ferry Tour: 1
- Other: 6

Best results in major championships
- Masters Tournament: T14: 2000
- PGA Championship: T58: 2000
- U.S. Open: CUT: 2001, 2004
- The Open Championship: T11: 2000

Dennis Jay Paulson (born September 27, 1962) is an American professional golfer.

== Biography ==
Paulson was born in San Gabriel, California. He had a PGA Tour victory in 2000. His tour nickname is The Chief.

Paulson has been featured in the top 50 of the Official World Golf Rankings.

After Paulson's playing career slowed, he became a radio commentator on the PGA Tour's Sirius XM station.

== Professional wins (8) ==
=== PGA Tour wins (1) ===
No.	Date	Tournament	Winning score	Margin of victory	Runner-up
1	Jun 11, 2000	Buick Classic	−8 (65-68-75-68=276)	Playoff	(United States) David Duval

PGA Tour playoff record (1–2)

No.	Year	Tournament	Opponent(s)	Result
1	1999	Buick Classic	(United States) Duffy Waldorf	Lost to birdie on first extra hole
2	2000	Buick Classic	(United States) David Duval	Won with par on fourth extra hole
3	2001	Nissan Open	(Australia) Robert Allenby, (United States) Brandel Chamblee, (Japan) Toshimitsu Izawa, (United States) Jeff Sluman, (United States) Bob Tway	Allenby won with birdie on first extra hole

=== Asia Golf Circuit wins (1) ===
No.	Date	Tournament	Winning score	Margin of victory	Runner-up
1	Feb 17, 1991	Philippine Open	−7 (71-68-71-71=281)	Playoff	(Taiwan) Chen Tze-chung

Asia Golf Circuit playoff record (1–0)

No.	Year	Tournament	Opponent	Result
1	1991	Philippine Open	(Taiwan) Chen Tze-chung	Won after concession on first extra hole

=== Nike Tour wins (1) ===
No.	Date	Tournament	Winning score	Margin of victory	Runner-up
1	Apr 26, 1998	Nike Huntsville Open	−9 (68-68-72-71=279)	Playoff	(United States) Brent Schwarzrock

Nike Tour playoff record (1–0)

No.	Year	Tournament	Opponent	Result
1	1998	Nike Huntsville Open	(United States) Brent Schwarzrock	Won with par on first extra hole

=== Other wins (6) ===
- 1990 California State Open
- 1991 Philippine Open
- 1993 Utah Open
- 1996 California State Open, Long Beach Open
- 1997 Straight Down Fall Classic (with Ed Cuff Jr.)

== Results in major championships ==
Tournament	1999	2000	2001	2002	2003	2004
Masters Tournament		T14	CUT			
U.S. Open		WD	CUT			CUT
The Open Championship	T58	T11	CUT			
PGA Championship	CUT	T58	CUT			

Did not play

CUT = missed the half-way cut
WD = Withdrew
"T" = tied

== Results in The Players Championship ==
Tournament	1995	1996	1997	1998	1999	2000	2001	2002	2003	2004	2005
The Players Championship	CUT					CUT	T31	CUT			CUT

Did not play

CUT = missed the halfway cut
"T" indicates a tie for a place

== Results in World Golf Championships ==
Tournament	1999	2000	2001
Match Play		R64	R64
Championship	T20	T45	NT^{1}
Invitational			

^{1}Cancelled due to 9/11

Did not play

QF, R16, R32, R64 = Round in which player lost in match play
"T" = Tied
NT = No tournament

== See also ==
- 1993 PGA Tour Qualifying School graduates
- 1998 Nike Tour graduates
