= 1968 PGA Tour =

Golf tour season

1968 PGA Tour season
- Duration: January 11, 1968 – November 24, 1968
- Number of official events: 46
- Most wins: (United States) Billy Casper (6)
- Money list: (United States) Billy Casper

The 1968 PGA Tour was the 53rd season of the PGA Tour, the main professional golf tour in the United States.

== Schedule ==
The following table lists official events during the 1968 season.

Date	Tournament	Location	Purse (US$)	Winner(s) (Note: The number in parentheses after each winner's name is the number of PGA Tour events they had won up to and including that tournament. This information is only shown for PGA Tour members.)	Notes
Jan 14	Bing Crosby National Pro-Am	California	80,000	(United States) Johnny Pott (5)	Pro-Am
Jan 21	Kaiser International Open Invitational	California	125,000	(United States) Kermit Zarley (1)	New tournament
Jan 28	Los Angeles Open	California	100,000	(United States) Billy Casper (35)	
Feb 4	Bob Hope Desert Classic	California	100,000	(United States) Arnold Palmer (53)	Pro-Am
Feb 11	Andy Williams-San Diego Open Invitational	California	150,000	(United States) Tom Weiskopf (1)	
Feb 18	Phoenix Open Invitational	Arizona	100,000	(Canada) George Knudson (5)	
Feb 25	Tucson Open Invitational	Arizona	100,000	(Canada) George Knudson (6)	
Mar 10	Doral Open Invitational	Florida	100,000	(United States) Gardner Dickinson (5)	
Mar 17	Florida Citrus Open Invitational	Florida	115,000	(United States) Dan Sikes (5)	
Mar 25	Pensacola Open Invitational	Florida	80,000	(United States) George Archer (3)	
Mar 31	Jacksonville Open Invitational	Florida	100,000	(England) Tony Jacklin (1)	
Apr 8	Greater Greensboro Open	North Carolina	137,500	(United States) Billy Casper (36)	
Apr 14	Masters Tournament	Georgia	100,000	(United States) Bob Goalby (8)	Major championship
Apr 14	Rebel Yell Open	Tennessee	14,000	(United States) Larry Mowry (n/a)	New tournament Second Tour (Note: Official money; unofficial win.)
Apr 21	Tournament of Champions	Nevada	150,000	(United States) Don January (7)	Winners-only event
Apr 21	Azalea Open Invitational	North Carolina	25,000	(United States) Steve Reid (1)	Alternate event
Apr 28	Byron Nelson Golf Classic	Texas	100,000	(United States) Miller Barber (3)	
May 5	Houston Champions International	Texas	100,000	(Argentina) Roberto De Vicenzo (7)	
May 12	Greater New Orleans Open Invitational	Louisiana	100,000	(United States) George Archer (4)	
May 19	Colonial National Invitation	Texas	125,000	(United States) Billy Casper (37)	Invitational
May 19	Magnolia Classic	Mississippi	14,000	(United States) Mac McLendon (n/a)	New tournament Second Tour
May 26	Memphis Open Invitational	Tennessee	100,000	(United States) Bob Lunn (1)	
Jun 2	Atlanta Classic	Georgia	115,000	(United States) Bob Lunn (2)	
Jun 9	500 Festival Open Invitation	Indiana	100,000	(United States) Billy Casper (38)	
Jun 16	U.S. Open	New York	190,000	(United States) Lee Trevino (1)	Major championship
Jun 23	Canadian Open	Canada	125,000	(New Zealand) Bob Charles (5)	
Jun 30	Cleveland Open Invitational	Ohio	110,000	(United States) Dave Stockton (2)	
Jul 7	Buick Open Invitational	Michigan	125,000	(United States) Tom Weiskopf (2)	
Jul 13	The Open Championship	Scotland	£20,000	(South Africa) Gary Player (11)	Major championship (Note: Unofficial money event at the time, but retrospectively counted as an official win.)
Jul 14	Greater Milwaukee Open	Wisconsin	200,000	(United States) Dave Stockton (3)	New tournament Alternate event
Jul 21	PGA Championship	Texas	150,000	(United States) Julius Boros (17)	Major championship
Jul 28	Minnesota Golf Classic	Minnesota	100,000	(United States) Dan Sikes (6)	
Aug 4	Western Open	Illinois	130,000	(United States) Jack Nicklaus (26)	
Aug 11	American Golf Classic	Ohio	125,000	(United States) Jack Nicklaus (27)	
Aug 18	Westchester Classic	New York	250,000	(United States) Julius Boros (18)	
Aug 25	Philadelphia Golf Classic	Pennsylvania	100,000	(United States) Bob Murphy (1)	
Sep 2	Thunderbird Classic	New Jersey	150,000	(United States) Bob Murphy (2)	
Sep 8	Greater Hartford Open Invitational	Connecticut	100,000	(United States) Billy Casper (39)	
Sep 15	Kemper Open	Massachusetts	150,000	(United States) Arnold Palmer (54)	New tournament
Sep 22	PGA National Team Championship	Oklahoma	100,000	(United States) George Archer (5) and (United States) Bobby Nichols (8)	New to PGA Tour; Team event
Sep 29	Robinson Open	Illinois	25,000	(United States) Dean Refram (1)	New tournament
Oct 20	Sahara Invitational	Nevada	100,000	(United States) Chi-Chi Rodríguez (5)	
Oct 27	Haig Open Invitational	California	110,000	(United States) Bob Dickson (1)	New tournament
Nov 3	Lucky International Open	California	100,000	(United States) Billy Casper (40)	
Nov 10	Hawaiian Open	Hawaii	125,000	(United States) Lee Trevino (2)	
Nov 24	Cajun Classic Open Invitational	Louisiana	35,000	(United States) Ron Cerrudo (1)	

=== Unofficial events ===
The following events were sanctioned by the PGA Tour, but did not carry official money, nor were wins official.

Date	Tournament	Location	Purse ($)	Winner(s)	Notes
Nov 17	World Cup	Italy	6,300	(Canada) Al Balding and (Canada) George Knudson	Team event
Nov 17	World Cup Individual Trophy	Italy	6,300	(Canada) Al Balding	

== Money list ==
The money list was based on prize money won during the season, calculated in U.S. dollars.

Position	Player	Prize money ($)
1	(United States) Billy Casper	205,168
2	(United States) Jack Nicklaus	155,285
3	(United States) Tom Weiskopf	152,945
4	(United States) George Archer	150,972
5	(United States) Julius Boros	148,310
6	(United States) Lee Trevino	132,127
7	(United States) Arnold Palmer	114,602
8	(United States) Dan Sikes	108,330
9	(United States) Miller Barber	105,845
10	(United States) Bob Murphy	105,595

== Awards ==
Award	Winner	Ref.
Scoring leader (Vardon Trophy)	(United States) Billy Casper	
