= Troy Matteson =

American professional golfer

Personal information
- Full name: Troy Jason Matteson
- Nationality: United States
- Born: November 8, 1979 (age 46) Rockledge, Florida, U.S.
- Height: 6 ft 0 in (1.83 m)
- Weight: 185 lb (84 kg; 13.2 st)
- Spouse: Shauna
- Children: 1

Career
- Sport: Golf
- College: Georgia Tech
- Turned professional: 2003
- Current tours: PGA Tour (past champion status)
- Former tour: Web.com Tour
- Professional wins: 4
- Highest ranking: 73 (February 4, 2007)

Number of wins by tour
- PGA Tour: 2
- Korn Ferry Tour: 2

Best results in major championships
- Masters Tournament: CUT: 2007
- PGA Championship: T28: 2010
- U.S. Open: DNP
- The Open Championship: T39: 2012

Achievements and awards
- Nationwide Tour money list winner: 2005

Troy Jason Matteson (born November 8, 1979) is an American professional golfer. He plays on the PGA Tour.

== Early life and amateur career ==
Matteson was born in Rockledge, Florida. He played college golf at Georgia Tech and won the NCAA Individual Championship in 2002.

== Professional career ==
=== Nationwide Tour ===
In 2004, Matteson joined the Nationwide Tour. He set the record for the most money won in one season on the Nationwide Tour during the 2005 season, picking up $495,009 while recording victories at the Virginia Beach Open and the Mark Christopher Charity Classic. This earned him a promotion to the PGA Tour for 2006. His record was eclipsed in 2009 by Michael Sim.

=== PGA Tour ===
Matteson picked up his first win on the PGA Tour at the Frys.com Open on October 15, 2006. He struggled during most of 2006 but finished in the top-10 in his last five events en route to a career best 36th-place finish on the money list.

Matteson continued to be consistent in 2007 and 2008, finishing 73rd and 89th on the money list respectively. He finished in a tie for second at the 2008 PODS Championship.

In 2009 at the Frys.com Open (not the same Frys.com Open that Matteson won in 2006) in Scottsdale, Arizona, Matteson set a 36-hole PGA Tour scoring record. Matteson shot 61-61 on Friday and Saturday for a total of 122 strokes. This feat beat the record of 123 set earlier in the season by Steve Stricker at the Bob Hope Classic. He went on to win the tournament in a three-man playoff over Rickie Fowler and Jamie Lovemark. He went on to finish 56th on the money list.

In 2010, Matteson finished 128th on the money list, which would normally mean a conditional Tour card and a trip to qualifying school. However, his win in 2009 earned him a two-year exemption until the end of 2011. Matteson almost picked up his third PGA Tour victory in March 2011 at the Puerto Rico Open but lost to Michael Bradley in a playoff. He would go on to finish 94th on the money list.

In July 2012, Matteson finished second at the John Deere Classic after losing out in a playoff to Zach Johnson. The pair were tied at 20 under par after regulation play and at the first extra hole both players made double bogey after finding the water hazard with their second shots into the 18th. Johnson won the playoff with a birdie on the second extra hole when he tapped in from less than a foot after a superb approach, while Matteson could not hole his 43-footer to extend the playoff. However Matteson secure a place in The Open Championship for the first time in his career by finishing as the highest non-qualifier at the event.

In 2013, he made only 10 cuts in 24 events. He played in the Web.com Tour Finals and finished 17th to retain his PGA Tour card for 2014.

Matteson tends to hit a long and high push-draw. His swing fits the model known as stack and tilt and he is coached by its creators, Mike Bennett and Andy Plummer. He performs a clear spine tilt to the left on back swing and places his body weight favoring the left foot throughout the whole swing.

== Professional wins (4) ==
=== PGA Tour wins (2) ===
No.	Date	Tournament	Winning score	Margin of victory	Runners-up
1	Oct 15, 2006	Frys.com Open	−22 (67-65-64-69=265)	1 stroke	(Sweden) Daniel Chopra, (United States) Ben Crane
2	Oct 25, 2009	Frys.com Open	−18 (72-61-61-68=262)	Playoff	(United States) Rickie Fowler, (United States) Jamie Lovemark

PGA Tour playoff record (1–2)

No.	Year	Tournament	Opponent(s)	Result
1	2009	Frys.com Open	(United States) Rickie Fowler, (United States) Jamie Lovemark	Won with birdie on second extra hole
2	2011	Puerto Rico Open	(United States) Michael Bradley	Lost to par on first extra hole
3	2012	John Deere Classic	(United States) Zach Johnson	Lost to birdie on second extra hole

=== Nationwide Tour wins (2) ===
No.	Date	Tournament	Winning score	Margin of victory	Runners-up
1	Apr 24, 2005	Virginia Beach Open	−13 (69-65-73-68=275)	2 strokes	(United States) Chris Couch
2	Sep 18, 2005	Mark Christopher Charity Classic	−13 (67-70-67-67=271)	2 strokes	(Australia) Mathew Goggin, (United States) Spike McRoy, (United States) Johnson Wagner

== Results in major championships ==
Tournament	2007	2008	2009	2010	2011	2012
Masters Tournament	CUT					
U.S. Open						
The Open Championship						T39
PGA Championship	T66			T28		

Did not play

CUT = missed the half-way cut
"T" = tied

== Results in The Players Championship ==
Tournament	2007	2008	2009	2010	2011	2012	2013
The Players Championship	CUT	T73	CUT	T17	CUT	CUT	CUT

CUT = missed the halfway cut
"T" indicates a tie for a place

== Results in World Golf Championships ==
Tournament	2007	2008	2009	2010
Match Play				
Championship				
Invitational	T51			T44

Did not play

"T" = Tied

== See also ==
- 2005 Nationwide Tour graduates
- 2013 Web.com Tour Finals graduates
