= 1928 U.S. Open (golf) =

Coordinates: 41.521°N 87.687°W

Tournament information
- Dates: June 21–24, 1928
- Location: Olympia Fields, Illinois
- Course(s): Olympia Fields Country Club; Course No. 4
- Organized by: USGA
- Format: Stroke play − 72 holes

Statistics
- Par: 71
- Length: 6,726 yards (6,150 m)
- Field: 144 players, 65 after cut
- Cut: 158 (+16)
- Prize fund: $2,000
- Winner's share: $500

Champion
- (United States) Johnny Farrell
- 294 (+10), playoff

Location in the United States
Location in Illinois

The 1928 U.S. Open was the 32nd U.S. Open, held June 21–24 at Course No. 4 of Olympia Fields Country Club in Olympia Fields, Illinois, a suburb south of Chicago. Johnny Farrell defeated noted amateur Bobby Jones in a 36-hole playoff to win his only major title. For Jones, a two-time champion in 1923 and 1926, it was his second playoff loss at the U.S. Open in four years and his fourth finish as a runner-up. He won the next two in 1929 and 1930.

Jones jumped out to the 36-hole lead with rounds of 73-71, two shots ahead of George Von Elm and Bill Leach. After a 73 in the third round, Jones took a two-stroke lead over Leach and Henry Ciuci into the final round. Five strokes behind Jones was Farrell, who had recorded rounds of 77-74-71. Farrell teed off well before Jones and shot 72 and a 294 total. With Jones still on the course with the lead, Farrell did not believe he had a chance of winning. In his final round, Jones was uncharacteristically erratic on holes six through ten, at seven-over-par for those five holes. He regrouped on the last eight holes and carded a 77 (+6) for 294 (+10). Gene Sarazen informed Farrell in the clubhouse that he and Jones were tied. Roland Hancock, age 21, would have won the championship by two strokes had he parred the final two holes, but he double-bogeyed 17 and bogeyed 18 to fall a shot out of the playoff.

This was the first year that the USGA implemented a 36-hole playoff. On the first 18, Farrell shot a 70 to Jones' 73. Beginning the second 18, however, Jones quickly got back to all square after two holes. Jones double-bogeyed the 4th to give Farrell a two-stroke lead once again, but three consecutive bogeys beginning at the 10th knocked Farrell out of the lead. Now trailing by one with six holes to play, Farrell nearly aced the par-3 13th, recording a birdie to tie up the match. At the 16th, Jones missed a short putt to give Farrell the lead. At 17, Farrell hit a superb approach to 3 feet (0.9 m), while Jones was 20 feet (6 m) away. Jones made his birdie putt to put pressure on Farrell, who responded by holing out. At the par-5 18th, both Jones and Farrell recorded birdies, clinching a one-stroke victory for Farrell in the rain.

The next playoff at the U.S. Open was the following year, won by Jones by 23 strokes. The playoff in 1931 was tied after 36 holes, resulting in a second 36-hole playoff, which caused the USGA to return to the 18-hole format. The next playoff in 1939 was reduced back to 18 holes, but the top two competitors were tied and it went another 18 holes. Sudden-death following the round was not introduced until the 1950s, and not needed until 1990; it was used again in 1994 and 2008.

The four 18-hole courses at Olympia Fields were reduced to two in the late 1940s when the club sold half of its property. Course No. 4 became the North course, and the South course is a composite of holes from the other three.

== Course layout ==
Course No. 4

Hole	1	2	3	4	5	6	7	8	9	Out	10	11	12	13	14	15	16	17	18	In	Total
Yards	530	455	420	368	353	163	415	220	458	3,382	433	387	380	130	433	555	153	383	490	3,344	6,726
Par	5	4	4	4	4	3	4	3	4	35	4	4	4	3	4	5	3	4	5	36	71

== Round summaries ==
=== First round ===
Thursday, June 21, 1928

Place	Player	Score	To par
T1	(England) Frank Ball	70	−1
T1	(United States) Henry Ciuci	70	−1
3	(United States) Leonard Schmutte	71	E
T4	(United States) Leo Diegel	72	+1
T4	(United States) Johnny Golden	72	+1
T4	(United States) Bill Leach	72	+1
T4	(United States) Horton Smith	72	+1
T8	(England) Jim Barnes	73	+2
T8	(United States) Bobby Jones (a)	73	+2
T8	(United States) Johnny Jones	73	+2
T8	(United States) Willie Hunter	73	+2
T8	(Scotland) Willie Macfarlane	73	+2
T8	(Scotland) Fred McLeod	73	+2
T8	(United States) Fred Morrison	73	+2

=== Second round ===
Friday, June 22, 1928

Place	Player	Score	To par
1	(United States) Bobby Jones (a)	73-71=144	+2
T2	(United States) Bill Leach	72-74=146	+4
T2	(United States) George Von Elm (a)	74-72=146	+4
T4	(United States) Henry Ciuci	70-77=147	+5
T4	(United States) Walter Hagen	75-72=147	+5
T4	(Scotland) Willie Macfarlane	73-74=147	+5
T7	(United States) Waldo Crowder	74-74=148	+6
T7	(United States) Al Espinosa	74-74=148	+6
T7	(United States) Denny Shute	75-73=148	+6
T7	(United States) Frank Walsh	74-74=148	+6

=== Third round ===
Saturday, June 23, 1928 (morning)

Place	Player	Score	To par
1	(United States) Bobby Jones (a)	73-71-73=217	+4
T2	(United States) Henry Ciuci	70-77-72=219	+6
T2	(United States) Bill Leach	72-74-73=219	+6
T4	(United States) Walter Hagen	75-72-73=220	+7
T4	(Scotland) Willie Macfarlane	73-74-73=220	+7
T6	(United States) Johnny Farrell	77-74-71=222	+9
T6	(United States) George Von Elm (a)	74-72-76=222	+9
8	(United States) Roland Hancock	74-77-72=223	+10
T9	(United States) Waldo Crowder	74-74-76=224	+11
T9	(United States) Ed Dudley	77-79-68=224	+11

=== Final round ===
Saturday, June 23, 1928 (afternoon)

Place	Player	Score	To par	Money ($)
T1	(United States) Johnny Farrell	77-74-71-72=294	+10	Playoff
T1	(United States) Bobby Jones (a)	73-71-73-77=294	+10	Playoff
3	(United States) Roland Hancock	74-77-72-72=295	+11	300
T4	(United States) Walter Hagen	75-72-73-76=296	+12	200
T4	(United States) George Von Elm (a)	74-72-76-74=296	+12	0
T6	(United States) Henry Ciuci	70-77-72-80=299	+15	74
T6	(United States) Waldo Crowder	74-74-76-75=299	+15	74
T6	(United States) Ed Dudley	77-79-68-75=299	+15	74
T6	(United States) Bill Leach	72-74-73-80=299	+15	74
T6	(United States) Gene Sarazen	78-76-73-72=299	+15	74
T6	(United States) Denny Shute	75-73-79-72=299	+15	74
T6	(United States) Macdonald Smith	75-77-75-72=299	+15	74
T6	(United States) Joe Turnesa	74-77-74-74=299	+15	74

(a) denotes amateur

==== Scorecard ====
Final round

Hole	1	2	3	4	5	6	7	8	9	10	11	12	13	14	15	16	17	18
Par	5	4	4	4	4	3	4	3	4	4	4	4	3	4	5	3	4	5
(United States) Farrell	+9	+9	+9	+9	+10	+10	+10	+10	+10	+11	+10	+10	+10	+10	+11	+11	+11	+10
(United States) Jones	+4	+4	+4	+4	+3	+5	+7	+8	+9	+9	+10	+10	+10	+10	+9	+10	+10	+10

Cumulative tournament scores, relative to par

=== Playoff ===
Sunday, June 24, 1928 (36 holes)

Place	Player	Score	To par	Money ($)
1	(United States) Johnny Farrell	70-73=143	+1	500
2	(United States) Bobby Jones (a)	73-71=144	+2	0

==== Scorecards ====
Morning round

Hole	1	2	3	4	5	6	7	8	9	10	11	12	13	14	15	16	17	18
Par	5	4	4	4	4	3	4	3	4	4	4	4	3	4	5	3	4	5
(United States) Farrell	E	+1	+1	+1	+1	E	+1	+2	+2	+1	+2	+2	+2	+3	+2	+1	E	−1
(United States) Jones	−1	E	+2	+2	+2	+2	+2	+2	+3	+3	+3	+3	+3	+3	+2	+2	+2	+2

Afternoon round

Hole	1	2	3	4	5	6	7	8	9	10	11	12	13	14	15	16	17	18
Par	5	4	4	4	4	3	4	3	4	4	4	4	3	4	5	3	4	5
(United States) Farrell	E	+1	+1	E	E	E	+1	+1	+1	+2	+3	+4	+3	+3	+3	+3	+2	+1
(United States) Jones	+1	+1	+3	+2	+1	+1	+1	+1	+3	+3	+3	+3	+3	+3	+3	+4	+3	+2

Cumulative playoff scores, relative to par

Eagle	Birdie	Bogey	Double bogey	Triple bogey+
