= Derek Lamely =

American professional golfer (born 1980)

Personal information
- Nationality: United States
- Born: July 12, 1980 (age 46) Belleville, Illinois, U.S.
- Height: 5 ft 11 in (1.80 m)
- Weight: 170 lb (77 kg; 12 st)

Career
- Sport: Golf
- College: Florida Gulf Coast University; McNeese State University
- Turned professional: 2004
- Current tours: PGA Tour (past champion status); Korn Ferry Tour
- Professional wins: 5
- Highest ranking: 85 (March 28, 2010)

Number of wins by tour
- PGA Tour: 1
- Korn Ferry Tour: 1
- Other: 3

Best results in major championships
- Masters Tournament: DNP
- PGA Championship: CUT: 2010
- U.S. Open: CUT: 2010
- The Open Championship: DNP

Derek Lamely (born July 12, 1980) is an American professional golfer who has played on the PGA Tour and the Nationwide Tour.

== Early life and amateur career ==
Lamely was born in Belleville, Illinois. He was a member of the Texas State Championship team at Montgomery High School. He played college golf at McNeese State University before transferring to Florida Gulf Coast University.

== Professional career ==
In 2004, Lamely turned professional. He won the Iowa Open that year.

Lamely began his career on the mini tours. In 2008, he played on the Egolf Tarheel Tour. Lamely won the 2008 Waterloo Open Golf Classic which is the largest golf tournament in Iowa. Lamely went to PGA Tour qualifying school for the first time in 2008 but did not earn his card. Lamely joined the Nationwide Tour in 2009. He did not find much success until August when he won the Nationwide Children's Hospital Invitational in a playoff over Rickie Fowler. Lamely began the final round eight strokes behind the leader but his final round of 65 (−6) was enough to force a playoff. He finished 4th on the money list and earned his 2010 PGA Tour card.

In March 2010, he won his first PGA Tour event, the Puerto Rico Open by two strokes. The win earned Lamely $630,000 and a two-year exemption on the PGA Tour. Lamely was unable to repeat his success and did not have another top ten finish on the PGA Tour. He did not play in 2013 and missed the cut in the two events he played in 2014.

== Professional wins (4) ==
=== PGA Tour wins (1) ===
| No. | Date | Tournament | Winning score | Margin of victory | Runner-up |
|---|---|---|---|---|---|
| 1 | Mar 15, 2010 | Puerto Rico Open | −19 (69-71-63-66=269) | 2 strokes | (United States) Kris Blanks |

=== Nationwide Tour wins (1) ===
| No. | Date | Tournament | Winning score | Margin of victory | Runner-up |
|---|---|---|---|---|---|
| 1 | Aug 2, 2009 | Nationwide Children's Hospital Invitational | −11 (71-69-68-65=273) | Playoff | (United States) Rickie Fowler (a) |

Nationwide Tour playoff record (1–0)

| No. | Year | Tournament | Opponent | Result |
|---|---|---|---|---|
| 1 | 2009 | Nationwide Children's Hospital Invitational | (United States) Rickie Fowler (a) | Won with par on second extra hole |

=== Other wins (3) ===
- 2004 Iowa Open
- 2008 Waterloo Open Golf Classic, Greater Cedar Rapids Open Golf Classic

== Results in major championships ==
| Tournament | 2010 |
|---|---|
| U.S. Open | CUT |
| PGA Championship | CUT |

CUT = missed the half-way cut
Note: Lamely only played in the U.S. Open and the PGA Championship.

== See also ==
- 2009 Nationwide Tour graduates
