= Larry Beck =

American golfer (1939–2019)

Larry E. Beck Sr. (August 12, 1939 – June 3, 2019) was an American professional golfer from Kinston, North Carolina.

Beck was born in Randolph County, North Carolina. At age 17, Beck won the 1957 U.S. Junior Amateur, beating Jack Nicklaus 4 and 3 in the third round of match play. As a professional, he competed in the 1964 U.S. Open (tied for 39th) and the 1966 PGA Championship (tied for 72nd).

Beck was a PGA Life Member who developed and renovated golf facilities as well as instructing, and managing facilities as a pro in several locations in the Carolinas. "Heads Up Golf" instruction principles are his creation which gives students a good understanding of how position, balance and energy maximize their performance.

Beck was with Whispering Pines (Pinehurst, North Carolina) as teaching professional for 15 years where he created and conducted the first of its kind, Junior Golf Camp in the U.S. in 1966. He was head golf professional and instructor at a number of club operations. He received his education through golf scholarships at Wake Forest University and the University of Houston with a major in Elementary Education.

Beck died June 3, 2019, in Sanford, North Carolina.
