= Jack Rule Jr. =

American golfer (born 1938)

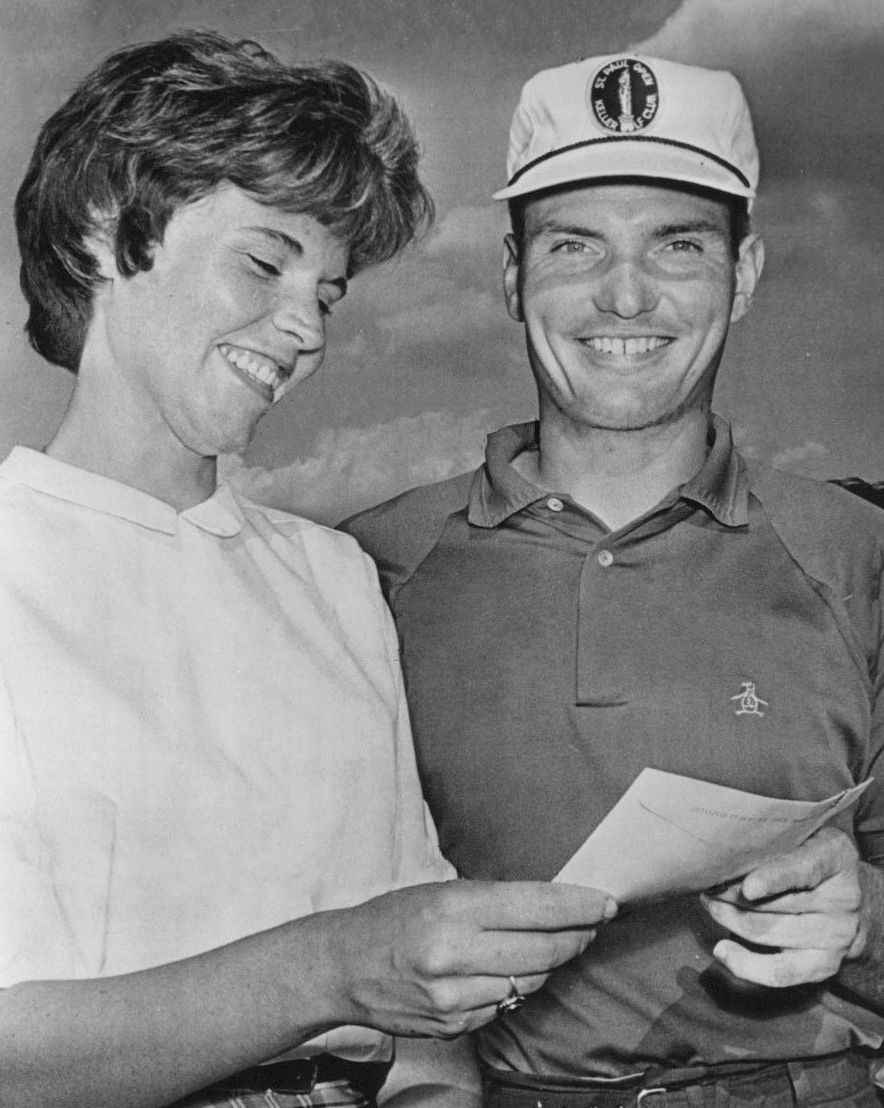
- Rule with wife Loretta after winning the 1963 St. Paul Open Invitational

Personal information
- Full name: Jack D. Rule Jr.
- Nationality: United States
- Born: November 13, 1938 (age 87) Mason City, Iowa, U.S.
- Height: 5 ft 10 in (1.78 m)
- Weight: 180 lb (82 kg; 13 st)

Career
- Sport: Golf
- College: University of Iowa
- Turned professional: 1961
- Former tour: PGA Tour
- Professional wins: 5

Number of wins by tour
- PGA Tour: 2

Best results in major championships
- Masters Tournament: CUT: 1964
- PGA Championship: T39: 1964
- U.S. Open: T54: 1974
- The Open Championship: DNP

Jack D. Rule Jr. (born November 13, 1938) is an American professional golfer who played on the PGA Tour in the 1960s.

== Early life and amateur career ==
Rule was born in Mason City, Iowa and grew up in Waterloo, Iowa. He defeated Jack Nicklaus in the 1956 U.S. Junior Amateur semi-finals but lost to Harlan Stevenson in the finals. He graduated from the University of Iowa.

== Professional career ==
In 1961, Rule turned professional. Rule won twice on the PGA Tour, the 1963 St. Paul Open Invitational and the 1965 Oklahoma City Open Invitational. His best finish in a major was T39 at the 1964 PGA Championship.

Rule played sparingly on the Champions Tour from 1989 to 2001, mostly in the U.S. Senior Open.

== Awards and honors ==
In 1993, Rule was inducted into the Iowa Golf Hall of Fame.

== Amateur wins ==
- 1956 National Jaycee Tournament
- 1958 Waterloo Open Amateur Tournament, Iowa Amateur, Western Junior
- 1959 Waterloo Open Amateur Tournament, Iowa Amateur

== Professional wins (5) ==
=== PGA Tour wins (2) ===
No.	Date	Tournament	Winning score	Margin of victory	Runner-up
1	Aug 4, 1963	St. Paul Open Invitational	−22 (67-61-65-73=266)	5 strokes	(United States) Fred Hawkins
2	Sep 5, 1965	Oklahoma City Open Invitational	−5 (72-71-70-70=283)	1 stroke	(United States) Bobby Nichols

=== Other wins (3) ===
- 1966 Haig & Haig Scotch Foursome (with Sandra Spuzich)
- 1969 Waterloo Open Golf Classic
- 1974 Waterloo Open Golf Classic
