= Los Angeles Country Club =

Country club in Los Angeles, California, United States

- Location in the United States Location in California Location in Los Angeles
- 34.069°N 118.423°W

Club information
- Location: 10101 Wilshire Boulevard; Los Angeles, California, United States
- Elevation: 370 feet (115 m)
- Established: 1897; 129 years ago 1911; 115 years ago (current)
- Type: Private
- Total holes: 36
- Tournaments: Los Angeles Open (1926, 1934–1936, 1940); Walker Cup (2017); U.S. Open (2023)
- Website: thelacc.org

North Course
- Par: 70
- Length: 7,200 yards (6,580 m)
- Course rating: 75.7
- Slope rating: 143

South Course
- Par: 70
- Course rating: 71.1
- Slope rating: 129

The Los Angeles Country Club is a golf and country club in Los Angeles, California, United States. The club is noted for being very exclusive. It hosted the 2023 U.S. Open on its North Course.

== History ==
In the fall of 1897, a group of Los Angeles residents organized the Los Angeles Golf Club. Subsequently, the club leased a 16-acre (6.5 ha) lot at the corner of Pico and Alvarado streets (now part of the Alvarado Terrace Historic District) to build a nine-hole golf course. Called "The Windmill Links," the course was named for a makeshift clubhouse crafted from the bottom of an abandoned windmill. Through the middle of 1898, this site served as the club's home until the course became too crowded.

The club was removed to Pico Heights, at Hobart and 16th streets, and was named "The Convent Links" for its location behind a convent near Rosedale Cemetery. Again, nine holes were laid out for play, but by the spring of 1899, this course and clubhouse had also become too restricted for play.

The search committee for a new site, consisting of the club founders Joe Sartori and Ed Tufts, found the club's new home just 0.2 miles (0.3 km) west, on the northeast corner of Pico and Western. The clubhouse was transported intact to a new site in Beverly Hills, and it was expanded there. The club also laid out an 18-hole course, reopened on May 30, 1911, expanded to 36 holes, and added tennis courts.

The original golf course was laid out by Sartori, Tufts, Norman Macbeth, and Charles Orr. The courses were redesigned by Herbert Fowler and George C. Thomas, Jr., and again by Thomas with William P. Bell in 1927–28.

The land used for the Los Angeles Country Club's first golf course had previously been used as a garbage dump. Shav Glick described the land by stating in his Los Angeles Times article, "The land had once been a garbage dump," and the first course was built using simple materials.

The North Course was completed in 1921 and officially opened to members on August 10, 1921 and was designed by W. Herbert Fowler. The Golf Historical Society's article about the opening states, “The North course still has 12-13 original holes laid out by Fowler that were reconstructed by William P. Bell to George C. Thomas Jr.’s redesign in 1928, when they also added five new holes”. Thomas had also served as Fowler's construction foreman for the club's two courses before taking on a larger role in redesigning the North Course himself. Thomas and Bell focused on creating more variety throughout the course, giving golfers different ways to approach each hole and reach the greens. His work with Bell helped create the challenging layout of the course as it stand now.

Over the years some of the original features of the North Course became less noticeable. Trees grew into playing corridors and blocked views across the property. The greens became smaller and lost some of their original hole locations, while the bunkers became more rounded out and less natural looking because of years of changes and maintenance. These changes affected the way the course looked and played compared with Thomas and Bell's original design.

Gil Hanse began working on the restoration of the North Course in 2006, with the major reconstruction taking place in 2009 and 2010. Klein states, “The major reconstruction work took place in 2009 and 2010. The scope of work involved "recapturing the original, expansive greens and the club’s craggy, scraggily bunker look and feel”. The Golf Historical Society reports that “The 2010 Gil Hanse restoration was to the 1928 Fowler-Thomas-Bell version of the North,” while rebuilding the earlier Fowler par three 17th hole as an extra hole.

The restoration involved more than just changing the course's appearance. The greens, bunkers, and tees were reconstructed completely, and the natural barrancas were restored. Trees were removed to reopen playing corridors and long views that had become blocked over time. Hanse and his team studied historical aerial photos, ground photos, and architectural drawings to understand how the course originally looked. They also worked to restore the relationship between the greens and the surrounding slopes, allowing the course to feel more like its original challenges built into the design. The project helped bring back the course's natural terrain and the different ways golfers could approach each hole. The team also restored original green sites for the second and eighth holes. They expanded the available hole locations and widened fairways to give golfers more options when playing holes. Additional teeing grounds were added, this was to help bring back the original challenges from the original design.

From 2019 to 2023, Los Angeles architecture, urban design & planning, and interiors firm, Johnson Fain, along with its consultant team, restored the LACC's 80,000 square foot clubhouse. The original landmark clubhouse, designed by Sumner Hunt and constructed in 1911, was renewed and expanded including the interiors, gardens, and golf pro shop in a multi-year project.

The club has been criticized for the extraordinarily low tax rate it pays – around $300,000 annually despite land valuations calculated between six and nine billion dollars, which would ordinarily draw a tax bill of $60 to $90 million annually. This is because of a series of specific measures passed in the 1970s that provided preferential treatment to golf courses, as well as its status as a federal non-profit.

== Hosts national and international championships ==
The club hosted the 1930 United States Women's Amateur Golf Championship; Glenna Collett Vare defeated Virginia Van Wie in the final match. The club hosted the 1954 U.S. Junior Amateur Golf Championship; Foster Bradley defeated Al Geiberger in the final match. The club hosted the 2017 Walker Cup, won by the United States.

In 1996 and 1997 an extensive renovation of the North and South courses was completed. In February 2010, an extensive restoration of the North Course by Gil Hanse and Thomas biographer Geoff Shackelford took place to return the course to George C. Thomas, Jr.'s design from 1921. The course reopened in October 2010.

== Hosts PGA Tour events ==
The North course hosted the first Los Angeles Open 100 years ago in 1926, and it returned four times: 1934, 1935, 1936, and 1940. The most recent in 1940, won by Lawson Little, was plagued by heavy rains.

== 2023 U.S. Open ==
On July 22, 2015, the United States Golf Association (USGA) announced that Los Angeles Country Club was selected to host the 123rd U.S. Open in June 2023. The first major championship held at the club, it was the first men's major in the Los Angeles area in 28 years, and the area's first U.S. Open in 75 years.

== Tournament history ==
- Los Angeles Open

Year	Player	Country	Score	To par	Margin of victory	Runner(s)-up	Winner's share ($)	Purse ($)
1940	Lawson Little	United States	282	+2	1 stroke	(United States) Clayton Heafner	1,500	5,000
1936	Jimmy Hines	United States	280	E	4 strokes	(United States) Henry Picard (Scotland) Jimmy Thomson	1,500	5,000
1935	Vic Ghezzi	United States	285	+5	Playoff	(United States) Johnny Revolta	1,175	5,000
1934	Macdonald Smith	Scotland	280	E	8 strokes	(Scotland) Willie Hunter (United States) Bill Mehlhorn	1,450	5,000
1926	Harry Cooper	United States	279	−7	3 strokes	(United States) George Von Elm	3,500	10,000

- The playoff in 1935 was 18 holes and was won by two strokes, 73 to 75, and both earned the same amount.
- U.S. Open

Year	Player	Country	Score	To par	Margin of victory	Runner-up	Winner's share ($)	Purse ($)
2023	Wyndham Clark	United States	270	−10	1 stroke	(Northern Ireland) Rory McIlroy	$3,600,000	$20,000,000

== Notable members ==
- J. Win Austin, Los Angeles City Council member, 1941–1953
- Robert L. Burns, Los Angeles City Council member, 1929–1945
- Arthur Letts, department store founder
- Ronald Reagan
