= Los Angeles Open =

Golf tournament held in Los Angeles, California, US

Coordinates: 34.05°N 118.50°W

Genesis Invitational

Tournament information
- Location: Pacific Palisades, California
- Established: 1926
- Course: Riviera Country Club
- Par: 72
- Length: 7,802
- Organized by: Tiger Woods Foundation
- Tour: PGA Tour
- Format: Stroke play
- Prize fund: US$20,000,000
- Month played: February
- Website: genesisinvitational.com

Tournament record score
- Aggregate: 264 Lanny Wadkins (1985)
- To par: −20 as above

Current champion
- (United States) Jacob Bridgeman

Final champion
- Location in the United States Location in California

The Genesis Invitational is a professional golf tournament on the PGA Tour in Southern California, first played 100 years ago in 1926 as the Los Angeles Open. Other previous names include Genesis Open, Northern Trust Open and Nissan Open. Played annually in February at the Riviera Country Club in Pacific Palisades, it is often the concluding event of the tour's "West Coast Swing" early in the calendar year, before the tour moves east to Florida.

The tournament has been held at Riviera on a near-continuous basis since 1973. South Korea-based Hyundai Motor Group, through its Genesis Motors subsidiary, took over sponsorship in 2017, after nine seasons from Northern Trust Corporation, based in Chicago, following a 21-year sponsorship by Nissan Motors. Entertainer Glen Campbell was the celebrity host of the Los Angeles Open from 1971 through 1983.

== Tournament sites ==
Listed by most recent

Times hosted	Venue	Location	Years
61	Riviera Country Club	Pacific; Palisades	1929–1930, 1941, 1945–1953, 1973–1982, 1984–1997, 1999–2024, 2026–
1	Torrey Pines Golf Course (South Course)	San Diego	2025
1	Valencia Country Club	Valencia	1998
17	Rancho Park Golf Course	Los Angeles	1956–1967, 1969–1972, 1983
1	Brookside Golf Course	Pasadena	1968
1	Inglewood Country Club	Inglewood	1955
1	Fox Hills Country Club	Culver City	1954
4	Wilshire Country Club	Los Angeles	1928, 1931, 1933, 1944
2	Hillcrest Country Club	Los Angeles	1932, 1942
5	Los Angeles Country Club	Los Angeles	1926, 1934–1936, 1940
3	Griffith Park (Wilson course)^	Los Angeles	1937–1939
1	El Caballero Country Club	Tarzana	1927

Not held in 1943
^ One round of the first two was played on the adjacent Harding course

== History ==
Locations in L.A. metro area since 1945

Prior to World War II, the event led a nomadic existence in Southern California, moving from course to course. The inaugural event 100 years ago in 1926 was played at Los Angeles Country Club in Los Angeles; in 1927 the event moved to El Caballero Country Club in Tarzana for the only time. In 1928, the event moved again to Wilshire Country Club in the Hancock Park neighborhood, and 1929 and 1930 saw the event's first foray to the Riviera Country Club in Pacific Palisades before returning again to Los Angeles for the next decade. From 1931 to 1933, the event alternated between Wilshire CC and Hillcrest Country Club, before returning to Los Angeles CC from 1934–1936. From 1937–1939, the event was played at Griffith Park (Wilson course) and again at Los Angeles CC in 1940. Babe Zaharias played in the 1938 event, being the first woman to play in a professional golf tournament for men.

In 1941, the event returned to Riviera CC and in 1942 was played again at Hillcrest CC before World War II intervened.

The event started up again in 1944 at Wilshire CC before spending the next nine years (1945–1953) at Riviera CC, which also hosted the U.S. Open in June 1948, won by Ben Hogan in a record score. In 1954, the event was played at Fox Hills Country Club (now in Culver City) and in 1955 moved to Inglewood Country Club. From 1956–1972, the event returned to Los Angeles at Rancho Park Golf Course, with the exception of 1968, which was at Brookside Golf Course in Pasadena, adjacent to the Rose Bowl. In early January 1962, 21-year-old Jack Nicklaus made his professional debut at the Los Angeles Open – his 289 tied for 50th (last place after the cut) at Rancho Park and earned $33.33 in prize money.

The L.A. Open was traditionally the first event of the season, played in early January; it was a late January event in 1967 and 1968, and moved to the latter half of February in 1974. The year before, it began its current relationship with Riviera CC. The tournament has only twice been played at other courses since: back at Rancho Park in 1983, while Riviera prepared to host the PGA Championship in August, and Valencia Country Club in 1998, while Riviera prepared to host the U.S. Senior Open in late July. The event remained at Riviera in 1995, despite hosting the PGA Championship that August, and also remained in 2017, when it hosted the U.S. Amateur in late August.

In 1992, Riviera was the site of Tiger Woods' first PGA Tour event as an amateur player, as a 16-year-old high school sophomore. Neither Woods nor Jack Nicklaus have won the event; Woods lost in a playoff in 1998 (at Valencia) and was again a runner-up the next year at Riviera, while Nicklaus' best finish was two strokes back in solo second in 1978. He had earned his first paycheck as a pro in the event in 1962 at Rancho Park, less than thirty four dollars.

The 2001 event was only the second time that a six-player playoff was needed in PGA Tour history to determine the tournament winner. Robert Allenby won the playoff ahead of Toshi Izawa, Brandel Chamblee, Bob Tway, Jeff Sluman, and Dennis Paulson.

In 2005, the tournament was shortened by 36 holes due to rain. Adam Scott defeated Chad Campbell on the first hole of a sudden-death playoff on a Monday. Due to the event's length, this win is counted as unofficial for Scott.

In 2007, Rich Beem made a hole-in-one at the 14th hole on Saturday to win a new red Altima coupe, which he immediately ascended, embraced, and sat atop of in triumph. The sequence was later made into a Nissan commercial. (video) Beem credited Peter Jacobsen for inspiring his reaction; Jacobsen aced the same hole thirteen years earlier in 1994 then hopped into the nearby 300ZX convertible and pretended to drive it.

In September 2007, it was originally announced that Bearing Point, a consulting firm based in McLean, Virginia, would become the new title sponsor of the tournament, but Northern Trust became the title sponsor beginning in February 2008. The five-year agreement, which extended through the 2012 event, was announced October 15, 2007, by PGA Tour Commissioner Tim Finchem and William A. Osborn, Chairman and CEO of Northern Trust Corporation. The tournament became known as the Northern Trust Open, and the new partnership marks the beginning of a process of transformation for this high-profile tournament. As part of the initial move to enhance the tournament, the Northern Trust Open increased its purse to $6.2 million in 2008, an increase of $1 million over 2007. Additionally, the tournament pro-am went from four amateurs to three per group. After the initial 5-year agreement, it was extended 4 years to cover Northern Trust's partnership through the 2016 event.

Phil Mickelson won the 2008 tournament and successfully defended the title in 2009 with a one-stroke victory over Steve Stricker. In 2010, Stricker came back to win the Northern Trust Open and secure his ranking of the number two player in the world. In 2016, Bubba Watson won the tournament for a second time in three years, holding off Adam Scott and Jason Kokrak to win by one shot with a 15-under-par total.

Following the demise of The National tournament after 2018, which was run by the Tiger Woods Foundation, the Genesis Open was converted to an invitational for 2020, with a larger purse and a smaller field.

Due to the January 2025 Southern California wildfires, the 2025 edition was moved from Riviera to Torrey Pines Golf Course in San Diego. Torrey Pines hosted the Farmers Insurance Open three weeks earlier, with one round on the North course (either Thursday or Friday) and three on the South; all four rounds of the Genesis Invitational were on the South course.

== Invitational status ==
The Genesis Invitational is one of only five tournaments given "invitational" status by the PGA Tour, and consequently it has a reduced field of only 69 players in 2024 (as opposed to most full-field open tournaments with a field of 156 players). The other four are the Arnold Palmer Invitational, RBC Heritage, Charles Schwab Challenge, and the Memorial Tournament.

Invitational tournaments have smaller fields (between 69 and 132 players), and have more freedom than full-field open tournaments in determining which players are eligible to participate in their event, as invitational tournaments are not required to fill their fields using the PGA Tour Priority Ranking System. Furthermore, unlike full-field open tournaments, invitational tournaments do not offer open qualifying (aka Monday qualifying). The winner is granted a three-year tour exemption, rather than two.

== Field ==
The field consists of at least 120 players invited using the following criteria:

1. Genesis winners from past five years
2. The Players Championship and major championship winners in the last five years
3. FedEx Cup winners in the last five years (beginning with the 2019 winner)
4. World Golf Championships winners in the past three years
5. Arnold Palmer Invitational and Memorial Tournament winners in the past three years
6. Tournament winner since last Genesis
7. Prior year U.S. Amateur winner (may have turned professional)
8. Current PGA Tour members who were playing members of last named Ryder Cup and Presidents Cup teams
9. Top 125 from prior year FedEx Cup points list
10. Top 10 from the current FedEx Cup points list (as of Friday prior)
11. 12 sponsor exemptions – 2 from Web.com Tour finals, 2 members not otherwise exempt, and 8 unrestricted
12. If necessary, field filled to 120 from current year FedEx Cup point list (as of Friday prior)

=== Charlie Sifford Memorial Exemption ===
In 2009, the tournament designated one unrestricted exemption for a player who represents the advancement of diversity in golf. The exemption is called the Charlie Sifford Memorial Exemption, in honor of pioneering black golfer and 1969 tournament winner Charlie Sifford. While most of the recipients have been of African-American descent, the 2015 exemption went to PGA Tour rookie Carlos Sainz Jr., of Filipino and Bolivian descent; and the 2016 recipient, J. J. Spaun, is also of Filipino descent.

The 2018 exemption went to Cameron Champ, who nine months later became the first past recipient of this exemption to win on the PGA Tour when he won the Sanderson Farms Championship in the fall portion of the 2019 season. In 2020, Joseph Bramlett became the first two-time recipient of the award.

Year	Player	Result
2009	Vincent Johnson	CUT
2010	Joshua Wooding	CUT
2011	Joseph Bramlett	CUT
2012	Andy Walker	CUT
2013	Jeremiah Wooding	T42
2014	Harold Varner III	T70
2015	Carlos Sainz Jr.	CUT
2016	J. J. Spaun	CUT
2017	Kevin Hall	CUT
2018	Cameron Champ	CUT
2019	Timothy O'Neal	CUT
2020	Joseph Bramlett (2)	T51
2021	Willie Mack III	CUT
2022	Aaron Beverly	CUT

== Course layout ==
Hole	1	2	3	4	5	6	7	8	9	Out	10	11	12	13	14	15	16	17	18	In	Total
Yards	503	471	434	236	434	199	408	433	458	3,576	315	583	479	459	192	487	166	590	475	3,746	7,322
Par	5	4	4	3	4	3	4	4	4	35	4	5	4	4	3	4	3	5	4	36	71

== Winners ==
Year	Winner	Score	To par	Margin of victory	Runner(s)-up	Purse ($)	Winner's share ($)	Ref.
Genesis Invitational
2026	(United States) Jacob Bridgeman	266	−18	1 stroke	(United States) Kurt Kitayama (Northern Ireland) Rory McIlroy	20,000,000	4,000,000	
2025	(Sweden) Ludvig Åberg	276	−12	1 stroke	(United States) Maverick McNealy	20,000,000	4,000,000	
2024	(Japan) Hideki Matsuyama	267	−17	3 strokes	(United States) Luke List (United States) Will Zalatoris	20,000,000	4,000,000	
2023	(Spain) Jon Rahm	267	−17	2 strokes	(United States) Max Homa	20,000,000	3,600,000	
2022	(Chile) Joaquín Niemann	265	−19	2 strokes	(United States) Collin Morikawa (United States) Cameron Young	12,000,000	2,160,000	
2021	(United States) Max Homa	272	−12	Playoff	(United States) Tony Finau	9,300,000	1,674,000	
2020	(Australia) Adam Scott (2)	273	−11	2 strokes	(United States) Scott Brown (South Korea) Kang Sung-hoon (United States) Matt Kuchar	9,300,000	1,674,000	
Genesis Open
2019	(United States) J. B. Holmes	270	−14	1 stroke	(United States) Justin Thomas	7,400,000	1,332,000	
2018	(United States) Bubba Watson (3)	272	−12	2 strokes	(United States) Kevin Na (United States) Tony Finau	7,200,000	1,296,000	
2017	(United States) Dustin Johnson	267	−17	5 strokes	(United States) Scott Brown (Belgium) Thomas Pieters	7,000,000	1,260,000	
Northern Trust Open
2016	(United States) Bubba Watson (2)	269	−15	1 stroke	(United States) Jason Kokrak (Australia) Adam Scott	6,800,000	1,224,000	
2015	(United States) James Hahn	278	−6	Playoff	(England) Paul Casey (United States) Dustin Johnson	6,700,000	1,206,000	
2014	(United States) Bubba Watson	269	−15	2 strokes	(United States) Dustin Johnson	6,700,000	1,206,000	
2013	(United States) John Merrick	273	−11	Playoff	(United States) Charlie Beljan	6,600,000	1,188,000	
2012	(United States) Bill Haas	277	−7	Playoff	(United States) Keegan Bradley (United States) Phil Mickelson	6,600,000	1,188,000	
2011	(Australia) Aaron Baddeley	272	−12	2 strokes	(Fiji) Vijay Singh	6,500,000	1,170,000	
2010	(United States) Steve Stricker	268	−16	2 strokes	(England) Luke Donald	6,400,000	1,152,000	
2009	(United States) Phil Mickelson (2)	269	−15	1 stroke	(United States) Steve Stricker	6,300,000	1,134,000	
2008	(United States) Phil Mickelson	272	−12	2 strokes	(United States) Jeff Quinney	6,200,000	1,116,000	
Nissan Open
2007	(United States) Charles Howell III	268	−16	Playoff	(United States) Phil Mickelson	5,200,000	936,000	
2006	(South Africa) Rory Sabbatini	271	−13	1 stroke	(Australia) Adam Scott	5,100,000	918,000	
2005	(Australia) Adam Scott	133 (Note: Shortened to 36 holes due to rain. Due to the event's length, this win is not officially recognized as a PGA Tour victory.)	−9	Playoff	(United States) Chad Campbell	4,800,000	864,000	
2004	(Canada) Mike Weir (2)	267	−17	1 stroke	(Japan) Shigeki Maruyama	4,800,000	864,000	
2003	(Canada) Mike Weir	275	−9	Playoff	(United States) Charles Howell III	4,500,000	810,000	
2002	(United States) Len Mattiace	269	−15	1 stroke	(United States) Brad Faxon (United States) Scott McCarron (South Africa) Rory Sabbatini	3,700,000	666,000	
2001	(Australia) Robert Allenby	276	−8	Playoff	(United States) Brandel Chamblee (Japan) Toshimitsu Izawa (United States) Dennis Paulson (United States) Jeff Sluman (United States) Bob Tway	3,400,000	612,000	
2000	(United States) Kirk Triplett	272	−12	1 stroke	(Sweden) Jesper Parnevik	3,100,000	558,000	
1999	(South Africa) Ernie Els	270	−14	2 strokes	(United States) Davis Love III (United States) Ted Tryba (United States) Tiger Woods	2,800,000	504,000	
1998	(United States) Billy Mayfair	272	−12	Playoff	(United States) Tiger Woods	2,100,000	378,000	
1997	(England) Nick Faldo	272	−12	3 strokes	(United States) Craig Stadler	1,400,000	252,000	
1996	(United States) Craig Stadler	278	−6	1 stroke	(United States) Mark Brooks (United States) Fred Couples (United States) Scott Simpson (United States) Mark Wiebe	1,200,000	216,000	
1995	(United States) Corey Pavin (2)	268	−16	3 strokes	(United States) Jay Don Blake (United States) Kenny Perry	1,200,000	216,000	
Nissan Los Angeles Open
1994	(United States) Corey Pavin	271	−13	2 strokes	(United States) Fred Couples	1,000,000	180,000	
1993	(United States) Tom Kite	206 (Note: Shortened to 54 holes due to rain.)	−7	3 strokes	(Canada) Dave Barr (United States) Fred Couples (United States) Donnie Hammond (United States) Payne Stewart	1,000,000	180,000	
1992	(United States) Fred Couples (2)	269	−15	Playoff	(United States) Davis Love III	1,000,000	180,000	
1991	(United States) Ted Schulz	272	−12	1 stroke	(United States) Jeff Sluman	1,000,000	180,000	
1990	(United States) Fred Couples	266	−18	3 strokes	(United States) Gil Morgan	1,000,000	180,000	
1989	(United States) Mark Calcavecchia	272	−12	1 stroke	(Scotland) Sandy Lyle	1,000,000	180,000	
Los Angeles Open
1988	(United States) Chip Beck	267	−17	4 strokes	(United States) Mac O'Grady (United States) Bill Sander	750,000	135,000	
1987	(Taiwan) Chen Tze-chung	275	−9	Playoff	(United States) Ben Crenshaw	600,000	108,000	
1986	(United States) Doug Tewell	270	−14	7 strokes	(United States) Clarence Rose	450,000	81,000	
1985	(United States) Lanny Wadkins (2)	264	−20	7 strokes	(United States) Hal Sutton	400,000	72,000	
1984	(United States) David Edwards	279	−5	3 strokes	(United States) Jack Renner	400,000	72,000	
Glen Campbell-Los Angeles Open
1983	(United States) Gil Morgan (2)	270	−14	2 strokes	(United States) Gibby Gilbert (United States) Mark McCumber (United States) Lanny Wadkins	300,000	54,000	
1982	(United States) Tom Watson (2)	271	−13	Playoff	(United States) Johnny Miller	300,000	54,000	
1981	(United States) Johnny Miller	270	−14	2 strokes	(United States) Tom Weiskopf	300,000	54,000	
1980	(United States) Tom Watson	276	−8	1 stroke	(United States) Bob Gilder (United States) Don January	250,000	45,000	
1979	(United States) Lanny Wadkins	276	−8	1 stroke	(United States) Lon Hinkle	250,000	45,000	
1978	(United States) Gil Morgan	278	−6	2 strokes	(United States) Jack Nicklaus	225,000	40,000	
1977	(United States) Tom Purtzer	273	−11	1 stroke	(United States) Lanny Wadkins	225,000	40,000	
1976	(United States) Hale Irwin	272	−12	2 strokes	(United States) Tom Watson	185,000	37,000	
1975	(United States) Pat Fitzsimons	275	−9	4 strokes	(United States) Tom Kite	150,000	30,000	
1974	(United States) Dave Stockton	276	−8	2 strokes	(United States) John Mahaffey (United States) Sam Snead	150,000	30,000	
1973	(United States) Rod Funseth	276	−8	3 strokes	(United States) Don Bies (Australia) David Graham (United States) Dave Hill (United States) Tom Weiskopf	135,000	27,000	
1972	(United States) George Archer	270	−14	Playoff	(United States) Tommy Aaron (United States) Dave Hill	125,000	25,000	
1971	(United States) Bob Lunn	274	−10	Playoff	(United States) Billy Casper	110,000	22,000	
Los Angeles Open
1970	(United States) Billy Casper (2)	276	−8	Playoff	(United States) Hale Irwin	100,000	20,000	
1969	(United States) Charlie Sifford	276	−8	Playoff	(South Africa) Harold Henning	100,000	20,000	
1968	(United States) Billy Casper	274	−10	3 strokes	(United States) Arnold Palmer	100,000	20,000	
1967	(United States) Arnold Palmer (3)	269	−15	5 strokes	(United States) Gay Brewer	100,000	20,000	
1966	(United States) Arnold Palmer (2)	273	−11	3 strokes	(United States) Miller Barber (United States) Paul Harney	70,000	11,000	
1965	(United States) Paul Harney (2)	276	−8	3 strokes	(United States) Dan Sikes	70,000	12,000	
1964	(United States) Paul Harney	280	−4	1 stroke	(United States) Bobby Nichols	50,000	7,500	
1963	(United States) Arnold Palmer	274	−10	3 strokes	(Canada) Al Balding (South Africa) Gary Player	50,000	9,000	
1962	(United States) Phil Rodgers	268	−16	9 strokes	(United States) Bob Goalby (United States) Fred Hawkins	45,000	7,500	
1961	(United States) Bob Goalby	275	−9	3 strokes	(Scotland) Eric Brown (United States) Art Wall Jr.	45,000	7,500	
1960	(United States) Dow Finsterwald	280	−4	3 strokes	(United States) Bill Collins (United States) Jay Hebert (United States) Dave Ragan	37,500	5,500	
1959	(United States) Ken Venturi	278	−6	2 strokes	(United States) Art Wall Jr.	35,000	5,300	
1958	(United States) Frank Stranahan	275	−9	3 strokes	(United States) Dutch Harrison	35,000	7,000	
1957	(United States) Doug Ford	280	−4	1 stroke	(United States) Jay Hebert	37,500	7,000	
1956	(United States) Lloyd Mangrum (4)	272	−12	3 strokes	(United States) Jerry Barber	32,500	6,000	
1955	(United States) Gene Littler	276	−8	2 strokes	(United States) Ted Kroll	25,000	5,000	
1954	(United States) Fred Wampler	281	−3	1 stroke	(United States) Jerry Barber (United States) Chick Harbert	20,000	4,000	
1953	(United States) Lloyd Mangrum (3)	280	−4	5 strokes	(United States) Jack Burke Jr.	20,000	2,750	
1952	(United States) Tommy Bolt	289	+5	Playoff	(United States) Jack Burke Jr. (United States) Dutch Harrison	17,500	4,000	
1951	(United States) Lloyd Mangrum (2)	280	−4	1 stroke	(United States) Henry Ransom	15,000	2,600	
1950	(United States) Sam Snead (2)	280	−4	Playoff	(United States) Ben Hogan	15,000	2,600	
1949	(United States) Lloyd Mangrum	284	E	3 strokes	(United States) Dutch Harrison	15,000	2,600	
1948	(United States) Ben Hogan (3)	275	−9	4 strokes	(United States) Lloyd Mangrum	10,000	2,000	
1947	(United States) Ben Hogan (2)	280	−4	3 strokes	(United States) Toney Penna	10,000	2,000	
1946	(United States) Byron Nelson	284	E	5 strokes	(United States) Ben Hogan	13,333	2,667	
1945	(United States) Sam Snead	283	−1	1 stroke	(United States) Jug McSpaden (United States) Byron Nelson	13,333	2,666	
1944	(United States) Jug McSpaden	278	−6	3 strokes	(United States) Johnny Bulla	12,500	4,300	
1943: No tournament due to World War II
1942	(United States) Ben Hogan	282	−6	Playoff	(Scotland) Jimmy Thomson	10,000	3,500	
1941	(United States) Johnny Bulla	281	−3	2 strokes	(United States) Craig Wood	10,000	3,500	
1940	(United States) Lawson Little	282	+2	1 stroke	(United States) Clayton Heafner	5,000	1,500	
1939	(United States) Jimmy Demaret	274	−10	7 strokes	(United States) Jug McSpaden	5,000	1,650	
1938	(Scotland) Jimmy Thomson	273	−11	4 strokes	(United States) Johnny Revolta	5,000	2,100	
1937	(United States) Harry Cooper (2)	274	−10	5 strokes	(United States) Ralph Guldahl (United States) Horton Smith	8,000	2,500	
1936	(United States) Jimmy Hines	280	E	4 strokes	(United States) Henry Picard (Scotland) Jimmy Thomson	5,000	1,500	
1935	(United States) Vic Ghezzi	285	+5	Playoff	(United States) Johnny Revolta	5,000	1,075	
1934	(Scotland) Macdonald Smith (4)	280	E	8 strokes	(Scotland) Wille Hunter (United States) Bill Mehlhorn	5,000	1,450	
1933	(United States) Craig Wood	282	−2	4 strokes	(United States) Leo Diegel (Scotland) Willie Hunter	5,000	1,525	
1932	(Scotland) Macdonald Smith (3)	281	−3	4 strokes	(United States) Leo Diegel (United States) Olin Dutra (Australia) Joe Kirkwood Sr. (United States) Dick Metz	7,500	2,000	
1931	(United States) Ed Dudley	285	+1	2 strokes	(United States) Al Espinosa (United States) Eddie Loos	10,000	3,500	
1930	(United States) Denny Shute	296	+12	4 strokes	(Scotland) Bobby Cruickshank (United States) Horton Smith	10,000	3,500	
1929	(Scotland) Macdonald Smith (2)	285	+1	6 strokes	(United States) Tommy Armour	10,000	3,500	
1928	(Scotland) Macdonald Smith	284	E	3 strokes	(United States) Harry Cooper	10,000	3,500	
1927	(Scotland) Bobby Cruickshank	282	−6	6 strokes	(United States) Ed Dudley (United States) Charles Guest	10,000	3,500	
1926	(United States) Harry Cooper	279	−9	3 strokes	(United States) George Von Elm	10,000	3,500	

Note: Green highlight indicates scoring records.
