= 1983 PGA Championship =

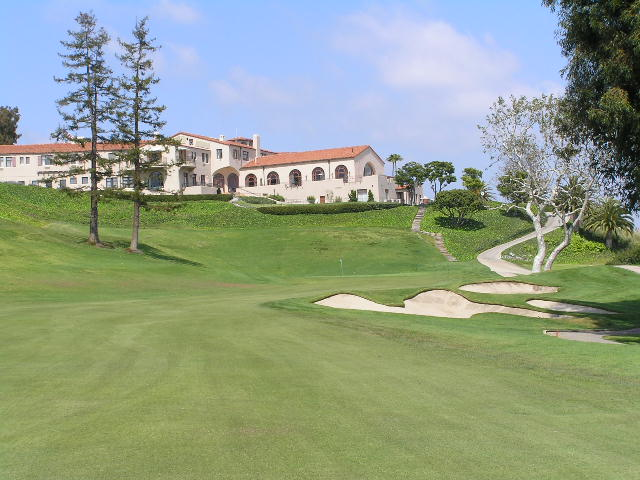
- Finishing hole at Riviera Country Club

Tournament information
- Dates: August 4–7, 1983
- Location: Los Angeles, California; 34.05°N 118.501°W
- Course: Riviera Country Club
- Organized by: PGA of America
- Tour: PGA Tour

Statistics
- Par: 71
- Length: 6,946 yards (6,351 m)
- Field: 150 players, 87 after cut
- Cut: 147 (+5)
- Prize fund: $600,000
- Winner's share: $100,000

Champion
- (United States) Hal Sutton
- 274 (−10)
- Location in the United States Location in California

The 1983 PGA Championship was the 65th PGA Championship, held August 4–7 at Riviera Country Club in Los Angeles, California. Hal Sutton led wire-to-wire to win his only major title, one stroke ahead of runner-up Jack Nicklaus, a five-time champion. Nicklaus shot a final round 66 (−5) for his 19th and final runner-up finish in a major championship. Sutton was under scrutiny as he entered the weekend; two weeks earlier in Virginia, he had a six-shot lead after 54 holes, shot a final round 77, and finished third.

It was the second major at Riviera, following the U.S. Open in 1948, won by Ben Hogan. The PGA Championship returned to the course in 1995, and it hosts a regular event on the PGA Tour, originally known as the Los Angeles Open.

Only the third PGA Championship in California, it was preceded by 1929 in Los Angeles at Hillcrest and 1977 at Pebble Beach. The 1962 event was originally awarded to Brentwood in L.A., but was moved to Philadelphia at Aronimink.

This was the first major championship to award a six-figure winner's share, $100,000, increasing from the $65,000 of the previous year. The first five-figure winner's share in a major was the 1958 Masters and the 2001 Masters was the first to break seven figures.

== Round summaries ==
=== First round ===
Thursday, August 4, 1983

Place	Player	Score	To par
1	(United States) Hal Sutton	65	−6
T2	(United States) Scott Simpson	66	−5
T2	(United States) Buddy Whitten	66	−5
T4	(United States) Danny Edwards	67	−4
T4	(United States) John Fought	67	−4
T4	(United States) Bruce Lietzke	67	−4
T7	(United States) Ben Crenshaw	68	−3
T7	(United States) Keith Fergus	68	−3
T7	(United States) Jay Haas	68	−3
T7	(United States) Pat McGowan	68	−3
T7	(United States) Jim Thorpe	68	−3

=== Second round ===
Friday, August 5, 1983

Place	Player	Score	To par
1	(United States) Hal Sutton	65-66=131	−11
2	(United States) Ben Crenshaw	68-66=134	−8
3	(United States) Pat McGowan	68-67=135	−7
T4	(United States) John Fought	67-69=136	−6
T4	(United States) Gibby Gilbert	70-66=136	−6
T4	(United States) Buddy Whitten	66-70=136	−6
T7	(United States) Keith Fergus	68-70=138	−4
T7	(United States) Bruce Lietzke	67-71=138	−4
T7	(United States) Jack Nicklaus	73-65=138	−4
T7	(United States) Lee Trevino	70-68=138	−4

=== Third round ===
Saturday, August 6, 1983

Place	Player	Score	To par
1	(United States) Hal Sutton	65-66-72=203	−10
2	(United States) Ben Crenshaw	68-66-71=205	−8
3	(United States) John Fought	67-69-71=207	−6
T4	(United States) Bruce Lietzke	67-71-70=208	−5
T4	(United States) Pat McGowan	68-67-73=208	−5
T4	(United States) Larry Nelson	68-67-73=208	−5
T7	(United States) Jay Haas	68-72-69=209	−4
T7	(United States) Jack Nicklaus	73-65-71=209	−4
T7	(United States) Scott Simpson	66-73-70=209	−4
T7	(United States) Buddy Whitten	66-70-73=209	−4

=== Final round ===
Sunday, August 7, 1983

==== Final leaderboard ====
Champion
(c) = past champion

Top 10
Place	Player	Score	To par	Money (US$)
1	(United States) Hal Sutton	65-66-72-71=274	−10	100,000
2	(United States) Jack Nicklaus (c)	73-65-71-66=275	−9	60,000
3	(United States) Peter Jacobsen	73-70-68-65=276	−8	40,000
4	(United States) Pat McGowan	68-67-73-69=277	−7	30,000
5	(United States) John Fought	67-69-71-71=278	−6	25,000
T6	(United States) Bruce Lietzke	67-71-70-71=279	−5	19,000
T6	(United States) Fuzzy Zoeller	72-71-67-69=279	−5	19,000
8	(United States) Dan Pohl	72-70-69-69=280	−4	16,000
T9	(United States) Ben Crenshaw	68-66-71-77=282	−2	10,880
T9	(United States) Jay Haas	68-72-69-73=282	−2	10,880
T9	(United States) Mike Reid	69-71-72-70=282	−2	10,880
T9	(United States) Scott Simpson	66-73-70-73=282	−2	10,880
T9	(United States) Doug Tewell	74-72-69-67=282	−2	10,880

Leaderboard below the top 10
Place	Player	Score	To par	Money ($)
T14	(United States) Keith Fergus	68-70-72-73=283	−1	6,750
T14	(Australia) David Graham (c)	70-69-74-70=283	−1	6,750
T14	(United States) Hale Irwin	72-70-73-68=283	−1	6,750
T14	(United States) Roger Maltbie	71-71-71-70=283	−1	6,750
T14	(United States) Jim Thorpe	68-72-74-69=283	−1	6,750
T14	(United States) Lee Trevino (c)	70-68-74-71=283	−1	6,750
T20	(United States) John Cook	74-71-68-71=284	E	4,750
T20	(United States) Danny Edwards	67-76-71-70=284	E	4,750
T20	(United States) Raymond Floyd (c)	69-75-71-69=284	E	4,750
T23	(United States) Chip Beck	72-71-70-72=285	+1	3,913
T23	(United States) Fred Couples	71-70-73-71=285	+1	3,913
T23	(United States) Jerry Pate	69-72-70-74=285	+1	3,913
T23	(United States) Don Pooley	72-68-74-71=285	+1	3,913
T27	(Spain) Seve Ballesteros	71-76-72-67=286	+2	3,200
T27	(United States) Bobby Wadkins	73-72-74-67=286	+2	3,200
T27	(United States) Buddy Whitten	66-70-73-77=286	+2	3,200
T30	(United States) Andy Bean	71-73-71-72=287	+3	2,650
T30	(United States) Bob Boyd	70-77-72-68=287	+3	2,650
T30	(United States) Johnny Miller	72-75-73-67=287	+3	2,650
T30	(United States) Mark Pfeil	73-71-70-73=287	+3	2,650
T30	(United States) Jim Simons	69-75-72-71=287	+3	2,650
T30	(United States) Tom Weiskopf	76-70-69-72=287	+3	2,650
T36	(United States) Jim Colbert	73-66-76-73=288	+4	2,088
T36	(United States) Larry Nelson (c)	72-68-68-80=288	+4	2,088
T36	(United States) Bobby Nichols (c)	75-69-74-70=288	+4	2,088
T36	(United States) Calvin Peete	69-71-76-72=288	+4	2,088
T36	(United States) Bob Shearer	73-67-76-72=288	+4	2,088
T36	(United States) Tim Simpson	76-70-70-72=288	+4	2,088
T42	(United States) Lou Graham	73-74-70-72=289	+5	1,875
T42	(United States) Gary Hallberg	71-75-71-72=289	+5	1,875
T42	(United States) Barry Jaeckel	73-74-67-75=289	+5	1,875
T42	(Australia) Greg Norman	72-72-70-75=289	+5	1,875
T42	(South Africa) Gary Player (c)	74-68-73-74=289	+5	1,875
T47	(United States) Gibby Gilbert	70-66-80-74=290	+6	1,730
T47	(United States) Morris Hatalsky	69-75-73-73=290	+6	1,730
T47	(United States) Vance Heafner	73-74-72-71=290	+6	1,730
T47	(United States) Lon Hinkle	70-75-74-71=290	+6	1,730
T47	(United States) Larry Mize	70-70-75-75=290	+6	1,730
T47	(United States) Mike Nicolette	72-71-73-74=290	+6	1,730
T47	(England) Peter Oosterhuis	75-71-71-73=290	+6	1,730
T47	(United States) Tom Watson	75-67-78-70=290	+6	1,730
T55	(United States) John Adams	75-71-72-73=291	+7	1,610
T55	(United States) George Burns	78-68-72-73=291	+7	1,610
T55	(United States) Charles Coody	73-72-70-76=291	+7	1,610
T55	(United States) Ed Fiori	75-69-73-74=291	+7	1,610
T55	(United States) Gil Morgan	72-73-74-72=291	+7	1,610
T55	(United States) Jack Renner	74-71-73-73=291	+7	1,610
T61	(United States) Scott Hoch	73-72-74-73=292	+8	1,565
T61	(Canada) Jim Nelford	72-72-76-72=292	+8	1,565
T63	(United States) Bruce Fleisher	74-73-74-72=293	+9	1,535
T63	(United States) Bob Gilder	71-69-76-77=293	+9	1,535
T63	(United States) Mark Lye	75-67-75-76=293	+9	1,535
T63	(United States) Craig Stadler	72-73-76-72=293	+9	1,535
T67	(United States) George Archer	70-77-74-73=294	+10	1,506
T67	(United States) Mike Donald	71-71-76-76=294	+10	1,506
T67	(United States) Tom Kite	72-75-73-74=294	+10	1,506
T67	(United States) Arnold Palmer	74-73-74-73=294	+10	1,506
T67	(Zimbabwe) Nick Price	72-74-74-74=294	+10	1,506
72	(Taiwan) Chen Tze-chung	72-75-79-69=295	+11	1,500
73	(United States) Larry Gilbert	71-74-76-75=296	+12	1,500
T74	(United States) Rex Caldwell	74-73-75-75=297	+13	1,500
T74	(United States) Pat Lindsey	74-72-80-71=297	+13	1,500
76	(United States) Ron Streck	72-73-77-76=298	+14	1,500
T77	(United States) Bill Britton	74-73-77-78=300	+16	1,500
T77	(United States) Bobby Heins	73-74-75-78=300	+16	1,500
T77	(United States) Jim Logue	73-74-77-76=300	+16	1,500
T80	(United States) Lee Elder	76-71-77-77=301	+17	1,500
T80	(United States) Ed Sneed	74-73-75-79=301	+17	1,500
T82	(United States) Bob Eastwood	76-70-77-79=302	+18	1,500
T82	(United States) Allen Miller	69-78-77-78=302	+18	1,500
T84	(United States) Robert Hoyt	71-72-80-80=303	+19	1,500
T84	(United States) Leonard Thompson	73-74-75-81=303	+19	1,500
86	(United States) Curtis Strange	71-74-85-74=304	+20	1,500
87	(United States) Jim King	73-73-78-84=308	+24	1,500
CUT	(United States) Hubert Green	73-75=148	+6	
CUT	(United States) Mark Hayes	72-76=148	+6	
CUT	(United States) Bob Lendzion	74-74=148	+6	
CUT	(United States) Mark O'Meara	72-76=148	+6	
CUT	(United States) Jim Albus	74-75=149	+7	
CUT	(United States) Gene Borek	71-78=149	+7	
CUT	(United States) Brad Bryant	72-77=149	+7	
CUT	(United States) Billy Casper	74-75=149	+7	
CUT	(United States) Al Geiberger (c)	74-75=149	+7	
CUT	(United States) John Jackson	72-77=149	+7	
CUT	(United States) John Mahaffey (c)	77-72=149	+7	
CUT	(United States) Jim Masserio	76-73=149	+7	
CUT	(United States) Mark McCumber	79-70=149	+7	
CUT	(United States) Andy North	75-74=149	+7	
CUT	(United States) Pete Oakley	72-77=149	+7	
CUT	(United States) Don Padgett	73-76=149	+7	
CUT	(United States) Tom Purtzer	74-75=149	+7	
CUT	(United States) Payne Stewart	78-71=149	+7	
CUT	(United States) Paul Wise	77-72=149	+7	
CUT	(United States) Mike Wynn	73-76=149	+7	
CUT	(United States) Bruce Ashworth	72-78=150	+8	
CUT	(United States) David Edwards	72-78=150	+8	
CUT	(Canada) Dan Halldorson	73-77=150	+8	
CUT	(United States) Gary Koch	72-78=150	+8	
CUT	(United States) Mike McCullough	72-78=150	+8	
CUT	(Japan) Tsuneyuki Nakajima	76-74=150	+8	
CUT	(United States) Tim Norris	74-76=150	+8	
CUT	(Mexico) Victor Regalado	71-79=150	+8	
CUT	(United States) Lanny Wadkins (c)	70-80=150	+8	
CUT	(United States) D. A. Weibring	73-77=150	+8	
CUT	(United States) Ed Whitman	76-74=150	+8	
CUT	(Japan) Isao Aoki	75-76=151	+9	
CUT	(United States) Dave Barber	76-75=151	+9	
CUT	(England) Nick Faldo	74-77=151	+9	
CUT	(United States) Kevin Morris	75-76=151	+9	
CUT	(United States) Tom Robertson	74-77=151	+9	
CUT	(United States) Jack Seltzer	77-74=151	+9	
CUT	(United States) Mike Sullivan	76-75=151	+9	
CUT	(United States) Tim Collins	76-76=152	+10	
CUT	(United States) Bob Elliott	78-74=152	+10	
CUT	(United States) John Elliott Jr.	77-75=152	+10	
CUT	(United States) Rick Karbowski	78-74=152	+10	
CUT	(United States) Vic Lipscomb	78-74=152	+10	
CUT	(United States) Gary McCord	72-80=152	+10	
CUT	(United States) Jack Sommers	75-77=152	+10	
CUT	(United States) Dave Stockton (c)	78-74=152	+10	
CUT	(United States) Rick Werner	78-74=152	+10	
CUT	(United States) Jim White	80-72=152	+10	
CUT	(United States) Steve Benson	79-74=153	+11	
CUT	(United States) Bobby Clampett	76-77=153	+11	
CUT	(United States) Gene Littler	75-78=153	+11	
CUT	(United States) Bill Rogers	81-72=153	+11	
CUT	(United States) J. C. Snead	77-77=154	+12	
CUT	(United States) John Gentile	79-76=155	+13	
CUT	(United States) Don Maddox	79-76=155	+13	
CUT	(United States) Clarence Rose	75-80=155	+13	
CUT	(United States) Phillip Hancock	73-83=156	+14	
CUT	(United States) Thomas Gray	78-79=157	+15	
CUT	(United States) Robbie Gilmore	81-79=160	+18	
CUT	(United States) Jerry Barber (c)	80-83=163	+21	
CUT	(United States) Denis Husse	81-83=164	+22	
CUT	(United States) Jack McConachie	82-84=166	+24	
CUT	(United States) John Kirchner	87-83=170	+28	
