= William P. Bell =

American golf course architect (1886–1953)

- Born: April 19, 1886; Canonsburg, Pennsylvania, U.S.
- Died: June 21, 1953 (aged 67); Pasadena, California, U.S.
- Resting place: Mountain View Cemetery; Altadena, California, U.S.
- Occupation: Golf course architect
- Title: ASGCA President
- Board member of: American Society of Golf Course Architects
- Spouse(s): Anna K. Bell (1893–1975)
- Children: William Francis Bell (1918–1984)

William Park Bell (April 19, 1886 – June 21, 1953) was a noted golf course architect, active from the 1920s into the early 1950s.

== Biography ==
Born in Canonsburg, Pennsylvania, Billy Bell studied agriculture at Duff's Business Institute in Pittsburgh. He moved west to California at age 25 in 1911, and held a series of golf jobs at the Pasadena Country Club, including caddymaster and course superintendent. Bell worked on golf course construction for architect Willie Watson, including serving as Watson's superintendent, before going into golf course design and development on his own in 1920.

Most of Bell's courses were designed and built in Southern California. He is considered one of the most important golf course architects in the state, with more than fifty courses credited to his work and design, and he designed and built courses in other western states as well, including Nevada, Arizona, Utah, Oregon, and Hawaii.

Early in his design career, Bell worked closely with famous designer and fellow Pennsylvanian George C. Thomas Jr., on courses which included the Riviera Country Club, often cited as one of the world's best courses. Although Thomas is listed as architect of record, Bell made significant contributions to many of the designs. Bell's son William F. Bell (1918–1984) trained with him, joined him in partnership after World War II, and later became an important golf course architect in his own right. Bell Sr. served as a turf consultant to the U.S. Army Corps of Engineers during the war, and was awarded a commendation by the Southern California chapter of the PGA, in honor of his work creating golf courses for wounded servicemen. Bell Sr. was a founding member of the American Society of Golf Course Architects, and served as ASGCA President in 1952.

Bell died in Pasadena at age 67 in 1953 and is buried at Mountain View Cemetery and Mausoleum in Altadena.

== Courses ==
Golf courses designed and built by William P. Bell:

Name	Year built	City / Town	State / Province	Country	Comments
Adobe Course at Arizona Biltmore Hotel		Phoenix	Arizona	United States	Resort
Encanto Park GC		Phoenix	Arizona	United States	Public course
Mesa CC		Mesa	Arizona	United States	Private course
Tucson CC		Tucson	California	United States	Private course; with William Francis Bell
Bakersfield CC		Bakersfield	California	United States	Private course
Balboa Park Municipal GC		San Diego	California	United States	Public course
Bel-Air CC		Bel Air	California	United States	Private course
Brookside GC		Pasadena	California	United States	Public course; 36 holes
Chevy Chase CC		Glendale	California	United States	Private course; with William Francis Bell
David L Baker GC		Fountain Valley	California	United States	Public course
Girard CC		Woodland Hills	California	United States	Private course; now Woodland Hills CC;
Hacienda GC		La Habra Heights	California	United States	Private course
La Jolla CC		La Jolla	California	United States	Private course
Marine Memorial Golf Course		Camp Pendleton	California	United States	Military course that allows Public play
Meadowlark GC		Huntington Beach	California	United States	Public course
Mesa Verde CC		Costa Mesa	California	United States	Private course
North Ridge CC		Fair Oaks	California	United States	Private course
Rancho Park GC		Los Angeles	California	United States	Public course
Red Hill CC		Alta Loma	California	United States	Private course; with George C. Thomas Jr.
San Diego CC		Chula Vista	California	United States	Private course
Stanford University GC		Palo Alto	California	United States	Private course; with George C. Thomas Jr.
Sunnyside CC		Fresno	California	United States	Private course
Torrey Pines GC (North course, South course)		San Diego	California	United States	Municipal courses; 36 holes
Tilden Park GC		Berkeley	California	United States	Public course
Virginia CC		Long Beach	California	United States	Private course; with A.W. Tillinghast
Woodland Hills CC		Woodland Hills	Private course	United States	
Valley CC		Englewood	Private course	United States	Colorado
Kaneohe Klipper GC		Kaneohe	Hawaii	United States	Military course
The Legacy GC		Henderson	Nevada	United States	
Forest Hills GC		Cornelius	Oregon	Public course; with William Francis Bell	
Tijuana CC		Tijuana	Baja California	Mexico	Private course
