= Oakdale Golf & Country Club =

Golf and tennis facility in Toronto, Canada

- Interactive map of Oakdale Golf & Country Club
- 43.7313°N 79.5156°W

Club information
- Location: 2388 Jane Street, North York, Toronto, Ontario, Canada
- Established: 1926; 100 years ago
- Type: Private
- Total holes: 27
- Tournaments: Canadian Open (2023)
- Website: oakdalegolf.com
- Designer: Stanley Thompson
- Designer: Robbie Robinson

Oakdale Golf & Country Club, founded in 1926, is a private, parkland-style golf and tennis club located in North York, Toronto, Ontario, Canada. It hosted the 2023 Canadian Open.

== History ==
The club was founded in 1926 and is located about 15 miles north of Toronto's downtown. The course was built on what was farmland decades before the metropolis of Toronto spread and absorbed the property within its limits. Traces of a village have been found on the club grounds, adjacent to the Toronto Carrying-Place Trail. Since its founding, the club has asked its members to give back to the community in one way or another.

In 1926 The Toronto Star ran a story with the headline: "Hebrews buy farm; build golf course." The club is known as predominantly Jewish, as members of the Toronto Jewish community bought the land to establish a Jewish country club in response to antisemitism in Canada in the 1920s and 1930s that strictly excluded Jews from private golf clubs, including the Rosedale Golf Club. Mark Sadowski, former president of the club, said:

It was out of necessity that this club came into being. A hundred years ago the world was a very different place, and there were clubs who would not allow Jewish people to join or even play. And it was the same in the medical community and other aspects of business. There were very clear 'no blacks, no Jews, and no Asians' rules.

However, religion has never been a requirement or barrier to membership, and anyone can join the club, which includes many non-Jews.

It was selected as a new site for the 2023 Canadian Open tournament – the world’s third-oldest national championship – after Golf Canada realized that only a handful of Canadian Opens had been conducted within Toronto itself in the previous several decades. Nick Taylor won the 2023 tournament, becoming the first Canadian citizen to win the Canadian Open since 1954 and the first Canadian-born player to win the event since 1914.

== Course ==
The golf course has 27 holes, 18 designed by Canadian architect Stanley Thompson in the 1920s and 1930s. A third nine was designed by Canadian Golf Hall of Famer Robbie Robinson, a disciple of Thompson, in 1957. Black Creek runs through the course. Each of the three nines are named for famous figures in Canadian golf: Thompson himself, George Knudson (eight-time PGA Tour winner), and Wilf Homenuik (the club's longtime teaching pro). Knudson won 8 tournaments on the PGA tour, and Homenuik won several tournaments as an amateur and Canadian PGA events. Both men were also club professionals at Oakdale.

The June 2023 Canadian Open was played on a 7,460-yard composite routing that used some holes from each of the Homenuik and Thompson nines and all of the Knudson holes as the back nine. It was the first time the course was an RBC Canadian Open host venue. It was the 37th course in the tournament's 117-year history.

== Facilities ==
The club's tennis facilities feature six outdoor courts, with pro shop and offers lessons and competitions.

== PGA Tour events ==
- 2023 Canadian Open – won by Nick Taylor

== See also ==
- Jewish country club
