= Jewish country club =

History of Jewish country clubs

Jewish country clubs are country clubs in the United States and other Western countries whose membership is predominantly Jewish. They emerged in the 19th and 20th centuries as a response to widespread antisemitic exclusion from other elite social clubs. The practice was a form of racial segregation. Consequently, many major American cities have at least one country club of Jewish origin, and in places with larger Jewish communities, several such clubs were established by affluent Jewish individuals of the period.

Although Jews, along with other ethnic and religious minorities, continue to face exclusion from certain country clubs, formal restrictions on Jewish membership began to diminish during the 1970s to 1980s. By the 1990s, particularly following the 1990 PGA Championship, more clubs began admitting Jews, African Americans, and other minority groups. As a result of increased integration and greater choice for affluent Jews, many Jewish country clubs experienced declining membership, with some closing entirely and others evolving into more diverse institutions.

Nevertheless, some clubs, while de jure open to all, may de facto continue to exclude individuals of Jewish heritage through pretexts or subtle forms of discrimination. As a result, Jewish country clubs have retained a distinct identity and continue to exist in major cities across the United States. In the Philadelphia area, however, all but one of the remaining clubs have ceased their affiliation with the Jewish Federation, which was once regarded as a key element of their Jewish character through its role in charitable fundraising.

== Origins ==
Many country clubs in the United States were established around the same time that immigration to the country, including of Jews, began to rise sharply. As antisemitism increased during the early 20th century, Jews, even Jews who once had access to elite White Anglo-Saxon Protestant (WASP) social societies, were blackballed from joining clubs. By the early 20th century, most cities with meaningful Jewish populations had formed country clubs, and by 1928, there were 34 Jewish social and country clubs in the greater New York area, though many Jews still saw the inability to join non-Jewish social organizations as an impediment to assimilating and Americanizing.

Despite having been born of discrimination, Jewish country clubs often discriminated within the Jewish population. In the early years of the 20th century, membership at some clubs was restricted to American and German Jews, though as populations grew and intermarried, Eastern European Jewry such as Russian and Polish Jews were also accepted.

According to a 1962 Anti-Defamation League (ADL) survey of 803 country clubs, 224 were found to be non-discriminatory, while among the predominantly Christian clubs, 89 had quotas on the number of Jewish members and 416 admitted no Jews, though the Jewish Telegraphic Agency noted that social club discrimination was "in retreat" by the mid-1960s. Nevertheless, as late as the 2010s, some country clubs still admit few or no Jews.

Although Jewish country clubs have predominantly Jewish memberships, the clubs themselves are not particularly Jewish in terms of custom or practice—clubs tend to be open on Shabbat and serve non-kosher food. The names and architecture of clubs are not recognizably Jewish and often mimicked the convention of the other, predominantly Protestant country club from which Jews were excluded.

== Gradual decline ==
Beginning in the 1970s and continuing through the 1980s, increasing numbers of Jews were admitted to predominantly WASP country clubs, although progress was often slow. The 1990 PGA Championship drew national attention to discriminatory practices in private clubs and social organisations across the United States. In response, clubs were compelled either to accept greater numbers of African American and Jewish members or to forfeit the opportunity to host future PGA tournaments. While some chose to integrate, others persisted in maintaining restrictions against black and Jewish applicants. In 1990, Tom Watson famously resigned from the Kansas City Country Club over its refusal to admit billionaire H&R Block founder Henry Bloch, who was Jewish.

That freedom to assimilate has however ironically hurt Jewish country clubs. Between intermarriage, more geographically dispersed Jewish populations, fewer golfers, and a decline in country club membership generally, many Jewish country clubs have either had to fold, merge, or lose their Jewish identity. In cities with multiple Jewish country clubs, there is increasing consolidation. Three of the six Jewish country clubs in Baltimore closed between 1985 and 2010, for example.

In addition to demographic changes, the Madoff investment scandal hit Jewish country clubs particularly hard. Bernie Madoff was an avid golfer in both New York and Florida, and many members of Jewish country clubs had invested heavily in his Ponzi scheme.

When Woodmont Country Club, a Jewish country club in the Washington, D.C. area, offered membership to President Barack Obama following the conclusion of his presidency, some members objected due to his administration's policies toward Israel, which they viewed as overly sympathetic to the Palestinian cause. The club ultimately admitted him. Doug Emhoff, the first Jewish spouse of a Vice President, is a member at Hillcrest Country Club in Los Angeles.

== List of historically Jewish country clubs ==
- Amity Country Club in Charlotte, North Carolina
- Beechmont Country Club in Orange, Ohio
- Belmont Country Club in Belmont, Massachusetts
- Brentwood Country Club in Los Angeles, California
- Broadmoor Country Club in Indianapolis, Indiana
- Brynwood Country Club in Milwaukee, Wisconsin
- Carmel Club in Bogotá, Colombia
- Century Country Club in Purchase, New York
- Cranbourne Golf Club in Cranbourne, Victoria, Australia
- Crestview Country Club in Agawam, Massachusetts
- El Caballero Country Club in Tarzana, California
- Engineers Country Club in Roslyn Harbor, New York
- Fenway Golf Club in Scarsdale, New York
- Franklin Hills Country Club in Franklin, Michigan
- Glendale Country Club in Bellevue, Washington
- Green Gables Country Club in Denver, Colorado
- Green Oaks Country Club in Verona, Pennsylvania
- Harmonie Club in Manhattan, New York
- Hillcrest Country Club in Los Angeles, California
- Idlewild Country Club in Flossmoor, Illinois
- Indian Spring Country Club in Indian Spring, Silver Spring, Maryland
- Inwood Country Club in Inwood, New York
- Irondequoit Country Club in Rochester, New York
- Jefferson Lakeside Country Club in Richmond, Virginia
- Kernwood Country Club in Salem, Massachusetts
- Knollwood Country Club in West Bloomfield, Michigan
- Lake Merced Golf Club in Daly City, California
- Lake Shore Country Club in Glencoe, Illinois
- Losantiville Country Club in Cincinnati, Ohio
- Meadowbrook Country Club in Ballwin, Missouri
- Meadowbrook Country Club in Clayton, Ohio
- Meadowbrook Country Club in Tulsa, Oklahoma
- Monash Country Club in Ingleside, New South Wales, Australia
- Moor Allerton Golf Club in Leeds, England
- Mountain Ridge Country Club in West Caldwell, New Jersey
- Oak Ridge Country Club in Hopkins, Minnesota
- Oakdale Golf & Country Club in Toronto, Ontario
- Oakwood Country Club in Cleveland Heights, Ohio
- Oakwood Country Club in Kansas City, Missouri
- Palm Beach Country Club in Palm Beach, Florida
- Philmont Country Club in Huntingdon Valley, Pennsylvania
- Pine Brook Country Club in Weston, Massachusetts
- Pine Tree Country Club in Birmingham, Alabama
- Quaker Ridge Golf Club in Scarsdale, New York
- Richmond Country Club in Richmond, British Columbia
- Seawane Country Club in Hewlett Harbor, New York
- The Standard Club in Johns Creek, Georgia
- Standard Club in Louisville, Kentucky
- The Suburban Club in Pikesville, Maryland
- Sunningdale Country Club in Scarsdale, New York
- Tualatin Country Club in Tualatin, Oregon
- Tumble Brook Country Club in Bloomfield, Connecticut
- Twin Orchard Country Club in Long Grove, Illinois
- Westmoreland Country Club in Export, Pennsylvania
- Westwood Country Club in Buffalo, New York
- Westwood Country Club in Houston, Texas
- Woodcrest Country Club in Cherry Hill, New Jersey
- Woodholme Country Club in Pikesville, Maryland
- Woodmont Country Club in Rockville, Maryland

== See also ==
- Country club
- Gentleman's Agreement
- Membership discrimination in California clubs
- Red Oaks, an Amazon Prime Video series set at a Jewish country club
