= Torrey Pines Golf Course =

Municipal public golf course owned by the city of San Diego, California

- Location within the United States Location within California
- 32.9045°N 117.2454°W

Club information
- Location: San Diego, California
- Elevation: 380 feet (115 m)
- Established: 1957, 69 years ago
- Type: Public
- Owner: City of San Diego
- Operator: City of San Diego
- Total holes: 36
- Tournaments: The Sentry; Genesis Invitational (2025); U.S. Open (2008, 2021)
- Website: sandiego.gov/torrey-pines

South Course
- Designed by: William Francis Bell
- Par: 72
- Length: 7,802 yards (7,134 m)
- Course rating: 78.8
- Slope rating: 148

North Course
- Designed by: William Francis Bell
- Par: 72
- Length: 7,258 yards (6,637 m)
- Course rating: 75.8
- Slope rating: 134
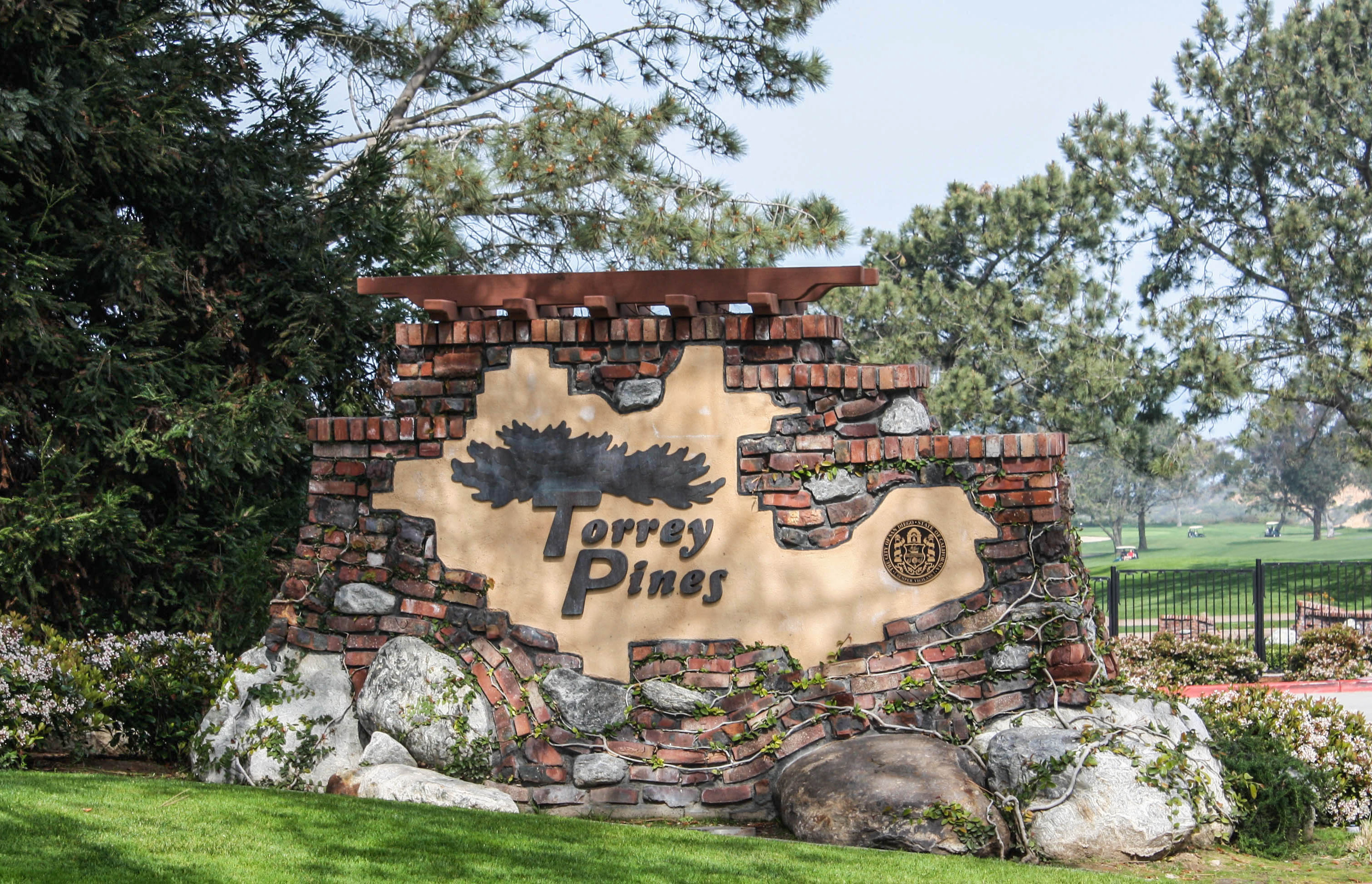

Torrey Pines Golf Course is a public municipal golf facility in the La Jolla community of San Diego, California, United States. The 36-hole course sits on the coastal cliffs overlooking the Pacific Ocean, just south of Torrey Pines State Natural Reserve.

Opened in 1957, it was built on the site of Camp Callan, a U.S. Army installation during World War II. Torrey Pines has two 18-hole courses, North and South, designed by William Francis Bell. The course is named for the Torrey pine, a rare tree that grows in the area.

Since the late 1960s, Torrey Pines has hosted The Sentry, a tournament on the PGA Tour originally known as the San Diego Open. Held annually in January or February, the tournament uses both courses for the first two rounds and the South Course for the final two rounds. The South Course has hosted two U.S. Open championships: Tiger Woods won in 2008 and Jon Rahm won in 2021.

Torrey Pines hosted the Genesis Invitational in February 2025 after the tournament's home course, the Riviera Country Club, was affected by the Southern California wildfires.

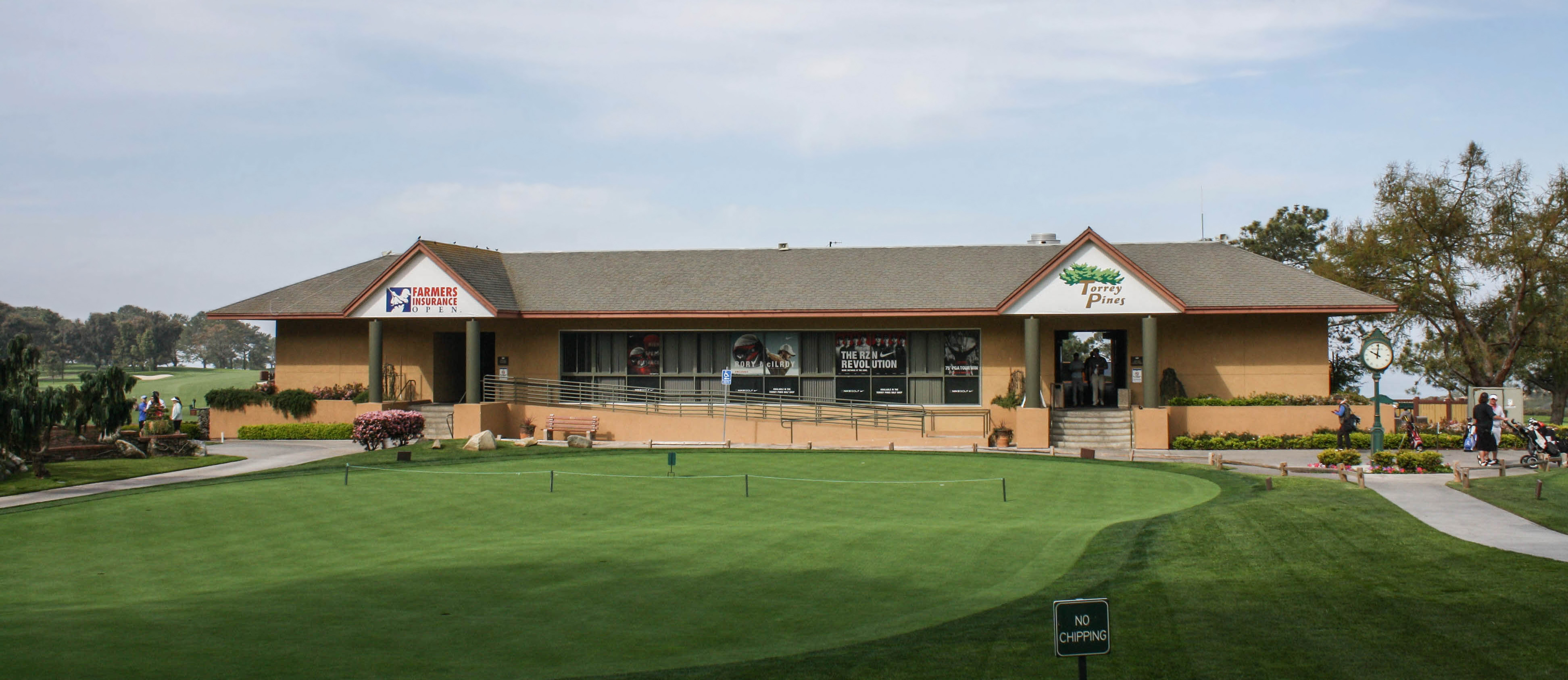
Clubhouse at Torrey Pines

== 2008 U.S. Open ==
Tiger Woods won the 2008 U.S. Open over Rocco Mediate in a 19-hole Monday playoff. After completing the 18-hole playoff on the South Course tied at even par 71, they went to sudden-death on the 91st hole, played on the par-4 7th hole. Mediate had trouble off of the tee and made bogey, while Woods made par to gain his third U.S. Open and fourteenth career major title, which put him just four behind Jack Nicklaus. He birdied the final hole on Sunday to force the playoff and again on Monday to extend it. At age 32, Woods won while playing with a stress fracture and torn ACL; this was his last major title until 2019. This was the last U.S. Open to feature an 18-hole playoff (the USGA changed the U.S. Open playoff format to a two-hole aggregate playoff in 2018); as of 2025, it was also the most recent time the U.S. Open ended in a playoff.

== Popular culture ==
Torrey Pines is a featured golf course in the Links: The Challenge of Golf (1990), Microsoft Golf 2.0 (1995), Tiger Woods PGA Tour 2003, Tiger Woods PGA Tour 10, Tiger Woods PGA Tour 13, and Tiger Woods PGA Tour 14.

Scott Peterson, previously on death row for the murder of his wife Laci, was arrested in the parking lot of Torrey Pines in April 2003.

== Major tournaments hosted ==
Year	Tournament	Winner	Winning score	Margin of victory	Runner-up
2008	U.S. Open	(United States) Tiger Woods	283 (−1)	Playoff	(United States) Rocco Mediate
2021	U.S. Open	(Spain) Jon Rahm	278 (−6)	1 stroke	(South Africa) Louis Oosthuizen

== North Course ==
The North Course is shorter (from the men's tees) and rated less difficult than the South Course. All measurements are made in yards.

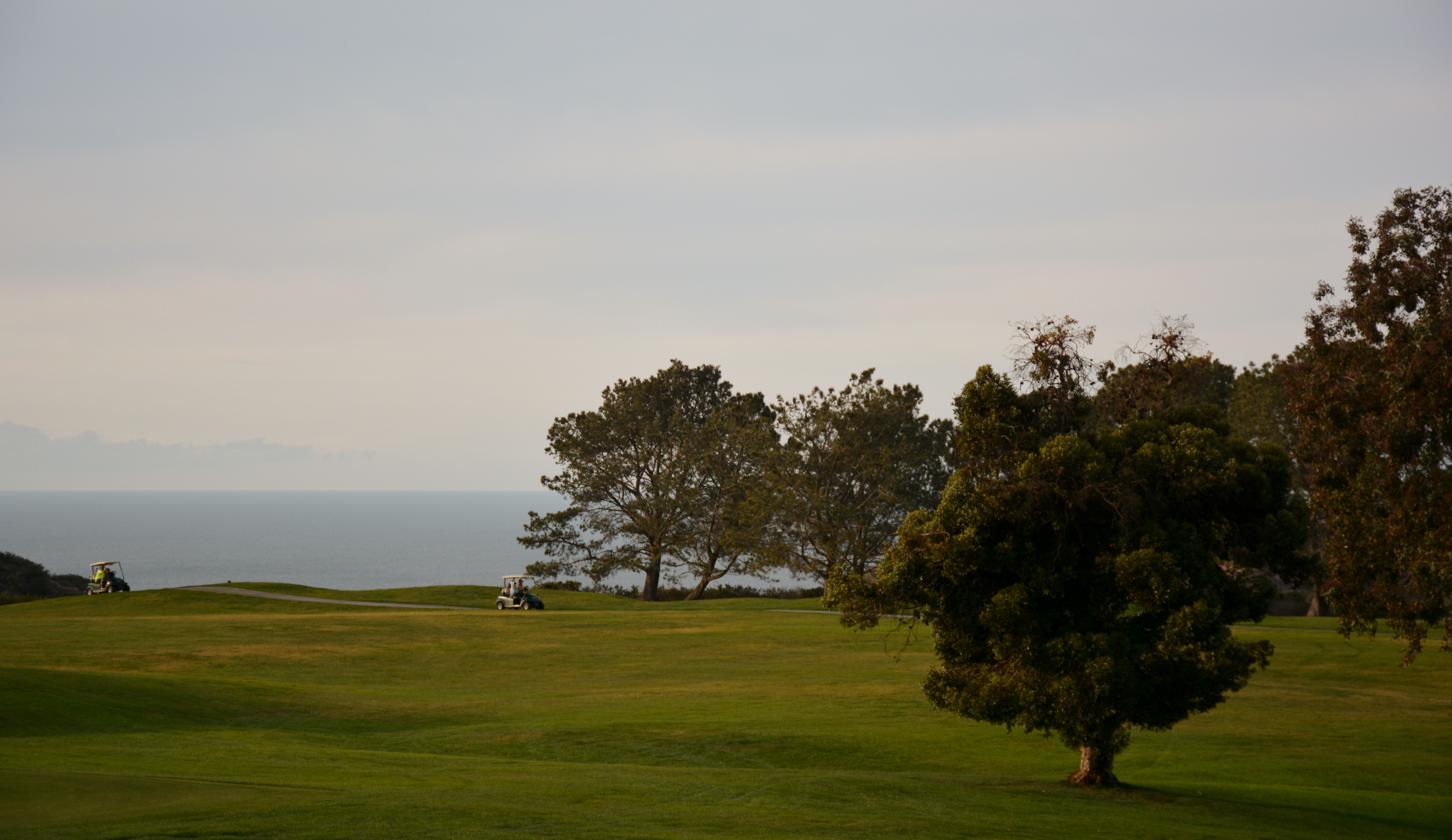
The golf course in 2016

Tee	Rating/Slope	1	2	3	4	5	6	7	8	9	Out	10	11	12	13	14	15	16	17	18	In	Total
Par		4	4	3	4	5	4	4	3	5	36	5	4	3	4	4	3	4	5	4	36	72
Black	75.8 / 134	421	495	241	479	525	416	322	214	556	3,669	536	339	203	459	451	202	393	520	486	3,589	7,258
Brown	73.6 / 129	410	431	215	433	503	400	290	174	512	3,368	524	337	174	430	408	177	388	520	455	3,413	6,781
Green	M:71.5/125 W:77.5/133	395	412	164	416	483	389	290	167	476	3,192	506	321	155	399	352	165	345	486	422	3,151	6,343
White	M:69.3/120 W:74.7/129	351	355	145	337	437	380	274	161	460	2,920	460	310	108	383	340	145	336	472	373	2,927	5,847
Yellow	M:66.0/112 W:71.9/128	322	344	138	317	424	309	233	128	401	2,616	422	258	101	306	292	141	308	404	342	2,574	5,190
SI	Men	5	1	13	3	11	7	17	15	9		12	18	14	4	6	16	8	10	2
SI	Women	3	7	15	1	11	5	13	17	9		14	18	8	2	12	6	10	16	4

== South Course ==
At 7,802 yards (7,134 m), the South Course is the longest course played in a regular PGA Tour event.

Tee	Rating/Slope	1	2	3	4	5	6	7	8	9	Out	10	11	12	13	14	15	16	17	18	In	Total
Par		4	4	3	4	4	5	4	3	5	36	4	3	4	5	4	4	3	4	5	36	72
Black	M:78.8/148	451	389	201	490	454	564	462	177	615	3,803	454	225	505	621	437	517	227	443	570	3,999	7,802
Brown	M:75.0/139 W:82.6/152	434	361	159	462	404	530	443	161	535	3,489	371	202	458	539	414	394	204	422	522	3,526	7,015
Green	M:73.3/134 W:80.3/147	419	344	146	420	393	505	424	149	514	3,314	352	190	444	514	394	355	183	398	491	3,321	6,635
White	M:70.9/128 W:77.6/140	409	323	142	384	382	449	387	139	457	3,072	308	171	411	486	359	339	151	375	473	3,073	6,145
Yellow	M:67.2/119 W:73.3/131	350	283	106	353	320	431	378	90	432	2,743	294	104	370	407	277	276	142	346	414	2,630	5,373
