= William Francis Bell =

American golf course architect (1918–1984)

- Born: William Francis Bell; August 8, 1918; Pasadena, California, US
- Died: September 20, 1984 (aged 66); Pasadena, California, US
- Occupation: Golf course architect
- Known for: Golf course architect
- Board member of: American Society of Golf Course Architects
- Spouse: Dell Applebury
- Children: William Park Bell II (1952–1992)
- Parent: William P. Bell

William Francis Bell (August 8, 1918 – September 20, 1984) was a golf course architect, active from the 1960s into the early 1980s.

== Biography ==
William Francis Bell was born in Pasadena, California, the son of noted architect William Park Bell, and was affectionately known as "Billy Bell Jr.". He studied at University of Southern California in Los Angeles.

The courses Bell designed are predominantly located in the Western United States. Bell is considered a commercial golf course architect with more than 200 courses credited to his work and design, mostly in the American West and Hawaii. Notably, Bell was the golf architect for Torrey Pines Golf Course, both Torrey Pines North course and Torrey Pines South course, site of the 2008 and 2021 US Open.

Bell was elected into The American Society of Golf Course Architects (ASGCA) in 1950 and served as ASGCA President from 1957 to 1958. Bell was elected in 2017 to the Southern California Golf Association Hall of Fame for his contribution to the sport of golf.

Bell's Mesa Verde Country Club hosted the PGA Tour Orange County Open Invitational from 1959 - 1962 with notable champions Tony Lema and Billy Casper. LPGA Nancy Lopez won at Mesa Verde Country Club in 1984.

Bell's Bermuda Dunes Country Club hosted the PGA Tour's Desert Classic for 49 years.

Bell's Newport Beach Country Club course has hosted the Hoag Classic on the PGA Tour Champions from 1995 - 2022.

Bell's Saticoy Club hosted the LPGA Mediheal Championship in October 2022.

Following a $25 million renovation, Bell's Industry Hills course has been home to the Southern California Section of the PGA of America since 2016. Industry Hills Eisenhower course has hosted several professional tournaments:

- LPGA 1980 Olympia Gold Classic
- LPGA 2011 Kia Classic.
- 2011 U.S. Women's Open Qualifying.
- 2016 U.S. Women's Open Qualifying.

== Notable courses ==
The following is a list of notable courses designed by William F. Bell:

- OD denotes courses for which William F. Bell is the original designer
- R denotes courses reconstructed by William F. Bell
- A denotes courses for which William F. Bell made substantial additions
- E denotes courses that William F. Bell examined and on the construction of which he consulted

Name	Contribution	Year built	City / Town	State / Province	Country	Comments
Bakersfield CC	OD		Bakersfield	California	United States	Private, with William P. Bell
Industry Hills GC (Ike Course)	OD	1979	City of Industry	California	United States	
Industry Hills GC (Babe Course)	OD	1980	City of Industry	California	United States	
Tamarisk CC	OD	1952	Rancho Mirage	California	United States	
Torrey Pines GC (North Course, South Course)	OD	1957	La Jolla, San Diego	California	United States	
