= Brookside Golf Course =

Golf facility in Pasadena, California

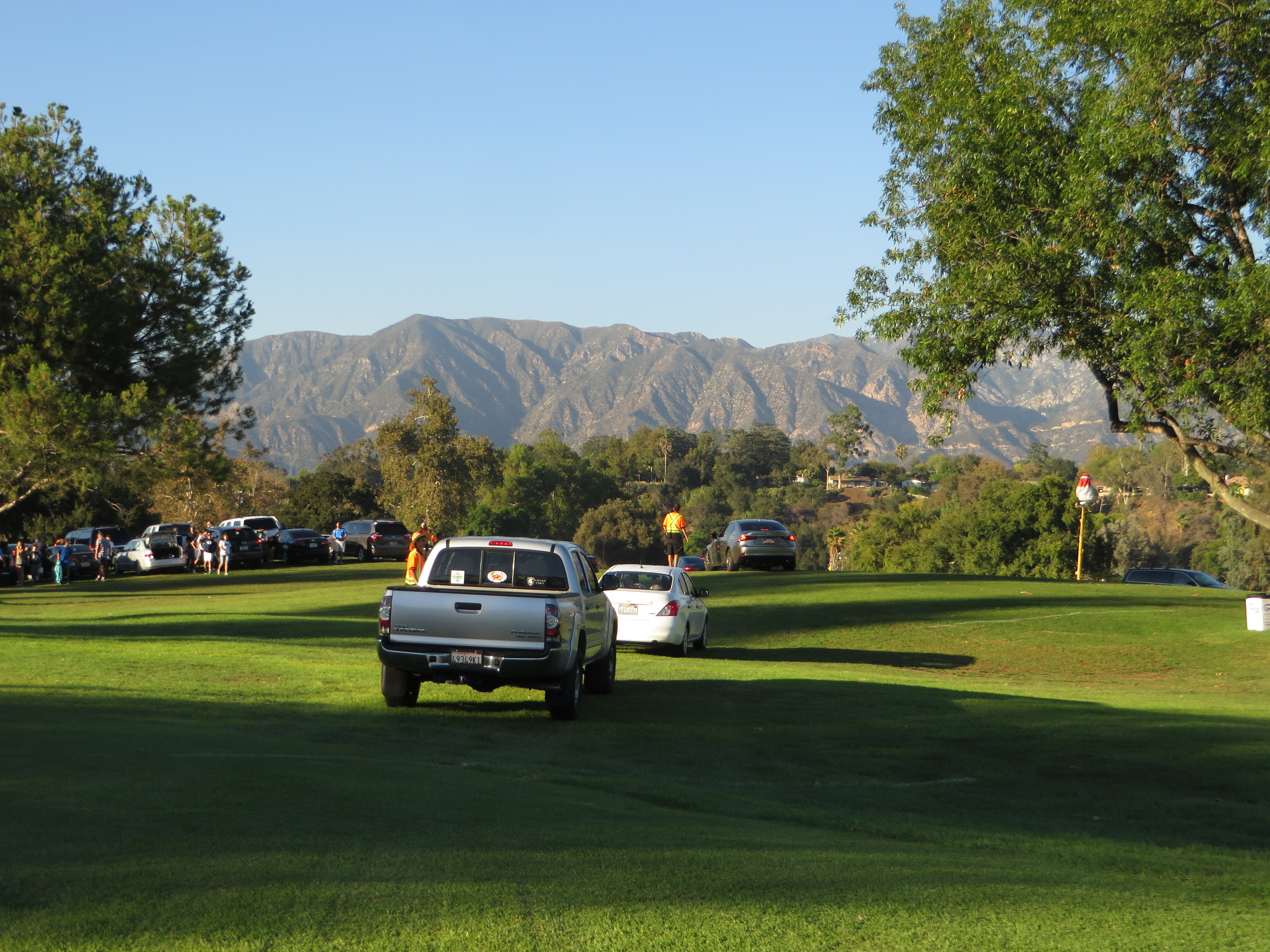

- Location in the United States Location in California
- 34.165°N 118.167°W

Club information
- Location: 1133 Rosemont Ave. Pasadena, California, U.S.
- Type: Public
- Owner: City of Pasadena
- Operator: American Golf
- Tota holes: 36
- Tournaments: Los Angeles Open (PGA Tour - 1968)
- Website: brooksidegc.com

C.W. Koiner Course (#1)
- Designed by: William P. Bell
- Par: 72
- Length: 7,228 yards (6,609 m)
- Course rating: 74.5
- Slope rating: 133

E.O. Nay Course (#2)
- Designed by: William P. Bell
- Par: 70
- Length: 6,046 yards (5,528 m)
- Course rating: 69.1
- Slope rating: 121

Brookside Golf Course is a municipal golf facility located in Pasadena, California, United States. Adjacent to the Rose Bowl stadium in the city's Arroyo Seco Natural Park, the 36-hole facility offers the C.W. Koiner Course (#1) and the shorter E.O. Nay Course (#2), divided by the concrete-channeled Arroyo Seco.

Both courses were designed by architect William P. Bell and the complex features a restaurant, banquet facilities, meeting rooms, pro shop, two practice putting greens, a chipping area, a practice bunker, and a driving range. The course hosted the Los Angeles Open on the PGA Tour in 1968, won by Billy Casper in late January.

== C.W. Koiner Course ==
The par-72 C.W. Koiner Course (#1) measures over 7,200 yards (6,580 m), and is centrally run along the western and southern ends of the complex. Relatively flat, it has many strategically placed bunkers, long rough, and tricky greens to place a premium on accuracy. This course is more open than the E.O. Nay Course and also appeals to the better player looking for a challenge.

== E.O. Nay Course ==
The E.O. Nay Course (#2) is the shorter of the two courses, measuring just over 6,000 yards (5,490 m), and is centrally run along the northern end of the complex. Similarly featured, this par-70 course is relatively flat, the key difference between the courses is the smaller hitting areas of the E.O. Nay Course, and this course usually serves those of a lesser ability.

== Alternate uses and availability ==
During football season and for special events, the courses are used as a parking lot for fans. The Rose Bowl (located next door) uses the course for extra parking during home games for the UCLA Bruins football team (since 1982) and for the annual New Year's Day Rose Bowl Game. In 2010 and 2014, it was used for the BCS National Championship Games. This has not proven detrimental to the quality of the course. It does, however, impact availability of the course during UCLA home games and other special events.

On December 30, 2009, the clubhouse hosted the twentieth anniversary of the Rose Bowl Hall of Fame induction ceremony, which was hosted by the Pasadena Quarterbacks Club, with Keith Jackson as the master of ceremonies.
