= Riviera Country Club =

Private golf and tennis club in California

The Riviera Country Club
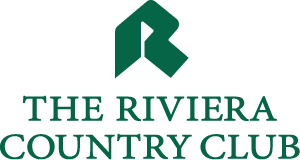

- Location in the United States Location in California Location in Los Angeles metropolitan area
- 34.05°N 118.50°W

Club information
- Location: Pacific Palisades, California
- Elevation: 180–330 feet (55–100 m)
- Established: 1926, 100 years ago
- Type: Private
- Total holes: 18
- Tournaments: Genesis Invitational - (PGA Tour); 1948 U.S. Open; 1983 PGA Championship; 1995 PGA Championship; 1998 U.S. Senior Open; 2017 U.S. Amateur; 2026 U.S. Women's Open
- Greens: Poa annua
- Fairways: Kikuyu
- Website: therivieracountryclub.com
- Designed by: George C. Thomas Jr., William P. Bell
- Par: 71
- Length: 7,400 yards (6,800 m)
- Course rating: 76.3
- Slope rating: 144
- Course record: 61 (−10) - Ted Tryba (February 21, 1997)
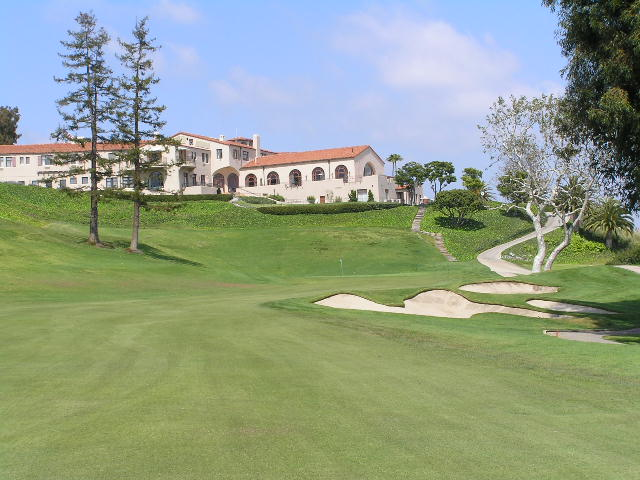
- 18th hole and clubhouse in 2006

The Riviera Country Club is a private club with a championship golf course as well as tennis courts, located in the Pacific Palisades neighborhood of the Westside of Los Angeles, California.

The Riviera was designed by golf course architects George C. Thomas Jr. and William P. Bell, it has been the primary host for the Genesis Invitational (originally the Los Angeles Open), an annual event on the PGA Tour in February. The 2026 edition was the 62nd held at Riviera.

The Riviera has hosted three major championships: the U.S. Open in 1948, and the PGA Championship in 1983 and 1995. In addition, it was site of the U.S. Senior Open, a senior major, in 1998 and the U.S. Amateur in August 2017. The club is scheduled to host the 2026 U.S. Women's Open. The club is also scheduled to host golf at the Summer Olympics in 2028. It was announced the club would host the 131st U.S. Open in 2031. It will be the second time the club has hosted a U.S. Open.

== History ==
When the country club and course opened 100 years ago in 1926, it was known as the Los Angeles Athletic Club Golf Course. William P. Bell helped Thomas in the design and planning of the course. They were in charge of assembling a labor force to build the course from scratch in the Santa Monica Canyon. The entire country club and golf course cost $243,827 to build; at the time, it was one of the most expensive in golf course history. The course has been modified a few times, most notably in 1992 when Ben Crenshaw and Bill Coore redesigned the bunkers to look as they did when the course opened.

The country club prospered in the 1930s; it hosted the dressage equestrian and the riding part of the modern pentathlon events for the 1932 Summer Olympics. The Riviera Equestrian Center was where prominent riders like Egan Merz trained younger people like Elizabeth Taylor how to ride; Taylor, then a child star, was preparing for her role in the 1944 movie National Velvet.

According to a story told about Randy Newman, in the early 1950s, the club did not allow Jews on the premises.

The 1952 movie Pat and Mike, starring Katharine Hepburn and Babe Zaharias, was filmed at Riviera, as was The Caddy, starring Jerry Lewis and Dean Martin, with a cameo appearance by Ben Hogan, and Follow the Sun, about Hogan, starring Glenn Ford and Anne Baxter. During the silent era, the 1927 movie Spring Fever was filmed at the new club, in which it was called Oakmont Country Club.

Riviera has had many famous members, which included Humphrey Bogart, Glen Campbell, Vic Damone, Peter Falk, Jack Ging, Dean Martin, Gregory Peck, Walt Disney, Hal Roach, Douglas Fairbanks, Mary Pickford, and O. J. Simpson. The actor Conrad Veidt died suddenly of a heart attack in 1943 while playing golf at the club.

Willie Hunter, the 1921 British Amateur champion and six-time PGA Tour winner, served as the head professional from 1936 to 1964. His son, Mac Hunter, was head pro from 1964 to 1973. Willie Hunter helped save the course from severe flooding in 1939, and helped rescue the club from bankruptcy during World War II.

== PGA Tour ==
Riviera hosted the Los Angeles Open in 1929 and 1930, then nine consecutive years from 1945 through 1953. It returned in 1973, where it has remained, with the exception of 1983,1998, and 2025 for a total of 62 times through 2026.

The course is well known for Ben Hogan, and the course has been called "Hogan's Alley" (a moniker shared with Colonial Country Club in Texas). Hogan won the L.A. Open three times (1942, 1947, 1948), finished second once (1946), and won the U.S. Open in 1948; all were at Riviera except the 1942 event (at Hillcrest). Other notable winners at Riviera include Sam Snead, Byron Nelson, Hale Irwin, Tom Watson, Johnny Miller, Ben Crenshaw, Bubba Watson, Mark Calcavecchia, Fred Couples, Corey Pavin, Craig Stadler, Nick Faldo, Ernie Els, Mike Weir, and Phil Mickelson. Hal Sutton won the PGA Championship in August 1983, and Steve Elkington in 1995. More than 22 years after his win in 1976, Irwin won the U.S. Senior Open at Riviera in July 1998.

More recent winners at Riviera include Rory Sabbatini in 2006, and Charles Howell III, who won in 2007 in a sudden-death playoff against Phil Mickelson. In 2008, the first as the Northern Trust Open, Mickelson hung on for a two-shot win over Jeff Quinney to win for the first time at Riviera. This win gave Mickelson at least one win in every West Coast Swing event. Australian Adam Scott ended a near four-year title drought on the US PGA Tour after beginning the final round of the event in a share of the lead and a Sunday 70 gave him an 11-under-par (273) total to win the Genesis Open in 2020 just prior to the Tour shutting down due to the COVID-19 pandemic.

Notable exceptions to the list of winners are Jack Nicklaus and Tiger Woods. Nicklaus' best finish in the L.A. Open was at age 38 in 1978, two strokes back as solo runner-up after an uncharacteristic stumble, relinquishing the lead late in the final round. Five years later at the PGA Championship, he was one stroke behind champion Sutton.

As a high school sophomore from Cypress in neighboring Orange County, Woods played his very first PGA Tour event, on a sponsor's exemption (as an amateur) at Riviera in 1992; he shot 72–75 and missed the cut by six strokes. His best finish at L.A. was in 1998, when the Nissan Open was held at the Valencia Country Club (Riviera was being prepared for the U.S. Senior Open). Woods shot 65–66 on the weekend, but lost in a playoff to Billy Mayfair, one of only two playoff losses on tour (15–2 through February 2014). Woods finished tied for second in 1999 and had top-10 finishes in 2003 and 2004. The 2005 event had only two rounds due to rain; Woods finished 13th. He played at Riviera in 2006, also rain-plagued, but withdrew after two rounds due to illness, missed the next eleven editions, then returned in 2018 at age 42.

== Notable events ==
Year	Tournament	Winner	Winner's share ($)
1948	U.S. Open	(United States) Ben Hogan	2,000
1983	PGA Championship	(United States) Hal Sutton	100,000
1995	PGA Championship	(Australia) Steve Elkington	360,000
1998	U.S. Senior Open	(United States) Hale Irwin	267,500
2017	U.S. Amateur	(United States) Doc Redman	—N/a
2026	U.S. Women's Open	(United States) Nelly Korda	2,500,000
2028	Olympic Games		
2031	U.S. Open		

== General information ==
The greens at Riviera are Poa annua, common for the West, but the fairways and rough are Kikuyu grass. A tough, dense pasture grass originally from East Africa, it had been used at a nearby polo field in the 1930s and was also planted on hillsides to prevent erosion. Over the years, it gradually invaded the course and became the dominant species. Kikuyu provides optimal lies on close-mown fairways, but is very challenging in the spongy rough.

Guests at Riviera must play the course with a member. For the dress code, denim is not allowed; a collared shirt and either Bermuda shorts or slacks are required.

== The course ==
The course is a par 71, at a length of 7,013 yards (6,413 m) from the back tees (which has been lengthened to 7,322 yards (6,695 m) for Tour play), 6,531 yards (5,972 m) from the middle tees, and 5,907 yards (5,401 m) from the forward tees. The men's slope ratings are 74.6/135 and 72.2/130 for the back and middle tees, respectively. The ladies' slope rating is 74.3/142 for the forward tees.

The course record for competitive play is 61, ten under par, shot by Ted Tryba in 1999 in the third round of the Nissan Open, and included a bogey on 18. Tryba was the runner-up that year to Ernie Els. The course record for the lowest nine holes is 28 (seven under par on the front nine), shot by Andrew Magee in the opening round in 1991 (followed by a 38 on the back nine for a 66). He finished the tournament four strokes back, tied for eighth.

=== Front nine ===
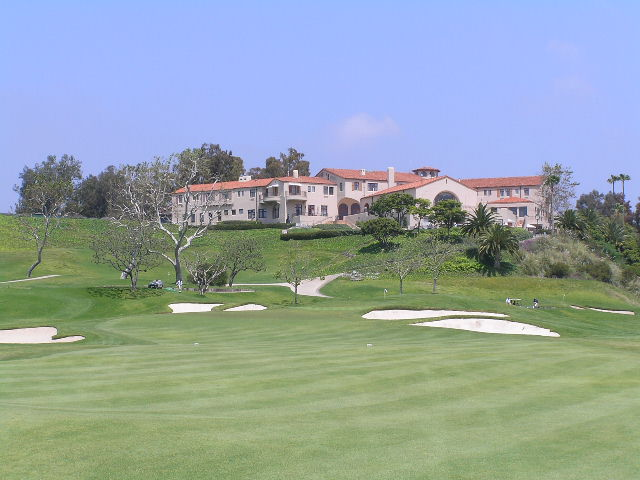
Ninth hole in 2006

The first hole, a short par five, is a relatively easy beginning hole. The tee is elevated 75 feet (23 m) above the fairway, tempting players to hit driver but out of bounds on the left side and a barranca crossing the fairway make players cautious. Scores range from eagle to double bogey. The second hole is a long par-four that plays uphill and into the wind, and is the number one handicap hole. The third is medium-length and also plays into a breeze.

The fourth hole is rather long, which Hogan called the "best par three in America," while the fifth plays into the wind and is almost on the side of the hill. The par-three sixth hole is world-famous for the bunker in the middle of the green. If a player is on the wrong side of the green, they will have to make a tough decision to either putt around or chip over the bunker.

The last three holes of the front are all par-four. The narrow fairway at the seventh is difficult to hit, and the long eighth hole has two fairways separated by a dry ditch. The ninth, long and uphill, is known for its well-placed fairway bunkers.

=== Back nine ===
The tenth hole is a very short, 315-yard (288 m) par four known as a risk-reward hole. Longer hitters can try to drive the green from the tee, but accuracy is a priority, as several bunkers surround the green. The eleventh is a long par-five where eucalyptus trees and a barranca come into play. The twelfth is a long par-four, often into the wind, that plays to a narrow green surrounded by the barranca, bunkers, and trees; Bogey's Tree is named after actor Humphrey Bogart.

The thirteenth is a tough driving hole, with the barranca on the left side and eucalyptus along the right. The fourteenth is an easy par-three with Riviera's largest green, but it is multi-tiered, which makes putting difficult. The fifteenth hole is a dogleg par-four to the right that features another large green; it's two-tiered, so the ball needs to be on the proper level. This hole plays into the breeze of the Pacific Ocean, slightly over a mile (1.6 km) away, and is often pivotal in determining a champion.

The sixteenth hole is the course's final par-three, featuring a small green surrounded by bunkers. The seventeenth hole, Riviera's longest, routes uphill and northeast toward the clubhouse. The eighteenth hole begins with a blind uphill tee shot and concludes at a green situated within a natural amphitheater below the clubhouse.

=== Scorecard ===
Riviera Country Club
Tee	Rating/Slope	1	2	3	4	5	6	7	8	9	Out	10	11	12	13	14	15	16	17	18	In	Total
2024 Genesis Invitational		503	471	434	236	434	199	408	433	458	3,576	315	583	479	459	192	487	166	590	475	3,746	7,322
Black	75.6 / 137	503	463	434	236	434	199	408	433	458	3,568	315	564	479	459	176	487	166	590	475	3,711	7,279
Blue	74.6 / 135	503	463	434	236	419	175	408	416	420	3,474	315	564	410	438	176	443	166	576	451	3,539	7,013
White	72.2 /130	497	445	405	223	408	144	370	375	406	3,273	301	513	367	406	159	430	148	512	422	3,258	6,531
Par		5	4	4	3	4	3	4	4	4	35	4	5	4	4	3	4	3	5	4	36	71
SI		17	1	5	7	11	15	9	13	3		16	10	8	6	18	2	14	12	4
Women's	74.3 / 142	450	393	371	186	386	130	318	350	386	2,970	275	484	317	354	142	411	125	498	331	2,937	5,907
Par		5	5	4	3	4	3	4	4	5	37	4	5	4	4	3	5	3	5	4	37	74
SI		5	15	1	7	3	17	9	13	11		12	2	6	4	18	14	16	8	10
