= Wilshire Country Club =

Private golf club in Los Angeles, California, United States

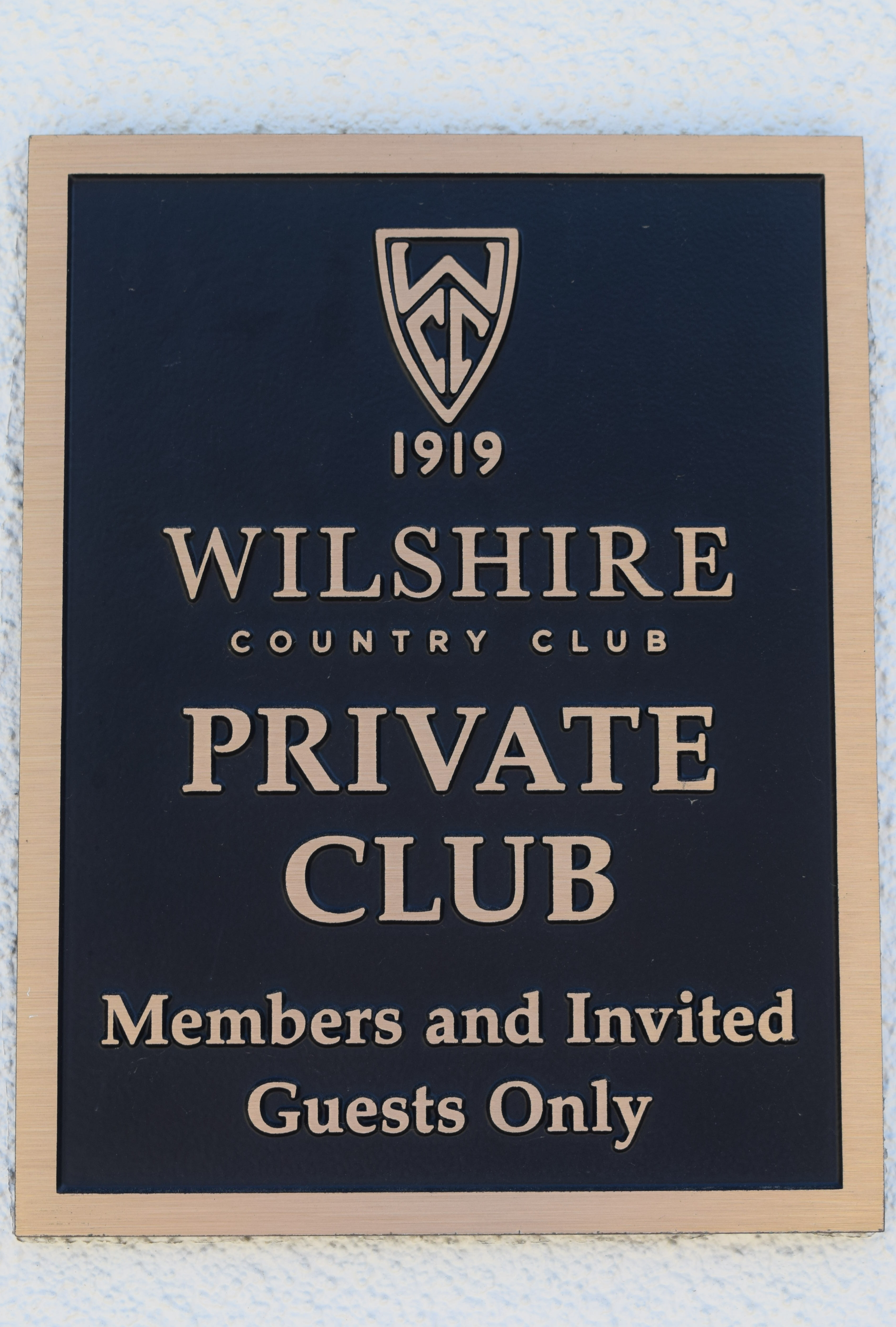
- Plaque for the club

- Location within the United States Location within California
- 34.077°N 118.328°W

Club information
- Location: Hancock Park; 301 N. Rossmore Avenue; Los Angeles, California
- Elevation: 250 feet (75 m)
- Established: 1919, 107 years ago
- Type: Private
- Tota holes: 18
- Tournaments: Hugel-JTBC LA Open (2018–2020); Los Angeles Open (1928, 1931, 1933, 1944)
- Greens: Poa annua
- Fairways: Tifway 419 hybrid Bermuda
- Website: wilshirecountryclub.com
- Designed by: Norman Macbeth
- Par: 71
- Length: 6,506 yards (5,949 m)
- Course rating: 71.8
- Slope rating: 132
- Course record: 61 – Ellsworth Vines; Jerry Barber

Wilshire Country Club is an 18-hole private golf club on the West Coast of the United States, located in Los Angeles, California.

The club in Hancock Park was founded 107 years ago in 1919 and its Norman Macbeth-designed course opened the following year. South of Hollywood and six miles (10 km) northwest of downtown, it is bisected by Beverly Boulevard, connected by a narrow tunnel: the outgoing nine is on the south side, with the incoming nine and clubhouse on the north side.

== Tour events ==
Wilshire was the site of the Los Angeles Open on the PGA Tour four times (1928, 1931, 1933, 1944) and the SBC Senior Classic on the senior tour for six seasons (1995–2000). On the LPGA Tour, it hosted the Office Depot Championship in 2001 and the LA Open, from 2018 to 2022. In 2023, the tournament moves to the Palos Verdes Golf Club.

== Club professionals ==
Notables who have served as the club professional include Olin Dutra, Ellsworth Vines, and Jerry Barber; the latter two hold the course record of 61.

== Course ==
Hole	Yards	Par	Hole	Yards	Par
1	390	4	10	156	3
2	527	5	11	366	4
3	347	4	12	406	4
4	170	3	13	185	3
5	378	4	14	513	5
6	430	4	15	330	4
7	141	3	16	556	5
8	380	4	17	364	4
9	428	4	18	439	4
Out	3,191	35	In	3,315	36
Source:			Total	6,506	71

- For the Hugel-JTBC LA Open in 2018, hole #10 was the final hole.
