= 1995 PGA Championship =

Coordinates: 34.050°N 118.501°W

Tournament information
- Dates: August 10–13, 1995
- Location: Los Angeles, California
- Course: Riviera Country Club
- Organized by: PGA of America
- Tour: PGA Tour

Statistics
- Par: 71
- Length: 6,956 yards (6,361 m)
- Field: 150 players, 72 after cut
- Cut: 142 (E)
- Prize fund: $2.0 million
- Winner's share: $360,000

Champion
- (Australia) Steve Elkington
- 267 (−17), playoff

Location in the United States

The 1995 PGA Championship was the 77th PGA Championship, held August 10–13 at Riviera Country Club in Los Angeles, California. Steve Elkington shot a final round 64 (−7) and won his only major championship in a sudden-death playoff. Elkington sank a 20-foot (6 m) birdie putt on the first playoff hole (par 4, 18th) to defeat Colin Montgomerie. Ernie Els, the third round leader, shot 72 (+1) and finished two strokes back, in a tie for third with Jeff Maggert. His 197 after 54 holes was the lowest-ever for a major championship.

A new 72-hole scoring record for the PGA Championship was set at 267, the second straight year for a new low. Bobby Nichols' 271 in 1964 stood for thirty years, until Nick Price had 269 in 1994. The record was lowered by two strokes in 2001.

Elkington became the fourth Australian-born player to win the PGA Championship, preceded by Jim Ferrier in 1947, David Graham in 1979, and Wayne Grady in 1990. The next was Jason Day in 2015.

Brad Faxon shot a final round 63 to climb to fifth place and earned a spot on the Ryder Cup team. His record was 1–2–0 in his first Ryder Cup, as the U.S. team narrowly lost at home.

This was the third major championship at Riviera, which previously hosted the U.S. Open in 1948 and the PGA Championship in 1983. It was the fourth PGA Championship in California (1929, 1977, 1983), and the last until 2020.

== Round summaries ==
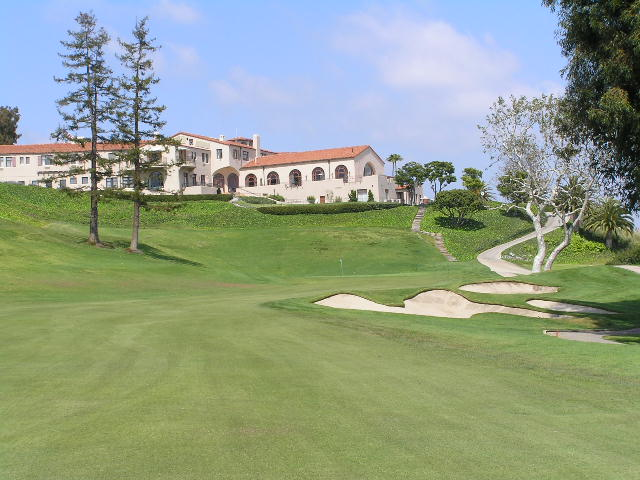
Finishing hole at Riviera Country Club

=== First round ===
Thursday, August 10, 1995

| Place | Player | Score | To par |
|---|---|---|---|
| 1 | (United States) Michael Bradley | 63 | −8 |
| T2 | (United States) Jim Gallagher Jr. | 64 | −7 |
| T2 | (United States) Mark O'Meara | 64 | −7 |
| 4 | (United States) John Adams | 65 | −6 |
| T5 | (United States) Chip Beck | 66 | −5 |
| T5 | (South Africa) Ernie Els | 66 | −5 |
| T5 | (United States) Lee Janzen | 66 | −5 |
| T5 | (United States) Jeff Maggert | 66 | −5 |
| T5 | (United States) Gil Morgan | 66 | −5 |
| T5 | (Australia) Greg Norman | 66 | −5 |

=== Second round ===
Friday, August 11, 1995

| Place | Player | Score | To par |
|---|---|---|---|
| T1 | (South Africa) Ernie Els | 66-65=131 | −11 |
| T1 | (United States) Mark O'Meara | 64-67=131 | −11 |
| 3 | (United States) Justin Leonard | 68-66=134 | −8 |
| T4 | (United States) Brian Claar | 68-67=135 | −7 |
| T4 | (Australia) Steve Elkington | 68-67=135 | −7 |
| T4 | (United States) Jeff Maggert | 66-69=135 | −7 |
| T4 | (Scotland) Colin Montgomerie | 68-67=135 | −7 |
| T4 | (Australia) Greg Norman | 66-69=135 | −7 |
| T9 | (United States) Michael Bradley | 63-73=136 | −6 |
| T9 | (New Zealand) Michael Campbell | 71-65=136 | −6 |
| T9 | (United States) Jim Gallagher Jr. | 64-72=136 | −6 |
| T9 | (United States) Peter Jacobsen | 69-67=136 | −6 |
| T9 | (United States) Lee Janzen | 66-70=136 | −6 |
| T9 | (United States) Billy Mayfair | 68-68=136 | −6 |
| T9 | (United States) Jeff Sluman | 69-67=136 | −6 |

=== Third round ===
Saturday, August 12, 1995

| Place | Player | Score | To par |
|---|---|---|---|
| 1 | (South Africa) Ernie Els | 66-65-66=197 | −16 |
| T2 | (United States) Jeff Maggert | 66-69-65=200 | −13 |
| T2 | (United States) Mark O'Meara | 64-67-69=200 | −13 |
| 4 | (Scotland) Colin Montgomerie | 68-67-67=202 | −11 |
| T5 | (Australia) Steve Elkington | 68-67-68=203 | −10 |
| T5 | (United States) Craig Stadler | 71-66-66=203 | −10 |
| T7 | (United States) Jay Haas | 69-71-64=204 | −9 |
| T7 | (United States) Justin Leonard | 68-66-70=204 | −9 |
| T7 | (United States) Jeff Sluman | 69-67-68=204 | −9 |
| T10 | (United States) Bob Estes | 69-68-68=205 | −8 |
| T10 | (Spain) Miguel Ángel Jiménez | 69-69-67=205 | −8 |
| T10 | (United States) Steve Lowery | 69-68-68=205 | −8 |
| T10 | (Australia) Greg Norman | 66-69-70=205 | −8 |
| T10 | (United States) Duffy Waldorf | 69-69-67=205 | −8 |

=== Final round ===
Sunday, August 13, 1995

| Place | Player | Score | To par | Money ($) |
|---|---|---|---|---|
| T1 | (Australia) Steve Elkington | 68-67-68-64=267 | −17 | Playoff |
| T1 | (Scotland) Colin Montgomerie | 68-67-67-65=267 | −17 | Playoff |
| T3 | (South Africa) Ernie Els | 66-65-66-72=269 | −15 | 116,000 |
| T3 | (United States) Jeff Maggert | 66-69-65-69=269 | −15 | 116,000 |
| 5 | (United States) Brad Faxon | 70-67-71-63=271 | −13 | 80,000 |
| T6 | (United States) Bob Estes | 69-68-68-68=273 | −11 | 68,500 |
| T6 | (United States) Mark O'Meara | 64-67-69-73=273 | −11 | 68,500 |
| T8 | (United States) Jay Haas | 69-71-64-70=274 | −10 | 50,000 |
| T8 | (United States) Justin Leonard | 68-66-70-70=274 | −10 | 50,000 |
| T8 | (United States) Steve Lowery | 69-68-68-69=274 | −10 | 50,000 |
| T8 | (United States) Jeff Sluman | 69-67-68-70=274 | −10 | 50,000 |
| T8 | (United States) Craig Stadler | 71-66-66-71=274 | −10 | 50,000 |

=== Playoff ===
The sudden-death playoff began on the par-4 18th hole, where both drove into the fairway and reached the green in regulation. Elkington was away and birdied from twenty feet (6 m). Montgomerie was slightly closer, but missed his putt to extend the playoff.

| Place | Player | Score | To par | Money ($) |
|---|---|---|---|---|
| 1 | (Australia) Steve Elkington | 3 | −1 | 360,000 |
| 2 | (Scotland) Colin Montgomerie | 4 | E | 216,000 |
