= Willie Hunter (golfer) =

Scottish-American golfer

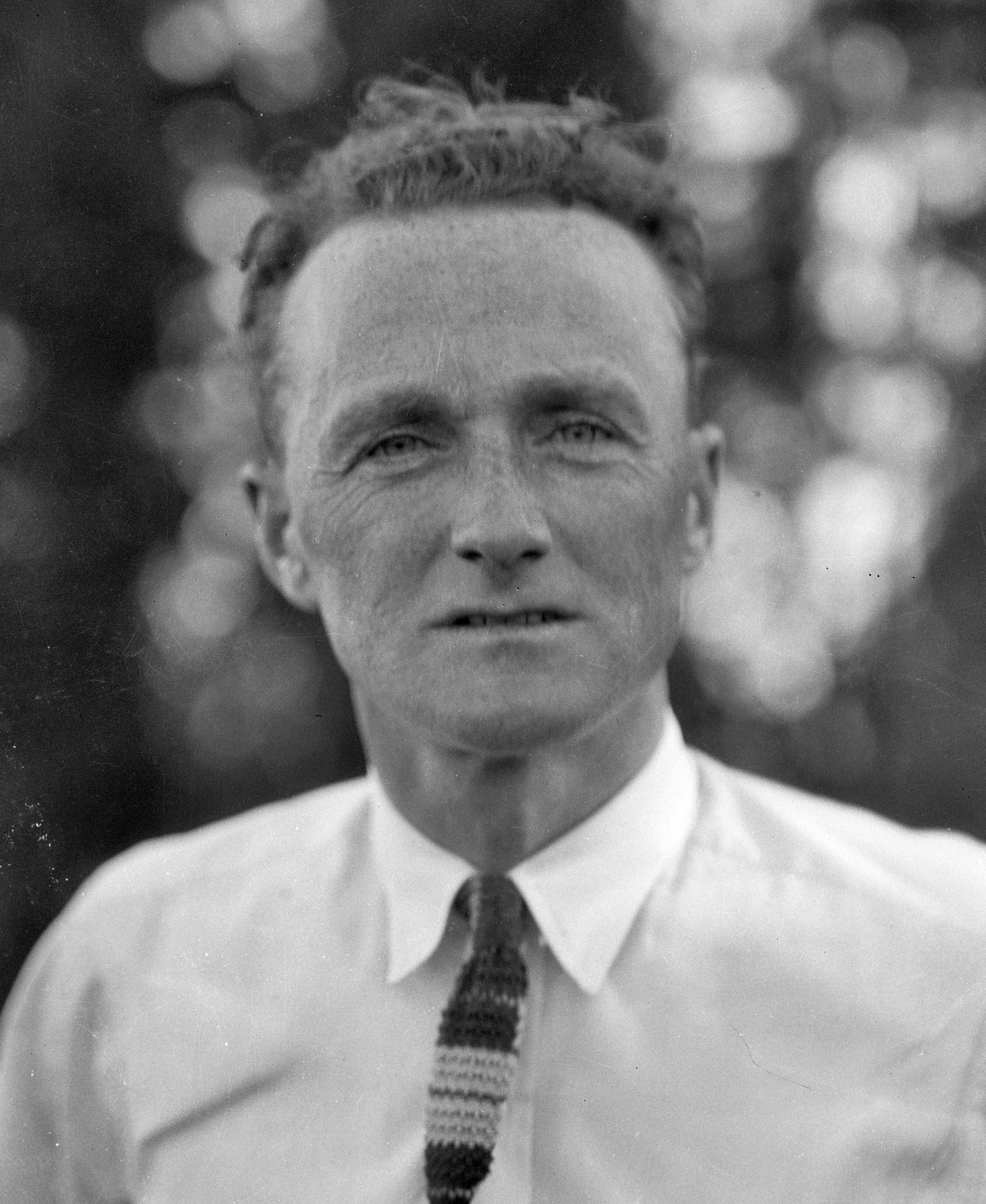
- Hunter in 1927

Personal information
- Full name: William Irvine Hunter
- Nickname: Wee Willie
- Nationality: Scotland; United States
- Born: January 29, 1892 Forest Row, England
- Died: October 18, 1968 (aged 76) Palm Springs, California, U.S.
- Height: 5 ft 8 in (1.73 m)
- Weight: 150 lb (68 kg; 11 st)

Career
- Sport: Golf
- Turned professional: 1923
- Former tour: PGA Tour
- Professional wins: 8

Number of wins by tour
- PGA Tour: 6
- Other: 2

Best results in major championships (wins: 1)
- Masters Tournament: DNP
- PGA Championship: T17: 1923
- U.S. Open: 8th: 1926
- The Open Championship: T17: 1931
- U.S. Amateur: T3: 1921
- British Amateur: Won: 1921

William Irvine Hunter (January 29, 1892 – October 18, 1968) was a Scottish golfer who played extensively in the United States. In 1921, Hunter won the British Amateur and immigrated to the United States later that year. He became a prominent figure in California golf, winning several important titles, including six PGA Tour events, but played the tour, such as it was at that time, only on an irregular basis, while holding down club jobs. He was the head professional at Riviera Country Club, near Los Angeles, California, from 1936 to 1964.

== Early life ==
Willie Hunter was the son of Harry (Henry) Hunter, golf professional and course superintendent at the Royal Cinque Ports Golf Club, located on the Strait of Dover in the town of Deal, Kent, England. Harry Hunter had been hired by that Club when it was founded in 1892, and in addition to his golf professional duties, assisted in laying out and maintaining the golf course, starting a 50-year association with the club.

Willie Hunter was born in Forest Row, East Sussex, England, but was "as Scotch as the heather at Troon." Early in his career, Hunter worked as a telegraph operator in Deal.

== Amateur career ==
In 1920, the year his home club hosted The Open Championship, Willie Hunter ended as the leading amateur in that event, and made it to the final eight (quarterfinal round) of the British Amateur, held at Muirfield. The next year, Hunter won that title, the oldest in amateur golf, at the Royal Liverpool Golf Club; this was considered a major championship at the time.

Hunter traveled to the United States later that same year, to contest the U.S. Amateur, being played at the St. Louis Country Club, near St. Louis, Missouri. An article heralding his America arrival in The New York Times noted his three-quarter swing, great skill with the mashie and putter, and composure during competition, all making up for his small physical stature. This was his second trip to the U.S.; he had played in the U.S. Open in 1920. Hunter defeated Bobby Jones during the 1921 U.S. Amateur, in the quarterfinal round, by 2 and 1 over the scheduled 36-hole match. Jones, just 19 years old at the time, would later become one of the all-time great players in golf history. Hunter lost the next day in the semifinals to former champion Robert A. Gardner. Hunter decided to stay in the U.S. this time, and settled in southern California. He was suspended by the United States Golf Association from playing in amateur tournaments, because of his association with a golf goods importing company; this was against the rules at the time, but would likely be legal today. He qualified, through regional qualifying, into the match play portion (top 64) of the 1922 PGA Championship, but lost in the first round to Frank Sprogell 3 and 1.

In early 1922, Hunter announced his intention of becoming an American citizen. He traveled extensively through the western U.S. and Canada, making connections and looking for the best job he could find. He took a job as club secretary at the Rancho Country Club, then just beginning as a private club, in Los Angeles, and during his early period in the area, frequently partnered with top-class amateur George Von Elm in interclub competition, representing Rancho. He may have assisted Max Behr in designing and building Rancho. Soon after being reinstated as an amateur by the USGA, Hunter won the 1923 Southern California Amateur title, and took a job as secretary of the newly formed Lakeside Golf Club, then being built on Toluca Lake in Hollywood, California. Hunter, playing his golf at the Brentwood Club at the time, played in the match which formally opened Lakeside in 1924, and likely assisted Max Behr with the design of the course, which is regarded by many as Behr's best design work.

== Professional career ==
In the 1923 PGA Championship, Hunter won his first-round match against Al Watrous 2 and 1, but lost in the second round to Johnny Farrell 4 and 3. By entering this event, he declared as a professional, and would retain this status for the rest of his career.

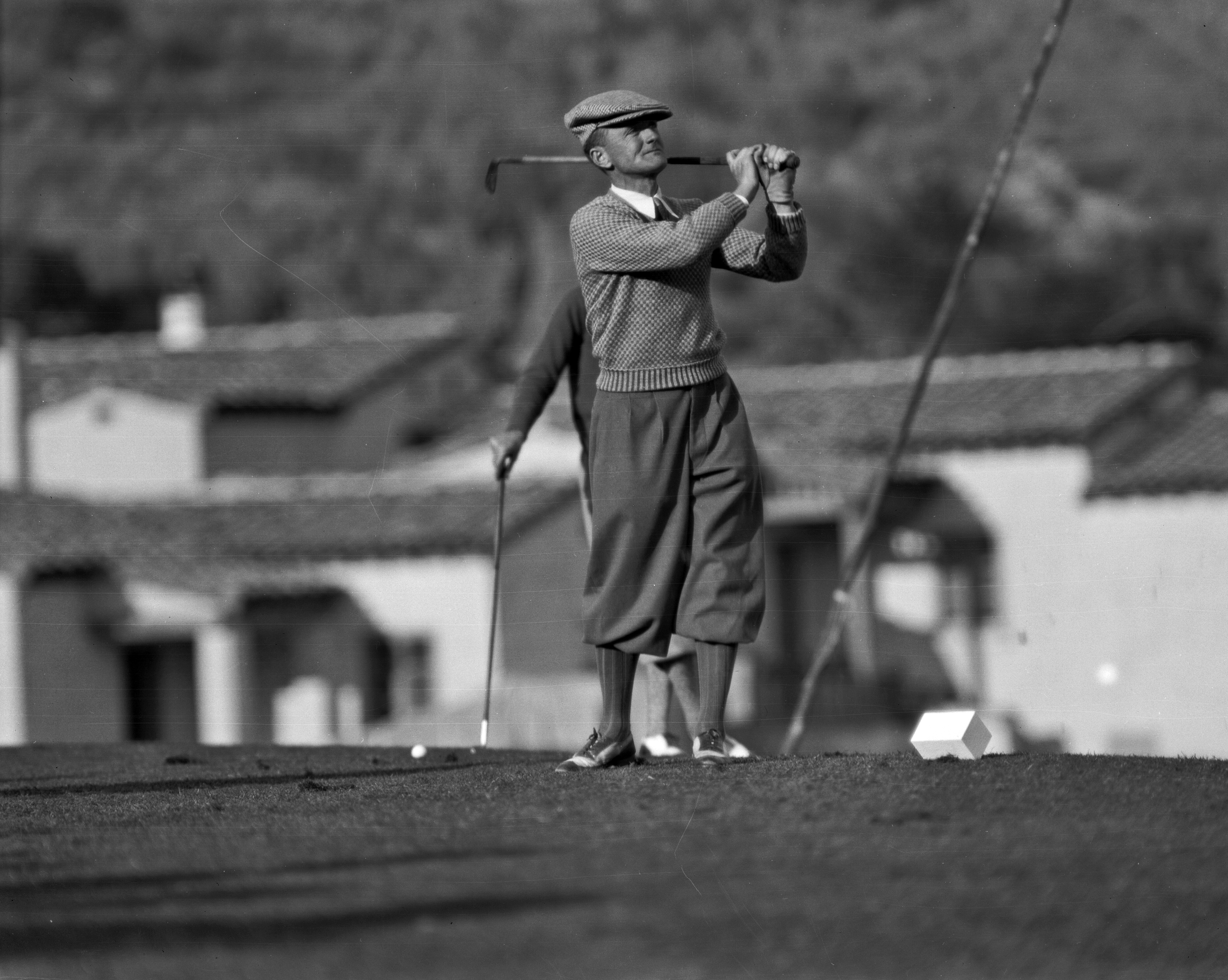
Hunter at a tournament in 1927

Hunter won six times on the PGA Tour. These included the California State Open in 1926 and 1927. In 1936 he won the Catalina Open, as well as the San Francisco Match Play, held at the golf club at the Presidio of San Francisco. He became the head professional at the elite Riviera Country Club, one of the world's top courses, in 1936, and held that position until 1964, when he retired. His son, Mac Hunter, then took over that job until 1973. Willie Hunter saved the Riviera course from severe flooding in 1939, and helped rescue the club from bankruptcy during World War II.

Hunter competed in 12 U.S. Opens between 1920 and 1938, making the 36-hole cut each time. He played in 1920, 1922, 1925–30, 1934–36, and 1938. His best finish, and only top-10 result, came in 1926 at Scioto Country Club, when he shot 75-77-69-79 for a 300 total, good for eighth place.

== Personal life ==
Hunter died on October 18, 1968, in Palm Springs, California.

== Awards and honors ==
Hunter was awarded an honorary membership by the Royal Cinque Ports Golf Club.

== Amateur wins ==
Note: This list may be incomplete.

- 1921 **British Amateur**
- 1923 Southern California Amateur

Major championship victories shown in bold.

== Professional wins ==
=== PGA Tour wins (6) ===
- 1926 (1) California State Open
- 1927 (1) California State Open
- 1928 (1) Southern California Open
- 1934 (1) Southern California Open
- 1936 (2) San Francisco National Match Play Open, Catalina Open

=== Other wins (2) ===
Note: This list may be incomplete.

- 1939 Southern California PGA Championship
- 1942 Southern California PGA Championship

== Major championships ==
=== Wins (1) ===
Year	Championship	Winning score	Runner-up
1921	The Amateur Championship	12 & 11	(England) Allan Graham

=== Results timeline ===
Tournament	1920	1921	1922	1923	1924	1925	1926	1927	1928	1929
U.S. Open			T24			T13	8	T44	T28	T23
The Open Championship	T26 LA		T23							
PGA Championship			R64	R32						
U.S. Amateur		SF	R16	R16	R32	–	–	–	–	–
The Amateur Championship	QF	**1**	SF		–	–	–	–	–	–

Tournament	1930	1931	1932	1933	1934	1935	1936	1937	1938	1939
U.S. Open	T17	CUT			T14	T28	T50	CUT	15	
The Open Championship		T17								
PGA Championship										

Tournament	1940	1941	1942	1943	1944	1945	1946	1947	1948	1949
U.S. Open			NT	NT	NT	NT			CUT	
The Open Championship	NT	NT	NT	NT	NT	NT				CUT
PGA Championship				NT						

Tournament	1950	1951	1952
U.S. Open	CUT		
The Open Championship			CUT
PGA Championship			

Note: Hunter never played in the Masters Tournament.

Win
Top 10
Did not play

LA = Low amateur
NT = no tournament
CUT = missed the half-way cut
R64, R32, R16, QF, SF = round in which player lost in PGA Championship match play
"T" indicates a tie for a place

- Sources: U.S. Open and U.S. Amateur, British Open, PGA Championship, 1920 British Amateur, 1921 British Amateur, 1922 British Amateur

== Team appearances ==
Amateur

- England–Scotland Amateur Match (representing Scotland): 1922 (winners)
