= 1948 U.S. Open (golf) =

Coordinates: 34.050°N 118.501°W

Tournament information
- Dates: June 10–12, 1948
- Location: Pacific Palisades, California
- Course: Riviera Country Club
- Organized by: USGA
- Tour: PGA Tour

Statistics
- Par: 71
- Length: 7,020 yards (6,419 m)
- Field: 171 players, 57 after cut
- Cut: 148 (+6)
- Prize fund: $10,000
- Winner's share: $2,000

Champion
- (United States) Ben Hogan
- 276 (−8)

Location in the United States
Location in California

The 1948 U.S. Open was the 48th U.S. Open, held June 10–12 at Riviera Country Club in the northwest Los Angeles district of Pacific Palisades, California. Ben Hogan won the first of his four U.S. Open titles at the course that became known as "Hogan's Alley," as it was his third win at Riviera in less than 18 months. He had won the Los Angeles Open at the course in early 1947 and 1948. It was the third of Hogan's nine major titles; he had won his second PGA Championship a few weeks earlier. He was only the second to win both titles in the same year, joining Gene Sarazen in 1922. Later winners of both were Jack Nicklaus in 1980 and Tiger Woods in 2000.

Although Sam Snead held the lead by a stroke after 36 holes with a record 138, Hogan dominated the final two rounds, shooting 68-69 on Saturday for a total of 276 (−8), two shots ahead of runner-up Jimmy Demaret. Hogan decimated the U.S. Open scoring record (281 by Ralph Guldahl in 1937) by five strokes, and his three rounds in the 60s was a tournament first. The scoring record stood for 19 years, until bested by a stroke by Jack Nicklaus in 1967. Hogan's 8-under-par set a U.S. Open record that stood until 2000, when it was broken by Tiger Woods (12-under, broken by Rory McIlroy in 2011 at 16-under).

Eight months later, Hogan and his wife were involved in a serious automobile accident, a head-on collision with a Greyhound bus in west Texas. The injuries he sustained prevented a defense of his title in 1949 while he recovered. Hogan returned to competition and won the U.S. Open in 1950, 1951, and 1953. (He led after 36 holes in 1952, but finished third.)

Ted Rhodes became the first African-American to play in the U.S. Open since 1913. He opened with 70, made the cut, and finished in 51st place.

This was the first U.S. Open played on the West Coast; the first in the western U.S. was a decade earlier, in 1938 near Denver. The first major played on the West Coast was the PGA Championship in 1929, played at Hillcrest Country Club in Los Angeles. At the time, the course at Riviera was the longest ever for a U.S. Open at 7,020 yards (6,419 m).

Babe Didrikson Zaharias became the first woman to attempt to qualify for the U.S. Open, but her application was rejected by the USGA. They stated that the event was intended to be open to men only.

== Course layout ==
Hole	1	2	3	4	5	6	7	8	9	Out	10	11	12	13	14	15	16	17	18	In	Total
Yards	513	466	415	245	432	166	402	385	422	3,446	315	569	445	440	180	440	145	585	455	3,574	7,020
Par	5	4	4	3	4	3	4	4	4	35	4	5	4	4	3	4	3	5	4	36	71

== Round summaries ==
=== First round ===
Thursday, June 10, 1948

Place	Player	Score	To par
T1	(United States) Ben Hogan	67	−4
T1	(United States) Lew Worsham	67	−4
T3	(United States) Ken Rogers (a)	69	−2
T3	(United States) Sam Snead	69	−2
T5	(South Africa) Bobby Locke	70	−1
T5	(United States) Toney Penna	70	−1
T5	(United States) Ted Rhodes	70	−1
T8	(United States) Skip Alexander	71	−1
T8	(United States) John Bass	71	−1
T8	(United States) Charles Congdon	71	−1
T8	(United States) John Dawson (a)	71	−1
T8	(United States) Jimmy Demaret	71	−1
T8	(Australia) Jim Ferrier	71	−1
T8	(United States) Leland Gibson	71	−1
T8	(United States) Herman Keiser	71	−1
T8	(United States) Dave Killen	71	−1
T8	(United States) Lloyd Mangrum	71	−1
T8	(United States) Andrew Mills	71	−1
T8	(United States) Jim Turnesa	71	−1
T8	(United States) Marvin Ward (a)	71	−1
T8	(United States) Gene Webb	71	−1
T8	(United States) Al Zimmerman	71	−1

=== Second round ===
Friday, June 11, 1948

Place	Player	Score	To par
1	(United States) Sam Snead	69-69=138	−4
T2	(United States) Ben Hogan	67-72=139	−3
T2	(South Africa) Bobby Locke	70-69=139	−3
4	(United States) Jim Turnesa	71-69=140	−2
T5	(United States) Charles Congdon	71-70=141	−1
T5	(United States) Jimmy Demaret	71-70=141	−1
T5	(United States) George Schneiter	73-68=141	−1
T5	(United States) Frank Stranahan (a)	72-69=141	−1
T5	(United States) Lew Worsham	67-74=141	−1
T10	(United States) Herman Keiser	71-71=142	E
T10	(United States) Joe Kirkwood, Jr.	72-70=142	E
T10	(United States) Toney Penna	70-72=142	E

=== Third round ===
Saturday, June 12, 1948 (morning)

Place	Player	Score	To par
1	(United States) Ben Hogan	67-72-68=207	−6
2	(United States) Jimmy Demaret	71-70-68=209	−4
3	(United States) Jim Turnesa	71-69-70=210	−3
4	(United States) Sam Snead	69-69-73=211	−2
T5	(United States) Charles Congdon	71-70-71=212	−1
T5	(South Africa) Bobby Locke	70-69-73=212	−1
T5	(United States) Jug McSpaden	74-69-69=212	−1
T5	(United States) Lew Worsham	67-74-71=212	−1
9	(United States) Smiley Quick	73-71-69=213	E
T10	(United States) Herman Barron	73-70-71=214	+1
T10	(United States) Joe Kirkwood, Jr.	72-70-72=214	+1

=== Final round ===
Saturday, June 12, 1948 (afternoon)

Place	Player	Score	To par	Money ($)
1	(United States) Ben Hogan	67-72-68-69=276	−8	2,000
2	(United States) Jimmy Demaret	71-70-68-69=278	−6	1,500
3	(United States) Jim Turnesa	71-69-70-70=280	−4	1,000
4	(South Africa) Bobby Locke	70-69-73-70=282	−2	800
5	(United States) Sam Snead	69-69-73-72=283	−1	600
6	(United States) Lew Worsham	67-74-71-73=285	+1	500
7	(United States) Herman Barron	73-70-71-72=286	+2	400
T8	(United States) Johnny Bulla	73-72-75-67=287	+3	300
T8	(United States) Toney Penna	70-72-73-72=287	+3	300
T8	(United States) Smiley Quick	73-71-69-74=287	+3	300
