= Hillcrest Country Club (Los Angeles) =

Country club in Los Angeles, California, United States

Coordinates: 34.051°N 118.407°W

- Hillcrest Country Club (the United States)
- Interactive map of Hillcrest Country Club

Club information
- Location: Los Angeles, California
- Established: 1920
- Type: Private
- Tota holes: 18
- Tournaments: PGA Championship (1929); Los Angeles Open (1932, 1942)
- Website: Hillcrest Country Club
- Designed by: Willie Watson
- Length: 6,489
- Slope rating: 136

Hillcrest Country Club is a private country club located on the west side of Los Angeles, California. Founded in 1920, it is a historically Jewish country club and was established at a time when Jewish members were excluded from other elite social clubs in the city.

== History ==
Located in Los Angeles's Cheviot Hills neighborhood, Hillcrest was founded by Samuel Newmark, Louis Issacs, Karl Triest, and Joseph Y. Baruh, and opened in 1920 as the first country club for the city's Jewish community.

In 1972, the Los Angeles Times referred to Hillcrest as "the leading Jewish country club in Southern California." The property includes tennis courts, an Olympic-size swimming pool, and an 18-hole golf course, as well as a clubhouse with dining and meeting facilities for its members and their guests. The golf course, originally designed by Willie Watson, was redesigned and renovated by renowned architect Kyle Phillips in 2019.

In the 1950s, oil was discovered on Hillcrest's land, and the club decided to permit drilling. Members who had shares in the club collect tax-sheltered dividends on their original initiation fees, and "B.O." (for "before oil") memberships became so valuable that they were willed from father to son.

Hillcrest was the site of the PGA Championship in 1929, one of golf's major tournaments. The championship was a match play competition and held in December 1929. It was won by defending champion Leo Diegel. It had the distinction of being the first major tournament held in the western United States. Hillcrest later hosted the Los Angeles Open on the PGA Tour in 1932 and 1942, won by Macdonald Smith and Ben Hogan, respectively.

From the back tees in 2013 the course rating was 73.1, with a slope rating of 136.

Doug Emhoff, husband of Vice President Kamala Harris and the first Jewish spouse of a Vice President, is a member at Hillcrest Country Club where he is known to avidly play golf.

== Early years ==
Hillcrest was established in the early days of the movie industry in Hollywood, when Jews were not permitted to join non-Jewish country clubs. In An Empire of Their Own, Neal Gabler described charity dinners of the 1930s at the all-Jewish club, where movie moguls would gather and outbid one-another with gifts to the United Jewish Welfare Fund and other Jewish causes.

In the 1940s, Hillcrest attracted many of Hollywood's biggest stars, including Milton Berle, Jack Benny, Danny Kaye, the Marx Brothers, George Burns, George Jessel, Al Jolson, Eddie Cantor and the Ritz Brothers. According to various accounts, MGM mogul Louis B. Mayer reportedly punched producer Sam Goldwyn in the nose while they were either in the showers or the steam room at Hillcrest.

In his 1995 book on the William Morris Agency, author Frank Rose described Hillcrest as being:

...as close to invisible as 142 acres (0.57 km^{2}) on the south side of Beverly Hills could be. No sign, just a number on the stone entrance gates...Ever since the Depression, this had been the preserve of Hollywood's elite. All the great moguls had belonged to Hillcrest—Louis B. Mayer and the Warner brothers and Harry Cohn of Columbia and Adolph Zukor of Paramount.

== Notable Jewish members ==
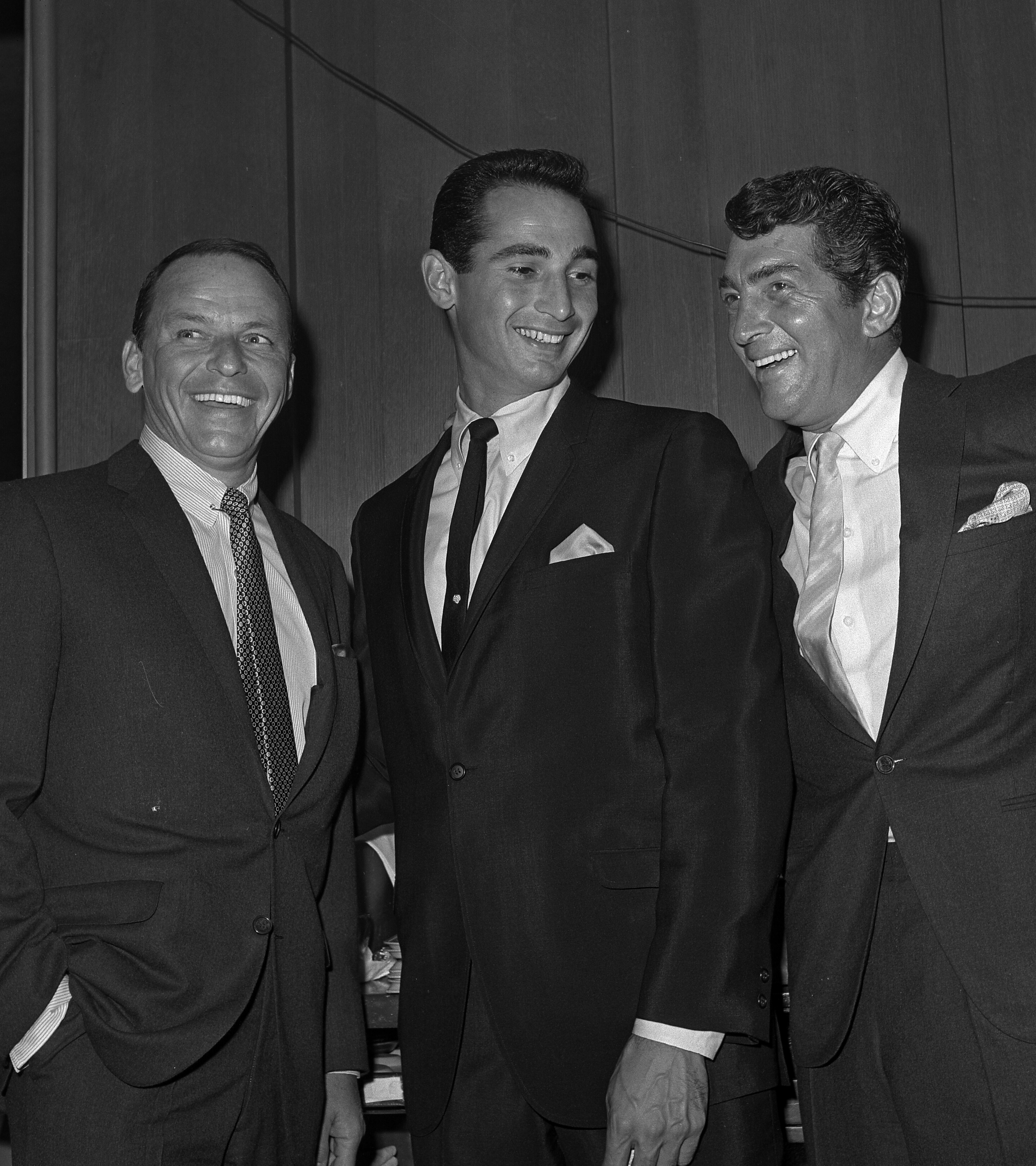
Left to right: Frank Sinatra, Sandy Koufax, and Dean Martin at Hillcrest Country Club, December 1963

Sandy Koufax, star pitcher of the Los Angeles Dodgers, was a member of the club. In December 1963, he was roasted at Hillcrest by Jewish comedians who were members of the club, along with guest roasters Frank Sinatra and Dean Martin. In what the Los Angeles Times called just about the only printable comment of the evening, George Jessel called Koufax, "without question, the most important Hebrew athlete since Samson."

Singer and actress Dinah Shore, an avid golfer and later inductee of the World Golf Hall of Fame, was the first female member of Hillcrest.

=== The "Round Table" ===
For years, many of Hollywood's top comedians, including Jack Benny, George Burns, George Jessel, the Marx Brothers, Danny Kaye, and later Milton Berle, Sid Caesar and Don Rickles, got together for a regular Friday lunch at Hillcrest, where they would socialize, try new material out on their friends, and talk "shop." Alan King said the Friday lunches at Hillcrest were like a college for comedy. In 1972, the Los Angeles Times referred to the comedians' table at Hillcrest as the "Round Table" in a corner of the main dining room. Other members of the Round Table included the Ritz Brothers, Al Jolson, Harpo Marx, Eddie Cantor, Lou Holtz and Irving Brecher.

Comedian David Steinberg noted that Hillcrest "is a little like an inverted New York Athletic Club: there is no discrimination, but it sure helps if you're Jewish and a comedian." Milton Berle, a long-time member, described Hillcrest—known for its food—as "a dining club with golf."

Groucho Marx was a member of Hillcrest, even though he once famously proclaimed that he would not want to be a member of any club willing to have him as a member. He once noted: "As you may recall, the Hillcrest is the only country club in all of Greater Los Angeles that will accept Talmudic scholars such as myself as members." Ultimately, Groucho considered his Hillcrest membership precious enough to pass on to his son in his will.

Groucho's son Arthur wrote,

In the heyday of the Round Table, in the '40s, '50s and '60s, it was probably the most amusing place to lunch in all the world. Imagine sitting at a table with that group, each one trying to out-funny the other, and all but Harpo, Chico and Danny Kaye puffing on long, fragrant Havanas. If you didn't die laughing, you could have choked on the smoke."

Hillcrest was George Burns' home away from home, as he regularly held court there with his fellow comedians and friends. He was one of the first in the group to join; his original membership fee was $300. Unless he was out of town, he showed up every day from noon to 3 p.m. for his bridge game. At the time of his death in 1996, one of Burns' friends recalled: "The last time I saw George was two days before his death, when he arrived in a wheelchair for his bridge game."

When he died in 2002, Milton Berle had been a Hillcrest member for 70 years. In a 1994 interview with Cigar Aficionado, Berle recalled joining Hillcrest in 1932: "It cost me $275 to join in those days. Now the initiation fee is $150,000, if they'll accept you, which all depends on how much money you've given to the United Jewish Appeal."

== Admission of non-Jews ==
When Hillcrest membership opened to non-Jews, their first choice for a new member was Danny Thomas, a Lebanese Catholic. At the time, Jack Benny quipped to Thomas that the least the club could have done was to admit a member who looked like a gentile.

Other notable non-Jewish members over the years have included: Frank Sinatra, Los Angeles Dodgers owner Walter O'Malley, actor Jack Lemmon, Sidney Poitier, and Oscar-winning film producers Darryl F. and Richard D. Zanuck.

== See also ==
- Jewish country club
- History of the Jews in Los Angeles
