= Tyler Duncan =

American professional golfer (born 1989)

Personal information
- Full name: Tyler Reed Duncan
- Nationality: United States
- Born: July 13, 1989 (age 37) Columbus, Indiana, U.S.
- Height: 5 ft 8 in (1.73 m)
- Weight: 150 lb (68 kg; 11 st)
- Spouse: Maria

Career
- Sport: Golf
- College: Purdue University
- Turned professional: 2012
- Current tour: PGA Tour
- Former tours: Web.com Tour; PGA Tour Latinoamérica
- Professional wins: 1

Number of wins by tour
- PGA Tour: 1

Best results in major championships
- Masters Tournament: CUT: 2020
- PGA Championship: CUT: 2020
- U.S. Open: T34: 2020
- The Open Championship: DNP

Tyler Reed Duncan (born July 13, 1989) is an American professional golfer.

== Amateur career ==
Duncan played his college golf for the Purdue Boilermakers.

== Professional career ==
Duncan played on the PGA Tour Latinoamérica in 2014 where his best finish was T-6 at the Lexus Panama Classic. In December 2014, Duncan finished in the top 45 at the Web.com Tour Qualifying Tournament earning his Web.com Tour card for 2015. He played on the Web.com Tour from 2015 to 2017. His best finish on the Web.com Tour was T-2 at the 2015 Brasil Champions and T-2 at the 2017 BMW Charity Pro-Am.

In 2017, he finished T-11 in the Web.com Tour Finals to earn his PGA Tour card for the 2017–18 season.

In November 2019, Duncan won the RSM Classic in a playoff over Webb Simpson. It was Duncan's first win in a multiple-day event since the 2011 Indiana Amateur. He did not win while playing college golf at Purdue and did not win at any level in professional golf. His win included his lowest round on tour, a second round 61.

== Personal ==
Duncan's uncle, Andrew Johnson, is his swing coach. Johnson won the 2005 Cleveland Open on the Nationwide Tour.

== Professional wins (1) ==
=== PGA Tour wins (1) ===
No.	Date	Tournament	Winning score	To par	Margin of victory	Runner-up
1	Nov 24, 2019	RSM Classic	67-61-70-65=263	−19	Playoff	(United States) Webb Simpson

PGA Tour playoff record (1–0)

No.	Year	Tournament	Opponent	Result
1	2019	RSM Classic	(United States) Webb Simpson	Won with birdie on second extra hole

== Results in major championships ==
Results not in chronological order in 2020.

Tournament	2015	2016	2017	2018
Masters Tournament				
U.S. Open	CUT			T56
The Open Championship				
PGA Championship				

Tournament	2019	2020
Masters Tournament		CUT
PGA Championship		CUT
U.S. Open		T34
The Open Championship		NT

Did not play

CUT = missed the half-way cut
"T" = tied
NT = no tournament due to COVID-19 pandemic

== Results in The Players Championship ==
Tournament	2019	2020	2021	2022	2023	2024
The Players Championship	T74	C	CUT		T54	T64

CUT = missed the halfway cut
"T" indicates a tie for a place
C = Canceled after the first round due to the COVID-19 pandemic

== Results in World Golf Championships ==
Tournament	2020
Championship	
Match Play	NT^{1}
Invitational	T49
Champions	NT^{1}

^{1}Cancelled due to COVID-19 pandemic

Did not play

NT = No tournament

== See also ==
- 2017 Web.com Tour Finals graduates
- 2019 Korn Ferry Tour Finals graduates
