= Monterey Peninsula Classic =

Golf tournament

Tournament information
- Location: Seaside, California, U.S.
- Established: 2000
- Courses: Bayonet and Black Horse
- Par: 72
- Length: 7,084 yards (6,478 m)
- Tour: Nationwide Tour
- Format: Stroke play
- Prize fund: $450,000
- Month played: October
- Final year: 2003

Tournament record score
- Aggregate: 276 Scott Gutschewski (2003)
- To par: −12 as above

Final champion
- (United States) Scott Gutschewski

Location map
- Location in the United States Location in California

The Monterey Peninsula Classic was a golf tournament on the Nationwide Tour from 2000 to 2003. It was played in Seaside, California at the Bayonet and Black Horse courses, formerly part of Fort Ord.

The purse each year was $450,000, with $81,000 going to the winner.

== Winners ==
Year	Winner	Score	To par	Margin of victory	Runner(s)-up
Monterey Peninsula Classic
2003	(United States) Scott Gutschewski	276	−12	4 strokes	(United States) Michael Allen (United States) Rich Barcelo (United States) Zach Johnson
Bank of America Monterey Peninsula Classic
2002	(United States) Roland Thatcher	283	−5	2 strokes	(Australia) Aaron Baddeley
Buy.com Monterey Peninsula Classic
2001	(United States) Chad Campbell	280	−8	1 stroke	(South Africa) Deane Pappas
2000	(Wales) Richard Johnson	285	−3	1 stroke	(United States) Michael Allen
