= Sports in Arizona =

Sports in Arizona includes professional sports teams, college sports, and individual sports.

== Major professional sports league teams ==
Professional sports teams in Arizona include three major league teams

Club	Sport	League	Founded	Championships
Arizona Diamondbacks	Baseball	Major League Baseball	1998	1 (2001)
Phoenix Suns	Basketball	National Basketball Association	1968	0
Arizona Cardinals	American football	National Football League	1898	2 (1925, 1947)

== Other professional sports teams ==
Other professional sports teams in Arizona include minor league and semi-pro teams:

Club	Sport	League	Founded	Championships
Phoenix Rising FC	Soccer	USL Championship	2014	1 (2023)
Tucson Roadrunners	Ice hockey	American Hockey League	2016	0
Phoenix Mercury	Basketball	Women's National Basketball Association	1997	3 (2007, 2009, 2014)
Tucson Saguaros	Baseball	Pecos League	2016	4 (2016, 2020, 2021, 2025)
Arizona Rattlers	Indoor football	Indoor Football League	1992	7 (1994, 1997, 2012, 2013, 2014, 2017, 2024)
Northern Arizona Wranglers	Indoor football	Indoor Football League	2021	1 (2022)
Tucson Sugar Skulls	Indoor football	Indoor Football League	2019	0
Arizona Sidewinders	Ultimate (sport)	Western Ultimate League	2020	0
FC Tucson	Soccer	USL League Two	2010	0
Coronado AC	Soccer	United Premier Soccer League	2015	0

== College sports ==
With three state universities and one private university in NCAA Division I, and several community colleges, college sports are also prevalent in Arizona. The intense rivalry between Arizona State University and the University of Arizona predates Arizona's statehood, and is one of the oldest rivalries in the NCAA. The thus aptly named Territorial Cup, first awarded in 1889 and certified as the oldest trophy in college football, is awarded to the winner of the "Duel in the Desert", the annual football game between the two schools. Both UA and ASU are members of the Pac-12 Conference, one of the so-called Power Five conferences in Division I FBS, the top tier of U.S. college football.

The other two Division I members in Arizona are Northern Arizona University in Flagstaff, which plays football in the second-level Division I FCS, and Grand Canyon University in Phoenix, a private school that does not sponsor football. All four universities do have and support and have numerous men's and women's athletic teams and individual sports at the top Division 1 NCAA level, including: baseball, softball, basketball, soccer, and track & field to name a few.

Arizona also hosts several college football bowl games. The Fiesta Bowl, originally held at Sun Devil Stadium, is now held at State Farm Stadium in Glendale. The Fiesta Bowl has been part of the College Football Playoff (CFP) since its creation for the 2014 season, and is paired with the Peach Bowl in Atlanta as rotating hosts of CFP semifinals. The Fiesta Bowl hosted a CFP semifinal in 2016, and will next host a semifinal in the 2019 season. University of Phoenix Stadium was also home to the 2007 and 2011 BCS National Championship Games and hosted Super Bowl XLII on February 3, 2008. It hosted the state's first Pro Bowl on January 25, 2015, Super Bowl XLIX on February 1, 2015, and the College Football Playoff National Championship on January 11, 2016. The stadium also hosted the Final Four of the 2017 NCAA Division I men's basketball tournament and 2024 NCAA Division I men's basketball tournament. The Cactus Bowl is currently played in Phoenix at Chase Field. It was first held at Arizona Stadium at the UA campus in Tucson, then moved to Chase Field when it was known as Bank One Ballpark, and then to Sun Devil Stadium before returning to Chase Field in 2015.

== Individual sports ==
Due to its numerous golf courses, Arizona is home to several stops on the PGA Tour, most notably the Phoenix Open, held at the TPC of Scottsdale, and the WGC-Accenture Match Play Championship at the Ritz-Carlton Golf Club in Marana. The LPGA Tour's Ford Championship is held at Whirlwind Golf Club in Chandler. The lower-level Cactus Tour, for women golfers, is mostly in Arizona.

Auto racing is another sport known in the state. Phoenix International Raceway in Avondale is home to NASCAR race weekends twice a year. Firebird International Raceway near Chandler is home to drag racing, off-road racing and other motorsport events.

== Baseball ==
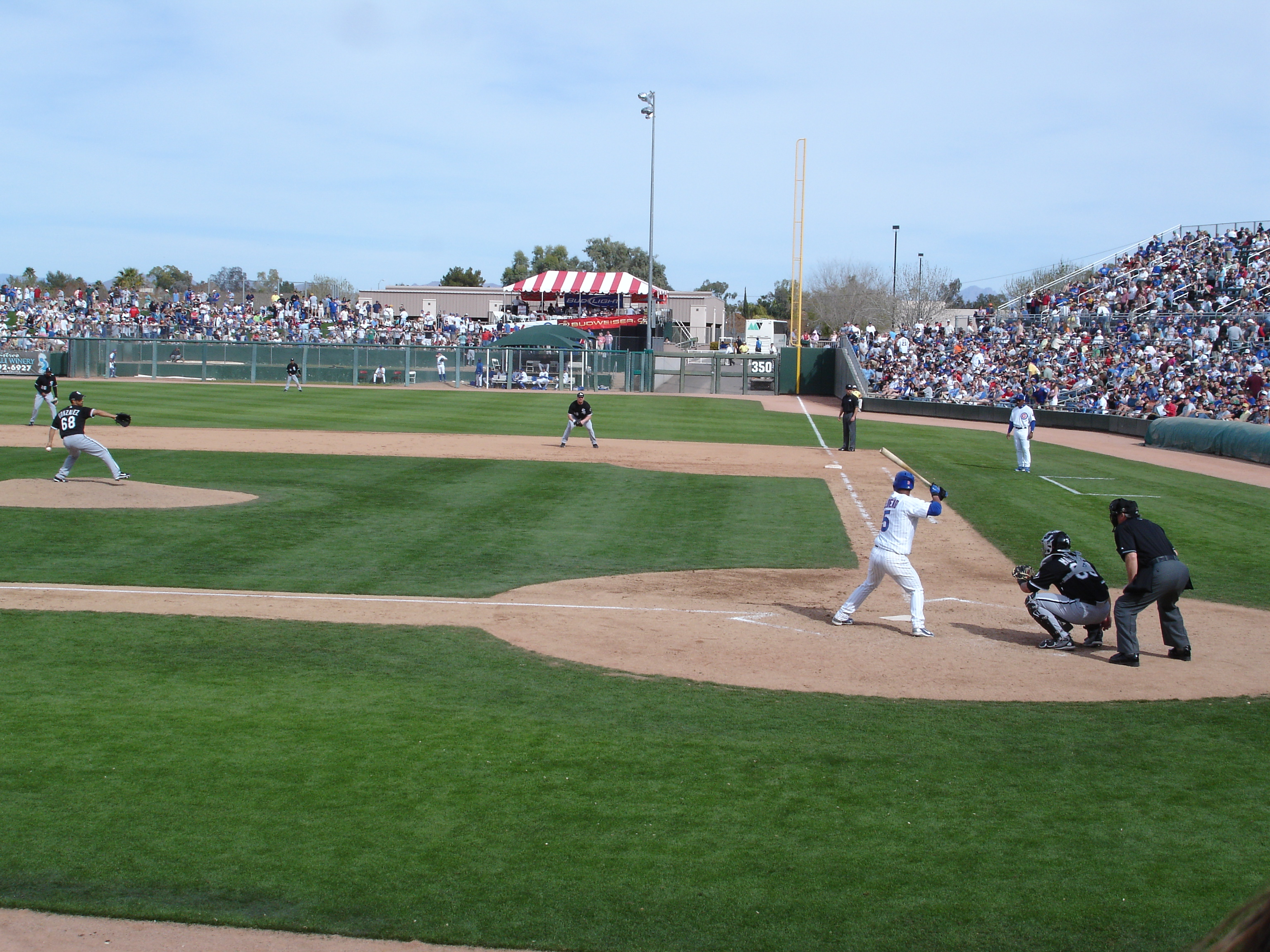
A spring training game between the two Chicago teams, the Cubs and the White Sox, at HoHoKam Park in Mesa.

Arizona is a popular location for Major League Baseball spring training, as it is the site of the Cactus League. The only other location for spring training is in Florida with the Grapefruit League. In 2009, the Los Angeles Dodgers opened a new spring training facility in Phoenix owned by Glendale, making them the 14th team in Arizona. Spring training has been somewhat of a tradition in Arizona since 1947 (i.e. the Cleveland Indians in Tucson until 1991, and the San Diego Padres in Yuma until 1992) despite the fact that the state did not have its own major league team until the state was awarded the Diamondbacks in Phoenix as an expansion team. The state currently hosts the following teams for spring training:

- Arizona Diamondbacks at Salt River Fields
- Chicago Cubs at Sloan Park in Mesa
- Chicago White Sox at Camelback Ranch-Glendale in Phoenix
- Cincinnati Reds at Goodyear Ballpark
- Cleveland Guardians at Goodyear Ballpark
- Colorado Rockies at Salt River Fields
- Kansas City Royals at Surprise Stadium
- Los Angeles Angels of Anaheim at Tempe Diablo Stadium.
- Los Angeles Dodgers at Camelback Ranch-Glendale in Phoenix
- Milwaukee Brewers at Maryvale Baseball Park in Phoenix
- Oakland Athletics at Hohokam Stadium in Mesa
- San Diego Padres at Peoria Sports Complex
- San Francisco Giants at Scottsdale Stadium, but also in Papago Park of Phoenix
- Seattle Mariners at Peoria Sports Complex, but also in Chandler
- Texas Rangers at Surprise Stadium

Besides being home to MLB spring training, Arizona is also home to the Arizona Fall League. The Fall League was founded in 1992 and is a minor league baseball league designed for players to refine their skills and perform in game settings in front of major and minor league baseball scouts and team executives, who are in attendance at almost every game. The league got exposure when Michael Jordan started his time in baseball with the Scottsdale Scorpions.

Arizona is also the home of the Arizona Diamondbacks, a professional baseball team based in Phoenix and founded in 1998 as an expansion team in the National League's West Division of the MLB. They play their home games at Chase Field. They became the fastest expansion team to win a World Series title (four seasons) when they beat three-time defending champ the New York Yankees in 2001.

== Basketball ==
The Phoenix Suns play in the National Basketball Association's Pacific Division and are the only team not from California in that division. They are also the only men's professional sports team left that does not brand itself as an Arizona team, only from the city of Phoenix. They were founded in 1968 and play their home games at Mortgage Matchup Center. They have appeared in three NBA Finals, but have yet to win a championship.

The Phoenix Mercury are a professional Women's National Basketball Association team based in Phoenix. They play their home games at Mortgage Matchup Center as well. They were founded in 1997 as one of the league's inaugural teams. They play in the Pacific Division of the WNBA. They have won three WNBA titles.

== Professional football ==
The Arizona Cardinals are a professional National Football League team based in Phoenix. They were founded in 1898 in Chicago, Illinois. They currently play at State Farm Stadium. They have never won a Super Bowl, losing in their only appearance in Super Bowl XLIII at the conclusion of the 2008-09 season. They play in the National Football Conference's West Division.

In addition to games involving the Cardinals, four Super Bowls have been hosted in Arizona:

- Super Bowl XXX (1996)
- Super Bowl XLII (2008)
- Super Bowl XLIX (2015)
- Super Bowl LVII (2023)

== Ice hockey ==
The Arizona Coyotes are an inactive professional National Hockey League team formerly based in Glendale. They played their home games at Gila River Arena. They have never played in a Stanley Cup Final. They moved to Arizona in 1996 from Winnipeg, Manitoba before deactivating in 2024, transferring their entire roster and staff to the Utah Mammoth. They played in NHL's Central Division.
