= 2015 Champions Tour =

Golf tour season

2015 Champions Tour season
- Duration: January 23, 2015 – November 8, 2015
- Number of official events: 24 (Note: A further two tournaments were scheduled but were canceled.)
- Most wins: (United States) Jeff Maggert (4)
- Charles Schwab Cup: (Germany) Bernhard Langer
- Money list: (Germany) Bernhard Langer
- Player of the Year: (Germany) Bernhard Langer
- Rookie of the Year: (United States) Jerry Smith

The 2015 Champions Tour was the 36th season of the Champions Tour (formerly the Senior PGA Tour), the main professional golf tour in the United States for men aged 50 and over.

== Schedule ==
The following table lists official events during the 2015 season.

Date	Tournament	Location	Purse (US$)	Winner (Note: The number in parentheses after each winner's name is the number of Champions Tour events they had won up to and including that tournament. This information is only shown for Champions Tour members.)	Notes
Jan 25	Mitsubishi Electric Championship at Hualalai	Hawaii	1,800,000	(Spain) Miguel Ángel Jiménez (2)	
Feb 8	Allianz Championship	Florida	1,700,000	(United States) Paul Goydos (2)	
Feb 15	ACE Group Classic	Florida	1,600,000	(United States) Lee Janzen (1)	
Mar 22	Tucson Conquistadores Classic	Arizona	1,700,000	(United States) Marco Dawson (1)	New tournament
Mar 29	Mississippi Gulf Resort Classic	Mississippi	1,600,000	(South Africa) David Frost (6)	
Apr 19	Greater Gwinnett Championship	Georgia	1,800,000	(United States) Olin Browne (2)	
Apr 26	Bass Pro Shops Legends of Golf	Missouri	2,800,000	(United States) Billy Andrade (1) and (United States) Joe Durant (1)	Team event
May 3	Insperity Invitational	Texas	2,050,000	(Wales) Ian Woosnam (1)	
May 17	Regions Tradition	Alabama	2,300,000	(United States) Jeff Maggert (2)	Champions Tour major championship
May 24	Senior PGA Championship	Indiana	2,750,000	(Scotland) Colin Montgomerie (3)	Senior major championship
Jun 7	Principal Charity Classic	Iowa	1,750,000	(United States) Mark Calcavecchia (3)	
Jun 14	Constellation Senior Players Championship	Massachusetts	2,700,000	(Germany) Bernhard Langer (24)	Champions Tour major championship
Jun 28	U.S. Senior Open	California	3,750,000	(United States) Jeff Maggert (3)	Senior major championship
Jul 12	Encompass Championship	Illinois	1,900,000	(United States) Jerry Smith (1)	
Jul 26	The Senior Open Championship	England	£1,300,000	(United States) Marco Dawson (2)	Senior major championship
Aug 2	3M Championship	Minnesota	1,750,000	(United States) Kenny Perry (8)	
Aug 9	Shaw Charity Classic	Canada	2,350,000	(United States) Jeff Maggert (4)	
Aug 23	Boeing Classic	Washington	2,000,000	(United States) Billy Andrade (2)	
Aug 30	Dick's Sporting Goods Open	New York	1,900,000	(United States) Jeff Maggert (5)	
~~Sep 6~~	Quebec Championship	Canada	–	Canceled	
~~Sep 20~~	Pacific Links China Championship	China	–	Canceled	
Sep 27	Nature Valley First Tee Open at Pebble Beach	California	2,000,000	(Mexico) Esteban Toledo (3)	
Oct 11	SAS Championship	North Carolina	2,100,000	(United States) Tom Lehman (9)	
Oct 18	San Antonio Championship	Texas	1,800,000	(Germany) Bernhard Langer (25)	
Nov 1	Toshiba Classic	California	1,800,000	(United States) Duffy Waldorf (1)	
Nov 8	Charles Schwab Cup Championship	Arizona	2,500,000	(United States) Billy Andrade (3)	Tour Championship

=== Unofficial events ===
The following events were sanctioned by the Champions Tour, but did not carry official money, nor were wins official.

Date	Tournament	Location	Purse ($)	Winners	Notes
Dec 13	PNC Father-Son Challenge	Florida	1,085,000	(United States) Lanny Wadkins and son Tucker Wadkins	Team event

== Charles Schwab Cup ==
The Charles Schwab Cup was based on tournament results during the season, calculated using a points-based system.

Position	Player	Points
1	(Germany) Bernhard Langer	3,520
2	(Scotland) Colin Montgomerie	3,182
3	(United States) Jeff Maggert	3,143
4	(United States) Billy Andrade	1,951
5	(United States) Joe Durant	1,466

== Money list ==
The money list was based on prize money won during the season, calculated in U.S. dollars.

Position	Player	Prize money ($)
1	(Germany) Bernhard Langer	2,340,288
2	(United States) Jeff Maggert	2,240,836
3	(Scotland) Colin Montgomerie	2,069,619
4	(United States) Billy Andrade	1,533,919
5	(United States) Joe Durant	1,445,956

== Awards ==
Award	Winner	Ref.
Player of the Year (Jack Nicklaus Trophy)	(Germany) Bernhard Langer	
Rookie of the Year	(United States) Jerry Smith	
Scoring leader (Byron Nelson Award)	(Germany) Bernhard Langer	
