= Chris Baryla =

Canadian professional golfer

Personal information
- Full name: Christopher Baryla
- Nationality: Canada
- Born: October 24, 1982 (age 44) Calgary, Alberta, Canada
- Height: 6 ft 0 in (1.83 m)
- Weight: 180 lb (82 kg; 13 st)

Career
- Sport: Golf
- College: UTEP
- Turned professional: 2004
- Former tours: Web.com Tour; PGA Tour
- Professional wins: 1

Number of wins by tour
- Korn Ferry Tour: 1

Best results in major championships
- Masters Tournament: DNP
- PGA Championship: DNP
- U.S. Open: CUT: 2003
- The Open Championship: DNP

Christopher Baryla (born October 24, 1982) is a Canadian professional golfer who has played on the Web.com Tour and the PGA Tour.

== Early life and amateur career ==
Baryla was born in Calgary. He graduated from the University of Texas at El Paso, and turned pro in 2004.

== Professional career ==
Baryla won his first Nationwide Tour event and first professional event at the 2009 Chattanooga Classic, winning in dramatic fashion. He led by two strokes going into the final round, and started bogey, bogey. But he rallied, making seven birdies after the poor start, and ended up with a one stroke victory over Troy Kelly. He finished 19th on the money list to earn his 2010 PGA Tour card. Before this win, his best finish on the Nationwide Tour was a runner-up finish, in the 2007 Henrico County Open.

Baryla's 2010 season ended after just seven events (two cuts) due to hip problems and surgery on a torn labrum. He was to begin 2011 on a medical exemption which will give him fifteen events to keep his PGA Tour card by earning the equivalent of Troy Merritt's winnings, the golfer who finished 125th on the Tour's money list in 2010. His status increased after he finished inside the Top 25 during the Tour's Qualifying School and secured a Tour Card, where he only made one cut in 20 attempts.

== Professional wins (1) ==
=== Nationwide Tour wins (1) ===
| No. | Date | Tournament | Winning score | Margin of victory | Runner-up |
|---|---|---|---|---|---|
| 1 | Oct 11, 2009 | Chattanooga Classic | −19 (66-68-65-70=269) | 1 stroke | (United States) Troy Kelly |

Nationwide Tour playoff record (0–1)

| No. | Year | Tournament | Opponents | Result |
|---|---|---|---|---|
| 1 | 2007 | Henrico County Open | (Australia) Nick Flanagan, (Canada) Bryn Parry, (United States) Roland Thatcher | Flanagan won with birdie on third extra hole Thatcher eliminated by par on second hole Parry eliminated by birdie on first hole |

== Results in major championships ==
| Tournament | 2003 |
|---|---|
| U.S. Open | CUT |

CUT = missed the halfway cut
Note: Baryla only played in the U.S. Open.

== See also ==
- 2009 Nationwide Tour graduates
- 2010 PGA Tour Qualifying School graduates
