= Jerry Smith (golfer) =

American professional golfer

Personal information
- Nationality: United States
- Born: April 24, 1964 (age 62) Council Bluffs, Iowa, U.S.
- Height: 6 ft 1 in (1.85 m)
- Weight: 180 lb (82 kg; 13 st)

Career
- Sport: Golf
- College: Baylor University
- Turned professional: 1987
- Former tours: PGA Tour; Asian PGA Tour; Nationwide Tour; Gateway Tour; Champions Tour
- Professional wins: 6

Number of wins by tour
- Asian Tour: 1
- PGA Tour Champions: 1
- Other: 4

Best results in major championships
- Masters Tournament: DNP
- PGA Championship: CUT: 2014
- U.S. Open: CUT: 1988, 1993, 2005, 2010
- The Open Championship: DNP

Achievements and awards
- Gateway Tour money list winner: 2004
- Champions Tour Rookie of the Year: 2015

Jerry Smith (born April 23, 1964) is an American professional golfer. He has played on the PGA Tour and the Nationwide Tour.

== Early life and amateur career ==
Smith was born in Council Bluffs, Iowa. He played college golf at Baylor University.

== Professional career ==
In 1987, Smith turned professional. Smith played on the Asian Tour for seven years, winning the 1998 Guam Open.

Smith played on the PGA Tour's developmental tour in 1999, 2003, and 2005. His best finishes were a pair of T-2 in 2005 at the Chattanooga Classic, which he lost in a playoff, and the Permian Basin Charity Golf Classic.

Smith played the PGA Tour from 2000 to 2002 and 2006 to 2007. His best finish was a T-3 at the 2001 National Car Rental Golf Classic Disney.

Smith has played in four U.S. Opens but never made the cut.

Smith qualified for the 2015 Champions Tour by finishing third at qualifying school in 2014.

== Personal life ==
Smith lives in Scottsdale, Arizona. He and his wife, Jennifer (née Johnson) Smith, have two daughters, Giavanna and Olivia.

== Professional wins (6) ==
=== Asian PGA Tour wins (1) ===
No.	Date	Tournament	Winning score	Margin of victory	Runners-up
1	May 17, 1998	Guam Open	−16 (69-67-66-70=272)	6 strokes	(India) Arjun Atwal, (South Africa) Chris Williams

Asian PGA Tour playoff record (0–1)

No.	Year	Tournament	Opponent	Result
1	1998	Kuala Lumpur Open	(South Africa) Nico van Rensburg	Lost to birdie on fifth extra hole

=== Gateway Tour wins (3) ===
No.	Date	Tournament	Winning score	Margin of victory	Runner(s)-up
1	Jun 11, 2004	Desert Series 2	−16 (72-66-67-64=269)	1 stroke	(United States) Bret Guetz
2	Jun 17, 2004	Desert Series 3	−19 (69-65-66-65=265)	5 strokes	(United States) Chris Ming, (South Africa) Garth Mulroy
3	Aug 6, 2004	Desert Series 9	−27 (61-62-69-69=261)	2 strokes	(United States) Chez Reavie

=== Other wins (1) ===
- 1991 Waterloo Open Golf Classic

=== Champions Tour wins (1) ===
No.	Date	Tournament	Winning score	Margin of victory	Runner-up
1	Jul 12, 2015	Encompass Championship	−16 (66-64-70=200)	3 strokes	(South Africa) David Frost

== Playoff record ==
Nationwide Tour playoff record (0–1)

No.	Year	Tournament	Opponents	Result
1	2005	Chattanooga Classic	(United States) Joe Daley, (United States) Jason Schultz, (United States) Scott Weatherly	Schultz won with birdie on sixth extra hole Smith and Weatherly eliminated by birdie on first hole

== See also ==
- 1999 PGA Tour Qualifying School graduates
- 2005 Nationwide Tour graduates
