= Roland Thatcher =

American professional golfer (born 1977)

Personal information
- Full name: Roland Churchill Thatcher IV
- Nationality: United States
- Born: April 11, 1977 (age 49) Hampton, Virginia, U.S.
- Height: 5 ft 9 in (1.75 m)
- Weight: 185 lb (84 kg; 13.2 st)

Career
- Sport: Golf
- College: Auburn University
- Turned professional: 2000
- Former tours: PGA Tour; Korn Ferry Tour; Tour de las Américas
- Professional wins: 4

Number of wins by tour
- Korn Ferry Tour: 3
- Other: 1

Best results in major championships
- Masters Tournament: DNP
- PGA Championship: DNP
- U.S. Open: CUT: 2003
- The Open Championship: DNP

Roland Churchill Thatcher IV (born April 11, 1977) is an American professional golfer who has played on the PGA Tour and Korn Ferry Tour.

== Early life ==
Thatcher was born in Hampton, Virginia. At the age of two, his family moved to The Woodlands, Texas. His family lived next to the TPC at The Woodlands.

== Amateur career ==
Thatcher played at Auburn University where he earned All-SEC honors all four years of his career. In 1997 and 1998, the Tigers finished 16th and 10th respectively in the NCAA championships. Thatcher shined in his senior year by winning the SEC Individual Championship and leading Auburn to a second-place finish in the SEC. In 2000, the Tigers won three regular season tournaments and ultimately placed 14th at the NCAA championship. Thatcher earned first team All-SEC and second-team All-American honors.

== Professional career ==
=== Early career ===
In 2000, Thatcher turned pro. He played on the Golden Bear Tour. In 2002, Thatcher joined the Buy.com Tour after finishing 47th at the PGA Tour Qualifying School. In April he recorded his first top-10 finish at the Louisiana Open. In October at the Bank of America Monterey Peninsula Classic he won with a final round of 74 for his first Nationwide Tour victory. He took home $81,000 and a 2-year Nationwide Tour exemption. He had to withdraw from the PGA Tour Qualifying Tournament in December and therefore remained on the developmental tour.

In 2003 Thatcher had four top-10 finishes on the Nationwide Tour, now the name of the PGA Tour's developmental tour, including a tie for 2nd at the Price Cutter Charity Championship where he earned $48,200. He finished off the year making 11 consecutive cuts. He continued his good play with a tie for 28th at the PGA Qualifying Tournament which earned him fully exempt status on the PGA Tour in 2004.

=== PGA Tour ===
As a rookie on the PGA Tour, Thatcher started off the first half of 2004 with little success but things improved in the second half of the year. At the Reno-Tahoe Open at Montreaux Golf Club he shot 66-68-68 in the first three rounds to hold the third-round lead. He then shot a final round five-over par 77 to finish tied for 6th and took home $109,000. At the Bell Canadian Open at Glen Abbey Golf Course in Oakville, Ontario, he finished tied for 26th but had one of the best final rounds. He then finished in a tie for 25th place at the 84 Lumber Classic and tied for 27th at the Chrysler Classic of Greensboro. Because of his rough start, Thatcher finished out of the top-125 on the PGA Tour money list and therefore had to go back to Q-School. He played very well at the PGA Qualifying Tournament finishing in the top-10 and retained his card for 2005.

In 2005 Thatcher finished tied for 8th at the FedEx St. Jude Classic where he fired a final round 69 and took home the largest paycheck of his career at $142,100. At the Buick Open in Grand Blanc, Michigan one of his best moments was being the closest to the pin in the final round at the infamous par-3 17th which is surrounded by some of the rowdiest fans on Tour. He finished tied for 22nd and earned $92,604. Things looked good for Thatcher at this point as he was leading the Tour in the important stat of "Greens in Regulation". However he had a poor finish to the year and ended up 173rd on the money list and therefore had to go back to Q-School. He failed to keep his card finishing outside the top-30.

=== Nationwide Tour ===
Thatcher was therefore back on the Nationwide Tour in 2006. He started the year off well with a top-10 finish at the Jacob's Creek Open Championship in Adelaide, Australia. He received a sponsor's exemption to the PGA Tour's Shell Houston Open and did well finishing 19th and receiving a $74,000 paycheck. Back on the Nationwide Tour, Thatcher also had top-10 finishes at the Xerox Classic and the PalmettoPride Classic. He ended up in 55th on the final 2006 Nationwide Tour money list. At the PGA Tour Qualifying Tournament he failed to earn his PGA Tour card for 2007.

On the Nationwide Tour in 2007, Thatcher got off to a slow start missing the cut three times in his first four tournaments. Things then improved tremendously as he had five top-25 finishes in a row, including a playoff loss to Nick Flanagan at the Henrico County Open where he earned $33,600. After another missed cut, he then had another three top-25 finishes, including a tie for 3rd at the LaSalle Bank Open in Chicago earning him another $43,500. On July 1, he won the 2007 Peek'n Peak Classic and set a new tournament record at 15-under-par. His victory was worth $108,000 and moved him from 10th into 4th place on the Nationwide Tour money list. He was also awarded the Nationwide Tour Player of the Month for June. Thatcher continued his hot play in July as he won for the second time in 2007. With a final score of 24-under-par, he won the Cox Classic by one stroke over Australian Jason Day. The victory earned him $117,000 and moved him into first place on the Nationwide Money list. Thatcher was not able to hold on to the number one spot on the 2007 Nationwide Tour money list though. After his win at the Cox Classic he played in 10 tournaments and only made five cuts. He led the money list going into the Nationwide Tour Championship at Barona Creek but finished in a tie for 29th place while Richard Johnson went on to win the tournament and money list crown. In 28 tournaments he recorded six top-10 finishes and fifteen top-25 finishes. Thatcher finished in 2nd place on the final 2007 Money List, earning his PGA Tour card for 2008. He also became only the third player in Nationwide Tour history to earn at least $400,000 in one year.

=== Return to PGA Tour ===
Thatcher was back on the PGA Tour after an absence of two years. In February, at the Mayakoba Golf Classic at Riviera Maya-Cancun in Mexico, he shot a career best 61 in the third round. Although he made the cut on the number, he ended up finishing with his first top-10 of the year. In April he finished T-7 at the EDS Byron Nelson Championship earning $179,733, the largest payday of his career. He had arthroscopic surgery on his wrist that sidelined him for the remainder of the 2008 season.

Thatcher's current best PGA Tour finish came in 2009. Thatcher finished runner-up to Tiger Woods in the Buick Open. This result meant that Thatcher had earned enough to complete the rest of the season on a medical extension. He finished the season ranked 121st on the money list to retain his tour card for 2010.

Thatcher was well out of Top-125 on the money list for much of the season. He finished second at the Children's Miracle Network Classic and went from 187th to 122nd, just enough to keep his PGA Tour card.

After finishing just inside the Top-125 of the PGA Tour the past two seasons, Thatcher ended 2011 127th, two spots and just $1,795 out of retaining full Tour status.

== Professional wins (4) ==
=== Nationwide Tour wins (3) ===
No.	Date	Tournament	Winning score	Margin of victory	Runner-up
1	Oct 6, 2002	Bank of America Monterey Peninsula Classic	−5 (66-72-71-74=283)	2 strokes	(Australia) Aaron Baddeley
2	Jul 1, 2007	Peek'n Peak Classic	−15 (69-67-69-68=273)	3 strokes	(United States) Paul Claxton
3	Jul 29, 2007	Cox Classic	−24 (64-63-68-65=260)	1 stroke	(Australia) Jason Day

Nationwide Tour playoff record (0–1)

No.	Year	Tournament	Opponents	Result
1	2007	Henrico County Open	(Canada) Chris Baryla, (Australia) Nick Flanagan, (Canada) Bryn Parry	Flanagan won with birdie on third extra hole Thatcher eliminated by par on second hole Parry eliminated by birdie on first hole

=== Tour de las Américas wins (1) ===
No.	Date	Tournament	Winning score	Margin of victory	Runner-up
1	Feb 10, 2002	Los Encinos Open	−10 (71-67-68-72=278)	2 strokes	(Argentina) Rafael Gómez

== Results in major championships ==
Tournament	2003
U.S. Open	CUT

CUT = missed the halfway cut
Note: Thatcher only played in the U.S. Open.

== See also ==
- 2003 PGA Tour Qualifying School graduates
- 2004 PGA Tour Qualifying School graduates
- 2007 Nationwide Tour graduates
