= Chattanooga Classic =

Chattanooga Classic may refer to either of two now-defunct golf tournaments:

- Chattanooga Classic (PGA Tour), a PGA Tour event played from 1983 to 1992
- Children's Hospital Classic, a Nationwide Tour event played from 2003 to 2011 and known as the Chattanooga Classic from 2003 to 2010
