= Joe Daley (golfer) =

American professional golfer (born 1960)

Personal information
- Nationality: United States
- Born: October 30, 1960 (age 66) Chestnut Hill, Pennsylvania, U.S.
- Height: 6 ft 3 in (1.91 m)
- Weight: 159 lb (72 kg; 11.4 st)

Career
- Sport: Golf
- College: Old Dominion University
- Turned professional: 1991
- Former tours: PGA Tour; Nationwide Tour; PGA Tour Champions
- Professional wins: 3

Number of wins by tour
- Korn Ferry Tour: 2
- PGA Tour Champions: 1

Best results in major championships
- Masters Tournament: DNP
- PGA Championship: DNP
- U.S. Open: CUT: 2000, 2007
- The Open Championship: DNP

Joe Daley (born October 30, 1960) is an American professional golfer formerly of the PGA Tour and Nationwide Tour. He now plays on the PGA Tour Champions. On 1 July 2012, Daley won the Senior Players Championship for his first major victory on the Champions Tour.

== Early life and amateur career ==
Daley was born in Chestnut Hill, Pennsylvania, attended and played golf at Plymouth-Whitemarsh High School before walking on to the golf team at Old Dominion University. He graduated in 1982. After college, Daley worked as a wholesale credit manager for ten years.

== Professional career ==
In 1992, Daley turned pro at the advanced age of 32. He played on the Nationwide Tour in 1997 and 1999 to 2009. He earned his PGA Tour card in 1996 and 1998 and played in 60 events on the major tour. His best finish was a tie for sixth at the 1996 B.C. Open. In the 2000 PGA Tour Q-School tournament, he rolled in a five-foot putt during the fourth round, only to have the ball pop out of the off-center cup and back onto the putting surface. He missed his PGA Tour card by a single stroke.

Daley's best finish in 2007 on the Nationwide Tour was a fourth place at the Legend Financial Group Classic. He also shot his best round on the PGA Tour in 2007 during round two of the Sony Open in Hawaii. He completed 2007 ranked 66th on the Nationwide Tour money list ranking. He played the Nationwide Tour again in 2008 and had three top-10 finishes, including third place at the Livermore Valley Wine Country Championship. His low round is a 64 at the Preferred Health Systems Wichita Open. He completed the year at 59th on the money list with $113,597 in winnings so he retained his Nationwide Tour card for the 2009 season. This marked the sixth straight season that Daley earned his full-time Nationwide card. He made the cut in 14 out of 27 events in 2008, and was 10th in driving accuracy at 73.22%.

=== Senior career ===
Daley played in his first Champions Tour event at the Allianz Championship in Boca Raton, Florida in February 2011, finishing in a tie for 17th. In 2012, Daley recorded his first ever professional major top-five finish, when he tied for fourth at the Senior PGA Championship. Then later in the year at the Senior Players Championship in Pittsburgh, Daley won his first Champions Tour event and his maiden senior major with a final round of 68. He finished at 14-under-par and two strokes ahead of Tom Lehman.

In three seasons on the Senior tour, Daley has earned over $1 million. In the 2013 Champions Tour Q-School, Daley finished in the top thirty to earn partial sponsor's exemptions for the 2014 season.

For the 2013 and 2014 seasons, Daley has earned over $300,000 each year, with 2 top tens and 7 top 25s cumulatively. In the majors, Daley had a best of tie for 20th in the 2013 U.S. Senior Open. Daley also had a personal best in regular tournament of tie for 3rd in the Shaw Charity Classic in 2014.

== Professional wins (3) ==
=== Nationwide Tour wins (2) ===
No.	Date	Tournament	Winning score	Margin of victory	Runner-up
1	Mar 30, 1997	Nike Louisiana Open	−18 (62-67-69=198) (Note: Shortened to 54 holes due to weather.)	3 strokes	(United States) Bobby Wadkins
2	Jul 31, 2005	Preferred Health Systems Wichita Open	−16 (71-67-65-65=268)	Playoff	(United States) Shane Bertsch

Nationwide Tour playoff record (1–1)

No.	Year	Tournament	Opponent(s)	Result
1	2005	Chattanooga Classic	(United States) Jason Schultz, (United States) Jerry Smith, (United States) Scott Weatherly	Schultz won with birdie on sixth extra hole Smith and Weatherly eliminated by birdie on first hole
2	2005	Preferred Health Systems Wichita Open	(United States) Shane Bertsch	Won with birdie on first extra hole

=== Champions Tour wins (1) ===
Legend
Champions Tour major championships (1)
Other Champions Tour (0)

No.	Date	Tournament	Winning score	Margin of victory	Runner-up
1	Jul 1, 2012	Constellation Senior Players Championship	−14 (66-64-68-68=266)	2 strokes	(United States) Tom Lehman

== Results in major championships ==
Tournament	2000	2001	2002	2003	2004	2005	2006	2007
U.S. Open	CUT							CUT

Did not play

CUT = missed the half-way cut
Note: Daley only played in the U.S. Open.

== Senior major championships ==
=== Wins (1) ===
Year	Championship	54 holes	Winning score	Margin	Runner-up
2012	Constellation Senior Players Championship	Tied for lead	−14 (66-64-68-68=266)	2 strokes	(United States) Tom Lehman

=== Senior results timeline ===
Results not in chronological order before 2017.

Tournament	2011	2012	2013	2014	2015	2016	2017
The Tradition			T57	T67	56	T38	T72
Senior PGA Championship	T68	T4	CUT	T39	WD	CUT	
U.S. Senior Open	66	CUT	T20	CUT			
Senior Players Championship		1	T34	T44	T64	T25	78
The Senior Open Championship		CUT	T65	T39		T41	T23

Win
Top 10
Did not play

CUT = missed the half-way cut
WD = withdrew
"T" = indicates a tie for a place

== See also ==
- 1995 PGA Tour Qualifying School graduates
- 1997 Nike Tour graduates
