= 2003 PGA Tour Qualifying School graduates =

This is a list of the 34 players who earned their 2004 PGA Tour card through Q School in 2003.

Place	Player	PGA Tour starts	Cuts made	Notes
1	(Sweden) Mathias Grönberg	16	6	4 European Tour wins
2	(United States) Danny Ellis	55	22	Runner-up in 1993 U.S. Amateur
3	(United States) Michael Allen	160	77	1 European Tour win, 1 Nationwide Tour win
T4	(United States) David Branshaw	0	0	
T4	(United States) John Riegger	157	78	
6	(Sweden) Daniel Chopra	0	0	1 Asian Tour win, 2 Challenge Tour wins
T7	(United States) Omar Uresti	199	103	1 Nationwide Tour win
T7	(United States) John Maginnes	167	84	
T7	(India) Arjun Atwal	6	2	2 European Tour wins, 6 Asian Tour wins
T7	(United States) Wes Short Jr.	1	0	
T7	(United States) Kris Cox	1	0	
T12	(South Africa) Tjaart van der Walt	1	1	
T12	(United States) Brian Bateman	60	26	1 Nationwide Tour win
T12	(United States) Ken Duke	7	2	2 Canadian Tour wins
T12	(United States) Dan Olsen	3	1	
T16	(United States) Hunter Mahan	11	5	
T16	(United States) Kevin Muncrief	0	0	0
T16	(United States) Brian Kortan	0	0	
T16	(United States) Russ Cochran	569	345	1 PGA Tour win
T16	(United States) Todd Hamilton	12	4	11 Japan Golf Tour wins
T21	(United States) Steve Pate	509	349	6 PGA Tour wins, played on Ryder Cup teams in 1991 and 1999
T21	(United States) Rich Barcelo	1	0	
T21	(United States) Roger Tambellini	0	0	1 Nationwide Tour win
T21	(United States) Kevin Na	3	1	1 Asian Tour win
T21	(Australia) Scott Hend	0	0	1 Canadian Tour win
T26	(United States) Boyd Summerhays	0	0	
T26	(Namibia) Trevor Dodds	278	139	1 PGA Tour win, 4 Nationwide Tour wins, 4 Sunshine Tour wins, 6 Canadian Tour wins
T28	(Japan) Hirofumi Miyase	6	1	6 Japan Golf Tour wins
T28	(United States) Roland Thatcher	2	0	1 Nationwide Tour win
T28	(South Africa) Deane Pappas	93	36	2 Nationwide Tour wins, 1 Sunshine Tour win
T28	(United States) Jay Delsing	483	242	2 Nationwide Tour wins
T28	(United States) Brian Gay	160	87	
T28	(New Zealand) Grant Waite	339	182	1 PGA Tour win, 1 PGA Tour of Australasia win
T28	(United States) Danny Briggs	115	50	

- Players in yellow are 2004 PGA Tour rookies.

== 2004 Results ==
Player	Starts	Cuts made	Best finish	Money list rank	Earnings ($)
(Sweden) Mathias Grönberg*	32	12	9/T9 (twice)	132	565,014
(United States) Danny Ellis	26	14	T7	144	490,413
(United States) Michael Allen	28	15	2	88	882,872
(United States) David Branshaw*	30	11	T14 (twice)	169	293,617
(United States) John Riegger	17	10	7	153	423,263
(Sweden) Daniel Chopra*	33	20	T4	108	763,253
(United States) Omar Uresti	28	14	T10	163	345,797
(United States) John Maginnes	12	2	T41	240	26,420
(India) Arjun Atwal*	30	12	6	146	486,052
(United States) Wes Short Jr.*	12	4	T24	222	75,536
(United States) Kris Cox*	26	10	T18	190	205,171
(South Africa) Tjaart van der Walt*	12	6	T21	204	138,785
(United States) Brian Bateman	24	18	3	86	919,255
(United States) Ken Duke*	30	14	T9	166	301,309
(United States) Dan Olsen*	31	8	T12	207	135,731
(United States) Hunter Mahan*	30	16	T2	100	813,089
(United States) Kevin Muncrief*	21	3	T56	244	21,660
(United States) Brian Kortan*	24	8	T13	200	159,939
(United States) Russ Cochran	25	13	T24 (twice)	194	185,108
(United States) Todd Hamilton*	27	19	Win (twice)	11	3,063,778
(United States) Steve Pate	24	10	T15	191	199,569
(United States) Rich Barcelo*	26	8	T16	186	223,597
(United States) Roger Tambellini*	28	12	T14	181	234,164
(United States) Kevin Na*	32	19	T3	87	901,158
(Australia) Scott Hend*	29	11	3	136	531,263
(United States) Boyd Summerhays*	8	1	T25	236	37,127
(Namibia) Trevor Dodds	20	4	T29	231	45,015
(Japan) Hirofumi Miyase*	27	5	T9	199	162,120
(United States) Roland Thatcher*	23	9	T5	177	247,987
(South Africa) Deane Pappas	22	14	T11	161	346,633
(United States) Jay Delsing	26	11	T19	193	190,184
(United States) Brian Gay	32	16	T5	122	645,194
(New Zealand) Grant Waite	29	10	T11	180	239,318
(United States) Danny Briggs	28	15	T7	157	397,606

*PGA Tour rookie in 2004
T = Tied
Green background indicates the player retained his PGA Tour card for 2005 (finished inside the top 125).
Yellow background indicates the player did not retain his PGA Tour card for 2005, but retained conditional status (finished between 126-150).
Red background indicates the player did not retain his PGA Tour card for 2005 (finished outside the top 150).

== Winners on the PGA Tour in 2004 ==
No.	Date	Player	Tournament	Winning score	Margin of victory	Runner-up
1	Mar 14	(United States) Todd Hamilton	Honda Classic	−12 (68-66-68-74=276)	1 stroke	(United States) Davis Love III
2	Jul 18	(United States) Todd Hamilton	The Open Championship	−10 (71-67-67-69=274)	Playoff	(South Africa) Ernie Els

== Runners-up on the PGA Tour in 2004 ==
No.	Date	Player	Tournament	Winner	Winning score	Runner-up score
1	Aug 22	(United States) Hunter Mahan lost in four-man playoff	Reno-Tahoe Open	(United States) Vaughn Taylor	−10 (67-67-69-65=278)	−10 (69-67-68-74=278)
2	Oct 17	(United States) Michael Allen	Chrysler Classic of Greensboro	(United States) Brent Geiberger	−18 (66-67-71-66=270)	−16 (70-67-68-67=272)

== See also ==
- 2003 Nationwide Tour graduates
