= John Mallinger =

American professional golfer (born 1979)

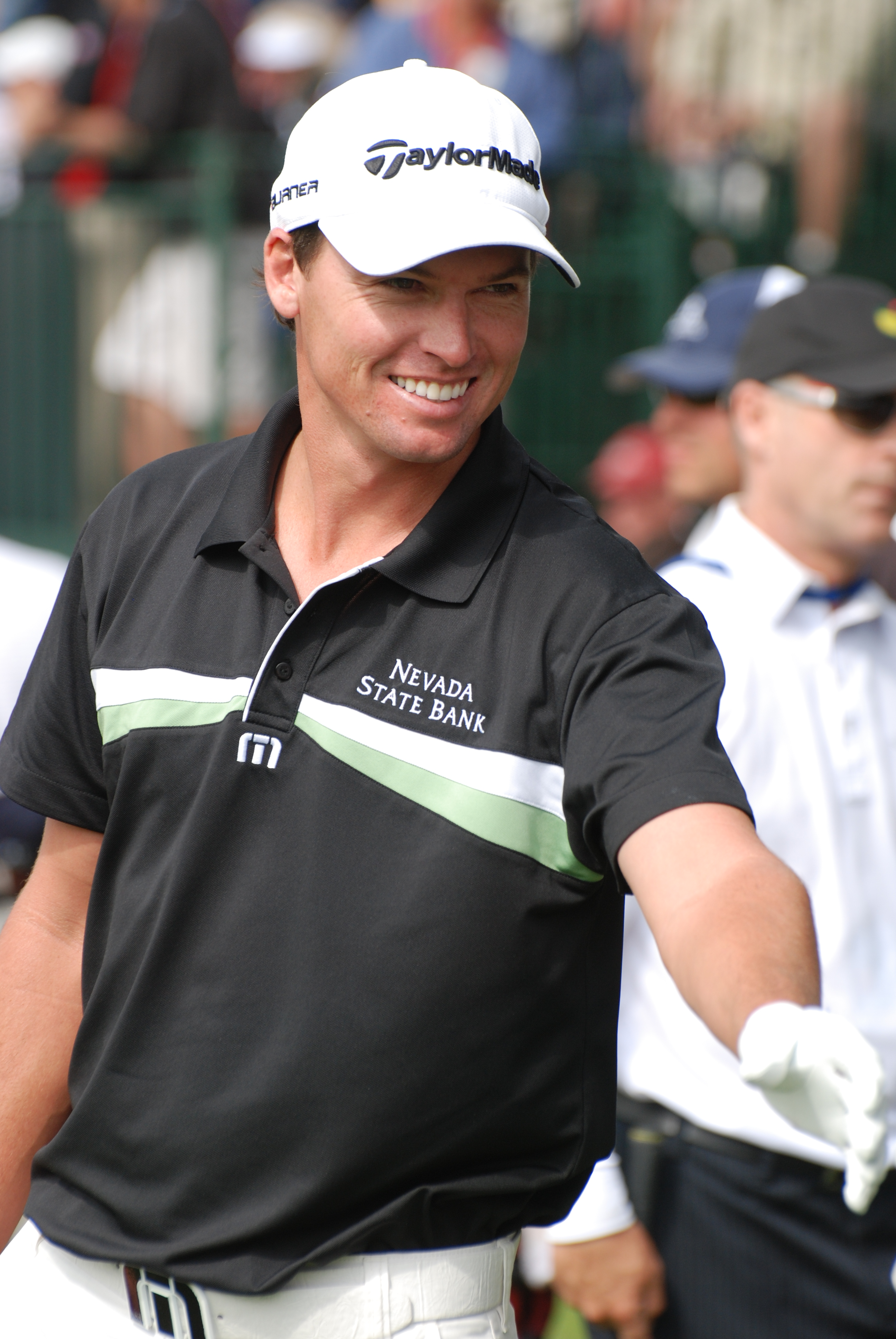
- Mallinger at the 2009 U.S. Open

Personal information
- Full name: John Charles Mallinger
- Nationality: United States
- Born: September 25, 1979 (age 47) Escondido, California, U.S.
- Height: 6 ft 0 in (1.83 m)
- Weight: 170 lb (77 kg; 12 st)

Career
- Sport: Golf
- College: Long Beach State
- Turned professional: 2002
- Current tour: Web.com Tour
- Former tour: PGA Tour
- Professional wins: 1
- Highest ranking: 85 (August 2, 2009)

Best results in major championships
- Masters Tournament: DNP
- PGA Championship: T60: 2008, 2009
- U.S. Open: T22: 2010
- The Open Championship: DNP

John Charles Mallinger (born September 25, 1979) is an American professional golfer.

== Early life ==
Mallinger was born in Escondido, California, and is the youngest of four children. He graduated from Escondido High School.

== Amateur career ==
Mallinger attended California State University, Long Beach. He earned a bachelor's degree in marketing from the university.

== Professional career ==
Early in his professional career, Mallinger played on the minitours and developmental tours. Before playing on the PGA Tour, Mallinger won two events on the NGA Hooters Tour. Mallinger was a medalist at the 2005 Canadian Tour Qualifying School. During this era, he also played on the Nationwide Tour, the PGA Tour's developmental tour. He earned the nickname “Monday Mally” by getting through several fall Monday Qualifying events and playing in enough Nationwide Tour events in 2005 to earn playing privileges for 2006 on the Nationwide Tour. He breezed through all stages of the Qualifying School that year to earn his 2007 PGA Tour Card. He earned over $1,600,000 on the PGA Tour in 2007, finishing runner-up to Brandt Snedeker for Rookie of the Year honors. In 2008, he finished 91st on the money list once again retaining tour membership. In 2009, Mallinger had another successful year finishing in a tie for 3rd at The Players Championship and runner-up at the U.S. Bank Championship in Milwaukee where he lost a sudden death playoff to Bo Van Pelt. He finished in the top 50 of the money list for the first time.

In 2011, Mallinger played in only 15 PGA Tour events due to his conditional status. He did not make the FedEx Cup and played on the Nationwide Tour during his time off the PGA Tour. He regained his PGA Tour card with a 14th-place finish on the Nationwide Tour money list, despite playing in only nine events, but earning six consecutive top-10 finishes.

Mallinger finished in a tie for 2nd place in his second start of the 2012 PGA Tour season at the Humana Challenge, two strokes behind Mark Wilson. This was the second time that Mallinger had been a runner-up on the PGA Tour and remains tied for his best finish to date.

== Personal life ==
Mallinger resides in Long Beach, California, and plays out of Virginia Country Club, along with pros John Merrick and Peter Tomasulo.

== Professional wins (1) ==
=== Other wins (1) ===
No.	Date	Tournament	Winning score	Margin of victory	Runner-up
1	Nov 21, 2010	Callaway Golf Pebble Beach Invitational	−15 (70-65-70-68=273)	2 strokes	(United States) Jason Gore

== Playoff record ==
PGA Tour playoff record (0–1)

No.	Year	Tournament	Opponent	Result
1	2009	U.S. Bank Championship in Milwaukee	(United States) Bo Van Pelt	Lost to birdie on second extra hole

== Results in major championships ==
Tournament	2005	2006	2007	2008	2009	2010
U.S. Open	T67	CUT		T65	T45	T22
PGA Championship				T60	T60	

Did not play

CUT = missed the half-way cut
"T" = tied
Note: Mallinger never played in the Masters Tournament or The Open Championship.

== Results in The Players Championship ==
Tournament	2007	2008	2009	2010	2011	2012
The Players Championship	T64	CUT	T3	CUT		CUT

Top 10
Did not play

CUT = missed the halfway cut
"T" indicates a tie for a place

== See also ==
- 2006 PGA Tour Qualifying School graduates
- 2011 Nationwide Tour graduates
