= Gila River Golf Classic =

Former Nationwide Tour event

Tournament information
- Location: Chandler, Arizona
- Established: 2001
- Course: Whirlwind Golf Club
- Par: 72
- Length: 7,356 yards (6,726 m)
- Tour: Nationwide Tour
- Format: Stroke play
- Prize fund: US$450,000
- Month played: October
- Final year: 2005

Tournament record score
- Aggregate: 261 Jason Caron (2001); 261 Ben Crane (2001); 261 Bo Van Pelt (2001)
- To par: −23 as above

Final champion
- (United States) Peter Tomasulo
- Location in the United States Location in Arizona

The Gila River Golf Classic was a golf tournament on the Nationwide Tour from 2001 to 2005. It was played at the Wild Horse Pass Resort's Whirlwind Golf Club on the Gila River Indian Community near Chandler, Arizona. The first two years it was played on the Devil's Claw course then shifted to the Cattail course for the final three years.

The purse in 2005 was US$450,000, with $81,000 going to the winner.

== Winners ==
Year	Winner	Score	To par	Margin of victory	Runner(s)-up
Gila River Golf Classic
2005	(Australia) David McKenzie	268	−20	1 stroke	(Canada) Jon Mills
Gila River Classic
2004	(United States) Chris Nallen	264	−24	8 strokes	(United States) Troy Matteson
2003	(United States) Lucas Glover	270	−18	1 stroke	(United States) John Elliott (United States) Robin Freeman (United States) Tommy Tolles
2002	(United States) David Branshaw	262	−22	6 strokes	(Australia) Aaron Baddeley (United States) Charles Raulerson
Buy.com Gila River Classic
2001	(United States) Ben Crane	261	−23	Playoff	(United States) Jason Caron (United States) Bo Van Pelt
