= Lehigh Valley Open =

Golf tournament

Nike Lehigh Valley Open
Tournament information
- Location: Center Valley, Pennsylvania, U.S.
- Established: 1998
- Course: Center Valley Club
- Par: 72
- Tour: Nike Tour
- Format: Stroke play
- Prize fund: $225,000
- Month played: June
- Final year: 1999

Tournament record score
- Aggregate: 270 Mathew Goggin (1999)
- To par: −18 as above

Final champion
- (Australia) Mathew Goggin
- Location in the United States Location in Pennsylvania

The Lehigh Valley Open was a golf tournament on the Nike Tour. It ran from 1998 to 1999. It was played at Center Valley Club in Center Valley, Pennsylvania.

In 1998 the winner earned $40,500.

== Winners ==
Year	Winner	Score	To par	Margin of victory	Runner-up
Nike Lehigh Valley Open
1999	(Australia) Mathew Goggin	270	−18	2 strokes	(United States) Matt Gogel
1998	(United States) Eric Booker	271	−17	Playoff	(United States) Notah Begay III
