= Richard Johnson (Welsh golfer) =

Welsh golfer

Personal information
- Nationality: Wales
- Born: 2 February 1972 (age 54) Cardiff, Wales
- Height: 6 ft 4 in (1.93 m)
- Weight: 220 lb (100 kg; 16 st)

Career
- Sport: Golf
- College: Augusta State University
- Turned professional: 1995
- Former tours: PGA Tour; Nationwide Tour; Challenge Tour; PGA EuroPro Tour
- Professional wins: 5

Number of wins by tour
- Korn Ferry Tour: 4
- Other: 1

Achievements and awards
- Nationwide Tour money list winner: 2007

Richard Johnson (born 2 February 1972) is a Welsh professional golfer.

== Early life ==
Johnson's father, Peter, is the former pro at Vale of Glamorgan in Cardiff, Wales and is chairman of the PGA in Wales. Peter Johnson is now the professional at Ridgeway Golf Club in Caerphilly.

== Professional career ==
Johnson played on the PGA Tour's developmental tour from 1999 to 2007. During the final year of this timespan, he led the Nationwide Tour's money list to earn his PGA Tour card. However, he was unable to retain his card and returned to the Nationwide Tour. At the 2009 Michael Hill New Zealand Open, Johnson scored a hole in one on the par-4 15th hole for which he won a pallet of Heineken beer. He was the second Nationwide Tour golfer to score a hole-in-one on a par-4.

== Professional wins (5) ==
=== Nationwide Tour wins (4) ===
Legend
Tour Championships (1)
Other Nationwide Tour (3)

No.	Date	Tournament	Winning score	Margin of victory	Runner(s)-up
1	7 Feb 1999	Nike Florida Classic	−14 (68-65-68-69=270)	1 stroke	(United States) Bobby Wadkins
2	1 Oct 2000	Buy.com Monterey Peninsula Classic	−3 (75-71-71-68=285)	1 stroke	(United States) Michael Allen
3	7 Oct 2007	Mark Christopher Charity Classic	−11 (65-72-69-67=273)	Playoff	(United States) Jeremy Anderson, (Australia) Matt Jones
4	4 Nov 2007	Nationwide Tour Championship	−20 (66-64-67-67=264)	1 stroke	(United States) Michael Letzig

Nationwide Tour playoff record (1–0)

No.	Year	Tournament	Opponents	Result
1	2007	Mark Christopher Charity Classic	(United States) Jeremy Anderson, (Australia) Matt Jones	Won with birdie on first extra hole

=== PGA EuroPro Tour wins (1) ===
No.	Date	Tournament	Winning score	Margin of victory	Runner-up
1	27 Aug 2005	Pokermillion.com Classic	−16 (67-64-66=197)	4 strokes	(England) Warren Bennett

== Results in The Players Championship ==
Tournament	2008
The Players Championship	CUT

CUT = missed the halfway cut

== Team appearances ==
Amateur

- Jacques Léglise Trophy (representing Great Britain & Ireland): 1988 (winners), 1989 (winners)
- European Amateur Team Championship (representing Wales): 1991, 1993 (winners)
- St Andrews Trophy (representing Great Britain & Ireland): 1994 (winners)

Professional

- World Cup (representing Wales): 2008

== See also ==
- 2007 Nationwide Tour graduates
- List of golfers with most Web.com Tour wins
