= Brian Bateman =

American professional golfer (born 1973)

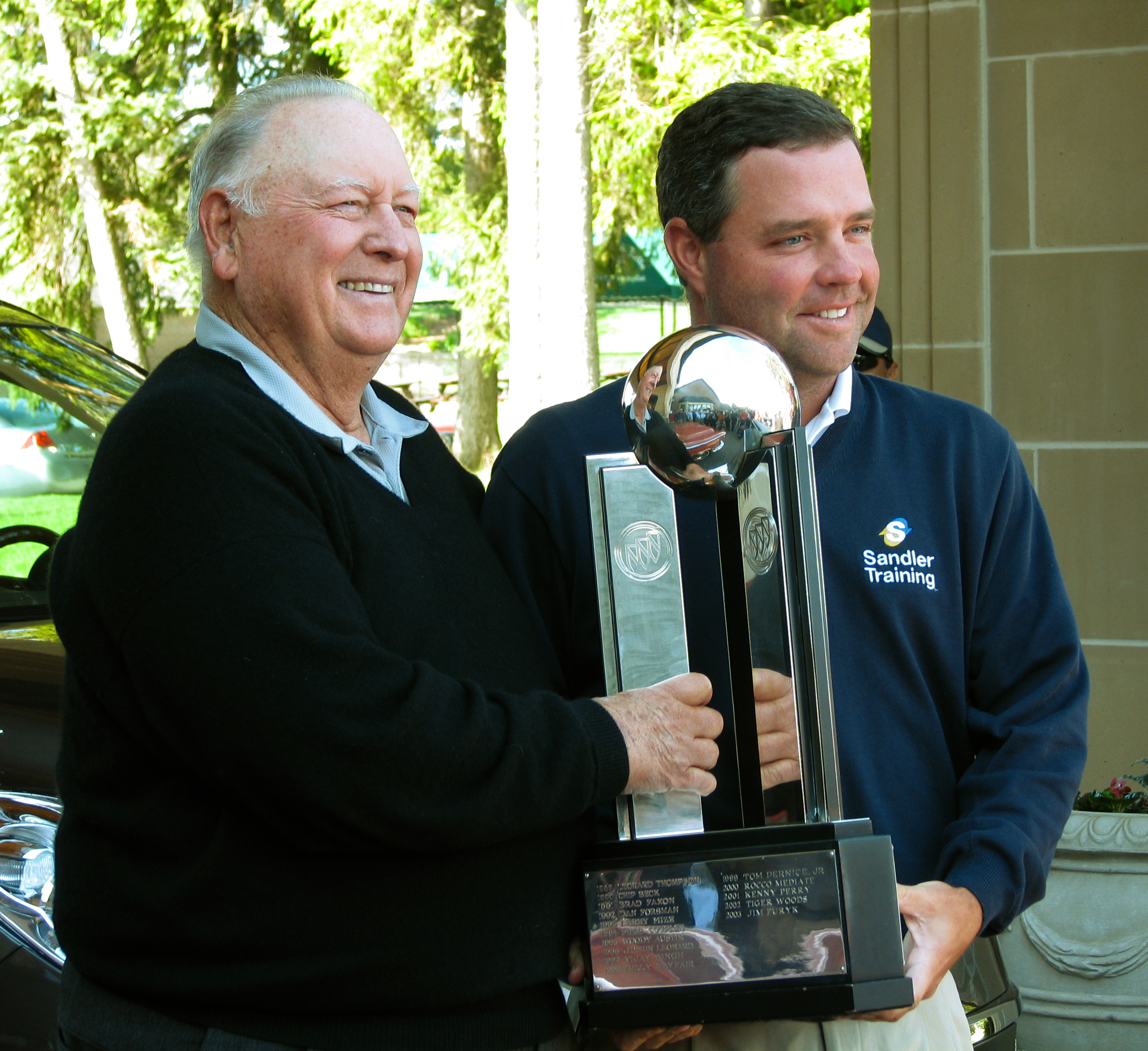
- Bateman (right) and Billy Casper in 2008

Personal information
- Nationality: United States
- Born: February 25, 1973 (age 53) Monroe, Louisiana, U.S.
- Height: 5 ft 10 in (1.78 m)
- Weight: 185 lb (84 kg; 13.2 st)

Career
- Sport: Golf
- College: Louisiana State University
- Turned professional: 1996
- Former tour: PGA Tour
- Professional wins: 2

Number of wins by tour
- PGA Tour: 1
- Korn Ferry Tour: 1

Best results in major championships
- Masters Tournament: T20: 2008
- PGA Championship: T50: 2007
- U.S. Open: DNP
- The Open Championship: DNP

Brian Bateman (born February 25, 1973) is an American professional golfer, who played on the PGA Tour.

== Early life and amateur career ==
Bateman was born in Monroe, Louisiana. He played collegiately at Louisiana State University (LSU) where he graduated in 1996 with a degree in marketing.

== Professional career ==
In 1996, Bateman turned professional. Bateman played on the Nationwide Tour from 1997 to 2001 and 2010 to 2011, winning once.

Bateman played on the PGA Tour from 2002 to 2009. He got his only win at the 2007 Buick Open. After a poor 2009 season Bateman lost his PGA Tour playing rights. He is now an analyst for PGA Tour Live, which provides live streaming coverage of featured groups during rounds one and two of most non-major tournaments.

== Personal life ==
Bateman lives on St. Simons Island, Georgia with his wife and son.

== Professional wins (2) ==
=== PGA Tour wins (1) ===
No.	Date	Tournament	Winning score	To par	Margin of victory	Runners-up
1	Jul 1, 2007	Buick Open	65-70-69-69=273	−15	1 stroke	(United States) Jason Gore, (United States) Justin Leonard, (United States) Woody Austin

=== Nike Tour wins (1) ===
No.	Date	Tournament	Winning score	To par	Margin of victory	Runner-up
1	May 10, 1998	Nike Carolina Classic	68-66-67-65=266	−18	1 stroke	(United States) Jimmy Green

Nike Tour playoff record (0–1)

No.	Year	Tournament	Opponent	Result
1	1998	Nike Tri-Cities Open	(United States) Matt Gogel	Lost to par on third extra hole

== Results in major championships ==
Tournament	2004	2005	2006	2007	2008
Masters Tournament					T20
PGA Championship	CUT			T50	

Did not play

CUT = missed the half-way cut
"T" = Tied
Note: Bateman never played in the U.S. Open or The Open Championship.

== Results in The Players Championship ==
Tournament	2005	2006	2007	2008
The Players Championship	T56			CUT

Did not play

CUT = missed the halfway cut
"T" indicates a tie for a place

== Results in World Golf Championships ==
Tournament	2007
Match Play	
Championship	
Invitational	T74

Did not play

"T" = Tied

== See also ==
- 2001 PGA Tour Qualifying School graduates
- 2002 PGA Tour Qualifying School graduates
- 2003 PGA Tour Qualifying School graduates
- 2005 PGA Tour Qualifying School graduates
- 2006 PGA Tour Qualifying School graduates
