= North Shore Country Club =

Country club in Glenview, Illinois

- Interactive map of North Shore Country Club
- 43.212538°N 87.947950°W

Club information
- Established: 1900
- Type: Private
- Tota holes: 18
- Tournaments: U.S. Open (1933); Western Open (1928); U.S. Amateur (1983, 1939); Encompass Championship (2013, 2014, 2015)
- Website: http://www.north-shorecc.org/
- Designed by: H. S. Colt C. H. Alison Rick Jacobson Dick Nugent
- Par: 72
- Course rating: 75.0
- Slope rating: 140

North Shore Country Club is a private country club in Glenview, Illinois, a suburb of Chicago.

Founded in 1900, it features a 7,031 yard 18-hole golf course. In 1933, it hosted the U.S. Open that was won by Johnny Goodman. It has also hosted the Western Open once and the U.S. Amateur twice. It was host site of the Encompass Championship on the Champions Tour from 2013 to 2015.

The course was designed by English architect Charles Allison of Colt MacKenzie and Alison.
