= Stonewater Golf Course =

Coordinates: 41°33′47″N 81°28′16″W

Stonewater Golf Club is a semi-private regulation golf course and facility built in 1996 in Highland Heights, Ohio. Designed by Michael Hurdzan and Dana Fry, the course covers 178 acres (0.72 km^{2}). Sixteen of the eighteen holes have water hazards which necessitated 23 wooden bridges. The course is also well wooded, with seventy sand bunkers. Its par is 71. The course is designed around the residential neighborhood of Aberdeen.

== Nationwide Tour ==
The course has a three-year contract (2005-2007) with the Nationwide Tour, in which the golf course holds a stop of the tour during the summer.

=== Titles ===
- 2005 - Cleveland Open. Was not aired on TV.
- 2006 - Legend Financial Group Classic. Aired August 31 - September 3 on The Golf Channel.
- 2007 - Legend Financial Group Classic. To be aired July 5–8 on The Golf Channel.
