= Eric Booker (golfer) =

American professional golfer (born 1963)

Personal information
- Nationality: United States
- Born: December 21, 1963 (age 62) Pontiac, Michigan, U.S.
- Height: 6 ft 0 in (1.83 m)
- Weight: 185 lb (84 kg; 13.2 st)

Career
- Sport: Golf
- College: Mississippi State University
- Turned professional: 1990
- Former tours: PGA Tour; Nationwide Tour
- Professional wins: 2

Number of wins by tour
- Korn Ferry Tour: 2

Best results in major championships
- Masters Tournament: DNP
- PGA Championship: CUT: 1996
- U.S. Open: CUT: 1991
- The Open Championship: DNP

Eric Booker (born December 21, 1963) is an American professional golfer who played on the PGA Tour and the Nationwide Tour. He is currently the men's golf coach at Florida Gulf Coast University.

== Professional career ==
In 1990, Booker turned pro. He joined the Ben Hogan Tour that year. He then took a hiatus from the Tour until 1997 and won the Nike Greater Austin Open that year. In 1998 he won the Nike Lehigh Valley Open and recorded nine top-10 finishes en route to a 4th-place finish on the money list, earning his PGA Tour card for 1999. On his rookie year on Tour, he recorded a tied for fourth and tied for third finish. He did not do as well on Tour in 2000 and returned to the Nationwide Tour in 2001, his last year on Tour.

== Professional wins (2) ==
=== Nike Tour wins (2) ===
| No. | Date | Tournament | Winning score | Margin of victory | Runner-up |
|---|---|---|---|---|---|
| 1 | Apr 6, 1997 | Nike Greater Austin Open | −4 (69-71=140) (Note: Shortened to 36 holes due to weather.) | 1 stroke | (United States) Brian Kamm |
| 2 | Jun 21, 1998 | Nike Lehigh Valley Open | −17 (67-67-72-65=271) | Playoff | (United States) Notah Begay III |

Nike Tour playoff record (1–0)

| No. | Year | Tournament | Opponent | Result |
|---|---|---|---|---|
| 1 | 1998 | Nike Lehigh Valley Open | (United States) Notah Begay III | Won with birdie on ninth extra hole |

== Results in major championships ==
| Tournament | 1991 | 1992 | 1993 | 1994 | 1995 | 1996 |
|---|---|---|---|---|---|---|
| U.S. Open | CUT | | | | | |
| PGA Championship | | | | | | CUT |

Did not play

CUT = missed the half-way cut
Note: Booker never played in the Masters Tournament or The Open Championship.

== See also ==
- 1998 Nike Tour graduates
