= 2006 PGA Tour Qualifying School graduates =

This is a list of the 40 players who earned their 2007 PGA Tour card through Q School in 2006.

Place	Player	PGA Tour starts	Cuts made	Notes
1	(United States) George McNeill	4	0	
2	(United States) Robert Garrigus	29	15	
3	(United States) Rich Barcelo	31	9	
T4	(Denmark) Anders Hansen	9	4	1 European Tour win
T4	(United States) John Merrick	1	0	1 Nationwide Tour win; already qualified through 2006 Nationwide Tour
T4	(United States) Cameron Beckman	215	130	1 PGA Tour win
7	(United States) Steve Wheatcroft	3	0	
T8	(United States) Steve Marino	1	1	
T8	(United States) Paul Stankowski	306	169	2 PGA Tour wins
T8	(United States) Tom Johnson	0	0	
T8	(United States) Bob Heintz	88	24	2 Nationwide Tour wins
T8	(Australia) Paul Gow	112	49	3 Nationwide Tour wins, 1 PGA Tour of Australasia win
T13	(United States) Ryan Armour	0	0	
T13	(United States) John Mallinger	4	2	
T13	(United States) Anthony Kim	2	2	
T16	(United States) Chris Stroud	2	1	
T16	(South Korea) Charlie Wi	25	10	1 European Tour win, 7 Asian Tour wins
T16	(South Africa) Craig Lile	1	0	
T16	(United States) Parker McLachlin	4	2	
T16	(United States) Glen Day	363	217	1 PGA Tour win
T16	(United States) Darron Stiles	71	38	4 Nationwide Tour wins
T22	(United States) Marco Dawson	325	170	1 Nationwide Tour win
T22	(Germany) Alex Čejka	131	75	4 European Tour wins
T22	(United States) Scott Gutschewski	47	24	1 Nationwide Tour win
T25	(United States) Michael Allen	272	133	1 European Tour win, 1 Nationwide Tour win
T25	(Zimbabwe) Brendon de Jonge	0	0	
T25	(United States) Chris Tidland	39	16	
T25	(United States) Michael Boyd	0	0	
T29	(South Africa) Jaco van Zyl	0	0	1 Sunshine Tour win
T29	(United States) D. J. Brigman	53	24	1 Nationwide Tour win
T29	(United States) Jonathan Kaye	285	178	2 PGA Tour wins
T29	(United States) Bob May	148	84	1 European Tour win
T29	(United States) Dicky Pride	311	130	1 PGA Tour win
T29	(United States) Michael Bradley	253	140	2 PGA Tour wins
T29	(Australia) Stephen Allan	148	74	1 European Tour win, 1 PGA Tour of Australasia win
T29	(United States) Jason Schultz	29	10	1 Nationwide Tour win
T29	(United States) Kyle Reifers	1	0	1 Nationwide Tour win
T29	(United States) Matt Hendrix	4	2	
T29	(United States) Mark Wilson	106	55	
T29	(United States) Brian Bateman	142	72	1 Nationwide Tour win

== 2007 Results ==
Player	Starts	Cuts made	Best finish	Money list rank	Earnings ($)
(United States) George McNeill*	30	18	Win	61	1,504,627
(United States) Robert Garrigus	28	18	T3	74	1,260,010
(United States) Rich Barcelo	26	13	T4	170	334,244
(Denmark) Anders Hansen*	17	10	T11	153	461,216
(United States) John Merrick*	29	16	T4	135	649,438
(United States) Cameron Beckman	29	19	T3	112	902,258
(United States) Steve Wheatcroft*	25	10	T18	206	153,246
(United States) Steve Marino*	31	21	T6	80	1,179,165
(United States) Paul Stankowski	18	7	T12	178	282,389
(United States) Tom Johnson*	27	11	T18	196	190,926
(United States) Bob Heintz	27	15	T5 (twice)	136	649,342
(Australia) Paul Gow	26	10	T10	184	264,149
(United States) Ryan Armour*	32	21	4	121	862,979
(United States) John Mallinger*	29	18	3/T3 (three times)	51	1,681,764
(United States) Anthony Kim*	26	20	T3	60	1,545,195
(United States) Chris Stroud*	24	9	T5	133	673,106
(South Korea) Charlie Wi	27	18	T2	84	1,145,975
(South Africa) Craig Lile*	24	15	T22	186	255,659
(United States) Parker McLachlin*	27	13	T5	137	627,582
(United States) Glen Day	27	16	T15	163	397,491
(United States) Darron Stiles	24	8	T22	192	215,379
(United States) Marco Dawson	23	13	T5	145	521,432
(Germany) Alex Čejka	25	17	T6	120	868,303
(United States) Scott Gutschewski	22	11	T22	187	252,179
(United States) Michael Allen	22	15	2	95	1,016,952
(Zimbabwe) Brendon de Jonge*	26	12	T6	155	447,172
(United States) Chris Tidland	21	8	T6	169	339,482
(United States) Michael Boyd*	21	9	T27	208	126,839
(South Africa) Jaco van Zyl*	21	4	T33	227	53,763
(United States) D. J. Brigman	22	11	T20	183	268,205
(United States) Jonathan Kaye	0	0	n/a	n/a	0
(United States) Bob May	16	9	T5	189	244,970
(United States) Dicky Pride	25	10	4	159	415,792
(United States) Michael Bradley	8	3	T46	237	31,889
(Australia) Stephen Allan	18	13	T7	141	568,059
(United States) Jason Schultz	22	9	T28	203	163,244
(United States) Kyle Reifers*	27	9	T12	181	276,369
(United States) Matt Hendrix*	24	7	T31	213	108,269
(United States) Mark Wilson	25	18	Win	56	1,637,112
(United States) Brian Bateman	18	9	Win	94	1,022,763

*PGA Tour rookie in 2007
T = Tied
Green background indicates the player retained his PGA Tour card for 2008 (finished inside the top 125).
Yellow background indicates the player did not retain his PGA Tour card for 2008, but retained conditional status (finished between 126-150).
Red background indicates the player did not retain his PGA Tour card for 2008 (finished outside the top 150).

== Winners on the PGA Tour in 2007 ==
No.	Date	Player	Tournament	Winning score	Margin of victory	Runner(s)-up
1	Mar 5	(United States) Mark Wilson	Honda Classic	−5 (72-66-66-71=275)	Playoff	(Argentina) José Cóceres (Colombia) Camilo Villegas (United States) Boo Weekley
2	Jul 1	(United States) Brian Bateman	Buick Open	−15 (65-70-69-69 = 273)	1 stroke	(United States) Woody Austin (United States) Jason Gore (United States) Justin Leonard
3	Oct 14	(United States) George McNeill	Justin Timberlake; Shriners Hospitals for Children Open	−24 (66-64-67-67 = 264)	4 strokes	(United States) D. J. Trahan

== Runners-up on the PGA Tour in 2007 ==
No.	Date	Player	Tournament	Winner	Winning score	Runner-up score
1	Jul 22	(South Korea) Charlie Wi	U.S. Bank Championship in Milwaukee	(United States) Joe Ogilvie	−14 (67-63-69-67=266)	−10 (70-66-66-68=270)
2	Sep 23	(United States) Michael Allen	Turning Stone Resort Championship	(United States) Steve Flesch	−18 (66-65-66-73=270)	−16 (69-67-68-68=272)

== See also ==
- 2006 Nationwide Tour graduates
