= Kyle Reifers =

American professional golfer (born 1983)

Personal information
- Nationality: United States
- Born: October 13, 1983 (age 43) Columbus, Ohio, U.S.
- Height: 6 ft 2 in (1.88 m)
- Weight: 175 lb (79 kg; 12.5 st)

Career
- Sport: Golf
- College: Wake Forest University
- Turned professional: 2006
- Former tours: PGA Tour; Korn Ferry Tour
- Professional wins: 3

Number of wins by tour
- Korn Ferry Tour: 1
- Other: 2

Best results in major championships
- Masters Tournament: DNP
- PGA Championship: T22: 2016
- U.S. Open: DNP
- The Open Championship: DNP

Kyle Reifers (born October 13, 1983) is an American professional golfer who plays on the Korn Ferry Tour.

== Amateur career ==
Reifers was born in Columbus, Ohio and played college golf at Wake Forest University. He won the Monroe Invitational and Ohio Amateur in 2004 and the Northeast Amateur in 2005. Reifers represented the United States at the 2005 Walker Cup where the US won 12 1/2–11 1/2. He was the runner-up at the 2006 NCAA Division I Men's Golf Championships.

== Professional career ==
Reifers turned professional in 2006. He picked up his first professional victory on the Egolf Tarheel Tour at the Charlotte National Open only one week after his runner-up finish at the NCAA Men's Golf Championships. He picked up his second professional victory the following week at the Chattanooga Classic on the Nationwide Tour. He became the 11th player in Tour history to win his first career start and the 19th to win on Tour as a Monday qualifier. He earned his PGA Tour card for 2007 by finish T29 in qualifying school in 2006. In his rookie season on tour he made 9 of 27 cuts. He played on the Nationwide Tour/Web.com Tour in 2006, 2008–11, and 2013–14. He played on the PGA Tour in 2007, 2012, and 2015. In 2015, Reifers had three eagles on the back nine in the final round of the Barracuda Championship to shoot for 22 points and tie the leader, J. J. Henry. Reifers lost the playoff to Henry's eagle on the second playoff hole.

== Personal life ==
Reifers father, Randy, played golf at DePauw University and was inducted into the Ohio Golf Hall of Fame. Both his father and mother, Alison, have won Ohio State Amateur tournaments. His father played on the same college golf team as former Vice President Dan Quayle and golf analyst Mark Rolfing.

== Amateur wins ==
- 2004 Monroe Invitational, Ohio Amateur
- 2005 Northeast Amateur

== Professional wins (3) ==
=== Nationwide Tour wins (1) ===
No.	Date	Tournament	Winning score	To par	Margin of victory	Runner-up
1	May 25, 2006	Chattanooga Classic	67-69-65-61=262	−26	Playoff	(United States) Brandt Snedeker

Nationwide Tour playoff record (1–0)

No.	Year	Tournament	Opponent	Result
1	2006	Chattanooga Classic	(United States) Brandt Snedeker	Won with birdie on first extra hole

=== Tarheel Tour wins (1) ===
No.	Date	Tournament	Winning score	Margin of victory	Runners-up
1	Jun 16, 2006	Charlotte National Open	−13 (67-64=131)	2 strokes	(United States) Chris Mundorf, (United States) Derek Watson

=== Other wins (1) ===
No.	Date	Tournament	Winning score	To par	Margin of victory	Runner-up
1	Nov 22, 2020	TaylorMade Pebble Beach Invitational	70-68-69-68=275	−13	3 strokes	(United States) Kirk Triplett

== Playoff record ==
PGA Tour playoff record (0–1)

No.	Year	Tournament	Opponent	Result
1	2015	Barracuda Championship	(United States) J. J. Henry	Lost to eagle on second extra hole

== U.S. national team appearances ==
Amateur

- Walker Cup: 2005 (winners)

== See also ==
- 2006 PGA Tour Qualifying School graduates
- 2011 Nationwide Tour graduates
- 2014 Web.com Tour Finals graduates
