= Jason Schultz (golfer) =

American professional golfer

Personal information
- Nationality: United States
- Born: March 29, 1973 (age 53) Tampa, Florida, U.S.
- Height: 5 ft 10 in (1.78 m)
- Weight: 180 lb (82 kg; 13 st)

Career
- Sport: Golf
- College: University of Missouri
- Turned professional: 1996
- Former tours: PGA Tour; Nationwide Tour; Canadian Tour
- Professional wins: 1

Number of wins by tour
- Korn Ferry Tour: 1

Jason Schultz (born March 29, 1973) is an American professional golfer.

== Early life and amateur career ==
In 1973, Schultz was born in Tampa, Florida. He played college golf at the University of Missouri.

== Professional career ==
Schultz played on the Nationwide Tour in 1999, 2001, 2003–05, and 2008–11. His best finish was a win at the 2005 Chattanooga Classic. He played on the Canadian Tour in 2002. He played on the PGA Tour in 2006 and 2007 where his best finish was T-24 at the 2006 B.C. Open.

== Professional wins (1) ==
=== Nationwide Tour wins (1) ===
No.	Date	Tournament	Winning score	Margin of victory	Runner-up
1	May 5, 2005	Chattanooga Classic	−22 (68-65-66-67=266)	Playoff	(United States) Joe Daley, (United States) Jerry Smith, (United States) Scott Weatherly

Nationwide Tour playoff record (1–0)

No.	Year	Tournament	Opponents	Result
1	2005	Chattanooga Classic	(United States) Joe Daley, (United States) Jerry Smith, (United States) Scott Weatherly	Won with birdie on sixth extra hole Smith and Weatherly eliminated by birdie on first hole

== See also ==
- 2005 Nationwide Tour graduates
- 2006 PGA Tour Qualifying School graduates
