= Austin Open =

Golf tournament

Nike Greater Austin Open
Tournament information
- Location: Austin, Texas
- Established: 1997
- Course: The Hills Country Club
- Par: 72
- Tour: Nike Tour
- Format: Stroke play
- Prize fund: $225,000
- Month played: February
- Final year: 1998

Tournament record score
- Aggregate: 280 Michael Allen (1998)
- To par: −8 as above

Final champion
- (United States) Michael Allen
- Location in the United States Location in Texas

The Austin Open was a golf tournament on the Nike Tour. It ran from 1997 to 1998 and was played at The Hills Country Club in Austin, Texas.

Eric Booker won the inaugural event that was rain-shortened to 36 holes. Michael Allen won the second and final event.

== Winners ==
| Year | Winner | Score | To par | Margin of victory | Runner(s)-up | Ref |
Nike Greater Austin Open
| 1997 | (United States) Eric Booker | 140 (Note: Shortened to 36 holes due to rain.) | −4 | 1 stroke | (United States) Brian Kamm | |
| 1998 | (United States) Michael Allen | 280 | −8 | 2 strokes | (United States) Gene Sauers (United States) Chris Zarmon | |

== See also ==
- Austin Civitan Open, a 1962 LPGA Tour event
