= Nick Flanagan =

Australian professional golfer (born 1984)

Personal information
- Full name: Nicholas Flanagan
- Nationality: Australia
- Born: 13 June 1984 (age 42) Belmont, New South Wales, Australia
- Height: 5 ft 10 in (1.78 m)
- Weight: 145 lb (66 kg; 10.4 st)

Career
- Sport: Golf
- Turned professional: 2004
- Current tour: PGA Tour of Australasia
- Former tours: PGA Tour; Web.com Tour
- Professional wins: 7

Number of wins by tour
- Korn Ferry Tour: 4
- Other: 3

Best results in major championships
- Masters Tournament: CUT: 2004
- PGA Championship: DNP
- U.S. Open: CUT: 2004, 2017
- The Open Championship: T23: 2005

Achievements and awards
- Nationwide Tour Player of the Year: 2007

Nicholas Flanagan (born 13 June 1984) is an Australian professional golfer.

== Early life and amateur career ==
Flanagan was born in Belmont, New South Wales. He won the 2003 U.S. Amateur, the first non-American winner since 1971. He was awarded the 2003 Australian Young Male Athlete of the Year.

== Professional career ==
In 2004, Flanagan turned professional. He currently plays on the Nationwide Tour. He achieved his first professional win at the 2005 Queensland Masters, which is part of the PGA Tour of Australasia's developmental series known as the Von Nida Tour.

In 2007, Flanagan won back-to-back starts on the Nationwide Tour, the Henrico County Open and the BMW Charity Pro-Am at The Cliffs. A third win later that year at the Xerox Classic, gave Flanagan an automatic "battlefield promotion" to the PGA Tour. Flanagan recorded two top 20 finishes in his first two starts on the PGA Tour as an official member. He finished tied for 18th and tied for 17th in two Fall Series events. He was voted the 2007 Nationwide Tour Player of the Year. Flanagan's first full year on the PGA Tour was in 2008, where he finished 169th. His finish was not good enough to retain his tour card and he returned to the Nationwide Tour for 2009.

== Amateur wins ==
- 2002 R/UP Australian Junior Championship, Under 19 New Zealand Amateur Championship at Ashburton Golf Club
- 2003 U.S. Amateur, Pacific Northwest Amateur

== Professional wins (7) ==
=== Web.com Tour wins (4) ===
No.	Date	Tournament	Winning score	Margin of victory	Runner(s)-up
1	29 Apr 2007	Henrico County Open	−13 (70-66-69-70=275)	Playoff	(Canada) Chris Baryla, (Canada) Bryn Parry, (United States) Roland Thatcher
2	20 May 2007	BMW Charity Pro-Am	−15 (68-72-66-65=271)	1 stroke	(United States) Nicholas Thompson
3	19 Aug 2007	Xerox Classic	−10 (69-68-70-63=270)	1 stroke	(United States) James Driscoll
4	20 May 2012	BMW Charity Pro-Am (2)	−15 (67-70-67-67=271)	Playoff	(Australia) Cameron Percy

Web.com Tour playoff record (2–0)

No.	Year	Tournament	Opponent(s)	Result
1	2007	Henrico County Open	(Canada) Chris Baryla, (Canada) Bryn Parry, (United States) Roland Thatcher	Won with birdie on third extra hole Thatcher eliminated by par on second hole Parry eliminated by birdie on first hole
2	2012	BMW Charity Pro-Am	(Australia) Cameron Percy	Won with par on third extra hole

=== Von Nida Tour wins (1) ===
No.	Date	Tournament	Winning score	Margin of victory	Runners-up
1	30 Oct 2005	Minniecon & Burke Queensland Masters	−15 (70-68-65-66=269)	4 strokes	(Australia) Brad Andrews, (Australia) Troy Kennedy, (Australia) Leigh McKechnie

=== Other wins (2) ===
- 2003 Tasmanian Open (as an amateur)
- 2022 Cathedral Invitational

== Results in major championships ==
Tournament	2004	2005	2006	2007	2008	2009
Masters Tournament	CUT					
U.S. Open	CUT					
The Open Championship	CUT	T23				
PGA Championship						

Tournament	2010	2011	2012	2013	2014	2015	2016	2017
Masters Tournament								
U.S. Open								CUT
The Open Championship								
PGA Championship								

Did not play

CUT = missed the half-way cut
"T" = tied

== Team appearances ==
Amateur

- Nomura Cup (representing Australia): 2003 (winners)
- Bonallack Trophy (representing Asia/Pacific): 2004 (winners)
- Australian Men's Interstate Teams Matches (representing New South Wales): 2003

== See also ==
- 2007 Nationwide Tour graduates
- List of golfers with most Web.com Tour wins
