= Bo Van Pelt =

American professional golfer (born 1975)

Personal information
- Nationality: United States
- Born: May 16, 1975 (age 51) Richmond, Indiana, U.S.
- Height: 6 ft 4 in (1.93 m)
- Weight: 200 lb (91 kg; 14 st)
- Spouse: Carrie Van Pelt
- Children: 3

Career
- Sport: Golf
- College: Oklahoma State University
- Turned professional: 1998
- Current tours: PGA Tour Champions; European Senior Tour
- Former tours: PGA Tour; Nationwide Tour
- Professional wins: 7
- Highest ranking: 20 (October 28, 2012)

Number of wins by tour
- PGA Tour: 1
- European Tour: 1
- Asian Tour: 1
- PGA Tour of Australasia: 1
- Korn Ferry Tour: 1
- European Senior Tour: 1
- Other: 2

Best results in major championships
- Masters Tournament: T8: 2011
- PGA Championship: T17: 2005
- U.S. Open: T14: 2011
- The Open Championship: T30: 2004

Bo Van Pelt (born May 16, 1975) is an American professional golfer who has played on both the Nationwide Tour and the PGA Tour, and currently competing on the PGA Tour Champions. He has featured in the top 20 of the Official World Golf Ranking.

== Early life and education ==
Van Pelt was born in Richmond, Indiana. His father, Bob, was selected in the fifth round of the 1967 NFL/AFL draft by the Philadelphia Eagles after a collegiate football career as a center at Indiana University.

Van Pelt graduated from Richmond High where he was a two time All-State golfer and the 1993 Fred Keesling Award winner. He attended Oklahoma State University, where he was a member of the Sigma Chi fraternity.

== Professional career ==
Van Pelt began his golf career on the Nationwide Tour. He won the Omaha Classic, his first and only Nationwide Tour title, in 2003 after shooting a final round of 62. On the PGA Tour, he won his maiden victory in 2009 at the U.S. Bank Championship in Milwaukee, beating John Mallinger in a sudden death playoff on the second extra hole.

In 2011, Van Pelt won the CIMB Asia Pacific Classic Malaysia, an Asian Tour event and an unofficial PGA Tour event. He carded a final round seven under 64 to romp to a six stroke victory and finish at 23 under par. On April 8, 2012, he scored a tournament low 64 in the 2012 Masters Tournament, propelling him up the leaderboard to a final tie for 17th place.

Van Pelt claimed his first victory on the European Tour in October 2012, when he won in Australia at the ISPS Handa Perth International. He defeated Jason Dufner by two strokes.

On June 13, 2021, Van Pelt finished joint runner-up one stroke behind Garrick Higgo in the Palmetto Championship. The finish marked his biggest payday on Tour as well as the best finish in nearly nine years for Van Pelt, who spent the season between 2016 and 2019 idle due to shoulder injuries.

Van Pelt reached age 50 on May 16, 2025, making him eligible for Senior tournaments. In August, he won the Legends Tour's flagship event, the Staysure PGA Seniors Championship.

== Amateur wins ==
- 1991 Indiana (Boys) State Junior
- 1993 Indiana (Boys) State Junior
- 1995 Northern Amateur, Missouri Bluffs Intercollegiate
- 1997 John Burns Intercollegiate, NCAA Central Regional Championship

== Professional wins (7) ==
=== PGA Tour wins (1) ===
No.	Date	Tournament	Winning score	Margin of victory	Runner-up
1	Jul 19, 2009	U.S. Bank Championship in Milwaukee	−13 (67-68-68-64=267)	Playoff	(United States) John Mallinger

PGA Tour playoff record (1–0)

No.	Year	Tournament	Opponent	Result
1	2009	U.S. Bank Championship in Milwaukee	(United States) John Mallinger	Won with birdie on second extra hole

=== European Tour wins (1) ===
No.	Date	Tournament	Winning score	Margin of victory	Runner-up
1	Oct 21, 2012	ISPS Handa Perth International^{1}	−16 (70-67-67-68=272)	2 strokes	(United States) Jason Dufner

^{1}Co-sanctioned by the PGA Tour of Australasia

=== Asian Tour wins (1) ===
No.	Date	Tournament	Winning score	Margin of victory	Runner-up
1	Oct 30, 2011	CIMB Asia Pacific Classic Malaysia^{1}	−23 (66-64-67-64=261)	6 strokes	(United States) Jeff Overton

^{1}Co-sanctioned by the PGA Tour, but unofficial event on that tour.

=== Nationwide Tour wins (1) ===
No.	Date	Tournament	Winning score	Margin of victory	Runner-up
1	Aug 10, 2003	Omaha Classic	−26 (64-67-69-62=262)	2 strokes	(South Africa) Craig Lile

Nationwide Tour playoff record (0–1)

No.	Year	Tournament	Opponents	Result
1	2001	Buy.com Gila River Classic	(United States) Jason Caron, (United States) Ben Crane	Crane won with birdie on fourth extra hole Caron eliminated by par on second hole

=== Other wins (2) ===
No.	Date	Tournament	Winning score	Margin of victory	Runners-up
1	Jun 25, 2013	CVS Caremark Charity Classic (with (United States) Steve Stricker)	−25 (59-58=117)	4 strokes	(United States) Billy Andrade and (United States) Bill Haas
2	Jun 24, 2014	CVS Caremark Charity Classic (2) (with (United States) Steve Stricker)	−20 (62-60=122)	1 stroke	(United States) Peter Jacobsen and (United States) Jimmy Walker

=== European Senior Tour wins (1) ===
No.	Date	Tournament	Winning score	Margin of victory	Runner-up
1	Aug 3, 2025	Staysure PGA Seniors Championship	−3 (74-72-68-71=285)	Playoff	(South Africa) Darren Fichardt

European Senior Tour playoff record (1–0)

No.	Year	Tournament	Opponent	Result
1	2025	Staysure PGA Seniors Championship	(South Africa) Darren Fichardt	Won with birdie on first extra hole

== Results in major championships ==
Tournament	2004	2005	2006	2007	2008	2009
Masters Tournament		CUT				
U.S. Open	T31		T40			CUT
The Open Championship	T30	T52	CUT			
PGA Championship	T31	T17		CUT		CUT

Tournament	2010	2011	2012	2013	2014	2015
Masters Tournament		T8	T17	T20		
U.S. Open	T40	T14	T59	T21	T63	CUT
The Open Championship	T44	T57	CUT	T44		
PGA Championship	T28	CUT	T18	WD		

Top 10
Did not play

WD = withdrew
CUT = missed the half-way cut
"T" = tied

=== Summary ===
Tournament	Wins	2nd	3rd	Top-5	Top-10	Top-25	Events	Cuts made
Masters Tournament	0	0	0	0	1	3	4	3
U.S. Open	0	0	0	0	0	2	9	7
The Open Championship	0	0	0	0	0	0	7	5
PGA Championship	0	0	0	0	0	2	8	4
Totals	0	0	0	0	1	7	28	19

- Most consecutive cuts made – 6 (2010 U.S. Open – 2011 Open Championship)
- Longest streak of top-10s – 1

== Results in The Players Championship ==
Tournament	2005	2006	2007	2008	2009	2010	2011	2012	2013	2014	2015
The Players Championship	CUT	T8	CUT	CUT	CUT	T4	CUT	T7	T62	T26	T30

Top 10

CUT = missed the halfway cut
"T" indicates a tie for a place

== Results in World Golf Championships ==
Tournament	2010	2011	2012	2013
Match Play		R32	R64	R32
Championship		T35	T8	T39
Invitational	T3	T23	T8	T21
Champions		T11		T21

Top 10
Did not play

QF, R16, R32, R64 = Round in which player lost in match play
"T" = Tied

== U.S. national team appearances ==
Amateur

- Palmer Cup: 1997 (winners)

== See also ==
- 1998 PGA Tour Qualifying School graduates
- 2001 Buy.com Tour graduates
- 2003 Nationwide Tour graduates
