= Notah Begay III =

American professional golfer (born 1972)

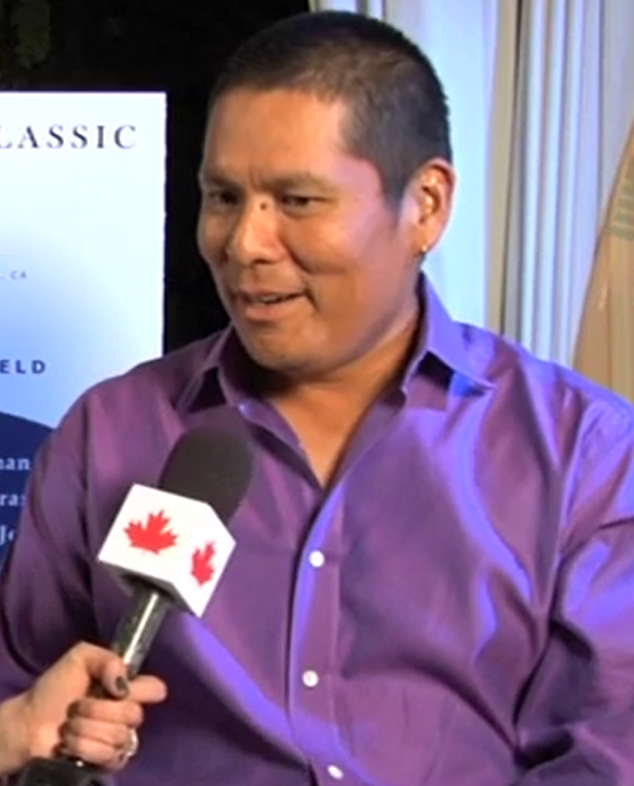
- Begay in 2011

Personal information
- Full name: Notah Ryan Begay III
- Nationality: United States
- Born: September 14, 1972 (age 54) Albuquerque, New Mexico, U.S.
- Height: 5 ft 11 in (1.80 m)
- Weight: 195 lb (88 kg; 13.9 st)

Career
- Sport: Golf
- College: Stanford University
- Turned professional: 1995
- Current tour: PGA Tour Champions
- Former tours: PGA Tour; Nationwide Tour; European Tour
- Professional wins: 5
- Highest ranking: 19 (August 20, 2000)

Number of wins by tour
- PGA Tour: 4
- Other: 1

Best results in major championships
- Masters Tournament: T37: 2000
- PGA Championship: 8th: 2000
- U.S. Open: 22nd: 2000
- The Open Championship: T20: 2000

Achievements and awards
- Payne Stewart Award: 2026

Notah Ryan Begay III (born September 14, 1972) is an American professional golfer. He is one of the few Native American golfers to have played in the PGA Tour. Since 2013, Begay has served as an analyst with the Golf Channel and NBC Sports.

== Early life and amateur career ==
Begay was born and raised in Albuquerque, New Mexico. Begay is a Native American of the Navajo, San Felipe, and Isleta people. His first name in the Navajo language means "almost there." His grandfather, Notah Begay, was a code talker. In 1990, he graduated from a private high school, Albuquerque Academy.

Begay attended Stanford University, where he was a three-time All-American, a teammate of Tiger Woods, and played on the 1994 NCAA Division I Men's Golf Championship team. He was a member of the Sigma Chi Fraternity (Alpha Omega chapter) and earned a Bachelor of Science degree in Economics in 1995.

== Professional career ==
=== Nike Tour ===
In 1995, Begay turned professional. In 1998, Begay shot a 59 in the second round of the Nike Tour Dominion Open, to join the few golfers to ever shoot a 59 in a professional tournament. He placed 10th on the Nike Tour money list that year, earning a place on the PGA Tour for 1999.

=== PGA Tour ===
Begay had a pair of wins in each of his first two seasons on the Tour. From late September 1999 to early July 2000, a period of just over nine months, Begay recorded four PGA Tour wins, with the third and fourth wins coming in successive weeks. Since then, he was plagued by back trouble which put his future as a professional golfer in doubt. In 2005, he played under a "Major Medical Exemption" with little success. In 2006, he played on the Nationwide Tour. At the end of 2006, he successfully earned a card for the European Tour from their qualifying school. In December 2008, he regained his playing card for the 2009 PGA Tour season at Q-school.

Begay has been featured in the top 20 of the Official World Golf Rankings. He successfully utilized a unique putting method. Using a putter with playing faces on both the front and back of the head, he putted right-to-left-breaking putts right-handed, and left-to-right-breaking putts left-handed. Begay is the first top player to use such a technique and putter.

== Personal life ==
On January 19, 2000, Begay was arrested for what he admitted, in court, was actually his second DUI incident. He was sentenced later that month to 364 days in jail with all but seven days suspended.

Begay suffered a heart attack in 2014, while practicing on the putting green at Dallas National Golf Club. He was quickly taken by ambulance to Dallas' Methodist Hospital and a stent was placed in his right coronary artery.

Begay is the uncle of Madison Hammond, who in 2020 became the first Native American soccer player to play in the National Women's Soccer League. Hammond cited Begay as one of her inspirations.

== Businesses and Organizations ==
=== NB3 Consulting ===
In 2002, Begay founded NB3 Consulting, which consults with tribal communities looking to build golf courses for the purpose of economic development. Notable courses the company has built includes Sequoyah National, Firekeeper Golf Course, and Sewailo Golf Club.

=== Notah Begay III Foundation ===
In 2005, Begay established the non-profit Notah Begay III Foundation. The immediate goal of the foundation was to provide health and wellness education to Native American youth in the form of soccer and golf programs. The broader purpose of the foundation was to stand as a catalyst for change in the Native American community. On August 26, 2008, the foundation hosted the first Notah Begay III Foundation Challenge at the Turning Stone Resort & Casino, a skins golf match to raise money for the foundation. The five players for the tournament were Begay, Stewart Cink, Vijay Singh, Camilo Villegas and Mike Weir. On August 24, 2009, the foundation hosted its second annual Notah Begay III Foundation Challenge at the Turning Stone Resort & Casino.

=== KivaSun Foods ===
In 2010, Begay founded KivaSun Foods, selling various bison-based products. In 2015, the company won a contract to have 520,000 pounds of bison distributed through the Food Distribution Program on Indian Reservations.

== Awards and honors ==
- Begay was named one of Golf Magazine's Innovators of the Year in 2009
- He has also been named one of the Top 100 Sports Educators in the world by the Institute for International Sport
- Begay was named the recipient of the 2026 Payne Stewart Award presented by Southern Company, honoring his character, sportsmanship and commitment to charitable giving.

== Amateur wins (1) ==
this list may be incomplete

- 1995 Northeast Amateur

== Professional wins (5) ==
=== PGA Tour wins (4) ===
No.	Date	Tournament	Winning score	Margin of victory	Runner(s)-up
1	Aug 29, 1999	Reno–Tahoe Open	−14 (70-69-63-72=274)	3 strokes	(United States) Chris Perry, (United States) David Toms
2	Oct 10, 1999	Michelob Championship at Kingsmill	−10 (67-70-69-68=274)	Playoff	(United States) Tom Byrum
3	Jun 25, 2000	FedEx St. Jude Classic	−13 (66-69-67-69=271)	1 stroke	(United States) Chris DiMarco, (United States) Bob May
4	Jul 2, 2000	Canon Greater Hartford Open	−20 (64-65-67-64=260)	1 stroke	(United States) Mark Calcavecchia

PGA Tour playoff record (1–0)

No.	Year	Tournament	Opponent	Result
1	1999	Michelob Championship at Kingsmill	(United States) Tom Byrum	Won with par on second extra hole

=== Other wins (1) ===
- 1998 New Mexico Open

== Playoff record ==
Nike Tour playoff record (0–1)

No.	Year	Tournament	Opponent	Result
1	1998	Nike Lehigh Valley Open	(United States) Eric Booker	Lost to birdie on ninth extra hole

== Results in major championships ==
Tournament	1999	2000	2001
Masters Tournament		T37	CUT
U.S. Open	CUT	22	CUT
The Open Championship		T20	
PGA Championship		8	CUT

Top 10
Did not play

CUT = missed the half-way cut
"T" = tied

=== Summary ===
Tournament	Wins	2nd	3rd	Top-5	Top-10	Top-25	Events	Cuts made
Masters Tournament	0	0	0	0	0	0	2	1
U.S. Open	0	0	0	0	0	1	3	1
The Open Championship	0	0	0	0	0	1	1	1
PGA Championship	0	0	0	0	1	1	2	1
Totals	0	0	0	0	1	3	8	4

- Most consecutive cuts made – 4 (2000 Masters – 2000 PGA)
- Longest streak of top-10s – 1

== Results in The Players Championship ==
Tournament	2000	2001	2002	2003	2004
The Players Championship	CUT	CUT	CUT	T56	CUT

CUT = missed the halfway cut
"T" indicates a tie for a place

== Results in World Golf Championships ==
Tournament	1999	2000	2001	2002
Match Play				
Championship	T46		NT^{1}	
Invitational		T17	T31	T52

^{1}Cancelled due to 9/11

Did not play

"T" = Tied
NT = No tournament

== U.S. national team appearances ==
Amateur

- Walker Cup: 1995

Professional

- Presidents Cup: 2000 (winners)
- Wendy's 3-Tour Challenge (representing PGA Tour): 2000 (winners)

== See also ==
- 1998 Nike Tour graduates
- 2006 European Tour Qualifying School graduates
- 2008 PGA Tour Qualifying School graduates
- Lowest rounds of golf
