= Andrew Johnson (golfer) =

American professional golfer (born 1972)

Personal information
- Nationality: United States
- Born: January 10, 1972 (age 54) Columbus, Indiana, U.S.
- Height: 5 ft 11 in (1.80 m)
- Weight: 160 lb (73 kg; 11 st)

Career
- Sport: Golf
- College: Ball State University
- Turned professional: 1995
- Former tours: Canadian Tour; Challenge Tour; Nationwide Tour
- Professional wins: 1

Number of wins by tour
- Korn Ferry Tour: 1

Andrew Johnson (born January 10, 1972) is an American professional golfer.

== Career ==
Johnson was born in Columbus, Indiana. He played college golf at Ball State University and turned professional in 1995.

Johnson played on the Canadian Tour from 2000 to 2004, the Challenge Tour in 2003 and the Nationwide Tour from 2005 to 2009. His best finish is a win at the 2005 Cleveland Open on the Nationwide Tour.

== Professional wins (1) ==
=== Nationwide Tour wins (1) ===
No.	Date	Tournament	Winning score	Margin of victory	Runner-up
1	Aug 28, 2005	Cleveland Open	−14 (73-68-62-67=270)	3 strokes	(United States) Keoke Cotner
