= 2005 Nationwide Tour =

Golf tour season

2005 Nationwide Tour season
- Duration: January 27, 2005 – October 30, 2005
- Number of official events: 30 (Note: One further tournament was scheduled but was canceled.)
- Most wins: (United States) Jason Gore (3)
- Money list: (United States) Troy Matteson
- Player of the Year: (United States) Jason Gore

The 2005 Nationwide Tour was the 16th season of the Nationwide Tour, the official development tour to the PGA Tour.

== Schedule ==
The following table lists official events during the 2005 season.

Date	Tournament	Location	Purse (US$)	Winner (Note: The number in parentheses after each winner's name is the number of Nationwide Tour events they had won up to and including that tournament. This information is only shown for Nationwide Tour members. It is rare for someone to accumulate many wins on the Nationwide Tour as success at this level usually leads to promotion to the PGA Tour.)	OWGR points	Other tours (Note: ANZ − PGA Tour of Australasia.)	Notes
Jan 30	BellSouth Panama Championship	Panama	525,000	(United States) Vance Veazey (3)	6		
Feb 20	Jacob's Creek Open Championship	Australia	A$1,000,000	(Australia) Steven Bowditch (1)	12	ANZ	
Feb 27	ING New Zealand PGA Championship	New Zealand	600,000	(Australia) Peter O'Malley (n/a)	12	ANZ	
Mar 27	Chitimacha Louisiana Open	Louisiana	500,000	(United States) Ryan Hietala (1)	6		
Apr 24	Virginia Beach Open	Virginia	450,000	(United States) Troy Matteson (1)	6		
May 1	BMW Charity Pro-Am	South Carolina	625,000	(United States) Shane Bertsch (2)	6		Pro-Am
May 8	Rex Hospital Open	North Carolina	450,000	(United States) Eric Axley (1)	6		
May 15	Rheem Classic	Arkansas	475,000	(United States) Chris Couch (4)	6		
May 22	Henrico County Open	Virginia	450,000	(United States) Chad Collins (1)	6		
Jun 5	Chattanooga Classic	Tennessee	450,000	(United States) Jason Schultz (1)	6		
Jun 12	LaSalle Bank Open	Illinois	750,000	(United States) Chris Couch (5)	6		
Jun 19	Knoxville Open	Tennessee	475,000	(Australia) Kim Felton (1)	6		
Jun 26	Northeast Pennsylvania Classic	Pennsylvania	450,000	(United States) Greg Kraft (1)	6		
Jul 3	Lake Erie Charity Classic	New York	450,000	(Mexico) Esteban Toledo (1)	6		
Jul 10	National Mining Association Pete Dye Classic	West Virginia	600,000	(United States) Jason Gore (4)	6		
Jul 17	Scholarship America Showdown	Wisconsin	525,000	(United States) Jason Gore (5)	6		
Jul 24	Canadian PGA Championship	Canada	450,000	(Canada) Jon Mills (1)	6		
Jul 31	Preferred Health Systems Wichita Open	Kansas	475,000	(United States) Joe Daley (2)	6		
Aug 7	Cox Classic	Nebraska	625,000	(United States) Jason Gore (6) (Note: Gore earned immediate promotion to the PGA Tour, as this was his third win of the season.)	6		
Aug 14	Price Cutter Charity Championship	Missouri	550,000	(United States) Roger Tambellini (2)	6		
Aug 21	Xerox Classic	New York	550,000	(United States) Rick Price (1)	6		New tournament
Aug 28	Cleveland Open	Ohio	450,000	(United States) Andrew Johnson (1)	6		New tournament
Sep 4	Alberta Classic	Canada	450,000	(United States) Peter Tomasulo (1)	6		
Sep 11	Envirocare Utah Classic	Utah	475,000	(United States) Garrett Willis (1)	6		
Sep 18	Mark Christopher Charity Classic	California	475,000	(United States) Troy Matteson (2)	6		
Sep 25	Albertsons Boise Open	Idaho	650,000	(Australia) Greg Chalmers (1)	6		
Oct 2	Oregon Classic	Oregon	450,000	(United States) Jeff Gove (3)	6		
Oct 9	Gila River Golf Classic	Arizona	450,000	(Australia) David McKenzie (1)	6		
Oct 16	Permian Basin Charity Golf Classic	Texas	475,000	(United States) Kris Cox (1)	6		
~~Oct 23~~	Miccosukee Championship	Florida	–	Canceled (Note: Canceled due to Hurricane Wilma.)	–		
Oct 30	Nationwide Tour Championship	Alabama	650,000	(United States) David Branshaw (2)	6		Tour Championship

== Money list ==
The money list was based on prize money won during the season, calculated in U.S. dollars. The top 21 players on the money list earned status to play on the 2006 PGA Tour.

Position	Player	Prize money ($)
1	(United States) Troy Matteson	495,009
2	(United States) Jason Gore	356,579
3	(United States) Chris Couch	337,205
4	(Australia) Steven Bowditch	333,329
5	(Canada) Jon Mills	325,806

== Awards ==
Award	Winner	Ref.
Player of the Year (Jack Nicklaus Trophy)	(United States) Jason Gore	
