= Whirlwind Golf Club =

Golf Club in Arizona

- Interactive map of Whirlwind Golf Club
- 33.2696°N 111.9904°W

Club information
- Established: 2000
- Type: Public
- Owner: Gila River Indian Community
- Operator: Century Golf Partners
- Tota holes: 36
- Tournaments: Ford Championship
- Greens: bermuda grass, summer; ryegrass, winter
- Fairways: Bermuda grass
- Website: https://www.whirlwindgolf.com

Whirlwind Golf Club is a golf club and course in Chandler, Arizona. It is known for hosting the Ford Championship on the LPGA tour.

== Background ==
Whirlwind was opened in 2000 and was designed by Gary Panks. The course is sited on the grounds of the Gila River Indian Community, who own the course. Whirlwind includes more than 500 acres of grounds, across two 18-hole courses, "Cattail" and "Devil's Claw".

In 2001 and 2002, the course hosted the Nationwide Tour's Gila River Classic.

In 2011, the facility was named the Troon golf facility of the year, and hosted more than 72,000 rounds of golf. In 2021, the course hosted the "Let Them Play Classic", a consolation tournament of the Baton Rouge, Louisiana NCAA Women's Regional event.

In 2025, the Ford Championship was held at Whirlwind for the first time. The event was held on the club's Cattail course.
