= 2007 Nationwide Tour =

Golf tour season

2007 Nationwide Tour season
- Duration: January 25, 2007 – November 4, 2007
- Number of official events: 32
- Most wins: (Australia) Nick Flanagan (3)
- Money list: (Wales) Richard Johnson
- Player of the Year: (Australia) Nick Flanagan

The 2007 Nationwide Tour was the 18th season of the Nationwide Tour, the official development tour to the PGA Tour.

== Schedule ==
The following table lists official events during the 2007 season.

Date	Tournament	Location	Purse (US$)	Winner (Note: The number in parentheses after each winner's name is the number of Nationwide Tour events they had won up to and including that tournament. This information is only shown for Nationwide Tour members. It is rare for someone to accumulate many wins on the Nationwide Tour as success at this level usually leads to promotion to the PGA Tour.)	OWGR points	Other tours (Note: ANZ − PGA Tour of Australasia.)	Notes
Jan 28	Movistar Panama Championship	Panama	550,000	(Argentina) Miguel Ángel Carballo (1)	14		
Feb 18	Jacob's Creek Open Championship	Australia	600,000	(United States) Scott Sterling (1)	16	ANZ	
Feb 25	HSBC New Zealand PGA Championship	New Zealand	600,000	(United States) Nicholas Thompson (1)	16	ANZ	
Mar 25	Chitimacha Louisiana Open	Louisiana	500,000	(United States) Skip Kendall (3)	14		
Apr 1	Livermore Valley Wine Country Championship	California	625,000	(United States) Omar Uresti (2)	14		
Apr 15	South Georgia Classic	Georgia	600,000	(United States) John Kimbell (1)	14		New tournament
Apr 22	Athens Regional Foundation Classic	Georgia	500,000	(Scotland) Martin Laird (1)	14		
Apr 29	Henrico County Open	Virginia	450,000	(Australia) Nick Flanagan (1)	14		
May 6	Fort Smith Classic	Arkansas	525,000	(United States) Jay Williamson (1)	14		
May 20	BMW Charity Pro-Am	South Carolina	650,000	(Australia) Nick Flanagan (2)	14		Pro-Am
May 27	Melwood Prince George's County Open	Maryland	600,000	(United States) Paul Claxton (2)	14		New tournament
Jun 3	LaSalle Bank Open	Illinois	750,000	(United States) John Riegger (1)	14		
Jun 10	Rex Hospital Open	North Carolina	450,000	(United States) Kyle Thompson (1)	14		
Jun 17	Rochester Area Charities Showdown	Minnesota	500,000	(United States) Chris Riley (1)	14		
Jun 24	Knoxville Open	Tennessee	475,000	(United States) Chez Reavie (1)	14		
Jul 1	Peek'n Peak Classic	New York	600,000	(United States) Roland Thatcher (2)	14		
Jul 8	Legend Financial Group Classic	Ohio	475,000	(Australia) Jason Day (1)	14		
Jul 15	Nationwide Children's Hospital Invitational	Ohio	600,000	(United States) Daniel Summerhays (a) (1)	14		New tournament
Jul 22	Price Cutter Charity Championship	Missouri	525,000	(United States) Tom Scherrer (3)	14		
Jul 29	Cox Classic	Nebraska	700,000	(United States) Roland Thatcher (3)	14		
Aug 5	Preferred Health Systems Wichita Open	Kansas	550,000	(United States) Brad Elder (3)	14		
Aug 12	Northeast Pennsylvania Classic	Pennsylvania	550,000	(United States) Justin Bolli (2)	14		
Aug 19	Xerox Classic	New York	600,000	(Australia) Nick Flanagan (3) (Note: Flanagan earned immediate promotion to the PGA Tour, as this was his third win of the season.)	14		
Aug 26	National Mining Association Pete Dye Classic	West Virginia	600,000	(United States) Jimmy Walker (3)	14		
Sep 9	Utah EnergySolutions Championship	Utah	500,000	(United States) Franklin Langham (3)	14		
Sep 16	Oregon Classic	Oregon	475,000	(United States) Kyle Thompson (2)	14		
Sep 23	Albertsons Boise Open	Idaho	675,000	(Canada) Jon Mills (2)	14		
Oct 7	Mark Christopher Charity Classic	California	525,000	(Wales) Richard Johnson (3)	14		
Oct 14	WNB Golf Classic	Texas	475,000	(United States) Brad Adamonis (1)	14		
Oct 21	Chattanooga Classic	Tennessee	475,000	(United States) Ron Whittaker (1)	14		
Oct 28	Miccosukee Championship	Florida	575,000	(United States) Marc Turnesa (1)	14		
Nov 4	Nationwide Tour Championship	California	775,000	(Wales) Richard Johnson (4)	20		Tour Championship

== Money list ==
The money list was based on prize money won during the season, calculated in U.S. dollars. The top 25 players on the money list earned status to play on the 2008 PGA Tour.

Position	Player	Prize money ($)
1	(Wales) Richard Johnson	445,421
2	(United States) Roland Thatcher	415,124
3	(Australia) Nick Flanagan	369,951
4	(Canada) Jon Mills	366,244
5	(Australia) Jason Day	331,542

== Awards ==
Award	Winner	Ref.
Player of the Year (Jack Nicklaus Trophy)	(Australia) Nick Flanagan	
