= Rich Barcelo =

American professional golfer (born 1975)

Personal information
- Nationality: United States
- Born: July 12, 1975 (age 51) Long Beach, California, U.S.
- Height: 6 ft 4 in (1.93 m)
- Weight: 180 lb (82 kg; 13 st)
- Spouse: Teresa Barcelo (m. 2004; div. 2014)
- Children: 2

Career
- Sport: Golf
- College: University of Nevada
- Turned professional: 1998
- Former tours: PGA Tour; Web.com Tour
- Professional wins: 2

Number of wins by tour
- Korn Ferry Tour: 1
- Other: 1

Best results in major championships
- Masters Tournament: DNP
- PGA Championship: DNP
- U.S. Open: CUT: 2010
- The Open Championship: CUT: 2005

Rich Barcelo (born July 12, 1975) is an American professional golfer. He played on the PGA Tour and the Web.com Tour.

== Early life ==
Barcelo played in the 1986 Little League World Series as a member of the Tucson team that lost 12-0 to Taiwan in the finals.

== Professional career ==
Barcelo played on the Nationwide Tour in 1999, 2002, 2003, 2005, and 2008-09. He was a member of the PGA Tour in 2004 and 2007. He qualified for the PGA Tour through qualifying school both times. He won his first tournament on a professional golf tour in 2009 at the Cox Classic on the Nationwide Tour. He finished 21st on the money list to earn his 2010 PGA Tour card.

Barcelo now works as director of instruction at Bluejack National Golf Club in Montgomery, Texas.

== Personal life ==
In 2004, Barcelo married Teresa Barcelo. In 2005, he had his first daughter, Milan. And in 2008, he had his second daughter, Macy. They divorced in 2014.

His brother, Marc, played professional baseball in the minors leagues from 1993 to 1997, and is now head golf pro at Doral Golf Resort & Spa in Doral, Florida.

== Professional wins (2) ==
=== Nationwide Tour wins (1) ===
No.	Date	Tournament	Winning score	Margin of victory	Runner-up
1	Jul 26, 2009	Cox Classic	−20 (69-62-68-56=264)	1 stroke	(United States) Tom Gillis

=== Other wins (1) ===
- 2000 California State Open

== Results in major championships ==
Tournament	2005	2006	2007	2008	2009	2010
U.S. Open						CUT
The Open Championship	CUT					

Note: Barcelo never played in the Masters Tournament or the PGA Championship.

Did not play

CUT = missed the half-way cut

== See also ==
- 2003 PGA Tour Qualifying School graduates
- 2006 PGA Tour Qualifying School graduates
- 2009 Nationwide Tour graduates
