= Encompass Championship =

Golf tournament

Coordinates: 42.075°N 87.785°W

Tournament information
- Location: Glenview, Illinois, U.S.
- Established: 2013
- Course: North Shore Country Club
- Par: 72
- Length: 7,103 yards (6,495 m)
- Tour: Champions Tour
- Format: Stroke play – 54 holes (no cut)
- Prize fund: $1.9 million
- Month played: July
- Final year: 2015

Tournament record score
- Aggregate: 200 Jerry Smith (2015)
- To par: −16 Jerry Smith (2015)

Final champion
- (United States) Jerry Smith

Location in the United States

The Encompass Championship was a golf tournament on the Champions Tour. It was played for the first time in 2013 at the North Shore Country Club in Glenview, Illinois.

The purse for the 2013 tournament was $1,800,000, with $270,000 going to the winner.

== Winners ==
Year	Date	Champion	Country	Winning score	Margin	Purse ($)
2015	Jul 12	Jerry Smith	United States	200 (−16)	3 strokes	1,900,000
2014	Jun 22	Tom Lehman	United States	201 (−15)	1 stroke	1,800,000
2013	Jun 23	Craig Stadler	United States	203 (−13)	1 stroke	1,800,000
