= Children's Hospital Classic =

Golf tournament

Tournament information
- Location: Chattanooga, Tennessee
- Established: 2003
- Course: Black Creek Club
- Par: 72
- Length: 7,044 yards (6,441 m)
- Tour: Nationwide Tour
- Format: Stroke play
- Prize fund: US$500,000
- Month played: October
- Final year: 2011

Tournament record score
- Aggregate: 262 Kyle Reifers (2006); 262 Brandt Snedeker (2006)
- To par: −26 as above

Final champion
- (Argentina) Miguel Ángel Carballo
- Location in the United States Location in Tennessee

The Children's Hospital Classic was a golf tournament on the Nationwide Tour. It was played annually at the Black Creek Club in Chattanooga, Tennessee and produced by Friends of the Festival Event Management from 2007 to 2011. From 2003 to 2010 the event was called the Chattanooga Classic.

The 2011 purse was $500,000, with $90,000 going to the winner.

== Winners ==
Year	Winner	Score	To par	Margin of victory	Runner(s)-up
Children's Hospital Classic
2011	(Argentina) Miguel Ángel Carballo	264	−24	2 strokes	(United States) Brice Garnett
Chattanooga Classic
2010	(Australia) Scott Gardiner	269	−19	Playoff	(United States) Joe Affrunti (United States) David Branshaw
2009	(Canada) Chris Baryla	269	−19	1 stroke	(United States) Troy Kelly
2008	(India) Arjun Atwal	264	−24	Playoff	(United States) Webb Simpson
2007	(United States) Ron Whittaker	271	−17	1 stroke	(Australia) David McKenzie
2006	(United States) Kyle Reifers	262	−26	Playoff	(United States) Brandt Snedeker
2005	(United States) Jason Schultz	266	−22	Playoff	(United States) Joe Daley (United States) Jerry Smith (United States) Scott Weatherly
2004	(United States) Justin Bolli	267	−21	1 stroke	(United States) Chris Anderson (United States) Johnson Wagner
2003	(United States) Jason Bohn	265	−23	1 stroke	(United States) Kyle Thompson

== See also ==
- Chattanooga Classic (PGA Tour), a PGA Tour event played from 1983 to 1992
