= Ford Championship =

Women's professional golf tournament

Tournament information
- Location: Chandler, Arizona, U.S.
- Established: 2024
- Course: Whirlwind Golf Club
- Par: 72
- Length: 6,661 yards (6,091 m)
- Tour: LPGA Tour
- Format: Stroke play – 72 holes
- Prize fund: $2.25 million
- Month played: March

Tournament record score
- Aggregate: 260 Kim Hyo-joo (2026)
- To par: −28 as above

Current champion
- (South Korea) Kim Hyo-joo

Final champion
- Location in the United States Location in Arizona

The Ford Championship is a women's professional golf tournament held in Chandler, Arizona, United States, as part of the LPGA Tour. The tournament, which began in 2024, switched its venue to Whirlwind Golf Club in 2025 after previously being hosted at Seville Golf and Country Club. The event features a purse of $2.25 million.

== Tournament names ==
- 2024: Ford Championship
- 2025–present: Ford Championship presented by Wild Horse Pass

== Winners ==
Year	Date	Champion	Country	Winning score	To par	Margin of victory	Purse ($)	Winner's share ($)
2024	Mar 31	Nelly Korda	United States	66-68-69-65=268	−20	2 strokes	2,250,000	337,500
2025	Mar 30	Kim Hyo-joo	South Korea	69-66-67-64=266	−22	Playoff	2,250,000	337,500
2026	Mar 29	Kim Hyo-joo	South Korea	61-69-61-69=260	−28	2 strokes	2,250,000	337,500
