= Michael Allen (golfer) =

American professional golfer (born 1959)

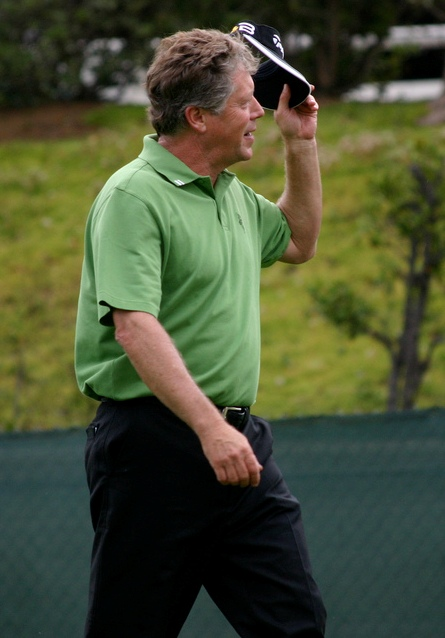
- Allen in 2008

Personal information
- Full name: Michael Louis Allen
- Nationality: United States
- Born: January 31, 1959 (age 67) San Mateo, California, U.S.
- Height: 6 ft 0 in (1.83 m)
- Weight: 195 lb (88 kg; 13.9 st)
- Spouse: Cynthia Allen
- Children: Christy and Michelle

Career
- Sport: Golf
- College: University of Nevada
- Turned professional: 1984
- Current tour: PGA Tour Champions
- Former tours: PGA Tour; European Tour; Nationwide Tour
- Professional wins: 11
- Highest ranking: 76 (September 10, 1989)

Number of wins by tour
- European Tour: 1
- Korn Ferry Tour: 1
- PGA Tour Champions: 8
- Other: 1

Best results in major championships
- Masters Tournament: DNP
- PGA Championship: T19: 2009
- U.S. Open: T12: 2001
- The Open Championship: T52: 1989

Michael Louis Allen (born January 31, 1959) is an American professional golfer, currently on the PGA Tour Champions.

== Early life and amateur career ==
Allen was born in San Mateo, California and played college golf at the University of Nevada in Reno.

== Professional career ==
Allen turned professional in 1984 and played on the European Tour 1986-89 and 1992, winning the 1989 Scottish Open. Allen played on the PGA Tour 1990-95, 2002, and 2004-09. He has played over 300 events on the PGA Tour and has three second-place finishes (2004 Chrysler Classic of Greensboro, 2007 Turning Stone Resort Championship and 2010 Viking Classic) and three third-place finishes, but no wins. He played on the Nationwide Tour from 1997 to 2001 and 2003, winning the Nike Greater Austin Open in 1998.

Allen received a special invitation to play at the Senior PGA Championship on the Champions Tour at the Canterbury Golf Club in Beachwood, Ohio because of his career earnings on the PGA Tour. He was a surprise winner of the event in his Champions Tour debut making his first win a major. He shot a first round of 4-over-par, but made only 3 bogeys in the final 3 rounds to win by 2 strokes over Larry Mize and 3 strokes over Bruce Fleisher.

A member of the Olympic Club in San Francisco since age 14, Allen qualified for the U.S. Open in 2012 at age 53. At the previous Opens at Olympic in 1987 and 1998, he had failed to make the field.

== Professional wins (11) ==
=== European Tour wins (1) ===
No.	Date	Tournament	Winning score	To par	Margin of victory	Runners-up
1	Jul 15, 1989	Bell's Scottish Open	73-66-70-63=272	−8	2 strokes	(Spain) José María Olazábal, (Wales) Ian Woosnam

=== Nike Tour wins (1) ===
No.	Date	Tournament	Winning score	To par	Margin of victory	Runners-up
1	Mar 8, 1998	Nike Greater Austin Open	66-72-66-76=280	−8	2 strokes	(United States) Gene Sauers, (United States) Chris Zarmon

=== Other wins (1) ===
- 2003 Southern Arizona Open

=== PGA Tour Champions wins (8) ===
Legend
Senior major championships (1)
Other PGA Tour Champions (7)

No.	Date	Tournament	Winning score	To par	Margin of victory	Runner(s)-up
1	May 24, 2009	Senior PGA Championship	74-66-67-67=274	−6	2 strokes	(United States) Larry Mize
2	Apr 15, 2012	Encompass Insurance Pro-Am of Tampa Bay	66-67-68=201	−12	3 strokes	(United States) Kenny Perry
3	Apr 22, 2012	Liberty Mutual Insurance Legends of Golf (with (South Africa) David Frost)	62-63-62=187	−29	1 stroke	(United States) John Cook and (United States) Joey Sindelar
4	Mar 24, 2013	Mississippi Gulf Resort Classic	70-68-67=205	−11	1 stroke	(Germany) Bernhard Langer
5	Oct 20, 2013	Greater Hickory Kia Classic at Rock Barn	67-65-65=197	−13	Playoff	(United States) Olin Browne
6	Feb 9, 2014	Allianz Championship	60-69-69=198	−18	Playoff	(United States) Duffy Waldorf
7	Oct 26, 2014	AT&T Championship	70-65-66=201	−15	2 strokes	(United States) Marco Dawson
8	Apr 24, 2016	Bass Pro Shops Legends of Golf (2) (with (United States) Woody Austin)	49-59-48=156	−23	1 stroke	(England) Roger Chapman and (South Africa) David Frost

PGA Tour Champions playoff record (2–2)

No.	Year	Tournament	Opponent	Result
1	2010	Constellation Senior Players Championship	(United States) Mark O'Meara	Lost to par on first extra hole
2	2012	Dick's Sporting Goods Open	(United States) Willie Wood	Lost to par on first extra hole
3	2013	Greater Hickory Kia Classic at Rock Barn	(United States) Olin Browne	Won with birdie on first extra hole
4	2014	Allianz Championship	(United States) Duffy Waldorf	Won with birdie on second extra hole

== Results in major championships ==
Tournament	1988	1989	1990	1991	1992	1993	1994	1995	1996	1997	1998	1999
U.S. Open							DQ					
The Open Championship	CUT	T52	T53									
PGA Championship						T64						

Tournament	2000	2001	2002	2003	2004	2005	2006	2007	2008	2009	2010	2011	2012
U.S. Open		T12	CUT			T67			CUT				T56
The Open Championship													
PGA Championship						CUT			T47	T19			

Note: Allen never played in the Masters Tournament.

Did not play

CUT = missed the half-way cut
DQ = Disqualified
"T" = tied

== Results in The Players Championship ==
Tournament	1990	1991	1992	1993	1994	1995	1996	1997	1998	1999
The Players Championship	CUT				T62					

Tournament	2000	2001	2002	2003	2004	2005	2006	2007	2008	2009	2010
The Players Championship						T27			CUT	63	CUT

Did not play

CUT = missed the half-way cut
"T" = tied

== Senior major championships ==
=== Wins (1) ===
Year	Championship	Winning score	Margin	Runner-up
2009	Senior PGA Championship	−6 (74-66-67-67=274)	2 strokes	(United States) Larry Mize

=== Results timeline ===
Results are not in chronological order

Tournament	2009	2010	2011	2012	2013	2014	2015	2016	2017	2018	2019	2020	2021	2022	2023	2024	2025	2026
Senior PGA Championship	1	T11	T11	11	T20	T59	T26	T51	WD			NT	T40	37	T70	T72	T44	CUT
The Tradition		T2	4	T9	T5	T9	T5	T58	T54			NT	T42		T40	T63		T45
U.S. Senior Open		T6	T7	T33	5	T26	T26	5				NT						
Senior Players Championship		2	T17	T9	T4	T15	T26	T69	T12		T57		T52	T31	63	T26	T74	
Senior British Open Championship	T13	T30	T28	T18	T26	T29	T25	T51	T35			NT						

Win
Top 10
Did not play

CUT = missed the halfway cut
WD = withdrew
"T" indicates a tie for a place
NT = no tournament due to COVID-19 pandemic

== See also ==
- 1989 PGA Tour Qualifying School graduates
- 1990 PGA Tour Qualifying School graduates
- 1991 PGA Tour Qualifying School graduates
- 1992 PGA Tour Qualifying School graduates
- 1994 PGA Tour Qualifying School graduates
- 2001 PGA Tour Qualifying School graduates
- 2003 PGA Tour Qualifying School graduates
- 2005 PGA Tour Qualifying School graduates
- 2006 PGA Tour Qualifying School graduates
