= Legend Financial Group Classic =

Golf tournament

Tournament information
- Location: Highland Heights, Ohio, U.S.
- Established: 2005
- Course: Stonewater Golf Course
- Par: 71
- Length: 7,045 yards (6,442 m)
- Tour: Nationwide Tour
- Format: Stroke play
- Prize fund: $525,000
- Month played: July
- Final year: 2007

Tournament record score
- Aggregate: 268 Jason Day (2007)
- To par: −16 as above

Final champion
- (Australia) Jason Day
- Location in the United States Location in Ohio

The Legend Financial Group Classic presented by Cynergies Solutions was a golf tournament on the Nationwide Tour. It was played from 2005 to 2007 at Stonewater Golf Course in Highland Heights, Ohio, and sponsored by Legend Financial Group, a financial planning company. The 2007 purse was $525,000, with $94,500 going to the winner. The event did not return in 2008 due to poor fan attendance at the event.

== Winners ==
Year	Winner	Score	To par	Margin of victory	Runner-up
Legend Financial Group Classic
2007	(Australia) Jason Day	268	−16	1 stroke	(Australia) Scott Gardiner
2006	(Australia) Gavin Coles	274	−10	1 stroke	(Australia) Bradley Hughes
Cleveland Open
2005	(United States) Andrew Johnson	270	−14	3 strokes	(United States) Keoke Cotner

== See also ==
- DAP Championship, a Web.com Tour Finals event in the Cleveland suburb of Beachwood beginning in 2016
- Rust-Oleum Championship, a current Web.com Tour event that was played in Cleveland from 2014 to 2015
- Greater Cleveland Open, a Web.com Tour event from 1990 to 2001
- Cleveland Open, a PGA Tour event from 1963 to 1972
