= Corey Allen =

American director, writer and actor

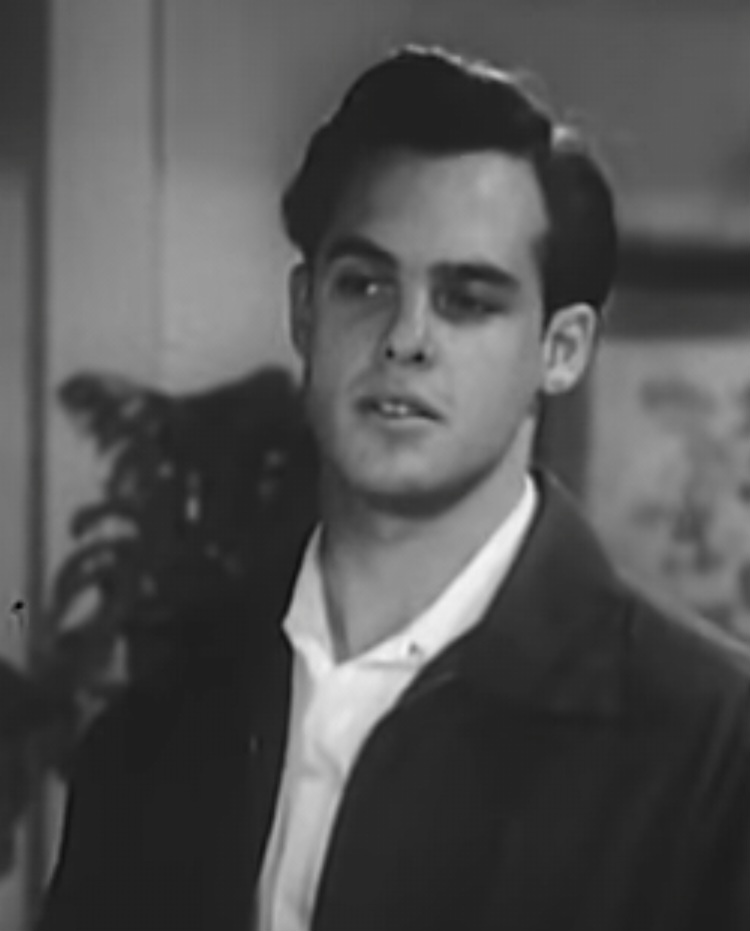
- Allen in an episode of Medic (1954)
- Born: Alan Cohen; June 29, 1934; Cleveland, Ohio, U.S.
- Died: June 27, 2010 (aged 75); Los Angeles, California, U.S.
- Resting place: Hillside Memorial Park Cemetery
- Education: UCLA School of Theater, Film and Television
- Occupations: Actor; director; producer; writer
- Years active: 1954–2009
- Children: 1
- Father: Carl Cohen

Corey Allen (born Alan Cohen; June 29, 1934 – June 27, 2010) was an American film and television director, writer, producer, and actor. He began his career as an actor but eventually became a television director. He is best known for playing the character Buzz Gunderson in Nicholas Ray's Rebel Without a Cause (1955). He was the son of Carl Cohen.

== Early life ==
Allen was born as Alan Cohen in Cleveland, Ohio, on June 29, 1934 to a Jewish family. He was the son of Carl and Frances (née Freudenreich) Cohen; his father was an illegal bookie and gambling operator for the Mayfield Road Mob in Cleveland, and later became an important gambling executive at the Sands Hotel and Casino in Las Vegas, Nevada. Cohen attended the University of California, Los Angeles, where he received his start in acting and was awarded a Bachelor of Fine Arts in 1954.

== Career ==
Allen was best known for his role as gang leader Buzz Gunderson in Nicholas Ray's 1955 film Rebel Without A Cause. James Dean starred as Jim Stark, a disaffected teenager who has moved to Los Angeles to start a new life, only to find more problems in his new home. After a show at the Griffith Observatory, Buzz challenges Jim to a knife fight, which Stark wins by subduing Buzz with his switchblade. During the filming of the knife fight both Allen and Dean, aficionados of method acting, used real knives and Dean was injured when Allen lunged at him with his knife.

The gang challenges Jim to a chicken run, in which two stolen cars will be raced towards a cliff and the winner will be the last one to jump out. Before the two embark on their death race, Buzz and Jim stand at the edge of the cliff, looking down at the fall they might face if they remain in their cars to the end. Buzz, realizing Jim’s moxie in accepting the car challenge and actually besting him in the earlier knife confrontation, discloses Jim has earned his respect, that he “likes him.” It’s a poignant moment where social acceptance is within the grasp of perpetual misfit Jim Stark. Jim had passed an initiation where he would be accepted in with the “wheels.” Jim thus questions why then go ahead with this race. Buzz underwhelmingly responds, "You got to do something, don't you".

Allen later recalled that his classic line was "the underlying question of each generation. Here we are: What do we do?". As the cars are heading to the cliff, Buzz attempts to jump out but is unable to escape when his leather jacket gets caught on the car door handle. He is killed in the crash on the beach below.

He appeared in some minor film roles before Rebel and afterward was seen in The Chapman Report, Darby's Rangers, Juvenile Jungle (film), Party Girl, Sweet Bird of Youth, in addition to guest appearances on Bonanza, Dr. Kildare, Gunsmoke, Have Gun, Will Travel and Perry Mason. In 1960 Allen played murderer Rennie Foster in "The Case of the Red Riding Boots", and in 1962 he played murder victim Lester Menke in "The Case of the Borrowed Baby".

He was actively involved in theatrical productions in the Los Angeles area, creating the touring company Freeway Circuit Inc. in 1959 and the Actors Theater in 1965. He was also involved in teaching theater at The Actors Workshop.

Allen turned to directing starting in the 1960s, where he worked on such television programs as Dallas, Hawaii Five-O, Hill Street Blues, Ironside, Mannix, Murder, She Wrote, Police Woman, The Rockford Files, Star Trek: Deep Space Nine, Star Trek: The Next Generation and The Streets of San Francisco. He won an Emmy Award, in 1984, for directing an episode of Hill Street Blues.

In 1967, Corey and his business partner Gary Stromberg met with Charles Manson early in both of their careers, as new director and cult leader respectively. Manson was invited to help them write a film treatment called Black Jesus (later produced by an Italian company in 1968) and Manson's "family" was allowed to live briefly in Corey's small acting studio on Western Avenue in Los Angeles. After Corey's then-girlfriend expressed her concerns about Manson, he broke ties with him.

== Personal life ==
Toward the end of his life, a fire burnt his home in the Hollywoods Hills above the Sunset Strip, and all of his belongings were lost. The only thing that the fire department recovered from the flames was his molten Emmy.

== Death ==
Allen died from complications of Parkinson's disease at his home in Hollywood on June 27, 2010, two days before his 76th birthday. He is buried in Hillside Memorial Park Cemetery in Los Angeles.

== Filmography ==
=== As director ===
- The Cosby Mysteries
- Star Trek: Deep Space Nine
  - episode The Maquis: Part 2
  - episode Paradise
  - episode The Circle
  - episode Captive Pursuit
- Star Trek: The Next Generation
  - episode "Journey's End"
  - episode "The Game"
  - episode "Final Mission"
  - episode "Home Soil"
  - episode "Encounter at Farpoint"
- The Search (1994)
- Men Who Hate Women & the Women Who Love Them (1994)
- Moment of Truth Stalking Back (1993)
- FBI: The Untold Stories
- Unsub
- The New Lassie
- Supercarrier
- The Ann Jillian Story (1988)
- J.J. Starbuck
- CBS Summer Playhouse
  - episode Infiltrator (1987)
- Destination America (1987)
- The Last Fling (1987)
- I-Man (1986)
- Beverly Hills Cowgirl Blues (1985)
- Brass (1985)
- Code Name: Foxfire (1985)
- Otherworld
- Murder, She Wrote
  - episode "Deadly Lady"
  - pilot episode "The Murder of Sherlock Holmes" (1984)
- Jessie
- Hunter
- The Paper Chase
  - episode "Billy Pierce"
- Hill Street Blues
  - episode "Hair Apparent"
  - episode "Goodbye, Mr. Scripps"
  - episode "Jungle Madness"
- Legmen
- Scarecrow and Mrs. King
  - episode "Always Look a Gift Horse in the Mouth"
- Whiz Kids
  - episode "Programmed for Murder"
  - episode "Fatal Error"
  - episode "Deadly Access"
- Gavilan
- Tucker's Witch
- Matt Houston
- The Powers of Matthew Star
- Capitol
- Simon & Simon
- McClain's Law
- Magnum, P.I.
- The Return of Frank Cannon (1980)
- Stone
- The Man in the Santa Claus Suit (1979)
- The Rockford Files
  - episode "No-Fault Affair"
  - episode "The Man Who Saw the Alligators"
  - episode "The Empty Frame"
- Trapper John, M.D.
  - episode "The Shattered Image"
- Stone (1979)
- Avalanche (1978)
- Police Woman
  - episode "The Young and the Fair"
  - episode "Do You Still Beat Your Wife?"
  - episode "The Lifeline Agency"
  - episode "Broken Angels"
- Lou Grant
- Thunder and Lightning (1977)
- Yesterday's Child (1977)
- Quincy, M.E. (1976)
- Executive Suite
- Bronk
- Kate McShane
- The Family Holvak
- Cry Rape (1973)
- Police Story (1973)
- Barnaby Jones (1973)
- The Streets of San Francisco
- Ironside
  - episode "But When She Was Bad"
  - episode "Too Many Victims"
- See the Man Run (1971)
- Cannon
- The Erotic Adventures of Pinocchio (1971)
- The High Chaparral
  - episode "A Good Sound Profit"
- Mannix
  - episode "Time Out of Mind"
  - episode "The Sound of Darkness"
- The New People
- Then Came Bronson
- Lancer
  - episode "Child of Rock and Sunlight"
- Hawaii Five-O
- Sea Hunt (1961) Season 4, Episode 21: "Quicksand"

=== As actor ===
Title	Year	Role	Notes
The Mad Magician	1954	Gus the Stagehand	Uncredited
A Time Out of War	1954	Connor	Short
The Bridges at Toko-Ri	1954	Enlisted Man	Uncredited
The Night of the Hunter	1955	Young Man in Town	Uncredited
Rebel Without a Cause	1955	Buzz Gunderson	
Alfred Hitchcock Presents	1956	Gil Dalliford	Season 2 Episode 10: "Jonathan"
The Shadow on the Window	1957	Gil Ramsey	
The Big Caper	1957	Roy	
The Restless Gun	1958	George	Episode "Friend in Need"
Darby's Rangers	1958	Private Pittsburgh Tony Sutherland	
Juvenile Jungle	1958	Hal McQueen	
Party Girl	1958	Cookie La Motte	
Private Property	1960	Duke	Top Card Lead Billing
Key Witness	1960	Magician	
Sea Hunt	1961	Young	Episode: "Quicksand"
Sweet Bird of Youth	1962	Scotty	
The Chapman Report	1962	Wash Dillon	
Combat!	1964	Private Garrett	Episode: A Rare Vintage
Original: Do Not Project	1972	Psychiatrist	
The Works	2004	Mr. M	
Quarantined	2009	Mr. Eagle	Voice, (final film role)
