= Carl Cohen =

Carl Cohen may refer to:

- Carl Cohen (businessman) (1913–1986), American gambling executive and Las Vegas casino manager
- Carl Cohen (philosopher) (1931–2023), professor of philosophy at the University of Michigan, philosopher, and animal experimentation supporter
