= Frank Gagliardi =

American drummer

- Birth name: Frank Louis Gagliardi
- Born: November 16, 1931; Denver, CO, USA
- Died: February 16, 2011 (aged 79); Plano, TX, USA
- Genres: big band jazz
- Occupation(s): Composer, arranger, director
- Instrument(s): drums, percussion
- Years active: 1949–1996

Frank Gagliardi (November 16, 1931, Denver, CO – February 6, 2011, Plano, TX) was an American jazz drummer and percussionist, big band composer, arranger, director, and professor. He was the creator and director of the UNLV Jazz Ensemble from 1974 until 1996. Prior to that, he worked as the drummer and percussionist at the Sands Hotel, accompanying such notable performers as Frank Sinatra, Dean Martin, Sammy Davis Jr., Patti Page, Lena Horne, Steve Lawrence, Eydie Gorme, Joe Williams, Marlena Shaw and Joey Bishop among many others.

== Early life ==
Born in Denver, Frank’s interest in music started at a young age. Inspired by his accordion-playing older brother Vince, at age 8, Frank began the drum lessons that led to his becoming, at 17, a percussionist with the Denver Symphony Orchestra, where he played for the next 15 years. During that time, Frank earned his master's degree in Music Education and taught a course in Jazz at University of Denver.

== Career ==
In 1964, Frank was hired for what he called “the best job in the world”, percussionist in Antonio Morelli's orchestra for the Sands Hotel in Las Vegas, where he played for star entertainers such as Frank Sinatra and the “Rat Pack”. After 10 years, he joined the faculty of the University of Nevada, Las Vegas, and over the next 22 years, Frank led the UNLV Jazz Ensemble to international stature, traveling world-wide, capturing multiple awards, and releasing 12 albums and CDs. He continued performing at the Sands until 1988.

== Significant works ==
Frank Gagliardi was best associated with the work he did with the UNLV Jazz Ensemble including several albums such as That's a Wrap and Caliente, Muy Caliente. However, the most popular work with which he was associated was on the single, "What a Wonderful World", performed by Louis Armstrong on which he was percussionist. This song has appeared in many movies from Madagascar to Good Morning, Vietnam.

== Live performances ==
Though a live performer at the Sands for many years, Frank Gagliardi is probably best remembered for his work with the UNLV Jazz Ensemble. Under his direction, the UNLV Jazz Ensemble was highly acclaimed internationally performing regularly in such places as Japan, East Germany, and Peru.

== Legacy ==
At UNLV, Frank would not have had such a distinguished jazz program were it not for his passion for the music and his dedication to the students, many of whom looked to him for guidance beyond the classroom. He was always there to help, whether it was with a wise word, or a few dollars for rent or groceries.

== Personal life ==
He is survived by his wife of 57 years, Charleen; daughter, Susan; son, Ric and his wife, Linda; grandson, Alessandro; brother, Vincent; and the many students for whom he was a profound influence.
