= Jack Entratter =

American business executive (1914–1971)

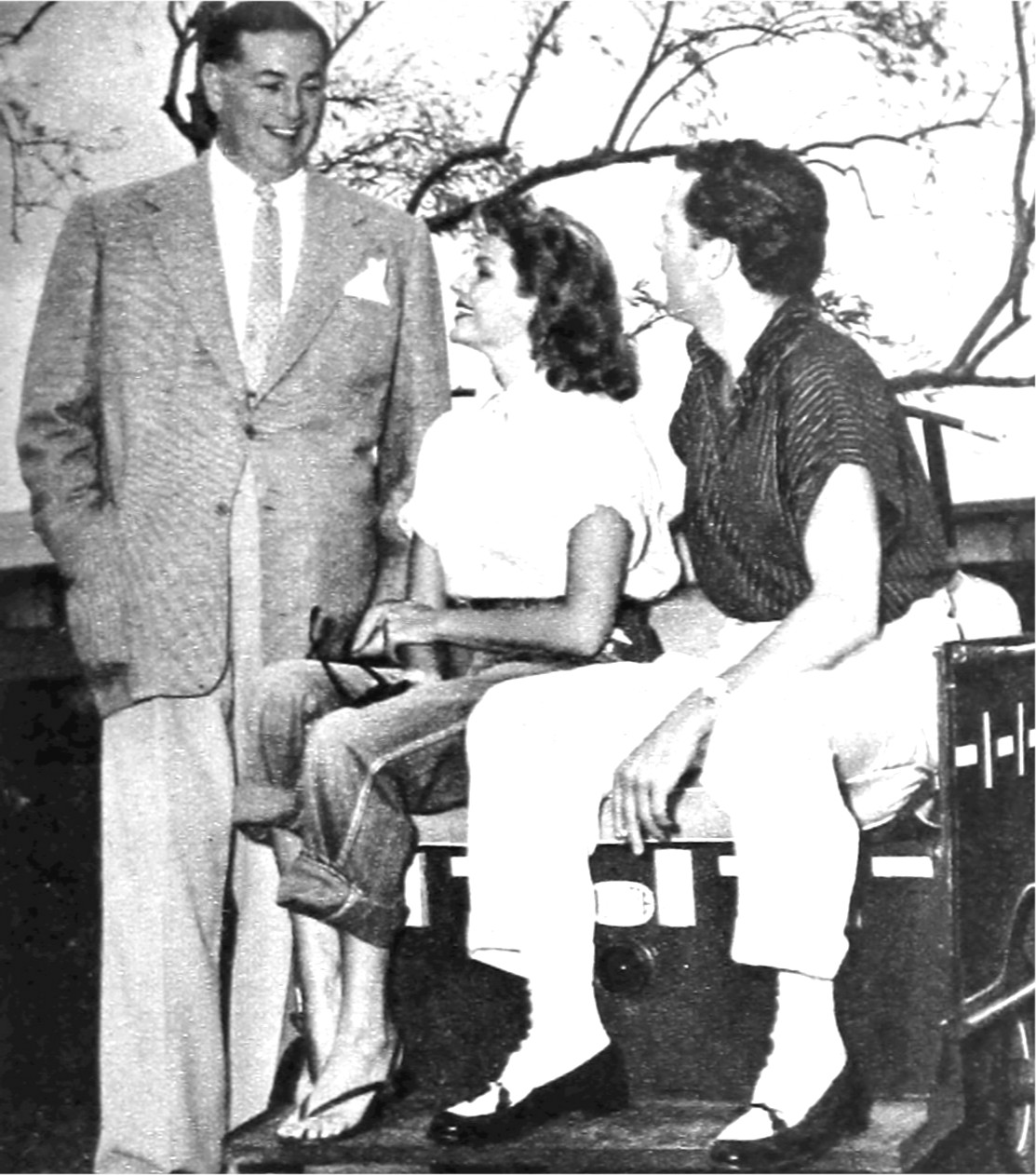
- Entratter (standing) in 1953
- Born: February 28, 1914; New York City, U.S.
- Died: March 11, 1971 (aged 57); Las Vegas, Nevada, U.S.
- Occupation: Businessman
- Spouse(s): Dorothy James (until her death); Lari Laine (divorced)
- Children: 2 (with Dorothy James)

Jack Entratter (February 28, 1914 – March 11, 1971), nicknamed "Mr. Entertainment", was an American business executive. He is best known for management positions at the Copacabana nightclub in New York City in the 1940s and early 1950s, and at the iconic Sands Hotel and Casino in Las Vegas from the early 1950s. He is closely associated with Frank Sinatra and the Rat Pack in the history of Las Vegas.

== Biography ==
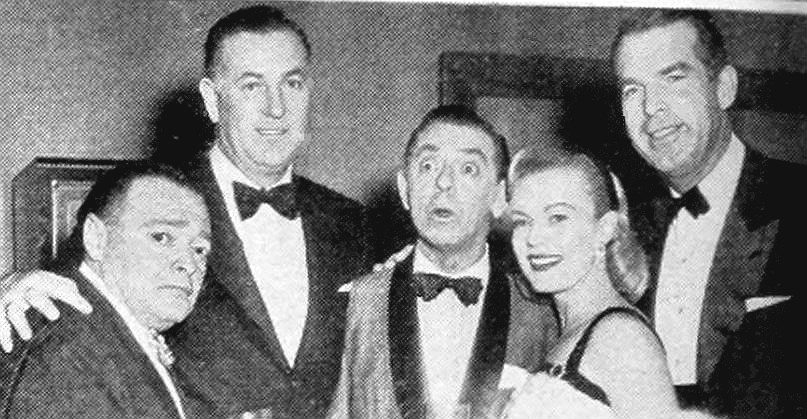
Entratter (second from left)

Entratter was born to a Jewish family, and began working in the French Casino in Miami as a reservation clerk as a teenager. He worked as a bouncer at the Stork Club in New York City in the 1930s. In 1940, he was appointed as an assistant to Jules Podell at the Copacabana nightclub, and was later general manager of the club. By 1949, he had a controlling interest in the nightclub, and he was still at the club in July 1952.

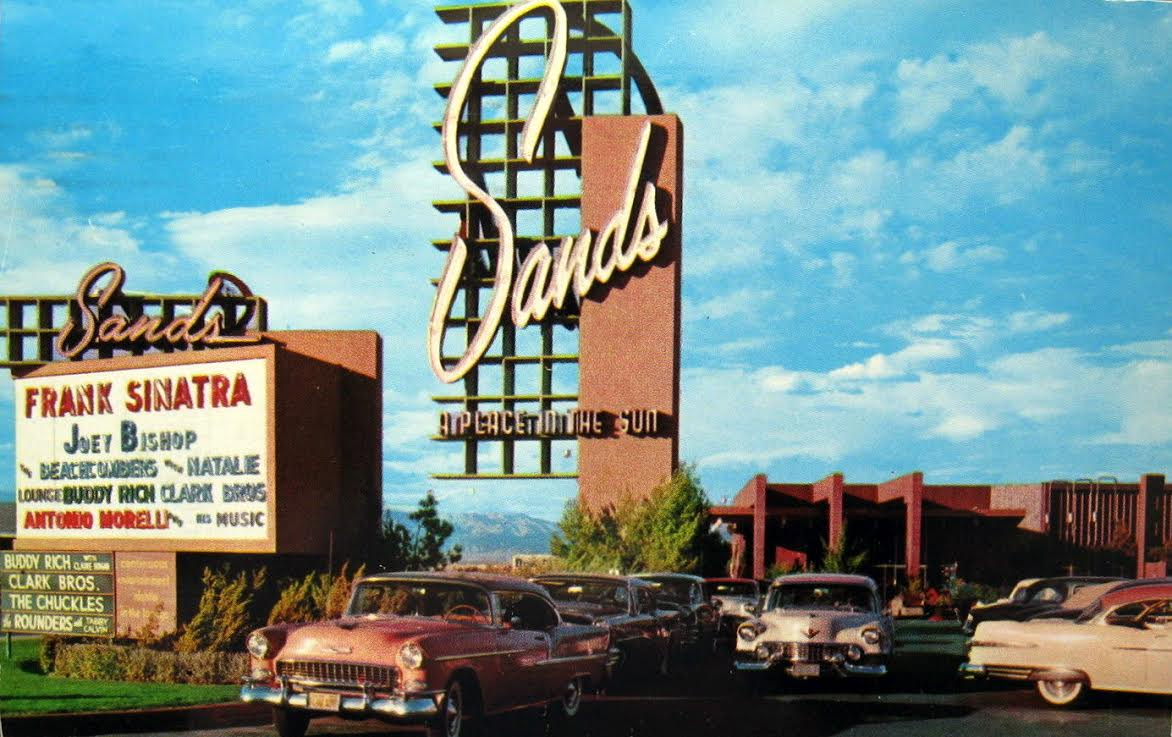
Sands Hotel and Casino

Entratter became general manager of the Sands Hotel and Casino in Las Vegas when it opened in December 1952. At the time, it was the most luxurious hotel on the Las Vegas Strip and among the world's best hotels. Entratter made many show business friends during his time as a manager at the Copacabana, where he gained renown for his smoothness in dealing with its performers and patrons. He was able to use these connections to sign performers for the Copa Room at the Sands, a nightclub that he built especially for Sinatra. Entratter offered entertainers an additional incentive to perform at the Sands. Headlining stars received "points", or a percentage of ownership in the hotel and casino. Entratter's personally selected "Copa Girls" wore $12,000 worth of costumes on the hotel's opening night (equivalent to $145,000 in 2025). This surpassed the salary of the Copa Room's star, Danny Thomas.

Due to organized crime involvement in the development of Las Vegas, Entratter was associated with mobsters such as Meyer Lansky and Hyman Abrams in the financing of the Sands, which he ran with Carl Cohen, who was its entertainment director and vice president. Nancy Sinatra wrote in her 1986 autobiography: "Sands was the place. Jack Entratter, Nick Kelly, Carl Cohen, they were quite a team. They knew what talent to book, what food to serve. They also knew how to be generous, and they weren't afraid to be. There were always free drinks for the gamblers". Entratter was still the manager of the Sands in 1966 when Sinatra's live album, Sinatra at the Sands, was recorded, as during the "Tea Break" Sinatra mentioned that Entratter had told him that many of the hotel suites of the new hotel block being built at the time would be given names to glamorize it, including the Danny Thomas, Red Skelton, Dean Martin and Jerry Lewis suites.

Entratter died in Las Vegas on March 11, 1971, after suffering a brain hemorrhage.

== Personal life ==
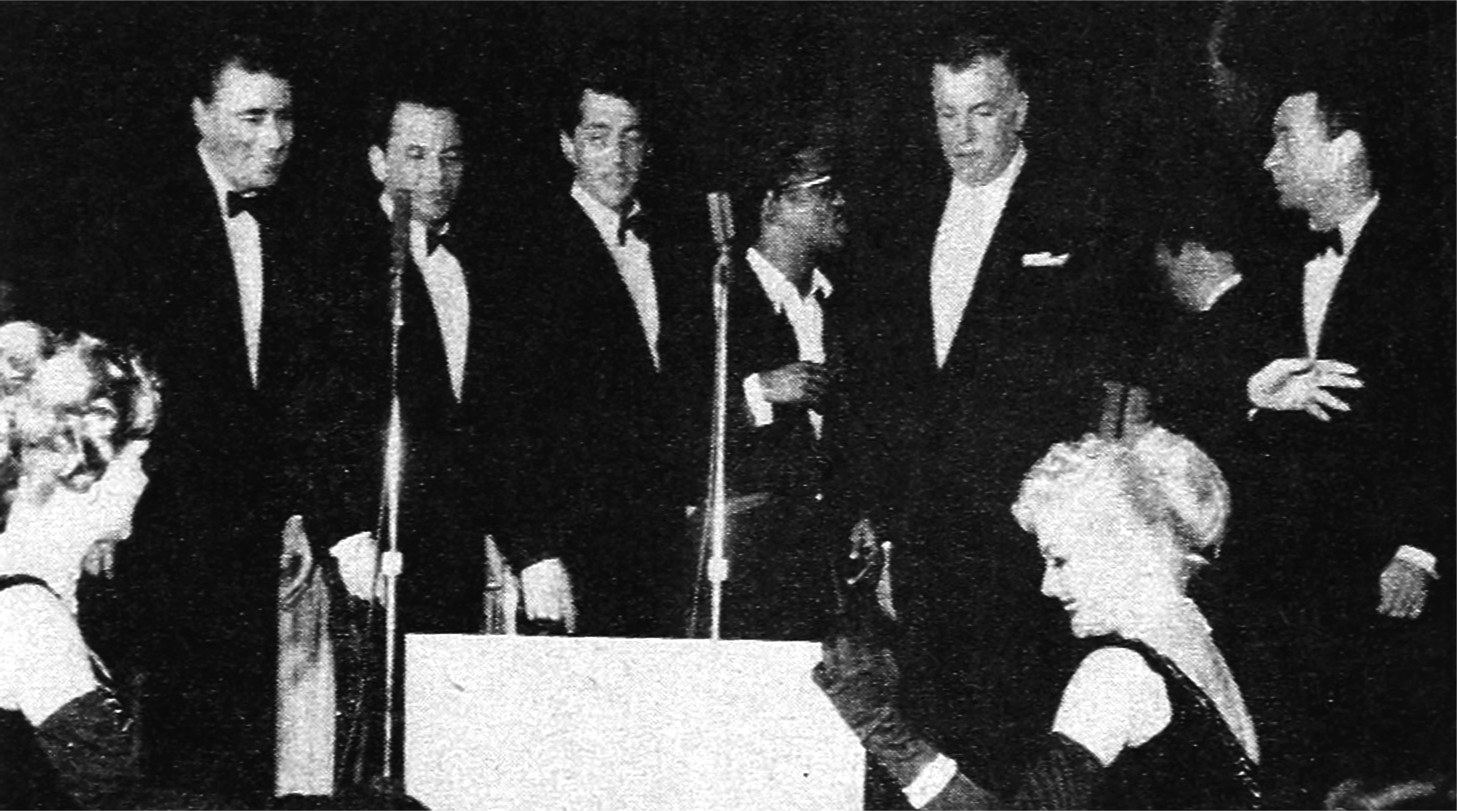
Entratter (5th from left) with the Rat Pack at the Sands in 1960

Entratter was married to Dorothy James until her death in 1961; they had two daughters, Caryl Entratter Palin and Michelle Entratter Walkoff. His second wife was model and actress Lari Laine (Corinne Cole). He was described as being a large man of 6 feet 4 inches (1.93 m) in height and 240 pounds (110 kg) in weight, with a "deep, baritone voice". He reportedly had a "slightly menacing character with the demeanor of an ex-boxer", yet was "smooth and courtly" to those he liked. Known as "Mr. Entertainment", he did not drink alcohol, gamble or smoke.

Entratter was congregation president of Temple Beth Sholom from 1959 through 1963, and again in 1966.

Entratter is the namesake for the AZA chapter of Las Vegas.

In film, he appeared as himself in Pepe (1960), and served as a technical advisor on Sinatra's 1955 film, The Man with the Golden Arm. He was one of the founders of the Jewish Federation of Las Vegas.

== Sources ==
- Alexander, Linda J. (July 2013). A Maverick Life: The Jack Kelly Story. BearManor Media. GGKEY:277941FZ6T0.
- Balboni, Alan Richard; Edwards, Jerome E. (2006). Beyond the Mafia: Italian Americans and the Development of Las Vegas. University of Nevada Press. ISBN 978-0-87417-681-0.
- Fishgall, Gary (June 15, 2010). Gonna Do Great Things: The Life of Sammy Davis, Jr. Simon and Schuster. ISBN 978-1-4391-3157-2.
- Kelley, Kitty (1986). His Way: The Unauthorized Biography of Frank Sinatra. Bantam Books Trade Paperbacks. ISBN 978-0-553-38618-9.
- Klein, Edward (1997). All Too Human: The Love Story of Jack and Jackie Kennedy. Simon and Schuster. ISBN 978-0-671-50191-4.
- Kuhns, Bradley W. (April 19, 2013). A Music Journey Remembered "The Life and Times of Brad Evans, Musician". Bradley Kuhns. ISBN 978-0-944647-58-5.
- Leigh, Spencer (September 25, 2015). Frank Sinatra: An Extraordinary Life. McNidder and Grace Limited. ISBN 978-0-85716-088-1.
- Marschall, John P. (2008). Jews in Nevada: A History. University of Nevada Press. ISBN 978-0-87417-737-4.
- Milne, Jeff (July 20, 2009). Six Degrees of Kevin Bacon: The Complete Guide to the Movie Trivia Game. Jeff Milne. ISBN 978-0-615-28521-4.
- Nash, Alanna (March 1, 2014). The Colonel: The Extraordinary Story of Colonel Tom Parker and Elvis Presley. Aurum Press. ISBN 978-1-78131-201-8.
- Papa, Paul W. (October 1, 2009). It Happened in Las Vegas: Remarkable Events that Shaped History. Rowman & Littlefield. ISBN 978-0-7627-5819-7.
- Sheridan, John Harris (September 6, 2011). Howard Hughes: The Las Vegas Years: The Women, the Mormons, the Mafia. AuthorHouse. ISBN 978-1-4634-0693-6.
- Sinatra, Nancy (1986). Frank Sinatra, My Father. Simon and Schuster. ISBN 978-0-671-62508-5.
- Weatherford, Mike (January 1, 2001). Cult Vegas: The Weirdest! the Wildest! the Swingin'est Town on Earth!. Huntington Press Inc. ISBN 978-0-929712-71-0.
