= Carl Cohen (businessman) =

American businessman

- Cohen in his office at the Sands Hotel c. 1950s–1960s
- Born: February 15, 1913; Cleveland, Ohio, US
- Died: December 26, 1986 (aged 73); Las Vegas, Nevada, US
- Occupations: Casino manager Gambling resort executive
- Employer(s): El Rancho Vegas; Sands Hotel and Casino; MGM Grand Hotel
- Spouse: Frances Freudenreich
- Children: 2, including Corey Allen

Carl Cohen (February 15, 1913 – December 26, 1986), was an American executive in the gambling resort industry in Las Vegas, Nevada, in the 1940s through 1970s and is credited with playing an important role in the development of Las Vegas as a premier resort destination.

He began his career as a bookie and operator in illegal gambling clubs operated by the Mayfield Road Mob in Cleveland, Ohio. Moving to Las Vegas, he became casino manager for the El Rancho Vegas in the 1940s and the Sands Hotel and Casino in the 1950s; he also had a controlling interest in both resorts. He advanced to senior vice president of the Sands and, in 1973, became senior vice president of the newly opened MGM Grand Hotel.

Cohen gained national notoriety for a 1967 altercation with Frank Sinatra at the Sands, in which he responded to the singer's drunken and aggressive behavior by punching him in the mouth and knocking the caps off his front teeth. Cohen was the father of American actor and film director Corey Allen.

== Biography ==
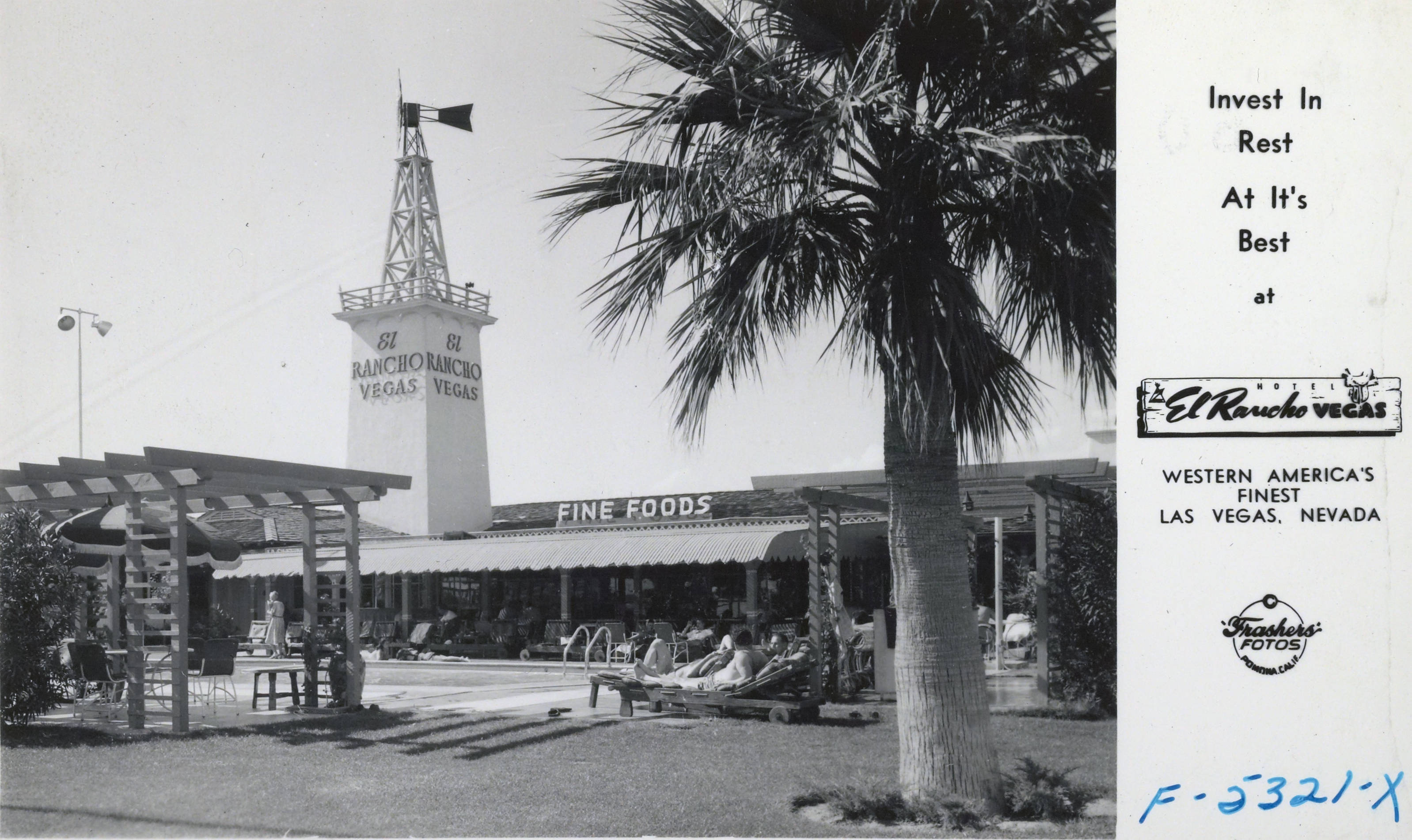
Postcard showing the El Rancho Vegas resort in the 1940s

Carl Cohen was born to a Jewish family in Cleveland, Ohio. He began his career as a bookie and an operator in illegal gambling clubs run by the Mayfield Road Mob in that city. The Mayfield Road Mob had connections to mobster Moe Dalitz.

Cohen moved to Las Vegas in 1941 to become casino manager at the El Rancho Vegas, where he succeeded by being "respectful always to the prerogatives of the Boys and of such esteemed guests as Howard Hughes, for whom he kept a hotel cabin permanently reserved". In 1943 he became part-owner of the resort.

His catering to Hughes was what lost him his job at El Rancho Vegas in 1955 and gained him a new job at the Sands. One night, El Rancho owner Beldon Katleman was inspecting the packed casino when he noticed a man dressed in jeans and tennis shoes sitting beside the well-heeled high rollers at the gaming tables. He ordered Cohen to eject the unsightly patron (it was Howard Hughes), Cohen refused, and their argument in the middle of the casino became physical when Katleman jabbed Cohen and Cohen punched Katleman in the jaw, flooring him. Cohen then walked out, followed by half of the dealers who were already disgruntled by Katleman's behavior. A few hours later, Jakey Freedman, one of the operators at the Sands, invited Cohen to come in for an interview, and Cohen accepted the job of casino manager, along with a controlling interest of five points in the hotel operation. He brought along the dealers who had walked out with him and many of his wealthy clients, including Hughes.

== Sands Hotel ==
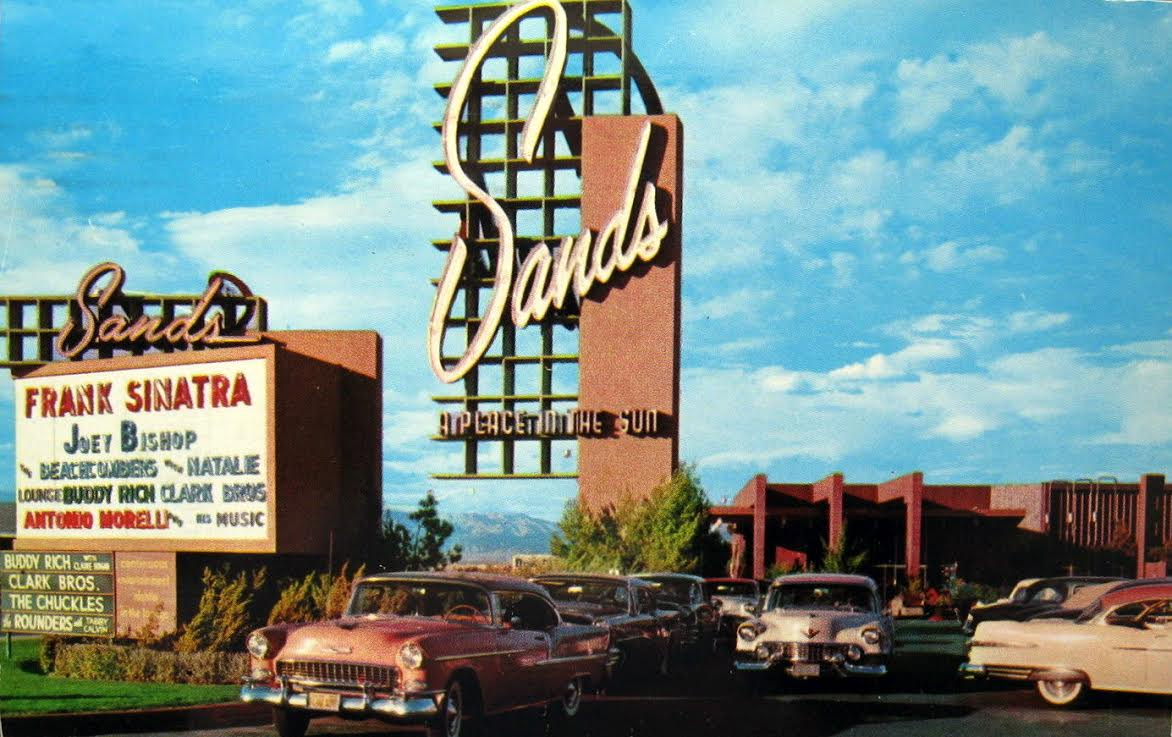
Sands Hotel and Casino in 1959

Together with Sands president Jack Entratter, Cohen was instrumental in upgrading the resort amenities to make the Sands "the most magnetic and sparkling operation on the whole of the booming Strip". His efforts included the 1959 introduction of a high-stakes baccarat table and a "floating crap game in the swimming pool". Cohen had one of the largest followings of high-stakes players, giving them preferential treatment such as "secret rooms where there were no betting limits".

Cohen was adept at managing many types of personalities and maintaining complete control of casino operations. He was said to be "mild-mannered" and "slow to anger", but was "fast and skillful with his fists when provoked". He was always on call to eject unruly patrons from the casino and also to protect showgirls from customers' advances.

Cohen provided employment at the Sands for family members: he hired his brother Mike to repair slot machines and later to deal cards, and his cousin H. Lee Barnes for an accounting position. Like Entratter, Cohen lived with his family on the premises and had a private swimming pool. In 1963 the FBI released to the Justice Department transcripts of conversations acquired through its illegal wiretapping of the homes and offices of 25 Las Vegas gambling executives connected with the mob. Cohen's wife Fran reportedly had a "nervous breakdown" when she discovered that their bedroom had been bugged.

=== Altercation with Frank Sinatra ===
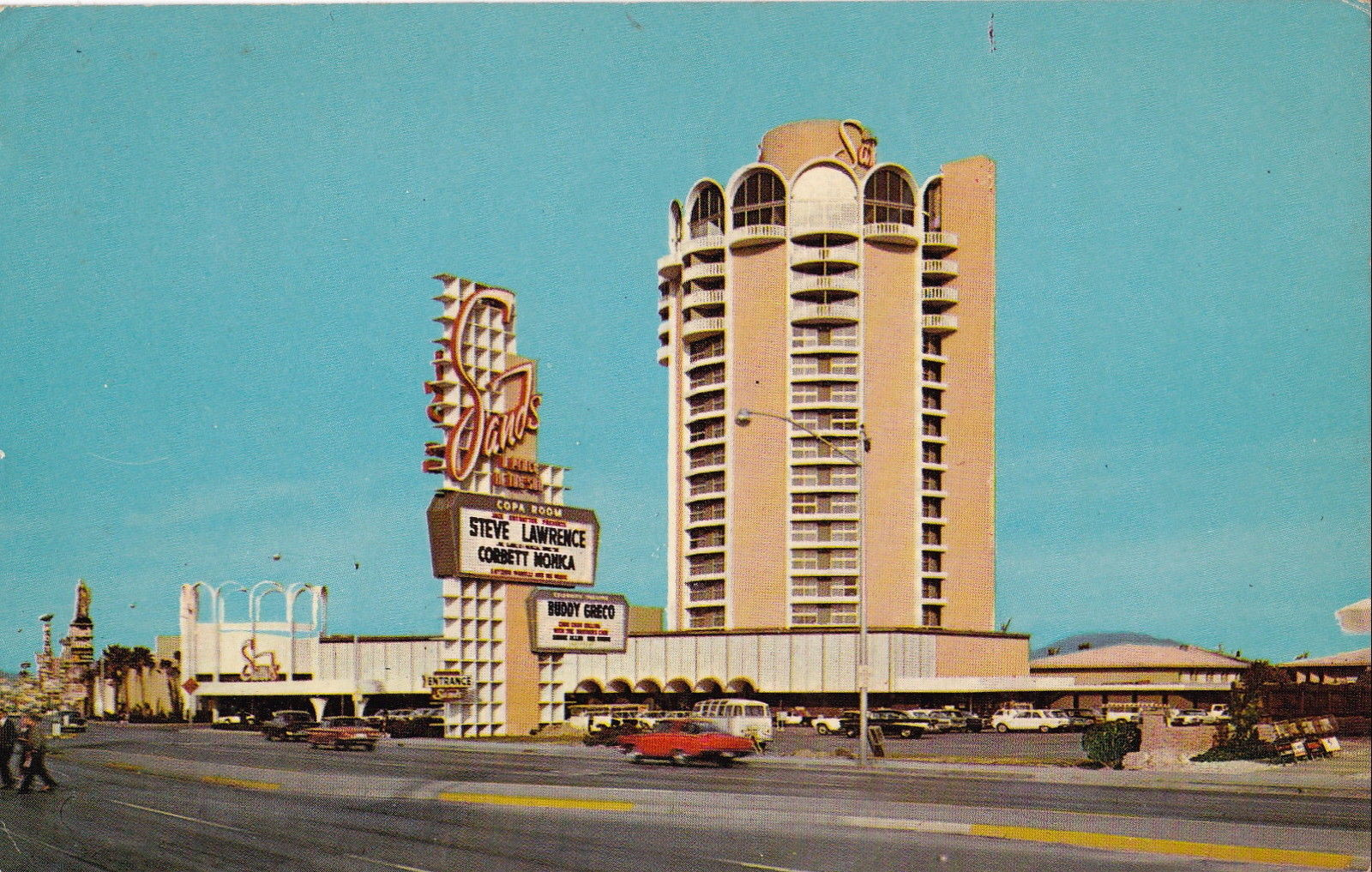
Sands Hotel c. 1967

Cohen was the target of an attack by Frank Sinatra on Monday, September 11, 1967, after the singer's casino credit had been stopped on the orders of Howard Hughes, who had purchased the Sands earlier that year. Sinatra reportedly owed the hotel casino $200,000. Sinatra flew into a rage and walked out before a performance on Saturday, September 9. He yelled at the pit bosses, destroyed the furniture in his penthouse apartment, steered a baggage cart through a plate-glass window in the shopping arcade, and ripped wires out of the hotel switchboard before leaving. Sinatra then flew to Palm Springs and signed with Caesars Palace. He returned to the Sands in the early hours of Monday morning, demanding to speak to Cohen. At 5:45 a.m. having been awakened by an operator, Cohen agreed to come down and went to the coffee shop to have something to eat first. Sinatra confronted him there, unleashed a stream of curses and threats including, according to witnesses, an anti-Semitic slur, and upended the table laden with breakfast onto Cohen, spilling a potful of hot coffee on him. Cohen responded with a roundhouse punch to Sinatra's mouth, bloodying him. Sinatra attempted to throw a chair at Cohen but missed and hit a security guard instead. Then he left the premises.

Robert Maheu, chief executive of Nevada operations for Howard Hughes, informed his boss that Sinatra had been drinking and gambling excessively into the early morning hours for two nights straight. Maheu stated in his report:

At six a.m. today, Sinatra appeared at the Sands, made one hell of a scene and insisted on seeing Carl Cohen. He threatened to kill anyone who got in his way, used vile language, and said he would beat up the telephone operators if they did not connect him with Cohen, etc.

In an effort to calm the situation, Carl agreed to meet him. Sinatra called Cohen every dirty name in the book, said he was going to kill him, pushed a table over on Carl, picked up a chair and attempted to hit Carl over the head. Carl ducked, took a pass at Sinatra and floored him.

Though early reports said that the punch had knocked out Sinatra's front teeth, it actually only dislodged the caps on them. Sinatra's personal dentist, Dr. Abe B. Weinstein, flew to Beverly Hills, California, on Monday to treat him. Far from damaging his reputation, the incident made Cohen into a folk hero. The Sands switchboard was swamped with callers praising Cohen's action. In the November municipal elections that year, posters appeared with pictures of Sinatra "with his front teeth blackened out" and the slogan, "Carl Cohen for Mayor".

By 1968, Cohen was listed as senior vice president of the Sands. In fall 1973 he became senior vice president of the newly opened MGM Grand Hotel.

== Other activities ==
Cohen had an uncredited role as a craps cashier in the 1947 American film noir The Invisible Wall.

He was a member of the Las Vegas Jewish community and, in the 1960s, chaired one of the annual campaigns of the Jewish Federation of Las Vegas.

== Personal life ==
Cohen married Frances Freudenreich and the couple had two sons, Stephen and Alan. Alan studied acting at the University of California at Los Angeles and became an actor and director with the stage name Corey Allen.

Cohen died on December 26, 1986, in Las Vegas.
