= Copa Room =

Entertainment nightclub showroom in Las Vegas, Nevada, U.S.

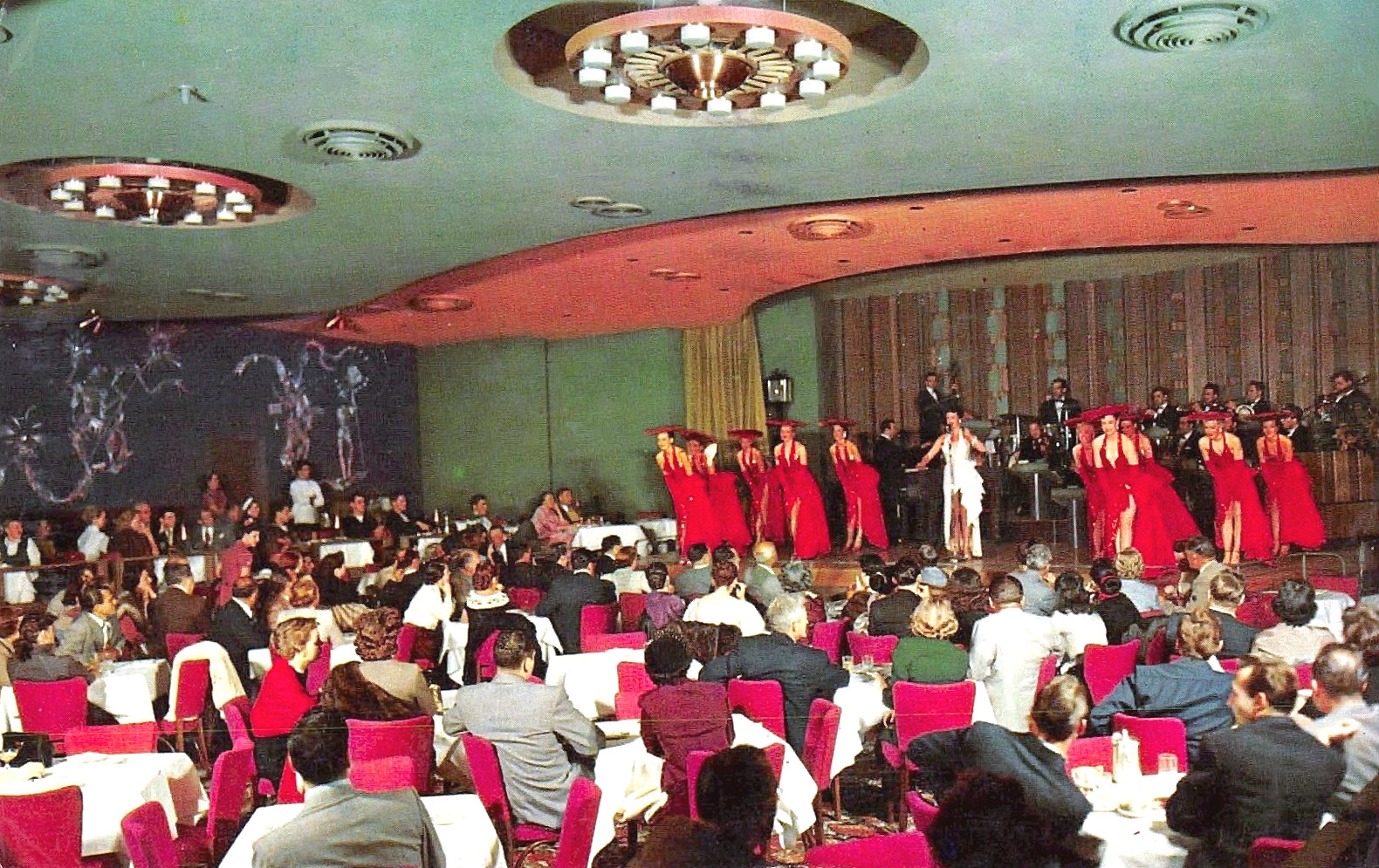
- Interactive map of Copa Room
- Address: 3950 Las Vegas Boulevard South; Las Vegas, Nevada 89119
- Location: Paradise, Nevada, U.S.
- Coordinates: 36.1214°N 115.1689°W
- Owner: Las Vegas Sands
- Type: showroom

Construction
- Built: 1952
- Opened: 1952
- Closed: 1996

The Copa Room was an entertainment nightclub showroom at the now-defunct Sands Hotel on The Las Vegas Strip in Las Vegas, Nevada. It was demolished in 1996 when the Sands Hotel was imploded.

It was noteworthy for the many popular entertainers who performed there, including members of the Rat Pack, Count Basie, Ella Fitzgerald, Judy Garland, Lena Horne, Jimmy Durante, Tony Bennett, Nat King Cole, Peggy Lee, Edith Piaf and Bobby Darin, among others.

It was also the recording venue for several live albums, including Frank Sinatra's Sinatra at the Sands, Sammy Davis Jr.'s That's All! and The Sounds of '66, and Dean Martin's Live at the Sands Hotel - An Evening of Music, Laughter and Hard Liquor.

The Copa Room's showgirls were known as "The Copa Girls." The showroom took its name from the famed Copacabana in New York City. Hotel manager Jack Entratter used to be in charge of the New York venue for more than 12 years, where his showgirls were also known as the Copa Girls. Entratter designed the Copa Room to replicate the Brazilian decor at the Copacabana. The room seated about 400 people. Entratter never allowed his showgirls to appear onstage totally nude.

The musical director during the Copa Room's 1950s and 1960s heyday was Antonio Morelli.

In 1981, The Sands in Atlantic City, New Jersey, opened and renamed its showroom the Copa Room. The showroom featured many of the same entertainers as its Las Vegas counterpart.

== Notable performers ==
Musicians:

- 5th Dimension
- Air Supply
- The Ames Brothers
- Nancy Ames
- Paul Anka
- Ray Anthony
- Louis Armstrong
- Desi Arnaz
- Frankie Avalon
- Pearl Bailey
- Count Basie
- Shirley Bassey
- Tony Bennett
- Pat Boone
- James Brown
- Solomon Burke
- Sam Butera
- Lana Cantrell
- The Carpenters
- Vikki Carr
- Diahann Carroll
- Chubby Checker
- Cher
- Don Cherry
- Roy Clark
- Rosemary Clooney
- The Coasters
- Eddie Cochran
- Nat King Cole
- Bing Crosby
- Vic Damone
- Bobby Darin
- Sammy Davis Jr.
- Martin Denny
- Marlene Dietrich
- Bob Dylan
- Billy Eckstine
- The Everly Brothers
- Lena Horne
- Nelson Eddy
- Gloria Estefan
- Eddie Fisher
- Ella Fitzgerald
- The Four Tops
- Judy Garland
- Bobbie Gentry
- Georgia Gibbs
- Robert Goulet
- Buddy Greco
- Phil Harris
- Don Ho
- Lena Horne
- The Ink Spots
- Harry James
- Fran Jeffries
- Jack Jones
- Louis Jordan
- Quincy Jones
- Kessler Twins
- Sonny King
- The Kingston Trio
- Gladys Knight & the Pips
- Frankie Laine
- Carol Lawrence
- Steve Lawrence and Eydie Gormé
- Peggy Lee
- The Lennon Sisters
- Jerry Lee Lewis
- Little Anthony & the Imperials
- Trini Lopez
- Gloria Loring
- Jeanette MacDonald
- Dean Martin
- Tony Martin
- Al Martino
- Johnny Mathis
- Marilyn Maye
- Marilyn McCoo
- The McGuire Sisters
- Jimmy McHugh
- Robert Merrill
- The Mills Brothers
- Liza Minnelli
- Jane Morgan
- Anthony Newley
- Wayne Newton
- Patti Page
- Jan Peerce
- Peter, Paul & Mary
- Bernadette Peters
- Edith Piaf
- Marguerite Piazza
- Ezio Pinza
- Jane Powell
- Louis Prima
- Sue Raney
- Johnnie Ray
- Helen Reddy
- Della Reese
- The Righteous Brothers
- Johnny Rivers
- Smokey Robinson
- Linda Ronstadt
- Bobby Rydell
- Tommy Sands
- Mongo Santamaria
- Neil Sedaka
- Doc Severinsen
- Sha Na Na
- Dinah Shore
- Frank Sinatra
- Frank Sinatra Jr.
- Keely Smith
- O.C. Smith
- The Staples Singers
- Kay Starr
- Kaye Stevens
- The Sylvers
- The Temptations
- B.J. Thomas
- The Three Degrees
- Mel Tormé
- Sophie Tucker
- Leslie Uggams
- Jerry Vale
- Dana Valery
- Rudy Vallee
- Frankie Valli
- Sylvie Vartan
- Sarah Vaughan
- Bobby Vinton
- Dionne Warwick
- Mary Wilson
- Nancy Wilson
- Tammy Wynette
- Timi Yuro

Comedians:

- Don Adams
- Allen & Rossi
- Louie Anderson
- Dave Barry
- Milton Berle
- Joey Bishop
- Elayne Boosler
- David Brenner
- Marty Brill
- Foster Brooks
- Johnny Brown
- Carol Burnett
- George Burns
- Ruth Buzzi
- John Byner
- Sid Caesar
- Charlie Callas
- Jack Carter
- Myron Cohen
- Bobby Collins
- Pat Cooper
- Bill Cosby
- Norm Crosby
- Billy Crystal
- Rodney Dangerfield
- Phyllis Diller
- Jeff Dunham
- Jimmy Durante
- Wayland Flowers and Madame
- Gallagher
- Paul Gilbert
- George Gobel
- Frank Gorshin
- Shecky Greene
- Bob Hope
- Spike Jones
- Betty and Jane Kean
- Alan King
- Sam Kinison
- Murray Langston
- Jerry Lewis
- Joe E. Lewis
- Richard Lewis
- Rich Little
- Carlos Mencia
- Corbett Monica
- Gary Morton
- Jan Murray
- Bob Newhart
- Louis Nye
- John Pinette
- Richard Pryor
- Don Rickles
- The Ritz Brothers
- Joan Rivers
- Paul Rodriguez
- Rowan & Martin
- Rita Rudner
- Nipsey Russell
- Mort Sahl
- Dick Shawn
- Allan Sherman
- Red Skelton
- Stiller and Meara
- Alan Sues
- Judy Tenuta
- Fred Travalena
- Danny Thomas
- Jerry Van Dyke
- Jackie Vernon
- Slappy White
- JoAnne Worley

Dancers/Other Celebrities:

- Susan Anton
- Tallulah Bankhead
- Ray Bolger
- John Brascia
- Francis Brunn
- Bruce Cabot
- Cyd Charisse
- Noël Coward
- Denise Darcel
- Patty Duke
- Nanette Fabray
- Lola Falana
- The Four Step Brothers
- Teresa Graves
- Peter Lind Hayes
- Mary Healy
- Florence Henderson
- Gregory Hines
- Maurice Hines
- Van Johnson
- Paula Kelly
- Peter Lawford
- Michele Lee
- Sheldon Leonard
- Hal Le Roy
- Shirley MacLaine
- Dave Madden
- Jayne Mansfield
- Peter Marshall
- Sid Melton
- Rita Moreno
- The Nicholas Brothers
- Juliet Prowse
- Debbie Reynolds
- Sugar Ray Robinson
- Ginger Rogers
- Jane Russell
- Connie Stevens
- Mamie Van Doren
- Shani Wallis
- Patrice Wymore
