= Sands Hotel and Casino =

Historic hotel and casino in Nevada, United States

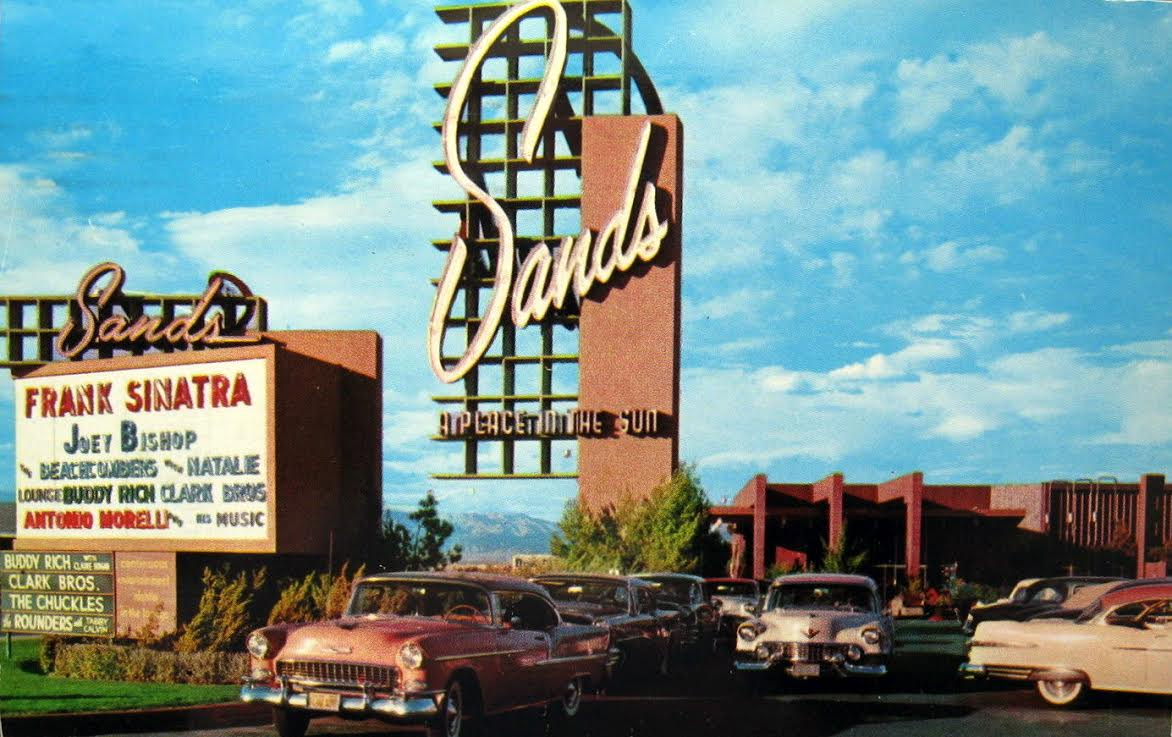
- Sands Hotel and Casino in 1959

- Location within Las Vegas Strip Location within Nevada
- Interactive map of Sands Hotel and Casino
- Location: Paradise, Nevada; 3355 South Las Vegas Boulevard; 36°07′17″N 115°10′08″W
- Opened: December 15, 1952; 73 years ago
- Closed: June 30, 1996; 30 years ago
- No. of rooms: 200 (1952); 715 (1996)
- Signature attractions: Copa Room
- Casino type: Land-based
- Owner: 1967–1981 Howard Hughes; 1981–1983 Inns of Americas; 1983–1988 Summa Corp. 1988–1989 MGM Grand, Inc. 1989–1996 Las Vegas Sands
- Architect: Wayne McAllister (1952); Julius Gabrielle (Aqueduct); Martin Stern Jr. (1964)
- Renovated in: 1965, 1978

The Sands Hotel and Casino was a historic hotel and casino on the Las Vegas Strip in Paradise, Nevada, United States, that operated from 1952 to 1996. Designed by architect Wayne McAllister, with a prominent 56-foot (17 m) high sign, the Sands was the seventh resort to open on the Strip. During its heyday, it hosted many famous entertainers of the day, most notably the Rat Pack and Jerry Lewis.

The hotel was established in 1952 by Mack Kufferman, who bought the LaRue Restaurant which had opened a year earlier. The hotel was opened on December 15, 1952, as a casino and hotel with 200 rooms. The hotel rooms were divided into four two-story motel wings, each with fifty rooms, and named after famous race tracks. Crime bosses such as Doc Stacher and Meyer Lansky acquired shares in the hotel and attracted Frank Sinatra, who made his performing debut at Sands in October 1953. Sinatra later bought a share in the hotel himself. In 1960, the classic caper film Ocean's 11 was shot at the hotel, and it subsequently attained iconic status, with regular performances by Sinatra, Dean Martin, Jerry Lewis, Sammy Davis Jr., Red Skelton and others in the hotel's world-renowned Copa Room.

In 1966, Sands opened a 500-room tower. In 1967, Sands became the first of several Las Vegas hotels to be purchased by Howard Hughes. Its final owners were Sheldon Adelson, Richard Katzeff, Ted Bernard, Irwin Chafetz, and Jordan Shapiro. After buying out his partners, Adelson shut it down to build a brand new resort. On November 26, 1996, the Sands was imploded and demolished, and The Venetian was built in its place.

== History ==
=== Early history ===
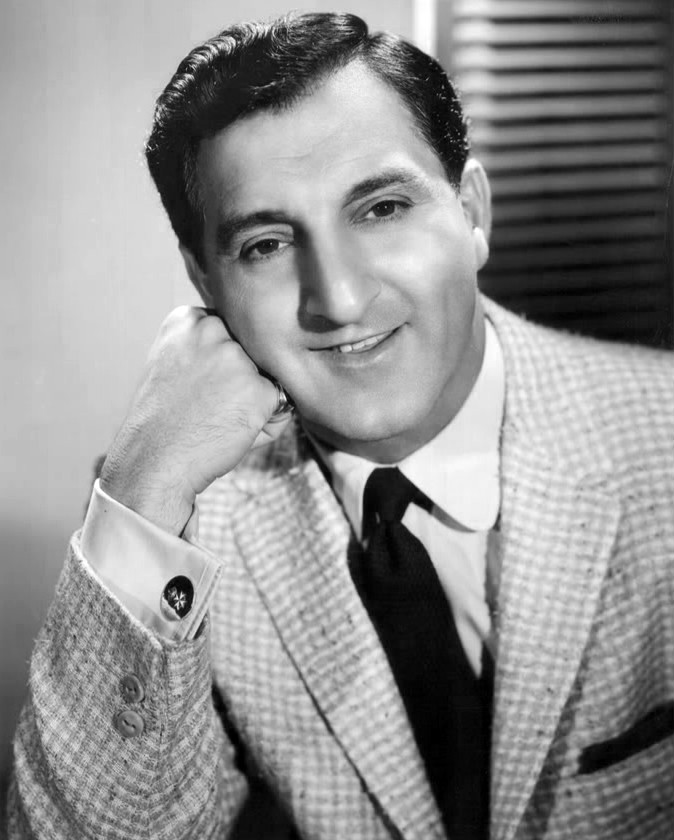
Danny Thomas performed at the Sands on its opening night

The LaRue Restaurant was established in December 1950 by Billy Wilkerson. The following year, Mack Kufferman bought LaRue, with plans to build a hotel and casino. Kufferman failed to gain a gaming license, and his shares in the project were sold to Jake Freedman. Numerous sources state that organized crime figures Meyer Lansky and Doc Stacher; illegal bookmakers like Mike Shapiro, (Note: Michael (Mike) Shapiro was a Los Angeles bookmaker. He had been associated with Hymie Miller and Sam Boss in a bookmaking establishment called "Western Commissions" on Washington Boulevard in Los Angeles. In 1952, he was a co-owner of record of the Sands hotel, as were Eddie Levinson, Eddie Torres, Hyman Abrams, Chicago racketeer Malcolm Clarke, St. Louis bookie Sid Wyman and Louis Lederer. In 1956, he was one of the gambling licencees for the Fremont Hotel in downtown Las Vegas with a 6% ($150,000) stake.) Ed Levinson, and Sid Wyman; as well as Hyman Abrams and Jack Entratter were involved in the financing of Sands and had shares in it. Lansky and his mob assumed ownership of the Flamingo Hotel after the murder of Bugsy Siegel in 1947, and Lansky and New York mobster Frank Costello also had business interests in the Thunderbird Hotel and El Cortez Club in Downtown Las Vegas.

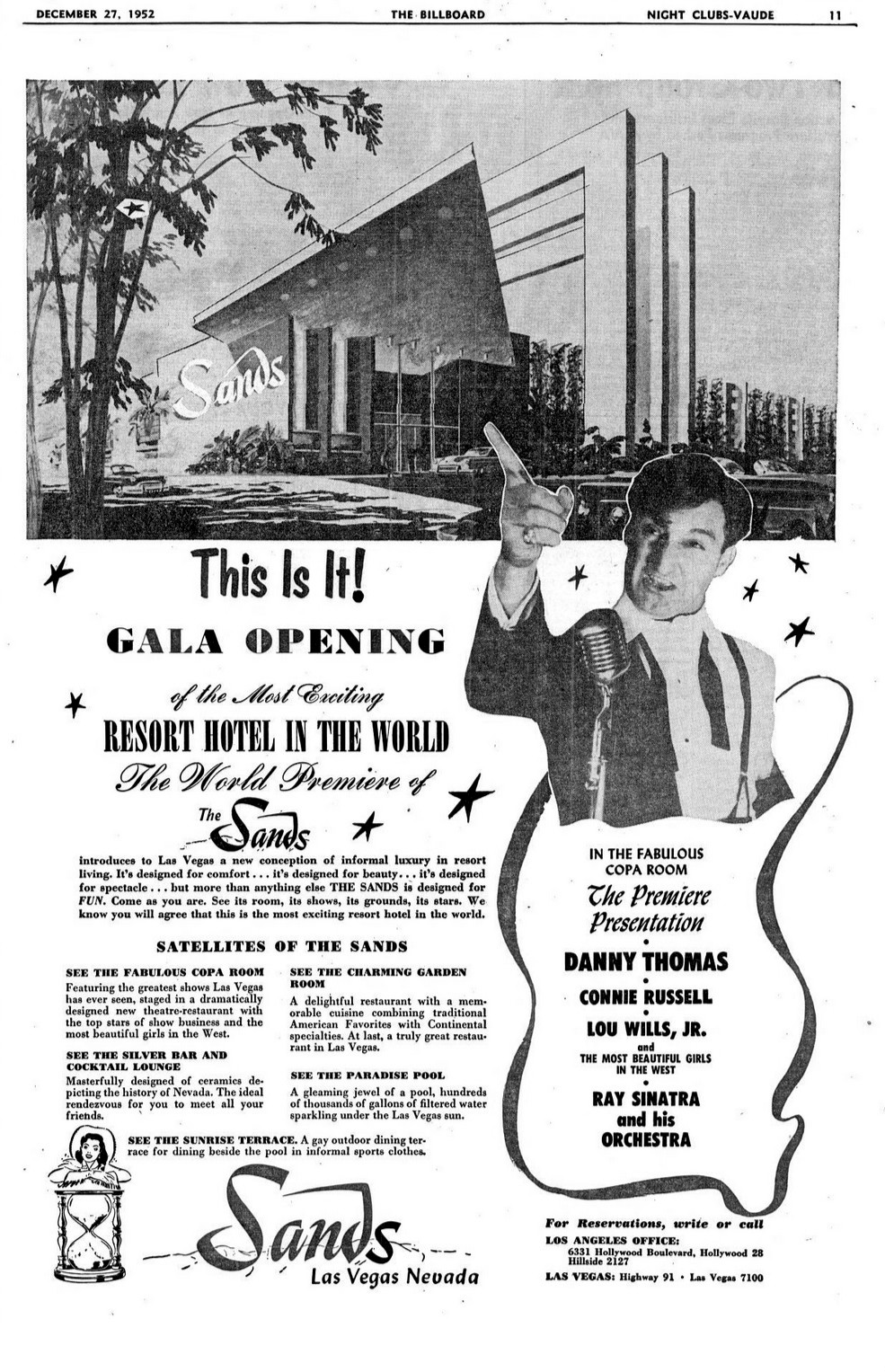
Advert for the opening in 1952

Construction began on Sands Hotel in early 1952, built to a design by Wayne McAllister. Trousdale Construction Company of Los Angeles was the general contractor. Initially the Nevada Tax Commission rejected Freedman's request for a gambling license due to his connections with known criminals. Freedman had initially intended naming the hotel "Holiday Inn" after the film of the same name starring Bing Crosby, but after noticing that his socks became so full of sand decided to name it Sands. The tag line would be "A Place in the Sun", named after a recently released film starring Montgomery Clift and Elizabeth Taylor, and quite suitable to the hot desert location of Las Vegas. The hotel was opened on December 15, 1952, as a casino with 200 rooms, and was established less than three months after the opening of another prominent landmark, Sahara Hotel and Casino. The opening was widely publicized, and the hotel was visited by some 12,000 people within a few hours. At the inauguration were 146 journalists and special guests such as Arlene Dahl, Fernando Lamas, Esther Williams, and Terry Moore. Every guest was given a Chamois bag with silver dollars, and Sands ended up losing $200,000 within the first eight hours. Danny Thomas, Jimmy McHugh and the Copa Girls, labelled "the most beautiful girls in the world", performed in the Copa Room on opening night, and Ray Sinatra and his Orchestra were the initial house band. Thomas was hired to perform for the first two weeks, but strained his voice on the second night and developed laryngitis, and was replaced with performers such as Jimmy Durante, Frankie Laine, Jane Powell, the Ritz Brothers, and Ray Anthony.

Jack Entratter, who was formerly in charge of the New York nightclub, the Copacabana, became the hotel's manager. Entratter made many show business friends during his time at the nightclub; he was able to use these connections to sign performers for the Sands Copa Room. Entratter was also able to offer entertainers an additional incentive to perform at the Sands. Headlining stars received "points", or a percentage of ownership in the hotel and casino. Entratter's personally selected "Copa Girls" wore $12,000 worth of costumes on the hotel's opening night; this surpassed the salary of the Copa Room's star, Danny Thomas.

In the early years, Freedman and his wife Carolyn were one of its attractions, wearing "matching white, leather outfits, replete with identical cowboy boots and hats". Freedman offered Carolyn's father Nathan a 5% stake in Sands but he declined the offer.

=== The Rat Pack and racial policy ===
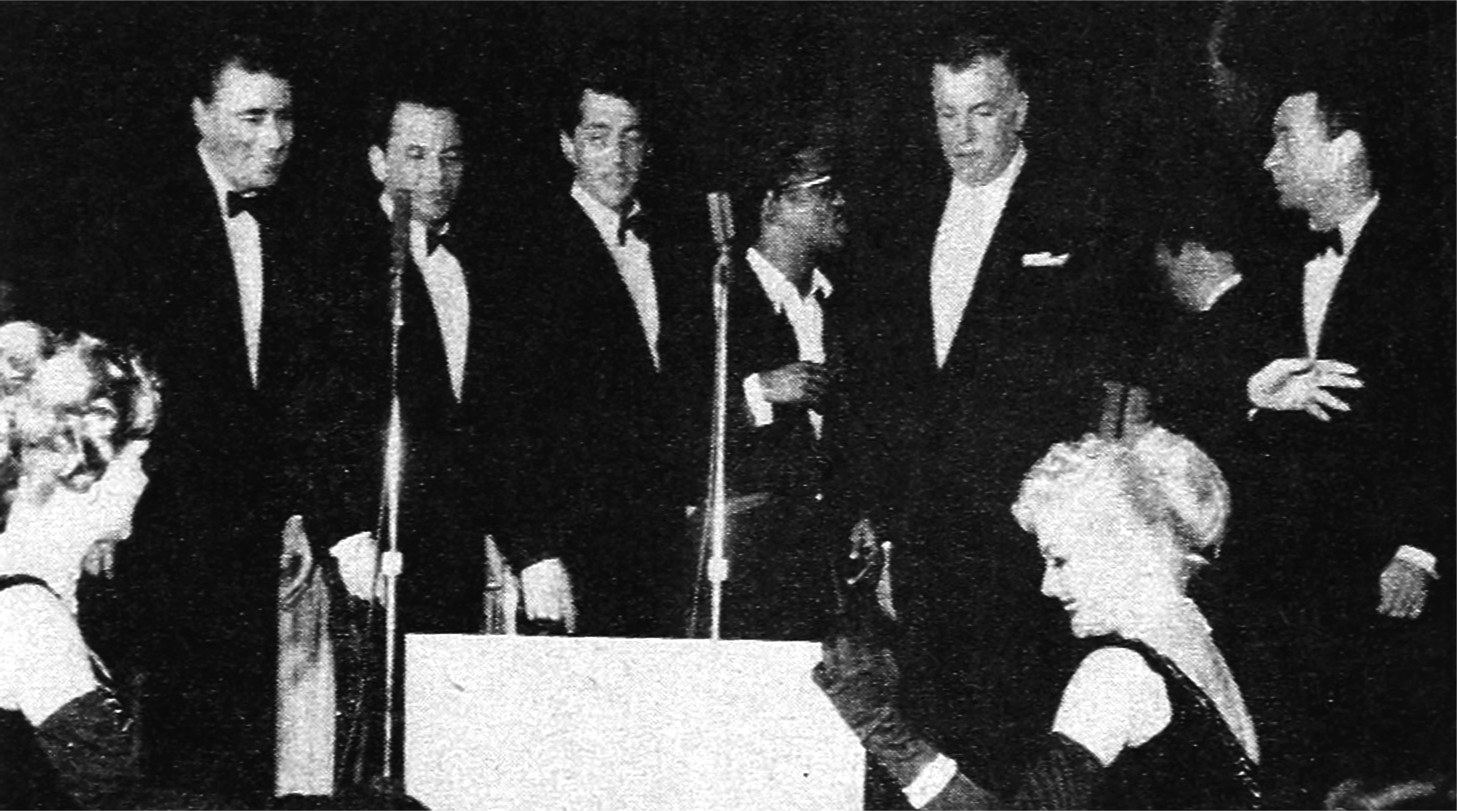
The Rat Pack with Jack Entratter in 1960

Lansky and Costello brought the Sands to Frank Sinatra's attention, and he began staying at the hotel and gambling there during breaks from Hollywood, though some sources state that he was not a hardcore gambler. Sinatra earned a notoriety for "keeping his winnings and ignoring his gambling losses", but the mobsters running the hotel were not too concerned because Sinatra was great for business. He made his debut performing at the hotel on October 4, 1953, after an invitation by the manager Jack Entratter. Sinatra typically played at Sands three times a year, sometimes a two-week stint, which "brought in the big rollers, a lot of oil money from Texas". The big rollers left Vegas when Sinatra did, and other performers were reluctant to perform after him, feeling intimidated.

Entratter replaced Freedman as the president of the Sands Hotel following his death from heart surgery on January 20, 1958. Freedman's last wife Sadie subsequently lived in a suite in the Belmont Park wing into the mid-1960s until her death. Sinatra, who had attempted to buy a share in the hotel soon after first visiting in 1953, but was denied by the Nevada Tax Commission, was now granted permission to buy a share in the hotel, due to his phenomenal impact upon business in Las Vegas. His share, variously described as from 2 to 9%, aided Freedman's wife in paying off her husband's gambling debts. (Note: Under Entratter's "points" system, entertainers earned more of a percentage in the Sands by frequent performing appearances at the hotel. The more frequently someone performed there, the more his or her "points" would increase. Over time, Sinatra's appearances brought his share of the venue up to 9 %. Sinatra was ordered to sell his interest in the Sands in 1963, due to his association with Sam Giancana.)

In 1955, limited integration came to heavily segregated Las Vegas when the Sands first allowed Nat King Cole to stay at the hotel and perform. Sinatra noticed that he never saw Cole in the dining room, always eating his meals in solitude in his dressing room. When he asked his valet George to find out why, he learned that "Coloreds aren't allowed in the dining room at the Sands". Sinatra subsequently stated that if blacks were not permitted to eat their meals in the dining room with everybody else he would see to it that all of the waiters and waitresses were fired, and invited Cole to dine with him the following evening. Cole was allowed permission into the casino, as was another black performer, Harry Belafonte, who took a more aggressive approach by walking into the casino on his own accord and sitting at a blackjack table, which was not challenged by the bosses. Belafonte became the "first black man to play cards on the Las Vegas Strip."

Sammy Davis Jr. was instrumental in bringing about a general change in policy. When the Will Mastin Trio began performing at Sands in 1958, Davis informed Entratter that his father and uncle must be allowed permission to stay at Sands while he was performing there. Entratter granted them permission but continued his objection to admitting other black guests. In 1961, an African-American couple entered the lobby of the hotel and were blocked by the security guard, witnessed by Sinatra and Davis. Sinatra told the guards that they were his guests and let them into the hotel. Sinatra subsequently swore profusely on the phone to Sands executive Carl Cohen at how ridiculous the situation was, and the following day, Davis approached Entratter and demanded that Sands begin employing blacks. Shortly afterwards the hotel changed its policy and it began hiring black waiters and busboys and permitting blacks entry into the casino.

In the late 1950s, Senator John F. Kennedy was occasionally a guest of Sinatra at the Sands. Arguably the hotel's biggest claim to fame was a three-week period in 1960 during the filming of Ocean's 11, after which it attained iconic status. During that time, the movie's stars Sinatra, Dean Martin, Davis, Joey Bishop and Peter Lawford performed on stage together in the Copa Room. The performances were called the "Summit at the Sands" and this is considered to be the birth of the Rat Pack.

=== Later history ===
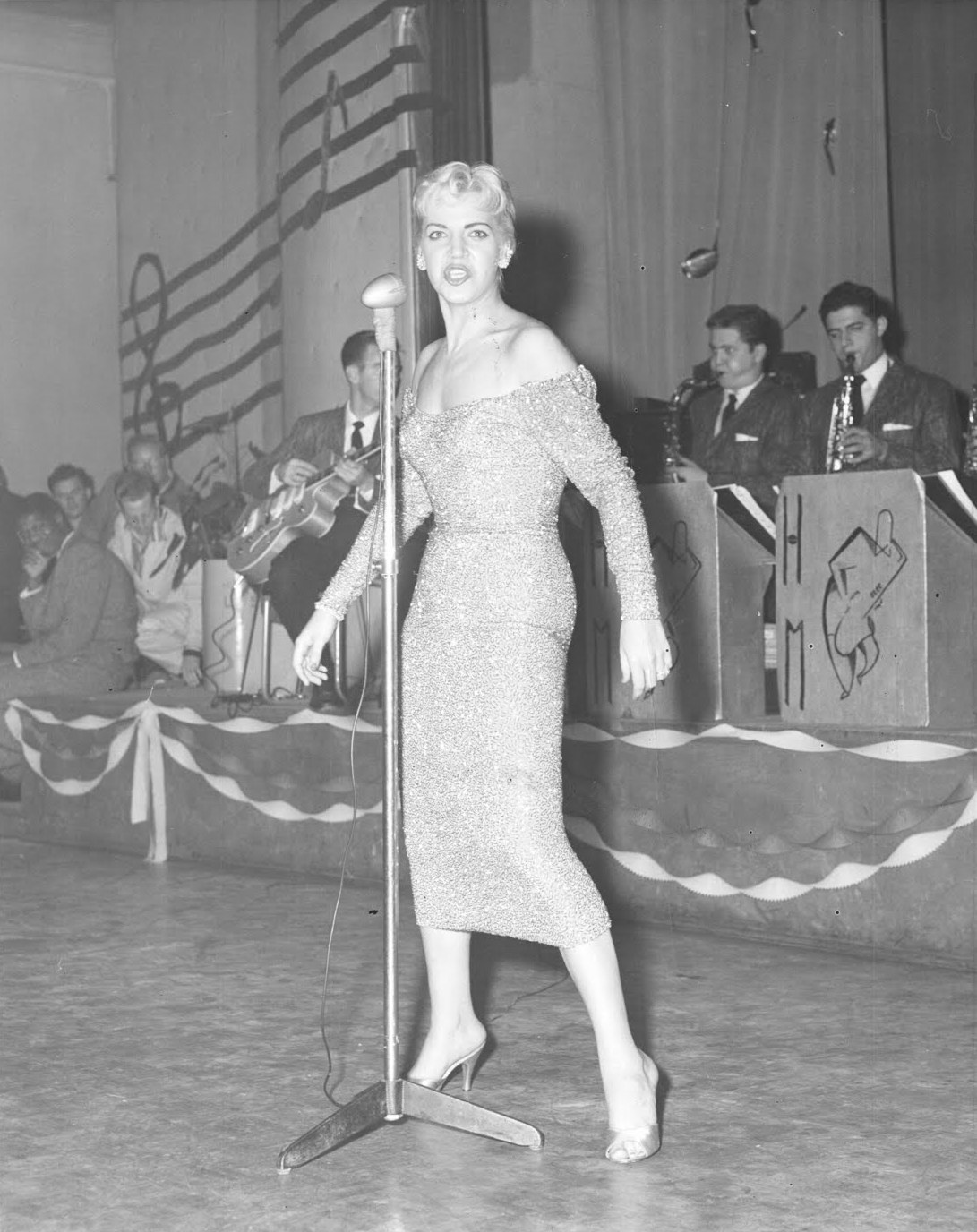
Lillian Briggs performing at the Sands in January 1956

When Howard Hughes purchased the hotel in the mid-1960s for $14.6 million, the architect Martin Stern Jr. designed a 500-room circular tower, which opened in 1967. The tower was built by R. C. Johnson and Associates General Contractors. The hotel became a Las Vegas landmark. Hughes grew particularly annoyed every time the Rat Pack were in his hotel, due to a hatred of Frank Sinatra which stemmed from the fact that he had been in love with Ava Gardner in the 1950s and she had run off to marry Sinatra. The ill feeling was reciprocated by Sinatra. Hughes plotted to oust Sinatra from the Sands for good, and asked Robert Maheu to draw up a plan shortly after the new hotel opened in 1967. The hotel imposed restrictions on what Sinatra could gamble in the casino, to just $3,000 a night. Under previous management, Sinatra had no limits on the amount of credit extended to him by the Sands casino. His IOUs, chits or "markers" were torn up at the end of Sinatra's engagements because he was considered to be good for business—bringing the hotel more monetary value than the worth of his gambling losses. Hughes put a stop to this system, telling Jack Entratter to inform Sinatra of the new policy; Entratter did not do so because he was afraid. (Note: Sinatra came to his September 1967 engagement at the Sands with the expectation that new owner Howard Hughes would relieve him of his ownership in the Cal Neva Lodge & Casino in Lake Tahoe. Sinatra had long wanted to sell his interest in the property and reasoned that since he was an asset to the Sands' business, Hughes would buy his Cal-Neva shares in the interest of keeping the star happy. Hughes declined to buy Sinatra's shares and would not acknowledge Sinatra's phone calls. An angry Sinatra left the hotel for his Palm Springs home and the Sands had no headlining star for its Labor Day weekend. Jack Entratter was able to get Sammy Davis Jr., Della Reese, Nancy Ames and other entertainers to fill in for the missing Sinatra. Sinatra returned to the Sands after the Labor Day weekend and promptly asked for US$1,000 credit, which was denied on orders of Hughes. At the time of the golf cart incident, Sinatra was aware that the practice of the Sands extending him credit had ended. After Sinatra signed a contract with Caesar's Palace, it was announced that Caesar's Palace had purchased the Sinatra Cal-Neva shares.) (Note: Frank Sinatra was not the first Rat Pack member to leave the Sands; Dean Martin signed a contract with The Riviera shortly after Hughes became the Sands' owner.)

Fuming, Sinatra began what The Los Angeles Times describes as a "weekend-long tirade" against the "hotel's management, employees and security forces." The FBI report says the incident began when Mia Farrow lost $20,000 at the Sands casino. Sinatra bought $50,000 in chips and made an attempt to win the money back. He lost this sum within a short period of time. Sinatra then asked for credit, which was denied. It culminated when Sinatra reportedly drove a golf cart through the window of the coffee shop where casino manager Carl Cohen was seated and began "screaming obscenities and anti-Semitic remarks" at Cohen. (Note: Sinatra also destroyed the Sands penthouse apartment he was staying in during his engagement there.) Sinatra reportedly punched Cohen, a heavily built man, who responded with a smack in the mouth, bloodying Sinatra's nose and knocking two of his teeth out. (Note: Entertainer Paul Anka, who is also the author of Sinatra's "signature song", My Way, was at the Sands at the time and witnessed the incident. His account describes Sinatra as having had too much to drink when he drove the golf cart into the plate glass window of the Sands; Sinatra's wife, Mia Farrow, was his passenger. Sinatra then tried to set fire to sofas and curtains in the hotel's lobby, but was not successful at starting a fire. When he was denied credit to continue gambling, Sinatra climbed onto a gaming table and declared that he would tear the hotel down to sand when he was done. Since this was taking place at around 1:30 am local time, casino manager Carl Cohen was awakened. Cohen went to the hotel's coffee shop where he hoped to reason with Sinatra. Sinatra became angry during Cohen's explanation and upset the table where Cohen was seated. Cohen was scalded with hot coffee and it was then that he punched Sinatra in the mouth.) As a result, Sinatra never performed at the Sands again while Hughes owned it, and began performing at Caesars Palace. A number of the staff were not disappointed to see Sinatra leave the Sands. Numerous employees had been humiliated or intimidated over the years, including a busboy Sinatra tripped while he was carrying a tray with dishes. (Note: Many newspapers printed editorials supportive of Carl Cohen's actions. The New Hampshire newspaper, The Portsmouth Herald ran an editorial entitled "Carl Cohen for President?") After Sinatra left, the mobsters pulled out of the Sands and gradually left Vegas in the 1970s. In the 1970s, it became associated with the likes of Wayne Newton and Liberace. At this time, some 30% of the performers at Sands were Italian Americans. Frank Gagliardi became the drummer for the house orchestra in 1964, starting a twelve-year tenure.

In 1968, Hughes stated that he intended to expand Sands into a 4,000-room resort, but his plans did not materialize. In 1980, Hughes' company, Summa Corporation, sold the Sands to the Pratt Corporation. Jack, Edward and Willian Pratt, said they would spend $40 million in renovating the Sands Hotel and expanding the rooms, casino and public area accommodations, but subsequently bought it back as they were unable to make a profit. MGM Grand, Inc. bought the hotel along with the neighboring Desert Inn in 1988 for a total of $167 million, and the property became known as the MGM Sands. The next year, MGM sold it for $110 million to Las Vegas Sands, a new company formed by the owners of The Interface Group, including Sheldon Adelson, Richard Katzeff, Ted Cutler, Irwin Chafetz and Jordan Shapiro. The same year, it was licensed by the Nevada Gaming Commission, and Adelson became a casino magnate. In 1990, Adelson built the Sands Expo, a 1-million-square-foot (93,000 m^{2}) convention centre. In 1991, The Sands produced a VHS tape titled "Sands at a Glance," which showcased the hotel's services and amenities and was hosted by Marianne Marks. According to the VHS tape, one of the most popular games in the Sands casino was Blackjack. This VHS video can be found posted on YouTube.

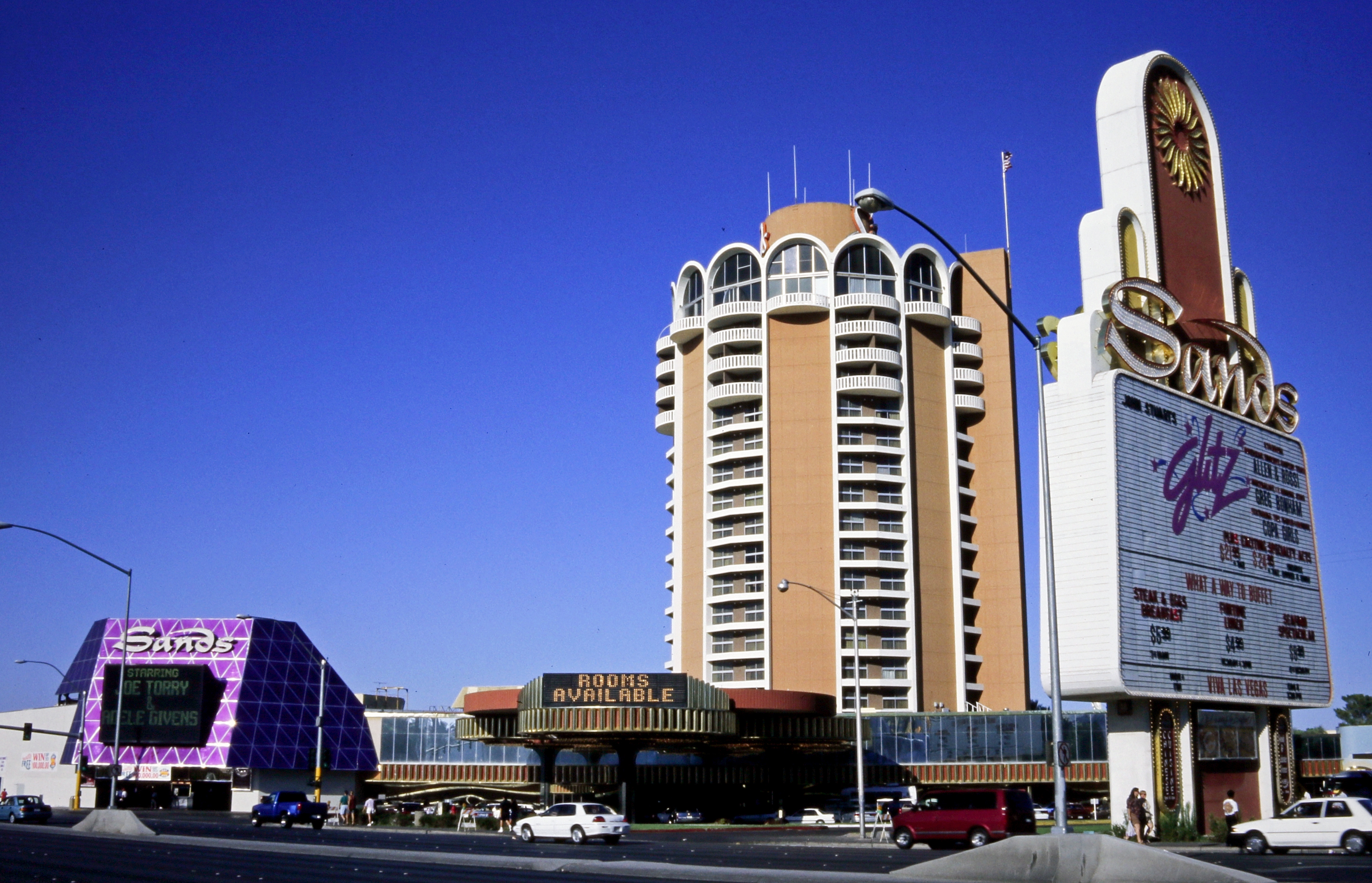
The Sands in 1995

In its final years, the Sands became a shadow of its former self—a throwback to the old days—and it ultimately could not compete with the newer and more exciting mega-resorts that were being built on the Strip. However, a 1990s travel guide stated that the hotel gardens and pool area still retained the ambiance of the classic Sands days. The decision was eventually made by its final owner, Sheldon Adelson, to shut it down and to build a brand new resort. The last dice in the casino was rolled by Bob Stupak just after 6:00 p.m. on June 30, 1996. At 2:06am on November 26, 1996, it was imploded and demolished, much to the dismay of longtime employees and sentimentalists. Footage of the demolition also appeared in the closing credits of The Cooler. The climactic plane crash in 1997's Con Air ended with the aircraft crashing into the soon-to-be-demolished Sands' lobby.

On May 3, 1999, the new $1.5 billion megaresort The Venetian opened where the Sands had formerly been, a 35-story hotel with 3,036 rooms, covering an area of 17 million ft^{2} (1.6 million m^{2}). It became the largest AAA Five-Diamond landmark in North America.

== Architecture ==
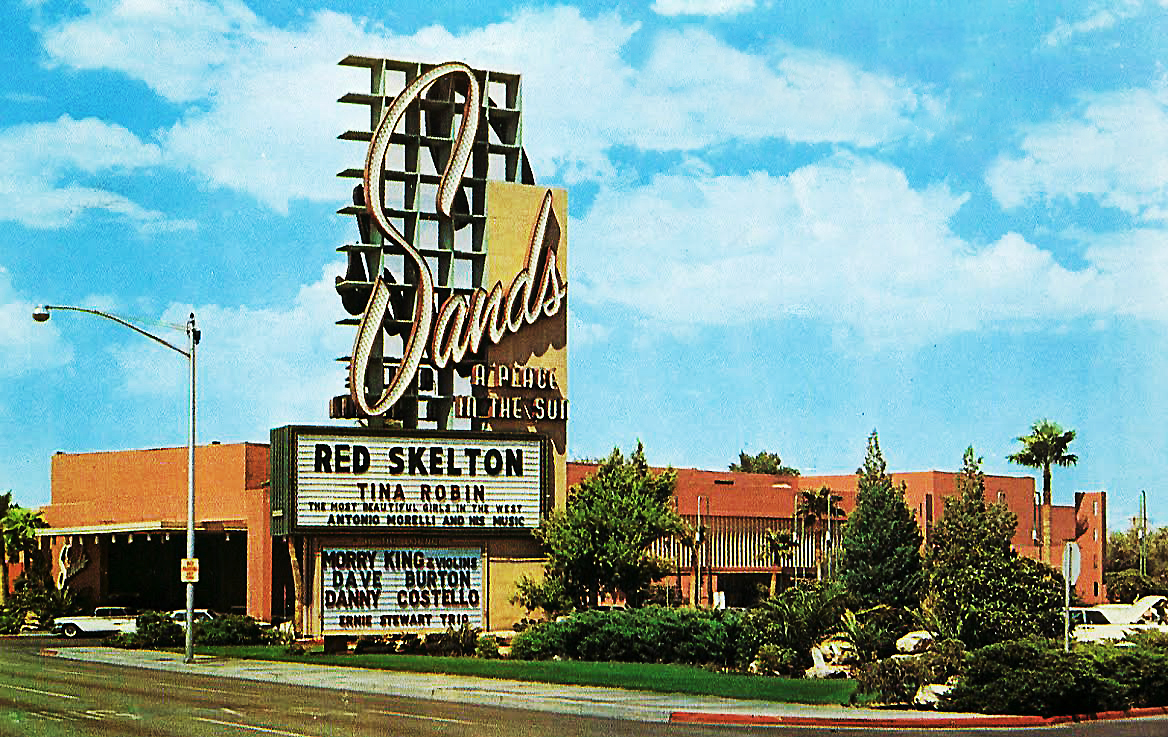
Sands Hotel and Casino in the early 1960s

=== Wayne McAllister design, 1952 ===
Wayne McAllister designed the original $5.5 million Sands Hotel, an exotic-looking terracotta red-painted modern hotel with a prominent porte cochère at the front, surrounded by a zig-zag wall ornamented with tiled planters. The hotel is arguably most associated with its 56 feet (17 m) high sign, made iconic with photographs of the Rat Pack standing underneath it. The name "Sands", written in elegant italics, featured a 36 feet (11 m) high letter "S", and the name was sprawled across an egg crate grill, cantilevered from a pillar. The sign was receptive to the light and shadow of the desert, and during night time it was lit up, glowing neon red. It was the tallest sign on the strip for a number of years. Beneath "Sands" was the tagline "A Place in the Sun", written in smaller capital letters. Below that was the billing of the names of the performers appearing at Sands, very often photographed displaying names such as Frank Sinatra, Dean Martin, Jerry Lewis, Sammy Davis Jr. and Red Skelton in the late 1950s and early 1960s. Author Alan Hess wrote that the "sleek Modernism of the Sands leaped past the Flamingo to set a higher standard of sophistication for Las Vegas. For the first time, the sign was an integral part of the architectural design."

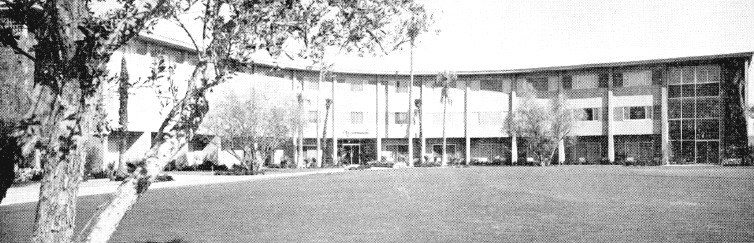
The Aqueduct building in 1963

The porte-cochère of the hotel featured three great sharp-edged pillars jutting out in front of the glass-fronted building, angling down into the ground, which resembled fins. The two-story glass walled entry was bordered by a wall of imported Italian marble, and above the entrance area was a horizontal plane with copper lights suspended from the beams. Rather than being polished, the marble was unusual in that it was rough and grained. Natural and stained cork was used throughout the building. A.J. Leibling of The New Yorker described the hotel in 1953: "The main building of the Sands is a great rectangular hall, with the reception desk in one corner, slot machines along one long wall and a bar and cocktail lounge, complete with Latin trio, along the opposite wall. In the middle is a jumble of roulette and craps tables and 21 layouts." The casino, of substantial size, was accessed by three sets of terrazzo stairs and was lit by low-hanging chandeliers. The bar featured bas-reliefs with a Western theme, including cowboys, racing wagons and Joshua trees, designed by Allan Stewart of Claremont College, California. The Garden Room restaurant overlooked the hotel's pool and landscaped grounds.

The guest rooms were located in a group of stand-alone, two-storey buildings. There were six 40-room, 168' by 59'6 blocks – named after the racetracks Arlington, Belmont, Santa Anita, Rockingham, Bay Meadows, and Hialeah – and one double-long block named Churchill Downs. Each block had a white Bermuda roof with a 3/12 pitch. The blocks were arranged in a Y formation. Rooms were designed and furnished by Barker Bros. of Los Angeles. Later in the 1950s, the additional bedroom blocks Hollywood Park and Garden State were built. The suites were luxuriously designed. Plush blue carpets and ivory-colored chairs with white ceilings were the norm in the early days. An electric tram service, often attended by pretty showgirls, took the guests to their rooms. In 1963, a new bedroom building, named the Aqueduct, was constructed. The Aqueduct was crescent shaped and was three storeys high, 275' long, and '70 wide. The architect of the new block was Julius Gabrielle, and furnishings were provided by the Albert Parvin Company of Los Angeles. Dick Wells, a Parvin employee, designed the suites.

=== Martin Stern rebuild, 1964 ===
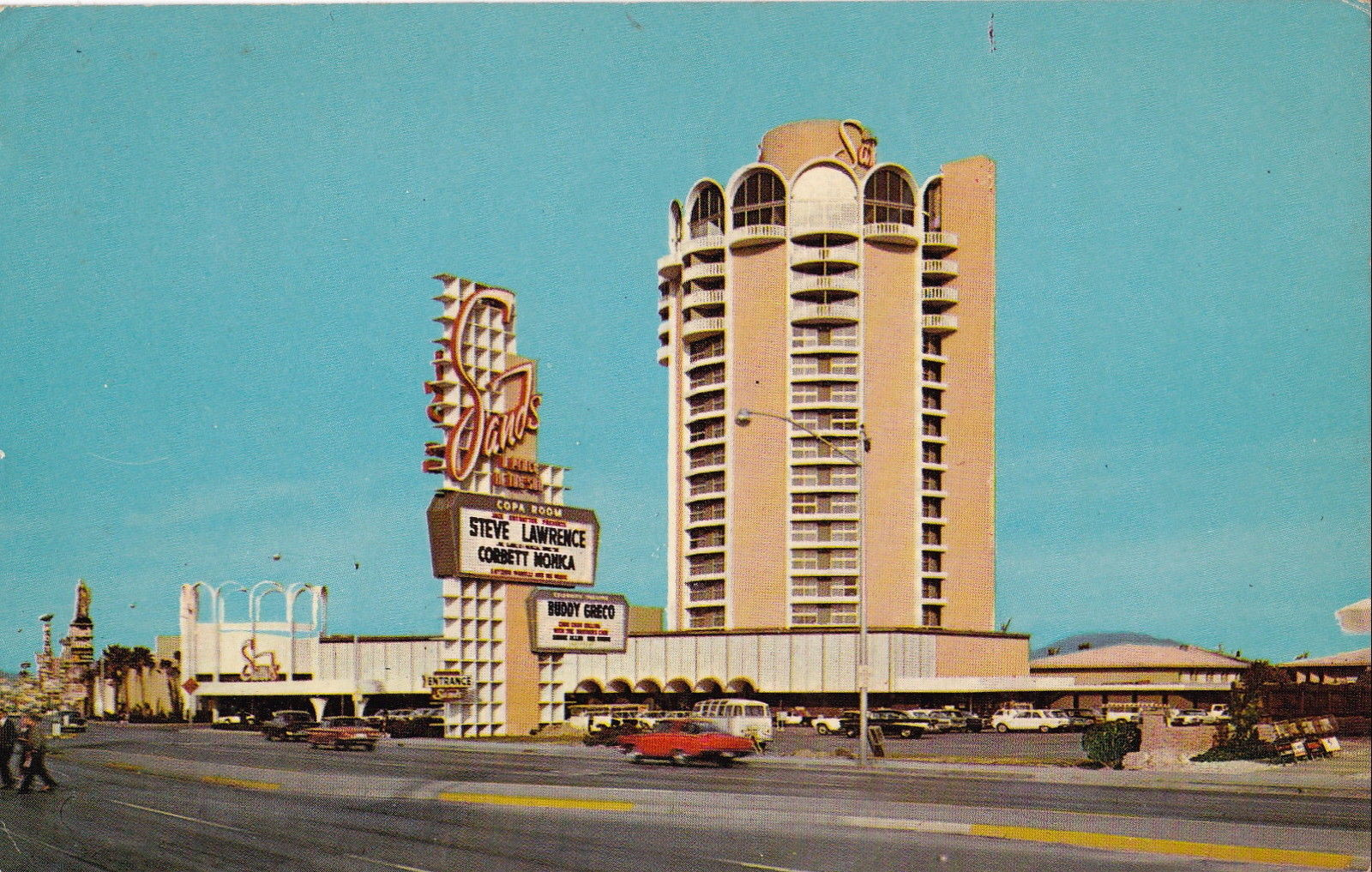
Martin Stern Jr.'s rebuilt Sands in the late 1960s

In 1963, Martin Stern Jr. was hired to design a major overhaul of the hotel. Stern's plan amounted to an almost total rebuild of the main building and erased most of the defining features of McAllister's original design. To expand the main building, the Arlington and Belmont blocks were lifted and moved southwards. Stern's plans were completed by the fall of 1964. The rebuild included the addition of a convention hall, an entrance rotunda, new restaurants, and a 17-storey tower. Stern's design employed a prominent arch motif in the tower and the hotel façade. Construction of the tower commenced in late 1965, and was completed in 1967. It existed until November 1996 when it was demolished.

The steam room of the hotel was a place of relaxation and good jest. It became a great place for socializing between the stars after 5 pm, including the Rat Pack, and Jerry Lewis, Steve Lawrence and Don Rickles. On one occasion they were having problems with the TV in the massage room, which was blurry and out of focus. Sinatra yelled "Move back, move back", and the television was thrown into the pool. Manager Entratter permitted such activities, knowing that if he scolded Sinatra and asked him to pay damages, he would not perform at Sands again.

=== Copa Room ===
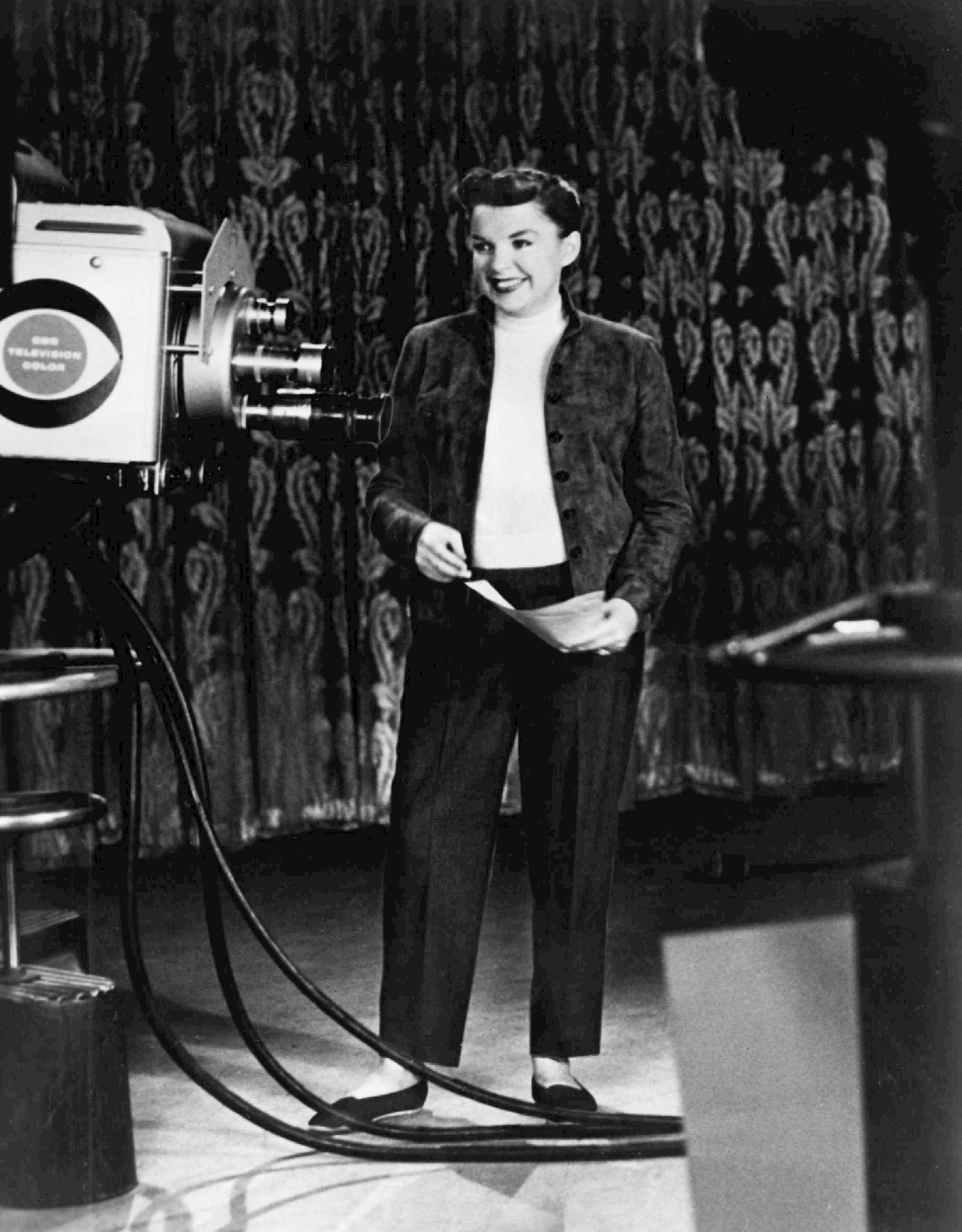
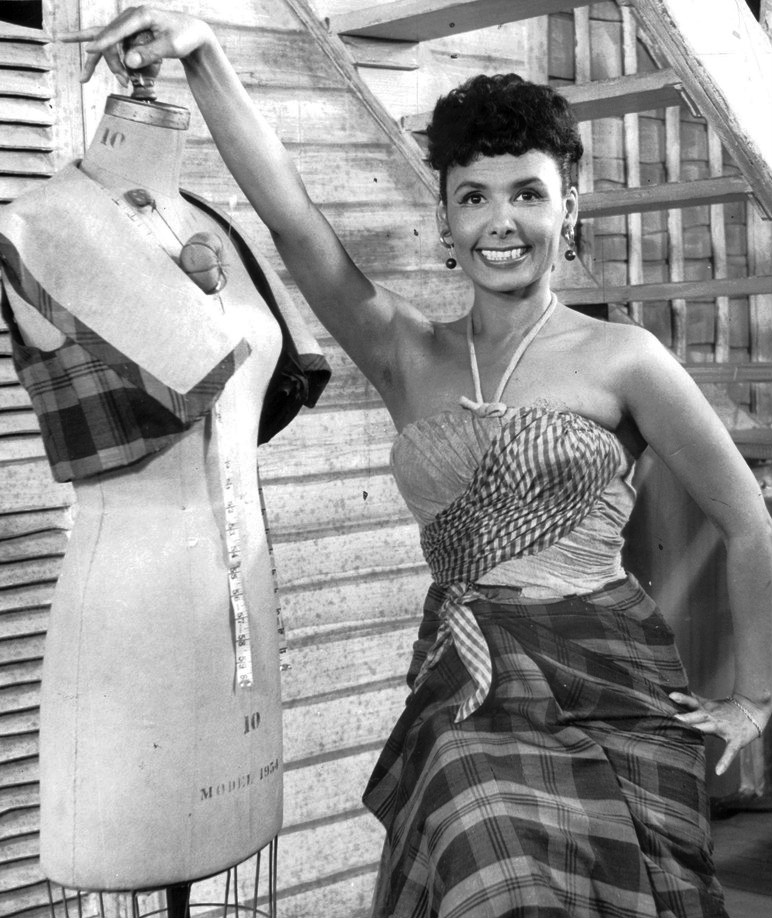
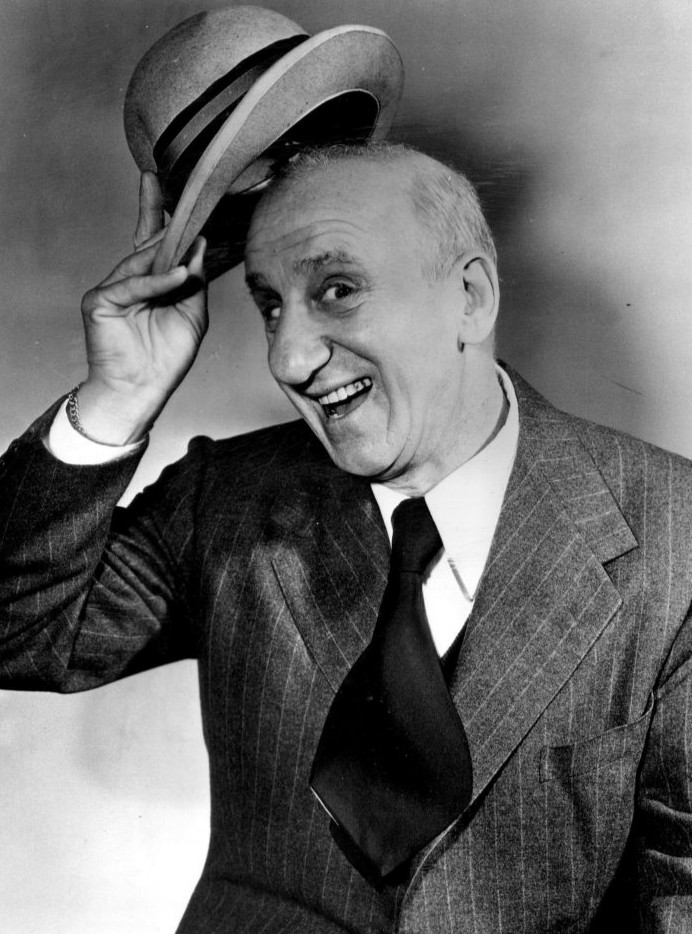
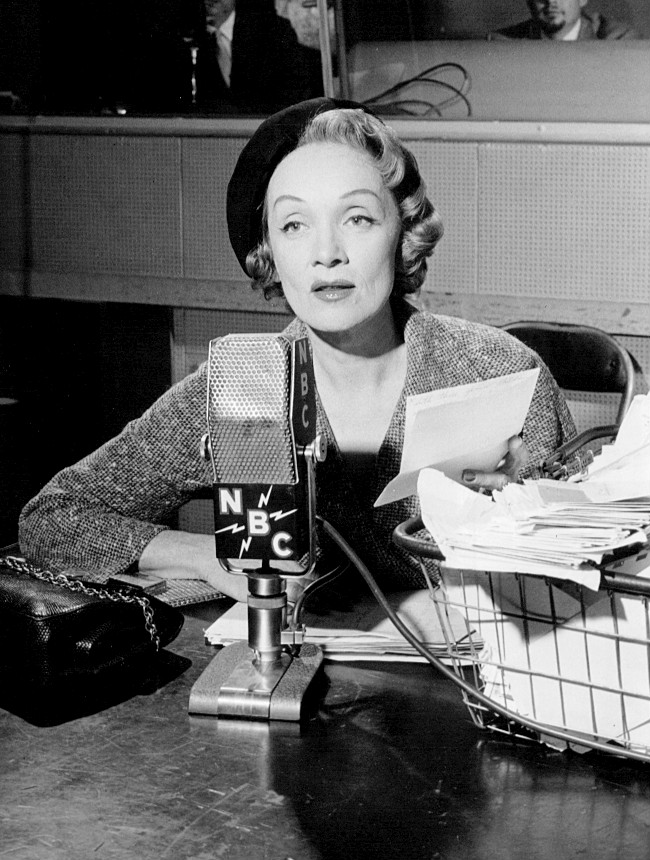
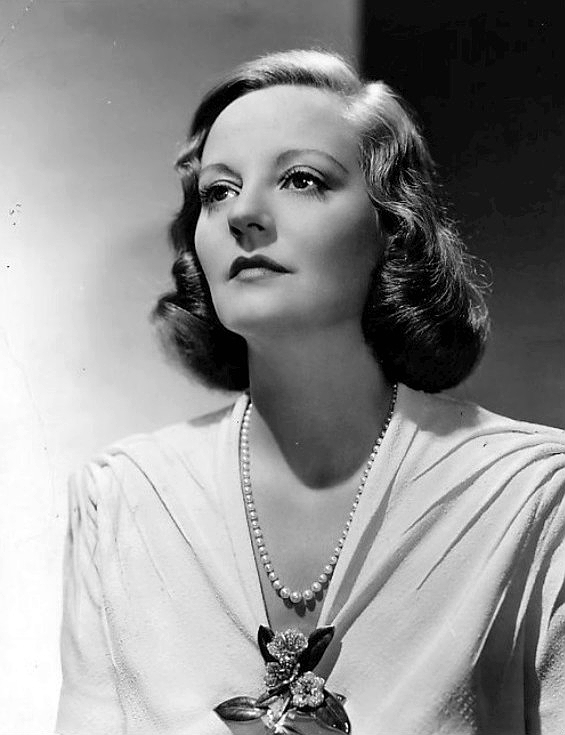
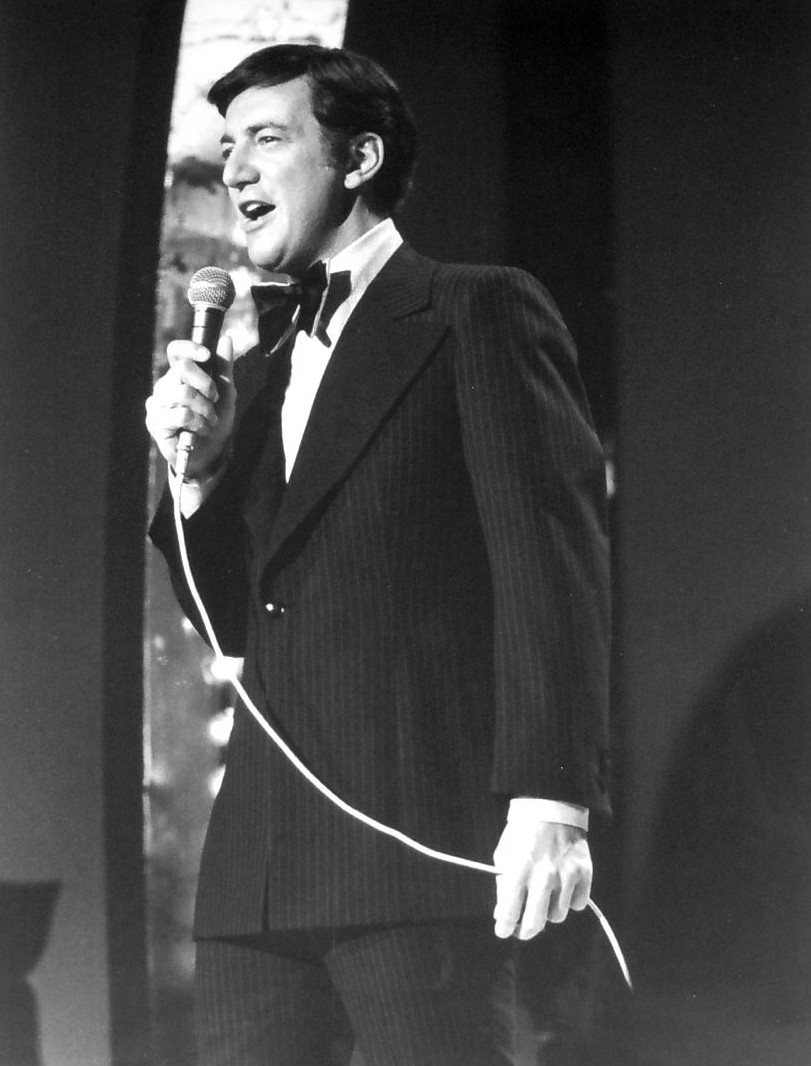
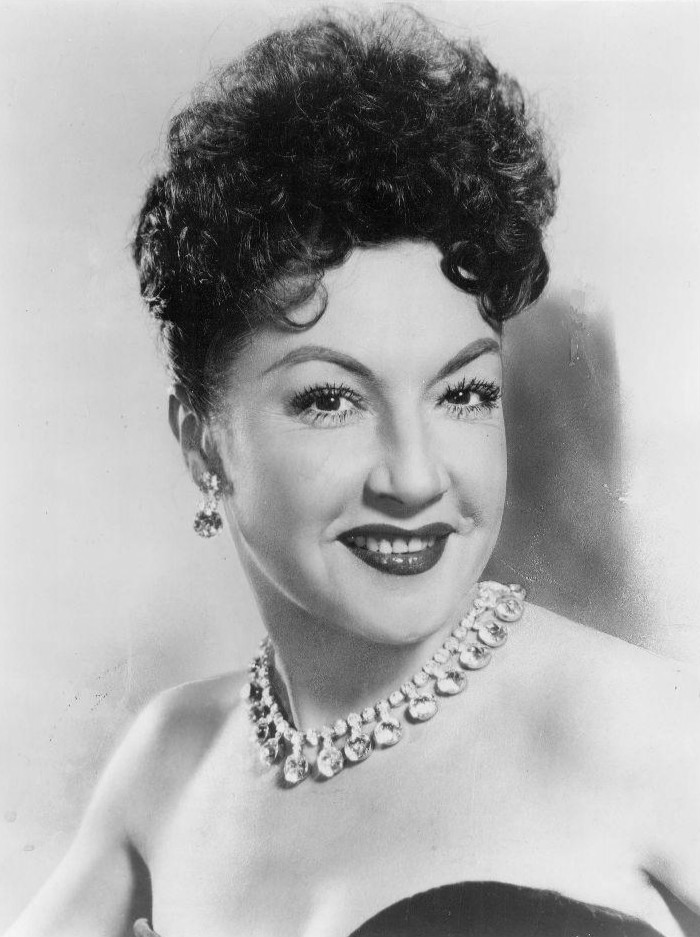
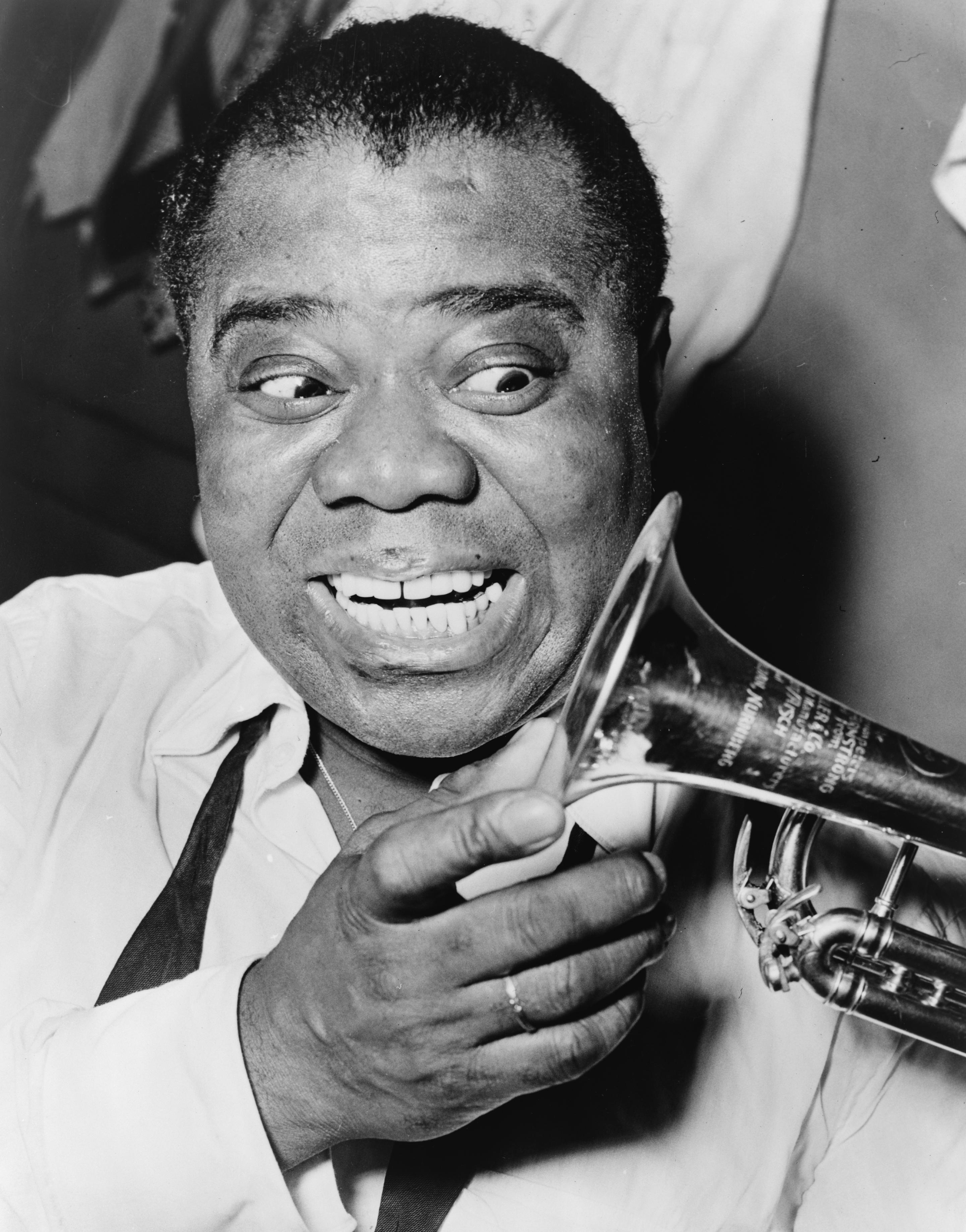
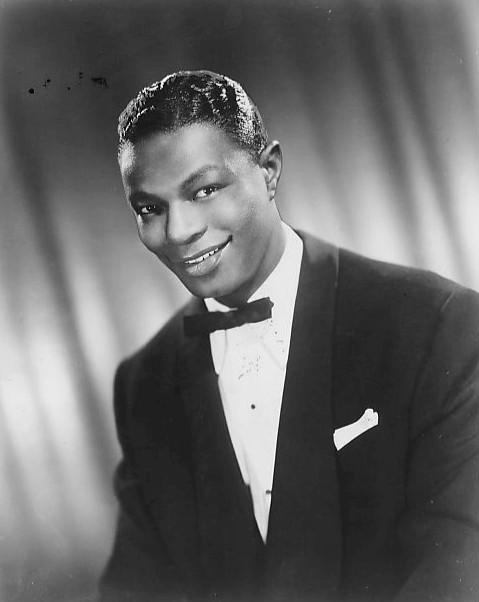
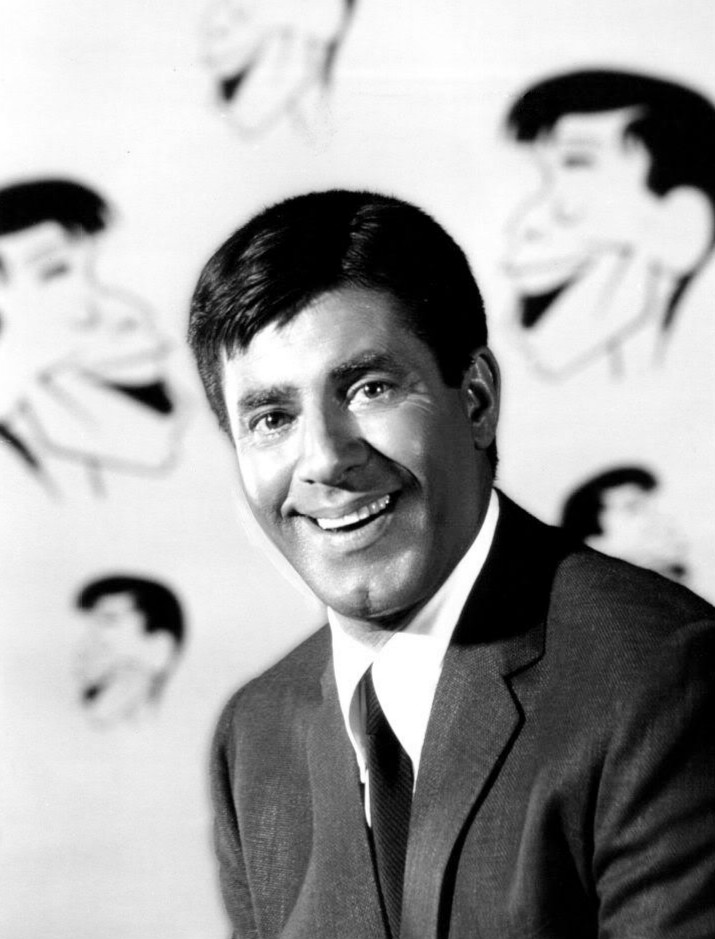
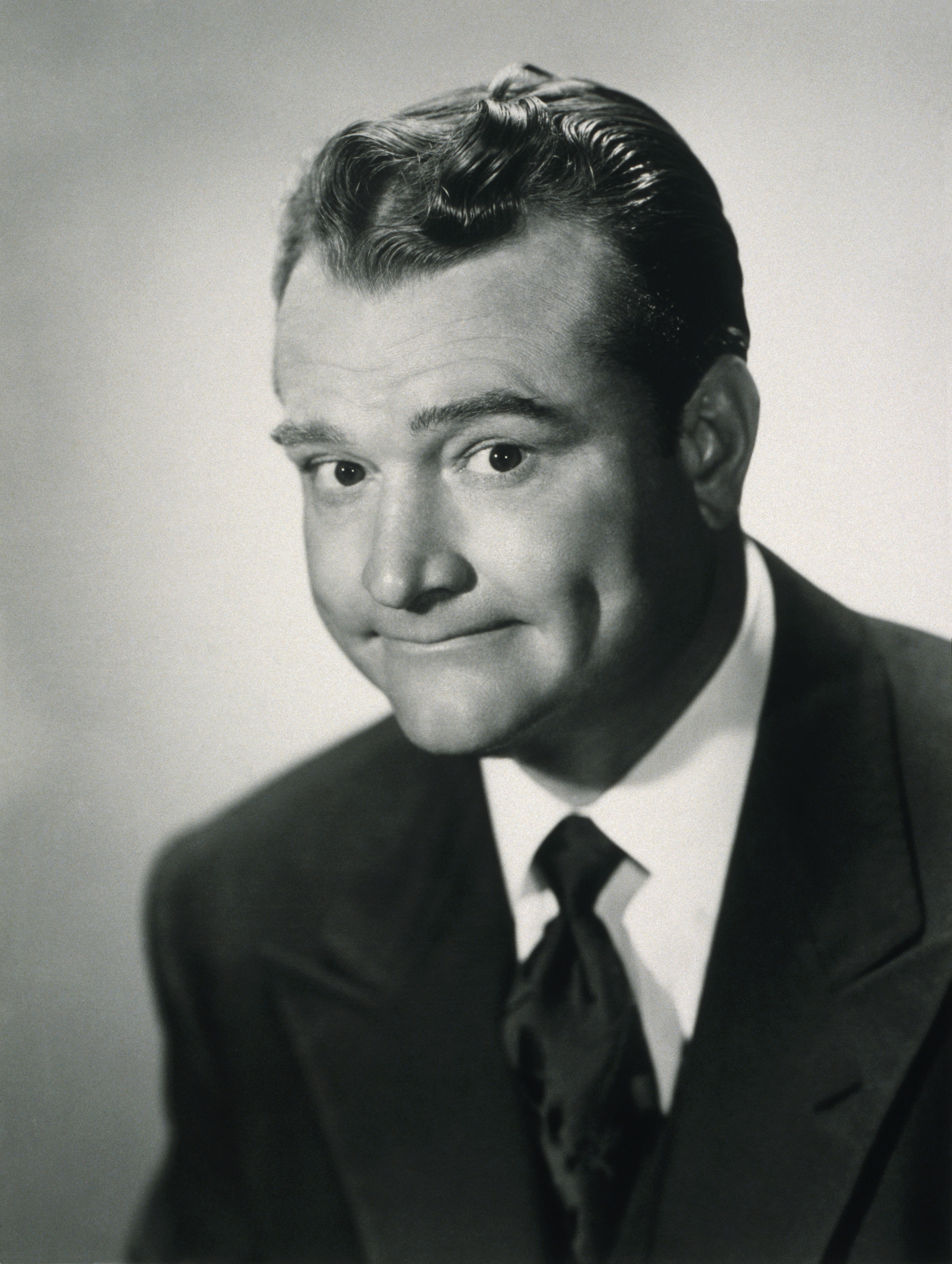
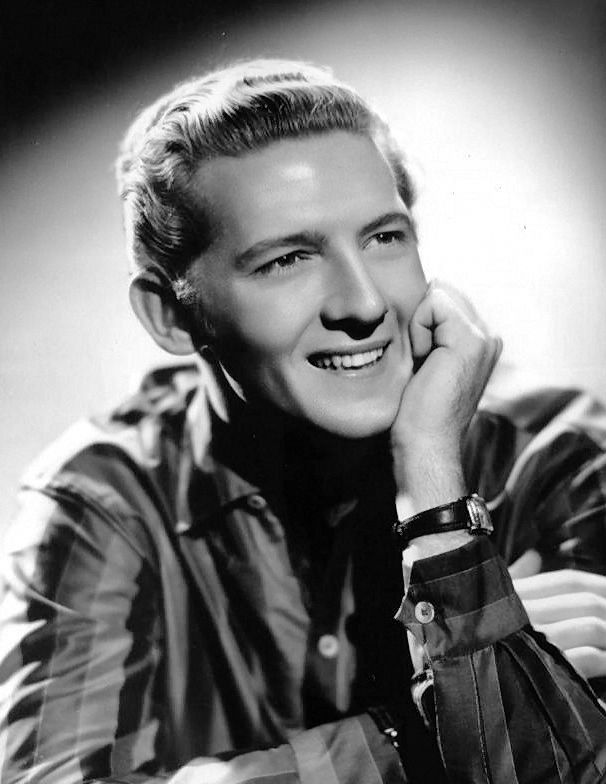
Sands Copa Room stars: Top from left: Judy Garland, Lena Horne, Jimmy Durante. Middle from left: Marlene Dietrich, Tallulah Bankhead, Bobby Darin. Middle from left: Ethel Merman, Louis Armstrong, Nat King Cole. Bottom from left: Jerry Lewis, Red Skelton, Jerry Lee Lewis

The Copa Room was the showroom of Sands, named after the famed Copacabana Club in New York City. It contained 385 seats, designed in a Brazilian carnival style. Some of the more famed singers like Frank Sinatra, Dean Martin, and Sammy Davis Jr. had to sign contracts to ensure that they headline for a given number of weeks a year. Performers were extremely well paid for the period. It was common for some of them to be paid $25,000 per week, playing two shows a night, six days a week, and once on a Sunday for two to three weeks.

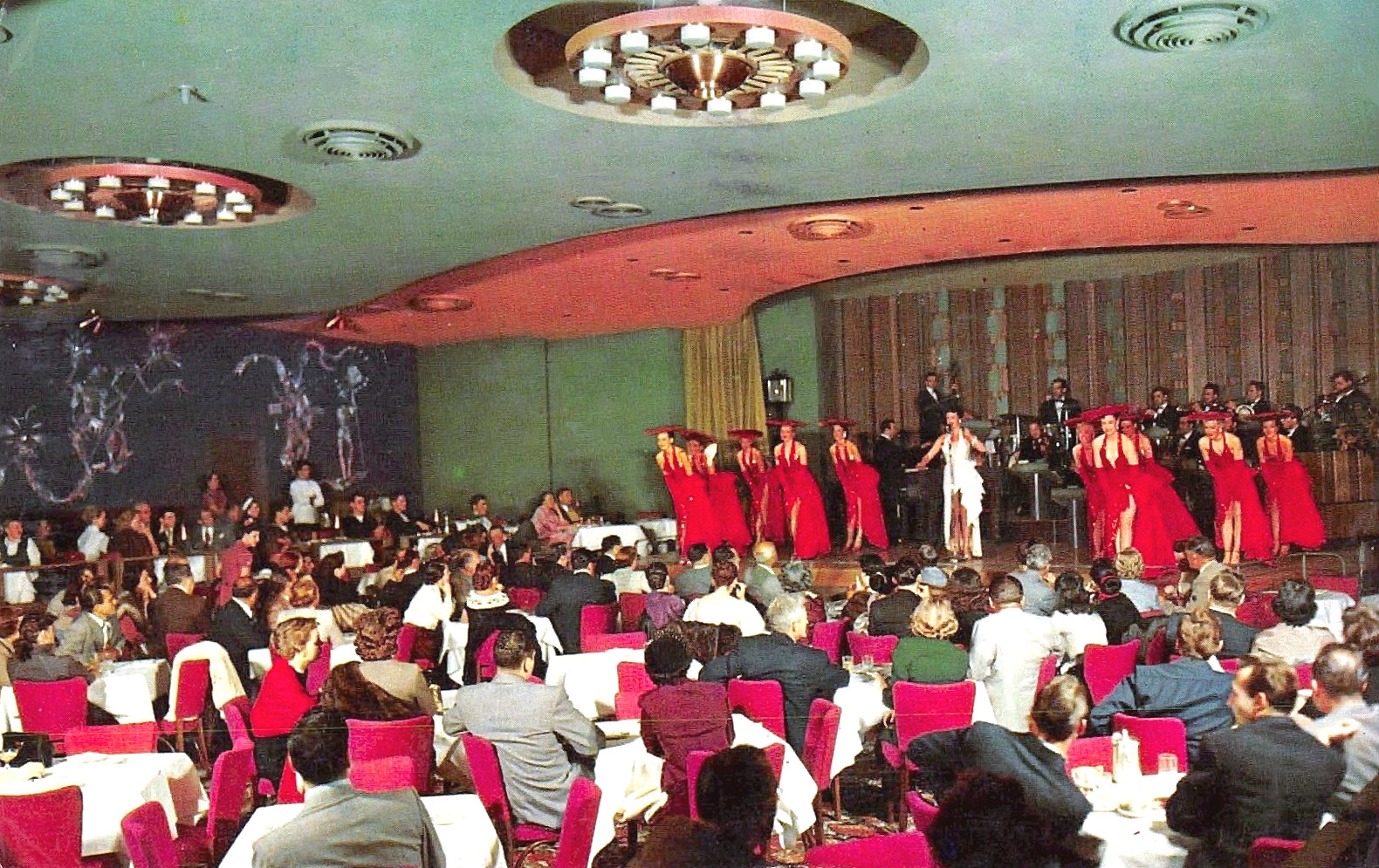
The Copa Room

The greatest names in the entertainment industry graced the stage of the Copa Room. Notable performers included Judy Garland, Lena Horne (one of the first black performers at the hotel, billed as "The Satin Doll"), Jimmy Durante, Dean Martin, Pat Cooper, Shirley MacLaine, Marlene Dietrich, Tallulah Bankhead, Shecky Greene, Martin and Lewis, Danny Thomas, Bobby Darin, Ethel Merman, Rich Little, Louis Armstrong, Jerry Lee Lewis, Patti Page, French singer Edith Piaf, Nat King Cole, Robert Merrill, Wayne Newton, Red Skelton, and "The Copa Girls". Hollywood celebrities such as Humphrey Bogart and Lauren Bacall, Elizabeth Taylor, Yul Brynner, Kirk Douglas, Lucille Ball and Rosalind Russell were often photographed enjoying the headline acts.

A number of notable albums were recorded in the Copa Room. Among them are Dean Martin's Live At The Sands – An Evening of Music, Laughter and Hard Liquor, Frank Sinatra's Sinatra at the Sands, and Sammy Davis, Jr.'s The Sounds of '66 and That's All!. The Rat Pack: Live at the Sands, a CD released in 2001, features Martin, Sinatra and Davis in a live performance at the hotel recorded in September 1963. Live at the Sands is an album featuring Mary Wilson, formerly of The Supremes. Morrissey's B-side track, "At Amber" (1990), takes place at the Sands Hotel, and recounts its by-then aging and somewhat seedy atmosphere. Much of the musical success of the Copa Room is credited to the room's band leader and musical conductor Antonio Morelli. Morelli not only acted as the band leader and musical conductor for the Copa Room during the hotel's Rat Pack heyday in the 1950s and 1960s, but he also served in that role on hundreds of recorded albums by those same entertainers who graced the stage of the Copa. Often the festivities would carry over after hours to Morrelli's home in Las Vegas, nicknamed "The Morelli House", which was eventually relocated and sanctioned an historical landmark by the State of Nevada.

=== Silver Queen Lounge ===
The Silver Queen Lounge was another performing venue at Sands, with nightly acts starting at 5 pm and running until 6 am. It was particularly popular with the emerging rock 'n' roll crowd. The Sands is where Freddie Bell and the Bell Boys performed the rock 'n' roll-song "Hound Dog", seen by Elvis Presley. After Presley saw that performance at The Sands, he decided to record the song himself, and it became a hit for him. Roberta Linn and the Melodaires and Gene Vincent were also regular performers.

== See also ==
- Sands Macao

== Sources ==
- Anka, Paul; Dalton, David (2013). My Way: An Autobiography. Macmillan. ISBN 978-1-2500-3520-2.
- Bakish, David (December 1, 1994). Jimmy Durante: His Show Business Career, with an Annotated Filmography and Discography. McFarland. ISBN 978-0-7864-3022-2.
- Bakken, Gordon Morris (October 4, 2010). The World of the American West. Routledge. ISBN 978-1-136-93160-4.
- Balboni, Alan Richard; Edwards, Jerome E. (2006). Beyond the Mafia: Italian Americans and the Development of Las Vegas. University of Nevada Press. ISBN 978-0-87417-681-0.
- Block, Marcelline (2011). World Film Locations: Las Vegas. Intellect Books. ISBN 978-1-84150-588-6.
- Clarke, Norm (January 8, 2004). Vegas Confidential: Norm Clarke! Sin City's Ace Insider 1,000 Naked Truths. Stephens Press, LLC. ISBN 978-1-932173-26-0.
- Consiglio, Tony; Douskey, Franz (October 20, 2011). Sinatra and Me: The Very Good Years. Tantor eBooks. ISBN 978-1-61803-025-2.
- Farren, Mick (2004). Gene Vincent: There's One in Every Town. Do-Not Press. ISBN 978-1-904316-37-4.
- Fishgall, Gary (June 15, 2010). Gonna Do Great Things: The Life of Sammy Davis, Jr. Simon and Schuster. ISBN 978-1-4391-3157-2.
- Fodor's (February 28, 1995). Las Vegas, Reno, Tahoe '95: With Gambling Tips and Trips to Lake Mead and the Mountains. Fodor's Travel Publications. ISBN 978-0-679-02730-0.
- Fry, Colin (November 25, 2011). The Krays - The Final Countdown: The Ultimate Biography Of Ron, Reg And Charlie Kray. Mainstream Publishing. ISBN 978-1-78057-396-0.
- Gavin, James (June 23, 2009). Stormy Weather: The Life of Lena Horne. Simon and Schuster. p. 242. ISBN 978-1-4391-6425-9.
- Gehring, Wes (2008). Red Skelton: The Mask Behind the Mask. Indiana Historical Society. ISBN 978-0-87195-275-2.
- Gubler, Fritz (2008). Waldorf Hysteria: Hotel Manners, Misbehaviour & Minibars. Great, Grand & Famous Hotels. ISBN 978-0-9804667-1-3.
- Hawks, John; Higgins, Tom (February 3, 2009). The Complete Idiot's Guide to Las Vegas. DK Publishing. ISBN 978-1-4406-8519-4.
- Hess, Alan (July 1, 1993). Viva Las Vegas: After-Hours Architecture. Chronicle Books. ISBN 978-0-8118-0111-9.
- Holden, Wendy (June 23, 2015). The Beat of My Own Drum: A Memoir. Simon and Schuster. ISBN 978-1-4767-1496-7.
- Humble, John Kenneth; Baldwin, Gordon (2007). A Place in the Sun: Photographs of Los Angeles. Getty Publications. ISBN 978-0-89236-881-5.
- James, Ronald Michael (2009). Nevada's Historic Buildings: A Cultural Legacy. University of Nevada Press. ISBN 978-0-87417-798-5.
- Jones, Delilah (1995). Viva Las Vegas: Nightclub Greats. Friedman/Fairfax Publishers. ISBN 978-1-56799-233-5.
- Land, Barbara; Land, Myrick (2004). A Short History of Las Vegas. University of Nevada Press. ISBN 978-0-87417-564-6.
- Lewis, Georgia; Davis, Nell (1979). Las Vegas...the way it was: diary of a pioneer Las Vegas woman. Las Vegas Sun.
- MacKenzie, Alex (2009). The Life and Times of the Motown Stars. Together Publications LLP. ISBN 978-1-84226-014-2.
- McCracken, Robert D. (1997). Las Vegas: The Great American Playground. University of Nevada Press. ISBN 978-0-87417-301-7.
- Newton, Wayne; Maurice, Dick (June 1, 1991). Once Before I Go. Avon. ISBN 978-0-380-71405-6.
- Nichols, Chris (January 2007). The Leisure Architecture of Wayne McAllister. Gibbs Smith. ISBN 978-1-58685-699-1.
- Papa, Paul W. (October 1, 2009). It Happened in Las Vegas: Remarkable Events that Shaped History. Rowman & Littlefield. ISBN 978-0-7627-5819-7.
- Randlett, Victoria Schurz (1999), Atomic Oasis: Las Vegas in Its Golden Age, 1946-1958, University of California, Berkeley
- Raymond, Emilie (June 1, 2015). Stars for Freedom: Hollywood, Black Celebrities, and the Civil Rights Movement. University of Washington Press. ISBN 978-0-295-80607-5.
- Roggen, Ted (November 1, 2001). Press Releases. iUniverse. ISBN 978-0-595-20359-8.
- Roman, James (October 1, 2011). Chronicles of Old Las Vegas: Exposing Sin City's High-Stakes History. Museyon. ISBN 978-1-938450-02-0.
- Rose, Frank (1996). The Agency: William Morris and the Hidden History of Show Business. Frank Rose. ISBN 978-0-88730-807-9.
- Schwartz, David G. (August 21, 2013). Suburban Xanadu: The Casino Resort on the Las Vegas Strip and Beyond. Routledge. ISBN 978-1-136-75741-9.
- Sheehan, Jack (January 1, 1992). Las Vegas, southern Nevada: hometown living Las Vegas style : Las Vegas stories. Pioneer Publications. ISBN 978-1-881547-15-0.
- Sheehan, Jack (1997). The Players: The Men who Made Las Vegas. University of Nevada Press. p. 12. ISBN 978-0-87417-306-2.
- Sheldon, Sidney (2005). The Other Side of Me. HarperCollins. ISBN 978-0-00-716517-9.
- Sheridan, John Harris (September 6, 2011). Howard Hughes: The Las Vegas Years: The Women, the Mormons, the Mafia. AuthorHouse. ISBN 978-1-4634-0693-6.
- Starr, Michael Seth (March 2011). Bobby Darin: A Life. Taylor Trade Publications. ISBN 978-1-58979-598-3.
- Thompson, William N. (February 28, 2015). Gambling in America: An Encyclopedia of History, Issues, and Society. ABC-CLIO. ISBN 978-1-61069-980-8.
- Vermilye, Jerry (1992). The Complete Films of Marlene Dietrich. Carol Publishing Group. ISBN 978-0-8065-1354-6.
- Willems, Jos (April 30, 2006). All of Me: The Complete Discography of Louis Armstrong. Scarecrow Press. ISBN 978-1-4616-5622-7.
