= Antonio Morelli =

- Also known as: Tony Morelli
- Born: July 22, 1904; Rochester, New York
- Origin: Rochester, New York, Erie, Pennsylvania, United States, Milan, Italy
- Died: June 17, 1974; Las Vegas, Nevada
- Genres: Big Band
- Occupation(s): Musical Conductor, Musician, Bandleader, Producer, Arranger

Antonio Morelli (1904-1974) was a producer, arranger, bandleader, movie producer, and conductor most well known for serving as orchestra leader for the famous Sands Hotel Copa Room in its Rat Pack heyday from 1954 through 1971. He was music director, band leader, and friend to some of the biggest names in show business for twenty years and is credited with bringing classical music to Las Vegas. He was also a songwriter, arranger, and music director for several Broadway musicals, and beloved for his devotion to philanthropic endeavors in his community most notably founding The Las Vegas Pops.

== Musical legacy ==
Dean Martin ("Live At The Sands - An Evening of Music, Laughter and Hard Liquor") Frank Sinatra (Sinatra at the Sands), Sammy Davis Jr. (The Sounds of '66, That's All!), Tommy Sands, Nat King Cole and Count Basie (a posthumous set, also recorded during the Sinatra at the Sands stand) were among those who recorded live albums at the Sands. The albums feature credits to many of the legendary musicians who performed on the albums and at the Copa Room and to band leader, producer, and musical conductor Antonio Morelli who appeared on hundreds of such albums by these artists throughout the 1950s and 60s.

The greatest names in the entertainment industry graced the Copa Room Stage (the showroom at the Sands, named after the famed Copacabana Club in New York City) including Judy Garland, Lena Horne, (she was billed at the Sands as "The Satin Doll") Jimmy Durante, Marlene Dietrich, Tallulah Bankhead, Bobby Darin, Dean Martin and Jerry Lewis, along with "The Copa Girls". These were only a few of the legendary entertainers to not only perform at the Sands, but in all the showrooms along the Strip, from the late 1940s until the early 1990s. The public could sit ringside in a showroom holding no more than five hundred, paying as little as three dollars in the 50s up to $25.50 in the early 90s for the likes of Liza Minnelli, Shirley MacLaine and Diana Ross. Much of the musical success of the Copa Room is credited to the room's band leader and musical conductor Antonio Morelli. Morelli not only acted as the band leader and musical conductor for the Copa Room during the Hotel's Rat Pack heyday in the 1950s and 60s, he also played that role on hundreds of recorded albums by those same entertainers who graced the stage of the Copa including Frank Sinatra, Sammy Davis Jr., Tony Bennett, Dean Martin, and many others. Often the festivities would carry over after hours to Morrelli's home in Las Vegas, nicknamed "The Morelli House, which was eventually relocated and sanctioned an historical landmark by the State of Nevada.

The house is famous for being the home of Sands Hotel band leader and musical conductor Antonio Morelli and his wife Helen during the Rat Pack heyday of the 1950s and 60s. For thirty years it served as an after-hours congregating spot for some of the biggest names in entertainment including Frank Sinatra, Sammy Davis Jr., Dean Martin, Tony Bennett, Nat King Cole, Judy Garland, and many other famous names in show business. Morelli was very active in music circles in Nevada and he and his wife were also very active in various charitable causes through the years. The house also has great significance for its mid-century modern architecture and because it was the only remaining home from the Desert Inn Estates, the community demolished to make way for the Wynn Las Vegas resort.

"Every city in the late '50s all had major nightclub entertainment," said Frank Leone, president of the Musicians Union of Las Vegas, Local 369, AFM. "Playing the Sands was the pinnacle of an entertainer's career. Only the best musicians were in Morelli's orchestra. Partly, that's what makes it such a historically significant era in this town. This performance will be a celebration of the birth of that kind of entertainment and the history of Las Vegas."

Not only did the musical legacy of Antonio Morelli live on in the preservation and designation of his home as an historical landmark, and through hundreds of recorded albums, but through his blood line as well. Morelli is the great-uncle of contemporary singer-songwriter and recording artist Ed Hale who often cites the influence and impact that his "Uncle Tony" had on him as a very young child in relation to music.
