= H. Lee Barnes =

American writer (born 1941)

H. Lee Barnes (born March 15, 1944) is an American writer. He was inducted into the Nevada Writers Hall of Fame in 2009.

== Early life and military service ==
Barnes was born in Moscow, Idaho. He served in the United States Army Special Forces during the Vietnam War.

== Law enforcement and other work ==
After his military service, Barnes worked as a deputy sheriff in Clark County from 1966 to 1972, and as a narcotics agent for the Nevada Division of Narcotics in Reno from 1973 to 1976.

== Education and teaching ==
Barnes graduated from the University of Nevada, Las Vegas in 1989. He received an MFA in creative writing from Arizona State University. He later taught English and creative writing at the College of Southern Nevada.

== Writing ==
Barnes's writing primarily deals with working-class characters from the American West and Southwest.

In the late 1970s Barnes wrote a book about the Vietnam war titled Scriptures, but was unable to find a publisher. He later revisited some of the themes from that book in Gunning for Ho: Vietnam Stories (2000), a collection of short stories that was compared to the writing of Robert Olen Butler, Tim O'Brien, andW. D. Ehrhart.

The Gambler's Apprentice (2016) is a Western set in Texas.

Life Is a Country Western Song (2019), is a collection of short stories.

Emerald City Blues (2025) follows Eve Halvers, a young woman from the Palouse region of Washington who moves to Los Angeles for factory work during World War II.

== Books ==
- Gunning for Ho: Vietnam Stories (University of Nevada Press, 2000; 25th anniversary edition, 2026)
- Dummy Up and Deal: Inside the Culture of Casino Dealing (University of Nevada Press, 2002)
- The Lucky (University of Nevada Press, 2003)
- Talk to Me, James Dean (Stephens Press, 2003)
- When We Walked Above the Clouds (University of Nebraska Press, 2011)
- Cold Deck (University of Nevada Press, 2013)
- The Gambler's Apprentice (University of Nevada Press, 2016)
- Life Is a Country Western Song (Baobab Press, 2019)
- Emerald City Blues (University of Nevada Press, 2025)
