= 1963 Masters Tournament =

- Front cover of the 1963 Masters Guide

Tournament information
- Dates: April 4–7, 1963
- Location: Augusta, Georgia; 33.503°N 82.020°W
- Course: Augusta National Golf Club
- Organized by: Augusta National Golf Club
- Tour: PGA Tour

Statistics
- Par: 72
- Length: 6,850 yards (6,264 m)
- Field: 84 players, 50 after cut
- Cut: 152 (+8)
- Prize fund: $112,500
- Winner's share: $20,000

Champion
- (United States) Jack Nicklaus
- 286 (−2)

Location map
- Location in the United States Location in Georgia

The 1963 Masters Tournament was the 27th Masters Tournament, held April 4–7 at Augusta National Golf Club in Augusta, Georgia. 84 players entered the tournament and 50 made the cut at eight-over-par (152).

Jack Nicklaus, 23, won the first of his record six Green Jackets with a three-foot (0.9 m) par putt on the final hole to finish one stroke ahead of runner-up Tony Lema. Nicklaus shot a 66 (−6) in the second round, which was key in his victory. It was the second of his record 18 major titles; his third came three months later at the PGA Championship in July.

Gene Sarazen, the 1935 champion, made the cut at Augusta for the final time at age 61 and finished 49th.

It was the last Masters for Horton Smith, winner of the inaugural event in 1934 and again in 1936. He was the only competitor to have participated in every edition of the tournament, and had a lung removed in 1957. Battling Hodgkin's Disease, Smith was partly aided by a golf cart and shot 91 and 86; he died six months later in Detroit at age 55, shortly after attending the Ryder Cup matches in Atlanta.

George Bayer won the Par 3 contest with a score of 23.

== Field ==
1. Masters champions

Jack Burke Jr. (4), Jimmy Demaret (8), Doug Ford (4,9,10,11), Claude Harmon, Herman Keiser, Cary Middlecoff (2), Byron Nelson, Arnold Palmer (2,3,8,9,11), Henry Picard, Gary Player (3,4,9,10), Gene Sarazen, Horton Smith, Sam Snead (8), Art Wall Jr. (9,11), Craig Wood

- Ralph Guldahl and Ben Hogan (2,3) did not play.

The following categories only apply to Americans

2. U.S. Open champions (last 10 years)

Tommy Bolt, Billy Casper (8,11), Jack Fleck (8,10), Ed Furgol, Gene Littler (8,9,11), Dick Mayer, Jack Nicklaus (8,9,10)

3. The Open champions (last 10 years)

4. PGA champions (last 10 years)

Jerry Barber (8,11), Walter Burkemo, Dow Finsterwald (8,11), Chick Harbert, Jay Hebert (11), Lionel Hebert (8), Bob Rosburg (9)

5. U.S. Amateur and Amateur champions (last 10 years)

Charles Coe (6,8,a), Richard Davies (6,a), Labron Harris Jr. (6,7,a)

- Deane Beman (6,9) and Harvie Ward did not play. Other champions forfeited their exemptions by turning professional.

6. Selections for the 1963 U.S. Walker Cup team

Robert W. Gardner (a), Downing Gray (7,a), Billy Joe Patton (7,a), R. H. Sikes (a), Charlie Smith (a), Ed Updegraff (a)

7. 1962 U.S. Amateur quarter-finalists

Homero Blancas (a), Charles Coody (a), Paul Desjardins (a), Jim Gabrielsen (a), Bill Newcomb (a)

8. Top 24 players and ties from the 1962 Masters Tournament

Julius Boros, Gay Brewer (9), Jacky Cupit, Gardner Dickinson, Paul Harney (10), Don January, Billy Maxwell (9), Johnny Pott, Mike Souchak (9,11), Ken Venturi

9. Top 16 players and ties from the 1962 U.S. Open

Bob Goalby (9), Tommy Jacobs, Bobby Nichols (10), Phil Rodgers, Doug Sanders

10. Top eight players and ties from 1962 PGA Championship

George Bayer, Dave Ragan

11. Members of the U.S. 1961 Ryder Cup team

Bill Collins

12. Two players selected for meritorious records on the fall part of the 1962 PGA Tour

Tony Lema, Jerry Pittman

13. One player, either amateur or professional, not already qualified, selected by a ballot of ex-Masters champions

Bo Wininger

14. One professional, not already qualified, selected by a ballot of ex-U.S. Open champions

Wes Ellis

15. One amateur, not already qualified, selected by a ballot of ex-U.S. Amateur champions

Bill Hyndman (a)

16. Two players, not already qualified, from a points list based on finishes in the winter part of the 1963 PGA Tour

Mason Rudolph, Dan Sikes

17. Foreign invitations

Al Balding (8), David Blair (a), Antonio Cerdá, Bob Charles, Chen Ching-Po, Bruce Crampton, Gerard de Wit, Juan Antonio Estrada (a), Jorge Ledesma (a), Stan Leonard, Ángel Miguel, Kel Nagle, Koichi Ono, Chi-Chi Rodríguez, Miguel Sala, Alvie Thompson

- Numbers in brackets indicate categories that the player would have qualified under had they been American.

== Round summaries ==
=== First round ===
Thursday, April 4, 1963

| Place | Player | Score | To par |
|---|---|---|---|
| T1 | (United States) Mike Souchak | 69 | −3 |
| T1 | (United States) Bo Wininger | 69 | −3 |
| T3 | (United States) Ed Furgol | 70 | −2 |
| T3 | (United States) Jay Hebert | 70 | −2 |
| T3 | (United States) Sam Snead | 70 | −2 |
| T6 | (United States) George Bayer | 71 | −1 |
| T6 | (South Africa) Gary Player | 71 | −1 |
| T8 | (United States) Charles Coe (a) | 72 | E |
| T8 | (United States) Billy Maxwell | 72 | E |
| T10 | (United States) Downing Gray (a) | 73 | +1 |
| T10 | (United States) Don January | 73 | +1 |
| T10 | (United States) Dick Mayer | 73 | +1 |
| T10 | (United States) Doug Sanders | 73 | +1 |

=== Second round ===
Friday, April 5, 1963

| Place | Player | Score | To par |
|---|---|---|---|
| 1 | (United States) Mike Souchak | 69-70=139 | −5 |
| T2 | (United States) Jay Hebert | 70-70=140 | −4 |
| T2 | (United States) Jack Nicklaus | 74-66=140 | −4 |
| T4 | (United States) Ed Furgol | 70-71=141 | −3 |
| T4 | (United States) Bo Wininger | 69-72=141 | −3 |
| T6 | (United States) Tony Lema | 74-69=143 | −1 |
| T6 | (United States) Dick Mayer | 73-70=143 | −1 |
| T6 | (United States) Sam Snead | 70-73=143 | −1 |
| T9 | (United States) Julius Boros | 76-69=145 | +1 |
| T9 | (South Africa) Gary Player | 71-74=145 | +1 |

=== Third round ===
Saturday, April 6, 1963

| Place | Player | Score | To par |
|---|---|---|---|
| 1 | (United States) Jack Nicklaus | 74-66-74=214 | −2 |
| 2 | (United States) Ed Furgol | 70-71-74=215 | −1 |
| 3 | (United States) Julius Boros | 76-69-71=216 | E |
| T4 | (United States) Tony Lema | 74-69-74=217 | +1 |
| T4 | (United States) Sam Snead | 70-73-74=217 | +1 |
| T6 | (Taiwan) Chen Ching-Po | 76-71-71=218 | +2 |
| T6 | (United States) Mike Souchak | 69-70-79=218 | +2 |
| T6 | (United States) Bo Wininger | 69-72-77=218 | +2 |
| T9 | (Canada) Stan Leonard | 74-72-73=219 | +3 |
| T9 | (South Africa) Gary Player | 71-74-74=219 | +3 |
| T9 | (United States) Mason Rudolph | 75-72-72=219 | +3 |

=== Final round ===
Sunday, April 7, 1963

==== Final leaderboard ====
Champion
Silver Cup winner (low amateur)
(a) = amateur
(c) = past champion

Top 10
| Place | Player | Score | To par | Money (US$) |
|---|---|---|---|---|
| 1 | (United States) Jack Nicklaus | 74-66-74-72=286 | −2 | 20,000 |
| 2 | (United States) Tony Lema | 74-69-74-70=287 | −1 | 12,000 |
| T3 | (United States) Julius Boros | 76-69-71-72=288 | E | 7,000 |
| T3 | (United States) Sam Snead (c) | 70-73-74-71=288 | E | 7,000 |
| T5 | (United States) Dow Finsterwald | 74-73-73-69=289 | +1 | 4,000 |
| T5 | (United States) Ed Furgol | 70-71-74-74=289 | +1 | 4,000 |
| T5 | (South Africa) Gary Player (c) | 71-74-74-70=289 | +1 | 4,000 |
| 8 | (United States) Bo Wininger | 69-72-77-72=290 | +2 | 2,400 |
| T9 | (United States) Don January | 73-75-72-71=291 | +3 | 1,800 |
| T9 | (United States) Arnold Palmer (c) | 74-73-73-71=291 | +3 | 1,800 |

Leaderboard below the top 10
| Place | Player | Score | To par | Money ($) |
|---|---|---|---|---|
| T11 | (United States) Billy Casper | 79-72-71-70=292 | +4 | 1,350 |
| T11 | (Australia) Bruce Crampton | 74-74-72-72=292 | +4 | 1,350 |
| T11 | (United States) Doug Ford (c) | 75-73-75-69=292 | +4 | 1,350 |
| T11 | (United States) Mike Souchak | 69-70-79-74=292 | +4 | 1,350 |
| T15 | (New Zealand) Bob Charles | 74-72-76-71=293 | +5 | 1,100 |
| T15 | (Chinese Taipei) Chen Ching-Po | 76-71-71-75=293 | +5 | 1,100 |
| T15 | (United States) Billy Maxwell | 72-75-76-70=293 | +5 | 1,100 |
| T15 | (United States) Dick Mayer | 73-70-80-70=293 | +5 | 1,100 |
| T15 | (United States) Mason Rudolph | 75-72-72-74=293 | +5 | 1,100 |
| T15 | (United States) Dan Sikes | 74-76-72-71=293 | +5 | 1,100 |
| T21 | (Canada) Stan Leonard | 74-72-73-75=294 | +6 | 1,000 |
| T21 | (United States) Johnny Pott | 75-76-74-69=294 | +6 | 1,000 |
| T21 | (United States) Art Wall Jr. (c) | 75-74-73-72=294 | +6 | 1,000 |
| T24 | (United States) Wes Ellis | 74-72-79-70=295 | +7 | 1,000 |
| T24 | (United States) Gene Littler | 77-72-78-68=295 | +7 | 1,000 |
| T24 | (United States) Bobby Nichols | 76-74-73-72=295 | +7 | 1,000 |
| 27 | (United States) Jay Hebert | 70-70-81-75=296 | +8 | 750 |
| T28 | (United States) George Bayer | 71-75-84-67=297 | +9 | 750 |
| T28 | (United States) Tommy Jacobs | 78-74-73-72=297 | +9 | 750 |
| T28 | (United States) Doug Sanders | 73-74-77-73=297 | +9 | 750 |
| T28 | (Canada) Alvie Thompson | 79-72-75-71=297 | +9 | 750 |
| T32 | (United States) Labron Harris Jr. (a) | 79-71-73-75=298 | +10 | 0 |
| T32 | (United States) Dave Ragan | 74-75-76-73=298 | +10 | 750 |
| 34 | (United States) Ken Venturi | 77-74-77-71=299 | +11 | 750 |
| T35 | (United States) Bill Hyndman (a) | 74-72-80-74=300 | +12 | 0 |
| T35 | (Australia) Kel Nagle | 75-74-76-75=300 | +12 | 750 |
| T37 | (United States) Tommy Bolt | 75-76-76-74=301 | +13 | 750 |
| T37 | (United States) Charles Coe (a) | 72-75-79-75=301 | +13 | 0 |
| T39 | (United States) Homero Blancas (a) | 75-77-76-74=302 | +14 | 0 |
| T39 | (Argentina) Antonio Cerdá | 75-71-78-78=302 | +14 | 750 |
| T39 | (United States) Lionel Hebert | 75-74-77-76=302 | +14 | 750 |
| 42 | (United States) Jack Fleck | 74-77-77-75=303 | +15 | 750 |
| T43 | (United States) Walter Burkemo | 75-77-78-74=304 | +16 | 750 |
| T43 | (United States) Jimmy Demaret (c) | 75-75-81-73=304 | +16 | 750 |
| 45 | (United States) Herman Keiser (c) | 75-77-79-74=305 | +17 | 750 |
| T46 | (United States) Downing Gray (a) | 73-76-81-76=306 | +18 | 0 |
| T46 | (United States) R. H. Sikes (a) | 76-76-77-77=306 | +18 | 0 |
| 48 | (United States) Billy Joe Patton (a) | 80-72-74-81=307 | +19 | 0 |
| 49 | (United States) Gene Sarazen (c) | 74-73-81-80=308 | +20 | 750 |
| CUT | (United States) Jerry Barber | 80-73=153 | +9 | |
| CUT | (Japan) Koichi Ono | 82-71=153 | +9 | |
| CUT | (United States) Phil Rodgers | 77-76=153 | +9 | |
| CUT | (United States) Bob Rosburg | 77-76=153 | +9 | |
| CUT | (Colombia) Miguel Sala | 75-78=153 | +9 | |
| CUT | (Canada) Al Balding | 82-72=154 | +10 | |
| CUT | (United States) Gay Brewer | 82-72=154 | +10 | |
| CUT | (United States) Jack Burke Jr. (c) | 78-76=154 | +10 | |
| CUT | (United States) Gardner Dickinson | 78-76=154 | +10 | |
| CUT | (United States) Chick Harbert | 75-79=154 | +10 | |
| CUT | (United States) Jim Gabrielsen (a) | 80-75=155 | +11 | |
| CUT | (Argentina) Jorge Ledesma (a) | 76-79=155 | +11 | |
| CUT | (Puerto Rico) Chi-Chi Rodríguez | 80-75=155 | +11 | |
| CUT | (United States) Bob Goalby | 80-76=156 | +12 | |
| CUT | (United States) Byron Nelson (c) | 79-77=156 | +12 | |
| CUT | (United States) Charlie Smith (a) | 80-76=156 | +12 | |
| CUT | (Spain) Ángel Miguel | 78-79=157 | +13 | |
| CUT | (United States) Jerry Pittman | 78-79=157 | +13 | |
| CUT | (United States) Ed Updegraff (a) | 82-75=157 | +13 | |
| CUT | (United States) Paul Desjardins (a) | 77-81=158 | +14 | |
| CUT | (Mexico) Juan Antonio Estrada (a) | 81-77=158 | +14 | |
| CUT | (United States) Bill Newcomb (a) | 81-77=158 | +14 | |
| CUT | (United States) Bill Collins | 82-77=159 | +15 | |
| CUT | (United States) Robert W. Gardner (a) | 78-82=160 | +16 | |
| CUT | (Scotland) David Blair (a) | 83-79=162 | +18 | |
| CUT | (United States) Richard Davies (a) | 79-84=163 | +19 | |
| CUT | (Netherlands) Gerard de Wit | 87-76=163 | +19 | |
| CUT | (United States) Charles Coody (a) | 80-84=164 | +20 | |
| CUT | (United States) Cary Middlecoff (c) | 87-81=168 | +24 | |
| CUT | (United States) Horton Smith (c) | 91-86=177 | +33 | |
| WD | (United States) Paul Harney | 75-77-78=230 | +14 | |
| WD | (United States) Jacky Cupit | 82 | +10 | |
| WD | (United States) Claude Harmon (c) | 82 | +10 | |
| WD | (United States) Henry Picard (c) | | | |
| WD | (United States) Craig Wood (c) | | | |

==== Scorecard ====
| Hole | 1 | 2 | 3 | 4 | 5 | 6 | 7 | 8 | 9 | 10 | 11 | 12 | 13 | 14 | 15 | 16 | 17 | 18 |
|---|---|---|---|---|---|---|---|---|---|---|---|---|---|---|---|---|---|---|
| Par | 4 | 5 | 4 | 3 | 4 | 3 | 4 | 5 | 4 | 4 | 4 | 3 | 5 | 4 | 5 | 3 | 4 | 4 |
| (United States) Nicklaus | −2 | −2 | −2 | −2 | −2 | −2 | −2 | −1 | −1 | −1 | −1 | E | −1 | −1 | −1 | −2 | −2 | −2 |
| (United States) Lema | +2 | +1 | +1 | E | E | E | E | E | E | E | +1 | +1 | E | E | E | E | E | −1 |
| (United States) Boros | +1 | E | E | +1 | +1 | +2 | +1 | +1 | +1 | +1 | +1 | E | E | E | E | E | E | E |
| (United States) Snead | +1 | E | E | E | E | E | −1 | −1 | E | E | E | E | E | −1 | −2 | −1 | −1 | E |
| (United States) Finsterwald | +3 | +2 | +3 | +3 | +2 | +3 | +3 | +2 | +2 | +2 | +2 | +3 | +3 | +2 | +1 | +1 | +1 | +1 |
| (United States) Furgol | −1 | −1 | −1 | E | +1 | +1 | +1 | +1 | +1 | +2 | +3 | +3 | +3 | +3 | +2 | +2 | +1 | +1 |
| (South Africa) Player | +2 | +2 | +2 | +2 | +1 | +1 | +1 | +1 | +1 | +1 | +1 | +1 | E | E | −1 | −1 | E | +1 |

Cumulative tournament scores, relative to par

| Birdie | Bogey |
