= 1960 Masters Tournament =

- Front cover of the 1960 Masters Guide

Tournament information
- Dates: April 7–10, 1960
- Location: Augusta, Georgia; 33.503°N 82.020°W
- Course: Augusta National Golf Club
- Organized by: Augusta National Golf Club
- Tour: PGA Tour

Statistics
- Par: 72
- Length: 6,980 yards (6,383 m)
- Field: 83 players, 45 after cut
- Cut: 150 (+6)
- Prize fund: $87,050
- Winner's share: $17,500

Champion
- (United States) Arnold Palmer
- 282 (−6)

Location map
- Location in the United States Location in Georgia

The 1960 Masters Tournament was the 24th Masters Tournament, held April 7–10 at Augusta National Golf Club in Augusta, Georgia. Arnold Palmer birdied the final two holes to win by one stroke over runner-up Ken Venturi.

It was the second of Palmer's four Masters victories and the second of his seven major titles. Palmer, age 30, also won the U.S. Open in 1960 and was the runner-up at the British Open.

Jack Nicklaus, age 20 and the reigning U.S. Amateur champion, played in his second Masters. He made the cut for the first time at Augusta and tied for 13th place. Defending champion Art Wall Jr. did not play, due to a knee injury. The purse was $87,050 with a winner's share of $17,500.

Third place finisher Dow Finsterwald received a two-stroke penalty after the second round for violating a local rule, practice putting on the green following the conclusion of a hole, and lost the title by two strokes. The incident had occurred in the first round, and was self-reported after the second round after he was informed by his playing partner Billy Casper that it was not allowed. Instead of leading at 139 (−5), Finsterwald was tied with Ben Hogan and two others for second place after two rounds at 141, one stroke behind leader Palmer at 140.

Palmer was the sole leader after all four rounds and was the second wire-to-wire winner at the Masters, following Craig Wood in 1941. Subsequent wire-to-wire winners were Jack Nicklaus in 1972, Raymond Floyd in 1976, Jordan Spieth in 2015, and Rory McIlroy in 2026.

The 36-hole cut rule was slightly modified this year to include all golfers in the top 40 plus ties or within 10 strokes of the lead. Previously the cut rule at the Masters (instituted in 1957) was top 40 plus ties. Three golfers made the cut at 150 (+6) who would not have made the cut under the previous rule.

The par-3 contest was introduced this year, and three-time Masters champion Sam Snead won with a score of 23 (−4).

== Field ==
1. Masters champions

Jack Burke Jr. (4,11), Jimmy Demaret, Doug Ford (4,9,11), Claude Harmon (9), Ben Hogan (2,3,4,9), Herman Keiser, Cary Middlecoff (2,8,10,11), Byron Nelson (2,4), Arnold Palmer (8,9), Henry Picard (4), Gene Sarazen (2,3,4), Horton Smith, Sam Snead (3,4,8,9,10,11), Craig Wood (2)

- Ralph Guldahl (2) and Art Wall Jr. (8,11) did not play. Wall, the defending champion, had a knee injury.

The following categories only apply to Americans

2. U.S. Open champions

Tommy Bolt, Julius Boros (8,11), Billy Burke, Billy Casper (9), Chick Evans (5,a), Jack Fleck (8), Ed Furgol, Tony Manero, Lloyd Mangrum, Fred McLeod, Sam Parks Jr., Lew Worsham

- Dick Mayer (8) did not play.

3. The Open champions

Jock Hutchison (4), Denny Shute (4)

4. PGA champions

Walter Burkemo (8), Dow Finsterwald (8,9,10,11), Vic Ghezzi, Chick Harbert (8), Chandler Harper (8), Lionel Hebert, Johnny Revolta, Bob Rosburg (9,10,11), Paul Runyan, Jim Turnesa

5. U.S. Amateur and Amateur champions

Deane Beman (6,a), Dick Chapman (a), Charles Coe (6,7,8,a), Jack Nicklaus (6,7,a), Robert Sweeny Jr. (a)

6. Members of the 1959 U.S. Walker Cup team

Tommy Aaron (a), William C. Campbell (a), Chuck Kocsis (8,a), Billy Joe Patton (8,a), Bud Taylor (a), Ward Wettlaufer (a)

- Campbell and Kocsis were reserves for the team. Bill Hyndman (7,8) and Harvie Ward did not play.

7. 1959 U.S. Amateur quarter-finalists

Gene Andrews (a), David Goldman (a), Charles Harrison (a), Dudley Wysong (a)

- Dick Yost did not play.

8. Top 24 players and ties from the 1959 Masters Tournament

Fred Hawkins (9), Jay Hebert (11), Ted Kroll (9), Gene Littler (9), Billy Maxwell, Ed Oliver, Bo Wininger

9. Top 16 players and ties from the 1959 U.S. Open

Dick Knight, Dave Marr, Mike Souchak (10,11), Ernie Vossler

10. Top eight players and ties from 1959 PGA Championship

Jerry Barber, Bob Goalby, Doug Sanders, Ken Venturi

11. Members of the U.S. 1959 Ryder Cup team

12. One player, either amateur or professional, not already qualified, selected by a ballot of ex-Masters champions

Mason Rudolph

13. One professional, not already qualified, selected by a ballot of ex-U.S. Open champions

George Bayer

14. One amateur, not already qualified, selected by a ballot of ex-U.S. Amateur champions

Richard Crawford (a)

15. Two players, not already qualified, from a points list based on finishes in the winter part of the 1960 PGA Tour

Don January, Dave Ragan

16. Foreign invitations

Bruce Crampton, Mário Gonzalez, Harold Henning, Denis Hutchinson, Stan Leonard (8), Ángel Miguel, Kel Nagle, Gary Player (3,8,9), Norman Von Nida, Harry Weetman

- Numbers in brackets indicate categories that the player would have qualified under had they been American.

== Round summaries ==
=== First round ===
Thursday, April 7, 1960

| Place | Player | Score | To par |
|---|---|---|---|
| 1 | (United States) Arnold Palmer | 67 | −5 |
| T2 | (United States) Fred Hawkins | 69 | −3 |
| T2 | (United States) Claude Harmon | 69 | −3 |
| T2 | (United States) Jay Hebert | 69 | −3 |
| T5 | (United States) Don January | 70 | −2 |
| T5 | (United States) Bud Taylor (a) | 70 | −2 |
| T5 | (England) Harry Weetman | 70 | −2 |
| T8 | (United States) Deane Beman (a) | 71 | −1 |
| T8 | (United States) Billy Casper | 71 | −1 |
| T8 | (United States) Dow Finsterwald | 71 | −1 |
| T8 | (United States) Gene Littler | 71 | −1 |

- Finsterwald carded a 69, but incurred a two-stroke penalty for violating a local rule.

=== Second round ===
Friday, April 8, 1960

| Place | Player | Score | To par |
|---|---|---|---|
| 1 | (United States) Arnold Palmer | 67-73=140 | −4 |
| T2 | (United States) Walter Burkemo | 72-69=141 | −3 |
| T2 | (United States) Dow Finsterwald | 71-70=141 | −3 |
| T2 | (United States) Claude Harmon | 69-72=141 | −3 |
| T2 | (United States) Ben Hogan | 73-68=141 | −3 |
| T6 | (United States) Billy Casper | 71-71=142 | −2 |
| T6 | (United States) Don January | 70-72=142 | −2 |
| T6 | (United States) Ken Venturi | 73-69=142 | −2 |
| T9 | (United States) Deane Beman (a) | 71-72=143 | −1 |
| T9 | (United States) Julius Boros | 72-71=143 | −1 |
| T9 | (United States) Billy Maxwell | 72-71=143 | −1 |
| T9 | (South Africa) Gary Player | 72-71=143 | −1 |

=== Third round ===
Saturday, April 9, 1960

| Place | Player | Score | To par |
|---|---|---|---|
| 1 | (United States) Arnold Palmer | 67-73-72=212 | −4 |
| T2 | (United States) Julius Boros | 72-71-70=213 | −3 |
| T2 | (United States) Billy Casper | 71-71-71=213 | −3 |
| T2 | (United States) Dow Finsterwald | 71-70-72=213 | −3 |
| T2 | (United States) Ben Hogan | 73-68-72=213 | −3 |
| T2 | (United States) Ken Venturi | 73-69-71=213 | −3 |
| 7 | (South Africa) Gary Player | 72-71-72=215 | −1 |
| T8 | (United States) Walter Burkemo | 72-69-75=216 | E |
| T8 | (United States) Claude Harmon | 69-72-75=216 | E |
| T8 | (United States) Don January | 70-72-74=216 | E |
| T8 | (Canada) Stan Leonard | 72-72-72=216 | E |

=== Final round ===
Sunday, April 10, 1960

==== Final leaderboard ====
Champion
Silver Cup winner (low amateur)
(a) = amateur
(c) = past champion

Top 10
| Place | Player | Score | To par | Money (US$) |
|---|---|---|---|---|
| 1 | (United States) Arnold Palmer (c) | 67-73-72-70=282 | −6 | 17,500 |
| 2 | (United States) Ken Venturi | 73-69-71-70=283 | −5 | 10,500 |
| 3 | (United States) Dow Finsterwald | 71-70-72-71=284 | −4 | 7,000 |
| 4 | (United States) Billy Casper | 71-71-71-74=287 | −1 | 5,250 |
| 5 | (United States) Julius Boros | 72-71-70-75=288 | E | 4,200 |
| T6 | (United States) Walter Burkemo | 72-69-75-73=289 | +1 | 2,800 |
| T6 | (United States) Ben Hogan (c) | 73-68-72-76=289 | +1 | 2,800 |
| T6 | (South Africa) Gary Player | 72-71-72-74=289 | +1 | 2,800 |
| T9 | (United States) Lionel Hebert | 74-70-73-73=290 | +2 | 1,575 |
| T9 | (Canada) Stan Leonard | 72-72-72-74=290 | +2 | 1,575 |

Leaderboard below the top 10
| Place | Player | Score | To par | Money ($) |
|---|---|---|---|---|
| T11 | (United States) Jack Burke Jr. (c) | 72-72-74-74=292 | +4 | 1,225 |
| T11 | (United States) Sam Snead (c) | 73-74-72-73=292 | +4 | 1,225 |
| T13 | (United States) Ted Kroll | 72-76-71-74=293 | +5 | 1,225 |
| T13 | (United States) Jack Nicklaus (a) | 75-71-72-75=293 | +5 | 0 |
| T13 | (United States) Billy Joe Patton (a) | 75-72-74-72=293 | +5 | 0 |
| T16 | (Australia) Bruce Crampton | 74-73-75-72=294 | +6 | 1,050 |
| T16 | (United States) Claude Harmon (c) | 69-72-75-78=294 | +6 | 1,050 |
| T16 | (United States) Fred Hawkins | 69-78-72-75=294 | +6 | 1,050 |
| T16 | (United States) Mike Souchak | 72-75-72-75=294 | +6 | 1,050 |
| T20 | (United States) Tommy Bolt | 73-74-75-73=295 | +7 | 875 |
| T20 | (United States) Don January | 70-72-74-79=295 | +7 | 875 |
| T20 | (United States) Ed Oliver | 74-75-73-73=295 | +7 | 875 |
| T20 | (United States) Bob Rosburg | 74-74-71-76=295 | +7 | 875 |
| T20 | (United States) Bud Taylor (a) | 70-74-73-78=295 | +7 | 0 |
| T25 | (United States) Tommy Aaron (a) | 74-75-75-73=297 | +9 | 0 |
| T25 | (United States) Doug Ford (c) | 74-72-80-71=297 | +9 | 875 |
| T25 | (United States) Billy Maxwell | 72-71-79-75=297 | +9 | 875 |
| T25 | (United States) Dave Ragan | 74-73-75-75=297 | +9 | 875 |
| T29 | (United States) George Bayer | 73-73-80-72=298 | +10 | 500 |
| T29 | (United States) Deane Beman (a) | 71-72-77-78=298 | +10 | 0 |
| T29 | (United States) Richard Crawford (a) | 74-72-75-77=298 | +10 | 0 |
| T29 | (United States) Doug Sanders | 73-71-81-73=298 | +10 | 500 |
| 33 | (United States) Gene Andrews (a) | 73-76-77-73=299 | +11 | 0 |
| T34 | (United States) Jerry Barber | 76-73-74-77=300 | +12 | 500 |
| T34 | (United States) Jack Fleck | 78-71-77-74=300 | +12 | 500 |
| T34 | (United States) Chuck Kocsis (a) | 76-72-78-74=300 | +12 | 0 |
| T34 | (United States) Dave Marr | 73-77-77-73=300 | +12 | 500 |
| T34 | (England) Harry Weetman | 70-78-74-78=300 | +12 | 500 |
| T39 | (United States) Charles Coe (a) | 72-74-78-77=301 | +13 | 0 |
| T39 | (United States) Chick Harbert | 73-77-74-77=301 | +13 | 500 |
| T39 | (United States) Jay Hebert | 69-77-78-77=301 | +13 | 500 |
| T39 | (United States) Jim Turnesa | 76-73-73-79=301 | +13 | 500 |
| 43 | (United States) Lloyd Mangrum | 74-74-76-78=302 | +14 | 500 |
| 44 | (United States) Lew Worsham | 72-76-74-84=306 | +18 | 500 |
| 45 | (United States) Ward Wettlaufer (a) | 73-77-83-78=311 | +23 | 0 |
| CUT | (United States) Jimmy Demaret (c) | 75-76=151 | +7 | |
| CUT | (United States) Bob Goalby | 76-75=151 | +7 | |
| CUT | (South Africa) Harold Henning | 77-74=151 | +7 | |
| CUT | (United States) Dick Knight | 75-76=151 | +7 | |
| CUT | (United States) Cary Middlecoff (c) | 75-76=151 | +7 | |
| CUT | (Spain) Ángel Miguel | 78-73=151 | +7 | |
| CUT | (United States) Mason Rudolph | 78-73=151 | +7 | |
| CUT | (United States) Paul Runyan | 73-78=151 | +7 | |
| CUT | (Australia) Kel Nagle | 77-75=152 | +8 | |
| CUT | (United States) Byron Nelson (c) | 76-76=152 | +8 | |
| CUT | (Australia) Norman Von Nida | 79-73=152 | +8 | |
| CUT | (United States) William C. Campbell (a) | 76-77=153 | +9 | |
| CUT | (United States) Ed Furgol | 76-77=153 | +9 | |
| CUT | (United States) Vic Ghezzi | 73-80=153 | +9 | |
| CUT | (Brazil) Mário Gonzalez | 78-75=153 | +9 | |
| CUT | (United States) Charles Harrison (a) | 74-79=153 | +9 | |
| CUT | (United States) Gene Littler | 71-82=153 | +9 | |
| CUT | (United States) Henry Picard (c) | 76-77=153 | +9 | |
| CUT | (United States) Horton Smith (c) | 76-77=153 | +9 | |
| CUT | (United States) David Goldman (a) | 77-77=154 | +10 | |
| CUT | (United States) Chandler Harper | 76-78=154 | +10 | |
| CUT | (United States) Robert Sweeny Jr. (a) | 81-73=154 | +10 | |
| CUT | (United States) Bo Wininger | 79-75=154 | +10 | |
| CUT | (United States) Denny Shute | 78-77=155 | +11 | |
| CUT | (United States) Billy Burke | 73-83=156 | +12 | |
| CUT | (South Africa) Denis Hutchinson | 81-75=156 | +12 | |
| CUT | (United States) Herman Keiser (c) | 78-78=156 | +12 | |
| CUT | (United States) Gene Sarazen (c) | 76-80=156 | +12 | |
| CUT | (United States) Dudley Wysong (a) | 79-77=156 | +12 | |
| CUT | (United States) Tony Manero | 78-79=157 | +13 | |
| CUT | (United States) Ernie Vossler | 78-80=158 | +14 | |
| CUT | (United States) Sam Parks Jr. | 78-81=159 | +15 | |
| CUT | (United States) Johnny Revolta | 81-81=162 | +18 | |
| CUT | (United States) Chick Evans (a) | 91-89=180 | +36 | |
| WD | (United States) Craig Wood (c) | 80 | +8 | |
| WD | (United States) Jock Hutchison | | | |
| WD | (United States) Fred McLeod | | | |
| DQ | (United States) Dick Chapman (a) | 79 | +7 | |

==== Scorecard ====
| Hole | 1 | 2 | 3 | 4 | 5 | 6 | 7 | 8 | 9 | 10 | 11 | 12 | 13 | 14 | 15 | 16 | 17 | 18 |
|---|---|---|---|---|---|---|---|---|---|---|---|---|---|---|---|---|---|---|
| Par | 4 | 5 | 4 | 3 | 4 | 3 | 4 | 5 | 4 | 4 | 4 | 3 | 5 | 4 | 5 | 3 | 4 | 4 |
| (United States) Palmer | −5 | −5 | −4 | −4 | −3 | −3 | −3 | −4 | −4 | −4 | −4 | −4 | −4 | −4 | −4 | −4 | −5 | −6 |
| (United States) Venturi | −3 | −4 | −5 | −5 | −5 | −6 | −6 | −6 | −6 | −6 | −5 | −5 | −5 | −5 | −5 | −5 | −5 | −5 |
| (United States) Finsterwald | −3 | −3 | −3 | −3 | −3 | −3 | −3 | −4 | −5 | −5 | −5 | −4 | −4 | −5 | −5 | −5 | −5 | −4 |
| (United States) Casper | −3 | −3 | −3 | −3 | −2 | −2 | −2 | −2 | −2 | −2 | −2 | −1 | −2 | −1 | −2 | −1 | −1 | −1 |
| (United States) Boros | −3 | −3 | −1 | −1 | −1 | −1 | −2 | −1 | −1 | −1 | −2 | −2 | −2 | −1 | −2 | −2 | −1 | E |
| (United States) Burkemo | E | +1 | +1 | +1 | +1 | +1 | +2 | +2 | +2 | +1 | +1 | +1 | +1 | +2 | +1 | +1 | +1 | +1 |
| (United States) Hogan | −2 | −3 | −2 | −2 | −2 | −1 | −1 | −1 | −1 | −1 | −1 | −1 | −1 | E | E | +1 | +1 | +1 |
| (South Africa) Player | −1 | −1 | E | E | E | E | E | +1 | +2 | +2 | +2 | +2 | +1 | +1 | +1 | E | +1 | +1 |
| (United States) Hebert | +1 | +1 | +1 | +1 | +1 | +1 | +1 | +2 | +1 | +1 | +2 | +2 | +1 | +1 | E | +1 | +1 | +2 |
| (Canada) Leonard | +1 | +1 | +2 | +3 | +4 | +4 | +3 | +3 | +3 | +3 | +3 | +4 | +3 | +3 | +2 | +2 | +2 | +2 |

Cumulative tournament scores, relative to par

| Birdie | Bogey | Double bogey |
