= 1967 Masters Tournament =

- Front cover of the 1967 Masters Guide

Tournament information
- Dates: April 6–9, 1967
- Location: Augusta, Georgia; 33.503°N 82.020°W
- Course: Augusta National Golf Club
- Organized by: Augusta National Golf Club
- Tour: PGA Tour

Statistics
- Par: 72
- Length: 6,980 yards (6,383 m)
- Field: 83 players, 55 after cut
- Cut: 150 (+6)
- Prize fund: $163,350
- Winner's share: $20,000

Champion
- (United States) Gay Brewer
- 280 (−8)
- Location in the United States Location in Georgia

The 1967 Masters Tournament was the 31st Masters Tournament, held April 6–9 at Augusta National Golf Club. Gay Brewer won his only major title by one stroke over runner-up Bobby Nichols.

Rebounding from a three-putt on the 72nd hole and a playoff loss the previous year, Brewer birdied the 13th, 14th, and 15th holes on Sunday. Arnold Palmer finished in fourth and Gary Player finished tied for 6th, while Sam Snead and Ben Hogan, both age 54, finished tied for 10th. In the third round, Hogan shot a 66 which was the lowest single round score in the tournament, while he struggled with an aching shoulder and legs. Hogan's round included a course record-tying 30 on the back nine, with birdies at 10, 11, 12, 13, 15, and 18, with pars at the other three holes. It was later equaled by Player in 1978 and Jack Nicklaus in 1986; both shot 30 on the back nine on Sunday to win by a stroke. The record stood until Mark Calcavecchia shot 29 on the back nine in 1992 (David Toms also shot a 29 on the back nine in 1998). This was Hogan's final appearance in the Masters; his last major was two months later at the U.S. Open. For Snead, a three-time champion, it marked his final top ten finish at Augusta; he participated into the 1980s.

It was also the last Masters for three-time champion Jimmy Demaret as a participant, who missed the cut by four strokes. He won the Masters in 1940, 1947, and 1950, but had not played in the other three majors since 1958.

Two-time defending champion Nicklaus shot a nine-bogey 79 in the second round and missed the cut by one stroke, the first defending champion not to play on the weekend. (The 36-hole cut at Augusta was introduced a decade earlier, in 1957.) It was his only missed cut at the Masters from 1960 through 1993 (withdrew before 2nd round in 1983); he missed the cut by a stroke in his first appearance in 1959 at age 19. Nicklaus regrouped and won the next major, the U.S. Open at Baltusrol. With the missed cut, Nicklaus failed to qualify for the Ryder Cup team, the first for which he was eligible. He had been in a minor slump and only became eligible in mid-1966, more than halfway through the two-year qualifying cycle, His win in the previous Masters did not count for the Ryder Cup as it was prior to his full PGA of America membership and it was the era prior to captains' picks.

Arnold Palmer won the eighth Par 3 contest with a score of 23. Like Hogan and Snead, this was his last top 10 in the Masters.

== Course ==
Hole	Name	Yards	Par	Hole	Name	Yards	Par
1	White Pine	400	4	10	Camellia	470	4
2	Woodbine	555	5	11	Dogwood	445	4
3	Flowering Peach	355	4	12	Golden Bell	155	3
4	Palm	220	3	13	Azalea	475	5
5	Magnolia	450	4	14	Chinese Fir	420	4
6	Juniper	190	3	15	Firethorn	520	5
7	Pampas	365	4	16	Redbud	190	3
8	Yellow Jasmine	530	5	17	Nandina	400	4
9	Carolina Cherry	420	4	18	Holly	420	4
Out		3,485	36	In		3,495	36
Source:				Total		6,980	72

^ Holes 1, 2, 4, and 11 were later renamed.

== Field ==
1. Masters champions

Jack Burke Jr., Jimmy Demaret, Doug Ford (8), Ralph Guldahl, Claude Harmon, Ben Hogan (8,9), Herman Keiser, Cary Middlecoff, Jack Nicklaus (2,3,4,8,9), Arnold Palmer (2,3,8,9,10,11), Henry Picard, Gary Player (2,3,4,9,10), Gene Sarazen, Sam Snead (10), Art Wall Jr.

- Byron Nelson and Craig Wood did not play.

The following categories only apply to Americans

2. U.S. Open champions (last 10 years)

Tommy Bolt (8), Julius Boros (10,11), Billy Casper (8,9,10,11), Gene Littler (10,11), Dick Mayer, Ken Venturi (8,11)

3. The Open champions (last 10 years)

4. PGA champions (last 10 years)

Jerry Barber, Dow Finsterwald, Al Geiberger (10), Jay Hebert (8), Lionel Hebert, Dave Marr (9,10), Bobby Nichols (8,9), Bob Rosburg (8)

5. The first eight finishers in the 1966 U.S. Amateur

Don Allen (a), Deane Beman (7,a), Ron Cerrudo (7,a), Jimmy Grant (a), Downing Gray (7,a), Jack Lewis Jr. (a), Dick Siderowf (a)

- Grant and Mike Morley tied for 8th place but Grace won the place by the drawing of lots. Morley was later invited under a different category.

6. Previous two U.S. Amateur and Amateur champion

Bob Murphy (7,9,a)

7. Members of the 1966 U.S. Eisenhower Trophy team

8. Top 24 players and ties from the 1966 Masters Tournament

Tommy Aaron, Frank Beard, Gay Brewer, Terry Dill, Raymond Floyd, Paul Harney, Tommy Jacobs (11), Don January (11), Phil Rodgers (9), Doug Sanders (9,10)

9. Top 16 players and ties from the 1966 U.S. Open

Wes Ellis, Rod Funseth, Rives McBee, Johnny Miller (a), Mason Rudolph

10. Top eight players and ties from 1966 PGA Championship

Jacky Cupit, Dudley Wysong

11. Members of the U.S. 1965 Ryder Cup team

Johnny Pott

12. Two players selected for meritorious records on the fall part of the 1966 PGA Tour

Bob Goalby, Bert Yancey

13. One player, either amateur or professional, not already qualified, selected by a ballot of ex-Masters champions.

Gardner Dickinson

14. One professional, not already qualified, selected by a ballot of ex-U.S. Open champions.

Don Massengale

15. One amateur, not already qualified, selected by a ballot of ex-U.S. Amateur champions.

Mike Morley (a)

16. Two players, not already qualified, from a points list based on finishes in the winter part of the PGA Tour

George Archer, Ken Still

17. Foreign invitations

Peter Alliss, Peter Butler (8), Joe Carr (a), Bob Charles (3), Chen Ching-Po (8), Bobby Cole (6,a), Gary Cowan (5,6,a), Bruce Crampton (8), Roberto De Vicenzo (8), Bruce Devlin, Harold Henning (8), Tony Jacklin, George Knudson (8), Kel Nagle (3), Chi-Chi Rodríguez, Luis Silverio (a), Ramón Sota, Bob Stanton, Hideyo Sugimoto, Dave Thomas, Bobby Verwey

== Round summaries ==
=== First round ===
Thursday, April 6, 1967

Place	Player	Score	To par
1	(United States) Bert Yancey	67	−5
T2	(United States) Billy Casper	70	−2
T2	(United States) Downing Gray (a)	70	−2
T4	(United States) Julius Boros	71	−1
T4	(England) Tony Jacklin	71	−1
T6	(United States) Tommy Bolt	72	E
T6	(England) Peter Butler	72	E
T6	(United States) Jay Hebert	72	E
T6	(Canada) George Knudson	72	E
T6	(United States) Gene Littler	72	E
T6	(United States) Johnny Miller (a)	72	E
T6	(United States) Bobby Nichols	72	E
T6	(United States) Jack Nicklaus	72	E
T6	(United States) Phil Rodgers	72	E
T6	(United States) Mason Rudolph	72	E
T6	(United States) Sam Snead	72	E

=== Second round ===
Friday, April 7, 1967

Place	Player	Score	To par
1	(United States) Bert Yancey	67-73=140	−4
T2	(United States) Julius Boros	71-70=141	−3
T2	(United States) Gay Brewer	73-68=141	−3
T2	(England) Tony Jacklin	71-70=141	−3
T2	(United States) Bobby Nichols	72-69=141	−3
6	(United States) George Archer	75-67=142	−2
T7	(United States) Tommy Aaron	75-68=143	−1
T7	(United States) Doug Ford	74-69=143	−1
T9	(United States) Billy Casper	70-64=144	E
T9	(Australia) Bruce Devlin	74-70=144	E
T9	(United States) Paul Harney	73-71=144	E
T9	(South Africa) Gary Player	75-69=144	E

=== Third round ===
Saturday, April 8, 1967

Place	Player	Score	To par
T1	(United States) Julius Boros	71-70-70=211	−5
T1	(United States) Bobby Nichols	72-69-70=211	−5
T1	(United States) Bert Yancey	67-73-71=211	−5
T4	(United States) Gay Brewer	73-68-72=213	−3
T4	(United States) Ben Hogan	74-73-66=213	−3
6	(United States) George Archer	75-67-72=214	−2
T7	(England) Tony Jacklin	71-70-74=215	−1
T7	(United States) Lionel Hebert	77-71-67=215	−1
T9	(United States) Jacky Cupit	73-76-67=216	E
T9	(United States) Arnold Palmer	73-73-70=216	E
T9	(South Africa) Gary Player	75-69-72=216	E

=== Final round ===
Sunday, April 9, 1967

==== Final leaderboard ====
Champion
Silver Cup winner (low amateur)
(a) = amateur
(c) = past champion

Top 10
Place	Player	Score	To par	Money (US$)
1	(United States) Gay Brewer	73-68-72-67=280	−8	20,000
2	(United States) Bobby Nichols	72-69-70-70=281	−7	14,000
3	(United States) Bert Yancey	67-73-71-73=284	−4	9,000
4	(United States) Arnold Palmer (c)	73-73-70-69=285	−3	6,600
5	(United States) Julius Boros	71-70-70-75=286	−2	5,500
T6	(United States) Paul Harney	73-71-74-69=287	−1	4,150
T6	(South Africa) Gary Player (c)	75-69-72-71=287	−1	4,150
T8	(United States) Tommy Aaron	75-68-74-71=288	E	3,350
T8	(United States) Lionel Hebert	77-71-67-73=288	E	3,350
T10	(Argentina) Roberto De Vicenzo	73-72-74-71=290	+2	2,720
T10	(Australia) Bruce Devlin	74-70-75-71=290	+2	2,720
T10	(United States) Ben Hogan (c)	74-73-66-77=290	+2	2,720
T10	(United States) Mason Rudolph	72-76-72-70=290	+2	2,720
T10	(United States) Sam Snead (c)	72-76-71-71=290	+2	2,720

Leaderboard below the top 10
Place	Player	Score	To par	Money ($)
15	(United States) Jacky Cupit	73-76-67-75=291	+3	2,400
T16	(United States) George Archer	75-67-72-78=292	+4	2,100
T16	(United States) Wes Ellis	79-71-74-68=292	+4	2,100
T16	(England) Tony Jacklin	71-70-74-77=292	+4	2,100
T16	(United States) Dave Marr	73-74-70-75=292	+4	2,100
T16	(United States) Doug Sanders	74-72-73-73=292	+4	2,100
T21	(United States) Jay Hebert	72-77-68-76=293	+5	1,700
T21	(United States) Bob Rosburg	73-72-76-72=293	+5	1,700
T21	(United States) Ken Venturi	76-73-71-73=293	+5	1,700
T24	(England) Peter Butler	72-73-77-72=294	+6	1,500
T24	(United States) Billy Casper	70-74-75-75=294	+6	1,500
T26	(United States) Frank Beard	74-75-75-71=295	+7	1,300
T26	(United States) Tommy Bolt	72-77-72-74=295	+7	1,300
T26	(United States) Don January	74-74-76-71=295	+7	1,300
T26	(United States) Gene Littler	72-74-74-75=295	+7	1,300
T26	(Puerto Rico) Chi-Chi Rodríguez	73-73-73-76=295	+7	1,300
T31	(United States) Doug Ford (c)	74-69-82-71=296	+8	1,300
T31	(United States) Rod Funseth	74-73-78-71=296	+8	1,300
T31	(Canada) George Knudson	72-74-75-75=296	+8	1,300
T31	(Australia) Kel Nagle	73-75-74-74=296	+8	1,300
T31	(Spain) Ramón Sota	74-73-73-76=296	+8	1,300
T36	(United States) Gardner Dickinson	77-70-73-77=297	+9	1,275
T36	(United States) Terry Dill	73-76-72-76=297	+9	1,275
T36	(United States) Al Geiberger	77-73-72-75=297	+9	1,275
T36	(United States) Downing Gray (a)	70-76-75-76=297	+9	0
T36	(South Africa) Harold Henning	74-73-77-73=297	+9	1,275
T36	(United States) Phil Rodgers	72-77-75-73=297	+9	1,275
T42	(United States) Deane Beman (a)	74-76-74-74=298	+10	0
T42	(United States) Rives McBee	75-73-74-76=298	+10	1,275
T44	(United States) Don Allen (a)	75-71-78-76=300	+12	0
T44	(South Africa) Bobby Cole (a)	75-73-74-78=300	+12	0
T46	(United States) Ron Cerrudo (a)	76-73-77-75=301	+13	0
T46	(Chinese Taipei) Chen Ching-Po	74-76-72-79=301	+13	1,250
T46	(Wales) Dave Thomas	74-74-72-81=301	+13	1,250
T49	(Australia) Bruce Crampton	77-73-75-77=302	+14	1,250
T49	(United States) Don Massengale	74-73-77-78=302	+14	1,250
T49	(United States) Art Wall Jr. (c)	74-76-77-75=302	+14	1,250
52	(United States) Bob Murphy (a)	73-77-76-77=303	+15	0
T53	(United States) Jack Burke Jr. (c)	76-74-74-81=305	+17	1,250
T53	(United States) Johnny Miller (a)	72-78-81-74=305	+17	0
55	(Republic of Ireland) Joe Carr (a)	76-74-79-84=313	+25	0
CUT	(United States) Jerry Barber	77-74=151	+7	
CUT	(Canada) Gary Cowan (a)	77-74=151	+7	
CUT	(United States) Raymond Floyd	74-77=151	+7	
CUT	(United States) Jack Nicklaus (c)	72-79=151	+7	
CUT	(United States) Dudley Wysong	76-75=151	+7	
CUT	(United States) Jimmy Grant (a)	76-76=152	+8	
CUT	(United States) Johnny Pott	78-74=152	+8	
CUT	(Philippines) Luis Silverio (a)	76-76=152	+8	
CUT	(United States) Ken Still	76-76=152	+8	
CUT	(Japan) Hideyo Sugimoto	76-76=152	+8	
CUT	(South Africa) Bobby Verwey	79-73=152	+8	
CUT	(United States) Jimmy Demaret (c)	81-73=154	+10	
CUT	(United States) Mike Morley (a)	74-80=154	+10	
CUT	(United States) Henry Picard (c)	78-76=154	+10	
CUT	(New Zealand) Bob Charles	76-79=155	+11	
CUT	(United States) Ralph Guldahl (c)	80-75=155	+11	
CUT	(United States) Herman Keiser (c)	78-77=155	+11	
CUT	(United States) Bob Goalby	78-78=156	+12	
CUT	(England) Peter Alliss	80-77=157	+13	
CUT	(United States) Dow Finsterwald	80-78=158	+14	
CUT	(Australia) Bob Stanton	78-80=158	+14	
CUT	(United States) Tommy Jacobs	80-79=159	+15	
CUT	(United States) Dick Siderowf (a)	78-81=159	+15	
CUT	(United States) Cary Middlecoff (c)	84-76=160	+16	
CUT	(United States) Jack Lewis Jr. (a)	81-81=162	+18	
WD	(United States) Gene Sarazen (c)	84	+12	
WD	(United States) Claude Harmon (c)			
DQ	(United States) Dick Mayer	79	+7	

==== Scorecard ====
Hole	1	2	3	4	5	6	7	8	9	10	11	12	13	14	15	16	17	18
Par	4	5	4	3	4	3	4	5	4	4	4	3	5	4	5	3	4	4
(United States) Brewer	−3	−4	−4	−4	−4	−4	−5	−6	−6	−5	−5	−5	−6	−7	−8	−8	−8	−8
(United States) Nichols	−6	−6	−6	−6	−6	−6	−6	−7	−7	−6	−5	−5	−5	−6	−7	−7	−7	−7
(United States) Yancey	−5	−5	−5	−5	−5	−5	−5	−6	−6	−5	−5	−5	−5	−5	−6	−5	−4	−4
(United States) Palmer	E	E	−1	−1	−1	−1	E	E	E	E	−1	−1	−2	−2	−3	−3	−3	−3
(United States) Boros	−5	−5	−5	−5	−5	−6	−6	−5	−4	−5	−4	−2	−3	−3	−3	−3	−3	−2
(United States) Hogan	−2	−1	E	E	E	E	E	−1	−1	E	E	E	E	+1	+1	+2	+2	+2

Cumulative tournament scores, relative to par

Birdie	Bogey	Double bogey
