= 1962 Masters Tournament =

- Front cover of the 1962 Masters Guide

Tournament information
- Dates: April 5–9, 1962
- Location: Augusta, Georgia; 33.503°N 82.020°W
- Course: Augusta National Golf Club
- Organized by: Augusta National Golf Club
- Tour: PGA Tour

Statistics
- Par: 72
- Field: 110 players, 52 after cut
- Cut: 149 (+5)
- Prize fund: $109,100
- Winner's share: $20,000

Champion
- (United States) Arnold Palmer
- 280 (−8), playoff
- Location in the United States Location in Georgia

The 1962 Masters Tournament was the 26th Masters Tournament, held April 5–9 at Augusta National Golf Club in Augusta, Georgia. Arnold Palmer won the third of his four Masters titles in the tournament's first three-way playoff. It was the fifth of his seven major titles.

The other two in the 18-hole Monday playoff were also major championship winners: defending champion Gary Player and Dow Finsterwald, winner of the PGA Championship in 1958. Out in 37 and down three strokes to Player at the turn, Palmer shot a 31 on the back nine for 68, while Player shot a 71 and Finsterwald a 77. In the lead after three rounds, Palmer was five-over for his final round after a double bogey at the 10th hole. After five pars, he birdied 16 and 17 to get into the Monday playoff with a 75 (+3). The gallery for the playoff was estimated at 16,000 spectators.

Henry Picard, the 1938 champion, made his final cut at Augusta at age 55. Jack Nicklaus, 22, tied for 15th in his fourth appearance, the first as a professional. He won the next major, the U.S. Open, in a playoff over Palmer at Oakmont near Pittsburgh.

With near misses in 1959 and 1961, Palmer said that it could have been his fifth consecutive title at Augusta.

The 36-hole cut was increased this year to include the low 44 plus ties and anyone within 10 shots of the lead (previously it was the low 40 plus ties). 110 players entered the tournament and 52 made the cut at 149 (+5).

Bruce Crampton won the third Par 3 contest with a score of 22.

== Field ==
1. Masters champions

Jack Burke Jr. (4,8), Jimmy Demaret, Doug Ford (4,9,10,11), Claude Harmon, Ben Hogan (2,3,4,9), Herman Keiser, Cary Middlecoff (2), Byron Nelson (2,4), Arnold Palmer (2,3,8,9,10,11), Henry Picard (4), Gary Player (3,9), Gene Sarazen (2,3,4), Horton Smith, Sam Snead (3,4,8), Art Wall Jr. (10,11)

- Ralph Guldahl (2) and Craig Wood (2) did not play.

The following categories only apply to Americans

2. U.S. Open champions

Tommy Bolt (8), Julius Boros, Billy Burke, Billy Casper (8,11), Jack Fleck, Ed Furgol, Gene Littler (8,9,10,11), Tony Manero, Lloyd Mangrum, Dick Mayer (8), Fred McLeod, Sam Parks Jr., Lew Worsham (8)

3. The Open champions

Jock Hutchison (4), Denny Shute (4)

4. PGA champions

Jerry Barber (10,11), Walter Burkemo (8), Jim Ferrier, Dow Finsterwald (9,11), Vic Ghezzi, Chick Harbert, Chandler Harper, Jay Hebert (11), Lionel Hebert, Johnny Revolta, Bob Rosburg (8), Jim Turnesa

5. U.S. Amateur and Amateur champions

Deane Beman (6,8,a), Dick Chapman (a), Charles Coe (6,8,a), Ed Updegraff (a)

6. Members of the 1961 U.S. Walker Cup team

Gene Andrews (a), Don Cherry (a), Bob Cochran (a), Robert W. Gardner (8,a), Bill Hyndman (a), Billy Joe Patton (a), Charlie Smith (7,a)

- Bud Taylor did not play. Patton was first reserve for the team. Nicklaus had turned professional but qualified under other categories.

7. 1961 U.S. Amateur quarter-finalists

Sam Carmichael (a), Gene Francis (a), Marion Methvin (a), Richard Norville (a), Dudley Wysong (a)

8. Top 24 players and ties from the 1961 Masters Tournament

Bill Collins (11), Paul Harney, Fred Hawkins, Don January (10), Ted Kroll (10), Jack Nicklaus (9), Johnny Pott (10), Doug Sanders (9,10), Ken Venturi

9. Top 16 players and ties from the 1961 U.S. Open

Jacky Cupit, Gardner Dickinson, Dave Douglas, Al Geiberger, Bob Goalby, Eric Monti, Mike Souchak (11)

10. Top eight players and ties from 1961 PGA Championship

Wes Ellis

11. Members of the U.S. 1961 Ryder Cup team

12. Two players selected for meritorious records on the fall part of the 1961 PGA Tour

George Bayer, Gay Brewer

13. One player, either amateur or professional, not already qualified, selected by a ballot of ex-Masters champions

Dave Marr

14. One professional, not already qualified, selected by a ballot of ex-U.S. Open champions

Billy Maxwell

15. One amateur, not already qualified, selected by a ballot of ex-U.S. Amateur champions

R. H. Sikes (a)

16. Two players, not already qualified, from a points list based on finishes in the winter part of the 1962 PGA Tour

Dave Ragan, Phil Rodgers

17. Foreign invitations

Ben Arda, Al Balding, David Blair (a), Antonio Cerdá (8), Bob Charles, Gary Cowan (a), Bruce Crampton, Fidel de Luca, Roberto De Vicenzo (8), Gerard de Wit, Bruce Devlin, Juan Antonio Estrada (a), José Maria Gonzalez, Mário Gonzalez, Tom Haliburton, Harold Henning, Denis Hutchinson, Stan Leonard (8), Sebastián Miguel, Ángel Miguel, Kel Nagle (3), Frank Phillips, Chi-Chi Rodríguez, Leopoldo Ruiz, Miguel Sala, Syd Scott, Norman Von Nida, Brian Wilkes

- Numbers in brackets indicate categories that the player would have qualified under had they been American.

== Round summaries ==
=== First round ===
Thursday, April 5, 1962

Place	Player	Score	To par
1	(South Africa) Gary Player	67	−5
2	(United States) Julius Boros	69	−3
T3	(United States) Arnold Palmer	70	−2
T3	(United States) Mike Souchak	70	−2
T3	(United States) Dave Ragan	70	−2
T3	(United States) Gardner Dickinson	70	−2
T7	(United States) George Bayer	71	−1
T7	(United States) Billy Maxwell	71	−1
T7	(United States) Bob Rosburg	71	−1
T7	(United States) Don January	71	−1
T7	(United States) Gene Littler	71	−1

=== Second round ===
Friday, April 6, 1962

Place	Player	Score	To par
1	(United States) Arnold Palmer	70-66=136	−8
2	(South Africa) Gary Player	67-71=138	−6
3	(United States) Gene Littler	71-68=139	−5
4	(United States) Gardner Dickinson	70-71=141	−3
T5	(United States) Julius Boros	69-73=142	−2
T5	(United States) Dow Finsterwald	74-68=142	−2
T5	(United States) Mike Souchak	70-72=142	−2
T8	(Canada) Al Balding	75-68=143	−1
T8	(United States) Dave Ragan	70-73=143	−1
T10	(United States) Jerry Barber	72-72=144	E
T10	(Puerto Rico) Chi-Chi Rodríguez	72-72=144	E
T10	(United States) Billy Maxwell	71-73=144	E
T10	(United States) Bob Rosburg	71-73=144	E
T10	(United States) Don January	71-73=144	E

=== Third round ===
Saturday, April 7, 1962

Place	Player	Score	To par
1	(United States) Arnold Palmer	70-66-69=205	−11
2	(United States) Dow Finsterwald	74-68-65=207	−9
3	(South Africa) Gary Player	67-71-71=209	−7
4	(United States) Gene Littler	71-68-71=210	−6
T5	(United States) Jerry Barber	72-72-69=213	−3
T5	(United States) Gardner Dickinson	70-71-72=213	−3
7	(United States) Julius Boros	69-73-72=214	−2
8	(United States) Gay Brewer	74-71-70=215	−1
T9	(United States) Lionel Hebert	72-73-71=216	E
T9	(United States) Ken Venturi	75-70-71=216	E
T9	(United States) Billy Maxwell	71-73-72=216	E
T9	(United States) Mike Souchak	70-72-74=216	E

=== Final round ===
Sunday, April 8, 1962

==== Final leaderboard ====
Champion
Silver Cup winner (low amateur)
(a) = amateur
(c) = past champion

Top 10
Place	Player	Score	To par	Money (US$)
T1	(United States) Dow Finsterwald	74-68-65-73=280	−8	Playoff
T1	(United States) Arnold Palmer (c)	70-66-69-75=280	−8	Playoff
T1	(South Africa) Gary Player (c)	67-71-71-71=280	−8	Playoff
4	(United States) Gene Littler	71-68-71-72=282	−6	6,000
T5	(United States) Jerry Barber	72-72-69-74=287	−1	3,600
T5	(United States) Jimmy Demaret (c)	73-73-71-70=287	−1	3,600
T5	(United States) Billy Maxwell	71-73-72-71=287	−1	3,600
T5	(United States) Mike Souchak	70-72-74-71=287	−1	3,600
T9	(United States) Charles Coe (a)	72-74-71-71=288	E	0
T9	(United States) Ken Venturi	75-70-71-72=288	E	2,000

Leaderboard below the top 10
Place	Player	Score	To par	Money ($)
T11	(United States) Julius Boros	69-73-72-76=290	+2	1,450
T11	(United States) Gay Brewer	74-71-70-75=290	+2	1,450
T11	(United States) Jack Fleck	72-75-74-69=290	+2	1,450
T11	(South Africa) Harold Henning	75-73-72-70=290	+2	1,450
T15	(United States) Billy Casper	73-73-73-72=291	+3	1,160
T15	(United States) Gardner Dickinson	70-71-72-78=291	+3	1,160
T15	(United States) Paul Harney	74-71-74-72=291	+3	1,160
T15	(United States) Jack Nicklaus	74-75-70-72=291	+3	1,160
T15	(United States) Sam Snead (c)	72-75-70-74=291	+3	1,160
T20	(United States) Jacky Cupit	73-73-72-74=292	+4	1,000
T20	(United States) Lionel Hebert	72-73-71-76=292	+4	1,000
T20	(United States) Don January	71-73-74-74=292	+4	1,000
T20	(United States) Johnny Pott	77-71-75-69=292	+4	1,000
24	(Canada) Al Balding	75-68-78-72=293	+5	1,000
T25	(New Zealand) Bob Charles	75-72-73-74=294	+6	625
T25	(United States) Bob Goalby	74-74-73-73=294	+6	625
T25	(United States) Ted Kroll	72-74-72-76=294	+6	625
T25	(United States) Dave Ragan	70-73-76-75=294	+6	625
T29	(United States) Bill Collins	75-70-75-75=295	+7	500
T29	(Australia) Bruce Crampton	72-75-74-74=295	+7	500
T29	(United States) Cary Middlecoff (c)	75-74-73-73=295	+7	500
T29	(United States) Lew Worsham	75-70-78-72=295	+7	500
T33	(Argentina) Roberto De Vicenzo	77-72-70-77=296	+8	500
T33	(United States) Lloyd Mangrum	75-74-71-76=296	+8	500
T33	(United States) Byron Nelson (c)	72-76-72-76=296	+8	500
T33	(Puerto Rico) Chi-Chi Rodríguez	72-72-75-77=296	+8	500
T33	(United States) Doug Sanders	74-74-73-75=296	+8	500
38	(United States) Ben Hogan (c)	78-71-75-73=297	+9	500
T39	(United States) Jack Burke Jr. (c)	78-69-73-78=298	+10	500
T39	(Argentina) Antonio Cerdá	74-75-75-74=298	+10	500
T39	(United States) Henry Picard (c)	75-73-76-74=298	+10	500
42	(United States) Don Cherry (a)	77-72-73-77=299	+11	0
43	(United States) Chick Harbert	75-74-74-77=300	+12	500
T44	(United States) George Bayer	71-76-74-80=301	+13	500
T44	(United States) Doug Ford (c)	75-72-76-78=301	+13	500
T44	(Brazil) José Maria Gonzalez	75-74-73-79=301	+13	500
T44	(South Africa) Brian Wilkes	74-75-74-78=301	+13	500
T48	(Mexico) Juan Antonio Estrada (a)	75-74-76-77=302	+14	0
T48	(Brazil) Mário Gonzalez	73-76-77-76=302	+14	500
T48	(United States) Chandler Harper	73-76-79-74=302	+14	500
CUT	(United States) Walter Burkemo	74-76=150	+6	
CUT	(United States) Bob Cochran (a)	80-70=150	+6	
CUT	(Netherlands) Gerard de Wit	76-74=150	+6	
CUT	(United States) Wes Ellis	74-76=150	+6	
CUT	(United States) Dick Mayer	76-74=150	+6	
CUT	(Colombia) Miguel Sala	74-76=150	+6	
CUT	(United States) Charlie Smith (a)	76-74=150	+6	
CUT	(United States) Art Wall Jr. (c)	76-74=150	+6	
CUT	(United States) Sam Carmichael (a)	76-75=151	+7	
CUT	(United States) Dave Douglas	73-78=151	+7	
CUT	(Canada) Stan Leonard	77-74=151	+7	
CUT	(United States) Dave Marr	78-73=151	+7	
CUT	(United States) Marion Methvin (a)	72-79=151	+7	
CUT	(Spain) Ángel Miguel	74-77=151	+7	
CUT	(United States) Eric Monti	77-74=151	+7	
CUT	(Australia) Frank Phillips	79-72=151	+7	
CUT	(United States) Phil Rodgers	76-75=151	+7	
CUT	(England) Syd Scott	75-76=151	+7	
CUT	(United States) Ed Updegraff (a)	74-77=151	+7	
CUT	(South Africa) Denis Hutchinson	76-76=152	+8	
CUT	(United States) Jim Ferrier	80-73=153	+9	
CUT	(United States) Ed Furgol	76-77=153	+9	
CUT	(United States) Tommy Bolt	74-80=154	+10	
CUT	(Argentina) Fidel de Luca	79-75=154	+10	
CUT	(Australia) Kel Nagle	75-79=154	+10	
CUT	(United States) Billy Joe Patton (a)	76-78=154	+10	
CUT	(United States) Jim Turnesa	79-75=154	+10	
CUT	(United States) Deane Beman (a)	80-75=155	+11	
CUT	(Australia) Norman Von Nida	78-77=155	+11	
CUT	(United States) Gene Andrews (a)	77-79=156	+12	
CUT	(Philippines) Ben Arda	79-77=156	+12	
CUT	(Australia) Bruce Devlin	80-76=156	+12	
CUT	(United States) Gene Francis (a)	81-75=156	+12	
CUT	(United States) Al Geiberger	77-79=156	+12	
CUT	(Scotland) Tom Haliburton	83-73=156	+12	
CUT	(United States) Claude Harmon (c)	79-77=156	+12	
CUT	(Spain) Sebastián Miguel	77-79=156	+12	
CUT	(United States) Richard Norville (a)	80-76=156	+12	
CUT	(Argentina) Leopoldo Ruiz	82-74=156	+12	
CUT	(United States) Denny Shute	77-79=156	+12	
CUT	(United States) Dudley Wysong (a)	78-79=157	+13	
CUT	(Scotland) David Blair (a)	81-77=158	+14	
CUT	(United States) Robert W. Gardner (a)	78-80=158	+14	
CUT	(United States) Fred Hawkins	81-77=158	+14	
CUT	(United States) Vic Ghezzi	81-78=159	+15	
CUT	(United States) R. H. Sikes (a)	80-80=160	+16	
CUT	(Canada) Gary Cowan (a)	83-80=163	+19	
CUT	(United States) Sam Parks Jr.	84-79=163	+19	
CUT	(United States) Johnny Revolta	81-82=163	+19	
CUT	(United States) Dick Chapman (a)	80-84=164	+20	
CUT	(United States) Horton Smith (c)	92-88=180	+36	
WD	(United States) Gene Sarazen (c)	74-74=148	+4	
WD	(United States) Jay Hebert	74	+2	
WD	(United States) Herman Keiser (c)	75	+3	
WD	(United States) Bill Hyndman (a)	76	+4	
WD	(United States) Billy Burke			
WD	(United States) Jock Hutchison			
WD	(United States) Tony Manero			
WD	(United States) Fred McLeod			
DQ	(United States) Bob Rosburg	71-73-78=222	+6	

==== Scorecard ====
Final round

Hole	1	2	3	4	5	6	7	8	9	10	11	12	13	14	15	16	17	18
Par	4	5	4	3	4	3	4	5	4	4	4	3	5	4	5	3	4	4
(United States) Palmer	−11	−11	−11	−10	−9	−9	−8	−8	−8	−6	−6	−6	−6	−6	−6	−7	−8	−8
(South Africa) Player	−6	−6	−5	−5	−6	−7	−6	−7	−8	−8	−9	−8	−8	−8	−8	−8	−8	−8
(United States) Finsterwald	−9	−10	−10	−9	−8	−8	−8	−8	−8	−8	−8	−8	−9	−9	−9	−9	−8	−8
(United States) Littler	−6	−6	−7	−7	−7	−7	−7	−7	−7	−6	−6	−6	−6	−6	−6	−6	−7	−6

Cumulative tournament scores, relative to par

Birdie	Bogey	Double bogey

=== Playoff ===
Monday, April 9, 1962

Place	Player	Score	To par	Money ($)
1	(United States) Arnold Palmer	68	−4	20,000
2	(South Africa) Gary Player	71	−1	12,000
3	(United States) Dow Finsterwald	77	+5	8,000

==== Scorecard ====
Hole	1	2	3	4	5	6	7	8	9	10	11	12	13	14	15	16	17	18
Par	4	5	4	3	4	3	4	5	4	4	4	3	5	4	5	3	4	4
(United States) Palmer	E	E	E	E	E	E	+1	+1	+1	E	E	−1	−2	−3	−3	−4	−4	−4
(South Africa) Player	−1	−2	−2	−2	−1	−2	−2	−2	−2	−1	−1	E	E	+1	E	E	E	−1
(United States) Finsterwald	+1	+1	+1	+1	+2	+2	+3	+3	+4	+4	+5	+5	+4	+4	+5	+5	+5	+5
