= 1959 Masters Tournament =

- Front cover of the 1959 Masters Guide

Tournament information
- Dates: April 2–5, 1959
- Location: Augusta, Georgia; 33.503°N 82.020°W
- Course: Augusta National Golf Club
- Organized by: Augusta National Golf Club
- Tour: PGA Tour

Statistics
- Par: 72
- Length: 6,980 yards (6,383 m)
- Field: 87 players, 42 after cut
- Cut: 149 (+5)
- Prize fund: $76,100
- Winner's share: $15,000

Champion
- (United States) Art Wall Jr.
- 284 (−4)

Location map
- Location in the United States Location in Georgia

The 1959 Masters Tournament was the 23rd Masters Tournament, held April 2–5 at Augusta National Golf Club in Augusta, Georgia. Art Wall Jr. shot a final round of 66 (−6), with birdies on five of the last six holes, for his only major title, one stroke ahead of runner-up Cary Middlecoff, the 1955 champion. Wall started the final round six strokes behind the leaders, in a tie for thirteenth place.

Defending champion Arnold Palmer was a third round co-leader, but a triple-bogey at the par-3 12th led to a 74 and a third-place finish, two strokes back. The purse in 1959 was a record $76,100 with a winner's share of $15,000 to Wall. The estimated gallery for the final round on Sunday was 30,000 spectators.

Nineteen-year-old Jack Nicklaus made his Masters debut with 76-74 (150) and missed the cut by one stroke. He played in 45 Masters, the first three as an amateur, and only missed one cut (1967) in the next 34 Masters tournaments. Nicklaus won a record six green jackets and was runner-up four times in his 22 top-10 finishes.

== Field ==
1. Masters champions

Jack Burke Jr. (4,10,11), Jimmy Demaret (8), Doug Ford (4,8,11), Claude Harmon (8), Ben Hogan (2,3,4,8,9), Herman Keiser, Cary Middlecoff (2,8), Byron Nelson (2,4,8), Arnold Palmer (8), Henry Picard (4), Gene Sarazen (2,3,4), Horton Smith, Sam Snead (3,4,8,10), Craig Wood (2)

- Ralph Guldahl (2) did not play.

The following categories only apply to Americans

2. U.S. Open champions

Tommy Bolt (9,10,11), Julius Boros (9,10), Billy Burke, Chick Evans (5,a), Jack Fleck, Ed Furgol (11), Tony Manero, Lloyd Mangrum, Dick Mayer (11), Fred McLeod, Sam Parks Jr., Lew Worsham

3. The Open champions

Jock Hutchison (4), Denny Shute (4)

4. PGA champions

Walter Burkemo (9), Dow Finsterwald (8,10,11), Vic Ghezzi, Chick Harbert (8), Chandler Harper, Lionel Hebert (11), Johnny Revolta, Jim Turnesa

5. U.S. Amateur and Amateur champions

Dick Chapman (a), Charles Coe (6,7,8,9,a), Robert Sweeny Jr. (a)

6. Selections for the 1959 U.S. Walker Cup team

Tommy Aaron (7,a), Deane Beman (7,a), William C. Campbell (a), Bill Hyndman (a), Chuck Kocsis (7,a), Jack Nicklaus (a), Billy Joe Patton (8,a), Bud Taylor (7,a), Ward Wettlaufer (a)

- Campbell and Kocsis were reserves for the team. Harvie Ward did not play.

7. 1958 U.S. Amateur quarter-finalists

Dick Foote (a), Roger McManus (a), Jack Westland (a)

8. Top 24 players and ties from the 1958 Masters Tournament

Billy Casper (9,10), Fred Hawkins (11), Jay Hebert (9,10), Ted Kroll (11), Billy Maxwell, Al Mengert, Phil Rodgers (a), Mike Souchak (10), Ken Venturi, Art Wall Jr. (11), Bo Wininger

9. Top 16 players and ties from the 1958 U.S. Open

Marty Furgol, Bob Goetz, Tommy Jacobs, Don January, Gene Littler, Dick Metz, Bob Rosburg, Frank Stranahan

10. Top eight players and ties from 1958 PGA Championship

Buster Cupit, Ed Oliver

11. Members of the U.S. 1957 Ryder Cup team

12. One player, either amateur or professional, not already qualified, selected by a ballot of ex-Masters champions

Ernie Vossler

13. One professional, not already qualified, selected by a ballot of ex-U.S. Open champions

George Bayer

14. One amateur, not already qualified, selected by a ballot of ex-U.S. Amateur champions

Don Cherry (a)

15. Two players, not already qualified, from a points list based on finishes in the winter part of the 1959 PGA Tour

Paul Harney, John McMullin

16. Winner of the 1958 Canadian Open

Wes Ellis

17. Foreign invitations

Bruce Castator (a), Bruce Crampton, Stan Leonard (8), Henry Martell, Ángel Miguel, Gary Player (9), Dave Thomas, Peter Thomson (3,8), Retief Waltman

- Numbers in brackets indicate categories that the player would have qualified under had they been American.

== Round summaries ==
=== First round ===
Thursday, April 2, 1959

Place	Player	Score	To par
1	(Canada) Stan Leonard	69	−3
T2	(United States) Jack Burke Jr.	71	−1
T2	(United States) Chandler Harper	71	−1
T2	(United States) Arnold Palmer	71	−1
T5	(United States) Tommy Bolt	72	E
T5	(United States) Jay Hebert	72	E
T5	(United States) Gene Littler	72	E
T5	(Spain) Ángel Miguel	72	E
T5	(Australia) Peter Thomson	72	E
T10	(United States) Ben Hogan	73	+1
T10	(United States) Bill Hyndman (a)	73	+1
T10	(United States) Chuck Kocsis (a)	73	+1
T10	(United States) Billy Maxwell	73	+1
T10	(United States) Dick Mayer	73	+1
T10	(South Africa) Gary Player	73	+1
T10	(United States) Mike Souchak	73	+1
T10	(Wales) Dave Thomas	73	+1
T10	(United States) Art Wall Jr.	73	+1

=== Second round ===
Friday, April 3, 1959

Place	Player	Score	To par
1	(United States) Arnold Palmer	71-70=141	−3
2	(Canada) Stan Leonard	69-74=143	−1
T3	(United States) Julius Boros	75-69=144	E
T3	(United States) Paul Harney	75-69=144	E
T3	(United States) Billy Maxwell	73-71=144	E
T3	(Spain) Ángel Miguel	72-72=144	E
T3	(United States) Ed Oliver	75-69=144	E
T3	(United States) Mike Souchak	73-71=144	E
T3	(Wales) Dave Thomas	73-71=144	E
T10	(United States) Walter Burkemo	75-70=145	+1
T10	(United States) Jack Fleck	74-71=145	+1
T10	(United States) Chandler Harper	71-74=145	+1
T10	(United States) Jay Hebert	72-73=145	+1
T10	(United States) Bill Hyndman (a)	73-72=145	+1
T10	(United States) Cary Middlecoff	74-71=145	+1
T10	(United States) Billy Joe Patton (a)	75-70=145	+1
T10	(United States) Bo Wininger	75-70=145	+1

=== Third round ===
Saturday, April 4, 1959

Place	Player	Score	To par
T1	(Canada) Stan Leonard	69-74-69=212	−4
T1	(United States) Arnold Palmer	71-70-71=212	−4
3	(United States) Cary Middlecoff	74-71-68=213	−3
4	(United States) Charles Coe (a)	74-74-67=215	−1
T5	(United States) Walter Burkemo	75-70-71=216	E
T5	(United States) Fred Hawkins	77-71-68=216	E
T5	(United States) Jack Fleck	74-71-71=216	E
T5	(United States) Billy Maxwell	73-71-72=216	E
T5	(United States) Billy Joe Patton (a)	75-70-71=216	E
T10	(United States) Jay Hebert	72-73-72=217	+1
T10	(United States) Ed Oliver	75-69-73=217	+1
T10	(United States) Bo Wininger	75-70-72=217	+1

=== Final round ===
Sunday, April 5, 1959

==== Final leaderboard ====
Champion
Silver Cup winner (low amateur)
(a) = amateur
(c) = past champion

Top 10
Place	Player	Score	To par	Money (US$)
1	(United States) Art Wall Jr.	73-74-71-66=284	−4	15,000
2	(United States) Cary Middlecoff (c)	74-71-68-72=285	−3	7,500
3	(United States) Arnold Palmer (c)	71-70-71-74=286	−2	4,500
T4	(Canada) Stan Leonard	69-74-69-75=287	−1	2,625
T4	(United States) Dick Mayer	73-75-71-68=287	−1	2,625
6	(United States) Charles Coe (a)	74-74-67-73=288	E	0
7	(United States) Fred Hawkins	77-71-68-73=289	+1	2,100
T8	(United States) Julius Boros	75-69-74-72=290	+2	1,740
T8	(United States) Jay Hebert	72-73-72-73=290	+2	1,740
T8	(United States) Gene Littler	72-75-72-71=290	+2	1,740
T8	(United States) Billy Maxwell	73-71-72-74=290	+2	1,740
T8	(United States) Billy Joe Patton (a)	75-70-71-74=290	+2	0
T8	(South Africa) Gary Player	73-75-71-71=290	+2	1,740

Leaderboard below the top 10
Place	Player	Score	To par	Money ($)
T14	(United States) Chick Harbert	74-72-74-71=291	+3	1,425
T14	(United States) Chandler Harper	71-74-74-72=291	+3	1,425
T14	(United States) Ted Kroll	76-71-73-71=291	+3	1,425
T14	(United States) Ed Oliver	75-69-73-74=291	+3	1,425
T18	(United States) Dow Finsterwald	79-68-73-72=292	+4	1,300
T18	(United States) Jack Fleck	74-71-71-76=292	+4	1,300
T18	(United States) Bill Hyndman (a)	73-72-76-71=292	+4	0
T18	(United States) Bo Wininger	75-70-72-75=292	+4	1,300
T22	(United States) Walter Burkemo	75-70-71-77=293	+5	1,275
T22	(United States) Chuck Kocsis (a)	73-75-70-75=293	+5	0
T22	(United States) Sam Snead (c)	74-73-72-74=293	+5	1,275
T25	(United States) Don Cherry (a)	77-71-75-71=294	+6	0
T25	(United States) Doug Ford (c)	76-73-73-72=294	+6	1,200
T25	(United States) Paul Harney	75-69-77-73=294	+6	1,200
T25	(Spain) Ángel Miguel	72-72-76-74=294	+6	1,200
T25	(United States) Mike Souchak	73-71-74-76=294	+6	1,200
T30	(United States) Tommy Bolt	72-75-72-76=295	+7	350
T30	(United States) Ben Hogan (c)	73-74-76-72=295	+7	350
T30	(United States) Bob Rosburg	75-74-73-73=295	+7	350
T30	(Wales) Dave Thomas	73-71-77-74=295	+7	350
T34	(United States) Jack Burke Jr. (c)	71-77-76-72=296	+8	350
T34	(United States) Frank Stranahan	74-72-73-77=296	+8	350
36	(United States) Don January	74-75-70-78=297	+9	350
37	(United States) Marty Furgol	74-74-74-76=298	+10	350
38	(United States) Ernie Vossler	74-74-75-76=299	+11	350
39	(United States) Lionel Hebert	77-72-76-75=300	+12	350
40	(United States) George Bayer	74-75-77-77=303	+15	350
CUT	(United States) Deane Beman (a)	74-76=150	+6	
CUT	(Australia) Bruce Crampton	75-75=150	+6	
CUT	(United States) Tommy Jacobs	77-73=150	+6	
CUT	(United States) Jack Nicklaus (a)	76-74=150	+6	
CUT	(United States) Dick Chapman (a)	75-76=151	+7	
CUT	(United States) Claude Harmon (c)	74-77=151	+7	
CUT	(United States) Lloyd Mangrum	74-77=151	+7	
CUT	(United States) Ken Venturi	75-76=151	+7	
CUT	(United States) Ward Wettlaufer (a)	77-74=151	+7	
CUT	(United States) Billy Casper	76-76=152	+8	
CUT	(United States) Wes Ellis	75-77=152	+8	
CUT	(United States) Al Mengert	76-76=152	+8	
CUT	(United States) Dick Metz	78-74=152	+8	
CUT	(United States) Johnny Revolta	76-76=152	+8	
CUT	(United States) Jack Westland (a)	78-74=152	+8	
CUT	(United States) Henry Picard (c)	77-76=153	+9	
CUT	(United States) Jim Turnesa	77-76=153	+9	
CUT	(United States) Vic Ghezzi	74-80=154	+10	
CUT	(United States) Bud Taylor (a)	81-73=154	+10	
CUT	(United States) Tommy Aaron (a)	79-76=155	+11	
CUT	(United States) Buster Cupit	81-74=155	+11	
CUT	(United States) Bob Goetz	78-77=155	+11	
CUT	(United States) Herman Keiser (c)	78-77=155	+11	
CUT	(United States) Phil Rodgers (a)	78-77=155	+11	
CUT	(United States) Ed Furgol	78-78=156	+12	
CUT	(United States) Gene Sarazen (c)	77-79=156	+12	
CUT	(United States) Denny Shute	81-75=156	+12	
CUT	(United States) Lew Worsham	76-80=156	+12	
CUT	(Canada) Henry Martell	80-77=157	+13	
CUT	(United States) John McMullin	78-79=157	+13	
CUT	(United States) William C. Campbell (a)	81-77=158	+14	
CUT	(United States) Robert Sweeny Jr. (a)	81-77=158	+14	
CUT	(United States) Billy Burke	81-78=159	+15	
CUT	(United States) Dick Foote (a)	84-76=160	+16	
CUT	(United States) Roger McManus (a)	81-79=160	+16	
CUT	(South Africa) Retief Waltman	84-77=161	+17	
CUT	(Canada) Bruce Castator (a)	82-80=162	+18	
CUT	(United States) Jimmy Demaret (c)	78-84=162	+18	
CUT	(United States) Craig Wood (c)	83-81=164	+20	
CUT	(United States) Tony Manero	82-83=165	+21	
CUT	(United States) Sam Parks Jr.	86-79=165	+21	
CUT	(United States) Horton Smith (c)	83-83=166	+22	
CUT	(United States) Chick Evans (a)	90-87=177	+33	
WD	(United States) Byron Nelson (c)	75-73=148	+4	
WD	(United States) Jock Hutchison	85	+13	
WD	(United States) Fred McLeod	89	+17	
DQ	(Australia) Peter Thomson	72-74-71=217	+1	

==== Scorecard ====
Hole	1	2	3	4	5	6	7	8	9	10	11	12	13	14	15	16	17	18
Par	4	5	4	3	4	3	4	5	4	4	4	3	5	4	5	3	4	4
(United States) Wall	+1	E	E	E	E	E	+1	E	E	+1	+1	+1	E	−1	−2	−2	−3	−4
(United States) Middlecoff	−3	−2	−2	−1	−1	−1	−1	−2	−2	−2	−1	−1	−2	−1	−3	−3	−3	−3
(United States) Palmer	−4	−4	−4	−4	−4	−3	−3	−4	−4	−4	−4	−1	−2	−2	−3	−3	−2	−2
(Canada) Leonard	−4	−4	−4	−3	−3	−3	−2	−2	−1	−1	−1	−1	−2	−2	−2	−2	−1	−1

Cumulative tournament scores, relative to par

Eagle	Birdie	Bogey	Double bogey	Triple bogey+
