= Eastern Open Invitational =

Golf tournament on the PGA Tour

Tournament information
- Location: Lutherville, Maryland
- Established: 1950
- Course: Pine Ridge Golf Club
- Par: 72
- Tour: PGA Tour
- Format: Stroke play
- Prize fund: US$35,000
- Month played: June
- Final year: 1962

Tournament record score
- Aggregate: 273 Dave Ragan (1959); 273 Gene Littler (1960)
- To par: −15 as above

Final champion
- (United States) Doug Ford
- Location in the United States Location in Maryland

The Eastern Open Invitational, first played as the Eastern Open, was a golf tournament on the PGA Tour that was played in Maryland in the 1950s and early 1960s. The first nine events were played at Mt. Pleasant Municipal Golf Club in Baltimore, an 18-hole par-71 public course designed by Gus Hook and opened in 1933. For the next three years beginning with the 1959 event, the tournament moved to the new Pine Ridge Golf Club in Lutherville, three miles north of downtown Towson. This course, which overlooks the Loch Raven Reservoir, was built by Gus Hook in 1958. The tournament moved back to Mt. Pleasant after the 1961 event.

== Winners ==
| Year | Winner | Score | To par | Margin of victory | Runner(s)-up | Winner's share ($) |
Eastern Open Invitational
| 1962 | (United States) Doug Ford | 279 | −9 | 1 stroke | (United States) Bob Goalby | 5,300 |
| 1961 | (United States) Doug Sanders | 275 | −13 | 1 stroke | (United States) Ken Venturi | 5,300 |
| 1960 | (United States) Gene Littler | 273 | −15 | 2 strokes | (South Africa) Gary Player | 3,500 |
| 1959 | (United States) Dave Ragan | 273 | −15 | 1 stroke | (United States) Gene Littler | 2,800 |
| 1958 | (United States) Art Wall Jr. | 276 | −12 | Playoff | (United States) Jack Burke Jr. (United States) Bob Rosburg | 2,800 |
| 1957 | (United States) Tommy Bolt | 276 | −12 | 4 strokes | (United States) Billy Casper (United States) Fred Hawkins | 2,800 |
Eastern Open
| 1956 | (United States) Arnold Palmer | 277 | −11 | 2 strokes | (United States) Dow Finsterwald | 3,800 |
| 1955 | (United States) Frank Stranahan | 280 | −8 | 1 stroke | (United States) Art Wall Jr. | 3,000 |
| 1954 | (United States) Bob Toski | 277 | −11 | 7 strokes | (United States) Jack Burke Jr. | 4,000 |
| 1953 | (United States) Dick Mayer | 279 | −9 | 4 strokes | (United States) Charlie Bassler (United States) Doug Ford (United States) Chandler Harper | 2,400 |
| 1952 | (United States) Sam Snead | 275 | −13 | 2 strokes | (United States) Ed Oliver | 2,400 |
| 1951 | (United States) Cary Middlecoff | 279 | −9 | 1 stroke | (United States) Jerry Barber | 2,400 |
| 1950 | (United States) Lloyd Mangrum | 279 | −9 | 2 strokes | (United States) Clayton Heafner | 2,600 |
