= Jimmy Clark (golfer) =

American professional golfer (1921–2010)

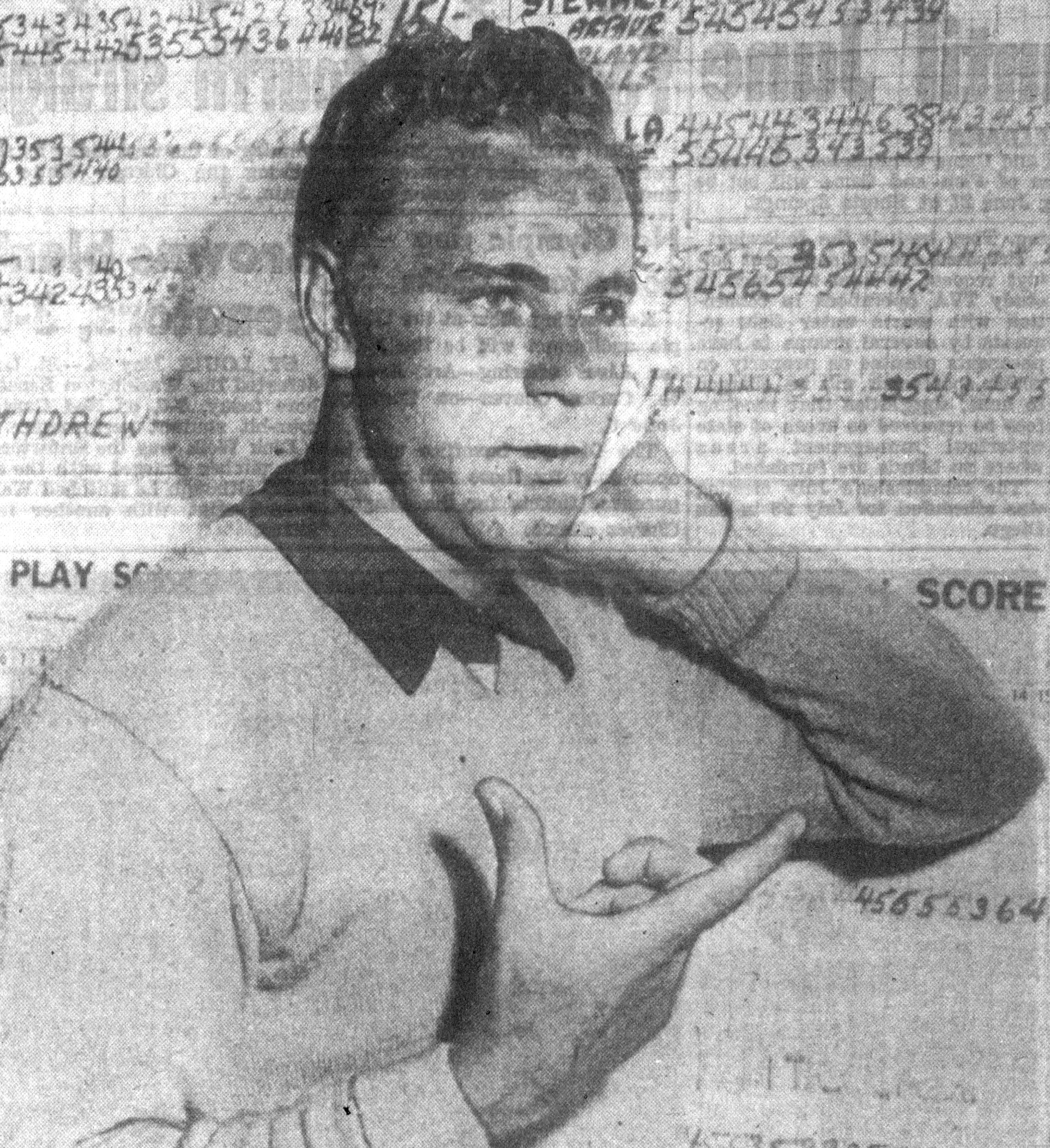
- Clark, circa 1950

Personal information
- Full name: James C. Clark Jr.
- Nationality: United States
- Born: April 24, 1921
- Died: December 7, 2010 (aged 89)

Career
- Sport: Golf
- Status: Professional
- Former tours: PGA Tour; Champions Tour
- Professional wins: 2

Number of wins by tour
- PGA Tour: 2

Best results in major championships
- Masters Tournament: T33: 1954
- PGA Championship: T5: 1953
- U.S. Open: T44: 1963
- The Open Championship: DNP

James C. Clark Jr. (April 24, 1921 – December 7, 2010) was an American professional golfer who played on the PGA Tour in the 1950s and 1960s; and on the Senior PGA Tour in the early 1980s.

== Career ==
A native of Abingdon, Virginia, Clark turned professional in 1946. He won two PGA Tour events, both in 1952. In his first win at the Azalea Open, Clark defeated George Fazio and Jim Turnesa by three strokes with a four-day total of 272 (16-under-par). He was runner-up to Doug Sanders by four strokes at the Greater Greensboro Open in 1963. His best finish in a major was T-33 at the Masters Tournament in 1954.

Clark last played on the Senior Tour in 1983.

== Professional wins (2) ==
=== PGA Tour wins (2) ===
No.	Date	Tournament	Winning score	Margin of victory	Runner(s)-up
1	Mar 30, 1952	Azalea Open	−16 (66-71-67-68=272)	3 strokes	(United States) George Fazio, (United States) Jim Turnesa
2	Aug 25, 1952	Fort Wayne Open	−16 (70-66-67-66=272)	Playoff	(United States) Jim Turnesa

PGA Tour playoff record (1–1)

No.	Year	Tournament	Opponent(s)	Result
1	1952	Fort Wayne Open	(United States) Jim Turnesa	Won 18-hole playoff; Clark: −3 (69), Turnesa: −2 (70)
2	1955	Baton Rouge Open	(United States) Billy Maxwell, (United States) Bo Wininger	Wininger won 18-hole playoff; Wininger: −6 (66), Clark: −2 (70), Maxwell: −1 (71)
