= Fort Wayne Open (PGA Tour event) =

Golf tournament

The Fort Wayne Open, which played for one year as Fort Wayne Invitational, was a golf tournament on the PGA Tour from 1950 to 1956. It was played in Fort Wayne, Indiana. In 1950 it was played at the Orchard Ridge Country Club before moving to the Fort Wayne Elks Lodge No. 155 golf course, now known as the "Elks Course" at Coyote Creek Golf Club, an 18-hole, par-72 championship course built in 1928 and opened in 1929.

Arnold Palmer earned his first professional paycheck ($145) at this event in 1955.

== Winners ==
Year	Player	Country	Score	To par	Margin of victory	Runner(s)-up	Winner's share ($)	Ref
Fort Wayne Open
1956	Art Wall Jr.	United States	269	−19	Playoff	(United States) Gardner Dickinson (United States) Bill Trombley	2,400	
Fort Wayne Invitational
1955	Dow Finsterwald	United States	269	−19	3 strokes	(United States) Doug Ford	2,400	
Fort Wayne Open
1954	Doug Ford	United States	270	−18	3 strokes	(United States) Mike Souchak	2,400	
1953	Art Wall Jr.	United States	265	−23	Playoff	(United States) Cary Middlecoff	2,400	
1952	Jimmy Clark	United States	272	−16	Playoff	(United States) Jim Turnesa	2,400	
1951	Jim Ferrier	Australia	269	−19	1 stroke	(United States) Cary Middlecoff	2,400	
1950	Lloyd Mangrum	United States	271	−13	3 strokes	(United States) Ed Oliver	2,600	

== See also ==
- History of sports in Fort Wayne, Indiana
