= Gardner Dickinson =

American professional golfer (1927–1998)

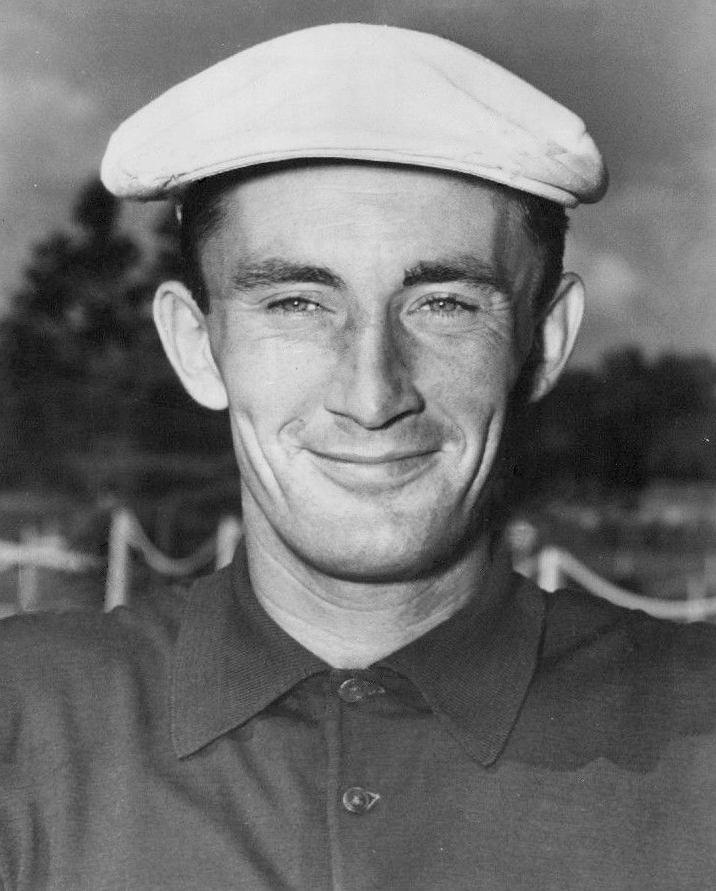

Personal information
- Full name: Gardner Edward Dickinson, Jr.
- Nationality: United States
- Born: September 14, 1927 Dothan, Alabama, U.S.
- Died: April 19, 1998 (aged 70) Tequesta, Florida, U.S.
- Height: 5 ft 10 in (1.78 m)
- Weight: 144 lb (65 kg; 10.3 st)
- Spouse: Judy Clark Dickinson
- Children: 5

Career
- Sport: Golf
- College: Louisiana State
- Turned professional: 1952
- Former tours: PGA Tour; Champions Tour
- Professional wins: 11

Number of wins by tour
- PGA Tour: 7
- Other: 4

Best results in major championships
- Masters Tournament: T10: 1973
- PGA Championship: 5th: 1965
- U.S. Open: T6: 1967
- The Open Championship: CUT: 1969

Gardner Edward Dickinson, Jr. (September 14, 1927 – April 19, 1998) was an American professional golfer.

== Career ==
Born in Dothan, Alabama, Dickinson was a student of Ben Hogan and crafted his swing in the Hogan tradition. He played college golf at Louisiana State, where he and teammate Jay Hebert led the Tigers to the national title in 1947. In a long PGA Tour career, he won seven times between 1956 and 1971. In his last win, the 1971 Atlanta Classic, he beat Jack Nicklaus in a sudden-death playoff.

During his PGA Tour career, Dickinson competed in 12 Masters Championships. His best finish came in 1973, when he tied for tenth. He played on the 1967 and 1971 Ryder Cup teams. With a 9–1–0 match record, Dickinson holds the record for best winning percentage (minimum of seven matches). In team Ryder Cup play, he never lost a match with partner Arnold Palmer (5–0).

Dickinson was one of the founders of the Senior PGA Tour (now Champions Tour). He authored the book Let 'er Rip — a lengthy, bitey rant in which he opines on everything from golf officials and his fellow players to topical issues such as how young people dress. He also designed the 36-hole Frenchman's Creek Club in Palm Beach, Florida.

Dickinson later taught the game to players such as LPGA great JoAnne Carner and his future wife Judy Clark, who is a former player and president of the LPGA Tour.

A well-known quote by Dickinson is: "They say golf is like life, but don't believe them. Golf is more complicated than that."

== Death ==
After a long illness, he died at age 70 in Tequesta, Florida in 1998.

== Awards and honors ==
In 2004, Dickinson was voted into the Palm Beach County Sports Hall of Fame

== Professional wins (11) ==
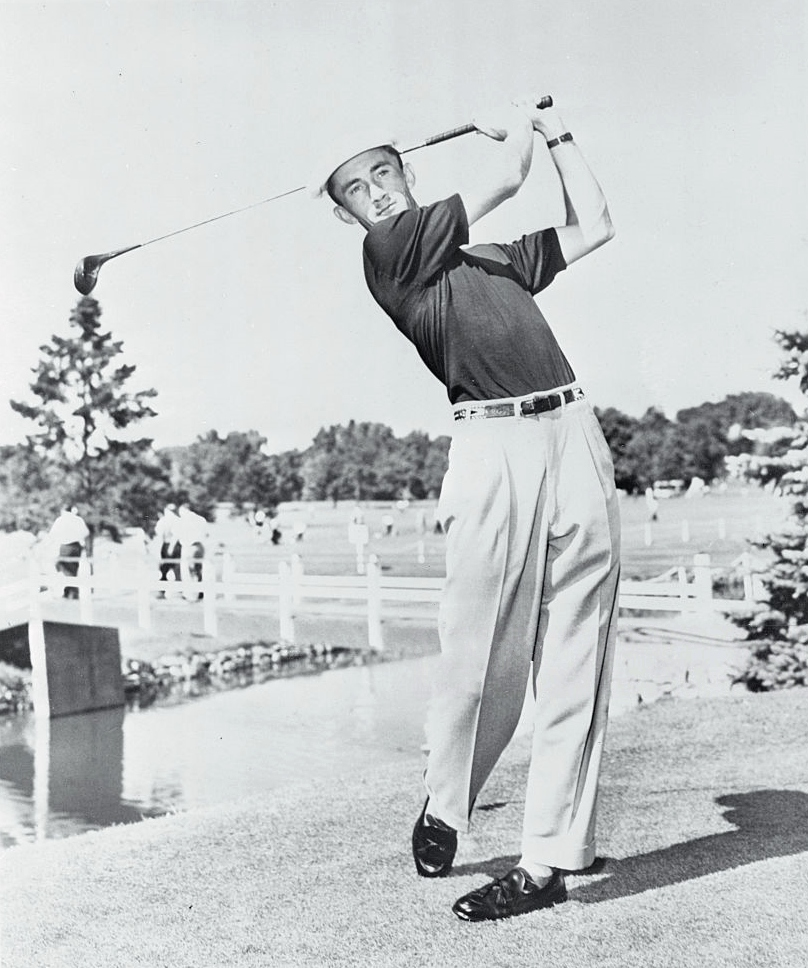
Gardner Dickinson

=== PGA Tour wins (7) ===
No.	Date	Tournament	Winning score	Margin of victory	Runner(s)-up
1	Mar 25, 1956	Miami Beach Open	−16 (64-72-67-69=272)	1 stroke	(United States) Dow Finsterwald, (United States) Billy Maxwell
2	Sep 2, 1957	Insurance City Open Invitational	−12 (66-68-68-70=272)	2 strokes	(United States) George Bayer
3	Dec 9, 1962	Coral Gables Open Invitational	−10 (70-66-67-71=274)	1 stroke	(United States) Bill Collins, (United States) Don Fairfield
4	Jun 25, 1967	Cleveland Open Invitational	−9 (68-66-67-70=271)	4 strokes	(United States) Miller Barber, (United States) Homero Blancas
5	Mar 10, 1968	Doral Open Invitational	−13 (65-71-67-72=275)	1 stroke	(United States) Tom Weiskopf
6	May 18, 1969	Colonial National Invitation	−2 (71-68-73-66=278)	1 stroke	(South Africa) Gary Player
7	Jun 6, 1971	Atlanta Classic	−13 (68-68-69-70=275)	Playoff	(United States) Jack Nicklaus

PGA Tour playoff record (1–2)

No.	Year	Tournament	Opponent(s)	Result
1	1956	Fort Wayne Open	(United States) Bill Trombley, (United States) Art Wall Jr.	Wall won with birdie on first extra hole
2	1969	Greater Jacksonville Open	(United States) Raymond Floyd	Lost to birdie on first extra hole
3	1971	Atlanta Classic	(United States) Jack Nicklaus	Won with par on first extra hole

=== Other wins (4) ===
- 1952 Florida Open
- 1956 West Palm Beach Open
- 1965 Haig & Haig Scotch Foursome (with Ruth Jessen)
- 1978 Legends of Golf (with Sam Snead)

== Results in major championships ==
Tournament	1952	1953	1954	1955	1956	1957	1958	1959
Masters Tournament			32			CUT		
U.S. Open	T44	T21			CUT	CUT		T17
The Open Championship								
PGA Championship								

Tournament	1960	1961	1962	1963	1964	1965	1966	1967	1968	1969
Masters Tournament			T15	CUT	CUT		T28	T36	T22	T29
U.S. Open		T9	T23	T21	CUT	T21	T48	T6	WD	
The Open Championship										CUT
PGA Championship		T19	T51	T8	T23	5	T18	T28	T30	T41

Tournament	1970	1971	1972	1973	1974
Masters Tournament			T22	T10	CUT
U.S. Open					
The Open Championship					
PGA Championship				CUT	

Top 10
Did not play

WD = withdrew
CUT = missed the half-way cut (3rd round cut in 1969 Open Championship)
"T" indicates a tie for a place

=== Summary ===
Tournament	Wins	2nd	3rd	Top-5	Top-10	Top-25	Events	Cuts made
Masters Tournament	0	0	0	0	1	4	12	8
U.S. Open	0	0	0	0	2	7	13	9
The Open Championship	0	0	0	0	0	0	1	0
PGA Championship	0	0	0	1	2	5	10	9
Totals	0	0	0	1	5	16	36	26

- Most consecutive cuts made – 10 (1964 PGA – 1968 Masters)
- Longest streak of top-10s – 1 (four times)

== See also ==
- List of golfers with most PGA Tour wins
