= Bo Wininger =

American professional golfer (1922–1967)

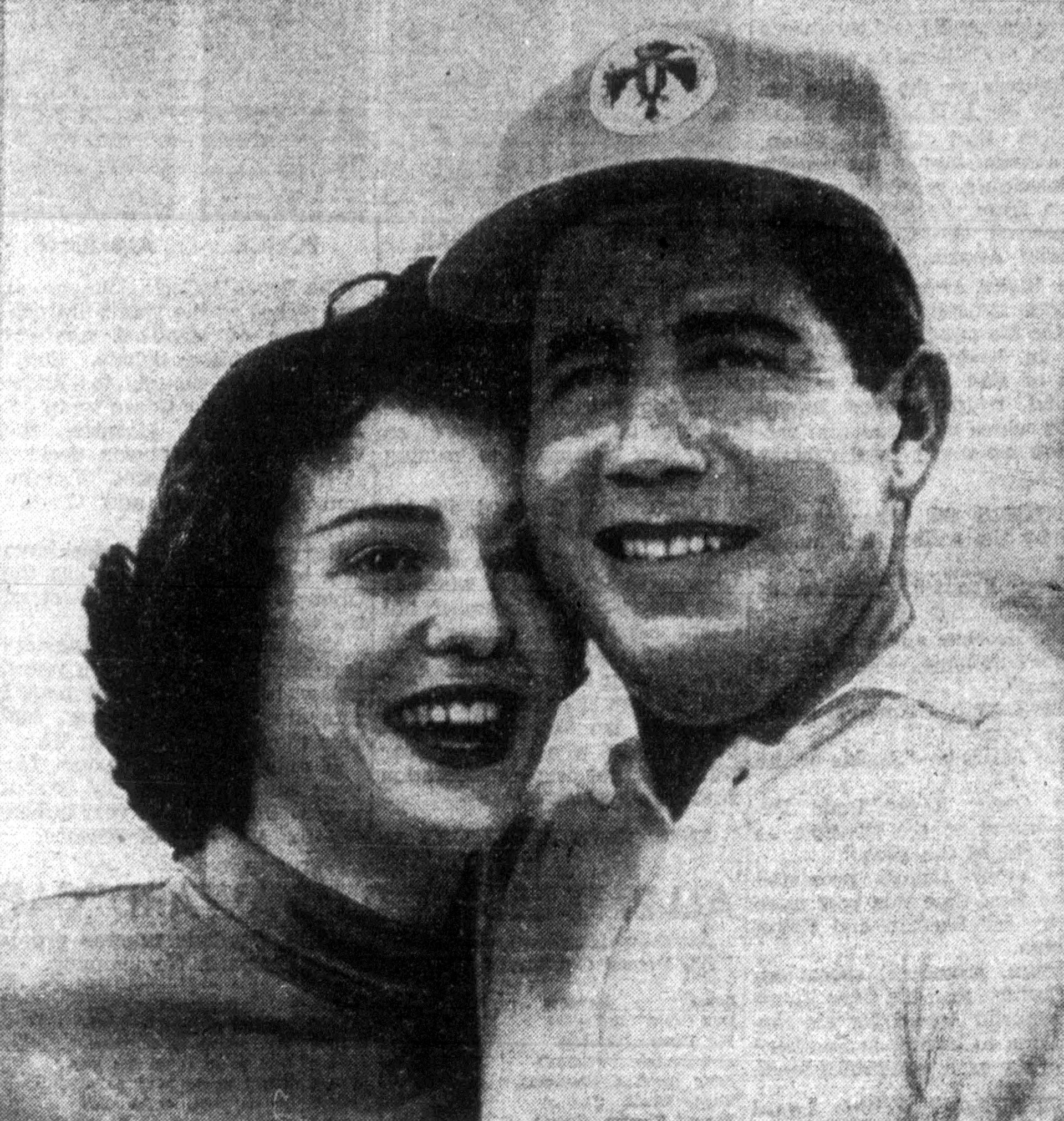
- Wininger and his wife, Rita Joyce Wininger, circa 1954

Personal information
- Full name: Francis G. Wininger
- Nickname: Bo
- Nationality: United States
- Born: November 16, 1922 Chico, California, U.S.
- Died: December 7, 1967 (aged 45) Oklahoma City, Oklahoma, U.S.

Career
- Sport: Golf
- College: Oklahoma A&M
- Turned professional: 1952
- Former tour: PGA Tour
- Professional wins: 7

Number of wins by tour
- PGA Tour: 6
- Other: 1

Best results in major championships
- Masters Tournament: 8th: 1963
- PGA Championship: 4th: 1965
- U.S. Open: T17: 1962
- The Open Championship: DNP

Francis G. "Bo" Wininger (November 16, 1922 – December 7, 1967) was an American professional golfer who played on the PGA Tour in the 1950s and 1960s.

== Early life and amateur career ==
Wininger played on the same high school football and baseball teams in Commerce, Oklahoma as future Yankee great Mickey Mantle, albeit a few years before Mantle came along. He attended Oklahoma State University. Wininger served in the United States Naval Air Corps during World War II.

== Professional career ==
In 1952, Wininger turned pro and joined the PGA Tour in 1953. After winning three times in the mid-1950s, he quit playing the tour full-time in 1959 to take a job in public relations. He returned to his winning ways in the early 1960s, winning the Greater New Orleans Open Invitational in 1962 and 1963 and the Carling Open Invitational in Toronto, Ontario, Canada, in 1962.

Wininger had several runner-up finishes on the PGA Tour in addition to his six wins; these include a 2nd or T-2 finish at the 1957 and 1959 Canadian Open, the 1959 and 1960 Dallas Open Invitational, and the 1959 San Diego Open Invitational. He was the first back-to-back winner in the modern history of the New Orleans tournament. His best finish in a major was 4th place at the 1965 PGA Championship.

== Death ==
Wininger died in Oklahoma City, Oklahoma at the age of 45 after suffering a stroke which left him paralyzed on his right side.

== In popular culture ==
Wininger appeared as himself in an episode of The Lucy Show titled "Lucy Takes Up Golf." Fellow golf pro Jimmy Demaret also appeared in that same episode which first aired on January 27, 1964.

== Professional wins (7) ==
=== PGA Tour wins (6) ===
No.	Date	Tournament	Winning score	Margin of victory	Runner(s)-up
1	Mar 7, 1955	Baton Rouge Open	−10 (70-70-67-71=278)	Playoff	(United States) Jimmy Clark, (United States) Billy Maxwell
2	May 15, 1955	Hot Springs Open	−18 (67-67-68-68=270)	5 strokes	(United States) Doug Ford, (United States) Cary Middlecoff
3	May 20, 1956	Kansas City Open	−15 (64-69-70-70=273)	1 stroke	(United States) Fred Hawkins, (United States) Bob Rosburg
4	Feb 25, 1962	Greater New Orleans Open Invitational	−7 (69-71-73-68=281)	2 strokes	(United States) Bob Rosburg
5	Nov 25, 1962	Carling Open Invitational	−10 (71-71-65-67=274)	1 stroke	(United States) Bert Weaver
6	Mar 4, 1963	Greater New Orleans Open Invitational (2)	–9 (68-70-72-69=279)	3 strokes	(United States) Tony Lema, (United States) Bob Rosburg

PGA Tour playoff record (1–1)

No.	Year	Tournament	Opponents	Result
1	1955	Baton Rouge Open	(United States) Jimmy Clark, (United States) Billy Maxwell	Won 18-hole playoff; Wininger: −6 (66), Clark: −2 (70), Maxwell: −1 (71)
2	1960	Dallas Open Invitational	(United States) Ted Kroll, (United States) Johnny Pott	Pott won with birdie on third extra hole Wininger eliminated by par on first hole

=== Other wins (1) ===
- 1953 Pennsylvania Open Championship
