= Art Wall Jr. =

American professional golfer (1923–2001)

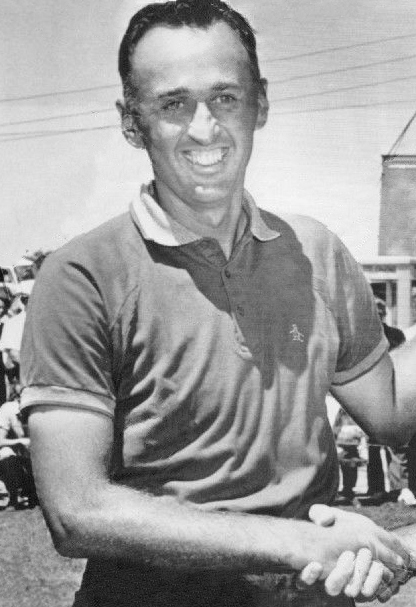
- Wall at the 1959 Buick Open

Personal information
- Full name: Arthur Jonathan Wall Jr.
- Nationality: United States
- Born: November 25, 1923 Honesdale, Pennsylvania, U.S.
- Died: October 31, 2001 (aged 77) Scranton, Pennsylvania, U.S.
- Spouses: Jean Louise Miller Wall (1923–2004)
- Children: 5

Career
- Sport: Golf
- College: Duke University
- Status: Professional
- Former tours: PGA Tour; Senior PGA Tour
- Professional wins: 31

Number of wins by tour
- PGA Tour: 14
- Other: 17

Best results in major championships (wins: 1)
- Masters Tournament: Won: 1959
- PGA Championship: T5: 1961
- U.S. Open: T9: 1967
- The Open Championship: DNP

Achievements and awards
- PGA Tour money list winner: 1959
- PGA Player of the Year: 1959
- Vardon Trophy: 1959

Art Wall Jr.
- Military career
- Allegiance: United States
- Branch: U.S. Army Air Forces
- Service years: 1943–1946
- Conflicts: World War II

Arthur Jonathan Wall Jr. (November 25, 1923 – October 31, 2001) was an American professional golfer, best known for winning the Masters Tournament in 1959.

== Early life and amateur career ==
Wall was born and raised in Honesdale, Pennsylvania. He and his younger brother "Dewey" caddied for their parents, starting around age ten, and began playing shortly after. The brothers served in the military during World War II. Art served in the Army Air Forces and Dewey in the Navy. Dewey was killed at the age of 20 in October 1944 when his submarine USS Shark was sunk in the Pacific Ocean near Taiwan.

Wall won the Pennsylvania Amateur in 1947 and 1949. He attended Duke University and graduated in 1949 with a business degree.

== Professional career ==
Wall won 14 titles on the PGA Tour, including four in 1959. That year he was chosen as the PGA Player of the Year, and also won the money title and Vardon Trophy for lowest scoring average. His most notable career achievement was his victory at the Masters. In the final round in 1959, he birdied five of his last six holes to shoot a 66 and overtake Cary Middlecoff and defending champion Arnold Palmer.

He was a member of three United States Ryder Cup teams: 1957, 1959, and 1961. Wall is also notable for sinking 45 holes-in-one in his playing career (including casual rounds), a world record for many years.

=== Final win ===
Wall's final tour win came as a grandfather at age 51 years 7 months at the Greater Milwaukee Open in 1975, which was his first tour win in nine years.

== Death ==
Wall died at the age of 77 from respiratory failure after a lengthy illness. He is buried at Glen Dyberry Cemetery in Honesdale, Pennsylvania.

== Amateur wins ==
- 1947 Pennsylvania Amateur
- 1949 Pennsylvania Amateur

== Professional wins (31) ==
=== PGA Tour wins (14) ===
Legend
Major championships (1)
Other PGA Tour (13)

No.	Date	Tournament	Winning score	To par	Margin of victory	Runner(s)-up
1	Aug 17, 1953	Fort Wayne Open	66-66-68-65=265	−23	Playoff	(United States) Cary Middlecoff
2	Apr 25, 1954	Tournament of Champions	69-66-70-73=278	−10	6 strokes	(United States) Al Besselink, (United States) Lloyd Mangrum
3	Sep 16, 1956	Fort Wayne Open (2)	70-64-70-65=269	−19	Playoff	(United States) Gardner Dickinson, (United States) Bill Trombley
4	Mar 10, 1957	Pensacola Open	70-68-69-66=273	−15	2 strokes	(Australia) Peter Thomson
5	Jul 6, 1958	Rubber City Open Invitational	65-67-68-69=269	−15	Playoff	(United States) Dow Finsterwald
6	Jul 27, 1958	Eastern Open Invitational	69-69-71-67=276	−12	Playoff	(United States) Jack Burke Jr., (United States) Bob Rosburg
7	Jan 18, 1959	Bing Crosby National Pro-Am	69-65-70-75=279	−9	2 strokes	(United States) Jimmy Demaret, (United States) Gene Littler
8	Mar 30, 1959	Azalea Open Invitational	72-66-71-73=282	−6	3 strokes	(United States) Mike Souchak
9	Apr 5, 1959	Masters Tournament	73-74-71-66=284	−4	1 stroke	(United States) Cary Middlecoff
10	Jul 6, 1959	Buick Open Invitational	71-67-72-72=282	−6	Playoff	(United States) Dow Finsterwald
11	Jul 9, 1960	Canadian Open	66-67-67-69=269	−19	6 strokes	(United States) Bob Goalby, (United States) Jay Hebert
12	Jan 12, 1964	San Diego Open Invitational	71-65-68-70=274	−6	2 strokes	(United States) Tony Lema, (United States) Bob Rosburg
13	Aug 21, 1966	Insurance City Open Invitational	65-64-69-68=266	−18	2 strokes	(United States) Wes Ellis
14	Jul 5, 1975	Greater Milwaukee Open	67-67-67-70=271	−17	1 stroke	(United States) Gary McCord

PGA Tour playoff record (5–5)

No.	Year	Tournament	Opponent(s)	Result
1	1953	Greater Greensboro Open	(United States) Doug Ford, (United States) Sam Snead, (United States) Earl Stewart	Stewart won with par on first extra hole after 18-hole playoff; Stewart: −2 (68), Snead: −2 (68), Ford: E (70), Wall: +2 (72)
2	1953	Fort Wayne Open	(United States) Cary Middlecoff	Won 18-hole playoff; Wall: −2 (70), Middlecoff: E (72)
3	1956	Fort Wayne Open	(United States) Gardner Dickinson, (United States) Bill Trombley	Won with birdie on first extra hole
4	1958	Rubber City Open Invitational	(United States) Dow Finsterwald	Won with birdie on second extra hole
5	1958	Eastern Open Invitational	(United States) Jack Burke Jr., (United States) Bob Rosburg	Won with birdie on first extra hole
6	1959	Buick Open Invitational	(United States) Dow Finsterwald	Won 18-hole playoff; Wall: −1 (71), Finsterwald: +1 (73)
7	1960	Western Open	(Canada) Stan Leonard	Lost to birdie on first extra hole
8	1962	Insurance City Open Invitational	(United States) Bob Goalby	Lost to birdie on seventh extra hole
9	1967	Canadian Open	(United States) Billy Casper	Lost 18-hole playoff; Casper: −6 (65), Wall: −2 (69)
10	1971	Canadian Open	(United States) Lee Trevino	Lost to birdie on first extra hole

=== Caribbean Tour wins (7) ===
- 1963 Caracas Open
- 1964 Maracaibo Open Invitational, Puerto Rico Open, Los Lagartos Open
- 1965 Panama Open, Maracaibo Open Invitational
- 1966 Maracaibo Open Invitational

=== Latin American wins (3) ===
- 1964 Ciudad Barranquilla Open, Mexican Open
- 1966 Caracas Open

=== Other wins (5) ===
- 1956 Philadelphia PGA Championship
- 1962 Philadelphia PGA Championship
- 1963 Philadelphia PGA Championship
- 1965 Philadelphia PGA Championship
- 1971 Philadelphia PGA Championship

=== Other senior wins (2) ===
- 1980 Liberty Mutual Legends of Golf (with Tommy Bolt)
- 1996 Liberty Mutual Legends of Golf - Demaret Division (with Doug Ford)

== Major championships ==
=== Wins (1) ===
Year	Championship	54 holes	Winning score	Margin	Runner-up
1959	Masters Tournament	6 shot deficit	−4 (73-74-71-66=284)	1 stroke	(United States) Cary Middlecoff

=== Results timeline ===
Tournament	1952	1953	1954	1955	1956	1957	1958	1959
Masters Tournament					T34	CUT	T6	1
U.S. Open	47	T26	CUT	T16	CUT	CUT		WD
PGA Championship					R32	R64	T11	T25

Tournament	1960	1961	1962	1963	1964	1965	1966	1967	1968	1969
Masters Tournament	WD		CUT	T21	CUT	T45	CUT	T49	T22	T40
U.S. Open	T43		T11	T40				T9	T50	
PGA Championship	T39	T5	T23	T8			58			CUT

Tournament	1970	1971	1972	1973	1974	1975	1976	1977	1978	1979
Masters Tournament	CUT	T27	CUT	T37	T37	T15	T28	T35	CUT	CUT
U.S. Open		CUT		T45						
PGA Championship			T24			T50	CUT			

Tournament	1980	1981	1982	1983	1984	1985	1986	1987	1988
Masters Tournament	51	CUT	CUT	CUT	CUT	CUT		CUT	CUT
U.S. Open									
PGA Championship									

Note: Wall never played in The Open Championship.

Win
Top 10
Did not play

CUT = missed the half-way cut
WD = withdrew
R64, R32, R16, QF, SF = Round in which player lost in PGA Championship match play
"T" = tied

=== Summary ===
Tournament	Wins	2nd	3rd	Top-5	Top-10	Top-25	Events	Cuts made
Masters Tournament	1	0	0	1	2	5	31	15
U.S. Open	0	0	0	0	1	3	14	9
The Open Championship	0	0	0	0	0	0	0	0
PGA Championship	0	0	0	1	2	7	13	11
Totals	1	0	0	2	5	15	58	35

- Most consecutive cuts made – 7 (1972 PGA – 1976 Masters)
- Longest streak of top-10s – 1 (five times)

== U.S. national team appearances ==
Professional

- Ryder Cup: 1957, 1959 (winners), 1961 (winners)
