= Billy Maxwell =

American professional golfer (1929–2021)

Personal information
- Full name: Billy Joe Maxwell
- Nationality: United States
- Born: July 23, 1929 Abilene, Texas, U.S.
- Died: September 20, 2021 (aged 92) Jacksonville, Florida, U.S.
- Height: 5 ft 7.5 in (1.71 m)
- Weight: 165 lb (75 kg; 11.8 st)

Career
- Sport: Golf
- College: North Texas State College
- Turned professional: 1954
- Former tours: PGA Tour; Champions Tour
- Professional wins: 10

Number of wins by tour
- PGA Tour: 7

Best results in major championships
- Masters Tournament: T5: 1962
- PGA Championship: T5: 1963
- U.S. Open: T5: 1963
- The Open Championship: DNP
- U.S. Amateur: Won: 1951
- British Amateur: T9: 1952

Billy Joe Maxwell (July 23, 1929 – September 20, 2021) was an American professional golfer.

== Early life and amateur career ==
Maxwell was born in Abilene, Texas. He has a twin brother, Bobby, who was also a golfer.

Maxwell played college golf at North Texas State College and helped them win four consecutive NCAA Division I team championships (1949–1952). Maxwell also won the U.S. Amateur title in 1951. After an impressive amateur career, he served in the Army.

== Professional career ==
In 1954, Maxwell turned pro. Maxwell won seven times on the PGA Tour. He also played on the 1963 Ryder Cup team and was elected to the Texas Golf Hall of Fame.

Maxwell resided in Jacksonville, Florida where, along with former PGA touring pro, Chris Blocker, he owned and operated Hyde Park Golf Club, a Donald Ross designed course.

== Amateur wins ==
This list is probably incomplete

- 1951 U.S. Amateur
- 1953 Mexican Amateur

== Professional wins (10) ==
=== PGA Tour wins (7) ===
No.	Date	Tournament	Winning score	Margin of victory	Runner(s)-up
1	Apr 3, 1955	Azalea Open Invitational	−18 (65-68-68-69=270)	1 stroke	(United States) Mike Souchak
2	Apr 22, 1956	Arlington Hotel Open	−16 (64-69-70-69=272)	1 stroke	(United States) George Bayer, (United States) Ernie Vossler
3	Oct 27, 1957	Hesperia Open Invitational	−13 (67-67-67-74=275)	2 strokes	(United States) Dow Finsterwald
4	May 18, 1958	Memphis Open	−13 (69-65-68-65=267)	1 stroke	(United States) Cary Middlecoff
5	Feb 5, 1961	Palm Springs Golf Classic	−14 (68-70-68-68-71=345)	2 strokes	(United States) Doug Sanders
6	Aug 13, 1961	Insurance City Open Invitational	−13 (69-68-68-66=271)	Playoff	(United States) Ted Kroll
7	Sep 3, 1962	Dallas Open Invitational	−3 (68-70-68-71=277)	4 strokes	(United States) Johnny Pott

PGA Tour playoff record (1–2)

No.	Year	Tournament	Opponent(s)	Result
1	1955	Baton Rouge Open	(United States) Jimmy Clark, (United States) Bo Wininger	Wininger won 18-hole playoff; Wininger: −6 (66), Clark: −2 (70), Maxwell: −1 (71)
2	1957	Western Open	(United States) George Bayer, (United States) Doug Ford, (United States) Gene Littler	Ford won with par on third extra hole Littler and Maxwell eliminated by par on first hole
3	1961	Insurance City Open Invitational	(United States) Ted Kroll	Won with birdie on seventh extra hole

=== Other wins (3) ===
this list is probably incomplete

- 1956 Mexican Open
- 1961 Puerto Rico Open
- 1973 Florida Open

== Major championships ==
=== Amateur wins (1) ===
Year	Championship	Winning score	Runner-up
1951	U.S. Amateur	4 & 3	(United States) Joe Gagliardi

=== Results timeline ===
Amateur

Tournament	1950	1951	1952	1953
Masters Tournament			T49	
U.S. Amateur	R16	1	R256	
The Amateur Championship			R16	

Professional

Tournament	1954	1955	1956	1957	1958	1959	1960	1961	1962	1963	1964	1965	1966	1967	1968	1969	1970	1971
Masters Tournament	T43	T18	T34	WD	T9	T8	T25		T5	T15	T18	T26	T39					
U.S. Open		27	12	T8	T27	T26		T22	T8	T5		14	T36		T52			
PGA Championship					T25	T11	T24	T27	WD	T5	T13	T43				T63	T10	T40

Note: Maxwell never played in The Open Championship.

Win
Top 10
Did not play

WD = withdrew
"T" indicates a tie for a place
R256, R128, R64, R32, R16, QF, SF = Round in which player lost in match play

Sources: Masters, U.S. Open and U.S. Amateur, PGA Championship, 1952 British Amateur

=== Summary ===
Tournament	Wins	2nd	3rd	Top-5	Top-10	Top-25	Events	Cuts made
Masters Tournament	0	0	0	1	3	7	13	12
U.S. Open	0	0	0	1	3	6	11	11
The Open Championship	0	0	0	0	0	0	0	0
PGA Championship	0	0	0	1	2	6	11	10
Totals	0	0	0	3	8	19	35	33

- Most consecutive cuts made – 14 (1963 Masters – 1971 PGA)
- Longest streak of top-10s – 2 (three times)

== U.S. national team appearances ==
Professional

- Ryder Cup: 1963 (winners)
