= Bob Rosburg =

American professional golfer (1926–2009)

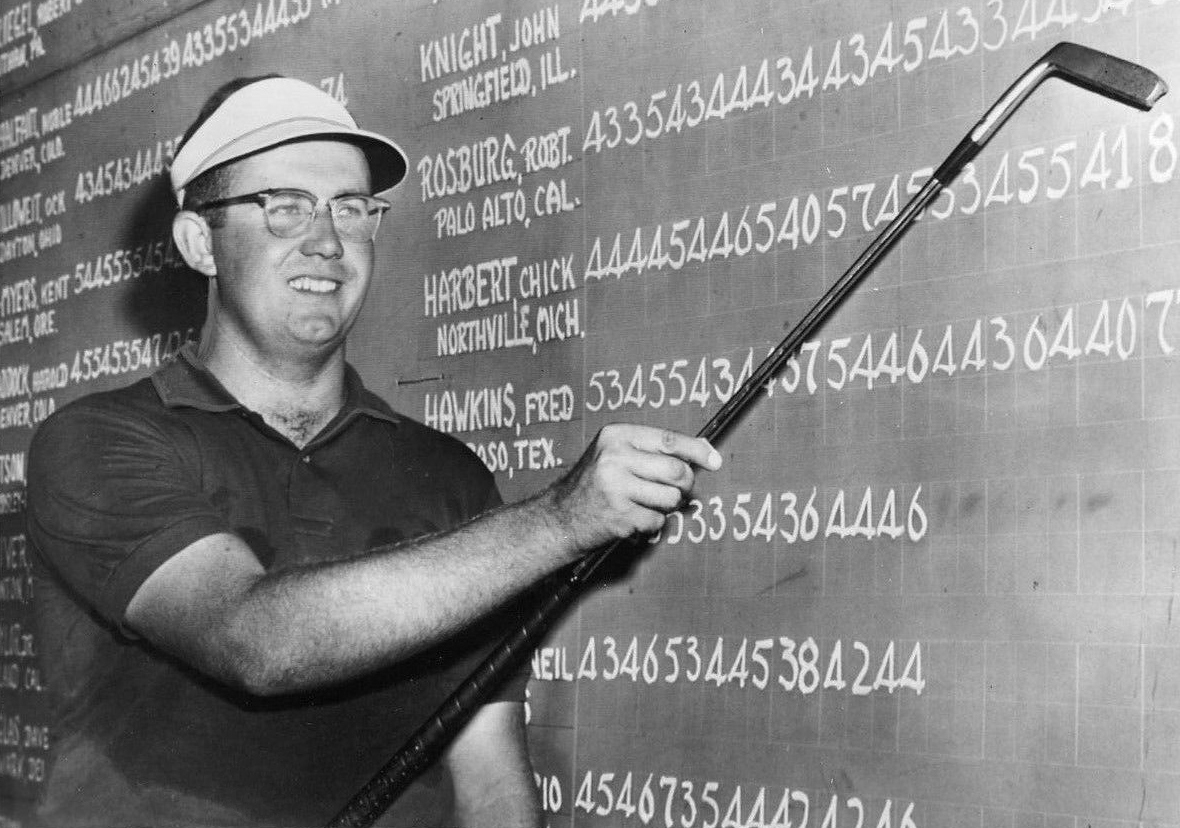
- Rosburg at the 1956 U.S. Open

Personal information
- Full name: Robert Reginald Rosburg
- Nickname: Rossie
- Born: October 21, 1926 San Francisco, California, U.S.
- Died: May 14, 2009 (aged 82) Palm Springs, California, U.S.
- Spouse: Eleanor
- Children: 3

Career
- Sport: Golf
- College: Stanford University
- Turned professional: 1953
- Former tour: PGA Tour
- Professional wins: 10

Number of wins by tour
- PGA Tour: 6
- Other: 4

Best results in major championships (wins: 1)
- Masters Tournament: T4: 1955
- PGA Championship: Won: 1959
- U.S. Open: 2nd/T2: 1959, 1969
- The Open Championship: DNP

Achievements and awards
- Vardon Trophy: 1958

Robert Reginald "Rossie" Rosburg (October 21, 1926 – May 14, 2009) was an American professional golfer who later became a sports color analyst for ABC television.

== Early life and amateur career ==
Rosburg was born in San Francisco, California. He played golf as a junior at the Olympic Club, and at the age of 12, he faced the then-retired baseball Hall of Famer, Ty Cobb, in the first flight of the club championship, and beat Cobb 7 and 6. Rosburg says Cobb was gracious in defeat and shook the young Rosburg's hand, but Cobb took so much kidding from the other Olympic Club members that for many years, Rosburg hardly ever saw Cobb back at the club.

Rosburg was an outstanding baseball player at Stanford University in Palo Alto, California during the 1940s, and almost chose baseball as a career over golf. He graduated from Stanford in 1949. He is a member of the Stanford Athletic Hall of Fame.

== Professional career ==
In 1953, Rosburg turned pro. During his career, Rosburg was one of the most consistent top-10 finishers on the PGA Tour. Rosburg won the Vardon Trophy in 1958 for the lowest average score (70.11) on tour that year. Rosburg's career year was 1959, when he finished seventh on the money list and was named to the Ryder Cup team, after winning the PGA Championship and finishing second in the U.S. Open. In 1969, he won the PGA Club Professional Championship. He won six tour events during the course of his career, before moving into semi-retirement after the 1972 season, his most successful financially. That year, he won the Bob Hope Desert Classic by one stroke over Lanny Wadkins.

The 1959 PGA Championship was played at the Minneapolis Golf Club in St. Louis Park, Minnesota. Rosburg won with a 72-hole score of 277 by one stroke over Jerry Barber and Doug Sanders. Rosburg claimed that he won the 1959 PGA Championship without ever hitting a practice shot during that week, except for a few chips and puts. He came close to winning a second major that year, finishing 2nd at the U.S. Open to Billy Casper. He also finished in a three-way tie for 2nd at the 1969 U.S. Open, one stroke behind Orville Moody.

=== Broadcasting career ===
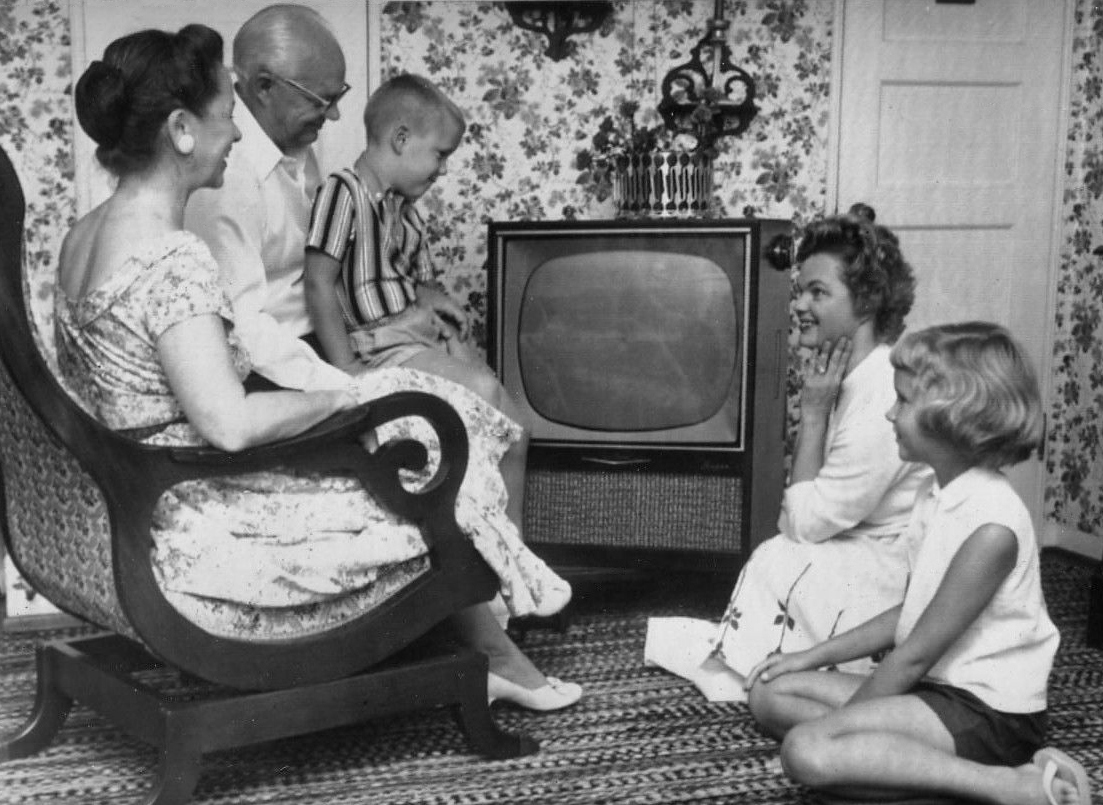
Rosburg's family watch him win the 1959 PGA Championship

After his playing days on the PGA Tour finished in the mid-1970s, Rosburg became a commentator for ABC sports television. He pioneered the now-common practice of roving on the golf course and reporting from the fairways. At the time of his death, he was the longest serving active golf announcer on television, with more than 30 years behind the microphone. He is remembered for his catch phrase, "He's got no chance, Jim", which Rosburg would utter whenever he encountered a golfer who had hit his ball into a seemingly impossible position (usually behind a tree or in deep grass), upon which the player would then produce a miraculous recovery. The "Jim" is in reference to ABC commentator Jim McKay.

Rosburg is also credited with helping ABC hire Judy Rankin, who was the first full-time female golf commentator to cover men's events, including the major championships. Rosburg worked nearly three decades as a commentator with Dave Marr, who, like Rosburg, won a single PGA Championship.

== Personal life ==
Rosburg died in Palm Springs, California after sustaining a head injury in a fall at an Indio, California restaurant. He was survived by his wife and their three children.

== Professional wins (10) ==
=== PGA Tour wins (6) ===
Legend
Major championships (1)
Other PGA Tour (5)

No.	Date	Tournament	Winning score	Margin of victory	Runner(s)-up
1	Dec 12, 1954	Miami Open	−7 (71-68-69-65=273)	1 stroke	(United States) Bo Wininger
2	Sep 2, 1956	Motor City Open	−4 (70-70-72-72=284)	Playoff	(United States) Ed Furgol
3	Oct 7, 1956	Convair-San Diego Open	−18 (70-68-67-65=270)	2 strokes	(United States) Dick Mayer
4	Aug 2, 1959	PGA Championship	−3 (71-72-68-66=277)	1 stroke	(United States) Jerry Barber, (United States) Doug Sanders
5	Jan 22, 1961	Bing Crosby National Pro-Am	−6 (69-67-74-72=282)	1 stroke	(Argentina) Roberto De Vicenzo, (United States) Dave Ragan
6	Feb 13, 1972	Bob Hope Desert Classic	−16 (66-69-72-70-67=344)	1 stroke	(United States) Lanny Wadkins

PGA Tour playoff record (1–5)

No.	Year	Tournament	Opponent(s)	Result
1	1956	Motor City Open	(United States) Ed Furgol	Won with par on first extra hole
2	1958	Eastern Open Invitational	(United States) Jack Burke Jr., (United States) Art Wall Jr.	Wall won with birdie on first extra hole
3	1961	Greater Seattle Open Invitational	(United States) Jacky Cupit, (United States) Dave Marr	Marr won with birdie on first extra hole
4	1961	Bakersfield Open	(United States) Jack Fleck	Lost to birdie on first extra hole
5	1962	Orange County Open Invitational	(United States) Tony Lema	Lost to birdie on third extra hole

=== Other wins (4) ===
- 1957 Mexican Open
- 1959 Utah Open
- 1969 PGA Club Professional Championship
- 1981 Liberty Mutual Legends of Golf (with Gene Littler)

== Major championships ==
=== Wins (1) ===
Year	Championship	54 holes	Winning score	Margin	Runners-up
1959	PGA Championship	6 shot deficit	−3 (71-72-68-66=277)	1 stroke	(United States) Jerry Barber, (United States) Doug Sanders

=== Results timeline ===
Tournament	1948	1949
Masters Tournament	52	
U.S. Open	CUT	
PGA Championship		

Tournament	1950	1951	1952	1953	1954	1955	1956	1957	1958	1959
Masters Tournament					T6	T4	16	CUT		T30
U.S. Open				T21	T29	T5	T45		T5	2
PGA Championship									T11	1

Tournament	1960	1961	1962	1963	1964	1965	1966	1967	1968	1969
Masters Tournament	T20	T15	DQ	CUT	CUT	CUT	T10	T21	T30	
U.S. Open	T23	21	13	CUT	T9	T38	T44			T2
PGA Championship	CUT	T19		T40	T56	CUT	T43	CUT	CUT	CUT

Tournament	1970	1971	1972	1973	1974
Masters Tournament	44		T45		
U.S. Open	T64	T3	CUT		
PGA Championship	63	T9	T53	T66	76

Note: Rosburg never played in The Open Championship.

Win
Top 10
Did not play

CUT = missed the half-way cut (3rd round cut in 1960 PGA Championship)
DQ = disqualified
"T" = tied

=== Summary ===
Tournament	Wins	2nd	3rd	Top-5	Top-10	Top-25	Events	Cuts made
Masters Tournament	0	0	0	1	3	7	17	12
U.S. Open	0	2	1	5	6	10	18	15
The Open Championship	0	0	0	0	0	0	0	0
PGA Championship	1	0	0	1	2	4	16	11
Totals	1	2	1	7	11	21	51	38

- Most consecutive cuts made – 7 (twice)
- Longest streak of top-10s – 2 (three times)

== U.S. national team appearances ==
- Ryder Cup: 1959 (winners)

== See also ==
- List of men's major championships winning golfers
