= Tommy Bolt =

American professional golfer (1916–2008)

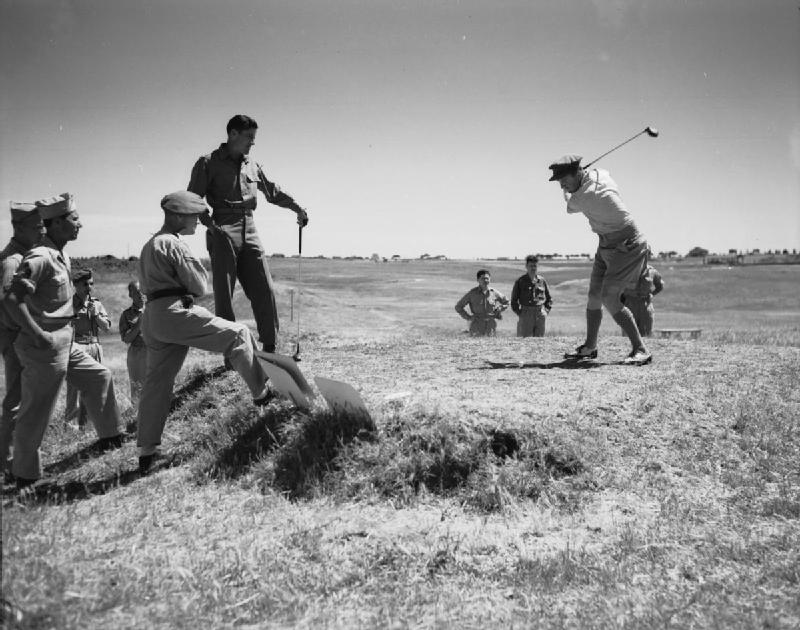
- Bolt and Bobby Locke

Personal information
- Full name: Thomas Henry Bolt
- Nicknames: Thunder, Terrible Tommy
- Nationality: United States
- Born: March 31, 1916 Haworth, Oklahoma, U.S.
- Died: August 30, 2008 (aged 92) Cherokee Village, Arkansas, U.S.
- Height: 5 ft 11 in (1.80 m)
- Weight: 180 lb (82 kg; 13 st)

Career
- Sport: Golf
- Turned professional: 1946
- Former tour: PGA Tour
- Professional wins: 20

Number of wins by tour
- PGA Tour: 15
- Other: 5

Best results in major championships (wins: 1)
- Masters Tournament: T3: 1952
- PGA Championship: 3rd/T3: 1954, 1955, 1971
- U.S. Open: Won: 1958
- The Open Championship: DNP

Achievements and awards
- World Golf Hall of Fame: 2002 (member page)

Thomas Henry Bolt (March 31, 1916 – August 30, 2008) was an American professional golfer. He did not join the PGA Tour until he was in his thirties, but he went on to win 15 PGA Tour titles, including the 1958 U.S. Open. He played in the Ryder Cup in 1955 and 1957.

== Early life ==
Bolt was born in Haworth, Oklahoma. He served in the United States Army during World War II and turned professional in 1946. He worked as a caddie and club professional in Shreveport, Louisiana.

== Professional career ==
Bolt was the fifth PGA Tour player to shoot a round of 60 when he did it in the second round of the 1954 Insurance City Open at the par-71 Wethersfield Country Club, outside Hartford, Connecticut. Previously, Al Brosch, Wally Ulrich, Ted Kroll and Bill Nary had also scored 60. Bolt had 11 birdies in his round and had a putt for a 59, but missed a 15-foot putt for birdie on the 18th green. Bolt had scored 71 in his first round and followed with rounds of 69 and 71 over his final 36 holes. Bolt tied with Earl Stewart, but won an 18-hole playoff the following day.

Bolt was a member of the United States Ryder Cup teams in 1955 and 1957. In 1955, at Thunderbird Country Club in California, he won his two matches, including a singles victory over Christy O'Connor Snr. In the 1957 match at Lindrick Golf Club in England he won his foursomes match but lost to Eric Brown in the singles.

Bolt's fiery disposition earned him the nicknames "Thunder" and "Terrible Tommy". He was known to break clubs during rounds, and his penchant for throwing clubs led to the adoption of a rule prohibiting such behavior. In his later years, he admitted that a lot of his on-course eruptions were merely showmanship and that he felt they had detracted from his playing.

== Death ==
Bolt died in Cherokee Village, Arkansas at the age of 92. He is interred at Evening Shade Cemetery in Evening Shade, Arkansas.

== Awards and honors ==
- In 2002, Bolt was inducted into the World Golf Hall of Fame
- The same year, Bolt was also elected to the Arkansas Sports Hall of Fame

== Professional wins (20) ==
=== PGA Tour wins (15) ===
Legend
Major championships (1)
Other PGA Tour (14)

No.	Date	Tournament	Winning score	Margin of victory	Runner(s)-up
1	Nov 11, 1951	North and South Open	−5 (71-72-71-69=283)	3 strokes	(United States) John Barnum
2	Jan 8, 1952	Los Angeles Open	+5 (73-74-70-72=289)	Playoff	(United States) Jack Burke Jr., (United States) Dutch Harrison
3	Jan 18, 1953	San Diego Open	−14 (66-68-70-70=274)	3 strokes	(United States) Doug Ford
4	Feb 1, 1953	Tucson Open	−15 (65-68-66-66=265)	1 stroke	(United States) Chandler Harper
5	Mar 21, 1954	Miami Beach International Four-Ball (with (United States) Dick Mayer)	−30 (67-61-65-65=258)	Playoff	(United States) Julius Boros and (United States) Dutch Harrison
6	Jun 28, 1954	Insurance City Open	−13 (71-60-69-71=271)	Playoff	(United States) Earl Stewart
7	Sep 5, 1954	Rubber City Open	−23 (69-69-63-64=265)	5 strokes	(United States) Fred Hawkins
8	Jan 23, 1955	Convair-San Diego Open (2)	−14 (64-67-72-71=274)	2 strokes	(United States) Johnny Palmer
9	Feb 13, 1955	Tucson Open (2)	−14 (69-67-65-65=266)	3 strokes	(United States) Bud Holscher, (United States) Art Wall Jr.
10	Jul 10, 1955	St. Paul Open	−19 (65-68-68-68=269)	2 strokes	(United States) Jerry Barber
11	Jul 28, 1957	Eastern Open Invitational	−12 (64-72-69-71=276)	4 strokes	(United States) Billy Casper, (United States) Fred Hawkins
12	May 4, 1958	Colonial National Invitation	+2 (68-70-70-74=282)	1 stroke	(United States) Ken Venturi
13	Jun 14, 1958	U.S. Open	+3 (71-71-69-72=283)	4 strokes	(South Africa) Gary Player
14	Jun 6, 1960	Memphis Open Invitational	−7 (72-69-65-67=273)	Playoff	(United States) Ben Hogan, (United States) Gene Littler
15	Mar 12, 1961	Pensacola Open Invitational	−13 (72-68-68-67=275)	2 strokes	(South Africa) Gary Player

PGA Tour playoff record (4–2)

No.	Year	Tournament	Opponent(s)	Result
1	1952	Los Angeles Open	(United States) Jack Burke Jr., (United States) Dutch Harrison	Won 18-hole playoff; Bolt: −2 (69), Burke: E (71), Harrison: +3 (74)
2	1954	Miami Beach International Four-Ball (with (United States) Dick Mayer)	(United States) Julius Boros and (United States) Dutch Harrison	Won with birdie on first extra hole
3	1954	Insurance City Open	(United States) Earl Stewart	Won 18-hole playoff; Stewart conceded on final hole
4	1955	Miami Open	(United States) Sam Snead	Lost to par on first extra hole
5	1960	Memphis Open Invitational	(United States) Ben Hogan, (United States) Gene Littler	Won 18-hole playoff; Bolt: −2 (68), Hogan: −1 (69), Littler: +1 (71)
6	1961	Home of the Sun Open	(United States) Dave Hill, (United States) Bud Sullivan	Hill won with birdie on third extra hole

=== Senior wins (5) ===
- 1969 PGA Seniors' Championship, World Senior Championship
- 1978 Australian Seniors Championship
- 1980 Liberty Mutual Legends of Golf (with Art Wall Jr.)
- 1995 Liberty Mutual Legends of Golf - Demaret Division (with Jack Fleck)

== Major championships ==
=== Wins (1) ===
Year	Championship	54 holes	Winning score	Margin	Runner-up
1958	U.S. Open	3 shot lead	+3 (71-71-69-72=283)	4 strokes	(South Africa) Gary Player

=== Results timeline ===
Tournament	1950	1951	1952	1953	1954	1955	1956	1957	1958	1959
Masters Tournament			T3	T5	T12	T22	T8	CUT	T32	T30
U.S. Open	CUT	T29	T7	CUT	T6	T3	T22	WD	1	T38
PGA Championship				R32	SF	SF	R128	R16	T5	T17

Tournament	1960	1961	1962	1963	1964	1965	1966	1967	1968	1969
Masters Tournament	T20	T4	CUT	T37	CUT	T8	T17	T26		
U.S. Open	WD	T22	CUT	CUT				CUT		
PGA Championship	T57	WD	T30		WD					CUT

Tournament	1970	1971	1972	1973	1974	1975	1976	1977
Masters Tournament			CUT					
U.S. Open	CUT							CUT
PGA Championship		3	WD					

Note: Bolt never played in The Open Championship.

Win
Top 10
Did not play

WD = Withdrew
CUT = missed the half-way cut
R128, R64, R32, R16, QF, SF = Round in which player lost in PGA Championship match play
"T" indicates a tie for a place

=== Summary ===
Tournament	Wins	2nd	3rd	Top-5	Top-10	Top-25	Events	Cuts made
Masters Tournament	0	0	1	3	5	9	17	13
U.S. Open	1	0	1	2	4	6	17	8
The Open Championship	0	0	0	0	0	0	0	0
PGA Championship	0	0	3	4	5	7	14	8
Totals	1	0	5	9	14	22	48	29

- Most consecutive cuts made – 10 (1953 PGA – 1956 PGA)
- Longest streak of top-10s – 3 (twice)

== U.S. national team appearances ==
- Ryder Cup: 1955 (winners), 1957
- Hopkins Trophy: 1953 (winners), 1956 (winners)
- Lakes International Cup: 1954 (winners)

== See also ==
- List of golfers with most PGA Tour wins
