= Agua Caliente, Tijuana =

Agua Caliente
- Neighborhood
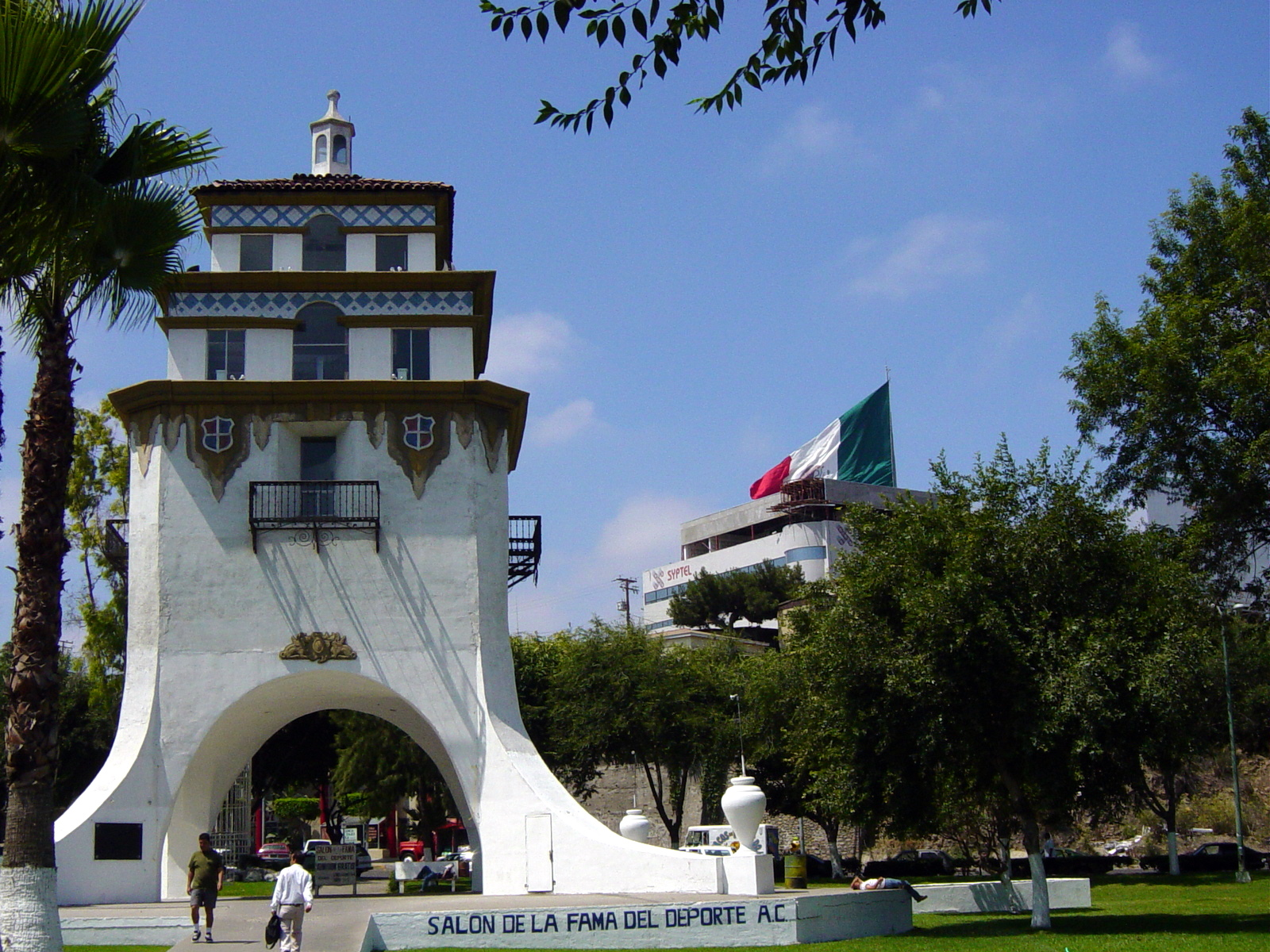
- Tower of Agua Caliente replica.

- Location within Central Tijuana
- Coordinates: 32°30′34″N 116°59′35″W
- Country: Mexico
- State: Baja California
- City: Tijuana
- Time zone: UTC-8 (Pacific Time Zone)
  - Summer (DST): UTC-7 (Pacific Daylight Time)
- ZIP Code: 22000
- Area code: 664

Agua Caliente is a historic entertainment center and present-day district of Tijuana, Baja California, Mexico, at the southeastern end of the Centro borough. The Agua Caliente Tourist Complex formed in the late 1920s along Agua Caliente Boulevard when a road was built that led from the historic Rio Zone to a natural hot springs two miles up the Tijuana River Valley. Paramount icons of Tijuana developed in Agua Caliente such as the Agua Caliente Casino and Hotel and the Agua Caliente Racetrack. Today Agua Caliente is one of Tijuana's paramount tourist centers, the location of some of the city's most affluent neighborhoods, and also contains commercial and other offices along Boulevard Agua Caliente.

== History ==
The hot springs around which the Agua Caliente Tourist Complex grew was a well known location and prior to major development, was the site of small hotels and cabins. With the development of the casino and resort in 1928, Agua Caliente developed as a premier tourist attraction that drew the likes of Charles Chaplin, Rita Hayworth, and Laurel and Hardy. The resort was designed in a Mexican and Californian colonial style, fitted with gardens, its own airstrip, bungalows, minarets, baths, and the casino and hotel itself. The Agua Caliente Club was a golf course adjacent to the city that later became the Tijuana Country Club. In 1930 the golf course had its first PGA Tour event at the Agua Caliente Open, won by Gene Sarazen.

The Agua Caliente Racetrack was constructed one year later in 1929 and was the site of the Agua Caliente Handicap. The race attracted wealthy Southern Californians and was the richest race in North America. In 1935, then Mexican President Lázaro Cárdenas outlawed gambling and the resort was closed. The resort was converted into a technical school and the site gradually fell into a state of disrepair as the resort furnishings were stripped away. Though the race track continued to operate, gambling was not legalized until 1938.

In 1971 the original structure of the racetrack was destroyed in a fire. It was later repaired and continues operation today, though horse racing has been replaced with Greyhound Racing, as the Racetrack of Agua Caliente (Spanish: Hipódromo de Agua Caliente). Plaza Aguacaliente & Grand Hotel Tijuana are a set of twin towers built adjacent to the Tijuana Country Club, constructed in 1982. It was the first major complex built in Agua Caliente after the original Tourist Complex. The early 2000s saw the establishment of Estadio Caliente on the grounds of the racetrack, though the stadium does not interfere with races. The development of the stadium brought Club Tijuana to the city, its first professional soccer team.

== Agua Caliente today ==
In the contemporary era Agua Caliente is one of Tijuana's most developed districts. Along with Avenida Revolucion, it is one of the city's tourist centers and is the site of luxury hotels and numerous shopping centers. It is the city's primary athletic center being home to the only golf course in the city, Auditorio Fausto Gutierrez Moreno, Estadio Caliente, and the Agua Caliente Race Track.

== Commercial area / edge city ==
Part of Agua Caliente along Boulevard Agua Caliente functions as an extension of the city's main commercial district, the Zona Río. The Agua Caliente submarket had, in 2016, 25,043 square metres (269,560 sq ft) of class A and B office space, while the contiguous Zona Río submarket had 111,059 square metres (1,195,430 sq ft), for a total of 136,102 square metres (1,464,990 sq ft). As such, the contiguous Zona Río/Agua Caliente area can be considered an edge city, that is a primary commercial area outside of a traditional downtown.

== Notable landmarks ==
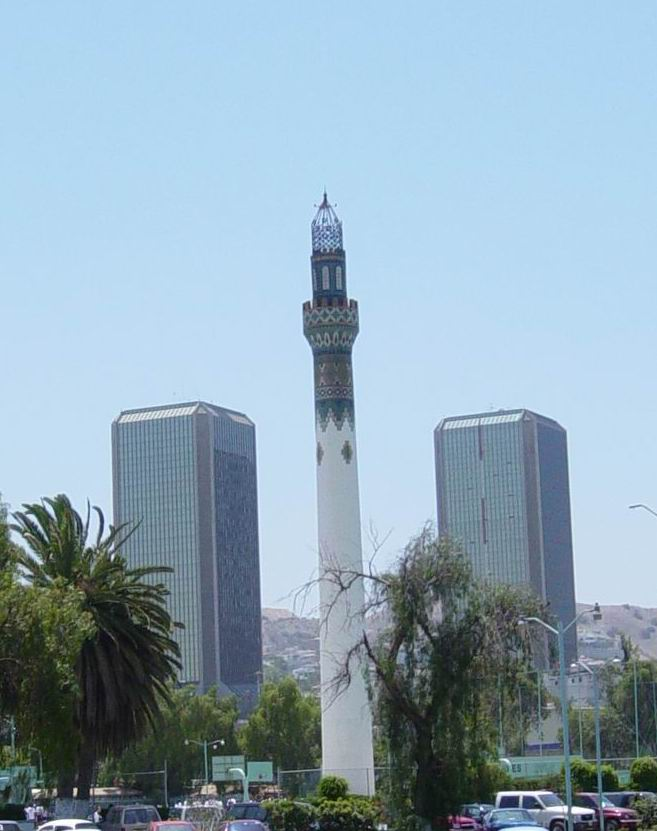
The Minaret

- Agua Caliente Racetrack
- Estadio Caliente
- Agua Caliente Resort and Casino Tower
- The Minaret (Spanish: El Minarete)
- Tijuana Country Club

=== Major buildings on or in Agua Caliente ===
- Centura Tower
- Grand Hotel Tijuana
- Green View Tower

=== Corporate presence ===
The following companies have corporate presence in the area:

- AIG Mexico
- Baker & McKenzie
- Bancomext
- Sony Mexico
- Zurich Financial Services
