= Maracaibo Open Invitational =

Golf tournament

Tournament information
- Location: Maracaibo, Venezuela
- Established: 1960
- Course: Maracaibo Country Club
- Par: 72
- Tour: Caribbean Tour
- Format: Stroke play
- Final year: 1974

Final champion
- (Argentina) Florentino Molina

Location map
- Location in Venezuela

The Maracaibo Open Invitational was a golf tournament in Venezuela played from 1960 to 1974. It was part of the Caribbean Tour. The event was played at Maracaibo Country Club in Maracaibo, Venezuela. In the 1970s the event was sponsored by Ford.

== Winners ==
Year	Player	Country	Score	To par	Margin of victory	Runner-up	Ref
Ford Maracaibo Open
1974	Florentino Molina	Argentina	275	−13	9 strokes	(Argentina) Vicente Fernández	
1973	Peter Oosterhuis	England	277	−11	3 strokes	(England) Tony Jacklin	
1972	Vicente Fernández	Argentina	281	−7	Playoff (Note: Fernández won on the fourth hole of a sudden-death playoff.)	(United States) Roy Pace	
1971	Bert Weaver	United States	284	−4	2 strokes	(Colombia) Juan Pinzón	
1970	Florentino Molina	Argentina	276	−12	2 strokes	(United States) Art Wall Jr.	
Maracaibo Open Invitational
1969	Butch Baird	United States	277	−11	2 strokes	(United States) Steve Oppermann	
1968	Wes Ellis	United States	280	−8	1 stroke	(United States) Rocky Thompson	
1967	Bob McCallister	United States	276	−12	Playoff (Note: McCallister won with a birdie on the first hole of a sudden-death playoff.)	(United States) Wes Ellis	
1966	Art Wall Jr.	United States	276	−12	6 strokes	(United States) Al Besselink	
1965	Art Wall Jr.	United States	271	−17	6 strokes	(United States) Wes Ellis	
1964	Art Wall Jr.	United States	280	−8	3 strokes	(United States) Jim Ferree	
1963	Jim Ferree	United States	288	E	Playoff (Note: Ferree won with a par on the first hole of a sudden-death playoff.)	(United States) John Barnum	
1962	George Knudson	Canada	286	−2	Playoff (Note: Knudson won with a birdie on the second hole of a sudden-death playoff.)	(United States) Jim Ferree	
1961	Don Whitt	United States	283	−5	1 stroke	(Argentina) Roberto De Vicenzo	
1960	Pete Cooper	United States	287	−1	2 strokes	(United States) Bob Hill	
