= Caliente Hipódromo =

Racetrack and casino resort in Mexico

Coordinates: 32°30′24.25″N 116°59′43.77″W

- Interactive map of Caliente Hipódromo
- Location: Tijuana, Mexico; Blvd. Agua Caliente 12027, Hipodromo, 22020 Tijuana, B.C., Mexico
- Opened: 1928; 98 years ago, as Agua Caliente Casino and Hotel; 1929; 97 years ago, as Agua Caliente Racetrack
- Theme: Racing, sports, gambling
- Signature attractions: Greyhound racing, sports arena, sports betting
- Casino type: Land-based
- Owner: Grupo Caliente
- Previous names: Agua Caliente Casino and Hotel, Agua Caliente Racetrack, Agua Caliente Casino and Resort
- Renovated in: December 1929, 2007, 2010s

The Caliente Hipódromo, formerly named the Agua Caliente Racetrack and the Agua Caliente Casino and Resort, is a resort and casino that formerly included a greyhound racing and horse racing track in Tijuana, Baja California, Mexico. The racetrack opened in December 1929 at a cost of $2.5 million, while the adjacent Agua Caliente Casino and Hotel had opened in June 1928, later going defunct in 1935.

After the racetrack underwent renovations, the complex added the Estadio Caliente sports and concert stadium in 2007. Caliente Hipódromo is currently the largest branch of the Casino Caliente casino chain, and beyond the racetrack and arena, it houses a casino with race betting, hundreds of slot machines, a restaurant and a Starbucks café.

== History ==
=== Early years ===
The vast and spectacular Agua Caliente Casino and Hotel opened on June 22, 1928, outside Tijuana, Baja California, Mexico, in what is now the Agua Caliente neighborhood. It was designed by the prominent North American architect Wayne McAllister. Gambling and horse racing were illegal in neighboring California, as was alcohol due to Prohibition, so many wealthy Americans and Hollywood celebrities flocked to Agua Caliente.

An associated racetrack opened in December 1929 at a cost of $2.5 million. Like the resort, the racetrack was designed by Wayne McAllister and built by wealthy Americans Baron Long, a Los Angeles nightclub owner, Wirt Bowman, owner of the Tijuana gambling establishment The Foreign Club, and James Coffroth, a member of the local Tijuana horse racing establishment. Some sources note the fourth partner was Abelardo L. Rodríguez, Military Commander and Governor of Baja California, and future President of Mexico. The lavish resort and racetrack on the Mexican border was popular among Americans, particularly Hollywood celebrities, because drinking, gambling and horse racing were still illegal in most of the neighboring U.S. states. The first manager of the track was Tommy Gorman, who had previously been involved in ice hockey.

=== Horse and greyhound racing ===
Although President Lázaro Cárdenas outlawed gambling in 1935 and closed the resort and casino, the Agua Caliente Racetrack continued to operate for many years. It was the site of several industry firsts, including starting gates, caliente safety helmets, the first track to have a track announcer and "pick six" wagering. Both Phar Lap and Seabiscuit ran and won the Agua Caliente Handicap, which for a time was the richest in North America. The race track is the originator of the Pick 6 (on the North American continent), then known as the 5-10 and later on the 4-9'er. Some racetrackers called it the Big Six.

In 1939 Anna Lee Aldred received her professional license from the Agua Caliente Racetrack, becoming the first U.S. woman to receive a jockey's license. Other riders as Esteban Medina, Aureliano Noguez, Humberto Enriquez, Francisco Mena, Antonio Castanon, Dionicio Navarro and David Flores graced the jockeys' quarters throughout the days of horse racing. Jockey Eddie Arcaro rode his first winner at Caliente in 1932. Trainers such as L. W. Jenner, L. J. Brooks, Wayne Spurling, Juan Garcia, and Roberto Mengaña and El Raton Aviles were among the leading trainers every year.

The original grandstand structure was destroyed by fire in 1971, and while rebuilt as operational, was just a shadow of its opulent beginnings. The racetrack ceased hosting horse racing after 1992, instead only presenting greyhound races from that point on.

In 2015, the dog racing circuit was one of 20 tracks in seven US states and Tijuana - it was the lowest ranked track on the circuit, and the only location in Mexico. At the time, it had 375 dogs, down from 1,000 at its zenith. It ceased racing greyhounds on July 14, 2024.

=== Rebuild and arena ===
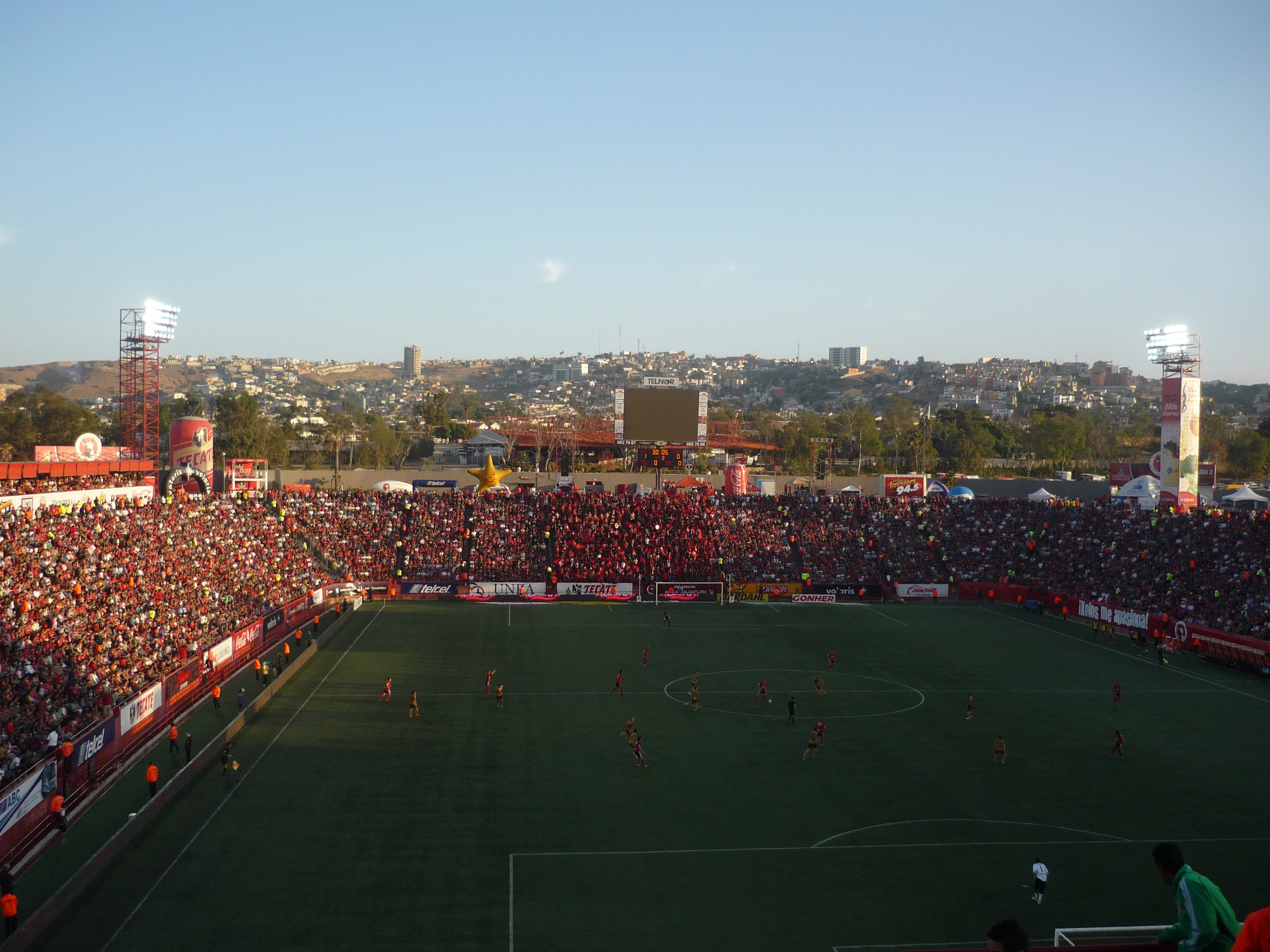
Estadio Caliente pictured in 2012

The resort is currently owned by millionaire politician Jorge Hank who gave the Agua Caliente Casino and Resort its current name "Hipódromo de Agua Caliente", or Caliente Hipódromo.

The Estadio Caliente stadium was built in the grounds and opened in 2007. According to The New York Times, prior to 2007, "the site of Estadio Caliente was a muddy pit surrounded by a defunct racetrack and populated by hippos and alligators, part of a private zoo owned by the millionaire Jorge Hank Rhon" through his family company Grupo Caliente in 2007, he also founded the soccer team Club Tijuana to play at the Caliente Estadio, with the casino and dog-racing track on the next lot. The zoo moved to an adjacent lot. By 2009, the stadium was still under construction and at reduced capacity, as it still was in 2017. By 2017, the stadium had 27,000 seats and was at 90 percent capacity for the winter season.

The resort was renovated in the 2010s.

== Facility and features ==
The casino & property has 340 rooms, golf games, a nightclub, and a spa. Also on the property is the Estadio Caliente. Caliente Hipódromo is currently the largest branch of the Casino Caliente casino chain, and beyond the racetrack and arena, it houses a casino with race betting, hundreds of slot machines, a restaurant and a Starbucks café.

== Bibliography ==
- Vanderwood, Paul J. ''Satan's Playground: Mobsters and Movie Stars at America's Greatest Gaming Resort'' (Duke University Press, 2010)
- Beltran, David Jimenez. The Agua Caliente Story: Remembering Mexico's Legendary Racetrack (2004) Eclipse Press ISBN 1-58150-115-3
- Chris Nichols. The Leisure Architecture of Wayne McAlli (Layton, Utah: Gibbs Smith) 2007
- The Gazette (July 9, 1929), "Eddie Gerard has Resigned Post of Maroon Manager", The Gazette, Montreal
