= Havana Invitational =

Golf tournament

Tournament information
- Location: Havana, Cuba
- Established: 1948
- Course: Havana Country Club
- Par: 72
- Tour: PGA Tour
- Format: Stroke play
- Prize fund: US$15,000
- Month played: November
- Final year: 1958

Tournament record score
- Aggregate: 267 Jim Turnesa (1950)
- To par: −27 as above

Final champion
- (United States) Billy Casper

Location map
- Location in Cuba

The Havana Invitational (Spanish: Torneo de la Habana por invitación) was a pro-am golf tournament held from 1948 to 1958. It was played at Havana Country Club (Club de Campo de La Habana) in Havana, Cuba. In 1958 a second unrelated event was held two weeks before the pro-am, the Havana International. This was held at the Villa Real Golf Club (Club de golf Villa Real).

The 1948 event was a 54-hole event played from Monday 13 December to Wednesday 15 December immediately after the Miami Open which had finished on 12 December. Sam Snead won the individual event with a score of 209 and also won the best-ball with a score of 193. Later events were part of the PGA schedule.

== Winners ==
Year	Winner	Score	To par	Margin of victory	Runner(s)-up	Winner's share ($)	Venue	Ref.
Havana Invitational
1958 (Note: The second 1958 was sanctioned by the PGA Tour, although it was an official money event; the win is considered unofficial.)	(United States) Billy Casper	278	−10	2 strokes	(United States) Bo Wininger	2,400	Havana CC	
Havana International
1958	(United States) George Bayer	286	+6	Playoff (Note: Bayer won with a par on the first hole of a sudden-death playoff.)	(United States) Sam Snead	6,500	Villa Real GC	
Havana Invitational
1957	(Canada) Al Balding	281	−7	Playoff (Note: Balding won with a par on the first hole of a sudden-death playoff.)	(United States) Al Besselink	2,400	Havana CC	
1956	(United States) Al Besselink	276	−12	2 strokes	(United States) Ed Furgol	2,500	Havana CC	
1955	(United States) Mike Souchak	273	−15	2 strokes	(United States) Ed Oliver	2,000	Havana CC	
1954	(United States) Ed Furgol	273	−15	1 stroke	(United States) Walter Burkemo	2,000	Havana CC	
1953	(United States) Bob Toski	272	−16	1 stroke	(United States) Al Besselink (United States) Walter Burkemo (United States) Fred Haas	1,500	Havana CC	
1952	(United States) Dutch Harrison	270	−18	6 strokes	(United States) Al Besselink (United States) Tommy Bolt (United States) Fred Haas	1,500	Havana CC	
1951	(United States) Jimmy Demaret	275	−13	1 stroke	(United States) Bob Toski	1,500	Havana CC	
1950	(United States) Jim Turnesa	267	−21	3 strokes	(United States) Pete Cooper	1,500	Havana CC	
1949	(United States) Claude Harmon	271	−17	2 strokes	(United States) Chick Harbert	1,200	Havana CC	
1948	(United States) Sam Snead	209	−7	1 strokes	(United States) Jimmy Demaret	1,500	Havana CC	
