= Wes Ellis =

American golfer

Personal information
- Full name: Wesley Ellis, Jr.
- Nationality: United States
- Born: January 27, 1932 Kansas City, Missouri, U.S.
- Died: June 4, 1984 (aged 52) Teaneck, New Jersey, U.S.
- Height: 6 ft 1 in (1.85 m)
- Weight: 170 lb (77 kg; 12 st)

Career
- Sport: Golf
- College: University of Texas
- Turned professional: 1954
- Former tour: PGA Tour
- Professional wins: 15

Number of wins by tour
- PGA Tour: 3
- Other: 12

Best results in major championships
- Masters Tournament: T15: 1965
- PGA Championship: T5: 1961
- U.S. Open: T8: 1966
- The Open Championship: DNP

Wesley Ellis, Jr. (January 27, 1932 – June 4, 1984) was an American professional golfer. Ellis, Jr. who played on the PGA Tour in the 1950s, 1960s and 1970s.

== Early life and amateur career ==
Ellis was born in Kansas City, Missouri. He attended the University of Texas in Austin and was a member of the golf team from 1950–1952. Ellis won the Massingill Trophy in 1950, and was the individual medalist at the Southwest Conference Championship in 1952. He graduated in 1953 with a degree in zoology.

== Professional career ==
In 1954, he turned professional. He won three PGA Tour events. His first win came at the 1958 Canadian Open. He won by one stroke over Jay Hebert at the Mayfair Golf and Country Club in Edmonton, Alberta. His last win came in 1965 at the San Diego Open Invitational in a playoff against golf legend Billy Casper. His victory in San Diego was unique in that Ellis used what is commonly known as a "cross-handed" putting grip; that is, as a right-handed golfer he kept his left hand below his right.

Ellis had four top-10 finishes in major championships: a T-9 at the 1956 U.S. Open, a T-8 at the 1966 U.S. Open, a 6th at the 1960 PGA Championship, and a T-5 at the 1961 PGA Championship.

Ellis, like many pro golfers of his generation, earned his living primarily as a club pro. For many years he was the head pro at the Westchester Country Club in Rye, New York and lived in Upper Saddle River, New Jersey.

== Personal life ==
In 1984, Eliis died of kidney disease at the age of 52 at Holy Name Medical Center in Teaneck, New Jersey. He left behind his wife, Marian, and their four children - three daughters and a son.

== Professional wins (15) ==
=== PGA Tour wins (3) ===
| No. | Date | Tournament | Winning score | Margin of victory | Runner(s)-up |
|---|---|---|---|---|---|
| 1 | Aug 23, 1958 | Canadian Open | −13 (67-69-65-66=267) | 1 stroke | (United States) Jay Hebert |
| 2 | Feb 22, 1959 | Texas Open Invitational | −8 (66-71-72-67=276) | 2 strokes | (United States) Bill Johnston, (United States) Tom Nieporte |
| 3 | Jan 17, 1965 | San Diego Open Invitational | −17 (66-65-71-65=267) | Playoff | (United States) Billy Casper |

PGA Tour playoff record (1–1)

| No. | Year | Tournament | Opponent | Result |
|---|---|---|---|---|
| 1 | 1958 | West Palm Beach Open Invitational | (United States) Pete Cooper | Lost to birdie on first extra hole |
| 2 | 1965 | San Diego Open Invitational | (United States) Billy Casper | Won with birdie on first extra hole |

=== Other wins (12) ===
- 1957 Metropolitan Open
- 1961 New Jersey PGA Championship, Metropolitan Open
- 1962 New Jersey State Open, New Jersey PGA Championship
- 1963 New Jersey State Open, New Jersey PGA Championship, Metropolitan Open
- 1964 New Jersey PGA Championship
- 1968 Maracaibo Open Invitational, Westchester PGA Championship
- 1969 Westchester PGA Championship

== Results in major championships ==
| Tournament | 1956 | 1957 | 1958 | 1959 | 1960 | 1961 | 1962 | 1963 | 1964 | 1965 | 1966 | 1967 | 1968 | 1969 | 1970 |
|---|---|---|---|---|---|---|---|---|---|---|---|---|---|---|---|
| Masters Tournament | | CUT | | CUT | | WD | CUT | T24 | T34 | T15 | T36 | T16 | CUT | | |
| U.S. Open | T9 | CUT | | T43 | CUT | T40 | T36 | CUT | | T24 | T8 | T12 | CUT | | CUT |
| PGA Championship | | | | T44 | 6 | T5 | T30 | T17 | CUT | T13 | | 25 | CUT | | |

Note: Ellis never played in The Open Championship.

Top 10
Did not play

WD = withdrew
CUT = missed the half-way cut
"T" indicates a tie for a place

=== Summary ===
| Tournament | Wins | 2nd | 3rd | Top-5 | Top-10 | Top-25 | Events | Cuts made |
|---|---|---|---|---|---|---|---|---|
| Masters Tournament | 0 | 0 | 0 | 0 | 0 | 3 | 10 | 5 |
| U.S. Open | 0 | 0 | 0 | 0 | 2 | 4 | 12 | 7 |
| The Open Championship | 0 | 0 | 0 | 0 | 0 | 0 | 0 | 0 |
| PGA Championship | 0 | 0 | 0 | 1 | 2 | 5 | 9 | 7 |
| Totals | 0 | 0 | 0 | 1 | 4 | 12 | 31 | 19 |

- Most consecutive cuts made – 8 (1965 Masters – 1967 PGA)
- Longest streak of top-10s – 1 (four times)
