= Tournament of Champions (golf) =

Former golf tournament held in the United States

Coordinates: 21.006°N 156.64°W

Tournament information
- Location: Kapalua, Hawaii
- Established: 1953
- Courses: Kapalua Resort (Plantation Course)
- Par: 73
- Length: 7,596 yards (6,946 m)
- Organized by: PGA Tour
- Tour: PGA Tour
- Format: Stroke play
- Prize fund: US$20,000,000
- Month played: January
- Final year: 2025

Tournament record score
- Aggregate: 257 Hideki Matsuyama (2025)
- To par: −35 (Note: PGA Tour scoring record to par.) as above

Final champion
- (Japan) Hideki Matsuyama
- Location in Hawaii

The Tournament of Champions (known as The Sentry from 2024 to 2025) was a golf tournament played on the PGA Tour from 1953 to 2025. The tournament was played in Hawaii on the island of Maui. From 1986 through 2013 and again from 2024 to 2025, it was the opening event of each tour season. For most of its history, the tournament field was restricted to golfers who won a tournament on the tour during the previous calendar year, but players who qualified for the preceding Tour Championship were later invited as well. In 2025, Hideki Matsuyama shot the lowest 72-hole to-par score in the history of the PGA Tour (−35) to win the final edition of the tournament.

== History ==
The tournament is held during the first week of January and, since 1999, has been played over the Plantation Course at the Kapalua Resort near Lahaina on the island of Maui in Hawaii. Unlike most PGA Tour events, it is a par 73 course.

Previous venues have been the Desert Inn Country Club in Las Vegas, Nevada, from the event's inception until 1966, and the Stardust Country Club, also in Las Vegas, in 1967 and 1968. For the following thirty years, it was played at La Costa Resort and Spa in Carlsbad, California; it moved from May in 1985 to January in 1986, and relocated to Maui in 1999.

The tournament has had several title sponsors, the first being Mutual of New York (MONY) between 1975 and 1990. After three years of sponsorship by Infiniti, German car maker Mercedes-Benz began a sixteen-year association with the event and the Tournament of Champions name was dropped. In 2010 the tournament entered a new ten-year agreement with Korean broadcasting company Seoul Broadcasting System, with the tournament being renamed as the SBS Championship. Hyundai took over title sponsorship in 2011 with SBS remaining a sponsor. In 2017, SBS became title sponsor again after Hyundai took over title sponsorship of the PGA Tour event at Riviera Country Club. Sentry Insurance signed on as the event's title sponsor with a five-year agreement starting in 2018, later extended through 2030.

From 2012 to 2015, the tournament used a Friday–Monday format, joining the Deutsche Bank Championship as the only two PGA Tour events with this format. The format allowed the tournament to have its own day to finish, and not compete against the second day of the NFL Wild Card Playoff round.

For the 2021 tournament, the PGA Tour announced that the field would be expanded to include the 30 players qualifying for the 2020 Tour Championship in addition to tournament winners during the 2020 calendar year. The change was made following the cancellation of ten tournaments due to the COVID-19 pandemic. The 2022 edition reverted to the usual winners-only field, but the addition of Tour Championship qualifiers was made permanent in 2023. The tournament had a name change for 2024 as a result, dropping the traditional Tournament of Champions name again. For the 2025 tournament, The Sentry will be an official Signature Event. By rule, the 50 players who qualified for the 2024 BMW Championship, in addition to all winner of the previous year, are eligible. In addition, if a player who qualified for the BMW Championship is deemed not in good standing and ineligible to participate on the PGA Tour, the 51st place player in FedEx Cup standings will be elevated, and so forth.

In September 2025, the PGA Tour announced that the tournament would not be played at its traditional venue, the Plantation Course at Kapalua in Maui, for the 2026 season. The decision was made citing ongoing drought conditions, water conservation mandates, compromised agronomic conditions, and logistical challenges. In October, the tour announced the cancellation of the 2026 event, and that all winners during the 2025 season would instead be invited to the RBC Heritage in April.

On April 20, 2026, the PGA Tour announced that the tournament, along with the Sony Open in Hawaii, would no longer be part of the season schedule moving forward, officially ending the tournament after 73 editions.

== Television ==
While being played at LaCosta, the weekend rounds were traditionally televised by ABC Sports. However, after moving to Hawaii in 1999, the time difference was not conducive to network television. The event moved to ABC's cable partner ESPN for four-round coverage. In 2007, the event moved to four-round coverage on the Golf Channel. In 2012, NBC Sports began showing weekend play, while also producing the new Monday final round for sister network Golf Channel. Starting in 2018, Thursday–Sunday coverage split between Golf Channel and NBC, with the latter picking up weekend coverage when not in conflict with the network's broadcasts of NFL playoff games.

== Winners ==
Year	Winner	Score	To par	Margin of victory	Runner(s)-up	Winner's share ($)
The Sentry
2026	Canceled (Note: In September 2025, the PGA Tour announced that The Sentry would not take place at its usual venue, the Kapalua Resort in Hawaii, due to a drought and a water dispute with the Maui Land & Pineapple Company that left the golf course in poor condition. In October 2025, the PGA Tour announced that the event would be canceled, with players who were tournament winners in 2025 and did not finish inside the Top 50 of the FedEx Cup, eligible to play in the RBC Heritage instead.)					
2025	(Japan) Hideki Matsuyama	257	−35	3 strokes	(United States) Collin Morikawa	3,600,000
2024	(United States) Chris Kirk	263	−29	1 stroke	(United States) Sahith Theegala	3,600,000
Sentry Tournament of Champions
2023	(Spain) Jon Rahm	265	−27	2 strokes	(United States) Collin Morikawa	2,700,000
2022	(Australia) Cameron Smith	258	−34	1 stroke	(Spain) Jon Rahm	1,476,000
2021	(United States) Harris English	267	−25	Playoff	(Chile) Joaquín Niemann	1,340,000
2020	(United States) Justin Thomas (2)	278	−14	Playoff	(United States) Patrick Reed (United States) Xander Schauffele	1,340,000
2019	(United States) Xander Schauffele	269	−23	1 stroke	(United States) Gary Woodland	1,300,000
2018	(United States) Dustin Johnson (2)	268	−24	8 strokes	(Spain) Jon Rahm	1,260,000
SBS Tournament of Champions
2017	(United States) Justin Thomas	270	−22	3 strokes	(Japan) Hideki Matsuyama	1,220,000
Hyundai Tournament of Champions
2016	(United States) Jordan Spieth	262	−30	8 strokes	(United States) Patrick Reed	1,180,000
2015	(United States) Patrick Reed	271	−21	Playoff	(United States) Jimmy Walker	1,140,000
2014	(United States) Zach Johnson	273	−19	1 stroke	(United States) Jordan Spieth	1,140,000
2013	(United States) Dustin Johnson	203 (Note: Shortened to 54 holes due to weather.)	−16	4 strokes	(United States) Steve Stricker	1,140,000
2012	(United States) Steve Stricker	269	−23	3 strokes	(Scotland) Martin Laird	1,120,000
2011	(United States) Jonathan Byrd	268	−24	Playoff	(United States) Robert Garrigus	1,120,000
SBS Championship
2010	(Australia) Geoff Ogilvy (2)	270	−22	1 stroke	(South Africa) Rory Sabbatini	1,120,000
Mercedes-Benz Championship
2009	(Australia) Geoff Ogilvy	268	−24	6 strokes	(United States) Anthony Kim (United States) Davis Love III	1,120,000
2008	(Sweden) Daniel Chopra	274	−18	Playoff	(United States) Steve Stricker	1,100,000
2007	(Fiji) Vijay Singh	278	−14	2 strokes	(Australia) Adam Scott	1,100,000
Mercedes Championships
2006	(Australia) Stuart Appleby (3)	284	−8	Playoff	(Fiji) Vijay Singh	1,080,000
2005	(Australia) Stuart Appleby (2)	271	−21	1 stroke	(United States) Jonathan Kaye	1,060,000
2004	(Australia) Stuart Appleby	270	−22	1 stroke	(Fiji) Vijay Singh	1,060,000
2003	(South Africa) Ernie Els	261	−31	8 strokes	(South Korea) K. J. Choi (United States) Rocco Mediate	1,000,000
2002	(Spain) Sergio García	274	−18	Playoff	(United States) David Toms	720,000
2001	(United States) Jim Furyk	274	−18	1 stroke	(South Africa) Rory Sabbatini	630,000
2000	(United States) Tiger Woods (2)	276	−16	Playoff	(South Africa) Ernie Els	522,000
1999	(United States) David Duval	266	−26	9 strokes	(United States) Mark O'Meara (United States) Billy Mayfair	468,000
1998	(United States) Phil Mickelson (2)	271	−17	1 stroke	(United States) Mark O'Meara (United States) Tiger Woods	306,000
1997	(United States) Tiger Woods	202	−14	Playoff	(United States) Tom Lehman	216,000
1996	(United States) Mark O'Meara	271	−17	3 strokes	(England) Nick Faldo (United States) Scott Hoch	180,000
1995	(Australia) Steve Elkington (2)	278	−10	Playoff	(United States) Bruce Lietzke	180,000
1994	(United States) Phil Mickelson	276	−12	Playoff	(United States) Fred Couples	180,000
Infiniti Tournament of Champions
1993	(United States) Davis Love III	272	−16	1 stroke	(United States) Tom Kite	144,000
1992	(Australia) Steve Elkington	279	−9	Playoff	(United States) Brad Faxon	144,000
1991	(United States) Tom Kite (2)	272	−16	1 stroke	(United States) Lanny Wadkins	144,000
MONY Tournament of Champions
1990	(United States) Paul Azinger	272	−16	1 stroke	(Australia) Ian Baker-Finch	135,000
1989	(United States) Steve Jones	279	−9	3 strokes	(South Africa) David Frost (United States) Jay Haas	135,000
1988	(United States) Steve Pate	202	−14	1 stroke	(United States) Larry Nelson	90,000
1987	(United States) Mac O'Grady	278	−10	1 stroke	(United States) Rick Fehr	90,000
1986	(United States) Calvin Peete	267	−21	6 strokes	(United States) Mark O'Meara	90,000
1985	(United States) Tom Kite	275	−13	6 strokes	(United States) Mark McCumber	72,000
1984	(United States) Tom Watson (3)	274	−14	5 strokes	(United States) Bruce Lietzke	72,000
1983	(United States) Lanny Wadkins (2)	280	−8	1 stroke	(United States) Raymond Floyd	72,000
1982	(United States) Lanny Wadkins	280	−8	3 strokes	(United States) Andy Bean (Australia) David Graham (United States) Craig Stadler (United States) Ron Streck	63,000
1981	(United States) Lee Trevino	273	−15	2 strokes	(United States) Raymond Floyd	54,000
1980	(United States) Tom Watson (2)	276	−12	3 strokes	(United States) Jim Colbert	54,000
1979	(United States) Tom Watson	275	−13	6 strokes	(United States) Bruce Lietzke (United States) Jerry Pate	54,000
1978	(South Africa) Gary Player (2)	281	−7	2 strokes	(United States) Andy North (United States) Lee Trevino	45,000
1977	(United States) Jack Nicklaus (5)	281	−7	Playoff	(United States) Bruce Lietzke	45,000
1976	(United States) Don January (2)	277	−11	5 strokes	(United States) Hubert Green	45,000
1975	(United States) Al Geiberger	277	−11	Playoff	(South Africa) Gary Player	40,000
Tournament of Champions
1974	(United States) Johnny Miller	280	−8	1 stroke	(United States) Buddy Allin (United States) John Mahaffey	40,000
1973	(United States) Jack Nicklaus (4)	276	−12	1 stroke	(United States) Lee Trevino	40,000
1972	(United States) Bobby Mitchell	280	−8	Playoff	(United States) Jack Nicklaus	33,000
1971	(United States) Jack Nicklaus (3)	279	−9	8 strokes	(Australia) Bruce Devlin (South Africa) Gary Player (United States) Dave Stockton	33,000
1970	(United States) Frank Beard (2)	273	−15	7 strokes	(United States) Billy Casper (England) Tony Jacklin (South Africa) Gary Player	30,000
1969	(South Africa) Gary Player	284	−4	2 strokes	(United States) Lee Trevino	30,000
1968	(United States) Don January	276	−8	1 stroke	(United States) Julius Boros	30,000
1967	(United States) Frank Beard	278	−6	1 stroke	(United States) Arnold Palmer	20,000
1966	(United States) Arnold Palmer (3)	283	−5	Playoff	(United States) Gay Brewer	20,000
1965	(United States) Arnold Palmer (2)	277	−11	2 strokes	(United States) Chi-Chi Rodríguez	14,000
1964	(United States) Jack Nicklaus (2)	279	−9	2 strokes	(United States) Al Geiberger (United States) Doug Sanders	12,000
1963	(United States) Jack Nicklaus	273	−15	5 strokes	(United States) Tony Lema (United States) Arnold Palmer	13,000
1962	(United States) Arnold Palmer	276	−12	1 stroke	(United States) Billy Casper	11,000
1961	(United States) Sam Snead	273	−15	7 strokes	(United States) Tommy Bolt	10,000
1960	(United States) Jerry Barber	268	−20	4 strokes	(United States) Jay Hebert	10,000
1959	(United States) Mike Souchak	281	−7	2 strokes	(United States) Art Wall Jr.	10,000
1958	(Canada) Stan Leonard	275	−13	1 stroke	(United States) Billy Casper	10,000
1957	(United States) Gene Littler (3)	285	−3	3 strokes	(United States) Billy Casper (United States) Jimmy Demaret (United States) Dow Finsterwald (United States) Billy Maxwell	10,000
1956	(United States) Gene Littler (2)	281	−7	4 strokes	(United States) Cary Middlecoff	10,000
1955	(United States) Gene Littler	280	−8	13 strokes	(United States) Jerry Barber (United States) Pete Cooper (United States) Bob Toski	10,000
1954	(United States) Art Wall Jr.	278	−10	6 strokes	(United States) Al Besselink (United States) Lloyd Mangrum	10,000
1953	(United States) Al Besselink	280	−8	1 stroke	(United States) Chandler Harper	10,000

Note: Green highlight indicates scoring records.

== Tournament highlights ==
- 1953: Al Besselink wins the inaugural Tournament of Champions (TOC) by one shot over Chandler Harper.
- 1955: Gene Littler is victorious at the TOC for the first time. He wins by 13 shots over Pete Cooper, Jerry Barber, and Bob Toski.
- 1957: For the third consecutive year, Gene Littler is victorious at the TOC. He finishes three shots ahead of Billy Casper, Jimmy Demaret, Dow Finsterwald, and Billy Maxwell.
- 1959: Mike Souchak wins by two shots over Art Wall Jr. in spite of his shooting a final round 77.
- 1960: Jerry Barber shoots 268, a TOC tournament mark for its time in Las Vegas, four shots ahead of Jay Hebert.
- 1962: Arnold Palmer earns his first TOC title. He birdies the 72nd hole to finish one shot ahead of Billy Casper.
- 1963: Jack Nicklaus wins the TOC for the first time. He finishes five shots ahead of Tony Lema and Arnold Palmer.
- 1966: Arnold Palmer successfully defends his TOC title by defeating Gay Brewer 69 to 73 in an 18-hole playoff. For Brewer, it's his second 18-hole playoff loss in a week. In the tournament prior to the TOC, The 1966 Masters Tournament, Brewer was defeated by Jack Nicklaus.
- 1967: Frank Beard prevents Arnold Palmer from winning a third straight TOC. He holes a seven-foot par putt on the 72nd hole to win by one shot over Palmer.
- 1969: Gary Player wins in the United States for the first time since his 1965 U.S. Open triumph. He finishes two shots ahead of Lee Trevino.
- 1972: Bobby Mitchell wins the TOC with a twenty-foot (6 m) birdie putt on the first hole of a sudden-death playoff with Jack Nicklaus.
- 1973: Jack Nicklaus wins the TOC for a fourth time, one stroke ahead of Lee Trevino.
- 1977: Jack Nicklaus collects his fifth and final TOC title with a birdie at the third hole of a sudden-death playoff to defeat Bruce Lietzke.
- 1978: Just like the week previous at Masters, Gary Player comes back from seven shots behind to win, two shots ahead of Andy North and Lee Trevino.
- 1980: Tom Watson wins by three shots over Jim Colbert. The original margin of victory was five shots but Watson was penalized two shots by tour officials after he was overheard giving advice to his playing partner Lee Trevino.
- 1981: Lee Trevino earns his first PGA Tour victory in California, two strokes ahead of Raymond Floyd.
- 1982: Ron Streck comes to the 72nd hole tied with Lanny Wadkins but three-putts to seemingly lose by one shot. After play is finished, Streck is assessed a two-shot penalty for moving a tree branch in his face on the 70th hole. The penalty drops Streck into a four-way tie for second along with Andy Bean, David Graham, and Craig Stadler and costs him over $14,000 in prize money.
- 1985: Tom Kite shoots a first round 64 on his way to a six-shot triumph over Mark McCumber.
- 1986: Calvin Peete shoots a tournament record 267 and finishes six shots ahead of Mark O'Meara.
- 1991: Tom Kite wins his second TOC after Lanny Wadkins three-putts the 71st green from just eighteen feet (5.5 m).
- 1995: Steve Elkington birdies the second hole of a sudden-death playoff to defeat Bruce Lietzke. During the final round, 54-hole leader John Huston putted his ball into a lake.
- 1997: Tiger Woods, the PGA Player of the Year for 1997, birdies the first hole of a sudden-death playoff to defeat Tom Lehman.
- 1999: David Duval wins the first edition of the tournament played in Hawaii, nine shots ahead of Mark O'Meara and Billy Mayfair.
- 2000: Tiger Woods wins his fifth consecutive PGA Tour event. He sinks a forty-foot (12 m) birdie putt on the second hole of a sudden-death playoff to beat Ernie Els.
- 2003: Ernie Els shoots a tournament record 261 on his way to an eight-shot victory over Rocco Mediate and K. J. Choi.
- 2006: Stuart Appleby defeats Vijay Singh on the first hole of a sudden-death playoff and joins Gene Littler as the only winners of the tournament for three consecutive years.
- 2010: Geoff Ogilvy successfully defends his tournament title, one stroke ahead of Rory Sabbatini.
- 2025: Hideki Matsuyama set the record for the lowest 72-hole score with a 35 under par. During the final round at the fifth hole, Taylor Pendrith made the first albatross in event history.
