= Quail Creek Golf & Country Club =

- Interactive map of Quail Creek Golf & Country Club
- 35°35′59″N 97°34′51″W

Club information
- Location: Oklahoma City, Oklahoma; United States
- Established: 1960
- Type: Private
- Tota holes: 18
- Website: www.quailcreekgcc.com
- Designed by: Floyd Farley
- Par: 72
- Length: 7,157 yd (6,544 m)
- Course rating: 75.2
- Slope rating: 140

Quail Creek Golf & Country Club is a private golf and country club located in Oklahoma City, Oklahoma.

== Founding of the Club ==
The Club is situated on 158 acres with 125 acres devoted to the golf course. The plans for Quail Creek Golf & Country Club began in 1960 and the golf course and clubhouse design and construction followed in 1961–62.

Johnston envisioned turning pasture land into a residential area and a golf country club. Quail Creek came to fruition when a steering committee of businessmen headed by elected Chairman, Boston Smith, met on May 6, 1960. After much research, the committee selected a 158-acre section of farmland which was a familiar landmark to Oklahoma City residents, having been the country home of Virgil Browne, a well known civic leader. The committee agreed that 400 members had to be signed in order to assure that the club could be built and plans began to unfold.

== Construction ==
The contract to begin construction of the Club was awarded to Acme Construction Company and ground was officially broken on November 30, 1960. Oklahoma City architectural firm Howard, Samis and Davies was commissioned to design a 40,000 square foot building at an estimated cost of $860,000. They came forward with a building built with more than 2000 tons of creamy beige limestone rock, called Silverdale Stone brought from Silverdale, Kansas. The architects also used large areas of glass.

As the Club finally approached completion the gala opening was set for December 16, 1961. At the time, Ernie Vossler was serving as the head professional. Vossler, who died in 2013, was married to 26-time LPGA tournament winner Marlene Hagge. The Club's first greens superintendent was Ken Hubble.

== Evolution of the Club ==
Since 1960, Quail Creek Golf & Country Club has grown and gone through many changes. It has been expanded, remodeled, repaired, redesigned and updated. The structural changes are evident. Other changes were brought about in order to provide the most modern, up-to-date equipment and improvements available.

Quail Creek Golf & Country Club has played host to many events in the past that include: the Oklahoma City Open 1962 to 1967 (won by Arnold Palmer in 1964 and Tony Lema in 1966), the Southwestern Bell Golf Classic from 1987 to 1990 and the Heartland Pro-Am benefiting the children's daycare center that was devastated in the bombing of the Alfred P. Murrah Federal Building in 1995. In November 1999, a total course renovation was completed.

== Important tournaments hosted ==
- 1962–67 Oklahoma City Open
- 1987 Silver Pages Classic
- 1988–90 Southwestern Bell Classic
