= Charles Cobelle =

French painter and lithographer

Charles Cobelle, born Carl Edelman (1902–1994), was a modern French master of painting, lithography and a fine muralist, who was born in Alsace-Lorraine, France. He is considered the last link to the great tradition of the Open Line School of Paris.

== Biography ==
Cobelle received his bachelor's and master's degrees from the Ludwig-Maximilians-Universität München and continued his studies at the École des Beaux-Arts in Paris. Much more influential in his development, however, were his private studies with Marc Chagall and his apprenticeship in the studio of Raoul Dufy in Menton on the Riviera.

Cobelle lived and painted in Paris until the late 1920s and established himself within the great tradition of the School of Paris. In the late 1920s, Cobelle moved to the United States, where his paintings were immediately sought after by galleries and private collectors alike. Cobelle became a U.S. citizen before the outbreak of World War II. In the late 1940s to 1950s, Cobelle lived in Westport, Connecticut. Charles Cobelle lived in Ridgefield CT in a private lake community called Twixt Hills until his death.

By the 1950s, spurred by the commercial success of his mentor, Dufy, Cobelle had achieved phenomenal success commercially with his Parisian-influenced style. Much like contemporary artists and designers at the time, his designs graced a number of pottery patterns for various pottery companies, including Midwinter Stylecraft, Universal Potteries and Homer Laughlin China Company.

In addition to creating advertising illustrations for everything from hosiery to French perfume, Cobelle created a number of murals throughout the country in noteworthy public locations such as The Painted Desert Room of the Desert Inn in Las Vegas, the Mark Hopkins Hotel in San Francisco, Neiman-Marcus in Dallas and on the cruise ships of the Holland America Line.

== Art ==
Throughout his long career, Cobelle painted his favorite subjects; Paris street scenes, racetracks, regattas and casinos. The subjects in Cobelle's paintings were not of actual locations or events.

His paintings are characterized by thin, descriptive line-work over broad patches of bold color. First, Cobelle would map out a scene in blocks of bold, expressive color. Then, he would define the imagery with spontaneous, fluid line work. Many of his paintings were painted on canvas with mixed media - oils, acrylics, tempera, conte crayon, ink, whatever was at hand.

In 1965, a fire ravaged his studio at his home in Ridgefield, Connecticut. As a result, most of his early work was lost, as were all school records and correspondence.

In his later years he signed his paintings "Chas Cobelle."

== Exhibitions ==
In addition to his mixed media paintings, his work has also been highlighted on the covers of magazines. His murals have been featured on the walls of residences, public buildings, hotels and restaurants.

Collections:

- Hartford Antheneum
- Wm. Snaith - Pres. Raymond Lowry Assoc.
- Mr. Von Rumohr - Collector
- Hugh Leighton - Collector St. Croix, V.I.
- Mrs. Helen Hart- American Brass Co.
- Donald Deskey - Designer
- Tamanaco Hotel- Caracas, Venezuela
- Mark Hopkins Hotel- San Francisco, Calif.
- Henry End - Collector-Int. Designer
- Daniel Whitlock - Lazard Freres
- Stuart M. Seymour - American Distilling Co.
- Parke Bernet Galleries - Paintings sold in 1961, 1962, 1963
- Howard Hughes - Collector/Industrialist
- Burt Parks - Collector/Celebrity

Cobelle Exhibits:

- Niveau Galleries - Palm Beach
- Schoneman Galleries
- Lord & Taylor
- Gallery Revel - New York
- 70th St. Gallery - New York
- Park West Galleries - Michigan

Magazine and Brochure Covers:

- Cue Magazine
- This Week Magazine
- Elizabeth Arden
- Round Hill Publishing
- Emerald Beach Hotel
- Distinguished Resorts

Murals:

- Neiman Marcus Co. - Dallas, Texas
- The Royal Box - American Hotel, New York
- Painted Desert Room at the Desert Inn - Las Vegas, Nevada
- Raymond Lowry Associates
- Richs - Atlanta, Georgia
- Kenyon Hall - Michigan State University
- American Tobacco - Caracas, Venezuela
- Henry Ford Museum - Murals & Sculpture
- Norman Belle Geddes - Murals & Sculpture
- Holland American Line - Murals & Sculpture
- Cruise Ships of Wilson Line - Murals & Sculpture
- Gimbel Bros. - Philadelphia, Pa
- Teheran Restaurant - New York
- Administration Building - City of New York
- Bali-Hi-Room - Robert Meyer Hotel Jacksonville, Florida
- Estate Carlton Hotel - St. Croix, V.I.
- W.&J. Sloane for Country Club - Spring Lake, N.J.
- 200 Fifth Ave. Club - New York
- Chalfonte Haddon Hall Hotel - Atlantic City, N.J.
