= Morelli House =

Historic house in Nevada, United States

- U.S. National Register of Historic Places
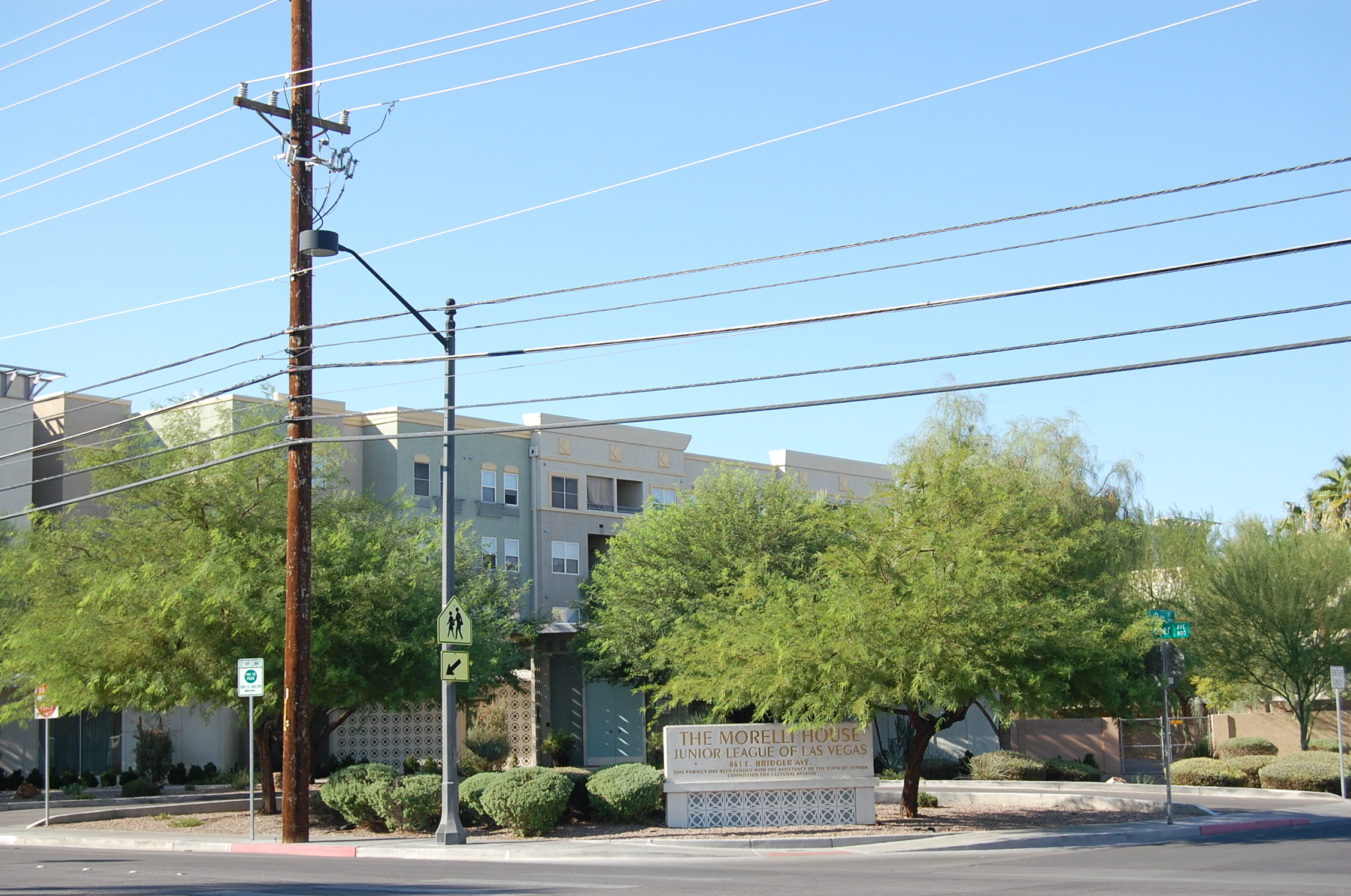

- Location within Nevada Location within the United States
- Location: 861 E. Bridger Ave., Las Vegas, Nevada
- Coordinates: 36°9′55″N 115°8′16″W
- Built: 1959
- NRHP reference No.: 11001086
- Added to NRHP: June 3, 2012

Morelli House at 861 East Bridger Avenue, Las Vegas, Nevada is listed on the city, state and National Register of Historic Places. Built in 1959, it is a classic example of mid-century modern construction.

== History ==
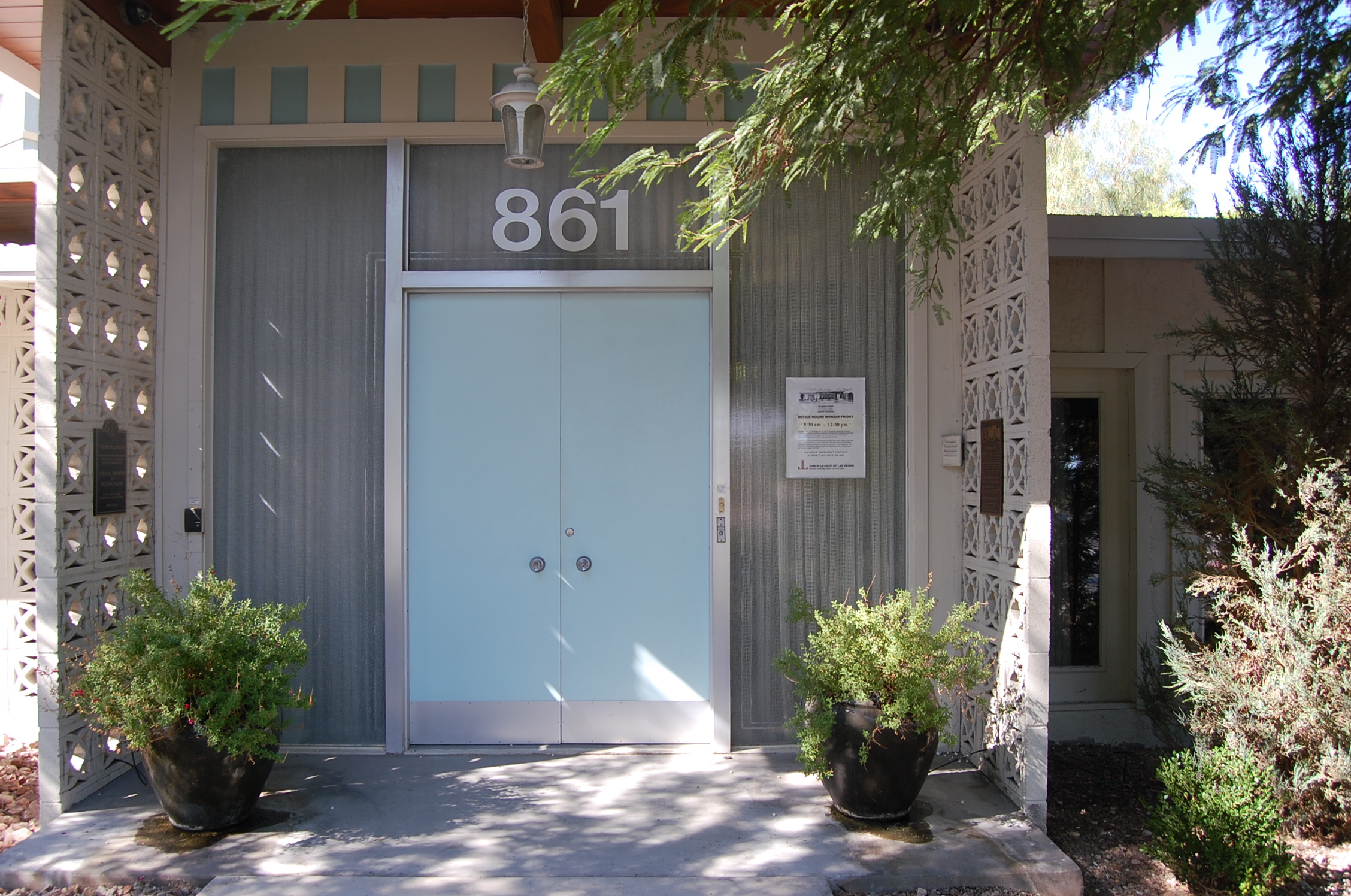
Entrance to the house

Originally located at 52 Country Club Drive, Las Vegas, Nevada, within the Desert Inn Country Club, the house was moved to 861 East Bridger Avenue in September 2001. The house is famous for being the home of Sands Hotel band leader and musical conductor Antonio Morelli and his wife Helen during the Rat Pack heyday of the 1950s and 60s. For thirty years it served as an after-hours congregating spot for some of the biggest names in entertainment including Frank Sinatra, Sammy Davis Jr., Dean Martin, Tony Bennett, Nat King Cole, Judy Garland, and many other famous names in show business. Morelli was very active in music circles in Nevada and he and his wife were also very active in various charitable causes through the years.

Designation as a landmark followed the move.
