= Tijuana Country Club =

Country club in Tijuana, Mexico

- Interactive map of Tijuana Country Club
- 32°30′40.43″N 117°0′6.41″W

Club information
- Location: Tijuana, Baja California
- Established: 1927
- Type: Semi-Private
- Tota holes: 18
- Designed by: William P. Bell
- Par: 72
- Length: 6,859 yard
- Course rating: 73.3
- Slope rating: 129

The Tijuana Country Club (Club Campestre de Tijuana) is a country club located in Tijuana, Mexico. The country club was the site of the historic Agua Caliente Open and Tijuana Open Invitational, former golf tournaments on the PGA Tour. The country club, as well as the accompanying golf course, is located in Boulevard Agua Caliente.

== History ==
The golf course was originally designed in 1927 by William P. Bell. Famous professional golf players like Gene Sarazen, Paul Runyan, Dutch Harrison, and Ernie Vossler have played at the club. Though the clientele has become increasingly Mexican over the years, it remains popular with golfers across the border in California. 34-year-old Ivan Escobosa was abducted from the club in 2005.

PGA Tour pro Cesar Sanudo was introduced to golf when he started working as a caddie at the club.

Real estate developers have put the property under redevelopment pressure, but some progress to retain urban greenspace has been made with a restoration proposal from Mexican native golf architect Agustin Pizá. Erik Anders Lang walked the property and promoted Pizá's Tijuana Country Club restoration project in his Adventures in Golf series on United Airlines.

== Course ==
Tijuana Country Club course
Tee	Rating/Slope	1	2	3	4	5	6	7	8	9	Out	10	11	12	13	14	15	16	17	18	In	Total
Black	73.3 / 129	472	231	422	358	349	192	390	397	504	3315	460	414	181	417	430	354	485	574	229	3554	6859
Blue	71.9 / 125	461	225	420	346	346	169	322	386	503	3178	431	390	170	412	426	343	476	566	224	3438	6616
White	70.2 / 120	430	177	375	290	280	127	250	318	434	2681	384	319	130	327	304	293	424	482	165	2836	5517
Gold		422	184	402	293	330	136	315	365	439	2886	377	377	157	392	353	327	424	487	191	3091	5977
Red	72.0 / 127	451	190	410	334	334	145	320	371	464	3019	399	382	158	397	353	333	439	554	199	3214	6233
SI		13	3	1	15	9	17	7	5	11		4	8	18	2	6	16	14	12	10
Par		5	3	4	4	4	3	4	4	5	36	4	4	3	4	4	4	5	5	3	36	72
