= Wirt Bowman =

American politician (1874–1949)

Wirt G. Bowman
- Born: March 28, 1874; West Point, Mississippi, United States
- Died: April 20, 1949 (aged 75); Tucson, Arizona, United States
- Resting place: Nogales, Arizona
- Occupations: Businessman, Politician
- Known for: Founding partner: Agua Caliente Casino and Hotel
- Political party: Democrat
- Board member of: First National Bank of Nogales, Arizona Brewing Company, Agua Caliente Casino and Hotel
- Spouse(s): 1) Magdalena Jesus Bernaldo; 2) Teresa Villagran

Wirt G. Bowman (March 28, 1874 – April 20, 1949) was an American self-described capitalist. He was also an entrepreneur, speculator, casino owner, and one of the founders of the Agua Caliente Casino and Hotel in Tijuana, Baja California, Mexico.

Bowman was the son of a Virginian Confederate cavalry veteran and expert telegraph operator who settled in West Point, Mississippi, following the war. In 1887, the family moved to Childress, Texas, where they engaged in farming and ranching.(citation1)

In 1894, at the age of 20, Wirt Bowman became a telegraph operator and station agent for the Southern Pacific Railway. During his 18 years with the railroad, it was said that he worked at every station between Nogales and Guaymas, except for Santa Ana. (citation 2) On June 3, 1896, he married his first wife, Magdalene Bernaldo, in Guaymas, Sonora, Mexico. They had four children, Matilda Ruth Bowman, born March 27, 1897; Edna Bowman Cavanaugh, born March 24, 1900; Georgia Bowman, born February 22, 1914, died August 14, 1918, from burns; and Betty Jean Bowman (adopted) born January 19, 1918, died, October 12, 1973, from cancer. He left the railroad in 1912 to devote his time to ranching in Nogales, Arizona, where he soon became an exceptionally successful businessman and politician. Bowman was a resident of Nogales for 51 years, and was responsible for much of its development and construction, including the Bowman Hotel and the Nogales Theater. He eventually owned the First National Bank, and was a principal investor in the Arizona Brewing Company in Phoenix, which offered Sunbru, the first bottled beer sold in Arizona when Prohibition ended. Bowman also purchased large amounts of land in Arizona and southern California, particularly several noted properties in San Diego (including Rancho de los Penasquitos and Otero Ranch).

Bowman's success in business was matched by his success in politics. In Nogales, he served three terms as a town councilman, one term as mayor, (1918–1919) and one term as a member of the Arizona state legislature (1919–1920). He was a delegate to the Democratic National Convention in New York City in 1924, served as vice-Chairman of the Democratic State Central Committee in Arizona (1924), and served as Democratic National Committeeman of Arizona (1932–1940). He was appointed Collector of Customs for the District of Arizona by President Franklin D. Roosevelt in 1943 (some say as a reward for party service) and served 2 1/2 years. (citation 7)

Bowman was also extremely successful in business ventures across the Mexican border, where he owned the Foreign Club, a Tijuana gambling establishment. In 1928, Wirt Bowman, Baron H. Long (a California hotel and nightclub owner), and James N. Crofton (in the horseracing business) formed a company ("syndicate") to build the $10 million Agua Caliente Casino and Hotel. Some sources note the fourth partner was Abelardo L. Rodriguez, Military Commander and Governor of Baja, and future President of Mexico. The luxury Resort included casino, hotel, guest bungalows, championship golf and tennis facilities, Victorian-style Turkish baths, restaurants, nightclubs, and its own airstrip. The venture was enormously successful financially and particularly popular with Hollywood stars of the day, who were able to avoid Prohibition and other limitations by crossing the border. The $2.5 million Agua Caliente racetrack, which opened in December 1929, was equally attractive because betting on horse races was illegal in California at the time. The world of casinos, gambling, and horseracing is often associated with organized crime, as well as "vice" crimes, such as prostitution. Some sources suggest that Bowman and his associates (dubbed "Border Barons" by the media) were also involved in these less legitimate enterprises in Tijuana, and imply that Bowman may have played a leadership role, thanks to his vast network of family and business associates on both sides of the border. (citation 11, 12) Bowman left Agua Caliente in 1934, just one year before Mexican President Lázaro Cárdenas outlawed gambling, closed the resort, and turned it into a school.

In 1945, Bowman sold the First National Bank, resigned as president of the local chamber of commerce, and bought one of the largest cattle ranches in southern Arizona's San Rafael Valley. (citation 2) He died of a heart attack on April 20, 1949, at the age of 75. He spent his last three years in Tucson, with his second wife, Teresa Villagran Bowman. He had three children with Teresa Bowman.

Bowman's associate Baron Long once owned a racehorse named "Wirt Bowman", which is widely regarded as the first Thoroughbred racehorse to be transported by airplane to compete in a race.
