= 1958 PGA Tour =

Golf tour season

1958 PGA Tour season
- Duration: January 3, 1958 – December 14, 1958
- Number of official events: 45
- Most wins: (United States) Ken Venturi (4)
- Money list: (United States) Arnold Palmer
- PGA Player of the Year: (United States) Dow Finsterwald

The 1958 PGA Tour was the 43rd season of the PGA Tour, the main professional golf tour in the United States.

== Schedule ==
The following table lists official events during the 1958 season.

Date	Tournament	Location	Purse (US$)	Winner (Note: The number in parentheses after each winner's name is the number of PGA Tour events they had won up to and including that tournament. This information is only shown for PGA Tour members.)	Notes
Jan 6	Los Angeles Open	California	35,000	(United States) Frank Stranahan (6)	
Jan 12	Bing Crosby National Pro-Am Golf Championship	California	50,000	(United States) Billy Casper (4)	Pro-Am
Jan 20	Tijuana Open Invitational	Mexico	20,000	(United States) Dutch Harrison (18)	
Jan 26	Thunderbird Invitational	California	15,000	(United States) Ken Venturi (3)	
Jan 29	Phoenix Open Invitational	Arizona	15,000	(United States) Ken Venturi (4)	
Feb 9	Tucson Open Invitational	Arizona	15,000	(United States) Lionel Hebert (2)	
Feb 16	Texas Open Invitational	Texas	15,000	(United States) Bill Johnston (1)	
Feb 24	Houston Open	Texas	30,000	(United States) Ed Oliver (8)	
Mar 2	Baton Rouge Open Invitational	Louisiana	15,000	(United States) Ken Venturi (5)	
Mar 11	Greater New Orleans Open Invitational	Louisiana	20,000	(United States) Billy Casper (5)	
Mar 16	Pensacola Open Invitational	Florida	15,000	(United States) Doug Ford (13)	
Mar 23	St. Petersburg Open Invitational	Florida	15,000	(United States) Arnold Palmer (8)	
Mar 30	Azalea Open Invitational	North Carolina	15,000	(United States) Howie Johnson (1)	
Apr 6	Masters Tournament	Georgia	60,000	(United States) Arnold Palmer (9)	Major championship
Apr 13	Greater Greensboro Open	North Carolina	15,000	(United States) Bob Goalby (1)	
Apr 20	Kentucky Derby Open	Kentucky	20,000	(South Africa) Gary Player (1)	
Apr 27	Tournament of Champions	Nevada	20,000	(Canada) Stan Leonard (2)	Winners-only event
Apr 27	Lafayette Open Invitational	Louisiana	15,000	(United States) Jay Hebert (9)	New tournament Alternate event
May 4	Colonial National Invitation	Texas	25,000	(United States) Tommy Bolt (12)	Invitational
May 11	Arlington Hotel Open	Arkansas	20,000	(United States) Julius Boros (6)	
May 18	Memphis Open	Tennessee	20,000	(United States) Billy Maxwell (4)	New tournament
May 25	Kansas City Open	Missouri	20,000	(United States) Ernie Vossler (1)	
Jun 1	Western Open	Michigan	25,000	(United States) Doug Sanders (2)	
Jun 8	Dallas Open Invitational	Texas	25,000	(United States) Sam Snead (72)	
Jun 14	U.S. Open	Oklahoma	35,000	(United States) Tommy Bolt (13)	Major championship
Jun 23	Buick Open Invitational	Michigan	57,000	(United States) Billy Casper (6)	New tournament
Jun 30	Pepsi Championship	New York	52,000	(United States) Arnold Palmer (10)	New tournament
Jul 4	The Open Championship	England	£4,850	(Australia) Peter Thomson (5)	Major championship (Note: Unofficial money event at the time, but retrospectively counted as an official win.)
Jul 6	Rubber City Open Invitational	Ohio	20,000	(United States) Art Wall Jr. (5)	
Jul 13	Insurance City Open Invitational	Connecticut	25,000	(United States) Jack Burke Jr. (13)	
Jul 20	PGA Championship	Pennsylvania	40,000	(United States) Dow Finsterwald (4)	Major championship
Jul 27	Eastern Open Invitational	Maryland	20,000	(United States) Art Wall Jr. (6)	
Aug 4	Gleneagles-Chicago Open Invitational	Illinois	50,000	(United States) Ken Venturi (6)	
Aug 11	Miller Open Invitational	Wisconsin	35,000	(United States) Cary Middlecoff (37)	
Aug 17	St. Paul Open Invitational	Minnesota	25,000	(United States) Mike Souchak (7)	
Aug 23	Canadian Open	Canada	25,000	(United States) Wes Ellis (1)	
Sep 1	Vancouver Open Invitational	Canada	42,000	(United States) Jim Ferree (1)	New tournament
Sep 8	Utah Open	Utah	15,000	(United States) Dow Finsterwald (5)	
Sep 14	Denver Open	Colorado	20,000	(United States) Tommy Jacobs (1)	
Sep 21	Hesperia Open Invitational	California	15,000	(United States) John McMullin (1)	
Nov 9	Carling Open Invitational	Georgia	25,000	(United States) Julius Boros (7)	
Nov 16	Havana International	Cuba	45,000	(United States) George Bayer (2)	
Nov 23	West Palm Beach Open Invitational	Florida	15,000	(United States) Pete Cooper (5)	
Nov 30	Havana Invitational	Cuba	15,000	(United States) Billy Casper (n/a)	Pro-Am (Note: Official money; unofficial win.)
Dec 14	Mayfair Inn Open	Florida	15,000	(United States) George Bayer (3)	

=== Unofficial events ===
The following events were sanctioned by the PGA Tour, but did not carry official money, nor were wins official.

Date	Tournament	Location	Purse ($)	Winner(s)	Notes
Nov 23	Canada Cup	Mexico	n/a	(Republic of Ireland) Harry Bradshaw and (Republic of Ireland) Christy O'Connor Snr	Team event
Nov 23	Canada Cup Individual Trophy	Mexico	n/a	(Spain) Ángel Miguel	

== Money list ==
The money list was based on prize money won during the season, calculated in U.S. dollars.

Position	Player	Prize money ($)
1	(United States) Arnold Palmer	42,608
2	(United States) Billy Casper	41,324
3	(United States) Ken Venturi	36,268
4	(United States) Dow Finsterwald	35,393
5	(United States) Art Wall Jr.	29,841
6	(United States) Julius Boros	29,817
7	(United States) Tommy Bolt	26,941
8	(United States) Jay Hebert	26,385
9	(United States) Bob Rosburg	25,171
10	(United States) Doug Ford	21,875

== Awards ==
Award	Winner	Ref.
PGA Player of the Year	(United States) Dow Finsterwald	
Scoring leader (Vardon Trophy)	(United States) Bob Rosburg	
