= West Palm Beach Open Invitational =

Golf tournament formerly on the PGA Tour

West Palm Beach Open
Tournament information
- Location: West Palm Beach, Florida
- Established: 1954
- Course: West Palm Beach Country Club
- Par: 71
- Tour: PGA Tour
- Format: Stroke play
- Prize fund: US$20,000
- Month played: November/December
- Final year: 1972

Tournament record score
- Aggregate: 269 Pete Cooper (1958)
- To par: −19 as above

Final champion
- (Canada) Wilf Homenuik
- Location in the United States Location in Florida

The West Palm Beach Open Invitational, first played as The West Palm Beach Open, was a PGA Tour event in the late 1950s and early 1960s. It was held at the West Palm Beach Country Club, now known as the West Palm Beach Golf Course, an 18-hole, par-72 championship course established in 1921 and in its present location in the southwestern corner of West Palm Beach, Florida since 1947.

The West Palm Beach Open was founded in 1954 as a 54-hole event with prize money of $2,000. Prize money increased to $5,000 in 1955 and $10,000 in 1956 and 1957. The 1957 event was run by the PGA. From 1958 to 1962 the tournament was a 72-hole PGA Tour event with prize money of $15,000 from 1958 to 1960 and $20,000 in 1961 and 1962. From 1963 the event returned to being a local event. The 1963 tournament was over 54 holes with a first prize of $500.

== Winners ==
Year	Tour (Note: PGAT − PGA Tour.)	Winner	Score	To par	Margin of victory	Runner(s)-up	Winner's share ($)	Ref.
West Palm Beach Open
1972		(Canada) Wilf Homenuik						
1964–1971: No tournament
1963		(United States) Jim McCoy						
West Palm Beach Open Invitational
1962	PGAT	(United States) Dave Ragan	277	−11	Playoff	(United States) Doug Sanders	2,800	
1961	PGAT	(United States) Gay Brewer	274	−14	4 strokes	(United States) Arnold Palmer	2,800	
1960	PGAT	(United States) Johnny Pott	278	−10	3 strokes	(United States) Sam Snead	2,000	
1959	PGAT	(United States) Arnold Palmer	281	−7	Playoff	(United States) Gay Brewer (United States) Pete Cooper	2,000	
1958	PGAT	(United States) Pete Cooper	269	−19	Playoff	(United States) Wes Ellis	2,000	
1957	PGAT	(Canada) Al Balding	209	−7	1 stroke	(United States) Dow Finsterwald (United States) Bert Weaver	1,200	
West Palm Beach Open
1956		(United States) Gardner Dickinson						
1955		(United States) Al Besselink						
1954		(United States) Lloyd Wadkins						
