= Pepsi Championship =

Golf tournament formerly on the PGA Tour

Tournament information
- Location: East Norwich, New York
- Established: 1958
- Course: Pine Hollow Country Club
- Par: 71
- Tour: PGA Tour
- Format: Stroke play
- Prize fund: US$52,000
- Month played: June
- Final year: 1958

Tournament record score
- Aggregate: 273 Arnold Palmer (1958)
- To par: −11 as above

Final champion
- (United States) Arnold Palmer
- Location in the United States Location in New York

The Pepsi Championship, also known as the Pepsi-Boys Club Open, was a golf tournament on the PGA Tour that was played at Pine Hollow Country Club in East Norwich, New York for a single year — 1958. The purse was the largest on the PGA Tour that year and was the first PGA Tour event ever held on Long Island.

The "Pine Hollow" course at the Pine Hollow Country Club is an 18-hole, par-71 championship course that was designed by William F. Mitchell and opened in 1958.

== Winners ==
Year	Winner	Score	To par	Margin of victory	Runner-up
1958	(United States) Arnold Palmer	273	−11	5 strokes	(United States) Jay Hebert
