= Wayne McAllister =

American architect

- Born: November 17, 1907; San Diego, California
- Died: March 22, 2000 (aged 92); Arcadia, California
- Occupation: Architect
- Buildings: Bob's Big Boy (Burbank); Sands Hotel; Fremont Hotel and Casino

Wayne Douglas McAllister (November 17, 1907 – March 22, 2000) was a Los Angeles-based architect who was a leader in the Googie style of architecture that embraced the automobile and the Space Age. Inspired by tail fins and gleaming chrome, he elevated the drive-in restaurant and the theme hotel to futuristic works of art. His 1941 El Rancho Vegas was the very first resort hotel on the Las Vegas Strip, and his iconic 1949 Bob's Big Boy restaurant in Burbank, California is a California historical landmark. He created iconic circular drive-in restaurants in Southern California, including Simon's, Herbert's, and Robert's in the 1930s.

== Biography ==
McAllister's first major commission was the Agua Caliente Casino and Hotel in 1928, a resort casino and race track that presaged his work in Las Vegas. He designed restaurants and nightclubs, including Pig 'n Whistle, Mike Lyman's, Van De Kamp's, Lawry's, Bob's Big Boy, Cinegrill in the Hollywood Roosevelt Hotel, and restaurants and nightclubs at the Millennium Biltmore Hotel including the Biltmore Bowl, home to many Academy Awards ceremonies.

After the El Rancho Vegas, McAllister created the original plans for other hotels in Las Vegas, including El Cortez, Desert Inn, Sands Hotel, and the Fremont Hotel and Casino. His partner William Wagner created Binion's Horseshoe in 1961.

His obituary in The New York Times reported that he moved to Washington, D.C. to work for Marriott in 1956, becoming a Vice President and supervising the first hotels built by Marriott. He returned to Los Angeles in 1962 where he became an entrepreneur, including the early development of coin-operated photocopying vending machines. The Los Angeles Conservancy held an exhibition on his career at the Pacific Design Center in 1998.

McAllister died of a head injury in Arcadia, California at the age of 92.

== Selected projects ==
- Agua Caliente Casino and Hotel, Tijuana, Mexico (1928)
- Herbert's Drive In, Los Angeles, California (early 1930s)
- El Rancho Vegas Hotel, Las Vegas, Nevada (1941)
- Bob's Big Boy, Burbank, California (1949)
- Desert Inn, Las Vegas, Nevada (1950)
- Sands Hotel, Las Vegas, Nevada (1952)
- Fremont Hotel & Casino, Las Vegas, Nevada (1956)
