= Agua Caliente Casino and Hotel =

Hotel and casino and hotel in Tijuana, Mexico

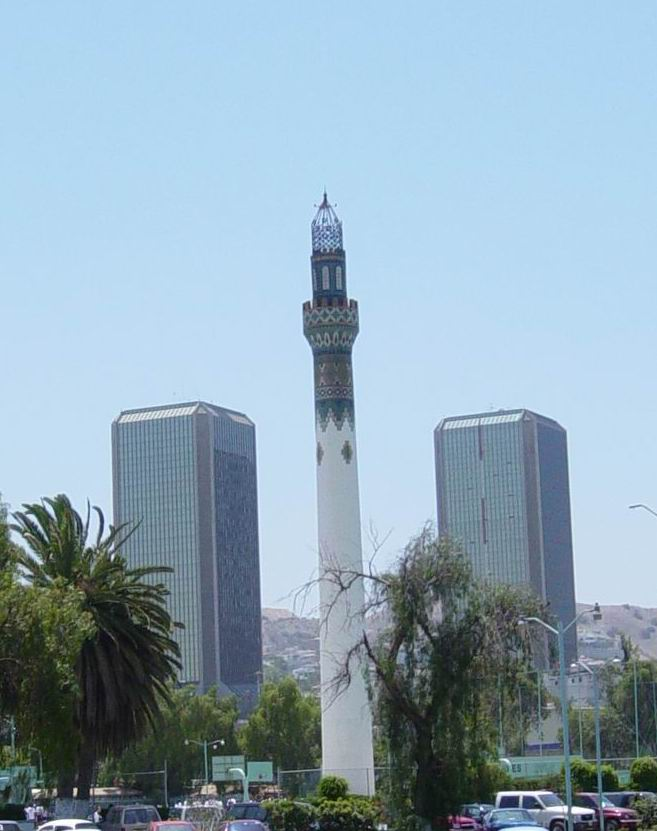
- View of the Minaret, with Las Torres at background.
- Opened: 22 June 1928 (98 years ago) in the Mexican city of Tijuana, Baja California
- Closed: 1935; 91 years ago

The Agua Caliente Casino and Hotel was a resort that operated from 1928 to 1935. Although the casino and hotel were closed, the racetrack continued to operate for many years. The original grandstand structure was destroyed by fire in 1971, but was rebuilt and continues to operate today as the Agua Caliente Racetrack and Casino, a branch of the Casino Caliente chain.

== History ==
The vast and spectacular resort opened on June 22, 1928, outside the Mexican city of Tijuana in Baja California, in what is now the Agua Caliente neighborhood. It was designed by the prominent North American architect Wayne McAllister, who was just 19 years old at the time. Stylistically, it was a blend of Mexican colonial and California mission styles, with significant neo-Moorish elements.

Gambling and horse racing were illegal in neighboring California. And alcohol was illegal throughout the US, due to Prohibition. So, many wealthy Americans and Hollywood celebrities flocked to Agua Caliente, which was just 18 miles south of San Diego International Airport. Clark Gable, Jean Harlow, Louis B. Mayer, the Marx Brothers, Marlene Dietrich, Bing Crosby, Charlie Chaplin, Gloria Swanson, and the boxer Jack Dempsey were among the regular visitors. The resort also attracted elites from around the world, including diplomats, royalty, sports stars, politicians, patricians, and nouveau-riche capitalists. Rita Hayworth was discovered there while performing in a show. The films In Caliente and The Champ were filmed on location there. And the resort also attracted gangsters. Al Capone was rumored to have been a regular visitor. And Bugsy Siegel cited Agua Caliente as his inspiration for building the Flamingo Club, on what would become the Las Vegas Strip. The great New Zealand bred Australian racehorse Phar Lap won the Agua Caliente Handicap in 1932, earning the richest purse in the world at the time. The American thoroughbred champion Seabiscuit won the same race in 1938.

The first stage of the resort was completed in June 1928. It consisted of a 500-room hotel, casino, health spa with Turkish steam bath, minaret tower, and café. The second stage was completed at the end of December 1929. It consisted of an Olympic-size swimming pool, health clinics, 18-hole golf course, putting course, horse racing track, greyhound race track, gardens & tropical aviary, guest bungalows, laundry, and workshop areas. The resort also had its own private radio station and airport facility. The highlight of the opulent casino was the Gold Room, where patrons could only bet using gold chips, with a rumored $500 minimum wager. One Los Angeles Times reporter concluded in 1929 that "there isn't another place on the continent, outside of a U.S. Mint, where you can see so much money piled up before your eyes at one time. Its only rival in the world is Monte Carlo."

The entire Agua Caliente resort cost approximately $10 million to build, which was a huge sum of money for that era. It was built by the Agua Caliente Company, which was formed by North American investors Baron H. Long, Wirt G. Bowman and James N. Crofton. The fourth partner was General Abelardo L. Rodríguez, who was acting Military Commander and Governor of Baja California. Rodríguez would later serve as President of Mexico (1932-1934). Rodríguez owned the land upon which the resort was built. The Agua Caliente Company gave the contract for the construction of the resort to Fernando L. Rodríguez, who was Governor Rodríguez's brother and one of Baron H. Long's business associates. According to Satan's Playground author Paul Vanderwood, Rodríguez used taxpayer money to construct and outfit the enterprise.

Mexican President Lázaro Cárdenas outlawed gambling in 1935 and closed the resort. It became a state-run school, Escuela Preparatoria Federal Lázaro Cárdenas and eventually fell into disrepair. Although most of the original buildings are gone, remnants remain. The blue-tiled minaret has been preserved, and sits on the west side of the grounds near the Plaza Minarete shopping mall. The interior shell of the Spa Building was also preserved, and the Olympic-size swimming pool in the courtyard was restored in the late 2000s. It's now called the Alberca de Agua Caliente (PFLC). Near the pool are the remains of the Fuente Fauno (Faun Fountain). The original guest bungalows are still standing, on the east side of the former complex. The 18-hole golf course is now the Country Club of Tijuana. And a replica of the iconic bell tower (which once stood at the resort entrance) now stands at the beginning of Boulevard Agua Caliente, about two miles west of the old resort.

== Bibliography ==
- Beltran, David Jimenez. The Agua Caliente Story: Remembering Mexico's Legendary Racetrack (2004) Eclipse Press ISBN 1-58150-115-3
- Chris Nichols. The Leisure Architecture of Wayne McAllister (Layton, Utah: Gibbs Smith) 2007

== See also ==
- In Caliente
