= Ernie Vossler =

American professional golfer (1928–2013)

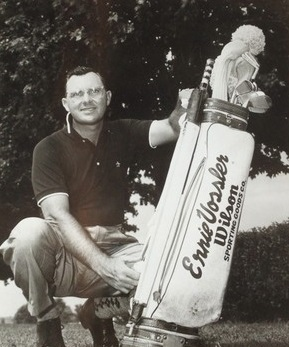
- Vossler in the 1950s

Personal information
- Full name: Ernest Orville Vossler
- Nationality: United States
- Born: November 29, 1928 Fort Worth, Texas, U.S.
- Died: February 16, 2013 (aged 84) La Quinta, California, U.S.
- Height: 5 ft 11 in (1.80 m)
- Weight: 175 lb (79 kg; 12.5 st)
- Spouse: Marlene Hagge

Career
- Sport: Golf
- Turned professional: 1954
- Former tour: PGA Tour
- Professional wins: 4

Number of wins by tour
- PGA Tour: 3
- Other: 1

Best results in major championships
- Masters Tournament: 38th: 1956
- PGA Championship: T15: 1961
- U.S. Open: T5: 1959
- The Open Championship: DNP

Ernest Orville Vossler (November 29, 1928 – February 16, 2013) was an American professional golfer who played on the PGA Tour; he later prospered in the fields of golf course design and construction, golf course management services and real estate development.

== Early life ==
Vossler was born and raised in Fort Worth, Texas, where he played on the Paschal High School golf team.

== Professional career ==
In 1954, Vossler turned professional. He began play on the PGA Tour in 1955. His best finish in a major championship was T-5 at the 1959 U.S. Open.

As his full-time touring days were winding down, Vossler became a club pro and worked at Southern Hills Country Club in Tulsa, Oklahoma and later Quail Creek Golf & Country Club in Oklahoma City. He was named "PGA Golf Professional of the Year" in 1967.

Vossler later became involved in a series of businesses relating to golf course development starting in 1971. Some of his business partners include former tour players Joe Walser, Jr. and Johnny Pott. In 1974, Vossler and Walser founded the Oak Tree Golf Club, now known as Oak Tree National, which has hosted the 1988 PGA Championship and is scheduled to host the 2014 U.S. Senior Open. He was the Chairman of Landmark Golf, a golf/real estate development firm serving the southwestern United States.

== Personal life ==
Vossler was married to World Golf Hall of Famer Marlene Hagge. He died in La Quinta, California in 2013.

== Awards and honors ==
Vossler was inducted into the PGA Golf Professional Hall of Fame in 2005.

== Professional wins (4) ==
=== PGA Tour wins (3) ===
No.	Date	Tournament	Winning score	Margin of victory	Runner-up
1	May 25, 1958	Kansas City Open	−19 (67-65-70-67=269)	2 strokes	(United States) Billy Maxwell
2	Jan 12, 1959	Tijuana Open Invitational	−15 (69-65-71-68=273)	2 strokes	(United States) John McMullin
3	Sep 18, 1960	Carling Open Invitational	−12 (69-69-66-68=272)	1 stroke	(United States) Paul Harney

=== Other wins (1) ===
- 1960 Panama Open
