= Agua Caliente Open =

Golf tournament formerly on the PGA Tour

Tijuana Open Invitational
Tournament information
- Location: Tijuana, Mexico
- Established: 1956
- Course: Tijuana Country Club
- Par: 72
- Length: 7,400 yards (6,800 m)
- Tour: PGA Tour
- Format: Stroke play
- Prize fund: US$20,000
- Month played: January
- Final year: 1959

Tournament record score
- Aggregate: 273 Ernie Vossler (1959)
- To par: −15 as above

Final champion
- (United States) Ernie Vossler
- Location in Mexico

The Agua Caliente Open was a golf tournament on the PGA Tour first played in 1930 in Tijuana, Mexico. The inaugural event, which was won by Gene Sarazen, offered the largest purse to date — $25,000 with a $10,000 winner's share. The tournament had a second incarnation briefly in the 1950s with the last two events played under the name Tijuana Open Invitational.

== Winners ==
Year	Winner	Score	To par	Margin of victory	Runner(s)-up	Winner's share ($)	Ref.
Tijuana Open Invitational
1959	(United States) Ernie Vossler	273	−15	2 strokes	(United States) John McMullin	2,800	
1958	(United States) Dutch Harrison	280	−8	1 stroke	(United States) Jerry Barber (United States) Fred Hawkins (United States) Arnold Palmer (United States) Bo Wininger	2,000	
Agua Caliente Open
1957	(United States) Ed Furgol	280	−8	Playoff (Note: Furgol won with a par on the second hole of a sudden death playoff.)	(United States) Al Besselink	2,000	
1956	(United States) Mike Souchak	281	−7	2 strokes	(United States) Tommy Bolt	2,200	
1936–1955: No tournament
1935	(United States) Henry Picard	286	+2	2 strokes	(United States) Harry Cooper (United States) Willie Goggin	1,000	
1934	(United States) Wiffy Cox	282	−2	1 stroke	(United States) Willie Hunter	1,500	
1933	(United States) Paul Runyan	287	−1	2 strokes	(United States) Horton Smith	1,500	
1932	(United States) Fred Morrison	284	−4	2 strokes	(United States) Gene Sarazen	5,000	
1931	(United States) Johnny Golden	293	+5	Playoff (Note: Golden won following an 18-hole playoff; Golden 75, Von Elm 79)	(United States) George Von Elm	10,000	
1930	(United States) Gene Sarazen	295	+11	2 strokes	(United States) Al Espinosa (United States) Horton Smith	10,000	
