= Al Besselink =

American professional golfer (1923–2017)

Personal information
- Full name: Albert Cornelius Besselink
- Nickname: Bessie
- Nationality: United States
- Born: June 10, 1923 Merchantville, New Jersey, U.S.
- Died: April 10, 2017 (aged 93) Florida, U.S.
- Height: 6 ft 3 in (1.91 m)
- Weight: 220 lb (100 kg; 16 st)
- Spouse: Jo Ann Stillwagon

Career
- Sport: Golf
- College: University of Miami
- Turned professional: 1949
- Former tours: PGA Tour; Champions Tour
- Professional wins: 18

Number of wins by tour
- PGA Tour: 4
- Other: 14

Best results in major championships
- Masters Tournament: T3: 1952
- PGA Championship: T33: 1956, 1957, 1964
- U.S. Open: T6: 1951
- The Open Championship: DNP

Albert Cornelius Besselink (June 10, 1923 – April 10, 2017) was an American professional golfer who played on the PGA Tour in the 1950s and 1960s.

== Early life ==
Besselink grew up in Merchantville, New Jersey.

He attended the University of Miami and was the first UM golfer to win a national tournament. He won the Southern Intercollegiate Championship twice before graduating in 1949.

== Professional career ==
In 1949, shortly after graduating college, Besselink turned professional.

Besselink won four PGA Tour events including the inaugural Tournament of Champions in 1953. The field was made up of 20 professionals, all tournament winners in the prior twelve months. With a six-foot par putt on the 18th hole, he finished with a 280, beating Chandler Harper by one stroke. Besselink was paid off with a wheelbarrow filled with silver dollars. He also had bet $500 on himself at 25-1, earning another $12,500. Because he had just heard that Babe Zaharias had been diagnosed with cancer he donated half of his $10,000 first prize to the Damon Runyon Cancer Fund. Besselink and Zaharias had won the International Two-Ball Championship at Orlando in February 1952.

Besselink was called "Bessie" by the other tour players and was known for living life with a gambler's recklessness and a showman's flair. One famous example of his showmanship occurred during the third round of the 1965 Colonial National Invitation in Fort Worth when Besselink played the final four holes of his third round with a red rose—plucked from a bush at the 15th hole—between his teeth. Afterward, Besselink said the gesture was a nod to the "loveliness of Texas women in general and Fort Worth women in particular." The next day, locker room attendants presented Besselink with 50 roses sent by female fans.

== Personal life ==
Besselink was married to Jo Ann.

In 2016, it was reported that Besselink, then aged 93, was living in a nursing home in South Florida. He was by then using a wheelchair and suffering from severe memory loss. Besselink died in Florida on April 10, 2017, at the age of 93.

== Amateur wins ==
- 1948 Southern Intercollegiate Championship
- 1949 Southern Intercollegiate Championship

== Professional wins (18) ==
=== PGA Tour wins (4) ===
No.	Date	Tournament	Winning score	Margin of victory	Runner(s)-up
1	Jul 27, 1952	Sioux City Open	−22 (65-70-67-64=266)	4 strokes	(United States) Jerry Barber
2	Apr 26, 1953	Tournament of Champions	−8 (72-68-68-72=280)	1 stroke	(United States) Chandler Harper
3	May 26, 1957	Kansas City Open	−9 (70-67-67-75=279)	3 strokes	(United States) George Bayer, (United States) Dow Finsterwald
4	Mar 30, 1964	Azalea Open	−6 (70-65-72-75=282)	1 stroke	(United States) Lionel Hebert

PGA Tour playoff record (0–1)

No.	Year	Tournament	Opponent	Result
1	1957	Agua Caliente Open	(United States) Ed Furgol	Lost to par on second extra hole

=== Other American wins (8) ===
- 1946 Azalea Open (as an amateur)
- 1952 International Mixed Two-Ball Open (with Babe Zaharias),
- 1955 West Palm Beach Open
- 1960 Philadelphia PGA Championship
- 1961 Pennsylvania Open Championship
- 1963 Philadelphia Open Championship
- 1966 Philadelphia Open Championship
- 1969 Philadelphia PGA Championship

=== Caribbean Tour wins (2) ===
- 1965 Caracas Open (Feb), Caracas Open (Nov)

=== Other Latin American wins (4) ===
- 1952 Colombian Open, Barranquilla Open (Colombia)
- 1956 Havana Invitational
- 1957 Venezuela Open

== Results in major championships ==
Tournament	1950	1951	1952	1953	1954	1955	1956	1957	1958	1959
Masters Tournament		T20	T3	9	T9	T63				
U.S. Open	T12	T6	CUT	CUT	WD	CUT			CUT	
PGA Championship							R64	R64	CUT	

Tournament	1960	1961	1962	1963	1964	1965	1966	1967	1968	1969	1970
Masters Tournament											
U.S. Open						CUT	CUT			CUT	
PGA Championship	T39	63	CUT		T33			CUT			CUT

Note: Besselink never played in The Open Championship.

Top 10
Did not play

WD = withdrew
R64, R32, R16, QF, SF = round in which player lost in PGA Championship match play
"T" indicates a tie for a place

=== Summary ===
Tournament	Wins	2nd	3rd	Top-5	Top-10	Top-25	Events	Cuts made
Masters Tournament	0	0	1	1	3	4	5	5
U.S. Open	0	0	0	0	1	2	10	2
The Open Championship	0	0	0	0	0	0	0	0
PGA Championship	0	0	0	0	0	0	9	5
Totals	0	0	1	1	4	6	24	12

- Most consecutive cuts made – 4 (1950 U.S. Open – 1952 Masters)
- Longest streak of top-10s – 1 (four times)
