= Desert Inn =

Historic resort in Las Vegas, Nevada

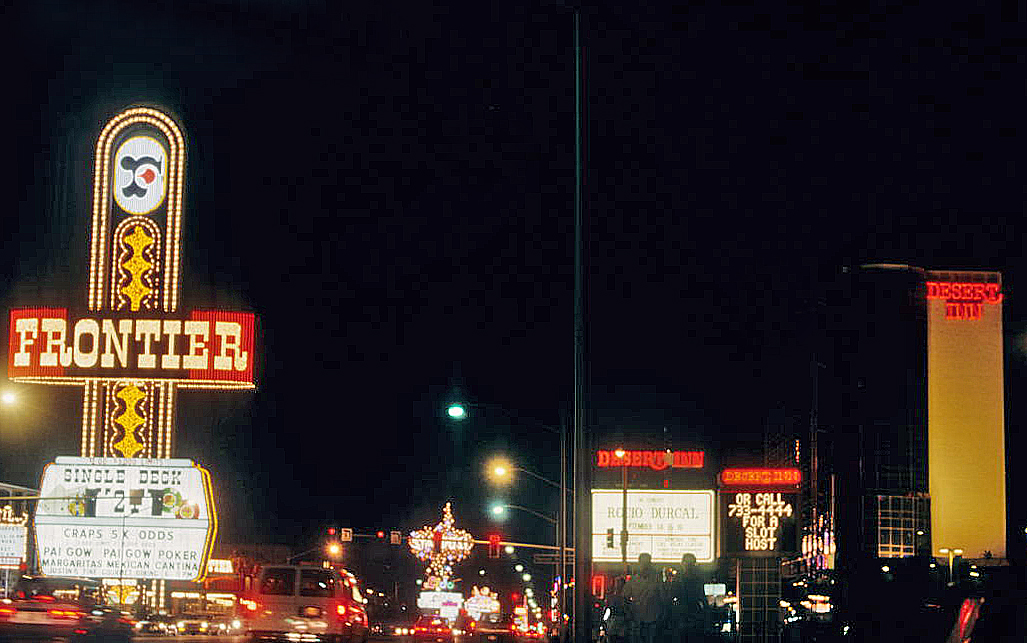
- The Desert Inn in 1989.
- Interactive map of Desert Inn Hotel and Casino
- Location: Paradise, Nevada, U.S.; 3145 South Las Vegas Blvd; 36°07′43″N 115°9′59″W
- Opened: April 24, 1950
- Closed: August 28, 2000; 26 years ago
- Theme: Desert
- No. of rooms: 715
- Gaming space: 35,000 sq ft (3,300 m^{2})
- Signature attractions: Desert Inn Golf Course
- Casino type: Land
- Owner: 1964–1967 Moe Dalitz; 1967–1988 Howard Hughes; 1988–1993 Kirk Kerkorian; 1993–1998 ITT / Sheraton Hotels and Resorts; 1998–2000 Starwood; 2000 Steve Wynn
- Architect: Hugh E. Taylor (1950); William B. Tabler (1963); John Spohrer (1978)
- Previous names: Wilbur Clark's Desert Inn, Sheraton Desert Inn

The Desert Inn, also known as the D.I., was a casino hotel on the Las Vegas Strip in Paradise, Nevada, which operated from April 24, 1950, to August 28, 2000. Designed by architect Hugh Taylor and interior design by Jac Lessman, it was the fifth resort to open on the Strip, the first four being El Rancho Vegas, The New Frontier, Flamingo, and the El Rancho (then known as the Thunderbird). It was situated between Desert Inn Road and Sands Avenue.

The Desert Inn opened with 300 rooms and the Sky Room restaurant, headed by a chef formerly of the Ritz Paris, which once had the highest vantage point on the Las Vegas Strip. The casino, at 2,400 square feet (220 m^{2}), was one of the largest in Nevada at the time. The nine-story St. Andrews Tower was completed during the first renovation in 1963, and the 14-story Augusta Tower became the Desert Inn's main tower when it was completed in 1978 along with the seven-story Wimbledon Tower. The Palms Tower was completed in 1997 with the second and final renovation. The Desert Inn was the first hotel in Las Vegas to feature a fountain at the entrance. In 1997, the Desert Inn underwent a $200 million renovation and expansion, but after it was purchased for $270 million by Steve Wynn in 2000, he decided to demolish it and build the Wynn Las Vegas resort and casino where the Desert Inn once stood, and later, Encore. The remaining towers of the Desert Inn were imploded in 2004.

The original performance venue at the Desert Inn was the Painted Desert Room, later the Crystal Room, which opened in 1950 with 450 seats. Frank Sinatra made his Las Vegas debut there on September 13, 1951, and became a regular performer. The property included an 18-hole golf course which hosted the PGA Tour Tournament of Champions from 1953 to 1966. The golf course remained in place and is now a part of the Wynn resort.

== History ==
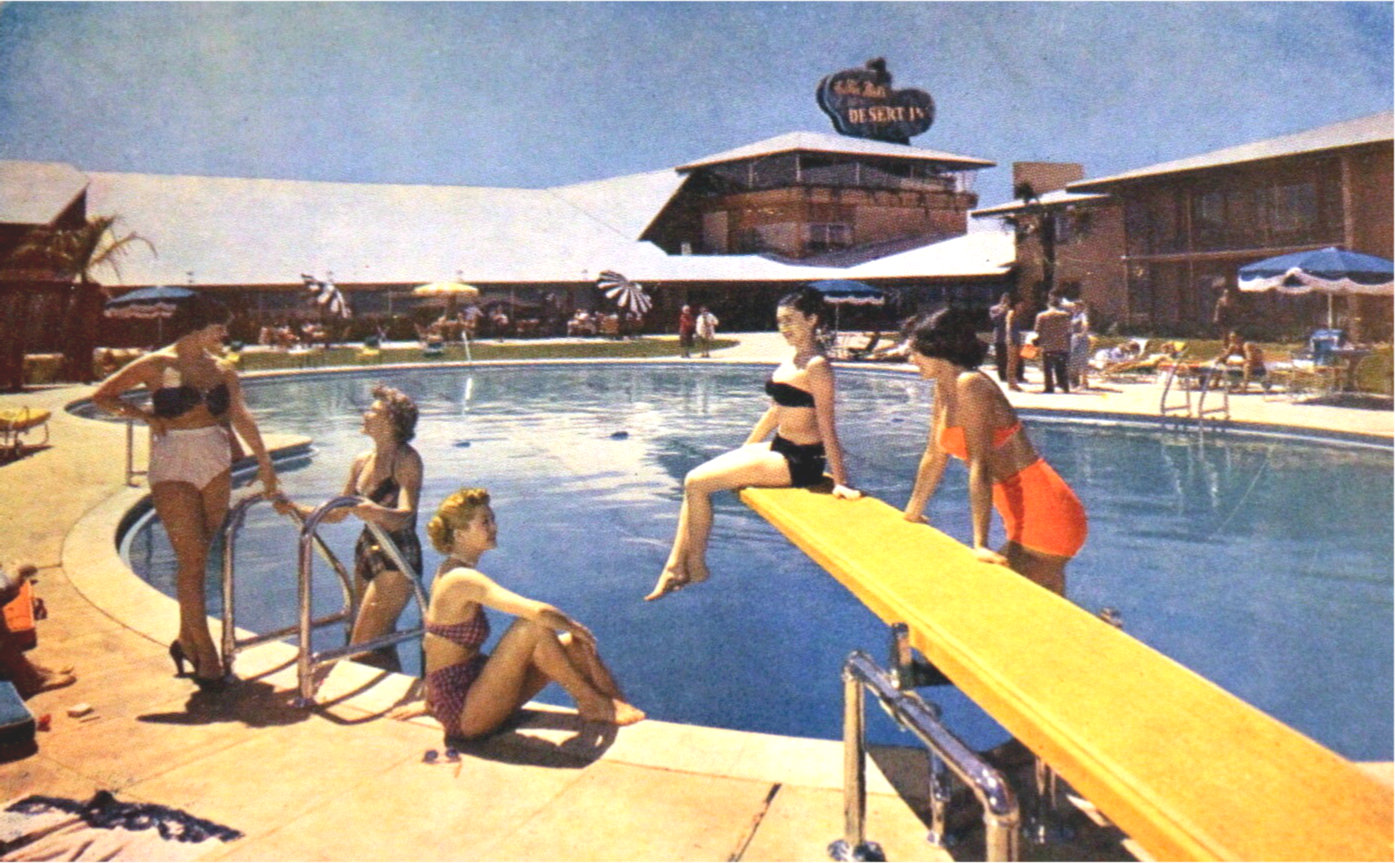
Young women at the hotel pool in 1955

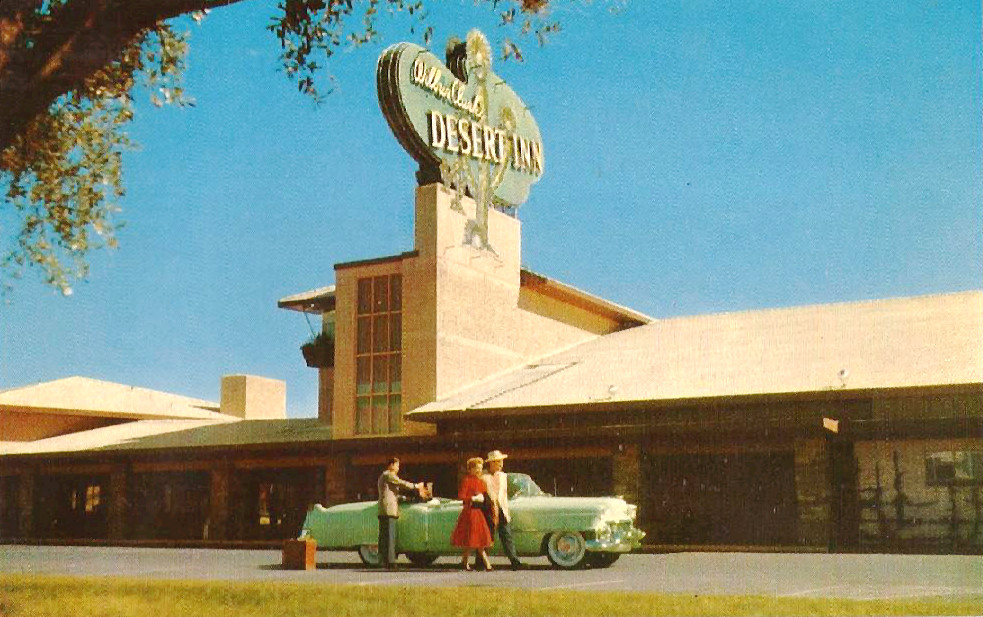
The hotel in 1956

The hotel was situated at 3145 Las Vegas Boulevard South, between Desert Inn Road and Sands Avenue. The original name was Wilbur Clark's Desert Inn. Wilbur Clark, described by Frank Sinatra biographer James Kaplan as a "onetime San Diego bellhop and Reno craps dealer", originally began building the resort with his brother in 1947 with $250,000, but ran out of money. Author Hal Rothman notes that "for nearly two years the framed structure sat in the hot desert sun, looking more like an ancient relic than a nascent casino". Clark approached the Reconstruction Finance Corporation for investment, but it was struggling financially. In 1949, he met with Moe Dalitz, the head of the notorious Cleveland Syndicate, which had ties to the Mayfield Road Mob, and Dalitz agreed to fund 75% of the project with $1.3 million, and construction resumed. Much of the financing came from the American National Insurance Company (ANICO), though Clark became the public frontman of the resort while Dalitz remained quietly in the background as the principal owner. The resort would eventually be renamed Desert Inn and was called the "D.I." by Las Vegas locals and regular guests.

The Desert Inn opened formally on April 24, 1950, at a two-day gala which was heavily publicized nationally. Journalists from all of the major newspapers and magazines were invited, and the hotel paid $5,700 to cover air tickets. 150 invitations were sent out by Clark to VIPs with a credit limit of $10,000. About half the attendees at the opening were from California and Nevada. At the opening show in the Painted Desert Room were performers such as Edgar Bergen and Charlie McCarthy, Vivian Blaine, Pat Patrick, The Donn Arden Dancers, Van Heflin, Abbott and Costello, and the Desert Inn Orchestra, led by Ray Noble. In attendance were a number of mafiosi, including Black Bill Tocco, Joe Massei, Sam Maceo, Peter Licavoli, and Frank Malone in a gala which Barbara Greenspun believed marked the beginning of heavy involvement of the mafia in the development of Las Vegas. Sidney Korshak was one of its early investors.

The Desert Inn became known for its "opulence" and top-notch service. The first manager of the Desert Inn had previously worked as the manager at the Clift Hotel in San Francisco. Lew and Edie Wasserman were frequent guests of the hotel. During the 1950s, the hotel often hosted the Duke and Duchess of Windsor, Winston Churchill, Adlai Stevenson, Senator John F. Kennedy, and former President Harry S. Truman.

In the mid 1940s and early 1950s the city and its Chamber of Commerce worked to keep the Vegas nickname of the "Atomic City" going to attract tourists. After the Desert Inn opened, so called "bomb parties" famously took place in the hotel's panoramic Sky Room, where patrons could view the detonations from a relatively safe distance while drinking Atomic Cocktails.

In 1959, Lawrence Wien, owner of New York City's Plaza Hotel purchased the hotel, but signed a management deal for Clark to remain as manager. In the early 1960s, the mafia-financed casino hotels of the Las Vegas Strip and Nevada came under close scrutiny by the FBI, and they placed increased pressure on the Nevada Gaming Control Board to force the mobsters out of Las Vegas. After Sam Giancana was spotted on the premises of Frank Sinatra's Cal Neva Lodge & Casino at Lake Tahoe, his gambling license was removed by the Board and he was forced to sell up and forfeit his share in the Sands Hotel and Casino. The Desert Inn faced similar scrutiny by the FBI, attracting controversy at the same time for the involvement of Dalitz and his mobster associates, but simultaneously called for the prosecution of the FBI for illegal wiretapping. In 1964, Clark sold his remaining share in the hotel to Dalitz and business associates Morris Kleinman, Thomas McGinty and Sam Tucker. He died of a heart attack the following year. The bell captain of the Desert Inn, Jack Butler, remembered Clark: "Wilbur was the greatest guy. Without him this town never would've got off the ground. Everyone came into the club just to see him and he was all over the postcards. He was the only boss who would agree to have his picture taken".

The Desert Inn's most famous guest, businessman Howard Hughes, arrived on Thanksgiving Day 1966, renting the hotel's entire top two floors. After staying past his initial ten-day reservation, he was asked to leave in December so that the resort could accommodate the high rollers who were expected for New Year's Eve. Instead of leaving, Hughes started negotiations to buy the Desert Inn. On March 27, 1967, Hughes purchased the resort from Dalitz for $6.2 million in cash and $7 million in loans. This was the first of many Las Vegas resort purchases by Hughes, including the Sands Hotel and Casino ($14.6 million) and the Frontier Hotel and Casino ($23 million). However, Hughes refused to include the PGA Tour Tournament of Champions in the deal, so Dalitz moved the tournament to his Stardust Resort and Casino in 1967 and 1968.

The reclusive Hughes continued to live in his penthouse suite at the Desert Inn for four years, never leaving his 250 square feet (23 m^{2}) bedroom. Usually unclothed, he spent his time "negotiating purchases and business deals with the curtains drawn and windows and doors sealed shut with tape", and did not allow anyone from the hotel staff to come in and clean his room. On the eve of Thanksgiving 1970, he was removed from his room on a stretcher and flown to the Bahamas. After Hughes's death in 1976, the hotel remained under the Summa Corporation, which completed the extensive renovation that he had ordered. Summa sold the hotel to Kirk Kerkorian and the Tracinda Corporation in 1986, and it became known as the MGM Desert Inn.

In 1992, Frank Sinatra celebrated his 77th birthday at the hotel in an event that generated much media attention. Dick Taylor, the CEO of public relations firm Rogers & Cowan recalled: "We had the stars assemble in the casino's presidential suite and then took them in limos to the entrance of the hotel, where the press and hundreds of fans were gathered, like a Hollywood movie premiere. The stars were interviewed on the red carpet and in they went to the famed Crystal Room. It was a very big deal."

=== Modern history ===
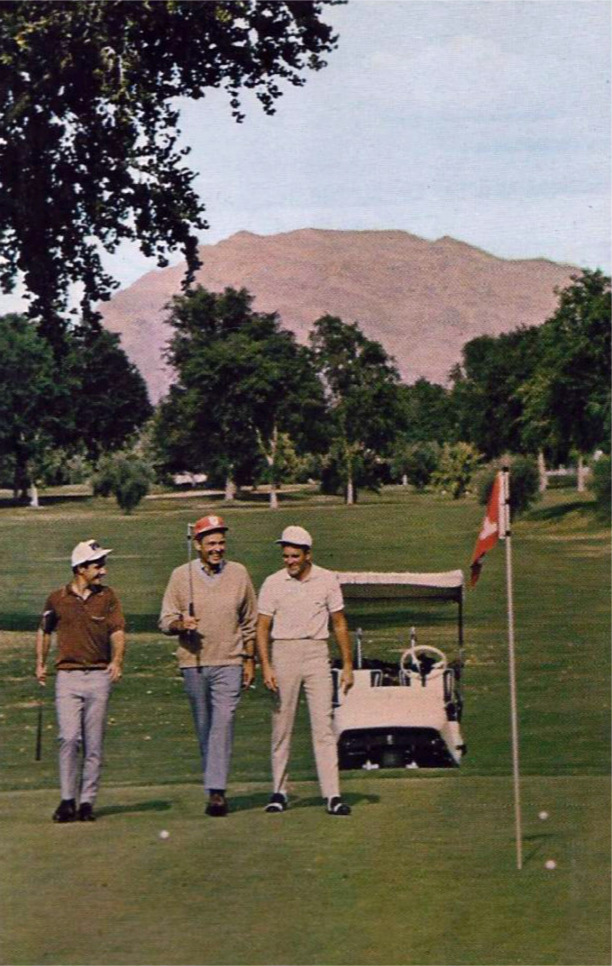
The golf course, which was retained with the opening of Wynn Las Vegas

Kerkorian sold the resort to ITT Sheraton in 1993 for $160 million and it was renamed the Sheraton Desert Inn. In May 1994, ITT Sheraton announced plans to build the Sheraton Desert Kingdom, a $750 million, 3,500-room megaresort on the property, adjacent to the existing Sheraton Desert Inn. When ITT Sheraton bought Caesars World in December 1994, plans for the new resort were shelved. In 1997, ITT Sheraton undertook a $200 million renovation of the Augusta Tower and St. Andrews Tower and expansion, with the building and completion of the Palms Tower. The resort was returned to its historic name, The Desert Inn, dropping the Sheraton name, and was placed in the ITT Sheraton Luxury Collection division. ITT Sheraton itself was sold the following year to Starwood.

Due to losing money, Starwood immediately put The Desert Inn up for sale, and contracted a sale to Sun International Hotels Ltd. on May 19, 1999, for $275 million. The sale to Sun International fell through the following March, however. Also in 1999, Sinatra's and the Rat Pack's estate managers, Sheffield Enterprises Inc., sued the Desert Inn, claiming an infringement of rights in their use of Sinatra's name and persona in its advertising and sales, including the words "Frank", "Ol' Blue Eyes", "the chairman of the Board" and "The Rat Pack". Sinatra's estate specifically objected to their use in "billboard advertising, marquees, alcoholic beverages and wine menus, and on the front and back of tee-shirts and caps at its gift shop" and alleged photographs of Sinatra and his signature on the walls behind the bar near the entrance to the Starlight Lounge of the Desert Inn.

The Desert Inn celebrated its 50th anniversary on April 24, 2000. Celebrations were held for a week and a celebrity golf tournament was held with the likes of Robert Loggia, Chris O'Donnell, Robert Urich, Susan Anton, Vincent Van Patten and Tony Curtis. As part of the festivities, a time capsule was buried in a granite burial chamber on April 25, to be reopened on April 25, 2050. Three days later, on April 27, Steve Wynn purchased the resort from Starwood for $270 million. Wynn closed the Desert Inn at 2:00 a.m. on August 28, 2000.

"Long time residents were stunned. They had endured the loss of the Dunes, the Sands, the Aladdin, the Landmark and the Hacienda but the loss of the Desert Inn seemed to hit many of them on more personal level. Perhaps it was that the Desert Inn had been the favored place for locals to go to for dancing and dining. Perhaps it was all the myth surrounding Wilbur Clark, Moe Dalitz and Howard Hughes. Or maybe it was that long time residents were beginning to realize that their town was forever changing and would never again be that small, wonderful Entertainment Capital of the World where you could see Sinatra and the Rat Pack or Elvis for dinner and drinks."

— Wilbur Clark's Desert Inn Hotel History

On October 23, 2001, the Augusta Tower, the Desert Inn's southernmost building, was imploded to make room for a mega-resort that Wynn planned to build. Coming a month after the September 11 attacks, the implosion was marked with less fanfare than previous Las Vegas demolition spectacles due to its similarity to the collapse of the Twin Towers. Originally intended to be named Le Rêve, the new project opened as Wynn Las Vegas. The remaining two towers, the St. Andrews Tower and Palms Tower were both temporarily used as the Wynn Gallery, spanning 1,316 square feet (122.3 m^{2}) to display some of Wynn's art collection. The St. Andrews Tower and Palms Tower were finally imploded on November 16, 2004.

== Architecture and features ==
The initial hotel, a $6.5 million property set in 200 acres, was designed by Hugh Taylor who was hired after Wilbur Clark and Wayne McAllister could not agree on the design. Interiors were by noted New York architect Jac Lessman. The property conveyed the image of a "southwestern spa" that was "half ranch house, half nightclub". It was built of "cinder blocks but trimmed with sandstone and finished throughout the inside with redwood". The logo of the hotel was a Joshua tree cactus. The driveway into the hotel passed under an "old-fashioned ranch sign" bearing the name Wilbur Clark's Desert Inn in scripted letters. The Desert Inn was the first hotel in Las Vegas to feature a fountain at the entrance. A "Dancing Waters" show involved the fountain jets choreographed to music.

The interior of the hotel was finished in redwood with flagstone flooring. The public space included a registration area, a casino, two bars, a coffee shop, a restaurant, various commercial shops and services, and a broadcasting station for K-RAM radio. Guest rooms were located in wings situated behind the main building, surrounding the figure-eight swimming pool. The hotel originally had 300 rooms, each outfitted with air conditioning with individual thermostats.

The lounge was located in a three-story, glass-sided tower at the front of the hotel known as the Sky Room, which was the largest structure on the Strip at the time of its construction and commanded views of the mountains and desert all around, as well as overlooked the "Dancing Waters" feature. The Sky Room restaurant was headed by a chef formerly of the Ritz Paris.

The original performance venue at the Desert Inn was the 450 seat Painted Desert Room, later the Crystal Room, which opened in 1950 with 450 seats. Charles Cobelle created the handpainted murals, and a "band car" was used to move the orchestra within the showroom. Next door was a restaurant, the Cactus Room. The Kachina Doll Ranch was a supervised play area for guests' children. The hotel had a ladies salon and health club from the outset. Another performance venue at the hotel was the Lady Luck Lounge.

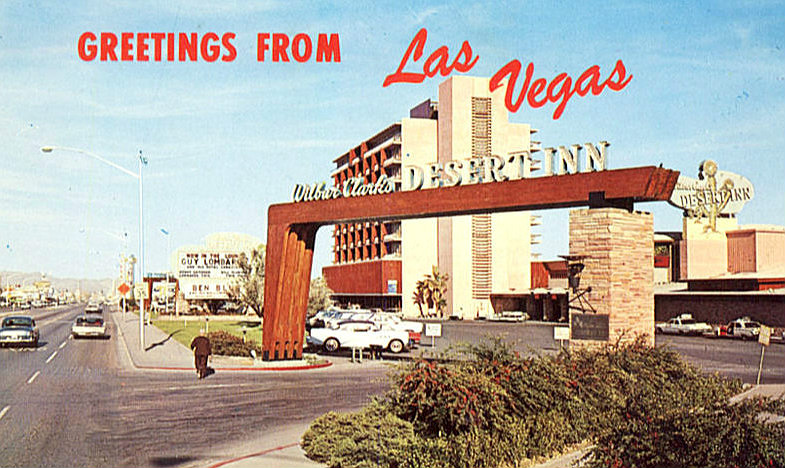
The hotel in 1970

The hotel had its first addition when in 1963 the St. Andrews Tower was built. The tower was designed by William B. Tabler. A near-identical tower by Tabler was built concurrently at the Stardust, which was under common ownership. In the 1970s, the hotel underwent a $54-million renovation under Howard Hughes, which resumed under the responsibility of the Summa Corporation after his death in 1976. The 14-story Augusta Tower became the Desert Inn's main tower when it was completed in 1978. The seven-story Wimbledon Tower contained duplex suites, and resembled a modern version of a Mayan pyramid. It overlooked the golf course and was built at the same time, bringing the total room count to 825. By 1978, most of the 1950s structures on the property had been replaced with modern buildings and the property was renamed the Desert Inn and Country Club. It featured full country club amenities open to guests of the hotel, including a club house, driving range, pro shop, restaurant and lounge at the golf club; 10 tournament-class outdoor tennis courts; and a 18,000 feet (5,500 m) spa. Three restaurants were added: the "small, intimate" Monte Carlo Room, the "gourmet" Portofino Room, and the Ho Wan Chinese restaurant. At the time of its sale to ITT-Sheraton in 1993, the Desert Inn had the largest frontage of any casino hotel on the Las Vegas Strip, measuring 1,700 feet (520 m) feet.

In 1997, the Desert Inn underwent a $200 million renovation and expansion by Steelman Partners, giving it a new Mediterranean-looking exterior with white stucco and red clay tile roofs. The room count was reduced to 715 to provide more luxurious accommodations. The nine-story Palm Tower was completed, the lagoon-style pool was added, and notable changes were made to the Grand Lobby Atrium, Starlight Lounge, Villas Del Lago, and new golf shop and country club. The seven-story lobby, fully built in marble, was also a major part of the renovation.

=== Casino ===
At its opening in 1950, the casino, at 2,400 square feet (220 m^{2}), was one of the largest in Nevada at the time. The windowless room included "five crap tables, three roulette wheels, four black jack tables and 75 slot machines", together with a sportsbook. Hundreds of coin-operated gambling machines – including slot machines, video poker, 21, and keno – were installed during the 1978 renovation. The casino acquired a reputation for attracting the high rollers. On January 27, 2000, the Megabucks jackpot record for Las Vegas was broken when $34,955,489 was won by an anonymous gambler at the Desert Inn, playing a bank of six Megabucks machines near the hotel's coffee shop.

=== Golf course and country club ===
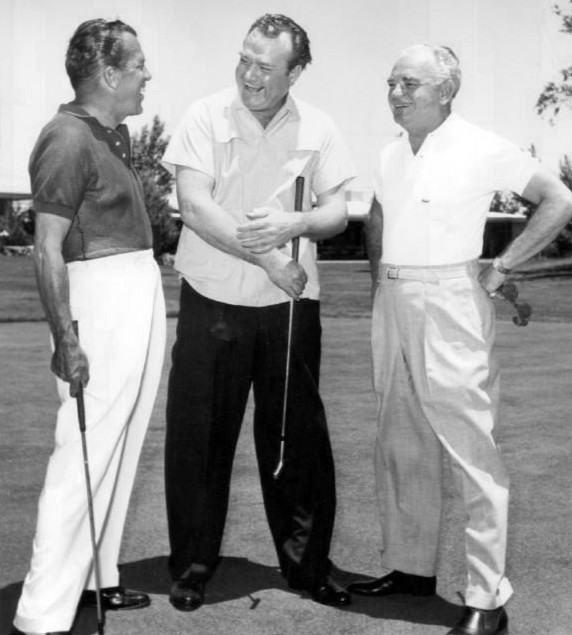
(L. to r.) Ed Sullivan, Red Skelton and Wilbur Clark playing golf at the hotel in June 1959

The 18-hole, par-72 Desert Inn Golf Club opened in 1952. Initially, Dalitz had pushed the idea of opening a golf course next to the hotel with an entrance off the Strip, which would be accessible to other hotels and boost the city's profile as a resort destination. When other hotel owners rejected this idea, Dalitz built the course on the hotel premises. He also opened an outdoor dining area, to accommodate golfers and swimmers who might prefer a more informal atmosphere. The course hosted the PGA Tour Tournament of Champions from 1953 to 1966, attracting professional golfers such as Sam Snead, Arnold Palmer, and Jack Nicklaus. Allard Roen was director of the tournament for many years and was instrumental in breaking down the race barrier on the Strip. He broke the all-white club convention by permitting Sammy Davis, Jr. to play on the course. From 1958 it hosted the Golf Cup Golf Tournament, the largest tournament in the world for amateur golfers.

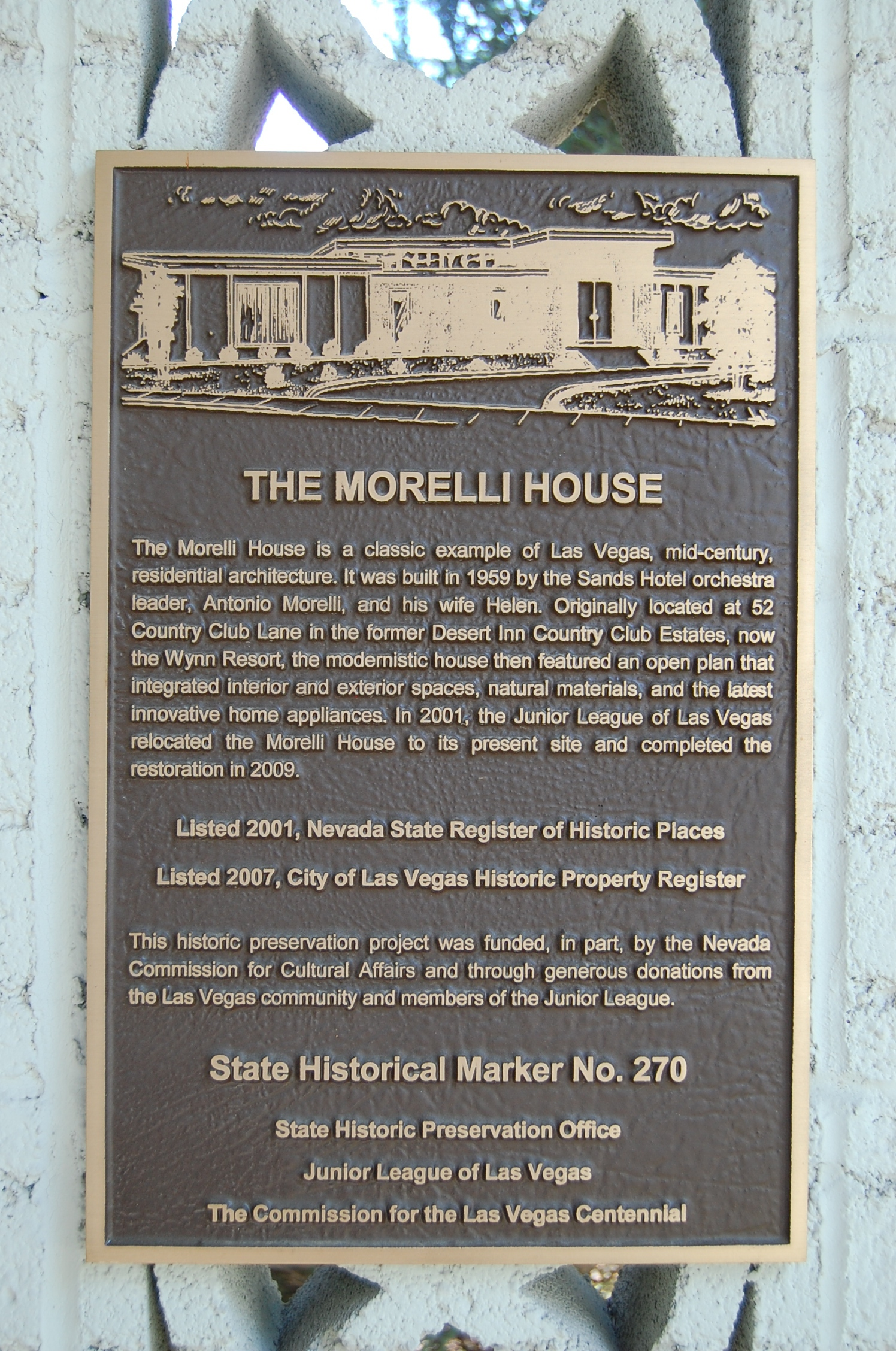
State Historical Marker in front of the relocated Morelli House

According to the Las Vegas Sun, the course "held the distinction of being the only golf course in the United States to have annually hosted three championship tour events – the PGA Tour's Las Vegas Invitational, the Las Vegas Senior Classic and the LPGA Las Vegas International". The Panasonic Las Vegas Invitational, now the Las Vegas Invitational, returned to the Desert Inn in 1983, and became known as the wealthiest PGA event in the world. It has since been won by the likes of Fuzzy Zoeller, Curtis Strange, Greg Norman, and Paul Azinger. The Las Vegas Senior Classic event at the Desert Inn was added to the Senior PGA Tour in 1986 and has since been won by Bruce Crampton (1986), Al Geiberger, who equaled the course record at the time of 62 (1987), Larry Mowry (1988) and Lee Trevino (1992).

Wilbur Clark was the first to build a home on the golf course in the 1950s. Additional homes were added to the Desert Inn Country Club Estates from the 1960s on. During his ownership of the hotel, Howard Hughes built 100 residential units on the property. After Steve Wynn purchased the resort in 2000 and announced that the real estate was too valuable to leave as a golf course, homeowners were forced to sell their properties to Wynn and his property developer Irwin Molasky. Molasky bought homes closest to the golf course for $2 million each, and homes on the perimeter of the resort for $900,000 to $1.2 million each. The Junior League of Las Vegas convinced Wynn to save one house from demolition and moved it to a lot in downtown Las Vegas to serve as its headquarters. This was the Morelli House, designed by architect Hugh Taylor for Antonio Morelli, a "rare example of modernist architecture in Las Vegas". The house was subsequently listed on the City and State historic registers.

== Performances ==
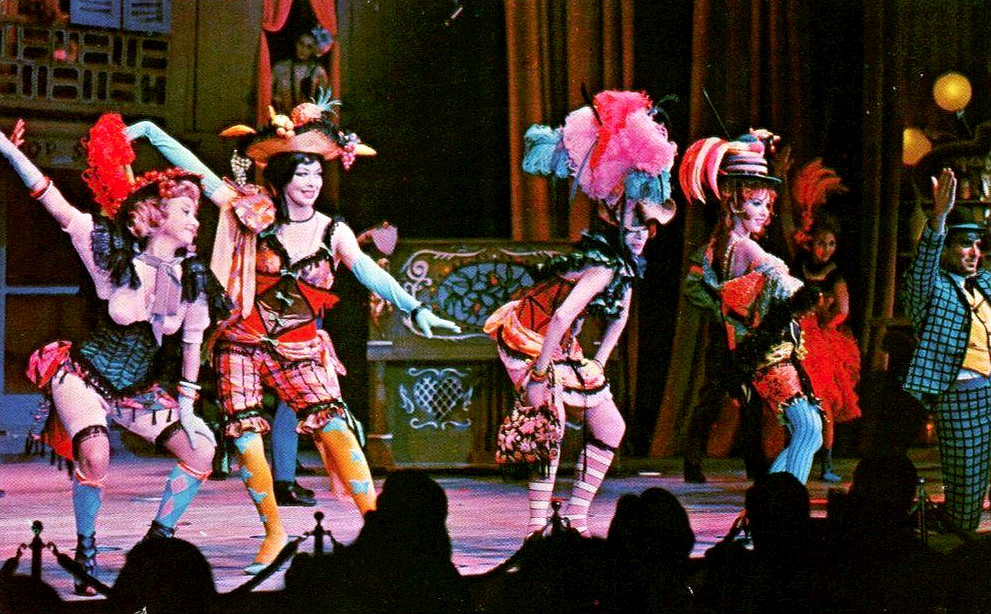
The Hello America Revue in the Crystal Room of the Desert Inn, 1967

Almost every major star of the latter half of the 20th century played at the Desert Inn. Frank Sinatra made his Las Vegas debut at the Desert Inn on September 13, 1951. He later said of it: "Wilbur Clark gave me my first job in Las Vegas. That was in 1951. For six bucks you got a filet mignon dinner and me". Noël Coward performed at the Inn on one occasion for an entire month. In 1954, after a performance at the Desert Inn, Betty Hutton announced one of her several retirements. In 1958, Tony Martin was signed to a five-year deal at $25,000 per week, making him the highest paid performer in Las Vegas. Eddie Fisher was heckled by a disguised Elizabeth Taylor during a 1961 performance, in a year which saw Dinah Shore booked for her fourth performance and debut Vegas performances at the Desert Inn by both Benny Goodman and Rosemary Clooney. In 1979, Jet magazine noted that Wayne Newton was "enthroned" at the Desert Inn as king of entertainment idols", earning $10 million a year, which made him the highest-paid nightclub performer of all time. Other performers in its famous "crystal showroom" over the years included Patti Page, Ted Lewis, Joe E. Lewis, Bobby Darin, Jimmy Durante, Tony Bennett, Paul Anka, Dionne Warwick, Louise Mandrell, and more.

Louis Prima and Keely Smith recorded their 1960 Dot Records LP On Stage live at the Desert Inn. Bobby Darin's famous album Live! At the Desert Inn was recorded at the hotel in February 1971. In 1992, a week-long celebration of Frank Sinatra's 77th birthday at the Desert Inn was held and later in January it was announced that Sinatra, Liza Minnelli, Paul Anka, Shirley MacLaine, Dean Martin, Steve Lawrence and Eydie Gorme had all signed a two-year engagement agreeing to perform at least five weeks annually.

== Film and television ==
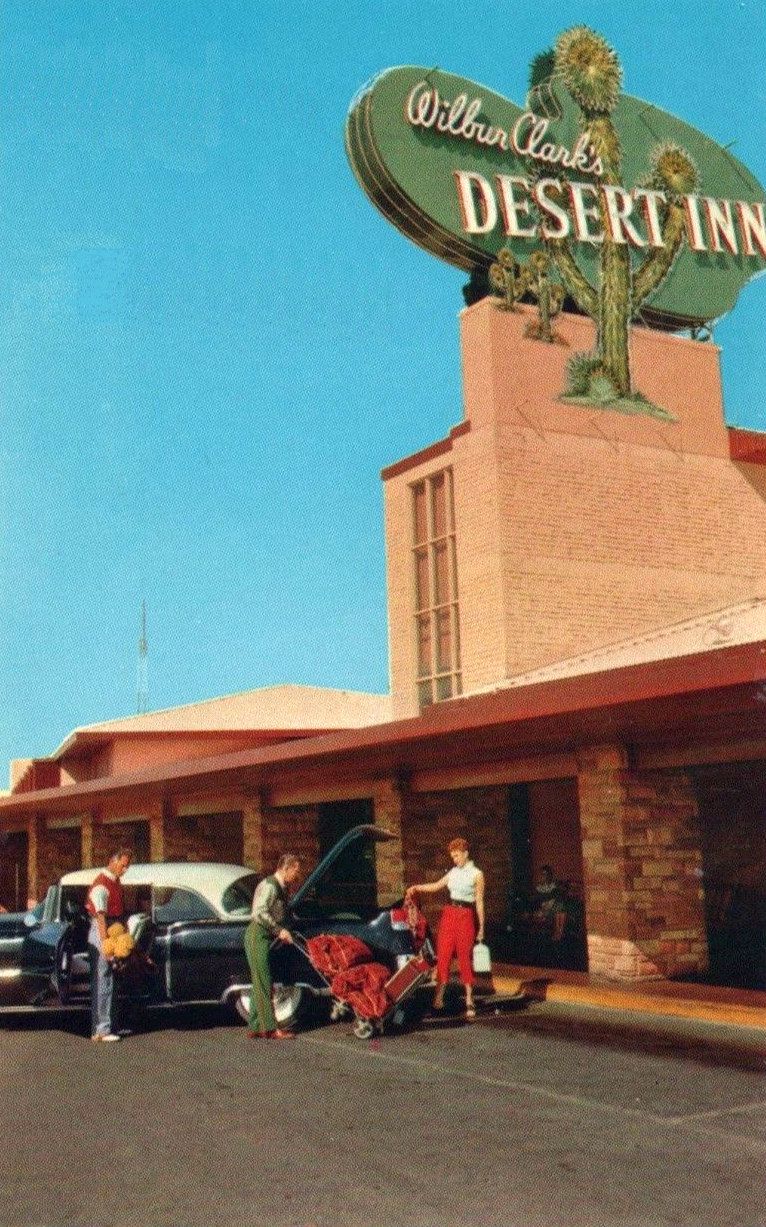
Classic image of Wilbur Clark's Desert Inn, 1955

Portions of Ocean's 11 were shot at the Desert Inn. It is one of the five Las Vegas hotels robbed on New Year's Eve by the characters played by Frank Sinatra, Dean Martin and others in the film. Orson Welles' film F for Fake covers, among other topics, the scandal of a fake biography of Howard Hughes, and the billionaire's Desert Inn residence is illustrated by Welles. In the 1985 film Lost in America, Julie Hagerty's character Linda Howard loses the couple's "nest egg" at the Desert Inn, leading to a memorable scene in which Albert Brooks' character David Howard tries to convince the Casino manager (Garry Marshall) to give them their money back. David, an ad man, proposes a campaign centered around the generosity of the casino in his case, replete with a jingle: "The Desert Inn has heart... The Desert Inn has heart." The opening scene to the 1993 film Sister Act 2: Back in the Habit took place in the Grand Ballroom of the hotel. The Desert Inn saw its last commercial use in the 2001 film Rush Hour 2, shortly before it was imploded. It was converted into the "Red Dragon", an Asian-themed casino set.

The hotel served as the primary backdrop for the TV show Vega$ which aired on ABC from 1978 to 1981. The 1980s Aaron Spelling soap opera Dynasty included footage of the hotel, and use of the Presidential Suite. The hit 1980s NBC TV series Remington Steele filmed its 60th Las Vegas-set episode at the inn, where both the exterior and interior are shown regularly throughout the episode.

== Legacy ==
The closure of the Desert Inn in 2000 and subsequent demolition was unpopular with many as it seemed to mark the end of old Las Vegas. Historian Michael Green stated: "To a lot of people outside of Las Vegas, these two places (the Desert Inn and the Sands) really meant Las Vegas. These were the places that represent the images of Las Vegas, in a far greater way than the Dunes, the Aladdin, the Hacienda and the Landmark". Robert Maheu, Howard Hughes's head of Nevada operations and publicist for many years, remarked that the "Desert Inn was the gem of Las Vegas". The hotel remained popular with locals until the end, as the heavily tourism-driven modern Las Vegas emerged in the 1990s.

== Desert Inn Road ==
Desert Inn Road is a 17¼ mile west–east road part of the Las Vegas Valley grid road system. It travels through residential, commercial, and industrial areas and exists as a major thoroughfare in the area. At the Las Vegas Strip exists a 2½ mile expressway portion of the road officially called the Desert Inn Road Super Arterial that acts an arterial road between Winchester and Paradise. The expressway opened in 1996 and had a construction cost of US$84 million.
