= Pete Cooper (golfer) =

American golfer

Personal information
- Full name: Richard Burnice Cooper
- Nationality: United States
- Born: December 31, 1914
- Died: October 8, 1993 (aged 78)

Career
- Sport: Golf
- Turned professional: 1938
- Former tours: PGA Tour; Champions Tour
- Professional wins: 23

Number of wins by tour
- PGA Tour: 4
- Other: 18 (regular); 1 (senior)

Best results in major championships
- Masters Tournament: T12: 1956
- PGA Championship: T9: 1953
- U.S. Open: T4: 1953
- The Open Championship: CUT: 1976

Richard Burnice "Pete" Cooper (December 31, 1914 – October 8, 1993) was an American professional golfer. Cooper played on the PGA Tour in the 1940s and 1950s; he was best known for winning the 1976 PGA Seniors' Championship.

== Professional career ==
In 1938, Cooper turned professional. In the ten-year span between 1949 and 1958, he won five official PGA Tour events and had runner-up finishes in the 1950 Houston Open and the 1955 Tournament of Champions. His best finish in a major was T4 at the 1953 U.S. Open. He helped a young Chi-Chi Rodríguez improve enough to secure a spot on the PGA Tour.

Cooper won the 1976 PGA Seniors' Championship at the age of 61 with a four-day total of 283 over runner-up Fred Wampler. The tournament was held at Walt Disney World in Orlando, Florida.

He was also active in golf course design.

== Personal life ==
Cooper lived in Lakeland, Florida, where he owned the Par 3 and Lone Palm Golf Club.

== Professional wins (23) ==
=== PGA Tour wins (4) ===
No.	Date	Tournament	Winning score	Margin of victory	Runner(s)-up
1	Mar 6, 1949	St. Petersburg Open	−9 (68-67-69-71=275)	1 stroke	(United States) Cary Middlecoff
3	Jun 13, 1954	Virginia Beach Open	−13 (67-64-64-68=263)	1 stroke	(United States) Tommy Bolt
4	Mar 17, 1957	St. Petersburg Open	−15 (68-68-68-65=269)	4 strokes	(United States) Jack Burke Jr.
5	Nov 23, 1958	West Palm Beach Open Invitational	−19 (68-63-68-70=269)	Playoff	(United States) Wes Ellis

PGA Tour playoff record (1–1)

No.	Year	Tournament	Opponent(s)	Result
1	1958	West Palm Beach Open Invitational	(United States) Wes Ellis	Won with birdie on first extra hole
2	1959	West Palm Beach Open Invitational	(United States) Gay Brewer, (United States) Arnold Palmer	Palmer won with par on fourth extra hole

=== Latin American and Caribbean wins (6) ===
- 1959 Panama Open, Puerto Rico Open, Colombian Open
- 1960 Jamaica Open, Maracaibo Open
- 1961 Panama Open

=== Other regular wins (12) ===
this list is probably incomplete

- 1944 Florida Open
- 1946 Florida Open
- 1948 Florida Open
- 1949 Florida Open
- 1950 Florida Open, Miami International Four-Ball (with Claude Harmon)
- 1953 Metropolitan Open
- 1954 Orlando Two-ball (with Patty Berg)
- 1956 Michigan Open
- 1957 Florida Open
- 1958 Florida Open
- 1966 Florida Open

=== Senior wins (1) ===
- 1976 PGA Seniors' Championship

== Team appearances ==
- Canada Cup (representing Puerto Rico): 1961
