= 1968 Masters Tournament =

- Front cover of the 1968 Masters Guide

Tournament information
- Dates: April 11–14, 1968
- Location: Augusta, Georgia; 33.503°N 82.020°W
- Course: Augusta National Golf Club
- Organized by: Augusta National Golf Club
- Tour: PGA Tour

Statistics
- Par: 72
- Length: 6,980 yards (6,383 m)
- Field: 74 players, 52 after cut
- Cut: 149 (+5)
- Winner's share: $20,000

Champion
- (United States) Bob Goalby
- 277 (−11)
- Location in the United States Location in Georgia

The 1968 Masters Tournament was the 32nd Masters Tournament, held April 11–14 at Augusta National Golf Club in Augusta, Georgia.

Bob Goalby won his only major championship, one stroke ahead of Roberto De Vicenzo, the reigning British Open champion. On the back nine in the final round, Goalby birdied 13 and 14 and eagled 15 to record a 66 (−6) and a total of 277 (−11).

At first it appeared that he had tied De Vicenzo and the two would meet in an 18-hole Monday playoff, but De Vicenzo returned an incorrect scorecard showing a par 4 on the 17th hole, instead of a birdie 3, sunk with a two-foot putt. Playing partner Tommy Aaron incorrectly marked the 4 and De Vicenzo failed to catch the mistake and signed the scorecard. USGA rules stated that the higher written score signed by a golfer on his card must stand, and the error gave Goalby the championship.

Speaking to the press after the error, De Vincenzo said, "What a stupid I am."

Ironically, Goalby discovered a scoring error he had made on the card he was keeping for Raymond Floyd, his playing partner in the final round, which he corrected at the scorer's table (there was not a scoring tent in 1968; after DeVicenzo's mistake in 1968, however, a scoring tent was erected directly behind the 18th green for the 1969 tournament). He had marked Floyd down for a par-3 on the 16th hole, when Floyd had actually bogeyed the hole. Floyd ended up in a tie for seventh place with, among others, Aaron. Both Aaron and Floyd would win the Masters in future years, Aaron in 1973 and Floyd in 1976.

Jack Nicklaus tied for fifth place and third-round leader Gary Player finished tied for seventh. Lee Trevino, 28, made his Masters debut and was two strokes back after three rounds, tied for seventh place. A rough back nine of 43 (+7) pushed his score to 80 and he finished tied for 40th. Two months later, he won the 1968 U.S. Open, the first of his six major titles. The Masters was the only major that eluded him; his best finish was a tie for tenth, in 1975 and 1985. Citing incompatibility, Trevino skipped Augusta three times in the early 1970s, and missed in 1977 due to a bad back.

In his fourteenth Masters at age 38, four-time champion Arnold Palmer found the water three times during a second round 79 for 151 and missed the cut for the first time at Augusta. He made the next seven cuts, through 1975.

Bob Rosburg won the ninth Par 3 contest on Wednesday with a score of 22. Claude Harmon, 51, had consecutive aces at the fourth and fifth holes, but tied for third at 24. The next day, Harmon withdrew in the first round after a nine-hole score of 40.

== Course ==
Hole	Name	Yards	Par	Hole	Name	Yards	Par
1	White Pine	400	4	10	Camellia	470	4
2	Woodbine	555	5	11	Dogwood	445	4
3	Flowering Peach	355	4	12	Golden Bell	155	3
4	Palm	220	3	13	Azalea	475	5
5	Magnolia	450	4	14	Chinese Fir	420	4
6	Juniper	190	3	15	Firethorn	520	5
7	Pampas	365	4	16	Redbud	190	3
8	Yellow Jasmine	530	5	17	Nandina	400	4
9	Carolina Cherry	420	4	18	Holly	420	4
Out		3,485	36	In		3,495	36
Source:				Total		6,980	72

^ Holes 1, 2, 4, and 11 were later renamed.

== Field ==
1. Masters champions

Gay Brewer (8,11), Jack Burke Jr., Doug Ford, Ralph Guldahl, Claude Harmon, Herman Keiser, Cary Middlecoff, Jack Nicklaus (2,3,4,9,10), Arnold Palmer (8,9,11), Henry Picard, Gary Player (2,8,9), Sam Snead (8), Art Wall Jr. (9)

- Jimmy Demaret, Ben Hogan (8), Byron Nelson, Gene Sarazen, and Craig Wood did not play.

The following categories only apply to Americans

2. U.S. Open champions (last five years)

Julius Boros (8,10,11), Billy Casper (8,9,11), Ken Venturi (8)

3. The Open champions (last five years)

4. PGA champions (last five years)

Al Geiberger (10,11), Don January (9,10), Dave Marr (8,9), Bobby Nichols (8,11)

5. The first eight finishers in the 1967 U.S. Amateur

Vinny Giles (a), William C. Campbell (7,a), Downing Gray (7,a), Doug Olson (a)

- Ron Cerrudo (7), Bob Dickson (6,7), Marty Fleckman (7), and Bob Murphy (7) forfeited their exemptions by turning professional.

6. Previous two U.S. Amateur and Amateur champions

7. Members of the 1967 U.S. Walker Cup team

Jack Lewis Jr. (a), Ed Tutwiler (a)

- Don Allen (a) declined his invitation because of the birth of his first child. Jimmy Grant forfeited his exemption by turning professional.

8. Top 24 players and ties from the 1967 Masters Tournament

Tommy Aaron, George Archer, Jacky Cupit, Wes Ellis (9), Paul Harney, Jay Hebert, Lionel Hebert, Bob Rosburg, Mason Rudolph, Doug Sanders (11), Bert Yancey

9. Top 16 players and ties from the 1967 U.S. Open

Deane Beman, Gardner Dickinson (11), Bob Goalby (10), Dutch Harrison, Jerry Pittman, Lee Trevino, Tom Weiskopf

10. Top eight players and ties from 1967 PGA Championship

Frank Beard, Don Bies, Gene Littler (11), Don Massengale, Dan Sikes

11. Members of the U.S. 1967 Ryder Cup team

Johnny Pott

12. One player, either amateur or professional, not already qualified, selected by a ballot of ex-Masters champions.

Tommy Jacobs

13. Leading six players, not already qualified, from a points list based on finishes in PGA Tour events since the previous Masters

Miller Barber, Charles Coody, Raymond Floyd, Dave Hill, R. H. Sikes, Kermit Zarley

14. Foreign invitations

Al Balding (9), Peter Butler (8), Joe Carr (a), Bob Charles (3), Chen Ching-Po, Clive Clark, Gary Cowan (6,a), Roberto De Vicenzo (3,8), Bruce Devlin (8), Malcolm Gregson, Harold Henning, Tommy Horton, Tony Jacklin (8), George Knudson, Kel Nagle (9), Hideyo Sugimoto, Raul Travieso

- Numbers in brackets indicate categories that the player would have qualified under had they been American.

== Round summaries ==
=== First round ===
Thursday, April 11, 1968

Place	Player	Score	To par
1	(United States) Billy Casper	68	−4
T2	(United States) Tommy Aaron	69	−3
T2	(Argentina) Roberto De Vicenzo	69	−3
T2	(Australia) Bruce Devlin	69	−3
T2	(England) Tony Jacklin	69	−3
T2	(United States) Jack Nicklaus	69	−3
T7	(United States) Bob Goalby	70	−2
T7	(United States) Jerry Pittman	70	−2
T7	(United States) Kermit Zarley	70	−2
T10	(United States) Raymond Floyd	71	−1
T10	(United States) Vinny Giles (a)	71	−1
T10	(United States) Don January	71	−1
T10	(United States) Herman Keiser	71	−1
T10	(Japan) Hideyo Sugimoto	71	−1
T10	(United States) Lee Trevino	71	−1
T10	(United States) Bert Yancey	71	−1

=== Second round ===
Friday, April 12, 1968

Place	Player	Score	To par
T1	(United States) Don January	71-68=139	−5
T1	(South Africa) Gary Player	72-67=139	−5
T3	(United States) Frank Beard	75-65=140	−4
T3	(United States) Bob Goalby	70-70=140	−4
T3	(United States) Jack Nicklaus	69-71=140	−4
6	(United States) Tommy Aaron	69-72=141	−3
T7	(Argentina) Roberto De Vicenzo	69-73=142	−2
T7	(Australia) Bruce Devlin	69-73=142	−2
T7	(United States) Raymond Floyd	71-71=142	−2
T7	(England) Tony Jacklin	69-73=142	−2
T7	(United States) Bert Yancey	71-71=142	−2

=== Third round ===
Saturday, April 13, 1968

Place	Player	Score	To par
1	(South Africa) Gary Player	72-67-71=210	−6
T2	(United States) Frank Beard	75-65-71=211	−5
T2	(United States) Raymond Floyd	71-71-69=211	−5
T2	(Australia) Bruce Devlin	69-73-69=211	−5
T2	(United States) Bob Goalby	70-70-71=211	−5
T2	(United States) Don January	71-68-72=211	−5
T7	(United States) Miller Barber	75-69-68=212	−4
T7	(Argentina) Roberto De Vicenzo	69-73-70=212	−4
T7	(United States) Lee Trevino	71-72-69=212	−4
T10	(United States) Tommy Aaron	69-72-72=213	−3
T10	(United States) Jerry Pittman	70-73-70=213	−3

=== Final round ===
Sunday, April 14, 1968

==== Final leaderboard ====
Champion
Silver Cup winner (low amateur)
(a) = amateur
(c) = past champion

Top 10
Place	Player	Score	To par	Money (US$)
1	(United States) Bob Goalby	70-70-71-66=277	−11	20,000
2	(Argentina) Roberto De Vicenzo	69-73-70-66=278	−10	15,000
3	(United States) Bert Yancey	71-71-72-65=279	−9	10,000
4	(Australia) Bruce Devlin	69-73-69-69=280	−8	7,500
T5	(United States) Frank Beard	75-65-71-70=281	−7	5,500
T5	(United States) Jack Nicklaus (c)	69-71-74-67=281	−7	5,500
T7	(United States) Tommy Aaron	69-72-72-69=282	−6	3,460
T7	(United States) Raymond Floyd	71-71-69-71=282	−6	3,460
T7	(United States) Lionel Hebert	72-71-71-68=282	−6	3,460
T7	(United States) Jerry Pittman	70-73-70-69=282	−6	3,460
T7	(South Africa) Gary Player (c)	72-67-71-72=282	−6	3,460

Leaderboard below the top 10
Place	Player	Score	To par	Money ($)
T12	(United States) Miller Barber	75-69-68-71=283	−5	2,850
T12	(United States) Doug Sanders	76-69-70-68=283	−5	2,850
T14	(United States) Don January	71-68-72-73=284	−4	2,650
T14	(United States) Mason Rudolph	73-73-72-66=284	−4	2,650
T16	(United States) Julius Boros	73-71-70-71=285	−3	2,400
T16	(United States) Billy Casper	68-75-73-69=285	−3	2,400
T16	(United States) Tom Weiskopf	74-71-69-71=285	−3	2,400
19	(New Zealand) Bob Charles	75-71-70-70=286	−2	2,200
T20	(United States) Dave Marr	74-71-71-71=287	−1	2,050
T20	(United States) Kermit Zarley	70-73-74-70=287	−1	2,050
T22	(United States) George Archer	75-71-72-70=288	E	1,760
T22	(United States) Gardner Dickinson	74-71-72-71=288	E	1,760
T22	(United States) Vinny Giles (a)	71-72-72-73=288	E	0
T22	(South Africa) Harold Henning	72-71-71-74=288	E	1,760
T22	(England) Tony Jacklin	69-73-74-72=288	E	1,760
T22	(United States) Art Wall Jr. (c)	74-74-73-67=288	E	1,760
T28	(United States) Jay Hebert	74-71-71-73=289	+1	1,400
T28	(Canada) George Knudson	75-71-72-71=289	+1	1,400
T30	(United States) Charles Coody	76-72-72-70=290	+2	1,400
T30	(United States) Al Geiberger	76-70-72-72=290	+2	1,400
T30	(Australia) Kel Nagle	76-71-72-71=290	+2	1,400
T30	(United States) Bobby Nichols	74-73-73-70=290	+2	1,400
T30	(United States) Bob Rosburg	74-73-71-72=290	+2	1,400
T35	(United States) Gay Brewer (c)	72-74-71-74=291	+3	1,375
T35	(Chinese Taipei) Chen Ching-Po	73-76-71-71=291	+3	1,375
T35	(England) Malcolm Gregson	76-71-74-70=291	+3	1,375
T35	(United States) Dan Sikes	73-76-70-72=291	+3	1,375
T35	(Japan) Hideyo Sugimoto	71-75-73-72=291	+3	1,375
T40	(United States) Paul Harney	78-70-70-74=292	+4	1,375
T40	(United States) Lee Trevino	71-72-69-80=292	+4	1,375
42	(United States) Sam Snead (c)	73-74-75-71=293	+5	1,350
T43	(United States) Gene Littler	73-73-76-72=294	+6	1,350
T43	(United States) Johnny Pott	75-68-75-76=294	+6	1,350
T45	(Canada) Gary Cowan (a)	78-71-73-73=295	+7	0
T45	(United States) Jack Lewis Jr. (a)	78-71-76-70=295	+7	0
T45	(United States) Don Massengale	76-73-73-73=295	+7	1,350
T48	(United States) William C. Campbell (a)	74-71-75-76=296	+8	0
T48	(United States) Doug Ford (c)	72-75-72-77=296	+8	1,350
T50	(United States) Dave Hill	79-70-73-75=297	+9	1,350
T50	(United States) Ken Venturi	75-74-73-75=297	+9	1,350
52	(Republic of Ireland) Joe Carr (a)	75-73-80-78=306	+18	0
CUT	(England) Peter Butler	72-78=150	+6	
CUT	(United States) Wes Ellis	76-74=150	+6	
CUT	(United States) Herman Keiser (c)	71-79=150	+6	
CUT	(Argentina) Raul Travieso	76-74=150	+6	
CUT	(United States) Don Bies	79-72=151	+7	
CUT	(United States) Tommy Jacobs	77-74=151	+7	
CUT	(United States) Arnold Palmer (c)	72-79=151	+7	
CUT	(Canada) Al Balding	75-77=152	+8	
CUT	(United States) Downing Gray (a)	76-76=152	+8	
CUT	(United States) Cary Middlecoff (c)	76-76=152	+8	
CUT	(United States) Doug Olson (a)	78-74=152	+8	
CUT	(United States) R. H. Sikes	75-77=152	+8	
CUT	(United States) Jack Burke Jr. (c)	79-74=153	+9	
CUT	(England) Tommy Horton	78-75=153	+9	
CUT	(United States) Jacky Cupit	77-77=154	+10	
CUT	(United States) Dutch Harrison	81-74=155	+11	
CUT	(United States) Deane Beman	77-79=156	+12	
CUT	(England) Clive Clark	81-75=156	+12	
CUT	(United States) Ed Tutwiler (a)	82-75=157	+13	
CUT	(United States) Ralph Guldahl (c)	82-81=163	+19	
WD	(United States) Henry Picard (c)	78	+6	
WD	(United States) Claude Harmon (c)			

==== Scorecard ====
Hole	1	2	3	4	5	6	7	8	9	10	11	12	13	14	15	16	17	18
Par	4	5	4	3	4	3	4	5	4	4	4	3	5	4	5	3	4	4
(United States) Goalby	−5	−5	−5	−5	−6	−7	−7	−8	−8	−8	−8	−8	−9	−10	−12	−12	−11	−11
(Argentina) De Vicenzo	−6	−7	−8	−8	−8	−8	−8	−9	−9	−9	−9	−10	−10	−10	−11	−11	−11^	−10
(United States) Yancey	−2	−3	−3	−3	−3	−3	−3	−4	−5	−5	−5	−5	−6	−6	−7	−8	−9	−9
(Australia) Devlin	−6	−7	−8	−8	−8	−8	−8	−8	−8	−8	−8	−8	−8	−8	−9	−8	−8	−8
(United States) Beard	−5	−5	−5	−5	−5	−5	−5	−3	−3	−3	−4	−4	−5	−5	−6	−6	−6	−7
(United States) Nicklaus	−2	−3	−3	−3	−3	−3	−3	−4	−4	−4	−5	−4	−5	−5	−6	−6	−7	−7
(United States) Floyd	−5	−5	−5	−5	−5	−4	−4	−5	−5	−5	−4	−5	−6	−6	−7	−6	−6	−6
(United States) January	−5	−5	−5	−5	−6	−6	−6	−6	−6	−6	−6	−5	−4	−4	−5	−5	−4	−4

^ De Vicenzo actually birdied the 17th hole, but signed for a par on his scorecard.

Cumulative tournament scores, relative to par

Eagle	Birdie	Bogey	Double bogey
