= Ed Tutwiler (golfer) =

American amateur golfer (1919–1988)

- Ed Tutwiler (left) in the 1949 West Virginia Open with Sam Snead (center), and William C. Campbell

Personal information
- Full name: Edgar Marten Tutwiler, Jr.
- Nationality: United States
- Born: July 29, 1919 Mount Hope, West Virginia, U.S.
- Died: November 18, 1988 (aged 69) Indianapolis, Indiana, U.S.
- Height: 6 ft 0 in (1.83 m)
- Weight: 170 lb (77 kg; 12 st)

Career
- Sport: Golf
- Status: Amateur

Best results in major championships
- Masters Tournament: T54: 1966
- PGA Championship: DNP
- U.S. Open: T36: 1966
- The Open Championship: DNP

Ed Tutwiler
- Military career
- Allegiance: United States
- Branch: U.S.A.F.

Edgar Marten Tutwiler, Jr. (July 29, 1919 – November 18, 1988) from Mount Hope, West Virginia was an American amateur golfer. Raised in southern West Virginia, he was a star athlete in high school, excelling in basketball; after initially making a name on the links while in school, Tutwiler captured the first of his eleven West Virginia Amateur crowns in 1939. Following some time in the Oklahoma oil fields, he returned to West Virginia where he ran a number of Charleston area businesses, most predominantly a Cadillac dealership. He moved to Indianapolis, Indiana in 1964 and established a new Cadillac franchise there. Tutwiler won three West Virginia Open titles, two Indiana Amateur's and finished runner-up in the 1964 U.S. Amateur and was a member of the U.S. Walker Cup team in 1965 and 1967.

== Early life ==
Tutwiler attended Mount Hope High School, where he was a star basketball player in 1937.

== Golf career ==
Tutwiler won numerous amateur and open events, including eleven West Virginia Amateurs between 1939 and 1963 (including three of the four West Virginia Amateurs played between 1939 and 1948), and three West Virginia Opens (1951, 1956 and 1962). He won the Porter Cup in 1962. Tutwiler finished runner-up in the 1964 U.S. Amateur to long-time rival and fellow West Virginia Golf Hall of Fame inductee Bill Campbell at Canterbury Golf Club. Tutwiler was twice Indiana State Amateur champion in 1966 and 1967. Tutwiler won the U.S. Seniors' Golf Association Championship in 1978 and 1986 and was a semi-finalist in the 1978 U.S. Senior Amateur. He competed in 15 U.S. Amateur championships. Tutwiler won the Senior Division of the Porter Cup in 1977 and 1978.

Tutwiler played on two Walker Cup teams, in 1965 and 1967, winning five of his six matches. He also played in the 1964 Eisenhower Trophy and the 1965 Americas Cup. He played in the U.S. Open, making the cut in 1965 (T38) and 1966 (T36), and the Masters Tournament in 1965, 1966 and 1968, making the cut in 1966 (T54).

== Awards ==
Tutwiler was recipient of the Hardman Award in 1958 as the West Virginia Amateur Athlete of the Year. In 1973, Tutwiler was inducted into the Indiana Golf Hall of Fame and West Virginia Golf Hall of Fame in 2010. Sports Illustrated included Tutwiler on its list of 50 Greatest West Virginia Sports Figures in 1999.

== Society of Seniors ==
Tutwiler was a founder of the Society of Seniors in the fall of 1982 at Wild Dunes Resort in Isle of Palms, South Carolina. The Ed Tutwiler Four-Ball was named in Tutwiler's honor. SOS tournaments are played at scratch. Members of the SOS include every living U.S. Senior Amateur Champion, numerous Walker Cup players and captains, and former U.S. Amateur, U.S. Mid-Amateur, British Amateur and British Senior Amateur Champions.

== U.S. national team appearances ==
Amateur

- Eisenhower Trophy: 1964
- Walker Cup: 1965 (tied, cup retained), 1967 (winners)
- Americas Cup: 1965
