= Reading Country Club =

- U.S. National Register of Historic Places
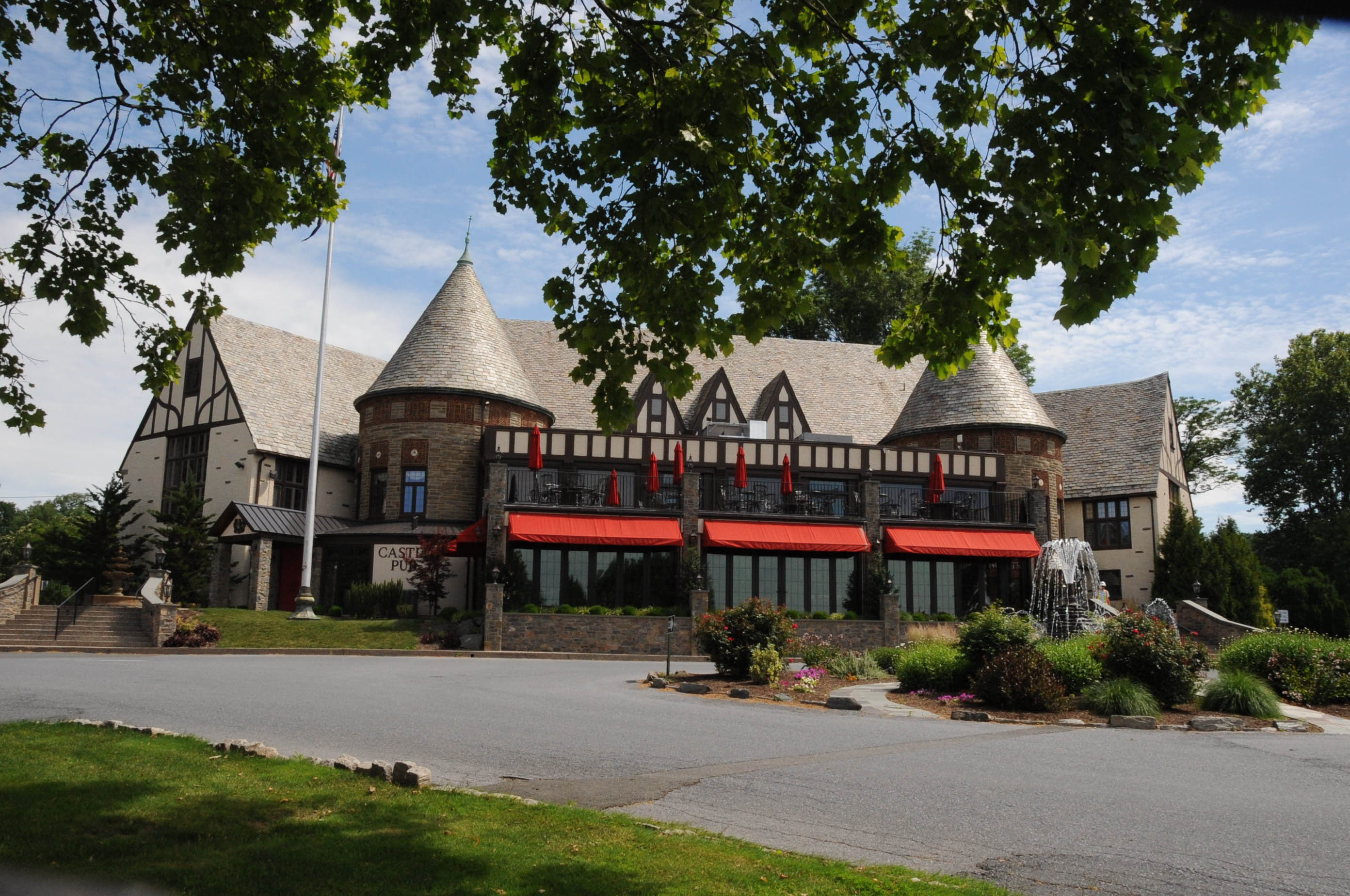
- The clubhouse building in 2018
- Location: 5311 Perkiomen Ave. Reading, Pennsylvania 19606
- Coordinates: 40°18′12″N 75°50′57″W
- Built: 1923
- Architect: Alexander Findlay (golf course) and Harry Maurer (clubhouse)
- Architectural style: Tudor Revival (clubhouse)
- NRHP reference No.: 100002521
- Added to NRHP: May 31, 2018

The Reading Country Club is a historic country club and municipal golf course located within and currently owned by Exeter Township, Berks County, Pennsylvania. The country club takes its name from the nearby city of Reading, Pennsylvania, the fourth-largest city in the state as of 2020.

== History ==
=== 20th century ===
The club was founded in 1923. Alexander Findlay, a pioneer of golf in the United States, designing the original nine hole course for the club and later expanded the course to 18 holes in 1925. The current course is mostly original, with only minor changes being made to the 10th and 17th holes.

The original clubhouse for the facility burned down in 1930. A new clubhouse was built in its place, designed by Reading-based architect Harry Maurer. The building was designed in the Tudor style to pay homage to Reading, Berkshire, the historic large market town in England for which Reading, Pennsylvania is named after.

In 1937, Byron Nelson was hired as the club pro, shortly after winning his first Masters Tournament. While serving as club pro, Nelson won his only U.S. Open in 1939. Nelson was succeeded by Henry Clay Poe, who served as club pro until 1965.

In the 1940s, due to a slow recovery from the Great Depression and America's entry into the World War II, the club faced financial difficulties that forced the club into bankruptcy, though golf continued to be played. In 1944, a group of 20 local businessmen bought the club for $80,000 and invested another $20,000 into refurbishing the course.

In 1949, the Reading Country Club hosted the Reading Open, a PGA Tour event from that ran from 1947 to 1951 and was usually hosted at the Berkshire Country Club in nearby Bern Township. During the tournament, Sam Snead set the course record of 63.

=== 21st century ===
Following several changes in ownership in the late 20th century, the club was purchased by Exeter Township in 2006, saving the land from development and opening the course to the public.

The building was listed on the National Register of Historic Places on May 31, 2018, becoming one of under 100 golf courses on the Register. The club was recognized both for the historic clubhouse and golf course, which is an important example of Alexander Findlay's design and a significant work of landscape architecture.
