= Washington Star Open =

Golf tournament

The Washington Star Open was a golf tournament played at Prince George's Country Club, Landover, Maryland in July 1949. The event was won by Sam Snead who took the first prize of $2,600. The event was sponsored by The Washington Star.

The event was played from July 1 to 4. Al Smith led after the first round with a 64, however after three rounds, Dutch Harrison and Sam Snead were tied for the lead. On the final day Harrison faded after a 75. Snead scored 70 and won by two strokes from Cary Middlecoff and three from Skip Alexander.

== Winners ==
| Year | Player | Country | Score | To par | Margin of victory | Runner-up | Winner's share ($) |
|---|---|---|---|---|---|---|---|
| 1949 | Sam Snead | United States | 272 | −16 | 2 strokes | (United States) Cary Middlecoff | 2,600 |
