= Sam Snead Festival =

Golf tournament from 1948 to 1961

The Sam Snead Festival was an unofficial money golf tournament, played from 1948 to 1961, at The Greenbrier in White Sulphur Springs, West Virginia. It attracted many PGA Tour players and was won by longtime Greenbrier club pro Sam Snead six times.

The tournament began as the Greenbrier Pro-Am in 1948, and was a 36-hole pro-amateur event with 18 invited top professionals of the day. Prizes were awarded for both the professional medal total and the pro-am best ball total. The event went to four rounds the next year; the first 36 holes with just the professionals, the amateurs joining in for the final 36 holes.

== Winners ==
Sam Snead Festival

- 1961 Sam Snead
- 1960 Dave Marr
- 1959 Sam Snead

Greenbrier Invitational

- 1958 Sam Snead
- 1957 Dutch Harrison

Greenbrier Pro-Am

- 1956 Ed Oliver
- 1955 Dutch Harrison
- 1954 Herman Scharlau
- 1953 Sam Snead
- 1952 Sam Snead
- 1951 Sam Snead
- 1950 Ben Hogan
- 1949 Cary Middlecoff
- 1948 Henry Cotton

== See also ==
- Greenbrier Classic, PGA Tour event starting in 2010
- The Greenbrier American Express Championship, Senior PGA Tour event from 1985–87
- White Sulphur Springs Open, a PGA Tour event, held irregularly in the 1920s and 1930s
