= Owen Elliot =

Owen Elliot may refer to:

- Owen Vanessa Elliot-Kugell (born 1967), American singer; daughter of Cass Elliott and Chuck Day
- Owen Elliot, American golfer; winner of the 2025 West Virginia Amateur Championship
- Owen Elliot (Nikita), a fictional character in the American TV series Nikita
