= West Virginia Open =

Golf tournament

Tournament information
- Location: West Virginia, U.S.
- Established: 1933
- Course: Different course each year
- Organized by: West Virginia Golf Association
- Format: Stroke play
- Month played: July

Current champion
- Mason Williams

The West Virginia Open is a golf tournament that is administered by the West Virginia Golf Association. It has been played annually since 1933 with the exception of 1959. World Golf Hall of Famer Sam Snead won the event a remarkable 17 times, including a record 22-stroke victory in 1957.

== Winners ==
Year	Champion	Margin of victory	Runner-up	Tournament location	Notes
2026	Mason Williams	3	Ryan Bilby	The Resort at Glade Springs, Daniels	
2025	Christian Brand (a) (4)	2	Ryan Bilby; Kenneth Hess	Sleepy Hollow Golf Club, Hurricane	
2024	Todd Duncan (a)	1	Will Evans	Edgewood Country Club, Sissonville	
2023	Ryan Bilby (a)	2	Mason Williams	Berry Hills Country Club, Charleston	
2022	Christian Brand (3)	3	David Bradshaw	Stonewall Jackson Resort, Roanoke	
2021	David Bradshaw (12)	3	Mason Williams	Pete Dye Golf Club, Bridgeport	
2020	Kenneth Hess	1	Thaddeus Obecny II	The Resort at Glade Springs, Daniels	
2019	David Bradshaw (11)	8	Josef Dransfeld	Parkersburg Country Club, Parkersburg	
2018	David Bradshaw (10)	6	Will Evans	The Resort at Glade Springs, Daniels	
2017	David Bradshaw (9)	3	Davey Jude	Edgewood Country Club, Sissonville	
2016	David Bradshaw (8)	4	Tad Tomblin (a)	Sleepy Hollow Golf Club, Hurricane	
2015	Christian Brand (2)	—	David Bradshaw	Berry Hills Country Club, Charleston	Brand won a three-hole playoff.
2014	Christian Brand	3	David Bradshaw	The Resort at Glade Springs, Daniels	
2013	David Bradshaw (7)	4	Sam O'Dell (a)	Parkersburg Country Club, Parkersburg	
2012	Jonathan Clark (2)	6	David Bradshaw; Christian Brand	Edgewood Country Club, Sissonville	
2011	David Bradshaw (6)	—	Bob Friend	Pines Country Club, Morgantown	Bradshaw won a three-hole playoff.
2010	David Bradshaw (5)	1	Tim Fisher (a)	Sleepy Hollow Golf Club, Hurricane	
2009	David Bradshaw (4)	—	John Ross	Oglebay Park, Wheeling	Bradshaw won a three-hole playoff.
2008	Barry Evans	3	David Bradshaw	Berry Hills Country Club, Charleston	
2007	David Bradshaw (3)	1	Bob Friend, Christian Brand (a), Pat Carter (a)	Lakeview Country Club, Morgantown	
2006	David Bradshaw (2)	1	Barry Evans, Jonathan Clark, Pat Carter (a)	The Resort at Glade Springs, Daniels	
2005	Craig Berner	—	Barry Evans	The Raven Golf Club, Snowshoe	Berner won a three-hole playoff.
2004	David Bradshaw (a)	1	Jonathan Clark	Edgewood Country Club, Sissonville	
2003	Brad Westfall (5)	—	Pat Carter (a)	Pines Country Club, Morgantown	Westfall won a three-hole playoff.
2002	Brad Westfall (4)	3	Sam O'Dell (a)	Sleepy Hollow Golf Club, Hurricane	
2001	Jonathan Clark	1	Brad Westfall	Berry Hills Country Club, Charleston	
2000	Brad Westfall (3)	4	Steve Shrawder	Pete Dye Golf Club, Bridgeport	
1999	John Ross (2)	7	Jonathan Clark	Guyan Golf and Country Club, Huntington	
1998	Scott Davis (4)	5	John Ross	Edgewood Country Club, Sissonville	
1997	John Ross	3	Gary Blake; Scott Davis	The Resort at Glade Springs, Daniels	
1996	Barney Thompson (3)	—	John Ross	Sleepy Hollow Golf Club, Hurricane	Thompson won on the first playoff hole.
1995	Scott Davis (3)	5	Greg Meade	Canaan Valley Resort State Park, Canaan Valley	
1994	Brad Westfall (2)	—	Scott Davis	Oglebay Park, Wheeling	Westfall won on the first playoff hole. The first round was rained out.
1993	Harold Payne (a) (4)	2	Brad Westfall	Pipestem Resort State Park, Summers County	
1992	Brad Westfall	8	Eric Shaffer (a)	Pines Country Club, Morgantown	
1991	Mike White (2)	1	Bob Bird	Moundsville Country Club, Moundsville	
1990	Scott Davis (2)	1	Mike White	Bridgeport Country Club, Bridgeport	
1989	Todd Satterfield (a)	—	Mike White	Sleepy Hollow Golf Club, Hurricane	Satterfield won on the first playoff hole.
1988	Harold Payne (a) (3)	3	Ned Weaver	Williams Country Club, Weirton	
1987	Harold Payne (a) (2)	8	Cleve Coldwater	The Resort at Glade Springs, Daniels	
1986	Harold Payne (a)	2	Scott Davis; Ed Vietmeier	Sleepy Hollow Golf Club, Hurricane	
1985	Buddy Cook	3	Four players	Guyan Golf and Country Club, Huntington	
1984	Linden Meade (2)	1	Ken Lacy	Fincastle Country Club, Bluefield, Virginia	
1983	Jim Fankhauser (a)	3	John Ross	Parkersburg Country Club, Parkersburg	
1982	Scott Davis	2	Linden Meade	Wheeling Country Club, Wheeling	
1981	Matt Cooke (a)	8	Benny Bowles	Berry Hills Country Club, Charleston	
1980	Mike White	4	Barry Fleming; Darrell Kestner	Fincastle Country Club, Bluefield, Virginia	
1979	Benny Bowles	1	William C. Campbell (a)	Williams Country Club, Weirton	
1978	Barney Thompson (2)	9	Jim Jamieson	The Greenbrier, White Sulphur Springs	
1977	Barry Fleming	2	Mark Wheaton; Randy Hillis (a)	Canaan Valley Resort State Park, Canaan Valley	
1976	Terry Smith	4	Doug Ray	Preston Country Club, Kingwood	
1975	Barney Thompson	2	Terry Smith	Canaan Valley Resort State Park, Canaan Valley	
1974	Blake Watt (a)	2	Jerry Walker	Moundsville Country Club, Moundsville	
1973	Sam Snead (17)	8	Scott Bess	Bridgeport Country Club, Bridgeport	
1972	Sam Snead (16)	2	Barney Thompson	South Hills Golf Club, Parkersburg	
1971	Sam Snead (15)	1	Billy Capps	Bel Meadow Golf Club, Mount Clare	The first round was rained out.
1970	Sam Snead (14)	12	Joe Taylor	Sandy Brae Golf Club, Amma	
1969	Joe Taylor (3)	1	Horace Ervin	Meadowbrook Recreation Club, Charleston	
1968	Sam Snead (13)	5	Billy Capps	Sleepy Hollow Golf Club, Hurricane	The first and final rounds were rained out.
1967	Sam Snead (12)	—	Roy Shreves	Moundsville Country Club, Moundsville	Snead won on the third playoff hole.
1966	Sam Snead (11)	10	Tom Cassady	South Hills Golf Club, Parkersburg	
1965	Joe Taylor (2)	10	George Hoffer	Lakeview Country Club, Morgantown	
1964	George Hoffer (2)	8	Joe Taylor	Par Mar Pines, Parkersburg	
1963	Linden Meade	1	Don Stickney	Kanawha Country Club, South Charleston	
1962	Ed Tutwiler (a) (3)	1	Joe Taylor	Sleepy Hollow Golf Club, Hurricane	
1961	Sam Snead (10)	5	Al Atkins	Riviera Country Club, Lesage	
1960	Sam Snead (9)	1	Art Wall Jr.	Spring Valley Country Club, Huntington	
1959	No tournament				
1958	Sam Snead (8)	14	William C. Campbell (a)	Lakeview Country Club, Morgantown	The final round were rained out.
1957	Sam Snead (7)	22	Mike Krak	Berry Hills Country Club, Charleston	
1956	Ed Tutwiler (a) (2)	7	Joe Taylor	The Greenbrier, White Sulphur Springs	
1955	William C. Campbell (a) (3)	5	Ed Tutwiler (a)	Guyan Country Club, Huntington	
1954	Joe Taylor	10	Ed Tutwiler (a)	Williams Country Club, Weirton	
1953	William C. Campbell (a) (2)	4	Sam Snead	Parkersburg Country Club, Parkersburg	
1952	Sam Snead (6)	9	Ed Tutwiler (a)	The Greenbrier, White Sulphur Springs	
1951	Ed Tutwiler (a)	6	Ray Vaughan, Jr.	White Oak Country Club, Oak Hill	
1950	William C. Campbell (a)	13	Larry Wiechman	Parkersburg Country Club, Parkersburg	
1949	Sam Snead (5)	18	George Hoffer	Spring Valley Country Club, Huntington	
1948	Sam Snead (4)	10	George Hoffer	Wheeling Country Club, Wheeling	
1947	George Hoffer	1	Rut Coffey	The Greenbrier, White Sulphur Springs	
1946	Rut Coffey	10	Roy Blizzard (a)	Moundsville Country Club, Moundsville	
1945	Arnold Browning	2	Jules Blanton	Greenbrier Valley Country Club, Lewisburg	First round abandoned due to hailstorm.
1944	Joe Reposkey	1	Andy Brawley (a)	Preston Country Club, Kingwood	
1943	Clem Wiechman (4)	2	D. G. Rangeley (a)	Black Knight Country Club, Beckley	
1942	Clem Wiechman (3)	1	Ray Vaughan, Jr.	Meadowbrook Recreation Club, Charleston	
1941	Clem Wiechman (2)	3	Johnny Javins	The Greenbrier, White Sulphur Springs	
1940	Bill Swing	2	Arnold Browning	Guyan Country Club, Huntington	
1939	Clem Wiechman	4	Earl Tolley	Bluefield Country Club, Bluefield	
1938	Sam Snead (3)	11	Art Clark	Cedar Rocks, Elm Grove	
1937	Sam Snead (2)	12	Art Clark	Kanawha Country Club, Charleston	
1936	Sam Snead	5	Art Clark	Guyan Country Club, Huntington	The tournament was reduced to three rounds, due to the second round being rained out.
1935	Rader Jewett (2)	2	Horace Brand	Clarksburg Country Club, Clarksburg	
1934	Rader Jewett	11	Bobby Rownd (a)	Cedar Rocks, Elm Grove	
1933	Johnny Javins	—	I.C. Schorr	Kanawha Country Club, South Charleston	Javins and Schorr tied, with both men splitting the prize money and Javins taking the trophy.

- (a) - denotes amateur
