= Jerry Pittman =

American golfer (born 1936)

Personal information
- Nationality: United States
- Born: November 19, 1936 (age 89)

Career
- Sport: Golf
- College: Southern Methodist University
- Status: Professional
- Former tour: PGA Tour
- Professional wins: 5

Best results in major championships
- Masters Tournament: T7: 1968
- PGA Championship: T33: 1967
- U.S. Open: T7: 1968
- The Open Championship: CUT: 1968

Jerry Pittman (born November 19, 1936) is an American professional golfer.

== Early life and amateur career ==
Pittman grew up in Tulsa, Oklahoma. He played college golf at Southern Methodist University.

== Professional career ==
Pittman played on the PGA Tour from 1960 to 1970. His best finish was T-5 at the 1962 Greater New Orleans Open Invitational. His best finishes in the majors were a pair of T-7s in 1968: at the Masters and at the U.S. Open.

Pittman was the club pro at Seminole Golf Club in West Palm Beach, Florida from 1973 to 2000.

== Professional wins (5) ==
- 1964 Oklahoma Open
- 1965 Metropolitan Open, Metropolitan PGA Championship
- 1968 Metropolitan Open, Long Island Open
