= Westchester 108 Hole Open =

Golf tournament

The Westchester 108 Hole Open was a golf tournament played at Fenway Golf Club, Scarsdale, New York in September 1938. The event was won by Sam Snead, who took the first prize of $5,000. The event was affected by bad weather, which delayed the start by two days, and it was not played again.

The event was originally planned to be played from September 21 to 25, but heavy rain delayed the start, and it was played from 23 to 27. With a field of over 250, the first round was played over two days, with the weaker players competing on the first day. The leading 150 and ties then played the second round on the third day. Further cuts reduced the field for the fourth and fifth days, with 36 holes played on both days. Billy Burke led after 36 holes with a score of 139, the only player under the par of 140, and retained the lead after 72 holes with a score of 286. Sam Snead, who started the day four strokes behind Burke, had rounds of 71 and 69 to finish with a winning score of 430. Burke took 78 in the fifth round but scored a final round 68 to finish in second place, two behind Snead. Byron Nelson and Paul Runyan tied for third place, four strokes behind the winner.

== Winners ==
Year	Player	Country	Score	To par	Margin of victory	Runner-up	Winner's share ($)
1938	Sam Snead	United States	430	+10	2 strokes	(United States) Billy Burke	5,000
