= Southwestern Invitational =

Golf tournament

The Southwestern Invitational was a golf tournament played at the Southern Hills Country Club in Tulsa, Oklahoma in September 1945. The event was won by Sam Snead who took the first prize of $2,000.

The event was played from September 14 to 16. Sam Snead led by strokes after 36 holes with rounds of 68 and 67. He scored 69 and 73 on the final day and won by nine shots from Vic Ghezzi and Ben Hogan.

== Winners ==
| Year | Player | Country | Score | To par | Margin of victory | Runners-up | Winner's share ($) |
|---|---|---|---|---|---|---|---|
| 1945 | Sam Snead | United States | 277 | −7 | 9 strokes | (United States) Vic Ghezzi (United States) Ben Hogan | 2,000 |
