= Henry Hurst Invitational =

Golf tournament

The Henry Hurst Invitational was a golf tournament played at the Torresdale-Frankford Country Club in Philadelphia, Pennsylvania in September 1941. The event was won by Sam Snead who took the first prize of $1,500. An event was planned for 1942 but was canceled.

The event was played from September 19 to 21. Sam Snead led after the first round with a 64. After a second round 74 he had rounds of 69 and 65 on the final day to win by 8 strokes from Dick Metz.

== Winners ==
Year	Player	Country	Score	To par	Margin of victory	Runner-up	Winner's share ($)
1941	Sam Snead	United States	272	−8	9 strokes	(United States) Dick Metz	1,500
