= 1968 U.S. Open =

1968 U.S. Open may refer to:

- 1968 U.S. Open (golf), a major golf tournament
- 1968 US Open (tennis), a Grand Slam tennis tournament
