= Reading Open =

Golf tournament formerly on the PGA Tour

The Reading Open was a golf tournament on the PGA Tour that was played in Reading, Pennsylvania in the late 1940s and early 1950s. It was played at three locations.

== Tournament hosts ==
| Year(s) | Venue |
|---|---|
| 1947–48 | Berkshire Country Club |
| 1949 | Reading Country Club |
| 1950 | Berkshire Country Club |
| 1951 | Berkleigh Country Club |

== Winners ==
| Year | Player | Country | Score | To par | Margin of victory | Runner-up | Winner's share ($) | Ref |
|---|---|---|---|---|---|---|---|---|
| 1951 | Jim Turnesa | United States | 280 | −4 | 3 strokes | (United States) Jack Burke Jr. | 2,400 | |
| 1950 | Sam Snead | United States | 268 | −20 | 8 strokes | (Australia) Jim Ferrier | 2,600 | |
| 1949 | Cary Middlecoff | United States | 266 | −14 | 1 stroke | (United States) Sam Snead | 2,600 | |
| 1948 | Ben Hogan | United States | 269 | −19 | 1 stroke | (United States) Fred Haas | 2,600 | |
| 1947 | Dutch Harrison | United States | 277 | −7 | 3 strokes | (South Africa) Bobby Locke | 2,000 | |
