= Buddy Cook =

American professional golfer

Archie Weldon "Buddy" Cook (March 26, 1926 – August 28, 2015) was an American professional golfer.

== Early life ==
Cook was born in Man, West Virginia.

== Professional career ==
Cook was a club pro at The Greenbrier from 1958 to 1972 and at Boca Raton Hotel and Club from 1956 to 1972. He played on the PGA Tour in the 1950s and on the Senior PGA Tour in the 1980s. Cook won the West Virginia Open in 1985 at the age of 59.

== Professional wins ==
- 1985 West Virginia Open
