= Ashwood, Virginia =

Unincorporated community in Virginia, United States

Ashwood
- Unincorporated community
- Location within the state of Virginia Ashwood (the United States)
- Coordinates: 37°58′21″N 79°51′01″W
- Country: United States
- State: Virginia
- County: Bath
- Elevation: 2,431 ft (741 m)
- Time zone: UTC−5 (Eastern (EST))
  - Summer (DST): UTC−4 (EDT)
- GNIS feature ID: 1495205

Ashwood is an unincorporated community in Bath County, Virginia, United States. It was the birthplace of golfer Sam Snead.
