= West Virginia Amateur Championship =

American golf tournament

The West Virginia Amateur Championship or West Virginia Amateur is a golf championship held in West Virginia for the states top amateur golfers. The tournament is run by the West Virginia Golf Association. The first event was held in 1913 at the Fairmont Country Club and was won by Julius Pollock Jr. The tournament was match play from 1913 to 1965 and has been stroke play since 1966. World Golf Hall of Famer William C. Campbell won the tournament a record 15 times.

== Winners ==
- 2026 Noah Mullens
- 2025 Owen Elliot
- 2024 Christian Brand
- 2023 Cameron Jarvis
- 2022 Noah Mullens
- 2021 Phillip Reale
- 2020 Alex Easthom
- 2019 Mason Williams
- 2018 Sam O'Dell
- 2017 Sam O'Dell
- 2016 Alan Cooke
- 2015 Sam O'Dell
- 2014 Brian Anania
- 2013 Sam O'Dell
- 2012 Pat Carter
- 2011 Christian Brand
- 2010 Jonathan Bartlett
- 2009 Tim Fisher
- 2008 Tim Fisher
- 2007 Anthony Reale
- 2006 Pat Carter
- 2005 Tim Fisher
- 2004 Pat Carter
- 2003 Pat Carter
- 2002 Pat Carter
- 2001 Pat Carter
- 2000 Pat Carter
- 1999 Pat Carter
- 1998 Pat Carter
- 1997 Pat Carter
- 1996 Pat Carter
- 1995 Pat Carter
- 1994 Steve Fox
- 1993 Harold Payne
- 1992 Eric Shaffer
- 1991 Harold Payne
- 1990 Scott Gilmore
- 1989 Pat Carter
- 1988 Steve Fox
- 1987 Harold Payne
- 1986 Harold Payne
- 1985 Danny Warren
- 1984 Scott Gilmore
- 1983 Danny Warren
- 1982 Greg Meade
- 1981 Charles M. Owens
- 1980 Ken Frye
- 1979 Harold Payne
- 1978 Scott Davis
- 1977 Jay Guthrie
- 1976 Jay Guthrie
- 1975 William C. Campbell
- 1974 William C. Campbell
- 1973 William C. Campbell
- 1972 William C. Campbell
- 1971 Barney Thompson
- 1970 William C. Campbell
- 1969 Barney Thompson
- 1968 William C. Campbell
- 1967 William C. Campbell
- 1966 Barney Thompson
- 1965 William C. Campbell
- 1964 Jim Ward
- 1963 Ed Tutwiler
- 1962 William C. Campbell
- 1961 Ed Tutwiler
- 1960 Ed Tutwiler
- 1959 William C. Campbell
- 1958 Ed Tutwiler
- 1957 William C. Campbell
- 1956 Ed Tutwiler
- 1955 William C. Campbell
- 1954 Ed Tutwiler
- 1953 Ed Tutwiler
- 1952 Ed Tutwiler
- 1951 William C. Campbell
- 1950 William C. Campbell
- 1949 William C. Campbell
- 1948 Ed Tutwiler
- 1942–1947 No tournament
- 1941 F.G. Bannerot Jr.
- 1940 Ed Tutwiler
- 1939 Ed Tutwiler
- 1938 F.M. Crum
- 1937 Tom Brand
- 1936 Tom Brand
- 1935 Tom Brand
- 1934 Tom Bloch
- 1933 F.G. Bannerot Jr.
- 1932 F.G. Bannerot Jr.
- 1931 Julius Pollock Jr.
- 1930 Palmer Stacy
- 1929 I.E. Rogers
- 1928 Julius Pollock Jr.
- 1927 Dan Rownd
- 1926 Forrest McNeill
- 1925 Denny Shute
- 1924 Julius Pollock Jr.
- 1923 Denny Shute
- 1922 Julius Pollock Jr.
- 1921 Julius Pollock Jr.
- 1920 Forrest McNeill
- 1919 Julius Pollock Jr.
- 1918 Forrest McNeill
- 1917 No tournament
- 1916 George W. Hewitt
- 1915 Julius Pollock Jr.
- 1914 Julius Pollock Jr.
- 1913 Julius Pollock Jr.

=== Multiple winners ===
- 15 wins
  - William C. Campbell (1949, 1950, 1951, 1955, 1957, 1959, 1962, 1965, 1967, 1968, 1970, 1972, 1973, 1974, 1975)
- 13 wins
  - Pat Carter (1989, 1995, 1996, 1997, 1998, 1999, 2000, 2001, 2002, 2003, 2004, 2006, 2012)
- 11 wins
  - Ed Tutwiler (1939, 1940, 1948, 1952, 1953, 1954, 1956, 1958, 1960, 1961, 1963)
- 9 wins
  - Julius Pollock Jr. (1913, 1914, 1915, 1919, 1921, 1922, 1924, 1928, 1931)
- 5 wins
  - Harold Payne (1979, 1986, 1987, 1991, 1993)
- 4 wins
  - Tom Bloch (1934, 1935, 1936, 1937)
  - Sam O'Dell (2013, 2015, 2017, 2018)
- 3 wins
  - Forrest McNeill (1918, 1920, 1926)
  - F.G. Bannerot Jr. (1932, 1933, 1941)
  - Barney Thompson (1966, 1969, 1971)
  - Tim Fisher (2005, 2008, 2009)
- 2 wins
  - Denny Shute (1923, 1925)
  - Jay Guthrie (1976, 1977)
  - Danny Warren (1983, 1985)
  - Scott Gilmore (1984, 1990)
  - Steve Fox (1988, 1994)
  - Christian Brand (2011, 2024)
  - Noah Mullens (2022, 2026)
