= Daniels, West Virginia =

- Census-designated place (CDP)
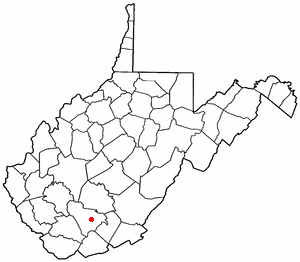
- Location of Daniels, West Virginia
- Coordinates: 37°43′32″N 81°07′28″W
- Country: United States
- State: West Virginia
- County: Raleigh

Area
  - Total: 4.6 sq mi (12.0 km^{2})
  - Land: 4.6 sq mi (12.0 km^{2})
  - Water: 0 sq mi (0.0 km^{2})
- Elevation: 2,471 ft (753 m)

Population (2020)
  - Total: 1,654
  - Density: 357/sq mi (138/km^{2})
- Time zone: UTC-5 (Eastern (EST))
  - Summer (DST): UTC-4 (EDT)
- ZIP code: 25832
- Area code: 304
- FIPS code: 54-20164
- GNIS feature ID: 2389393

Daniels is a census-designated place (CDP) in Raleigh County, West Virginia, United States. The population was 1,654 at the 2020 census.

== Geography ==
According to the United States Census Bureau, the CDP has a total area of 4.6 square miles (12.0 km^{2}), all land.

Daniels is located on U.S. Route 19, south of Interstate 64.

== Demographics ==
Historical population
Census	Pop.	Note	%±
2000	1,846		—
2010	1,881		1.9%
2020	1,654		−12.1%
U.S. Decennial Census

At the 2000 census there were 1,846 people, 818 households, and 525 families living in the CDP. The population density was 395.0 people per square mile (152.6/km^{2}). There were 913 housing units at an average density of 195.4/sq mi (75.5/km^{2}). The racial makeup of the CDP was 97.72% White, 1.08% African American, 0.22% Native American, 0.60% Asian, 0.16% from other races, and 0.22% from two or more races. Hispanic or Latino of any race were 0.43%.

Of the 818 households 23.7% had children under the age of 18 living with them, 53.3% were married couples living together, 8.3% had a female householder with no husband present, and 35.7% were non-families. 32.4% of households were one person and 19.6% were one person aged 65 or older. The average household size was 2.17 and the average family size was 2.70.

The age distribution was 18.9% under the age of 18, 7.5% from 18 to 24, 25.4% from 25 to 44, 23.6% from 45 to 64, and 24.7% 65 or older. The median age was 43 years. For every 100 females, there were 82.6 males. For every 100 females age 18 and over, there were 76.4 males.

The median household income was $27,955 and the median family income was $40,125. Males had a median income of $29,519 versus $20,000 for females. The per capita income for the CDP was $22,266. About 11.6% of families and 12.4% of the population were below the poverty line, including 7.9% of those under age 18 and 9.7% of those age 65 or over.
