= William C. Campbell (golfer) =

American amateur golfer (1923–2013)

Personal information
- Full name: William Cammack Campbell
- Nationality: United States
- Born: May 5, 1923 Huntington, West Virginia, U.S.
- Died: August 30, 2013 (aged 90) Lewisburg, West Virginia, U.S.
- Height: 6 ft 4 in (1.93 m)
- Weight: 185 lb (84 kg; 13.2 st)

Career
- Sport: Golf
- College: Princeton University
- Status: Amateur

Best results in major championships
- Masters Tournament: T36: 1955, 1966
- PGA Championship: DNP
- U.S. Open: T23: 1954
- The Open Championship: DNP
- U.S. Amateur: Won: 1964
- British Amateur: 2nd: 1954

Achievements and awards
- World Golf Hall of Fame: 1990 (member page)
- Bob Jones Award: 1956
- Old Tom Morris Award: 1991

William C. Campbell
- Military career
- Allegiance: United States
- Branch: Army

William Cammack Campbell (May 5, 1923 – August 30, 2013), often known as Bill Campbell or William C. Campbell, became one of the most distinguished amateur golfers in golf history. Campbell was two-time President of the United States Golf Association (USGA) and one time Captain of The Royal and Ancient Golf Club of St Andrews. He was inducted to the World Golf Hall of Fame in 1990.

== Early life and amateur career ==
Campbell was born in Huntington, West Virginia. He graduated from Phillips Exeter Academy where he won his first tournaments, served in the U.S. Army in Europe during World War II and graduated from Princeton University in 1947 with a degree in history. Campbell was a star in collegiate golf and swimming competitions while at Princeton.

== Career ==
With little desire to play professionally, Campbell ran his family's Huntington insurance firm for close to sixty years, served in the West Virginia State legislature and sat on numerous corporate boards.

In his amateur golfing career, Campbell played in 37 U.S. Amateurs, including 33 consecutively from 1941–77. Campbell's victory in the 1964 U.S. Amateur at Canterbury Golf Club was his crowning achievement on the golf course. He played on eight Walker Cup teams from 1951 to 1975, captaining the 1955 team, and finished with an overall record of 11–4–3 (7–0–1 in singles matches). He was runner-up in the 1954 British Amateur. He was three times runner-up in the Canadian Amateur Championship, in 1952, 1954, and 1965. He won three West Virginia Opens, four North and South Amateurs, and fifteen West Virginia Amateur titles. He won the U.S. Senior Amateur in 1979 and 1980 (medalist in 1979, 1980, and 1984), and finished 2nd overall in the 1980 U.S. Senior Open.

Campbell qualified for 19 Masters Tournaments and played in 18 of them in a span of 26 years, more than any amateur in history. He also played in 15 U.S. Opens.

Campbell served on the Executive Committee of the USGA from 1962–1965, and again from 1977 to 1984. He was the treasurer in 1978–1979, vice-president in 1980–1981, then served as president in 1982 and 1983. In 1987, he was named Captain of The Royal and Ancient Golf Club of St Andrews, just the third American to hold that post, becoming the first person to head both of golf's main governing bodies.

== Personal life ==
Campbell was the stepfather of Academy Award-nominated actor Brad Dourif.

== Awards and honors ==
- In 1956, he was awarded the Bob Jones Award, the USGA's highest honor
- In 1990, Campbell was inducted to the World Golf Hall of Fame
- In 1991, he received the Old Tom Morris Award from the Golf Course Superintendents Association of America, GCSAA's highest honor
- In 2009, Campbell was inducted into the West Virginia Golf Hall of Fame in 2009 with Sam Snead

== Tournament wins (32) ==
- 1941 Eastern Interscholastic Champion
- 1943 Eastern Intercollegiate Champion
- 1946 Eastern Intercollegiate Champion
- 1948 Tam O'Shanter World Amateur
- 1949 Tam O'Shanter World Amateur, West Virginia Amateur
- 1950 West Virginia Open, North and South Amateur, West Virginia Amateur
- 1951 West Virginia Amateur
- 1953 West Virginia Open, North and South Amateur
- 1955 West Virginia Open, West Virginia Amateur
- 1956 Mexican Amateur
- 1957 North and South Amateur, West Virginia Amateur
- 1959 West Virginia Amateur
- 1962 West Virginia Amateur
- 1964 U.S. Amateur
- 1965 West Virginia Amateur
- 1967 Ontario Amateur, North and South Amateur, West Virginia Amateur
- 1968 West Virginia Amateur
- 1970 West Virginia Amateur
- 1972 West Virginia Amateur
- 1973 West Virginia Amateur
- 1974 West Virginia Amateur
- 1975 West Virginia Amateur
- 1979 U.S. Senior Amateur
- 1980 U.S. Senior Amateur

== Results in major championships ==
=== Amateur wins (1) ===
| Year | Championship | Winning score | Runner-up |
|---|---|---|---|
| 1964 | U.S. Amateur | 1 up | (United States) Ed Tutwiler |

=== Results timeline ===
| Tournament | 1941 | 1942 | 1943 | 1944 | 1945 | 1946 | 1947 | 1948 | 1949 |
|---|---|---|---|---|---|---|---|---|---|
| Masters Tournament | | | NT | NT | NT | | | | |
| U.S. Open | | NT | NT | NT | NT | | | | CUT |
| U.S. Amateur | DNQ | NT | NT | NT | NT | – | R128 | R128 | SF |
| British Amateur | NT | NT | NT | NT | NT | | | | R64 |

| Tournament | 1950 | 1951 | 1952 | 1953 | 1954 | 1955 | 1956 | 1957 | 1958 | 1959 |
|---|---|---|---|---|---|---|---|---|---|---|
| Masters Tournament | T46 | 59 | | T45 | T51 | T36 | T43 | CUT | CUT | CUT |
| U.S. Open | CUT | | CUT | CUT | T23 | | | CUT | | |
| U.S. Amateur | R256 | R256 | R16 | R16 | R16 | R64 | R16 | R64 | R128 | R128 |
| British Amateur | R16 | R16 | | R32 | 2 | R256 | | | | |

| Tournament | 1960 | 1961 | 1962 | 1963 | 1964 | 1965 | 1966 | 1967 | 1968 | 1969 |
|---|---|---|---|---|---|---|---|---|---|---|
| Masters Tournament | CUT | CUT | | | | CUT | T36 | | T48 | |
| U.S. Open | | | CUT | CUT | T34 | CUT | | | CUT | |
| U.S. Amateur | R64 | R256 | R128 | R16 | 1 | T8 | T16 | T7 | T33 | T39 |
| British Amateur | | | | | | R256 | R64 | R128 | | |

| Tournament | 1970 | 1971 | 1972 | 1973 | 1974 | 1975 | 1976 | 1977 | 1978 | 1979 | 1980 | 1981 |
|---|---|---|---|---|---|---|---|---|---|---|---|---|
| Masters Tournament | | CUT | WD | | CUT | | CUT | | | | | |
| U.S. Open | CUT | | | CUT | CUT | CUT | | | | | | |
| U.S. Amateur | T8 | T14 | T23 | SF | QF | R256 | R32 | R128 | | DNQ | – | DNQ |
| British Amateur | | R256 | | | | R256 | | | | | | |

Note: Campbell never played in the British Open nor the PGA Championship (for which he was never eligible being an amateur).

Win
Top 10
Did not play

LA = Low Amateur
CUT = missed the half-way cut
DNQ = Did not qualify for match play portion
R256, R128, R64, R32, R16, QF, SF = Round in which player lost in match play
"T" indicates a tie for a place

Source for The Masters: www.masters.com

Source for U.S. Open and U.S. Amateur:USGA Championship Database

Source for 1949 British Amateur: The Glasgow Herald, May 26, 1949, pg. 8.

Source for 1950 British Amateur: The Glasgow Herald, May 26, 1950, pg. 7.

Source for 1951 British Amateur: The Glasgow Herald, May 25, 1951, pg. 7.

Source for 1953 British Amateur: The Glasgow Herald, May 29, 1953, pg. 4.

Source for 1955 British Amateur: The Glasgow Herald, June 1, 1955, pg. 4.

Source for 1973 U.S. Amateur:

Source for 1974 U.S. Amateur:

== U.S. national team appearances ==
Amateur

- Walker Cup: 1951 (winners), 1953 (winners), 1955 (winners, playing captain), 1957 (winners), 1965 (tied, cup retained), 1967 (winners), 1971, 1975 (winners)
- Eisenhower Trophy: 1964
- Americas Cup: 1952 (winners), 1954 (winners), 1956 (winners), 1965, 1967 (winners)
