= White Sulphur Springs Open =

Golf tournament formerly on the PGA Tour

The White Sulphur Springs Open was a PGA Tour event that was played on the Old White Course of the Greenbrier Hotel in White Sulphur Springs, West Virginia during the 1920s and 1930s. The hotel is now a 721-room resort called The Greenbrier. The Old White Course opened in 1914 and is named after the Old White Hotel, which stood on the grounds from 1858 to 1922.

== Winners ==
- 1955 Dutch Harrison
- 1948 Henry Cotton
- 1938 Sam Snead
- 1922 Walter Hagen
- 1921 Jock Hutchison

== See also ==
- Greenbrier Classic, a PGA Tour event that debuted at The Greenbrier in 2010
