= Sam Snead =

American professional golfer (1912–2002)

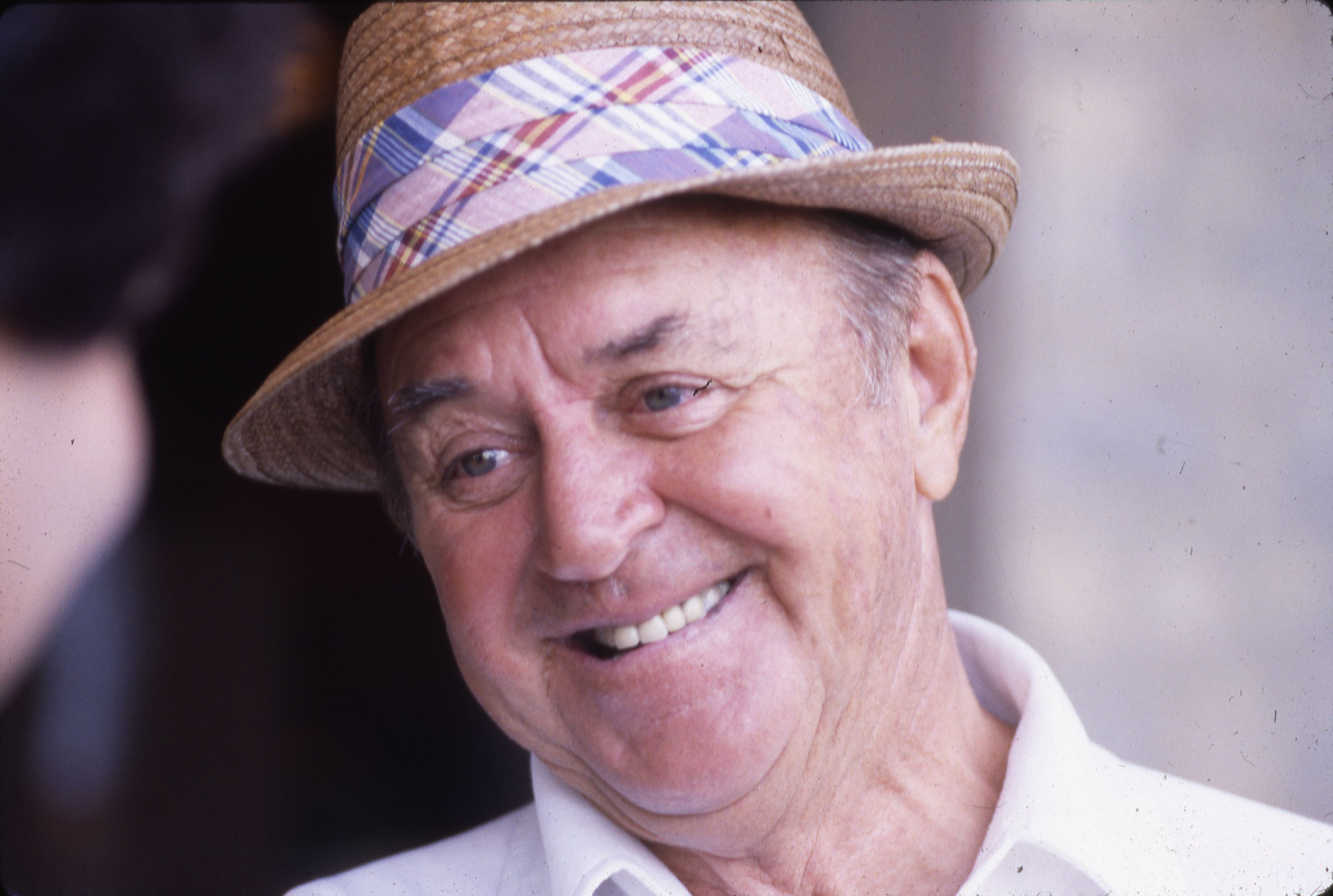
- Snead in 1984

Personal information
- Full name: Samuel Jackson Snead
- Nicknames: The Slammer; Slammin' Sammy
- Nationality: United States
- Born: May 27, 1912 Ashwood, Virginia, U.S.
- Died: May 23, 2002 (aged 89) Hot Springs, Virginia, U.S.
- Height: 5 ft 11 in (180 cm)
- Weight: 185 lb (84 kg)
- Spouse: Audrey Karnes (m. 1940; died 1990)
- Children: 2

Career
- Sport: Golf
- Turned professional: 1934
- Former tours: PGA Tour; Champions Tour
- Professional wins: 143

Number of wins by tour
- PGA Tour: 82 (tied 1st all time)
- LPGA Tour: 1
- Other: 46 (regular); 14 (senior)

Best results in major championships (wins: 7)
- Masters Tournament: Won: 1949, 1952, 1954
- PGA Championship: Won: 1942, 1949, 1951
- U.S. Open: 2nd/T2: 1937, 1947, 1949, 1953
- The Open Championship: Won: 1946

Achievements and awards
- World Golf Hall of Fame: 1974 (member page)
- PGA Tour leading money winner: 1938, 1949, 1950
- PGA Golfer of the Year: 1949
- Vardon Trophy: 1938, 1949, 1950, 1955
- PGA Tour Lifetime Achievement Award: 1998

Samuel Jackson Snead (/sniːd/ SNEED; May 27, 1912 – May 23, 2002) was an American professional golfer who was one of the top players in the world for the better part of four decades (having won PGA of America and Senior PGA Tour events over six decades) and widely regarded as one of the greatest players of all time. Snead was awarded a record 94 gold medallions, for wins in PGA of America (referred to by most as the PGA) Tour events and later credited with winning a record 82 PGA Tour events tied with Tiger Woods, including seven majors. He never won the U.S. Open, though he was runner-up four times. Snead was inducted into the World Golf Hall of Fame in 1974.

Snead's nicknames included "The Slammer", "Slammin' Sammy Snead", and "The Long Ball Hitter from West Virginia", and he was admired by many for having a "perfect swing", which generated many imitators. Snead was famed for his folksy image, wearing a straw hat, and making such statements as "Keep close count of your nickels and dimes, stay away from whiskey, and never concede a putt," and, "There are no short hitters on the tour anymore, just long and unbelievably long." Fellow West Virginia Golf Hall of Fame Inductee Bill Campbell has said of Snead, "He was the best natural player ever. He had the eye of an eagle, the grace of a leopard, and the strength of a lion." Gary Player once said, "I don't think there's any question in my mind that Sam Snead had the greatest golf swing of any human being that ever lived." Jack Nicklaus said that Snead's swing was "so perfect ... and the most fluid motion in the game of golf".

== Biography ==
=== Personal life ===
Born in Ashwood, Virginia, near Hot Springs, Snead began caddying at age seven at The Homestead's Old Course in Hot Springs. He worked as an assistant pro at The Homestead at 17 in 1929, then moved to the Cascades Course and turned professional in 1934. During the depression, Snead taught himself the game of golf from a set of clubs carved from tree limbs. Snead joined the PGA Tour in 1936 and achieved immediate success by winning the West Virginia Closed Pro tournament.

In 1936 he won two matches at the Meadow Brook Club, earning a $10,000 prize. This gave him the money he needed to start playing professionally full-time. In 1944 he became resident playing professional at The Greenbrier Resort in White Sulphur Springs, West Virginia, and maintained ties to Hot Springs and The Homestead all of his life. During the winter, he was a resident playing pro at the Boca Raton Resort from 1956 to 1969. Each spring he returned to the Mid-Atlantic, stopping at The Masters Tournament on his way back to The Greenbrier.

Snead served in the U.S. Navy during World War II from 1942 to 1944. He was an athletic specialist in Cmdr. Gene Tunney's program in San Diego, and was given a medical discharge for a back injury in September 1944.

Snead appeared as himself in an episode of The Phil Silvers Show, "The Colonel Breaks Par", in 1957.

His nephew, J. C. Snead, was also a successful professional golfer, winning tournaments on both the PGA Tour and the Champions Tour.

=== Career ===
In July 1936, Snead won his first tournament, the West Virginia Closed Pro, contested at The Greenbrier's Championship Course and Old White Course. He shot rounds of 70–61 to rout Logan, West Virginia professional, Clem Wiechman by 16 strokes (74-73). The following month, he won the first of 17 West Virginia Open championships by beating Art Clark by five strokes at Guyan Country Club in Huntington, West Virginia.

In 1937, Snead's first full year on the PGA Tour, he won six events, including the Oakland Open at Claremont Country Club in California and his second West Virginia Open. In Snead's debut in the U.S. Open hosted at Oakland Hills, he finished runner-up to Ralph Guldahl (who won with 19 clubs in his bag). Snead shared the first round lead shooting 69 with fellow West Virginian Denny Shute (1936 and 1937 PGA Champion). In Snead's first of two attempts in The Open Championship, he finished tied for 11th.

In 1938, Snead first won the Greater Greensboro Open, the first of eight times, the Tour record for victories in a single tournament event. Snead's last win at Greensboro was in 1965, at the age of 52 years, 311 days, making him the oldest player to win a PGA Tour event. Snead introduced his first book, Sam Snead's quick way to better golf.

In 1939, Snead won three times. 1939 was the first of four times (although Snead had already come close in 1937, losing to the eventual champion who had 19 clubs in his bag) where Snead failed at crucial moments of the U.S. Open, the only major event he never won. Needing a par to win at the Philadelphia C.C., but not knowing that, since on-course scoreboards did not exist at that time, Snead posted a triple-bogey 8 on the par-5 72nd hole, taking a risky shot from a difficult lie in the fairway. Snead had been told on the 18th tee by a spectator that he needed a birdie to win. Snead ended up in fifth place, two shots behind three players who went into a playoff.

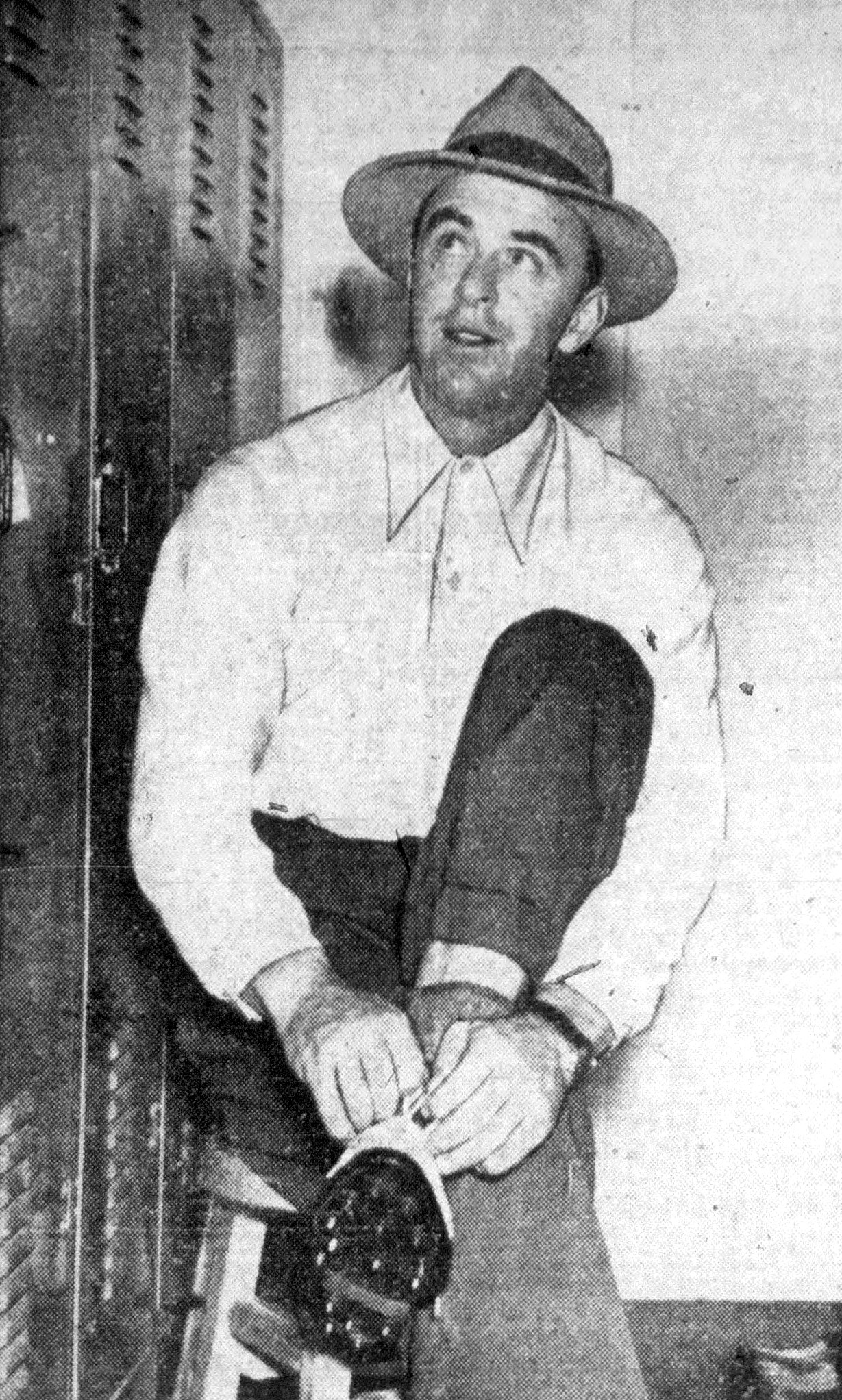
Snead lacing up his golf shoes in the locker room, circa 1945

During World War II, Snead was prevented from participating in 14 major championships (1940–1945 Open Championship, 1942–1945 U.S. Open, 1943–1945 Masters, 1943 PGA Championship), due to their cancellations. Snead served in the U.S. Navy from 1942 to 1944.

In 1946, Snead won six times including the Open Championship at St Andrews. His expenses for playing there were more than three times his winning purse. Snead tied for sixth in the Open in 1962. Snead introduced the book, Sam Snead's How to play golf, and professional tips on improving your score. Also, rules of the game of golf, as approved by the United States Golf Association, and by the Royal and ancient golf club of St. Andrews.

At the U.S. Open in 1947, Snead missed a 30-inch (76 cm) putt on the final playoff hole to finish runner-up to Lew Worsham.

Snead won three times in 1948, including his first Texas Open and fourth West Virginia Open.

In 1949, Snead won nine PGA events including two majors including the Masters and the PGA Championship and was awarded Golfer of the Year. For Snead, it was the third of four second-place finishes at the U.S. Open. Needing two pars to finish in a tie for the lead, Snead took three shots to hole out his ball from the fringe of the green on the 17th hole.

In 1950, Snead won 11 events, placing him third in that category behind Byron Nelson (18, in 1945) and Ben Hogan (13, in 1946). Snead claimed that 1950 was his "greatest year" winning "eleven tournaments" including a playoff victory over Hogan in the L.A. Open yet lost the "Golfer of the Year" to Hogan, who won one "tournament". His scoring average of 69.23 was a Vardon Trophy record that stood for 50 years.

In 1952, Snead won ten events including the Masters. At the Jacksonville Open, Snead forfeited rather than play an 18-hole playoff against Doug Ford after the two golfers finished in a tie at the end of regulation play. The forfeit stemmed from a ruling Snead received during the tournament's second round of play. On the 10th hole, Snead's drive landed behind an out-of-bounds stake. While Chick Harbert, who was playing with Snead, thought the ball was out of bounds, a rules official ruled differently due to the starter not telling players the stakes had been moved after the previous day's play had ended. Afterward, Snead explained why he forfeited even though Ford suggested they play sudden death for the title. "I want to be fair about it. I don't want anyone to think I took advantage of the ruling." Snead set the record for most PGA wins after reaching age 40, with 17.

In 1953, Snead won three events. He finished runner-up to Ben Hogan at the U.S. Open (the fourth time he would finish runner-up at the U.S. Open).

In 1954, Snead won two events, one of which was the Masters in an 18-hole playoff over Ben Hogan.

In December 1959, Snead took part in a controversial match against Mason Rudolph, at the Mid Ocean Club in Bermuda. The match played under the NBC's "World Championship Golf" series, was a match-play event that was tied after 11 holes. On the 12th hole, Snead discovered that he had a 15th club in the bag, a violation of the Rules of Golf that limits a player to 14 clubs. The extra club in his bag, a fairway wood Snead had been experimenting with in practice, meant Rudolph had won on the 12th hole immediately, 11 and 7, after applying the penalty of a loss of hole for each hole the club was in the bag, even though he did not use it during the round. With the match legally concluded, Snead deliberately missed puts later in the program to create the legitimate result, a Rudolph win. Snead explained the match had ended up on the 11 loss of hole penalties, and said he did not disqualify himself in order not to spoil the show. This occurred shortly after the investigations into the quiz show scandals where players were given answers to questions in fixed matches. The match was broadcast in April 1960, and the sponsor canceled further participation in the series after Snead's admission he recreated the result after the match officially ended as a Rudolph win. The rule was changed for the 1964 Rules of Golf, where the penalty is capped at two holes (match play) or two strokes per hole capped at four strokes (stroke play).

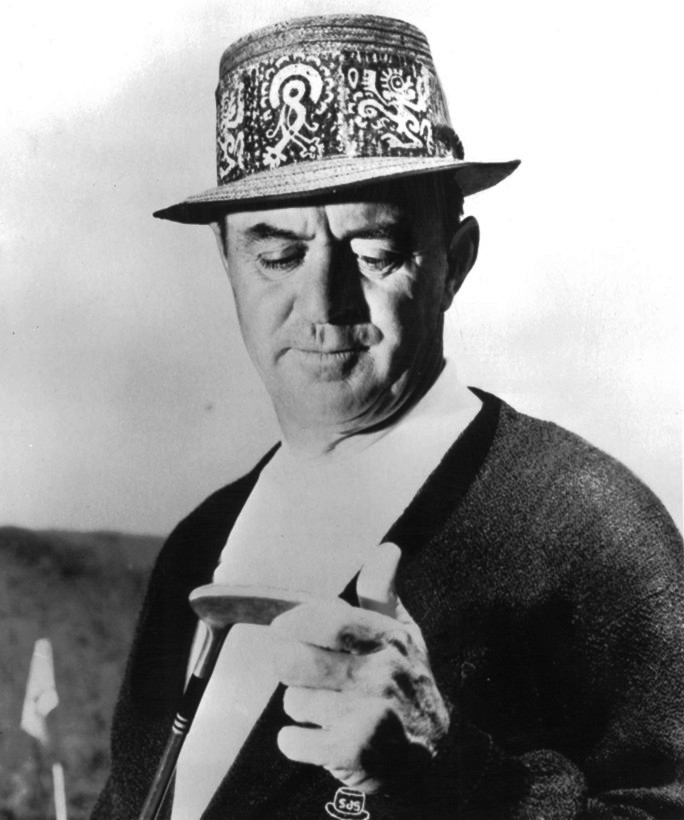
A publicity photo of Snead for his ABC television program The Sam Snead Golf Show in 1967.

Beginning in 1960, Snead hosted television's Celebrity Golf program, emceed by Harry von Zell, competing for charity in nine-hole contests against Hollywood celebrities like Dean Martin, Jerry Lewis and Bob Hope. Snead had appeared with Martin and Lewis in their 1953 comedy film, The Caddy.

On February 7, 1962, at age 49, Snead won the Royal Poinciana Plaza Invitational, an LPGA Tour "Battle of the Sexes" tournament where he faced off against 14 LPGA pros. The low woman was Mickey Wright, herself Snead's equivalent in women's golf, with the most wins on that tour.

His 1962 autobiography was titled The Education of a Golfer. Snead later wrote several golf instructional books, and frequently wrote instructional columns in golf magazines.

In 1965, Snead became the oldest player (52 years, 10 months, and 8 days) to win on the PGA Tour (the Greater Greensboro Open).

Snead played on seven Ryder Cup teams: 1937, 1947, 1949, 1951, 1953, 1955, and 1959. Snead was selected to the 1939 Ryder Cup team however the event was never played due to World War II. He captained the team in 1951, 1959, and 1969.

In 1971, he won the PGA Club Professional Championship at Pinehurst Resort.

In 1973, Snead became the oldest player to make a cut in a U.S. Open at age 61.

In 1974, at age 61, he shot a third-round 66 at the Los Angeles Open at Riviera Country Club to move into contention. A birdie at #17 in the last round moved him to within one stroke of the lead. Dave Stockton hit a miraculous fairway wood on the final hole. Snead was joint runner-up.

He shot a final-round 68 at the 1974 PGA Championship to finish tied for third, three strokes behind winner Lee Trevino. At age 62, it was Snead's third consecutive top-10 finish at the PGA Championship, but his last time in contention at a major.

In 1978, he won the first Legends of Golf event, which was the impetus for the creation, two years later, of the Senior PGA Tour, now the Champions Tour.

In 1979, he was the youngest PGA Tour golfer to shoot his age (67) in the second round of the 1979 Quad Cities Open. He shot under his age (66) in the final round.

In 1982, he teamed with Don January to shoot 27-under-par to win the rain-shortened 54-hole Liberty Mutual Legends of Golf event at Onion Creek Club "The Birthplace of the Senior PGA Tour" in Austin, Texas. This victory would mark victories for Snead that spanned over six decades (1930s–1980s) winning tour and senior tour events.

In 1983, at age 71, he shot a round of 60 (12-under-par) at The Homestead in Hot Springs, Virginia.

In 1986, Snead wrote the book, Pigeons, Marks, Hustlers and Other Golf Bettors You Can Beat.

In 1997, at age 85, he shot a round of 78 at the Old White course of The Greenbrier in White Sulphur Springs, West Virginia.

In 1998, he received the PGA Tour Lifetime Achievement Award, the fourth person to be so honored.

From 1984 to 2002, he hit the honorary starting tee shot at the Masters Tournament. Until 1999, he was joined by Gene Sarazen, and until 2001, by Byron Nelson.

In 2000, Snead was ranked the third greatest golfer of all time, in Golf Digest magazine's rankings, behind only Jack Nicklaus and Ben Hogan.

=== Death ===
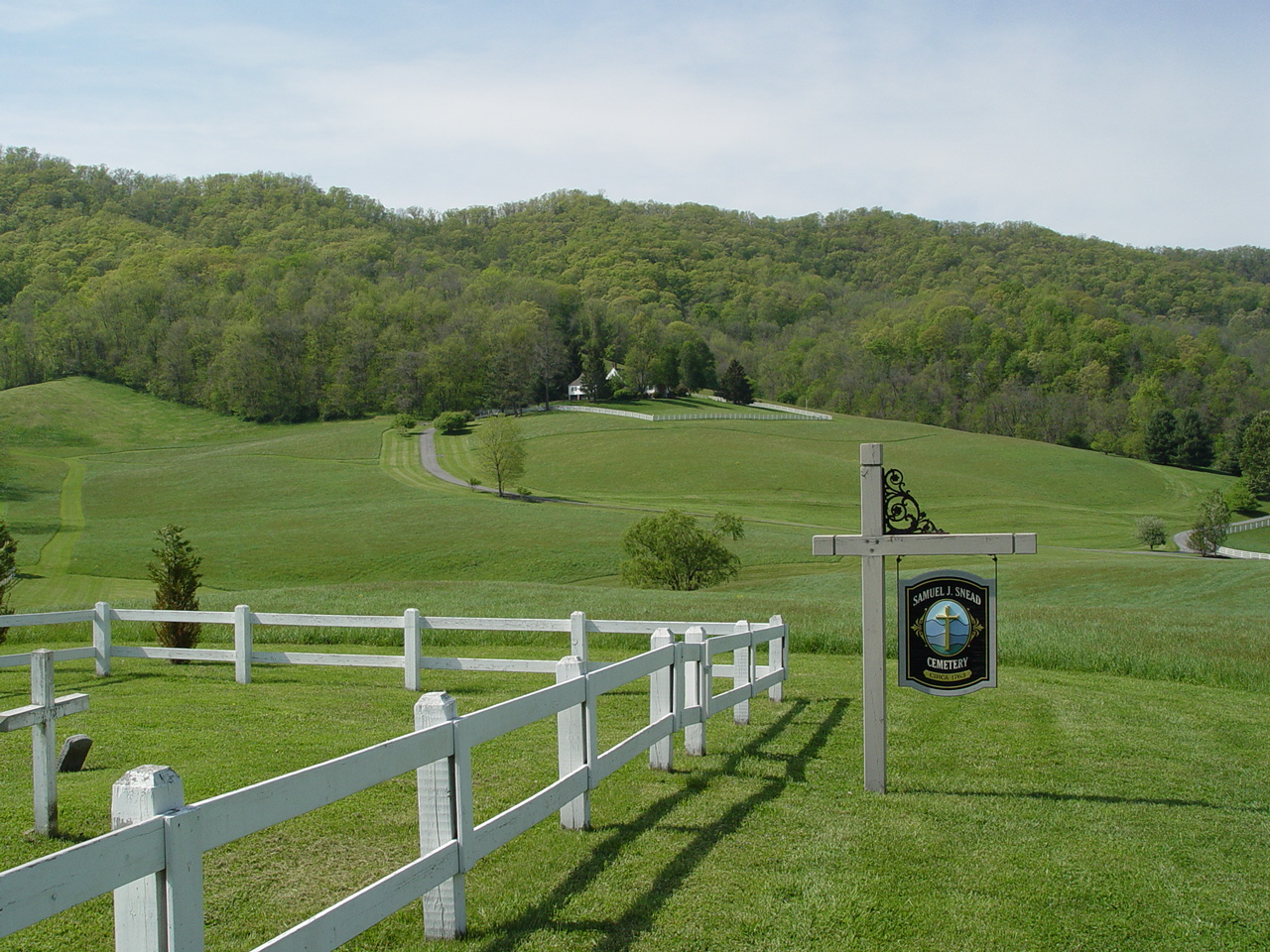
Snead's grave at his house in Hot Springs

Snead died in Hot Springs, Virginia in 2002 following complications from a stroke, four days before his 90th birthday. He was survived by two sons: Sam Jr. of Hot Springs, and Terry, of Mountain Grove, Virginia, and a brother, Pete, of Pittsburgh, as well as two grandchildren. His wife Audrey died in 1990. His nephew J. C. Snead was also a PGA Tour golfer.

== In popular culture ==
Snead was mentioned several times in the comic strip Peanuts at the height of his popularity during the 1950s and 1960s. As its creator and avid golfer Charles M. Schulz said in a 1971 interview: "I was a great admirer of Sam Snead. I once watched him play a round in the St. Paul tournament when he hit every green in regulation figures – and all the par fives in two – for a truly flawless round."

He played himself in the 1951 Ben Hogan semi-autobiographical movie starring Glenn Ford and Anne Baxter called Follow the Sun.

There is a Sam Snead Street in San Antonio, Texas.

There is also a Sam Snead Dr in on the east side of El Paso, Texas.

== Awards ==
Snead was the PGA leading money winner in 1938, 1949 and 1950. He won the Vardon Trophy, for lowest scoring average, four times: 1938, 1949, 1950, and 1955. In 1949, he was PGA Golfer of the Year.

Snead was inducted into the Virginia Sports Hall of Fame in 1973. In 1986, Snead was inducted into the Middle Atlantic PGA Hall of Fame. Snead was also inducted into the PGA of America Hall of Fame and the Helms Hall of Fame. Snead received the PGA Tour Lifetime Achievement Award in 1998. In 2009, Snead was inducted into the inaugural class of the West Virginia Golf Hall of Fame and in 2016, Snead was the unanimous top choice for inclusion in the Virginia Golf Hall of Fame's inaugural class.

== Playing style ==
During his peak years, Snead was an exceptionally long driver, particularly into the wind, with very good accuracy as well. He was a superb player with the long irons. Snead was also known for a very creative short game, pioneering the use of the sand wedge for short shots from grass. As he aged, he began to experiment with different putting styles. Snead pioneered croquet-style putting in the 1960s, where he straddled the ball with one leg on each side. The United States Golf Association banned this technique in 1968 by amending the old Rule 35–1, since, until that time, golfers had always faced the ball when striking. Snead then went to side-saddle putting, where he crouched and angled his feet towards the hole, and held the club with a split grip. He used that style for the rest of his career.

== Records ==
Snead holds the following records:

- Most PGA Tour victories: 82 (tied with Tiger Woods)
- Most PGA-sanctioned tour victories: 94
- Became the first player to win 17 times at an event: at the West Virginia Open (1936–1938, 1948, 1949, 1952, 1957, 1958, 1960, 1961, 1966–1968, 1970–1973)
- First player to win an event in six different decades (1930s–1980s).
- Became the first player to win 8 times at an event: at the Greater Greensboro Open (1938, 1946, 1949, 1950, 1955, 1956, 1960, 1965)
- First player to be credited with winning a PGA Tour event in four different decades.
- Oldest player to be credited with winning a PGA Tour event: age 52 years, 10 months, 8 days at the 1965 Greater Greensboro Open
- Oldest player to make the cut at a major: age 67 years, 2 months, 7 days at the 1979 PGA Championship
- First PGA Tour player to shoot his age: 67 in the second round of the 1979 Quad Cities Open
- Oldest player to make a cut on the PGA Tour: age 67 years, 2 months, 21 days at the 1979 Manufacturers Hanover Westchester Classic.
- Only player to post a top-10 finish in at least one major championship in five different decades.
- Became the first player to win PGA and Senior PGA Tour events over six decades (1930s–1980s)

== Professional wins (143) ==
=== PGA Tour wins (82) ===
Legend
Major championships (7)
Other PGA Tour (75)

No.	Date	Tournament	Winning score	Margin of victory	Runner(s)-up
1	Jul 10, 1936	West Virginia Closed Pro	−9 (70-61=131)	16 strokes	(United States) Clem Wiechman
2	Jan 17, 1937	Oakland Open	−2 (69-65-69-67=270)	2 strokes	(United States) Ralph Guldahl
3	Feb 7, 1937	Bing Crosby Pro-Am	−4 (68)*	4 strokes	(United States) George Von Elm
4	Aug 1, 1937	St. Paul Open	−5 (72-69-71-71=283)	1 stroke	(United States) Willie Goggin
5	Dec 20, 1937	Nassau Open	−4 (66-70-70-70=276)	1 stroke	(United States) Vic Ghezzi
6	Dec 25, 1937	Miami Open	−13 (68-67-66-66=267)	5 strokes	(United States) Ralph Guldahl, (United States) Horton Smith
7	Jan 17, 1938	Bing Crosby Pro-Am (2)	−5 (72-67=139)	2 strokes	(United States) Jimmy Hines
8	Mar 28, 1938	Greater Greensboro Open	−11 (66-68-69-68=271)	5 strokes	(United States) Johnny Revolta
9	May 29, 1938	Inverness Invitational Four-Ball (with (United States) Vic Ghezzi)	+9 points	1 point	(England) Harry Cooper and (United States) Horton Smith, (United States) Ed Dudley and (United States) Ky Laffoon
10	Jun 26, 1938	Palm Beach Round Robin	+14 points	Playoff	(United States) Gene Sarazen
11	Jul 24, 1938	Chicago Open	−3 (64-73-70=207)*	1 stroke	(United States) Ralph Guldahl
12	Aug 22, 1938	Canadian Open	−11 (69-67-69-72=277)	Playoff	(England) Harry Cooper
13	Sep 27, 1938	Westchester 108 Hole Open	+10 (73-72-73-72-71-69=430)	2 strokes	(United States) Billy Burke
14	Nov 10, 1938	White Sulphur Springs Open	−7 (68-68-69-68=273)	2 strokes	(United States) Ky Laffoon
15	Mar 3, 1939	St. Petersburg Open	−9 (70-69-68=207)	Playoff	(United States) Henry Picard
16	Mar 8, 1939	Miami Biltmore International Four-Ball (with (United States) Ralph Guldahl)	7 and 6		(United States) Paul Runyan and (United States) Horton Smith
17	Dec 17, 1939	Miami Open (2)	−12 (68-72-67-64=271)	2 strokes	(United States) Jug McSpaden
18	Jun 16, 1940	Inverness Invitational Four-Ball (2) (with (United States) Ralph Guldahl)	+15 points	3 points	(United States) Jimmy Demaret and (United States) Dick Metz
19	Aug 19, 1940	Canadian Open (2)	−3 (67-66-75-73=281)	Playoff	(United States) Jug McSpaden
20	Sep 8, 1940	Anthracite Open	−4 (65-73-68-70=276)	2 strokes	(United States) Byron Nelson
21	Jan 25, 1941	Bing Crosby Pro-Am (3)	−8 (67-69=136)	1 stroke	(United States) Craig Wood
22	Feb 28, 1941	St. Petersburg Open (2)	−5 (67-72-68-72=279)	2 strokes	(United States) Herman Barron, (United States) Chick Harbert, (United States) Ben Hogan, (United States) Jug McSpaden
23	Mar 20, 1941	North and South Open	−11 (69-66-73-69=277)	3 strokes	(United States) Clayton Heafner
24	Aug 9, 1941	Canadian Open (3)	−6 (71-68-66-69=274)	2 strokes	(Canada) Bob Gray
25	Aug 17, 1941	Rochester Times-Union Open	−3 (67-70-73-67=277)	7 strokes	(United States) Ben Hogan
26	Sep 21, 1941	Henry Hurst Invitational	−8 (64-74-69-65=272)	9 strokes	(United States) Dick Metz
27	Mar 6, 1942	St. Petersburg Open (3)	−2 (70-74-73-72=286)	3 strokes	(United States) Sam Byrd, (United States) Chick Harbert, (United States) Byron Nelson
28	May 31, 1942	PGA Championship	2 and 1		(United States) Jim Turnesa
29	Nov 26, 1944	Portland Open	+1 (70-74-73-72=289)	2 strokes	(United States) Mike Turnesa
30	Dec 17, 1944	Richmond Open	−6 (70-69-69-70=278)	1 stroke	(United States) Charles Congdon
31	Jan 8, 1945	Los Angeles Open	−1 (71-71-72-69=283)	1 stroke	(United States) Jug McSpaden, (United States) Byron Nelson
32	Feb 19, 1945	Gulfport Open	−9 (65-71-70-69=275)	Playoff	(United States) Byron Nelson
33	Feb 25, 1945	Pensacola Open	−21 (67-64-68-68=267)	7 strokes	(United States) Byron Nelson
34	Mar 4, 1945	Jacksonville Open	−22 (69-65-66-66=266)	4 strokes	(United States) Bob Hamilton
35	Sep 9, 1945	Dallas Open	−12 (70-69-69-68=276)	4 strokes	(United States) Jug McSpaden
36	Sep 16, 1945	Southwestern Invitational	−7 (68-67-69-73=277)	9 strokes	(United States) Vic Ghezzi, (United States) Ben Hogan
37	Mar 17, 1946	Jacksonville Open (2)	−24 (64-66-67-67=264)	4 strokes	(United States) Jimmy Demaret
38	Mar 24, 1946	Greater Greensboro Open (2)	−10 (70-67-67-66=270)	6 strokes	(United States) Herman Keiser
39	Apr 21, 1946	Virginia Open	−1 (69-66-68-72=275)	Playoff	(United States) Chandler Harper
40	Jul 5, 1946	The Open Championship	−2 (71-70-74-75=290)	4 strokes	(United States) Johnny Bulla, (South Africa) Bobby Locke
41	Sep 8, 1946	World Championship of Golf	−6 (69-69=138)	2 strokes	(United States) Byron Nelson
42	Dec 8, 1946	Miami Open (3)	−12 (65-66-66-71=268)	3 strokes	(United States) Clayton Heafner
43	Feb 8, 1948	Texas Open	−20 (66-65-65-68=264)	2 strokes	(United States) Jimmy Demaret
44	Mar 28, 1949	Greater Greensboro Open (3)	−8 (68-69-69-70=276)	Playoff	(United States) Lloyd Mangrum
45	Apr 10, 1949	Masters Tournament	−6 (73-75-67-67=282)	3 strokes	(United States) Johnny Bulla, (United States) Lloyd Mangrum
46	May 31, 1949	PGA Championship (2)	3 and 2		(United States) Johnny Palmer
47	Jul 4, 1949	Washington Star Open	−16 (69-64-69-70=272)	2 strokes	(United States) Cary Middlecoff
48	Jul 18, 1949	Dapper Dan Open	−16 (67-67-69-71=272)	1 stroke	(United States) Lloyd Mangrum
49	Jul 31, 1949	Western Open	−20 (69-67-65-67=268)	4 strokes	(United States) Cary Middlecoff
50	Jan 15, 1950	Bing Crosby Pro-Am (4)	−2 (69-72-73=214)	Shared title with (United States) Jack Burke Jr., (United States) Dave Douglas and (United States) Smiley Quick	
51	Jan 18, 1950	Los Angeles Open (2)	−4 (71-72-71-66=280)	Playoff	(United States) Ben Hogan
52	Feb 12, 1950	Texas Open (2)	−19 (71-68-63-63=265)	1 stroke	(United States) Jimmy Demaret
53	Mar 12, 1950	Miami Beach Open	−15 (71-66-65-71=273)	3 strokes	(United States) Lawson Little
54	Mar 26, 1950	Greater Greensboro Open (4)	−11 (66-70-66-67=269)	10 strokes	(United States) Jimmy Demaret
55	May 21, 1950	Western Open (2)	−2 (69-71-69-73=282)	1 stroke	(Australia) Jim Ferrier, (United States) Dutch Harrison
56	May 28, 1950	Colonial National Invitation	−3 (66-72-66-73=277)	3 strokes	(United States) Skip Alexander
57	Jul 16, 1950	Inverness Invitational Four-Ball (3) (with (Australia) Jim Ferrier)	+18 points	13 points	(United States) Fred Haas and (United States) Fred Hawkins
58	Sep 10, 1950	Reading Open	−20 (68-65-65-70=268)	8 strokes	(Australia) Jim Ferrier
59	Nov 3, 1950	North and South Open (2)	−13 (68-71-66-70=275)	4 strokes	(United States) Johnny Palmer
60	Dec 3, 1950	Miami Open (4)	−13 (69-66-66-66=267)	5 strokes	(United States) Jack Burke Jr., (United States) Dick Mayer
61	Jul 3, 1951	PGA Championship (3)	7 and 6		(United States) Walter Burkemo
62	Dec 9, 1951	Miami Open (5)	−12 (64-68-68-68=268)	5 strokes	(United States) Chandler Harper, (United States) Dutch Harrison
63	Apr 6, 1952	Masters Tournament (2)	−2 (70-67-77-72=286)	4 strokes	(United States) Jack Burke Jr.
64	May 18, 1952	Palm Beach Round Robin (2)	+57 points	2 points	(United States) Cary Middlecoff
65	Jun 29, 1952	Inverness Invitational Four-Ball (4) (with (Australia) Jim Ferrier)	+13 points	12 points	(United States) Doug Ford and (United States) Ed Oliver
66	Aug 3, 1952	All American Open	−17 (67-65-74-65=271)	8 strokes	(United States) Tommy Bolt
67	Sep 14, 1952	Eastern Open	−13 (71-67-68-69=275)	2 strokes	(United States) Ed Oliver
68	Mar 8, 1953	Baton Rouge Open	−13 (69-68-67-71=275)	3 strokes	(United States) Dick Mayer
69	Apr 12, 1954	Masters Tournament (3)	+1 (74-73-70-72=289)	Playoff	(United States) Ben Hogan
70	May 16, 1954	Palm Beach Round Robin (3)	+62 points	36 points	(United States) Bob Toski
71	Apr 17, 1955	Greater Greensboro Open (5)	−7 (68-67-69-69=273)	1 stroke	(United States) Julius Boros, (United States) Art Wall Jr.
72	Jun 5, 1955	Palm Beach Round Robin (4)	+46 points	24 points	(United States) Johnny Palmer
73	Sep 5, 1955	Insurance City Open	−15 (66-68-66-69=269)	7 strokes	(United States) Fred Hawkins, (United States) Mike Souchak
74	Dec 11, 1955	Miami Open (6)	−9 (70-67-64=201)*	Playoff	(United States) Tommy Bolt
75	Apr 15, 1956	Greater Greensboro Open (6)	−5 (66-69-74-70=279)	Playoff	(United States) Fred Wampler
76	Jun 2, 1957	Palm Beach Round Robin (5)	+41 points	8 points	(United States) Doug Ford
77	Sep 16, 1957	Dallas Open Invitational (2)	−20 (70-60-66-68=264)	10 strokes	(United States) Bob Inman, (United States) Billy Maxwell, (United States) Cary Middlecoff
78	Jun 8, 1958	Dallas Open Invitational (3)	−8 (67-67-69-69=272)	Playoff	(United States) Julius Boros, (United States) John McMullin, (South Africa) Gary Player
79	Mar 27, 1960	De Soto Open Invitational	−8 (69-72-67-68=276)	1 stroke	(United States) Jerry Barber
80	Apr 17, 1960	Greater Greensboro Open (7)	−14 (68-66-67-69=270)	2 strokes	(United States) Dow Finsterwald
81	May 7, 1961	Tournament of Champions	−15 (68-67-69-69=273)	7 strokes	(United States) Tommy Bolt
82	Apr 4, 1965	Greater Greensboro Open (8)	−11 (68-69-68-68=273)	5 strokes	(United States) Billy Casper, (United States) Jack McGowan, (United States) Phil Rodgers

*Note: Tournament shortened to 18/54 holes due to weather.

PGA Tour playoff record (12–6)

No.	Year	Tournament	Opponent(s)	Result
1	1938	Palm Beach Round Robin	(United States) Gene Sarazen	Won with birdie on the second extra hole
2	1938	Canadian Open	(England) Harry Cooper	Won 27-hole playoff; Snead: −7 (67-34=101), Cooper: −2 (67-39=106)
3	1939	St. Petersburg Open	(United States) Henry Picard	Won with birdie on seventh extra hole after 18-hole playoff; Snead: −3 (69), Picard: −3 (69)
4	1940	Canadian Open	(United States) Jug McSpaden	Won 18-hole playoff; Snead: E (71), McSpaden: +1 (72)
5	1945	Gulfport Open	(United States) Byron Nelson	Won with par on first extra after 18-hole playoff; Snead: E (71), Nelson: E (71)
6	1945	Charlotte Open	(United States) Byron Nelson	Lost second 18-hole playoff; Nelson: −3 (69), Snead: +1 (73); Level after first 18-hole playoff; Nelson: −3 (69), Snead: −3 (69)
7	1946	Virginia Open	(United States) Chandler Harper	Won 18-hole playoff; Snead: −5 (64), Harper: −2 (67)
8	1947	U.S. Open	(United States) Lew Worsham	Lost 18-hole playoff; Worsham: −2 (69), Snead: −1 (70)
9	1949	Greater Greensboro Open	(United States) Lloyd Mangrum	Won 18-hole playoff; Snead: −2 (69), Mangrum: E (71)
10	1950	Los Angeles Open	(United States) Ben Hogan	Won 18-hole playoff; Snead: +1 (72), Hogan: +5 (76)
11	1950	St. Paul Open	(Australia) Jim Ferrier	Lost to par on third extra hole after 18-hole playoff; Ferrier: −3 (69), Hogan: −3 (69)
12	1952	Jacksonville Open	(United States) Doug Ford	Lost after concession before playoff
13	1953	Greater Greensboro Open	(United States) Doug Ford, (United States) Earl Stewart, (United States) Art Wall Jr.	Stewart won with a par on the first extra hole after an 18-hole playoff; Stewart: −2 (68), Snead: −2 (68), Ford: E (70), Wall: +2 (72)
14	1954	Masters Tournament	(United States) Ben Hogan	Won 18-hole playoff; Snead: −2 (70), Hogan: −1 (71)
15	1955	Miami Open	(United States) Tommy Bolt	Won with a par on the first extra hole
16	1956	Greater Greensboro Open	(United States) Fred Wampler	Won with birdie on the second extra hole
17	1958	Dallas Open Invitational	(United States) Julius Boros, (United States) John McMullin, (South Africa) Gary Player	Won with birdie on the first extra hole
18	1958	Havana International	(United States) George Bayer	Lost to par on the first extra hole

=== LPGA Tour wins (1) ===
No.	Date	Tournament	Winning score	Margin of victory	Runner-up
1	Feb 7, 1962	Royal Poinciana Plaza Invitational	−5 (52-53-53-53=211)	5 strokes	(United States) Mickey Wright

=== Other wins (46) ===
- 1936 West Virginia Open
- 1937 West Virginia Open
- 1938 West Virginia Open
- 1940 Ontario Open (Canada)
- 1941 Center Open (Argentina)
- 1941 St Augustine Pro-am (with Wilford Wehrle)
- 1942 St Augustine Pro-am (with Wilford Wehrle)
- 1946 Southern Pines Open
- 1948 West Virginia Open, Havana Invitational
- 1949 North and South Open, West Virginia Open, National Celebrities Open
- 1951 Greenbrier Pro-Am
- 1952 West Virginia Open, Brazil Open, Greenbrier Pro-Am, Julius Boros Open, Seminole Pro-am
- 1953 Greenbrier Pro-Am, Orlando International Mixed Best Ball (with Betty MacKinnon)
- 1954 Panama Open
- 1955 McNaughtons Pro-am
- 1956 Canada Cup (with Ben Hogan), Boca Raton Open
- 1957 West Virginia Open
- 1958 West Virginia Open, Greenbrier Invitational
- 1959 Sam Snead Festival, Eldorado Professional (tied with Doug Ford)
- 1960 West Virginia Open, Canada Cup (with Arnold Palmer)
- 1961 West Virginia Open, Sam Snead Festival, Canada Cup (with Jimmy Demaret), Canada Cup – International Trophy
- 1962 Canada Cup (with Arnold Palmer)
- 1964 Haig & Haig Scotch Foursome (with Shirley Englehorn)
- 1966 West Virginia Open
- 1967 West Virginia Open
- 1968 West Virginia Open
- 1970 West Virginia Open
- 1971 PGA Club Professional Championship, West Virginia Open
- 1972 West Virginia Open
- 1973 West Virginia Open

Note: this list is incomplete.

=== Senior wins (14) ===
- 1964 PGA Seniors' Championship, World Senior Championship
- 1965 PGA Seniors' Championship, World Senior Championship
- 1967 PGA Seniors' Championship
- 1970 PGA Seniors' Championship, World Senior Championship
- 1972 PGA Seniors' Championship, World Senior Championship
- 1973 PGA Seniors' Championship, World Senior Championship
- 1978 Legends of Golf (with Gardner Dickinson)
- 1980 Golf Digest Commemorative Pro-Am
- 1982 Liberty Mutual Legends of Golf (with Don January)

== Major championships ==
=== Wins (7) ===
Year	Championship	54 holes	Winning score	Margin	Runner(s)-up
1942	PGA Championship	n/a	2 & 1		(United States) Jim Turnesa
1946	The Open Championship	Tied for lead	−2 (71-70-74-75=290)	4 strokes	(United States) Johnny Bulla, (South Africa) Bobby Locke
1949	Masters Tournament	1 shot deficit	−6 (73-75-67-67=282)	3 strokes	(United States) Johnny Bulla, (United States) Lloyd Mangrum
1949	PGA Championship (2)	n/a	3 & 2		(United States) Johnny Palmer
1951	PGA Championship (3)	n/a	7 & 6		(United States) Walter Burkemo
1952	Masters Tournament (2)	Tied for lead	−2 (70-67-77-72=286)	4 strokes	(United States) Jack Burke Jr.
1954	Masters Tournament (3)	3 shot deficit	+1 (74-73-70-72=289)	Playoff^{1}	(United States) Ben Hogan

Note: The PGA Championship was match play until 1958.
^{1}Defeated Ben Hogan in 18-hole playoff – Snead 70 (−2), Hogan 71 (−1).

=== Results timeline ===
Tournament	1937	1938	1939
Masters Tournament	18	T31	2
U.S. Open	2	T38	5
The Open Championship	T11		
PGA Championship	R16	2	

Tournament	1940	1941	1942	1943	1944	1945	1946	1947	1948	1949
Masters Tournament	T7	T6	T7	NT	NT	NT	T7	T22	T16	1
U.S. Open	T16	T13	NT	NT	NT	NT	T19	2	5	T2
The Open Championship	NT	NT	NT	NT	NT	NT	1			
PGA Championship	2	QF	1	NT			R32	R32	QF	1

Tournament	1950	1951	1952	1953	1954	1955	1956	1957	1958	1959
Masters Tournament	3	T8	1	T16	1	3	T4	2	13	T22
U.S. Open	T12	T10	T10	2	T11	T3	T24	T8	CUT	T8
The Open Championship										
PGA Championship	R32	1	R64	R32	QF	R32	QF	R16	3	T8

Tournament	1960	1961	1962	1963	1964	1965	1966	1967	1968	1969
Masters Tournament	T11	T15	T15	T3	CUT	CUT	T42	T10	42	CUT
U.S. Open	T19	T17	T38	T42	T34	T24			T9	T38
The Open Championship			T6			CUT				
PGA Championship	T3	T27	T17	T27		T6	T6		T34	T63

Tournament	1970	1971	1972	1973	1974	1975	1976	1977	1978	1979
Masters Tournament	T23	CUT	T27	T29	T20	WD	CUT	WD	CUT	CUT
U.S. Open	CUT			T29		CUT		CUT		
The Open Championship							CUT			
PGA Championship	T12	T34	T4	T9	T3	CUT	CUT	T54		T42

Tournament	1980	1981	1982	1983
Masters Tournament	CUT	CUT	WD	WD
U.S. Open				
The Open Championship				
PGA Championship	WD	WD		

Win
Top 10
Did not play

NT = no tournament
WD = withdrew
CUT = missed the half-way cut
"T" indicates a tie for a place
R64, R32, R16, QF, SF = Round in which player lost in PGA Championship match play

=== Summary ===
Tournament	Wins	2nd	3rd	Top-5	Top-10	Top-25	Events	Cuts made
Masters Tournament	3	2	3	9	15	26	44	31
U.S. Open	0	4	1	7	12	21	31	27
The Open Championship	1	0	0	1	2	3	5	3
PGA Championship	3	2	3	13	19	26	38	34
Totals	7	8	7	30	48	76	118	95

- Most consecutive cuts made – 55 (1937 Masters – 1958 Masters)
- Longest streak of top-10s – 6 (1948 U.S. Open – 1950 Masters)

== U.S. national team appearances ==
Professional

- Ryder Cup: 1937 (winners), 1947 (winners), 1949 (winners), 1951 (winners, playing captain), 1953 (winners), 1955 (winners), 1959 (winners, playing captain), 1969 (tied, non-playing captain)
- Canada Cup: 1954, 1956 (winners), 1957, 1958, 1959, 1960 (winners), 1961 (winners, individual winner), 1962 (winners)

== See also ==
- List of golfers with most PGA Tour wins
- List of golfers with most wins in one PGA Tour event
- List of men's major championships winning golfers
- Most PGA Tour wins in a year
