= Dutch Harrison =

Professional golfer

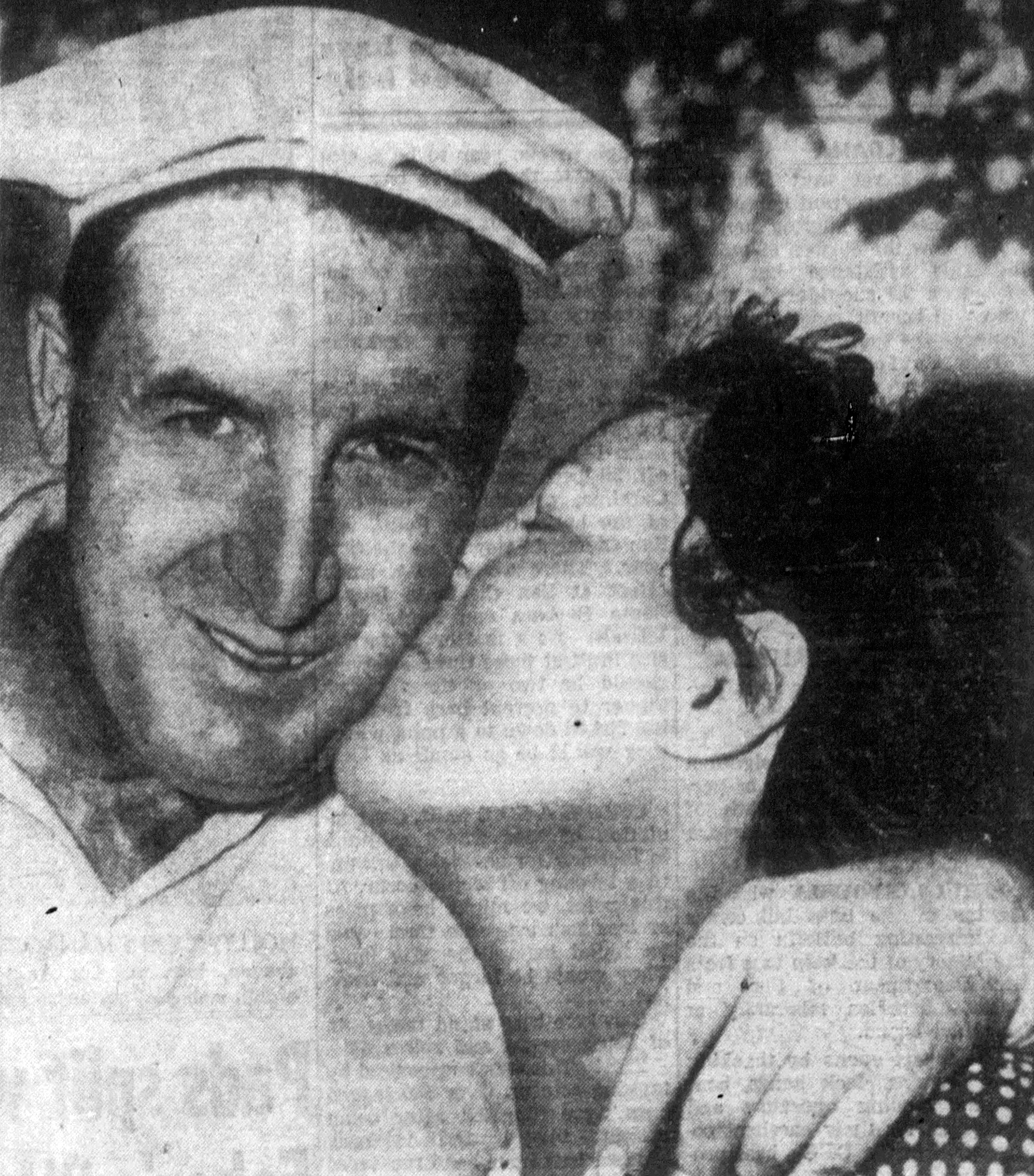
- Dutch and Thelma Harrison, 1953

Personal information
- Full name: Ernest Joseph Harrison
- Nickname: Dutch
- Nationality: United States
- Born: March 29, 1910 Conway, Arkansas, U.S.
- Died: June 19, 1982 (aged 72) St. Louis, Missouri, U.S.
- Spouse: Thelma Akana Harrison (m. 1950; died 1972)

Career
- Sport: Golf
- Turned professional: 1930
- Former tour: PGA Tour
- Professional wins: 26

Number of wins by tour
- PGA Tour: 18
- Other: 8

Best results in major championships
- Masters Tournament: T4: 1954
- PGA Championship: T3: 1939
- U.S. Open: T3: 1960
- The Open Championship: DNP

Achievements and awards
- Vardon Trophy: 1954

Ernest Joseph "Dutch" Harrison (March 29, 1910 – June 19, 1982) was an American professional golfer whose career spanned over four decades—one of the longest in the history of the PGA Tour.

== Career ==
In 1910, Harrison was born in Conway, Arkansas. He was nicknamed "The Arkansas Traveler."

In 1930, Harrison turned pro at the start of the Great Depression. Although he played in what tournaments existed in those days, the mainstay of his income was the many exhibitions and private "money" matches in which he, as well as many of his fellow professionals, played.

Harrison had a total of 18 career PGA Tour victories spanning from the 1939 Bing Crosby Pro-Am to the 1958 Tijuana Open Invitational. However, as late as 1969, Harrison had a top-25 finish in the Canadian Open at the age of 59. He played on three Ryder Cup teams: 1947, 1949, and 1951.

Harrison finished nine times in the top-10 at major championships, including third place finishes at the 1939 PGA Championship and the 1960 U.S. Open. He won the Vardon Trophy for lowest scoring average in 1954 and ranks fifth on the list of players with the most PGA Tour victories without a major championship on his resume.

In 1954, Harrison became the Old Warson Country Club's first golf professional.

== Personal life ==
Harrison was married to the well-known public health advocate and politician Thelma Akana Harrison.

In 1982, Harrison died of heart failure at the age of 72 in St. Louis, Missouri.

== Professional wins (26) ==
=== PGA Tour wins (18) ===
- 1939 (2) Bing Crosby Pro-Am, Texas Open
- 1944 (2) Charlotte Open, Miami Open
- 1945 (1) St. Paul Open
- 1947 (3) Reno Open, Reading Open, Hawaiian Open
- 1948 (1) Richmond Open
- 1949 (1) Canadian Open
- 1950 (1) Wilmington Open
- 1951 (1) Texas Open
- 1953 (3) St. Petersburg Open, Western Open, Columbia Open
- 1954 (1) Bing Crosby Pro-Am Invitational
- 1956 (1) All American Open
- 1958 (1) Tijuana Open Invitational

=== Other wins (8) ===
- 1940 Illinois PGA Championship
- 1942 Illinois PGA Championship
- 1950 California State Open
- 1952 Northern California Open, Ampol Tournament (Oct), Havana Invitational
- 1955 White Sulphur Springs Open
- 1957 Greenbrier Invitational

== Results in major championships ==
Tournament	1936	1937	1938	1939
Masters Tournament				
U.S. Open	T36	T32		T25
PGA Championship				SF

Tournament	1940	1941	1942	1943	1944	1945	1946	1947	1948	1949
Masters Tournament	T31		T7	NT	NT	NT	T37	T29	T13	T23
U.S. Open	DQ	T7	NT	NT	NT	NT	T10	T13	T35	CUT
PGA Championship	R64	R64	R64	NT		R64	R16		R64	

Tournament	1950	1951	1952	1953	1954	1955	1956	1957	1958	1959
Masters Tournament	WD	T15			T4			CUT		
U.S. Open	4	T47	T33	T14			T17	CUT	T23	
PGA Championship			R64	R64	R16	R64				

Tournament	1960	1961	1962	1963	1964	1965	1966	1967	1968	1969
Masters Tournament		WD							CUT	
U.S. Open	T3	T17			CUT	T28		T16	CUT	
PGA Championship				T49						

Tournament	1970	1971
Masters Tournament		
U.S. Open		CUT
PGA Championship		

Note: Harrison never played in The Open Championship.

Top 10
Did not play

NT = no tournament
WD = withdrew
DQ = disqualified
CUT = missed the half-way cut
R64, R32, R16, QF, SF = Round in which player lost in PGA Championship match play
"T" indicates a tie for a place

=== Summary ===
Tournament	Wins	2nd	3rd	Top-5	Top-10	Top-25	Events	Cuts made
Masters Tournament	0	0	0	1	2	5	12	8
U.S. Open	0	0	1	2	4	11	23	17
The Open Championship	0	0	0	0	0	0	0	0
PGA Championship	0	0	1	1	3	3	12	12
Totals	0	0	2	4	9	19	47	37

- Most consecutive cuts made – 10 (1940 PGA – 1949 Masters)
- Longest streak of top-10s – 2 (twice)

== U.S. national team appearances ==
- Ryder Cup: 1947 (winners), 1949 (winners), 1951 (winners)
- Lakes International Cup: 1954 (winners)

== See also ==
- List of golfers with most PGA Tour wins
