= 1937 Masters Tournament =

Tournament information
- Dates: April 1–4, 1937
- Location: Augusta, Georgia; 33.503°N 82.020°W
- Course: Augusta National Golf Club
- Organized by: Augusta National Golf Club
- Tour: PGA Tour

Statistics
- Par: 72
- Field: 46 players
- Cut: None
- Prize fund: $5,000
- Winner's share: $1,500

Champion
- (United States) Byron Nelson
- 283 (−5)

Location map
- Location in the United States Location in Georgia

The 1937 Masters Tournament was the fourth Masters Tournament, held April 1–4 at Augusta National Golf Club in Augusta, Georgia. The tournament was at this point still officially named the Augusta National Invitation Tournament, and would not officially adopt the Masters Tournament name until 1939.

Opening with a six-under 66, Byron Nelson led after the first and second rounds, but a 75 on Saturday dropped him four strokes back, in a tie for third. On the final nine on Sunday, he gained six strokes on third round leader Ralph Guldahl over two holes and won the tournament by two strokes. Compared to Guldahl's 5–6 (double bogey, bogey), Nelson played the 12th and 13th holes 2–3 (birdie, eagle), respectively. The Nelson Bridge, over Rae's Creek departing the 13th tee, was dedicated in 1958 to commemorate the feat.

At age 25, this was the first of Nelson's five major titles; he won the Masters again in 1942, which was not held again until 1946. Guldahl rebounded and won three majors over the next two years: the U.S. Open in 1937 and 1938 and the Masters in 1939.

Sam Snead made his Masters debut and finished 18th. The purse was $5,000 with a winner's share of $1,500.

== Field ==
1. Masters champions

Gene Sarazen (2,4,6,7,9,10), Horton Smith (7,9,10,12)

2. U.S. Open champions

Tommy Armour (4,6,9,10), Billy Burke (9,10), Bobby Jones (3,4,5), Willie Macfarlane, Tony Manero (10,12), Sam Parks Jr. (7,9), George Sargent

3. U.S. Amateur champions

Lawson Little (5,9), Jess Sweetser (5,a)

4. British Open champions

Jock Hutchison (6), Denny Shute (6,9,10,12)

5. British Amateur champions

6. PGA champions

Johnny Revolta (7,9,10), Paul Runyan (7,9,10)

7. Members of the U.S. 1935 Ryder Cup team

Ky Laffoon (9,10), Henry Picard (9,10), Craig Wood (9,12)

- Olin Dutra (2,6) and Walter Hagen (2,4,6,9) did not play.

8. Members of the U.S. 1936 Walker Cup team

Charlie Yates (a)

- Albert Campbell (9,11,a), George Dunlap (a), Walter Emery (a), Johnny Fischer (11,a), Harry Givan (a), Johnny Goodman (10,11,a), Francis Ouimet (a), Reynolds Smith (a), George Voigt (11,a) and Ed White (a) did not play.

9. Top 30 players and ties from the 1936 Masters Tournament

Harry Cooper (10), Wiffy Cox (10), Bobby Cruickshank, Ed Dudley, Al Espinosa, Vic Ghezzi (110, Ray Mangrum (10), Jug McSpaden (10,12), Byron Nelson, Jimmy Thomson (10,12), Al Watrous

- Johnny Dawson (a), Johnny Farrell (2,10), Dick Metz (10) and Orville White did not play.

10. Top 30 players and ties from the 1936 U.S. Open

Herman Barron, Al Brosch, Clarence Clark, Ralph Guldahl, Tom Kerrigan, Chuck Kocsis (a), Frank Moore, Jack Munger (a), Felix Serafin

- Zell Eaton, Jerry Gianferante, Willie Goggin and Macdonald Smith did not play

11. 1936 U.S. Amateur quarter-finalists

John Riddell (a)

- Ray Billows (a) and Russell Martin (a) did not play.

12. 1936 PGA Championship quarter-finalists

Jimmy Hines, Bill Mehlhorn

13. Two players, not already qualified, with the best scoring average in the winter part of the 1937 PGA Tour

Leonard Dodson, Sam Snead

14 Foreign invitations

Francis Francis (a)

Additional invitation

Fred Haas (a) winner of 1936 Canadian Amateur Championship

== Round summaries ==
=== First round ===
Thursday, April 1, 1937

Place	Player	Score	To par
1	(United States) Byron Nelson	66	−6
2	(United States) Ralph Guldahl	69	−3
T3	(United States) Ed Dudley	70	−2
T3	(United States) Wiffy Cox	70	−2
T3	(United States) Lawson Little	70	−2
T6	(United States) Leonard Dodson	71	−1
T6	(United States) Tony Manero	71	−1
T6	(United States) Johnny Revolta	71	−1
T6	(United States) Jimmy Thomson	71	−1
T10	(United States) Vic Ghezzi	72	E
T10	(United States) Al Espinosa	72	E

=== Second round ===
Friday, April 2, 1937

Place	Player	Score	To par
1	(United States) Byron Nelson	66-72=138	−6
T2	(United States) Ralph Guldahl	69-72=141	−3
T2	(United States) Ed Dudley	70-71=141	−3
T4	(United States) Harry Cooper	73-69=142	−2
T4	(United States) Wiffy Cox	70-72=142	−2
T6	(United States) Ky Laffoon	73-70=143	−1
T6	(United States) Tony Manero	71-72=143	−1
T6	(United States) Johnny Revolta	71-72=143	−1
T9	(United States) Vic Ghezzi	72-72=144	E
T9	(United States) Jimmy Thomson	71-73=144	E

=== Third round ===
Saturday, April 3, 1937

Place	Player	Score	To par
1	(United States) Ralph Guldahl	69-72-68=209	−7
2	(United States) Ed Dudley	70-71-71=212	−4
T3	(United States) Harry Cooper	73-69-71=213	−3
T3	(United States) Byron Nelson	66-72-75=213	−3
5	(United States) Johnny Revolta	71-72-72=215	−1
6	(United States) Vic Ghezzi	72-72-72=216	E
T7	(United States) Leonard Dodson	71-75-71=217	+1
T7	(United States) Jimmy Hines	77-72-68=217	+1
T7	(United States) Ky Laffoon	73-70-74=217	+1
T7	(United States) Al Watrous	74-72-71=217	+1

=== Final round ===
Sunday, April 4, 1937

==== Final leaderboard ====
Champion
Silver Cup winner (low amateur)
(a) = amateur
(c) = past champion

Top 10
Place	Player	Score	To par	Money (US$)
1	(United States) Byron Nelson	66-72-75-70=283	−5	1,500
2	(United States) Ralph Guldahl	69-72-68-76=285	−3	800
3	(United States) Ed Dudley	70-71-71-74=286	−2	600
4	(United States) Harry Cooper	73-69-71-74=287	−1	500
5	(United States) Ky Laffoon	73-70-74-73=290	+2	400
6	(United States) Jimmy Thomson	71-73-74-73=291	+3	300
7	(United States) Al Watrous	74-72-71-75=292	+4	250
T8	(United States) Tommy Armour	73-75-73-72=293	+5	175
T8	(United States) Vic Ghezzi	72-72-72-77=293	+5	175
T10	(United States) Leonard Dodson	71-75-71-77=294	+6	100
T10	(United States) Jimmy Hines	77-72-68-77=294	+6	100

Leaderboard below the top 10
Place	Player	Score	To par	Money ($)
12	(United States) Wiffy Cox	70-72-77-76=295	+7	100
T13	(United States) Clarence Clark	77-75-70-74=296	+8	
T13	(United States) Tony Manero	71-72-78-75=296	+8	
T13	(United States) Johnny Revolta	71-72-72-81=296	+8	
T13	(United States) Denny Shute	74-75-71-76=296	+8	
17	(United States) Bobby Cruickshank	79-69-71-78=297	+9	
18	(United States) Sam Snead	76-72-71-79=298	+10	
T19	(United States) Lawson Little	70-79-74-76=299	+11	
T19	(United States) Willie Macfarlane	73-76-73-77=299	+11	
T19	(United States) Paul Runyan	74-77-72-76=299	+11	
T19	(United States) Felix Serafin	75-76-71-77=299	+11	
T19	(United States) Horton Smith (c)	75-72-77-75=299	+11	
T24	(United States) Ray Mangrum	71-80-72-77=300	+12	
T24	(United States) Gene Sarazen (c)	74-80-73-73=300	+12	
T26	(United States) Craig Wood	79-77-74-71=301	+13	
T26	(United States) Charlie Yates (a)	76-73-74-78=301	+13	
28	(England) Francis Francis (a)	77-74-75-76=302	+14	
T29	(United States) Billy Burke	77-71-75-80=303	+15	
T29	(United States) Al Espinosa	72-76-79-76=303	+15	
T29	(United States) Bobby Jones	79-74-73-77=303	+15	
32	(United States) Jug McSpaden	77-79-72-76=304	+16	
T33	(United States) Bill Mehlhorn	73-76-77-79=305	+17	
T33	(United States) Henry Picard	75-77-75-78=305	+17	
35	(United States) Chuck Kocsis (a)	76-72-77-82=307	+19	
T36	(United States) Al Brosch	78-79-74-77=308	+20	
T36	(United States) Tom Kerrigan	75-77-77-79=308	+20	
T36	(United States) Sam Parks Jr.	76-75-80-77=308	+20	
39	(United States) Frank Moore	73-79-76-82=310	+22	
40	(United States) Jess Sweetser (a)	75-80-85-79=319	+31	
41	(United States) John Riddell (a)	79-81-82-79=321	+33	
WD	(United States) Fred Haas (a)	78-70-78=226	+10	
WD	(United States) Jack Munger (a)	84-81-78=243	+27	
WD	(United States) Herman Barron	78-75=153	+9	
WD	(United States) Jock Hutchison	77-77=154	+10	
WD	(United States) George Sargent	76	+4	

==== Scorecard ====
Final round

Hole	1	2	3	4	5	6	7	8	9	10	11	12	13	14	15	16	17	18
Par	4	5	4	3	4	3	4	5	4	4	4	3	5	4	5	3	4	4
(United States) Nelson	−3	−3	−3	−3	−3	−2	−1	−1	−1	−2	−2	−3	−5	−5	−5	−5	−5	−5
(United States) Guldahl	−7	−7	−7	−7	−6	−7	−7	−6	−5	−6	−6	−4	−3	−3	−4	−4	−3	−3
(United States) Dudley	−4	−2	−2	−3	−3	−2	−2	−2	−1	−2	−2	−2	−2	−2	−3	−3	−3	−2
(United States) Cooper	−2	−2	−2	−2	−2	−2	−2	−1	E	E	E	E	−1	−1	−2	−2	−1	−1

Cumulative tournament scores, relative to par
