= 1940 Masters Tournament =

Tournament information
- Dates: April 4–7, 1940
- Location: Augusta, Georgia; 33.503°N 82.020°W
- Course: Augusta National Golf Club
- Organized by: Augusta National Golf Club
- Tour: PGA Tour

Statistics
- Par: 72
- Length: 6,800 yards (6,220 m)
- Field: 59 players
- Cut: none
- Prize fund: $5,000
- Winner's share: $1,500

Champion
- (United States) Jimmy Demaret
- 280 (−8)

Location map
- Location in the United States Location in Georgia

The 1940 Masters Tournament was the seventh Masters Tournament, held April 4–7 at Augusta National Golf Club in Augusta, Georgia.

Jimmy Demaret won the first of his three Masters titles, four strokes ahead of runner-up Lloyd Mangrum, the largest margin of victory until 1948. The purse was $5,000 and the winner's share was $1,500.

Mangrum shot an opening round 64 (−8), a new course record by two strokes, and it stood for 46 years, until Nick Price's 63 in 1986, later equaled by Greg Norman in 1996. Although all three of these players won major titles, none won a Masters.

== Field ==
1. Masters champions

Ralph Guldahl (2,9,10), Byron Nelson (2,9,10,12), Henry Picard (6,9,10,12), Gene Sarazen (2,4,6,9), Horton Smith (9,10,12)

2. U.S. Open champions

Tommy Armour (4,6,9,10), Billy Burke (9), Chick Evans (3,a), Johnny Farrell, Walter Hagen (4,6), Bobby Jones (3,4,5), Tony Manero (9), George Sargent

3. U.S. Amateur champions

Lawson Little (5,9)

4. British Open champions

5. British Amateur champions

Charlie Yates (8,9,a)

6. PGA champions

Johnny Revolta (10), Paul Runyan (9,10,12)

7. Members of the U.S. Ryder Cup team

- Not held

8. Members of the U.S. 1938 Walker Cup team

Ray Billows (11,a), Chuck Kocsis (a), Tommy Suffern Tailer (9,a), Bud Ward (10,11,a)

- Johnny Fischer (3,a), Johnny Goodman (2,3,5,a), Fred Haas (a) and Reynolds Smith (a) did not play. Tailer was a reserve for the team.

9. Top 30 players and ties from the 1939 Masters Tournament

Ed Dudley (10), Vic Ghezzi (10), Chick Harbert (a), Jimmy Hines (10), Ben Hogan, Ky Laffoon (10), Jug McSpaden (10), Frank Moore, Toney Penna, Felix Serafin (10), Sam Snead (10), Jimmy Thomson, Willie Turnesa (a), Frank Walsh, Al Watrous, Craig Wood (10)

- Denny Shute (4,6,10) and Jess Sweetser (3,5,a) did not play.

10. Top 30 players and ties from the 1939 U.S. Open

Johnny Bulla, Sammy Byrd, Harry Cooper, Bobby Cruickshank, Jimmy Demaret, Jim Foulis, Dutch Harrison (12), Clayton Heafner, Dick Metz (12), Ed Oliver, Wilford Wehrle (a)

- Olin Dutra (2,6), Matt Kowal and John Rogers did not play.

11. 1939 U.S. Amateur quarter-finalists

George Dawson (a), Art Doering (a)

- Harry Givan (a), Ed Kingsley (a) and Don Schumacher (a) did not play.

12. 1939 PGA Championship quarter-finalists

Rod Munday

- Emerick Kocsis did not play.

13. One amateur, not already qualified, selected by a ballot of ex-U.S. Amateur champions

Bill Holt (a)

14. One professional, not already qualified, selected by a ballot of ex-U.S. Open champions

- Macdonald Smith did not play.

15. Two players, not already qualified, with the best scoring average in the winter part of the 1940 PGA Tour

Willie Goggin, Lloyd Mangrum

16 Foreign invitations

Enrique Bertolino, Jim Ferrier (a), Jules Huot, Martin Pose, Robert Sweeny Jr. (a)

== Round summaries ==
=== First round ===
Thursday April 4, 1940

Place	Player	Score	To par
1	(United States) Lloyd Mangrum	64	−8
2	(United States) Jimmy Demaret	67	−5
T3	(United States) Harry Cooper	69	−3
T3	(United States) Byron Nelson	69	−3
T5	(United States) Lawson Little	70	−2
T5	(United States) Craig Wood	70	−2
T7	(United States) Tommy Armour	71	−1
T7	(United States) Willie Goggin	71	−1
T7	(United States) Jug McSpaden	71	−1
T7	(United States) Dick Metz	71	−1
T7	(United States) Henry Picard	71	−1
T7	(United States) Paul Runyan	71	−1
T7	(United States) Sam Snead	71	−1

==== Scorecard ====
First round, set course record 32-32=64 (−8), lasted until 1986

Hole	1	2	3	4	5	6	7	8	9	10	11	12	13	14	15	16	17	18
Par	4	5	4	3	4	3	4	5	4	4	4	3	5	4	5	3	4	4
(United States) Mangrum	E	−1	−2	−2	−2	−2	−2	−3	−4	−3	−3	−4	−5	−5	−6	−6	−7	−8

=== Second round ===
Friday April 5, 1940

Place	Player	Score	To par
T1	(United States) Jimmy Demaret	67-72=139	−5
T1	(United States) Lloyd Mangrum	64-75=139	−5
3	(United States) Byron Nelson	69-72=141	−3
4	(United States) Henry Picard	71-71=142	−2
T5	(United States) Willie Goggin	71-72=143	−1
T5	(United States) Sam Snead	71-72=143	−1
T7	(United States) Harry Cooper	69-75=144	E
T7	(United States) Jug McSpaden	73-71=144	E
T9	(United States) Tommy Armour	71-74=145	+1
T9	(United States) Ed Dudley	73-72=145	+1
T9	(United States) Dick Metz	71-74=145	+1
T9	(United States) Paul Runyan	72-73=145	+1
T9	(United States) Craig Wood	70-75=145	+1

=== Third round ===
Saturday April 6, 1940

Place	Player	Score	To par
1	(United States) Jimmy Demaret	67-72-70=209	−7
2	(United States) Lloyd Mangrum	64-75-71=210	−6
T3	(United States) Sam Snead	71-72-69=212	−4
T3	(United States) Craig Wood	70-75-67=212	−4
5	(United States) Henry Picard	71-71-71=213	−3
6	(United States) Byron Nelson	69-72-74=215	−1
T7	(United States) Ed Dudley	73-72-71=216	E
T7	(United States) Willie Goggin	71-72-73=216	E
T7	(United States) Ben Hogan	73-74-69=216	E
T10	(United States) Harry Cooper	69-75-73=217	+1
T10	(United States) Paul Runyan	72-73-72=217	+1

=== Final round ===
Sunday April 7, 1940

==== Final leaderboard ====
Champion
Silver Cup winner (low amateur)
(a) = amateur
(c) = past champion

Top 10
Place	Player	Score	To par	Money (US$)
1	(United States) Jimmy Demaret	67-72-70-71=280	−8	1,500
2	(United States) Lloyd Mangrum	64-75-71-74=284	−4	800
3	(United States) Byron Nelson (c)	69-72-74-70=285	−3	600
T4	(United States) Harry Cooper	69-75-73-70=287	−1	400
T4	(United States) Ed Dudley	73-72-71-71=287	−1	400
T4	(United States) Willie Goggin	71-72-73-71=287	−1	400
T7	(United States) Henry Picard (c)	71-71-71-75=288	E	200
T7	(United States) Sam Snead	71-72-69-76=288	E	200
T7	(United States) Craig Wood	70-75-67-76=288	E	200
T10	(United States) Ben Hogan	73-74-69-74=290	+2	100
T10	(United States) Toney Penna	73-73-72-72=290	+2	100

Leaderboard below the top 10
Place	Player	Score	To par	Money ($)
T12	(United States) Paul Runyan	72-73-72-74=291	+3	50
T12	(United States) Frank Walsh	73-75-69-74=291	+3	50
T14	(United States) Sammy Byrd	73-74-72-73=292	+4	
T14	(United States) Johnny Farrell	76-72-70-74=292	+4	
T14	(United States) Ralph Guldahl (c)	74-73-71-74=292	+4	
T17	(United States) Jug McSpaden	73-71-74-75=293	+5	
T17	(United States) Charlie Yates (a)	72-75-71-75=293	+5	
T19	(United States) Lawson Little	70-77-75-72=294	+6	
T19	(United States) Ed Oliver	73-75-74-72=294	+6	
T21	(United States) Johnny Bulla	73-73-74-75=295	+7	
T21	(United States) Dick Metz	71-74-75-75=295	+7	
T21	(United States) Gene Sarazen (c)	74-71-77-73=295	+7	
T21	(United States) Bud Ward (a)	74-68-75-78=295	+7	
T21	(United States) Al Watrous	75-70-73-77=295	+7	
26	(Australia) Jim Ferrier (a)	73-74-75-74=296	+8	
T27	(United States) Jimmy Hines	75-76-74-72=297	+9	
T27	(United States) Johnny Revolta	74-74-74-75=297	+9	
T29	(United States) Jim Foulis	74-75-73-76=298	+10	
T29	(United States) Tony Manero	75-75-73-75=298	+10	
T31	(United States) Dutch Harrison	72-76-74-77=299	+11	
T31	(United States) Frank Moore	76-72-73-78=299	+11	
T33	(United States) Chick Harbert (a)	74-77-75-75=301	+13	
T33	(Canada) Jules Huot	78-76-70-77=301	+13	
T33	(United States) Jimmy Thomson	77-76-70-78=301	+13	
T33	(United States) Wilford Wehrle (a)	74-71-76-80=301	+13	
37	(Argentina) Martin Pose	77-76-74-75=302	+14	
38	(United States) Tommy Armour	71-74-78-80=303	+15	
T39	(United States) Vic Ghezzi	77-75-74-79=305	+17	
T39	(United States) Bill Holt (a)	80-75-76-74=305	+17	
T39	(United States) Rod Munday	73-76-75-81=305	+17	
T39	(United States) Tommy Suffern Tailer (a)	79-74-74-78=305	+17	
T39	(England) Robert Sweeny Jr. (a)	76-78-73-78=305	+17	
T44	(United States) Art Doering (a)	76-79-76-75=306	+18	
T44	(United States) Chuck Kocsis (a)	76-79-74-77=306	+18	
46	(United States) Felix Serafin	85-72-80-71=308	+20	
T47	(United States) Horton Smith (c)	76-76-80-77=309	+21	
T47	(United States) Willie Turnesa (a)	76-74-81-78=309	+21	
49	(United States) George Dawson (a)	77-73-81-81=312	+24	
50	(Argentina) Enrique Bertolino	80-80-78-75=313	+25	
51	(United States) Chick Evans (a)	82-84-86-79=331	+43	
WD	(United States) Billy Burke	72-81-74=227	+11	
WD	(United States) Walter Hagen	77-78-73=228	+12	
WD	(United States) Ray Billows (a)	75-83-71=229	+13	
WD	(United States) Bobby Cruickshank	74-76-81=231	+15	
WD	(United States) Ky Laffoon	78-76=154	+10	
WD	(United States) Clayton Heafner	73-82=155	+11	
WD	(United States) Bobby Jones	79-76=155	+11	
WD	(United States) George Sargent			
