= 1948 Masters Tournament =

Tournament information
- Dates: April 8–11, 1948
- Location: Augusta, Georgia; 33.503°N 82.020°W
- Course: Augusta National Golf Club
- Organized by: Augusta National Golf Club
- Tour: PGA Tour

Statistics
- Par: 72
- Length: 6,800 yards (6,220 m)
- Field: 57 players
- Cut: none
- Prize fund: $10,000
- Winner's share: $2,500

Champion
- (United States) Claude Harmon
- 279 (−9)

Location map
- Location in the United States Location in Georgia

The 1948 Masters Tournament was the 12th Masters Tournament, held April 8–11 at Augusta National Golf Club in Augusta, Georgia.

== Tournament summary ==
Claude Harmon shot a record-tying 279 (−9) and finished five strokes ahead of runner-up Cary Middlecoff, a future champion in 1955. The Sunday gallery in 1948 was estimated at 10,000 spectators, and the tournament purse was $10,000. Harmon won $2,500 and his four-round score tied the record set by Ralph Guldahl in 1939. Primarily a club professional, it was Harmon's first tour victory.

This was the final appearance as a player in the Masters for host Bobby Jones, then age 46. It was also the last Masters that did not immediately present the iconic green jacket to the winner. The nine winners of the first twelve tournaments received their green jackets in 1949.

The five-stroke victory margin was matched by Ben Hogan in 1953; the record was raised to seven in 1955 by Cary Middlecoff, nine in 1965 by Jack Nicklaus, and twelve by Tiger Woods in 1997.

== Field ==
1. Masters champions

Jimmy Demaret (7,9), Ralph Guldahl (2), Herman Keiser (7,9), Byron Nelson (2,6,7,9), Henry Picard (6,9), Gene Sarazen (2,4,6), Horton Smith (9), Craig Wood (2)

2. U.S. Open champions

Billy Burke, Johnny Farrell, Bobby Jones (3,4,5), Lawson Little (3,5,9), Lloyd Mangrum (7,9,10,12), Lew Worsham (7,10,12)

3. U.S. Amateur champions

Dick Chapman (8,9,a), Skee Riegel (8,11,a)

4. British Open champions

Denny Shute (6,9), Sam Snead (6,7,9,10)

5. British Amateur champions

6. PGA champions

Jim Ferrier (9,10,12), Vic Ghezzi (9,10,12), Bob Hamilton, Ben Hogan (7,9,10)

7. Members of the U.S. 1947 Ryder Cup team

Herman Barron (9), Dutch Harrison (10)

- Ed Oliver (9,10) did not play.

8. Members of the U.S. 1947 Walker Cup team

George Hamer (a), Fred Kammer (a), Bud Ward (3,10,11,a)

- Ted Bishop (3,a), Smiley Quick (a), Frank Stranahan (9,10,a) and Willie Turnesa (3,5,a) did not play.

9. Top 24 players and ties from the 1947 Masters Tournament

Johnny Bulla, Fred Haas, Chandler Harper, Jug McSpaden, Dick Metz (10), Johnny Palmer (10), Toney Penna, Ellsworth Vines

10. Top 24 players and ties from the 1947 U.S. Open

Sammy Byrd, Ed Furgol, Leland Gibson (12), Chick Harbert (12), Claude Harmon, Joe Kirkwood Sr., Gene Kunes, Jim McHale Jr. (a), Bill Nary, Al Smith, Harry Todd

- George Payton and Paul Runyan did not play.

11. 1947 U.S. Amateur quarter-finalists

Bob Rosburg (a), Jack Selby (a), Felice Torza, Harvie Ward (a)

- Johnny Dawson (a) and Frank Strafaci (a) did not play.

12. 1947 PGA Championship quarter-finalists

Art Bell, Ky Laffoon

13. One amateur, not already qualified, selected by a ballot of ex-U.S. Amateur champions

- Chuck Kocsis (a) did not play

14. One professional, not already qualified, selected by a ballot of ex-U.S. Open champions

Skip Alexander

15. Two players, not already qualified, with the best scoring average in the winter part of the 1948 PGA Tour

Cary Middlecoff

- Clayton Heafner did not play.

16 Winner of the 1948 Inter-service Invitational tournament

- Played after the Masters, the winner receiving entry to the 1949 event.

17 Home club professional

Ed Dudley

18. Foreign invitations

Henry Cotton (4), Bobby Locke (9,10)

== Round summaries ==
=== First round ===
Thursday, April 8, 1948

Place	Player	Score	To par
1	(United States) Lloyd Mangrum	69	−3
T2	(United States) Ed Furgol	70	−2
T2	(United States) Claude Harmon	70	−2
T2	(United States) Ben Hogan	70	−2
T2	(United States) Herman Keiser	70	−2
T6	(United States) Art Bell	71	−1
T6	(Australia) Jim Ferrier	71	−1
T6	(United States) Chick Harbert	71	−1
T6	(South Africa) Bobby Locke	71	−1
T6	(United States) Dick Metz	71	−1
T6	(United States) Byron Nelson	71	−1
T6	(United States) Skee Riegel (a)	71	−1

=== Second round ===
Friday, April 9, 1948

Place	Player	Score	To par
1	(United States) Harry Todd	72-67=139	−5
2	(United States) Claude Harmon	70-70=140	−4
T3	(United States) Chick Harbert	71-70=141	−3
T3	(United States) Ben Hogan	70-71=141	−3
T5	(Australia) Jim Ferrier	71-71=142	−2
T5	(United States) Ed Furgol	70-72=142	−2
T5	(United States) Herman Keiser	70-72=142	−2
T5	(South Africa) Bobby Locke	71-71=142	−2
T5	(United States) Lloyd Mangrum	69-73=142	−2
10	(United States) Dick Metz	71-72=143	−1

=== Third round ===
Saturday, April 10, 1948

Place	Player	Score	To par
1	(United States) Claude Harmon	70-70-69=209	−7
2	(United States) Chick Harbert	71-70-70=211	−5
3	(United States) Cary Middlecoff	74-71-69=214	−2
4	(United States) Ed Furgol	70-72-73=215	−1
T5	(South Africa) Bobby Locke	71-71-74=216	E
T5	(United States) Byron Nelson	71-73-72=216	E
T7	(Australia) Jim Ferrier	71-71-75=217	+1
T7	(United States) Lloyd Mangrum	69-73-75=217	+1
T9	(United States) Ben Hogan	70-71-77=218	+2
T9	(United States) Herman Keiser	70-72-76=218	+2
T9	(United States) Dick Metz	71-72-75=218	+2
T9	(United States) Skee Riegel (a)	71-74-73=218	+2

=== Final round ===
Sunday, April 11, 1948

==== Final leaderboard ====
Champion
Silver Cup winner (low amateur)
(a) = amateur
(c) = past champion

Top 10
Place	Player	Score	To par	Money (US$)
1	(United States) Claude Harmon	70-70-69-70=279	−9	2,500
2	(United States) Cary Middlecoff	74-71-69-70=284	−4	1,500
3	(United States) Chick Harbert	71-70-70-76=287	−1	1,000
T4	(Australia) Jim Ferrier	71-71-75-71=288	E	750
T4	(United States) Lloyd Mangrum	69-73-75-71=288	E	750
T6	(United States) Ed Furgol	70-72-73-74=289	+1	500
T6	(United States) Ben Hogan	70-71-77-71=289	+1	500
T8	(United States) Byron Nelson (c)	71-73-72-74=290	+2	350
T8	(United States) Harry Todd	72-67-80-71=290	+2	350
T10	(United States) Herman Keiser (c)	70-72-76-73=291	+3	250
T10	(South Africa) Bobby Locke	71-71-74-75=291	+3	250
T10	(United States) Dick Metz	71-72-75-73=291	+3	250

Leaderboard below the top 10
Place	Player	Score	To par	Money ($)
T13	(United States) Johnny Bulla	74-72-76-71=293	+5	188
T13	(United States) Dutch Harrison	73-77-73-70=293	+5	188
T13	(United States) Skee Riegel (a)	71-74-73-75=293	+5	0
T16	(United States) Al Smith	73-73-74-74=294	+6	138
T16	(United States) Sam Snead	74-75-72-73=294	+6	138
T18	(United States) Jimmy Demaret (c)	73-72-78-72=295	+7	80
T18	(United States) Ed Dudley	73-76-75-71=295	+7	80
T18	(United States) Vic Ghezzi	75-73-73-74=295	+7	80
T18	(United States) Fred Haas	75-75-76-69=295	+7	80
T18	(United States) Bob Hamilton	72-72-76-75=295	+7	80
T23	(United States) Art Bell	71-74-74-77=296	+8	
T23	(United States) Gene Sarazen (c)	77-74-73-72=296	+8	
T25	(United States) Herman Barron	73-77-71-76=297	+9	
T25	(England) Henry Cotton	72-73-75-77=297	+9	
T25	(United States) Henry Picard (c)	73-73-74-77=297	+9	
T28	(United States) Johnny Palmer	75-73-76-74=298	+10	
T28	(United States) Ellsworth Vines	76-71-77-74=298	+10	
T30	(United States) Bud Ward (a)	74-74-77-74=299	+11	
T30	(United States) Lew Worsham	74-78-71-76=299	+11	
32	(United States) Denny Shute	74-73-76-77=300	+12	
33	(United States) Jug McSpaden	77-75-76-73=301	+13	
34	(United States) Horton Smith (c)	78-73-76-75=302	+14	
T35	(United States) Skip Alexander	77-73-77-76=303	+15	
T35	(United States) Ralph Guldahl (c)	75-78-75-75=303	+15	
T35	(United States) Ky Laffoon	74-75-76-78=303	+15	
T35	(United States) Jim McHale Jr. (a)	78-73-77-75=303	+15	
T35	(United States) Felice Torza	75-73-76-79=303	+15	
T40	(United States) Dick Chapman (a)	74-76-77-77=304	+16	
T40	(United States) Chandler Harper	76-76-77-75=304	+16	
T40	(United States) Lawson Little	73-77-76-78=304	+16	
T43	(United States) Billy Burke	75-75-76-79=305	+17	
T43	(United States) Leland Gibson	72-77-79-77=305	+17	
T43	(United States) Craig Wood (c)	77-80-77-71=305	+17	
46	(United States) Toney Penna	77-78-75-77=307	+19	
47	(United States) Sammy Byrd	84-75-75-76=310	+22	
48	(United States) Johnny Farrell	74-80-78-79=311	+23	
49	(United States) Bill Nary	74-79-86-74=313	+25	
50	(United States) Bobby Jones	76-81-79-79=315	+27	
T51	(United States) Fred Kammer (a)	78-75-77-86=316	+28	
T51	(United States) Harvie Ward (a)	78-78-81-79=316	+28	
53	(United States) Bob Rosburg (a)	79-81-80-78=318	+30	
54	(United States) Jack Selby (a)	81-76-84-80=321	+33	
WD	(United States) Gene Kunes	74-76-76=226	+10	
WD	(United States) George Hamer (a)	77-78-76=231	+15	
WD	(United States) Joe Kirkwood Sr.	78-77-82=237	+21	

==== Scorecard ====
Hole	1	2	3	4	5	6	7	8	9	10	11	12	13	14	15	16	17	18
Par	4	5	4	3	4	3	4	5	4	4	4	3	5	4	5	3	4	4
(United States) Harmon	−7	−7	−7	−6	−6	−7	−8	−10	−10	−10	−10	−9	−9	−10	−9	−9	−9	−9
(United States) Middlecoff	−2	−2	−1	E	E	−1	−1	−1	−1	−1	−1	−1	−2	−2	−3	−3	−3	−4
(United States) Harbert	−5	−5	−5	−5	−4	−3	−3	−2	−2	−2	−2	−2	−2	−2	−2	−2	−2	−1
(Australia) Ferrier	+1	E	−1	−1	−1	−1	−2	−3	−3	−2	−2	−1	−2	−1	−2	−2	−1	E
(United States) Mangrum	+2	+1	E	E	E	+1	+1	+1	+1	+1	+2	+3	+2	+2	+1	+1	+1	E
(United States) Furgol	−1	−1	−1	E	+1	+1	+1	+1	+1	+1	+1	+2	+1	+1	E	E	+1	+1
(United States) Hogan	+2	+2	+2	+1	+1	+1	+2	+1	+1	+2	+2	+2	+2	+2	+1	+1	+1	+1
(United States) Nelson	E	E	+1	+2	+3	+3	+2	+1	+1	+1	+2	+2	+2	+2	+1	+1	+2	+2
(South Africa) Locke	E	E	+1	+1	+1	+1	+2	+2	+2	+2	+3	+3	+4	+4	+3	+3	+3	+3

Cumulative tournament scores, relative to par

Eagle	Birdie	Bogey
