= 1939 Masters Tournament =

Tournament information
- Dates: March 31 – April 2, 1939
- Location: Augusta, Georgia; 33.503°N 82.020°W
- Course: Augusta National Golf Club
- Organized by: Augusta National Golf Club
- Tour: PGA Tour

Statistics
- Par: 72
- Field: 46 players
- Cut: None
- Prize fund: $5,000
- Winner's share: $1,500

Champion
- (United States) Ralph Guldahl
- 279 (−9)

Location map
- Location in the United States Location in Georgia

The 1939 Masters Tournament was the sixth Masters Tournament, held from March 31 to April 2 at Augusta National Golf Club in Augusta, Georgia. Due to adverse weather conditions, the first round was postponed to Friday and the final two rounds were played on Sunday.

Ralph Guldahl won his only Masters title with a tournament record 279 (−9), one stroke better than runner-up Sam Snead. He had finished as a runner-up the previous two years, and it was the third of Guldahl's three major titles; he won consecutive U.S. Open titles in 1937 and 1938. The previous Masters record was 282 (−6) in 1935, and Guldahl's mark stood until 1953, when Ben Hogan shot 274 (−14).

The purse was $5,000 with a winner's share of $1,500. The gallery for Sunday's final two rounds was estimated at 10,000 spectators. Challenging weather conditions during the second round on Saturday included hail, wind, rain, and some sun breaks. It also was the first time the tournament was called The Masters instead of the Augusta National Invitation Tournament.

== Field ==
1. Masters champions

Byron Nelson (7,9,10,12), Henry Picard (7,9,10,12), Gene Sarazen (2,4,6,7,9,10,12), Horton Smith (7,9,10,12)

2. U.S. Open champions

Tommy Armour (4,6,10), Billy Burke (9), Johnny Farrell, Ralph Guldahl (7,9,10), Walter Hagen (4,6), Bobby Jones (3,4,5,9), Tony Manero (7,9)

3. U.S. Amateur champions

Lawson Little (5,9), Jess Sweetser (5,a), Willie Turnesa (11,a)

4. British Open champions

Jock Hutchison (6), Denny Shute (6,7,10)

5. British Amateur champions

Charlie Yates (8,a)

6. PGA champions

Johnny Revolta (7,9,10), Paul Runyan (9,10,12)

7. Members of the U.S. 1937 Ryder Cup team

Ed Dudley (9), Sam Snead (12)

8. Members of the U.S. 1938 Walker Cup team

Ray Billows (a), Tommy Suffern Tailer (9,a)

- Johnny Fischer (3,a), Johnny Goodman (2,3,5,11,a), Fred Haas (a), Chuck Kocsis (9,a), Reynolds Smith (a) and Bud Ward (a) did not play. Tailer was a reserve for the team.

9. Top 30 players and ties from the 1938 Masters Tournament

Harry Cooper (10), Vic Ghezzi (10), Jimmy Hines (10,12), Ben Hogan, Ky Laffoon, Ray Mangrum, Jug McSpaden (10), Dick Metz (10), Felix Serafin, Jimmy Thomson, Frank Walsh, Al Watrous

- Wiffy Cox, Bobby Cruickshank and Sam Parks Jr. (2) did not play.

10. Top 30 players and ties from the 1938 U.S. Open

Joe Belfore, Jim Foulis (12), Frank Moore, Toney Penna

- Olin Dutra (2,6), Willie Hunter (5), Al Huske, Stanley Kertes, Butch Kreuger, Charles Lacey, Ray Mangrum, John Rogers, Charles Sheppard, George Von Elm (3), Al Zimmerman and Emery Zimmerman did not play,

11. 1938 U.S. Amateur quarter-finalists

Dick Chapman (a), Chick Harbert (a), Joe Thompson (a)

- Pat Abbott (a), Chris Brinke (a) and Ed Kingsley (a) did not play.

12. 1938 PGA Championship quarter-finalists

13. Two players, not already qualified, with the best scoring average in the winter part of the 1939 PGA Tour

Jimmy Demaret, Craig Wood

14 Foreign invitations

Stanley Horne

Additional invitation

Ted Adams (a) winner of 1938 Canadian Amateur Championship

== Round summaries ==
=== First round ===
Friday, March 31, 1939

Place	Player	Score	To par
1	(United States) Billy Burke	69	−3
2	(United States) Sam Snead	70	−2
T3	(United States) Tommy Armour	71	−1
T3	(United States) Byron Nelson	71	−1
T3	(United States) Henry Picard	71	−1
T6	(United States) Jimmy Demaret	72	E
T6	(United States) Ralph Guldahl	72	E
T6	(United States) Ky Laffoon	72	E
T6	(United States) Lawson Little	72	E
T6	(United States) Dick Metz	72	E
T6	(United States) Toney Penna	72	E
T6	(United States) Craig Wood	72	E

=== Second round ===
Saturday, April 1, 1939

Place	Player	Score	To par
1	(United States) Gene Sarazen	73-66=139	−5
T2	(United States) Ralph Guldahl	72-68=140	−4
T2	(United States) Byron Nelson	71-69=140	−4
T2	(United States) Sam Snead	70-70=140	−4
5	(United States) Billy Burke	69-72=141	−3
6	(United States) Henry Picard	71-71=142	−2
7	(United States) Lawson Little	72-72=144	E
T8	(United States) Tommy Armour	71-74=145	+1
T8	(United States) Craig Wood	72-73=145	+1
T10	(United States) Ben Hogan	75-71=146	+2
T10	(United States) Jimmy Thomson	75-71=146	+2

=== Third round ===
Sunday, April 2, 1939 (morning)

Place	Player	Score	To par
1	(United States) Ralph Guldahl	72-68-70=210	−6
2	(United States) Gene Sarazen	73-66-72=211	−5
T3	(United States) Billy Burke	69-72-71=212	−4
T3	(United States) Lawson Little	72-72-68=212	−4
T3	(United States) Byron Nelson	71-69-72=212	−4
T3	(United States) Sam Snead	70-70-72=212	−4
7	(United States) Craig Wood	72-73-71=216	E
T8	(United States) Ben Hogan	75-71-72=218	+2
T8	(United States) Henry Picard	71-71-76=218	+2
T10	(United States) Ed Dudley	75-75-69=219	+3
T10	(United States) Toney Penna	72-75-72=219	+3

=== Final round ===
Sunday, April 2, 1939 (afternoon)

==== Final leaderboard ====
Champion
Silver Cup winner (low amateur)
(a) = amateur
(c) = past champion

Top 10
Place	Player	Score	To par	Money (US$)
1	(United States) Ralph Guldahl	72-68-70-69=279	−9	1,500
2	(United States) Sam Snead	70-70-72-68=280	−8	800
T3	(United States) Billy Burke	69-72-71-70=282	−6	550
T3	(United States) Lawson Little	72-72-68-70=282	−6	550
5	(United States) Gene Sarazen (c)	73-66-72-72=283	−5	400
6	(United States) Craig Wood	72-73-71-68=284	−4	300
7	(United States) Byron Nelson (c)	71-69-72-75=287	−1	250
8	(United States) Henry Picard (c)	71-71-76-71=289	+1	175
9	(United States) Ben Hogan	75-71-72-72=290	+2	175
T10	(United States) Ed Dudley	75-75-69-72=291	+3	100
T10	(United States) Toney Penna	72-75-72-72=291	+3	100

Leaderboard below the top 10
Place	Player	Score	To par	Money ($)
T12	(United States) Tommy Armour	71-74-76-72=293	+5	33
T12	(United States) Vic Ghezzi	73-76-72-72=293	+5	33
T12	(United States) Jug McSpaden	75-72-74-72=293	+5	33
15	(United States) Denny Shute	78-71-73-72=294	+6	
T16	(United States) Paul Runyan	73-71-75-76=295	+7	
T16	(United States) Felix Serafin	74-76-73-72=295	+7	
T18	(United States) Chick Harbert (a)	74-73-75-74=296	+8	
T18	(United States) Jimmy Thomson	75-71-73-77=296	+8	
T18	(United States) Charlie Yates (a)	74-73-74-75=296	+8	
21	(United States) Tommy Suffern Tailer (a)	78-75-73-71=297	+9	
T22	(United States) Jimmy Hines	76-73-74-75=298	+10	
T22	(United States) Ky Laffoon	72-75-73-78=298	+10	
T22	(United States) Frank Moore	75-74-75-74=298	+10	
25	(United States) Al Watrous	75-75-74-75=299	+11	
T26	(United States) Tony Manero	76-73-77-74=300	+12	
T26	(United States) Horton Smith (c)	75-79-74-72=300	+12	
T26	(United States) Willie Turnesa (a)	78-70-79-73=300	+12	
T29	(United States) Jess Sweetser (a)	75-75-75-77=302	+14	
T29	(United States) Frank Walsh	76-76-72-78=302	+14	
T31	(United States) Dick Metz	72-80-77-74=303	+15	
T31	(United States) Johnny Revolta	77-74-76-76=303	+15	
T33	(United States) Harry Cooper	76-77-73-78=304	+16	
T33	(United States) Jimmy Demaret	72-81-77-74=304	+16	
T33	(United States) Walter Hagen	76-76-76-76=304	+16	
T33	(United States) Bobby Jones	76-77-78-73=304	+16	
T37	(United States) Dick Chapman (a)	78-77-77-77=309	+21	
T37	(United States) Jim Foulis	80-76-77-76=309	+21	
39	(United States) Johnny Farrell	81-75-79-77=312	+24	
40	(United States) Ted Adams (a)	78-77-83-76=314	+26	
41	(United States) Ray Billows (a)	75-84-78-80=317	+29	
42	(United States) Joe Belfore	83-79-78-78=318	+30	
43	(United States) Joe Thompson	81-84-79-78=322	+34	
WD	(United States) Jock Hutchison	79-77=156	+12	
WD	(United States) Ray Mangrum	77	+5	
WD	(Canada) Stanley Horne	82	+10	
