= 1936 U.S. Open (golf) =

Coordinates: 40.705°N 74.328°W

Tournament information
- Dates: June 4–6, 1936
- Location: Springfield, New Jersey
- Course(s): Baltusrol Golf Club; Upper Course
- Organized by: USGA
- Tour: PGA Tour
- Format: Stroke play − 72 holes

Statistics
- Par: 72
- Length: 6,866 yards (6,278 m)
- Field: 164 players, 76 after cut
- Cut: 151 (+7)
- Prize fund: $5,000
- Winner's share: $1,000

Champion
- (United States) Tony Manero
- 282 (−6)

Location in the United States
Location in New Jersey
Location in Union County

The 1936 U.S. Open was the 40th U.S. Open, held June 4–6 at Baltusrol Golf Club in Springfield, New Jersey, west of New York City.

Tony Manero, a relatively unknown pro from New York playing out of North Carolina, surpassed third round leader Harry Cooper in the final round to claim his only major title. The purse was $5,000 and the winner's share was $1,000. The Upper Course was used for this championship; the Lower Course has been used for all subsequent majors at Baltusrol.

Entering the final round, Cooper led Manero by four strokes. Manero's final round 67 (−5) was a course record and gave him a 72-hole total of 282 (−6), two strokes ahead of Cooper, who shot 73 (+1) for 284. Manero's total of 282 set a new U.S. Open tournament record by four shots; the previous record of 286 was set in 1916.

Manero was fortunate to even be in the championship, because during sectional qualifying, he needed a chip-in on his final hole just to qualify. His victory was not without controversy. During the final round he was paired with Gene Sarazen, whose tournament scoring record he would break. Sarazen apparently requested the pairing as he believed he could help the notoriously high-strung Manero, a close friend, stay calm. Afterwards a complaint was filed with the USGA alleging that Sarazen was actually giving advice to Manero, a violation of the rules. After a meeting, the USGA ruled that there was no evidence of any wrongdoing, and Manero was allowed to keep the championship.

In contrast to the previous year, scoring conditions at the Open were ideal throughout the week. For the tournament, 38 players broke par and the scoring average was 76.04, both numbers setting U.S. Open records. Chuck Kocsis finished as low amateur in a tie for 14th place.

A record field of 1,278 entered the qualifying for this U.S. Open, up from 1,177 in 1935.

== Course ==
Upper Course

Hole	1	2	3	4	5	6	7	8	9	Out	10	11	12	13	14	15	16	17	18	In	Total
Yards	471	423	186	390	385	439	216	538	346	3,394	158	602	340	365	40	140	439	563	465	3,472	6,866
Par	5	4	3	4	4	4	3	5	4	36	3	5	4	4	4	3	4	5	4	36	72

- Note: The Lower Course has been used for all subsequent majors at Baltusrol.

Lengths of the courses for previous major championships at Baltusrol:

- 6,212 yards (5,680 m), par 74 - 1915 U.S. Open (Old Course) The Old Course was plowed under in 1918
- 6,003 yards (5,489 m), par - 1903 U.S. Open (Old Course)

== Round summaries ==
=== First round ===
Thursday, June 4, 1936

Place	Player	Score	To Par
T1	(United States) Clarence Clark	69	−3
T1	(United States) Ray Mangrum	69	−3
T1	(United States) Paul Runyan	69	−3
T4	(United States) Vic Ghezzi	70	−2
T4	(United States) Tom Kerrigan	70	−2
T4	(United States) Leslie Madison	70	−2
T4	(United States) Frank Moore	70	−2
T4	(United States) Henry Picard	70	−2
T4	(United States) Johnny Revolta	70	−2
T10	(United States) Johnny Bulla	71	−1
T10	(United States) Harry Cooper	71	−1
T10	(United States) Ky Laffoon	71	−1
T10	(United States) Ted Longworth	71	−1
T10	(United States) Craig Wood	71	−1

=== Second round ===
Friday, June 5, 1936

Place	Player	Score	To Par
T1	(United States) Vic Ghezzi	70-70=140	−4
T1	(United States) Ray Mangrum	69-71=140	−4
T3	(United States) Harry Cooper	71-70=141	−3
T3	(United States) Henry Picard	70-71=141	−3
T3	(United States) Johnny Revolta	70-71=141	−3
T3	(United States) Denny Shute	72-69=141	−3
7	(United States) Tony Manero	73-69=142	−2
T8	(United States) Ralph Guldahl	73-70=143	−1
T8	(United States) Chuck Kocsis (a)	72-71=143	−1
T10	(United States) Clarence Clark	69-75=144	E
T10	(United States) Frank Moore	70-74=144	E
T10	(United States) Jack Munger (a)	74-70=144	E
T10	(United States) Paul Runyan	69-75=144	E

=== Third round ===
Saturday, June 6, 1936 (morning)

Place	Player	Score	To Par
1	(United States) Harry Cooper	71-70-70=211	−5
2	(United States) Vic Ghezzi	70-70-73=213	−3
3	(United States) Denny Shute	72-69-73=214	−2
T4	(United States) Clarence Clark	69-75-71=215	−1
T4	(United States) Ky Laffoon	71-74-70=215	−1
T4	(United States) Tony Manero	73-69-73=215	−1
T4	(United States) Henry Picard	70-71-74=215	−1
T8	(United States) Herman Barron	73-74-69=216	E
T8	(United States) Ralph Guldahl	73-70-73=216	E
T8	(United States) Chuck Kocsis (a)	72-71-73=216	E
T8	(United States) Ray Mangrum	69-71-76=216	E

=== Final round ===
Saturday, June 6, 1936 (afternoon)

Place	Player	Score	To Par	Money ($)
1	(United States) Tony Manero	73-69-73-67=282	−6	1,000
2	(United States) Harry Cooper	71-70-70-73=284	−4	750
3	(United States) Clarence Clark	69-75-71-72=287	−1	650
4	(United States) Macdonald Smith	73-73-72-70=288	E	550
T5	(United States) Wiffy Cox	74-74-69-72=289	+1	350
T5	(United States) Ky Laffoon	71-74-70-74=289	+1	350
T5	(United States) Henry Picard	70-71-74-74=289	+1	350
T8	(United States) Ralph Guldahl	73-70-73-74=290	+2	137
T8	(United States) Paul Runyan	69-75-73-73=290	+2	137
10	(United States) Denny Shute	72-69-73-77=291	+3	100
