= 1934 PGA Championship =

Coordinates: 42.977°N 78.752°W

Tournament information
- Dates: July 24–29, 1934
- Location: Williamsville, New York, U.S.
- Course: Park Country Club
- Organized by: PGA of America
- Tour: PGA Tour
- Format: Match play - 5 rounds

Statistics
- Par: 72
- Length: 6,579 yards (6,016 m)
- Field: 107 players, 32 to match play
- Cut: 146 (+2), playoff
- Prize fund: $7,200
- Winner's share: $1,000

Champion
- (United States) Paul Runyan
- def. Craig Wood, 38 holes

Location in the United States
Location in New York

The 1934 PGA Championship was the 17th PGA Championship, held July 24–29 at Park Country Club in Williamsville, New York, a suburb northeast of Buffalo. Then a match play championship, Paul Runyan won the first of his two PGA Championship titles, defeating Craig Wood in 38 holes.

Defending champion Gene Sarazen lost 4 and 3 in the second round to Al Watrous.

== Format ==
The match play format at the PGA Championship in 1934 called for 12 rounds (216 holes) in six days:

- Tuesday – 36-hole stroke play qualifier
  - defending champion Gene Sarazen and top 31 professionals advanced to match play
- Wednesday – first round – 36 holes
- Thursday – second round – 36 holes
- Friday – quarterfinals – 36 holes
- Saturday – semifinals – 36 holes
- Sunday – final – 36 holes

== Final results ==
Sunday, July 29, 1934

Place	Player	Money ($)
1	(United States) Paul Runyan	1,000
2	(United States) Craig Wood	500
T3	(United States) Gene Kunes	250
T3	(United States) Denny Shute	250
T5	(United States) Bob Crowley	200
T5	(United States) Al Houghton	200
T5	(United States) Dick Metz	200
T5	(United States) Al Watrous	200

== Final eight bracket ==
Quarter-finals; July 27
Paul Runyan	1up
Dick Metz
Gene Kunes	4&3
Bob Crowley
Craig Wood	2&1
Al Watrous
Denny Shute	6&5
Al Houghton

Semi-finals; July 28
Paul Runyan	4&2
Gene Kunes
Craig Wood	2&1
Denny Shute

Finals; July 29
Paul Runyan	38h
Craig Wood

== Final match scorecards ==
Morning

Hole	1	2	3	4	5	6	7	8	9	10	11	12	13	14	15	16	17	18
Par	5	4	4	4	3	4	4	3	5	3	5	5	3	4	4	4	4	4
(United States) Runyan	4	5	4	4	3	4	5	3	4	3	4	4	3	3	4	5	4	6
(United States) Wood	5	4	3	4	3	4	4	3	4	3	5	4	3	4	4	5	4	4
Leader	R1	–	W1	W1	W1	W1	W2	W2	W2	W2	W1	W1	W1	–	–	–	–	W1

Afternoon

Hole	1	2	3	4	5	6	7	8	9	10	11	12	13	14	15	16	17	18
Par	5	4	4	4	3	4	4	3	5	3	5	5	3	4	4	4	4	4
(United States) Runyan	4	4	4	4	3	4	4	3	4	3	4	5	3	3	4	4	4	4
(United States) Wood	4	5	4	4	4	3	4	2	5	3	3	5	3	4	5	4	3	4
Leader	W1	–	–	–	R1	–	–	W1	–	–	W1	W1	W1	–	R1	R1	–	–

Extra holes

Hole	1	2
Par	5	4
(United States) Runyan	4	4
(United States) Wood	4	5
Leader	–	R1

Eagle	Birdie	Bogey	Double bogey
