= Glens Falls Open =

Golf tournament formerly on the PGA Tour

The Glens Falls Open was a golf tournament on the PGA Tour from 1929 to 1939. It was played at the Glens Falls Country Club in Glens Falls, New York.

== Winners ==
- 1939 Denny Shute
- 1938 Tony Manero
- 1937 Jimmy Hines
- 1936 Jimmy Hines
- 1935 Willie Macfarlane
- 1934 Ky Laffoon
- 1933 Jimmy Hines
- 1932 Denny Shute
- 1931 Billy Burke
- 1930 Tony Manero
- 1929 Billy Burke
