= Columbus Invitational =

Golf tournament

The Columbus Invitational was a golf tournament played in Columbus, Ohio from 1946 to 1948. The first two events were held at Columbus Country Club while the final edition was played at Wyandot Country Club. The event was sponsored by the Zooligans, an organisation that raised money for Columbus Zoo.

== Winners ==
Year	Player	Country	Score	To par	Margin of victory	Runner-up	Winner's share ($)	Ref
1948	Lloyd Mangrum	United States	268	−16	1 stroke	(United States) George Schoux	2,000	
1947	Bobby Locke	South Africa	274	−14	5 strokes	(United States) Jimmy Demaret	2,000	
1946	Byron Nelson	United States	276	−12	2 strokes	(United States) Ed Oliver	2,500	
