= Pasadena Open =

Golf tournament formerly on the PGA Tour

Tournament information
- Location: Pasadena, California
- Established: 1929
- Course: Brookside Golf Course
- Par: 71
- Tour: PGA Tour
- Format: Stroke play - 72 holes
- Prize fund: $3,000 (1938)
- Month played: January (also December)
- Final year: 1938

Final champion
- (United States) Henry Picard

The Pasadena Open was a golf tournament on the PGA Tour from 1929 to 1938, held at the Brookside Golf Course in Pasadena, California.

== Winners ==
- 1938 (Jan.) Henry Picard
- 1936–37 No tournament
- 1935 (Dec.) Horton Smith (2)
- 1934 Harold "Jug" McSpaden
- 1933 Paul Runyan
- 1932 Craig Wood (2)
- 1931 Harry Cooper
- 1930 Tony Manero
- 1929 Horton Smith
- 1929 (Jan.) Craig Wood
