= Gasparilla Open =

Golf tournament in the United States

The Gasparilla Open was a golf tournament on the PGA Tour from 1932 to 1935. It was played at the Palma Ceia Golf and Country Club in Tampa, Florida. The tournament was played at match play in 1932 and at stroke play thereafter. Up until 1935, The Gasparilla Open was the top money PGA tournament in the United States with an average purse of $4,000. The tournament was discontinued after 1935. The tournament resumed as an amateur event in 1956, The Gasparilla Invitational.

The winner in 1932 was PGA Hall of Fame member Paul Runyan (29 PGA wins, 2 majors). He won 3 and 1 in the 36-hole final over Willie Macfarlane.

In 1933 and 1934, the tournament was won by Denny Shute (16 PGA wins, 3 majors) in medal competition. In 1933, Shute beat Willie Macfarlane in a sudden-death playoff. After his 1933 Gasparilla victory, Shute went on that year to win the Open Championship on the Old Course in St Andrews, Scotland. In 1934, Shute beat Horton Smith in an 18-hole playoff.

The winner in 1935 was Walter Hagen, then the holder of 43 PGA tournament titles and 11 majors. Hagen was recognized as the greatest professional golfer of his era, but at age 42 he had not won a PGA tournament in 2 years. In his autobiography chapter entitled Gasparilla, Hagen recounts how at dawn on the morning of the first round of the tournament, he found himself across the Bay at the Belleview-Biltmore Hotel, still attired in his tuxedo after an all-night party. To prepare for his upcoming play, he sent his chauffeur into a field beside the hotel to retrieve a few practice shots. After topping three shots in a row, he decided that was enough practice, and headed off to Tampa, briefly interrupted by a flat tire. Just two minutes before his 9:00 tee time, Hagen sauntered up to the first tee to play without a single practice swing or putt. He then proceeded to shoot a course record 64 to take the first day's lead. In the final round of the tournament, Hagen stepped onto the par-3 17th tee one stroke behind the clubhouse leader, Clarence Clark, and appeared likely to lose, especially after his tee shot landed 45 feet from the pin. However, as the New York Times reported the next day, he "nonchalantly" holed the long birdie putt before a cheering crowd to tie for the lead. He then birdied 18 with an up and down from the bunker to capture his final PGA individual victory.

== Winners ==
- 1932 Paul Runyan
- 1933 Denny Shute
- 1934 Denny Shute
- 1935 Walter Hagen
