= Lloyd Mangrum =

American professional golfer (1914–1973)

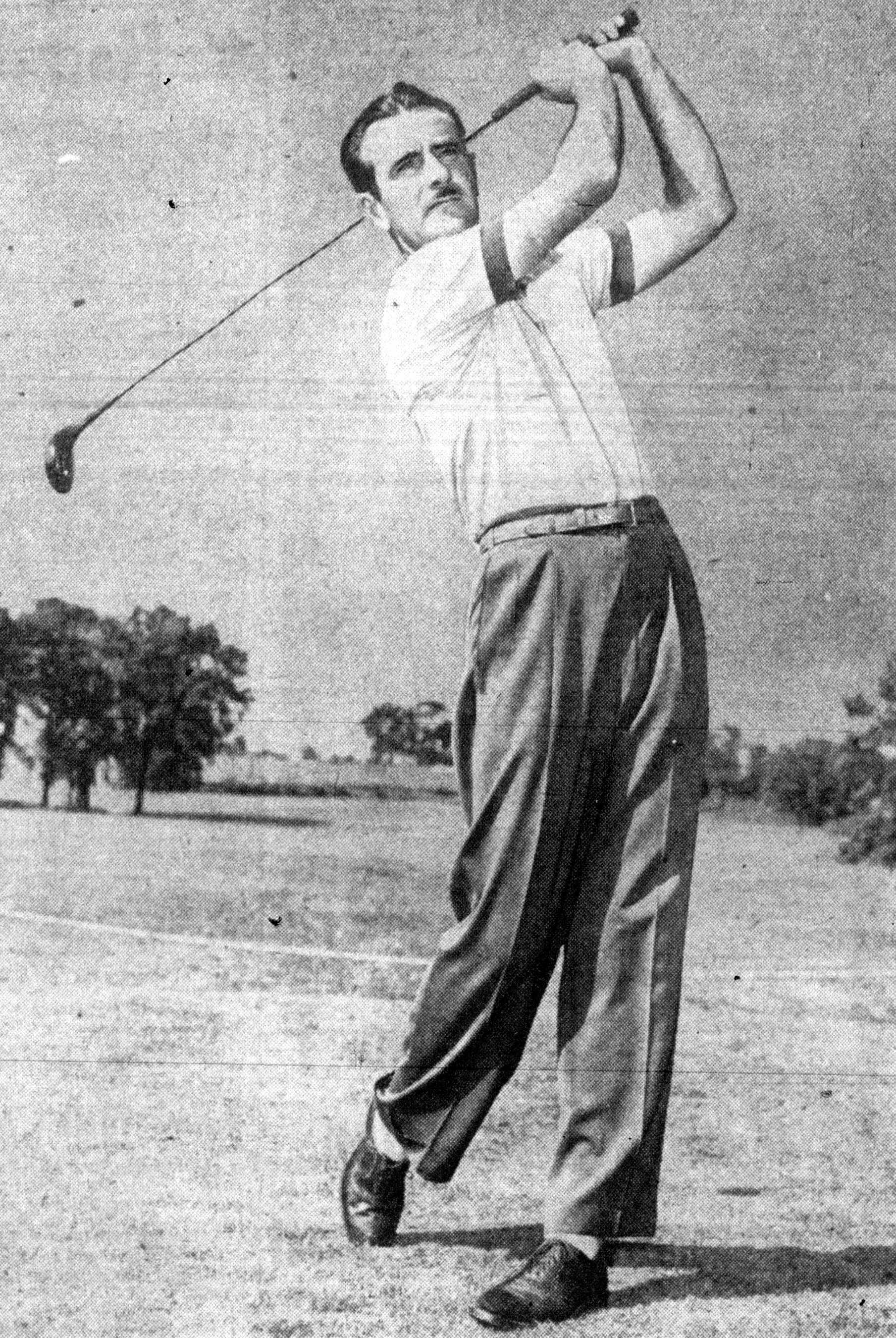
- Mangrum, circa 1951

Personal information
- Full name: Lloyd Eugene Mangrum
- Nickname: Mr. Icicle
- Nationality: United States
- Born: August 1, 1914 Trenton, Texas, U.S.
- Died: November 17, 1973 (aged 59) Apple Valley, California, U.S.

Career
- Sport: Golf
- College: None
- Turned professional: 1929
- Former tour: PGA Tour
- Professional wins: 45

Number of wins by tour
- PGA Tour: 36
- Other: 9

Best results in major championships (wins: 1)
- Masters Tournament: 2nd/T2: 1940, 1949
- PGA Championship: T3: 1941, 1949
- U.S. Open: Won: 1946
- The Open Championship: T24: 1953

Achievements and awards
- World Golf Hall of Fame: 1998 (member page)
- PGA Tour leading money winner: 1951
- Vardon Trophy: 1951, 1953

Lloyd Mangrum
- Military career
- Allegiance: United States
- Branch: U.S. Army
- Rank: Staff sergeant
- Unit: 90th Infantry Division
- Conflicts: World War II: Normandy Campaign; Western Allied invasion of Germany
- Awards: Bronze Star (2); Purple Heart (2)

Lloyd Eugene Mangrum (August 1, 1914 – November 17, 1973) was an American professional golfer. He was known for his smooth swing and his relaxed demeanour on the course, which earned him the nickname "Mr. Icicle."

== Career ==
Mangrum was born on August 1, 1914, in Trenton, Texas, he became a professional golfer at age fifteen, working as an assistant to his brother Ray, the head professional at Cliff-Dale Country Club in Dallas.

Mangrum joined the PGA Tour in 1937 and went on to win 36 events on the Tour. He might have won more if his career had not been interrupted by service in World War II.

While serving in the U.S. Army and training for deployment in the European Theater, Mangrum was offered the professional's job at the Fort Meade golf course in Maryland, which would have kept him out of combat, but he declined. He was assigned to the 90th Infantry Division Reconnaissance Troop and was injured in a jeep accident near Falaise on August 21, 1944. He recuperated for six months in England and returned to his unit in February 1945. He was awarded a Purple Heart after being wounded by shrapnel in Germany. He returned to competitive golf winning a U.S. Army European Theater Golf Tournament at St. Cloud, France in July 1945. He later played at the Old Course in St Andrews, Scotland in the Daily Mail 1500 Guineas Tournament and was victorious in the U.S. Army Inter-Theater Tournament in Biarritz, France in October 1945. He was discharged from the Army as a corporal in January 1946.

Mangrum's best years on tour came after the war: he led the PGA Tour money list in 1951 and won the Vardon Trophy for the lowest scoring average on the tour in both 1951 and 1953.

Mangrum's only major title came at the U.S. Open in 1946, though he was runner-up in three majors and third in six more (including twice losing in the semi-finals in the PGA Championship when it was a match-play event). He lost a playoff for the 1950 U.S. Open at Merion to Ben Hogan and his famous one-iron. Mangrum finished in the top ten at the Masters Tournament ten consecutive years. He shot 64 in the opening round in 1940, a Masters record that stood for 46 years, until Nick Price's 63 in the third round in 1986.

Mangrum played on four Ryder Cup teams in 1947, 1949, 1951, and 1953. On the last occasion, he was a playing captain. He had a record of six wins, two losses, and no ties (.750), including three wins, one loss, and no ties (.750) in singles matches.

In 1954, Mangrum built a house in Apple Valley, California across the street from the 18th tee of the Apple Valley Golf Club. The house, located at 19960 Rancherias Road and designed by McFarland Bonsall & Thomas, was profiled in the Los Angeles Times. The house was used as the Flying Crown Ranch in the television series Sky King. Mangrum lived in the house until his death.

== Death and legacy ==
Mangrum died at age 59 in Apple Valley, California in 1973. The cause of death was a heart attack, the 12th he had suffered. Mangrum was called "the forgotten man of golf" by sportswriter Jim Murray. Even though only 12 men have won more PGA Tour events, his reputation has been overshadowed by the other stars of his era who lived long, extraordinary lives such as Sam Snead and fellow Texans Ben Hogan, Jimmy Demaret and Byron Nelson. At the 1996 Masters, Nelson conducted a test. "I asked three young pros if they ever heard of Lloyd Mangrum, and they never had." Nelson commented, "Lloyd's the best player who's been forgotten since I've been playing golf." A quarter century after his death, he was inducted into the World Golf Hall of Fame in 1998.

== Awards and honors ==
- In 1951, Mangrum won the PGA Tour's money list.
- In 1951 and 1953, Mangrum earned the Vardon Trophy for the lowest scoring average on the PGA Tour.
- In 1998, Mangrum was inducted he World Golf Hall of Fame.

== Professional wins ==
=== PGA Tour wins (36) ===
- 1940 (1) Thomasville Open
- 1941 (1) Atlantic City Open
- 1942 (3) New Orleans Open, Seminole Victory Golf Tournament, Inverness Invitational Four-Ball (with Lawson Little)
- 1946 (1) **U.S. Open**
- 1947 (2) National Capital Open, Albuquerque Open
- 1948 (7) Bing Crosby Pro-Am, Lower Rio Grande Open, Greater Greensboro Open, Columbus Invitational, All American Open, World Championship of Golf, Utah Open
- 1949 (4) Los Angeles Open, Tucson Open, Motor City Open (co-winner with Cary Middlecoff), All American Open
- 1950 (5) Fort Wayne Open, Motor City Open, Eastern Open, Kansas City Open, Palm Beach Round Robin
- 1951 (4) Los Angeles Open, Tucson Open, Wilmington Azalea Open, St. Paul Open
- 1952 (2) Phoenix Open, Western Open
- 1953 (4) Los Angeles Open, Bing Crosby Pro-Am Invitational, Phoenix Open, All American Open
- 1954 (1) Western Open
- 1956 (1) Los Angeles Open

Major championship is shown in bold.

=== Other wins (9) ===
- 1938 Pennsylvania Open Championship
- 1939 Central New York Open, Santa Anita Open
- 1940 Santa Anita Open
- 1946 Argentine Open
- 1952 California State Open, Philippine Open, Adelaide Advertiser Special Tournament (Australia), Ampol Tournament (Nov)

== Major championships ==
=== Wins (1) ===
Year	Championship	54 holes	Winning score	Margin	Runners-up
1946	U.S. Open	1 shot deficit	−4 (74-70-68-72=284)	Playoff ^{1}	(United States) Vic Ghezzi, (United States) Byron Nelson

^{1} Defeated Ghezzi and Nelson in a playoff. All three shot 72 (E) in first 18-hole playoff. Second 18-hole playoff: Mangum 72=144 (E), Ghezzi 73=145 (+1), Nelson 73=145 (+1).

=== Results timeline ===
Tournament	1937	1938	1939
Masters Tournament			
U.S. Open	CUT		T56
The Open Championship			
PGA Championship			

Tournament	1940	1941	1942	1943	1944	1945	1946	1947	1948	1949
Masters Tournament	2	T9	WD	NT	NT	NT	T16	T8	T4	T2
U.S. Open	T5	T10	NT	NT	NT	NT	1	T23	T21	T14
The Open Championship	NT	NT	NT	NT	NT	NT				
PGA Championship		SF	R16	NT			R64	QF	R32	SF

Tournament	1950	1951	1952	1953	1954	1955	1956	1957	1958	1959
Masters Tournament	6	T3	6	3	T4	7	T4	T28	CUT	CUT
U.S. Open	2	T4	T10	3	T3			CUT	T37	
The Open Championship				T24						
PGA Championship	QF	R16	R32							

Tournament	1960	1961	1962
Masters Tournament	43	CUT	T33
U.S. Open	T23		
The Open Championship			
PGA Championship			

Win
Top 10
Did not play

NT = no tournament
CUT = missed the half-way cut
R64, R32, R16, QF, SF = Round in which player lost in PGA Championship match play
"T" indicates a tie for a place

=== Summary ===
Tournament	Wins	2nd	3rd	Top-5	Top-10	Top-25	Events	Cuts made
Masters Tournament	0	2	2	7	12	13	20	16
U.S. Open	1	1	2	6	8	12	16	14
The Open Championship	0	0	0	0	0	1	1	1
PGA Championship	0	0	2	4	6	8	9	9
Totals	1	3	6	17	26	34	46	40

- Most consecutive cuts made – 30 (1942 PGA Championship – 1957 Masters)
- Longest streak of top-10s – 8 (1950 Masters – 1952 U.S. Open)

== U.S. national team appearances ==
- Ryder Cup: 1947 (winners), 1949 (winners), 1951 (winners), 1953 (winners)
- Lakes International Cup: 1952 (winners)
- Hopkins Trophy: 1955 (winners)

== See also ==
- List of golfers with most PGA Tour wins
