= Ralph Guldahl =

American professional golfer (1911–1987)

Personal information
- Full name: Ralph J. Guldahl
- Nationality: United States
- Born: November 22, 1911 Dallas, Texas, U.S.
- Died: June 11, 1987 (aged 75) Sherman Oaks, California, U.S.
- Height: 6 ft 2 in (1.88 m)
- Weight: 175 lb (79 kg; 12.5 st)
- Spouse: Laverne
- Children: 1

Career
- Sport: Golf
- Turned professional: 1931
- Former tour: PGA Tour
- Professional wins: 16

Number of wins by tour
- PGA Tour: 16

Best results in major championships (wins: 3)
- Masters Tournament: Won: 1939
- PGA Championship: T3: 1940
- U.S. Open: Won: 1937, 1938
- The Open Championship: T11: 1937

Achievements and awards
- World Golf Hall of Fame: 1981 (member page)

Ralph J. Guldahl (November 22, 1911 – June 11, 1987) was an American professional golfer, one of the top five players in the sport from 1936 to 1940. He won sixteen PGA Tour-sanctioned tournaments, including three majors championships (two U.S. Opens and one Masters).

== Early life ==
In 1911, Guldahl was born in Dallas, Texas. In 1930, Guldahl graduated of Woodrow Wilson High School.

== Professional career ==
In 1931, Guldahl turned professional. He won an event in his rookie season before turning 20 years of age, setting a record that would not be matched until 2013. In 1933, at the age of 21, Guldahl went into the last hole of the U.S. Open tied for the lead with Johnny Goodman. A par would have taken him into a playoff but he made bogey and finished second. After further frustrating failures, Guldahl quit the sport temporarily in 1935 and became a car salesman.

Guldahl made a comeback part way through the next PGA Tour season in 1936, won the prestigious Western Open and finished second on the money list. He won the Western Open in 1937 and 1938 as well. That tournament was recognized as one of the world's most important events at the time, on the level of a major championship or close to it.

Guldahl's manner of play was relaxed: "He paused to comb his hair before every hole, and would forestall any suspense by announcing exactly where he intended to plant the ball."

Guldahl won three major championships. He claimed the 1937 U.S. Open with a then-record score of 281. He successfully defended the national title a win at the 1938 U.S. Open. He was the last to win the U.S. Open while wearing a necktie during play in 1938. Guldahl was runner-up at the 1937 Masters Tournament and 1938 Masters Tournament. He played on the 1937 Ryder Cup team.

Guldahl reached the top in golf ahead of more famous players of his generation, including Sam Snead and fellow Texans Byron Nelson, Ben Hogan, and Jimmy Demaret, who all went on to build much longer and more productive pro careers. Guldahl's 16 PGA Tour wins all came in a ten-year span between 1931 and 1940. He put together five straight seasons, from 1936 to 1940, with multiple PGA Tour titles.

Guldahl was offered a book contract for a guide to golf, taking two months to complete Groove Your Golf, a book that used high-speed photographs of Guldahl on each page to create "flip-book" movies. After completing the book in 1939, he returned to the PGA Tour. His last two wins came in 1940. Two-time PGA champion Paul Runyan commented, "It's the most ridiculous thing, really. Guldahl went from being temporarily the best player in the world to one who couldn't play at all." His son, Ralph, claimed that his father over-analyzed his swing and it fell apart. According to his wife, Laverne: "When he sat down to write that book, that's when he lost his game."

In an interview with The New York Times in 1979, Guldahl himself offered a different explanation for the slump in his game. When asked about destroying his talent by practicing in front of a mirror while writing the book, he responded: "Nonsense. No such thing ever happened." During the interview, he offered several reasons for retiring: he was tired of life on the road; he wanted more time with his family; and the wartime slowdown in tournaments caused his game to grow rusty and he had little inclination to train: "I never did have a tremendous desire to win."

Paul Collins summed up Guldahl's decision to retire with these words: "Guldahl's fate had little to do with overthinking his game, and much to do with the untutored Dallas boy who once loved to play abandoned courses and baseball diamonds alone. Far more than fame, what Ralph Guldahl wanted was a nice, quiet game of golf." Guldahl played occasionally in the 1940s but then quit tournament golf for good, except for several seasons in the 1960s, when he played in the Masters, as an eligible past champion, without notable success.

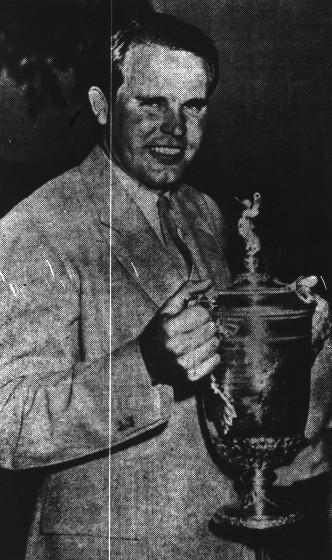
Guldahl with 1937 U.S. Open trophy.

He spent the rest of his working life as a club professional. In 1961, he became the club pro at the new Braemar Country Club in Tarzana, California, where he was an instructor until his death. Among his students was billionaire Howard Hughes.

== Personal life ==
In 1987, at the age of 75, Guldahl died in Sherman Oaks, California.

== Award and honors ==
- In 1980, Guldahl was inducted into the Texas Golf Hall of Fame.
- He is also a member of the Texas Sports Hall of Fame.
- In 1981, Guldahl was inducted into the World Golf Hall of Fame.
- In 1989, he was inducted into the Woodrow Wilson High School Hall of Fame. The induction part of a celebration of the school's 60th anniversary.

== Professional wins (16) ==
=== PGA Tour wins (16) ===
- 1931 (1) Santa Monica Open
- 1932 (1) Arizona Open
- 1934 (1) Westwood Golf Club Open Championship
- 1936 (3) Western Open, Augusta Open, Miami Biltmore Open
- 1937 (2) **U.S. Open**, Western Open
- 1938 (2) **U.S. Open**, Western Open
- 1939 (4) Greater Greensboro Open, **Masters Tournament**, Dapper Dan Open, Miami Biltmore International Four-Ball (with Sam Snead)
- 1940 (2) Milwaukee Open, Inverness Invitational Four-Ball (with Sam Snead)

Major championships wins are shown in bold.

== Major championships ==
=== Wins (3) ===
Year	Championship	54 holes	Winning score	Margin	Runner-up
1937	U.S. Open	1 shot deficit	−7 (71-69-72-69=281)	2 strokes	(United States) Sam Snead
1938	U.S. Open (2)	4 shot deficit	E (74-70-71-69=284)	6 strokes	(United States) Dick Metz
1939	Masters Tournament	1 shot lead	−9 (72-68-70-69=279)	1 stroke	(United States) Sam Snead

=== Results timeline ===
Tournament	1930	1931	1932	1933	1934	1935	1936	1937	1938	1939
Masters Tournament	NYF	NYF	NYF	NYF				2	T2	**1**
U.S. Open	T39	T32	T58	2	T8	T40	T8	**1**	**1**	T7
The Open Championship								T11		
PGA Championship								R32	R32	R32

Tournament	1940	1941	1942	1943	1944	1945	1946	1947	1948	1949
Masters Tournament	T14	T14	21	NT	NT	NT	48		T35	
U.S. Open	T5	T21	NT	NT	NT	NT	CUT	T55	T32	22
The Open Championship	NT	NT	NT	NT	NT	NT				
PGA Championship	SF	R16		NT						

Tournament	1950	1951	1952	1953	1954	1955	1956	1957	1958	1959
Masters Tournament										
U.S. Open										
The Open Championship										
PGA Championship										

Tournament	1960	1961	1962	1963	1964	1965	1966	1967	1968	1969
Masters Tournament					CUT	CUT		CUT	CUT	CUT
U.S. Open										
The Open Championship										
PGA Championship										

Tournament	1970	1971	1972	1973
Masters Tournament	CUT	CUT	CUT	CUT
U.S. Open				
The Open Championship				
PGA Championship				

Win
Top 10
Did not play

NYF = tournament not yet founded
NT = no tournament
CUT = missed the half-way cut
R64, R32, R16, QF, SF = Round in which player lost in PGA Championship match play
"T" indicates a tie for a place

=== Summary ===
Tournament	Wins	2nd	3rd	Top-5	Top-10	Top-25	Events	Cuts made
Masters Tournament	1	2	0	3	3	6	17	8
U.S. Open	2	1	0	4	7	9	16	15
The Open Championship	0	0	0	0	0	1	1	1
PGA Championship	0	0	1	1	2	5	5	5
Totals	3	3	1	8	12	21	39	29

- Most consecutive cuts made – 25 (1930 U.S. Open – 1946 Masters)
- Longest streak of top-10s – 2 (five times)

== See also ==
- List of golfers with most PGA Tour wins
- List of men's major championships winning golfers
