= Lawson Little =

American professional golfer (1910–1968)

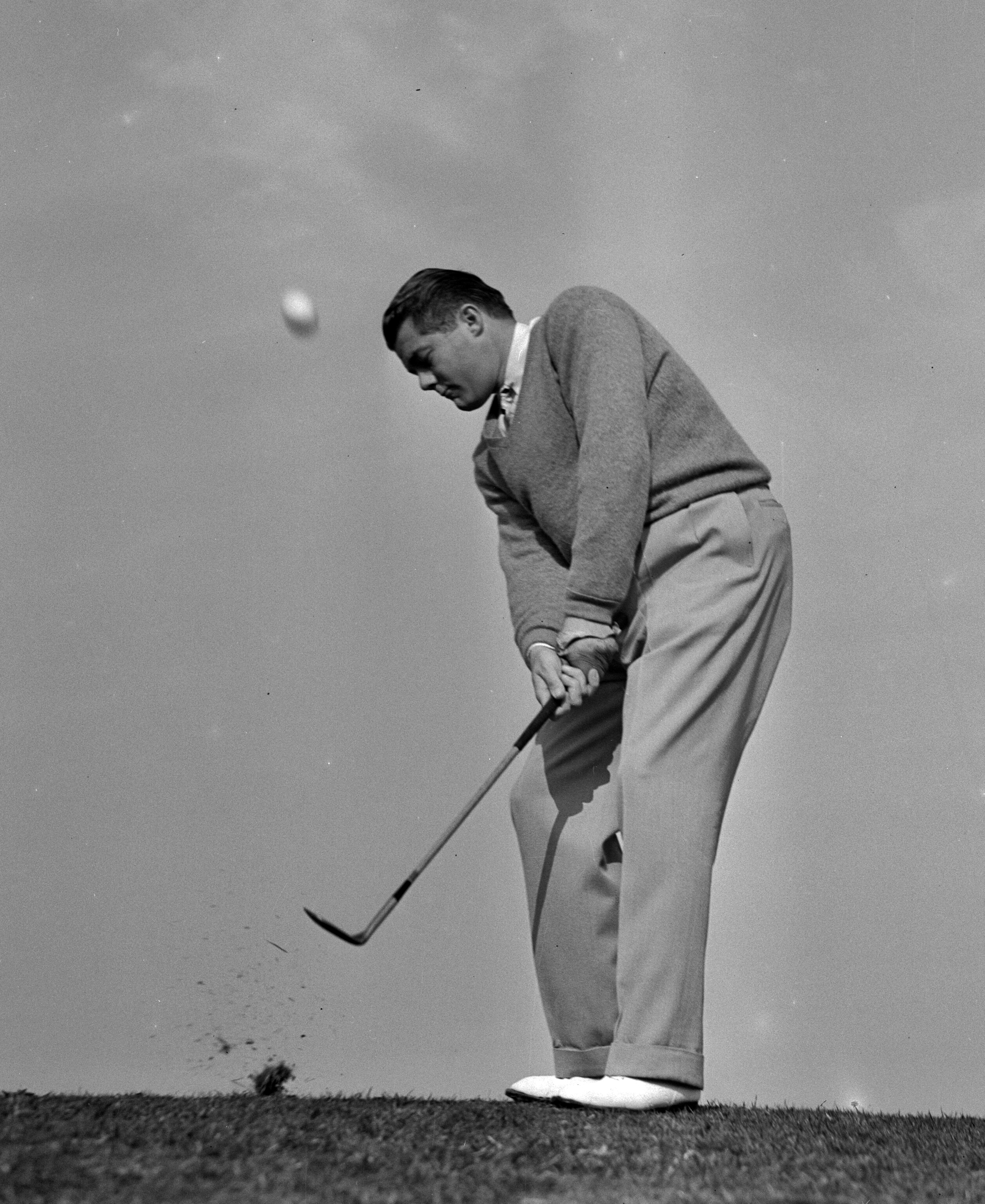
- Little in 1939

Personal information
- Full name: William Lawson Little Jr.
- Nickname: Cannonball
- Nationality: United States
- Born: June 23, 1910 Fort Adams, Newport, Rhode Island, U.S.
- Died: February 1, 1968 (aged 57) Monterey, California, U.S.
- Height: 5 ft 9 in (1.75 m)
- Weight: 200 lb (91 kg; 14 st)
- Spouse: Dorothy Hurd (m. 1936–1968)
- Children: 4

Career
- Sport: Golf
- College: Stanford University
- Turned professional: 1936
- Former tour: PGA Tour
- Professional wins: 9

Number of wins by tour
- PGA Tour: 8

Best results in major championships (wins: 5)
- Masters Tournament: T3: 1939
- PGA Championship: T17: 1946, 1951
- U.S. Open: Won: 1940
- The Open Championship: T4: 1935
- U.S. Amateur: Won: 1934, 1935
- British Amateur: Won: 1934, 1935

Achievements and awards
- World Golf Hall of Fame: 1980 (member page)
- James E. Sullivan Award: 1935

William Lawson Little Jr. (June 23, 1910 – February 1, 1968) was an American professional golfer who also had a distinguished amateur career.

== Early life ==
In 1910, Little was born in Newport, Rhode Island. He lived much of his early life in the San Francisco area, where his father was an Army Colonel stationed at the Presidio of San Francisco.

== Amateur career ==
Little was one of the most dominant amateur players in the history of the sport, capturing both the British Amateur and the U.S. Amateur, then regarded as major championships, consecutively in 1934 and 1935. This feat was referred to as the "Little Slam". He remains the only player to have won both titles in the same year more than once. Little's winning margin of 14 and 13 in the 1934 British final remains the record for dominance. Bob Dickson, Harold Hilton and Bobby Jones are the only other golfers to have won the two titles in the same year.

Little attended Stanford University. He was a student of golf instructor Ernest Jones.

== Professional career ==
In 1936, Little turned professional. He won eight times on the PGA Tour including one professional major, the 1940 U.S. Open. Little spent much of his early professional career traveling the country with Bobby Jones and fellow golfers Horton Smith, Jimmy Thomson, and Harry Cooper with the intentions of growing the game of golf in a Spaulding-sponsored effort called The Keystones of Golf. He carried up to 26 clubs in his bag, and this prompted the United States Golf Association to introduce the 14-club limit in 1938.

== Personal life ==
Little raised his family in a house that sat on Fairway One of the Pebble Beach golf course and stayed actively involved in the golf world well into his twilight years.

He was an active photographer and sports writer for many publications and would hold golf clinics at the Masters and Crosby events.

Little died in 1968 of a heart attack at his home in Monterey, California, at the age of 57.

== Awards and honors ==
- In 1935, Little won the James E. Sullivan Award for outstanding amateur athlete.
- He is a member of the Stanford Athletic Hall of Fame
- In 1980, Little was inducted into the World Golf Hall of Fame.

== Amateur wins ==
- 1928 Northern California Amateur Championship
- 1931 Northern California Championship, Denver, Colorado Invitational Championship
- 1933 Pacific Coast Intercollegiate Championship, Broadmoor Invitational, Colorado State Amateur Championship
- 1934 **British Amateur**, Pacific Coast Intercollegiate Championship, **U.S. Amateur**
- 1935 **British Amateur**, **U.S. Amateur**

Amateur major championships are shown in bold.

== Professional wins ==
=== PGA Tour wins (8) ===
- 1936 (1) Canadian Open
- 1937 (2) Shawnee Open, San Francisco National Match Play Open
- 1940 (2) **U.S. Open**, Los Angeles Open
- 1941 (1) Texas Open
- 1942 (1) Inverness Invitational Four-Ball (with Lloyd Mangrum)
- 1948 (1) St. Petersburg Open

Professional major championship is shown in bold.

=== Other wins ===
- 1934 Northern California Open (as an amateur)

== Major championships ==
=== Professional wins (1) ===
Year	Championship	54 holes	Winning score	Margin	Runner-up
1940	U.S. Open	1 shot deficit	−1 (72-69-73-73=287)	Playoff ^{1}	(United States) Gene Sarazen

^{1} Defeated Sarazen in an 18-hole playoff - Little 70 (−2), Sarazen 73 (+1).

=== Amateur wins (4) ===
Year	Championship	Winning score	Runner-up
1934	U.S. Amateur	8 & 7	(United States) David Goldman
1934	British Amateur	14 & 13	(Scotland) James Wallace
1935	U.S. Amateur	4 & 2	(United States) Walter Emery
1935	British Amateur	1 up	(England) William Tweddell

=== Results timeline ===
Amateur

Tournament	1929	1930	1931	1932	1933	1934	1935
U.S. Amateur	QF	R16	DNQ	R32	SF	**1**	**1**
The Amateur Championship						**1**	**1**

Professional

Tournament	1934	1935	1936	1937	1938	1939
Masters Tournament		6 LA	T20	T19	T10	T3
U.S. Open	T25 LA			CUT	T38	T42
The Open Championship		T4 LA				CUT
PGA Championship						

Tournament	1940	1941	1942	1943	1944	1945	1946	1947	1948	1949
Masters Tournament	T19	8	T7	NT	NT	NT	T21	T14	T40	T23
U.S. Open	**1**	T17	NT	NT	NT	NT	T10	T31	CUT	CUT
The Open Championship	NT	NT	NT	NT	NT	NT	10		T32	
PGA Championship				NT			R32		R64	R64

Tournament	1950	1951	1952	1953	1954	1955	1956	1957
Masters Tournament	9	6	WD		T38	65	T72	T28
U.S. Open	CUT	CUT	CUT	T45	T35	CUT		
The Open Championship								
PGA Championship		R32	R64					

Win
Top 10
Did not play

LA = low amateur
NT = no tournament
WD = withdrew
CUT = missed the half-way cut
DNQ = did not qualify for match play portion of U.S. Amateur
R64, R32, R16, QF, SF = round in which player lost in match play
"T" indicates a tie for a place

Sources: Masters, U.S. Open and U.S. Amateur, British Open

=== Summary ===
Tournament	Wins	2nd	3rd	Top-5	Top-10	Top-25	Events	Cuts made
Masters Tournament	0	0	1	1	7	13	19	18
U.S. Open	1	0	0	1	2	4	16	9
The Open Championship	0	0	0	1	2	2	4	3
PGA Championship	0	0	0	0	0	2	5	5
Totals	1	0	1	3	11	21	44	35

- Most consecutive cuts made – 13 (1940 Masters – 1948 PGA)
- Longest streak of top-10s – 2 (three times)

== U.S. national team appearances ==
Amateur

- Walker Cup: 1934 (winners)

== See also ==
- List of golfers with most PGA Tour wins
