= Felix Serafin =

American professional golfer (1905–1966)

Personal information
- Nationality: United States
- Born: May 23, 1905 Wilkes-Barre, Pennsylvania, U.S.
- Died: August 9, 1966 (aged 61) Kingston, Pennsylvania, U.S.

Career
- Sport: Golf
- Status: Professional
- Former tour: PGA Tour
- Professional wins: 4

Number of wins by tour
- PGA Tour: 4

Best results in major championships
- Masters Tournament: T6: 1938
- PGA Championship: T9: 1938
- U.S. Open: T20: 1940
- The Open Championship: DNP

Felix Serafin (May 23, 1905 – August 9, 1966) was an American professional golfer.

== Career ==
In 1905, Serafin was born in Wilkes-Barre, Pennsylvania. He made his living as a club professional while occasionally playing on the early PGA Tour; and won four times on tour.

Serafin's best finish in a major was a tie for sixth at the 1938 Masters Tournament. He also reached the round of 16 at the 1939 PGA Championship, then a match play event.

== Professional wins (4) ==
=== PGA Tour wins (4) ===
- 1931 Pennsylvania Open Championship
- 1933 East Falls Open
- 1936 Pennsylvania Open Championship
- 1939 Hershey Open
