= Tony Manero (golfer) =

American professional golfer (1905–1989)

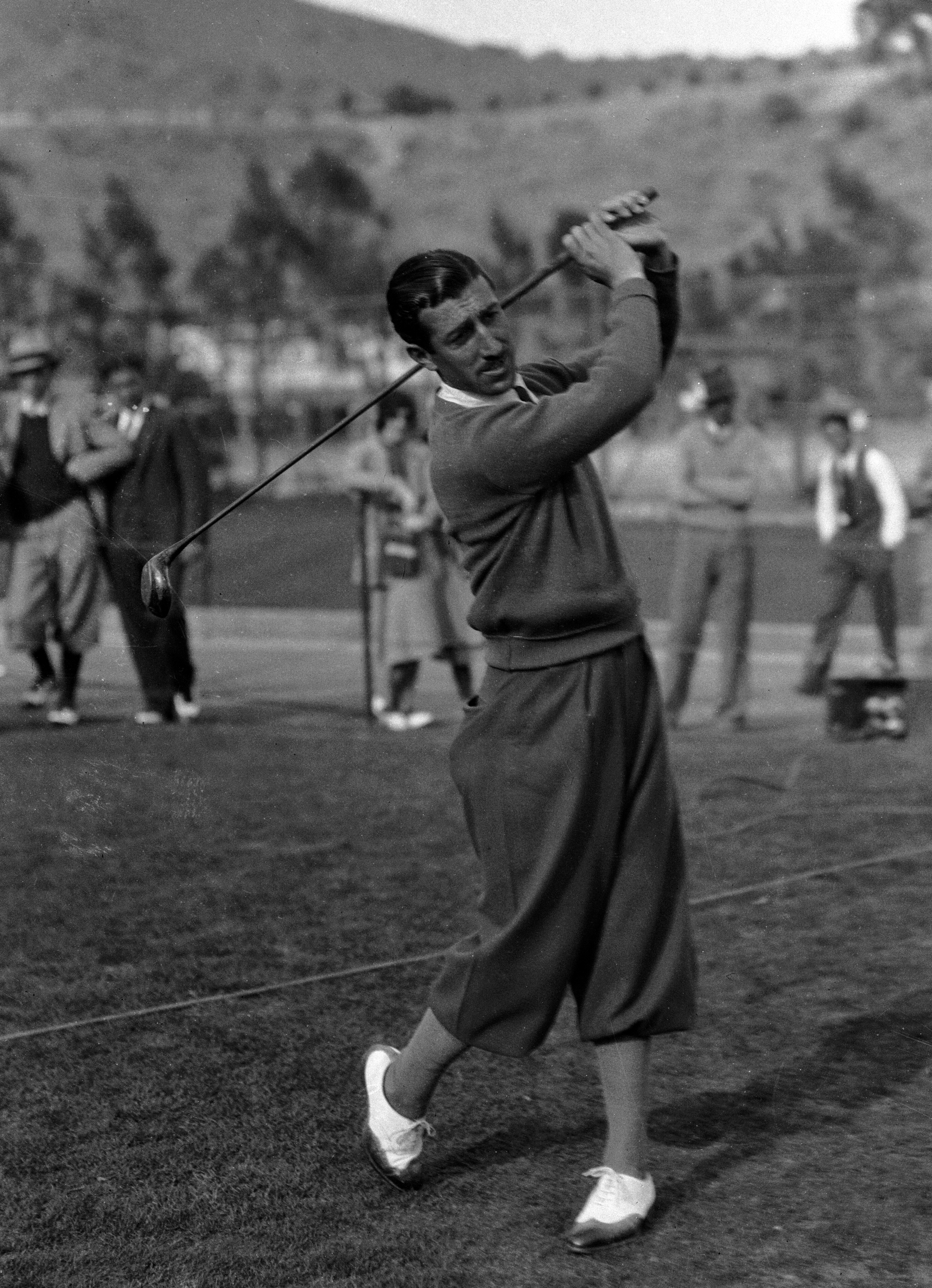
- Manero in 1929

Personal information
- Full name: Anthony T. Manero
- Nationality: United States
- Born: April 4, 1905 New York, New York, U.S.
- Died: October 22, 1989 (aged 84) Greenwich, Connecticut, U.S.

Career
- Sport: Golf
- Turned professional: 1929
- Former tour: PGA Tour
- Professional wins: 14

Number of wins by tour
- PGA Tour: 8
- Other: 6

Best results in major championships (wins: 1)
- Masters Tournament: T13: 1937
- PGA Championship: T3: 1937
- U.S. Open: Won: 1936
- The Open Championship: CUT: 1931, 1937

Anthony T. Manero (April 4, 1905 – October 22, 1989) was an American professional golfer.

== Career ==
In 1905, Manero was born in New York City.

Manero won eight times on the PGA Tour including one major championship, the 1936 U.S. Open. He played on the 1937 Ryder Cup team.

Shortly thereafter, Manero became the club pro at Salem Country Club. He split the position over ten years with Joe Stein.

In 1989, he died at the age of 84 in Greenwich, Connecticut.

== Awards and honors ==
In 1964, Manero was inducted into the Connecticut Golf Hall of Fame.

== Professional wins (14) ==
=== PGA Tour wins (8) ===
- 1929 (1) Catalina Open
- 1930 (3) Glens Falls Open, Catalina Open, Pasadena Open
- 1932 (1) Westchester Open
- 1935 (1) General Brock Hotel Open
- 1936 (1) **U.S. Open**
- 1938 (1) Glens Falls Open

Major championship is shown in bold.

=== Other wins ===
(this list may be incomplete)

- 1934 Carolinas Open
- 1937 Carolinas Open, New Hampshire Open
- 1939 New Hampshire Open (tie with John Thoren)
- 1941 New Hampshire Open
- 1948 Westchester Open

== Major championships ==
=== Wins (1) ===
Year	Championship	54 holes	Winning score	Margin	Runner-up
1936	U.S. Open	4 shot deficit	6 (73-69-73-67=282)	2 strokes	(United States) Harry Cooper

=== Results timeline ===
Tournament	1927	1928	1929
U.S. Open		T41	CUT
The Open Championship			
PGA Championship	R16	R32	QF

Tournament	1930	1931	1932	1933	1934	1935	1936	1937	1938	1939
Masters Tournament	NYF	NYF	NYF	NYF	WD	T45		T13	T27	T26
U.S. Open		T19	T45	T29	CUT	T40	**1**	T40	48	T56
The Open Championship		CUT						CUT		
PGA Championship						R16	QF	SF	R32	R32

Tournament	1940	1941	1942	1943	1944	1945	1946	1947	1948	1949
Masters Tournament	T29	T44		NT	NT	NT				
U.S. Open	T36	CUT	NT	NT	NT	NT	CUT	WD	CUT	CUT
The Open Championship	NT	NT	NT	NT	NT	NT				
PGA Championship				NT	R16					R64

Tournament	1950	1951	1952	1953	1954	1955	1956	1957	1958	1959
Masters Tournament						WD	WD	CUT	CUT	CUT
U.S. Open	CUT	CUT			CUT					
The Open Championship										
PGA Championship										

Tournament	1960	1961	1962
Masters Tournament	CUT	CUT	WD
U.S. Open			
The Open Championship			
PGA Championship			

Win
Top 10
Did not play

NYF = tournament not yet founded
NT = no tournament
WD = withdrew
CUT = missed the half-way cut
R64, R32, R16, QF, SF =round in which player lost in PGA Championship match play
"T" indicates a tie for a place.

=== Summary ===
Tournament	Wins	2nd	3rd	Top-5	Top-10	Top-25	Events	Cuts made
Masters Tournament	0	0	0	0	0	1	15	6
U.S. Open	1	0	0	1	1	2	20	10
The Open Championship	0	0	0	0	0	0	2	0
PGA Championship	0	0	1	3	6	9	10	10
Totals	1	0	1	4	7	12	47	26

- Most consecutive cuts made – 9 (1938 Masters – 1941 Masters)
- Longest streak of top-10s – 3 (1935 PGA – 1936 PGA)
