= Ray Mangrum =

American golfer

Personal information
- Full name: Ray B. Mangrum
- Nationality: United States
- Born: June 17, 1910 Texas, U.S.
- Died: April 2, 1975 (aged 64) California, U.S.

Career
- Sport: Golf
- Status: Professional
- Former tour: PGA Tour
- Professional wins: 8

Number of wins by tour
- PGA Tour: 6

Best results in major championships
- Masters Tournament: T6: 1936
- PGA Championship: T9: 1938
- U.S. Open: T4: 1935
- The Open Championship: DNP

Ray B. Mangrum (June 17, 1910 – April 2, 1975) was an American professional golfer and the older brother of a more famous golfer, Lloyd Mangrum.

== Career ==
Mangrum began his golf career in the 1920s as a club professional in Dallas, Texas, eventually becoming the head professional at Cliff-Dale Country Club. He and Lloyd moved from Texas to Los Angeles in the 1930s hoping that the move would raise their visibility and enhance their careers. In Los Angeles in the 1940s, Mangrum mentored Ted Rhodes, a trailblazing African-American golfer.

Mangrum won five PGA Tour events in the 1930s and 1940s. His best finishes in major championships were T4 at the 1935 U.S. Open and T6 at the Masters.

== Professional wins (8) ==
=== PGA Tour wins (6) ===
- 1934 (1) Sunset Fields Open
- 1936 (2) Wildwood Open, Portland Open
- 1937 (1) Miami Open (January)
- 1945 (1) Tucson Open
- 1946 (1) Pensacola Open

=== Other wins (2) ===
- 1935 Pennsylvania Open Championship
- 1939 Pennsylvania Open Championship
