= Billy Burke (golfer) =

American professional golfer (1902–1972)

Personal information
- Full name: William John Burke
- Nationality: United States
- Born: December 14, 1902 Naugatuck, Connecticut, U.S.
- Died: April 19, 1972 (aged 69) Clearwater, Florida, U.S.
- Height: 5 ft 11.5 in (1.82 m)
- Weight: 172 lb (78 kg; 12.3 st)

Career
- Sport: Golf
- Status: Professional
- Former tour: PGA Tour
- Professional wins: 17

Number of wins by tour
- PGA Tour: 11
- Other: 6

Best results in major championships (wins: 1)
- Masters Tournament: T3: 1934, 1939
- PGA Championship: T3: 1931
- U.S. Open: Won: 1931
- The Open Championship: DNP

William John Burke, Burkauskas (polonized Burkowski) (December 14, 1902 – April 19, 1972) was an American professional golfer during the early 20th century.

== Early life ==
Burke was born in Naugatuck, Connecticut. He was of Lithuanian descent.

== Professional career ==
His greatest season was 1931, when he won the U.S. Open, reached the semi-finals of the PGA Championship, and won four events on the professional circuit, plus appeared on the Ryder Cup team where he was undefeated in two matches. He was also selected for the 1933 Ryder Cup team but not before some agitation by Gene Sarazen was done on his behalf. Burke won his only match in the 1933 competition.

Burke's 1931 U.S. Open win came in a marathon playoff. He and George Von Elm were tied at 292 (8-over-par) after regulation play. They played a 36-hole playoff the next day and tied again at 149 (7-over-par). The following day they played 36 more holes and Burke emerged victorious 148 to 149.

Throughout Burke's golf career he used an unorthodox grip due to the loss of two fingers on his left hand.

== Personal life ==
Burke served as head golf professional at The Country Club in Pepper Pike, Ohio, for 29 years, beginning in 1934. He also holds the club's course record: a 63.

Burke died in Clearwater, Florida in 1972.

== Honors and awards ==
- In 1963, Burke was inducted into the Connecticut Golf Hall of Fame.
- In 2005, Burke was inducted into the National Polish-American Sports Hall of Fame.

== Professional wins (17) ==
=== PGA Tour wins (11) ===
- 1927 (2) Florida Open, Central Florida Open
- 1928 (1) North and South Open
- 1929 (2) New York State Open, Glens Falls Open
- 1931 (2) **U.S. Open**, Glens Falls Open
- 1932 (1) Florida West Coast Open
- 1935 (1) The Cascades Open
- 1936 (1) Centennial Open
- 1940 (1) Miami Biltmore International Four-Ball (with Craig Wood)

Major championship is shown in bold.

=== Other wins (6) ===
this list may be incomplete

- 1930 Mid South Open
- 1938 Ohio Open
- 1939 Ohio Open, Walter Hagen 25th Anniversary (with Ed Dudley)
- 1945 Ohio Open
- 1955 Ohio Open

== Major championships ==
=== Wins (1) ===
Year	Championship	54 holes	Winning score	Margin	Runner-up
1931	U.S. Open	2 shot deficit	+8 (73-72-74-73=292)	Playoff ^{1}	(United States) George Von Elm

^{1} Defeated George Von Elm in a playoff. First 36-hole playoff - Burke 73-76=149 (+7), Von Elm 75-74=149 (+7). Second 36-hole playoff - Burke 71-77=148 (+6), Von Elm 76-73=149 (+7).

=== Results timeline ===
Tournament	1928	1929
U.S. Open	T18	15
PGA Championship	R32	

Tournament	1930	1931	1932	1933	1934	1935	1936	1937	1938	1939
Masters Tournament	NYF	NYF	NYF	NYF	T3	T37	28	T29	T13	T3
U.S. Open	T28	**1**	T7	T33	T6	T32	T18	T16	WD	T42
PGA Championship	R32	SF				R64	R16	R32	R16	R16

Tournament	1940	1941	1942	1943	1944	1945	1946	1947	1948	1949
Masters Tournament	WD		T23	NT	NT	NT	46	57	T43	T35
U.S. Open		WD	NT	NT	NT	NT	T45	T27		CUT
PGA Championship	R32			NT						

Tournament	1950	1951	1952	1953	1954	1955	1956	1957	1958	1959
Masters Tournament	T29		WD	WD		T36	WD	WD	CUT	CUT
U.S. Open	CUT	CUT			CUT					
PGA Championship										

Tournament	1960	1961	1962
Masters Tournament	CUT	CUT	WD
U.S. Open			
PGA Championship			

Note: Burke never played in The Open Championship.

wIN
Top 10
Did not play

NYF = tournament not yet founded
NT = no tournament
WD = withdrew
CUT = missed the half-way cut
R64, R32, R16, QF, SF = round in which player lost in PGA Championship match play
"T" indicates a tie for a place

=== Summary ===
Tournament	Wins	2nd	3rd	Top-5	Top-10	Top-25	Events	Cuts made
Masters Tournament	0	0	2	2	2	4	23	13
U.S. Open	1	0	0	1	3	7	19	13
The Open Championship	0	0	0	0	0	0	0	0
PGA Championship	0	0	1	1	4	8	9	9
Totals	1	0	3	4	9	19	51	35

- Most consecutive cuts made – 12 (1934 Masters – 1938 Masters)
- Longest streak of top-10s – 3 (1931 U.S. Open – 1932 U.S. Open)

== See also ==
- List of golfers with most PGA Tour wins
