= Ky Laffoon =

American professional golfer (1908–1984)

Personal information
- Nationality: United States
- Born: December 23, 1908 Zinc, Arkansas, U.S.
- Died: March 17, 1984 (aged 75) Springfield, Missouri, U.S.

Career
- Sport: Golf
- Turned professional: 1930
- Former tour: PGA Tour
- Professional wins: 12

Number of wins by tour
- PGA Tour: 9
- Other: 3

Best results in major championships
- Masters Tournament: T4: 1946
- PGA Championship: T3: 1937
- U.S. Open: T5: 1936
- The Open Championship: DNP

Ky Laffoon (December 23, 1908 – March 17, 1984) was an American professional golfer. (Birthdate also stated as December 24, 1907.)

== Career ==
In 1908, Laffoon was born in Zinc, Arkansas

He won nine times on the PGA Tour, with four of the victories coming in 1934. He played on the 1935 Ryder Cup team.

In 1939, his wife Irene threatened to leave him if he could not control his temper on golf course. Next tournament after two rounds he came to 15th hole and his ball was buried in honeysuckle. After missing three shots, he starting shouting cuss words that all the spectators could hear. His wife was one of the spectators and headed for the clubhouse after the outburst. Ky ran after her and pleaded that he wasn't cussing at his golf game, he just hates honeysuckle.

In 1984, he died in Springfield, Missouri.

== In popular culture ==
The song by Honky Tonk artist Dan Whitaker and written by Pete Covitz entitled "Ky Laffoon's Last Stand" documents his life.

== Professional wins ==
=== PGA Tour wins (9) ===
- 1933 (1) Nebraska Open
- 1934 (4) Atlanta Open, Hershey Open, Glens Falls Open, Eastern Open Championship
- 1935 (1) Phoenix Open
- 1936 (1) Inverness Invitational Four-Ball (with Walter Hagen)
- 1938 (1) Cleveland Open
- 1946 (1) Montgomery Invitational

=== Other wins ===
this list is probably incomplete

- 1933 Utah Open
- 1938 Miami International Four-Ball (with Dick Metz)
- 1950 Illinois PGA Championship

== Results in major championships ==
Tournament	1932	1933	1934	1935	1936	1937	1938	1939	1940	1941	1942	1943	1944	1945	1946	1947	1948
Masters Tournament	NYF	NYF	T18	T28	T6	5	T27	T22	WD			NT	NT	NT	T4	T33	T35
U.S. Open	CUT	T26	T23	T28	T5	T20	CUT	T9	DQ		NT	NT	NT	NT			
PGA Championship			R16	R16	R32	SF	R32	R32	R64		R16	NT		QF		QF	R16

Note: Laffoon never played in The Open Championship.

Top 10
Did not play

NYF = tournament not yet founded
NT = no tournament
WD = withdrew
DQ = disqualified
CUT = missed the half-way cut
R64, R32, R16, QF, SF = round in which player lost in PGA Championship match play
"T" indicates a tie for a place

=== Summary ===
Tournament	Wins	2nd	3rd	Top-5	Top-10	Top-25	Events	Cuts made
Masters Tournament	0	0	0	2	3	5	10	9
U.S. Open	0	0	0	1	2	4	9	6
The Open Championship	0	0	0	0	0	0	0	0
PGA Championship	0	0	1	3	7	10	11	11
Totals	0	0	1	6	12	19	30	26

- Most consecutive cuts made – 14 (1933 U.S. Open – 1938 Masters)
- Longest streak of top-10s – 3 (1935 PGA – 1936 U.S. Open)
