= Harry Cooper (golfer) =

English-American golfer (1904–2000)

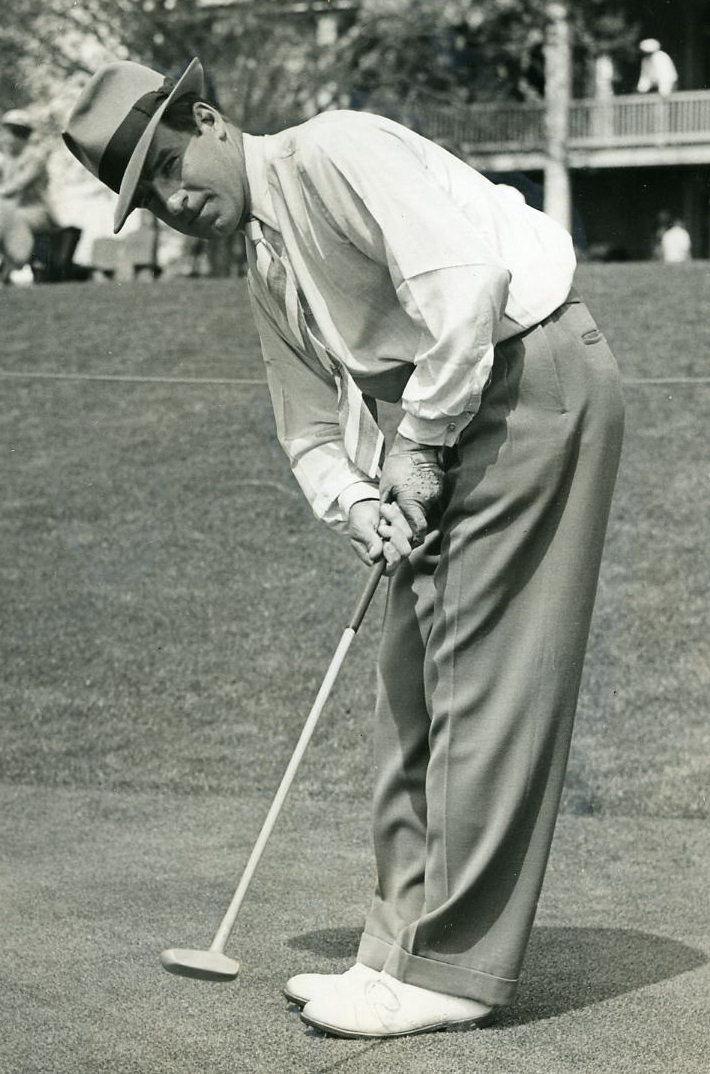
- Cooper at the 1936 Masters Tournament

Personal information
- Full name: Henry Edward Cooper
- Nickname: Lighthorse Harry
- Nationality: England; United States
- Born: August 4, 1904 Leatherhead, England
- Died: October 17, 2000 (aged 96) White Plains, New York, US
- Height: 5 ft 8.5 in (1.74 m)
- Weight: 152 lb (69 kg; 10.9 st)
- Spouse: Emma Buchanan Cooper (1910–2002)

Career
- Sport: Golf
- Turned professional: 1923
- Former tour: PGA Tour
- Professional wins: 36

Number of wins by tour
- PGA Tour: 30
- Other: 6

Best results in major championships
- Masters Tournament: 2nd/T2: 1936, 1938
- PGA Championship: T3: 1925
- U.S. Open: 2nd: 1927, 1936
- The Open Championship: DNP

Achievements and awards
- World Golf Hall of Fame: 1992 (member page)
- Vardon Trophy: 1937
- PGA Tour leading money winner: 1937

Henry Edward Cooper (August 4, 1904 – October 17, 2000) was an English-American PGA Tour golfer of the 1920s and 1930s. After he retired from competitive golf, he became a well-regarded instructor, into his 90s. In his long golf career he had 30 PGA Tour victories and was inducted into the World Golf Hall of Fame in 1992.

== Early life ==
Cooper was born in the town of Leatherhead, England. His father Syd was a professional golfer who had served as an apprentice to Old Tom Morris at St. Andrews. His mother, Alice Cooper, was also a golf professional, a very rare career for women in that era. His family moved to Texas when Cooper was young, and his father took a job as a club professional in Dallas.

== Golf career ==
Cooper honed his skills at Cedar Crest and turned professional in 1923. His first pro win, the Galveston Open in 1923, came before he turned twenty years of age. A perennial U.S. Open contender (with seven top-10 finishes and second place in 1927 and 1936), Cooper was nicknamed "Lighthorse Harry" by sportswriter Damon Runyon for his quick pace of play in winning the inaugural Los Angeles Open in 1926, completing the final 18 holes in 2.5 hours. (During the American Revolution, Lighthorse Harry Lee was a cavalry officer in the Continental Army, later the father of Confederate general Robert E. Lee.)

Cooper played in the inaugural Masters Tournament and placed second there in 1936 and 1938. He reached the semi-finals of the PGA Championship in 1925. In all, he finished in the top-10 11 times in major championships.

Cooper lost an 18-hole playoff to Tommy Armour for the 1927 U.S. Open title, at Oakmont Country Club. Armour had to make a birdie on the difficult 72nd hole, and did so with a long iron approach and a ten-foot putt, to tie Cooper, who had already finished.

At the U.S. Open in 1936 at Baltusrol Golf Club in Springfield, New Jersey, Cooper was involved in a highly controversial showdown with Tony Manero, who was suspected of cheating. Manero defeated Cooper, who had already finished with a then-record score, by two shots to win the tournament; over the final holes, Manero was apparently receiving assistance in club selection from Gene Sarazen, a top player and fellow Italian-American, who had already finished his round. The Rules of Golf were later modified to prevent this, specifying automatic disqualification for a player who received advice from anyone except his caddie.

His 30 PGA Tour titles are a record among players who never won a major championship, but Cooper did win the 1934 Western Open at a time when this event was one of the world's most important titles.

In later years, Cooper would say that he had a mental hangup during major tournaments and couldn't picture himself in the winner's circle. His greatest successes were in Canada, as he won the Canadian Open in 1932 and 1937. He won 30 PGA Tour titles in all and the inaugural Vardon Trophy in 1937; his 30 titles were a record for PGA Tour players born outside the U.S. until surpassed by Vijay Singh in 2008. He was active as a senior golfer, placing sixth in the 1955 Senior PGA Championship. He was inducted into the World Golf Hall of Fame in 1992.

Cooper was born in the United Kingdom, so he was ineligible to play for the U.S. in the Ryder Cup, although he had learned his golf in the U.S. after his family immigrated. This took him out of the chance for expenses-paid trips to Britain for that event and for the British Open on the same trip, a considerable setback, since travel costs to the U.K. were very high, and the prize money for the Open was very low during that era. Ironically, Cooper never competed in the British Open during his long career.

Cooper was the golf professional at Glen Oak Country Club in Glen Ellyn, Illinois from 1930 to 1937 and at Northmoor Country Club in Highland Park, Illinois from 1941 to 1942. He piled up many other titles, including wins in the first three tournaments held on Medinah Country Club's No. 3 Course. He advanced to the semifinals of the PGA Championship in 1925, falling to eventual champion Walter Hagen. Statistically, Cooper's best year was 1937, when he won eight times on Tour, and was both the leading money winner and the first winner of the Vardon Trophy.

== Later life ==
After his career on tour ended, Cooper became the head professional at the Metropolis Country Club in Greenburgh, New York. He held that position from 1953 to 1978. Following his retirement from Metropolis, he took a teaching position at Westchester Country Club in Rye, New York, where he remained until his death. He was remarkable for his ability to work in the golf industry into his nineties. When Cooper died, he was the longest-serving member of the PGA of America.

Starting in the 1950s, Cooper became the director of golf for Home Lines, sailing first on their ship the Homeric and later the Oceanic. They sailed between New York City and the Caribbean Sea each year from the Christmas season through to the spring when he would return to his club. Aboard ship he taught golf and ran daily golf clinics for the passengers and when they reached the islands he arranged golf on shore for the passengers.

Cooper is often classified as the greatest golfer who never won a major tournament, with 30 career wins. Some claim this classification is erroneous because Cooper won the 1934 Western Open, which many considered one of golf's major championships at that time. Although in its early decades the Western Open was widely regarded as a major championship, this designation was unofficial and it is generally not included in tallies of golfers' major championship wins. Other male professional golfers who have had a comparable record of repeated success at the major championships without winning one are Colin Montgomerie, Doug Sanders, Macdonald Smith, and Lee Westwood.

== Death and legacy ==
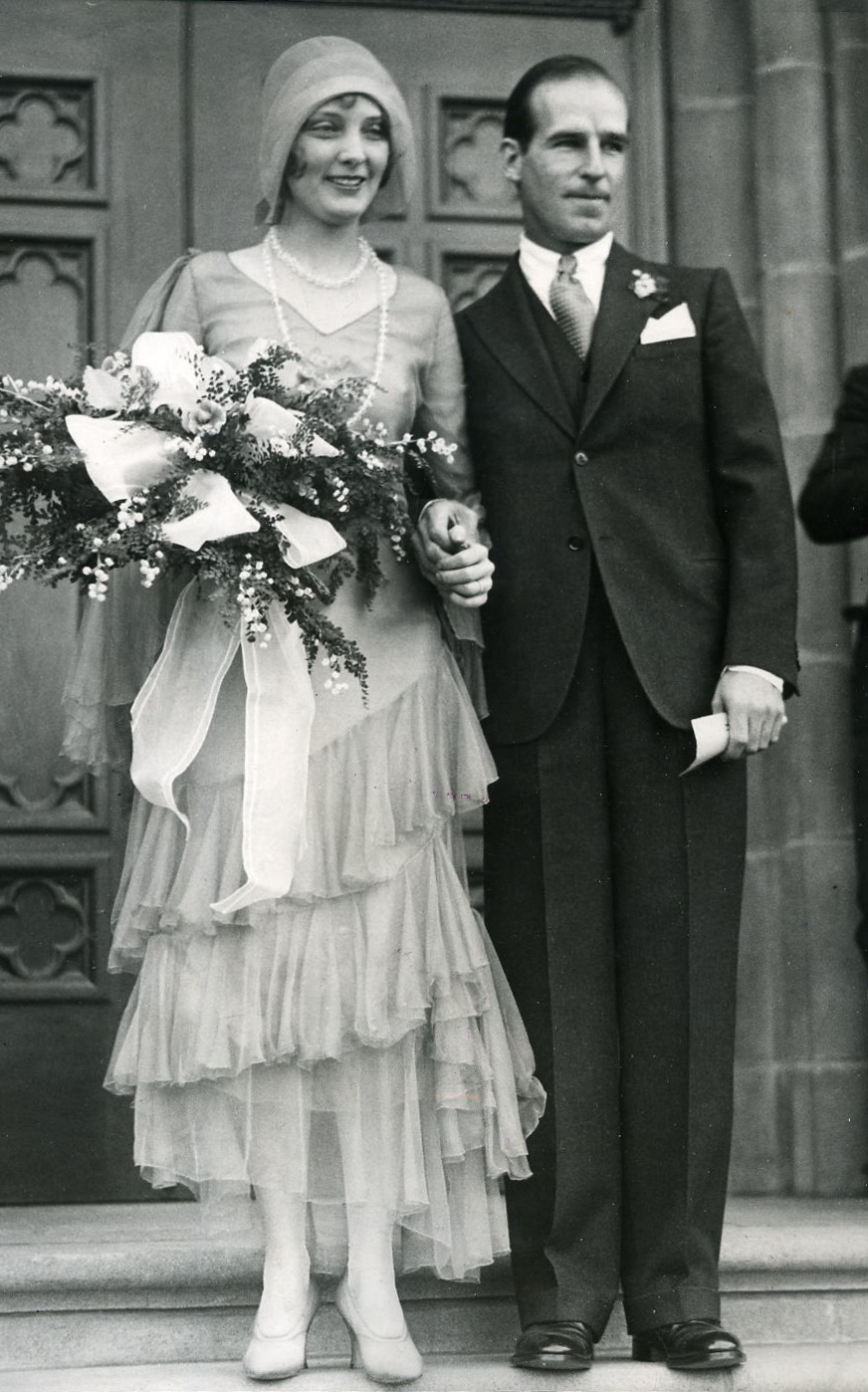
While playing at the Agua Caliente Open in January 1930, Cooper flew to Los Angeles to marry a local woman, Emma Buchanan.

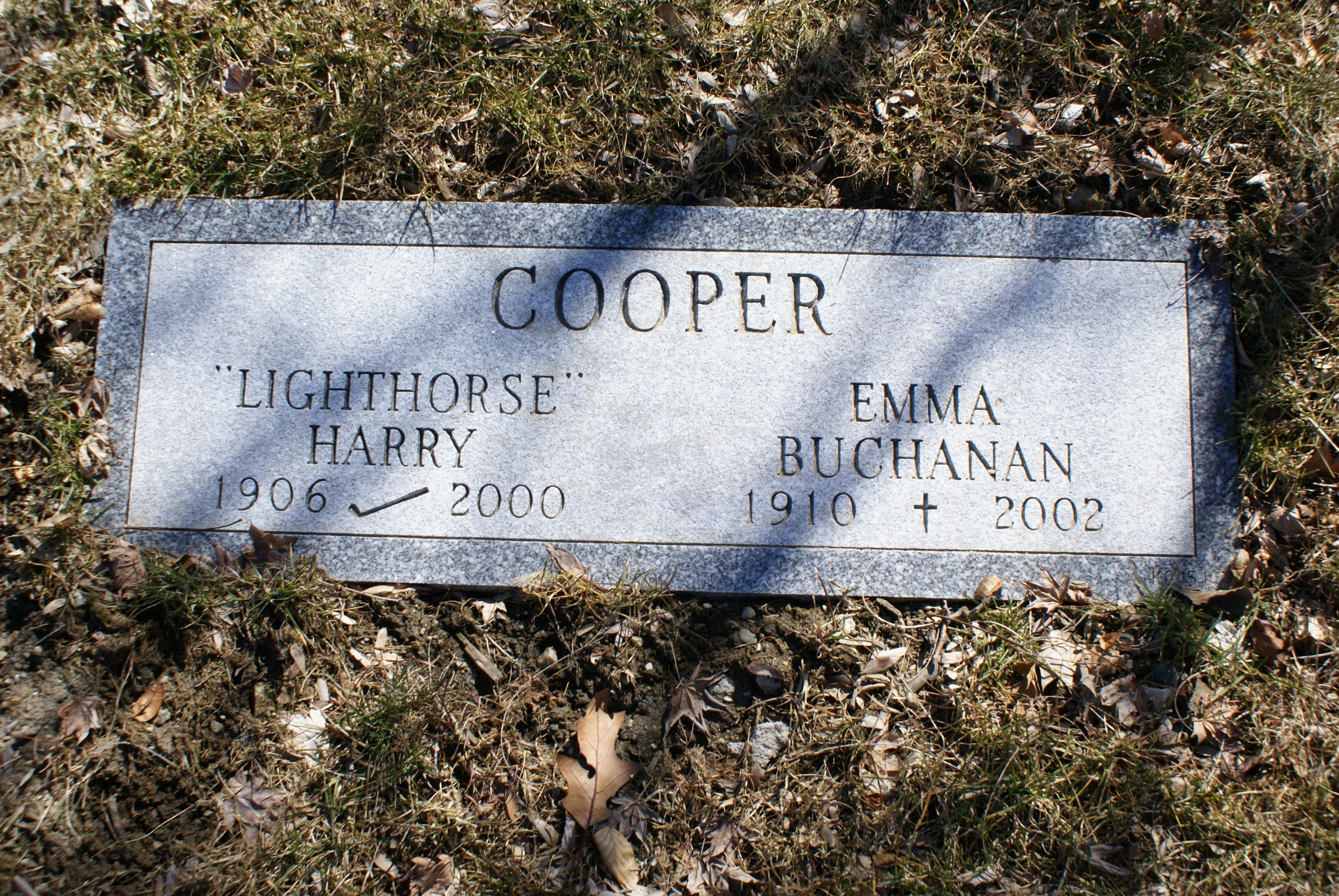
The grave of Harry Cooper in Kensico Cemetery

Cooper had no children and died in a hospital in White Plains, New York in 2000. He and his wife Emma (who died in 2002) are interred in Lot 15, Graves 1 and 2, in the Kensico Gardens Section of the Kensico Cemetery in Valhalla, New York. His grave is now marked with a headstone, but his grave marker erroneously shows 1906 instead of 1904 as his birth year.

He was inducted into the World Golf Hall of Fame in 1992.

== Professional wins (36) ==
=== PGA Tour wins (29) ===
- 1923 (1) Galveston Open Championship
- 1926 (2) Los Angeles Open, Monterey Peninsula Championship
- 1927 (1) Pebble Beach Open
- 1929 (2) Shawnee Open
- 1930 (3) St. Paul Open, Medinah C.C. Invitational, Salt Lake Open
- 1931 (2) Tri-State Open, Pasadena Open
- 1932 (1) Canadian Open
- 1933 (1) Arizona Open
- 1934 (2) Western Open, Illinois Open
- 1935 (3) Medinah Open, Illinois Open, St. Paul Open
- 1936 (2) Florida West Coast Open, St. Paul Open
- 1937 (7) Los Angeles Open, Houston Open, St. Petersburg Open, True Temper Open, Canadian Open, Inverness Invitational Four-Ball (with Horton Smith), Oklahoma Four-Ball (with Horton Smith)
- 1938 (2) Oakland Open, Crescent City Open
- 1939 (1) Goodall Palm Beach Round Robin

=== Other wins (7) ===
this list is probably incomplete

- 1927 Oklahoma City Open
- 1929 Old Westbury Invitational
- 1932 Illinois PGA Championship
- 1934 Illinois PGA Championship
- 1939 Connecticut Open
- 1942 Minnesota State Open
- 1955 Metropolitan PGA Championship

== Results in major championships ==
Tournament	1923	1924	1925	1926	1927	1928	1929
U.S. Open				CUT	2	CUT	T51
PGA Championship	R32		SF	R32	R16		

Tournament	1930	1931	1932	1933	1934	1935	1936	1937	1938	1939
Masters Tournament	NYF	NYF	NYF	NYF	WD	T25	2	4	T2	T33
U.S. Open	4	T15	T7	T29	T3	T28	2	4	T3	T12
PGA Championship	R16			R16	R16	R64	R16	QF	R64	R64

Tournament	1940	1941	1942
Masters Tournament	T4	T14	T18
U.S. Open	CUT		NT
PGA Championship	R64		QF

Note: Cooper did not play in The Open Championship.

Top 10
Did not play

NYF = tournament not yet founded
NT = no tournament
WD = withdrew
CUT = missed the half-way cut
R64, R32, R16, QF, SF = round in which player lost in PGA Championship match play
"T" indicates a tie for a place

== See also ==
- List of golfers with most PGA Tour wins
