= Vic Ghezzi =

American professional golfer (1910–1976)

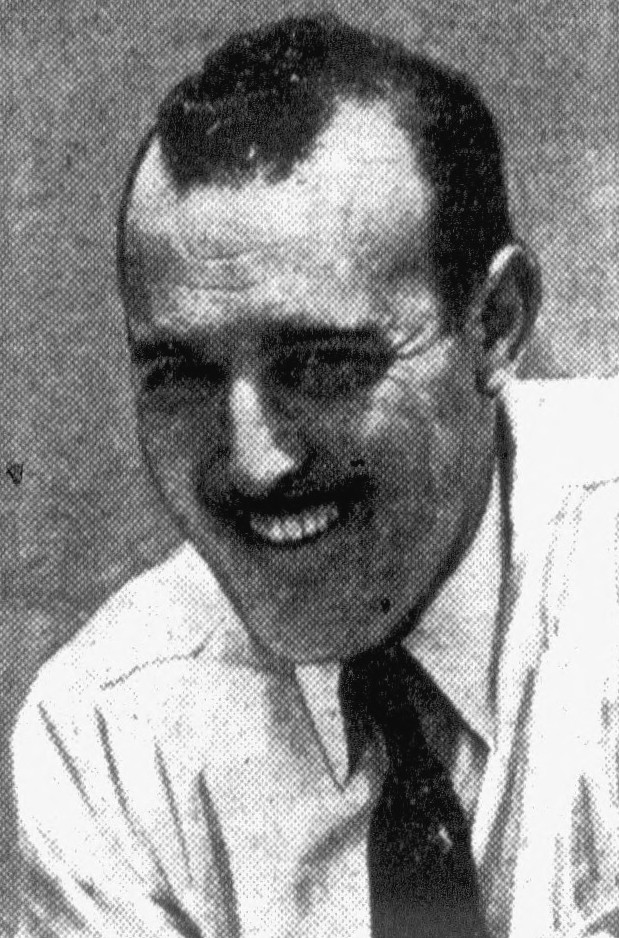
- Ghezzi, circa 1949

Personal information
- Full name: Victor J. Ghezzi
- Nationality: United States
- Born: October 19, 1910 Rumson, New Jersey, U.S.
- Died: May 30, 1976 (aged 65) Miami Beach, Florida, U.S.
- Height: 6 ft 4 in (1.93 m)
- Weight: 190 lb (86 kg; 14 st)

Career
- Sport: Golf
- Turned professional: 1932
- Former tour: PGA Tour
- Professional wins: 17

Number of wins by tour
- PGA Tour: 10
- Other: 7

Best results in major championships (wins: 1)
- Masters Tournament: T6: 1941
- PGA Championship: Won: 1941
- U.S. Open: T2: 1946
- The Open Championship: T18: 1947

Victor J. Ghezzi (October 19, 1910 – May 30, 1976) was an American professional golfer.

== Career ==
In 1910, Ghezzi was born in Rumson, New Jersey.

Ghezzi won ten times on the PGA Tour, including one major title, which was the 1941 PGA Championship, where he defeated Byron Nelson in 38 holes in the finals. He was selected for three Ryder Cup teams: in 1939, 1941, and 1943. However, each selection was canceled due to World War II. During the war, Ghezzi enlisted in the U.S. Army and began his training in early 1942.

At the 1946 U.S. Open, he was in an 18-hole Sunday morning playoff with Lloyd Mangrum and Nelson. It ended in a three-way tie, forcing another 18 holes. Mangrum won that afternoon round by a single stroke over both Ghezzi and Nelson.

== Personal life ==
In 1976, Ghezzi died of cancer at the age of 65 in the Miami Heart Institute in Miami Beach, Florida.

== Awards and honors ==
In 1965, Ghezzi was elected to the PGA of America's Hall of Fame.

== Professional wins (17) ==
=== PGA Tour wins (10) ===
- 1935 (2) Los Angeles Open, Calvert Open
- 1936 (2) Hollywood Open
- 1937 (1) Lake Placid Open
- 1938 (3) North and South Open, Inverness Invitational Four-Ball (with Sam Snead), Hershey Four-Ball (with Ben Hogan)
- 1941 (1) **PGA Championship**
- 1947 (1) Greater Greensboro Open
- 1948 (1) Dapper Dan-Alcoma Tournament

Major championship win is shown in bold.

=== Other wins (7) ===
this list may be incomplete

- 1935 Maryland Open
- 1936 New Jersey PGA Championship
- 1937 New Jersey State Open
- 1939 New Jersey PGA Championship
- 1943 New Jersey State Open
- 1944 New Jersey State Open
- 1949 New Jersey PGA Championship

== Major championships ==
=== Wins (1) ===
| Year | Championship | Winning score | Runner-up |
|---|---|---|---|
| 1941 | PGA Championship | 38 holes | (United States) Byron Nelson |

Note: The PGA Championship was match play until 1958

=== Results timeline ===
| Tournament | 1932 | 1933 | 1934 | 1935 | 1936 | 1937 | 1938 | 1939 |
|---|---|---|---|---|---|---|---|---|
| Masters Tournament | NYF | NYF | T25 | 8 | T15 | T8 | T10 | T12 |
| U.S. Open | T45 | | CUT | 20 | T18 | T20 | T11 | T29 |
| The Open Championship | | | | | | | | |
| PGA Championship | R32 | R32 | R16 | R32 | R16 | R16 | | R32 |

| Tournament | 1940 | 1941 | 1942 | 1943 | 1944 | 1945 | 1946 | 1947 | 1948 | 1949 |
|---|---|---|---|---|---|---|---|---|---|---|
| Masters Tournament | T39 | T6 | | NT | NT | NT | T12 | 21 | T18 | T35 |
| U.S. Open | 15 | 19 | NT | NT | NT | NT | T2 | T6 | T14 | T37 |
| The Open Championship | NT | NT | NT | NT | NT | NT | | T18 | | |
| PGA Championship | R32 | **1** | R32 | NT | | QF | R32 | SF | R64 | |

| Tournament | 1950 | 1951 | 1952 | 1953 | 1954 | 1955 | 1956 | 1957 | 1958 | 1959 |
|---|---|---|---|---|---|---|---|---|---|---|
| Masters Tournament | T14 | WD | T30 | WD | T29 | T53 | T29 | CUT | CUT | CUT |
| U.S. Open | | | | CUT | CUT | | | CUT | | T38 |
| The Open Championship | | | | | | | | | | |
| PGA Championship | R64 | R16 | R16 | R64 | | R32 | R128 | R64 | T56 | |

| Tournament | 1960 | 1961 | 1962 | 1963 | 1964 | 1965 | 1966 | 1967 | 1968 | 1969 |
|---|---|---|---|---|---|---|---|---|---|---|
| Masters Tournament | CUT | CUT | CUT | | | | | | | |
| U.S. Open | | | CUT | CUT | | | | | | |
| The Open Championship | | | | | | | | | | |
| PGA Championship | CUT | CUT | T57 | CUT | WD | T49 | WD | | | |

| Tournament | 1970 | 1971 | 1972 | 1973 |
|---|---|---|---|---|
| Masters Tournament | | | | |
| U.S. Open | | | | |
| The Open Championship | | | | |
| PGA Championship | WD | | | WD |

Win
Top 10
Did not play

NYF = tournament not yet founded
NT = no tournament
WD = withdrew
CUT = missed the half-way cut
R128, R64, R32, R16, QF, SF = round in which player lost in PGA Championship match play
"T" indicates a tie for a place

=== Summary ===
| Tournament | Wins | 2nd | 3rd | Top-5 | Top-10 | Top-25 | Events | Cuts made |
|---|---|---|---|---|---|---|---|---|
| Masters Tournament | 0 | 0 | 0 | 0 | 4 | 11 | 25 | 17 |
| U.S. Open | 0 | 1 | 0 | 1 | 2 | 9 | 19 | 13 |
| The Open Championship | 0 | 0 | 0 | 0 | 0 | 1 | 1 | 1 |
| PGA Championship | 1 | 0 | 1 | 3 | 8 | 16 | 31 | 24 |
| Totals | 1 | 1 | 1 | 4 | 14 | 37 | 76 | 55 |

- Most consecutive cuts made – 36 (1934 PGA – 1950 PGA)
- Longest streak of top-10s – 3 (1936 PGA – 1937 PGA)

== See also ==
- List of men's major championships winning golfers
