= Denny Shute =

American professional golfer (1904–1974)

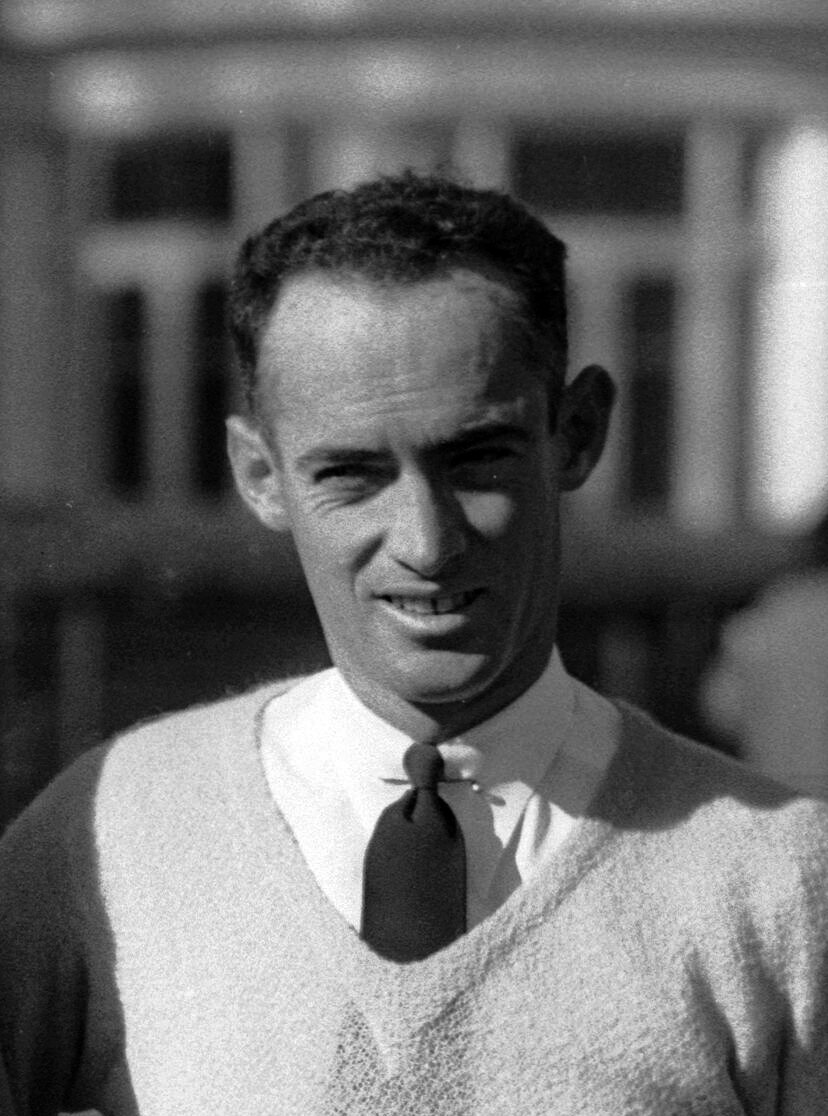
- Shute in 1934

Personal information
- Full name: Herman Densmore Shute
- Nickname: Denny
- Born: October 25, 1904 Cleveland, Ohio, U.S.
- Died: May 13, 1974 (aged 69) Akron, Ohio, U.S.
- Spouse: Hettie M. Potts Shute
- Children: Nancy Paige (Shute)

Career
- Sport: Golf
- College: Western Reserve
- Turned professional: 1928
- Former tour: PGA Tour
- Professional wins: 17

Number of wins by tour
- PGA Tour: 16
- Other: 1

Best results in major championships (wins: 3)
- Masters Tournament: 5th: 1935
- PGA Championship: Won: 1936, 1937
- U.S. Open: 2nd: 1941
- The Open Championship: Won: 1933

Achievements and awards
- World Golf Hall of Fame: 2008 (member page)

Herman Densmore "Denny" Shute (October 25, 1904 – May 13, 1974) was an American professional golfer who won three major championships in the 1930s.

== Life and career ==
Born in Cleveland, Ohio, Shute was the son of a golf pro from England; Hermon emigrated to the United States to work as the assistant professional at the Euclid Club. Shute was raised in West Virginia and Ohio and attended Western Reserve University (now Case Western Reserve University) in Cleveland, and was a member of Phi Gamma Delta. He was married on March 20, 1930 to Hettie Marie Potts, and they had one child, a daughter, Nancy Paige.

Shute won the Open Championship at St Andrews in 1933 in a playoff and the 1936 and 1937 PGA Championships, then conducted at match play. He was the last man to win consecutive PGA Championships before Tiger Woods did so in 1999 and 2000.

Shute was a member of the U.S. team in the Ryder Cup on three occasions: 1931, 1933, and 1937. In 1933, he missed a putt to tie the competition.

Shute died at age 69 at his home in Akron, Ohio. He was elected to the World Golf Hall of Fame in the veterans category in 2008.

== Professional wins ==
=== PGA Tour wins (16) ===
- 1929 (1) Ohio Open
- 1930 (3) Los Angeles Open, Texas Open, Ohio Open
- 1931 (1) Ohio Open
- 1932 (2) Glens Falls Open, Miami Biltmore Open
- 1933 (2) Gasparilla Open, **British Open**
- 1934 (3) Gasparilla Open-Tampa, Riverdale Open, Miami International Four-Ball (with Al Espinosa)
- 1936 (2) Tropical Open, **PGA Championship**
- 1937 (1) **PGA Championship**
- 1939 (1) Glens Falls Open

Major championships are shown in bold.

=== Other wins ===
this list may be incomplete

- 1950 Ohio Open

== Major championships ==
=== Wins (3) ===
Year	Championship	54 holes	Winning score	Margin	Runner-up
1933	The Open Championship	3 shot deficit	E (73-73-73-73=292)	Playoff ^{1}	(United States) Craig Wood
1936	PGA Championship	n/a	3 & 2		(Scotland) / (United States) Jimmy Thomson
1937	PGA Championship (2)	n/a	37 holes		(United States) Harold "Jug" McSpaden

Note: The PGA Championship was match play until 1958
^{1} Defeated Craig Wood in a 36-hole playoff: Shute 75-74=149; Wood 78-76=154.

=== Results timeline ===
Tournament	1926	1927	1928	1929
U.S. Open	T43	T48	T6	T3
The Open Championship				
PGA Championship				R32

Tournament	1930	1931	1932	1933	1934	1935	1936	1937	1938	1939
Masters Tournament	NYF	NYF	NYF	NYF	T13	5	T11	T13	WD	15
U.S. Open	T25	T25	T14	T21	T43	T4	10	T10	T11	3
The Open Championship				**1**	20			14		
PGA Championship	R16	2	R32		SF	R16	**1**	**1**	R16	R16

Tournament	1940	1941	1942	1943	1944	1945	1946	1947	1948	1949
Masters Tournament		18	WD	NT	NT	NT	T25	20	32	T45
U.S. Open		2	NT	NT	NT	NT	CUT	CUT		CUT
The Open Championship	NT	NT	NT	NT	NT	NT				
PGA Championship	WD	QF	R32	NT		QF		DNQ	DNQ	R64

Tournament	1950	1951	1952	1953	1954	1955	1956	1957	1958	1959
Masters Tournament	T35	T47	T49	T55	T68	T36	71	CUT	CUT	CUT
U.S. Open	T31	CUT		CUT	CUT			CUT		
The Open Championship										
PGA Championship	R16	R32	R64					R64	CUT	T44

Tournament	1960	1961	1962	1963	1964	1965	1966	1967	1968	1969
Masters Tournament	CUT	CUT	CUT							
U.S. Open										
The Open Championship										
PGA Championship	CUT	CUT			CUT	CUT	CUT			CUT

Tournament	1970	1971	1972
Masters Tournament			
U.S. Open			
The Open Championship	CUT		
PGA Championship	CUT	CUT	CUT

Win
Top 10
Did not play

NYF = tournament not yet founded
NT = no tournament
WD = withdrew
DNQ = did not qualify for match play portion
CUT = missed the half-way cut (3rd round cut in 1958 PGA Championship)
R64, R32, R16, QF, SF = Round in which player lost in PGA Championship match play
"T" indicates a tie for a place

=== Summary ===
Tournament	Wins	2nd	3rd	Top-5	Top-10	Top-25	Events	Cuts made
Masters Tournament	0	0	0	1	1	8	25	17
U.S. Open	0	1	2	4	7	12	23	16
The Open Championship	1	0	0	1	1	3	4	3
PGA Championship	2	1	1	6	11	15	29	19
Totals	3	2	3	12	20	38	81	55

- Most consecutive cuts made – 26 (1926 U.S. Open – 1937 PGA)
- Longest streak of top-10s – 4 (1934 PGA – 1935 PGA)
