= Paul Runyan =

American professional golfer (1908–2002)

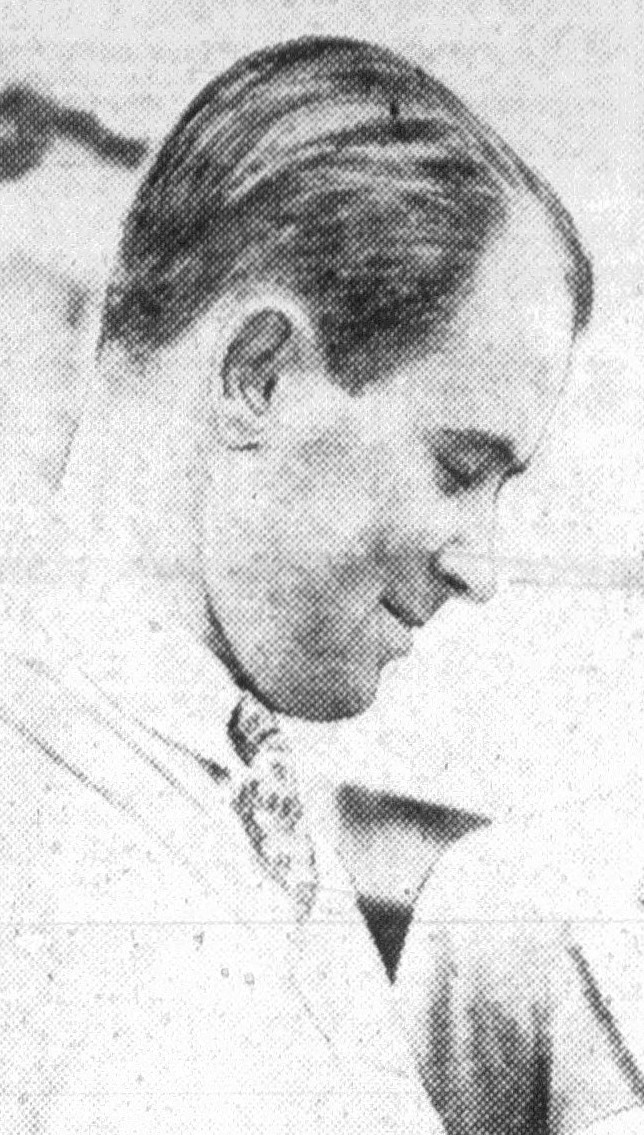
- Runyan, circa 1933

Personal information
- Full name: Paul Scott Runyan
- Nickname: Little Poison
- Nationality: United States
- Born: July 12, 1908 Hot Springs, Arkansas, U.S.
- Died: March 17, 2002 (aged 93) Palm Springs, California, U.S.
- Height: 5 ft 7 in (1.70 m)
- Weight: 130 lb (59 kg; 9.3 st)

Career
- Sport: Golf
- Turned professional: 1925
- Former tour: PGA Tour
- Professional wins: 37

Number of wins by tour
- PGA Tour: 29
- Other: 8

Best results in major championships (wins: 2)
- Masters Tournament: 3rd/T3: 1934, 1942
- PGA Championship: Won: 1934, 1938
- U.S. Open: T5: 1941
- The Open Championship: T18: 1961

Achievements and awards
- World Golf Hall of Fame: 1990 (member page)
- PGA Tour leading money winner: 1934

Paul Scott Runyan (July 12, 1908 – March 17, 2002) was an American professional golfer. Among the world's best players in the mid-1930s, he won two PGA Championships and is a member of the World Golf Hall of Fame. Runyan was also a golf instructor.

== Early life ==
Runyan was born in Hot Springs, Arkansas. He started out as a caddie and then an apprentice at a golf course in his hometown.

== Professional career ==
Runyan turned pro at the age of 17. He was head professional at a Little Rock club by age 18. Runyan served as head pro at Metropolis Country Club in White Plains, New York from 1931 to 1943 during which time he won both of his PGA Championships.

In 1934, Runyan defeated Craig Wood in extra holes in the title match of the PGA Championship, the first of his two PGA Championships. Of Runyan's 29 career PGA Tour wins, 16 of them came in 1933 and 1934, and his nine wins in 1933 make him one of only seven golfers to win nine or more times in one year on the PGA Tour. In the first Masters Tournament in 1934, he was paired for the first 36 holes with tournament host Bobby Jones. Runyan won the tour money title in 1934, and was a member of the U.S. Ryder Cup team in 1933 and 1935.

Runyan was competitive for many years; he won the PGA Championship again in 1938 and led the U.S. Open after three rounds as late as 1951. In the finals of his 1938 PGA, Runyan defeated Sam Snead 8 and 7, the most lopsided title match ever in the event, conducted as match play through 1957. This was despite Snead's vastly greater length off the tee, as much as 75 yards (70 m) per hole.

Fellow golfers nicknamed him "Little Poison" (a take on 1930s baseball player Lloyd Waner, who had the same nickname), primarily because he did not drive the ball very far, but also because he had a terrific short game. Runyan had worked tirelessly on his short game from boyhood, since he realized early on if he were to succeed in golf, he had to compensate for his lack of length. Runyan opined that he is the smallest player in golf history who had significant success, although Fred McLeod had a fine record, too, and stood only 5 ft 4 in (1.63 m) and weighed a paltry 108 lb (49 kg; 7.7 st).

=== Instructor ===
Runyan's teaching prowess led many top pros to him over his 75 years of teaching, including Gene Littler, Phil Rodgers, Chuck Courtney, Frank Beard, Jim Ferree and Mickey Wright. Golf Magazine wrote: "... since the late 1930s, he has probably been the most influential short game instructor. Untold thousands have been taught his methods for putting and chipping." Runyan wrote an influential book outlining his short-game methods, The Short Way to Lower Scoring.

He appeared as a contestant on the October 25, 1950, edition of You Bet Your Life where he tells an anecdote of hitting a spectator with his ball and in another competition his partner hits the same man.

Runyan was the first head golf professional at Sahalee Country Club in Sammamish, Washington and served from 1968 to 1971. He also attended the 1998 PGA Championship held at Sahalee.

In 2000, he completed the annual Par 3 competition held one day before the Masters at the age of 91.

== Personal life ==
In 2002, Runyan died in Palm Springs, California.

== Awards and honors ==
- In 1990, Runyan was inducted into the World Golf Hall of Fame.
- Runyan received the Harvey Penick Lifetime Teaching Award
- In 1998, he received the PGA of America Distinguished Service Award.
- In addition, he is a member of the World Golf Teachers Hall of Fame, the Arkansas Hall of Fame and The Southern California Golf Association Hall of Fame.

== Professional wins ==
=== PGA Tour wins (29) ===
- 1930 (2) North and South Open, New Jersey Open
- 1931 (2) Metropolitan PGA, Westchester Open
- 1932 (1) Gasparilla Open Match Play
- 1933 (9) Agua Caliente Open, Miami Biltmore Open (March), Virginia Beach Cavalier Open, Eastern Open Championship, National Capital Open, Mid-South Pro-Pro (with Willie Macfarlane), Mid-South Open (tie with Willie Macfarlane and Joe Turnesa), Miami International Four-Ball (with Horton Smith), Pasadena Open
- 1934 (6) St. Petersburg Open, Florida West Coast Open, Tournament of the Gardens Open, The Cavalier Open, Metropolitan Open, **PGA Championship**
- 1935 (4) North and South Open, Grand Slam Open, Westchester Open, Metropolitan PGA
- 1936 (2) Westchester Open, Metropolitan PGA
- 1938 (1) **PGA Championship**
- 1939 (1) Westchester Open
- 1941 (1) Goodall Round Robin

Major championships are shown in bold.

=== Other wins ===
this list is probably incomplete

- 1934 Westchester Open
- 1938 Argentine Open
- 1942 Westchester Open
- 1947 Southern California PGA Championship

=== Senior wins ===
- 1961 PGA Seniors' Championship, World Senior Championship
- 1962 PGA Seniors' Championship, World Senior Championship

== Major championships ==
=== Wins (2) ===
Year	Championship	Winning score	Runner-up
1934	PGA Championship	38 holes	(United States) Craig Wood
1938	PGA Championship	8 & 7	(United States) Sam Snead

Note: The PGA Championship was match play through 1957

=== Results timeline ===
Tournament	1928	1929
U.S. Open	63	
The Open Championship		
PGA Championship		

Tournament	1930	1931	1932	1933	1934	1935	1936	1937	1938	1939
Masters Tournament	NYF	NYF	NYF	NYF	T3	7	T4	T19	4	T16
U.S. Open			T12	DQ	T28	T10	T8	T14	T7	T9
The Open Championship				CUT						
PGA Championship		R16	R32	QF	1	QF	R64	R16	1	QF

Tournament	1940	1941	1942	1943	1944	1945	1946	1947	1948	1949
Masters Tournament	T12	T35	3	NT	NT	NT				
U.S. Open	49	T5	NT	NT	NT	NT	21	T6	T53	
The Open Championship	NT	NT	NT	NT	NT	NT				
PGA Championship	QF	R64	DNQ	NT				DNQ		

Tournament	1950	1951	1952	1953	1954	1955	1956	1957	1958	1959
Masters Tournament								CUT	T35	
U.S. Open	T25	T6	T22	CUT	CUT		CUT			
The Open Championship										
PGA Championship	R64	DNQ								

Tournament	1960	1961	1962	1963	1964	1965	1966	1967	1968	1969
Masters Tournament	CUT									
U.S. Open	CUT									
The Open Championship		T18	CUT							
PGA Championship						WD			CUT	

Tournament	1970	1971	1972	1973	1974
Masters Tournament					
U.S. Open					
The Open Championship					
PGA Championship				CUT	WD

Win
Top 10
Did not play

NYF = tournament not yet founded
NT = no tournament
WD = withdrew
DQ = disqualified
DNQ = did not qualify for match play portion
CUT = missed the half-way cut
R64, R32, R16, QF, SF = Round in which player lost in PGA Championship match play
"T" indicates a tie for a place

=== Summary ===
Tournament	Wins	2nd	3rd	Top-5	Top-10	Top-25	Events	Cuts made
Masters Tournament	0	0	2	4	5	8	12	10
U.S. Open	0	0	0	1	7	12	21	16
The Open Championship	0	0	0	0	0	1	3	1
PGA Championship	2	0	0	6	8	9	16	12
Totals	2	0	2	11	20	30	52	39

- Most consecutive cuts made – 33 (1933 PGA – 1952 U.S. Open)
- Longest streak of top-10s – 6 (1934 PGA – 1936 U.S. Open)

== See also ==
- List of golfers with most PGA Tour wins
- Most PGA Tour wins in a year
