= 1942 Masters Tournament =

Tournament information
- Dates: April 9–13, 1942
- Location: Augusta, Georgia; 33.503°N 82.020°W
- Course: Augusta National Golf Club
- Organized by: Augusta National Golf Club
- Tour: PGA Tour

Statistics
- Par: 72
- Field: 42 players
- Cut: None
- Prize fund: $5,000
- Winner's share: $1,500

Champion
- (United States) Byron Nelson
- 280 (−8), playoff

Location map
- Location in the United States Location in Georgia

The 1942 Masters Tournament was the ninth Masters Tournament, held April 9–13 at Augusta National Golf Club in Augusta, Georgia.

Byron Nelson, the 1937 champion, won an 18-hole playoff by one stroke over runner-up Ben Hogan. Down by three strokes after four holes, Nelson played the final fourteen holes at five-under-par to claim the winner's share of $1,500 from a $5,000 purse. The playoff was refereed by tournament host Bobby Jones. Nelson was the second to win a second Masters, joining Horton Smith.

On Sunday, Nelson started the final round with a three stroke lead, with a gallery of 6,000 on the grounds. Hogan birdied 18 to shoot 70 (−2) and 280 (−8) and waited for Nelson to finish the last three holes. Nelson found a greenside bunker at 17 and bogeyed to fall into a tie. He had a 12-foot (3.7 m) birdie putt to win on the 72nd hole, but left it short and tapped in to force the Monday playoff.

It was the second playoff at the Masters; the first in 1935 was 36 holes.

This was the last Masters until 1946; it was not played from 1943 to 1945 due to World War II.

== Field ==
1. Masters champions

Jimmy Demaret (9), Ralph Guldahl (2,9,10), Byron Nelson (2,6,9,10,12), Henry Picard (6,10), Gene Sarazen (2,4,6,9,10,12), Horton Smith (9,10), Craig Wood (2,9,10)

2. U.S. Open champions

Tommy Armour (4,6), Billy Burke, Bobby Jones (3,4,5), Lawson Little (3,5,9,10)

3. U.S. Amateur champions

Bud Ward (10,11,a)

4. British Open champions

Denny Shute (6,9,10,12)

5. British Amateur champions

Charlie Yates (a)

6. PGA champions

Paul Runyan (10)

7. Members of the U.S. Ryder Cup team

- Not held

8. Members of the U.S. Walker Cup team

- Not held

9. Top 30 players and ties from the 1941 Masters Tournament

Sammy Byrd (10), Harry Cooper, Ed Dudley (10), Jim Ferrier (10), Jim Foulis, Willie Goggin, Jimmy Hines (10,12), Ben Hogan (10,12), Gene Kunes (10), Lloyd Mangrum (10,12), Jug McSpaden (10), Toney Penna, Jack Ryan, Felix Serafin, Sam Snead (10,12), Jimmy Thomson

- Dick Chapman (3,a), Vic Ghezzi (6,10,12), Clayton Heafner (10), Ray Mangrum, Dick Metz (10) and Sam Parks Jr. (2) did not play

10. Top 30 players and ties from the 1941 U.S. Open

Herman Barron, Jerry Gianferante, Dutch Harrison, Herman Keiser, Johnny Morris, Johnny Palmer, Joe Zarhardt

- Johnny Bulla, Henry Ransom and Harry Todd did not play.

11. 1941 U.S. Amateur quarter-finalists

Steve Kovach (a)

- Pat Abbott (a), Ray Billows (a), Ted Bishop (a), Lou Jennings (a), Bruce McCormick (a), Bobby Riegel (a) did not play.

12. 1941 PGA Championship quarter-finalists

13. One amateur, not already qualified, selected by a ballot of ex-U.S. Amateur champions

- Wilford Wehrle (a) did not play.

14. One professional, not already qualified, selected by a ballot of ex-U.S. Open champions

Bobby Cruickshank

15. Two players, not already qualified, based on performances in the winter part of the 1941 PGA Tour

Chick Harbert, Chandler Harper

== Round summaries ==
=== First round ===
Thursday, April 9, 1942

| Place | Player | Score | To par |
|---|---|---|---|
| T1 | (United States) Paul Runyan | 67 | −5 |
| T1 | (United States) Horton Smith | 67 | −5 |
| T3 | (United States) Sammy Byrd | 68 | −4 |
| T3 | (United States) Byron Nelson | 68 | −4 |
| 5 | (United States) Jimmy Demaret | 70 | −2 |
| T6 | (United States) Billy Burke | 71 | −1 |
| T6 | (United States) Ed Dudley | 71 | −1 |
| T6 | (Australia) Jim Ferrier | 71 | −1 |
| T6 | (United States) Lawson Little | 71 | −1 |
| T10 | (Scotland) Bobby Cruickshank | 72 | E |
| T10 | (United States) Bobby Jones | 72 | E |
| T10 | (United States) Denny Shute | 72 | E |
| T10 | (United States) Craig Wood | 72 | E |

=== Second round ===
Friday, April 10, 1942

| Place | Player | Score | To par |
|---|---|---|---|
| 1 | (United States) Byron Nelson | 68-67=135 | −9 |
| 2 | (United States) Sammy Byrd | 68-68=136 | −8 |
| T3 | (United States) Jimmy Demaret | 70-70=140 | −4 |
| T3 | (United States) Paul Runyan | 67-73=140 | −4 |
| T3 | (United States) Horton Smith | 67-73=140 | −4 |
| T6 | (United States) Ben Hogan | 73-70=143 | −1 |
| T6 | (United States) Jimmy Thomson | 73-70=143 | −1 |
| T8 | (United States) Dutch Harrison | 74-70=144 | E |
| T8 | (United States) Willie Goggin | 74-70=144 | E |
| T10 | (United States) Lawson Little | 71-74=145 | +1 |
| T10 | (United States) Denny Shute | 72-73=145 | +1 |

=== Third round ===
Saturday, April 11, 1942

| Place | Player | Score | To par |
|---|---|---|---|
| 1 | (United States) Byron Nelson | 68-67-72=207 | −9 |
| 2 | (United States) Ben Hogan | 73-70-67=210 | −6 |
| 3 | (United States) Sammy Byrd | 68-68-75=211 | −5 |
| 4 | (United States) Paul Runyan | 67-73-72=212 | −4 |
| 5 | (United States) Horton Smith | 67-73-74=214 | −2 |
| T6 | (United States) Jimmy Demaret | 70-70-75=215 | −1 |
| T6 | (United States) Dutch Harrison | 74-70-71=215 | −1 |
| T8 | (United States) Lawson Little | 71-74-72=217 | +1 |
| T8 | (United States) Jimmy Thomson | 73-70-74=217 | +1 |
| 10 | (United States) Chick Harbert | 73-73-72=218 | +2 |

=== Final round ===
Sunday, April 12, 1942

==== Final leaderboard ====
Champion
Silver Cup winner (low amateur)
(a) = amateur
(c) = past champion

Top 10
| Place | Player | Score | To par | Money (US$) |
|---|---|---|---|---|
| T1 | (United States) Ben Hogan | 73-70-67-70=280 | −8 | Playoff |
| T1 | (United States) Byron Nelson (c) | 68-67-72-73=280 | −8 | Playoff |
| 3 | (United States) Paul Runyan | 67-73-72-71=283 | −5 | 600 |
| 4 | (United States) Sammy Byrd | 68-68-75-74=285 | −3 | 500 |
| 5 | (United States) Horton Smith (c) | 67-73-74-73=287 | −1 | 400 |
| 6 | (United States) Jimmy Demaret (c) | 70-70-75-75=290 | +2 | 300 |
| T7 | (United States) Dutch Harrison | 74-70-71-77=292 | +4 | 200 |
| T7 | (United States) Lawson Little | 71-74-72-75=292 | +4 | 200 |
| T7 | (United States) Sam Snead | 78-69-72-73=292 | +4 | 200 |
| T10 | (United States) Chick Harbert | 73-73-72-75=293 | +5 | 100 |
| T10 | (United States) Gene Kunes | 74-74-74-71=293 | +5 | 100 |

Leaderboard below the top 10
| Place | Player | Score | To par | Money ($) |
|---|---|---|---|---|
| 12 | (United States) Jimmy Thomson | 73-70-74-77=294 | +6 | 100 |
| 13 | (United States) Chandler Harper | 75-75-76-69=295 | +7 | |
| 14 | (United States) Willie Goggin | 74-70-78-74=296 | +8 | |
| T15 | (United States) Bobby Cruickshank | 72-79-71-75=297 | +9 | |
| T15 | (United States) Jim Ferrier | 71-76-80-70=297 | +9 | |
| T15 | (United States) Henry Picard (c) | 75-72-75-75=297 | +9 | |
| T18 | (United States) Harry Cooper | 74-77-76-72=299 | +11 | |
| T18 | (United States) Jug McSpaden | 74-72-79-74=299 | +11 | |
| T18 | (United States) Felix Serafin | 75-74-77-73=299 | +11 | |
| 21 | (United States) Ralph Guldahl (c) | 74-74-76-76=300 | +12 | |
| 22 | (United States) Toney Penna | 74-79-73-75=301 | +13 | |
| T23 | (United States) Billy Burke | 71-79-80-72=302 | +14 | |
| T23 | (United States) Herman Keiser | 74-74-78-76=302 | +14 | |
| T23 | (United States) Craig Wood (c) | 72-75-82-73=302 | +14 | |
| T26 | (United States) Jim Foulis | 75-71-79-78=303 | +15 | |
| T26 | (United States) Johnny Palmer | 78-75-75-75=303 | +15 | |
| T28 | (United States) Tommy Armour | 74-79-76-75=304 | +16 | |
| T28 | (United States) Bobby Jones | 72-75-79-78=304 | +16 | |
| T28 | (United States) Gene Sarazen (c) | 80-74-75-75=304 | +16 | |
| T28 | (United States) Bud Ward (a) | 76-73-80-75=304 | +16 | |
| T28 | (United States) Charlie Yates (a) | 78-76-74-76=304 | +16 | |
| T33 | (United States) Ed Dudley | 71-77-81-76=305 | +17 | |
| T33 | (United States) Jimmy Hines | 77-76-79-73=305 | +17 | |
| 35 | (United States) Steve Kovach (a) | 76-79-78-73=306 | +18 | |
| T36 | (United States) Herman Barron | 77-75-80-75=307 | +19 | |
| T36 | (United States) Jack Ryan | 77-71-76-83=307 | +19 | |
| 38 | (United States) Joe Zarhardt | 76-76-83-76=311 | +23 | |
| 39 | (United States) Jerry Gianferante | 77-80-82-73=312 | +24 | |
| 40 | (United States) Johnny Morris | 83-75-80-75=313 | +25 | |
| WD | (United States) Denny Shute | 72-73-81=226 | +10 | |
| WD | (United States) Lloyd Mangrum | 74 | +2 | |

==== Scorecard ====
| Hole | 1 | 2 | 3 | 4 | 5 | 6 | 7 | 8 | 9 | 10 | 11 | 12 | 13 | 14 | 15 | 16 | 17 | 18 |
|---|---|---|---|---|---|---|---|---|---|---|---|---|---|---|---|---|---|---|
| Par | 4 | 5 | 4 | 3 | 4 | 3 | 4 | 5 | 4 | 4 | 4 | 3 | 5 | 4 | 5 | 3 | 4 | 4 |
| (United States) Nelson | −9 | −9 | −10 | −9 | −9 | −8 | −7 | −6 | −7 | −7 | −8 | −8 | −8 | −8 | −9 | −9 | −8 | −8 |
| (United States) Hogan | −6 | −6 | −6 | −6 | −6 | −6 | −5 | −6 | −6 | −6 | −6 | −6 | −7 | −7 | −7 | −7 | −7 | −8 |

Cumulative tournament scores, relative to par

=== Playoff ===
Monday, April 13, 1942

| Place | Player | Score | To par | Money ($) |
|---|---|---|---|---|
| 1 | (United States) Byron Nelson | 69 | −3 | 1,500 |
| 2 | (United States) Ben Hogan | 70 | −2 | 800 |

==== Scorecard ====
| Hole | 1 | 2 | 3 | 4 | 5 | 6 | 7 | 8 | 9 | 10 | 11 | 12 | 13 | 14 | 15 | 16 | 17 | 18 |
|---|---|---|---|---|---|---|---|---|---|---|---|---|---|---|---|---|---|---|
| Par | 4 | 5 | 4 | 3 | 4 | 3 | 4 | 5 | 4 | 4 | 4 | 3 | 5 | 4 | 5 | 3 | 4 | 4 |
| (United States) Nelson | +2 | +1 | +1 | +2 | +2 | +1 | +1 | −1 | −1 | −1 | −2 | −3 | −4 | −4 | −4 | −4 | −4 | −3 |
| (United States) Hogan | E | −1 | −1 | −1 | −1 | E | E | E | E | +1 | E | E | −1 | −2 | −3 | −2 | −2 | −2 |

| Eagle | Birdie | Bogey | Double bogey |
