= Byron Nelson =

American professional golfer (1912–2006)

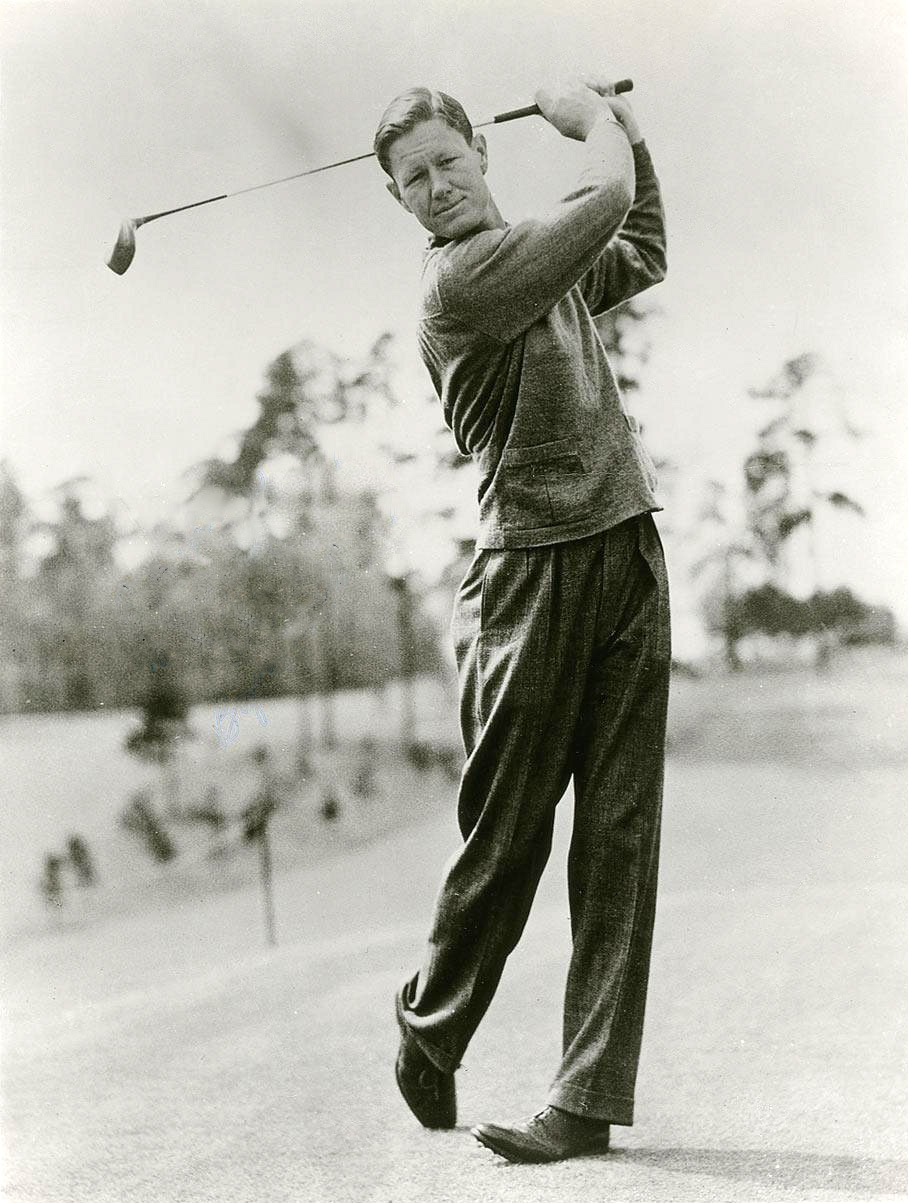
- Byron Nelson, c. 1944

Personal information
- Full name: John Byron Nelson Jr.
- Nickname: Lord Byron
- Nationality: United States
- Born: February 4, 1912 Waxahachie, Texas, U.S.
- Died: September 26, 2006 (aged 94) Roanoke, Texas, U.S.
- Height: 6 ft 1 in (185 cm)
- Spouses: Louise Shofner Nelson (m. 1934; died 1985); Peggy Simmons Nelson (m. 1986)

Career
- Sport: Golf
- Turned professional: 1932
- Former tour: PGA Tour
- Professional wins: 64

Number of wins by tour
- PGA Tour: 52 (6th all-time)
- Other: 12

Best results in major championships (wins: 5)
- Masters Tournament: Won: 1937, 1942
- PGA Championship: Won: 1940, 1945
- U.S. Open: Won: 1939
- The Open Championship: 5th: 1937

Achievements and awards
- World Golf Hall of Fame: 1974 (member page)
- Vardon Trophy: 1939
- PGA Tour leading money winner: 1944, 1945
- Associated Press Male Athlete of the Year: 1944, 1945
- Bob Jones Award: 1974
- PGA Tour Lifetime Achievement Award: 1997
- Payne Stewart Award: 2000
- Congressional Gold Medal: 2006
- (For a full list of awards, see here)

John Byron Nelson Jr. (February 4, 1912 – September 26, 2006) was an American professional golfer between 1935 and 1946, widely considered one of the greatest golfers of all time.

Nelson and two other legendary champions of the time, Ben Hogan and Sam Snead, were born within seven months of each other in 1912. Although he won many tournaments in the course of his relatively brief career, he is mostly remembered today for having won 11 consecutive tournaments and 18 total tournaments in 1945. He retired officially at the age of 34 to be a rancher, later becoming a commentator for ABC Sports and lending his name to the Byron Nelson Classic, the first PGA Tour event to be named for a professional golfer. As a former Masters champion he continued to play in that annual tournament, placing in the top-10 six times between 1947 and 1955 and as high as 15th in 1965.

In 1974, Nelson received the Bob Jones Award, the highest honor given by the United States Golf Association in recognition of distinguished sportsmanship in golf, and was inducted into the World Golf Hall of Fame. He became the second recipient of the PGA Tour Lifetime Achievement Award in 1997. He received the 1994 Old Tom Morris Award from the Golf Course Superintendents Association of America, that organization's highest honor. Nelson was posthumously awarded the Congressional Gold Medal in 2006.

== Early life ==
Born near Waxahachie, Texas, Byron Nelson was the son of Madge Allen Nelson (1893–1992) and John Byron Nelson Sr. (1889–1965). His parents set a precedent for him not only in their long lives — Madge Nelson lived to age 98, and her husband to age 77 — but also in their religious commitment. Madge, who had grown up Baptist, was baptized in the Church of Christ at age 18, and John Byron Sr., raised Presbyterian, was baptized in the Church of Christ soon after meeting Madge. The senior Byron Nelson went on to serve as an elder in the Roanoke Church of Christ, and the younger Byron Nelson was a committed member of that congregation, even performing janitorial services there from time to time long after he became famous. He placed his membership at the Hilltop Church of Christ in Roanoke from 1989 until 2000, when he moved his membership to the Richland Hills Church of Christ in North Richland Hills, Texas.

When Nelson was 11 years old, the family moved to Fort Worth, where he barely survived typhoid fever after losing nearly half his body weight to the disease, which also left him unable to sire children. Soon after his baptism at age 12, he started caddying at Glen Garden Country Club. On his caddying days, Nelson said, "I knew nothing about caddying at first, but it wasn't difficult to learn. The other caddies, though, didn't like to see any new ones, because that might mean they wouldn't get a job sometime." An article on Nelson in Sports Illustrated noted that initially caddies were not permitted to play at the club: "[H]e would often practice in the dark, putting his white handkerchief over the hole so he could find it in the darkness." The club later changed its policy and sponsored a caddie tournament, where a 14-year-old Nelson beat fellow caddie and future golf great Ben Hogan by a single stroke after a nine-hole playoff. Nelson and Hogan were rivals but close friends in their teen years, and for the first part of their professional careers as well, but Nelson's early success was difficult for the struggling Hogan to deal with, and they gradually grew apart, while retaining mutual respect.

In 1934, Nelson was working as a golf pro in Texarkana, Arkansas, when he met his future wife Louise Shofner, to whom he was married for 50 years before she died in 1985 after two severe strokes.

== Professional career ==
=== Championship heyday ===
After turning professional in 1932, Nelson served as a club professional in Texas and played as many significant tournaments as he could afford, to develop his game. Money was tight, as Texas was hit very hard by the Great Depression. A pair of top-three finishes in important Texas events encouraged him. He then took a club professional's job at the Ridgewood Country Club in New Jersey in 1935. He worked hard on his game, having earlier realized that with the technological change from hickory to steel shafts, which was gathering momentum in the early 1930s, that the golf swing would have to adapt as well. Nelson was among the first of a new generation of players who developed a full swing with increased leg drive leading the downswing; this is the forerunner of modern golf technique as practiced by top players, right to the present day. Nelson is sometimes credited as being the father of the modern golf swing. He refined the changes for a couple of years, and then took his game to the highest level of competition, the PGA Tour. Nelson's first significant victory was in 1935 at the New Jersey State Open. He followed this up with a win at the Metropolitan Open the following year. He reportedly won this tournament with "$5 in my pocket".

In 1937, Nelson was hired as the head professional at the Reading Country Club in Reading, Pennsylvania, and worked there until 1940, when he took a new job as head pro at the Inverness Club in Toledo, Ohio. While at Inverness, Nelson coached and mentored the promising young player Frank Stranahan, who would go on to stardom over the next two decades.

=== Wins major championships ===
Nelson won his first major title at The Masters in 1937, two shots ahead of runner-up Ralph Guldahl. During this tournament, he shot a first-round 66, which was the lowest first-round score at the Masters until 1976, when Raymond Floyd shot a 65 en route to his victory. Nelson won four more majors, the U.S. Open in 1939, the PGA Championship in 1940 and 1945, and a second Masters in 1942.

==== World War II years ====
Nelson had a blood disorder that caused his blood to clot four times slower than normal, which kept him out of military service during World War II. It has sometimes mistakenly been reported that he had hemophilia. During the war, Nelson gave hundreds of golf exhibitions across the country to raise money for charitable causes, often partnering with Harold "Jug" McSpaden, who was also exempt from military service.

== Career highlights ==
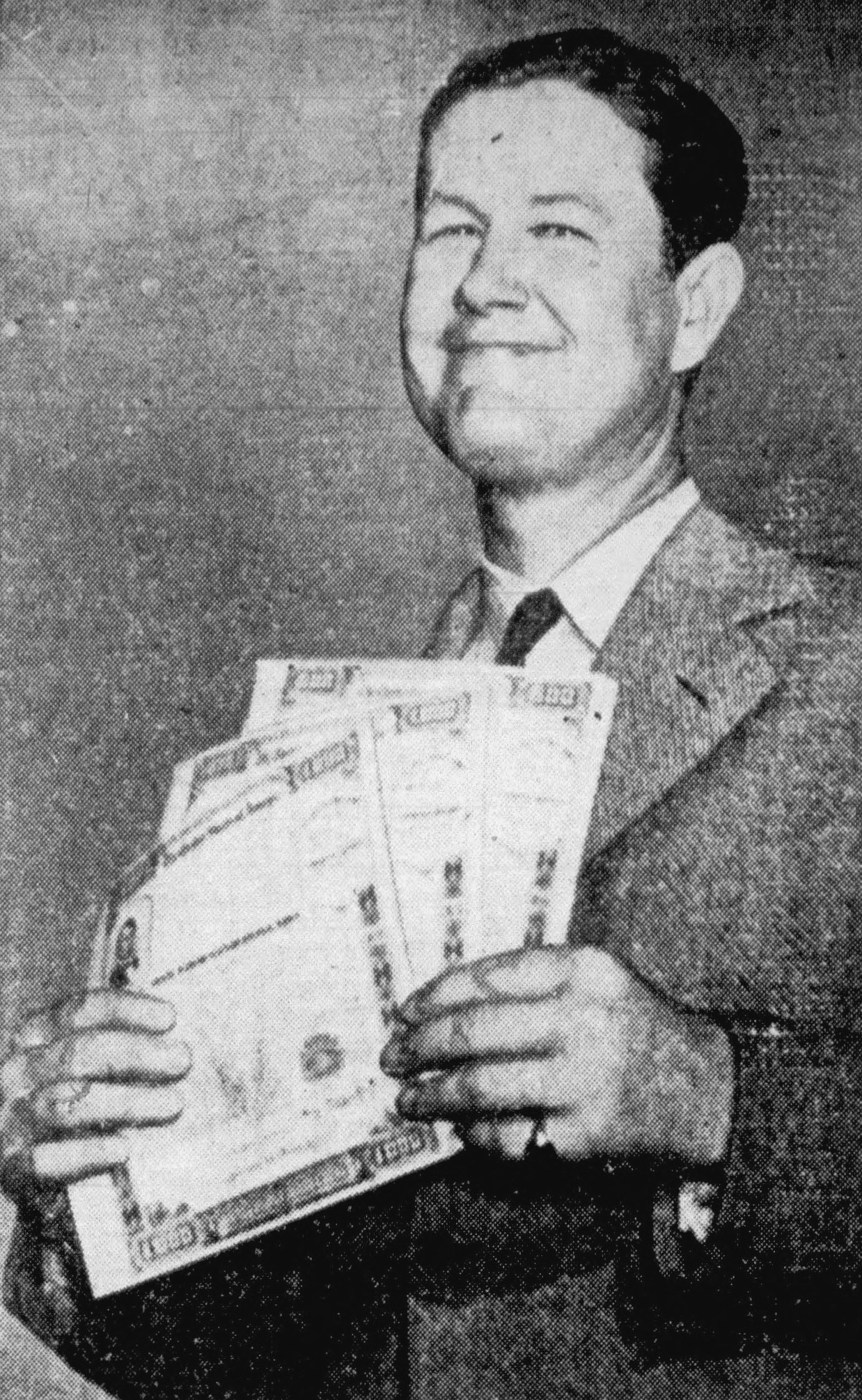
Nelson holding $8,000 worth of war bonds he won during eight major tournaments in 1944.

In his career, Nelson won 52 professional events, and, along with McSpaden, was one of golf's "Gold Dust Twins".

Nelson won the Vardon Trophy in 1939. He played on two Ryder Cup teams, in 1937 and 1947, and was non-playing captain in 1965. After 1946, Nelson curtailed his schedule, although he continued to make regular appearances at The Masters as a competitor, played occasional Tour events, appeared in a few overseas tournaments, and later served as a ceremonial starter for many years.

=== Record-breaking year ===
In 1945, Nelson enjoyed a record-breaking year, winning 18 PGA tournaments out of the 30 he played, including 11 in a row that he played in. Both records are yet to be beaten. Nelson's run of 11 wins started in March with the Miami International Four-Ball, where he partnered with Jug McSpaden. He then won 10 individual events ending with the Canadian Open in August, a run that finished when he finished tied for fourth place in the Memphis Invitational. During this run, he won the 1945 PGA Championship, the only major championship played that year. The week after the PGA Championship he missed the St. Paul Open with a back injury. There has been debate as to how impressive these results are, as it was believed to be a weakened tour due to the war. But in reality many of the leading golfers of that time, including Sam Snead and Ben Hogan still played a full or at least part schedule that year. Snead won 6 times in 1945 while Hogan won 5 times in the latter part of the year. During this year Nelson finished second another 7 times, set a record for the scoring average (68.33 for 18 holes) that was broken by Tiger Woods in 2000, a record 18 hole score (62), and a record 72-hole score (259, which beat the previous record set by Ben Hogan earlier that year). This year is now known as the greatest single year by a player on the PGA Tour, as Arnold Palmer said: "I don't think that anyone will ever exceed the things that Byron did by winning 11 tournaments in a row in one year." Even more recently, Tiger Woods referred to the year as "one of the great years in the history of the sport".

=== Cut streak ===
Nelson's record of 113 consecutive cuts made is second only to Tiger Woods' 142. The PGA Tour defines a "cut" as receiving a paycheck, even if an event has no cut per se. In Nelson's era, only the top 20 in a tournament received a check. In reality, Nelson's "113 consecutive cuts made" are representative of his unequaled 113 consecutive top 20 tournament finishes. Almost half of those top 20s were during the weakened tour war years of 1944 & 1945. In fact, 26 of Nelson's 52 tour wins were during those two weakened tour years of 1944 & 1945. Before 1944 he had never won more than 4 events in any year.

=== First to win 50 PGA Tour events ===
With his win at the 1946 Columbus Invitational, Nelson became the first player to reach 50 career PGA Tour wins. This feat has since been matched by Ben Hogan, Sam Snead, Arnold Palmer, Jack Nicklaus, Billy Casper, and Tiger Woods.

=== Notable performances ===
Nelson achieved several notable performances of scoring and accuracy at key moments in major championships:

- 1937 Masters: Nelson scored a birdie and an eagle on holes 12 and 13 in the final round, making up six strokes on his main rival Ralph Guldahl, who played those same holes with a double bogey and a bogey; Nelson went on to win.
- 1939 U.S. Open: Nelson hit the flagstick six times on approach shots during the regulation 72 holes and the 36 playoff holes, he won the championship.
- 1945 PGA Championship: In the semi-final 36-hole match against Jim Turnesa, Nelson was down four holes with five holes remaining. He played those finishing holes with an eagle and four birdies to win the match; Turnesa scored a birdie and four pars over those holes; Nelson won the title the next day.

== Retirement ==
Nelson retired officially at the relatively early age of 34 to become a rancher, buying a ranch in Roanoke, Texas.

Nelson later became a television golf commentator, during the 1960s and 1970s on ABC Sports.

=== Byron Nelson Classic ===
From 1968, Nelson lent both his name and support to the Byron Nelson Golf Classic in Dallas; this was the first regularly-held PGA Tour event to be named for a professional golfer; the tournament had been previously staged as the Dallas Open.

=== Late-career competition, wins ===
As a former Masters champion, he continued to play in that annual tournament, placing in the top-10 six times between 1947 and 1955, and as high as 15th in 1965, at age 53. From 1947 to 1955 Nelson played in 12 majors and won none.

Nelson did win the 1951 Bing Crosby Pro-Am, a PGA Tour event that he had not won before. He also won the 1955 French Open. Nelson gave paid golf exhibitions for many years after he retired from the Tour, notably after his 1951 Crosby victory.

=== Writes memoirs ===
Nelson published his memoir "How I Played The Game" in 1993 (by Taylor Publishing, Dallas).

Over nearly 70 years in the sport, Nelson played with many celebrities and well-known personalities, including: Roone Arledge, Bing Crosby, James Garner, Bob Hope, Bobby Knight, Randolph Scott, Ed Sullivan, Johnny Weissmuller, Lawrence Welk, and Babe Zaharias.

=== Coach and mentor ===
Among the rising golf talents Nelson coached and mentored, from the 1950s to the 1970s, are World Golf Hall of Fame members Ken Venturi and Tom Watson, along with Marty Fleckman (who won the 1965 NCAA title and one PGA Tour event), and the dominant amateur Harvie Ward.

== Death and legacy ==
Nelson died Tuesday, September 26, 2006. According to a family friend, Nelson died at his Roanoke, Texas home around noon. He was survived by Peggy, his wife of nearly 20 years, sister Margaret Ellen Sherman (1920–2007), and brother Charles (1926–2018), a professor emeritus at Abilene Christian University, where Byron Nelson had been a trustee and benefactor. Nelson met his second wife, the former Peggy (McDonald) Simmons of Toledo, Ohio, when she volunteered at the Bogie Busters celebrity golf tournament in Dayton, Ohio in 1985.

Nelson was often referred to as "Lord Byron", after the English poet by that name, in recognition of his reputation for gentlemanly conduct, a nickname given him by Atlanta sports journalist O. B. Keeler. Many of his obituaries referenced this reputation.

Nelson had several successful years as a television golf commentator. Among the memorable events he broadcast was the 1966 U.S. Open for ABC Sports. Nelson's comments as Arnold Palmer let slip a big lead to Billy Casper on the final nine holes: "A few holes ago, everybody thought this championship was over. Golf is the strangest game in the world." It was at the 1974 U.S. Open that Nelson met Watson for the first time, and the two connected after Watson let a big lead get away in the final round.

Nelson was ranked as the fifth greatest golfer of all time by Golf Digest magazine in 2000. On this list, Jack Nicklaus was first, Nelson's longtime rivals Ben Hogan and Sam Snead were second and third respectively, and Bobby Jones was fourth. A 2009 Sports Illustrated panel ranked him seventh on its list of all-time greatest golfers, behind Nicklaus, Tiger Woods, Jones, Hogan, Snead, and Arnold Palmer.

The "Iron Byron" electro-mechanical machine or robot, developed by Battelle Memorial Institute and True Temper Sports and used by the United States Golf Association and golf manufacturers to compare and test clubs and balls for conformity to standards, was named for Nelson, honoring the consistency of his swing.

In Jack Nicklaus's 1978 book On and Off the Fairway, Nicklaus wrote that Nelson was the straightest golfer he ever saw. The two never played competitively (except at the Masters; Nicklaus won in 1965, Nelson finished tied for 15th), but a 14-year-old Nicklaus was in the crowd at the 1954 U.S. Junior Amateur, when Nelson gave an exhibition hitting golf shots.

== Posthumous honors ==
State Highway 114 Business through Roanoke, Texas is named Byron Nelson Boulevard, in honor of Nelson's residence; the street he lived on was recently changed to Eleven Straight Lane in honor of his 1945 record. In Irving, Texas a street immediately adjacent to the Four Seasons Resort and Club, where the HP Byron Nelson Championship is played each year, is named Byron Nelson Lane. A street in Southlake, Texas, Byron Nelson Parkway, was named in his honor, as was a street in a residential neighborhood in McAllen, Texas.

On September 29, 2006, the United States Senate approved Senate Resolution 602 awarding Byron Nelson the Congressional Gold Medal, the highest award bestowed by the Legislative Branch of the United States government. The resolution cites Mr. Nelson's "significant contributions to the game of golf as a player, a teacher, and a commentator". Representative Michael C. Burgess (R-TX) sponsored the resolution, originally proposed on March 8, 2006, well before Nelson's death. On June 27, 2007, Peggy Nelson, Byron Nelson's surviving wife, was presented with the medal.

On April 23, 2007, the Northwest Independent School District named their second high school Byron Nelson High School. This is the first high school named in honor of Byron Nelson and opened in the fall of 2009. The school is located in Trophy Club, Texas, near Nelson's hometown of Roanoke.

Artist Chelle Adams painted two portraits of Byron Nelson in dedication which hang in the school's auditorium. Orange County Choppers built three choppers in dedication which were auctioned off.

== Professional wins (64) ==
=== PGA Tour wins (52) ===
Legend
Major championships (5)
Other PGA Tour (47)

No.	Date	Tournament	Winning score	Margin of victory	Runner(s)-up
1	Aug 10, 1935	New Jersey State Open	+4 (75-71-70-72=288)	3 strokes	(United States) Jack Forrester
2	May 23, 1936	Metropolitan Open	+3 (71-69-72-71=283)	2 strokes	(United States) Craig Wood
3	Apr 4, 1937	Masters Tournament	−5 (66-72-75-70=283)	2 strokes	(United States) Ralph Guldahl
4	Sep 28, 1937	Belmont International Open	5 and 4		(United States) Henry Picard
5	Feb 27, 1938	Thomasville Open	−8 (66-73-71-70=280)	4 strokes	(United States) Dick Metz
6	Mar 11, 1938	Hollywood Open	−9 (71-68-69-67=275)	1 stroke	(United States) Frank Moore, (United States) Horton Smith
7	Feb 5, 1939	Phoenix Open	−15 (68-65-65=198)	12 strokes	(United States) Ben Hogan
8	Mar 23, 1939	North and South Open	−8 (71-68-70-71=280)	2 strokes	(United States) Horton Smith
9	Jun 12, 1939	U.S. Open	+8 (72-73-71-68=284)	Playoff	(United States) Denny Shute, (United States) Craig Wood
10	Jul 23, 1939	Western Open	−2 (68-72-70-71=281)	1 stroke	(United States) Lloyd Mangrum
11	Feb 12, 1940	Texas Open	−13 (68-67-69-67=271)	Playoff	(United States) Ben Hogan
12	Sep 2, 1940	PGA Championship	1 up		(United States) Sam Snead
13	Dec 15, 1940	Miami Open	−9 (69-65-67-70=271)	1 stroke	(United States) Clayton Heafner
14	Mar 23, 1941	Greater Greensboro Open	−6 (72-64-70-70=276)	2 strokes	(United States) Vic Ghezzi
15	Sep 7, 1941	Tam O'Shanter National Open	−10 (67-69-72-70=278)	1 stroke	(United States) Leonard Dodson, (United States) Ben Hogan
16	Dec 14, 1941	Miami Open (2)	−11 (70-67-66-66=269)	5 strokes	(United States) Ben Hogan
17	Jan 18, 1942	Oakland Open	−6 (67-69-69-69=274)	5 strokes	(United States) Johnny Dawson (a)
18	Apr 13, 1942	Masters Tournament (2)	−8 (68-67-72-73=280)	Playoff	(United States) Ben Hogan
19	Jul 27, 1942	Tam O'Shanter National Open (2)	−8 (67-71-65-77=280)	Playoff	(United States) Clayton Heafner
20	Jan 17, 1944	San Francisco Victory Open	−13 (68-69-68-70=275)	6 strokes	(United States) Jug McSpaden
21	Apr 2, 1944	Knoxville War Bond Tournament	−10 (69-68-66-67=270)	1 stroke	(United States) Jug McSpaden
22	Jun 18, 1944	New York Red Cross Tournament	−13 (69-69-66-71=275)	4 strokes	(United States) Vic Ghezzi
23	Jul 9, 1944	Golden Valley Four-Ball (with (United States) Jug McSpaden)	+13 points	3 points	(United States) Bob Hamilton and (United States) Bill Kaiser
24	Aug 28, 1944	All American Open (3)	−8 (68-70-73-69=280)	5 strokes	(United States) Ed Dudley
25	Sep 4, 1944	Nashville Invitational	−15 (64-67-68-70=269)	1 stroke	(United States) Jug McSpaden
26	Sep 10, 1944	Texas Victory Open	−8 (69-69-70-68=276)	10 strokes	(United States) Jug McSpaden
27	Dec 4, 1944	San Francisco Open (2)	−7 (72-71-69-69=281)	1 stroke	(United States) Jim Ferrier
28	Jan 14, 1945	Phoenix Open (2)	−10 (68-65-72-69=274)	2 strokes	(United States) Denny Shute
29	Feb 4, 1945	Corpus Christi Open	−16 (66-63-65-70=264)	4 strokes	(United States) Jug McSpaden
30	Feb 13, 1945	New Orleans Open	−4 (70-70-73-71=284)	Playoff	(United States) Jug McSpaden
31	Mar 11, 1945	Miami International Four-Ball (with (United States) Jug McSpaden)	8 and 6		(United States) Sammy Byrd and (United States) Denny Shute
32	Mar 21, 1945	Charlotte Open	−16 (70-68-66-68=272)	Playoff	(United States) Sam Snead
33	Mar 25, 1945	Greater Greensboro Open (2)	−13 (70-67-68-66=271)	8 strokes	(United States) Sammy Byrd
34	Apr 1, 1945	Durham Open	−4 (71-69-71-65=276)	5 strokes	(United States) Toney Penna
35	Apr 8, 1945	Atlanta Open	−13 (64-69-65-65=263)	9 strokes	(United States) Sammy Byrd
36	Jun 10, 1945	Montreal Open	−20 (63-68-69-68=268)	10 strokes	(United States) Jug McSpaden
37	Jun 17, 1945	Philadelphia Inquirer Open	−11 (68-68-70-63=269)	2 strokes	(United States) Jug McSpaden
38	Jul 1, 1945	Chicago Victory National Open	−13 (69-68-68-70=275)	7 strokes	(United States) Ky Laffoon, (United States) Jug McSpaden
39	Jul 15, 1945	PGA Championship (2)	4 and 3		(United States) Sammy Byrd
40	Jul 30, 1945	All American Open (4)	−19 (66-68-68-67=269)	11 strokes	(United States) Ben Hogan, (United States) Gene Sarazen
41	Aug 4, 1945	Canadian Open	E (68-72-72-68=280)	4 strokes	(United States) Herman Barron
42	Aug 26, 1945	Knoxville Invitational (2)	−12 (67-69-73-67=276)	10 strokes	(United States) Sammy Byrd
43	Sep 23, 1945	Esmeralda Open	−22 (66-66-70-64=266)	7 strokes	(United States) Jug McSpaden
44	Oct 14, 1945	Seattle Open	−21 (62-68-63-66=259)	13 strokes	(United States) Harry Givan (a), (United States) Jug McSpaden
45	Dec 16, 1945	Fort Worth Open	−11 (65-72-66-70=273)	8 strokes	(United States) Jimmy Demaret
46	Jan 7, 1946	Los Angeles Open	E (71-69-72-72=284)	5 strokes	(United States) Ben Hogan
47	Jan 13, 1946	San Francisco Open (3)	−1 (73-70-72-68=283)	9 strokes	(United States) Herman Barron
48	Feb 17, 1946	New Orleans Open (2)	−11 (73-69-69-66=277)	5 strokes	(United States) Ben Hogan
49	May 12, 1946	Houston Open	−10 (70-69-67-68=274)	2 strokes	(United States) Ben Hogan
50	Jul 7, 1946	Columbus Invitational	−12 (72-68-69-67=276)	2 strokes	(United States) Ed Oliver
51	Jul 21, 1946	Chicago Victory National Open (2)	−5 (73-69-69-68=279)	2 strokes	(United States) Jug McSpaden
52	Jan 14, 1951	Bing Crosby Pro-Am	−7 (71-67-71=209)	3 strokes	(United States) Cary Middlecoff

PGA Tour playoff record (6–4)

No.	Year	Tournament	Opponent(s)	Result
1	1939	U.S. Open	(United States) Denny Shute, (United States) Craig Wood	Won second 18-hole playoff; Nelson: +1 (70), Wood: +4 (73); Level after first 18-hole playoff; Nelson: −1 (68), Wood: −1 (68), Shute: +7 (76)
2	1940	Texas Open	(United States) Ben Hogan	Won 18-hole playoff; Nelson: −1 (70), Hogan: E (71)
3	1941	Florida West Coast Open	(United States) Horton Smith	Lost 18-hole playoff; Smith: −3 (68), Nelson: −2 (69)
4	1942	Masters Tournament	(United States) Ben Hogan	Won 18-hole playoff; Nelson: −3 (69), Hogan: −2 (70)
5	1942	Tam O'Shanter National Open	(United States) Clayton Heafner	Won 18-hole playoff; Nelson: −5 (67), Heafner: −1 (71)
6	1944	Phoenix Open	(United States) Jug McSpaden	Lost 18-hole playoff; McSpaden: −1 (70), Nelson: +1 (72)
7	1945	New Orleans Open	(United States) Jug McSpaden	Won 18-hole playoff; Nelson: −7 (65), McSpaden: −2 (70)
8	1945	Gulfport Open	(United States) Sam Snead	Lost to par on first extra after 18-hole playoff; Snead: E (71), Nelson: E (71)
9	1945	Charlotte Open	(United States) Sam Snead	Won second 18-hole playoff; Nelson: −3 (69), Snead: +1 (73); Level after first 18-hole playoff; Nelson: −3 (69), Snead: −3 (69)
10	1946	U.S. Open	(United States) Vic Ghezzi, (United States) Lloyd Mangrum	Mangrum won second 18-hole playoff; Mangrum: E (72), Ghezzi: +1 (73), Nelson: +1 (73); Level after first 18-hole playoff; Ghezzi: E (72), Mangrum: E (72), Nelson: E (72)

=== Other wins (12) ===
(This list may be incomplete)

- 1937 Central Pennsylvania Open
- 1939 Massachusetts Open
- 1940 Ohio Open
- 1941 Ohio Open, Seminole Pro-Am
- 1942 Toledo Open, Ohio Open
- 1943 Kentucky Open
- 1944 New York Open, Beverly Hills Open
- 1948 Texas PGA Championship
- 1955 French Open

== Major championships ==
=== Wins (5) ===
Year	Championship	54 holes	Winning score	Margin	Runner(s)-up
1937	Masters Tournament	4 shot deficit	−5 (66-72-75-70=283)	2 strokes	(United States) Ralph Guldahl
1939	U.S. Open	5 shot deficit	+8 (72-73-71-68=284)	Playoff ^{1}	(United States) Denny Shute, (United States) Craig Wood
1940	PGA Championship	match play	1 up		(United States) Sam Snead
1942	Masters Tournament (2)	2 shot lead	−8 (68-67-72-73=280)	Playoff ^{2}	(United States) Ben Hogan
1945	PGA Championship (2)	match play	4 & 3		(United States) Sammy Byrd

Note: The PGA Championship was match play until 1958
^{1} Defeated Craig Wood and Denny Shute in a 36-hole playoff - Nelson (68-70=138), Wood (68-73=141), Shute (76) (eliminated after first 18)
^{2} Defeated Ben Hogan in an 18-hole playoff - Nelson 69 (−3), Hogan 70 (−2)

=== Results timeline ===
Tournament	1934	1935	1936	1937	1938	1939
Masters Tournament		T9	T13	1	5	7
U.S. Open	CUT	T32	CUT	T20	T5	1
The Open Championship				5		
PGA Championship				QF	QF	2

Tournament	1940	1941	1942	1943	1944	1945	1946	1947	1948	1949
Masters Tournament	3	2	1	NT	NT	NT	T7	T2	T8	T8
U.S. Open	T5	T17	NT	NT	NT	NT	T2			CUT
The Open Championship	NT	NT	NT	NT	NT	NT				
PGA Championship	1	2	SF	NT	2	1	QF			

Tournament	1950	1951	1952	1953	1954	1955	1956	1957	1958	1959
Masters Tournament	T4	T8	T24	T29	T12	T10	39	T16	T20	WD
U.S. Open						T28				
The Open Championship						T32				
PGA Championship										

Tournament	1960	1961	1962	1963	1964	1965	1966
Masters Tournament	CUT	T32	T33	CUT	CUT	T15	CUT
U.S. Open							
The Open Championship							
PGA Championship							

Win
Top 10
Did not play

NT = no tournament
WD = withdrew
CUT = missed the half-way cut
R64, R32, R16, QF, SF = Round in which player lost in PGA Championship match play
"T" indicates a tie for a place

=== Summary ===
Tournament	Wins	2nd	3rd	Top-5	Top-10	Top-25	Events	Cuts made
Masters Tournament	2	2	1	7	14	20	29	24
U.S. Open	1	1	0	4	4	6	11	8
The Open Championship	0	0	0	1	1	1	2	2
PGA Championship	2	3	1	9	9	9	9	9
Totals	5	6	2	21	28	36	51	43

- Most consecutive cuts made – 26 (1937 Masters – 1949 Masters)
- Longest streak of top-10s – 12 (1937 Open Championship – 1941 Masters)

== Awards ==
- Vardon Trophy: 1939
- PGA Tour leading money winner: 1944, 1945
- Associated Press Male Athlete of the Year: 1944, 1945
- Bob Jones Award: 1974
- World Golf Hall of Fame: 1974
- Old Tom Morris Award: 1994
- PGA Tour Lifetime Achievement Award: 1997
- Payne Stewart Award: 2000
- Congressional Gold Medal: 2006

== See also ==
- Byron Nelson Award
- List of golfers with most PGA Tour wins
- List of longest PGA Tour win streaks
- List of men's major championships winning golfers
- Most PGA Tour wins in a year
