= Knoxville Invitational =

Golf tournament formerly on the PGA Tour

The Knoxville Invitational was a golf tournament on the PGA Tour that was held in Knoxville, Tennessee from 1944 to 1946. The 1944 event was held at Whittle Springs Golf Course while those in 1945 and 1946 were held at the Holston Hills Country Club. The 7,009-yard course opened in 1927 and was designed by Donald Ross.

Byron Nelson won in 1944 and retained the title during his record-setting year of 18 wins including 11 consecutively. The 1946 event was won by Herman Keiser.

== Winners ==
Year	Player	Country	Score	To par	Margin of victory	Runner-up	Winner's share ($)	Ref
Knoxville Invitational
1946	Herman Keiser	United States	291	+3	1 stroke	(United States) Chick Harbert	2,000	
1945	Byron Nelson	United States	276	−12	10 strokes	(United States) Sam Byrd	2,666	
Knoxville War Bond Tournament
1944	Byron Nelson	United States	270	−10	1 stroke	(United States) Jug McSpaden	1,333	
