= 1939 U.S. Open (golf) =

Coordinates: 40.062°N 75.292°W

Tournament information
- Dates: June 8–12, 1939
- Location: Gladwyne, Pennsylvania
- Course(s): Philadelphia Country Club; Spring Mill Course
- Organized by: USGA
- Tour: PGA Tour

Statistics
- Par: 69
- Length: 6,786 yards (6,205 m)
- Field: 161 players, 65 after cut
- Cut: 152 (+14)
- Prize fund: $5,000
- Winner's share: $1,000

Champion
- (United States) Byron Nelson
- 284 (+8), playoff

Location in the United States

The 1939 U.S. Open was the 43rd U.S. Open, held June 8–12 at Philadelphia Country Club in Gladwyne, Pennsylvania, a suburb northwest of Philadelphia. Byron Nelson won after two playoff rounds to prevail against Craig Wood and Denny Shute to claim his only U.S. Open title, and the second of his five major championships. It was the first playoff at the U.S. Open in eight years and the first three-way playoff since 1913.

Sam Snead led after each of the first two rounds but his triple-bogey on the 72nd hole dropped him to fifth place, two strokes back. Two years earlier, he was runner-up in his first U.S. Open in 1937. Following World War II, Snead finished second three more times, but never won the title to complete a career grand slam.

In his fourth U.S. Open, Ben Hogan made his first 36-hole cut at the championship and finished in a tie for 62nd. He finished in a tie for fifth the following year; after the war he won four U.S. Opens and contended in numerous others. He made every subsequent cut he played in at the U.S. Open, the last in 1967 at age 54.

== Round summaries ==
=== First round ===
Thursday, June 8, 1939

Place	Player	Score	To Par
1	(United States) Sam Snead	68	−1
T2	(United States) Lawson Little	69	E
T2	(United States) Bud Ward (a)	69	E
T2	(United States) Matt Kowal	69	E
T5	(United States) Craig Wood	70	+1
T5	(United States) Tommy Armour	70	+1
T5	(United States) Denny Shute	70	+1
T5	(United States) Olin Dutra	70	+1
T5	(United States) Lloyd Mangrum	70	+1
T5	(United States) Harold "Jug" McSpaden	70	+1

=== Second round ===
Friday, June 9, 1939

Place	Player	Score	To Par
1	(United States) Sam Snead	68-71=139	+1
2	(United States) Horton Smith	72-68=140	+2
3	(United States) Craig Wood	70-71=141	+3
T4	(United States) Denny Shute	70-72=142	+4
T4	(United States) Bud Ward (a)	69-73=142	+4
T6	(United States) Frank Moore	73-70=143	+5
T6	(United States) Johnny Bulla	72-71=143	+5
T6	(United States) Harry Cooper	71-72=143	+5
T6	(United States) Harold "Jug" McSpaden	70-73=143	+5
T6	(United States) Lawson Little	69-74=143	+5

=== Third round ===
Saturday, June 10, 1939 - (morning)

Place	Player	Score	To Par
1	(United States) Johnny Bulla	72-71-68=211	+4
T2	(United States) Sam Snead	68-71-73=212	+5
T2	(United States) Craig Wood	70-71-71=212	+5
T2	(United States) Denny Shute	70-72-70=212	+5
5	(United States) Bud Ward (a)	69-73-71=213	+6
T6	(United States) Tommy Armour	70-75-69=214	+7
T6	(United States) John E. Rogers	75-70-69=214	+7
T6	(United States) Olin Dutra	70-74-70=214	+7
9	(United States) Horton Smith	72-68-75=215	+8
T10	(United States) Byron Nelson	72-73-71=216	+9
T10	(United States) Ralph Guldahl	71-73-72=216	+9
T10	(United States) Henry Picard	72-72-72=216	+9

=== Final round ===
Saturday, June 10, 1939 - (afternoon)

Nelson began the final round on Saturday afternoon five strokes back of leader Johnny Bulla and shot 68 to gain the clubhouse lead at 284. Wood birdied the 18th to also get to 284, while Shute also finished on that number after a bogey at 17. It appeared, however, that that number would not be enough. Snead stood on the par-5 18th needing only a par to win the championship. Snead believed he needed a birdie to win and played the hole aggressively. After finding two bunkers, he made a triple-bogey 8 and missed the playoff by two strokes.

Place	Player	Score	To Par	Money ($)
T1	(United States) Byron Nelson	72-73-71-68=284	+8	Playoff
T1	(United States) Craig Wood	70-71-71-72=284	+8	Playoff
T1	(United States) Denny Shute	70-72-70-72=284	+8	Playoff
4	(United States) Bud Ward (a)	69-73-71-72=285	+9	0
5	(United States) Sam Snead	68-71-73-74=286	+10	600
6	(United States) Johnny Bulla	72-71-68-76=287	+11	450
T7	(United States) Ralph Guldahl	71-73-72-72=288	+12	325
T7	(United States) Dick Metz	76-72-71-69=288	+12	325
T9	(United States) Ky Laffoon	76-70-73-70=289	+13	175
T9	(United States) Harold McSpaden	70-73-71-75=289	+13	175
T9	(United States) Paul Runyan	76-70-71-72=289	+13	175

(a) denotes amateur

=== Playoff ===
Sunday, June 11, 1939
Monday, June 12, 1939

In the three-way 18-hole playoff on Sunday afternoon, Nelson and Wood each carded 68 (−1), while Shute shot a 76 (+7) and was eliminated. In the second 18-hole playoff on Monday morning, Nelson took control at the third hole with a birdie while Wood double-bogeyed. At the next hole, Nelson holed out for an eagle to take a five-stroke lead. With a three-shot lead at the turn, Nelson matched Wood on the back nine and finished with a 70 to Wood's 73.

Place	Player	Score	To par	Money ($)
1	(United States) Byron Nelson	68-70=138	E	1,000
2	(United States) Craig Wood	68-73=141	+3	800
3	(United States) Denny Shute	76-x	+7	700

=== Scorecards ===
Sunday, June 11, 1939

Hole	1	2	3	4	5	6	7	8	9	10	11	12	13	14	15	16	17	18
Par	4	3	4	4	4	4	3	4	4	4	3	4	3	4	4	4	4	5
(United States) Nelson	E	E	E	E	+1	+1	E	E	−1	−1	E	−1	E	E	E	−1	E	−1
(United States) Wood	E	E	E	E	E	−1	−1	−1	−1	E	E	E	E	E	E	E	−1	−1
(United States) Shute	E	+1	+1	+1	+1	+2	+2	+2	+3	+3	+3	+3	+4	+4	+4	+4	+5	+7

Monday, June 12, 1939

Hole	1	2	3	4	5	6	7	8	9	10	11	12	13	14	15	16	17	18
Par	4	3	4	4	4	4	3	4	4	4	3	4	3	4	4	4	4	5
(United States) Nelson	E	E	−1	−3	−2	−1	−1	−1	−1	E	E	+1	+1	+1	+1	+1	+1	+1
(United States) Wood	+1	E	+2	+2	+2	+2	+2	+2	+2	+3	+4	+5	+5	+6	+5	+5	+4	+4

Cumulative playoff scores, relative to par

Eagle	Birdie	Bogey	Double bogey
