= Great Southern Golf Club =

Defunct sports facility

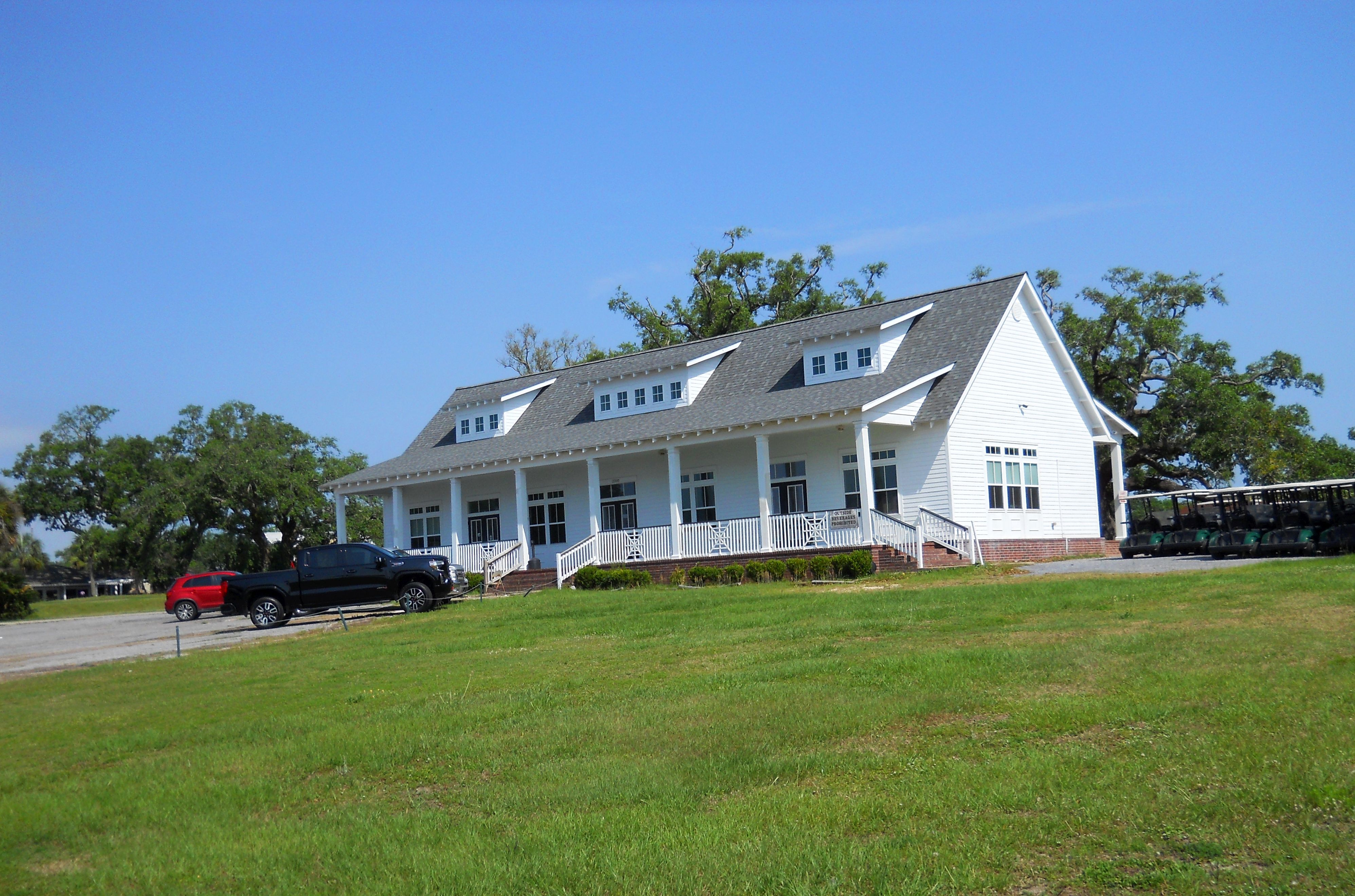
- Clubhouse of the Great Southern Golf Club; May 2022

- Location within Mississippi
- 30.388°N 89.010°W

Club information
- Location: 2000 Beach Dr, Gulfport, Mississippi
- Established: 1908; 118 years ago
- Type: Semi-private
- Tota holes: 18
- Website: golfgreatsouthern.com
- Designed by: Donald Ross (1908), Brian Curley (1999)
- Par: 72
- Length: 6,278 yards (5,741 m)
- Course rating: 69.7
- Slope rating: 117

Great Southern Golf Club was an 18-hole golf course located in Gulfport, Mississippi overlooking the Mississippi Sound. Designed by Donald Ross and built in 1908, the Great Southern Golf Club was the oldest golf course in Mississippi. To satisfy mortgage debts, the land was sold at auction in 2021 to a residential developer. After 114 years of operation, the golf course closed in May 2022 due to lack of funding.

== History ==
When entrepreneur Joseph T. Jones completed construction of the Great Southern Hotel in 1903, he also provided guest amenities to attract more tourists. In 1908, the Jones family funded construction of a 9-hole golf course overlooking the Mississippi Sound to draw in more guests to their hotel.

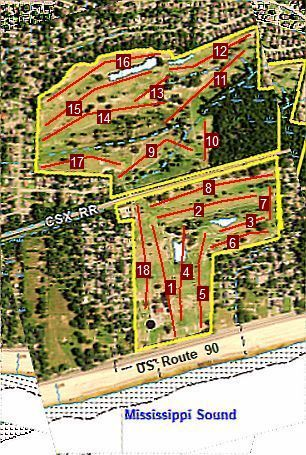
Aerial view of Great Southern Golf course with fairway locations (numbered red lines)

The course was designed by Donald Ross and built by New Orleans architect Charles Nieman. The golf course was located east of the Great Southern Hotel, between Gulfport and Biloxi. In 1910, a clubhouse was built, and the course became the Great Southern Golf and Country Club. In 1921, land north of the L&N Railroad (now CSX Railroad) was acquired, and the golf course was expanded to 18 holes.

=== Years of significance ===
Notable guests and professional golfers who played the course included: Woodrow Wilson, Walter Hagen, Gene Sarazen, Byron Nelson, Sam Snead, Ben Hogan, Glenna Collett-Vare and Babe Didrikson Zaharias.

In March 1944, Jug McSpaden won the first of two PGA Gulfport Open tournaments held at Great Southern Golf Club. Sam Snead defeated Byron Nelson in a playoff at the 1945 Gulfport Open.

Ownership of the course changed hands several times through the years, along with name changes to the course. From the 1960s to 1990s, it was part of the Broadwater Hotel Resort under the name Broadwater Sea Course. In 1964, the club hosted the Mary Mills Mississippi Gulf Coast Invitational that was won by Mickey Wright. In 1993, the course was purchased by local residents and members of the golf club, who renamed it the Great Southern Golf Club.

In 1999, the Great Southern golf course was renovated by architect Brian Curley, who retained the original square greens from Donald Ross's original design.

=== Decline ===
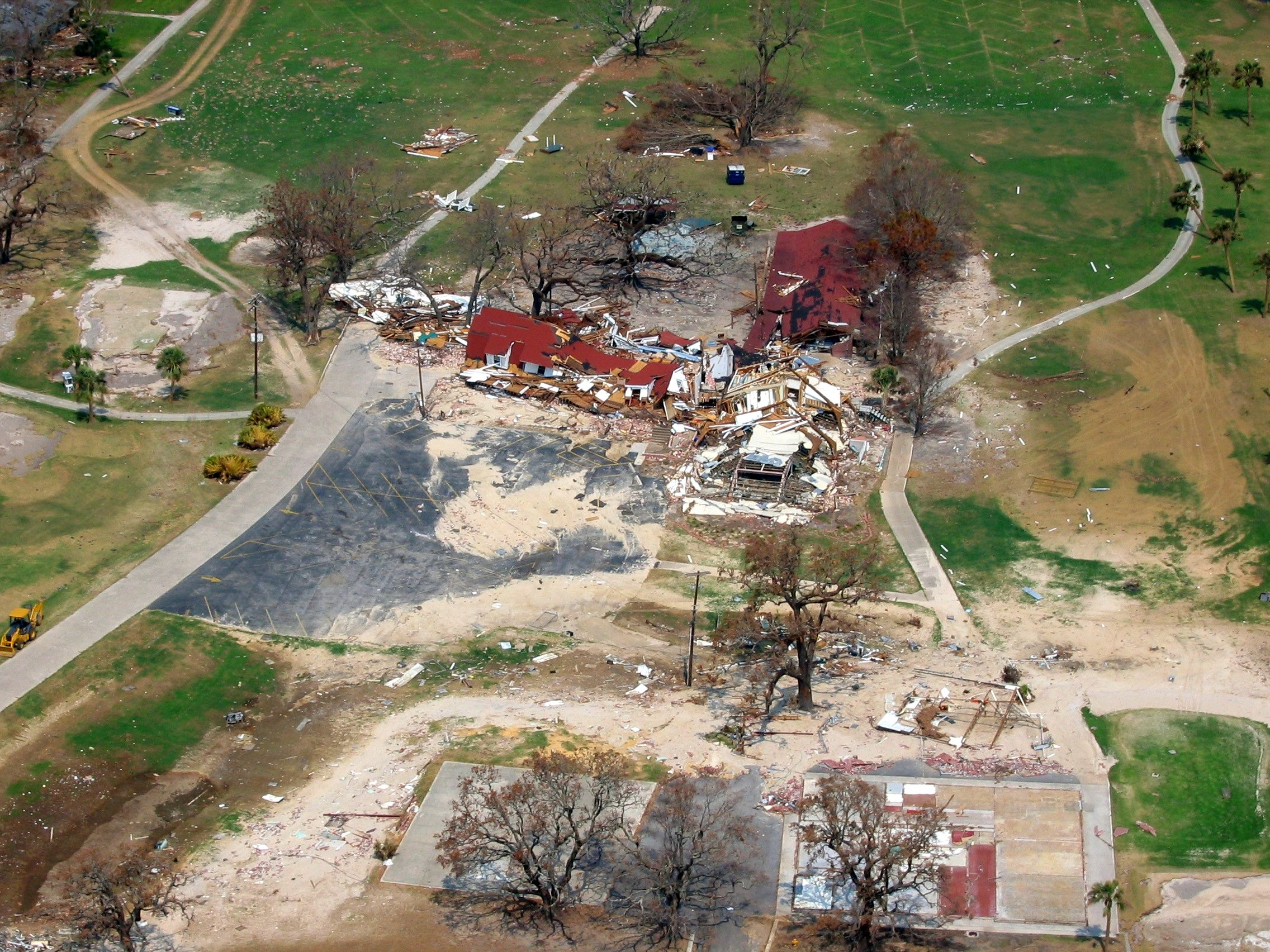
Aerial view of original Great Southern clubhouse 2 weeks after Hurricane Katrina

In 2005, Hurricane Katrina destroyed up to 400 trees on the property and demolished the 95-year-old clubhouse. Flood water from the gulf storm surge decimated the golf course grasses and damaged infrastructure throughout the course. In 2013, a new 4,800 sq ft clubhouse was completed, and the golf course was restored. The debt incurred from storm recovery resulted in a Chapter 11 Bankruptcy filing in 2019, because there was insufficient funding from membership fees and public-play rates to maintain operations.

In 2021, the 129-acre (52 ha) property was sold at auction to a developer with plans to construct single-family homes. In April 2022, after more than 100 years of operation, Great Southern Golf Club announced that Mississippi's oldest golf course would close May 9, 2022.
