= Charlotte Open =

Golf tournament in North Carolina, US

The Charlotte Open was a golf tournament played at Myers Park Country Club in Charlotte, North Carolina, from 1944 to 1948.

== Winners ==
Year	Player	Country	Score	To par	Margin of victory	Runner(s)-up	Winner's share ($)	Ref
1948	Chick Harbert	United States	273	−15	1 stroke	(United States) Cary Middlecoff	2,000	
1947	Cary Middlecoff	United States	277	−11	Playoff	(United States) George Schoux	2,000	
1946	Bob Hamilton	United States	273	−15	3 strokes	(United States) Pete Cooper (United States) Jimmy Demaret (United States) Sam Snead	1,500	
1945	Byron Nelson	United States	272	−16	Playoff	(United States) Sam Snead	2,000	
1944	Dutch Harrison	United States	275	−13	1 stroke	(United States) Jug McSpaden	2,000	
