= Golden Valley Four-Ball =

Golf tournament

The Golden Valley Four-Ball was a golf tournament played at Golden Valley Country Club in Golden Valley, Minnesota in 1943 and 1944. The 1943 event was a round-robin with 8 pairs played from September 3 to 6. One match was played on the first day and two on the other three days. Positions were determined by the net number of holes up or down over the seven rounds. The 1944 event followed a similar format and was played from July 6 to 9.

== Winners ==
Year	Player	Country	Score	Margin of victory	Runners-up	Winner's share ($)	Ref
1944	Byron Nelson and Jug McSpaden	United States; United States	+13	3 points	(United States) Bob Hamilton (United States) Bill Kaiser	800 (each)	
1943	Jimmy Demaret and Craig Wood	United States; United States	+12	3 points	(United States) Byron Nelson (United States) Jug McSpaden	600 (each)	
