= Corpus Christi Open =

Golf tournament

The Corpus Christi Open was a golf tournament played at Corpus Christi Country Club in Corpus Christi, Texas from February 2 to 4, 1945. Prize money was $5,000. The course measured under 6,000 yards. Byron Nelson scored 66-63-65-70 for a total of 264 and won by four strokes from Jug McSpaden.

== Winners ==
Year	Player	Country	Score	To par	Margin of victory	Runner-up	Winner's share ($)	Ref
1945	Byron Nelson	United States	264	−16	4 strokes	(United States) Jug McSpaden	1,000	
