= Philadelphia Inquirer Open =

Golf tournament

The Philadelphia Inquirer Open was a golf tournament on the PGA Tour played at various clubs in the greater Philadelphia area in the 1940s. The first event was played as the Philadelphia Inquirer Open Invitational; it was last played in 1949. Fred Byrod was the Inquirer employee who acted as tournament promoter and liaison with the PGA. At the 1945 event, Byron Nelson won the seventh of his record-setting 11 consecutive victories.

== Tournament hosts ==
| Years | Course |
|---|---|
| 1948–1949 | Whitemarsh Valley Country Club |
| 1947 | Cedarbrook Country Club |
| 1945–1946 | Llanerch Country Club |
| 1944 | Torresdale-Frankford Country Club |

== Winners ==
| Year | Player | Country | Score | To par | Margin of victory | Runner(s)-up | Winner's share ($) | Ref |
Philadelphia Inquirer Open
| 1949 | Joe Kirkwood, Jr. | United States | 276 | −12 | 4 strokes | (United States) Johnny Palmer | 2,600 | |
| 1948 | Johnny Palmer | United States | 281 | −7 | 4 strokes | (United States) Ben Hogan | 2,500 | |
| 1947 | Bobby Locke | South Africa | 277 | −7 | 4 strokes | (United States) Matt Kowal (United States) Lloyd Mangrum | 2,500 | |
| 1946 | Herman Barron | United States | 277 | −3 | Playoff | (United States) Lew Worsham | 2,500 | |
| 1945 | Byron Nelson | United States | 269 | −11 | 2 strokes | (United States) Jug McSpaden | 2,500 | |
Philadelphia Inquirer Open Invitational
| 1944 | Sam Byrd | United States | 274 | −10 | 7 strokes | (United States) Craig Wood | 6,700 | |
