= San Francisco Open =

Golf tournament

The San Francisco Open was a golf tournament played in the San Francisco area. It was played at a number of different courses in the December to February period. From 1930 to 1941 it was a match-play event before becoming a 72-hole stroke play event from 1942 to 1946.

A non-PGA Tour event was played in May 1954 at Lake Merced Golf Club and was won by Shelley Mayfield. It was played over 54 holes and had prize money of $10,000.

== Winners ==
Year	Player	Country	Venue	Score	To par	Margin of victory	Runner-up	Winner's share ($)	Ref
San Francisco Open
1946	Byron Nelson	United States	Olympic Club	283	−1	9 strokes	(United States) Herman Barron	3,000	
1944 (Dec)	Byron Nelson	United States	Harding Park	281	−7	1 stroke	(Australia) Jim Ferrier	2,666	
San Francisco Victory Open
1944 (Jan)	Byron Nelson	United States	Harding Park	275	−13	6 strokes	(United States) Jug McSpaden	2,400	
San Francisco Open
1943	No tournament								
1942	Ben Hogan	United States	California GC	279	−9	3 strokes	(United States) Sam Snead	1,000	
San Francisco National Match Play Open
1941	Johnny Revolta	United States	Presidio	7 & 6			(United States) Harry Cooper	1,000	
1940	Jimmy Demaret	United States	Lake Merced	2 & 1			(United States) Willie Goggin	1,000	
1939	Dick Metz	United States	Olympic Club	1 up			(United States) Horton Smith	1,000	
1938	Jimmy Demaret	United States	San Francisco GC	4 & 3			(United States) Sam Snead	1,000	
1937	Lawson Little	United States	Ingleside	20 holes			(United States) Neil Christian	1,000	
1936	Willie Hunter	United States	Lake Merced	4 & 2			(United States) Willie Goggin	1,500	
1935	Jug McSpaden	United States	Presidio	3 & 2			(United States) Harry Cooper	750	
1934	Tom Creavy	United States	Lake Merced	3 & 2			(United States) Jimmy Thomson	750	
1932	Craig Wood	United States	Olympic Club	2 & 1			(United States) Al Espinosa	500	
1931	Wiffy Cox	United States	Lake Merced	6 & 5			(United States) George Von Elm	1,500	
1930	Leo Diegel	United States	Olympic Club	6 & 4			(United States) Al Espinosa	1,500	
