= Hollywood Open =

Golf tournament

The Hollywood Open was a golf tournament played in Hollywood, Florida from 1936 to 1938. It was played in early March. The 1936 and 1937 events were played at Hollywood Golf and Country Club with the 1938 tournament played at Orangebrook Golf & Country Club.

The Hollywood Beach Hotel Open was also played in the town at the end of 1937. It was won by Leonard Dodson.

== Winners ==
Year	Player	Country	Score	To par	Margin of victory	Runners-up	Winner's share ($)	Ref
1938	Byron Nelson	United States	275	−9	1 stroke	(United States) Frank Moore (United States) Horton Smith	700	
1937	Dick Metz	United States	272	−8	3 strokes	(United States) Johnny Revolta (United States) Paul Runyan	700	
1936	Vic Ghezzi	United States	276	−4	1 stroke	(United States) Toney Penna (Japan) Toichiro Toda	500	
