= Sammy Byrd =

American baseball player and golfer (1906–1981)

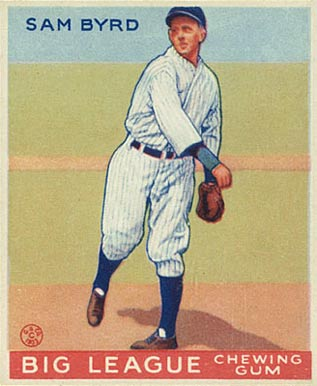
- 1933 Goudey baseball card
- Born: October 5, 1906; Bremen, Georgia, U.S.
- Died: May 11, 1981 (aged 74); Mesa, Arizona, U.S.
- Baseball career
- Outfielder
- Batted: Right Threw: Right

MLB debut
- May 11, 1929, for the New York Yankees

Last MLB appearance
- September 27, 1936, for the Cincinnati Reds

MLB statistics
- Batting average: .274
- Home runs: 38
- Runs batted in: 220
- Stats at Baseball Reference

Teams
- New York Yankees (1929–1934); Cincinnati Reds (1935–1936)

Career highlights and awards
- World Series champion (1932)
- Golf career
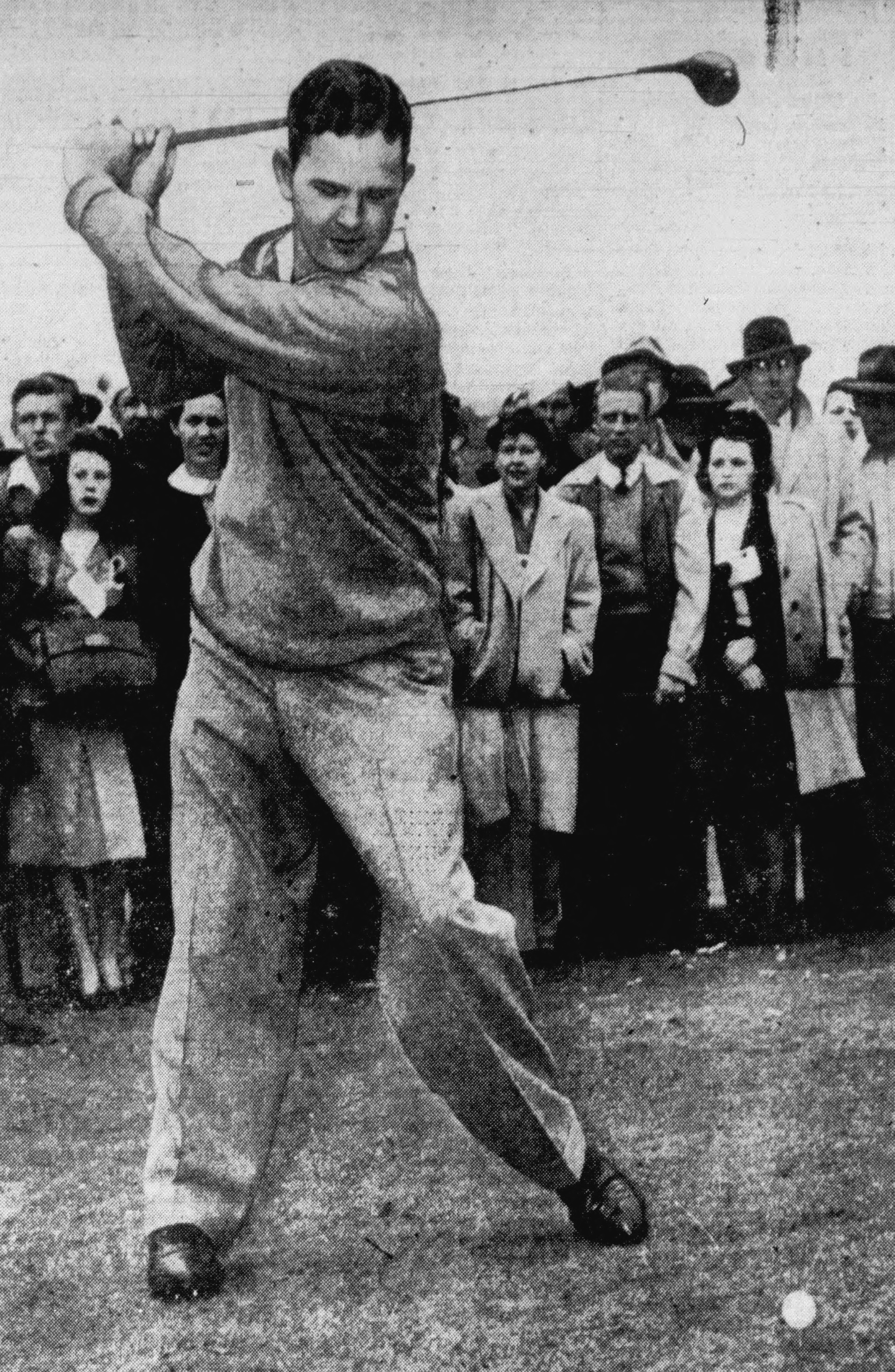
- Byrd in 1946
- Sport: Golf
- Turned professional: 1933
- Former tour: PGA Tour
- Professional wins: 11

Number of wins by tour
- PGA Tour: 6
- Other: 5

Best results in major championships
- Masters Tournament: 3rd: 1941
- PGA Championship: 2nd: 1945
- U.S. Open: T16: 1939
- The Open Championship: DNP

Samuel Dewey Byrd (October 5, 1906 – May 11, 1981) was an American professional baseball outfielder and professional golfer. He played in Major League Baseball (MLB) and on the PGA Tour. Byrd is the only person to play in both the World Series and the Masters Tournament.

Byrd made his professional baseball debut in 1926, and made his MLB debut with the New York Yankees in 1929. He was primarily a reserve player, and saw action as a defensive replacement and pinch runner for Babe Ruth, which earned him the nickname "Babe Ruth's Legs". The Yankees sold Byrd to the Cincinnati Reds before the 1935 season, and he retired from baseball to pursue a career as a professional golfer after the 1936 season. He won six PGA events during his career.

== Early life ==
Samuel Dewey Byrd was born on October 15, 1906, in Bremen, Georgia, as the second of four children of Rhone and Delphia Byrd. He was often known by his middle name when he was growing up. His family moved to Birmingham, Alabama, in 1911. They lived near a golf course, where he worked as a caddy. He graduated from Birmingham's Simpson High School, where he played baseball and basketball. His father, who worked in construction, trained him to be a bricklayer.

== Professional career ==
=== Baseball career ===
After playing sandlot baseball in Birmingham, Byrd signed with the Birmingham Barons of the Class A Southern Association in 1926. The Barons optioned him to the Jonesboro Buffaloes of the Class D Tri-State League before the start of the season. He had a .348 batting average with three home runs in 59 games for Jonesboro. The league folded during the season, and he finished the season with the Alexandria Reds of the Class D Cotton States League, where he batted .238 with one home run in 25 games. He played for the Knoxville Smokies of the Class B South Atlantic League in 1927, where he batted .331 with 15 home runs in 140 games. During the 1927 season, the New York Yankees purchased Byrd's contract. In 1928, the Yankees optioned Byrd to the Albany Senators of the Class A Eastern League, and he batted .371 with 18 home runs in 130 games.

Byrd made his Major League Baseball debut with the Yankees on May 11, 1929, as a pinch hitter and defensive replacement for Earle Combs. When Babe Ruth fell ill in June, Byrd started for the Yankees in his place from June 2 to 18. He batted .312 with five home runs in 202 plate appearances across 62 games for the Yankees in 1929. In 1930, Byrd batted .284 with six home runs in 254 plate appearances across 92 games. He batted .270 with three home runs in 281 plate appearances across 115 games in 1931.

Byrd got a big opportunity to be the starting center fielder for the Yankees in 1932, as Combs went to the bench. Using a 34-ounce (960 g) baseball bat, in place of the 37-ounce (1,000 g) bats he usually used, helped him to match his home run total for all of 1931 before April 1932 ended. By May, Byrd was experiencing sinus problems and Combs had retaken the starting center fielding job. Aside from a 15 game stretch in September, Byrd spent the rest of the 1932 season backing up the starting outfield of Ruth, Combs, and Ben Chapman. He finished the 1932 season with a .297 average and eight home runs in 243 plate appearances across 105 games. Byrd made one appearance in the 1932 World Series as a defensive replacement for Ruth in the bottom of the ninth inning of Game 4. In 1933, Byrd batted .280 with two home runs in 122 plate appearances in 85 games. In 1934, he batted .246 with three home runs in 218 plate appearances across 106 games. Byrd led American League outfielders with a .988 fielding percentage in 1934, committing two errors in 160 chances.

After the 1934 season, the Yankees sold Byrd to the Cincinnati Reds. Byrd played for the Reds as a starting outfielder in 1935, alongside Chick Hafey, with Ival Goodman, Harlin Pool, and Adam Comorosky competing for the remaining playing time. He batted .262 with nine home runs in 460 plate appearances in 121 games. Heading into the 1936 season, Cincinnati started Goodman, Babe Herman, and Kiki Cuyler in the outfield, and Byrd returned to a reserve role. He batted .248 with two home runs in 153 plate appearances in 59 games during the 1936 season.

The Reds traded Byrd to the Rochester Red Wings of the International League for Phil Weintraub and Jack Rothrock following the 1936 season. Byrd refused the assignment to the minor leagues, and announced in February 1937 that he was retiring from baseball to focus on his golf career. Cincinnati sent Rochester another player to complete the trade, and sold Byrd to the St. Louis Cardinals, who sent him a new contract for $10,000. After consulting with Jones, Ed Dudley, and Bill McWane, Byrd informed the Cardinals that he still intended to retire and pursue a career in golf.

Byrd was called "Babe Ruth's Legs", a reference to the fact that he often would appear as a pinch runner and defensive replacement for Ruth at the end of games toward the latter part of Ruth's career. In 745 major league games, Byrd posted a .274 batting average (465-for-1,700) with 304 runs, 38 home runs, 220 runs batted in, and a .412 slugging percentage. He recorded a .975 fielding percentage playing at all three outfield positions.

=== Golf career ===
Upon joining the Yankees, Byrd quickly developed the reputation of being the best golfer in professional baseball. In 1930, Bobby Jones played a round of golf with Byrd, and called Byrd "the very best man with a driver I ever saw." Byrd won the first tournament he entered, the amateur portion of the 1933 Southeastern PGA Open. He made his professional golf debut in a tournament at the Pinehurst Resort in November 1933. In January 1937, he won a golf tournament of baseball players in Sarasota, Florida, by fourteen strokes.

When Byrd retired from baseball in 1937, he became an assistant to Dudley at the Philadelphia Country Club. He tied with Abe Espinosa for fifth place in the 1938 Crescent City Open and tied with Ralph Guldahl for fourth place of the 1938 St. Petersburg Open Invitational. In July 1939, Byrd won the Philadelphia Open Championship. In 1940, Byrd became the golf pro at the Merion Golf Club in Haverford Township, Pennsylvania. He competed in the 1940 Masters Tournament and tied for 14th place, becoming the first person to play in both a World Series and a Masters Tournament.

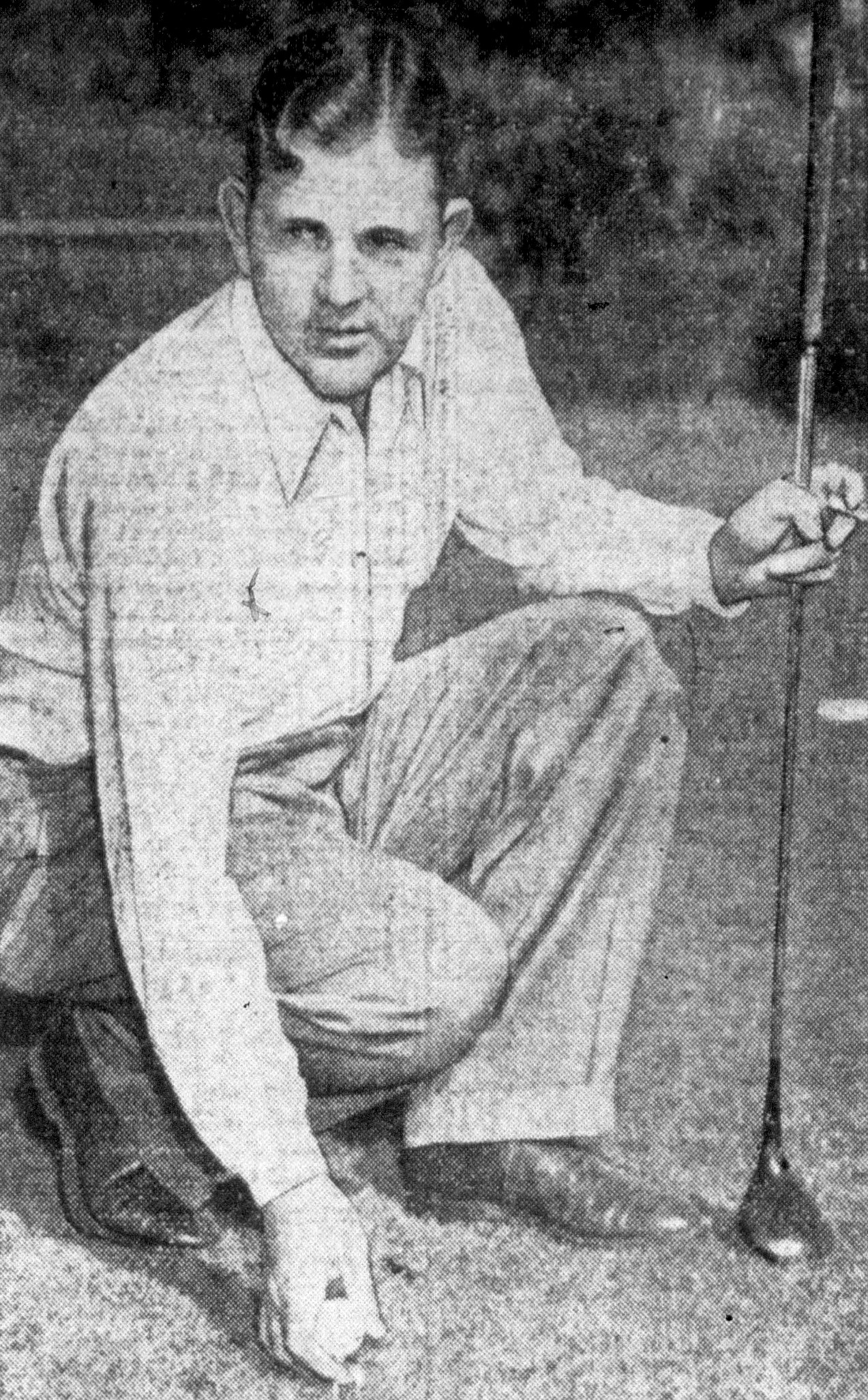
Byrd in 1945

At the 1941 Providence Open, Byrd set a competitive record at Triggs Memorial Golf Course when he shot a 66, six under par, in the first round. He finished in third place in the 1941 Masters Tournament. He won the Greater Greensboro Open in 1942 with a 279, five under par, two strokes ahead of Ben Hogan and Lloyd Mangrum. He finished in fourth place in the 1942 Masters Tournament. In June 1942, Byrd won the Pennsylvania Open Championship by seven shots over Henry Ransom. Byrd setting a course record with a 64, seven under par, in the second round. He won the Chicago Victory National Open in 1943 with a score of 277, five strokes ahead of Craig Wood.

Byrd resigned from the Merion Golf Club to succeed Jimmy Demaret as the golf pro at the Plum Hollow Country Club in Southfield, Michigan, effective November 1, 1943. In February 1944, he won the New Orleans Open with a score of 285, five strokes ahead of Byron Nelson. In June 1944, Byrd won the Philadelphia Inquirer Open Invitational. He won the Michigan PGA Championship in July 1944 with a score of 142, while Harmon, Jack Winney, and Al Watrous tied with 145, and won the Michigan Open in August 1944 with a score of 208, while Claude Harmon finished in second with 214. In January 1945, Byrd won the Texas Open with a score of 268, beating Nelson by one stroke, and setting a new Texas Open record, which had previously been 271. Byrd lost the final of the 1945 PGA Championship to Nelson, 4 and 3, in match play.

Byrd defended his Michigan PGA Championship title in August 1945, beating Chick Rutan by two strokes, 142 to 144. In November 1945, he won the Azalea Open, beating Dutch Harrison in a playoff by one stroke, after they both shot 283. In March 1946, Byrd teamed with Sam Snead in the Inverness Invitational Four-Ball, which they lost to Demaret and Hogan. Byrd hosted the 1947 PGA Championship, which was held at Plum Hollow Country Club. In the 1948 Masters Tournament, he tallied the highest score ever at the second hole, recording a 10. He finished the round with a 12-over-par 84. He retired from the PGA Tour in 1949.

On April 1, 1963, Byrd became the golf pro at Willowbrook Country Club. Byrd won his last tournament, a Senior PGA Tour event, in 1967. He served as the golf pro for ten years at the Anniston County Club in Anniston, Alabama, until he retired in 1978.

== Personal life ==
Byrd married Rachel Elizabeth Smith of Birmingham in October 1932, days after the conclusion of the 1932 World Series. Teammate Bill Dickey was his best man. Their daughter, Catherine, was born in 1939. After Rachel died in 1979, Byrd moved to Gilbert, Arizona, to be closer to his daughter.

In 1940, Mrs. Byrd, an accomplished Philadelphia amateur golfer from Whitemarsh Valley Country Club, played in her first Berthellyn Cup tournament at the Huntingdon Valley Country Club in Philadelphia. Although she did not fare well, she returned in 1941, reaching the semifinals. The Philadelphia Inquirer newspaper described her as "the youthful Whitemarsh club matron, wife of Merion's pro, Sam Byrd." She went on to say that she owes her golfing success to her instructor and husband.

He died in Mesa, Arizona, on May 11, 1981.

== Awards and honors ==
In 1974, Byrd was inducted into the Alabama Sports Hall of Fame for his accomplishments in golf and baseball.

== Professional wins (11) ==
=== PGA Tour wins (6) ===
| No. | Date | Tournament | Winning score | To par | Margin of victory | Runner(s)-up |
|---|---|---|---|---|---|---|
| 1 | Mar 29, 1942 | Greater Greensboro Open | 279 | –5 | 2 strokes | (United States) Ben Hogan (United States) Lloyd Mangrum |
| 2 | Apr 22, 1943 | Chicago Victory National Open | 277 | –7 | 5 strokes | (United States) Craig Wood |
| 3 | Feb 28, 1944 | New Orleans Open | 285 | –3 | 5 strokes | (United States) Byron Nelson |
| 4 | Jun 11, 1944 | Philadelphia Inquirer Open Invitational | 274 | –10 | 7 strokes | (United States) Craig Wood |
| 5 | Jan 28, 1945 | Texas Open | 268 | –16 | 1 stroke | (United States) Byron Nelson |
| 6 | Nov 18, 1945 | Azalea Open | 283 | –5 | Playoff | (United States) Dutch Harrison |

=== Other wins (6) ===
This list is probably incomplete.

- 1939 Philadelphia Open Championship
- 1942 Pennsylvania Open Championship
- 1944 Michigan Open, Michigan PGA Championship
- 1945 Michigan PGA Championship
- 1967 PGA Seniors Teachers Trophy

== Results in major championships ==
| Tournament | 1938 | 1939 | 1940 | 1941 | 1942 | 1943 | 1944 | 1945 | 1946 | 1947 | 1948 | 1949 | 1950 | 1951 |
|---|---|---|---|---|---|---|---|---|---|---|---|---|---|---|
| Masters Tournament | | | T14 | 3 | 4 | NT | NT | NT | 40 | | 47 | | | |
| U.S. Open | CUT | T16 | 41 | T26 | NT | NT | NT | NT | CUT | T23 | | T37 | CUT | T49 |
| PGA Championship | | | | | R32 | NT | R16 | 2 | R64 | R64 | | | R64 | |

Note: Byrd never played in The Open Championship.
Top 10
Did not play
NT = no tournament
CUT = missed the half-way cut
R64, R32, R16, QF, SF = round in which player lost in PGA Championship match play
"T" indicates a tie for a place

== See also ==
- List of Major League Baseball ultimate grand slams
