= Gulfport Open =

Golf tournament formerly on the PGA Tour

The Gulfport Open was a golf tournament on the PGA Tour that played in the 1940s on Mississippi's oldest golf course, the Great Southern Golf Club of Gulfport.

At the 1945 event, Byron Nelson and Sam Snead finished play in regulation tied for the lead. Nineteen holes later, Nelson conceded a putt to Snead giving him the tournament. Later that year, Nelson would complete a record-setting season by winning eighteen tournaments, 11 of them consecutively.

The Great Southern golf club was designed by Donald Ross in 1908.

== Winners ==
- 1945 Sam Snead
- 1944 Harold "Jug" McSpaden
