= Chicago Open =

Golf tournament in Illinois, US

LaSalle Bank Chicago Open
Tournament information
- Location: Chicago, Illinois
- Established: 1914
- Course: Gleneagles Country Club
- Par: 70
- Tour: PGA Tour
- Format: Stroke play
- Prize fund: US$57,000
- Month played: June
- Final year: 2001

Tournament record score
- Aggregate: 266 Bobby Locke (1948)
- To par: −18 as above

Final champion
- (United States) Don Berry

Location map
- Location in the United States Location in Illinois

The Chicago Open was a golf tournament played in the Chicago area. A Chicago District Open was first held in 1914. From 1926 to 1928 it became a national event. It was held again from 1937 to 1941, although there was no event in 1939. The Hale America National Open Golf Tournament was held in Chicago in 1942 and the Chicago Victory Open was played from 1943 to 1948. It was revived again as the Gleneagles-Chicago Open Invitational in 1958 and 1959.

== History ==
The 1937 event was played at Medinah Country Club in Medinah, Illinois, from July 23 to 25 and was won by Gene Sarazen with a score of 290. Two courses, numbers 1 and 2, were used for the opening two rounds with the final 36 holes played on the number 3 course.

The 1938 event was played at Olympia Fields Country Club in Olympia Fields, Illinois, from July 22 to 24 and was won by Sam Snead with a score of 207, a stroke ahead of Ralph Guldahl. Two courses, numbers 1 and 4, were used for the opening two rounds. Heavy rain affected play on the opening day and the scores were canceled, reducing the event to 54 holes with a cut after 18 holes. The final 36 holes were played on the number 4 course.

The 1940 event was played at Tam O'Shanter Country Club in Niles, Illinois, from July 19 to 21 and was won by Dick Metz with a score of 278. Amateur Jim Ferrier led after the first round with a 66, while Johnny Revolta led after two rounds on 136. Revolta had round 74 and 69 on the final day while Metz scored 69 and 70. Ben Hogan had a final round 66 to tie Revolta for second place.

The 1941 events was played at Elmhurst Country Club in Addison, Illinois, from July 18 to 20. Ben Hogan led by three strokes form Dick Metz at the half-way stage after rounds of 66 and 70. Hogan scored two rounds of 69 on the final day and won by two strokes from Craig Wood, who had two rounds of 67. Metz finished in third place.

The event was revived as Gleneagles-Chicago Open Invitational after the World Championship of Golf was canceled. It was played at Gleneagles Country Club in Lemont, Illinois, in 1958 and 1959. The top prize money was $9,000. Ken Venturi won both events.

== Winners ==
| Year | Tour (Note: PGAT − PGA Tour.) | Winner | Score | To par | Margin of victory | Runner(s)-up | Winner's share ($) | Ref. |
LaSalle Bank Chicago Open
| 2001 | | (United States) Don Berry | | | | | | |
| 2000 | | (England) Luke Donald (a) | 205 | −8 | 6 strokes | | | |
| 1999 | | (United States) Bob Ackerman | | | | | | |
| 1998 | | (United States) Scott Hebert | | | | | | |
1960–1997: No tournament
Gleneagles-Chicago Open Invitational
| 1959 | PGAT | (United States) Ken Venturi (2) | 273 | −7 | 1 stroke | (United States) Johnny Pott | 9,000 | |
| 1958 | PGAT | (United States) Ken Venturi | 272 | −8 | 1 stroke | (United States) Julius Boros (United States) Jack Burke Jr. | 9,000 | |
1949–1957: No tournament
Chicago Victory National Open
| 1948 | PGAT | (South Africa) Bobby Locke | 266 | −18 | 16 strokes | (United States) Ellsworth Vines | 2,000 | |
| 1947 | PGAT | (United States) Ben Hogan (2) | 270 | −14 | 4 strokes | (United States) Sam Snead | 2,000 | |
| 1946 | PGAT | (United States) Byron Nelson (2) | 279 | −5 | 2 strokes | (United States) Jug McSpaden | 2,000 | |
| 1945 | PGAT | (United States) Byron Nelson | 275 | −13 | 7 strokes | (United States) Ky Laffoon (United States) Jug McSpaden | 2,000 | |
| 1944 | PGAT | (United States) Jug McSpaden | 273 | −11 | Playoff | (United States) Ben Hogan | 3,000 | |
| 1943 | PGAT | (United States) Sam Byrd | 277 | −7 | 5 strokes | (United States) Craig Wood | 1,000 | |
1942: No tournament
Chicago Open
| 1941 | PGAT | (United States) Ben Hogan | 274 | −10 | 2 strokes | (United States) Craig Wood | 1,200 | |
| 1940 | PGAT | (United States) Dick Metz | 278 | −10 | 1 stroke | (United States) Ben Hogan (United States) Johnny Revolta | 1,500 | |
1939: No tournament
| 1938 | PGAT | (United States) Sam Snead | 207 | −3 | 1 stroke | (United States) Ralph Guldahl | 1,500 | |
| 1937 | PGAT | (United States) Gene Sarazen | 290 | +7 | 1 stroke | (England) Harry Cooper (United States) Ky Laffoon (United States) Horton Smith | 3,000 | |
1929–1936: No tournament
Chicago Open Championship
| 1928 | PGAT | (United States) Abe Espinosa | 283 | −5 | 1 stroke | (United States) Frank Walsh | 500 | |
| 1927 | PGAT | (United States) Johnny Farrell | 285 | +1 | 2 strokes | (United States) Al Espinosa | 1,000 | |
| 1926 | PGAT | (Scotland) Macdonald Smith | 277 | −3 | 1 stroke | (United States) Eddie Loos | 1,000 | |

A Chicago District Open Championship was held in some years between 1914 and 1925. Winners include:

- 1925 Al Espinosa
- 1915 unknown
- 1914 Robert Gardner (a)
