= Belmont International Open =

Golf tournament

The Belmont International Open was a match-play golf tournament played at Belmont Country Club in Belmont, Massachusetts from September 22 to 28, 1937. Prize money was $12,000.

There was a 36-hole stroke-play stage played on September 22 and 23 after which the leading 64 players advanced to the match-play stage. Tony Manero led the stroke-play with a score of 140. 14 players on 153 had a playoff for 9 remaining places. Two 18-hole rounds were played on September 24 which reduced the field to 16. There were then four 36-hole rounds from September 25 to 28. Byron Nelson beat Henry Picard 5&4 in the final, taking the first prize of $3,000. The beaten semi-finalists were Harry Cooper and Ralph Guldahl.

== Winners ==
Year	Player	Country	Margin of victory	Runner-up	Winner's share ($)	Ref
1937	Byron Nelson	United States	5 & 4	(United States) Henry Picard	3,000	
