= Thomasville Open (PGA Tour) =

Golf tournament formerly on the PGA Tour

Tournament information
- Location: Thomasville, Georgia, U.S.
- Established: 1936
- Course: Glen Arven County Club
- Par: 72
- Tour: PGA Tour
- Format: Stroke play
- Prize fund: $3,000
- Final year: 1941

Tournament record score
- Aggregate: 280 Byron Nelson (1938) (72-hole); 203 Lloyd Mangrum (1940) (54-hole)
- To par: −8 Byron Nelson (1938) (72-hole) −13 Lloyd Mangrum (1940) (54-hole)

Final champion
- (United States) Harold "Jug" McSpaden

The Thomasville Open was a golf tournament on the PGA Tour from 1936 to 1941. It was held at the Glen Arven Country Club in Thomasville, Georgia. The purse each year was $3,000 with a winner's share of $700. From 1936 to 1938 it was a 72-hole event and from 1939 to 1941 it was a 54-hole tournament.

== Winners ==
Year	Date	Winner	Country	Score	To par	Ref
1941	Feb 23	Harold "Jug" McSpaden	United States	207	−9	
1940	Mar 11	Lloyd Mangrum	United States	203	−13	
1939	Feb 26	Henry Picard	United States	211	−5	
1938	Feb 27	Byron Nelson	United States	280	−8	
1937	Feb 22	Dick Metz	United States	284	−4	
1936	Feb 16	Johnny Revolta	United States	283	−5	

== See also ==
- Thomasville Open – a 1952 LPGA Tour event
