= 1945 PGA Championship =

Coordinates: 39.690°N 84.196°W

Tournament information
- Dates: July 9–15, 1945
- Location: Kettering, Ohio
- Course: Moraine Country Club
- Organized by: PGA of America
- Tour: PGA Tour
- Format: Match play - 5 rounds

Statistics
- Par: 72
- Field: 143 players, 32 to match play
- Cut: 148 (+6), playoff
- Prize fund: $14,700
- Winner's share: $5,000 in war bonds

Champion
- (United States) Byron Nelson
- def. Sam Byrd, 4 and 3

Location in the United States
Location in Ohio

The 1945 PGA Championship was the 27th PGA Championship, held July 9–15 at Moraine Country Club in Kettering, Ohio, a suburb south of Dayton. Then a match play championship, Byron Nelson won 4 and 3 in the final over Sam Byrd, a former major league baseball player.

It was Nelson's fifth and final major title and his second win at the PGA Championship; he also won in 1940 and was a runner-up three times (1939, 1941, 1944). The winner's share of the purse was $5,000 in war bonds. The victory was the ninth of Nelson's record eleven consecutive wins in 1945.

Defending champion Bob Hamilton was defeated in the first round by Jack Grout, 4 and 3.

Due to World War II, the PGA Championship was the sole major played in 1945 (and 1944). The three others returned in 1946.

== Format ==
The match play format at the PGA Championship in 1945 called for 12 rounds (216 holes) in seven days:

- Monday and Tuesday – 36-hole stroke play qualifier, 18 holes per day, field of 78 players;
  - defending champion Bob Hamilton and top 31 professionals advanced to match play
- Wednesday – first round – 36 holes
- Thursday – second round – 36 holes
- Friday – quarterfinals – 36 holes
- Saturday – semifinals – 36 holes
- Sunday – final – 36 holes

== Final results ==
Sunday, July 15, 1945

Place	Player	Country
1	(United States) Byron Nelson	
2	(United States) Sam Byrd	
T3	(United States) Clarence Doser	
T3	(United States) Claude Harmon	
T5	(United States) Vic Ghezzi	
T5	(United States) Ralph Hutchison	
T5	(United States) Ky Laffoon	
T5	(United States) Denny Shute	

== Final eight bracket ==
Quarter-finals; July 13
Byron Nelson	3&2
Denny Shute
Claude Harmon	4&3
Ralph Hutchison
Sam Byrd	7&6
Vic Ghezzi
Clarence Doser	2&1
Ky Laffoon

Semi-finals; July 14
Byron Nelson	5&4
Claude Harmon
Sam Byrd	7&6
Clarence Doser

Finals; July 15
Byron Nelson	4&3
Sam Byrd

== Final match scorecards ==
Morning

Hole	1	2	3	4	5	6	7	8	9	10	11	12	13	14	15	16	17	18
Par	4	3	4	5	3	4	4	5	4	4	4	3	5	4	3	4	5	4
(United States) Nelson	3	4	3	5	3	4	3	6	4	4	3	3	5	4	3	3	5	4
(United States) Byrd	4	3	4	5	3	4	3	6	3	4	4	3	5	4	2	3	4	3
Leader	N1	–	N1	N1	N1	N1	N1	N1	–	–	N1	N1	N1	N1	–	–	B1	B2

Afternoon

Hole	1	2	3	4	5	6	7	8	9	10	11	12	13	14	15	16	17	18
Par	4	3	4	5	3	4	4	5	4	4	4	3	5	4	3	4	5	4
(United States) Nelson	4	3	4	4	3	4	4	5	4	4	3	3	4	4	3	Nelson wins 4 and 3		
(United States) Byrd	4	3	3	5	3	4	5	6	4	4	4	4	5	5	3	Nelson wins 4 and 3		
Leader	B2	B2	B3	B2	B2	B2	B1	–	–	–	N1	N2	N3	N4	N4	Nelson wins 4 and 3		

Birdie	Bogey
