= True Temper Sports =

American sports equipment manufacturer

True Temper Sports is a manufacturer of sports equipment headquartered in Memphis, Tennessee. They sell equipment for golf, ice hockey and lacrosse.

== History ==
The Old Stone Forge of Wallingford, Vermont, founded in 1808, became the American Fork and Hoe Co. In 1949, the name was changed to True Temper. In 1981 True Temper is divided into two divisions, sports and hardware. In 1990 they were bought by Huffy. In 1999, Ames acquired True Temper yard tools and golf shafts from Huffy. In 2009, True Temper Sports filed for Chapter 11 bankruptcy protection, citing a decline in golf sales. Lincolnshire Management acquired True Temper Sports in August 2012. In September 2025, Roustan Capital acquired True Hockey from Lincolnshire Management , relocating operations to Canada.

== Bicycle tubing ==
True Temper was well known for making bicycle tubing. These were made from at least 1987 until 2017. In 2016 True Temper announced they would stop making bicycle tubing in 2017.
