= Bob Hamilton =

American professional golfer (1916–1990)

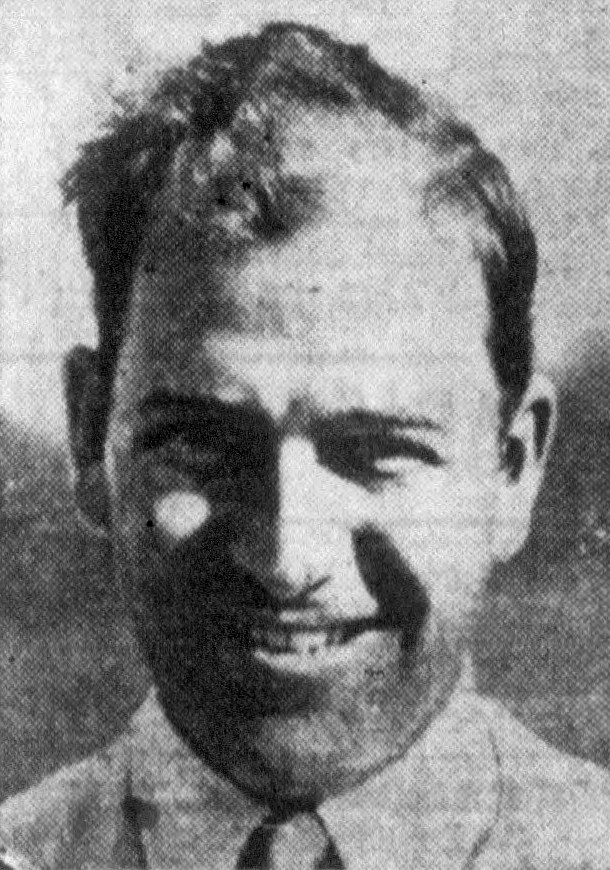
- Hamilton, circa 1949

Personal information
- Full name: Robert T. Hamilton
- Nationality: United States
- Born: January 10, 1916 Evansville, Indiana, U.S.
- Died: December 6, 1990 (aged 74) Evansville, Indiana, U.S.

Career
- Sport: Golf
- Status: Professional
- Former tour: PGA Tour
- Professional wins: 10

Number of wins by tour
- PGA Tour: 3
- Other: 7

Best results in major championships (wins: 1)
- Masters Tournament: 3rd: 1946
- PGA Championship: Won: 1944
- U.S. Open: T29: 1947
- The Open Championship: DNP

Robert T. Hamilton (January 10, 1916 – December 6, 1990) was an American professional golfer.

== Career ==
He was born and raised in Evansville, Indiana. He attended and graduated from Evansville Reitz High School in 1934.

Hamilton won ten professional titles, including one major, the PGA Championship in 1944 at Manito Golf and Country Club in Spokane, Washington. Then a match play event, he defeated heavily favored Byron Nelson in the finals, 1 up. Hamilton was a three-time winner of the Indiana Open, winning in 1938, 1942, and 1966. He won five times on the PGA Tour, including the 1948 New Orleans Open, one stroke ahead of runner-up Roberto De Vicenzo. Hamilton was also a member of the 1949 Ryder Cup team.

Hamilton also served as the golf pro at Fort Lewis, south of Seattle, during the latter stages of World War II; he was also a member of the Warriors, the inter-base (intramural) team. Individually, he placed 3rd in the Pacific Northwest Servicemen's Championship (Seattle) and 3rd in the Tacoma Open, a PGA Tour event.

Hamilton finished second to Sam Snead in the 1967 Senior PGA Championship at PGA National Golf Club in Palm Beach Gardens, Florida.

In 1975, Hamilton set the overall record for youngest golfer to shoot his age when he shot a 59 at Hamilton Golf Club in Evansville.

In 1990, Hamilton died in his hometown of Evansville, Indiana.

== Awards and honors ==
In 1965, Hamilton was inducted into the Indiana Golf Hall of Fame.

== Amateur wins ==
This list may be incomplete

- 1934 IHSAA State Champion
- 1936 Indiana Amateur

== Professional wins (10) ==
=== PGA Tour wins (3) ===
Legend
Major championships (1)
Other PGA Tour (4)

No.	Date	Tournament	Winning score	Margin of victory	Runner(s)-up
1	Aug 15, 1944	PGA Championship	1 up		(United States) Byron Nelson
2	Mar 31, 1946	Charlotte Open	−15 (70-71-67-65=273)	3 strokes	(United States) Pete Cooper, (United States) Jimmy Demaret, (United States) Sam Snead
3	Feb 22, 1948	New Orleans Open	−4 (70-71-70-69=280)	1 stroke	(Argentina) Roberto De Vicenzo, (United States) Fred Haas, (United States) Lawson Little

PGA Tour playoff record (0–1)

No.	Year	Tournament	Opponent	Result
1	1949	Miami Open	(United States) Fred Haas	Lost 18-hole playoff; Haas: −1 (69), Hamilton: +1 (71)

=== Other wins (7) ===
This list may be incomplete

- 1938 Indiana Open
- 1942 Indiana Open
- 1943 Indiana PGA Championship
- 1944 Indiana PGA Championship, North and South Open
- 1949 Inverness Invitational Four-Ball (with Chick Harbert)
- 1966 Indiana Open

== Major championships ==
=== Wins (1) ===
Year	Championship	Winning score	Runner-up
1944	PGA Championship	1 up	(United States) Byron Nelson

Note: The PGA Championship was match play until 1958

=== Results timeline ===
Tournament	1941	1942	1943	1944	1945	1946	1947	1948	1949
Masters Tournament			NT	NT	NT	3	T42	T18	T23
U.S. Open	T45	NT	NT	NT	NT		T29		CUT
PGA Championship			NT	1	R32	R32	R64	R64	R32

Tournament	1950	1951	1952	1953	1954	1955	1956	1957	1958	1959
Masters Tournament	T32		T40	4				WD		
U.S. Open		T42								
PGA Championship	R64	R32	SF							

Tournament	1960	1961	1962	1963	1964	1965	1966	1967	1968
Masters Tournament									
U.S. Open									
PGA Championship							WD		T59

Note: Hamilton never played in The Open Championship.

Win
Top 10
Did not play

NT = no tournament
WD = withdrew
CUT = missed the half-way cut
R64, R32, R16, QF, SF = round in which player lost in PGA Championship match play
"T" indicates a tie for a place

=== Summary ===
Tournament	Wins	2nd	3rd	Top-5	Top-10	Top-25	Events	Cuts made
Masters Tournament	0	0	1	2	2	4	8	7
U.S. Open	0	0	0	0	0	0	4	3
The Open Championship	0	0	0	0	0	0	0	0
PGA Championship	1	0	1	2	2	6	11	10
Totals	1	0	2	4	4	10	23	20

- Most consecutive cuts made – 11 (1941 U.S. Open – 1949 Masters)
- Longest streak of top-10s – 2 (1952 PGA – 1953 Masters)

== See also ==
- Chronological list of men's major golf champions
- List of men's major championships winning golfers
