= Miami Open (golf) =

Golf tournament formerly on the PGA Tour

The Miami Open was a golf tournament on the PGA Tour from 1924 to 1955. It was played at what is now the Miami Springs Golf & Country Club in Miami, Florida. The event was played in December from 1924 to 1926 and from 1937 to 1955. It was played in early January from 1928 to 1937.

== Winners ==
- 1955 Sam Snead (reduced to 54 holes by bad weather)
- 1954 Bob Rosburg
- 1953 Doug Ford
- 1952 Jack Burke Jr.
- 1951 Sam Snead
- 1950 Sam Snead
- 1949 Fred Haas
- 1948 Frank Stranahan (amateur)
- 1947 Jimmy Demaret
- 1946 Sam Snead
- 1945 Henry Picard
- 1944 Dutch Harrison
- 1943 Steve Warga
- 1942 Harold "Jug" McSpaden (unofficial win)
- 1941 Byron Nelson
- 1940 Byron Nelson
- 1939 Sam Snead
- 1938 Harold "Jug" McSpaden
- 1937 (Dec.) Sam Snead
- 1937 (Jan.) Ray Mangrum
- 1936 Willie Klein
- 1935 Tommy Armour
- 1934 Ralph Stonehouse
- 1933 Johnny Revolta
- 1932 Tommy Armour
- 1931 Joe Turnesa
- 1930 Gene Sarazen
- 1929 Gene Sarazen
- 1928 Gene Sarazen
- 1927 No tournament – switched from December to January
- 1926 Gene Sarazen
- 1925 Willie Klein
- 1924 Abe Mitchell
