= Philadelphia Country Club =

Country club in Gladwyne, Pennsylvania

Coordinates: 40°03′49″N 75°17′30″W

- New Wing ca. 1899
- Interactive map of Philadelphia Country Club

Club information
- Location: Gladwyne, PA; Lower Merion Township; Montgomery County, Pennsylvania
- Established: 1890
- Type: Private
- Total holes: 27
- Tournaments: 1899 U.S. Women's Championship; 1939 U.S. Open; 2003 U.S. Women's Amateur; 2005 U.S. Men's Amateur (co-host)
- Website: Philadelphia Country Club

Spring Mill course
- Designed by: William S. Flynn
- Par: 71
- Length: 6,976 yards
- Course rating: 73.9
- Slope rating: 135

Centennial Nine
- Designed by: Tom Fazio
- Par: 35
- Length: 3,312

Philadelphia Country Club is a private country club located in the Gladwyne suburb of Lower Merion Township, Montgomery County, Pennsylvania. It has 27 holes of regulation golf including one 18-hole championship course, a nine-hole course, an Olympic-sized and baby pool, shooting lodge and range, squash facility, tennis, and paddle courts, a bowling alley, and a 100,000-foot clubhouse that includes four dining rooms, a terrace for outdoor seating during the warmer months and ballroom for weddings and bar and bat mitzvahs.

The heart of the club is the clubhouse, which includes four dining rooms and an outside terrace during warmer weather. There is also a ballroom that can accommodate up to 400 people, and numerous multi-purpose rooms that can be used for parties or meeting rooms. The clubhouse includes a fitness center, golf pro shop, and multiple locker rooms.

Philadelphia Country Club was one of the first six members of the USGA, and the golf course hosted the U.S. Open in 1939. It also hosted the 1899 U.S. Women's Championship and the 2003 U.S. Women's Amateur and co-hosted the 2005 Men's Amateur. Golf includes an 18-hole golf course, as well as a nine-hole golf course added in 1990 to celebrate the club's one hundredth anniversary. The 18-hole championship golf course is known as the Spring Mill Course and the 9-hole golf course is called Centennial.

The club has three practice areas. 1) The main practice area features a driving range, putting green and separate short game chipping area. 2)The second practice area features a practice hole and practice putting green. 3) In 2021, the Philadelphia Country Club opened a new full length driving range and training center.

There are four other buildings at Philadelphia Country Club. One is a squash building that includes singles and doubles courts, viewing areas along with a party space and a pro shop. Philadelphia Country Club has hosted multiple U.S. Open Squash tournaments, including one as late as 2013 with another planned for 2015. The squash building includes four bowling alleys and a party area. Another building is the "summer house" that includes the snack bar, drink bar and dining area for the pool, along with a tennis and paddle hut on the other side of the building that includes a pro shop and lounge. The view from the summer house is aligned along the side of the fairway of the 18th hole of the Spring Mill course. There is also a shooting lodge for both trap and skeet shooting. The shooting lodge includes a large stone fireplace, a bar and party area. The club's grounds maintenance facility was renovated from the old clubhouse.

== Scorecard ==
Spring Mill Course
| Tee | Rating/Slope | 1 | 2 | 3 | 4 | 5 | 6 | 7 | 8 | 9 | Out | 10 | 11 | 12 | 13 | 14 | 15 | 16 | 17 | 18 | In | Total |
| Black | M: 75.1/142 | 353 | 432 | 601 | 479 | 181 | 500 | 207 | 388 | 418 | 3559 | 437 | 193 | 619 | 405 | 495 | 228 | 403 | 434 | 450 | 3664 | 7223 |
| Blue | M: 73.6/132 | 313 | 341 | 559 | 455 | 167 | 491 | 195 | 380 | 404 | 3305 | 417 | 181 | 542 | 365 | 436 | 214 | 391 | 444 | 381 | 3371 | 6676 |
| White | M: 72.1/130 L: 77.8/144 | 302 | 320 | 526 | 439 | 155 | 462 | 180 | 368 | 391 | 3143 | 393 | 170 | 508 | 349 | 420 | 200 | 374 | 435 | 369 | 3218 | 6361 |
| Par | Men's | 4 | 4 | 5 | 4 | 3 | 5 | 3 | 4 | 4 | 36 | 4 | 3 | 5 | 4 | 4 | 3 | 4 | 4 | 4 | 35 | 71 |
| SI | Men's | 17 | 9 | 3 | 1 | 15 | 7 | 13 | 11 | 5 | | 10 | 18 | 6 | 8 | 2 | 16 | 12 | 4 | 14 |
| SI | Ladies' | 17 | 5 | 3 | 11 | 13 | 1 | 15 | 7 | 9 | | 10 | 18 | 4 | 2 | 12 | 14 | 8 | 6 | 16 |
| Par | Ladies' | 4 | 4 | 5 | 5 | 3 | 5 | 3 | 4 | 4 | 37 | 5 | 3 | 5 | 4 | 4 | 3 | 4 | 5 | 4 | 37 | 74 |
| Green | M: 69.3/128 L: 74.9/135 | 276 | 288 | 473 | 378 | 133 | 445 | 135 | 339 | 361 | 2828 | 382 | 162 | 454 | 315 | 369 | 190 | 339 | 425 | 307 | 2943 | 5771 |
| Gold | M: 67.0/125 L: 72.0/130 | 263 | 244 | 435 | 375 | 128 | 376 | 130 | 335 | 356 | 2642 | 340 | 157 | 441 | 315 | 318 | 180 | 336 | 342 | 300 | 2729 | 5371 |

Centennial Nine Course
| Tee | Rating/Slope | 1 | 2 | 3 | 4 | 5 | 6 | 7 | 8 | 9 | Total |
| Black | | 420 | 415 | 400 | 517 | 190 | 385 | 395 | 225 | 400 | 3347 |
| Blue | | 412 | 400 | 392 | 497 | 155 | 375 | 387 | 217 | 396 | 3231 |
| White | | 390 | 380 | 375 | 465 | 135 | 365 | 370 | 205 | 380 | 3065 |
| Par | Men's | 4 | 4 | 4 | 5 | 3 | 4 | 4 | 3 | 4 | 35 |
| SI | Men's | 4 | 2 | 7 | 1 | 9 | 8 | 6 | 5 | 3 |
| SI | Women's | 4 | 2 | 5 | 1 | 9 | 8 | 7 | 3 | 6 |
| Par | Women's | 4 | 4 | 4 | 5 | 3 | 4 | 4 | 3 | 4 | 35 |
| Green | | 375 | 345 | 350 | 420 | 120 | 335 | 310 | 175 | 340 | 2770 |
| Gold | | 330 | 320 | 310 | 400 | 115 | 265 | 305 | 170 | 275 | 2490 |
