= Toney Penna =

Italian American professional golfer

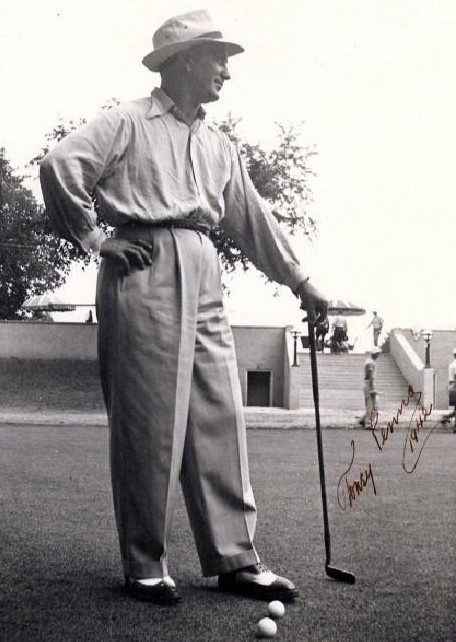
- Penna in 1942

Personal information
- Full name: Toney G. Penna
- Nationality: Italy; United States
- Born: January 15, 1908 Naples, Italy
- Died: August 6, 1995 (aged 87) Palm Beach Gardens, Florida, U.S.

Career
- Sport: Golf
- Status: Professional
- Former tour: PGA Tour
- Professional wins: 5

Number of wins by tour
- PGA Tour: 4
- Other: 1

Best results in major championships
- Masters Tournament: T8: 1947
- PGA Championship: T9: 1944, 1945
- U.S. Open: T3: 1938
- The Open Championship: CUT: 1954

Toney G. Penna (January 15, 1908 – August 6, 1995) was an Italian-American professional golfer and designer of golf clubs and gear. He won four events on the PGA Tour between 1937 and 1947. He introduced new lines of golf clubs and was the holder of four patents for golf clubs. Many of these clubs are considered collector's items: some are still in production. He also introduced the use of color to both clubs and to golf accessories, such as carrying bags.

== Biography ==
Penna was born in Naples, Italy. He grew up in Harrison, New York and also lived in Dayton and Cincinnati, Ohio. By 1946, Penna had moved to Delray Beach, Florida.

Starting out in golf by being a caddy, Penna was known for his personality and individualism as much as for his golfing abilities. He was often a critic of his high-ranking golf contemporaries, and published a table illustrating his thoughts about the strengths and weaknesses of each in his autobiography. With a ready temper but also a sense of humor, Penna's work as a golf pro brought him into contact with Dean Martin, Bing Crosby, and Bob Hope, among others.

Perry Como was a long-time friend of Penna's. Before his permanent move to Florida, Como often came to golf with him on the weekends after completing his weekly television program. After a tournament where Penna beat Como, he remarked that the only thing that was keeping him from returning to the large professional golf tours was his lack of hair. A week later, Penna received a package from Como; inside was a hairpiece and a note which said "Go!".

Penna was a longtime employee and representative of the MacGregor Golf Company. After years of working for MacGregor, Penna started his own company and manufactured his own golf clubs. A stretch of road in Jupiter, Florida, where his company was located is named after him. Penna used the spelling of his name as an attention-getter, and was known for having a taste for fine clothing. Penna displayed an ability for concentrated problem-solving in improving golf club performance which led to his success as an equipment representative, a golf pro, and also as the producer of his own line of golf clubs.

With his brother, Charley, Penna was associated with the Beverly and with the Calumet Country Clubs, both near Chicago; at one time both brothers were playing professionally. Penna died in Palm Beach Gardens, Florida in 1995 at the age of 87.

== Professional wins ==
=== PGA Tour wins (4) ===
- 1937 Pennsylvania Open Championship
- 1938 Kansas City Open
- 1946 Richmond Open
- 1947 Atlanta Open

=== Other wins ===
this list is incomplete

- 1948 North and South Open

== Results in major championships ==
Tournament	1934	1935	1936	1937	1938	1939
Masters Tournament					T31	T10
U.S. Open	T55		CUT	T28	T3	CUT
The Open Championship						
PGA Championship						

Tournament	1940	1941	1942	1943	1944	1945	1946	1947	1948	1949
Masters Tournament	T10	T19	22	NT	NT	NT	T21	T8	46	T23
U.S. Open	42	T33	NT	NT	NT	NT	T15	T31	T8	CUT
The Open Championship	NT	NT	NT	NT	NT	NT				
PGA Championship	R64	R32	R32	NT	R16	R16	R32	R32	R64	

Tournament	1950	1951	1952	1953	1954
Masters Tournament	T21	WD			
U.S. Open					CUT
The Open Championship					CUT
PGA Championship	R64	R32			R64

Top 10
Did not play

NT = no tournament
WD = withdrew
CUT = missed the half-way cut
R64, R32, R16, QF, SF = round in which player lost in PGA Championship match play
"T" indicates a tie for a place

=== Summary ===
Tournament	Wins	2nd	3rd	Top-5	Top-10	Top-25	Events	Cuts made
Masters Tournament	0	0	0	0	3	8	11	10
U.S. Open	0	0	1	1	2	3	12	8
The Open Championship	0	0	0	0	0	0	1	0
PGA Championship	0	0	0	0	2	7	11	11
Totals	0	0	1	1	7	18	35	29

- Most consecutive cuts made – 20 (1940 Masters – 1949 Masters)
- Longest streak of top-10s – 2 (twice)
