= Herman Barron =

American professional golfer (1909–1978)

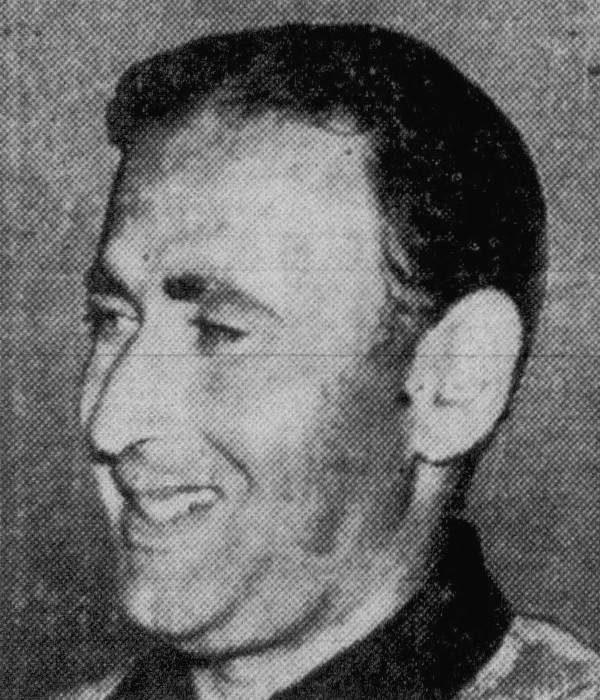

Personal information
- Nationality: United States
- Born: December 23, 1909 Port Chester, New York, U.S.
- Died: June 11, 1978 (aged 68) Pompano Beach, Florida, U.S.

Career
- Sport: Golf
- Status: Professional
- Former tour: PGA Tour
- Professional wins: 14

Number of wins by tour
- PGA Tour: 4
- Other: 8 (regular); 2 (senior)

Best results in major championships
- Masters Tournament: T13: 1949
- PGA Championship: T5: 1932
- U.S. Open: T4: 1946
- The Open Championship: CUT: 1963

Herman Barron (December 23, 1909 – June 11, 1978) was an American professional golfer, best known for being the first Jewish golfer to win a PGA Tour event.

== Early life ==
Barron was born in Port Chester, New York.

== Professional career ==
Barron was one of barely a dozen professional golfers who earned their living as touring professionals in the 1930s and 1940s. His first professional win came at the 1934 Philadelphia Open Championship. On February 8, 1942, Barron became the first Jewish golfer to win an official PGA Tour event by winning the Western Open by two strokes over Henry Picard at Phoenix Golf Club in Phoenix, Arizona.

Barron was consistently among the Tour's top money winners. His best year came in 1946. In June he won the Philadelphia Inquirer Open, finished tied for fourth in the U.S. Open the following week, and in late July won the All American Open at the Tam O'Shanter Golf Course in Chicago.

Barron played on America's victorious 1947 Ryder Cup team, but was soon forced into retiring as a touring professional due to failing health. For the next 15 years, he held the position of teaching pro at the Fenway Golf Club in Westchester County, New York.

Barron returned to the touring circuit in the early 1960s and won the 1963 Senior PGA Championship. He also worked as a teaching pro during this era. Barron also played a large role in the development of Israel's first golf course, in Caesarea.

== Personal life ==
In 1978, Barron died in Pompano Beach, Florida, at the age of 68.

== Awards and honors ==
- Barron is enshrined in the Westchester Hall of Fame
- He was inducted into the PGA Metropolitan Section Hall of Fame in New York
- Barron was inducted into the International Jewish Sports Hall of Fame.

== Professional wins (14) ==
=== PGA Tour wins (4) ===
| No. | Date | Tournament | Winning score | Margin of victory | Runner-up | Ref |
|---|---|---|---|---|---|---|
| 1 | Feb 8, 1942 | Western Open | −8 (69-69-71-67=276) | 2 strokes | (United States) Henry Picard | |
| 2 | Jun 10, 1946 | Philadelphia Inquirer Open | −3 (72-68-68-69=277) | Playoff | (United States) Lew Worsham | |
| 3 | Jul 28, 1946 | All American Open | −8 (68-71-69-72=280) | 1 stroke | (United States) Ellsworth Vines | |
| 4 | May 9, 1948 | Goodall Round Robin | +38 points | 6 points | (South Africa) Bobby Locke | |

=== Other wins (8) ===
- 1934 Philadelphia Open Championship
- 1937 Metropolitan PGA
- 1938 Westchester PGA Championship
- 1941 Westchester PGA Championship
- 1943 Westchester PGA Championship
- 1951 Westchester PGA Championship
- 1954 Westchester Open
- 1955 Westchester PGA Championship

=== Senior wins (2) ===
| No. | Date | Tournament | Winning score | Margin of victory | Runner-up |
|---|---|---|---|---|---|
| 1 | Feb 3, 1963 | PGA Seniors' Championship | −16 (67-67-69-69=272) | 2 strokes | (United States) John Barnum |
| 2 | Jul 7, 1963 | World Senior Championship | 3 & 2 | | (England) George Evans |

== Results in major championships ==
| Tournament | 1929 | 1930 | 1931 | 1932 | 1933 | 1934 | 1935 | 1936 | 1937 | 1938 | 1939 |
|---|---|---|---|---|---|---|---|---|---|---|---|
| Masters Tournament | NYF | NYF | NYF | NYF | NYF | WD | | WD | WD | | |
| U.S. Open | | T28 | T15 | T31 | T13 | T23 | T14 | T11 | CUT | CUT | |
| The Open Championship | | | | | | | | | | | |
| PGA Championship | R16 | | | QF | | R32 | R64 | R64 | R64 | | R32 |

| Tournament | 1940 | 1941 | 1942 | 1943 | 1944 | 1945 | 1946 | 1947 | 1948 | 1949 |
|---|---|---|---|---|---|---|---|---|---|---|
| Masters Tournament | | | T36 | NT | NT | NT | T25 | T17 | T25 | T13 |
| U.S. Open | | T5 | NT | NT | NT | NT | T4 | T27 | 7 | T27 |
| The Open Championship | NT | NT | NT | NT | NT | NT | | | | |
| PGA Championship | | | | NT | | R16 | R16 | R32 | | R16 |

| Tournament | 1950 | 1951 | 1952 | 1953 | 1954 | 1955 | 1956 | 1957 | 1958 | 1959 |
|---|---|---|---|---|---|---|---|---|---|---|
| Masters Tournament | T46 | | | | | | | | | |
| U.S. Open | CUT | CUT | CUT | | CUT | | | | T50 | CUT |
| The Open Championship | | | | | | | | | | |
| PGA Championship | | | | | | | | | T35 | CUT |

| Tournament | 1960 | 1961 | 1962 | 1963 |
|---|---|---|---|---|
| Masters Tournament | | | | |
| U.S. Open | | | | |
| The Open Championship | | | | CUT |
| PGA Championship | | CUT | | |

Top 10
Did not play

NYF = tournament not yet founded
NT = no tournament
WD = withdrew
CUT = missed the half-way cut (3rd round cut in 1959 PGA Championship)
R64, R32, R16, QF, SF = round in which player lost in PGA Championship match play
"T" indicates a tie for a place

== See also ==
- List of Jewish golfers
