= Dick Metz =

American professional golfer (1908–1993)

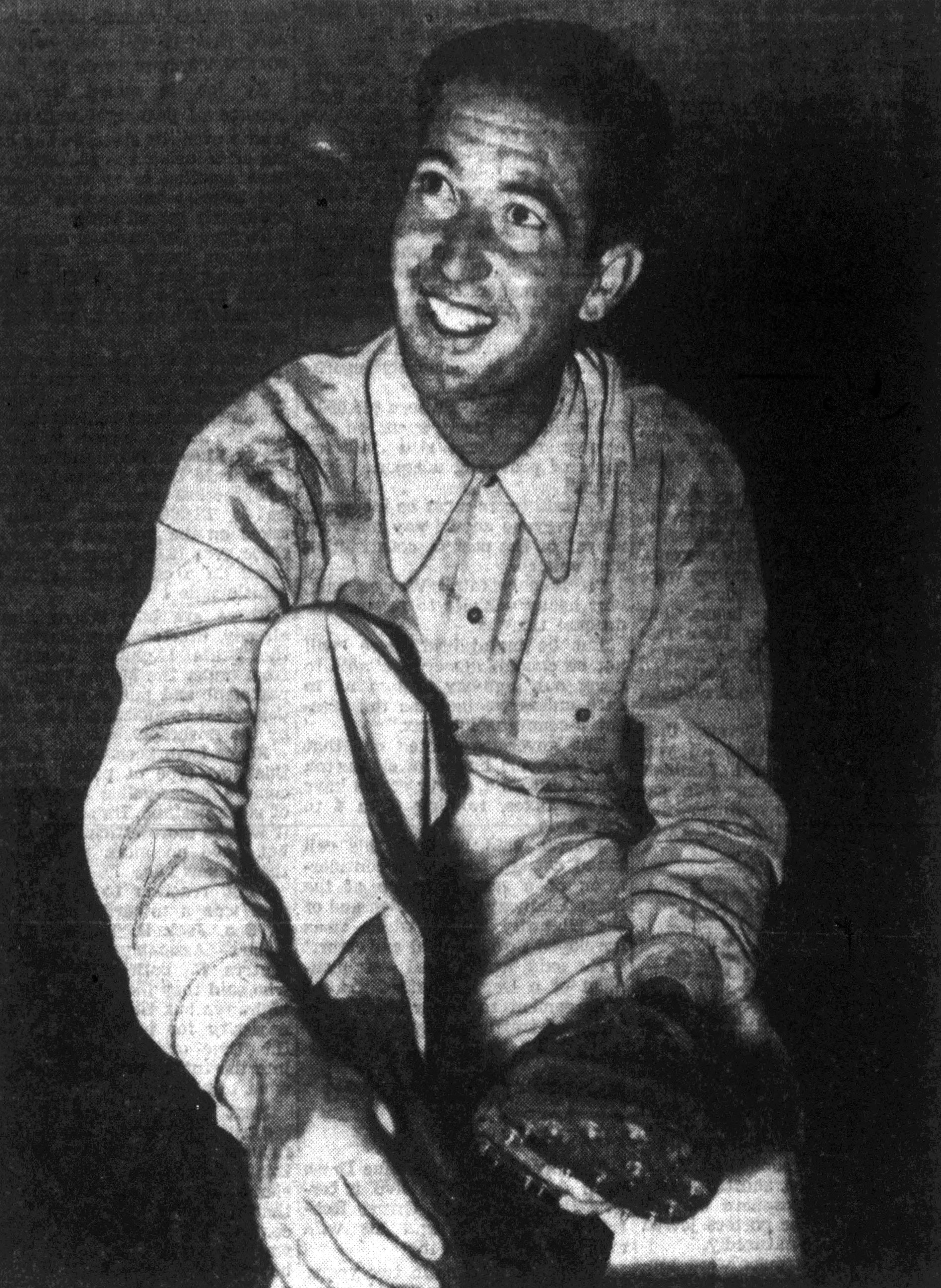
- Metz, circa 1947

Personal information
- Full name: Richard C. Metz
- Nationality: United States
- Born: May 29, 1908 Arkansas City, Kansas, U.S.
- Died: May 5, 1993 (aged 84) Arkansas City, Kansas, U.S.

Career
- Sport: Golf
- Turned professional: 1927
- Former tour: PGA Tour
- Professional wins: 14

Number of wins by tour
- PGA Tour: 8
- Other: 6

Best results in major championships
- Masters Tournament: T8: 1938, 1947
- PGA Championship: T3: 1939
- U.S. Open: 2nd: 1938
- The Open Championship: DNP

Richard C. Metz (May 29, 1908 – May 5, 1993) was an American professional golfer.

== Career ==
Metz won 10 times on the PGA Tour in the 1930s and 1940s. He had continued success as a senior golfer winning the Senior PGA Championship and World Seniors Championship in 1960.

Metz married actress Jean Chatburn on November 2, 1939. He was also a cattle rancher from the 1950s until his death. He was born and died in Arkansas City, Kansas.

== Professional wins (14) ==
=== PGA Tour wins (8) ===
- 1937 (2) Thomasville Open, Hollywood Open
- 1939 (4) Oakland Open, Asheville Open, St. Paul Open, San Francisco National Match Play Open
- 1940 (1) Chicago Open
- 1949 (1) Cedar Rapids Open

=== Other wins (6) ===
- 1933 Pennsylvania Open Championship
- 1935 Mid-South Pro-Pro Bestball (with Gene Kunes)
- 1938 Miami International Four-Ball (with Ky Laffoon)
- 1939 Illinois PGA Championship

=== Senior wins (2) ===
- 1960 PGA Seniors' Championship, World Senior Championship

== Results in major championships ==
Tournament	1933	1934	1935	1936	1937	1938	1939
Masters Tournament	NYF	WD	T31	27		T8	T31
U.S. Open		CUT	T10	T28		2	T7
PGA Championship	R32	QF	R32	R32		R16	SF

Tournament	1940	1941	1942	1943	1944	1945	1946	1947	1948	1949
Masters Tournament	T21	T19		NT	NT	NT	T32	T8	T10	T30
U.S. Open	9	T10	NT	NT	NT	NT	T8	T13	CUT	CUT
PGA Championship	R16	R64	R32	NT			R32	R16		

Tournament	1950	1951	1952	1953	1954	1955	1956	1957	1958	1959
Masters Tournament				T23						CUT
U.S. Open	T20		6	T7	T29				T7	CUT
PGA Championship	R32									

Note: Metz never played in The Open Championship.

Top 10
Did not play

NYF = tournament not yet founded
NT = no tournament
WD = withdrew
CUT = missed the half-way cut
R64, R32, R16, QF, SF = Round in which player lost in PGA Championship match play
"T" indicates a tie for a place

=== Summary ===
Tournament	Wins	2nd	3rd	Top-5	Top-10	Top-25	Events	Cuts made
Masters Tournament	0	0	0	0	3	6	13	11
U.S. Open	0	1	0	1	9	11	17	13
The Open Championship	0	0	0	0	0	0	0	0
PGA Championship	0	0	1	2	5	11	12	12
Totals	0	1	1	3	17	28	42	36

- Most consecutive cuts made – 27 (1934 PGA – 1948 Masters)
- Longest streak of top-10s – 3 (1938 Masters – 1938 PGA)
