= Jug McSpaden =

American professional golfer (1908–1996)

Harold "Jug" McSpaden
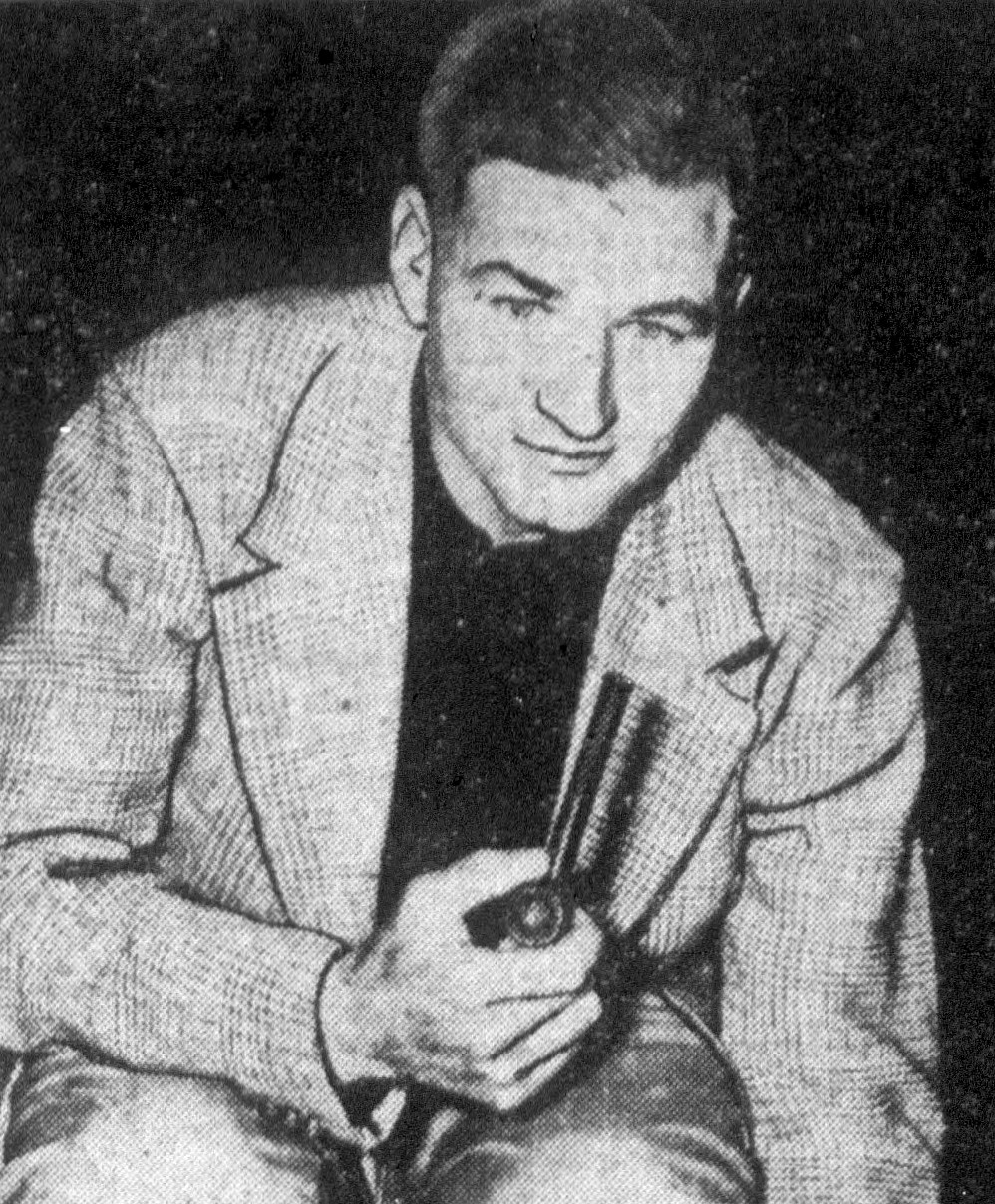
- McSpaden, circa 1943

Personal information
- Full name: Harold Lee McSpaden
- Nickname: Jug
- Nationality: United States
- Born: July 21, 1908 Monticello, Kansas, U.S.
- Died: April 22, 1996 (aged 87) Kansas City, Kansas, U.S.
- Spouses: Elizabeth Celeste "Betty" Proctor McSpaden (m.1949–1996)

Career
- Sport: Golf
- Turned professional: 1926
- Former tour: PGA Tour
- Professional wins: 28

Number of wins by tour
- PGA Tour: 17
- Other: 11

Best results in major championships
- Masters Tournament: T4: 1947
- PGA Championship: 2nd: 1937
- U.S. Open: T7: 1931
- The Open Championship: DNP

Harold Lee "Jug" McSpaden (July 21, 1908 – April 22, 1996) was an American professional golfer, and golf course architect.

== Career ==
Born in Monticello, Kansas, McSpaden became interested in golf at the age of ten, after seeing Harry Vardon play in Kansas City, Kansas. McSpaden worked as a caddie, then was elected to PGA Membership at age 18 on November 11, 1926. He played in the first Masters in 1934 and won the Pasadena Open in 1935; the Canadian Open in 1939; and both the Los Angeles Open and the Phoenix Open in 1944 (his only head-to-head win against Byron Nelson). In the late 1930s and early 40s McSpaden was the club pro at Winchester Country Club outside Boston.

In 1938, McSpaden played in the second Bing Crosby Pro-Am and was partnered with Eddie Lowery, who had been the caddy of Francis Ouimet in the 1913 U.S. Open.

McSpaden was named to the U.S. Ryder Cup team in 1939, but the event was cancelled that year due to the outbreak of World War II. Other members of the Ryder Cup team that year included: Byron Nelson, Ralph Guldahl, Paul Runyan, Dick Metz, Craig Wood, Horton Smith, Walter Hagen, Sam Snead, and honorary captain Vic Ghezzi. McSpaden was also a member of the Ryder Cup team in 1941, 1942, and 1943; but during those years only exhibition matches were played as fundraisers for the war effort. Between 1942 and 1944 McSpaden and Byron Nelson, both of whom were rejected from the military for health reasons, made 110 exhibition fundraising appearances for the Red Cross and USO.

Because of their consistent one-two finishes at these charity events, Nelson and McSpaden were together referred to as the "Gold Dust Twins". In 1944, when winners were paid in war bonds, McSpaden won $23,855. He claimed to have cleared less than $150 when he cashed them in. McSpaden's winnings that year were second only to Nelson's record-breaking $37,967 worth of bonds.

In 1938, McSpaden and Byron Nelson complained to and then worked with a shoe manufacturer, Field and Flint, to improve the comfort and grip of golf shoes. For a time, they each received a 25 cent royalty for each pair of shoes sold.

McSpaden and Nelson were the subject of "Iron Masters", a 1940s newsreel narrated by Bill Stern.

In 1947, McSpaden became vice president of a sportswear company, the Palm Beach Company, and left the professional golf tour; he did compete periodically in Tour events for some time after this.

He was the course architect for the Dub's Dread Golf Club in Kansas City, Kansas. He competed in the Senior PGA Championship until the age of 85.

While McSpaden had 17 PGA Tour wins in all, he holds a PGA record for coming in second: 13 times in one year, 1945. That same year, he set a PGA record of 31 top-10 finishes in one season. He finished 12 times in the top-10 at major championships. His best finish was runner-up to Denny Shute at the 1937 PGA Championship.

McSpaden was the first pro golfer to shoot a 59 on a par-71 course (Brackenridge Park Golf Club, San Antonio, Texas) in 1939. His playing partners that day were Byron Nelson, Paul Runyan, and Ben Hogan.

McSpaden also holds the PGA record for being the oldest golfer ever to better his age in a Champions Tour event: in 1994 he shot an 81 at the age of 85 in Palm Beach Gardens, Florida.

McSpaden was named the 1994 Nissan Open Tournament Honoree, having won the event in 1944. In 1995, McSpaden said to Byron Nelson, "If you wouldn't have been born, I'd have been known as a pretty good player."

According to Byron Nelson, McSpaden was "a better player than most people know". He was "honest, forthright, kind of rough and gruff", and because of his "exceptionally long arms" only used a 42-inch driver for most of his career.

== Death and legacy ==
In Kansas City, Kansas, on April 22, 1996, McSpaden and his wife Betty (b.1922, m.1949) were found dead in their home located on Painted Hills Golf Course, named Victory Hills at the time. Their car had been left running in the attached garage and the police ruled the deaths accidental carbon monoxide poisonings.

McSpaden was on the ballot for the World Golf Hall of Fame in 2004 and 2005, but did not receive enough support for induction.

Dub's Dread, the course McSpaden designed, was once listed in the Guinness Book of World Records as the world's longest golf course.

== Awards and honors ==
- In 1991, McSpaden was elected to the Professional Golfers' Association Hall of Fame.
- On September 30, 1991, he was inducted into the Kansas Golf Hall of Fame.

== Professional wins (28) ==
=== PGA Tour wins (17) ===
- 1933 (1) Santa Monica Amateur-Pro
- 1934 (1) Pasadena Open
- 1935 (2) Sacramento Open, San Francisco National Match Play Open
- 1936 (1) Massachusetts Open
- 1937 (1) Massachusetts Open
- 1938 (2) Miami Open, Houston Open
- 1939 (1) Canadian Open
- 1941 (1) Thomasville Open
- 1943 (1) All American Open
- 1944 (5) Los Angeles Open, Phoenix Open, Gulfport Open-Mississippi, Chicago Victory National Open, Golden Valley Four-Ball (with Byron Nelson)
- 1945 (1) Miami International Four-Ball (with Byron Nelson)

=== Other wins (11) ===
- 1931 Oklahoma Open
- 1934 Oklahoma Open, Iowa Open
- 1938 Massachusetts Open, New England PGA Championship
- 1939 New England PGA Championship
- 1940 Philippine Open
- 1941 Massachusetts Open, New England PGA Championship
- 1942 Miami Open
- 1944 Utah Open

== Results in major championships ==
Tournament	1928	1929
U.S. Open	CUT	
PGA Championship		

Tournament	1930	1931	1932	1933	1934	1935	1936	1937	1938	1939
Masters Tournament	NYF	NYF	NYF	NYF	T7	T19	T15	32	T16	T12
U.S. Open			T40	CUT		CUT	T18	T20	T16	T9
PGA Championship							QF	2	R32	R64

Tournament	1940	1941	1942	1943	1944	1945	1946	1947	1948	1949
Masters Tournament	T17	T9	T18	NT	NT	NT	T29	T4	33	WD
U.S. Open	T12	T7	NT	NT	NT	NT	T31		T12	
PGA Championship	SF	R16	R16	NT	QF	R32	SF	R64		

Note: McSpaden never played in The Open Championship.

Top 10
Did not play

NYF = tournament not yet founded
NT = no tournament
WD = withdrew
CUT = missed the half-way cut
R64, R32, R16, QF, SF = round in which player lost in PGA Championship match play
"T" indicates a tie for a place

=== Summary ===
Tournament	Wins	2nd	3rd	Top-5	Top-10	Top-25	Events	Cuts made
Masters Tournament	0	0	0	1	3	9	13	12
U.S. Open	0	0	0	0	2	7	12	9
The Open Championship	0	0	0	0	0	0	0	0
PGA Championship	0	1	2	5	7	9	11	11
Totals	0	1	2	6	12	25	36	32

- Most consecutive cuts made – 29 (1936 Masters – 1948 U.S. Open)
- Longest streak of top-10s – 4 (1940 PGA – 1941 PGA)

== Bibliographical links ==
- Echlin, Greg (1999). Sacred Records. Taylor Trade Publishing. ISBN 1-886110-74-3.
- Gibson, Nevin H. (1958). The Encyclopedia of Golf. A.S. Barnes & Company. ASIN B0012G99ZI.
- Grimsley, Will (1966). Golf: Its History, People & Events. Prentice-Hall. ASIN B0000CNL4M.
- McCord, Robert (2002). The Golf Book Of Days. Citadel Press. ISBN 0-8065-2308-5.
- Nelson, Byron (1993). How I Played the Game. Taylor Trade Publishing. ISBN 0-87833-819-5.
- Peper, George (1988). Golf in America: The First One Hundred Years. Harry N. Abrams. ISBN 0-8109-1032-2.
