= 1947 Masters Tournament =

Tournament information
- Dates: April 3–6, 1947
- Location: Augusta, Georgia; 33.503°N 82.020°W
- Course: Augusta National Golf Club
- Organized by: Augusta National Golf Club
- Tour: PGA Tour

Statistics
- Par: 72
- Length: 6,800 yards (6,220 m)
- Field: 58 players
- Cut: None
- Prize fund: $10,000
- Winner's share: $2,500

Champion
- (United States) Jimmy Demaret
- 281 (−7)

Location map
- Location in the United States Location in Georgia

The 1947 Masters Tournament was the 11th Masters Tournament, held April 3–6 at Augusta National Golf Club in Augusta, Georgia. The purse was $10,000 with a winner's share of $2,500.

Jimmy Demaret, the 1940 champion, was the co-leader after both the first and second rounds, and had a three-shot lead after 54 holes. He carded a 71 on Sunday and won by two strokes over Byron Nelson and amateur Frank Stranahan. Demaret joined Horton Smith and Nelson as two-time winners of the Masters. He was the first to score four sub-par rounds in the same Masters and later became the first three-time winner in 1950.

== Field ==
1. Masters champions

Jimmy Demaret (9,10,12), Herman Keiser (9), Byron Nelson (2,6,9,10,12), Henry Picard (6,10), Gene Sarazen (2,4,6), Horton Smith (9), Craig Wood (2)

- Ralph Guldahl (2) did not play.

2. U.S. Open champions

Billy Burke, Johnny Farrell, Bobby Jones (3,4,5), Lawson Little (3,5,9,10), Lloyd Mangrum (9,10)

3. U.S. Amateur champions

Dick Chapman (8,a)

4. British Open champions

Denny Shute (6), Sam Snead (6,9,10)

5. British Amateur champions

Charlie Yates (a)

6. PGA champions

Vic Ghezzi (9,10), Bob Hamilton (9), Ben Hogan (9,10,12), Johnny Revolta

7. Members of the U.S. 1947 Ryder Cup team

- Team not selected in time for inclusion.

8. Members of the U.S. 1947 Walker Cup team

George Hamer (a), Skee Riegel (a), Frank Stranahan (9,a)

- Ted Bishop (3,11,a), Fred Kammer (11,a), Smiley Quick (11,a), Willie Turnesa (3,5,a) and Bud Ward (3,a) did not play.

9. Top 24 players and ties from the 1946 Masters Tournament

Johnny Bulla (10), Jim Ferrier, Jim Foulis, Fred Haas, Chick Harbert (10), Claude Harmon (10), Chandler Harper (10), Clayton Heafner (10), Ky Laffoon, Cary Middlecoff (11), Toney Penna (10), George Schneiter, Felix Serafin

10. Top 24 players and ties from the 1946 U.S. Open

Herman Barron, Ed Furgol, Dutch Harrison, Steve Kovach, Gene Kunes, Dick Metz, Ed Oliver (12), Harry Todd, Lew Worsham

- Henry Ransom and Paul Runyan did not play.

11. 1946 U.S. Amateur quarter-finalists

Babe Lind (a), Robert Willits (a)

- Maurice McCarthy (8,a) and Robert Sweeny Jr. (5,a) did not play.

12. 1946 PGA Championship quarter-finalists

Charles Congdon, Jug McSpaden, Frank Moore, Jim Turnesa

13. One amateur, not already qualified, selected by a ballot of ex-U.S. Amateur champions

- Johnny Dawson (a) did not play

14. One professional, not already qualified, selected by a ballot of ex-U.S. Open champions

Ellsworth Vines

15. Two players, not already qualified, with the best scoring average in the winter part of the 1947 PGA Tour

Johnny Palmer, George Schoux

16 Winner of the 1947 Inter-service Invitational tournament

Joe MacDonald (a)

17 Home club professional

Ed Dudley

18. Extra invitations

George Fazio (winner of the 1946 Canadian Open), Bobby Locke

== Round summaries ==
=== First round ===
Thursday, April 3, 1947

Place	Player	Score	To par
T1	(United States) Jimmy Demaret	69	−3
T1	(United States) Byron Nelson	69	−3
T3	(United States) Johnny Bulla	70	−2
T3	(United States) Jim Ferrier	70	−2
T3	(United States) Fred Haas	70	−2
T3	(United States) Ed Oliver	70	−2
T3	(United States) Johnny Palmer	70	−2
T3	(United States) George Schneiter	70	−2
T3	(United States) Lew Worsham	70	−2
T10	(United States) Herman Barron	71	−1
T10	(United States) Chick Harbert	71	−1
T10	(United States) Lawson Little	71	−1
T10	(United States) Cary Middlecoff	71	−1
T10	(United States) Toney Penna	71	−1
T10	(United States) George Schoux	71	−1

=== Second round ===
Friday, April 4, 1947

Place	Player	Score	To par
T1	(United States) Jimmy Demaret	69-71=140	−4
T1	(United States) Cary Middlecoff	71-69=140	−4
T3	(United States) Jim Ferrier	70-71=141	−3
T3	(United States) Byron Nelson	69-72=141	−3
T3	(United States) Toney Penna	71-70=141	−3
T8	(United States) Herman Barron	71-71=142	−2
T8	(United States) Claude Harmon	73-69=142	−2
T8	(United States) Lawson Little	71-71=142	−2
T8	(United States) Ed Oliver	70-72=142	−2
T8	(United States) Horton Smith	72-70=142	−2

=== Third round ===
Saturday, April 5, 1947

Place	Player	Score	To par
1	(United States) Jimmy Demaret	69-71-70=210	−6
T2	(United States) Byron Nelson	69-72-72=213	−3
T2	(United States) Jug McSpaden	74-69-70=213	−3
T4	(United States) Jim Ferrier	70-71-73=214	−2
T4	(United States) Chick Harbert	71-72-71=214	−2
T4	(United States) Ben Hogan	75-68-71=214	−2
T7	(United States) Henry Picard	73-70-72=215	−1
T7	(United States) Frank Stranahan (a)	73-72-70=215	−1
T9	(United States) Herman Barron	71-71-74=216	E
T9	(United States) Dick Metz	72-72-72=216	E
T9	(United States) Cary Middlecoff	71-69-76=216	E
T9	(United States) Ed Oliver	70-72-74=216	E
T9	(United States) Toney Penna	71-70-75=216	E

=== Final round ===
Sunday, April 6, 1947

==== Final leaderboard ====
Champion
Silver Cup winner (low amateur)
(a) = amateur
(c) = past champion

Top 10
Place	Player	Score	To par	Money (US$)
1	(United States) Jimmy Demaret (c)	69-71-70-71=281	−7	2,500
T2	(United States) Byron Nelson (c)	69-72-72-70=283	−5	1,500
T2	(United States) Frank Stranahan (a)	73-72-70-68=283	−5	0
T4	(United States) Ben Hogan	75-68-71-70=284	−4	900
T4	(United States) Jug McSpaden	74-69-70-71=284	−4	900
T6	(United States) Jim Ferrier	70-71-73-72=286	−2	625
T6	(United States) Henry Picard (c)	73-70-72-71=286	−2	625
T8	(United States) Chandler Harper	77-72-68-70=287	−1	335
T8	(United States) Lloyd Mangrum	76-73-68-70=287	−1	335
T8	(United States) Dick Metz	72-72-72-71=287	−1	335
T8	(United States) Ed Oliver	70-72-74-71=287	−1	335
T8	(United States) Toney Penna	71-70-75-71=287	−1	335

Leaderboard below the top 10
Place	Player	Score	To par	Money ($)
13	(United States) Johnny Bulla	70-75-74-69=288	E	225
T14	(United States) Dick Chapman (a)	72-71-74-72=289	+1	0
T14	(United States) Lawson Little	71-71-76-71=289	+1	188
T14	(South Africa) Bobby Locke	74-74-71-70=289	+1	188
T17	(United States) Herman Barron	71-71-74-74=290	+2	125
T17	(United States) Fred Haas	70-74-73-73=290	+2	125
T17	(United States) Johnny Palmer	70-73-74-73=290	+2	125
20	(United States) Denny Shute	73-75-72-71=291	+3	100
21	(United States) Vic Ghezzi	73-77-71-71=292	+4	50
T22	(United States) Horton Smith (c)	72-70-76-75=293	+5	
T22	(United States) Sam Snead	72-71-75-75=293	+5	
T24	(United States) Herman Keiser (c)	74-75-73-72=294	+6	
T24	(United States) Ellsworth Vines	75-71-75-73=294	+6	
T26	(United States) Claude Harmon	73-69-76-77=295	+7	
T26	(United States) Gene Sarazen (c)	75-76-74-70=295	+7	
T26	(United States) George Schneiter	70-75-78-72=295	+7	
T29	(United States) Dutch Harrison	74-71-74-77=296	+8	
T29	(United States) Clayton Heafner	75-73-75-73=296	+8	
T29	(United States) Cary Middlecoff	71-69-76-80=296	+8	
T29	(United States) Harry Todd	74-74-71-77=296	+8	
T33	(United States) Chick Harbert	71-72-71-83=297	+9	
T33	(United States) Ky Laffoon	74-74-73-76=297	+9	
T33	(United States) Frank Moore	76-74-71-76=297	+9	
T33	(United States) Lew Worsham	70-76-71-80=297	+9	
37	(United States) Ed Dudley	72-75-73-78=298	+10	
38	(United States) George Schoux	71-72-78-78=299	+11	
T39	(United States) Charles Congdon	75-74-75-76=300	+12	
T39	(United States) George Fazio	75-78-71-76=300	+12	
T39	(United States) Gene Kunes	74-73-78-75=300	+12	
T42	(United States) Bob Hamilton	72-78-74-77=301	+13	
T42	(United States) Johnny Revolta	75-73-77-76=301	+13	
T44	(United States) Ed Furgol	77-73-71-81=302	+14	
T44	(United States) Jim Turnesa	80-72-77-73=302	+14	
46	(United States) Babe Lind (a)	75-76-75-77=303	+15	
T47	(United States) Steve Kovach	78-73-78-75=304	+16	
T47	(United States) Felix Serafin	75-73-79-77=304	+16	
T47	(United States) Robert Willits (a)	76-78-75-75=304	+16	
T50	(United States) George Hamer (a)	77-77-77-74=305	+17	
T50	(United States) Skee Riegel (a)	75-80-75-75=305	+17	
52	(United States) Jim Foulis	77-76-79-74=306	+18	
T53	(United States) Johnny Farrell	80-76-76-79=311	+23	
T53	(United States) Craig Wood (c)	78-80-75-78=311	+23	
T55	(United States) Bobby Jones	75-79-78-80=312	+24	
T55	(United States) Charlie Yates (a)	77-75-81-79=312	+24	
57	(United States) Billy Burke	83-73-81-77=314	+26	
WD	(United States) Joe MacDonald (a)	85-80-81=246	+30	

==== Scorecard ====
Hole	1	2	3	4	5	6	7	8	9	10	11	12	13	14	15	16	17	18
Par	4	5	4	3	4	3	4	5	4	4	4	3	5	4	5	3	4	4
(United States) Demaret	−6	−7	−7	−7	−6	−6	−6	−6	−6	−6	−6	−6	−7	−7	−8	−7	−7	−7
(United States) Nelson	−3	−4	−4	−4	−4	−5	−5	−5	−4	−3	−3	−3	−4	−4	−5	−5	−5	−5
(United States) Stranahan	−1	−2	−2	−2	−2	−2	−2	−3	−3	−3	−3	−4	−4	−4	−5	−5	−5	−5
(United States) Hogan	−2	−3	−3	−3	−3	−3	−3	−4	−3	−3	−2	−2	−3	−3	−3	−3	−4	−4
(United States) McSpaden	−2	−3	−4	−4	−5	−4	−4	−4	−4	−4	−3	−3	−3	−4	−4	−4	−4	−4
(United States) Ferrier	−2	−3	−4	−5	−5	−5	−5	−6	−5	−4	−4	−2	−3	−3	−2	−2	−2	−2
(United States) Picard	−1	−2	−3	−2	−2	−2	−1	−1	−1	−1	−1	E	−1	−2	−2	−3	−3	−2
(United States) Harbert	−1	−2	−3	−2	−2	−2	−2	−2	−2	−2	−1	E	+1	+2	+3	+7	+9	+9

Cumulative tournament scores, relative to par

Birdie	Bogey	Double bogey	Triple bogey +
