= 1947 PGA Championship =

Coordinates: 42.451°N 83.262°W

Tournament information
- Dates: June 18–24, 1947
- Location: Southfield, Michigan, U.S.
- Course: Plum Hollow Country Club
- Organized by: PGA of America
- Tour: PGA Tour
- Format: Match play - 6 rounds

Statistics
- Par: 72
- Length: 6,922 yards (6,329 m)
- Field: 141 players, 64 to match play
- Cut: 149 (+5), playoff
- Prize fund: $17,700
- Winner's share: $3,500

Champion
- (Australia) Jim Ferrier
- def. (United States) Chick Harbert, 2 and 1

Location in the United States
Location in Michigan

The 1947 PGA Championship was the 29th PGA Championship, held June 18–24 at Plum Hollow Country Club in Southfield, Michigan, a suburb northwest of Detroit. Jim Ferrier won the match play championship, 2 and 1 over Chick Harbert in the Tuesday final; the winner's share was $3,500 and the runner-up's was $1,500. The match was tied after the first round, and again after 22 holes. Ferrier won the next three and local resident Harbert could get no closer than two holes down for the rest of the match. It was the only major title for Ferrier, a naturalized U.S. citizen born in Australia.

== Tournament summary ==
Defending champion Ben Hogan was defeated 3 and 1 in the first round by Toney Penna, who was seven-under for the 17 holes, but then lost in the next round. Jimmy Demaret earned $250 as the medalist in the stroke play qualifier at 137 (−7), but was also eliminated in the first round. Sam Snead lost in the second round to three-time champion Gene Sarazen. Hogan regained the title the next year.

The last three majors were held within several weeks in 1947: the U.S. Open was concluded several days earlier in St. Louis, Missouri. Lew Worsham defeated Sam Snead by a stroke in an 18-hole playoff on Sunday, June 15. The British Open was played the first week of July in England.

This was the first PGA Championship scheduled to conclude on Tuesday, which continued through 1956. Two-time champion Byron Nelson did not compete; his final PGA Championship was the previous year.

== Format ==
The match play format at the PGA Championship in 1947 called for 12 rounds (216 holes) in seven days:

- Wednesday and Thursday – 36-hole stroke play qualifier, 18 holes per day;
  - defending champion Ben Hogan and top 63 professionals advanced to match play
- Friday – first two rounds, 18 holes each
- Saturday – third round – 36 holes
- Sunday – quarterfinals – 36 holes
- Monday – semifinals – 36 holes
- Tuesday – final – 36 holes

== Final results ==
Tuesday, June 24, 1947

Place	Player	Money ($)
1	(Australia) Jim Ferrier	3,500
2	(United States) Chick Harbert	1,500
T3	(United States) Art Bell	750
T3	(United States) Vic Ghezzi	750
T5	(United States) Leland Gibson	500
T5	(United States) Ky Laffoon	500
T5	(United States) Lloyd Mangrum	500
T5	(United States) Lew Worsham	500

== Final eight bracket ==
Quarter-finals; June 22
Jim Ferrier	4&3
Lloyd Mangrum
Art Bell	2up
Ky Laffoon
Chick Harbert	2up
Leland Gibson
Vic Ghezzi	3&2
Lew Worsham

Semi-finals; June 23
Jim Ferrier	10&9
Art Bell
Chick Harbert	6&5
Vic Ghezzi

Finals; June 24
Jim Ferrier	2&1
Chick Harbert

== Final match scorecards ==
Morning

Hole	1	2	3	4	5	6	7	8	9	10	11	12	13	14	15	16	17	18
Par	5	3	4	4	3	5	4	5	3	4	4	3	4	3	4	4	5	5
(Australia) Ferrier	5	3	3	4	3	5	4	5	3	4	3	3	5	3	5	4	5	4
(United States) Harbert	4	2	4	5	3	4	4	5	3	4	4	4	4	3	3	5	5	4
Leader	H1	H2	H1	–	–	H1	H1	H1	H1	H1	–	F1	–	–	H1	–	–	–

Afternoon

Hole	1	2	3	4	5	6	7	8	9	10	11	12	13	14	15	16	17	18
Par	5	3	4	4	3	5	4	5	3	4	4	3	4	3	4	4	5	5
(Australia) Ferrier	4	3	3	5	2	4	4	4	3	4	3	3	4	3	4	5	5	
(United States) Harbert	4	3	4	4	3	6	5	4	3	4	3	2	5	3	4	4	5	
Leader	–	–	F1	–	F1	F2	F3	F3	F3	F3	F3	F2	F3	F3	F3	F2	F2	

Birdie	Bogey	Double bogey
