= Middle Atlantic PGA Championship =

Golf tournament

The Middle Atlantic PGA Championship is a golf tournament that is the championship of the Middle Atlantic section of the PGA of America. The tournament has been played annually since 1932 in Virginia, Maryland, or Washington, DC. Fred Funk, eight-time winner on the PGA Tour, holds the record with six Middle Atlantic PGA victories. Other PGA Tour winners who have also won the Middle Atlantic PGA Championship include Chandler Harper (seven time PGA tour winner and 1950 PGA Championship winner), Bobby Cruickshank (17-time PGA tour winner), Lew Worsham (four-time PGA tour winner), and George Fazio (two-time PGA tour winner and golf course designer).

== Winners ==
Year	Champion	Venue	Location
2026	Joey Faulconer	Hayfields Country Club	Hunt Valley, Maryland
2025	David Hutsell	Lakewood Country Club	Bethesda, Maryland
2024	Bill Fedder	Hermitage Country Club	Manakin Sabot, Virginia
2023	Greg Pieczynski	Baltimore Country Club	Baltimore, Maryland
2022	Richard Mast	The Club at Creighton Farms	Aldie, Virginia
2021	Larkin Gross	Westwood Country Club; River Bend Club	Vienna, Virginia; Great Falls, Virginia
2020	Yong Joo	Golden Horseshoe Golf Club	Williamsburg, Virginia
2019	Steven Delmar	Trump National Golf Club	Washington D.C.
2018	Bryan Jackson	Baltimore Country Club	Lutherville, Maryland
2017	Josh Speight	Farmington Country Club, Spring Creek Golf Club	Charlottesville, Virginia
2016	Jimmy Flippen	Kingsmill Resort, Williamsburg Golf Club	Williamsburg, Virginia
2015	David Hutsell	Congressional Country Club	Bethesda, Maryland
2014	Pleasant Hughes	Country Club of Virginia	Richmond, Virginia
2013	Dirk Schultz	Golden Horseshoe Golf Club	Williamsburg, Virginia
2012	Faber Jamerson	Kingsmill Resort	Williamsburg, Virginia
2011	David Hutsell	Trump National Golf Club	Washington D.C.
2010	David Hutsell	Golden Horseshoe Golf Club	Williamsburg, Virginia
2009	Rick Schuller	Woodmont Country Club	Rockville, Maryland
2008	Rick Schuller	Golden Horseshoe Golf Club	Williamsburg, Virginia
2007	Wayne DeFrancesco	Golden Horseshoe Golf Club	Williamsburg, Virginia
2006	Chip Sullivan	Congressional Country Club	Bethesda, Maryland
2005	Mark Evenson	Hillendale CC & Mountain Branch GC	Phoenix, Maryland
2004	Rick Schuller	Golden Horseshoe Golf Club	Williamsburg, Virginia
2003	Rick Schuller	Musket Ridge GC & Maryland National	Middletown, Maryland
2002	Chip Sullivan	Golden Horseshoe Golf Club	Williamsburg, Virginia
2001	Wayne DeFrancesco	Golden Horseshoe Golf Club	Williamsburg, Virginia
2000	Wayne DeFrancesco	Hillendale CC & Hayfields CC	Phoenix, Maryland
1999	Mark Evenson	Lowes Island & River Creek Club	Washington D.C.
1998	Ron Cooke	The Homestead, Cascades & Lower Cascades	Hot Springs, Virginia
1997	Rob McNamara	Tides Inn & Golden Eagle	Irvington, Virginia
1996	Chip Sullivan	Golden Horseshoe Golf Club	Williamsburg, Virginia
1995	Bud Lintelman	Two Rivers Country Club	Williamsburg, Virginia
1994	Dave Quelland	Two Rivers Country Club	Williamsburg, Virginia
1993	Skeeter Heath	Two Rivers Country Club	Williamsburg, Virginia
1992	Mike West	Ford's Colony, Golden Horseshoe	Williamsburg, Virginia
1991	Bruce Lehnhard	Kingsmill, Golden Horseshoe & Ford's Colony	Williamsburg, Virginia
1990	Chris Peddicord	Kingsmill, Golden Horseshoe & Ford's Colony	Williamsburg, Virginia
1989	Fred Funk	Golden Horseshoe Golf Club	Williamsburg, Virginia
1988	Fred Funk	Golden Horseshoe Golf Club	Williamsburg, Virginia
1987	Fred Funk	Golden Horseshoe Golf Club	Williamsburg, Virginia
1986	Larry Ringer	Golden Horseshoe Golf Club	Williamsburg, Virginia
1985	Woody FitzHugh	Golden Horseshoe Golf Club	Williamsburg, Virginia
1984	Del Snyder	Golden Horseshoe Golf Club	Williamsburg, Virginia
1983	Wheeler Stewart	Golden Horseshoe Golf Club	Williamsburg, Virginia
1982	Mike Wynn	Hobbit's Glen Golf Club	Columbia, Maryland
1981	Woody FitzHugh	Shannon Green (no longer exists)	Fredericksburg, Virginia
1980	Mark Alwin	Shannon Green (no longer exists)	Fredericksburg, Virginia
1979	Fred Funk	Golden Horseshoe Golf Club	Williamsburg, Virginia
1978	Fred Funk	Golden Horseshoe Golf Club	Williamsburg, Virginia
1977	Fred Funk	Golden Horseshoe Golf Club	Williamsburg, Virginia
1976	Larry Ringer	Golden Horseshoe Golf Club	Williamsburg, Virginia
1975	Woody FitzHugh	Golden Horseshoe Golf Club	Williamsburg, Virginia
1974	Del Snyder	Golden Horseshoe Golf Club	Williamsburg, Virginia
1973	Wheeler Stewart	Golden Horseshoe Golf Club	Williamsburg, Virginia
1972	Mike Wynn	Hobbit's Glen Golf Club	Columbia, Maryland
1971	Woody FitzHugh	Shannon Green (no longer exists)	Fredericksburg, Virginia
1970	Mark Alwin	Shannon Green (no longer exists)	Fredericksburg, Virginia
1969	Larry Wise	Hobbit's Glen Golf Club	Columbia, Maryland
1968	Jimmy Bellizzi	Hobbit's Glen Golf Club	Columbia, Maryland
1967	Claude King	Woodmont, South Course	Rockville, Maryland
1966	Paul Haviland	Maryland Golf & Country Club	Bel Air, Maryland
1965	Dick Whetzle	Elizabeth Manor Country Club	Portsmouth, Virginia
1964	Bill Deck	Manor Country Club	Rockville, Maryland
1963	Richard Sleichter	Fountain Head Country Club	Fountainhead-Orchard Hills, Maryland
1962	Richard Sleichter	Homestead - Cascades	Hot Springs, Virginia
1961	Clare Emery	Prince George's Country Club (relocated)	Landover, Maryland
1960	Charlie Bassler	Turf Valley Country Club	Ellicott City, Maryland
1959	Charlie Bassler	Hobbit's Glen Golf Club	Columbia, Maryland
1958	Clarence Doser	Hobbit's Glen Golf Club	Columbia, Maryland
1957	Charlie Bassler	Woodmont, South Course	Rockville, Maryland
1956	Luke Barnes	Maryland Golf & Country Club	Bel Air, Maryland
1955	Clarence Doser	Elizabeth Manor Country Club	Portsmouth, Virginia
1954	Chandler Harper	Manor Country Club	Rockville, Maryland
1953	Charlie Bassler	Fountain Head Country Club	Fountainhead-Orchard Hills, Maryland
1952	Charlie Bassler	Homestead - Cascades	Hot Springs, Virginia
1951	John Musser	Prince George's Country Club (relocated)	Landover, Maryland
1950	George Fazio	Turf Valley Country Club	Ellicott City, Maryland
1949	Ralph Beach	Woodholme Country Club	Pikesville, Maryland
1948	Andy Gibson	Baltimore Country Club - Five Farms	Lutherville-Timonium, Maryland
1947	Lew Worsham	Hampton Country Club (now The Woodlands)	Windsor Mill, Maryland
1946	Lew Worsham	Woodholme Country Club	Pikesville, Maryland
1945	Bobby Cruickshank	Woodmont Country Club	Rockville, Maryland
1944	Andy Gibson	Rolling Road Golf Club	Catonsville, Maryland
1943	No tournament (World War II)		
1942	Lew Worsham	Indian Spring (club relocated)	Silver Spring, Maryland
1941	Jack Isaacs	Country Club of Virginia, James River	Richmond, Virginia
1940	E.R. "Rut" Coffey	Rodgers Forge (now CC of Maryland)	Towson, Maryland
1939	Cliff Spencer	Columbia Country Club	Chevy Chase, Maryland
1938	Leo Walper	Chamberlin Golf Club (now The Woodlands)	Windsor Mill, Maryland
1937	Leo Walper	Chamberlin Golf Club (now The Woodlands)	Windsor Mill, Maryland
1936	Charles Betschler	Rolling Road Golf Club	Catonsville, Maryland
1935	John Bass	Indian Spring (club relocated)	Silver Spring, Maryland
1934	Charles Betschler	Hillendale (club relocated)	Phoenix, Maryland
1933	Ralph Beach	Chevy Chase Club	Chevy Chase, Maryland
1932	Glenn Spencer	Maryland Country Club	Towson, Maryland
