= Hutsell =

Hutsell is a surname. Notable people with the surname include:

- David Hutsell (born 1970), American golfer
- Melanie Hutsell (born 1968), American actress and comedian
