= Sequoyah Country Club =

Private Country Club and golf course in Oakland, California, USA

- Location within California Location within the United States
- 37°45′57″N 122°08′05″W

Club information
- Location: Oakland, California
- Established: 1913
- Type: Private
- Owner: 365 Proprietary Members
- Tota holes: 18
- Tournaments: Oakland Open (1938–44); U.S. Women's Amateur Qualifier (2013–14)
- Greens: Poa Annua
- Fairways: Rye, Poa, others
- Website: www.sequoyahcc.com
- Designed by: William J. "Willie" Lock; Seth Raynor; Chandler Egan; Doug Nickels
- Par: 70 (blue tees)
- Length: 6,100 yards (5,600 m)
- Course rating: 70.2
- Slope rating: 135

Sequoyah Country Club is an 18 hole, private equity, member-owned golf course and country club in Oakland, California. Founded in 1913, it hosted the Oakland Open from 1938 to 1944 – one of the premier professional golf tournaments on the Pacific coast, which featured prominently in the early golfing careers of Ben Hogan, Sam Snead, Byron Nelson, Jimmy Demaret, and others.

== History ==
On October 3, 1913, a group of 23 citizens, acting as initial underwriters, held their first meeting at the St. Francis Hotel in San Francisco, California and organized a new golf club. They intentionally chose the traditional Indian spelling of 'Sequoyah' instead of the more commonly used version of the name 'Sequoia'. The nine member board of directors consisted of:

Name	Role
Phil T. Clay	Chairman of the Board
Harvey B. Lindsay	Secretary
Arthur D. King	Director
Hugh Goodfellow	Director
Barton T. Bean	Director
William Rheem	Director
W.P. Johnson	Director
Charles H. Bentley	Director
Dennis Searles	Director

This board appointed committee leaders, including the membership committee, whose identity they kept secret. The golf club's bylaws allowed for 350 total members, of which 100 prospective members were already identified. Others who attended the founding meeting included: John C. Shipp, Frank H. Proctor, J.M. Stephens, J.H. Hunt, A.C. Baumbartner, Walter J. Wilson, M.H. Robbins Jr., K.B. Putnam, A.J. Coogan, W.A. Bissell, J.F. Neville, Fred Sherman, E.B. King, W.R. Thorsen, F.E. McGurrin, P.K. Gordon, and E.G. Garden.

Several of the early Sequoyah members were also members of Claremont Country Club.

Sequoyah is situated on a 180-acre parcel of land that encompasses a 6300-yard golf course with views as far north as Mt. Tamalpais, Golden Gate, and across the bay to Redwood City on the peninsula. The golf course is within an hour of San Francisco or Oakland downtown, and easily accessible by the Southern Pacific Railroad. The land is notable for its gently rolling terrain and soil conditions—sandy loam, with no trace of adobe clay.

== Golf course ==
At 6,100 yards, Sequoyah is short by modern standards, where courses are often 1,000 yards longer. However, it has small, challenging greens, and due to the course's hilly topology, lies are very often uneven.

The course record was established in 1955 by PGA professional Don Whitt, who was the club's first assistant golf professional before turning pro.

Unlike other local courses from its era, no public roads interrupt the layout. Sequoyah is completely fenced in and there are no homes that openly abut the golf course. It is not unusual to see wild turkey, deer, fox, vultures, eagles and falcons at Sequoyah.

== Club house ==
The club house was designed by architect Edward G. Garden, with all the amenities consistent with a modern country club for that era—including a main dining room, lunchroom grill, women's dressing room, men's locker room, main living room, sleeping accommodations for resident staff, open air swimming pool, tennis courts, twenty sleeping rooms for members, automobile parking, stables, and a golf pro shop. The original plan also reserved space for a polo field and race track.

=== Scorecard ===
Sequoyah Country Club
Tee	Rating/Slope	1	2	3	4	5	6	7	8	9	Out	10	11	12	13	14	15	16	17	18	In	Total
Men's Blue	70.2 / 135	325	190	403	374	137	532	344	397	349	3051	371	453	175	337	235	328	484	216	450	3049	6100
White	69.6 / 132	307	175	394	367	137	516	330	369	334	2929	353	423	155	325	217	323	468	194	440	2829	5827
Gold	67.2 / 129	294	148	386	360	119	461	305	326	300	2699	323	423	128	307	217	317	454	147	433	2749	5448
SI	Men's	17	13	5	1	15	3	11	7	9		4	2	16	12	10	14	6	8	18
Par	Men's	4	3	4	4	3	5	4	4	4	35	4	4	3	4	3	4	5	3	5	35	70
Green	67.6 / 130	322	153	365	407	368	455	117	327	448	2962	109	458	340	134	332	400	446	375	379	2973	5532
White	71.1 / 134	402	211	455	427	407	544	174	354	602	3576	218	507	415	187	454	439	579	437	466	3702	5827
SI	Women's	13	15	3	5	17	1	7	9	11		4	6	16	10	18	12	2	14	8
Par	Women's	4	3	4	4	3	5	4	4	4	35	4	5	4	3	4	4	5	3	5	37	72

== Tournaments hosted ==
- April 1916 Panama Pacific International Exposition (PPIE) Tournament Men's Professional Golf Event
- May 1916 Panama Pacific International Exposition (PPIE) Tournament Men's Open Championship played over 36 holes for medal play
- August 2012 U.S. Mid-Amateur Qualifying Tournament
- July 2013 U.S. Women's Amateur Qualifying Tournament
- July 2014 U.S. Women's Amateur Qualifying Tournament
- June 2015 U.S. Girls' Junior Qualifying Tournament
- June 2017 U.S. Girls' Junior Qualifying Tournament
- July 2018 U.S. Women's Amateur Qualifying Tournament
- July 2021 U.S. Girls' Junior Qualifying Tournament

== Gallery ==
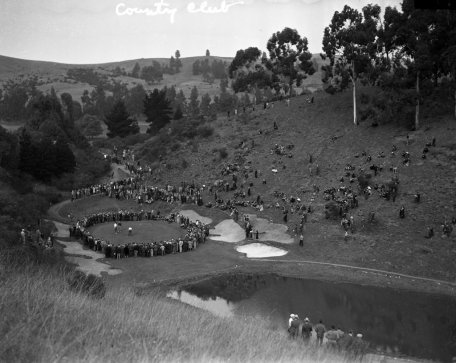
16th green, 484 yard par-5

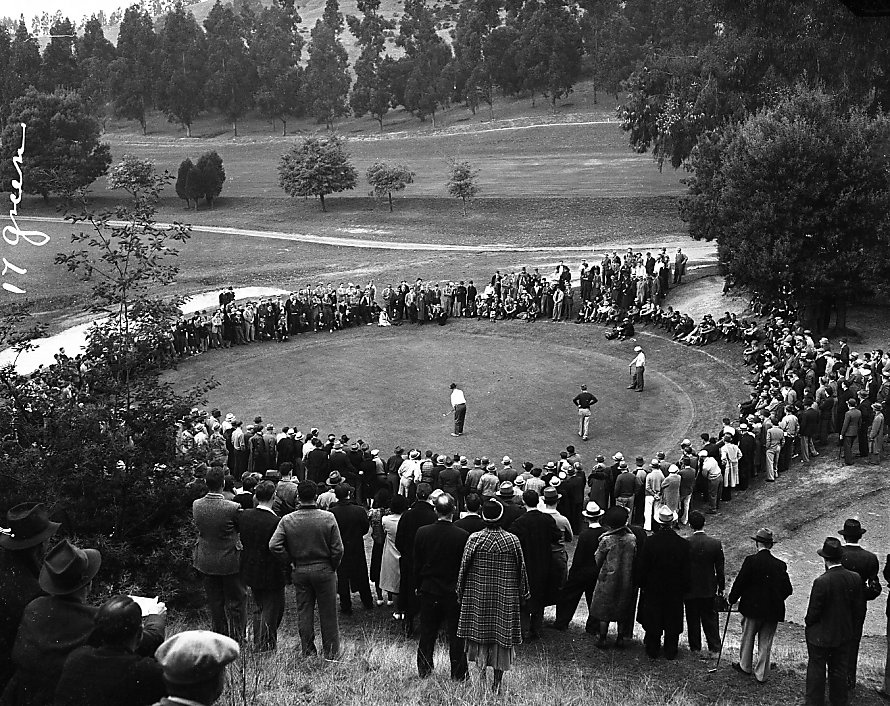
17th green

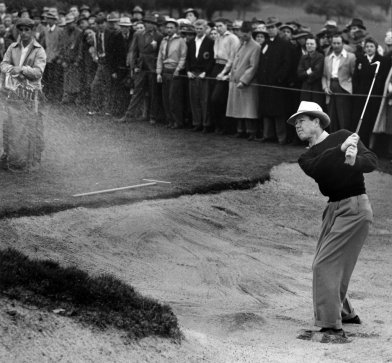
Byron Nelson at Sequoyah's 18th hole
