= Edgewood Golf Course =

Edgewood Golf Course may refer to:

- Edgewood Tahoe Resort, on the south shore of Lake Tahoe in Stateline, Nevada, US
- Edgewood Golf Course, in Fargo, North Dakota, US
