= St. Louis Country Club =

Country club in St. Louis, Missouri, United States

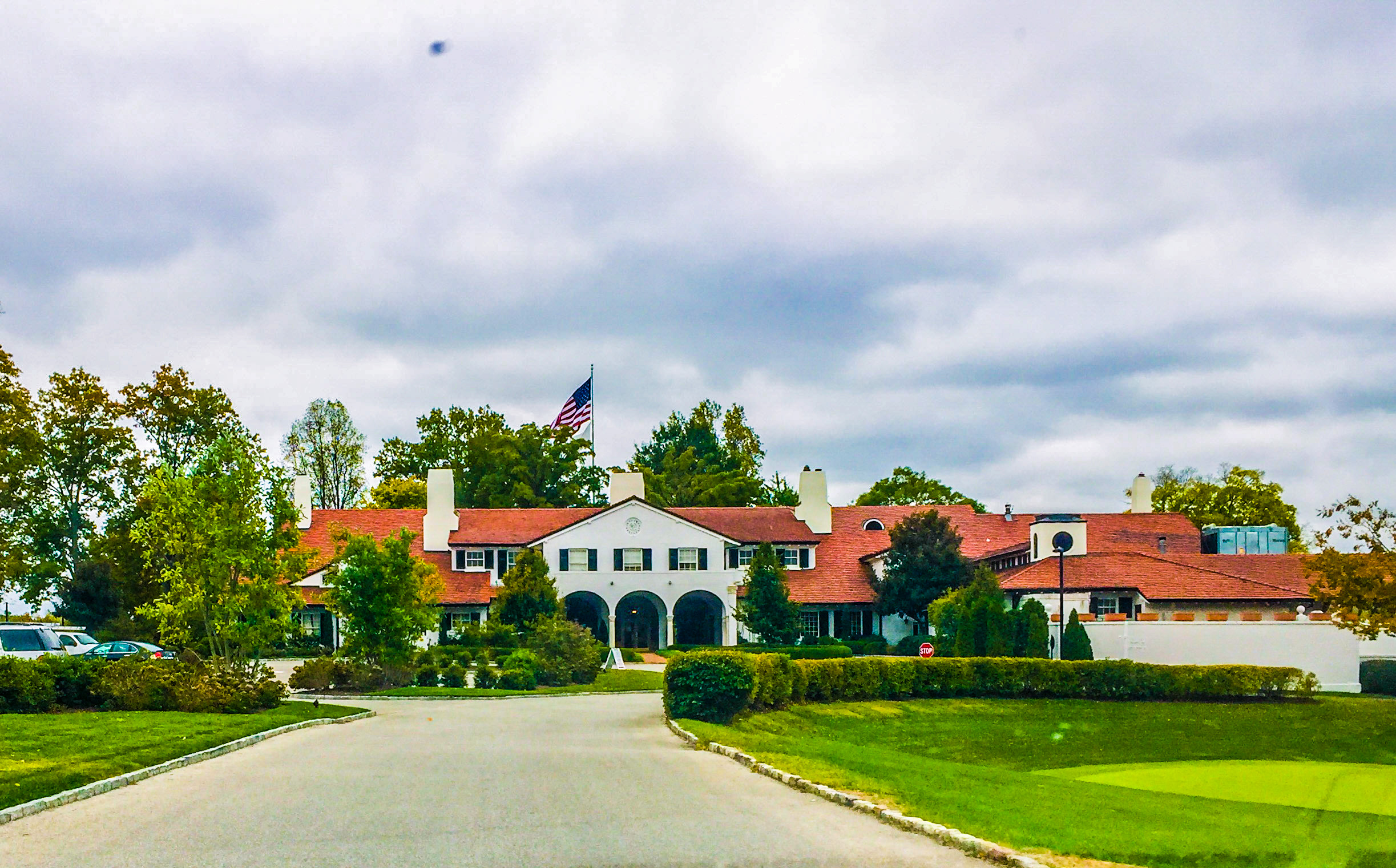

- Location within the United States Location within Missouri
- 38°39′1.6″N 90°22′45.5″W

Club information
- Established: 1892 (Golf in 1896)
- Type: Private
- Total holes: 18
- Tournaments: 1947 U.S. Open; 1921 U.S. Amateur; 1960 U.S. Amateur; 1925 U.S. Women's Amateur; 1972 U.S. Women's Amateur; 1919 Trans-Mississippi Amateur; 2014 Curtis Cup
- Greens: Bent
- Fairways: Bent
- Designed by: Charles Blair Macdonald
- Par: 71
- Length: 6,542

St. Louis Country Club (SLCC) is a country club located in Ladue, Missouri, a suburb of St. Louis. It is recognized by the United States Golf Association (USGA) as one of the first 100 Clubs in America.

== History ==
The club was founded in 1892 as a polo club. Three years later, it moved to a site in the city of Clayton and hired James Foulis, winner of the 1896 United States Open Golf Championship, to build a nine-hole course. The course opened in October 1896.

In 1913, as Clayton became more populated, the club sought to move further west. It negotiated the purchase of a site at the corner of Ladue and Price Roads from the Archdiocese of St. Louis.

Golf chairman George Herbert Walker was placed in charge of building an 18-hole golf course. To design it, Walker hired Charles Blair Macdonald, a pioneer in American golf-course design and a founder of the United States Golf Association. Macdonald hired Seth Raynor to do the engineering on the course, making it one of the few Macdonald-Raynor designs. It was also the furthest west of his courses.

Like many clubs throughout the United States, SLCC has a history of anti-Semitism and racism. Long considered a pinnacle of WASP culture in St. Louis, the club disaffiliated from the USGA in the early 1990s rather than admit any Black members. It chose to remain unaffiliated several years later even as other clubs began admitting Black members. As of 2006, the club had one Black member.

== The USGA Championships ==
=== 1921 U.S. Amateur - First Amateur played west of the Mississippi ===
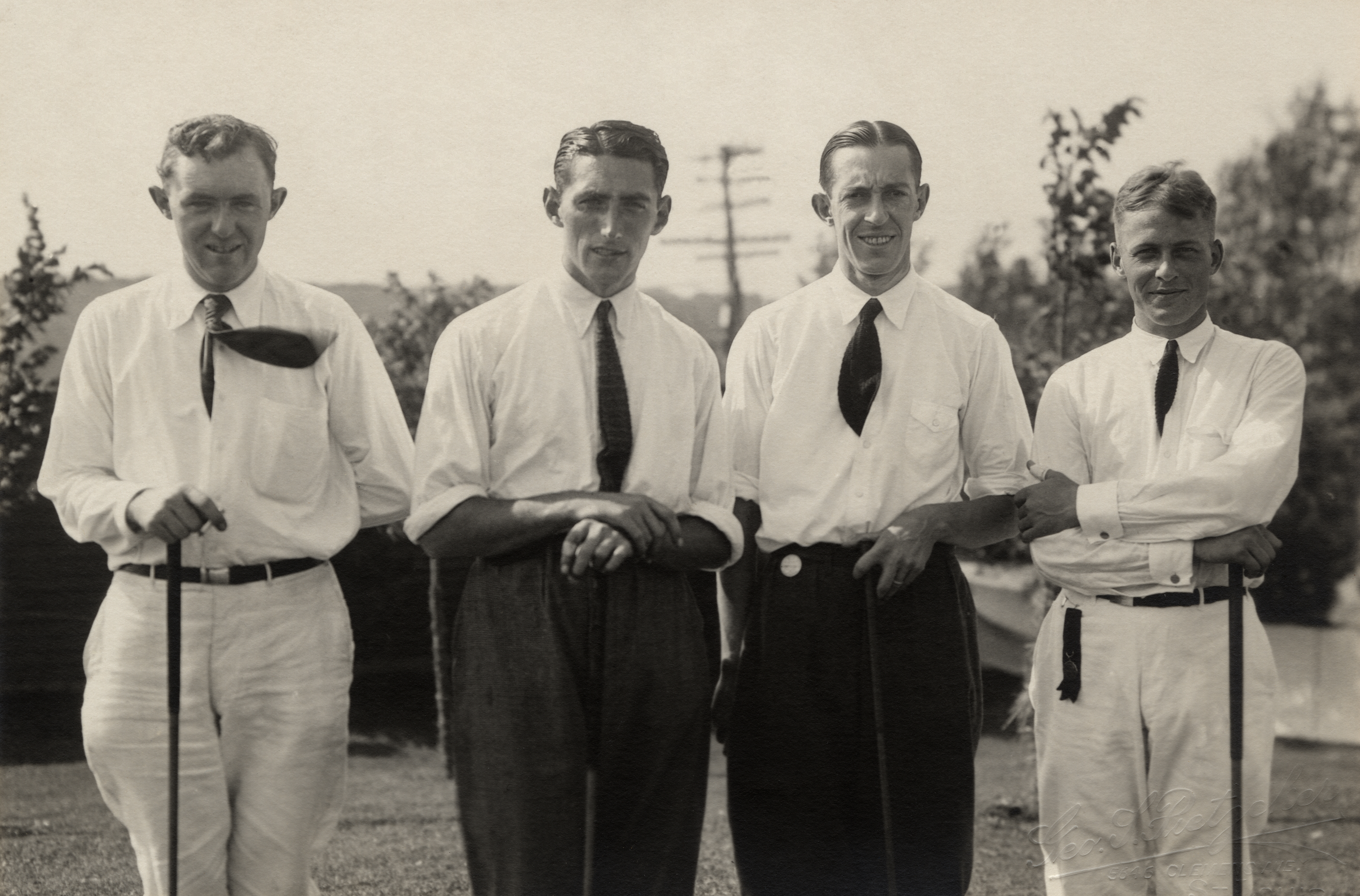
Jesse Guilford, Tommy Armour, Francis Ouimet, and Bobby Jones at the 1921 U.S. Amateur at St. Louis CC.

In 1919, Stewart Maiden left East Lake Golf Club in Atlanta, Georgia, to fulfill a promise he made if St. Louis was awarded the 1921 U.S. Amateur. He remained at St. Louis through 1921 as head professional before returning to East Lake. At the 1921 U.S. Amateur, a 19-year-old Bobby Jones was a participant, though he lost in the quarterfinals to Englishman Willie Hunter, the recent winner of the British Amateur. The Jones-Hunter match was well played during the early holes. However, on the 8th hole - the club's Cape Hole, Jones attempted to drive over the trees, which guarded the right side of the fairway. When his ball clipped a tree, it fell into the creek running down the right side, losing the hole. He never recovered and Hunter went on to win the match 2 and 1. In the other quarterfinal matches, Charles 'Chick' Evans downed Jess Sweetser 1up, while Robert A. Gardner defeated Rudy Knepper 4 and 3, and Jess Guilford bettered Harrison Johnston 1 up. With Guilford winning 5 and 4 over Evans in the semifinals, and Gardner defeating Hunter 6 and 5, the Finals pairing was set. In the championship match, Guilford defeated Gardner 7 and 6.

=== 1925 U.S. Women's Amateur ===
In 1925, the St. Louis hosted the U.S. Women's Amateur. Alexa Stirling (Fraser), the 1916, 1919 and 1920 champion and the 1922 champion Glenna Collett (Vare) reached the finals, with Collett winning the final match 9 and 8 over Stirling. Collett would go on to win a total of six U.S. Women's Amateur Championships, with the last coming in 1935. Stirling, a 3-time U.S. Women's Amateur Champion, was another of the East Lake "whiz kids" taught by Stewart Maiden. Collett was a member of the first Curtis Cup team in 1932 and served as Captain on four occasions. In 1975, she was inducted into the World Golf Hall of Fame.

=== 1947 U.S. Open ===
In 1947, St. Louis played host to the U.S. Open Championship. Among the favorites for the title were: Ben Hogan, Byron Nelson, Bobby Locke, Jim Ferrier, and Sam Snead. While it was generally believed that the course, playing 6,542 yards, would be overwhelmed by the players and that Ralph Guldahl's record score of 64 would be broken, in the end, the pros would shoot no less than 67, with amateur Jim McHale Jr. posting the championship's lowest score of 65 in this third round. At the conclusion of 72-holes, Snead and Lew Worsham were tied with 282 totals, setting up a playoff on Sunday. (Before 1965, the final two rounds of the U.S. Open were played on Saturday)

==== Playoff ====
During the 18-hole playoff, Worsham and Snead approached the 18th green, once again tied. Worsham chipped toward the hole, with his ball hitting the flagstick and settling 29 1/2 inches from the hole. Snead had a putt of approximately 15-feet, which he left short. Officials were called in by Worsham to measure which player was away. (In this era in golf, the continuous putting rule was not in effect, so the player furthest from the hole would putt first). The officials determined Snead was 30 1/2 inches from the hole. Snead, obviously upset with the delay, stood over his ball and missed the putt. Worsham calmly rolled in his putt to claim the U.S. Open crown.

=== 1960 U.S. Amateur ===
In 1960, the club hosted the U.S. Amateur once again. Jack Nicklaus was the defending champion and was the odds-on favorite to win again. Other favorites included Deane Beman, Charles Coe, William Hyndman, Billy Joe Patton, William Campbell, Phil Rodgers, Harvie Ward, John Farquhar, and Robert W. Gardner.

The championship was played entirely at match play, with players seeded into four quadrants. Nicklaus won his first round match against John Donahue Jr., 1up, and then Ken Finke 4 and 3 in the second round. After defeating Phil Rogers 6 and 5 in the third round he met relative-unknown Charles Lewis of Little Rock, Arkansas. In perhaps one of the biggest upsets in U.S. Amateur history, Lewis defeated Nicklaus 5 and 3.

Meanwhile, Beman, who would become Commissioner of the PGA later in his career, was winning his matches with relative ease. In the quarterfinals he met Bill Hyndman, giving him his toughest match as Beman won 1up in 19 holes. After defeating Farquhar 5 and 4 in the semifinals, he dispatched Gardner 6 and 4 in the finals to win the Amateur title.

=== 1972 U.S. Women's Amateur ===
In 1972, the USGA again called upon St. Louis to host a championship, this time the U.S. Women's Amateur. With a stellar field that included Laura Baugh, Carol Semple, Beth Daniel, Jane Bastanchury Booth, Mary Bea Porter, Deborah Massey, Cynthia Hill, and Barbara McIntire, it would be Mary Budke, from Dundee, Oregon, who would take the title. Though Budke would play some of the best golf of her career that week, her qualifying score of 161 was just one stroke inside of the qualifying number of 162. Budke won her first three matches by scores of 1up, 3 and 2, and 1up in 19 holes, to reach the semifinals. There she met Barbara Boddie, who was also playing very well that week. It would be a combination of Budke's solid play and Boddie's missed opportunities that would decide which of them would play for the title, as Budke won 1up in 19 holes for the victory. Her opponent would be Cynthia Hill from St. Petersburg, Florida. They had met earlier, with Hill getting the best of Budke in that previous match. However, in the match for the crown, Budke would prevail, earning a 5 and 4 victory.

=== 2014 Curtis Cup Match ===
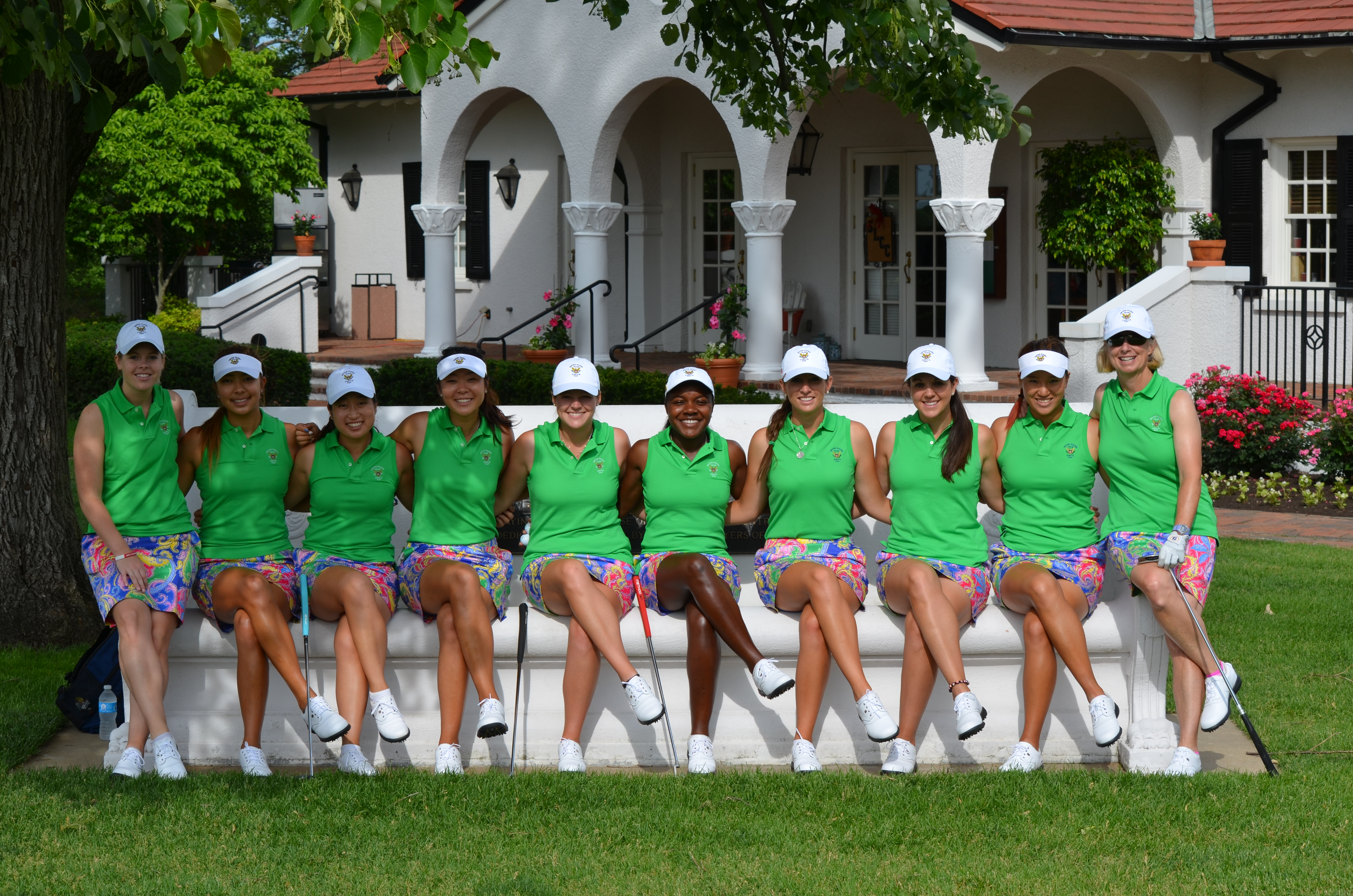
(L-R) Manager Liz Carl, Erynne Lee, Kyung Kim, Alison Lee, Ally McDonald, Mariah Stackhouse, Ashlan Ramsey, Emma Talley, Annie Park, Captain Ellen Port

For the sixth time in the club's history, the club would host another USGA championship. However, this event would be a team competition, the 2014 Curtis Cup match between top female amateurs from the United States against those representing Great Britain and Ireland. Six-time USGA champion, St. Louisan Ellen Port (she would win a seventh USGA title, the U.S. Senior Women's Amateur in 2016), was selected as Captain for the U.S. squad.

With crowds of over 6,000 present over the three days of the Match, the U.S. team took a commanding 5–1 lead at the end of Friday's matches. They extended the lead to 9 1/2 to 2 1/2 at the close of the matches on Saturday. The individual matches on Sunday saw University of Alabama's Emma Talley, the 2012 U.S. Women's Amateur Champion, earn the deciding point on the fifteenth green as the U.S. team reclaimed the Curtis Cup. Besides Talley, other players on the U.S. squad were Kyung Kim, Alison Lee, Erynne Lee, Ally McDonald, Annie Park, Ashlan Ramsey, and Mariah Stackhouse.

== Tournaments ==
=== Major championship ===
Year	Tournament	Winner	Winner's share ($)
1947	U.S. Open	(United States) Lew Worsham	2,500

^ 18 hole playoffs: 1947

=== Amateur championships ===
Year	Tournament	Winner
1921	U.S. Amateur	(United States) Jesse Guilford
1925	U.S. Women's Amateur	(United States) Glenna Collett Vare
1960	U.S. Amateur	(United States) Deane Beman
1972	U.S. Women's Amateur	(United States) Mary Budke

=== International team competitions ===
Year	Tournament	Winner
2014	Curtis Cup	United States

== See also ==
- Veiled Prophet Parade and Ball § After coronation
