= Plum Hollow Country Club =

Country club in Southfield, Michigan

Coordinates: 42°27′04″N 83°15′43″W

Plum Hollow Country Club is a country club located in Southfield, Michigan, a suburb northwest of Detroit The club is privately owned and was established in 1921. Plum Hollow was designed by architects Harry Colt and Charles Hugh Alison of the British firm Colt and Alison. The PGA Championship was held at its golf course in 1947; then a match play event, it was won by Jim Ferrier. Plum Hollow also hosted the 1957 Western Open which was won by Doug Ford, and also hosted the 2015 Michigan Amateur. The club is currently managed by PGA Pro Richard Burkardt.
