= 1947 U.S. Open (golf) =

Coordinates: 38.65°N 90.38°W

Tournament information
- Dates: June 12–15, 1947
- Location: Ladue, Missouri
- Course: St. Louis Country Club
- Organized by: USGA
- Tour: PGA Tour

Statistics
- Par: 71
- Length: 6,532 yards (5,973 m)
- Field: 146 players, 75 after cut
- Cut: 151 (+9)
- Prize fund: $10,000
- Winner's share: $2,500

Champion
- (United States) Lew Worsham
- 282 (−2), playoff

Location in the United States
Location in Missouri

The 1947 U.S. Open was the 47th U.S. Open, held June 12–15 at St. Louis Country Club in Ladue, Missouri, a suburb west of St. Louis. Lew Worsham denied Sam Snead his elusive U.S. Open title by prevailing in an 18-hole playoff. For Snead, it was his second of four career runner-up finishes at the Open.

In the third round, amateur Jim McHale Jr. tied the tournament record with a 65, and he established a new nine-hole record with a 30 on the front nine. That mark was equaled fifteen times before it was broken in 1995 by Neal Lancaster, who carded a 29 on the back nine in the final round.

Worsham's win marked the 17th consecutive victory in a major championship for an American-born golfer. This remains the longest stretch ever for American golfers. A significant reason this occurred is because the British Open, which is usually won by international golfers, was cancelled for most of the 1940s due to World War II.

The purse was $10,000 with a winner's share of $2,000 and $1,500 for the runner-up. In addition, both playoff participants received a $500 bonus.

== Course layout ==
| Hole | 1 | 2 | 3 | 4 | 5 | 6 | 7 | 8 | 9 | Out | 10 | 11 | 12 | 13 | 14 | 15 | 16 | 17 | 18 | In | Total |
|---|---|---|---|---|---|---|---|---|---|---|---|---|---|---|---|---|---|---|---|---|---|
| Yards | 395 | 233 | 187 | 421 | 545 | 325 | 150 | 347 | 537 | 3,140 | 349 | 399 | 180 | 576 | 416 | 500 | 188 | 365 | 419 | 3,392 | 6,532 |
| Par | 4 | 3 | 3 | 4 | 5 | 4 | 3 | 4 | 5 | 35 | 4 | 4 | 3 | 5 | 4 | 5 | 3 | 4 | 4 | 36 | 71 |

== Round summaries ==
=== First round ===
Thursday, June 12, 1947

| Place | Player | Score | To par |
|---|---|---|---|
| T1 | (United States) Chick Harbert | 67 | −4 |
| T1 | (United States) Henry Ransom | 67 | −4 |
| T1 | (United States) Harry Todd | 67 | −4 |
| 4 | (South Africa) Bobby Locke | 68 | −3 |
| T5 | (United States) Leland Gibson | 69 | −2 |
| T5 | (United States) Otto Greiner | 69 | −2 |
| T5 | (United States) Dick Metz | 69 | −2 |
| T5 | (United States) Bud Ward (a) | 69 | −2 |
| T9 | (United States) Ed Furgol | 70 | −1 |
| T9 | (United States) Ben Hogan | 70 | −1 |
| T9 | (United States) Al Smith | 70 | −1 |
| T9 | (United States) Horton Smith | 70 | −1 |
| T9 | (United States) Lew Worsham | 70 | −1 |

=== Second round ===
Friday, June 13, 1947

| Place | Player | Score | To par |
|---|---|---|---|
| T1 | (United States) Chick Harbert | 67-72=139 | −3 |
| T1 | (United States) Dick Metz | 69-70=139 | −3 |
| 3 | (United States) Lew Worsham | 70-70=140 | −2 |
| T4 | (United States) Jim Ferrier | 71-70=141 | −1 |
| T4 | (United States) Henry Ransom | 67-74=141 | −1 |
| T4 | (United States) Bud Ward (a) | 69-72=141 | −1 |
| T7 | (South Africa) Bobby Locke | 68-74=142 | E |
| T7 | (United States) Johnny Palmer | 72-70=142 | E |
| T7 | (United States) Sam Snead | 72-70=142 | E |
| T7 | (United States) Harry Todd | 67-75=142 | E |

=== Third round ===
Saturday, June 14, 1947 (morning)

| Place | Player | Score | To par |
|---|---|---|---|
| 1 | (United States) Lew Worsham | 70-70-71=211 | −2 |
| T2 | (South Africa) Bobby Locke | 68-74-70=212 | −1 |
| T2 | (United States) Sam Snead | 72-70-70=212 | −1 |
| T4 | (United States) Ed Oliver | 73-70-71=214 | +1 |
| T4 | (United States) Bud Ward (a) | 69-72-73=214 | +1 |
| T6 | (United States) Jim Ferrier | 71-70-74=215 | +2 |
| T6 | (United States) Ben Hogan | 70-75-70=215 | +2 |
| T6 | (Australia) Joe Kirkwood, Sr. | 72-73-70=215 | +2 |
| 9 | (United States) Sammy Byrd | 72-74-70=216 | +3 |
| T10 | (United States) Ed Furgol | 70-75-72=217 | +4 |
| T10 | (United States) Dick Metz | 69-70-78=217 | +4 |
| T10 | (United States) Johnny Palmer | 72-70-75=217 | +4 |
| T10 | (United States) Paul Runyan | 71-74-72=217 | +4 |

=== Final round ===
Saturday, June 14, 1947

Worsham began the final round with a stroke lead over Snead and Bobby Locke. A front-nine 33 kept him in the lead, but after three bogeys on the back he had to settle for a 71 and a 282 total. Snead overcame two early bogeys with birdies at 5, 6, and 15. After a bogey at 17, Snead needed a birdie on the 72nd hole to tie Worsham and force a playoff the next day. His approach shot left him 18 feet (5.5 m) away, which he rolled in for final-round 70. Locke shot 73 to finish three strokes back, in a tie for third place.

| Place | Player | Score | To par | Money ($) |
|---|---|---|---|---|
| T1 | (United States) Lew Worsham | 70-70-71-71=282 | −2 | Playoff |
| T1 | (United States) Sam Snead | 72-70-70-70=282 | −2 | Playoff |
| T3 | (South Africa) Bobby Locke | 68-74-70-73=285 | +1 | 900 |
| T3 | (United States) Ed Oliver | 73-70-71-71=285 | +1 | 900 |
| 5 | (United States) Bud Ward (a) | 69-72-73-73=287 | +3 | 0 |
| T6 | (United States) Jim Ferrier | 71-70-74-74=289 | +5 | 400 |
| T6 | (United States) Vic Ghezzi | 74-73-73-69=289 | +5 | 400 |
| T6 | (United States) Leland Gibson | 69-76-73-71=289 | +5 | 400 |
| T6 | (United States) Ben Hogan | 70-75-70-74=289 | +5 | 400 |
| T6 | (United States) Johnny Palmer | 72-70-75-72=289 | +5 | 400 |
| T6 | (United States) Paul Runyan | 71-74-72-72=289 | +5 | 400 |

(a) denotes amateur

=== Playoff ===
Sunday, June 15, 1947

In the 18-hole playoff on Sunday morning, Snead led Worsham by two strokes with just three holes remaining. Worsham birdied the par-3 16th with a 28-foot (8.5 m) putt and Snead bogeyed 17 after he missed the fairway and overshot the green from the rough. The match was all-even at the tee of the 90th hole, a par-4 of 419 yards (383 m). Both put lengthy drives in the fairway, and Snead's approach shot stopped pin-high and 15 feet (5 m) left of the hole. Worsham was long and lay 40 feet (12 m) feet past the cup on the apron of the green. His downhill chip hit the hole without dropping, and ended up 29 inches (74 cm) away, leaving Snead his birdie putt for the win. Snead left it well short and as he prepared to hole out in continuation, Worsham called for an official to determine who was further away. With a tape measure, it was determined that it remained Snead's turn, who was visibly flustered with the unnecessary interruption and delay. Snead missed the 30.5-inch (77 cm) putt. Worsham then rolled in his par-saving putt for a 69 and the title, which averted an additional 18-hole playoff in the afternoon.

| Place | Player | Score | To par | Money ($) |
|---|---|---|---|---|
| 1 | (United States) Lew Worsham | 69 | −2 | 2,500 |
| 2 | (United States) Sam Snead | 70 | −1 | 2,000 |

- Prize money includes $500 playoff bonus for each.

==== Scorecard ====
| Hole | 1 | 2 | 3 | 4 | 5 | 6 | 7 | 8 | 9 | 10 | 11 | 12 | 13 | 14 | 15 | 16 | 17 | 18 |
|---|---|---|---|---|---|---|---|---|---|---|---|---|---|---|---|---|---|---|
| Par | 4 | 3 | 3 | 4 | 5 | 4 | 3 | 4 | 5 | 4 | 4 | 3 | 5 | 4 | 5 | 3 | 4 | 4 |
| (United States) Worsham | E | E | E | E | E | E | E | +1 | E | −1 | −1 | −2 | −2 | −2 | −1 | −2 | −2 | −2 |
| (United States) Snead | −1 | −1 | −1 | −1 | −2 | E | E | −1 | −1 | −2 | −2 | −2 | −3 | −3 | −3 | −3 | −2 | −1 |

| Birdie | Bogey | Double bogey |
