= Grand Rapids Open =

Golf tournament

The Grand Rapids Open was a golf tournament played at Cascade Hills Country Club, Grand Rapids, Michigan from 18 to 21 August 1949. The event was won by Jim Ferrier whose score of 25-under-par set a new record for a PGA tournament.

== Winners ==
| Year | Player | Score | To par | Margin of victory | Runner-up | Winner's share ($) | Ref |
|---|---|---|---|---|---|---|---|
| 1949 | (Australia) Jim Ferrier | 263 | −25 | 4 strokes | (United States) Dutch Harrison | 2,600 | |
