= Maryland Open =

Golf tournament

The Maryland Open is the Maryland state open golf tournament, open to both amateur and professional golfers. It is organized by the Maryland State Golf Association. It has been played annually since 1921 at a variety of courses around the state. It was considered a PGA Tour event briefly in the 1920s.

In 2024, the event was won by Alex Hoffman.

== Winners ==
- 2026 William F. Peel IV (a)
- 2025 Benton Weinberg
- 2024 Alex Hoffman
- 2023 Ryan Siegler
- 2022 Evan Katz
- 2021 Jake Griffin (a)
- 2020 Josh Speight
- 2019 Davis Lamb (a)
- 2018 Ryan Cole
- 2017 Brad Miller
- 2016 Sean Bosdosh
- 2015 Denny McCarthy (a)
- 2014 Patrick McCormick (a)
- 2013 Denny McCarthy (a)
- 2012 Sean Bosdosh (a)
- 2011 David Hutsell
- 2010 Denny McCarthy (a)
- 2009 Matt Bassler
- 2008 Chip Sullivan
- 2007 Billy Wingerd
- 2006 Chip Sullivan
- 2005 Wayne DeFrancesco
- 2004 Chip Sullivan
- 2003 Kirk Lombardi (a)
- 2002 Chip Sullivan
- 2001 Steve Madson
- 2000 Dennis Winters
- 1999 Michael Mitchell
- 1998 Keith Unikel
- 1997 Dean Wilson
- 1996 Steve Madsen
- 1995 Wayne DeFrancesco
- 1994 Wayne DeFrancesco
- 1993 Glen Barrett
- 1992 Del Ponchock
- 1991 Jon Stanley
- 1990 Bob Boyd
- 1989 Chris Peddicord
- 1988 Joe Klinchock
- 1987 Fred Funk
- 1986 Marty West
- 1985 Larry Rentz
- 1984 Gary Marlowe
- 1983 Fred Funk
- 1982 Mark Alwin
- 1981 George Graefe
- 1980 Larry Ringer
- 1979 Wheeler Stewart
- 1978 Gary Marlowe
- 1977 Marty West
- 1976 George Graefe
- 1975 Marty West
- 1974 Chris Pigott
- 1973 Henri DeLozier
- 1972 Larry Ringer
- 1971 Doug Ballenger
- 1970 Bill Sporre
- 1969 Dick Whetzle
- 1968 Leo Wykle
- 1967 Leo Wykle
- 1966 Deane Beman (a)
- 1965 Charlie Bassler
- 1964 Paul Haviland
- 1963 Clarence Doser
- 1962 Dick Whetzle
- 1961 Melvin Rowe
- 1960 Lloyd Kelly
- 1959 Walter Romans
- 1958 Charlie Bassler
- 1957 Charlie Bassler
- 1956 Walter Romans
- 1955 Charlie Bassler
- 1954 John O'Donnell
- 1953 Charlie Bassler
- 1952 Jack Isaacs
- 1951 Jack Isaacs
- 1950 Charlie Bassler
- 1949 Jack Isaas
- 1948 Charlie Bassler
- 1947 Spencer Overton
- 1946 Harry Griesmer
- 1945 Lew Worsham
- 1944 Cliff Spencer
- 1943 No tournament
- 1942 Wiffy Cox
- 1941 Bobby Brownell
- 1940 Cliff Spencer
- 1939 John O'Donnell
- 1938 Andy Gibson
- 1937 Cliff Spencer
- 1936 Al Houghton
- 1935 Vic Ghezzi
- 1934 Al Houghton
- 1933 Al Houghton
- 1932 Al Houghton
- 1931 Ralph Beach
- 1930 Glenn Spencer
- 1929 Gene Larkin
- 1928 Bobby Cruickshank
- 1927 Fred McLeod
- 1926 Leo Diegel
- 1925 Charley Betschler
- 1924 Fred A. Savage, Jr.
- 1923 Tom Sasscer
- 1922 B. Warren Corkran
- 1921 D. Clarke Corkran

(a) denotes amateur
