= The National Golf Club of Canada =

Golf club in Woodbridge, Canada

- Location within Southern Ontario
- 43.8085°N 79.5796°W

Club information
- Location: Vaughan, Ontario, Canada
- Total holes: 18
- Website: The National Golf Club of Canada
- Par: 71
- Length: 7,235 yards (6,616 m)

The National Golf Club of Canada is a golf club in Vaughan, Ontario, Canada. It has frequently been called the best golf course in the country, and has been called one of the best golf courses in the world. The club has also been criticized for its men-only membership policy.

== Course ==
The club was founded by Harvey Kalef, Gil Blechman and Irv Hennick. The golf course was designed by George Fazio and Tom Fazio. Construction began on May 15, 1973 and the course officially opened in 1975. The club's first professional was Ken Venturi, a retired professional golfer and later a commentator for CBS Sports. The course is notoriously difficult, and has been called the toughest in Canada. It is also highly acclaimed - the course has been called the best in Canada by a number of reviewers. It also has received acclaim from international publications, where it was ranked among the world's best.

=== Membership ===
Club membership is famously open to men only. The policy came under scrutiny after Augusta National Golf Club abandoned its men-only policy in 2012. The club faced calls to open its membership up to women.
