= Inverness Invitational Four-Ball =

Golf tournament formerly on the PGA Tour

The Inverness Invitational Four-Ball was a golf tournament on the PGA Tour from 1935 to 1953. It was played at the Inverness Club in Toledo, Ohio.

== Format ==
The tournament featured an unusual team round robin format. From 1935 to 1951, the field consisted of eight two-man teams. They would play seven rounds totalling 126 holes in four-ball format. A team earned or lost points on each hole, in a match play style, based on their score versus the opposing team for that round. A team scored "+1" for each hole won and "−1" for each hole lost. The teams were shuffled after every round so that every team played one round against every other team. The team with the most points after seven rounds won.

In 1952, the field was six teams and they played over five rounds for a total of 90 holes.

In 1953, the format shifted to traditional 72-hole stroke play with a field of 30 players.

The women's invitational replaced the men's event in 1954.

== Winners ==
Inverness Invitational

- 1953 Jack Burke Jr.

Inverness Invitational Four-Ball

- 1952 Jim Ferrier and Sam Snead
- 1951 Roberto De Vicenzo and Henry Ransom
- 1950 Jim Ferrier and Sam Snead
- 1949 Bob Hamilton and Chick Harbert
- 1948 Jimmy Demaret and Ben Hogan
- 1947 Jimmy Demaret and Ben Hogan
- 1946 Jimmy Demaret and Ben Hogan
- 1943–1945 No tournaments staged due to World War II
- 1942 Lawson Little and Lloyd Mangrum
- 1941 Jimmy Demaret and Ben Hogan
- 1940 Ralph Guldahl and Sam Snead
- 1939 Henry Picard and Johnny Revolta
- 1938 Vic Ghezzi and Sam Snead
- 1937 Harry Cooper and Horton Smith
- 1936 Walter Hagen and Ky Laffoon
- 1935 Henry Picard and Johnny Revolta
