= Denny McCarthy =

American professional golfer (born 1993)

Personal information
- Full name: Denny Francis McCarthy
- Nationality: United States
- Born: March 4, 1993 (age 33) Takoma Park, Maryland, U.S.
- Height: 5 ft 9 in (1.75 m)
- Weight: 165 lb (75 kg; 11.8 st)
- Spouse: Samantha McCarthy

Career
- Sport: Golf
- College: University of Virginia
- Turned professional: 2015
- Current tour: PGA Tour
- Former tour: Web.com Tour
- Professional wins: 4
- Highest ranking: 29 (May 12, 2024) (as of October 25, 2026)

Number of wins by tour
- Korn Ferry Tour: 1
- Other: 3

Best results in major championships
- Masters Tournament: T29: 2025
- PGA Championship: T8: 2025
- U.S. Open: T7: 2022
- The Open Championship: CUT: 2023, 2024, 2025

Achievements and awards
- Web.com Tour Finals money list winner: 2018

Denny Francis McCarthy (born March 4, 1993) is an American professional golfer who plays on the PGA Tour.

== Amateur career ==
McCarthy was born in Takoma Park, Maryland. He played competitively on the junior golf circuit beginning at the age of 10, finding a lot of success on the MAPGA junior tour. He played varsity golf and basketball at Georgetown Preparatory School. He played college golf at the University of Virginia where he was a two-time All-American.

McCarthy played on the 2010 Junior Ryder Cup team along with Jordan Spieth, Justin Thomas, and Ollie Schniederjans.

While he was a senior at UVA, McCarthy led the United States to victory in the 2014 World Amateur Team Championship (Eisenhower Trophy) along with Beau Hossler and Bryson DeChambeau. He posted a final round 8-under 64 while being the only American to shoot in the 60s all four days. He finished the tournament 5th overall.

In 2015, he was selected to play on the U.S. Walker Cup team where he played team matches with his former Eisenhower Trophy teammate, Beau Hossler. His 2015 Porter Cup win and clutch play to help take home the Eisenhower Trophy earned him a spot on the team.

McCarthy won the Maryland Amateur twice (2013 and 2014) and the Maryland Open three times (2010, 2013, and 2015).

McCarthy finished tied for 42nd at the 2015 U.S. Open.

== Professional career ==
After playing in the 2015 Walker Cup, McCarthy turned pro and played on the Web.com Tour for the 2016 season. He finished the 2016 season with seven top-25 finishes including two top-10s in 21 events. He finished the year outside the top-25 and would remain on the Web.com Tour for the following season. In 2017, he finished with nine top-25 finishes including four top-10s in 22 events. After finishing outside the top-25 in the regular season, he locked up his PGA Tour card in the Web.com Tour Finals. McCarthy almost had his first PGA victory in April 2024 at the Valero Texas Open, he birdied the last seven holes to force a playoff, he lost in the playoff to Akshay Bhatia.

== Personal life ==
McCarthy has a brother and two sisters. Brother Ryan played college golf at Loyola University Maryland. Sister Cristina played college lacrosse at James Madison University and Georgetown University and sister Michaela played lacrosse at Virginia Tech.

McCarthy is also a cousin of comedian Greg Fitzsimmons.

== Amateur wins ==
- 2010 Maryland Boys Junior Amateur, Junior PGA Championship
- 2011 Maryland Boys Junior Amateur
- 2012 Northern Intercollegiate
- 2013 Kenridge Invitational, Maryland State Amateur
- 2014 Jim West Intercollegiate (tie), Maryland State Amateur
- 2015 Porter Cup

== Professional wins (4) ==
=== Web.com Tour wins (1) ===
Legend
Finals events (1)
Other Web.com Tour (0)

No.	Date	Tournament	Winning score	Margin of victory	Runner-up
1	Sep 23, 2018	Web.com Tour Championship	−23 (64-65-67-65=261)	4 strokes	(United States) Lucas Glover

=== Other wins (3) ===
- 2010 Maryland Open (as an amateur)
- 2013 Maryland Open (as an amateur)
- 2015 Maryland Open (as an amateur)

== Playoff record ==
PGA Tour playoff record (0–2)

No.	Year	Tournament	Opponent	Result
1	2023	Memorial Tournament	(Norway) Viktor Hovland	Lost to par on first extra hole
2	2024	Valero Texas Open	(United States) Akshay Bhatia	Lost to birdie on first extra hole

== Results in major championships ==
Results not in chronological order in 2020.

Tournament	2015	2016	2017	2018
Masters Tournament				
U.S. Open	T42	CUT		
The Open Championship				
PGA Championship				

Tournament	2019	2020	2021	2022	2023	2024	2025	2026
Masters Tournament						T45	T29	
PGA Championship		T58	T59	T48	T29	CUT	T8	T44
U.S. Open				T7	T20	T32	T57	
The Open Championship		NT			CUT	CUT	CUT	

Top 10
Did not play

CUT = missed the half-way cut
"T" indicates a tie for a place
NT = no tournament due to COVID-19 pandemic

=== Summary ===
Tournament	Wins	2nd	3rd	Top-5	Top-10	Top-25	Events	Cuts made
Masters Tournament	0	0	0	0	0	0	2	2
PGA Championship	0	0	0	0	1	1	7	6
U.S. Open	0	0	0	0	1	2	6	5
The Open Championship	0	0	0	0	0	0	3	0
Totals	0	0	0	0	2	3	18	13

- Most consecutive cuts made – 6 (2020 PGA Championship – 2023 U.S. Open)
- Longest streak of top-10s – 1 (twice)

== Results in The Players Championship ==
Tournament	2019	2020	2021	2022	2023	2024	2025	2026
The Players Championship	T41	C	T55	T60	T13	T35	T14	CUT

CUT = missed the halfway cut
"T" indicates a tie for a place
C = canceled after the first round due to the COVID-19 pandemic

== Results in World Golf Championships ==
Tournament	2023
Match Play	T52

"T" = Tied

== U.S. national team appearances ==
Amateur

- Junior Ryder Cup: 2010 (winners)
- Eisenhower Trophy: 2014 (winners)
- Walker Cup: 2015

== See also ==
- 2017 Web.com Tour Finals graduates
- 2018 Web.com Tour Finals graduates
