= Oakland Open =

American golf tournament

Coordinates: 37.766°N 122.134°W

Tournament information
- Location: Oakland, California
- Established: 1937
- Course: Sequoyah Country Club
- Par: 70
- Length: 5,912 yards (5,406 m)
- Tour: PGA Tour
- Prize fund: $7,500
- Final year: 1944

Final champion
- (Australia) Jim Ferrier

Location in the United States
Location in California

The Oakland Open was a golf tournament in California on the PGA Tour from 1937 to 1944. It was played in Oakland at the Claremont Country Club in 1937 and at the Sequoyah Country Club from 1938 to 1944.

At age 25, Ben Hogan was nearly broke and on the verge of quitting the tour in early 1938; he finished sixth at the Oakland Open in late January and continued.

== Winners ==
- 1944 Jim Ferrier
- 1943 No tournament
- 1942 Byron Nelson
- 1941 Leonard Dodson
- 1940 Jimmy Demaret
- 1939 Dick Metz
- 1938 Harry Cooper
- 1937 Sam Snead
