= David Hutsell =

American professional golfer (born 1970)

David Hutsell (born August 21, 1970) is an American professional golfer and teaching pro.

Hutsell was born in Fort Meade, Maryland. He turned pro in 1993. He resides in Baltimore, Maryland, and was the Head Pro at Pine Ridge Golf Club until 2022. He now is a teaching professional at Baltimore Country Club.

Hutsell has participated in two majors, the 2010 and 2011 PGA Championships. He failed to make the cut in either tournament.

Hutsell won the 2011 PGA Professional National Championship. He won a three-man playoff on the second extra hole.

In July 2011, Hutsell won the Maryland Open, at Maryland Golf and Country Club. He shot a 70 and a 72 the first two days. He finished the final round shooting a 65 and winning the tournament by one stroke. He also set the Maryland Golf and Country Club course record. He finished the tournament at 9 under.

== Professional wins ==
- 2010 Middle Atlantic PGA Championship
- 2011 PGA Professional National Championship, Maryland Open, Middle Atlantic PGA Championship
- 2015 Middle Atlantic PGA Championship
- 2025 Middle Atlantic PGA Championship

== U.S. national team appearances ==
- PGA Cup: 2011 (winners)
