= Fountainhead-Orchard Hills, Maryland =

- CDP
- Location of Fountainhead-Orchard Hills, Maryland
- Coordinates: 39°41′16″N 77°43′02″W
- Country: United States
- State: Maryland
- County: Washington

Area
  - Total: 4.42 sq mi (11.44 km^{2})
  - Land: 4.42 sq mi (11.44 km^{2})
  - Water: 0 sq mi (0.00 km^{2})
- Elevation: 643 ft (196 m)

Population (2020)
  - Total: 6,189
  - Density: 1,401.3/sq mi (541.06/km^{2})
- Time zone: UTC−5 (Eastern (EST))
  - Summer (DST): UTC−4 (EDT)
- FIPS code: 24-29712
- GNIS feature ID: 2389807

Fountainhead-Orchard Hills is a census-designated place (CDP) in Washington County, Maryland, United States. The population was 3,861 at the 2000 census.

== Geography ==
According to the United States Census Bureau, the CDP has a total area of 3.8 square miles (9.8 km^{2}), all land.

== Demographics ==
Historical population
Census	Pop.	Note	%±
2020	6,189		—
U.S. Decennial Census

=== 2020 census ===
As of the 2020 census, Fountainhead-Orchard Hills had a population of 6,189. The median age was 42.6 years. 22.8% of residents were under the age of 18 and 19.3% of residents were 65 years of age or older. For every 100 females there were 97.3 males, and for every 100 females age 18 and over there were 91.2 males age 18 and over.

99.7% of residents lived in urban areas, while 0.3% lived in rural areas.

There were 2,354 households in Fountainhead-Orchard Hills, of which 31.4% had children under the age of 18 living in them. Of all households, 55.1% were married-couple households, 14.5% were households with a male householder and no spouse or partner present, and 22.6% were households with a female householder and no spouse or partner present. About 24.3% of all households were made up of individuals and 12.1% had someone living alone who was 65 years of age or older.

There were 2,490 housing units, of which 5.5% were vacant. The homeowner vacancy rate was 1.7% and the rental vacancy rate was 6.1%.

Racial composition as of the 2020 census
Race	Number	Percent
White	4,572	73.9%
Black or African American	581	9.4%
American Indian and Alaska Native	31	0.5%
Asian	255	4.1%
Native Hawaiian and Other Pacific Islander	0	0.0%
Some other race	234	3.8%
Two or more races	516	8.3%
Hispanic or Latino (of any race)	536	8.7%

=== 2000 census ===
At the 2000 census there were 3,844 people, 1,546 households, and 1,119 families living in the CDP. The population density was 1,007.3 inhabitants per square mile (388.9/km^{2}). There were 1,621 housing units at an average density of 424.8 per square mile (164.0/km^{2}). The racial makeup of the CDP was 94.35% White, 2.29% African American, 0.10% Native American, 1.90% Asian, 0.03% Pacific Islander, 0.31% from other races, and 1.01% from two or more races. Hispanic or Latino of any race were 1.59%.

Of the 1,546 households 27.7% had children under the age of 18 living with them, 62.8% were married couples living together, 6.5% had a female householder with no husband present, and 27.6% were non-families. 23.9% of households were one person and 14.9% were one person aged 65 or older. The average household size was 2.40 and the average family size was 2.81.

The age distribution was 21.6% under the age of 18, 4.6% from 18 to 24, 22.8% from 25 to 44, 27.3% from 45 to 64, and 23.7% 65 or older. The median age was 46 years. For every 100 females, there were 93.7 males. For every 100 females age 18 and over, there were 90.0 males.

The median household income was $49,648 and the median family income was $60,840. Males had a median income of $38,636 versus $26,905 for females. The per capita income for the CDP was $27,552. About 1.7% of families and 3.1% of the population were below the poverty line, including 2.5% of those under age 18 and 2.7% of those age 65 or over.
