= Edgewood Tahoe Resort =

Golf resort in Stateline, Nevada

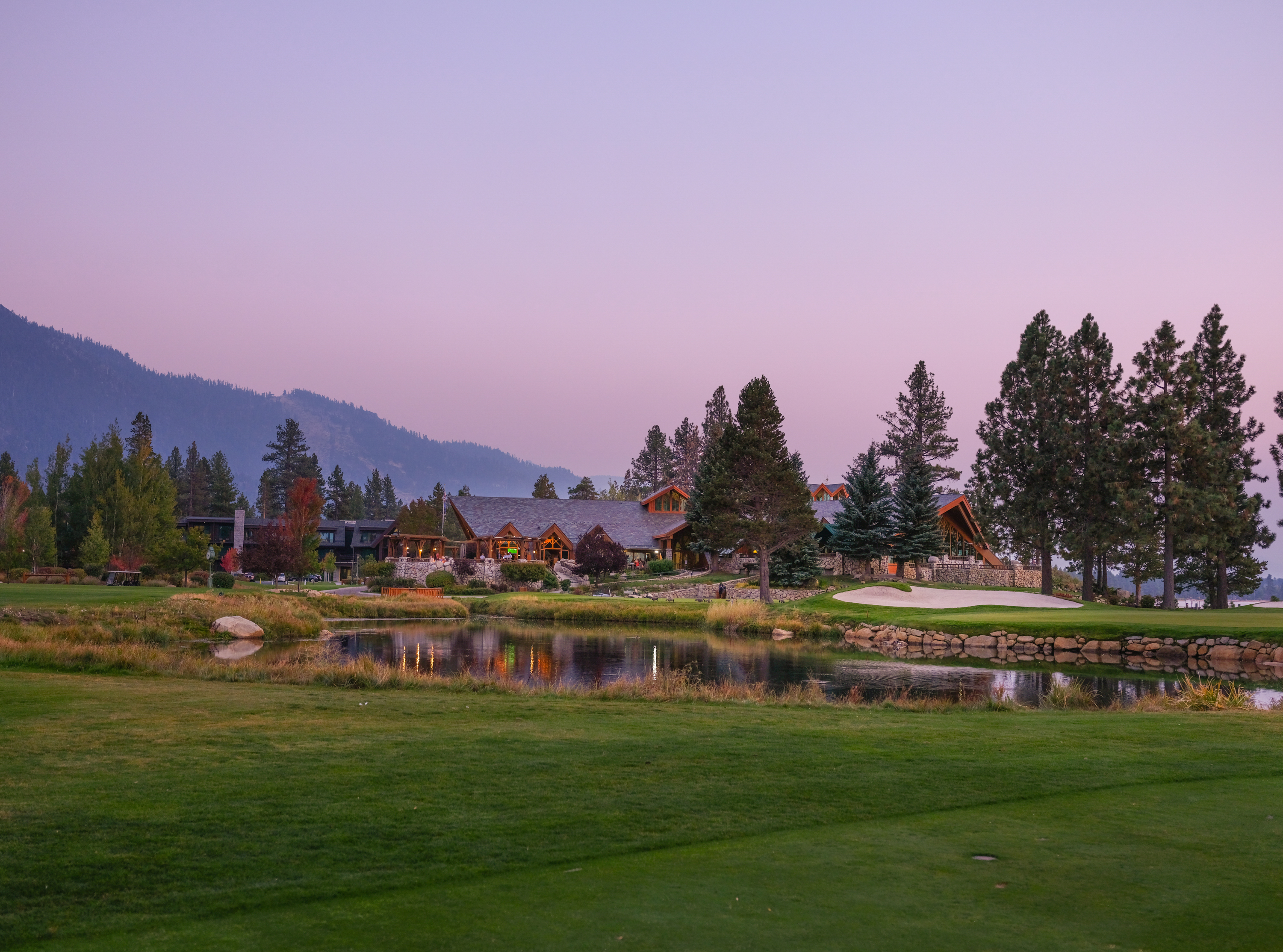
- Edgewood Tahoe Resort in October 2020
- Interactive map of Edgewood Tahoe Resort
- 38°58′05″N 119°56′46″W

Club information
- Location: 180 Lake Parkway, Stateline
- Elevation: 6,240 feet (1,900 m)
- Established: 1968; 58 years ago
- Tota holes: 18
- Tournaments: U.S. Public Links Championship (1980); U.S. Senior Open (1985); American Century Championship (1990–present)
- Website: Official website

Edgewood Tahoe Golf Course
- Designed by: George Fazio and Tom Fazio (periodic renovations)
- Par: 72
- Length: 7,379 yards (6,747 m)
- Course rating: 75.5
- Slope rating: 145

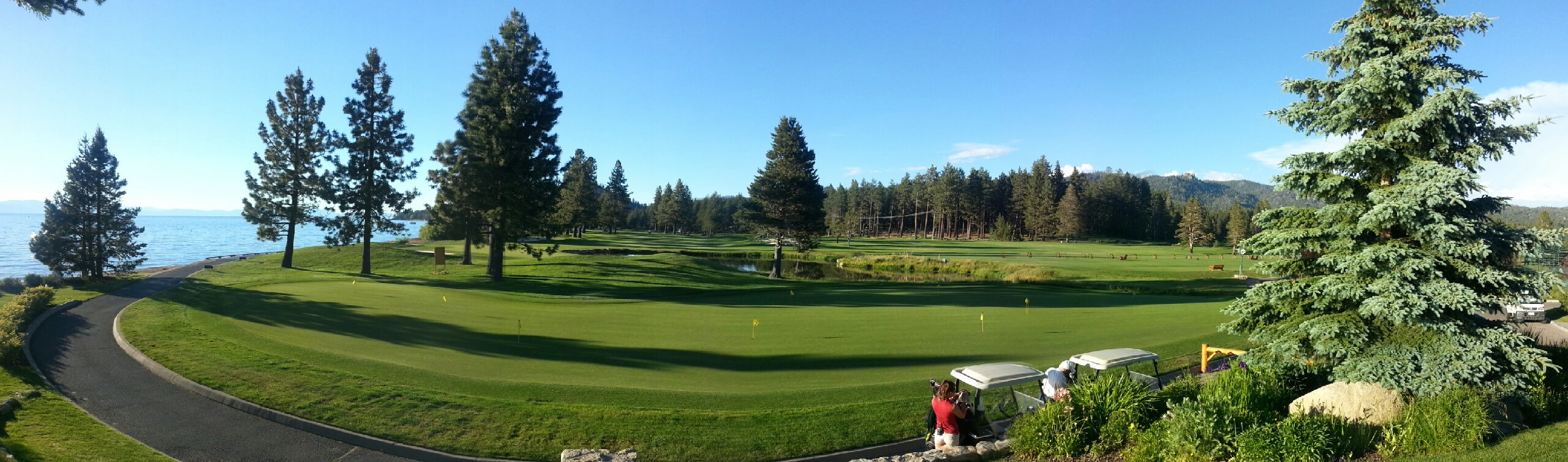
The golf course at Edgewood Tahoe Resort in July 2013

The Edgewood Tahoe Resort is a golf resort in the western United States, on the south shore of Lake Tahoe in Stateline, Nevada. The venue has hosted the 1985 U.S. Senior Open and the annual American Century Championship since 1990.

The site where Edgewood now stands was previously part of a ranch adjacent to Friday's Station, the historic 19th Century Pony Express station and inn. The Park family bought the ranch in 1896 to raise cattle, and in the 1960s they decided to build a golf course on their property. The golf course was originally designed by George Fazio and opened in 1968. George's nephew Tom Fazio has since renovated the now 7,379-yard (6,747 m) course from time to time.

The resort hosted the NHL Outdoors at Lake Tahoe series on February 20–21, 2021. The Colorado Avalanche defeated the Vegas Golden Knights 3-2 on February 20, and the Boston Bruins defeated the Philadelphia Flyers 7-3 the next day. The series served as a replacement for the Winter Classic and Stadium Series for that season, both which were cancelled due to the COVID-19 pandemic.

== Scorecard ==
Edgewood Tahoe Golf Course
Tee	Rating/Slope	1	2	3	4	5	6	7	8	9	Out	10	11	12	13	14	15	16	17	18	In	Total
Gold	75.5/145	436	417	599	572	220	472	169	466	430	3781	441	407	214	434	447	462	564	207	572	3748	7529
Blue	73.0/140	402	393	575	520	188	398	161	430	417	3484	413	372	187	425	406	394	547	175	501	3420	6904
White	69.9/134	370	362	532	488	152	368	149	382	380	3183	383	328	167	387	388	341	533	140	489	3156	6339
Red	71.0/133	343	322	413	378	107	309	112	325	342	2651	353	259	127	315	334	309	415	107	437	2692	5343
Par		4	4	5	5	3	4	3	4	4	36	4	4	3	4	4	4	5	3	5	36	72
SI	Men's	11	15	1	9	13	3	17	5	7		6	10	12	4	2	16	8	18	14
SI	Women's	7	13	3	11	17	1	15	5	9		4	16	12	2	8	14	6	18	10
