= Lew Worsham =

American professional golfer

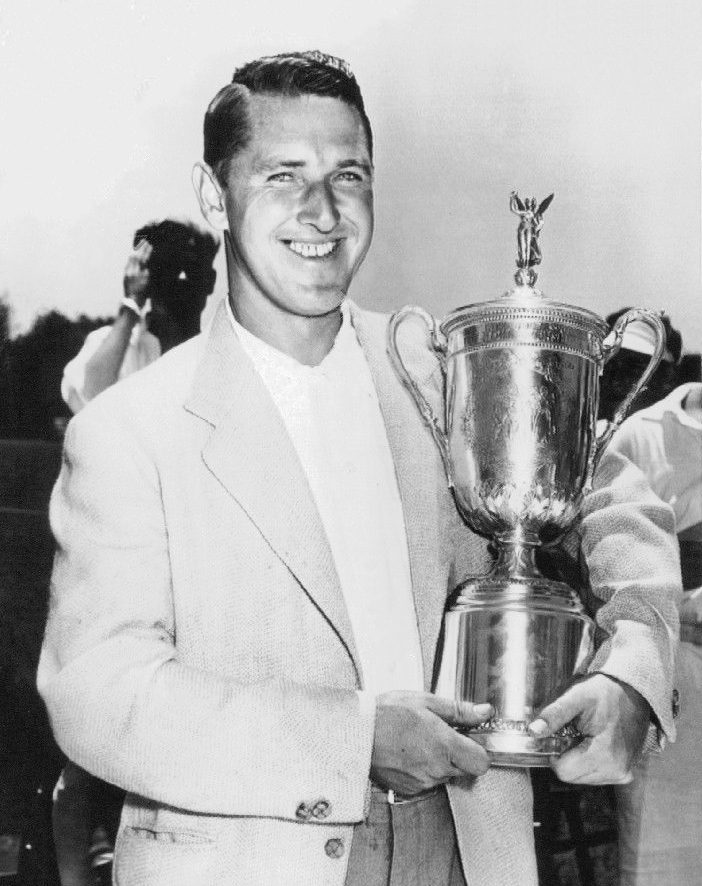
- Worsham after winning the 1947 U.S. Open

Personal information
- Full name: Lewis Elmer Worsham Jr.
- Nationality: United States
- Born: October 5, 1917 Pittsylvania County, Virginia, U.S.
- Died: October 19, 1990 (aged 73) Poquoson, Virginia, U.S.

Career
- Sport: Golf
- Turned professional: 1935
- Former tour: PGA Tour
- Professional wins: 13

Number of wins by tour
- PGA Tour: 6
- Other: 7

Best results in major championships (wins: 1)
- Masters Tournament: 6th: 1949
- PGA Championship: T5: 1947, 1955
- U.S. Open: Won: 1947
- The Open Championship: DNP

Achievements and awards
- PGA Tour leading money winner: 1953

Lew Worsham
- Military career
- Allegiance: United States
- Branch: United States Navy
- Service years: 1943–1945
- Units: United States Naval Training Center Bainbridge, Maryland
- Conflicts: World War II

Lewis Elmer Worsham, Jr. (October 5, 1917 – October 19, 1990) was an American professional golfer, the U.S. Open champion in 1947.

== Early life ==
Worsham was born on October 5, 1917, in Pittsylvania County, Virginia. He grew up in Long Island, Virginia. Worsham attended Hampton High School and was a member of the golf team from 1933 to 1935. He served in the United States Navy during World War II.

== Professional career ==
Worsham won the U.S. Open in 1947 by defeating Sam Snead by a stroke in an 18-hole playoff at the St. Louis Country Club in Clayton, Missouri. This was the first U.S. Open to be televised locally and the winner's share was $2,000. In July 1947, Worsham appeared on the cover of Golfing magazine. In 1953, he led the PGA Tour money list with $34,002 in earnings. That same year he won the first golf tournament to be broadcast nationally in the United States and golf's first $100,000 tournament, the Tam O'Shanter World Championship of Golf, in spectacular fashion. He holed out a wedge from 104 yards for an eagle-2 to win over Chandler Harper by one shot.

Worsham made his only Ryder Cup appearance in 1947 and won both of his matches. Like most tour players of his generation, he earned his living primarily as a club professional, and was the longtime pro at Oakmont Country Club, northeast of Pittsburgh, Pennsylvania.

== Personal life ==
Worsham married Virginia. He had one daughter and two sons: Lynda, Richard L and Thomas E.

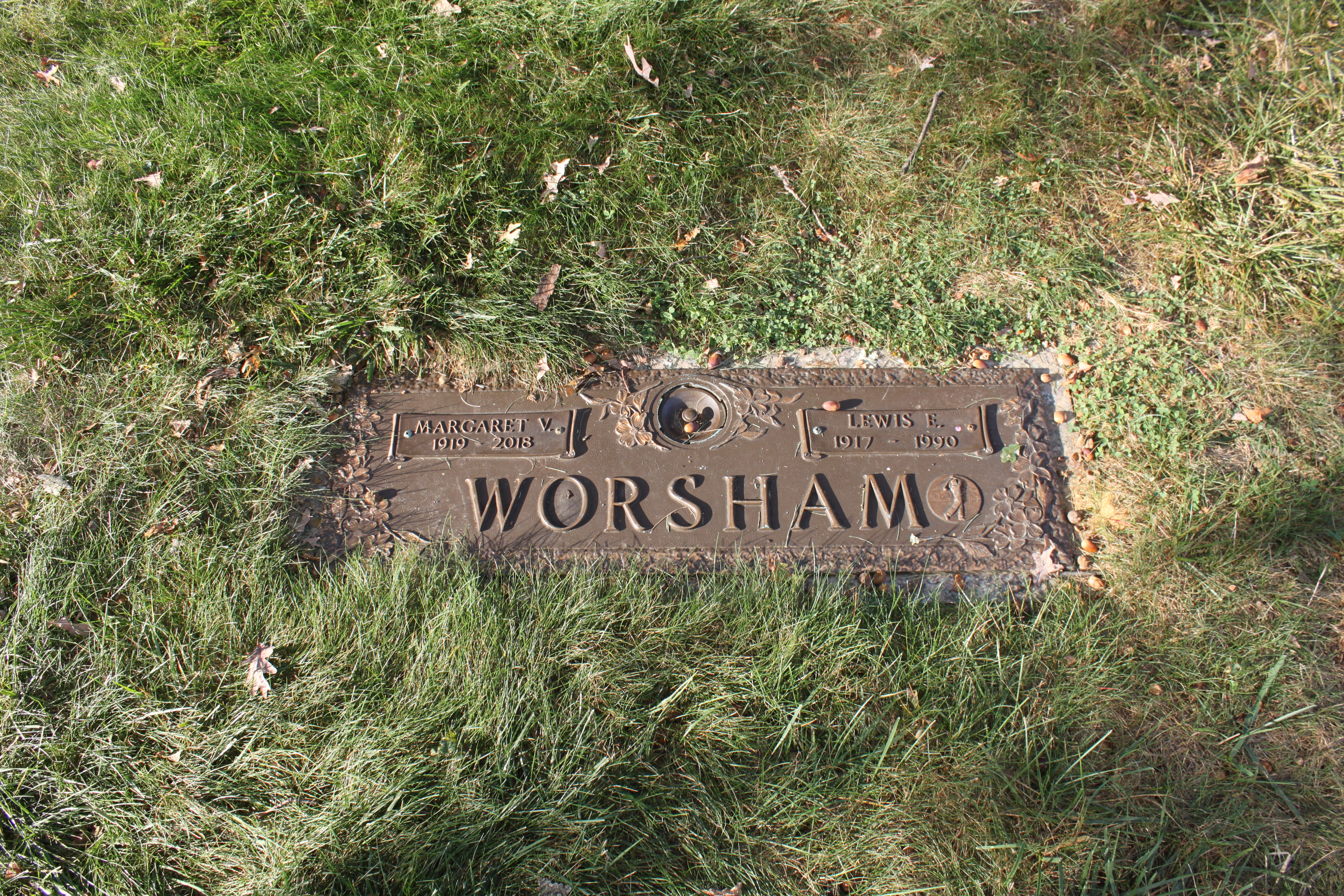
Grave of Worsham and his wife in Columbia Gardens Cemetery

Worsham died on October 19, 1990, at age, 73 in Poquoson, Virginia. He is buried at Columbia Gardens Cemetery in Arlington, Virginia.

== Awards and honors ==
- Worsham was honored as the "Sportsperson of the Year" for 1953 by Pittsburgh's Dapper Dan Charities.
- He was inducted into the PGA of America Hall of Fame in 2017.

== Professional wins (13) ==
=== PGA Tour wins (6) ===
- 1946 Atlanta Invitational
- 1947 **U.S. Open**, Denver Open
- 1951 Phoenix Open
- 1953 Jacksonville Open, World Championship of Golf

Major championship is shown in bold.

=== Other wins (7) ===
- 1942 Middle Atlantic PGA Championship
- 1945 Maryland Open
- 1946 Middle Atlantic PGA Championship
- 1947 Middle Atlantic PGA Championship
- 1948 Cavalier Specialists Invitational
- 1952 Miami Beach International Four-Ball (with Ted Kroll)
- 1961 Tri-State PGA Championship

== Major championships ==
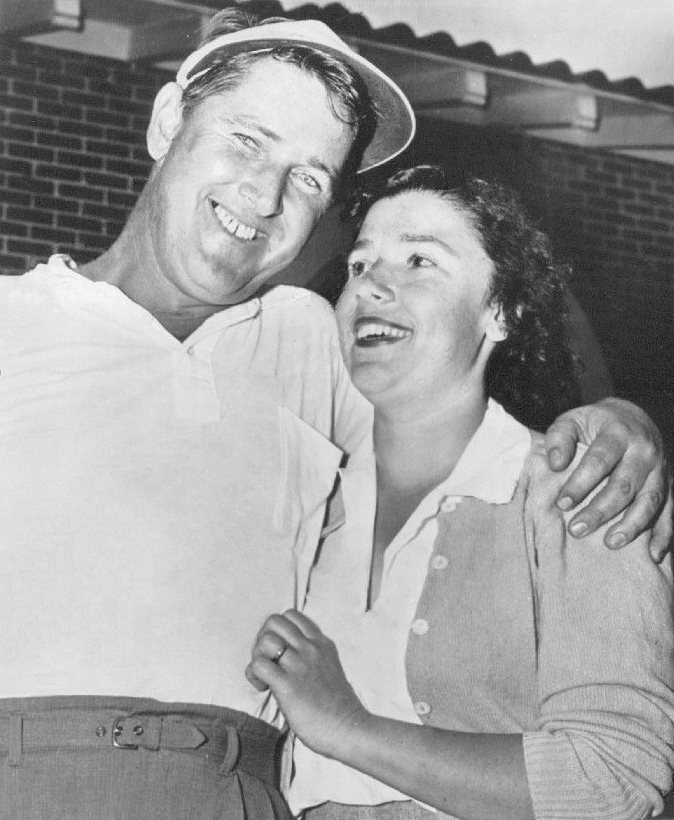
Worsham with wife after winning the 1953 Greater Jacksonville Open

=== Wins (1) ===
Year	Championship	54 holes	Winning score	Margin	Runner-up
1947	U.S. Open	1 shot lead	−2 (70-70-71-71=282)	Playoff ^{1}	(United States) Sam Snead

^{1} Defeated Snead in an 18-hole playoff - Worsham 69 (−2), Snead 70 (−1).

=== Results timeline ===
Tournament	1938	1939
Masters Tournament		
U.S. Open	WD	
PGA Championship		

Tournament	1940	1941	1942	1943	1944	1945	1946	1947	1948	1949
Masters Tournament				NT	NT	NT		T33	T30	6
U.S. Open	CUT	CUT	NT	NT	NT	NT	T22	**1**	6	T27
PGA Championship				NT			R32	QF	R16	R16

Tournament	1950	1951	1952	1953	1954	1955	1956	1957	1958	1959
Masters Tournament	T42	T3	T7	44	T12	T49	T34	CUT	CUT	CUT
U.S. Open	CUT	T14	T7	CUT	T23	CUT	CUT	T38	T45	
PGA Championship	R32	R32	R32	R64		QF	R16			

Tournament	1960	1961	1962	1963
Masters Tournament	44	T22	T29	
U.S. Open		CUT		
PGA Championship		T37	CUT	CUT

Note: Worsham never played in The Open Championship.

Win
Top 10
Did not play

NT = No tournament
CUT = missed the half-way cut
WD = Withdrew
R64, R32, R16, QF, SF = Round in which player lost in PGA Championship match play
"T" = tied

=== Summary ===
Tournament	Wins	2nd	3rd	Top-5	Top-10	Top-25	Events	Cuts made
Masters Tournament	0	0	1	1	3	5	16	13
U.S. Open	1	0	0	1	3	6	17	9
The Open Championship	0	0	0	0	0	0	0	0
PGA Championship	0	0	0	2	5	9	11	11
Totals	1	0	1	4	11	20	44	33

- Most consecutive cuts made – 12 (1946 U.S. Open – 1950 Masters)
- Longest streak of top-10s – 3 (1948 U.S. Open – 1949 Masters)
