= George Fazio =

Professional golfer, golf course architect (1912–1986)

Personal information
- Nationality: United States
- Born: November 12, 1912 Philadelphia, Pennsylvania, U.S.
- Died: June 6, 1986 (aged 73) Jupiter, Florida, U.S.

Career
- Sport: Golf
- Status: Professional
- Former tour: PGA Tour
- Professional wins: 10

Number of wins by tour
- PGA Tour: 2
- Other: 8

Best results in major championships
- Masters Tournament: T14: 1952
- PGA Championship: T5: 1948
- U.S. Open: 3rd: 1950
- The Open Championship: DNP

George Fazio (November 12, 1912 – June 6, 1986) was an American professional golfer and a golf course architect.

== Career ==
Fazio was born in Philadelphia, Pennsylvania, was a respected player in the mid-twentieth century and competed in seven Masters Tournaments from 1947 to 1954. His best finish was 14th in 1952.

Fazio won one PGA Tour event, the 1946 Canadian Open. He also won the 1947 Bing Crosby Pro-Am (in a tie with Ed Furgol). He had career earnings of more than $50,000. He nearly won the 1950 U.S. Open at Merion Golf Club outside Philadelphia, finishing third to Ben Hogan and Lloyd Mangrum in an 18-hole playoff. This event was recently memorialized as one of the 15 most memorable Philadelphia sports moments. Like most golfers of his generation, Fazio earned his living primarily as a club pro during his regular career years. During the 1940s, he was head pro at Hillcrest Country Club in Los Angeles, where many of Hollywood's celebrities played.

After his playing days were over, Fazio went on to become a well-known golf course architect along with his nephews Tom Fazio, Jim Fazio, and course designer Lou Cappelli. The foursome built many notable courses, and they are particularly noted for the shapes built into their traps - such as clover-leaves and butterflies.

== Personal life ==
Fazio died in Jupiter, Florida at the age of 73.

== Professional wins (10) ==
=== PGA Tour wins (1) ===
- 1946 Canadian Open

=== Other wins (9) ===
this list may be incomplete

- 1941 Philadelphia PGA Championship
- 1945 California State Open
- 1947 Bing Crosby Pro-Am (tie with Ed Furgol)
- 1949 Philadelphia Open Championship
- 1950 Middle Atlantic PGA Championship
- 1952 Philadelphia Open Championship
- 1956 Philadelphia Open Championship
- 1958 Philadelphia Open Championship
- 1959 Philadelphia Open Championship

== Results in major championships ==
Tournament	1938	1939	1940	1941	1942	1943	1944	1945	1946	1947	1948	1949
Masters Tournament						NT	NT	NT		T39		T30
U.S. Open	WD	CUT		WD	NT	NT	NT	NT	T38	T59	T25	T35
PGA Championship			R64	R32		NT			R32		QF	R32

Tournament	1950	1951	1952	1953	1954	1955	1956	1957	1958	1959	1960
Masters Tournament	T21	T18	T14	T51	T33						
U.S. Open	3	CUT	5	T4	T27			CUT		WD	
PGA Championship	R32	R64		R64		R64		R64	T25	T56	CUT

Note: Fazio never played in The Open Championship.

Top 10
Did not play

NT = no tournament
WD = withdrew
CUT = missed the half-way cut
R64, R32, R16, QF, SF = round in which player lost in PGA Championship match play
"T" indicates a tie for a place

=== Summary ===
Tournament	Wins	2nd	3rd	Top-5	Top-10	Top-25	Events	Cuts made
Masters Tournament	0	0	0	0	0	3	7	7
U.S. Open	0	0	1	3	3	4	14	8
The Open Championship	0	0	0	0	0	0	0	0
PGA Championship	0	0	0	1	1	6	13	12
Totals	0	0	1	4	4	13	34	27

- Most consecutive cuts made – 14 (1941 PGA – 1951 Masters)
- Longest streak of top-10s – 1 (four times)

== Notable golf course designs ==
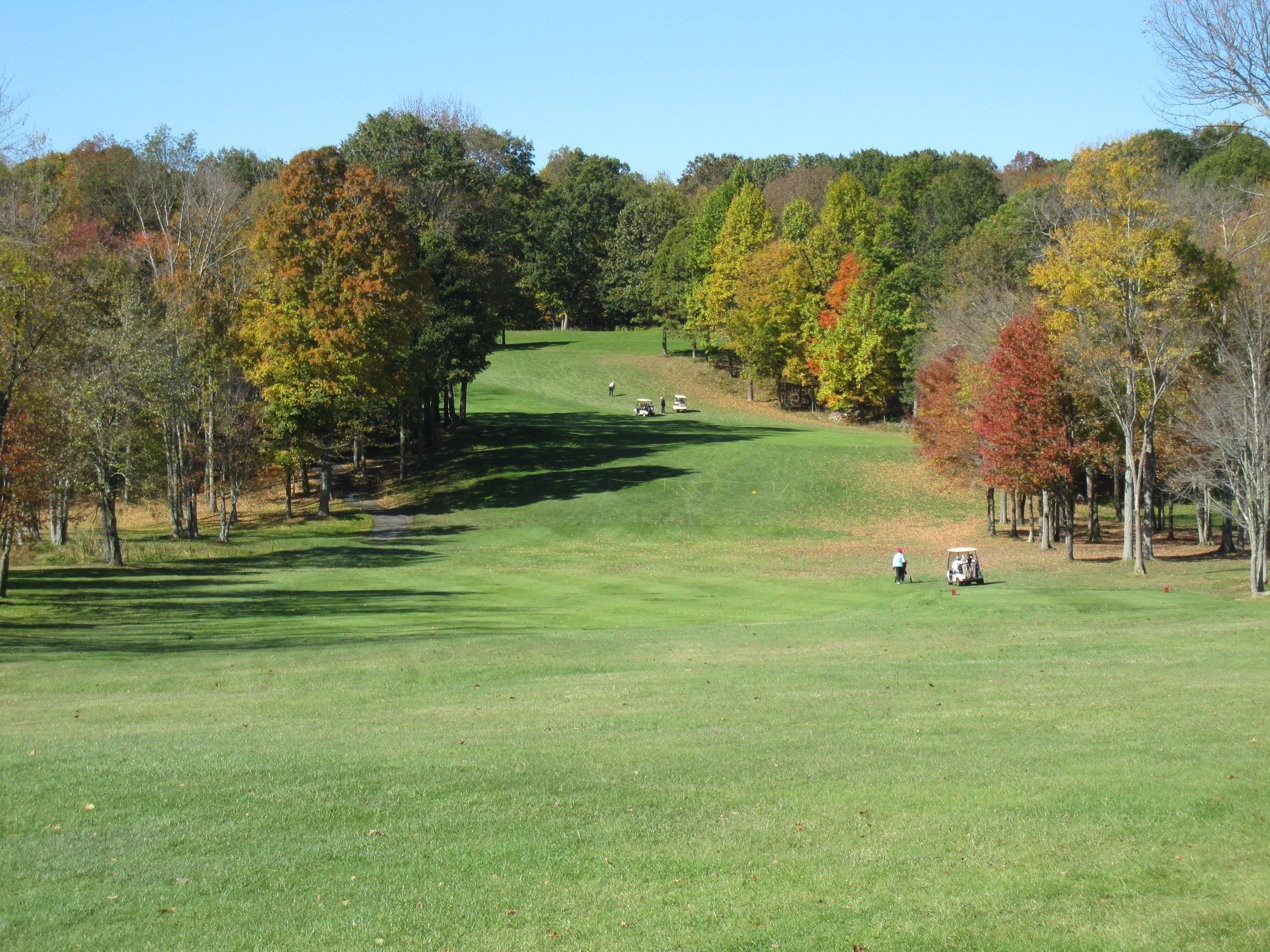
Ridgefield Golf Course 6th Tee Box (men's)

The following is a partial list of courses designed by Fazio:

- OD denotes courses for which Fazio is the original designer
- R denotes courses reconstructed by Fazio
- A denotes courses for which Fazio made substantial additions
- E denotes courses that Fazio examined and on the construction of which he consulted

Name	Contribution	Year built	City / Town	State / Province	Country	Comments
Ridgefield GC	OD		Ridgefield	Connecticut	United States	
Jupiter Hills (Hills Course, Village Course)	OD		Tequesta	Florida	United States	
PGA National GC (The Haig, The Squires)	OD		Palm Beach Gardens	Florida	United States	
Turtle Bay Resort	OD		Kahuku (Oahu)	Hawaii	United States	
Butler National GC	OD		Oak Brook	Illinois	United States	
Wollaston GC	OD		Milton	Massachusetts	United States	
Edgewood Tahoe Resort	OD		Zephyr Cove	Nevada	United States	
Atlantis GC	OD		Little Egg Harbor Township	New Jersey	United States	
Pinehurst Resort No. 6	OD		Pinehurst	North Carolina	United States	
Chester Valley GC	OD		Malvern	Pennsylvania	United States	
Downingtown CC	OD		Downingtown	Pennsylvania	United States	
Hershey CC	OD		Hershey	Pennsylvania	United States	
Moselem Springs GC	OD		Fleetwood	Pennsylvania	United States	
Squires GC	OD		Ambler	Pennsylvania	United States	
Waynesborough CC	OD		Paoli	Pennsylvania	United States	
George Fazio GC	OD		Hilton Head Island	South Carolina	United States	
Moss Creek GC (Devil's Elbow South Course)	OD		Hilton Head Island	South Carolina	United States	
Champions GC (Jackrabbit Course)	OD		Houston	Texas	United States	
The National Golf Club of Canada	OD		Woodbridge	Ontario	Canada	
Cariari CC	OD		San José	Heredia	Costa Rica	
Coronado GC	OD		Nueva Gorgona	Panamá Oeste	Panama	
Great Gorge Golf Club (Lake, Quarry & Rail)	OD	1970	Vernon Township	New Jersey	United States	Designed for Hugh Hefner for the original Great Gorge Playboy Club
