= Jimmy Demaret =

American professional golfer (1910–1983)

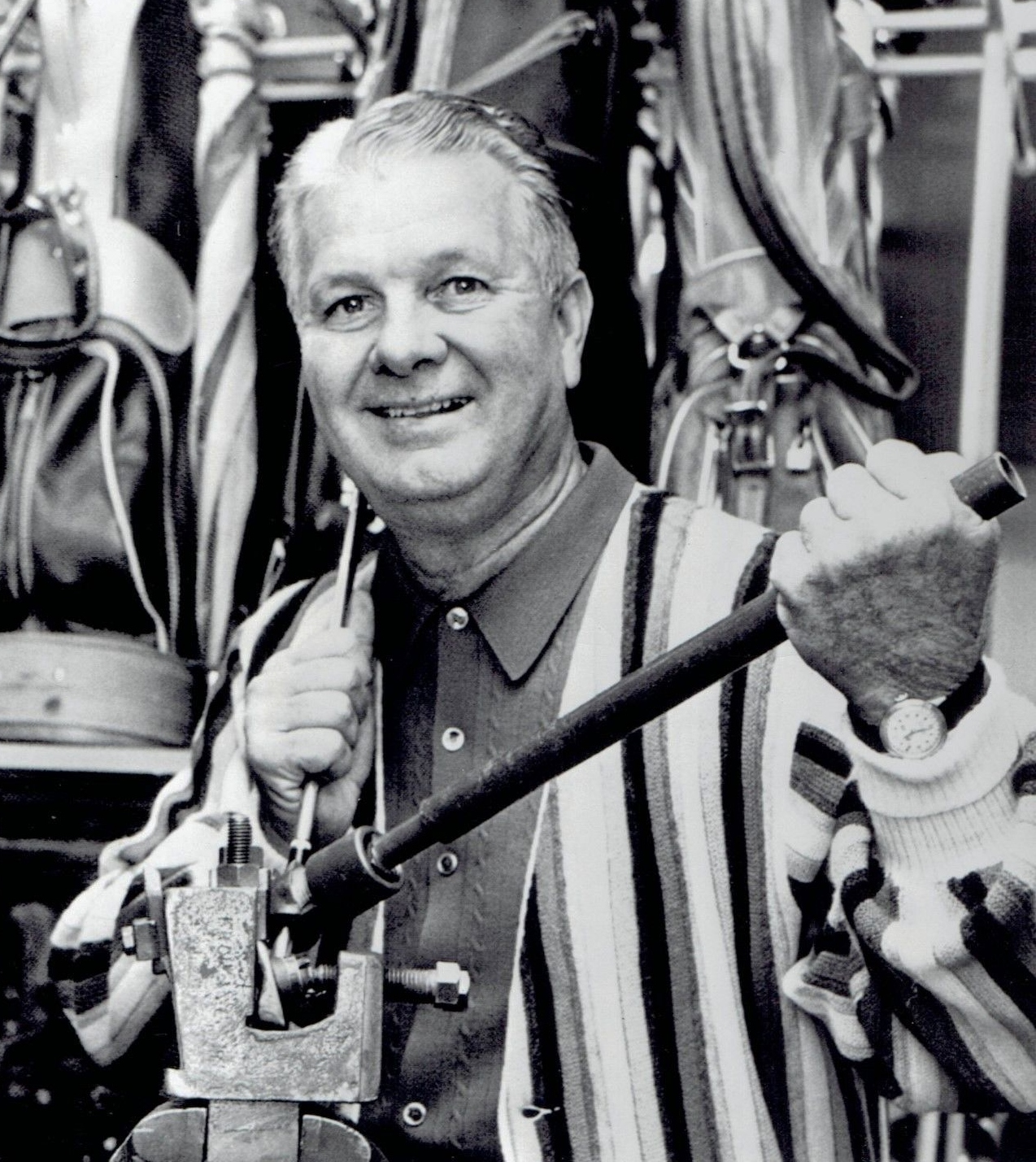
- Demaret in 1964

Personal information
- Full name: James Newton Demaret
- Nationality: United States
- Born: May 24, 1910 Houston, Texas, U.S.
- Died: December 28, 1983 (aged 73) Houston, Texas, U.S.
- Height: 5 ft 10.5 in (1.79 m)
- Weight: 190 lb (86 kg; 14 st)
- Spouse: Idella Adams
- Children: 1

Career
- Sport: Golf
- Turned professional: 1927
- Former tour: PGA Tour
- Professional wins: 37

Number of wins by tour
- PGA Tour: 31
- Other: 6

Best results in major championships (wins: 3)
- Masters Tournament: Won: 1940, 1947, 1950
- PGA Championship: T3: 1942, 1946, 1948, 1950
- U.S. Open: 2nd: 1948
- The Open Championship: T10: 1954

Achievements and awards
- World Golf Hall of Fame: 1983 (member page)
- PGA Tour leading money winner: 1947
- Vardon Trophy: 1947

James Newton Demaret (May 24, 1910 – December 28, 1983) was an American professional golfer. He won 31 PGA Tour events in a long career between 1935 and 1957, and was the first three-time winner of the Masters, with titles in 1940, 1947, and 1950.

== Life and career ==
Born in Houston, Texas, Demaret reached his peak in the late 1940s with wins in the Masters in 1947, runner-up to Ben Hogan in the 1948 U.S. Open, and leading money winner and Vardon Trophy winner in 1947. He reached the semifinals of the PGA Championship four times, but never made the finals. He was one stroke short of making the playoff for the 1957 U.S. Open, at age 47. He played on three Ryder Cup teams: 1947, 1949, and 1951. His career declined in the 1950s, although he managed several key wins including the 1952 Bing Crosby Pro-Am. His last Tour win came in 1957 at age 47, although he also teamed at age 51 with Sam Snead to win the Canada Cup for the U.S. in Puerto Rico.

Demaret's playing style was developed by necessity through the windy conditions of his native Texas. He favored a low fade (left-to-right flight) on his longer shots; the method gave good distance and excellent control. His skills were highly rated by his contemporaries; Ben Hogan, whose career overshadowed his, opined that he was the best player he had ever seen in windy conditions.

Demaret was known for his flamboyant personality, which he enhanced by wearing bright-colored clothing during tournaments; he had his clothes specially made, and became a fan favorite. As a result, he was known by his nickname, "The Wardrobe." He had a very good baritone voice and talent as a comedian; he frequently entertained at nightclubs at Tour stops.

Demaret was one of the first Tour pros to become involved in golf broadcasting. After working as a commentator for "All Star Golf" in the early 1960s, he replaced George Rogers in 1966 as co-host for Shell's Wonderful World of Golf with Gene Sarazen, the first winner of the career grand slam.

Business partner and double-major winner Jack Burke Jr. and Demaret started the high-standard 36-hole Champions Golf Club in Houston in the late 1950s. It hosted the 1967 Ryder Cup, the 1969 U.S. Open, the 1993 U.S. Amateur, and other high-profile events.

The over-70s groupings on the Senior PGA Tour were named the "Friends of Demaret" in his honor.

== Death ==
Demaret died of a heart attack at age 73 in Houston on December 28, 1983, as he was preparing for his daily ride around the Champions course. He was the third of the former Masters champions to pass away, preceded by Horton Smith in 1963 and Craig Wood in 1968.

== In popular culture ==
- He played himself in the 1951 Ben Hogan semi-autobiographical movie starring Glenn Ford and Anne Baxter called Follow the Sun.
- Demaret appeared as himself in an episode of I Love Lucy titled "The Golf Game" which first aired on January 27, 1954. In 1964, he made a second appearance with Lucille Ball on The Lucy Show. In 1961, he appeared on The Jim Backus Show, playing himself.

== Awards and honors ==
- In 1947, Demaret earned the Vardon Trophy, bestowed to the player with the best scoring average on tour.
- In 1947, he was the tour's leading money winner.
- In 1983, Demaret was elected to the World Golf Hall of Fame.
- In 2000, he was ranked as the 20th greatest golfer of all time by Golf Digest magazine.

== Professional wins (37) ==
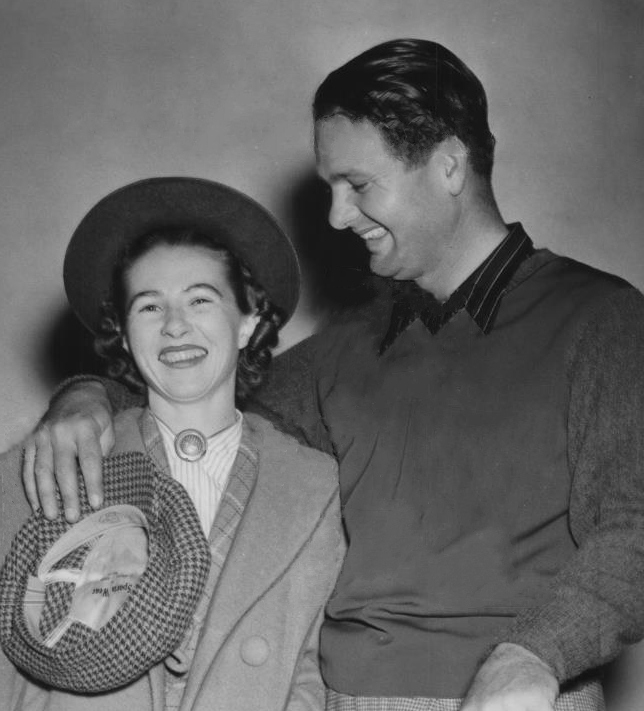
Demaret with wife Idella in 1940

=== PGA Tour wins (31) ===
- 1938 (1) San Francisco National Match Play Open
- 1939 (1) Los Angeles Open
- 1940 (6) Oakland Open, Western Open, New Orleans Open, St. Petersburg Open, **Masters Tournament**, San Francisco National Match Play Open
- 1941 (1) Inverness Invitational Four-Ball (with Ben Hogan)
- 1946 (3) Tucson Open, Miami International Four-Ball (with Ben Hogan), Inverness Invitational Four-Ball (with Ben Hogan)
- 1947 (6) Tucson Open, St. Petersburg Open, **Masters Tournament**, Miami Open, Miami International Four-Ball (with Ben Hogan), Inverness Invitational Four-Ball (with Ben Hogan)
- 1948 (3) Albuquerque Open, St. Paul Open, Inverness Invitational Four-Ball (with Ben Hogan)
- 1949 (1) Phoenix Open
- 1950 (3) Ben Hogan Open, **Masters Tournament**, North Fulton Open
- 1952 (2) Bing Crosby Pro-Am, National Celebrities Open
- 1956 (1) Thunderbird Invitational
- 1957 (3) Thunderbird Invitational, Baton Rouge Open Invitational, Arlington Hotel Open

Major championships are shown in bold.

=== Other wins (6) ===
this list may be incomplete

- 1941 Argentine Open, Connecticut Open
- 1943 Michigan PGA Championship, Golden Valley Four-Ball (with Craig Wood)
- 1951 Havana Invitational
- 1961 Canada Cup (with Sam Snead)

== Major championships ==
=== Wins (3) ===
Year	Championship	54 holes	Winning score	Margin	Runner(s)-up
1940	Masters Tournament	1 shot lead	−8 (67-72-70-71=280)	4 strokes	(United States) Lloyd Mangrum
1947	Masters Tournament (2)	3 shot lead	−7 (69-71-70-71=281)	2 strokes	(United States) Byron Nelson, (United States) Frank Stranahan
1950	Masters Tournament (3)	4 shot deficit	−5 (70-72-72-69=283)	2 strokes	(Australia) Jim Ferrier

=== Results timeline ===
Tournament	1935	1936	1937	1938	1939
Masters Tournament					T33
U.S. Open			T16	CUT	T22
The Open Championship					
PGA Championship	R64	R64	R64	R16	

Tournament	1940	1941	1942	1943	1944	1945	1946	1947	1948	1949
Masters Tournament	1	T12	6	NT	NT	NT	T4	1	T18	T8
U.S. Open	WD	WD	NT	NT	NT	NT	T6	T39	2	WD
The Open Championship	NT	NT	NT	NT	NT	NT				
PGA Championship	R32	R64	SF	NT			SF	R64	SF	QF

Tournament	1950	1951	1952	1953	1954	1955	1956	1957	1958	1959
Masters Tournament	1	T30	WD	T45	T29		T34	3	T14	CUT
U.S. Open	T20	T14	T15	T4	T29		CUT	3	WD	
The Open Championship					T10					
PGA Championship	SF						R64		DQ	

Tournament	1960	1961	1962	1963	1964	1965	1966	1967
Masters Tournament	CUT	CUT	T5	T43	T32	T35		CUT
U.S. Open								
The Open Championship								
PGA Championship								

Win
Top 10
Did not play

NT = no tournament
WD = withdrew
DQ = disqualified
CUT = missed the half-way cut
R64, R32, R16, QF, SF = Round in which player lost in PGA Championship match play
"T" indicates a tie for a place

=== Summary ===
Tournament	Wins	2nd	3rd	Top-5	Top-10	Top-25	Events	Cuts made
Masters Tournament	3	0	1	6	8	11	24	19
U.S. Open	0	1	1	3	4	9	17	11
The Open Championship	0	0	0	0	1	1	1	1
PGA Championship	0	0	4	5	6	7	14	13
Totals	3	1	6	14	19	28	56	44

- Most consecutive cuts made – 11 (1941 PGA – 1949 Masters)
- Longest streak of top-10s – 6 (1942 Masters – 1947 Masters)

== U.S. national team appearances ==
Professional

- Ryder Cup: 1947 (winners), 1949 (winners), 1951 (winners)
- Canada Cup: 1954, 1957, 1961 (winners)
- Lakes International Cup: 1952 (winners)

== See also ==
- List of golfers with most PGA Tour wins
