= Jim Ferrier =

Australian professional golfer (1915–1986)

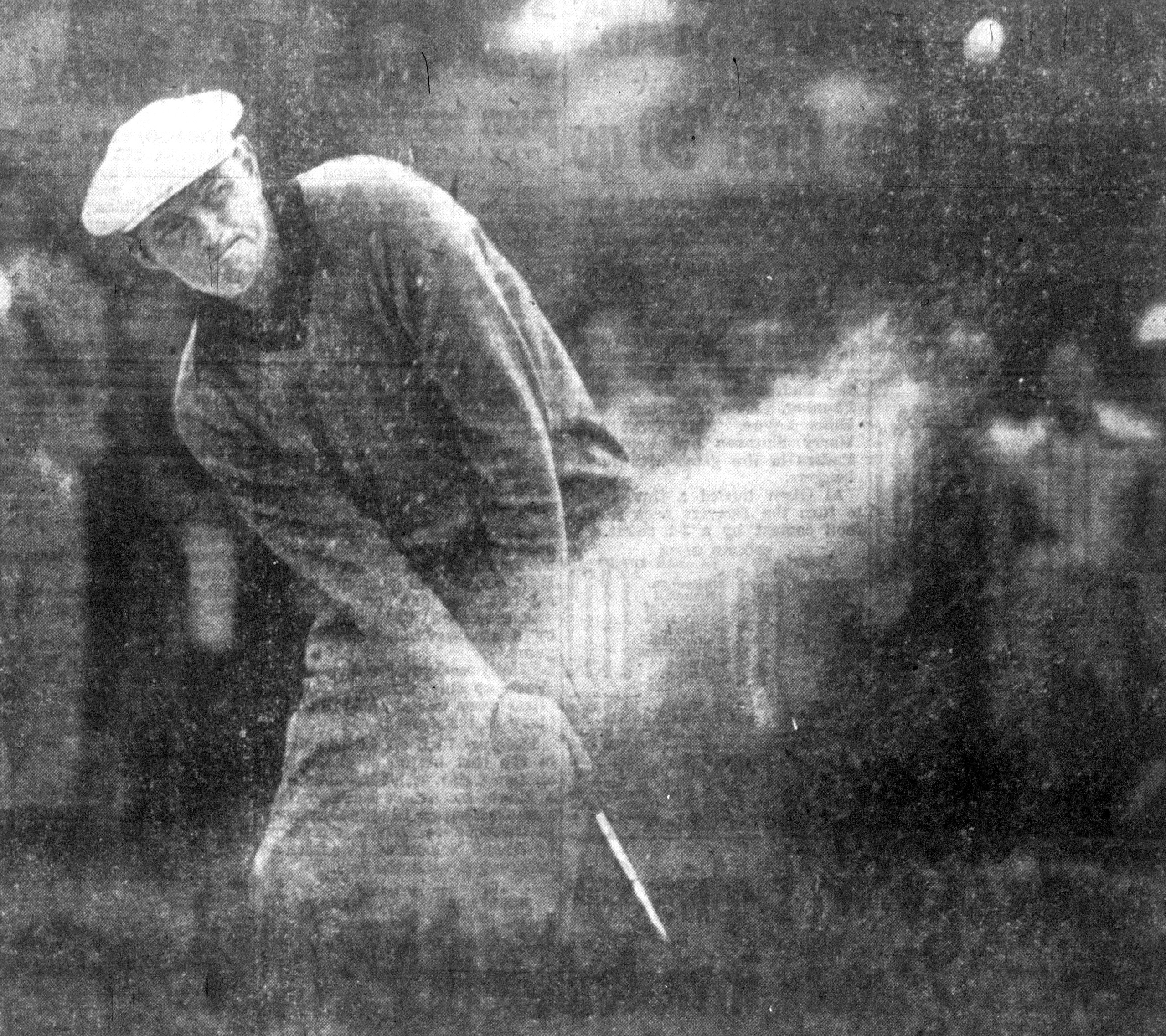
- Ferrier, circa 1950

Personal information
- Full name: James Bennett Elliott Ferrier
- Nicknames: Undertaker, Wolf
- Nationality: Australia
- Born: 24 February 1915 Sydney, Australia
- Died: 13 June 1986 (aged 71) Burbank, California, U.S.
- Height: 6 ft 4 in (1.93 m)
- Weight: 192 lb (87 kg; 13.7 st)
- Spouses: Norma Kathleen Jennings (m. 1938; died 1979) Lorraine Ruth (Devirian) Sheldon (m. 1980)

Career
- Sport: Golf
- Turned professional: 1941
- Former tour: PGA Tour
- Professional wins: 36

Number of wins by tour
- PGA Tour: 18
- PGA Tour of Australasia: 13
- Other: 5

Best results in major championships (wins: 1)
- Masters Tournament: 2nd: 1950
- PGA Championship: Won: 1947
- U.S. Open: T5: 1950
- The Open Championship: T44: 1936
- British Amateur: 2nd: 1936

Achievements and awards
- Sport Australia Hall of Fame: 1985

James Bennett Elliott Ferrier (24 February 1915 – 13 June 1986) was an Australian professional golfer. After compiling a fine record as an amateur golfer in Australia during the 1930s, he moved to the United States in 1940, turned professional in 1941, and joined the PGA Tour. He won the 1947 PGA Championship among his 18 tour titles and was the first Australian to win a major championship.

== Early life ==
Ferrier was born in Sydney, son of John Bennett Ferrier, who had worked as both an insurance clerk and an employee of American Tobacco Company, and his Australian-born wife, Louisa Elliott. Jim was raised in Manly, a coastal suburb (on the Northern headland) of Sydney, NSW, and was taught golf as a youth by his father, a low-handicap player, who was born of Scottish descent in Shanghai, China, with family from Carnoustie, Scotland. Ferrier Street in Carnoustie, near the world-famous golf course Carnoustie Golf Links, honors the family. The senior Ferrier took a job as secretary of the Manly Golf Club, where Jim began golf at age four and a half. Jim was educated at Sydney Grammar School. Young Ferrier injured a leg playing soccer in his teens, and he had to contend with a significant limp for the rest of his life.

== Amateur career ==
Ferrier was playing to a handicap of scratch (zero) by his mid-teens, when he left school to be able to play more golf; he was club champion for the first time at Manly at age 15. His first significant win at the state level came in the 1931 New South Wales Amateur Championship, and he repeated there in 1934, 1937, and 1938. From age 16, Ferrier represented New South Wales seven times in Australian Men's Interstate Teams Matches, in 1931, 1933, 1934, 1935, 1936, 1937, and 1939 and he compiled an overall head-to-head record of 7 wins and 3 losses in those events. He also played for New South Wales in the 1932 Kirk-Windeyer Cup, winning all his matches.

He was runner-up in the 1931 Australian Open at the age of 16, taking a six on the 72nd hole to lose by one stroke to five-time champion Ivo Whitton. He also finished runner-up in that championship in 1933 and 1935. He broke through to win in both 1938 (by 14 strokes) and 1939, still as an amateur. He won the Australian Amateur title in 1935, 1936, 1938 and 1939; his four titles in that event is tied for most with Michael Scott. Ferrier was also victorious in eight further significant Australian professional Open events during the 1930s (see below).

He had the opportunity to play exhibitions at Manly Golf Club with world-class players such as Walter Hagen and Gene Sarazen, along with Australian Joe Kirkwood, Sr., who had caddied at Manly for Ferrier's father. He also played with Harry Cooper in 1934, when an American team made a tour of Australia; the team also included stars such as Paul Runyan, Denny Shute, and Craig Wood.

Ferrier was runner-up in 1936 to Hector Thompson by 2-up, in The Amateur Championship at St Andrews; this was the best result by an Australian to that juncture, in the world's oldest amateur championship. On that same trip to the British Isles, Ferrier became the first Australian to win the Golf Illustrated Gold Vase, at the Ashridge Golf Club; this was one of the most prestigious amateur events in England. He traveled by ship from Australia to Britain, then on to the USA by ship after his British golf events, flew across the North American continent, then returned to Australia by ship across the Pacific, making a global circuit. He met Sarazen and woman pro Helen Hicks on ship, and played with them in Australia. Sarazen won the 1936 Australian Open.

Ferrier worked as a golf reporter and writer for several Australian publications.

In 1940, Ferrier went to the United States as a golf journalist, writing for The Sydney Morning Herald. Ferrier was not allowed to qualify for the U.S. Amateur, due to an Australian golf manual published earlier in the year that he was contracted to receive royalties from. His tournament entry was rejected by the United States Golf Association. At the time, amateur golf eligibility rules differed between Australia and the USA.

As an amateur, Ferrier played several Tour events in 1940, including the Masters Tournament, to which he had been invited based on his amateur record in Australia. However, he was allowed to enter several other amateur events in the U.S., despite the USGA's ruling. He scored his first win in the USA in the 1940 Chicago District Amateur Championship, at the Riverside Golf Club. In January 1941, Ferrier lost to George Dawson in the 36-hole final of the Miami Biltmore Hotel Amateur Championship.

== Professional career ==
In March 1941, Ferrier turned professional. He joined the PGA Tour as a club professional, based at the Elmhurst Country Club in Elmhurst, Illinois, near Chicago, joining the Professional Golfers Association of America. Ferrier signed a golf equipment contract with Wilson Sporting Goods.

At the onset of World War II, Ferrier and his wife Norma got defense industry jobs in the Chicago; this was part of conditions to become American citizens. He served in the U.S. Army from 1944 to 1945, rising to the rank of staff sergeant. While stationed in the artillery at Camp Roberts, California, he gained his first tour victory at the Oakland Open in December 1944, a week after a runner-up finish to Byron Nelson in San Francisco.

In 1946, following discharge from the Army, Ferrier embarked on full-time PGA Tour play. That year, he made golf history by becoming the first player to score a hole-in-one twice in one PGA Tour tournament. He performed the very rare feat at the Victory Bond San Francisco Open held at the Olympic Club, in the first and fourth rounds; despite this, Ferrier finished well behind champion Byron Nelson.

Ferrier's most significant career win came at the PGA Championship in 1947, one of golf's four major championships. He was the first Australian to win a major, and at the time this gave him a lifetime exemption to PGA Tour events. The previous year, he was the medalist in the stroke play qualifier and set the scoring record.

Ferrier returned to Australia on a trip in 1948, and lost an 18-hole playoff in the Australian Open to Ossie Pickworth, who won his third straight title. Pickworth, three years younger, had also grown up at the Manly Golf Club, had caddied for Ferrier there, and had worked at the club as an assistant professional.

At the 1950 Masters, Ferrier led Jimmy Demaret by three shots with six holes to play, but finished two strokes back as the runner-up to Demaret. He scored 16 of his 18 PGA titles between 1947 and 1952, with a peak of five wins in 1951; that was second on Tour to Cary Middlecoff (6). He was second leading money winner on the Tour that year, behind only Lloyd Mangrum. Ferrier's other significant victories included consecutive Canadian Open titles in 1950 and 1951.

Ferrier greatly scaled back his PGA Tour competition from 1954, and took a financially lucrative club professional's job with the Lakeside Country Club in suburban Los Angeles, for eight years. He did return to playing more Tour events in the early to mid 1960s, with some success. He was runner-up in the 1960 PGA Championship at age 45. His final Tour win in 1961 snapped a nine-year winless stretch, and he also won a California regional pro event in 1963 in his 48th year.

But his game fell off after that, although he continued to play some Tour events into the late 1970s, using his lifetime exemption. This created some friction on Tour, since he (and certain other non-competitive aging past champions) was blocking younger players from entering, with fields at limited sizes. An eventual change of PGA Tour regulations came from that, requiring veteran players to maintain a certain playing standard to continue to have access to tournaments. The present-day Champions Tour had not yet been created, although Ferrier did play some events on that Tour in the early 1980s, but struggled.

Ferrier became a member at the same city's Wilshire Country Club.

== Personal life ==
Ferrier married Norma Kathleen Jennings on 12 January 1938 at All Saints Church of England, Woollahra, Sydney. He taught Norma to play golf, and she eventually reached a three handicap, being proficient enough to help her husband with his game. The couple had no children.

On 6 January 1955 (Season 5 Episode 17), Ferrier appeared on the television game show You Bet Your Life hosted by Groucho Marx, of Marx Brothers fame. He was paired with Marilyn Pierce, a dog trainer and former model.

Ferrier died in Burbank, California, in 1986 at the age of 71.

== Awards and honors ==
Ferrier was made a member of the Sport Australia Hall of Fame with its inaugural class in 1985.

== Legacy ==
Ferrier did not begin playing the American PGA Tour full-time until 1946, the year he turned 31 years old. But over the next eight seasons, he compiled a very impressive record for outstanding, consistent play. From 1946 to 1953 inclusive, Ferrier finished in the top-25 of Tour events a total of 202 times. Over eight-year periods across the Tour's history, this total has been topped only by Doug Ford, with 223, from 1952–1959. Ferrier's single-season high was 34 top-25 finishes in 1950; this figure has been topped only by the 37 from Lloyd Mangrum in 1948, and by Harold McSpaden, with 35 in 1945; it was matched by Dow Finsterwald with 34 in 1956, with all data through the 1988 season. In terms of top-10 finishes, his 29 from 1950 has been surpassed only by 31 from McSpaden in 1945, and 30 from Byron Nelson, also in 1945.

Ferrier was ranked #22, through the 1988 season, by the Tour's wide-ranging statistical project, which tabulated in detail the performance statistics for the Tour's top 500 players, through the 1988 season.

As his success mounted, Ferrier helped to design a signature set of Wilson golf clubs; Wilson also issued a replica of Ferrier's putter – the Grandmaster – from his 1947 PGA Championship win; this putter is now a collector's item. He received an entry in the Australian Dictionary of Biography. His portrait is in the Australian National Portrait Gallery.

== Bibliography ==
- Jim Ferrier's Golf Shots, 1940, Australia.
- The Golf Clinic, 1949 (contributor)

== Amateur wins ==
Note: this list may be incomplete.

- 1931 New South Wales Amateur
- 1934 Queensland Amateur, New South Wales Amateur
- 1935 Queensland Amateur, Australian Amateur
- 1936 Australian Amateur, Golf Illustrated Gold Vase
- 1937 New South Wales Amateur
- 1938 Queensland Amateur, Australian Amateur, New South Wales Amateur
- 1939 Queensland Amateur, Australian Amateur
- 1940 Chicago District Amateur

== Professional wins (36) ==
=== PGA Tour wins (18) ===
Legend
Major championships (1)
Other PGA Tour (17)

No.	Date	Tournament	Winning score	Margin of victory	Runner(s)-up
1	10 Dec 1944	Oakland Open	−3 (73-68-68-68=277)	1 stroke	(United States) Ky Laffoon
2	24 Jun 1947	PGA Championship	2 and 1		(United States) Chick Harbert
3	3 Aug 1947	St. Paul Open	−16 (69-67-70-66=272)	Playoff	(United States) Fred Haas
4	9 Mar 1948	Miami International Four-Ball (with (United States) Cary Middlecoff)	1 up		(United States) Ed Furgol and (United States) Ellsworth Vines
5	13 Mar 1949	Miami International Four-Ball (2) (with (United States) Cary Middlecoff)	9 and 8		(United States) Skip Alexander and (England) Harry Cooper
6	21 Aug 1949	Grand Rapids Open	−25 (66-67-65-65=263)	4 strokes	(United States) Dutch Harrison
7	11 Sep 1949	Kansas City Open	−11 (69-69-69-70=277)	4 strokes	(United States) Dick Metz
8	16 Jul 1950	Inverness Invitational Four-Ball (with (United States) Sam Snead)	+18 points	13 points	(United States) Fred Haas and (United States) Fred Hawkins
9	23 Jul 1950	St. Paul Open (2)	−12 (65-71-69-71=276)	Playoff	(United States) Sam Snead
10	27 Aug 1950	Canadian Open	−17 (68-67-66-70=271)	3 strokes	(United States) Ted Kroll
11	4 Mar 1951	St. Petersburg Open	−16 (64-69-66-69=268)	6 strokes	(United States) Al Brosch
12	11 Mar 1951	Miami Beach Open	−15 (69-65-70-69=273)	1 stroke	(United States) Chuck Klein, (United States) Sam Snead
13	19 Mar 1951	Jacksonville Open	−16 (68-68-68-68=272)	11 strokes	(United States) Lloyd Mangrum, (United States) Jack Shields
14	7 Jul 1951	Canadian Open (2)	−7 (65-72-69-67=273)	2 strokes	(United States) Fred Hawkins, (United States) Ed Oliver
15	26 Aug 1951	Fort Wayne Open	−19 (66-66-66-71=269)	1 stroke	(United States) Cary Middlecoff
16	29 Jun 1952	Inverness Invitational Four-Ball (2) (with (United States) Sam Snead)	+13 points	12 points	(United States) Doug Ford and (United States) Ed Oliver
17	7 Sep 1952	Empire State Open	−18 (63-67-62-70=262)	6 strokes	(United States) Sam Snead
18	5 Nov 1961	Almaden Open Invitational	−9 (69-72-66-72=279)	1 stroke	(United States) Bob Rosburg

PGA Tour playoff record (2–1)

No.	Year	Tournament	Opponent(s)	Result
1	1947	St. Paul Open	(United States) Fred Haas	Won 18-hole playoff; Ferrier: −4 (68), Haas: −1 (71)
2	1950	St. Paul Open	(United States) Sam Snead	Won with par on third extra hole after 18-hole playoff; Ferrier: −3 (69), Snead: −3 (69)
3	1953	Houston Open	(United States) Shelley Mayfield, (United States) Cary Middlecoff, (United States) Bill Nary, (United States) Earl Stewart	Middlecoff won 18-hole playoff; Middlecoff: −3 (69), Ferrier: −1 (71), Mayfield: −1 (71), Stewart: E (72), Nary: +3 (75)

=== Australian wins (13) ===
Note: all wins except the 1948 Lakes Open win as an amateur

- 1933 New South Wales Close
- 1934 Queensland Open
- 1935 New South Wales Close
- 1936 New South Wales Close, Lakes Open
- 1937 New South Wales Close, Lakes Open
- 1938 Australian Open, New South Wales Close, Queensland Open
- 1939 Australian Open, Queensland Open
- 1948 Lakes Open

=== Other wins (5) ===
Note: this list may be incomplete.

- 1944 Northern California Open
- 1945 Northern California Open, 9th Service Command Golf Championship
- 1955 Southern California PGA Championship
- 1963 Southern California Open

== Major championships ==
=== Wins (1) ===
Year	Championship	Winning score	Runner-up
1947	PGA Championship	2 & 1	(United States) Chick Harbert

Note: The PGA Championship was match play until 1958

=== Results timeline ===
Tournament	1936	1937	1938	1939
Masters Tournament				
U.S. Open				
The Open Championship	T44			
PGA Championship				
The Amateur Championship	2			

Tournament	1940	1941	1942	1943	1944	1945	1946	1947	1948	1949
Masters Tournament	26	T29	T15	NT	NT	NT	T4	T6	T4	T16
U.S. Open	T29	T30	NT	NT	NT	NT	CUT	T6	CUT	T23
The Open Championship	NT	NT	NT	NT	NT	NT				
PGA Championship				NT			R16	1	R32	SF

Tournament	1950	1951	1952	1953	1954	1955	1956	1957	1958	1959
Masters Tournament	2	7	T3	T16	WD					
U.S. Open	T5	CUT		CUT						
The Open Championship										
PGA Championship	R32	R16	R32	R32						T38

Tournament	1960	1961	1962	1963	1964	1965	1966	1967	1968	1969
Masters Tournament			CUT		T5	CUT				
U.S. Open	CUT	T22			CUT	WD				
The Open Championship										
PGA Championship	2	T45	T39	7	T56	CUT	T49	T64	CUT	CUT

Tournament	1970	1971	1972	1973	1974	1975	1976	1977
Masters Tournament								
U.S. Open								
The Open Championship								
PGA Championship			CUT	CUT				WD

Win
Top 10
Did not play

NT = no tournament
WD = withdrew
CUT = missed the half-way cut
R32, R16, QF, SF = Round in which player lost in PGA Championship match play
"T" indicates a tie for a place

=== Summary ===
Tournament	Wins	2nd	3rd	Top-5	Top-10	Top-25	Events	Cuts made
Masters Tournament	0	1	1	5	7	10	15	12
U.S. Open	0	0	0	1	2	4	13	6
The Open Championship	0	0	0	0	0	0	1	1
PGA Championship	1	1	1	3	6	10	22	16
Totals	1	2	2	9	15	24	51	35

- Most consecutive cuts made – 7 (twice)
- Longest streak of top-10s – 5 (1946 PGA – 1948 Masters)

== Team appearances ==
Amateur

- Australian Men's Interstate Teams Matches (representing New South Wales): 1931, 1933, 1934 (winners), 1935, 1936, 1937 (winners), 1939

== See also ==
- List of golfers with most PGA Tour wins
- List of men's major championships winning golfers
