= Peter O'Hara =

Irish-American professional golfer (1885–1977)

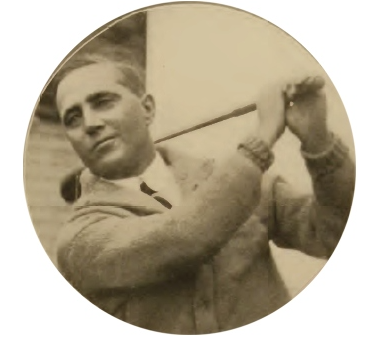
- Peter O'Hara, c. 1912

Personal information
- Full name: Peter Joseph O'Hara
- Nationality: Ireland; United States
- Born: 21 August 1885 Greenore, Ireland
- Died: 11 April 1977 (aged 91) Broward County, Florida
- Spouse: Hanora O'Hara

Career
- Sport: Golf
- Turned professional: c. 1908
- Former tour: PGA Tour
- Professional wins: 4

Best results in major championships
- Masters Tournament: DNP
- PGA Championship: T5: 1920
- U.S. Open: T7: 1924
- The Open Championship: DNP

Peter Joseph O'Hara (21 August 1885 – 11 April 1977) was an Irish-American professional golfer who played in the early-to-mid 20th century. His best major championship finishes were a fifth place tie in the 1920 PGA Championship, a T7 finish in the 1924 U.S. Open, and a T8 result in the 1929 U.S. Open.

He won the 1921 New Jersey Open and was a joint winner (with George Bowden) of the 1922 Houston Professional Golf tournament. O'Hara won the 1931 Western Pennsylvania Open Championship as well as the 1934 Bedford Open.

== Early life ==
O'Hara was born in Greenore, Ireland, in 1886. He emigrated to the United States on 7 April 1915 at age 27, sailing aboard the SS Cymric from Liverpool. He was the eldest of three brothers. His brothers Patrick and Jimmy were also golf professionals. Fellow Irish professional Pat Doyle was O'Hara's traveling companion aboard the Cymric which would find a watery grave just 13 months later on 8 May 1916 when it was sunk by a German U-boat during World War I.

== Golf career ==
=== Early career ===
In Ireland he was first engaged at the Greenore Golf Club at age 17 in 1903, a position he held until 1907. His next job was at Monkstown in Cork Harbour where he laid out a 9-hole course.

=== Emigration to the U.S. ===
After arrival in the U.S. in 1915, he first worked at Pittsburgh Field Golf Club from 1915–18. In late 1919, he took up a post at Haworth Country Club in Haworth, New Jersey, and in 1920 was employed by Shackamaxon Country Club in Scotch Plains, New Jersey, where he joined forces with his brother Patrick. He remained at Shackamaxon until 1922. The two brothers were a tough pair to beat in four-ball matches on their home course as evidenced by a surprising 6 and 5 victory they had in 1920 over the highly favored duo of Harry Vardon and Ted Ray.

O'Hara wasted no time getting his golf career going when he made a start in the 1915 U.S. Open at Baltusrol Golf Club. He didn't play his best golf, shooting 85 and 79, and failed to make the cut. His results were better in the 1917 Western Open where he finished tied for fifth behind Jim Barnes and Walter Hagen. In the 1930 U.S. Open he finished tied for 11th place and at the time was professional at the Westmoreland Country Club in Verona, Pennsylvania.

O'Hara was known for not taking any backswing whatsoever on short putts. He would simply place his putter head about 3-4 inches behind the ball and hit the ball from that position.

=== 1920 PGA Championship ===
In the 1920 PGA Championship held at the Flossmore County Club, located south of Chicago, O'Hara got off to a good start with a 1 up victory over Pat Doyle in the first round. He rode that momentum into the second round and defeated Alex Cunningham by a convincing 5 and 4 margin. His upset bid in the third round was spoiled when he lost to George McLean in a closely contested match that wasn't decided until the 38th hole. His final position in the tournament was a tie for fifth place.

=== 1924 U.S. Open ===
The 1924 U.S. Open was held 5–6 June at Oakland Hills Country Club in Birmingham, Michigan, a suburb northwest of Detroit. Cyril Walker, a relatively unknown Englishman, defeated defending champion Bobby Jones by three strokes at the South Course. O'Hara shot rounds of 76-79-74-76=305 (+18) and won $85, tying with Abe Espinosa for seventh place.

=== 1929 U.S. Open ===
The 1929 U.S. Open was held 27–30 June at Winged Foot Golf Club in Mamaroneck, New York, a suburb northeast of New York City. Bobby Jones won his third U.S. Open title in a 36-hole playoff, trouncing Al Espinosa (brother of Abe Espinosa) by 23 strokes on the West Course. O'Hara played steady golf, carding rounds of 74-76-73-78=301 (+13), and won $300 in prize money. He finished tied for eighth place.

== Death ==
O'Hara retired from Green Oaks Golf and Country Club (formerly Westmoreland Golf and Country Club) in 1948. He died on 11 April 1977, aged 91. Both he and his wife Hanora are interred in St. Joseph's Cemetery in Hackensack, New Jersey.

== Tournament wins (4) ==
- 1921 New Jersey Open
- 1922 Houston Professional Golf (tie with George Bowden)
- 1931 Western Pennsylvania Open Championship
- 1934 Bedford Open

== Results in major championships ==
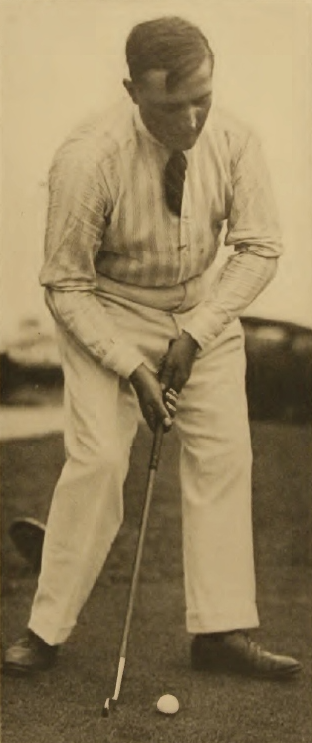
O'Hara, c. 1919

Tournament	1915	1916	1917	1918	1919	1920	1921	1922	1923	1924	1925	1926	1927	1928	1929	1930	1931	1932	1933	1934	1935
U.S. Open	CUT	NT	NT	NT		T27	T18			T7	WD	WD		CUT	T8	T11	T36		CUT		CUT
PGA Championship	NYF		NT	NT		QF	R32										R16				

Note: O'Hara never played in the Masters Tournament or The Open Championship.

Top 10
Did not play

NYF = tournament not yet founded
NT = no tournament
CUT = missed the half-way cut
WD = withdrew
R32, R16, QF, SF = round in which player lost in PGA Championship match play
T = tied for a place

== Note ==
Peter O'Hara is sometimes also known as Peter O'Hare.
