= 1937 U.S. Open (golf) =

Coordinates: 42.544°N 83.277°W

Tournament information
- Dates: June 10–12, 1937
- Location: Birmingham, Michigan
- Course(s): Oakland Hills Country Club, South Course
- Organized by: USGA
- Tour: PGA Tour
- Format: Stroke play − 72 holes

Statistics
- Par: 72
- Length: 7,037 yards (6,435 m)
- Field: 166 players, 65 after cut
- Cut: 152 (+8)
- Prize fund: $5,000
- Winner's share: $1,000

Champion
- (United States) Ralph Guldahl
- 281 (−7)

Location in the United States
Location in Michigan

The 1937 U.S. Open was the 41st U.S. Open, held June 10–12 at the South Course of Oakland Hills Country Club in Birmingham, Michigan, a suburb northwest of Detroit. Ralph Guldahl won the first of his two consecutive U.S. Opens, two strokes ahead of runner-up Sam Snead, making his U.S. Open debut.

Snead opened with a 69 to share the lead with Denny Shute. Through 54 holes, Snead and Guldahl trailed Ed Dudley by a stroke. During the final round on Saturday afternoon, Dudley shot a 76 and fell out of contention, while Snead birdied the last to finish with a 71 and a 283 total. Guldahl, playing well behind Snead, holed a 65-foot (20 m) putt for eagle at 8, then a birdie from 25 feet (8 m) at 9. After bogeys at 10 and 11, he rallied with birdies on the next two holes. He then went even on his last five holes to finish with a 69 and a 281 total, two better than Snead and a stroke better than the previous tournament record, set the previous year by Tony Manero.

Two years earlier, Guldahl had become so frustrated with the game that he quit to become a carpenter. After deciding to return to the game, he went through a period of dominance throughout the late-1930s. He won the Western Open, then considered on-par with the major championships, three years in a row; was runner-up in the Masters Tournament in 1937 and 1938 before winning in 1939; and successfully defended this U.S. Open title in 1938. For Snead, age 25, this tournament was just the beginning of a hard-luck career in the U.S. Open; he finished runner-up four times at the only major he never won.

Guldahl won the title with 19 clubs in his bag. The USGA rule (4-4) regarding a maximum of 14 clubs went into effect the following January.

Set at 7,037 yards (6,435 m), Oakland Hills was the first U.S. Open venue to surpass 7,000 yards (6,400 m); its average elevation is approximately 800 feet (245 m) above sea level.

The South Course previously hosted the U.S. Open in 1924, also at par 72, and it returned at par 70 in 1951, 1961, 1985, and 1996. It also later hosted the PGA Championship in 1972, 1979, and 2008. The second par-5 holes on each nine (#8, #18) were played at par-4.

== Course layout ==
South Course

Hole	1	2	3	4	5	6	7	8	9	Out	10	11	12	13	14	15	16	17	18	In	Total
Yards	443	512	200	447	449	351	416	491	215	3,514	448	413	555	142	450	405	380	198	537	3,523	7,037
Par	4	5	3	4	4	4	4	5	3	36	4	4	5	3	4	4	4	3	5	36	72

Length of the course for previous major:

- 6,880 yards (6,291 m), par 72 - 1924 U.S. Open

== Round summaries ==
=== First round ===
Thursday, June 10, 1937

Place	Player	Score	To par
T1	(United States) Denny Shute	69	−3
T1	(United States) Sam Snead	69	−3
T3	(United States) Ed Dudley	70	−2
T3	(United States) Johnny Goodman (a)	70	−2
T3	(United States) Bill Holt (a)	70	−2
T3	(United States) Frank Strafaci (a)	70	−2
T3	(United States) Frank Walsh	70	−2
T8	(United States) Ralph Guldahl	71	−1
T8	(United States) Fred Morrison	71	−1
T8	(United States) Henry Picard	71	−1
T8	(United States) Mike Turnesa	71	−1

=== Second round ===
Friday, June 11, 1937

Place	Player	Score	To par
T1	(United States) Ed Dudley	70-70=140	−4
T1	(United States) Ralph Guldahl	71-69=140	−4
T1	(United States) Frank Walsh	70-70=140	−4
T1	(Scotland) Jimmy Thomson	74-66=140	−4
T5	(United States) Harry Cooper	72-70=142	−2
T5	(United States) Pat Sawyer	72-70=142	−2
T5	(United States) Frank Strafaci (a)	70-72=142	−2
T5	(United States) Sam Snead	69-73=142	−2
T9	(United States) Vic Ghezzi	72-71=143	−1
T9	(United States) Johnny Goodman (a)	70-73=143	−1

=== Third round ===
Saturday, June 12, 1937 (morning)

Place	Player	Score	To par
1	(United States) Ed Dudley	70-70-71=211	−5
T2	(United States) Ralph Guldahl	71-69-72=212	−4
T2	(United States) Sam Snead	69-73-70=212	−4
4	(Scotland) Bobby Cruickshank	73-73-67=213	−3
T5	(United States) Harry Cooper	72-70-73=215	−1
T5	(United States) Al Brosch	74-73-68=215	−1
T5	(United States) Johnny Goodman (a)	70-73-72=215	−1
8	(United States) Pat Sawyer	72-70-75=217	+1
T9	(United States) Henry Picard	71-75-72=218	+2
T9	(United States) Gene Sarazen	78-69-71=218	+2
T9	(United States) Frank Walsh	70-70-78=218	+2

=== Final round ===
Saturday, June 12, 1937 (afternoon)

Place	Player	Score	To par	Money ($)
1	(United States) Ralph Guldahl	71-69-72-69=281	−7	1,000
2	(United States) Sam Snead	69-73-70-71=283	−5	800
3	(Scotland) Bobby Cruickshank	73-73-67-72=285	−3	700
4	(United States) Harry Cooper	72-70-73-71=286	−2	600
5	(United States) Ed Dudley	70-70-71-76=287	−1	450
6	(United States) Al Brosch	74-73-68-73=288	E	375
7	(United States) Clarence Clark	72-75-73-69=289	+1	275
8	(United States) Johnny Goodman (a)	70-73-72-75=290	+2	0
9	(United States) Frank Strafaci (a)	70-72-77-72=291	+3	0
T10	(United States) Charles Kocsis (a)	72-73-76-71=292	+4	0
T10	(United States) Henry Picard	71-75-72-74=292	+4	175
T10	(United States) Gene Sarazen	78-69-71-74=292	+4	175
T10	(United States) Denny Shute	69-76-75-72=292	+4	175

(a) = amateur

==== Scorecard ====
Hole	1	2	3	4	5	6	7	8	9	10	11	12	13	14	15	16	17	18
Par	4	5	3	4	4	4	4	5	3	4	4	5	3	4	4	4	5	4
(United States) Guldahl	−4	−4	−4	−4	−5	−4	−4	−6	−7	−6	−5	−6	−7	−7	−7	−7	−7	−7
(United States) Snead	−3	−4	−4	−4	−3	−3	−3	−4	−4	−4	−5	−5	−4	−4	−5	−5	−4	−5
(Scotland) Cruickshank	−3	−4	−4	−4	−3	−3	−3	−4	−4	−4	−3	−4	−3	−3	−3	−3	−3	−3
(England) (United States) Cooper	−1	−1	−1	−1	−1	E	E	E	E	−1	E	−1	−1	−1	E	E	−1	−2
(United States) Dudley	−4	−4	−5	−4	−4	−5	−6	−5	−5	−3	−2	−2	−3	−2	−1	E	−1	−1
(United States) Brosch	E	E	E	E	E	E	E	E	E	E	E	E	E	+1	+1	+1	+1	E
(United States) Clark	+3	+2	+2	+2	+2	+2	+2	+2	+3	+3	+3	+3	+2	+2	+2	+2	+2	+1
(United States) Goodman	E	E	E	E	E	E	E	−1	−1	E	−1	−1	−1	E	E	+2	+2	+2

Cumulative tournament scores, relative to par

Eagle	Birdie	Bogey	Double bogey	Triple bogey+
