= 2008 PGA Championship =

Coordinates: 42.544°N 83.277°W

Tournament information
- Dates: August 7–10, 2008
- Location: Bloomfield Hills, Michigan
- Courses: Oakland Hills Country Club, South Course
- Organized by: PGA of America
- Tours: PGA Tour; PGA European Tour; Japan Golf Tour

Statistics
- Par: 70
- Length: 7,395 yards (6,762 m)
- Field: 156 players, 73 after cut
- Cut: 148 (+8)
- Prize fund: $7,500,000 €4,804,330
- Winner's share: $1,350,000 €867,219

Champion
- (Republic of Ireland) Pádraig Harrington
- 277 (−3)

Location in the United States
Location in Michigan

The 2008 PGA Championship was the 90th PGA Championship, played from August 7–10 at Oakland Hills Country Club in Bloomfield Hills, Michigan, a suburb northwest of Detroit.

Pádraig Harrington won his second consecutive major and third overall, two strokes ahead of runners-up Ben Curtis and Sergio García. He earned $1.35 million for the victory, and became the first European-born winner of the PGA Championship in 78 years, last accomplished in the match play era by Tommy Armour of Scotland in 1930 (by then a naturalized U.S. citizen). Harrington was the first winner from Ireland, and the first European to win The Open Championship and the PGA Championship in the same year.

It was the ninth major championship contested at the South Course and the first in twelve years, when Steve Jones won the 1996 U.S. Open. The PGA Championship returned to "The Monster" for the first time in 29 years; the 1979 event was won by David Graham.

Tiger Woods, the two-time defending champion, did not compete due to rehabilitation for a season-ending knee surgery following his playoff victory in the U.S. Open in June.

The South Course previously hosted the PGA Championship in 1972 and 1979, the U.S. Open in 1924, 1937, 1951, 1961, 1985, and 1996, and the Ryder Cup in 2004.

== Field ==
The following is the qualification criteria that was used to select the field. Each player is listed according to the first category by which he qualified, but other categories are shown in parentheses:

1. All former PGA Champions
Paul Azinger, Rich Beem, Mark Brooks, John Daly, Steve Elkington, Davis Love III, Phil Mickelson (3,8,9,10), Vijay Singh (8,10), David Toms (9), Bob Tway
(Eligible but not competing: Jack Burke Jr., Dow Finsterwald, Raymond Floyd, Doug Ford, Al Geiberger, Wayne Grady, David Graham, Hubert Green, Don January, John Mahaffey, Shaun Micheel, Larry Nelson, Bobby Nichols, Jack Nicklaus, Gary Player, Nick Price, Bob Rosburg, Jeff Sluman, Dave Stockton, Hal Sutton, Lee Trevino, Lanny Wadkins, Tiger Woods)

2. Last five U.S. Open Champions
Ángel Cabrera, Michael Campbell, Retief Goosen, Geoff Ogilvy (6,8,10)

3. Last five Masters Champions
Trevor Immelman (6,8), Zach Johnson (8,9)

4. Last five British Open Champions
Todd Hamilton, Pádraig Harrington (8)

5. Current Senior PGA Champion
Jay Haas

6. 15 low scorers and ties in the 2007 PGA Championship
Stephen Ames (8,10), Stuart Appleby (8), Woody Austin (8), K. J. Choi (8,10), Simon Dyson, Ernie Els (8,10), Anders Hansen, Justin Rose (8), Adam Scott (8,10), John Senden (8), Kevin Sutherland (8), Scott Verplank (8,9), Boo Weekley (8,10)
(Eligible but not competing due to hand surgery – Arron Oberholser)

7. 20 low scorers in the 2008 PGA Professional National Championship
Sam Arnold, Ryan Benzel, Bradley Dean, Eric Dugas, Frank Esposito, Jr., Jim Estes, Kyle Flinton, Scott Hebert, Vince Jewell, Rick Leibovich, David Long, Eric Manning, Brad Martin, Jeff Martin, Alan Morin, Curt Sanders, Sonny Skinner, Tim Thelen, Tim Weinhart, Don Yrene

8. 70 leaders in official money standings from the 2007 WGC-Bridgestone Invitational and Reno-Tahoe Open to the 2008 RBC Canadian Open
Robert Allenby, Tommy Armour III, Aaron Baddeley, Briny Baird, Bart Bryant, Mark Calcavecchia, Chad Campbell (9,10), Daniel Chopra (10), Stewart Cink (9,10), Tim Clark, Ken Duke, Steve Flesch (10), Jim Furyk (9), Sergio García (10), Brian Gay (10), Mathew Goggin, Paul Goydos, J. B. Holmes (10), Ryuji Imada (10), Freddie Jacobson, Jerry Kelly, Anthony Kim (10), Justin Leonard (10), Peter Lonard, Steve Lowery (10), Hunter Mahan, John Mallinger, Steve Marino, Billy Mayfair, George McNeill (10), Rocco Mediate, John Merrick, Ryan Moore, Sean O'Hair (10), Rod Pampling, Pat Perez, Kenny Perry (10), Carl Pettersson, Ian Poulter, Jeff Quinney, Andrés Romero (10), Rory Sabbatini, Heath Slocum, Brandt Snedeker (10), Henrik Stenson, Steve Stricker (10), D. J. Trahan (10), Camilo Villegas, Johnson Wagner (10), Mike Weir (10), Dean Wilson
(Eligible but not competing due to wrist injury – Luke Donald)

9. Members of the 2006 United States Ryder Cup team
Chris DiMarco, J. J. Henry, Vaughn Taylor
(Eligible but not competing due to back injury – Brett Wetterich)

10. Winners of tournaments co-sponsored or approved by the PGA Tour since the 2007 PGA Championship
Richard S. Johnson, Greg Kraft, Parker McLachlin, Chez Reavie

11. The PGA of America reserves the right to invite additional players not included in the categories listed above
Mark Brown, Jonathan Byrd, Paul Casey, Darren Clarke, Fred Couples, Ben Crane, Ben Curtis, Nick Dougherty, Niclas Fasth, Ross Fisher, Alastair Forsyth, Hiroyuki Fujita, Richard Green, Søren Hansen, Peter Hanson, Peter Hedblom, Charles Howell III, Miguel Ángel Jiménez, Brendan Jones, Robert Karlsson, Martin Kaymer, James Kingston, Søren Kjeldsen, Pablo Larrazábal, Tom Lehman, Graeme McDowell, Colin Montgomerie, Nick O'Hern, Louis Oosthuizen, Hennie Otto, Corey Pavin, Prayad Marksaeng, Jyoti Randhawa, Charl Schwartzel, Jeev Milkha Singh, Scott Strange, Toru Taniguchi, Bubba Watson, Steve Webster, Lee Westwood, Oliver Wilson
(Declined invitation: Greg Norman – scheduling, Jason Bohn – back surgery, Shingo Katayama – back injury)

12. Vacancies are filled by the first available player from the list of alternates (those below 70th place in official money standings)

1. Charlie Wi (73) – replaced Brett Wetterich
2. Nicholas Thompson (77) – replaced Jason Bohn
3. Alex Čejka (78) – replaced Luke Donald
4. Cliff Kresge (79) – filled spot for WGC-Bridgestone Invitational winner Vijay Singh (already qualified)
5. Michael Allen (81) – replaced Shingo Katayama (back injury)
6. Tom Pernice Jr. (83) – replaced Alex Čejka (arm injury)

== Course layout ==
The 2008 PGA Championship at Oakland Hills Country Club
Tee	Rating/Slope	1	2	3	4	5	6	7	8	9	Out	10	11	12	13	14	15	16	17	18	In	Total
Yardage	n/a	435	529	198	446	490	387	449	491	257	3,682	462	423	593	191	501	401	406	238	498	3,713	7,395
Par		4	5	3	4	4	4	4	4	3	35	4	4	5	3	4	4	4	3	4	35	70

Lengths of the course for previous majors:

- 6,974 yards (6,377 m), par 70 - 1996 U.S. Open
- 6,996 yards (6,397 m), par 70 - 1985 U.S. Open
- 7,014 yards (6,414 m), par 70 - 1979 PGA Championship
- 7,054 yards (6,450 m), par 70 - 1972 PGA Championship
- 6,907 yards (6,316 m), par 70 - 1961 U.S. Open
- 6,927 yards (6,334 m), par 70 - 1951 U.S. Open
- 7,037 yards (6,435 m), par 72 - 1937 U.S. Open
- 6,880 yards (6,291 m), par 72 - 1924 U.S. Open

== Round summaries ==
=== First round ===
Thursday, August 7, 2008

A lengthy weather delay forced a few pairings to complete their first round on Friday morning. It was clear though on Thursday that Robert Karlsson and Jeev Milkha Singh would share the 18-hole lead after shooting matching 68s. Sergio García, still looking for his first major championship, headed up a group of five that shot one-under 69s. Phil Mickelson shot an even-par 70 to place him in an eight-way tie for eighth. Retief Goosen appeared to be piecing together a fabulous opening round when he birdied four of his first seven holes to get to -4. His fortunes would change, however, as he shot six-over the rest of the way to drop four strokes off the lead after the first day. Like Goosen, 2008 Open Champion, Pádraig Harrington, got off to a flying start by birdieing his first three holes. Unfortunately for him, he shot four-over the rest of the way to finish his round with a 71. Kenny Perry was forced to withdraw due to the effects of an eye problem that began plaguing him earlier in the week.

Place	Player	Score	To par
T1	(Sweden) Robert Karlsson	68	−2
T1	(India) Jeev Milkha Singh	68	−2
T3	(United States) Ken Duke	69	−1
T3	(Spain) Sergio García	69	−1
T3	(United States) Billy Mayfair	69	−1
T3	(United States) Sean O'Hair	69	−1
T3	(Argentina) Andrés Romero	69	−1
T8	(United States) Michael Allen	70	E
T8	(Argentina) Ángel Cabrera	70	E
T8	(United States) Brian Gay	70	E
T8	(United States) Anthony Kim	70	E
T8	(United States) Phil Mickelson	70	E
T8	(United States) Ryan Moore	70	E
T8	(Australia) Rod Pampling	70	E
T8	(South Korea) Charlie Wi	70	E

=== Second round ===
Friday, August 8, 2008

At the midway point of the 90th PGA Championship, the only golfer under par was J. B. Holmes. Holmes, whose best finish at a major was a tie for 25th at the Masters earlier in 2008, shot a two-under 68 to post a -1 after 36 holes. He was as many as three shots under par for the tournament, but bogeyed two of his final four holes. Ben Curtis and Justin Rose shared the best round of the day with three-under 67s to settle into a tie for second at even par with Charlie Wi. After withdrawing from the Open Championship, 2001 PGA Championship winner, David Toms, regained his form by shooting a one-under 69 to put himself in a tie for fifth with Henrik Stenson. Sergio García shot a three-over 73 to place himself in a seven-way tie for seventh. García appeared as if he would be higher on the leaderboard at the close of the day, but he double-bogeyed the 17th hole. Phil Mickelson bogeyed two of his final four holes to finish in a seven-way tie for 14th going into the weekend.

Seventy-three golfers would survive the cut which was set at 148 (+8). The winner at Bridgestone the previous week and world #4, Vijay Singh, was the most notable golfer to miss the cut when he five-putted his last hole. World #8, Adam Scott, world #9, Stewart Cink, 2007 PGA Championship runner-up, Woody Austin, and 2008 Masters champion, Trevor Immelman, were also among those who missed the cut.

Place	Player	Score	To par
1	(United States) J. B. Holmes	71-68=139	−1
T2	(United States) Ben Curtis	73-67=140	E
T2	(England) Justin Rose	73-67=140	E
T2	(South Korea) Charlie Wi	70-70=140	E
T5	(Sweden) Henrik Stenson	71-70=141	+1
T5	(United States) David Toms	72-69=141	+1
T7	(Australia) Aaron Baddeley	71-71=142	+2
T7	(Argentina) Ángel Cabrera	70-72=142	+2
T7	(United States) Ken Duke	69-73=142	+2
T7	(Spain) Sergio García	69-73=142	+2
T7	(United States) Sean O'Hair	69-73=142	+2
T7	(India) Jeev Milkha Singh	68-74=142	+2
T7	(United States) Brandt Snedeker	71-71=142	+2

=== Third round ===
Saturday, August 9, 2008
Sunday, August 10, 2008

At 2:16 pm EDT, scattered thunderstorms halted play before the leaders had a chance to begin their round. It appeared as if some golf was going to be played Saturday afternoon, but around 6:30 pm play was officially suspended for the day due to the persistent threat of thunderstorms. Andrés Romero was among those who had the chance to complete their round, and he posted a tournament low, five-under 65 to finish three strokes off the lead.

Third round play resumed Sunday at 7:15 am. The 2003 Open Champion, Ben Curtis stormed into the lead with birdies at four of his first six holes, and despite a bogey at the 18th hole, Curtis shot two-under 68 for a one stroke lead after 54 holes. Second round leader J. B. Holmes remained in contention with an even par 70 to place himself in a tie for second with Henrik Stenson. 2007 and 2008 Open Champion, Pádraig Harrington shot a four-under 66 to shoot up the leaderboard into a tie for fourth. Also among those at +1 was Sergio García, who shot a one-under 69. South Korean, Charlie Wi shot a one-over 71 to place himself in the three-way tie for fourth. Andrés Romero, who completed his round Saturday, woke up much higher on the leaderboard as his five-under 65 put him four strokes off the lead and in a tie for seventh. Former PGA Champions David Toms and Phil Mickelson sat five and six strokes off the lead respectively.

Place	Player	Score	To par
1	(United States) Ben Curtis	73-67-68=208	−2
T2	(United States) J. B. Holmes	71-68-70=209	−1
T2	(Sweden) Henrik Stenson	71-70-68=209	−1
T4	(Spain) Sergio García	69-73-69=211	+1
T4	(Republic of Ireland) Pádraig Harrington	71-74-66=211	+1
T4	(South Korea) Charlie Wi	70-70-71=211	+1
T7	(Argentina) Andrés Romero	69-78-65=212	+2
T7	(India) Jeev Milkha Singh	68-74-70=212	+2
T9	(Australia) Aaron Baddeley	71-71-71=213	+3
T9	(United States) Steve Flesch	73-70-70=213	+3
T9	(United States) David Toms	72-69-72=213	+3
T9	(Colombia) Camilo Villegas	74-72-67=213	+3

=== Final round ===
Sunday, August 10, 2008

With the third round concluding Sunday morning due to the thunderstorms on Saturday afternoon, the final round began at 12:30 pm EDT, in groups of three on split tees: the top half of the remaining field began at the first hole, and the remainder started at the tenth.

Pádraig Harrington claimed his second consecutive major championship and third in the last six majors, two strokes ahead of runners-up Ben Curtis and Sergio García. Harrington shot his second straight 66 (−4), and like his victory three weeks earlier at Royal Birkdale, he won with tremendous play on the back nine. Harrington birdied three of four holes at one point to erase a three-stroke deficit. He made three critical putts at each of the final three holes to seal the victory, which included an 18-foot (5.5 m) par putt on the 72nd hole to make García's upcoming par putt meaningless. Harrington became the first European since 1930 to win the PGA Championship, and only the fourth golfer to win the Open Championship and PGA Championship in the same year.

García flew out of the gate with a birdie and eagle on the first two holes. He went the first 15 holes without registering a bogey allowing him to play with the lead most of the day. However, his fortunes would change when he found the water at the 16th hole. He would lose sole ownership of the lead on this hole, and ultimately the tournament after failing to match the crucial putts made by Harrington. This marked the second time that Garcia has lost a major to Harrington going down the stretch after his playoff defeat to Harrington at the 2007 Open Championship. Curtis held at least a share of the lead until he bogeyed the final two holes on the front nine. He would come back and tie García briefly for the lead when he birdied the 14th hole. Curtis even found a way to earn par on the 16th despite his drive landing on the platform in front of a hospitality tent. However, he bogeyed two of his final four holes to finish two strokes off the lead.

Camilo Villegas had his best major finish with a tie for fourth, which was his second top 10 finish at the 2008 majors. He backed up his 67 earlier in the third round with a two-under 68 to finish four strokes behind Harrington. J. B. Holmes, who was one shot back to start the final round, triple bogeyed the first hole en route to an 11-over-par 81. Henrik Stenson had his second straight top 5 at the majors despite shooting a two-over 72 to fall into a tie with Villegas. Steve Flesch found the cup from the fairway on the 18th to become the first on the day to birdie the hole. He finished by himself in sixth place and recorded his second top 10 finish at the majors in 2008. Phil Mickelson birdied three of his first four holes to put himself in contention, but did not birdie another hole and fell into a tie for seventh with Andrés Romero. Romero was unable to back up the 65 he shot in the third round and never mustered up a challenge for the leaders.

Final Leaderboard
Place	Player	Score	To par	Money ($)
1	(Republic of Ireland) Pádraig Harrington	71-74-66-66=277	−3	1,350,000
T2	(United States) Ben Curtis	73-67-68-71=279	−1	660,000
T2	(Spain) Sergio García	69-73-69-68=279	−1	660,000
T4	(Sweden) Henrik Stenson	71-70-68-72=281	+1	330,000
T4	(Colombia) Camilo Villegas	74-72-67-68=281	+1	330,000
6	(United States) Steve Flesch	73-70-70-69=282	+2	270,000
T7	(United States) Phil Mickelson	70-73-71-70=284	+4	231,250
T7	(Argentina) Andrés Romero	69-78-65-72=284	+4	231,250
T9	(Scotland) Alastair Forsyth	73-72-70-70=285	+5	176,725
T9	(England) Justin Rose	73-67-74-71=285	+5	176,725
T9	(India) Jeev Milkha Singh	68-74-70-73=285	+5	176,725
T9	(South Korea) Charlie Wi	70-70-71-74=285	+5	176,725

Complete leaderboard

==== Scorecard ====
Hole	1	2	3	4	5	6	7	8	9	10	11	12	13	14	15	16	17	18
Par	4	5	3	4	4	4	4	4	3	4	4	5	3	4	4	4	3	4
(Republic of Ireland) Harrington	+1	E	E	E	+1	E	E	E	E	−1	−1	−2	−3	−2	−2	−2	−3	−3
(United States) Curtis	−3	−3	−3	−3	−3	−4	−4	−3	−2	−2	−1	−2	−2	−3	−2	−2	−1	−1
(Spain) García	E	−2	−2	−2	−2	−2	−3	−3	−3	−3	−3	−3	−3	−3	−3	−2	−2	−1
(Sweden) Stenson	E	−1	−1	−1	−1	−2	−2	−1	−1	−1	−1	E	E	E	+1	+2	+2	+1
(Colombia) Villegas	+2	+2	+2	+1	+2	+1	+2	+2	+3	+2	+3	+3	+3	+2	+1	+1	+1	+1
(South Korea) Wi	E	E	E	−1	E	+1	+1	+1	+3	+4	+4	+3	+4	+4	+5	+5	+5	+5
(United States) Holmes	+2	+3	+4	+4	+5	+4	+6	+7	+7	+6	+6	+5	+6	+7	+8	+8	+9	+10

Cumulative tournament scores, relative to par

Eagle	Birdie	Bogey	Double bogey	Triple bogey+

== Television ==
Television coverage was provided in the United States by CBS and TNT and on Sky Sports in the UK and Ireland. Coverage was in High Definition.
