= 1972 PGA Championship =

Coordinates: 42.544°N 83.277°W

Tournament information
- Dates: August 3–6, 1972
- Location: Bloomfield Hills, Michigan
- Course(s): Oakland Hills Country Club, South Course
- Organized by: PGA of America
- Tour: PGA Tour

Statistics
- Par: 70
- Length: 7,054 yards (6,450 m)
- Field: 138 players, 77 after cut
- Cut: 150 (+10)
- Prize fund: $224,087
- Winner's share: $45,000

Champion
- (South Africa) Gary Player
- 281 (+1)

Location in the United States
Location in Michigan

The 1972 PGA Championship was the 54th PGA Championship, played August 3–6 at Oakland Hills Country Club in Bloomfield Hills, Michigan, a suburb northwest of Detroit. Gary Player won his second PGA Championship with a total of 281 (+1), two strokes ahead of runners-up Tommy Aaron and Jim Jamieson. It was the sixth of Player's nine major titles, but his first in over four years.

The PGA Championship returned to the month of August in 1972 after being played in late February in 1971 in Florida.

Defending champion Jack Nicklaus, winner of the year's Masters and U.S. Open and runner-up in the British Open, finished six strokes back in a tie for thirteenth place. He regained the title the following year.

It was the fifth major championship held on the South Course, which previously hosted the U.S. Open in 1924, 1937, 1951, and 1961. It later hosted the PGA Championship in 1979 and 2008, the U.S. Open in 1985 and 1996, and the Ryder Cup in 2004.

== Course layout ==
Hole	1	2	3	4	5	6	7	8	9	Out	10	11	12	13	14	15	16	17	18	In	Total
Yards	446	521	202	439	442	368	408	458	227	3,511	459	420	567	173	468	388	408	201	459	3,543	7,054
Par	4	5	3	4	4	4	4	4	3	35	4	4	5	3	4	4	4	3	4	35	70

== Round summaries ==
=== First round ===
Thursday, August 3, 1972

Place	Player	Score	To par
T1	(United States) Buddy Allin	68	−2
T1	(United States) Stan Thirsk	68	−2
T3	(United States) Raymond Floyd	69	−1
T3	(United States) Larry Gilbert	69	−1
T3	(United States) Jerry Heard	69	−1
T3	(United States) Jim Jamieson	69	−1
T3	(United States) Arnold Palmer	69	−1
T8	(United States) Richard Crawford	70	E
T8	(United States) Rod Funseth	70	E
T8	(United States) Johnny Miller	70	E
T8	(United States) Dan Sikes	70	E
T8	(United States) Sam Snead	70	E
T8	(United States) Jim Wiechers	70	E

=== Second round ===
Friday, August 4, 1972

Place	Player	Score	To par
1	(United States) Jerry Heard	69-70=139	−1
T2	(United States) Raymond Floyd	69-71=140	E
T2	(United States) Hale Irwin	71-69=140	E
T4	(United States) Gay Brewer	71-70=141	+1
T4	(United States) Jim Jamieson	69-72=141	+1
T4	(United States) Bob Smith	69-72=141	+1
T7	(South Africa) Gary Player	71-71=142	+2
T7	(United States) Dan Sikes	70-72=142	+2
T7	(United States) Lanny Wadkins	74-68=142	+2
T10	(United States) Billy Casper	73-70=143	+3
T10	(United States) Phil Rodgers	71-72=143	+3
T10	(United States) Art Wall Jr.	72-71=143	+3
T10	(United States) Jim Wiechers	70-73=143	+3

=== Third round ===
Saturday, August 5, 1972

Place	Player	Score	To par
1	(South Africa) Gary Player	71-71-67=209	−1
2	(United States) Billy Casper	73-70-67=210	E
T3	(United States) Gay Brewer	71-70-70=211	+1
T3	(United States) Jerry Heard	69-70-72=211	+1
T3	(United States) Phil Rodgers	71-72-68=211	+1
T6	(United States) Tommy Aaron	71-71-70=212	+2
T6	(United States) Doug Sanders	72-72-68=212	+2
T6	(United States) Jim Wiechers	70-73-69=212	+2
T6	(United States) Larry Wise	74-71-67=212	+2
10	(United States) Jim Jamieson	69-72-72=213	+3

=== Final round ===
Sunday, August 6, 1972

Place	Player	Score	To par	Money ($)
1	(South Africa) Gary Player	71-71-67-72=281	+1	45,000
T2	(United States) Tommy Aaron	71-71-70-71=283	+3	20,850
T2	(United States) Jim Jamieson	69-72-72-70=283	+3	20,850
T4	(United States) Billy Casper	73-70-67-74=284	+4	9,275
T4	(United States) Raymond Floyd	69-71-74-70=284	+4	9,275
T4	(United States) Sam Snead	70-74-71-69=284	+4	9,275
T7	(United States) Gay Brewer	71-70-70-74=285	+5	6,383
T7	(United States) Jerry Heard	69-70-72-74=285	+5	6,383
T7	(United States) Phil Rodgers	71-72-68-74=285	+5	6,383
T7	(United States) Doug Sanders	72-72-68-73=285	+5	6,383
