= 1961 U.S. Open (golf) =

Coordinates: 42.544°N 83.277°W

Tournament information
- Dates: June 15–17, 1961
- Location: Birmingham, Michigan
- Course(s): Oakland Hills Country Club, South Course
- Organized by: USGA
- Tour: PGA Tour

Statistics
- Par: 70
- Length: 6,907 yards (6,316 m)
- Field: 149 players, 57 after cut
- Cut: 149 (+9)
- Prize fund: $60,500
- Winner's share: $14,000

Champion
- (United States) Gene Littler
- 281 (+1)

Location in the United States
Location in Michigan

The 1961 U.S. Open was the 61st U.S. Open, held June 15–17 at the South Course of Oakland Hills Country Club in Birmingham, Michigan, a suburb north of Detroit. Gene Littler shot a final round 68 for 281 (+1) to win his sole major title, one stroke ahead of runners-up Bob Goalby and Doug Sanders, the 54-hole leader.

Amateur Jack Nicklaus tied for fourth at age 21, the second of his three consecutive top-4 finishes at the U.S. Open. The runner-up the previous year, he turned professional in November and won the first of four U.S. Open titles the following year. Defending champion Arnold Palmer made the cut on the number at 149 (+9), then shot even-par twice and climbed into a tie for 14th place, eight strokes behind Littler. Four-time champion Ben Hogan also tied for 14th, the only time since 1940 that he was outside the top ten at this major. This course was the site of his third title a decade earlier in 1951, a rare successful defense. Hogan did not enter for five years and made his final U.S. Open appearances in 1966 and 1967.

The South Course previously hosted the U.S. Open in 1924, 1937, and 1951. It later hosted in 1985 and 1996, and the PGA Championship in 1972, 1979, and 2008.

== Round summaries ==
=== First round ===
Thursday, June 15, 1961

Place	Player	Score	To par
1	(United States) Bobby Brue	69	−1
T2	(United States) Tommy Bolt	70	Even
T2	(United States) Bob Goalby	70	Even
T4	(United States) Rex Baxter	71	+1
T4	(Australia) Bruce Crampton	71	+1
T4	(United States) Marty Furgol	71	+1
T4	(United States) Al Geiberger	71	+1
T4	(United States) Paul Harney	71	+1
T4	(United States) Ben Hogan	71	+1
T4	(Australia) Kel Nagle	71	+1

=== Second round ===
Friday, June 16, 1961

Place	Player	Score	To par
T1	(United States) Bob Rosburg	72-67=139	−1
T1	(United States) Doug Sanders	72-67=139	−1
T3	(United States) Bobby Brue	69-72=141	+1
T3	(United States) Gardner Dickinson	72-69=141	+1
T3	(United States) Doug Ford	72-69=141	+1
T3	(United States) Al Geiberger	71-70=141	+1
T3	(United States) Gene Littler	73-68=141	+1
T3	(United States) Eric Monti	74-67=141	+1
T9	(Australia) Bruce Crampton	71-71=142	+2
T9	(United States) Bob Goalby	70-72=141	+2
T9	(Australia) Kel Nagle	71-71=141	+2
T9	(United States) Bob Harris	75-67=141	+2

=== Third round ===
Saturday, June 17, 1961 (morning)

Place	Player	Score	To par
1	(United States) Doug Sanders	72-67-71=210	Even
T2	(United States) Jacky Cupit	72-72-67=211	+1
T2	(United States) Bob Goalby	70-72-69=211	+1
T2	(United States) Mike Souchak	73-70-68=211	+1
T5	(United States) Gardner Dickinson	72-69-71=212	+2
T5	(United States) Doug Ford	72-69-71=212	+2
T7	(United States) Gene Littler	73-68-72=213	+3
T7	(United States) Eric Monti	74-67-72=213	+3
T7	(United States) Bob Rosburg	72-67-74=213	+3
T10	(United States) Bobby Brue	69-72-73=214	+4
T10	(United States) Dow Finsterwald	72-71-71=214	+4
T10	(United States) Al Geiberger	71-70-73=214	+4
T10	(United States) Jack Nicklaus (a)	75-69-70=214	+4

(a) denotes amateur

=== Final round ===
Saturday, June 17, 1961 (afternoon)

At the start of the final round on Saturday afternoon, Littler was at 213 (+3), three strokes behind 54-hole leader Sanders. After a 34 on the front-nine, Littler tied for the lead with a birdie at 11. With a birdie at 13 combined with a Sanders bogey at the same hole, Littler was two strokes ahead. Sanders rebounded with a birdie at 16 to move within one. As Littler and Sanders reached the 18th, Goalby had already posted a 282 total, two off the pace. Littler needed no worse than bogey to get in ahead of Goalby, and that is what he shot, recording his lone bogey of the round for a 68 and a 281 total. Sanders, meanwhile, narrowly missed a birdie putt at 17, then almost chipped in for birdie at the last that would have forced a Sunday playoff. Sanders' putter cost him the championship, as he three-putted five of the last 36 greens. (He later missed a short putt to win The Open Championship in 1970.) Littler was the only player to break par twice.

Place	Player	Score	To par	Money ($)
1	(United States) Gene Littler	73-68-72-68=281	+1	14,000
T2	(United States) Bob Goalby	70-72-69-71=282	+2	6,000
T2	(United States) Doug Sanders	72-67-71-72=282	+2	6,000
T4	(United States) Jack Nicklaus (a)	75-69-70-70=284	+4	0
T4	(United States) Mike Souchak	73-70-68-73=284	+4	4,000
T6	(United States) Dow Finsterwald	72-71-71-72=286	+6	2,616
T6	(United States) Doug Ford	72-69-71-74=286	+6	2,616
T6	(United States) Eric Monti	74-67-72-73=286	+6	2,616
T9	(United States) Jacky Cupit	72-72-67-76=287	+7	1,750
T9	(United States) Gardner Dickinson	72-69-71-75=287	+7	1,750
T9	(South Africa) Gary Player	75-72-69-71=287	+7	1,750

(a) denotes amateur
