= 1951 U.S. Open (golf) =

Coordinates: 42.544°N 83.277°W

Tournament information
- Dates: June 14–16, 1951
- Location: Bloomfield Hills, Michigan
- Course(s): Oakland Hills Country Club; South Course
- Organized by: USGA
- Tour: PGA Tour

Statistics
- Par: 70
- Length: 6,927 yards (6,334 m)
- Field: 160 players, 55 after cut
- Cut: 152 (+12)
- Winner's share: $4,000

Champion
- (United States) Ben Hogan
- 287 (+7)

Location in the United States
Location in Michigan

The 1951 U.S. Open was the 51st U.S. Open, held June 14–16 at the South Course of Oakland Hills Country Club in Bloomfield Hills, Michigan, a suburb northwest of Detroit. Ben Hogan won his second consecutive U.S. Open title, two strokes ahead of runner-up Clayton Heafner. Hogan missed the 1949 U.S. Open due to an automobile accident; this was his third title in his last three attempts.

The South Course, dubbed "The Monster," played exceptionally tough for the first three rounds. No player was able to break par the first two days, and Jimmy Demaret's 70 was the only score to equal par in Saturday morning's third round. Sam Snead owned the first round lead at 71 (+1), while Bobby Locke led after the second round at 144 (+4) and shared the lead with Demaret after the third at 218 (+8).

Two strokes back after a 71 in the third round on Saturday morning, Hogan played one of the finest rounds in U.S. Open history that afternoon. Even-par on the front nine, he birdied the 10th and 13th holes. After a bogey at 14, he responded with another birdie at 15. At the 72nd hole, Hogan hit his approach shot on the par-4 to 15 feet (5 m) and sank the birdie putt to post a 67 (−3), the lowest round of the week, one of two sub-par rounds for the round (and championship). His 287 (+7) was two ahead of Heafner, who shot 69, the only other round under 70. At the trophy presentation, Hogan uttered the famous quote: "I'm glad I brought this course—this monster—to its knees."

This was the first U.S. Open that was notably toughened up by the USGA with narrow fairways and deep rough, attributing to "The Monster" nickname. The course also underwent a redesign by Robert Trent Jones prior to the championship, modifying the original Donald Ross design.

The South Course previously hosted the U.S. Open in 1924 and 1937; the winning score in 1937 was 281, sixteen strokes less than in 1924. It later hosted in 1961, 1985, and 1996, and the PGA Championship in 1972, 1979, and 2008.

Since Hogan repeated as champion in 1951, only Curtis Strange (1988, 1989) and Brooks Koepka (2017, 2018) have won consecutive U.S. Open titles.

== Course layout ==
Hole	1	2	3	4	5	6	7	8	9	Out	10	11	12	13	14	15	16	17	18	In	Total
Yards	440	510	200	448	437	350	381	458	216	3,440	448	407	566	169	447	392	405	194	459	3,487	6,927
Par	4	5	3	4	4	4	4	4	3	35	4	4	5	3	4	4	4	3	4	35	70

== Round summaries ==
=== First round ===
Thursday, June 14, 1951

Place	Player	Score	To par
1	(United States) Sam Snead	71	+1
T2	(United States) Al Besselink	72	+2
T2	(United States) Clayton Heafner	72	+2
T4	(United States) Sam Bernardi	73	+3
T4	(United States) Al Brosch	73	+3
T4	(United States) Sammy Byrd	73	+3
T4	(United States) Dutch Harrison	73	+3
T4	(United States) Charles Klein	73	+3
T4	(South Africa) Bobby Locke	73	+3
T4	(United States) Johnny Palmer	73	+3
T4	(United States) Smiley Quick	73	+3
T4	(United States) Paul Runyan	73	+3
T4	(United States) Denny Shute	73	+3

=== Second round ===
Friday, June 15, 1951

Place	Player	Score	To par
1	(South Africa) Bobby Locke	73-71=144	+4
2	(United States) Dave Douglas	75-70=145	+5
3	(United States) Bo Wininger (a)	75-71=146	+6
T4	(United States) Al Brosch	73-74=147	+7
T4	(United States) Clayton Heafner	72-75=147	+7
T4	(United States) Charles Klein	73-74=147	+7
T4	(United States) Paul Runyan	73-74=147	+7
T4	(United States) Lew Worsham	76-71=147	+7
T9	(United States) Julius Boros	74-74=148	+8
T9	(United States) Jimmy Demaret	74-74=148	+8
T9	(United States) Fred Hawkins	76-72=148	+8
T9	(United States) George Kinsman	75-73=148	+8
T9	(United States) Henry Ransom	74-74=148	+8
T9	(United States) Earl Stewart	74-74=148	+8
T9	(United States) Craig Wood	76-72=148	+8

=== Third round ===
Saturday, June 16, 1951 (morning)

Place	Player	Score	To par
T1	(United States) Jimmy Demaret	74-74-70=218	+8
T1	(South Africa) Bobby Locke	73-71-74=218	+8
T3	(United States) Julius Boros	74-74-71=219	+9
T3	(United States) Paul Runyan	73-74-72=219	+9
T5	(United States) Dave Douglas	75-70-75=220	+10
T5	(United States) Clayton Heafner	72-75-73=220	+10
T5	(United States) Ben Hogan	76-73-71=220	+10
8	(United States) Al Besselink	72-77-72=221	+11
T9	(United States) Johnny Revolta	78-72-72=222	+12
T9	(United States) Skee Riegel	75-76-71=222	+12

=== Final round ===
Saturday, June 16, 1951 (afternoon)

Place	Player	Score	To par	Money ($)
1	(United States) Ben Hogan	76-73-71-67=287	+7	4,000
2	(United States) Clayton Heafner	72-75-73-69=289	+9	2,000
3	(South Africa) Bobby Locke	73-71-74-73=291	+11	1,500
T4	(United States) Julius Boros	74-74-71-74=293	+13	700
T4	(United States) Lloyd Mangrum	75-74-74-70=293	+13	700
T6	(United States) Al Besselink	72-77-72-73=294	+14	387
T6	(United States) Dave Douglas	75-70-75-74=294	+14	387
T6	(United States) Fred Hawkins	76-72-75-71=294	+14	387
T6	(United States) Paul Runyan	73-74-72-75=294	+14	387
T10	(United States) Al Brosch	73-74-76-72=295	+15	187
T10	(United States) Smiley Quick	73-76-74-72=295	+15	187
T10	(United States) Skee Riegel	75-76-71-73=295	+15	187
T10	(United States) Sam Snead	71-78-72-74=295	+15	187
