= 1979 PGA Championship =

Tournament information
- Dates: August 2–5, 1979
- Location: Bloomfield Township, Michigan; 42.544°N 83.277°W
- Courses: Oakland Hills Country Club, South Course
- Organized by: PGA of America
- Tour: PGA Tour

Statistics
- Par: 70
- Length: 7,054 yards (6,450 m)
- Field: 150 players, 74 after cut
- Cut: 146 (+6)
- Prize fund: $350,600
- Winner's share: $60,000

Champion
- (Australia) David Graham
- 272 (−8), playoff
- Location in the United States Location in Michigan

The 1979 PGA Championship was the 61st PGA Championship, played August 2–5 at Oakland Hills Country Club in Bloomfield Township, Michigan, a suburb northwest of Detroit. After a double-bogey on the 72nd hole, David Graham won the first of his two major titles on the third hole of a sudden-death playoff with Ben Crenshaw. Through 17 holes in the final round, Graham was seven-under, with seven birdies and ten pars. Of the 21 holes he played Sunday, nine were birdies.

After 54 holes, Rex Caldwell was the leader at 203 (−7), Crenshaw was two strokes back and Graham four behind at 207 (−3), all in search of their first major title. It was the fifth runner-up finish for Crenshaw in a major, and second consecutive. He later won two majors, both at the Masters, in 1984 and 1995; Graham won his second at the U.S. Open in 1981 at Merion.

Three-time champion Sam Snead set the record for the oldest player to make the cut in a major. He was 67 years, 2 months, and 7 days of age at the cut and finished 42nd at 288 (+8). He won in 1942, 1949, and 1951, all in match play.

It was the sixth major championship held on the South Course, which previously hosted the PGA Championship in 1972 and the U.S. Open in 1924, 1937, 1951, and 1961. Due to heavy rainfall, the course was not nearly as hard as it had been in previous years, and the tournament was dubbed the "Monster Massacre" because of the shockingly low scores on the "Monster" South Course; there were 140 rounds at even par or below, and 15 players tied or beat Gary Player's winning 1972 score. The course later hosted the U.S. Open in 1985 and 1996, the PGA Championship in 2008, and the Ryder Cup in 2004.

This was the third consecutive playoff at the PGA Championship (and nearly the fourth, as the 1976 title was decided by the final putt on the 72nd green).

Graham became the second Australian-born player to win the PGA Championship, preceded by Jim Ferrier in 1947.

Jerry Pate and Tom Watson, runners-up in the previous year's playoff, were tied with Graham in third place after 54 holes. Pate's 71 tied for fifth but Watson's 74 dropped him into a tie for twelfth at 281. Watson had won three of his eight majors at this time, but never completed the career grand slam, missing the PGA Championship leg. Defending champion John Mahaffey tied for 51st.

This was the final major championship of the 1970s. Jack Nicklaus and Tom Weiskopf played in the event assuring that they played in every major championship in the 1970s. They were the first players to play in every major championship for an entire decade.

== Round summaries ==
=== First round ===
Thursday, August 2, 1979

Place	Player	Score	To par
1	(United States) Tom Watson	66	−4
2	(United States) Rex Caldwell	67	−3
T3	(United States) Jay Haas	68	−2
T3	(United States) Ron Streck	68	−2
T5	(United States) Ben Crenshaw	69	−1
T5	(United States) Gibby Gilbert	69	−1
T5	(Australia) David Graham	69	−1
T5	(United States) Hubert Green	69	−1
T5	(United States) Don January	69	−1
T5	(United States) Bruce Lietzke	69	−1
T5	(Australia) Graham Marsh	69	−1
T5	(United States) Jim Masserio	69	−1
T5	(United States) Artie McNickle	69	−1
T5	(United States) Jerry Pate	69	−1
T5	(United States) Alan Tapie	69	−1

=== Second round ===
Friday, August 3, 1979

Place	Player	Score	To par
1	(United States) Ben Crenshaw	69-67=136	−4
T2	(United States) Rex Caldwell	67-70=137	−3
T2	(Australia) David Graham	69-68=137	−3
T2	(United States) Jay Haas	68-69=137	−3
T5	(United States) Bruce Lietzke	69-69=138	−2
T5	(United States) Jerry Pate	69-69=138	−2
T5	(United States) Alan Tapie	73-65=138	−2
T5	(United States) Tom Watson	66-72=138	−2
T9	(United States) Rod Funseth	70-69=139	−1
T9	(United States) Hubert Green	69-70=139	−1
T9	(United States) Don January	69-70=139	−1
T9	(Australia) Graham Marsh	69-70=139	−1
T9	(United States) Artie McNickle	69-70=139	−1
T9	(United States) Ron Streck	68-71=139	−1
T9	(United States) Leonard Thompson	72-67=139	−1

=== Third round ===
Saturday, August 4, 1979

Place	Player	Score	To par
1	(United States) Rex Caldwell	67-70-66=203	−7
2	(United States) Ben Crenshaw	69-67-69=205	−5
T3	(Australia) David Graham	69-68-70=207	−3
T3	(United States) Jerry Pate	69-69-69=207	−3
T3	(United States) Tom Watson	66-72-69=207	−3
6	(United States) Ron Streck	68-71-69=208	−2
T7	(United States) Gibby Gilbert	69-72-68=209	−1
T7	(United States) Bruce Lietzke	69-69-71=209	−1
T7	(United States) Gene Littler	71-71-67=209	−1
T10	(Australia) Graham Marsh	69-72-68=209	E
T10	(United States) Jay Haas	68-69-73=210	E
T10	(United States) Don January	69-70-71=210	E

=== Final round ===
Sunday, August 5, 1979

Place	Player	Score	To par	Money ($)
T1	(Australia) David Graham	69-68-70-65=272	−8	Playoff
T1	(United States) Ben Crenshaw	69-67-69-67=272	−8	Playoff
3	(United States) Rex Caldwell	67-70-66-71=274	−6	25,000
4	(United States) Ron Streck	68-71-69-68=276	−4	20,000
T5	(United States) Gibby Gilbert	69-72-68-69=278	−2	14,500
T5	(United States) Jerry Pate	69-69-69-71=278	−2	14,500
T7	(United States) Jay Haas	68-69-73-69=279	−1	9,200
T7	(United States) Don January	69-70-71-69=279	−1	9,200
T7	(United States) Howard Twitty	70-73-69-67=279	−1	9,200
T10	(United States) Lou Graham	69-74-68-69=280	E	6,750
T10	(United States) Gary Koch	71-71-71-67=280	E	6,750

==== Scorecard ====
Birdie	Bogey	Double bogey

Final round

Hole	1	2	3	4	5	6	7	8	9	10	11	12	13	14	15	16	17	18
Par	4	5	3	4	4	4	4	4	3	4	4	5	3	4	4	4	3	4
(Australia) Graham	−4	−5	−5	−5	−5	−5	−6	−7	−7	−8	−9	−9	−9	−9	−10	−10	−10	−8

Cumulative tournament scores, relative to par

==== Playoff ====
The sudden-death playoff began at the first tee and Graham saved par with one putt from 18 feet (5.5 m) to tie. At the par-5 second hole, Crenshaw tapped in for birdie while Graham sank a ten-footer (3 m) to continue. He won with a birdie on the 202-yard (185 m) par-3 third hole, after Crenshaw found a bunker and his 25-foot (8 m) putt for par lipped out. Graham put his 4-iron tee shot to within 8 feet (2.4 m) and with two putts to win, sank the first.

Place	Player	Score	To par	Money ($)
1	(Australia) David Graham	4-4-2	−2	60,000
2	(United States) Ben Crenshaw	4-4-4	E	40,000

==== Scorecard ====
Hole	1	2	3
Par	4	5	3
(Australia) Graham	E	−1	−2
(United States) Crenshaw	E	−1	E
