= 1996 U.S. Open (golf) =

Coordinates: 42.544°N 83.277°W

Tournament information
- Dates: June 13–16, 1996
- Location: Bloomfield Hills, Michigan
- Courses: Oakland Hills Country Club; South Course
- Organized by: USGA
- Tour: PGA Tour

Statistics
- Par: 70
- Length: 6,974 yards (6,377 m)
- Field: 156 players, 108 after cut
- Cut: 148 (+8)
- Prize fund: $2.4 million
- Winner's share: $425,000

Champion
- (United States) Steve Jones
- 278 (−2)

Location in the United States
Location in Michigan

The 1996 U.S. Open was the 96th U.S. Open, held June 13–16 at Oakland Hills Country Club in Birmingham, Michigan, a suburb northwest of Detroit. Steve Jones won his only major title, one stroke ahead of runners-up Tom Lehman and Davis Love III.

Jones went through an incredible journey just to get to Oakland Hills. He had won four PGA Tour events, the last in 1989, but in November 1991 he was involved in a dirt bike accident that threatened to end his career. He separated his shoulder and sprained an ankle, as well as suffering ligament damage in his left ring finger. Jones was sidelined for three years, not making it back on tour until 1994. His win here came in his first U.S. Open since 1991, and he was the first champion to go through sectional qualifying since tour rookie Jerry Pate in 1976. After this win, Jones won three additional events on tour.

This was the eighth major championship at the South Course, which previously hosted the U.S. Open in 1924, 1937, 1951, 1961, and 1985, and the PGA Championship in 1972 and 1979. It later hosted the PGA Championship in 2008.

It was Lehman's third close call in a major (1994 Masters, 1995 U.S. Open); he regrouped and won the next, The Open Championship in England. Love won the PGA Championship the following year at Winged Foot.

== Course layout ==
South Course

Hole	1	2	3	4	5	6	7	8	9	Out	10	11	12	13	14	15	16	17	18	In	Total
Yards	433	523	194	430	455	356	405	440	220	3,456	450	399	560	170	471	400	403	200	465	3,518	6,974
Par	4	5	3	4	4	4	4	4	3	35	4	4	5	3	4	4	4	3	4	35	70

Lengths of the course for previous majors:

- 6,996 yards (6,397 m), par 70 - 1985 U.S. Open
- 7,014 yards (6,414 m), par 70 - 1979 PGA Championship
- 7,054 yards (6,450 m), par 70 - 1972 PGA Championship
- 6,907 yards (6,316 m), par 70 - 1961 U.S. Open
- 6,927 yards (6,334 m), par 70 - 1951 U.S. Open
- 7,037 yards (6,435 m), par 72 - 1937 U.S. Open
- 6,880 yards (6,291 m), par 72 - 1924 U.S. Open

== Round summaries ==
=== First round ===
Thursday, June 13, 1996

Woody Austin, playing in his first U.S. Open, and Payne Stewart each shot a 3-under-par 67 for a 1-stroke lead over Lee Janzen and John Morse. Frank Nobilo, Philip Walton and Paul Azinger were among the group at 1-under 69 as well as two club professionals, Bob Ford and Gary Trivisonno.

20-year-old amateur Tiger Woods was 3-under thru his first 13 holes and held a share of the lead, but would play the last five holes at 9-over-par for a first round 76.

Place	Player	Score	To par
T1	(United States) Woody Austin	67	−3
T1	(United States) Payne Stewart	67	−3
T3	(United States) Lee Janzen	68	−2
T3	(United States) John Morse	68	−2
T5	(United States) Paul Azinger	69	−1
T5	(United States) David Berganio Jr.	69	−1
T5	(United States) Stewart Cink	69	−1
T5	(United States) Bob Ford	69	−1
T5	(New Zealand) Frank Nobilo	69	−1
T5	(Japan) Masashi Ozaki	69	−1
T5	(Republic of Ireland) Philip Walton	69	−1
T5	(United States) Gary Trivisonno	69	−1

=== Second round ===
Friday, June 14, 1996

Payne Stewart shot a second round 71 to hold sole possession of the lead. Greg Norman moved up into a tie for 2nd after shooting a 66. There were only four golfers with sub-par scores through 36 holes after 12 players broke par on Thursday. A total of 108 players in the field of 156 made the cut, a U.S. Open record. The previous record was 88 at Baltusrol in 1993.

Place	Player	Score	To par
1	(United States) Payne Stewart	67-71=138	−2
T2	(United States) Woody Austin	67-72=139	−1
T2	(South Africa) Ernie Els	72-67=139	−1
T2	(Australia) Greg Norman	73-66=139	−1
T5	(United States) Ken Green	73-67=140	E
T5	(United States) Steve Jones	74-66=140	E
T5	(United States) Davis Love III	71-69=140	E
T5	(New Zealand) Frank Nobilo	69-71=140	E
T5	(Scotland) Sam Torrance	71-69=140	E
T10	(United States) Billy Andrade	72-69=141	+1
T10	(United States) David Berganio Jr.	69-72=141	+1
T10	(United States) John Cook	70-71=141	+1
T10	(United States) John Daly	72-69=141	+1
T10	(United States) Jim Furyk	72-69=141	+1
T10	(United States) Neal Lancaster	74-67=141	+1
T10	(Japan) Masashi Ozaki	69-72=141	+1
T10	(United States) Scott Simpson	70-71=141	+1
T10	(United States) Tom Watson	70-71=141	+1

Amateurs: Scott (+4), Woods (+5), Kuehne (+8), Leen (+8), Hobby (+10), Edstrom (+14).

=== Third round ===
Saturday, June 15, 1996

Place	Player	Score	To par
1	(United States) Tom Lehman	71-72-65=208	−2
2	(United States) Steve Jones	74-66-69=209	−1
T3	(United States) Davis Love III	71-69-70=210	E
T3	(United States) John Morse	68-74-68=210	E
T3	(New Zealand) Frank Nobilo	69-71-70=210	E
T6	(United States) Woody Austin	67-72-72=211	+1
T6	(South Africa) Ernie Els	72-67-72=211	+1
T6	(United States) Jim Furyk	72-69-70=211	+1
T6	(Scotland) Colin Montgomerie	70-72-69=211	+1
T6	(Scotland) Sam Torrance	71-69-71=211	+1

=== Final round ===
Sunday, June 16, 1996

In the final pairing, Tom Lehman had a three-stroke lead over Steve Jones after eight holes, but bogeyed 10 and 12 and Jones led by two strokes with six holes remaining. Tied at the 18th tee, Lehman drove into a bunker and missed a 15-foot (4.5 m) putt to save par. Davis Love III made a charge, recording birdies at 11, 12, and 15; he bogeyed the final two holes, missing a 3-footer (0.9 m) for par at the last. John Morse came to the 18th tee 1-under needing birdie to tie Jones and Lehman for the lead; he hit the green in two on the par-4 finishing hole, but 3-putted from 30 feet to finish at even par for the tournament and end up alone in fourth place. Unlike Love, Morse and Lehman, Jones did not bogey the last; he hit his approach to 12 feet (3.7 m) and two-putted for par to prevail by one.

Place	Player	Score	To par	Money ($)
1	(United States) Steve Jones	74-66-69-69=278	−2	425,000
T2	(United States) Tom Lehman	71-72-65-71=279	−1	204,801
T2	(United States) Davis Love III	71-69-70-69=279	−1	204,801
4	(United States) John Morse	68-74-68-70=280	E	111,235
T5	(South Africa) Ernie Els	72-67-72-70=281	+1	84,965
T5	(United States) Jim Furyk	72-69-70-70=281	+1	84,965
T7	(United States) Ken Green	73-67-72-70=282	+2	66,295
T7	(United States) Scott Hoch	73-71-71-67=282	+2	66,295
T7	(Fiji) Vijay Singh	71-72-70-69=282	+2	66,295
T10	(United States) Lee Janzen	68-75-71-69=283	+3	52,591
T10	(Scotland) Colin Montgomerie	70-72-69-72=283	+3	52,591
T10	(Australia) Greg Norman	73-66-74-70=283	+3	52,591

Amateurs: Leen (+11), Kuehne (+13), Woods (+14), Scott (+21)

==== Scorecard ====
Hole	1	2	3	4	5	6	7	8	9	10	11	12	13	14	15	16	17	18
Par	4	5	3	4	4	4	4	4	3	4	4	5	3	4	4	4	3	4
(United States) Jones	−1	−1	−1	−1	−1	−1	−1	−1	−2	−3	−3	−4	−3	−3	−3	−3	−2	−2
(United States) Lehman	−1	−2	−2	−2	−2	−3	−4	−4	−4	−3	−3	−2	−2	−2	−2	−2	−2	−1
(United States) Love	E	−1	−1	E	E	E	E	−1	−1	E	−1	−2	−2	−2	−3	−3	−2	−1
(United States) Morse	E	E	E	E	E	−1	−1	−1	−1	−1	−1	−2	−1	−1	−2	−1	−1	E
(South Africa) Els	+1	+1	+1	+1	+2	+1	E	+1	+2	+2	+3	+2	+2	+3	+2	+2	+1	+1
(United States) Furyk	+1	E	E	E	E	E	+1	+2	+2	+2	+1	E	E	E	E	−1	E	+1
(New Zealand) Nobilo	−1	−1	−1	−1	−1	−1	−1	−2	−2	−2	−1	−1	−1	E	+2	+3	+3	+4

Cumulative tournament scores, relative to par

Birdie	Bogey	Double Bogey
