= 1929 U.S. Open (golf) =

Coordinates: 40.958°N 73.754°W

Tournament information
- Dates: June 27–30, 1929
- Location: Mamaroneck, New York
- Courses: Winged Foot Golf Club, West Course
- Organized by: USGA
- Tour: PGA Tour
- Format: Stroke play − 72 holes

Statistics
- Par: 72
- Length: 6,786 yards (6,205 m)
- Field: 142 players, 67 after cut
- Cut: 159 (+15)
- Prize fund: $5,000
- Winner's share: $1,000; Awarded to runner-up

Champion
- (United States) Bobby Jones (a)
- 294 (+6), playoff

Location in the United States
Location in New York

The 1929 U.S. Open was the 33rd U.S. Open, held June 27–30 at Winged Foot Golf Club in Mamaroneck, New York, a suburb northeast of New York City. Bobby Jones won his third U.S. Open title in a 36-hole playoff, besting Al Espinosa by 23 strokes on the West Course.

Jones opened with a 69 in the first round to grab the lead, then followed with a 75.

After a third round 71, he had a three-stroke lead over Gene Sarazen and was four clear of Espinosa after 54 holes. Sarazen fell out of contention in the final round with a 78 and fell to a tie for third place. Espinosa shot a 75 and a 294 total, but it appeared like it would not be enough to overtake Jones. Beginning with the 15th, Jones needed only three bogeys and a par to win the championship. However, he triple-bogeyed the 15th and then made another bogey on 16 and his lead was gone. He made par at the 17th, but his approach on the 18th found a greenside bunker. Needing to get up-and-down to save par and force a playoff, Jones rolled in a 12-foot (3.7 m) putt for the tie.

Jones dominated the 36-hole playoff on Sunday, with a 72 in the morning round to grab a 12-shot lead. Espinosa struggled again on the second 18, shooting an 80 to Jones' 69, and Jones won the playoff by 23 shots. He won his fourth U.S. Open in 1930 and the grand slam. The 23-stroke win is the largest margin of victory in a major golf tournament playoff.

Originally scheduled to be played over the East Course at Winged Foot, storm damaged caused the championship to be relocated to the West Course. It was the first of six U.S. Opens to be held on Winged Foot's West Course; it later hosted in 1959, 1974, 1984, 2006, and 2020; it also hosted the PGA Championship in 1997.

== Course layout ==
West Course

| Hole | Name | Yards | Par | Hole | Name | Yards | Par |
|---|---|---|---|---|---|---|---|
| 1 | Genesis | 445 | 4 | 10 | Pulpit | 190 | 3 |
| 2 | Elm | 376 | 4 | 11 | Billows | 378 | 4 |
| 3 | Pinnacle | 217 | 3 | 12 | Cape | 497 | 5 |
| 4 | Sound View | 406 | 4 | 13 | White Mule | 213 | 3 |
| 5 | Long Lane | 517 | 5 | 14 | Shamrock | 376 | 4 |
| 6 | El | 323 | 4 | 15 | Pyramid | 397 | 4 |
| 7 | Babe-in-the-Woods | 170 | 3 | 16 | Hells Bells | 456 | 5 |
| 8 | Arena | 439 | 4 | 17 | Well-Well | 450 | 4 |
| 9 | Meadow | 517 | 5 | 18 | Revelations | 419 | 4 |
| Out | | 3,410 | 36 | In | | 3,376 | 36 |
| Source: | | | | Total | | 6,786 | 72 |

== Round summaries ==
=== First round ===
Thursday, June 27, 1929

| Place | Player | Score | To par |
|---|---|---|---|
| 1 | (United States) Bobby Jones (a) | 69 | −3 |
| 2 | (United States) Al Espinosa | 70 | −2 |
| 3 | (United States) Gene Sarazen | 71 | −1 |
| T4 | (United States) Chris Hilgendorf | 72 | E |
| T4 | (Scotland) Jack White | 72 | E |
| T6 | (United States) Leonard Schnutte | 73 | +1 |
| T6 | (United States) Denny Shute | 73 | +1 |
| T8 | (United States) Tommy Armour | 74 | +2 |
| T8 | (United States) Wiffy Cox | 74 | +2 |
| T8 | (United States) Jack Cummins (a) | 74 | +2 |
| T8 | (United States) Leo Diegel | 74 | +2 |
| T8 | (United States) Ted Longworth | 74 | +2 |
| T8 | (United States) Larry Nabholtz | 74 | +2 |

=== Second round ===
Friday, June 28, 1929

| Place | Player | Score | To par |
|---|---|---|---|
| T1 | (United States) Gene Sarazen | 71-71=142 | −2 |
| T1 | (United States) Al Espinosa | 70-72=142 | −2 |
| T3 | (United States) Bobby Jones (a) | 69-75=144 | E |
| T3 | (United States) Denny Shute | 73-71=144 | E |
| 5 | (United States) Tommy Armour | 74-71=145 | +1 |
| T6 | (United States) Leo Diegel | 74-74=148 | +4 |
| T6 | (United States) Leonard Schnutte | 73-75=148 | +4 |
| T8 | (United States) George Von Elm (a) | 79-70=149 | +5 |
| T9 | (United States) Wiffy Cox | 74-76=150 | +6 |
| T9 | (United States) Peter O'Hara | 74-76=150 | +6 |
| T9 | (United States) Craig Wood | 79-71=150 | +6 |

=== Third round ===
Saturday, June 29, 1929 (morning)

| Place | Player | Score | To par |
|---|---|---|---|
| 1 | (United States) Bobby Jones (a) | 69-75-71=215 | −1 |
| 2 | (United States) Gene Sarazen | 71-71-76=218 | +2 |
| 3 | (United States) Al Espinosa | 70-72-77=219 | +3 |
| 4 | (United States) Denny Shute | 73-71-76=220 | +4 |
| 5 | (United States) Tommy Armour | 74-71-76=221 | +5 |
| T6 | (United States) George Von Elm (a) | 79-70-74=223 | +7 |
| T6 | (United States) Peter O'Hara | 74-76-73=223 | +7 |
| T8 | (United States) Henry Ciuci | 78-74-72=224 | +8 |
| T8 | (United States) Leo Diegel | 74-74-76=224 | +8 |
| 10 | (United States) Horton Smith | 76-77-74=227 | +11 |

=== Final round ===
Saturday, June 29, 1929 (afternoon)

| Place | Player | Score | To par | Money ($) |
|---|---|---|---|---|
| T1 | (United States) Bobby Jones (a) | 69-75-71-79=294 | +6 | Playoff |
| T1 | (United States) Al Espinosa | 70-72-77-75=294 | +6 | Playoff |
| T3 | (United States) Gene Sarazen | 71-71-76-78=296 | +8 | 700 |
| T3 | (United States) Denny Shute | 73-71-76-76=296 | +8 | 700 |
| T5 | (United States) Tommy Armour | 74-71-76-76=297 | +9 | 550 |
| T5 | (United States) George Von Elm (a) | 79-70-74-74=297 | +9 | 0 |
| 7 | (United States) Henry Ciuci | 78-74-72-75=299 | +11 | 450 |
| T8 | (United States) Leo Diegel | 74-74-76-77=301 | +13 | 300 |
| T8 | (United States) Peter O'Hara | 74-76-73-78=301 | +13 | 300 |
| 10 | (United States) Horton Smith | 76-77-74-75=302 | +14 | 150 |

(a) denotes amateur

==== Scorecard ====
Final round

| Hole | 1 | 2 | 3 | 4 | 5 | 6 | 7 | 8 | 9 | 10 | 11 | 12 | 13 | 14 | 15 | 16 | 17 | 18 |
|---|---|---|---|---|---|---|---|---|---|---|---|---|---|---|---|---|---|---|
| Par | 4 | 4 | 3 | 4 | 5 | 4 | 3 | 4 | 5 | 3 | 4 | 5 | 3 | 4 | 4 | 5 | 4 | 4 |
| (United States) Jones | −1 | E | −1 | −1 | −1 | −1 | −1 | +2 | +1 | +2 | +2 | +2 | +3 | +3 | +6 | +6 | +6 | +6 |
| (United States) Espinosa | +4 | +4 | +3 | +4 | +3 | +3 | +4 | +4 | +3 | +4 | +5 | +8 | +8 | +8 | +8 | +7 | +6 | +6 |
| (United States) Sarazen | +3 | +3 | +3 | +3 | +4 | +5 | +5 | +7 | +7 | +7 | +7 | +7 | +7 | +7 | +8 | +7 | +8 | +8 |
| (United States) Shute | +6 | +7 | +7 | +7 | +8 | +7 | +7 | +7 | +6 | +7 | +6 | +6 | +6 | +6 | +7 | +7 | +7 | +8 |

Cumulative tournament scores, relative to par

=== Playoff ===
Sunday, June 30, 1929

| Place | Player | Score | To par | Money ($) |
|---|---|---|---|---|
| 1 | (United States) Bobby Jones (a) | 72-69=141 | −3 | 0 |
| 2 | (United States) Al Espinosa | 84-80=164 | +20 | 1,000 |

==== Scorecards ====
Morning round

| Hole | 1 | 2 | 3 | 4 | 5 | 6 | 7 | 8 | 9 | 10 | 11 | 12 | 13 | 14 | 15 | 16 | 17 | 18 |
|---|---|---|---|---|---|---|---|---|---|---|---|---|---|---|---|---|---|---|
| Par | 4 | 4 | 3 | 4 | 5 | 4 | 3 | 4 | 5 | 3 | 4 | 5 | 3 | 4 | 4 | 5 | 4 | 4 |
| (United States) Jones | +2 | +2 | +3 | +3 | +2 | +1 | +1 | +1 | +1 | +1 | E | −1 | E | −1 | +1 | E | E | E |
| (United States) Espinosa | E | +1 | +1 | +1 | +1 | +1 | +2 | +3 | +3 | +5 | +5 | +8 | +8 | +8 | +8 | +9 | +11 | +12 |

Afternoon round

| Hole | 1 | 2 | 3 | 4 | 5 | 6 | 7 | 8 | 9 | 10 | 11 | 12 | 13 | 14 | 15 | 16 | 17 | 18 |
|---|---|---|---|---|---|---|---|---|---|---|---|---|---|---|---|---|---|---|
| Par | 4 | 4 | 3 | 4 | 5 | 4 | 3 | 4 | 5 | 3 | 4 | 5 | 3 | 4 | 4 | 5 | 4 | 4 |
| (United States) Jones | E | +1 | +1 | +1 | +1 | +1 | E | E | E | E | E | −1 | −1 | −1 | −2 | −3 | −3 | −3 |
| (United States) Espinosa | +13 | +13 | +14 | +14 | +16 | +17 | +17 | +17 | +16 | +18 | +18 | +18 | +18 | +18 | +18 | +17 | +18 | +20 |

Cumulative playoff scores, relative to par

| Birdie | Bogey | Double bogey | Triple bogey+ |
