= Houston Open (early PGA Tour) =

Golf tournament formerly on the PGA Tour

Coordinates: 29.753°N 95.426°W

Location in the United States
Location in Texas

The Houston Open was a golf tournament in Texas in the early years of the PGA Tour, played sporadically in Houston between 1922 and 1938. The last two editions were at par-71 River Oaks Country Club, played February 11–14, 1937, and December 29–31, 1938.

The area received an annual tournament in 1946, and River Oaks was the site for its first edition.

Year	Player	Country	Score	To par	Winner's share ($)	Purse ($)	Ref
Houston Open
1938	Jug McSpaden	United States	212#	–1	700	3,000	
1937	Harry Cooper	United States	280	–4	700	3,000	
1933–36: No tournament
1932	Clarence Clark	United States	220#	+4	500	2,000	
1931: No tournament
1930	Al Espinosa	United States	281	–7	600	2,500	
1925–29: No tournament
1924	Joe Kirkwood, Sr.	Australia	259^		500		
Houston Invitational
1923	Joe Kirkwood, Sr.	Australia	151*		200		
Houston Professional Golf
1922	George Bowden; Peter O'Hara (tie)		147*				

# Scheduled 54 holes
^ Played over 64 holes (holes 16 and 17 unplayable)
* Scheduled 36 holes
