= 1985 U.S. Open (golf) =

Coordinates: 42.544°N 83.277°W

Tournament information
- Dates: June 13–16, 1985
- Location: Bloomfield Hills, Michigan
- Courses: Oakland Hills Country Club, South Course
- Tour: PGA Tour

Statistics
- Par: 70
- Length: 6,996 yards (6,397 m)
- Field: 156 players, 66 after cut
- Cut: 146 (+6)
- Prize fund: $650,000
- Winner's share: $103,000

Champion
- (United States) Andy North
- 279 (−1)

Location in the United States

The 1985 U.S. Open was the 85th U.S. Open, held June 13–16 at the South Course of Oakland Hills Country Club in Bloomfield Hills, Michigan, a suburb northwest of Detroit. Andy North, the 1978 champion, won his second U.S. Open title by a stroke over runners-up Dave Barr, Chen Tze-chung, and Denis Watson.

Chen had a historic beginning to the U.S. Open. In his first three rounds, he established a new course record at Oakland Hills with a 65, made the first double eagle in U.S. Open history, and established both 36 and 54-hole scoring records. Heading into the final round, he owned a two-stroke advantage over North, who shot 65 in the second round and 70 in the third. Chen increased his lead over North to four shots after just four holes of play. But at the 5th hole, disaster struck for Chen as he saw his lead dissolve in unique fashion. His approach shot from the fairway found deep rough well short and right of the green. His first chip shot stopped several yards short of the green. Hitting his fourth shot, and still in the deep rough, Chen's wedge got tangled up in the grass upon impact and struck the ball a second time on the follow-thru, sending the ball careening short of the green. Chen was assessed the stroke and a penalty. Now lying five, he chipped on and two-putted for a quadruple bogey 8. He had seen a four-stroke lead vanish in one hole and was now tied with playing partner North.

Unnerved by the mistake, Chen proceeded to bogey the next three holes, and North took a one-stroke lead over Barr at the turn. Chen recovered with a birdie at 12, and with North bogeying 9, 10, and 11, he found himself back in the lead. North, however, would be the last man standing. He birdied 13 while Chen bogeyed 14 and 17, and Barr bogeyed his final two holes. At the 18th, Chen narrowly missed a bunker shot to miss a chance at forcing a playoff, and both Barr and Chen finished at 280. North could protect his lead and two-putted for bogey and a one-stroke victory.

Penalties played an additional role in the 1985 U.S. Open, as Denis Watson of Zimbabwe, who also finished 1-stroke behind North, had been assessed a two-stroke penalty in the first-round for taking too long over a putt, as USGA rules allowed a 10-second wait for a ball resting on the cup edge, and an official ruled he took 35-seconds and assessed the penalty. The rules to assess penalties on both Chen and Watson have since been changed.

In the final round, North hit only four fairways and recorded just one birdie. For the tournament, he had just nine birdies, the lowest by a champion in post-World War II U.S. Open history. North finished at 279 (−1), the only player to finish under par. It was his first PGA Tour win since the 1978 U.S. Open, and was his last on tour.

Jack Nicklaus shot 149 (+9) and missed the cut by three strokes, ending a streak of 21 consecutive cuts made at the U.S. Open.

This was the seventh major championship at the South Course, which previously hosted the U.S. Open in 1924, 1937, 1951, and 1961, and the PGA Championship in 1972 and 1979. It later hosted the U.S. Open in 1996 and the PGA Championship in 2008.

== Course layout ==
South Course

Hole	1	2	3	4	5	6	7	8	9	Out	10	11	12	13	14	15	16	17	18	In	Total
Yards	436	527	199	433	457	359	405	439	217	3,472	454	411	560	172	465	399	409	201	453	3,524	6,996
Par	4	5	3	4	4	4	4	4	3	35	4	4	5	3	4	4	4	3	4	35	70

Lengths of the course for previous majors:

- 7,014 yards (6,414 m), par 70 - 1979 PGA Championship
- 7,054 yards (6,450 m), par 70 - 1972 PGA Championship
- 6,907 yards (6,316 m), par 70 - 1961 U.S. Open
- 6,927 yards (6,334 m), par 70 - 1951 U.S. Open
- 7,037 yards (6,435 m), par 72 - 1937 U.S. Open
- 6,880 yards (6,291 m), par 72 - 1924 U.S. Open

== Round summaries ==
=== First round ===
Thursday, June 13, 1985

Place	Player	Score	To par
1	(Taiwan) Chen Tze-chung	65	−5
2	(United States) Fred Couples	66	−4
T3	(United States) Andy Bean	69	−1
T3	(United States) Rick Fehr	69	−1
T3	(United States) Jay Haas	69	−1
T3	(United States) Tom Kite	69	−1
T3	(United States) Mike Reid	69	−1
T8	(Canada) Dave Barr	70	E
T8	(United States) Bill Glasson	70	E
T8	(United States) Skeeter Heath	70	E
T8	(United States) Andy North	70	E
T8	(United States) Gene Sauers	70	E
T8	(United States) Payne Stewart	70	E
T8	(United States) Lanny Wadkins	70	E

=== Second round ===
Friday, June 14, 1985

Place	Player	Score	To par
1	(Taiwan) Chen Tze-chung	65-69=134	−6
T2	(United States) Jay Haas	69-66=135	−5
T2	(United States) Andy North	70-65=135	−5
4	(United States) Rick Fehr	69-67=136	−4
5	(Zimbabwe) Denis Watson	72-65=137	−3
6	(Canada) Dave Barr	70-68=138	−2
T7	(United States) Raymond Floyd	72-67=139	−1
T7	(United States) Tom Kite	69-70=139	−1
T7	(United States) Mark O'Meara	72-67=139	−1
T7	(United States) Curtis Strange	71-68=139	−1

Amateurs: Sigel (+5), Verplank (+6), Randolph (+7), Townes (+12), Van Orman (+17), Tominaga (+18), Janzen (+21), Townes (+22)

=== Third round ===
Saturday, June 15, 1985

Place	Player	Score	To par
1	(Taiwan) Chen Tze-chung	65-69-69=203	−7
2	(United States) Andy North	70-65-70=205	−5
3	(Canada) Dave Barr	70-68-70=208	−2
4	(United States) Rick Fehr	69-67-73=209	−1
T5	(Spain) Seve Ballesteros	71-70-69=210	E
T5	(United States) Tom Kite	69-70-71=210	E
T5	(Zimbabwe) Denis Watson	72-65-73=210	E
T8	(United States) Payne Stewart	70-70-71=211	+1
T8	(United States) Lanny Wadkins	70-72-69=211	+1
T10	(United States) Raymond Floyd	72-67-73=212	+2
T10	(United States) Jay Haas	69-66-77=212	+2
T10	(United States) Fuzzy Zoeller	71-69-72=212	+2

=== Final round ===
Sunday, June 16, 1985

Place	Player	Score	To par	Money ($)
1	(United States) Andy North	70-65-70-74=279	−1	103,000
T2	(Canada) Dave Barr	70-68-70-72=280	E	39,185
T2	(Taiwan) Chen Tze-chung	65-69-69-77=280	E	39,185
T2	(Zimbabwe) Denis Watson	72-65-73-70=280	E	39,185
T5	(Spain) Seve Ballesteros	71-70-69-71=281	+1	18,458
T5	(United States) Payne Stewart	70-70-71-70=281	+1	18,458
T5	(United States) Lanny Wadkins	70-72-69-70=281	+1	18,458
8	(United States) Johnny Miller	74-71-68-69=282	+2	14,921
T9	(United States) Rick Fehr	69-67-73-74=283	+3	12,439
T9	(United States) Corey Pavin	72-68-73-70=283	+3	12,439
T9	(United States) Jack Renner	72-69-72-70=283	+3	12,439
T9	(United States) Fuzzy Zoeller	71-69-72-71=283	+3	12,439

Amateurs: Scott Verplank (+9), Jay Sigel (+22)

==== Scorecard ====
Final round

Hole	1	2	3	4	5	6	7	8	9	10	11	12	13	14	15	16	17	18
Par	4	5	3	4	4	4	4	4	3	4	4	5	3	4	4	4	3	4
(United States) North	−4	−4	−4	−4	−4	−4	−4	−4	−3	−2	−1	−1	−2	−2	−2	−2	−2	−1
(Canada) Barr	−1	−2	−2	−2	−3	−3	−3	−2	−2	−2	−2	−3	−2	−2	−2	−2	−1	E
(Taiwan) Chen	−7	−8	−8	−8	−4	−3	−2	−1	−1	−1	−1	−2	−2	−1	−1	−1	E	E
(Zimbabwe) Watson	+1	+1	+2	+1	E	+1	+1	+1	+1	+1	+1	E	E	E	E	E	E	E
(Spain) Ballesteros	E	E	E	E	E	E	E	+1	+2	+3	+2	+1	+2	+2	+2	+2	+1	+1
(United States) Stewart	+1	−1	−1	−1	−2	−2	−2	−2	−2	−2	−2	−2	−1	E	E	E	E	+1
(United States) Wadkins	+3	+2	+2	+1	+1	+1	+2	+2	+1	+1	+1	+1	E	+1	+1	+1	+2	+1

Cumulative tournament scores, relative to par

Eagle	Birdie	Bogey	Double bogey	Triple bogey+
