= Oakland Hills Country Club =

Golf club in Michigan, United States

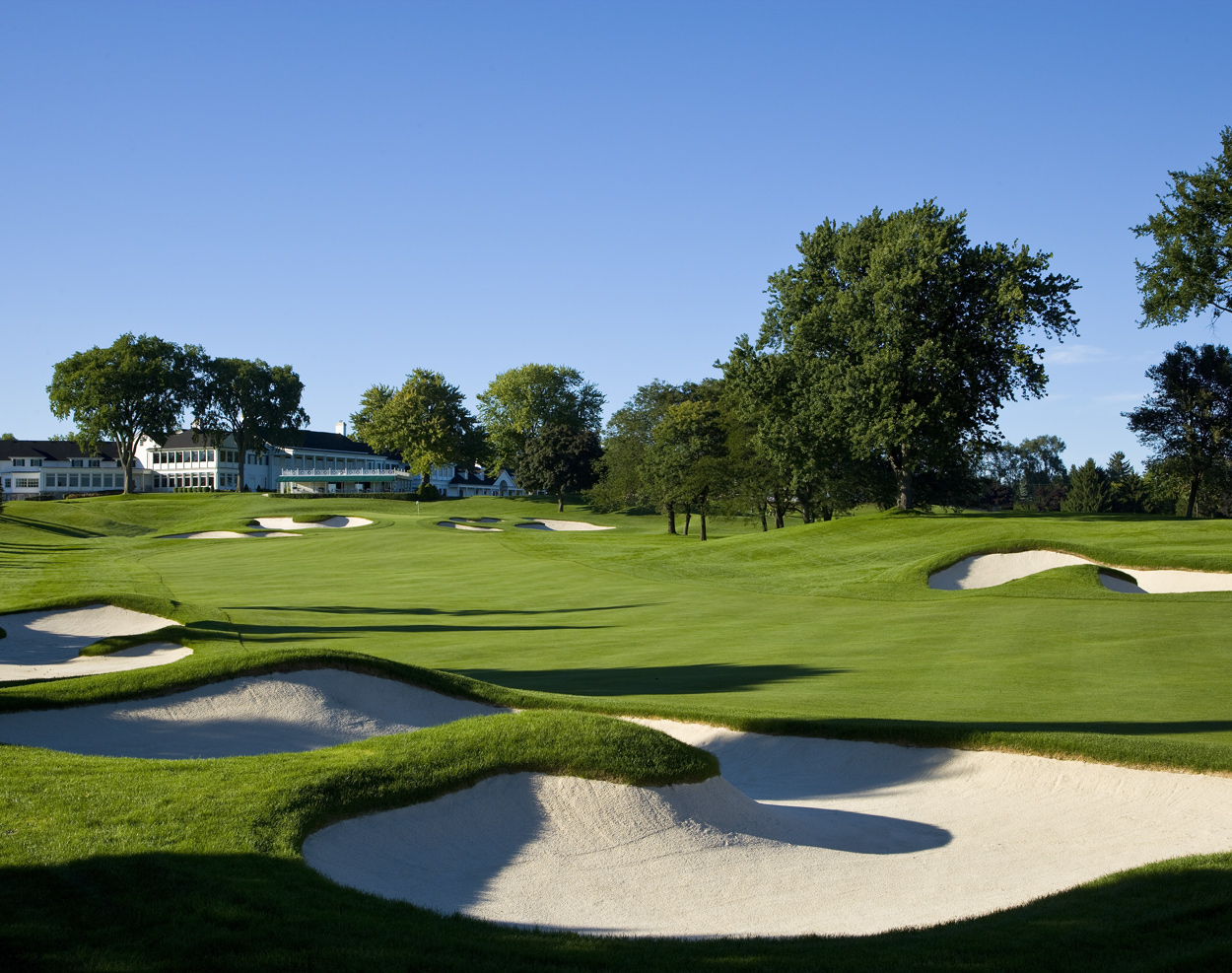

- Location within the United States Location within Michigan
- 42.544°N 83.277°W

Club information
- Location: Bloomfield Township, Oakland County, Michigan
- Elevation: 830 feet (250 m)
- Established: 1916, 110 years ago South Course: 1918; North Course: 1923 (ready for play in 1924)
- Type: Private
- Tota holes: 36
- Greens: Bentgrass
- Fairways: Bentgrass / Poa annua
- Website: oaklandhillscc.com

South Course
- Designed by: Donald Ross
- Par: 72 (70 for majors)
- Length: 7,509 yards (6,866 m)
- Course rating: 77.0
- Slope rating: 145

North Course
- Designed by: Donald Ross
- Par: 70
- Length: 6,908 yards (6,317 m)
- Course rating: 74.6
- Slope rating: 138

Oakland Hills Country Club is a private golf club in the central United States, located in Bloomfield Township, Michigan, a suburb northwest of Detroit. It consists of two 18-hole courses designed by Donald Ross: the South Course (1918) and the North Course (1923).

Oakland Hills has hosted many prestigious professional golf tournaments throughout its history, including six U.S. Opens and three PGA Championships, the 2004 Ryder Cup and the 2002 and 2016 U.S. Amateur on its South Course.

On February 17, 2022, the main building was engulfed in flames. No injuries were reported. The clubhouse was having some flashing fixed when a blowtorch hit a section of the outside wall. The wood structure went up in flames.

== History ==
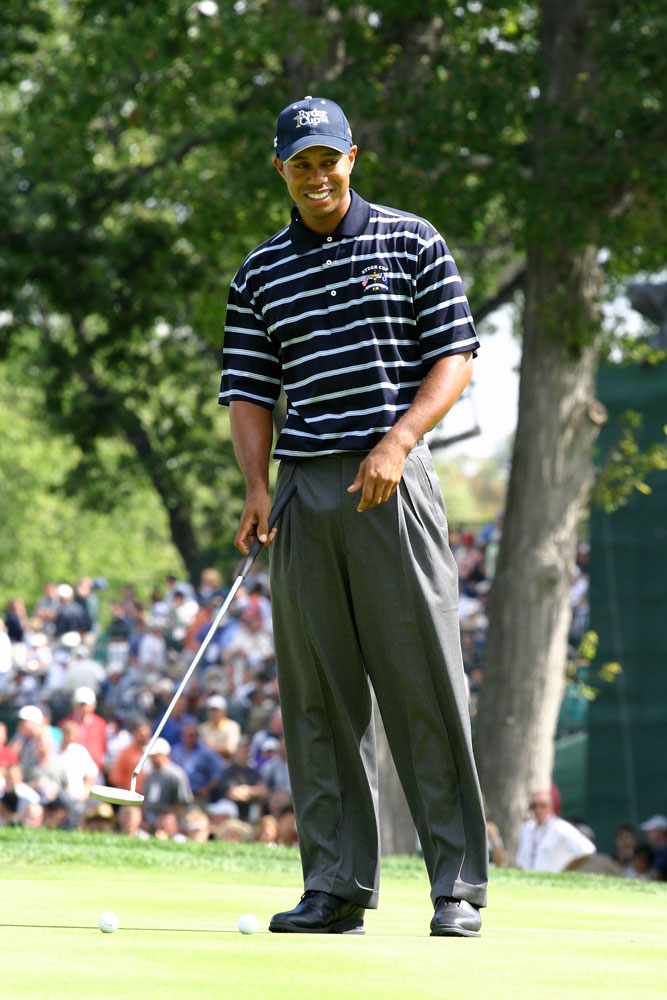
Tiger Woods during a practice round prior to the 2004 Ryder Cup at Oakland Hills

In 1916, two Ford Motor Company executives, advertising head Joseph Mack and chief accountant and first sales manager Norval Hawkins, purchased a parcel of farmland on Maple Road – 15 miles (24 km) northwest of Detroit in Bloomfield Hills. Construction began in 1917 and Mack was elected as the first president of the club. When the South Course of Oakland Hills was formally opened on July 13, 1918, it enjoyed prestige because of its designer - Ross, the foremost golf course architect of his day – and its first club pro, U.S. Open champion Walter Hagen. The clubhouse was the Miller farmhouse on the North side of Maple Road and the old chicken coop served as Hagen's pro shop. One hundred-forty memberships were sold at $250 each.

The current clubhouse was completed and formally opened in August 1922 at a cost of $650,000 unfinished. The original structure had accommodations for 48 overnight guests, as it was not uncommon in that era for members to stay at the Club for weeks at a time. Modern roads and nearby motels obviated the need for overnight accommodations and the need for space to meet the needs of expanded membership saw the last rooms eliminated in a 1968 renovation.

A full social program was in effect in the early days of the club, with informal dances every Wednesday and Saturday night. Hagen, who broke the barriers of social ostracism against golf professionals, attested to the friendly atmosphere that prevailed when he said that the treatment he had received at Oakland Hills had spoiled him and made him accustomed to being treated as any golfer, pro or amateur, should be. Guest play was most popular in the early days. In 1923 there was more guest play on our South Course than any other course in the Midwest.

Work on the North Course began in 1922, completed in late 1923, and ready for play in 1924. For the first several years it was operated as it is today, i.e., a second course for the members. During the depression, however, it became necessary to operate it as North Hills, a semi-private Club open for daily green fee play. It was redesigned by Robert Trent Jones and reestablished as a second private course for the members at the beginning of the 1969 season. The barrier which Maple Road presented between the two courses was effectively overcome by installation of the world's largest arched aluminum pedestrian bridge. The bridge connecting the two courses is 210 feet (64 m) long, 11 feet (3.4 m) wide, and weighs 40,000 pounds (18,000 kg). It was delivered to the site already assembled and erected in less than 2 1/2 hours early one morning.

The first major tournament hosted was the Western Open in 1922 which was won by host pro Mike Brady, who had succeeded Hagen, by ten strokes over runner-up Jock Hutchinson.

Two years later, in 1924, the club played host to the first of six U.S. Opens. This was won by Cyril Walker with a 297 total. Runner-up that year was Bobby Jones, the defending champion, at 300.

The Open returned to Oakland Hills again in 1937 when Ralph Guldahl, then a 24-year-old, won his first of two successive Opens with a 281 total. Two shots back in his oft-denied quest of an Open title was Sam Snead.

Although many tournaments have been held throughout the years at Oakland Hills, the one which gave the course its greatest reputation as "The Monster" was the 1951 Open. The result was a tournament in which only two subpar rounds were shot during the entire 72 hole affair. Ben Hogan won with a total of 287 by shooting a final round 67 after which he was quoted as saying "I am glad I brought this course, this monster, to its knees." He also said that it was "the greatest test of golf I have ever played and the toughest course." Clayton Heafner who had a final round of 69, the only other sub-par of the tournament, finished second two strokes back. There was some comment after the last round of the tournament of the effect that the tee markers had been moved so far forward that last day as to take some of the fairway traps out of play. In any event, the natural result of this extremely difficult Open was that from that point on the USGA no longer permitted the host clubs to control the layout for an Open tournament.

The Club once again hosted the U.S. Open in 1961 when Gene Littler's 281 nosed out Doug Sanders and Bob Goalby by a single stroke. But for bad luck on two holes on the back nine of the closing round, a young Jack Nicklaus may have won.

The next major tournament held at Oakland Hills was the 1964 Carling World Open which was won by Bobby Nichols whose 278 total beat out Arnold Palmer by a single stroke in an exciting finish.

Next in line of major championships hosted by Oakland Hills was the 1972 PGA Championship. The tournament was won by Gary Player with a 281 total, highlighted by a late birdie on the famous 16th hole. Tommy Aaron and Jim Jamieson tied for second.

In 1979, Oakland Hills once again hosted the PGA Championship. According to most golf experts, this Championship drew the largest gallery in the history of golf. During this Championship, the "Monster" yielded a little to sub-par rounds occasioned by soft greens, low rough and superb golf played by an extremely qualified field of top-flight golfers. Nine contestants finished the regulation 72 holes under par, with Graham and Crenshaw both finishing at 272, 8-under-par. In the suspenseful three-hole playoff, Graham sunk putts on the first and second holes to stay alive and clinched his victory with a birdie on the third hole.

In 1981, the Club hosted the second annual U.S. Senior Open. The Championship was eventually won by Arnold Palmer in an 18-hole playoff with Billy Casper and Bob Stone.

In 1985, Oakland Hills became one of only three courses in the country to have hosted the U.S. Open five times. With many of the big names missing the cut, a relative unknown from Taiwan, Chen Tze-chung, found himself leading the field into the final round with the help of a rare double eagle on the second hole during the first round of play. Chen blew a four stroke lead with a quadruple bogey on the fifth hole primarily by hitting his ball twice on one approach shot. Despite a valiant effort on his part in a head-to-head duel with Andy North, the eventual winner, he was never able to recover from his disastrous experience on the fifth hole. In winning his second U.S. Open, North's 279 was the only sub-par total score for the Championship.

In the 1960s and 1970s, the Club spent several million dollars in improvements, renovations, and additions to the Clubhouse and Club property. Extensive renovations to the main Clubhouse were made in 1968 which resulted in the removal of the sleeping rooms and the building of a new ladies locker room on the North end of the second floor of the Club. Rooms for private parties were also added on the second floor, a new Mixed Grille was built on the second floor, a new pro-shop was built, and the Men's Grille was expanded and refurbished. A new pool and pool house opened in 1971. Paddle tennis courts were also added to accommodate the growing popularity of this sport. Before the opening of the 1974 season, the first floor of the Clubhouse was redecorated and a new half-way house was built on the South Course.

In 1976, both the downstairs and upstairs kitchens were completely remodeled and equipped to meet the demands of increased utilization by members of the Club's dining facilities.

In 1982, the Galleria was installed along the walls of the second floor hallway from the Mixed Grille to the Ladies Lounge and Locker area. Over 200 pictures of past tournaments as well as views of the early Clubhouse and grounds were hung.

Remodeling and expansion of the Men's Grille was completed in 1986. At this time major remodeling and decorating brought complete new looks in the Great Room, South Dining Room, Casino Bar as well as the Mixed Grille and Director's Room.

The 1991 U.S. Senior Open started with 37 amateurs and 119 professionals. Michigan's Mike Hill enjoyed the first day lead of 68. The second day of play was highlighted by difficult greens and J. C. Snead took the lead with a 69. On Sunday, Chi-Chi Rodríguez and Jack Nicklaus tied on the 18th green with 282. With the playoff on Monday, Rodríguez finished with 69 to Nicklaus' 65.

Members and guests were introduced to the "Walk of Champions" in 1993. Huge boulders, each 8–10 tons, containing commemorative plaques honoring twelve golfing greats, were installed along the first tee. Extra variegated stones will carry on future winners.

In 1996 the first extra "Stone" was used after the U.S. Open. This Open will long be remembered for Steve Jones winning with a par on the 18th green. Tom Lehman and Davis Love III tied for second. The Open will also be remembered for the storm, which washed out the 18th hole bunker. The grounds crew worked throughout the night draining water from many holes and reconstructed the damaged bunker in time for play on Thursday morning.

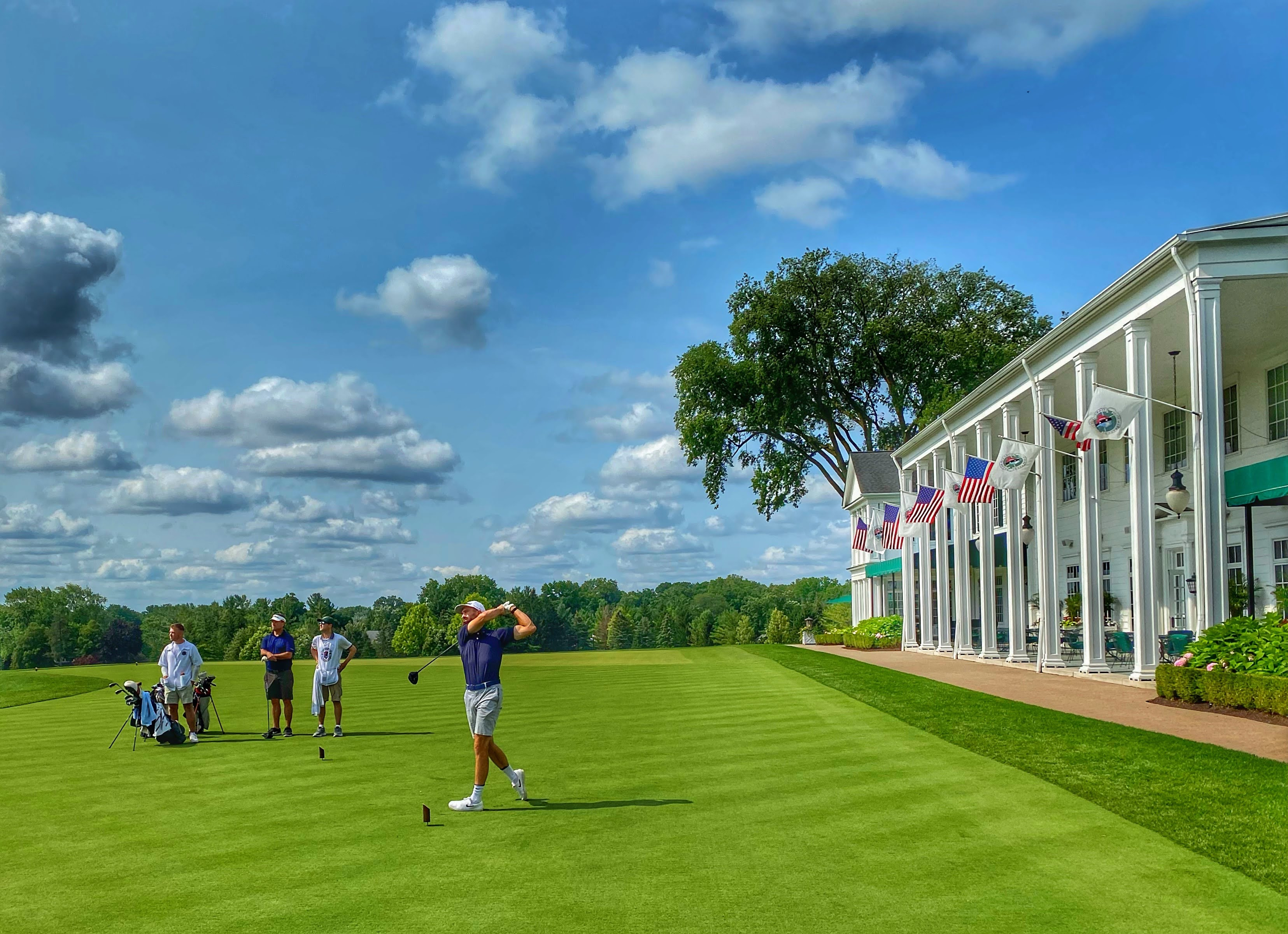
PGA Pro Patrick Wilkes-Krier tees off on the first hole of Oakland Hills South.

In January 1999, the club began a $16.25 million renovation project that included the Pro Shop, Bag Room, and remodeling and restoration of the clubhouse. The club reopened to the membership in May 2000.

Oakland Hills Country Club hosted the 2002 U.S. Amateur won by Ricky Barnes. The club also hosted the 2004 Ryder Cup and the 2008 PGA Championship.

Oakland Hills hosted the 2016 U.S. Amateur, won by Australian Curtis Luck.

Frustrated with not being selected for any major championships for at least two decade period, Oakland Hills decided to undergo a complete renovation of the South Course from the fall of 2019 to July 2021. Led by Gil Hanse, the renovation removed trees, increased the size of greens (while adding the SubAir system), and removed bunkers while increasing the size of the remaining ones. The main goals of the renovation was to make play easier for the membership, while making the course formidable for potential major championships. The United States Golf Association, considering awarding Oakland Hills for their first U.S. Open since 1996, visited multiple times throughout the renovation.

On January 7, 2022, USGA announced Oakland Hills Country Club will host two U.S. Women's Opens in 2031 and 2042.

On February 17, 2022, the clubhouse suffered a major fire.

On March 22, 2022, USGA announced that Oakland Hills Country Club will host two U.S. Opens in 2034 and 2051, along with four additional USGA amateur championships, starting in 2024.

== Scorecards ==
South Course
| Tee | Rating/Slope | 1 | 2 | 3 | 4 | 5 | 6 | 7 | 8 | 9 | Out | 10 | 11 | 12 | 13 | 14 | 15 | 16 | 17 | 18 | In | Total |
| Black | 77.0/145 | 443 | 592 | 216 | 482 | 491 | 361 | 421 | 476 | 253 | 3,735 | 496 | 451 | 580 | 181 | 504 | 396 | 425 | 237 | 504 | 3,774 | 7,509 |
| Gold | 75.0/140 | 433 | 539 | 207 | 449 | 471 | 352 | 377 | 468 | 226 | 3,522 | 477 | 422 | 552 | 170 | 492 | 369 | 420 | 214 | 496 | 3,612 | 7,134 |
| Blue | 73.3/137 | 428 | 511 | 190 | 424 | 430 | 344 | 369 | 460 | 219 | 3,375 | 446 | 415 | 520 | 158 | 472 | 362 | 406 | 192 | 487 | 3,458 | 6,833 |
| White | M:71.8/132 W:78.0/147 | 375 | 478 | 181 | 411 | 421 | 336 | 329 | 414 | 213 | 3,158 | 419 | 388 | 520 | 148 | 453 | 354 | 398 | 178 | 477 | 3,335 | 6,493 |
| Silver | M:69.7/127 W:74.8/139 | 352 | 424 | 164 | 342 | 393 | 292 | 317 | 369 | 167 | 2,820 | 398 | 377 | 485 | 131 | 428 | 284 | 345 | 135 | 456 | 3.039 | 5,859 |
| Green | M:67.0/124 W:72.6/131 | 348 | 402 | 155 | 313 | 340 | 285 | 270 | 369 | 164 | 2,646 | 332 | 347 | 423 | 104 | 395 | 276 | 331 | 129 | 448 | 2,785 | 5,431 |
| Par | (Note: Holes 8 and 18 are played as par 4s in major championships.) | 4 | 5 | 3 | 4 | 4 | 4 | 4 | 5/4 | 3 | 36/35 | 4 | 4 | 5 | 3 | 4 | 4 | 4 | 3 | 5/4 | 36/35 | 72/70 |

North Course
| Tee | Rating/Slope | 1 | 2 | 3 | 4 | 5 | 6 | 7 | 8 | 9 | Out | 10 | 11 | 12 | 13 | 14 | 15 | 16 | 17 | 18 | In | Total |
| Black | 74.6/138 | 352 | 405 | 401 | 206 | 626 | 216 | 427 | 487 | 464 | 3,577 | 208 | 467 | 516 | 172 | 373 | 316 | 420 | 464 | 395 | 3,331 | 6,908 |
| Gold | 73.2/135 | 352 | 389 | 395 | 198 | 601 | 183 | 427 | 452 | 432 | 3,429 | 186 | 440 | 516 | 172 | 348 | 316 | 399 | 437 | 379 | 3,193 | 6,622 |
| Blue | 71.6/132 | 345 | 382 | 388 | 185 | 564 | 173 | 413 | 440 | 396 | 3,286 | 168 | 433 | 506 | 153 | 341 | 308 | 391 | 429 | 378 | 3,101 | 6,387 |
| White | 69.7/131 | 337 | 360 | 367 | 173 | 534 | 146 | 383 | 421 | 384 | 3,105 | 156 | 408 | 486 | 143 | 324 | 291 | 376 | 412 | 335 | 2,931 | 6,036 |
| Silver | M:67.6/127 W:73.6/134 | 298 | 352 | 357 | 132 | 478 | 120 | 373 | 408 | 373 | 2,891 | 147 | 376 | 472 | 99 | 300 | 282 | 320 | 343 | 325 | 2,664 | 5,555 |
| Green | W:70.1/127 | 291 | 319 | 331 | 122 | 474 | 95 | 327 | 340 | 340 | 2,639 | 123 | 370 | 438 | 93 | 222 | 261 | 269 | 343 | 295 | 2,414 | 5,053 |
| Par | | 4 | 4 | 4 | 3 | 5 | 3 | 4 | 4 | 4 | 35 | 3 | 4 | 5 | 3 | 4 | 4 | 4 | 4 | 4 | 35 | 70 |

== Major tournaments hosted ==
| Year | Tournament | Winner | Winning score | Winner's share ($) |
|---|---|---|---|---|
| 1922 | Western Open | (United States) Mike Brady | 291 (+3) | |
| **1924** | U.S. Open | (United States) Cyril Walker | 297 (+9) | 500 |
| 1929 | U.S. Women's Amateur | (United States) Glenna Collett | 4 & 3 | n/a |
| **1937** | U.S. Open | (United States) Ralph Guldahl | 281 (+1) | 1,000 |
| **1951** | U.S. Open | (United States) Ben Hogan | 287 (+7) | 4,000 |
| **1961** | U.S. Open | (United States) Gene Littler | 281 (+1) | 14,000 |
| **1972** | PGA Championship | (South Africa) Gary Player | 281 (+1) | 45,000 |
| **1979** | PGA Championship | (Australia) David Graham | 272 (−8) | 60,000 |
| 1981 | U.S. Senior Open | (United States) Arnold Palmer | 289 (+9) | 26,000 |
| **1985** | U.S. Open | (United States) Andy North | 279 (−1) | 103,000 |
| 1991 | U.S. Senior Open (2) | (United States) Jack Nicklaus | 282 (+2), Playoff | 110,000 |
| **1996** | U.S. Open (6) | (United States) Steve Jones | 278 (−2) | 425,000 |
| 2002 | U.S. Amateur | (United States) Ricky Barnes | 2 & 1 | n/a |
| 2004 | Ryder Cup | Team Europe | 18 1/2–9 1/2 | n/a |
| **2008** | PGA Championship (3) | (Republic of Ireland) Pádraig Harrington | 277 (−3) | 1,350,000 |
| 2016 | U.S. Amateur (2) | (Australia) Curtis Luck | 6 & 4 | n/a |
| 2024 | U.S. Junior Amateur | (United States) Trevor Gutschewski | 4 & 3 | n/a |

Bolded years are major championships on the PGA Tour.
