= Cyril Walker (golfer) =

English professional golfer

Personal information
- Nationality: England; United States
- Born: September 18, 1892 Manchester, England
- Died: August 6, 1948 (aged 55) Hackensack, New Jersey, U.S.
- Weight: 118 lb (54 kg; 8.4 st)

Career
- Sport: Golf
- Status: Professional
- Professional wins: 7

Number of wins by tour
- PGA Tour: 5
- Other: 2

Best results in major championships (wins: 1)
- Masters Tournament: 61st: 1934
- PGA Championship: T3: 1921
- U.S. Open: Won: 1924
- The Open Championship: T18: 1926

Cyril Walker (September 18, 1892 – August 6, 1948) was an English professional golfer born in Manchester who emigrated to the United States in 1914.

== Professional career ==
Walker won the 1924 U.S. Open at Oakland Hills Country Club, while playing out of Englewood Golf Club in New Jersey. He beat defending champion Bobby Jones by three strokes. This was his only top ten finish in seven appearances at the U.S. Open. He was a small man, weighing only 118 pounds (54 kg).

Walker won five PGA events between 1917 and 1924. Walker's slow pace of play, combined with his sometimes-combative personality, eventually made him unpopular with fellow players and tournament sponsors. This hastened his exit from the then-nascent professional golfers' tournament circuit.

In 1928, he became the pro at the Saddle River Golf and Country Club in Paramus, New Jersey. While a club pro at Saddle River in 1933, he was arrested for destroying the signs of a neighboring course.

An alcohol addiction further hastened his downward spiral during the 1930s and he ultimately found himself in a near-destitute condition working as a caddie in Florida at the Miami Beach municipal course in 1940, and later as a dishwasher.

== Death ==
Walker died of pleural pneumonia in a Hackensack, New Jersey jail cell where he had gone for shelter.

== Professional wins (7) ==
=== PGA Tour wins (5) ===
- 1917 (1) International Four-Ball
- 1921 (1) Pennsylvania Open Championship
- 1922 (1) Mobile Country Club
- 1923 (1) Mid-South Amateur-Professional
- 1924 (1) U.S. Open

=== Other wins (2) ===
- 1916 Indiana Open
- 1930 Miami International Four-Ball (with Clarence Gamber)

== Major championships ==
=== Wins (1) ===
Year	Championship	54 holes	Winning score	Margin	Runner-up
1924	U.S. Open	Tied for lead	+9 (74-74-74-75=297)	3 strokes	(United States) Bobby Jones

=== Results timeline ===
Tournament	1916	1917	1918	1919
U.S. Open		NT	NT	
The Open Championship	NT	NT	NT	NT
PGA Championship	QF	NT	NT	

Tournament	1920	1921	1922	1923	1924	1925	1926	1927	1928	1929
U.S. Open		13	T40	23	1	T47	T55			
The Open Championship							T18			
PGA Championship		SF		R16						

Tournament	1930	1931	1932	1933	1934
Masters Tournament	NYF	NYF	NYF	NYF	61
U.S. Open				CUT	
The Open Championship					
PGA Championship		QF			

Win
Top 10
Did not play

NYF = Tournament not yet founded
NT = No tournament
CUT = missed the half-way cut
R64, R32, R16, QF, SF = Round in which player lost in PGA Championship match play
"T" indicates a tie for a place

== See also ==
- List of golfers with most PGA Tour wins
