= Clarence Clark (golfer) =

American professional golfer (1907–1974)

Personal information
- Full name: Clarence E. Clark
- Nationality: United States
- Born: September 22, 1907 Paola, Kansas, U.S.
- Died: September 27, 1974 (aged 67) Abilene, Texas, U.S.

Career
- Sport: Golf
- Status: Professional
- Former tour: PGA Tour
- Professional wins: 8

Number of wins by tour
- PGA Tour: 7
- Other: 1

Best results in major championships
- Masters Tournament: T13: 1937
- PGA Championship: T9: 1933
- U.S. Open: 3rd: 1936
- The Open Championship: DNP

Clarence E. Clark (September 22, 1907 – September 27, 1974) was an American professional golfer.

== Professional career ==
In 1907, Clark was born in Paola, Kansas. He worked as a club professional at many courses in Kansas. These include: Carey Park Golf Course in Hutchinson, Kansas, O'Brien's Golf Center in Wichita, Kansas, and Newton Country Club in Newton, Kansas. In addition, he worked as a pro at McFarlin Golf Club in Tulsa, Oklahoma, Forest Hill Field Club Bloomfield, New Jersey, and Dyess Air Force Base Golf Course and Lazee Tee Golf Center in Abilene, Texas.

Clark also played on the PGA Tour, winning seven times in the 1930s, including the Texas Open and Houston Open on consecutive weeks in 1932. In 1936, he was tied for the lead in the U.S. Open after the first round and finished the tournament tied for third.

== Death ==
Clark died in Abilene, Texas in 1974.

== Professional wins ==
=== PGA Tour wins (7) ===
- 1931 (2) Orlando Open, New Jersey PGA Championship
- 1932 (2) Texas Open, Houston Open
- 1933 (1) New Jersey Open
- 1934 (1) Hazard Kentucky Open
- 1936 (1) Lake Placid Open

=== Other wins ===
- 1930 Oklahoma Open

== Results in major championships ==
Tournament	1929	1930	1931	1932	1933	1934	1935	1936	1937	1938	1939	1940
Masters Tournament	NYF	NYF	NYF	NYF	NYF		T19		T13			
U.S. Open			T36	11	T9	CUT		3	7	CUT		CUT
PGA Championship	R32				R16		R64		R64	R64		

Note: Clark never played in The Open Championship.

Top 10
Did not play

NYF = tournament not yet founded
CUT = missed the half-way cut
"T" indicates a tie for a place
R64, R32, R16, QF, SF = round in which player lost in PGA Championship match play
