= Abe Espinosa =

American golfer (1889–1980)

Personal information
- Full name: Abelard George Espinosa
- Nationality: United States
- Born: February 9, 1889 Monterey, California
- Died: February 13, 1980 (aged 91) San Luis Obispo County, California

Career
- Sport: Golf
- Status: Professional
- Former tour: PGA Tour
- Professional wins: 4

Number of wins by tour
- PGA Tour: 3
- Other: 1

Best results in major championships
- Masters Tournament: T38: 1934
- PGA Championship: T5: 1926, 1931
- U.S. Open: T7: 1924
- The Open Championship: DNP

Abelard George "Abe" Espinosa (February 9, 1889 – February 13, 1980) was an American professional golfer who is best known as the first Hispanic-American to win a significant professional championship.

== Early life ==
In 1889, Espinosa was born in Monterey, California. He was of Mexican-American descent.

Espinosa's younger brother Al (1891–1957) was also a professional golfer; both were known for their dashing, stylish attire on the links.

== Professional career ==
During his career, Espinosa worked primarily as a club professional. He worked at Columbian Golf Club in Oakland, California. Later he worked as Medinah Country Club in Illinois. Later and at Shreveport Country Club in Louisiana, where one of his caddies was future U.S. Open Champion Tommy Bolt.

Espinosa's first PGA Tour win came at the 1928 Western Open. His best finish in a major was a tie for seventh at the 1924 U.S. Open. After his playing days were over, he became involved in golf course architecture and design; his works include Heart River Municipal Golf Course in Dickinson, North Dakota.

== Professional wins (4) ==
=== PGA Tour wins (3) ===
- 1928 Western Open, Chicago Open Championship
- 1931 Texas Open

=== Other wins (1) ===
- 1931 Illinois PGA Championship
