= Al Espinosa =

American professional golfer (1891–1957)

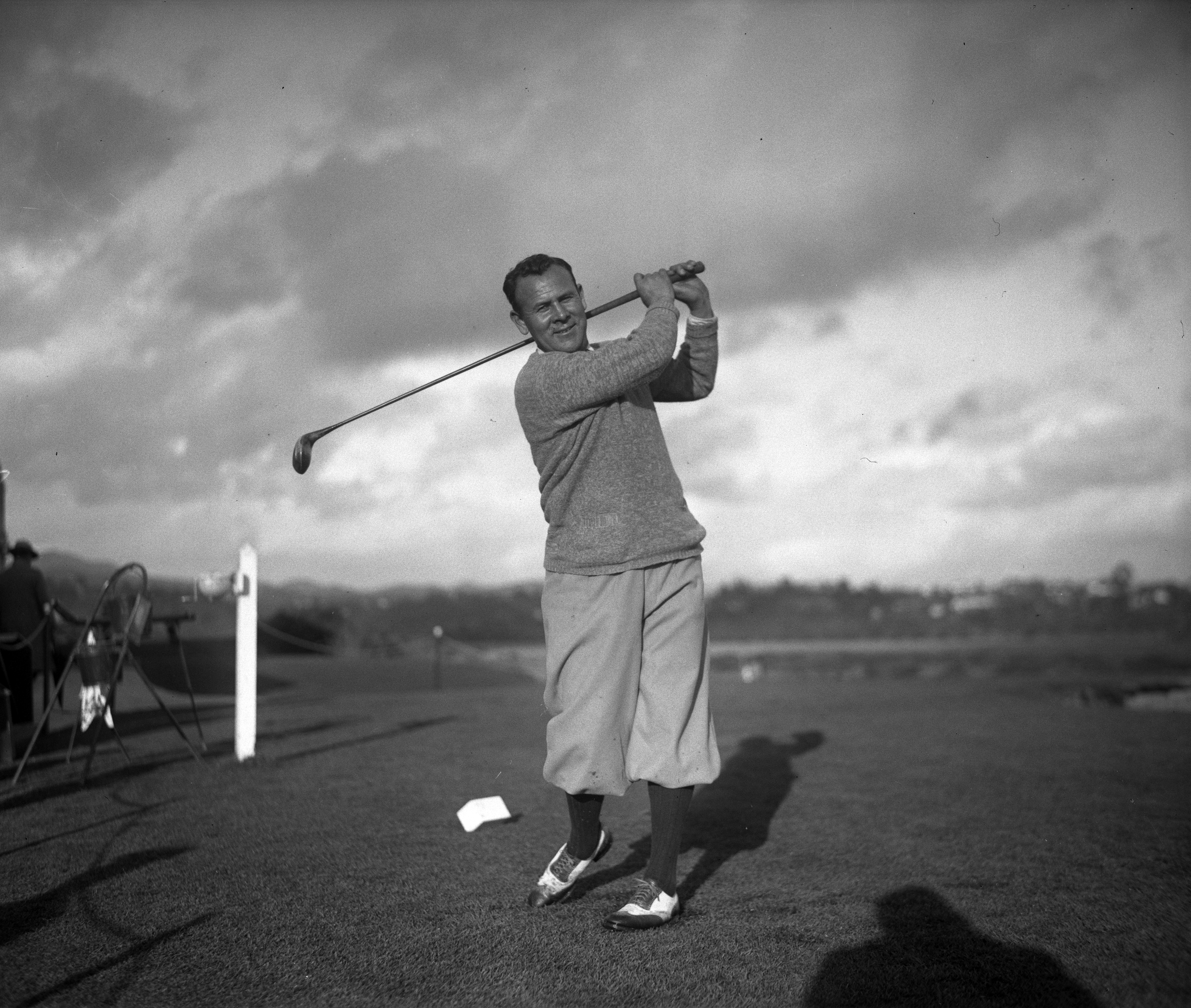
- circa 1920

Personal information
- Full name: Abel Ruben Espinosa
- Nickname: Al
- Born: March 24, 1891 Monterey, California, U.S.
- Died: January 4, 1957 (aged 65) San Francisco, California, U.S.
- Spouse: Josephine
- Children: 1

Career
- Sport: Golf
- Turned professional: 1921
- Former tour: PGA Tour
- Professional wins: 20

Number of wins by tour
- PGA Tour: 8
- Other: 12

Best results in major championships
- Masters Tournament: T7: 1934
- PGA Championship: 2nd: 1928
- U.S. Open: 2nd: 1929
- The Open Championship: T32: 1929

Al Espinosa
- Military career
- Allegiance: United States
- Branch: U.S. Army
- Rank: Corporal
- Conflicts: World War I

Abel Ruben "Al" Espinosa (March 24, 1891 – January 4, 1957) was an American professional golfer.

== Early life ==
Espinosa was born on March 24, 1891, in Monterey, California. He was of Mexican Americans descent. His brother, Abe Espinosa, also became a professional golfer.

Espinosa served in the U.S. Army in World War I.

== Professional career ==
Espinosa won eight times on the PGA Tour in the 1920s and 1930s. He was on the Ryder Cup teams in 1927, 1929, and 1931 (although he did not play in 1927). He lost to Leo Diegel in the PGA Championship finals in 1928. He tied with Bobby Jones in the U.S. Open in 1929 at Winged Foot, but lost by 23 strokes in the 36-hole playoff. He won the Mexican Open four times.

Espinosa won the inaugural Washington Open when he was the Head Professional at Inglewood Golf Club in Seattle, Washington in 1922, and repeated the win in 1923. He served as the Head Professional at Portage Country Club in Akron, Ohio from 1931 through 1944. During his tenure at Portage he won the Ohio Open three times: in 1932, 1933, and 1936. While head pro at Portage Country Club in Akron, Ohio, in the early 1940s, Espinosa hired as his assistant future Masters champion Herman Keiser.

== Personal life ==
In 1957, Espinosa died of cancer at age 65 in San Francisco. and is buried at San Carlos Cemetery in Monterey.

== Awards and honors ==
In 1957, Espinosa was inducted into the Summit County Sports Hall of Fame.

== Professional wins (20) ==
=== PGA Tour wins (8) ===
- 1924 (1) Missouri Open
- 1926 (1) Oklahoma City Open
- 1928 (2) Florida West Coast Open, Mid-America Open
- 1930 (1) Houston Open
- 1932 (1) Ohio Open
- 1933 (1) Ohio Open
- 1935 (1) Indianapolis Open

=== Other wins (12) ===
this list may be incomplete

- 1922 Washington Open
- 1923 Washington Open
- 1925 Chicago District Open Championship
- 1927 Illinois PGA Championship
- 1928 Illinois PGA Championship
- 1930 Illinois PGA Championship
- 1934 Miami International Four-Ball (with Denny Shute)
- 1936 Ohio Open
- 1944 Mexican Open
- 1945 Mexican Open
- 1946 Mexican Open
- 1947 Mexican Open

== Results in major championships ==
Tournament	1924	1925	1926	1927	1928	1929
U.S. Open		T9	T13	T18	T14	2
The Open Championship						T32
PGA Championship	QF	R16	R32	SF	2	QF

Tournament	1930	1931	1932	1933	1934	1935	1936	1937	1938	1939	1940
Masters Tournament	NYF	NYF	NYF	NYF	T7	T17	T15	T29			
U.S. Open	T35	T10	CUT	CUT	T21	T28	CUT			T32	T43
The Open Championship											NT
PGA Championship	QF	R32		R16				R32			R64

Top 10
Did not play

NYF = tournament not yet founded
NT = no tournament
CUT = missed the half-way cut
R64, R32, R16, QF, SF = round in which player lost in PGA Championship match play
"T" indicates a tie for a place

=== Summary ===
Tournament	Wins	2nd	3rd	Top-5	Top-10	Top-25	Events	Cuts made
Masters Tournament	0	0	0	0	1	3	4	4
U.S. Open	0	1	0	1	3	7	14	11
The Open Championship	0	0	0	0	0	0	1	1
PGA Championship	0	1	1	5	7	10	11	11
Totals	0	2	1	6	11	20	30	27

- Most consecutive cuts made – 16 (1924 PGA – 1931 PGA)
- Longest streak of top-10s – 3 (1924 PGA – 1925 PGA)
