= Steve Jones (golfer) =

American professional golfer (born 1958)

Personal information
- Full name: Steven Glen Jones
- Nationality: United States
- Born: December 27, 1958 (age 67) Artesia, New Mexico, U.S.
- Height: 6 ft 4 in (1.93 m)
- Weight: 200 lb (91 kg; 14 st)

Career
- Sport: Golf
- College: University of Colorado
- Turned professional: 1981
- Current tour: PGA Tour Champions
- Former tour: PGA Tour
- Professional wins: 10
- Highest ranking: 14 (February 23, 1997)

Number of wins by tour
- PGA Tour: 8
- European Tour: 1
- Other: 2

Best results in major championships (wins: 1)
- Masters Tournament: T20: 1990
- PGA Championship: T9: 1988
- U.S. Open: Won: 1996
- The Open Championship: T16: 1990

Achievements and awards
- PGA Tour Comeback Player of the Year: 1996

Steven Glen Jones (born December 27, 1958) is an American professional golfer, best known for winning the U.S. Open in 1996.

== Early life and amateur career ==
Jones was born in Artesia, New Mexico. He was a semi-finalist at the U.S. Junior Amateur in 1976. He attended the University of Colorado.

== Professional career ==
=== PGA Tour ===
In 1981, Jones turned professional. In the early years of his professional career, Jones did not have much success. He played the PGA Tour in 1982, but only made three cuts. His first top-10 finish came at the Texas Open in September 1985, and in 1986 he was medalist at the PGA Tour Qualifying Tournament, allowing him to retain his card for the following year.

Jones won on the PGA Tour for the first time at the AT&T Pebble Beach National Pro-Am in 1988. The following year, 1989, was the winningest of his career with three PGA Tour wins. In January, he opened the season with a win in the MONY Tournament of Champions. He won again the next week, in a playoff over Paul Azinger and Sandy Lyle in the Bob Hope Chrysler Classic. In June he captured the Canadian Open with a two-stroke win over Mark Calcavecchia, Mike Hulbert and Clark Burroughs. He finished the season a career-best eighth on the money list.

In November 1991, Jones suffered ligament and joint damage to his left ring finger in a dirtbike accident, and he missed almost three years of play as a professional. He played in only two events in 1994.

Jones began his comeback in earnest in 1995, when he had two top-10 finishes. In 1996, he achieved three top-10 finishes by May. Considered a rank outsider in June 1996, Jones won the U.S. Open which was the only major championship of his career, defeating Tom Lehman and Davis Love III by one stroke. He was also the first sectional qualifier to win the tournament since Jerry Pate in 1976. Afterwards, Jones was selected as the PGA Tour Comeback Player of the Year for 1996 and he played for the United States in the 1996 World Cup of Golf.

Jones won two more PGA Tour events in 1997. In January, he shot 26-under to defeat Jesper Parnevik by an impressive 11 strokes at the Phoenix Open. He followed that in September with his second career win at the Canadian Open, by one stroke over Greg Norman.

In 1998, he won the Quad City Classic, his final PGA Tour victory.

Since 1999, Jones has slipped steadily down the money list. He remained exempt on the PGA Tour through 2006 because a major tournament win carried a 10-year exemption when he won in 1996. He missed part of 2003 and all of 2004 after undergoing surgery for tennis elbow, but starting playing again in 2005.

Jones was a captain's assistant for the United States team at the Ryder Cup in 2004.

In 2007, he played in nine PGA tour events and four Nationwide tour events, making the cut six times, but with no top-25 finishes.

In 2008 and 2009, Jones had surgeries for tennis elbow. He made his first full golf swings in January 2011. In 2011, Jones returned to playing professional golf. In January, Jones played the Bob Hope Classic on the PGA Tour.

=== Champions Tour ===
Jones began playing on the Champions Tour (now PGA Tour Champions) in April 2011, making his debut at the Liberty Mutual Legends of Golf, where he and partner Doug Tewell tied for 10th in the Raphael Division. His best individual effort among his 10 official starts was a T16 at The Senior Open Championship at Walton Heath. In 2012, he played in 12 Champions Tour events, with five top-25 finishes, earnings of $164,934, and a Champions Tour personal best finish of a tie for second at the 2012 Liberty Mutual Legends of Golf. His 11th-place finish at the National Qualifying Tournament earned him a conditional spot on the tour for the following year. In 2013, he played in 15 events with three top-25 finishes and $153,335 in earnings. In 2014, he played 11 events on the Champions Tour, making 9 cuts, and with a best finish T40 at the Pacific Links Hawaii Championship. In 2015, he played 13 events, making all the cuts and posting one top ten, T9 at the Senior PGA Championship. Jones has not played any Champions Tour events in 2016.

His career on the PGA Tour Champions consists of 70 events played, making 66 cuts and two top-10 finishes. His total career earnings are over $800,000.

== Professional wins (10) ==
=== PGA Tour wins (8) ===
Legend
Major championships (1)
Other PGA Tour (7)

| No. | Date | Tournament | Winning score | To par | Margin of victory | Runner(s)-up |
|---|---|---|---|---|---|---|
| 1 | Feb 7, 1988 | AT&T Pebble Beach National Pro-Am | 72-64-70-74=280 | −8 | Playoff | (United States) Bob Tway |
| 2 | Jan 8, 1989 | MONY Tournament of Champions | 69-69-72-69=279 | −9 | 3 strokes | (South Africa) David Frost, (United States) Jay Haas |
| 3 | Jan 15, 1989 | Bob Hope Chrysler Classic | 76-68-67-63-69=343 | −17 | Playoff | (United States) Paul Azinger, (Scotland) Sandy Lyle |
| 4 | Jun 25, 1989 | Canadian Open | 67-64-70-70=271 | −17 | 2 strokes | (United States) Clark Burroughs, (United States) Mark Calcavecchia, (United States) Mike Hulbert |
| 5 | Jun 16, 1996 | U.S. Open | 74-66-69-69=278 | −2 | 1 stroke | (United States) Tom Lehman, (United States) Davis Love III |
| 6 | Jan 26, 1997 | Phoenix Open | 62-64-65-67=258 | −26 | 11 strokes | (Sweden) Jesper Parnevik |
| 7 | Sep 7, 1997 | Bell Canadian Open (2) | 71-68-67-69=275 | −5 | 1 stroke | (Australia) Greg Norman |
| 8 | Jul 12, 1998 | Quad City Classic | 64-65-68-66=263 | −17 | 1 stroke | (United States) Scott Gump |

PGA Tour playoff record (2–1)

| No. | Year | Tournament | Opponent(s) | Result |
|---|---|---|---|---|
| 1 | 1988 | AT&T Pebble Beach National Pro-Am | (United States) Bob Tway | Won with birdie on second extra hole |
| 2 | 1989 | Bob Hope Chrysler Classic | (United States) Paul Azinger, (Scotland) Sandy Lyle | Won with birdie on first extra hole |
| 3 | 1990 | MCI Heritage Golf Classic | (United States) Larry Mize, (United States) Payne Stewart | Stewart won with birdie on second extra hole Jones eliminated by par on first hole |

=== Other wins (2) ===
- 1987 JCPenney Classic (with Jane Crafter)
- 1988 Colorado Open

== Major championships ==
=== Wins (1) ===
| Year | Championship | 54 holes | Winning score | Margin | Runners-up |
|---|---|---|---|---|---|
| 1996 | U.S. Open | 1 shot deficit | −2 (74-66-69-69=278) | 1 stroke | (United States) Tom Lehman, (United States) Davis Love III |

=== Results timeline ===
| Tournament | 1987 | 1988 | 1989 |
|---|---|---|---|
| Masters Tournament | | T30 | T31 |
| U.S. Open | | | T46 |
| The Open Championship | | | CUT |
| PGA Championship | T61 | T9 | T51 |

| Tournament | 1990 | 1991 | 1992 | 1993 | 1994 | 1995 | 1996 | 1997 | 1998 | 1999 |
|---|---|---|---|---|---|---|---|---|---|---|
| Masters Tournament | T20 | CUT | | | | | | CUT | T26 | CUT |
| U.S. Open | T8 | CUT | | | | | 1 | T60 | CUT | CUT |
| The Open Championship | T16 | T64 | | | | | CUT | T48 | T57 | |
| PGA Championship | CUT | | | | | | CUT | T41 | | CUT |

| Tournament | 2000 | 2001 | 2002 | 2003 | 2004 | 2005 | 2006 |
|---|---|---|---|---|---|---|---|
| Masters Tournament | T25 | T27 | | | | | |
| U.S. Open | T27 | T30 | CUT | | | T57 | T32 |
| The Open Championship | T31 | CUT | T43 | | | | |
| PGA Championship | T24 | | | | | | |

Win
Top 10
Did not play

CUT = missed the half way cut
"T" indicates a tie for a place.

=== Summary ===
| Tournament | Wins | 2nd | 3rd | Top-5 | Top-10 | Top-25 | Events | Cuts made |
|---|---|---|---|---|---|---|---|---|
| Masters Tournament | 0 | 0 | 0 | 0 | 0 | 2 | 9 | 6 |
| U.S. Open | 1 | 0 | 0 | 1 | 2 | 2 | 12 | 8 |
| The Open Championship | 0 | 0 | 0 | 0 | 0 | 1 | 9 | 6 |
| PGA Championship | 0 | 0 | 0 | 0 | 1 | 2 | 8 | 5 |
| Totals | 1 | 0 | 0 | 1 | 3 | 7 | 38 | 25 |

- Most consecutive cuts made – 6 (2000 Masters – 2001 U.S. Open)
- Longest streak of top-10s – 1 (three times)

== Results in The Players Championship ==
| Tournament | 1987 | 1988 | 1989 |
|---|---|---|---|
| The Players Championship | T15 | T48 | T41 |

| Tournament | 1990 | 1991 | 1992 | 1993 | 1994 | 1995 | 1996 | 1997 | 1998 | 1999 |
|---|---|---|---|---|---|---|---|---|---|---|
| The Players Championship | T3 | T41 | | | | | T33 | CUT | T25 | CUT |

| Tournament | 2000 | 2001 | 2002 | 2003 | 2004 | 2005 | 2006 |
|---|---|---|---|---|---|---|---|
| The Players Championship | T27 | T50 | CUT | T62 | | T75 | CUT |

Top 10
Did not play

CUT = missed the halfway cut
"T" indicates a tie for a place

== Results in World Golf Championships ==
| Tournament | 1999 |
|---|---|
| Match Play | R16 |
| Championship | |
| Invitational | |

Top 10
Did not play

QF, R16, R32, R64 = Round in which player lost in match play

== U.S. national team appearances ==
Professional

- World Cup: 1996

== See also ==
- Fall 1981 PGA Tour Qualifying School graduates
- 1984 PGA Tour Qualifying School graduates
- 1986 PGA Tour Qualifying School graduates
