= 1924 U.S. Open (golf) =

Coordinates: 42.544°N 83.277°W

Tournament information
- Dates: June 5–6, 1924
- Location: Birmingham, Michigan
- Course(s): Oakland Hills Country Club; South Course
- Organized by: USGA
- Format: Stroke play − 72 holes

Statistics
- Par: 72
- Length: 6,874 yards (6,286 m)
- Field: 84
- Cut: none
- Winner's share: $500

Champion
- (England) Cyril Walker
- 297 (+9)

Location in the United States
Location in Michigan

The 1924 U.S. Open was the 28th U.S. Open, held June 5–6 at Oakland Hills Country Club in Birmingham, Michigan, a suburb northwest of Detroit. Cyril Walker, a relatively unknown Englishman, won his only major title at the South Course, three strokes ahead of runner-up Bobby Jones, the defending champion.

After the first two rounds of play on Thursday, Jones shared the lead with Bill Mehlhorn, with Walker a shot back. Walker shot a third consecutive 74 in the third round to tie Jones after 54 holes, with Mehlhorn one back. Jones and Mehlhorn, playing ahead of Walker in the final round, both played poorly, each carding 78. Leading by three on the 15th, Walker made bogey but then responded with a birdie on 16. He parred the final two holes to secure the championship.

This was the high point of Walker's golf career. He never won another significant title, and it was his only top ten finish in the U.S. Open; his next best finish in a major was the semifinals of the PGA Championship in 1921. A heavy drinker, Walker wound up working as a caddy and a dishwasher; unable to afford a room, he died in a New Jersey jail cell of pneumonia in 1948 at age 56.

This was the first of nine major championships held at the South Course through 2017; six U.S. Opens and three PGA Championships.

== Course layout ==
South Course

Hole	1	2	3	4	5	6	7	8	9	Out	10	11	12	13	14	15	16	17	18	In	Total
Yards	436	490	198	418	407	353	384	450	237	3,403	450	403	552	142	461	412	384	191	476	3,471	6,874
Par	4	5	3	4	4	4	4	4	3	35	4	4	5	3	5	4	4	3	5	37	72

== Round summaries ==
=== First round ===
Thursday, June 5, 1924 (morning)

Place	Player	Score	To par
1	(United States) Bill Mehlhorn	72	E
T2	(United States) Eddie Loos	73	+1
T2	(United States) Dave Robertson	73	+1
T4	(United States) Bobby Jones (a)	74	+2
T4	(United States) Gene Sarazen	74	+2
T4	(United States) Herbert Lagerblade	74	+2
T4	(England) Cyril Walker	74	+2
T8	(United States) Mike Brady	75	+3
T8	(United States) Johnny Golden	75	+3
T8	(United States) Walter Hagen	75	+3
T8	(United States) Willie Ogg	75	+3

=== Second round ===
Thursday, June 5, 1924 (afternoon)

Place	Player	Score	To par
T1	(United States) Bobby Jones (a)	74-73=147	+3
T1	(United States) Bill Mehlhorn	72-75=147	+3
3	(England) Cyril Walker	74-74=148	+4
T4	(Scotland) Bobby Cruickshank	77-72=149	+5
T4	(United States) Dave Robertson	73-76=149	+5
T6	(United States) Walter Hagen	75-75=150	+6
T6	(United States) Macdonald Smith	78-72=150	+6
8	(United States) Abe Espinosa	80-71=151	+7
T9	(United States) Mike Brady	75-77=152	+8
T9	(United States) Tom Kerrigan	75-77=152	+8

=== Third round ===
Friday, June 6, 1924 (morning)

Place	Player	Score	To par
T1	(United States) Bobby Jones (a)	74-73-75=222	+6
T1	(England) Cyril Walker	74-74-74=222	+6
3	(United States) Bill Mehlhorn	72-75-76=223	+7
4	(Scotland) Bobby Cruickshank	77-72-76=225	+9
T5	(United States) Walter Hagen	75-75-76=226	+10
T5	(United States) Dave Robertson	73-76-77=226	+10
7	(United States) Macdonald Smith	78-72-77=227	+11
T8	(United States) Abe Espinosa	80-71-77=228	+12
T8	(United States) Tommy Armour	77-76-75=228	+12
T10	(United States) Peter O'Hara	76-79-74=229	+13
T10	(United States) Mike Brady	75-77-77=229	+13
T10	(United States) Eddie Loos	73-81-75=229	+13

=== Final round ===
Friday, June 6, 1924 (afternoon)

Place	Player	Score	To par	Money ($)
1	(England) Cyril Walker	74-74-74-75=297	+9	500
2	(United States) Bobby Jones (a)	74-73-75-78=300	+12	0
3	(United States) Bill Mehlhorn	72-75-76-78=301	+13	300
T4	(Scotland) Bobby Cruickshank	77-72-76-78=303	+15	150
T4	(United States) Walter Hagen	75-75-76-77=303	+15	150
T4	(United States) Macdonald Smith	78-72-77-76=303	+15	150
T7	(United States) Abe Espinosa	80-71-77-77=305	+17	85
T7	(United States) Peter O'Hara	76-79-74-76=305	+17	85
9	(United States) Mike Brady	75-77-77-77=306	+18	75
T10	(United States) Chick Evans (a)	77-77-76-77=307	+19	0
T10	(United States) Eddie Loos	73-81-75-78=307	+19	63
T10	(United States) Dave Robertson	73-76-77-81=307	+19	63

Amateurs: Jones (+12), Evans (+19), Guilford (+29), Sweet (+55).
