= List of U.S. Open (golf) champions =

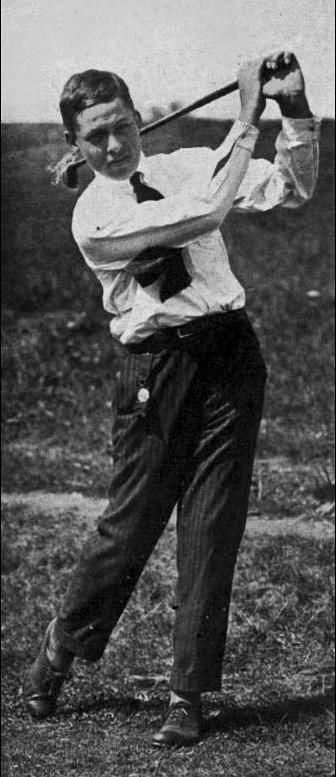
Bobby Jones was a four-time U.S. Open Champion in 1923, 1926, 1929, and 1930.

The U.S. Open is an annual golf competition established in 1895, with Horace Rawlins winning the inaugural championship. It is run by the United States Golf Association (USGA). The championship was not held from 1917 to 1918 or from 1942 to 1945 due to World War I and World War II respectively.

The U.S. Open is currently the third of four major championships to be played each year. U.S. Open champions are automatically invited to play in the other three majors (the Masters, the Open Championship (British Open), and the PGA Championship) for the next five years, and earn a ten-year exemption from qualifying for the U.S. Open. They also receive membership on the PGA Tour for the following five seasons and invitations to The Players Championship for the five years following their victories. The champion receives a gold champion's medal, and the U.S. Open Championship Cup, which the winner is allowed to keep for a year.

Willie Anderson, Bobby Jones, Ben Hogan and Jack Nicklaus hold the record for the most U.S. Open victories, with four victories each. Anderson holds the record for most consecutive wins with three (1903–05). Hale Irwin is the oldest winner of the U.S. Open: he was 45 years and 15 days old when he won in 1990. The youngest winner of the U.S. Open is John McDermott who was 19 years, 10 months and 14 days old when he won in 1911. Rory McIlroy holds the record for the lowest aggregate score in 2011 at 268. Rory McIlroy and Brooks Koepka share the record for the lowest score in relation to par with their winning scores of –16.

The U.S. Open has been won wire-to-wire by eight golfers on nine occasions: 1914 by Walter Hagen, 1921 by Jim Barnes, 1953 by Hogan, 1970 by Tony Jacklin, 2000 and 2002 by Tiger Woods, 2011 by McIlroy, 2014 by Martin Kaymer, and 2026 by Wyndham Clark. Eight others have led wire-to-wire in nine tournaments if ties after a round are counted: Willie Anderson in 1903, Alex Smith in 1906, Chick Evans in 1916, Tommy Bolt in 1958, Nicklaus in 1972 and 1980, Hubert Green in 1977, Payne Stewart in 1991, and Retief Goosen in 2001.

== Champions ==
=== By year ===
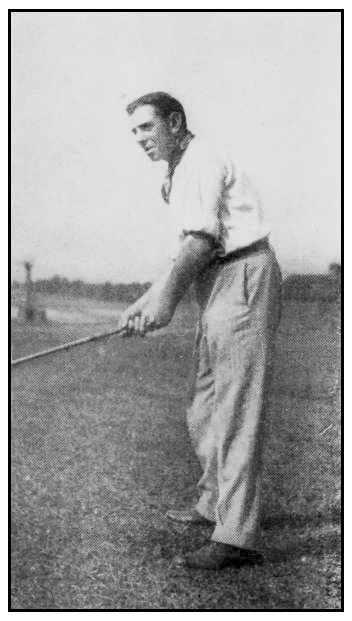
Willie Anderson, four-time U.S. Open Champion in 1901, 1903, 1904, and 1905, which he is the only golfer to win three straight U.S. Opens

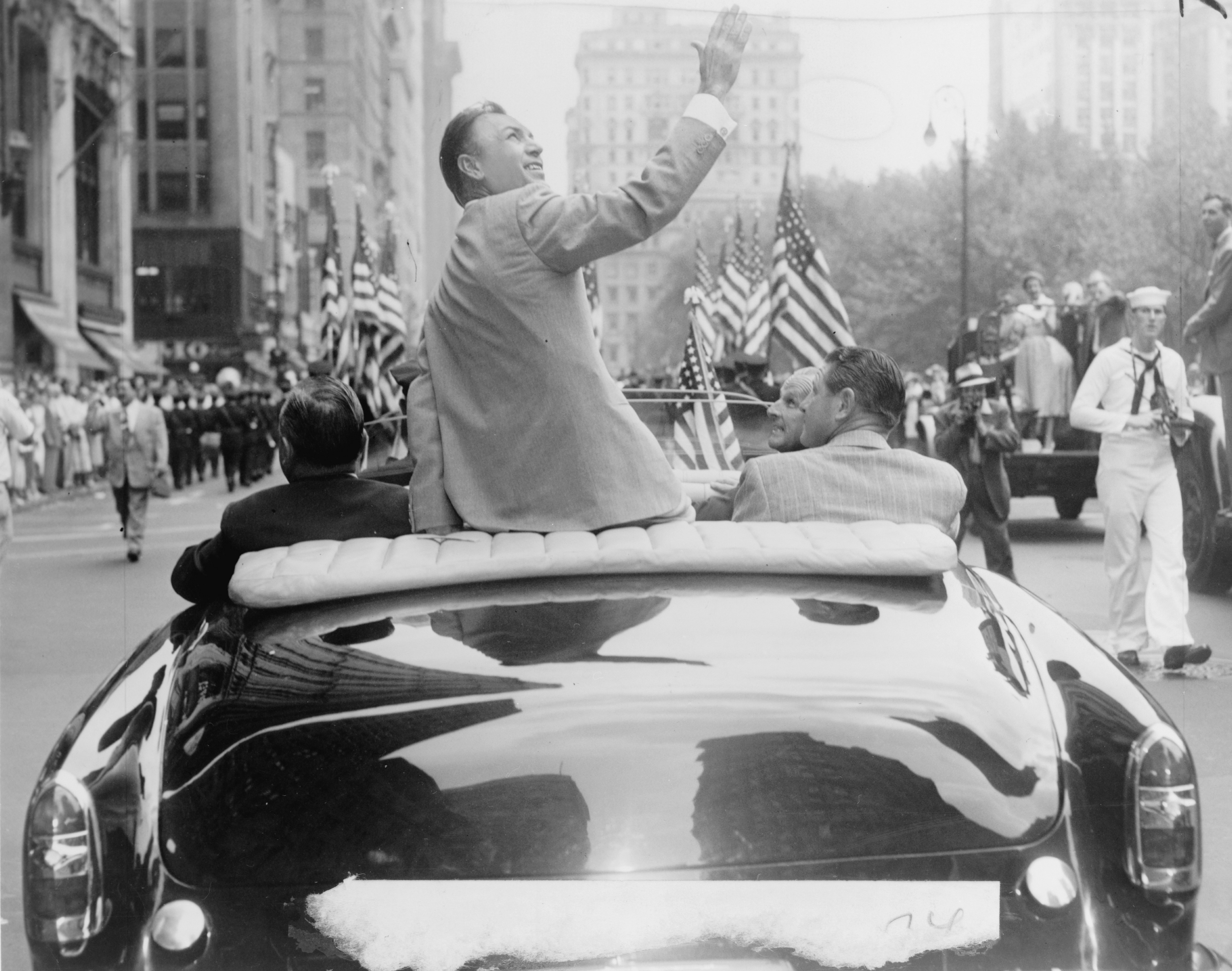
Ben Hogan, four-time U.S. Open Champion in 1948, 1950, 1951, and 1953. He is one of six champions to win wire-to-wire with his victory in 1953.

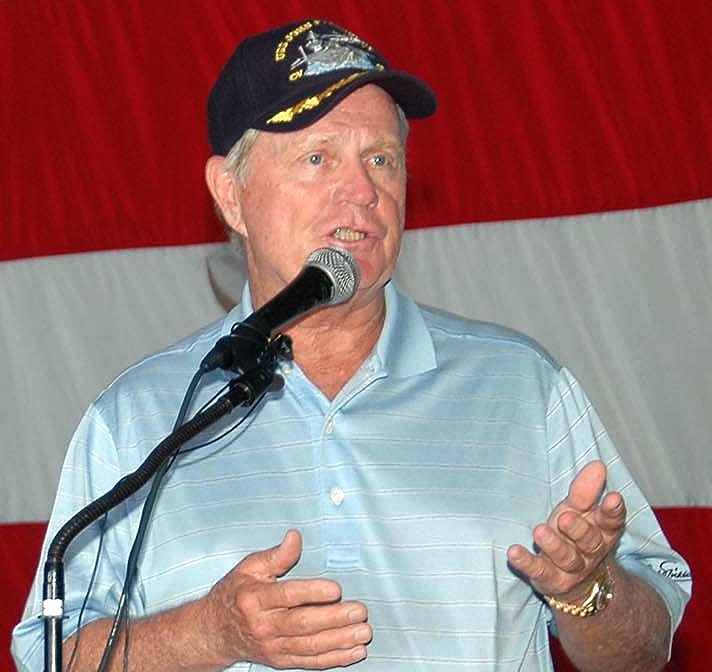
Jack Nicklaus, four-time U.S. Open Champion in 1962, 1967, 1972, and 1980.

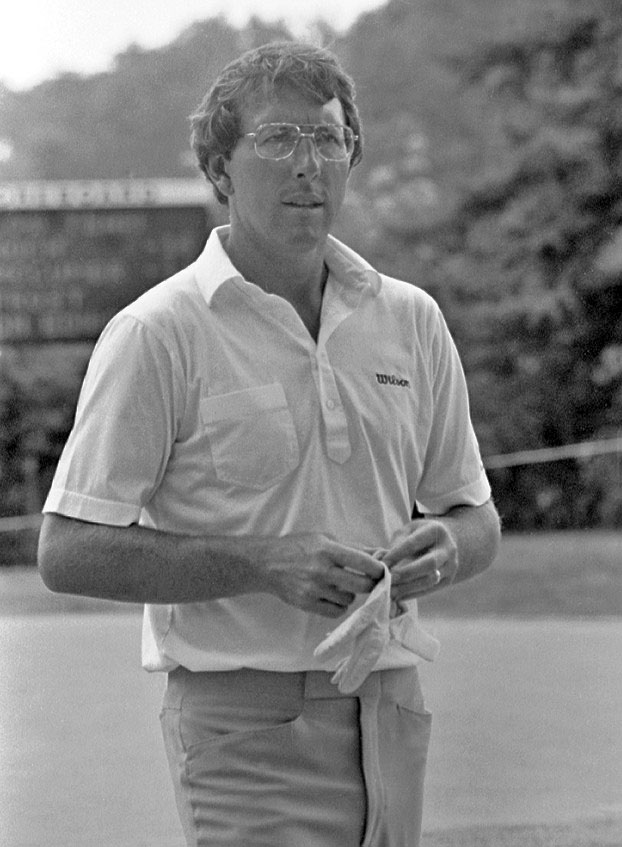
Hale Irwin, three-time U.S. Open Champion in 1974, 1979 and 1990.

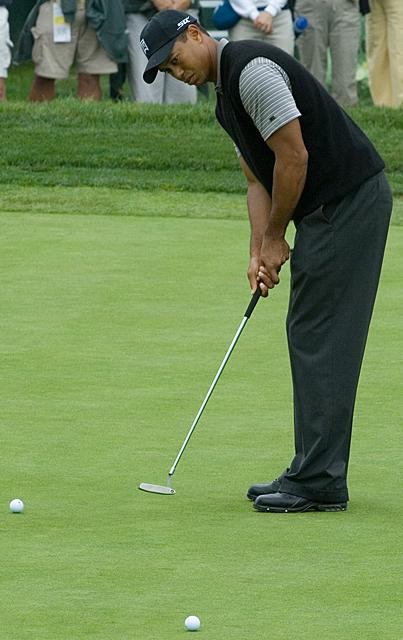
Tiger Woods, three-time U.S. Open Champion in 2000, 2002, and 2008. He is one of six champions to win wire-to-wire with his victory in 2000 and 2002. Woods is the only champion in U.S. Open history to accomplish it twice.

Key
(n/a)	Information not available
†	Tournament won in a playoff
*	Tournament won by an amateur
‡	Tournament won by an amateur in a playoff

U.S. Open champions
Year	Country	Champion	Course	Location	Total score	To par^{[a]}
1895	England	Horace Rawlins^{[b]}	Newport Country Club	Newport, Rhode Island	173	n/a
1896	Scotland	James Foulis^{[b]}	Shinnecock Hills	Shinnecock Hills, New York	152	n/a
1897	England	Joe Lloyd^{[b]}	Chicago Golf Club	Wheaton, Illinois	162	n/a
1898	Scotland	Fred Herd	Myopia Hunt Club	South Hamilton, Massachusetts	328	n/a
1899	Scotland	Willie Smith	Baltimore Country Club	Lutherville, Maryland	315	n/a
1900	Jersey	Harry Vardon	Chicago Golf Club	Wheaton, Illinois	313	n/a
1901	Scotland	Willie Anderson†^{[c]}	Myopia Hunt Club	South Hamilton, Massachusetts	331	n/a
1902	Scotland	Laurie Auchterlonie	Garden City Golf Club	Garden City, New York	307	n/a
1903	Scotland	Willie Anderson†^{[d]}	Baltusrol Golf Club	Springfield, New Jersey	307	n/a
1904	Scotland	Willie Anderson	Glen View Club	Golf, Illinois	303	n/a
1905	Scotland	Willie Anderson	Myopia Hunt Club	South Hamilton, Massachusetts	314	n/a
1906	Scotland	Alex Smith	Onwentsia Club	Lake Forest, Illinois	295	n/a
1907	Scotland	Alec Ross	Philadelphia Cricket Club	Philadelphia, Pennsylvania	302	n/a
1908	Scotland	Fred McLeod†^{[e]}	Myopia Hunt Club	South Hamilton, Massachusetts	322	n/a
1909	England	George Sargent	Englewood Golf Club	Englewood, New Jersey	290	+2
1910	Scotland	Alex Smith†^{[f]}	Philadelphia Cricket Club	Philadelphia, Pennsylvania	298	+6
1911	United States	John McDermott†^{[g]}	Chicago Golf Club	Wheaton, Illinois	307	+3
1912	United States	John McDermott	Country Club of Buffalo	Buffalo, New York	294	+6
1913	United States	Francis Ouimet‡^{[h]}	The Country Club	Brookline, Massachusetts	304	+12
1914	United States	Walter Hagen	Midlothian Country Club	Midlothian, Illinois	290	+2
1915	United States	Jerome Travers*	Baltusrol Golf Club	Springfield, New Jersey	297	+1
1916	United States	Chick Evans*	The Minikahda Club	Minneapolis, Minnesota	286	−2
1917	—	None^{[i]}	—	—	—	—
1918	—	None	—	—	—	—
1919	United States	Walter Hagen†^{[j]}	Brae Burn Country Club	West Newton, Massachusetts	301	+17
1920	Jersey	Ted Ray	Inverness Club	Toledo, Ohio	295	+7
1921	England	Jim Barnes	Columbia Country Club	Chevy Chase, Maryland	289	+9
1922	United States	Gene Sarazen	Skokie Country Club	Glencoe, Illinois	288	+8
1923	United States	Bobby Jones‡^{[n]}^{[k]}	Inwood Country Club	Inwood, New York	296	+8
1924	England	Cyril Walker	Oakland Hills	Bloomfield Hills, Michigan	297	+9
1925	Scotland	Willie Macfarlane†^{[l]}	Worcester Country Club	Worcester, Massachusetts	291	+7
1926	United States	Bobby Jones*	Scioto Country Club	Columbus, Ohio	293	+5
1927	United States	Tommy Armour†^{[m]}	Oakmont Country Club	Oakmont, Pennsylvania	301	+13
1928	United States	Johnny Farrell†^{[n]}	Olympia Fields	Olympia Fields, Illinois	294	+10
1929	United States	Bobby Jones‡^{[n]}^{[o]}	Winged Foot Golf Club	Mamaroneck, New York	294	+6
1930	United States	Bobby Jones*	Interlachen Country Club	Edina, Minnesota	287	−1
1931	United States	Billy Burke†^{[p]}	Inverness Club	Toledo, Ohio	292	+8
1932	United States	Gene Sarazen	Fresh Meadow Country Club	Great Neck, New York	286	+6
1933	United States	Johnny Goodman*	North Shore Country Club	Glenview, Illinois	287	−1
1934	United States	Olin Dutra	Merion Golf Club	Ardmore, Pennsylvania	293	+13
1935	United States	Sam Parks, Jr.	Oakmont Country Club	Oakmont, Pennsylvania	299	+11
1936	United States	Tony Manero	Baltusrol Golf Club	Springfield, New Jersey	282	−6
1937	United States	Ralph Guldahl	Oakland Hills	Bloomfield Hills, Michigan	281	−7
1938	United States	Ralph Guldahl	Cherry Hills	Cherry Hills Village, Colorado	284	E
1939	United States	Byron Nelson†^{[q]}	Philadelphia Country Club	Philadelphia, Pennsylvania	284	+8
1940	United States	Lawson Little†^{[r]}	Canterbury Golf Club	Beachwood, Ohio	287	−1
1941	United States	Craig Wood	Colonial Country Club	Fort Worth, Texas	284	+4
1942	—	None^{[s]}	—	—	—	—
1943	—	None	—	—	—	—
1944	—	None	—	—	—	—
1945	—	None	—	—	—	—
1946	United States	Lloyd Mangrum†^{[t]}	Canterbury Golf Club	Beachwood, Ohio	284	−4
1947	United States	Lew Worsham†^{[u]}	St. Louis Country Club	St. Louis, Missouri	282	−2
1948	United States	Ben Hogan	Riviera Country Club	Pacific Palisades, California	276	−8
1949	United States	Cary Middlecoff	Medinah Country Club	Medinah, Illinois	286	+2
1950	United States	Ben Hogan†^{[v]}	Merion Golf Club	Ardmore, Pennsylvania	287	+7
1951	United States	Ben Hogan	Oakland Hills	Bloomfield Hills, Michigan	287	+7
1952	United States	Julius Boros	Northwood Club	Dallas, Texas	281	+1
1953	United States	Ben Hogan	Oakmont Country Club	Oakmont, Pennsylvania	283	−5
1954	United States	Ed Furgol	Baltusrol Golf Club	Springfield, New Jersey	284	+4
1955	United States	Jack Fleck†^{[w]}	Olympic Club	San Francisco, California	287	+7
1956	United States	Cary Middlecoff	Oak Hill Country Club	Rochester, New York	281	+1
1957	United States	Dick Mayer†^{[x]}	Inverness Club	Toledo, Ohio	282	+2
1958	United States	Tommy Bolt	Southern Hills	Tulsa, Oklahoma	283	+3
1959	United States	Billy Casper	Winged Foot Golf Club	Mamaroneck, New York	282	+2
1960	United States	Arnold Palmer	Cherry Hills	Cherry Hills Village, Colorado	280	−4
1961	United States	Gene Littler	Oakland Hills	Bloomfield Hills, Michigan	281	+1
1962	United States	Jack Nicklaus†^{[y]}	Oakmont Country Club	Oakmont, Pennsylvania	283	−1
1963	United States	Julius Boros†^{[z]}	The Country Club	Brookline, Massachusetts	293	+9
1964	United States	Ken Venturi	Congressional Country Club	Bethesda, Maryland	278	−2
1965	South Africa	Gary Player†^{[aa]}	Bellerive Country Club	St. Louis, Missouri	282	+2
1966	United States	Billy Casper†^{[bb]}	Olympic Club	San Francisco, California	278	−2
1967	United States	Jack Nicklaus	Baltusrol Golf Club	Springfield, New Jersey	275	−5
1968	United States	Lee Trevino	Oak Hill Country Club	Rochester, New York	275	−5
1969	United States	Orville Moody	Champions Golf Club	Houston, Texas	281	+1
1970	England	Tony Jacklin	Hazeltine National Golf Club	Chaska, Minnesota	281	−7
1971	United States	Lee Trevino†^{[cc]}	Merion Golf Club	Ardmore, Pennsylvania	280	E
1972	United States	Jack Nicklaus	Pebble Beach	Pebble Beach, California	290	+2
1973	United States	Johnny Miller	Oakmont Country Club	Oakmont, Pennsylvania	279	−5
1974	United States	Hale Irwin	Winged Foot Golf Club	Mamaroneck, New York	287	+7
1975	United States	Lou Graham†^{[dd]}	Medinah Country Club	Medinah, Illinois	287	+3
1976	United States	Jerry Pate	Atlanta Athletic Club	Duluth, Georgia	277	−3
1977	United States	Hubert Green	Southern Hills	Tulsa, Oklahoma	278	−2
1978	United States	Andy North	Cherry Hills	Cherry Hills Village, Colorado	285	+1
1979	United States	Hale Irwin	Inverness Club	Toledo, Ohio	284	E
1980	United States	Jack Nicklaus	Baltusrol Golf Club	Springfield, New Jersey	272	−8
1981	Australia	David Graham	Merion Golf Club	Ardmore, Pennsylvania	273	−7
1982	United States	Tom Watson	Pebble Beach	Pebble Beach, California	282	−6
1983	United States	Larry Nelson	Oakmont Country Club	Oakmont, Pennsylvania	280	−4
1984	United States	Fuzzy Zoeller†^{[ee]}	Winged Foot Golf Club	Mamaroneck, New York	276	−4
1985	United States	Andy North	Oakland Hills	Bloomfield Hills, Michigan	279	−1
1986	United States	Raymond Floyd	Shinnecock Hills	Shinnecock Hills, New York	279	−1
1987	United States	Scott Simpson	Olympic Club	San Francisco, California	277	−3
1988	United States	Curtis Strange†^{[ff]}	The Country Club	Brookline, Massachusetts	278	−6
1989	United States	Curtis Strange	Oak Hill Country Club	Rochester, New York	278	−2
1990	United States	Hale Irwin†^{[gg]}	Medinah Country Club	Medinah, Illinois	280	−8
1991	United States	Payne Stewart†^{[hh]}	Hazeltine National Golf Club	Chaska, Minnesota	282	−6
1992	United States	Tom Kite	Pebble Beach	Pebble Beach, California	285	−3
1993	United States	Lee Janzen	Baltusrol Golf Club	Springfield, New Jersey	272	−8
1994	South Africa	Ernie Els†^{[ii]}	Oakmont Country Club	Oakmont, Pennsylvania	279	−5
1995	United States	Corey Pavin	Shinnecock Hills	Shinnecock Hills, New York	280	E
1996	United States	Steve Jones	Oakland Hills	Bloomfield Hills, Michigan	278	−2
1997	South Africa	Ernie Els	Congressional Country Club	Bethesda, Maryland	276	−4
1998	United States	Lee Janzen	Olympic Club	San Francisco, California	280	E
1999	United States	Payne Stewart	Pinehurst Resort	Pinehurst, North Carolina	279	−1
2000	United States	Tiger Woods	Pebble Beach	Pebble Beach, California	272	−12
2001	South Africa	Retief Goosen†^{[jj]}	Southern Hills	Tulsa, Oklahoma	276	−4
2002	United States	Tiger Woods	Bethpage Black	Farmingdale, New York	277	−3
2003	United States	Jim Furyk	Olympia Fields	Olympia Fields, Illinois	272	−8
2004	South Africa	Retief Goosen	Shinnecock Hills	Shinnecock Hills, New York	276	−4
2005	New Zealand	Michael Campbell	Pinehurst Resort	Pinehurst, North Carolina	280	E
2006	Australia	Geoff Ogilvy	Winged Foot Golf Club	Mamaroneck, New York	285	+5
2007	Argentina	Ángel Cabrera	Oakmont Country Club	Oakmont, Pennsylvania	285	+5
2008	United States	Tiger Woods†^{[kk]}	Torrey Pines	San Diego, California	283	−1
2009	United States	Lucas Glover	Bethpage Black	Farmingdale, New York	276	−4
2010	Northern Ireland	Graeme McDowell	Pebble Beach Golf Links	Pebble Beach, California	284	E
2011	Northern Ireland	Rory McIlroy	Congressional Country Club	Bethesda, Maryland	268	−16
2012	United States	Webb Simpson	Olympic Club	San Francisco, California	281	+1
2013	England	Justin Rose	Merion Golf Club	Ardmore, Pennsylvania	281	+1
2014	Germany	Martin Kaymer	Pinehurst Resort	Pinehurst, North Carolina	271	−9
2015	United States	Jordan Spieth	Chambers Bay	University Place, Washington	275	−5
2016	United States	Dustin Johnson	Oakmont Country Club	Oakmont, Pennsylvania	276	−4
2017	United States	Brooks Koepka	Erin Hills	Erin, Wisconsin	272	−16
2018	United States	Brooks Koepka	Shinnecock Hills	Shinnecock Hills, New York	281	+1
2019	United States	Gary Woodland	Pebble Beach Golf Links	Pebble Beach, California	271	−13
2020	United States	Bryson DeChambeau	Winged Foot Golf Club	Mamaroneck, New York	274	−6
2021	Spain	Jon Rahm	Torrey Pines	San Diego, California	278	−6
2022	England	Matt Fitzpatrick	The Country Club	Brookline, Massachusetts	274	−6
2023	United States	Wyndham Clark	Los Angeles Country Club	Los Angeles, California	270	−10
2024	United States	Bryson DeChambeau	Pinehurst Resort	Pinehurst, North Carolina	274	−6
2025	United States	J. J. Spaun	Oakmont Country Club	Oakmont, Pennsylvania	279	−1
2026	United States	Wyndham Clark	Shinnecock Hills	Shinnecock Hills, New York	276	−4

=== Multiple champions ===
U.S. Open multiple champions
Golfer	Total	Years
Willie Anderson (SCO)	4	1901, 1903, 1904, 1905
Bobby Jones (a) (USA)	4	1923, 1926, 1929, 1930
Ben Hogan (USA)	4	1948, 1950, 1951, 1953
Jack Nicklaus (USA)	4	1962, 1967, 1972, 1980
Hale Irwin (USA)	3	1974, 1979, 1990
Tiger Woods (USA)	3	2000, 2002, 2008
Alex Smith (SCO)	2	1906, 1910
John McDermott (USA)	2	1911, 1912
Walter Hagen (USA)	2	1914, 1919
Gene Sarazen (USA)	2	1922, 1932
Ralph Guldahl (USA)	2	1937, 1938
Cary Middlecoff (USA)	2	1949, 1956
Julius Boros (USA)	2	1952, 1963
Billy Casper (USA)	2	1959, 1966
Lee Trevino (USA)	2	1968, 1971
Andy North (USA)	2	1978, 1985
Curtis Strange (USA)	2	1988, 1989
Ernie Els (RSA)	2	1994, 1997
Lee Janzen (USA)	2	1993, 1998
Payne Stewart (USA)	2	1991, 1999
Retief Goosen (RSA)	2	2001, 2004
Brooks Koepka (USA)	2	2017, 2018
Bryson DeChambeau (USA)	2	2020, 2024
Wyndham Clark (USA)	2	2023, 2026

=== Champions by nationality ===
U.S. Open champions by nationality
Nationality	Wins	Winners
United States	90	62
Scotland	13	9
England	8	8
South Africa	5	3
Jersey	2	2
Australia	2	2
Northern Ireland	2	2
New Zealand	1	1
Argentina	1	1
Germany	1	1
Spain	1	1

== Notes ==
- ^{a} Par is a predetermined number of strokes that a golfer should require to complete a hole, a round (the sum of the total pars of the played holes), or a tournament (the sum of the total pars of each round). E stands for even, which means the tournament was completed in the predetermined number of strokes.
- ^{b} The Championship was played over 36 holes.
- ^{c} Willie Anderson won in a playoff against Alex Smith.
- ^{d} Willie Anderson won in a playoff against David Brown.
- ^{e} Fred McLeod won in a playoff against Willie Smith.
- ^{f} Alex Smith won in a playoff against John McDermott and Macdonald Smith.
- ^{g} John McDermott won in a playoff against Mike Brady and George Simpson.
- ^{h} Francis Ouimet won in a playoff against Harry Vardon and Ted Ray.
- ^{i} The U.S. Open was not held from 1917 to 1918 because of World War I.
- ^{j} Walter Hagen won in a playoff against Mike Brady.
- ^{k} Bobby Jones won in a playoff against Bobby Cruickshank.
- ^{l} Willie Macfarlane won in a playoff against Bobby Jones.
- ^{m} Tommy Armour won in a playoff against Harry Cooper.
- ^{n} Johnny Farrell won in a playoff against Bobby Jones.
- ^{o} Bobby Jones won in a playoff against Al Espinosa.
- ^{p} Billy Burke won in a playoff against George von Elm.
- ^{q} Byron Nelson won in a playoff against Craig Wood and Denny Shute.
- ^{r} Lawson Little won in a playoff against Gene Sarazen.
- ^{s} The U.S. Open was not held from 1942 to 1945 because of World War II.
- ^{t} Lloyd Mangrum won in a playoff against Vic Ghezzi and Byron Nelson.
- ^{u} Lew Worsham won in a playoff against Sam Snead.
- ^{v} Ben Hogan won in a playoff against Lloyd Mangrum and George Fazio.
- ^{w} Jack Fleck won in a playoff against Ben Hogan.
- ^{x} Dick Mayer won in a playoff against Cary Middlecoff.
- ^{y} Jack Nicklaus won in a playoff against Arnold Palmer.
- ^{z} Julius Boros won in a playoff against Jacky Cupit and Arnold Palmer.
- ^{aa} Gary Player won in a playoff against Kel Nagle.
- ^{bb} Billy Casper won in a playoff against Arnold Palmer.
- ^{cc} Lee Trevino won in a playoff against Jack Nicklaus.
- ^{dd} Lou Graham won in a playoff against John Mahaffey.
- ^{ee} Fuzzy Zoeller won in a playoff against Greg Norman.
- ^{ff} Curtis Strange won in a playoff against Nick Faldo.
- ^{gg} Hale Irwin won in a playoff against Mike Donald.
- ^{hh} Payne Stewart won in a playoff against Scott Simpson.
- ^{ii} Ernie Els won in a playoff against Loren Roberts and Colin Montgomerie.
- ^{jj} Retief Goosen won in a playoff against Mark Brooks.
- ^{kk} Tiger Woods won in a playoff against Rocco Mediate.
