= John Jones (golfer) =

English golfer

Personal information
- Full name: John Jones
- Born: 22 February 1863 Hoylake, Cheshire, England
- Died: 16 June 1921 (aged 58) Lancaster, Pennsylvania, U.S.

Career
- Sport: Golf
- Status: Professional

Best results in major championships
- Masters Tournament: DNP
- PGA Championship: DNP
- U.S. Open: 5th: 1908
- The Open Championship: DNP

John Jones (22 February 1863 – 16 June 1921) was an English professional golfer who played in the late 19th and early 20th century. He had two top-10 finishes in the U.S. Open.

== Early life ==
Jones was born in Hoylake, Cheshire, England in 1863 and emigrated to the United States in 1897. His wife Ellen Maria (née Roberts) joined him the next year. There are few references to him before he emigrated, although he did play in the 1895 Irish Championship Meeting Professional Tournament at Royal Portrush Golf Club, losing to David Herd in the first round. In America Jones took a job as the head professional at Myopia Hunt Club until 1912. He would put his "home course advantage" to good use when the USGA selected Myopia to host four U.S. Opens between 1898 and 1908.

== Golf career ==
=== 1898 U.S. Open ===
Jones tied for eighth place in the 1898 U.S. Open, held at Myopia Hunt Club in South Hamilton, Massachusetts. His scores of 83-84-90-90=347 put him in a tie with three other players, one of which was Herbert Leeds, the designer of the course. The other two players tied on 347 were Robert McAndrews and Bernard Nicholls. None of the four players won any prize money. Fred Herd (brother of Sandy Herd) won the event—his only major championship victory—by 7 shots from Alex Smith.

=== 1908 U.S. Open ===
The 1908 U.S. Open—once again contested at the Myopia Hunt Club—featured strong winds in the first two rounds that plagued many of the players, but Jones managed his game well under the difficult circumstances. His score of 162 after the conclusion of the second round put him in second place alone, trailing Willie Smith (who was on 159) by only 3 strokes. Jones posted rounds of 81-81-87-82=331 and finished in fifth place, winning $70 in prize money. Fred McLeod won the tournament in a playoff over Smith.

At the age of 50 Jones played in the qualifying round of the 1913 Open Championship at his original home club, Royal Liverpool Golf Club, Hoylake. He played on the third day of qualifying, scored 80 and 79 and missed the qualifying mark by two strokes. He was representing Owasco County Club, New York.

== Death and legacy ==
Jones died on 16 June 1921 in Lancaster, Pennsylvania, although his gravestone is in Hamilton, Massachusetts.

== Results in major championships ==
Tournament	1898	1896	1900	1901	1902	1903	1904	1905	1906	1907	1908
U.S. Open	T8	DNP	DNP	T12	42	DNP	DNP	T32	DNP	DNP	5

Note: Jones played only in the U.S. Open.

DNP = Did not play
T = Tied for a place
Yellow background for top-10
