= Peter Robertson (golfer) =

Scottish golfer

Personal information
- Nationality: Scotland
- Born: c. 1883 Scotland

Career
- Sport: Golf
- Status: Professional

Best results in major championships
- Masters Tournament: DNP
- PGA Championship: DNP
- U.S. Open: T3: 1905
- The Open Championship: DNP

Peter Robertson (born c. 1883) was a Scottish professional golfer who played in the early 20th century. He had four top-10 finishes in the U.S. Open, a tie for third place in the 1905 U.S. Open being his best performance.

== Early life ==
Robertson was born circa 1883 in Scotland.

== Golf career ==
After emigrating from Scotland to the United States, he took up a position at a golf club in Buffalo, New York, in 1905. In 1913, when he played in the U.S. Open at Brookline, he was professional at the Fall River Country Club in Fall River, Massachusetts. By 1922 he was posted at Yahnundasis Golf Club in New Hartford, New York, where he advertised his services as a leading professional and offered, among other things, golf lessons.

=== 1905 U.S. Open ===
The 1905 U.S. Open was the 11th U.S. Open, held September 21–22 at Myopia Hunt Club in South Hamilton, Massachusetts, northeast of Boston. Willie Anderson won his third consecutive U.S. Open title, and his record fourth overall, two strokes ahead of runner-up Alex Smith.

==== Details of play ====
Robertson, playing out of Buffalo, New York, finished tied third with Percy Barrett. He carded rounds of 79-80-81-77=317 and won $113 in prize money. Smith led Anderson by a shot heading to the final round, but a third consecutive round of 80 dropped him back to second place. Anderson closed with rounds of 76 and 77 to post a 314 total, two strokes ahead of Smith. Scoring conditions at Herbert Leeds-designed Myopia Hunt Club were so difficult that no player broke 75 in any round.

Playing conditions were even more difficult in the 1901 U.S. Open at Myopia Hunt Club when no players were able to break 80.

== Death and legacy ==
The date of birth and date of death of Robertson are unknown. Robertson is best remembered for having four top-10 finishes in the U.S. Open, including a T3 finish in 1905.

== Results in major championships ==
Tournament	1904	1905	1906	1907	1908	1909	1910	1911	1912	1913
U.S. Open	T29	T3	T13	T5	T6	T20	T32	T9	T28	T21

Note: Robertson played only in the U.S. Open.

"T" indicates a tie for a place
Yellow background for top-10
