= Herbert Leeds =

American sportsman and golf course architect

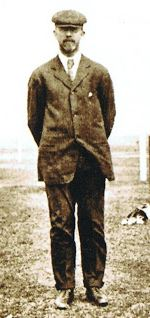
- Leeds, c. 1896

Personal information
- Full name: Herbert Corey Leeds
- Nickname: Papa
- Nationality: United States
- Born: January 30, 1855 Boston, Massachusetts, U.S.
- Died: September 29, 1930 (aged 75) Hamilton, Massachusetts, U.S.

Career
- Sport: Golf
- College: Harvard University
- Status: Amateur

Best results in major championships
- Masters Tournament: DNP
- PGA Championship: DNP
- U.S. Open: T7: 1898
- The Open Championship: DNP

Herbert Corey Leeds (January 30, 1855 – September 29, 1930) was an American amateur golfer, yachtsman, and golf course architect. He designed the Bass Rocks golf course and Myopia Hunt Club golf course. Leeds tied for eighth place in the 1898 U.S. Open.

== Early life ==
Leeds was born in Boston, Massachusetts, on January 30, 1855. Leeds was born into a wealthy family and was a life-long sportsman, being adroit at both sailing and golf.

He graduated from Harvard University where, in addition to completing his Bachelor of Arts studies in 1877, he played baseball and football. While at Harvard, he was a member of Delta Kappa Epsilon (aka The Dickey Club).

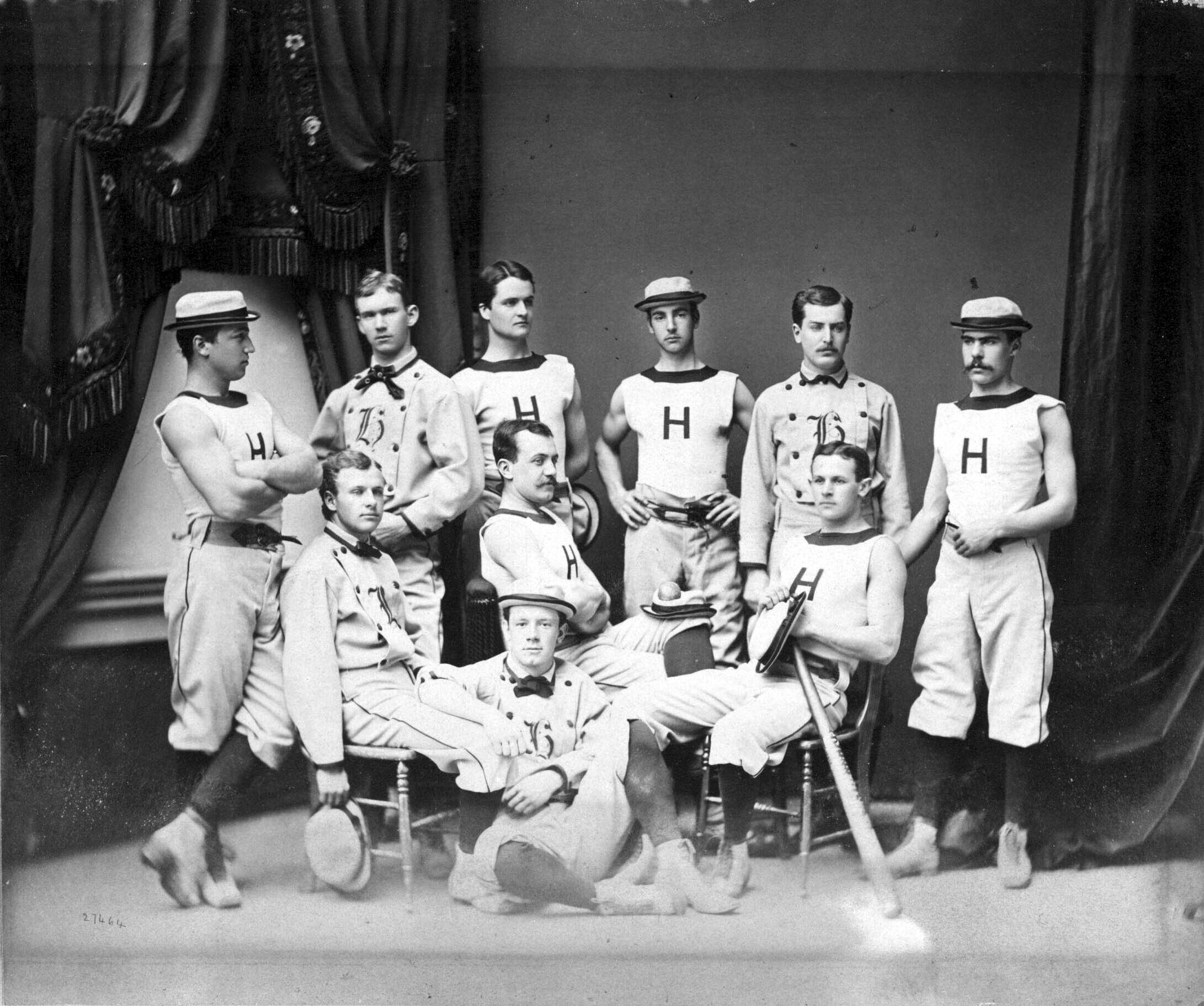
Leeds, who graduated with the Harvard class of 1877, stands back row far left. Future major league pitcher Jim Tyng stands back row second from right.

== Career ==
=== Sports ===
Leeds was an amateur golfer. He tied for eighth place in the 1898 U.S. Open held at Myopia Hunt Club in South Hamilton, Massachusetts, a golf course of his own design. The U.S. Open was played at the Myopia Hunt Club four times, in 1898, 1901, 1905, and 1908.

He was a member of the United States Golf Association executive committee in 1905.

=== Sailing ===
Leeds was a crewmen for the International Cup. He was on the Vigilant in 1893, the Defender in 1895. In 1899, he was the advisor to C. Oliver Iselin of the Columbia A. He wrote the book, The Log of the Columbia.

=== Architect ===
It was no accident that Leeds played so well at Myopia Hunt Club—he designed the course himself in 1894 and worked there for thirty years.

His course at Myopia Hunt Club measured 6,335 yards and within the confines of the course Leeds made certain that pars would not be easy, let alone birdies. Golfers were challenged with myriad features on the course such as tall mounds, numerous deep sand traps, long blind carries, deep swales, and extremely quick greens. For good measure Leeds added multi-tiered greens and deep gnarly rough.

To further menace the players' wayward shots, Leeds added a pond and a paddock. The golf course was so difficult that in the 1901 U.S. Open not a single professional in the field was able to break 80 in any round. Willie Anderson's 331 for four rounds is a record that has stood for 114 years and counting and remains the highest winning score ever in the U.S. Open.

Leeds designed several golf courses, including the private Bass Rocks Golf Club in Gloucester, Massachusetts, and the Kebo Valley Club in Bar Harbor, Maine. He also designed the Palmetto Golf Club in Aiken, South Carolina, completed in 1895.

== Personal life ==
Leeds died in Boston on September 29, 1930, at the age of 75.
