= Willie Hoare =

American golfer (1876–1955)

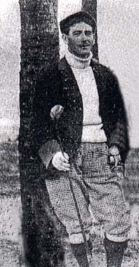
- Hoare, c. 1895

Personal information
- Full name: William Vincent Hoare
- Nationality: England; United States
- Born: 27 May 1876 England
- Died: 1955 (aged 78-79) Pinellas County, Florida
- Spouse: Bertha M. Weidinger

Career
- Sport: Golf
- Status: Professional

Best results in major championships
- Masters Tournament: DNP
- PGA Championship: DNP
- U.S. Open: 5th: 1897
- The Open Championship: DNP

William Vincent Hoare (27 May 1876 – 1955) was an American professional golfer of English descent. Hoare finished in fifth place in the 1897 U.S. Open and placed tied for sixth in the 1898 U.S. Open, held at Myopia Hunt Club in South Hamilton, Massachusetts. He was one of the founding members of the PGA of America, representing the Central States Section.

== Early life ==
Hoare was born in England on 27 May 1876. At age 21 he emigrated to the United States sailing aboard the RMS Aurania from Liverpool and arrived in New York on 4 June 1896. On 26 May 1906 he married Bertha Marie Weidinger in Chicago, Illinois. In 1896 and 1897 he served as the head professional of the Philadelphia Cricket Club.

== Golf career ==
=== U.S. Open ===
In the 1896 U.S. Open, Hoare posted rounds of 90-81=171 finishing alone in 15th place. He improved on that effort when he carded rounds of 82-87=169 and finished in fifth place at the 1897 U.S. Open, winning $10 in prize money. He had rounds of 84-84-87-87=342 and tied for sixth place in the 1898 U.S. Open, held at Myopia Hunt Club in South Hamilton, Massachusetts, winning no prize money for his effort.

Hoare was a long hitter of the golf ball. In a driving contest prior to the 1899 U.S. Open he won with a long drive measuring 269 yards 7 feet 6 inches. His drive was unusually long for the day as the gutta-percha ball was still in use at that time. Henry Gullane finished second with a drive of 264 yards 2 feet 9 inches.

=== Club professional ===
One of his first jobs as a club professional was at the Philadelphia Cricket Club in 1896. In 1915 he was the manager of the Hot Springs Golf and Country Club in Hot Springs, Arkansas, but by September 1918, near the conclusion of World War I, he was posted at the Omaha Country Club in Omaha, Nebraska. Later, in 1921, he was playing out of the Tedesco Country Club in Marblehead, Massachusetts.

=== PGA of America founding member ===
He was one of the founding members of the PGA of America in 1916 and later worked as an executive for the Wilson Sporting Goods company. He was a member of the PGA's first executive committee and served as a vice-president representing the Central States Section while serving as a professional in Memphis, Tennessee. He also worked for the Spalding company and was a prolific club maker, with unique markings on the clubs of his design.

=== Golf club patent ===
On 2 September 1941 he was issued a patent, number 2,254,528, for a new golf club design. He had first applied for the patent on 21 September 1939.

== Death and legacy ==
Hoare died in 1955 in Pinellas County, Florida.

== Results in major championships ==
Tournament	1896	1897	1898	1899
U.S. Open	15	5	T6	?

Note: Hoare played only in the U.S. Open.

"T" indicates a tie for a place
? = unknown
Yellow background for top-10
