= Robert McAndrews =

Scottish golfer

Personal information
- Full name: Robert G. McAndrews
- Nationality: Scotland
- Born: Scotland

Career
- Sport: Golf
- Status: Professional

Best results in major championships
- Masters Tournament: DNP
- PGA Championship: DNP
- U.S. Open: T8: 1898
- The Open Championship: DNP

Robert G. McAndrews was a Scottish professional golfer. McAndrews placed tied for seventh in the 1898 U.S. Open, held at Myopia Hunt Club in South Hamilton, Massachusetts.
