= 1908 U.S. Open (golf) =

Coordinates: 42.609°N 70.859°W

Tournament information
- Dates: August 27–29, 1908
- Location: South Hamilton, Massachusetts
- Course: Myopia Hunt Club
- Organized by: USGA
- Format: Stroke play − 72 holes

Statistics
- Field: 84, 48 after cut
- Cut: 183
- Winner's share: $300

Champion
- (Scotland) Fred McLeod
- 322

Location in the United States
Location in Massachusetts

The 1908 U.S. Open was the fourteenth U.S. Open, held August 27–29 at Myopia Hunt Club in South Hamilton, Massachusetts, northeast of Boston. Fred McLeod defeated 1899 champion Willie Smith in an 18-hole playoff to win his only major title.

High winds on Thursday caused scores in the first two rounds to soar, with only two players managing to break 80. Willie Smith carded rounds of 77-82 for a three-stroke lead over Myopia club pro John Jones, with brother Alec Smith four back and Fred McLeod five behind.

On Friday, Smith struggled to an 85 in the third round in the morning but still held the lead by one over McLeod and two over Alex. In the final round that afternoon, McLeod tied for lowest score of the tournament by carding a 77, while Smith managed a 78 to force a playoff.

In the playoff on Saturday, McLeod and Smith were even through 13 holes, but McLeod took the lead at the 14th after Smith missed a par putt. McLeod dominated the rest of the way, going 1-under on the last five holes to shoot a 77 to Smith's 83. McLeod only broke 80 in one round of the tournament, while Smith and Gilbert Nicholls were the only players to shoot in the 70s twice. The winning score of 322 was the third-highest in U.S. Open history.

== Round summaries ==
=== First round ===
Thursday, August 27, 1908 (morning)

Place	Player	Score
1	(Scotland) Willie Smith	77
2	(Scotland) Alex Smith	80
3	(England) John Jones	81
T4	(Scotland) Jock Hutchison	82
T4	(Scotland) Fred McLeod	82
T6	(England) Herbert Barker	84
T6	(United States) Richard Kimball	84
T8	(Scotland) Willie Anderson	85
T8	(Scotland) Laurie Auchterlonie	85
T8	(United States) Alex Campbell	85
T8	(United States) Tom McNamara	85

=== Second round ===
Thursday, August 27, 1908 (afternoon)

Place	Player	Score
1	(Scotland) Willie Smith	77-82=159
2	(England) John Jones	81-81=162
3	(Scotland) Alex Smith	80-83=163
4	(Scotland) Fred McLeod	82-82=164
T5	(Scotland) Jock Hutchison	82-84=166
T5	(England) Gilbert Nicholls	89-77=166
T7	(Scotland) Jack Hobens	86-81=167
T7	(United States) Tom McNamara	85-82=167
T9	(Scotland) Laurie Auchterlonie	85-83=168
T9	(Scotland) Alex Campbell	85-83=168

=== Third round ===
Friday, August 28, 1908 (morning)

Place	Player	Score
1	(Scotland) Willie Smith	77-82-85=244
2	(Scotland) Fred McLeod	82-82-81=245
3	(Scotland) Alex Smith	80-83-83=246
4	(England) John Jones	81-81-87=249
5	(Scotland) Peter Robertson	89-84-77=250
T6	(Scotland) Willie Anderson	85-86-80=251
T6	(Scotland) Laurie Auchterlonie	85-83-83=251
8	(Scotland) Jack Hobens	86-81-85=252
T9	(Scotland) Jock Hutchison	82-84-87=253
T9	(United States) Richard Kimball	84-86-83=253
T9	(United States) Tom McNamara	85-82-86=253

=== Final round ===
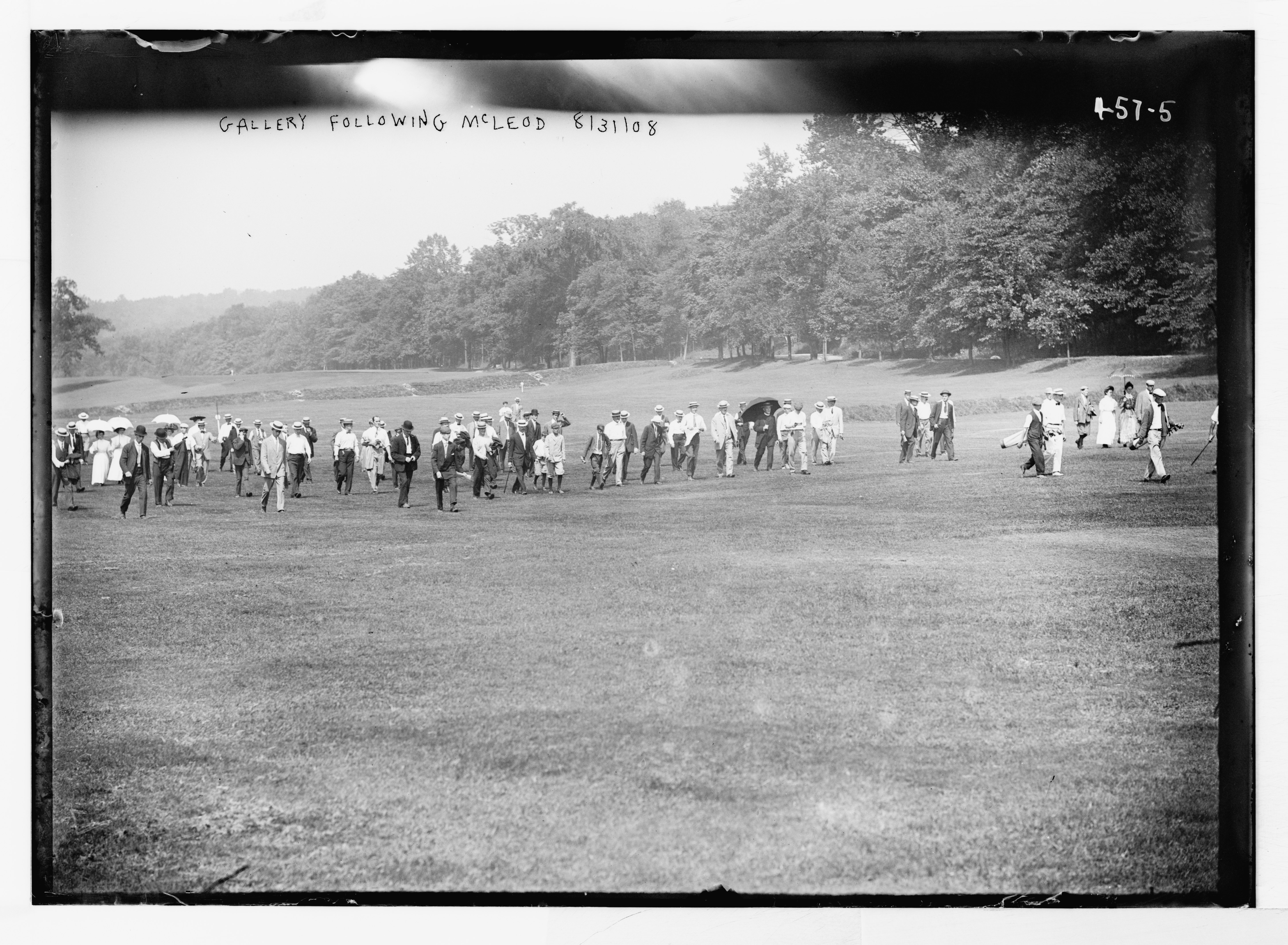
Gallery following McLeod, likely at 1908 U.S. Open

Friday, August 28, 1908 (afternoon)

Place	Player	Score	Money ($)
T1	(Scotland) Fred McLeod	82-82-81-77=322	Playoff
T1	(Scotland) Willie Smith	77-82-85-78=322	Playoff
3	(Scotland) Alex Smith	80-83-83-81=327	100
4	(Scotland) Willie Anderson	85-86-80-79=330	80
5	(England) John Jones	81-81-87-82=331	70
T6	(Scotland) Jack Hobens	86-81-85-81=333	45
T6	(Scotland) Peter Robertson	89-84-77-83=333	45
T8	(England) Percy Barrett	94-80-86-78=338	28
T8	(Scotland) Jock Hutchison	82-84-87-85=338	28
T10	(United States) Richard Kimball	84-86-83-86=339	0
T10	(United States) Tom McNamara	85-82-86-86=339	0

Amateurs: Travis (347), Hylan (356), J. Anderson (357).

=== Playoff ===
Saturday, August 29, 1908

Place	Player	Score	Money ($)
1	(Scotland) Fred McLeod	39-38=77	300
2	(Scotland) Willie Smith	38-45=83	150
