= 1901 U.S. Open (golf) =

Coordinates: 42.609°N 70.859°W

Tournament information
- Dates: June 14–17, 1901
- Location: South Hamilton, Massachusetts
- Course: Myopia Hunt Club
- Organized by: USGA
- Format: Stroke play − 72 holes

Statistics
- Length: 6,130 yards (5,605 m)
- Field: 54
- Cut: none
- Winner's share: $200

Champion
- (Scotland) Willie Anderson
- 331, playoff

Location in the United States
Location in Massachusetts

The 1901 U.S. Open was the seventh U.S. Open, held June 14–17 at Myopia Hunt Club in South Hamilton, Massachusetts, northeast of Boston. Willie Anderson won the first of his four U.S. Open titles in a playoff over Alex Smith.

Smith led after the first two rounds on Friday at 164, with Anderson three strokes back in third place. After the third round on Saturday morning, Stewart Gardner led at 249, with Anderson a stroke behind and Smith one back in third at 251. Garder had an 85 in the afternoon and fell to fourth. Both Anderson and Smith posted total scores of 331, the highest winning score in U.S. Open history, with Smith narrowly missing a putt at the 18th to win the championship in regulation.

The playoff, the first in U.S. Open history, was pushed back to Monday because Sunday was reserved for member play. Smith jumped out to a three-stroke lead at the turn and led by five shots with fives holes to play. He went 5-7-5-4 over the next four holes, while Anderson recorded all fours to even up the match. At the 18th, Anderson found the green in two while Smith's approach landed in the rough. Anderson two-putted for his four, while Smith chipped to four feet (1.2 m) with a chance to tie, but his putt went astray and failed to find the cup. Anderson finished with an 85, a stroke better than Smith.

Smith's brother Willie, the 1899 champion, finished in third place, two shots out of the playoff. Myopia club pro John Jones was twelfth, then caddied for Anderson during the playoff. For the only time in U.S. Open history, no player managed to break 80 in any round.

Anderson would go on to win a record four U.S. Open titles in five years, including three consecutive (1903–1905), yet to be repeated. His four titles have been matched by three others: Bobby Jones, Ben Hogan, and Jack Nicklaus.

== Round summaries ==
=== First round ===
Friday, June 14, 1901 (morning)

Place	Player	Score
1	(Scotland) Laurie Auchterlonie	81
T2	(Scotland) Arthur Lockwood (a)	82
T2	(Scotland) George Low	82
T2	(Scotland) Alex Smith	82
T5	(Scotland) Willie Anderson	84
T5	(Scotland) Alex Campbell	84
T5	(England) Bernard Nicholls	84
T8	(Scotland) David Brown	86
T8	(Scotland) Val Fitzjohn	86
T8	(Scotland) Stewart Gardner	86

=== Second round ===
Friday, June 14, 1901 (afternoon)

Place	Player	Score
1	(Scotland) Alex Smith	82-82=164
2	(Scotland) Laurie Auchterlonie	81-85=166
3	(Scotland) Willie Anderson	84-83=167
4	(Scotland) Stewart Gardner	86-82=168
T5	(Scotland) David Brown	86-83=169
T5	(England) Bernard Nicholls	84-85=169
7	(Scotland) Willie Smith	84-86=170
T8	(England) John Jones	87-84=171
T8	(Scotland) George Low	82-89=171
T8	(Scotland) Jack Park	87-84=171

=== Third round ===
Saturday, June 15, 1901 (morning)

Place	Player	Score
1	(Scotland) Stewart Gardner	86-82-81=249
2	(Scotland) Willie Anderson	84-83-83=250
3	(Scotland) Alex Smith	82-82-87=251
T4	(Scotland) Laurie Auchterlonie	81-85-86=252
T4	(Scotland) David Brown	86-83-83=252
T4	(England) Bernard Nicholls	84-85-83=252
T4	(Scotland) Willie Smith	84-86-82=252
T8	(Scotland) George Low	82-89-85=256
T8	(Scotland) Jack Park	87-84-85=256
10	(Scotland) Alex Campbell	84-91-82=257

=== Final round ===
Saturday, June 15, 1901 (afternoon)

Place	Player	Score	Money ($)
T1	(Scotland) Willie Anderson	84-83-83-81=331	Playoff
T1	(Scotland) Alex Smith	82-82-87-80=331	Playoff
3	(Scotland) Willie Smith	84-86-82-81=333	125
4	(Scotland) Stewart Gardner	86-82-81-85=334	100
T5	(Scotland) Laurie Auchterlonie	81-85-86-83=335	75
T5	(England) Bernard Nicholls	84-85-83-83=335	75
7	(Scotland) David Brown	86-83-83-84=336	50
8	(Scotland) Alex Campbell	84-91-82-82=339	25
T9	(Scotland) George Low	82-89-85-85=341	0
T9	(Scotland) Jack Park	87-84-85-85=341	0

=== Playoff ===
Monday, June 17, 1901

Place	Player	Score	Money ($)
1	(Scotland) Willie Anderson	43-42=85	200
2	(Scotland) Alex Smith	40-46=86	150
