= 1898 U.S. Open (golf) =

Coordinates: 42.609°N 70.859°W

Tournament information
- Dates: June 17–18, 1898
- Location: South Hamilton, Massachusetts
- Course: Myopia Hunt Club
- Organized by: USGA
- Format: Stroke play − 72 holes

Statistics
- Field: 45
- Cut: none
- Prize fund: $335
- Winner's share: $150

Champion
- (Scotland) Fred Herd
- 328

Location in the United States
Location in Massachusetts

The 1898 U.S. Open was the fourth U.S. Open, held June 17–18 at Myopia Hunt Club in South Hamilton, Massachusetts, northeast of Boston. Fred Herd captured his only major title, seven strokes ahead of runner-up Alex Smith.

For the first time, the U.S. Open was expanded to 72 holes, meaning the players had to complete eight loops around Myopia's 9-hole course. Herd trailed leader Willie Anderson by six shots after 36 holes on Friday, but his 75 in the third round on Saturday morning was the low round of the championship and gave him a six-shot advantage after 54 holes. Despite an 84 in the afternoon for 328, Herd prevailed over Alex Smith by seven, with Anderson finishing in third. Only Herd and Smith managed to break 80 in any round of the championship.

Herd's fondness for liquor was well-known; after his win, tournament officials required him to leave a deposit to prevent him from selling the trophy for drinking money. His brother Sandy won The Open Championship in 1902.

== Round summaries ==
=== First round ===
Friday, June 17, 1898 (morning)

Place	Player	Score
1	(Scotland) Alex Smith	78
T2	(Scotland) Willie Anderson	81
T2	(United States) Herbert Leeds (a)	81
4	(Scotland) Willie Smith	82
5	(England) John Jones	83
T6	(England) John Harland	84
T6	(Scotland) Fred Herd	84
T6	(England) Willie Hoare	84
T9	(Scotland) Willie Dunn, Jr.	85
T9	(Scotland) Robert McAndrews	85
T9	J.H. Mercer	85
T9	(Scotland) Harry Turpie	85

=== Second round ===
Friday, June 17, 1898 (afternoon)

Place	Player	Score
1	(Scotland) Willie Anderson	81-82=163
2	(Scotland) Alex Smith	78-86=164
3	(United States) Herbert Leeds (a)	81-84=165
T4	(England) John Jones	83-84=167
T4	(England) Joe Lloyd	87-80=167
6	(England) Willie Hoare	84-84=168
7	(Scotland) Fred Herd	84-85=169
T8	(Scotland) Willie Dunn, Jr.	85-87=172
T8	(Scotland) Harry Turpie	85-87=172
T10	(Scotland) Bernard Nicholls	86-87=173
T10	(Scotland) Willie Smith	82-91=173

=== Third round ===
Saturday, June 18, 1898 (morning)

Place	Player	Score
1	(Scotland) Fred Herd	84-85-75=244
T2	(Scotland) Willie Anderson	81-82-87=250
T2	(Scotland) Alex Smith	78-86-86=250
4	(England) Joe Lloyd	87-80-86=253
5	(England) Willie Hoare	84-84-87=255
6	(England) John Jones	83-84-90=257
T7	(United States) Herbert Leeds (a)	81-84-93=258
T7	(Scotland) Willie Smith	82-91-85=258
T7	(Scotland) Harry Turpie	85-87-86=258
10	(Scotland) Willie Dunn, Jr.	85-87-87=259

=== Final round ===
Saturday, June 18, 1898 (afternoon)

Place	Player	Score	Money ($)
1	(Scotland) Fred Herd	84-85-75-84=328	150
2	(Scotland) Alex Smith	78-86-86-85=335	100
3	(Scotland) Willie Anderson	81-82-87-86=336	50
4	(England) Joe Lloyd	87-80-86-86=339	25
5	(Scotland) Willie Smith	82-91-85-82=340	10
6	(England) Willie Hoare	84-84-87-87=342	0
7	(Scotland) Willie Dunn, Jr.	85-87-87-85=344	0
T8	(England) John Jones	83-84-90-90=347	0
T8	(United States) Herbert Leeds (a)	81-84-93-89=347	0
T8	(Scotland) Robert McAndrews	85-90-86-86=347	0
T8	(England) Bernard Nicholls	86-87-88-86=347	0

Amateurs: Leeds (347), Curtis (356), Tyng (361), Shaw (364), Sweny (384), Rutherford (388).
