= Myopia Club =

The Myopia Club, regarded by some historians as being the oldest country club, was founded in the 1870s by four brothers with poor vision: Gordon, Charles, Morton, and Frederick Prince. At first it was a neighborhood boys club devoted to boating and tennis, based on the shores of Wedge Pond in Winchester, Massachusetts. Later the members' interests turned to riding and foxhunting, and the club moved to another site in Winchester, on Mystic Lake, where it became formally incorporated in 1879.

Several Myopia Club members were interested in moving the club closer to Boston, and this led to the founding of The Country Club in Brookline, Massachusetts in 1882. But fox hunting proved impossible in Brookline, so those most interested in this activity founded the Myopia Hunt Club in Hamilton, Massachusetts.

The Mystic Lake site became known as "Myopia Hill". The Winchester Country Club was founded there in 1902, and it still occupies the site.
