= Fred McLeod (golfer) =

Scottish-American golfer (1882–1976)

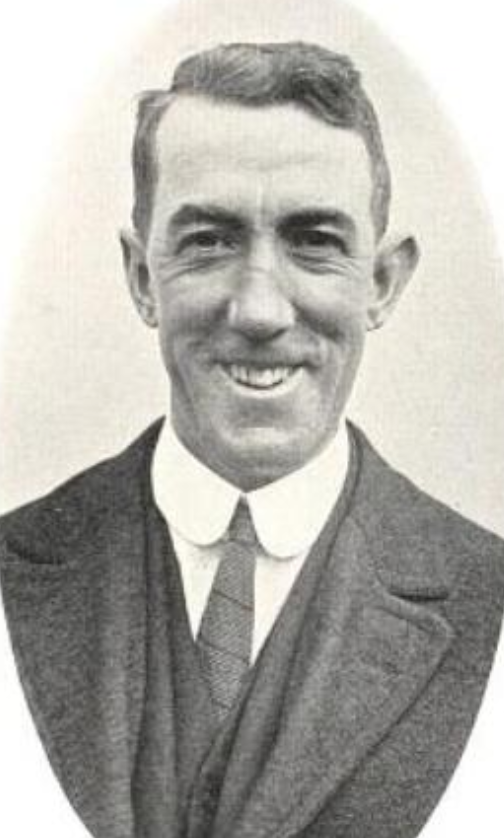
- McLeod, from a 1921 publication

Personal information
- Full name: Frederick Robertson McLeod
- Nickname: The Wasp
- Nationality: Scotland; United States
- Born: 25 April 1882 North Berwick, Scotland
- Died: 8 May 1976 (aged 94) Washington, D.C., U.S.
- Height: 5 ft 4 in (1.63 m)
- Weight: 108 lb (49 kg; 7.7 st)

Career
- Sport: Golf
- Status: Professional
- Professional wins: 10

Number of wins by tour
- PGA Tour: 4
- Other: 6

Best results in major championships (wins: 1)
- Masters Tournament: T50: 1934
- PGA Championship: 2nd: 1919
- U.S. Open: Won: 1908
- The Open Championship: 7th: 1926

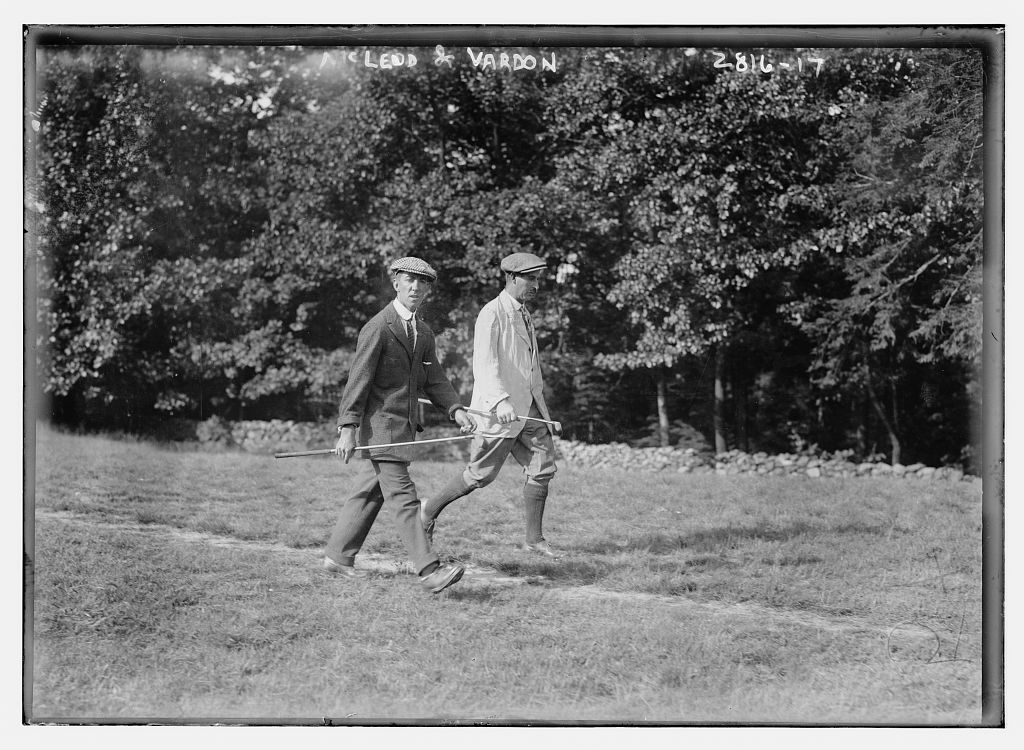
Fred McLeod and Harry Vardon at the 1913 U.S. Open

Frederick Robertson McLeod (25 April 1882 – 8 May 1976) was a Scottish-born golfer who played primarily in the United States. He had a distinguished career in the United States, which included a victory in the 1908 U.S. Open.

== Early life ==
He was born in Kirk Ports, North Berwick, East Lothian, Scotland. McLeod's mother was from Bolton in East Lothian and his father Neil was from the Isle of Skye. His father was employed as the manager of a temperance book stall and also worked as a caddie.

McLeod began his working life as a postman at the age of fourteen. At seventeen he joined the Bass Rock Golf Club in North Berwick, which was a club for artisans. It did not have its own course and the members played on a public links. McLeod soon had some success in local competitions.

== Professional career ==
In 1903, he left for the United States to try his luck as a golf professional there, a route followed by many other Scots around that time as the golf clubs which were springing up rapidly in the U.S. had no experienced local professionals on whom they could call. He quickly found employment at the Rockford Country Club in Illinois, and later worked at several other clubs.

Despite not having been a leading player in Scotland, McLeod soon made a name for himself as a first rate tournament player in the U.S. He acquired the nickname "the wasp" from fellow American professionals. He entered his first U.S. Open within weeks of his arrival in America, and later that year he was fifth at the Western Open. He won the Riverside Open in 1905 and the Western PGA Championship in both 1905 and 1907. The principal achievement of his career was his victory in the 1908 U.S. Open at Myopia Hunt Club in South Hamilton, Massachusetts. He was level with Willie Smith after four rounds, but won the playoff by 77 shots to 83. McLeod was five feet four inches tall, and at the end of the tournament he was weighed at 7 stone 10 pounds (108 pounds, 49 kilograms), making him the smallest man ever to take the title. He competed in the U.S. Open twenty-two times and had eight top ten finishes.

McLeod won several more professional tournaments: the 1909 and 1920 North and South Open at Pinehurst, the 1912 Shawnee Open, the 1924 St. Petersburg Open, and the 1927 Maryland Open. In 1919, he was runner up to Jim Barnes in the PGA Championship. He took part in both the 1921 challenge match between teams of U.S based and British based professionals at Gleneagles, Perth and Kinross, Scotland, and in the follow-up 1926 match which was the immediate precursor of the first Ryder Cup match in 1927.

During this period McLeod wintered at Temple Terrace, Florida (1925–26) where he worked with James Thomson from North Berwick. It was in Florida that McLeod was involved in the first 'Professional Golf League' in 1925. As the number of golf courses increased, many of top professionals were signed up in the winter months to represent the Florida clubs in a team competition. Walter Hagen and Joe Kirkwood, Sr. were signed up to Pasadena Country Club, Jim Barnes and Fred McLeod played for Temple Terrace Golf and Country Club and Gene Sarazen and Leo Diegel represented Hollywood Country Club. Although exhibition matches were still popular, this team format increased the players' earnings as they received 60% of the $2 entrance fee paid by spectators at the gate. At Augusta National Golf Club, he played in the first four editions of the Masters Tournament from 1934 to 1937, won the 1938 PGA Seniors' Championship held there, and acted as an honorary starter at the Masters from 1963 to 1976. He was a member of the group of senior professionals which established the senior division of the PGA of America in 1937.

== Personal life ==
McLeod died in Washington, D.C., at the age of 94. He was buried at the last club where he had worked as a professional, Columbia Country Club, in Chevy Chase, Maryland.

== Professional wins (10) ==
=== PGA Tour wins (4) ===
- 1908 **U.S. Open**
- 1920 North and South Open
- 1921 St. Augustine Open
- 1924 St. Petersburg Open

Majors shown in bold.

=== Other wins (6) ===
- 1905 Riverside Open
- 1905 Western PGA Championship
- 1907 Western PGA Championship
- 1909 North and South Open
- 1912 Shawnee Open
- 1927 Maryland Open

== Major championships ==
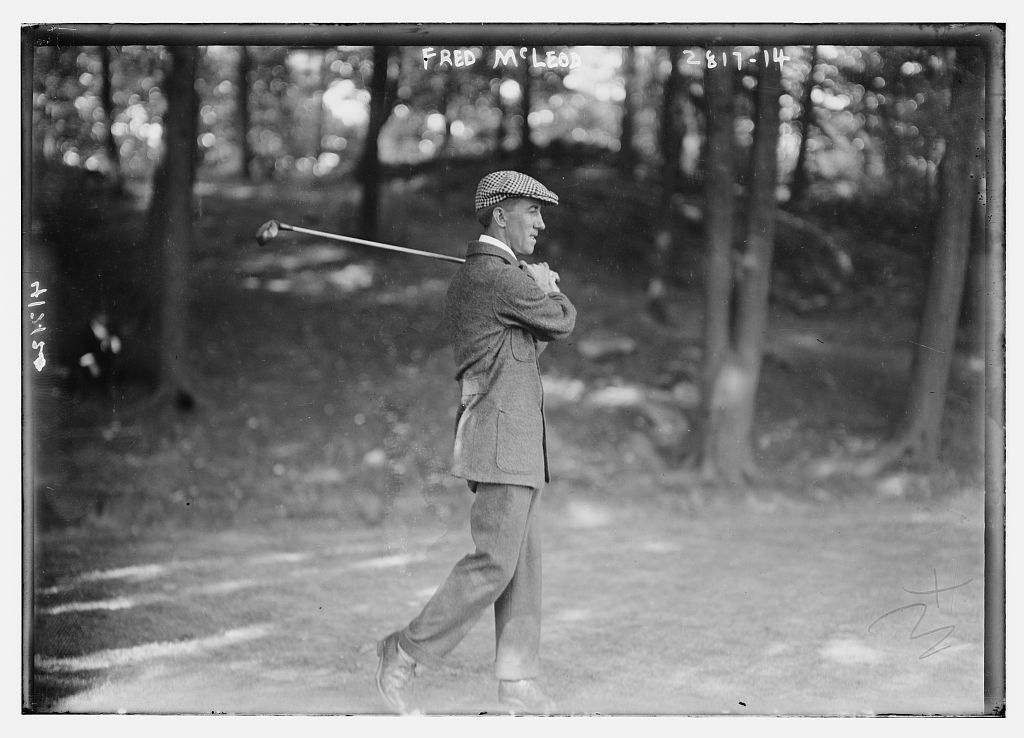
1913 U.S. Open

=== Wins (1) ===
Year	Championship	54 Holes	Winning score	Margin	Runner-up
1908	U.S. Open	1 shot deficit	82-82-81-77=322	Playoff ^{1}	(United States) Willie Smith

^{1} Defeated Willie Smith in an 18-hole playoff – McLeod (77), Smith (83)

=== Results timeline ===
Tournament	1903	1904	1905	1906	1907	1908	1909
U.S. Open	T26	T29	19	T35	T5	**1**	T13
The Open Championship							

Tournament	1910	1911	1912	1913	1914	1915	1916	1917	1918	1919
U.S. Open	4	4	T13	T39	T3	T8	T24	NT	NT	8
The Open Championship						NT	NT	NT	NT	NT
PGA Championship	NYF	NYF	NYF	NYF	NYF	NYF		NT	NT	2

Tournament	1920	1921	1922	1923	1924	1925	1926	1927	1928	1929
U.S. Open	13	T2			T40		CUT		T41	CUT
The Open Championship		T63					7			
PGA Championship		QF		QF	R32		R32			

Tournament	1930	1931	1932	1933	1934	1935	1936	1937	1938	1939
Masters Tournament	NYF	NYF	NYF	NYF	T50	64	WD			
U.S. Open		CUT								
The Open Championship										
PGA Championship										

Tournament	1940	1941	1942	1943	1944	1945	1946	1947	1948	1949
Masters Tournament				NT	NT	NT				
U.S. Open		WD	NT	NT	NT	NT	WD			
The Open Championship	NT	NT	NT	NT	NT	NT				
PGA Championship				NT						

Tournament	1950	1951	1952	1953	1954	1955	1956	1957	1958	1959
Masters Tournament		WD	WD	WD	WD	WD	WD	WD	WD	WD
U.S. Open										
The Open Championship										
PGA Championship										

Tournament	1960	1961	1962
Masters Tournament	WD	WD	WD
U.S. Open			
The Open Championship			
PGA Championship			

Win
Top 10
Did not play

NYF = Tournament not yet founded
NT = No tournament
WD = Withdrew
CUT = missed the half-way cut
R64, R32, R16, QF, SF = Round in which player lost in PGA Championship match play
"T" indicates a tie for a place
