= Fred Herd =

Scottish golfer

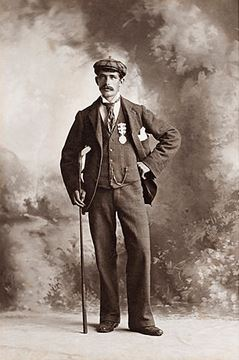
- Herd in 1898

Personal information
- Full name: Frederick Herd
- Nationality: Scotland; United States
- Born: 26 November 1873 St Andrews, Scotland
- Died: 14 March 1954 (aged 80)

Career
- Sport: Golf
- Status: Professional
- Professional wins: 1

Best results in major championships (wins: 1)
- Masters Tournament: DNP
- PGA Championship: DNP
- U.S. Open: Won: 1898
- The Open Championship: DNP

Fred Herd (26 November 1873 – 14 March 1954) was a Scottish professional golfer from St Andrews.

== Early life ==
Herd was born at St Andrews, Scotland on 26 November 1873. His brother, Sandy Herd, won The Open Championship in 1902. He emigrated to the United States in 1897, became a naturalized citizen

== Professional career ==
In 1897, he posted as the professional at the Washington Park course in Chicago. He and his brother James were boarding at the Chicago home of Ellen McNulty and her family in 1900.

In 1898, he won the fourth U.S. Open at Myopia Hunt Club, in South Hamilton, Massachusetts. This was the first U.S. Open to be played over 72 holes, requiring the competitors to play eight rounds of Myopia's nine-hole course. Herd turned in a card totaling 328, 84-85-75-84, averaging 82 strokes per 18-hole round. Two other brothers, Alex and Davy, played in the 1898 U.S. Open, which Fred won, but they did not finish in the top 10. He won a $150 prize for winning the event — a large sum of money at the time — but such was his reputation as a drinker that he was not allowed to take the U.S. Open trophy away until he had paid a deposit, as the USGA was worried that he might pawn it to buy alcohol.

Herd played in the U.S. Open on three other occasions, but did not have any other top-ten finishes.

== Death and legacy ==
Herd died on 14 March 1954. He is best remembered for winning the 1898 U.S. Open.

== Major championships ==
=== Wins (1) ===
Year	Championship	54 holes	Winning score	Margin	Runner-up
1898	U.S. Open	6 shot lead	84-85-75-84=328	7 strokes	(Scotland) Alex Smith

=== Results timeline ===
Herd played only in the U.S. Open.

Tournament	1898	1899	1900	1901	1902
U.S. Open	1	T25	T16		24

Win
Did not play

"T" indicates a tie for a place
