= Northwood Club =

Country club in Dallas, Texas, United States

Coordinates: 32.932°N 96.7925°W

Northwood Club is a private country club in Dallas, Texas.

It hosted the U.S. Open in 1952, won by Julius Boros, which ended Ben Hogan's streak of titles at three in three attempts; the Fort Worth native led after two rounds but finished in third place. Northwood has since been the host of several Regional USGA, local North Texas PGA, and AJGA tournaments. The course was originally designed by W. H. Diddel, with many large trees lining the fairways and traditional small greens. The course was redesigned in 1990 by Jay Morrish and Tom Weiskopf. The golf course plays 6,835 yards (6,250 m) to a par of 70 from the championship tees. The Northwood Club golf course consistently ranks in the Top 20 Golf Courses in Texas by The Dallas Morning News.

The Northwood golf course has 007 bentgrass putting greens, along with Northbridge bermuda grass tees and fairways. The roughs are a mix of bermuda, zoysia and fescue grasses. Many mature trees are on the property, including live oak, red oak, pecan, American elm, cedar elm, hackberry and cottonwood.

In addition to the 18 hole golf course, current athletic facilities include 16 tennis courts with four indoor courts. A notable Northwood tennis program alumni is tennis professional Bill Scanlon, who began playing tennis at Northwood at nine years of age. During Scanlon's tennis career, he won two NCAA singles championships at Trinity University in 1975 and 1976, won numerous titles on the professional tour, and in 1983 was ranked as high as No. 9 in the world.

Northwood Club has a large resort-style swimming pool complex, changing facilities, lockers and a poolside cafe and adult pavilion bar. The main clubhouse is approximately 65,000 square feet (6,000 m^{2}) with banquet facilities seating 550 and can accommodate cocktail parties of up to 700, ala carte dining at lunch and dinner and several private-function rooms. Adjacent to the main clubhouse is a 16,000-square-foot (1,500 m^{2}) two-story building offering a full fitness center, including group exercise and massage and child care services.
