= 1905 U.S. Open (golf) =

Coordinates: 42.609°N 70.859°W

Tournament information
- Dates: September 21–22, 1905
- Location: South Hamilton, Massachusetts
- Course: Myopia Hunt Club
- Organized by: USGA
- Format: Stroke play − 72 holes

Statistics
- Field: 78, 57 after cut
- Cut: 175
- Winner's share: $200

Champion
- (Scotland) Willie Anderson
- 314

Location in the United States
Location in Massachusetts

The 1905 U.S. Open was the 11th U.S. Open, held September 21–22 at Myopia Hunt Club in South Hamilton, Massachusetts, northeast of Boston. Willie Anderson won his third consecutive U.S. Open title, and his record fourth overall, two strokes ahead of runner-up Alex Smith.

Smith was the co-leader with Stewart Gardner at 156 after the first 36 holes on Thursday. Following the third round on Friday morning, Smith led Anderson by a shot, but a third consecutive 80 in the afternoon dropped him to second place. Five strokes back after the second round, Anderson closed with 76 and 77 for 314, two strokes ahead of Smith. Scoring conditions at Myopia were very difficult; the lowest score posted was 75, by 1897 champion Joe Lloyd in the opening round. His next best was 83 in the third round.

Anderson's feat of three consecutive U.S. Open titles remains unmatched, while his four wins were later equaled by three others: Bobby Jones, Ben Hogan, and Jack Nicklaus. Anderson played in the next five editions with three top-five finishes and was eleventh in his last appearance in 1910; he died four months later at age 31.

== Round summaries ==
=== First round ===
Thursday, September 22, 1905 (morning)

Place	Player	Score
1	(England) Joe Lloyd	75
2	(Scotland) Alex Smith	76
3	(Scotland) Stewart Gardner	78
T4	(Scotland) Peter Robertson	79
T4	(Scotland) Alec Ross	79
T6	(Scotland) Fred McLeod	80
T6	(Scotland) James Maiden	80
T6	(England) Bernard Nicholls	80
T6	(Scotland) Harry Turpie	80
T10	(Scotland) Willie Anderson	81
T10	(England) Percy Barrett	81
T10	(Scotland) Fred Mackenzie	81
T10	John Mackie	81
T10	(United States) Tom McNamara	81
T10	(United States) Bob Peebles	81
T10	Arthur Smith	81
T10	(United States) Walter Travis (a)	81
T10	(Scotland) George Turnbull	81
T10	(England) Bert Way	81

=== Second round ===
Thursday, September 22, 1905 (afternoon)

Place	Player	Score
T1	(Scotland) Stewart Gardner	78-78=156
T1	(Scotland) Alex Smith	76-80=156
T3	(Scotland) Alex Campbell	82-76=158
T3	(England) Gilbert Nicholls	82-76=158
T3	Arthur Smith	81-77=158
6	(Scotland) Peter Robertson	79-80=159
7	(United States) Tom McNamara	81-79=160
T8	(Scotland) Willie Anderson	81-80=161
T8	(England) Percy Barrett	81-80=161
T8	(England) Joe Lloyd	75-86=161
T8	(United States) Walter Travis (a)	81-80=161

=== Third round ===
Friday, September 22, 1905 (morning)

Place	Player	Score
1	(Scotland) Alex Smith	76-80-80=236
2	(Scotland) Willie Anderson	81-80-76=237
T3	(England) Percy Barrett	81-80-77=238
T3	(Scotland) Alex Campbell	82-76-80=238
T3	Arthur Smith	81-77-80=238
6	(Scotland) Peter Robertson	79-80-81=240
T7	(Scotland) Stewart Gardner	78-78-85=241
T7	(United States) Walter Travis (a)	81-80-80=241
T9	(Scotland) George Cumming	85-82-75=242
T9	(England) Gilbert Nicholls	82-76-84=242

=== Final round ===
Friday, September 22, 1905 (afternoon)

Place	Player	Score	Money ($)
1	(Scotland) Willie Anderson	81-80-76-77=314	200
2	(Scotland) Alex Smith	76-80-80-80=316	150
T3	(England) Percy Barrett	81-80-77-79=317	113
T3	(Scotland) Peter Robertson	79-80-81-77=317	113
5	(Scotland) Stewart Gardner	78-78-85-77=318	80
6	(Scotland) Alex Campbell	82-76-80-81=319	70
T7	(Scotland) Jack Hobens	82-80-81-78=321	45
T7	(England) Gilbert Nicholls	82-76-84-79=321	45
9	(Scotland) George Cumming	85-82-75-81=323	30
10	(Scotland) Arthur Smith	81-77-80-86=324	25

Amateurs: Lockwood (325), Travis (325).
