= U.S. Open (golf) =

Golf tournament held in the United States

Tournament information
- Established: 1895, 131 years ago
- Organized by: United States Golf Association
- Tours: PGA Tour; European Tour; Japan Golf Tour
- Format: Stroke play
- Prize fund: $22,500,000
- Month played: June
- Website: usopen.com

Tournament record score
- Aggregate: 268 Rory McIlroy (2011)
- To par: −16 Rory McIlroy (2011) −16 Brooks Koepka (2017)

Current champion
- (United States) Wyndham Clark

Current tournament
- 2026 U.S. Open (golf)

The United States Open Championship, commonly known as the U.S. Open, is the annual open championship of golf in the United States. It is the third of the four major championships, and is on the official schedule of the PGA Tour and European Tour. Since 1898, the competition has been 72 holes of stroke play (four rounds on an 18-hole course). It is staged by the United States Golf Association (USGA) in mid-June, scheduled to conclude on the third Sunday, Father's Day. Staged at a variety of courses, the U.S. Open is set up so that scoring is very difficult, with a premium placed on accurate driving. As of 2026, the U.S. Open awards a $22.5 million purse, the largest of the four major championships.

== History ==
The first U.S. Open was played on October 4, 1895, on a nine-hole course at the Newport Country Club in Newport, Rhode Island. It was a 36-hole competition and was played in a single day. Ten professionals and one amateur entered. The winner was Horace Rawlins, a 21-year-old Englishman, who had arrived in the U.S. earlier that year to take up a position at the host club. He received $150 cash out of a prize fund of $335, plus a $50 gold medal; his club received the Open Championship Cup trophy, which was presented by the USGA.

In the beginning, the tournament was dominated by experienced British players until 1911, when John J. McDermott became the first native-born American winner. American golfers soon began to win regularly and the tournament evolved to become one of the four majors.

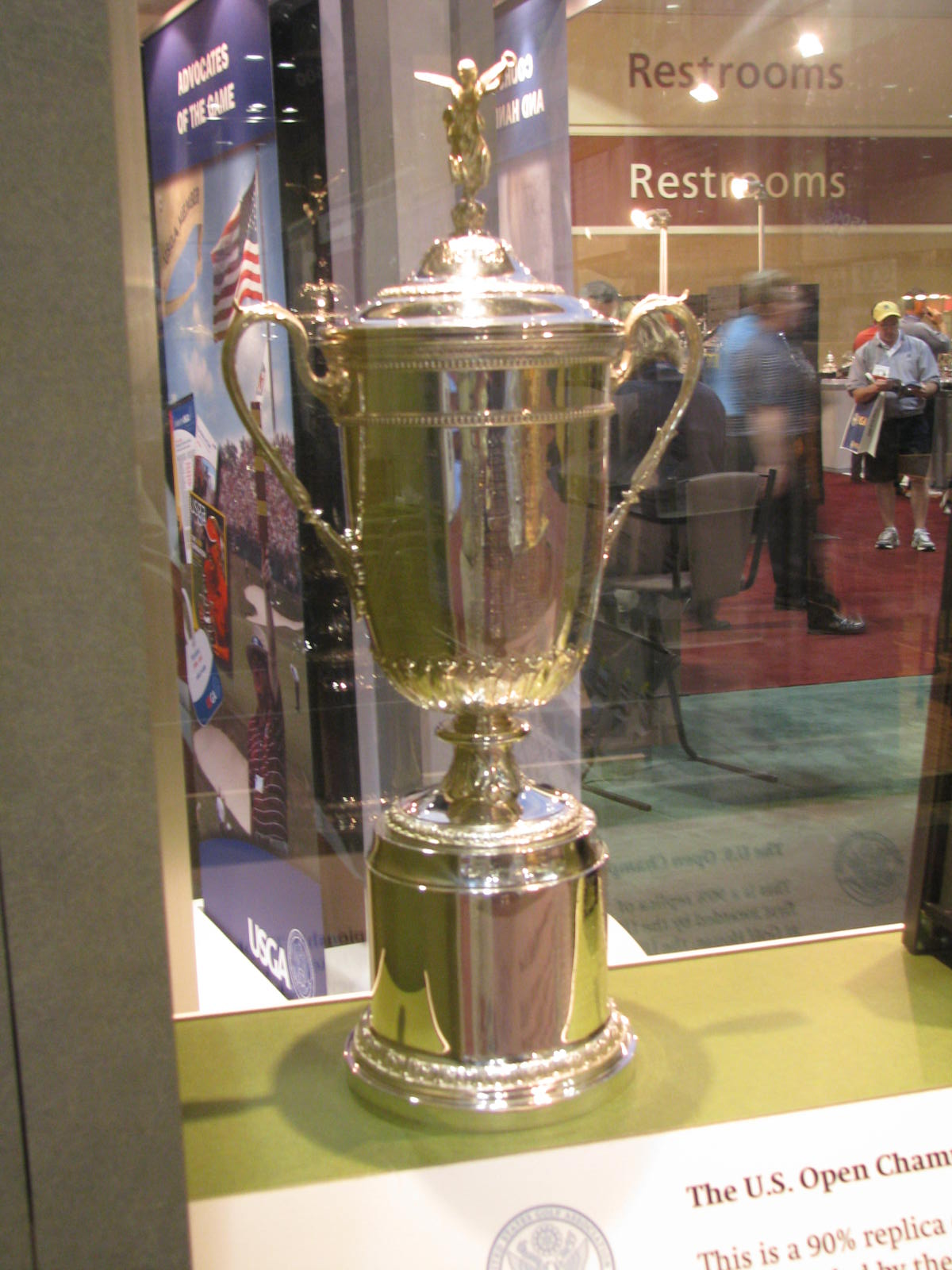
U.S. Open Trophy at the 2008 PGA Golf Show.

Since 1911, the title has been won mostly by players from the United States. Since 1950, players from only six countries other than the United States have won the championship, most notably South Africa, which has won five times since 1965. A streak of four consecutive non-American winners occurred from 2004 to 2007 for the first time since 1910. These four players, South African Retief Goosen (2004), New Zealander Michael Campbell (2005), Australian Geoff Ogilvy (2006) and Argentine Ángel Cabrera (2007), are all from countries in the Southern Hemisphere. Northern Ireland's Graeme McDowell (2010) became the first European player to win the event since Tony Jacklin of England in 1970; three more Europeans won in the next four editions, making it only three American wins in the 11 tournaments from 2004 to 2014.

U.S. Open play is characterized by tight scoring at or around par by the leaders, with the winner usually emerging at around even par. A U.S. Open course is seldom beaten severely, and there have been many over-par wins (in part because par is usually set at 70, except for the very longest courses). Normally, an Open course is quite long and will have a high cut of primary rough (termed "Open rough" by the American press and fans); undulating greens (such as at Pinehurst No. 2 in 2005, which was described by Johnny Miller of NBC as "like trying to hit a ball on top of a VW Beetle"); pinched fairways (especially on what are expected to be less difficult holes); and two or three holes that are short par fives under regular play would be used as long par fours during the tournament (often to meet that frequently used par of 70, forcing players to have accurate long drives). Some courses that are attempting to get into the rotation for the U.S. Open will undergo renovations to develop these features. Rees Jones is the most notable of the "Open Doctors" who take on these projects; his father Robert Trent Jones had filled that role earlier. As with any professional golf tournament, the available space surrounding the course (for spectators, among other considerations) and local infrastructure also factor into deciding which courses will host the event.

== Qualification ==
The U.S. Open is open to any professional, or to any amateur with a USGA Handicap Index not exceeding 0.4. Players (male or female) may obtain a place by being fully exempt or by competing successfully in qualifying. The field is 156 players.

About half of the field is made up of players who are fully exempt from qualifying. The current exemption categories are:

- Winners of the U.S. Open for the last ten years
- Winner and runner-up from the previous year's U.S. Amateur and winners of the previous year's U.S. Junior Amateur, Amateur Championship, Latin America Amateur Championship, and U.S. Mid-Amateur
  - The runner-up from the U.S. Amateur and the winners of all tournaments except the U.S. Amateur must remain an amateur.
  - The winner of the U.S. Amateur, however, may turn professional after winning the U.S. Amateur and retain his eligibility.
- The previous year's Mark H. McCormack Medal winner for the top-ranked amateur golfer in the world
- The individual winner of the most recent NCAA Division I men's golf championship
- Winners of each of Masters Tournament, Open Championship and PGA Championship for the last five years
- Winners of the last three Players Championships
- Winner of the current year's BMW PGA Championship
- Winner of the last U.S. Senior Open
- Players who win multiple U.S. PGA Tour events during the time between tournaments, provided the tournaments each offer 500 or more points to the winner, and are not opposite-field events.
- In the year after the Olympic golf tournament, the reigning men's gold medalist
- Top 10 finishers and ties from the previous year's U.S. Open
- Players who qualified for the previous year's Tour Championship
- The top 60 in the Official World Golf Ranking (OWGR) as of two weeks before the start of the tournament
- The top 60 in the OWGR as of the tournament date
- The top player in the Korn Ferry Tour points, based on combined points from the Regular Season and Finals, from the previous season (starting in 2023).
- The top two DP World Tour players from the previous season's final Race to Dubai rankings who did not qualify through any previous exemption, as well as the top non-exempt player in the current season's Race to Dubai
- Should a LIV Golf League player not previously exempt finish in the top 3 of the individual league rankings in the previous or current season, they will qualify
- Special exemptions selected by the USGA
- All remaining spots after the second top 60 OWGR cutoff date filled by alternates from qualifying tournaments.

The exemptions for amateurs apply only if the players remain amateurs as of the tournament date, excluding the U.S. Amateur champion; they can retain their earned exemption regardless of amateur status for the U.S. Open following a 2019 rule change. As the U.S. Open typically takes place after the college golf season has ended, it is not uncommon for top amateur players to turn professional immediately after their last collegiate event (typically the end of the NCAA championships) in order to maximize the number of FedEx Cup points they may score before the August cutoff to avoid qualifying school.

Before 2011, the sole OWGR cutoff for entry was the top 50 as of two weeks before the tournament. An exemption category for the top 50 as of the tournament date was added for 2011, apparently in response to the phenomenon of golfers entering the top 50 between the original cutoff date and the tournament (such as Justin Rose and Rickie Fowler in 2010).

Through 2011, exemptions existed for leading money winners on the PGA, European, Japanese, and Australasian tours, as well as winners of multiple PGA Tour events in the year before the U.S. Open. These categories were eliminated in favor of inviting the top 60 on the OWGR at both relevant dates. Starting with the 2012 championship, an exemption was added for the winner of the current year's BMW PGA Championship, the European Tour's equivalent of The Players Championship.

Potential competitors who are not fully exempt must enter the Qualifying process, which has two stages. Firstly there is Local Qualifying, which is played over 18 holes at more than 100 courses around the United States. Many leading players are exempt from this first stage, and they join the successful local qualifiers at the Sectional Qualifying stage, which is played over 36 holes in one day at several sites in the U.S., as well as one each in Europe, Canada, and Japan. Most sectional qualifiers are held on the Monday of the week prior to the U.S. Open. Field sizes and qualifying spots on offer vary from site to site; in recent years, the USGA has placed events near scheduled PGA Tour and Korn Ferry Tour stops to better accommodate touring pros who did not qualify through an exemption. There is no lower age limit and the youngest-ever qualifier was 14-year-old Andy Zhang of China, who qualified in 2012 after Paul Casey withdrew days before the tournament.

=== USGA special exemptions ===
The USGA has granted a special exemption to 35 players 53 times since 1966. Players with multiple special exemptions include: Arnold Palmer (1978, 1980, 1981, 1983, 1994), Seve Ballesteros (1978, 1994), Gary Player (1981, 1983), Lee Trevino (1983, 1984), Hale Irwin (1990, 2002, 2003), Jack Nicklaus (1991, 1993, 1995, 1996, 1997, 1998, 1999, 2000), and Tom Watson (1993, 1996, 2000, 2003, 2010).

Irwin won the 1990 U.S. Open after accepting a special exemption. In 2016, a special exemption was extended to former champion Retief Goosen (2001, 2004). In 2018, a special exemption was extended to former U.S. Open champions Jim Furyk (2003) and Ernie Els (1994, 1997). The last special exemption was granted to three-time champion Tiger Woods to play in 2024.

== Prizes ==
The purse at the 2026 U.S. Open was $22.5 million, and the winner's share was $4.5 million. The European Tour uses conversion rates at the time of the tournament to calculate the official prize money used in their Race to Dubai.

In line with the other majors, winning the U.S. Open gives a golfer several privileges that make his career much more secure if he is not already one of the elite players of the sport. U.S. Open champions are automatically invited to play in the other three majors (the Masters, The Open Championship (British Open), and the PGA Championship) for the next five years. They are also automatically invited to play in The Players Championship for the next five years, and they are exempt from qualifying for the U.S. Open itself for 10 years.

Winners may also receive a five-year exemption on the PGA Tour, which is automatic for regular members. Non-PGA Tour members who win the U.S. Open have the choice of joining the PGA Tour either within 60 days of winning, or prior to the beginning of any one of the next five tour seasons.

Finally, U.S. Open winners receive automatic invitations to three of the five senior majors once they turn 50; they receive a five-year invitation to the U.S. Senior Open and a lifetime invitation to the Senior PGA Championship and Senior British Open.

The top 10 finishers at the U.S. Open are fully exempt from qualifying for the following year's Open, and the top four are automatically invited to the following season's Masters.

Players who make the cut but have no status on the PGA Tour and are not exempt by any other means earn entry into the second stage of PGA Tour Qualifying Tournament.

== Playoff format ==
Through 2017, the U.S. Open retained a full 18-hole playoff the following day (Monday). If a tie existed after that fifth round, then the playoff continued as sudden-death on the 91st hole. The U.S. Open advanced to sudden-death three times (1990, 1994, 2008), most recently when Tiger Woods defeated Rocco Mediate on the first additional playoff hole in 2008. Before sudden-death was introduced (1970s?), additional 18-hole rounds were played (1925, 1939, 1946) to break the tie. When the playoff was scheduled for 36 holes and ended in a tie, as in 1931, a second 36-hole playoff was required.

After consulting fans, players, and media partners, the USGA adopted a two-hole aggregate playoff format in 2018; if the playoff ends tied, sudden death will commence. Through 2026, the two-hole format has yet to be used, as the most recent playoff was 18 years ago in 2008.

== Winners ==
Year	Winner	Score	To par	Margin of victory	Runner(s)-up	Winner's share ($)	Venue	Location
2026	(United States) Wyndham Clark (2)	276	−4	1 stroke	(United States) Sam Burns	4,500,000	Shinnecock Hills	Shinnecock Hills, New York
2025	(United States) J. J. Spaun	279	–1	2 strokes	(Scotland) Robert MacIntyre	4,300,000	Oakmont	Plum, Pennsylvania
2024	(United States) Bryson DeChambeau (2)	274	−6	1 stroke	(Northern Ireland) Rory McIlroy	4,300,000	Pinehurst Resort (Course No. 2)	Pinehurst, North Carolina
2023	(United States) Wyndham Clark	270	−10	1 stroke	(Northern Ireland) Rory McIlroy	3,600,000	Los Angeles Country Club (North Course)	Los Angeles, California
2022	(England) Matt Fitzpatrick	274	−6	1 stroke	(United States) Scottie Scheffler (United States) Will Zalatoris	3,150,000	The Country Club (Composite Course)	Brookline, Massachusetts
2021	(Spain) Jon Rahm	278	−6	1 stroke	(South Africa) Louis Oosthuizen	2,250,000	Torrey Pines (South Course)	San Diego, California
2020	(United States) Bryson DeChambeau	274	−6	6 strokes	(United States) Matthew Wolff	2,250,000	Winged Foot (West Course)	Mamaroneck, New York
2019	(United States) Gary Woodland	271	−13	3 strokes	(United States) Brooks Koepka	2,250,000	Pebble Beach	Pebble Beach, California
2018	(United States) Brooks Koepka (2)	281	+1	1 stroke	(England) Tommy Fleetwood	2,160,000	Shinnecock Hills	Shinnecock Hills, New York
2017	(United States) Brooks Koepka	272	−16	4 strokes	(Japan) Hideki Matsuyama (United States) Brian Harman	2,160,000	Erin Hills	Erin, Wisconsin
2016	(United States) Dustin Johnson	276	−4	3 strokes	(United States) Jim Furyk (Republic of Ireland) Shane Lowry (United States) Scott Piercy	1,800,000	Oakmont	Plum, Pennsylvania
2015	(United States) Jordan Spieth	275	−5	1 stroke	(United States) Dustin Johnson (South Africa) Louis Oosthuizen	1,800,000	Chambers Bay	University Place, Washington
2014	(Germany) Martin Kaymer	271	−9	8 strokes	(United States) Erik Compton (United States) Rickie Fowler	1,620,000	Pinehurst Resort (Course No. 2)	Pinehurst, North Carolina
2013	(England) Justin Rose	281	+1	2 strokes	(Australia) Jason Day (United States) Phil Mickelson	1,440,000	Merion (East Course)	Ardmore, Pennsylvania
2012	(United States) Webb Simpson	281	+1	1 stroke	(Northern Ireland) Graeme McDowell (United States) Michael Thompson	1,440,000	Olympic Club (Lake Course)	San Francisco, California (Note: The course straddles the border between Daly City and San Francisco; the club's postal address is in San Francisco.)
2011	(Northern Ireland) Rory McIlroy	268	−16	8 strokes	(Australia) Jason Day	1,440,000	Congressional (Blue Course)	Bethesda, Maryland
2010	(Northern Ireland) Graeme McDowell	284	E	1 stroke	(France) Grégory Havret	1,350,000	Pebble Beach	Pebble Beach, California
2009	(United States) Lucas Glover	276	−4	2 strokes	(United States) Ricky Barnes (United States) David Duval (United States) Phil Mickelson	1,350,000	Bethpage State Park (Black Course)	Farmingdale, New York (Note: Most of the course lies within the hamlet of Old Bethpage, but the clubhouse is in Farmingdale, and the park has a Farmingdale postal address. Both places are within the Town of Oyster Bay.)
2008	(United States) Tiger Woods (3)	283	−1	Playoff	(United States) Rocco Mediate	1,350,000	Torrey Pines (South Course)	San Diego, California
2007	(Argentina) Ángel Cabrera	285	+5	1 stroke	(United States) Jim Furyk (United States) Tiger Woods	1,260,000	Oakmont	Plum, Pennsylvania
2006	(Australia) Geoff Ogilvy	285	+5	1 stroke	(United States) Jim Furyk (United States) Phil Mickelson (Scotland) Colin Montgomerie	1,225,000	Winged Foot (West Course)	Mamaroneck, New York
2005	(New Zealand) Michael Campbell	280	E	2 strokes	(United States) Tiger Woods	1,170,000	Pinehurst Resort (Course No. 2)	Pinehurst, North Carolina
2004	(South Africa) Retief Goosen (2)	276	−4	2 strokes	(United States) Phil Mickelson	1,125,000	Shinnecock Hills	Shinnecock Hills, New York
2003	(United States) Jim Furyk	272	−8	3 strokes	(Australia) Stephen Leaney	1,080,000	Olympia Fields (North Course)	Olympia Fields, Illinois
2002	(United States) Tiger Woods (2)	277	−3	3 strokes	(United States) Phil Mickelson	1,000,000	Bethpage State Park (Black Course)	Farmingdale, New York
2001	(South Africa) Retief Goosen	276	−4	Playoff	(United States) Mark Brooks	900,000	Southern Hills	Tulsa, Oklahoma
2000	(United States) Tiger Woods	272	−12	15 strokes	(South Africa) Ernie Els (Spain) Miguel Ángel Jiménez	800,000	Pebble Beach	Pebble Beach, California
1999	(United States) Payne Stewart (2)	279	−1	1 stroke	(United States) Phil Mickelson	625,000	Pinehurst Resort (Course No. 2)	Pinehurst, North Carolina
1998	(United States) Lee Janzen (2)	280	E	1 stroke	(United States) Payne Stewart	535,000	Olympic Club (Lake Course)	San Francisco, California
1997	(South Africa) Ernie Els (2)	276	−4	1 stroke	(Scotland) Colin Montgomerie	465,000	Congressional (Blue Course)	Bethesda, Maryland
1996	(United States) Steve Jones	278	−2	1 stroke	(United States) Tom Lehman (United States) Davis Love III	425,000	Oakland Hills (South Course)	Bloomfield Hills, Michigan
1995	(United States) Corey Pavin	280	E	2 strokes	(Australia) Greg Norman	350,000	Shinnecock Hills	Shinnecock Hills, New York
1994	(South Africa) Ernie Els	279	−5	Playoff	(Scotland) Colin Montgomerie (United States) Loren Roberts	320,000	Oakmont	Plum, Pennsylvania
1993	(United States) Lee Janzen	272	−8	2 strokes	(United States) Payne Stewart	290,000	Baltusrol (Lower Course)	Springfield, New Jersey
1992	(United States) Tom Kite	285	−3	2 strokes	(United States) Jeff Sluman	275,000	Pebble Beach	Pebble Beach, California
1991	(United States) Payne Stewart	282	−6	Playoff	(United States) Scott Simpson	235,000	Hazeltine National	Chaska, Minnesota
1990	(United States) Hale Irwin (3)	280	−8	Playoff	(United States) Mike Donald	220,000	Medinah (Course No. 3)	Medinah, Illinois
1989	(United States) Curtis Strange (2)	278	−2	1 stroke	(United States) Chip Beck (United States) Mark McCumber (Wales) Ian Woosnam	200,000	Oak Hill (East Course)	Rochester, New York (Note: The club has a Rochester postal address, but is located in the adjacent town of Pittsford.)
1988	(United States) Curtis Strange	278	−6	Playoff	(England) Nick Faldo	180,000	The Country Club (Composite Course)	Brookline, Massachusetts
1987	(United States) Scott Simpson	277	−3	1 stroke	(United States) Tom Watson	150,000	Olympic Club (Lake Course)	San Francisco, California
1986	(United States) Raymond Floyd	279	−1	2 strokes	(United States) Chip Beck (United States) Lanny Wadkins	115,000	Shinnecock Hills	Shinnecock Hills, New York
1985	(United States) Andy North (2)	279	−1	1 stroke	(Canada) Dave Barr (Taiwan) Chen Tze-chung (Zimbabwe) Denis Watson	103,000	Oakland Hills (South Course)	Bloomfield Hills, Michigan
1984	(United States) Fuzzy Zoeller	276	−4	Playoff	(Australia) Greg Norman	94,000	Winged Foot (West Course)	Mamaroneck, New York
1983	(United States) Larry Nelson	280	−4	1 stroke	(United States) Tom Watson	72,000	Oakmont	Plum, Pennsylvania
1982	(United States) Tom Watson	282	−6	2 strokes	(United States) Jack Nicklaus	60,000	Pebble Beach	Pebble Beach, California
1981	(Australia) David Graham	273	−7	3 strokes	(United States) George Burns (United States) Bill Rogers	55,000	Merion (East Course)	Ardmore, Pennsylvania
1980	(United States) Jack Nicklaus (4)	272	−8	2 strokes	(Japan) Isao Aoki	55,000	Baltusrol (Lower Course)	Springfield, New Jersey
1979	(United States) Hale Irwin (2)	284	E	2 strokes	(United States) Jerry Pate (South Africa) Gary Player	50,000	Inverness Club	Toledo, Ohio
1978	(United States) Andy North	285	+1	1 stroke	(United States) J. C. Snead (United States) Dave Stockton	45,000	Cherry Hills	Cherry Hills Village, Colorado
1977	(United States) Hubert Green	278	−2	1 stroke	(United States) Lou Graham	45,000	Southern Hills	Tulsa, Oklahoma
1976	(United States) Jerry Pate	277	−3	2 strokes	(United States) Al Geiberger (United States) Tom Weiskopf	42,000	Atlanta Athletic Club (Highlands Course)	Duluth, Georgia (Note: The club is located in a portion of the Duluth postal area that became part of the newly incorporated city of Johns Creek in 2006. Although the club is still served by the Duluth post office, it now lists its mailing address as Johns Creek.)
1975	(United States) Lou Graham	287	+3	Playoff	(United States) John Mahaffey	40,000	Medinah (Course No. 3)	Medinah, Illinois
1974	(United States) Hale Irwin	287	+7	2 strokes	(United States) Forrest Fezler	35,000	Winged Foot (West Course)	Mamaroneck, New York
1973	(United States) Johnny Miller	279	−5	1 stroke	(United States) John Schlee	35,000	Oakmont	Plum, Pennsylvania
1972	(United States) Jack Nicklaus (3)	290	+2	3 strokes	(Australia) Bruce Crampton	30,000	Pebble Beach	Pebble Beach, California
1971	(United States) Lee Trevino (2)	280	E	Playoff	(United States) Jack Nicklaus	30,000	Merion (East Course)	Ardmore, Pennsylvania
1970	(England) Tony Jacklin	281	−7	7 strokes	(United States) Dave Hill	30,000	Hazeltine National	Chaska, Minnesota
1969	(United States) Orville Moody	281	+1	1 stroke	(United States) Deane Beman (United States) Al Geiberger (United States) Bob Rosburg	30,000	Champions (Cypress Creek Course)	Houston, Texas
1968	(United States) Lee Trevino	275	−5	4 strokes	(United States) Jack Nicklaus	30,000	Oak Hill (East Course)	Rochester, New York
1967	(United States) Jack Nicklaus (2)	275	−5	4 strokes	(United States) Arnold Palmer	30,000	Baltusrol (Lower Course)	Springfield, New Jersey
1966	(United States) Billy Casper (2)	278	−2	Playoff	(United States) Arnold Palmer	26,500	Olympic Club (Lake Course)	San Francisco, California
1965	(South Africa) Gary Player	282	+2	Playoff	(Australia) Kel Nagle	26,000	Bellerive	St. Louis, Missouri (Note: The club has a St. Louis postal address, but is located in the Missouri suburb of Town and Country.)
1964	(United States) Ken Venturi	278	−2	4 strokes	(United States) Tommy Jacobs	17,000	Congressional (Blue Course)	Bethesda, Maryland
1963	(United States) Julius Boros (2)	293	+9	Playoff	(United States) Jacky Cupit (United States) Arnold Palmer	17,500	The Country Club (Composite Course)	Brookline, Massachusetts
1962	(United States) Jack Nicklaus	283	−1	Playoff	(United States) Arnold Palmer	17,500	Oakmont	Plum, Pennsylvania
1961	(United States) Gene Littler	281	+1	1 stroke	(United States) Bob Goalby (United States) Doug Sanders	14,000	Oakland Hills (South Course)	Bloomfield Hills, Michigan
1960	(United States) Arnold Palmer	280	−4	2 strokes	(United States) Jack Nicklaus (a)	14,400	Cherry Hills	Cherry Hills Village, Colorado
1959	(United States) Billy Casper	282	+2	1 stroke	(United States) Bob Rosburg	12,000	Winged Foot (West Course)	Mamaroneck, New York
1958	(United States) Tommy Bolt	283	+3	4 strokes	(South Africa) Gary Player	8,000	Southern Hills	Tulsa, Oklahoma
1957	(United States) Dick Mayer	282	+2	Playoff	(United States) Cary Middlecoff	7,200	Inverness Club	Toledo, Ohio
1956	(United States) Cary Middlecoff (2)	281	+1	1 stroke	(United States) Julius Boros (United States) Ben Hogan	6,000	Oak Hill (East Course)	Rochester, New York
1955	(United States) Jack Fleck	287	+7	Playoff	(United States) Ben Hogan	6,000	Olympic Club (Lake Course)	San Francisco, California
1954	(United States) Ed Furgol	284	+4	1 stroke	(United States) Gene Littler	6,000	Baltusrol (Lower Course)	Springfield, New Jersey
1953	(United States) Ben Hogan (4)	283	−5	6 strokes	(United States) Sam Snead	5,000	Oakmont	Plum, Pennsylvania
1952	(United States) Julius Boros	281	+1	4 strokes	(United States) Ed Oliver	4,000	Northwood Club	Dallas, Texas
1951	(United States) Ben Hogan (3)	287	+7	2 strokes	(United States) Clayton Heafner	4,000	Oakland Hills (South Course)	Bloomfield Hills, Michigan
1950	(United States) Ben Hogan (2)	287	+7	Playoff	(United States) Lloyd Mangrum (2nd) (United States) George Fazio (3rd)	4,000	Merion (East Course)	Ardmore, Pennsylvania
1949	(United States) Cary Middlecoff	286	+2	1 stroke	(United States) Clayton Heafner (United States) Sam Snead	2,000	Medinah (Course No. 3)	Medinah, Illinois
1948	(United States) Ben Hogan	276	−8	2 strokes	(United States) Jimmy Demaret	2,000	Riviera	Pacific Palisades, California (Note: Pacific Palisades is a neighborhood within the city of Los Angeles that has a unique postal identity.)
1947	(United States) Lew Worsham	282	−2	Playoff	(United States) Sam Snead	2,500	St. Louis	Ladue, Missouri
1946	(United States) Lloyd Mangrum	284	−4	Playoff	(United States) Vic Ghezzi (United States) Byron Nelson	1,833	Canterbury	Beachwood, Ohio
1942–1945: Cancelled due to World War II
1941	(United States) Craig Wood	284	+4	3 strokes	(United States) Denny Shute	1,000	Colonial	Fort Worth, Texas
1940	(United States) Lawson Little	287	−1	Playoff	(United States) Gene Sarazen	1,000	Canterbury	Beachwood, Ohio
1939	(United States) Byron Nelson	284	−4	Playoff	(United States) Craig Wood (2nd) (United States) Denny Shute (3rd)	1,000	Philadelphia (Spring Mill Course)	Gladwyne, Pennsylvania
1938	(United States) Ralph Guldahl (2)	284	E	6 strokes	(United States) Dick Metz	1,000	Cherry Hills	Cherry Hills Village, Colorado
1937	(United States) Ralph Guldahl	281	+1	2 strokes	(United States) Sam Snead	1,000	Oakland Hills (South Course)	Bloomfield Hills, Michigan
1936	(United States) Tony Manero	282	−2	2 strokes	(England) Harry Cooper	1,000	Baltusrol (Upper Course)	Springfield, New Jersey
1935	(United States) Sam Parks Jr.	299	+11	2 strokes	(Scotland) Jimmy Thomson	1,000	Oakmont	Plum, Pennsylvania
1934	(United States) Olin Dutra	293	+13	1 stroke	(United States) Gene Sarazen	1,000	Merion (East Course)	Ardmore, Pennsylvania
1933	(United States) Johnny Goodman (a)	287	−1	1 stroke	(United States) Ralph Guldahl	1,000	North Shore	Glenview, Illinois
1932	(United States) Gene Sarazen (2)	286	+6	3 strokes	(Scotland) Bobby Cruickshank (England) Philip Perkins	1,000	Fresh Meadow	Queens, New York
1931	(United States) Billy Burke	292	+4	Playoff	(United States) George Von Elm	1,750	Inverness Club	Toledo, Ohio
1930	(United States) Bobby Jones (a) (4)	287	−1	2 strokes	(Scotland) Macdonald Smith	1,000	Interlachen	Edina, Minnesota
1929	(United States) Bobby Jones (a) (3)	294		Playoff	(United States) Al Espinosa	1,000	Winged Foot (West Course)	Mamaroneck, New York
1928	(United States) Johnny Farrell	294		Playoff	(United States) Bobby Jones (a)	500	Olympia Fields (North Course)	Olympia Fields, Illinois
1927	(United States) Tommy Armour	301		Playoff	(England) Harry Cooper	500	Oakmont	Plum, Pennsylvania
1926	(United States) Bobby Jones (a) (2)	293		1 stroke	(United States) Joe Turnesa	500	Scioto	Columbus, Ohio
1925	(Scotland) Willie Macfarlane	291		Playoff	(United States) Bobby Jones (a)	500	Worcester	Worcester, Massachusetts
1924	(England) Cyril Walker	297		3 strokes	(United States) Bobby Jones (a)	500	Oakland Hills (South Course)	Bloomfield Hills, Michigan
1923	(United States) Bobby Jones (a)	296		Playoff	(Scotland) Bobby Cruickshank	500	Inwood	Inwood, New York
1922	(United States) Gene Sarazen	288		1 stroke	(Scotland) John Black (United States) Bobby Jones (a)	500	Skokie	Glencoe, Illinois
1921	(England) Jim Barnes	289		9 strokes	(United States) Walter Hagen (Scotland) Fred McLeod	500	Columbia	Chevy Chase, Maryland
1920	(Jersey) Ted Ray	295		1 stroke	(United States) Jack Burke Sr. (United States) Leo Diegel (United States) Jock Hutchison (Jersey) Harry Vardon	500	Inverness Club	Toledo, Ohio
1919	(United States) Walter Hagen (2)	301		Playoff	(United States) Mike Brady	500	Brae Burn (Main Course)	West Newton, Massachusetts
1917–1918: Cancelled due to World War I
1916	(United States) Chick Evans (a)	286		2 strokes	(Scotland) Jock Hutchison	300	The Minikahda Club	Minneapolis, Minnesota
1915	(United States) Jerome Travers (a)	297		1 stroke	(United States) Tom McNamara	300	Baltusrol (Revised Course)	Springfield, New Jersey
1914	(United States) Walter Hagen	290		1 stroke	(United States) Chick Evans (a)	300	Midlothian	Midlothian, Illinois
1913	(United States) Francis Ouimet (a)	304		Playoff	(Jersey) Harry Vardon (2nd) (Jersey) Ted Ray (3rd)	300	The Country Club	Brookline, Massachusetts
1912	(United States) John McDermott (2)	294		2 strokes	(United States) Tom McNamara	300	Country Club of Buffalo	Buffalo, New York
1911	(United States) John McDermott	307		Playoff	(United States) Mike Brady (2nd) (United States) George Simpson (3rd)	300	Chicago	Wheaton, Illinois
1910	(Scotland) Alex Smith (2)	298		Playoff	(United States) John McDermott (2nd) (Scotland) Macdonald Smith (3rd)	300	Philadelphia Cricket Club (St. Martin's Course)	Philadelphia, Pennsylvania
1909	(England) George Sargent	290		4 strokes	(United States) Tom McNamara	300	Englewood	Englewood, New Jersey
1908	(Scotland) Fred McLeod	322		Playoff	(Scotland) Willie Smith	300	Myopia Hunt Club	South Hamilton, Massachusetts
1907	(Scotland) Alec Ross	302		2 strokes	(England) Gilbert Nicholls	300	Philadelphia Cricket Club (St. Martin's Course)	Philadelphia, Pennsylvania
1906	(Scotland) Alex Smith	295		7 strokes	(Scotland) Willie Smith	300	Onwentsia Club	Lake Forest, Illinois
1905	(Scotland) Willie Anderson (4)	314		2 strokes	(Scotland) Alex Smith	200	Myopia Hunt Club	South Hamilton, Massachusetts
1904	(Scotland) Willie Anderson (3)	303		4 strokes	(England) Gilbert Nicholls	200	Glen View Club	Golf, Illinois
1903	(Scotland) Willie Anderson (2)	307		Playoff	(Scotland) David Brown	200	Baltusrol (Original Course)	Springfield, New Jersey
1902	(Scotland) Laurie Auchterlonie	307		6 strokes	(Scotland) Stewart Gardner (United States) Walter Travis (a)	200	Garden City	Garden City, New York
1901	(Scotland) Willie Anderson	331		Playoff	(Scotland) Alex Smith	200	Myopia Hunt Club	South Hamilton, Massachusetts
1900	(Jersey) Harry Vardon	313		2 strokes	(England) John Henry Taylor	200	Chicago	Wheaton, Illinois
1899	(Scotland) Willie Smith	315		11 strokes	(Scotland) Val Fitzjohn (Scotland) George Low Sr. (England) Bert Way	150	Baltimore (Roland Park Course)	Baltimore, Maryland
1898	(Scotland) Fred Herd	328		7 strokes	(Scotland) Alex Smith	150	Myopia Hunt Club	South Hamilton, Massachusetts
1897	(England) Joe Lloyd	162		1 stroke	(Scotland) Willie Anderson	150	Chicago	Wheaton, Illinois
1896	(Scotland) James Foulis	152		3 strokes	(England) Horace Rawlins	150	Shinnecock Hills	Shinnecock Hills, New York
1895	(England) Horace Rawlins	173		2 strokes	(Scotland) Willie Dunn	150	Newport	Newport, Rhode Island

== Summary by course, state and region ==
The U.S. Open has been played on 52 different golf courses; 22 in the Northeast, 18 in the Midwest, 6 in the South, and 6 in the West.

Legend
State totals – preceding courses are in that state
Division totals – Divisions as defined by U.S. Census Bureau
Region totals – each is composed of 2 or 3 divisions
Total U.S. Opens

Col. 4 shows larger region which contains entity in col. 1
Course/State/Region	No.	Years hosted	Geog. sort
Myopia Hunt Club	4	1908, 1905, 1901, 1898	MA
The Country Club	4	2022, 1988, 1963, 1913	MA
Worcester Country Club	1	1925	MA
Brae Burn Country Club	1	1919	MA
Total Massachusetts	10		NewEng
Newport Country Club	1	1895	RI
Total Rhode Island	1		NewEng
Total New England	11		NEast
Winged Foot Golf Club	6	2020, 2006, 1984, 1974, 1959, 1929	NY
Shinnecock Hills Golf Club	6	2026, 2018, 2004, 1995, 1986, 1896	NY
Oak Hill Country Club	3	1989, 1968, 1956	NY
Bethpage Black Course	2	2009, 2002	NY
Fresh Meadow Country Club	1	1932	NY
Inwood Country Club	1	1923	NY
Country Club of Buffalo	1	1912	NY
Garden City Golf Club	1	1902	NY
Total New York	21		MidAtl
Oakmont Country Club	10	2025, 2016, 2007, 1994, 1983, 1973, 1962, 1953, 1935, 1927	PA
Merion Golf Club	5	2013, 1981, 1971, 1950, 1934	PA
Philadelphia Cricket Club	2	1910, 1907	PA
Philadelphia Country Club	1	1939	PA
Total Pennsylvania	18		MidAtl
Baltusrol Golf Club	7	1993, 1980, 1967, 1954, 1936, 1915, 1903	NJ
Englewood Golf Club	1	1909	NJ
Total New Jersey	8		MidAtl
Congressional Country Club	3	2011, 1997, 1964	MD
Baltimore Country Club	1	1899	MD
Columbia Country Club	1	1921	MD
Total Maryland	5		MidAtl
Total Mid-Atlantic	51		NEast
Total Northeast	63		USA
Pinehurst Resort	4	2024, 2014, 2005, 1999	NC
Total North Carolina	4		SthAtl
Atlanta Athletic Club	1	1976	GA
Total Georgia	1		SthAtl
Total South Atlantic	5		South
Total East South Central	0		South
Southern Hills Country Club	3	2001, 1977, 1958	OK
Total Oklahoma	3		WSC
Champions Golf Club	1	1969	TX
Colonial Country Club	1	1941	TX
Northwood Club	1	1952	TX
Total Texas	3		WSC
Total West South Central	6		South
Total South	11		USA
Medinah Country Club	3	1990, 1975, 1949	IL
Chicago Golf Club	3	1911, 1900, 1897	IL
Olympia Fields Country Club	2	2003, 1928	IL
North Shore Country Club	1	1933	IL
Skokie Country Club	1	1922	IL
Midlothian Country Club	1	1914	IL
Onwentsia Club	1	1906	IL
Glen View Club	1	1904	IL
Total Illinois	13		ENC
Inverness Club	4	1979, 1957, 1931, 1920	OH
Canterbury Golf Club	2	1946, 1940	OH
Scioto Country Club	1	1926	OH
Total Ohio	7		ENC
Oakland Hills Country Club	6	1996, 1985, 1961, 1951, 1937, 1924	MI
Total Michigan	6		ENC
Total East North Central	26		Midwest
Hazeltine National Golf Club	2	1991, 1970	MN
Interlachen Country Club	1	1930	MN
The Minikahda Club	1	1916	MN
Total Minnesota	4		WNC
Bellerive Country Club	1	1965	MO
St. Louis Country Club	1	1947	MO
Total Missouri	2		WNC
Erin Hills	1	2017	WI
Total Wisconsin	1		WNC
Total West North Central	7		Midwest
Total Midwest	33		USA
Cherry Hills Country Club	3	1978, 1960, 1938	CO
Total Colorado	3		Mtn
Total Mountain	3		West
Pebble Beach Golf Links	6	2019, 2010, 2000, 1992, 1982, 1972	CA
Olympic Club	5	2012, 1998, 1987, 1966, 1955	CA
Torrey Pines Golf Course	2	2021, 2008	CA
Los Angeles Country Club	1	2023	CA
Riviera Country Club	1	1948	CA
Total California	15		Pac
Chambers Bay	1	2015	WA
Total Washington	1		Pac
Total Pacific	16		West
Total West	19		USA
Total U.S. Opens	126		

The 18th state to host the tournament was Washington in 2015, followed by the 19th state, Wisconsin, in 2017.

== Records ==
- Oldest champion: Hale Irwin in 1990 at 45 years, 15 days.
- Youngest champion: John McDermott in 1911 at 19 years, 315 days.
- Oldest player to make the cut: Sam Snead in 1973 at 61 years old. He tied for 29th place.
- Most victories: 4 by Willie Anderson 1901, 1903–1905; Bobby Jones 1923, 1926, 1929–30; Ben Hogan 1948, 1950–51, 1953; Jack Nicklaus 1962, 1967, 1972, 1980. NOTE: Hogan also won the 1942 Hale America National Open which was held jointly by the USGA, PGA and Chicago GA for the benefit of the Navy Relief Society and the USO.
- Most consecutive victories: 3 by Willie Anderson 1903–1905.
- Most consecutive victorious attempts: 3 by Ben Hogan 1948, 1950–51
- Most consecutive attempts in top 2: 5 by Bobby Jones 1922–1926
- Most consecutive attempts in top 5: 6 by Willie Anderson 1901–1906
- Most consecutive attempts in top 10: 16 by Ben Hogan 1940–1960 (next highest streak 7)
- Most runner-up finishes: 6, Phil Mickelson (1999, 2002, 2004, 2006, 2009, 2013)
- Most consecutive Opens started: 44 by Jack Nicklaus from 1957 to 2000.
- Largest margin of victory: 15 strokes by Tiger Woods, 2000. This is the all-time record for all majors.
- Lowest score for 36 holes: 130 – Martin Kaymer (65–65), rounds 1–2, 2014; Rickie Fowler (62-68), rounds 1-2, 2023.
- Lowest score for 54 holes: 199 – Rory McIlroy (65–66–68), rounds 1–3, 2011; Louis Oosthuizen (66-66-67), rounds 2–4, 2015.
- Lowest score for 72 holes: 268 – Rory McIlroy (65–66–68–69), rounds 1–4, 2011.
- Most strokes under par for 72 holes: 16 under (268) by Rory McIlroy, 2011; 16 under (272) by Brooks Koepka, 2017.
- Most strokes under par at any point in the tournament: 17 by Rory McIlroy, final round, 2011.
- Lowest score for 18 holes: 62 – Rickie Fowler and Xander Schauffele, 1st round, 2023.
- Lowest score for 18 holes in relation to par: 9 under (63) – Justin Thomas, 3rd round, 2017.
- All four rounds under par (golfers who did not win the tournament in italics):
  - Lee Trevino, 1968 (69–68–69–69, par 70)
  - Tony Jacklin, 1970 (71–70–70–70, par 72)
  - Lee Janzen, 1993 (67–67–69–69, par 70)
  - Curtis Strange, 1994 (70–70–70–70, par 71)
  - Rory McIlroy (65–66–68–69, par 71) and Robert Garrigus (70–70–68–70), 2011
  - Brooks Koepka (67–70–68–67, par 72), Charley Hoffman (70–70–68–71), and Brandt Snedeker (70–69–70–71), 2017
- All four rounds under 70: Trevino, 1968; Janzen, 1993; McIlroy, 2011.
- Most frequent venues:
  - 10 Opens: Oakmont Country Club – 1927, 1935, 1953, 1962, 1973, 1983, 1994, 2007, 2016, 2025
  - 7 Opens: Baltusrol Golf Club – 1903, 1915, 1936, 1954, 1967, 1980, 1993
  - 6 Opens:
    - Oakland Hills Country Club – 1924, 1937, 1951, 1961, 1985, 1996
    - Pebble Beach Golf Links – 1972, 1982, 1992, 2000, 2010, 2019
    - Winged Foot Golf Club – 1929, 1959, 1974, 1984, 2006, 2020
    - Shinnecock Hills Golf Club – 1896, 1986, 1995, 2004, 2018, 2026
  - 5 Opens:
    - Olympic Club – 1955, 1966, 1987, 1998, 2012
    - Merion Golf Club – 1934, 1950, 1971, 1981, 2013
  - 4 Opens:
    - Myopia Hunt Club – 1898, 1901, 1905, 1908
    - Inverness Club – 1920, 1931, 1957, 1979
    - The Country Club – 1913, 1963, 1988, 2022
    - Pinehurst Resort – 1999, 2005, 2014, 2024

There is an extensive records section on the official U.S. Open website.

== Broadcasting ==
Beginning with the 2020 tournament, NBC Sports holds domestic television rights (with coverage on NBC, USA Network and Peacock), having taken over the remainder of the 12-year deal with the USGA signed by Fox Sports in 2013 that gave it exclusive rights to USGA championships from 2015 through 2026. With the postponed 2020 U.S. Open Championship presenting a significant scheduling challenge due to its other fall sports commitments, Fox had held discussions with the USGA over broadcasting the tournament on their cable network FS1 or partnering with NBC. Ultimately, the issues led the network to transfer the final seven years of its contract entirely.

In 2020 and 2021, early round NBC cable coverage was carried on Golf Channel. Beginning with the 2022 tournament this coverage was moved to USA Network, as part of an expansion of its sports programming amid the closure of NBCSN. Golf Channel also presents rolling coverage of the sectional qualifiers, billed as Golf's Longest Day. Beginning with the new contract, the final hour of network coverage for the first and second rounds moved exclusively to Peacock. In August 2025, NBCUniversal and its impending spin-off Versant renewed their rights to the U.S. Open and other USGA tournaments from 2027 through 2032.

Coverage was previously televised by NBC and ESPN through 2014. NBC's first period as rightsholder began in 1995; ABC held the broadcast rights from 1966 through 1994.

In Australia, from 2015 Fox Sports Australia is the exclusive broadcaster of the U.S. open until 2018.

== Future sites ==
Year	Edition	Course	Location	Dates	Previous championships hosted
2027	127th	Pebble Beach Golf Links	Pebble Beach, California	Jun 17–20	1972, 1982, 1992, 2000, 2010, 2019
2028	128th	Winged Foot Golf Club, West Course	Mamaroneck, New York	Jun 15–18	1929, 1959, 1974, 1984, 2006, 2020
2029	129th	Pinehurst Resort, Course No. 2	Pinehurst, North Carolina	Jun 14–17	1999, 2005, 2014, 2024
2030	130th	Merion Golf Club, East Course	Ardmore, Pennsylvania	Jun 13–16	1934, 1950, 1971, 1981, 2013
2031	131st	Riviera Country Club	Los Angeles, California	Jun 12–15	1948
2032	132nd	Pebble Beach Golf Links	Pebble Beach, California	Jun 17–20	1972, 1982, 1992, 2000, 2010, 2019, 2027
2033	133rd	Oakmont Country Club	Plum, Pennsylvania	Jun 16–19	1927, 1935, 1953, 1962, 1973, 1983, 1994, 2007, 2016, 2025
2034	134th	Oakland Hills Country Club, South Course	Bloomfield Hills, Michigan	Jun 15–18	1924, 1937, 1951, 1961, 1985, 1996
2035	135th	Pinehurst Resort, Course No. 2	Pinehurst, North Carolina	Jun 14–17	1999, 2005, 2014, 2024, 2029
2036	136th	Shinnecock Hills Golf Club	Shinnecock Hills, New York	Jun 12–15	1896, 1986, 1995, 2004, 2018, 2026
2037	137th	Pebble Beach Golf Links	Pebble Beach, California	Jun 18–21	1972, 1982, 1992, 2000, 2010, 2019, 2027, 2032
2038	138th	The Country Club	Brookline, Massachusetts	Jun 17–20	1913, 1963, 1988, 2022
2039	139th	Los Angeles Country Club, North Course	Los Angeles, California	Jun 16–19	2023
2040	140th	Merion Golf Club, East Course	Ardmore, Pennsylvania	Jun 14–17	1934, 1950, 1971, 1981, 2013, 2030
2041	141st	Pinehurst Resort, Course No. 2	Pinehurst, North Carolina	Jun 13–16	1999, 2005, 2014, 2024, 2029, 2035
2042	142nd	Oakmont Country Club	Plum, Pennsylvania	Jun 12–15	1927, 1935, 1953, 1962, 1973, 1983, 1994, 2007, 2016, 2025, 2033
2043	143rd	TBD	TBD	TBD	TBD
2044	144th	Pebble Beach Golf Links	Pebble Beach, California	Jun 16–19	1972, 1982, 1992, 2000, 2010, 2019, 2027, 2032, 2037
2045	145th	Inverness Club	Toledo, Ohio	Jun 15–18	1920, 1931, 1957, 1979
2046	146th	Baltusrol Golf Club, Lower Course	Springfield, New Jersey	Jun 14–17	1903, 1915, 1936, 1954, 1967, 1980, 1993
2047	147th	Pinehurst Resort, Course No. 2	Pinehurst, North Carolina	Jun 13–16	1999, 2005, 2014, 2024, 2029, 2035, 2041
2048	148th	TBD	TBD	TBD	TBD
2049	149th	Oakmont Country Club	Plum, Pennsylvania	Jun 17–20	1927, 1935, 1953, 1962, 1973, 1983, 1994, 2007, 2016, 2025, 2033, 2042
2050	150th	Merion Golf Club, East Course	Ardmore, Pennsylvania	Jun 16–19	1934, 1950, 1971, 1981, 2013, 2030, 2040
2051	151st	Oakland Hills Country Club, South Course	Bloomfield Hills, Michigan	Jun 15–18	1924, 1937, 1951, 1961, 1985, 1996, 2034

== See also ==
- Golf in the United States
- Open golf tournament
