= Willie Smith (golfer) =

Scottish amateur golfer (1876–1916)

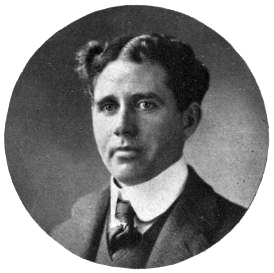

Personal information
- Full name: William Smith
- Nationality: Scotland
- Born: 8 October 1876 Dundee, Scotland
- Died: 26 December 1916 (aged 40) Mexico City, Mexico

Career
- Sport: Golf
- Status: Professional
- Professional wins: 3

Best results in major championships (wins: 1)
- Masters Tournament: DNP
- PGA Championship: DNP
- U.S. Open: Won: 1899
- The Open Championship: T5: 1910

Willie Smith (8 October 1876 – 26 December 1916) was a Scottish golfer. He won the 1899 U.S. Open.

== Early life ==
Willie Smith was born in Dundee, Scotland on 8 October 1876. He learned to play golf in Carnoustie. His brothers Alex and Macdonald were also expert golfers.

== Golf career ==
Smith worked as a club professional at Midlothian Country Club, near Chicago, in his early adulthood. During this time he won the 1899 U.S. Open, played at Baltimore Country Club's Roland Park Course. He won by a margin of eleven shots. This record wasn't broken during the entire 20th century and wasn't surpassed until Tiger Woods won the 2000 championship by fifteen shots. Smith's prize was $150. He played in nine U.S. Opens in total, and made the top-10 in eight of them, but he did not win again.

In 1899, Smith won the first Western Open in a playoff against Laurie Auchterlonie. He also won the 1900 California State Open.

In 1904, Smith moved to Mexico City to become the golf pro at the Mexico City Country Club. He was injured during the Mexican Revolution. He had refused to leave his post at the country club and was found trapped under a fallen beam after Emiliano Zapata's troops ransacked the club which they saw as a symbol of the corrupt ruling class. He was tasked with designing a new course, the Club de Golf Chapultepec, however due to his death it was completed by his brother Alex Smith.

== Death ==
Smith died of pneumonia on 26 December 1916. His body was returned to Scotland for burial in the family plot.

== Professional wins (3) ==
=== PGA Tour wins (1) ===
- 1899 Western Open

=== Other wins (2) ===
- 1899 U.S. Open
- 1900 California State Open

== Major championships ==
=== Wins (1) ===
Year	Championship	54 holes	Winning score	Margin	Runners-up
1899	U.S. Open	4 shot lead	77-82-79-77=315	11 strokes	(Scotland) Val Fitzjohn, (Scotland) George Low, (England) Bert Way

=== Results timeline ===
Smith played in only the U.S. Open and The Open Championship.

Tournament	1895	1896	1897	1898	1899	1900	1901	1902	1903	1904	1905	1906	1907	1908	1909	1910
U.S. Open				5	1	5	3	4	T9		T13	2		2		
The Open Championship	WD															T5

Win
Top 10
Did not play

WD = withdrew
"T" indicates a tie for a place
