= Myopia Hunt Club =

Foxhunting and private country club in South Hamilton, Massachusetts

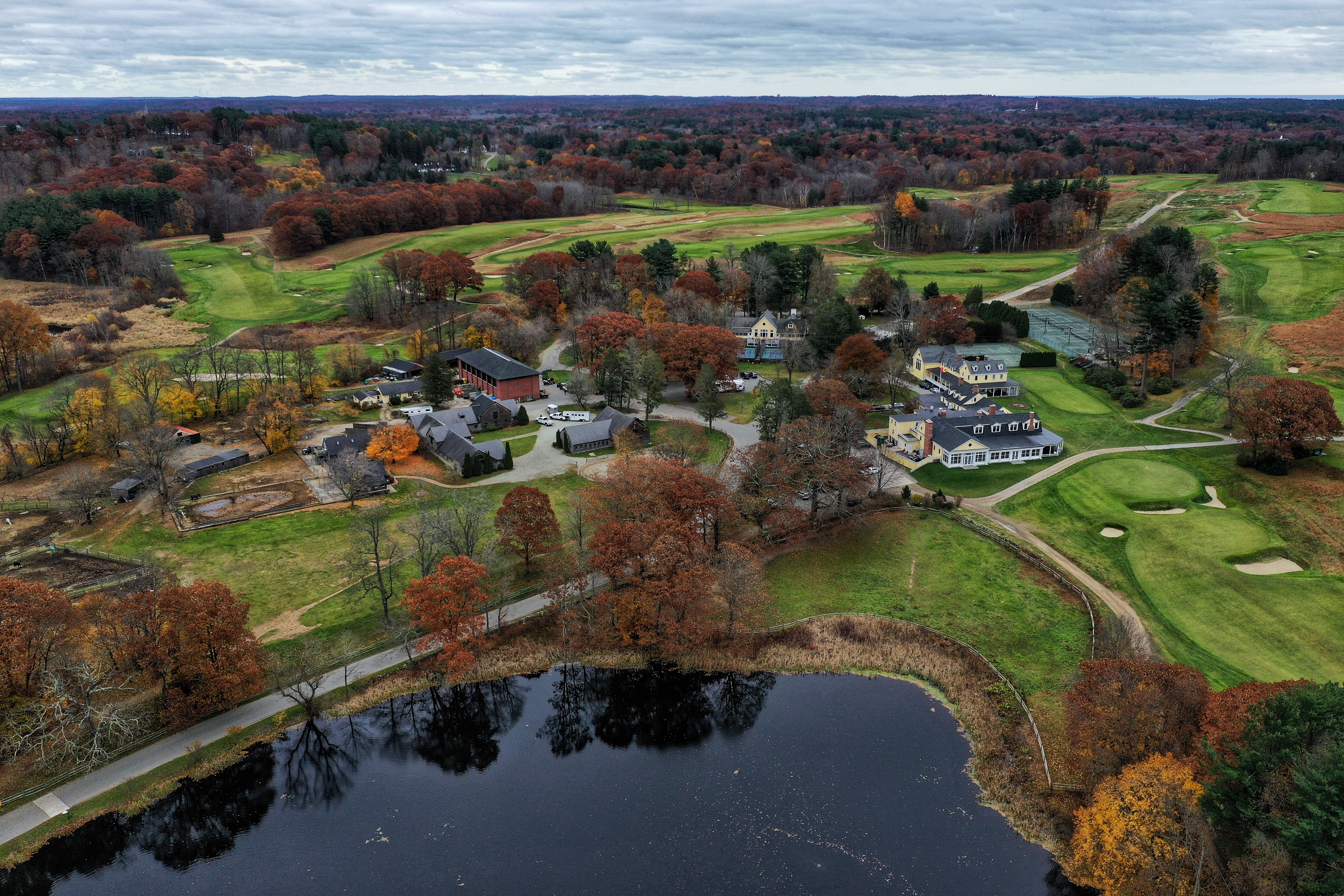
- Myopia Hunt Club From Above

- Location within the United States Location within Massachusetts
- 42.609°N 70.859°W

Club information
- Location: 435 Bay Road; South Hamilton, Massachusetts, United States
- Elevation: 40–130 feet (12–40 m)
- Established: 1882; 144 years ago
- Type: Private
- Tota holes: 18
- Website: www.myopiahuntclub.com
- Designed by: Herbert C. Leeds
- Par: 72
- Length: 6,539 yards (5,979 m)
- Course rating: 72.7
- Slope rating: 138

Myopia Hunt Club is a foxhunting and private country club in South Hamilton, Massachusetts, northeast of Boston. The club hosted the U.S. Open golf tournament four times in its early days: 1898, 1901, 1905, and 1908.

== History ==
Myopia Hunt Club was founded in 1882 by J. Murray Forbes. The golf course was designed and built by Herbert C. Leeds in 1894 and he continued working at the Club for over 30 years. Leeds tied for seventh place in the 1898 U.S. Open held at Myopia Hunt Club. His familiarity with the course was no doubt a factor in his ability to finish so high on the leaderboard in the tournament.

The name "Myopia" is due to some of its founding members having come from the Myopia Club in Winchester, Massachusetts, which had been founded by four brothers with poor vision, or myopia. Today, the Myopia Hunt Club is a drag hunt, meaning that the hounds follow a laid scent rather than live fox.

When completed, Myopia Hunt Club measured 6,539 yards and Leeds made certain that golfers would encounter a multitude of challenging features, including tall mounds, deep bunkers, lightning-fast greens, blind shots requiring substantial carry, deep swales, punishing rough, plateaued greens, as well as a pond and paddock to avoid. So difficult was the course that in the 1901 U.S. Open not a single professional was able to break 80 in any round.

== Polo ==
Myopia also owns one of the oldest continually running polo fields in the nation. Gibney Field, formerly used as a pasture, was mowed and used for practice in the summer of 1888. That fall, Myopia held its first official match against the Dedham Polo and Country Club. In 1890, Myopia became one of seven charter members of the Polo Association, now the United States Polo Association. Of those seven original clubs, only Myopia and Meadowbrook on Long Island still exist. Myopia is the only one that still uses its original field.

Gibney Field is not, however, the oldest continuously used polo field in the nation. That honor goes to Aiken Polo Club's Whitney Field—in Aiken, South Carolina—which was first used for polo in a gala exhibition match in 1882. Aiken Polo Club joined the Polo Association in 1899. Polo is still played at Myopia throughout the summer season, from Memorial Day until Columbus Day. Sunday games at 3 p.m. are open to the public for a small fee. In 1902 a real tennis court was opened at the Myopia Hunt Club, but has since been converted to other uses.

== Golf ==
Myopia Hunt Club is the only course in the United States to have been listed by Golf Magazine as having two of the United States's top 100 signature holes: the fourth and ninth.

The U.S. Open was held at the Club in 1898, 1901, 1905, and 1908. The 72-hole winning score in 1901 by Willie Anderson, one of only four four-time champions, was 331, a record high that still stands today. He defeated Alex Smith in an 18-hole playoff, 85 to 86, his highest 18-hole score of the tournament. The first nine was completed in 1896, but the second nine was not finished until October 1898, so the June 1898 U.S. Open was actually played over eight rounds of nine holes.

=== Myopia Hunt Club scorecard ===
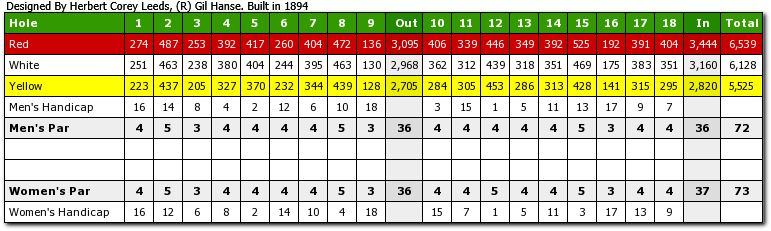

From 1995–2005, the course underwent a series of major improvements under the leadership of Club president Michael Greene. Greene, along with Captain of Golf Steve Warhover (and with the consent of the voting members of the Club), lengthened the course with several new tees. These were installed on the 2nd, 4th, 7th, 10th, 11th, 15th, and 18th holes. In addition, many trees throughout the course were removed and replaced with traditional mounds, better fitting the historic design of Herbert Corey Leeds.

Myopia Hunt Club was the home course of the late novelist and golf writer John Updike.

The holes on the course are all named on the scorecard, with most of the names pertaining to a geographic signifier on a particular hole:

1. First
2. Lookout
3. Brae
4. Miles River
5. Lone Tree
6. Brook
7. Myopia
8. Prairie
9. Pond
10. Alps
11. Road
12. Valley
13. Hill
14. Ridge
15. Long
16. Paddock
17. West
18. Home

== See also ==
- Myopia Club (of Winchester, Massachusetts)
