= South Hamilton, Massachusetts =

- Postal Address
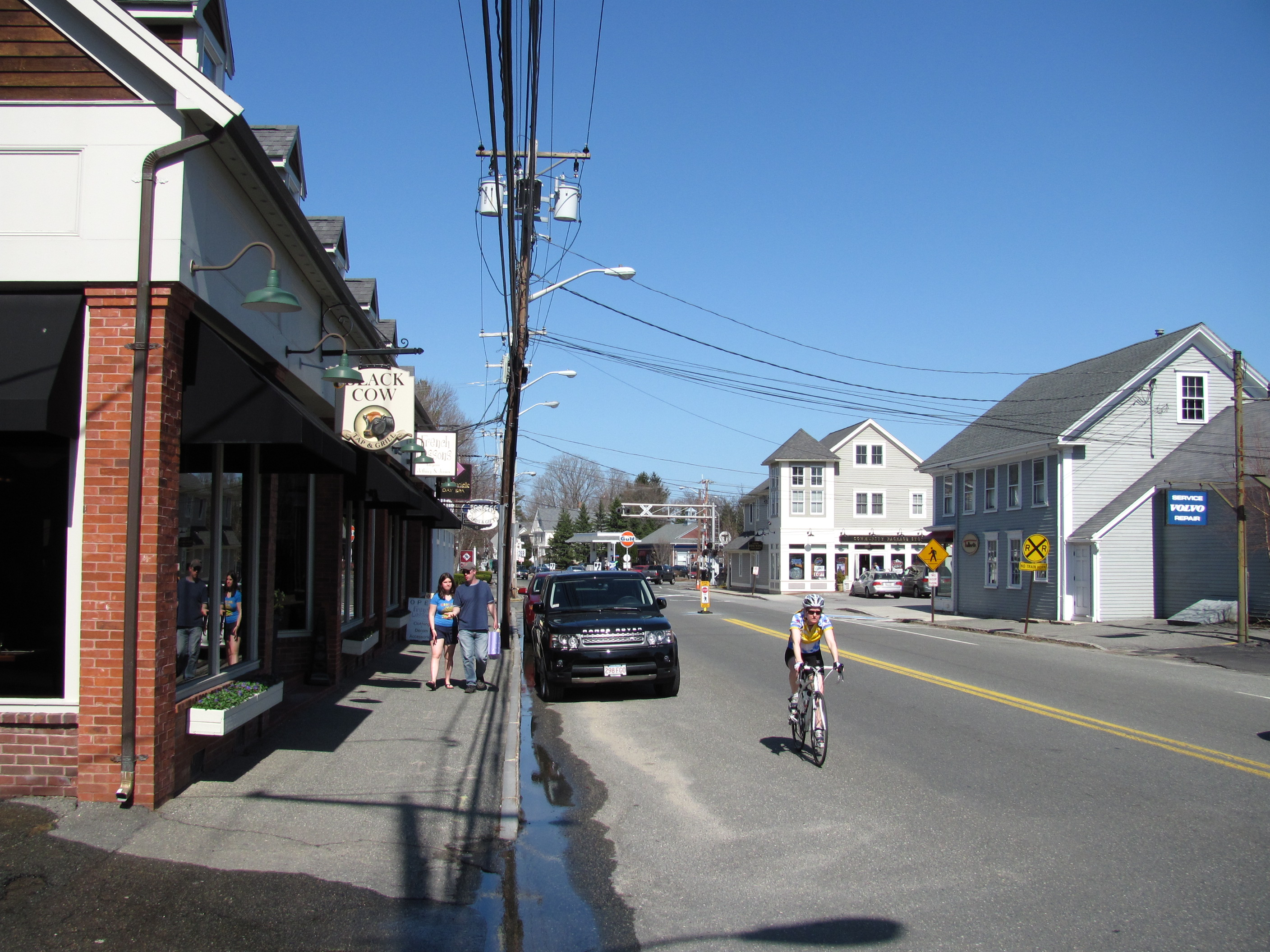
- Looking north on Bay Road

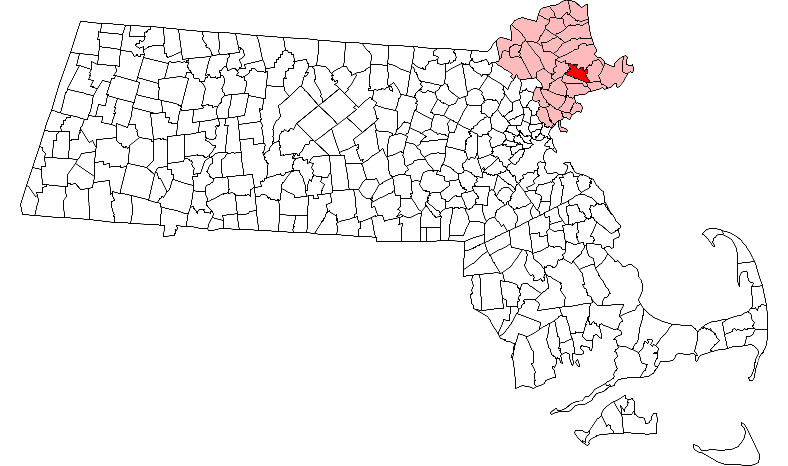
- Location in Massachusetts
- Coordinates: 42°37′10.95″N 70°51′17.24″W
- Country: United States
- State: Massachusetts
- County: Essex
- Town: Hamilton
- Time zone: UTC-5 (Eastern)
  - Summer (DST): UTC-4 (Eastern)
- ZIP code: 01982
- Area code: 978

South Hamilton is a postal address assigned to ZIP code 01982 by the Postal Service and is part of the town of Hamilton, Essex County, Massachusetts, United States (ZIP code 01936). The designation arose in the 1960s when the Postal Service built a new modern post office in downtown Hamilton with the intention of closing the original post office 2 miles north on the same road. Due to public objection, the original post office was preserved and remains open to this day. To distinguish between the two post offices in an era when the use of ZIP code was not yet mandatory, the new post office was designated the "South Hamilton" post office.

The Postal Service followed through with moving most of their operations, including all delivery operations, to the new post office. Thus almost all mail delivered within the town of Hamilton carries the "South Hamilton" postal address and the 01982 ZIP code. Only mail destined for P.O. Boxes located within the old post office and a few nearby buildings still carries the "Hamilton" postal address and the 01936 zip code.

== In popular culture ==
Bo Burnham's song "I'm Bo Yo" includes the lyric "I'm representing you/I'm representing the people from the 01982", a reference to Burnham's home town of Hamilton.
