= 2007 U.S. Open (golf) =

Tournament information
- Dates: June 14–17, 2007
- Location: Oakmont, Pennsylvania; 40.526°N 79.827°W
- Course: Oakmont Country Club
- Organized by: USGA
- Tours: PGA Tour; European Tour; Japan Golf Tour

Statistics
- Par: 70
- Length: 7,230 yards (6,611 m)
- Field: 156 players, 63 after cut
- Cut: 150 (+10)
- Prize fund: $7,000,000 €5,241,402
- Winner's share: $1,260,000 €943,183

Champion
- (Argentina) Ángel Cabrera
- 285 (+5)

Location map
- Location in the United States Location in Pennsylvania

The 2007 United States Open Championship was the 107th U.S. Open, held June 14–17 at Oakmont Country Club in Oakmont, Pennsylvania, a suburb northeast of Pittsburgh.

Ángel Cabrera won his first major championship, one stroke ahead of runners-up Jim Furyk and Tiger Woods, who were unable to birdie the 72nd hole to force a Monday playoff. Cabrera's victory marked the first U.S. Open won by an Argentine or a South American. It was the first of his two major titles; he won the Masters in a playoff in 2009.

This was the eighth U.S. Open and eleventh professional major held at Oakmont.

== History of the U.S. Open at Oakmont ==
The championship committee of the United States Golf Association chose Oakmont Country Club as the host for 2007 on October 2, 2001. The USGA had also recently decided to award Oakmont its 13th USGA national championship, the U.S. Amateur, only four years before the 14th national championship to be held at Oakmont. Oakmont's prestige in the golf community was irrefutable as the list of champions includes Tommy Armour (1927), Sam Parks, Jr. (1935), Ben Hogan (1953), Jack Nicklaus (1962), Johnny Miller (1973), Larry Nelson (1983), and Ernie Els (1994). Oakmont had already provided the golf world with some of the most exciting championships of golf history including Miller's record for the lowest score shot in a USGA championship, a 63 (−8) in 1973, and the dramatic Monday finish in 1994 between Els, Loren Roberts, and Colin Montgomerie.

== Preparation for the 2007 U.S. Open ==
The 107th U.S. Open was Oakmont's first USGA event since the U.S. Amateur in 2004. The USGA, American Golf's governing body, found setting up and preparing for the Open easier than other locations. Rob Zalzneck, the director of the 2007 Open for the USGA commented on the readiness of the course saying, "We're so far ahead with our plans and what we need to get done, Oakmont is just such an ideal situation for us. The club welcomes us with open arms, and we've had such great championships here in the past. What everyone will see, though, is the unbelievable difference in the size of the event from 1994 (when Oakmont last hosted the Open) and this year." It was thought that the usual Open conditions would still exist, including the lightning fast greens and unusually high rough, as many of these features were common year round at Oakmont Country Club leading up to the Open. In fact, Oakmont's greens were so fast that the USGA directed the club to slow them down for the Open, although they were still much faster than what would be found at a normal tour event.

Preparation began in 2002 and 2003 and included minor renovation to the course, most notably the lengthening of the course for the world's best players, small renovations to the clubhouse, and also the deepening of Oakmont's storied bunkers. Other changes to the course since the last Open in 1994 included the addition of a bridge to connect to holes 2–8, which posed as a major problem causing player and pedestrian jams over the Pennsylvania Turnpike. The USGA recruited some 5,000 volunteers in order to insure the event progresses smoothly. The event was expected to, like the last Open at Oakmont, attract record breaking sell-out crowds. Crowd control was also a major problem for the USGA and its volunteers as huge crowds filled the course during the tournament creating traffic problems. The USGA began selling tickets to the general public on June 15, 2006. The USGA was expected to sell out all of their tickets for the competitive rounds by their deadline for purchase on August 15, 2006. After the sale of all tickets for the competitive rounds, any post-deadline purchases were settled by a lottery.

== Partnership with American Express ==
For the first time in its history, the United States Golf Association entered into a commercial partnership. It entered into an agreement with American Express for an undisclosed amount, which allowed American Express to set up a special "Trophy Room" area at the 2007 U.S. Open for American Express cardholders. Jud Linville, president of American Express U.S. Consumer Card Services, addressed concern about the arrangement commercializing the USGA Championship, saying, “We’re not going to be slapping logos all over the place, we’re trying to broaden the appeal of the game.” Long-time American Express sponsorship recipient Tiger Woods told the media in response to the deal, “It’s a tremendous opportunity, this is two enormous brands coming together to help golf.”

== Field ==
About half the field each year consists of players who are fully exempt from qualifying for the U.S. Open. Below is the list of the 72 players that were fully exempt for the 2007 U.S. Open. Each player is classified according to the first category by which he qualified, but other categories are shown in parentheses:

1. Last 10 U.S. Open Champions

Michael Campbell, Ernie Els (4,9,10,16), Jim Furyk (8,9,12,16), Retief Goosen (9,10,13,16), Lee Janzen, Geoff Ogilvy (8,9,16), Tiger Woods (3,4,5,9,11,12,16)

2. Top two finishers in the 2006 U.S. Amateur

John Kelly (a), Richie Ramsay (a)

3. Last five Masters Champions

Zach Johnson (9,11,12,16), Phil Mickelson (5,6,8,9,11,12,16), Mike Weir (8,16)

4. Last five British Open Champions

Ben Curtis (9), Todd Hamilton

5. Last five PGA Champions

Rich Beem, Shaun Micheel, Vijay Singh (8,9,11,12,16)

6. The Players Champion

7. The U.S. Senior Open Champion

Allen Doyle

8. Top 15 finishers and ties in the 2006 U.S. Open

Paul Casey (10,16), Luke Donald (9,10,11,16), Kenneth Ferrie, Pádraig Harrington (10,16), Ryuji Imada, Colin Montgomerie (10,16), Nick O'Hern (15,16), Ian Poulter (10,16), Jeff Sluman, Steve Stricker (16)

9. Top 30 leaders on the 2006 PGA Tour

Stephen Ames (16), Stuart Appleby (16), Chad Campbell (16), K. J. Choi (12,16), Stewart Cink (16), Joe Durant (16), Lucas Glover, J. J. Henry, Trevor Immelman (16), Davis Love III (16), Arron Oberholser (16), Rod Pampling (16), Tom Pernice Jr., Carl Pettersson (16), Brett Quigley, Rory Sabbatini (11,16), Adam Scott (11,12,16), David Toms (16), Brett Wetterich (16), Dean Wilson

10. Top 15 on the 2006 European Tour

Thomas Bjørn, Johan Edfors, Niclas Fasth (16), Sergio García (11,16), Robert Karlsson (16), Henrik Stenson (13,16), Anthony Wall

- David Howell (16) did not play.

11. Top 10 on the PGA Tour official money list, as of May 28

Charles Howell III (16), John Rollins (16)

12. Winners of multiple PGA Tour events from April 26, 2006, through June 3, 2007

13. Top 2 from the 2007 European Tour Order of Merit, as of May 28

14. Top 2 on the 2006 Japan Golf Tour, provided they are within the top 75 point leaders of the Official World Golf Rankings at that time

Shingo Katayama, Jeev Milkha Singh

15. Top 2 on the 2006 PGA Tour of Australasia, provided they are within the top 75 point leaders of the Official World Golf Rankings at that time

16. Top 50 on the Official World Golf Rankings list, as of May 28

Robert Allenby, Aaron Baddeley, Ángel Cabrera, Tim Clark, Chris DiMarco, Anders Hansen, José María Olazábal, Justin Rose, Charl Schwartzel, Vaughn Taylor, Scott Verplank, Lee Westwood

17. Special exemptions selected by the USGA

None

Sectional qualifiers

- Japan: Nobuhiro Masuda, Toru Taniguchi, Kaname Yokoo
- England: Christian Cévaër, Nick Dougherty, Darren Fichardt, Marcus Fraser, Peter Hanson, Søren Kjeldsen, Graeme McDowell, Miguel Rodríguez, Sam Walker
- United States

- Murrieta, California: Michael Block, Andrew Buckle, Richard T. Lee (a), Kevin Sutherland
- Columbine Valley, Colorado: Jason Allen
- Tequesta, Florida: Chris Condello (a), Jeff Golden (a)
- Ball Ground, Georgia: Jason Dufner, Mark Harrell (a), Lee Williams
- North Riverside, Illinois: Jeff Brehaut, Martin Laird, Andy Matthews, Jon Mills, Mike Small
- Mission Hills, Kansas: Michael Berg
- Rockville, Maryland: Rhys Davies (a), Fred Funk, Philip Pettitt Jr. (a), Joey Sindelar, Martin Ureta (a)
- Purchase, New York: Ricky Barnes, Frank Bensel, Geoffrey Sisk
- Columbus, Ohio: Woody Austin, Eric Axley, Joe Daley, Ken Duke, Todd Fischer, Harrison Frazar, Nathan Green, Craig Kanada, Jerry Kelly, Anthony Kim, John Koskinen, Trip Kuehne (a), Steve Marino, Pablo Martín, George McNeill, Ryan Moore, Sean O'Hair, Pat Perez, Warren Pineo, Michael Putnam, Camilo Villegas, Nick Watney, Bubba Watson, Boo Weekley
- Galena, Ohio: Kyle Dobbs, Tom Gillis, Jason Kokrak (a), Jacob Rogers
- Memphis, Tennessee: D. J. Brigman, Olin Browne, Tom Byrum, Steve Elkington, Bob Estes, Mathew Goggin, Paul Goydos, Tripp Isenhour, Tim Petrovic, Todd Rossetti, Brandt Snedeker, Adam Speirs, Darron Stiles, Chris Stroud, Kirk Triplett, Johnson Wagner
- Dallas, Texas: Justin Leonard, Hunter Mahan, Ryan Palmer
- Bremerton, Washington: Alex Prugh (a)

Alternates

- Luke List (Rockville) – replaced David Howell

== Course layout ==
Hole	1	2	3	4	5	6	7	8	9	Out	10	11	12	13	14	15	16	17	18	In	Total
Yards	482	341	428	609	382	194	479	288	477	3,680	435	379	667	183	358	500	231	313	484	3,550	7,230
Par	4	4	4	5	4	3	4	3	4	35	4	4	5	3	4	4	3	4	4	35	70

The 9th hole was previously played as a par 5; before 1962, the 1st hole was also played as a par 5.

Lengths of the course for previous major championships:

- 6,946 yards (6,351 m), par 71 - 1994 U.S. Open
- 6,972 yards (6,375 m), par 71 - 1983 U.S. Open
- 6,989 yards (6,391 m), par 71 - 1978 PGA Championship
- 6,921 yards (6,329 m), par 71 - 1973 U.S. Open
- 6,894 yards (6,304 m), par 71 - 1962 U.S. Open
- 6,916 yards (6,324 m), par 72 - 1953 U.S. Open
- 6,882 yards (6,293 m), par 72 - 1951 PGA Championship
- 6,981 yards (6,383 m), par 72 - 1935 U.S. Open
- 6,965 yards (6,369 m), par 72 - 1927 U.S. Open
- 6,707 yards (6,133 m), par 74 - 1922 PGA Championship

== Round summaries ==
=== First round ===
Thursday, June 14, 2007

In the difficult course conditions, only Nick Dougherty and Ángel Cabrera broke par during the first round. World number one Tiger Woods shot a 1-over 71, and #2 Phil Mickelson was at 74, playing with a wrist injury.

Place	Player	Score	To par
1	(England) Nick Dougherty	68	−2
2	(Argentina) Ángel Cabrera	69	−1
T3	(Spain) José María Olazábal	70	E
T3	(United States) Bubba Watson	70	E
T5	(United States) Olin Browne	71	+1
T5	(United States) Ben Curtis	71	+1
T5	(United States) Jason Dufner	71	+1
T5	(Sweden) Niclas Fasth	71	+1
T5	(United States) Fred Funk	71	+1
T5	(United States) Jim Furyk	71	+1
T5	(United States) Lucas Glover	71	+1
T5	(Denmark) Anders Hansen	71	+1
T5	(Sweden) Peter Hanson	71	+1
T5	(United States) J. J. Henry	71	+1
T5	(Spain) Pablo Martín	71	+1
T5	(Australia) Geoff Ogilvy	71	+1
T5	(England) Justin Rose	71	+1
T5	(Fiji) Vijay Singh	71	+1
T5	(United States) Brandt Snedeker	71	+1
T5	(United States) Tiger Woods	71	+1

=== Second round ===
Friday, June 15, 2007

Ángel Cabrera birdied the 477-yard (436 m) 9th hole (his 18th) after hitting an approach with a sand wedge to within two feet (0.6 m) to take a one-shot lead at the halfway point. The shot moved the cut line from +11 to +10, eliminating 19 players (including Phil Mickelson, who had had the longest current streak of making cuts at major championships at 30).

Paul Casey shot a 66 for the low round of the day when the average score was 76.933, the highest since the final round in 2004 at Shinnecock Hills. Stephen Ames' 69 was the only other score under par for the second round. The cut was at 150 (+10) and no amateurs advanced to the weekend.

Place	Player	Score	To par
1	(Argentina) Ángel Cabrera	69-71=140	E
2	(United States) Bubba Watson	70-71=141	+1
T3	(Canada) Stephen Ames	73-69=142	+2
T3	(Australia) Aaron Baddeley	72-70=142	+2
T3	(Sweden) Niclas Fasth	71-71=142	+2
T3	(England) Justin Rose	71-71=142	+2
7	(England) Paul Casey	77-66=143	+3
T8	(United States) Tom Pernice Jr.	72-72=144	+4
T8	(Sweden) Carl Pettersson	72-72=144	+4
T8	(United States) Brandt Snedeker	71-73=144	+4
T8	(United States) David Toms	72-72=144	+4
T8	(United States) Scott Verplank	73-71=144	+4

Amateurs: Harrell (+11), Ramsay (+12), Kokrak (+16), Davies (+17), Kelly (+18), Kuehne (+19), Golden (+20), Condello (+22), Pettitt Jr (+23), Prugh (+23), Ureta (+23), Lee (WD).

=== Third round ===
Saturday, June 16, 2007

Aaron Baddeley shot a second straight even-par round of 70, including a birdie on the 18th hole, to take a two-shot lead heading into the final round. Tiger Woods hit the first 17 greens in regulation en route to a 1-under 69, barely needing to work to save par until his only bogey on the last hole, and finished in second place two shots behind Baddeley. It was one of just two under-par rounds on the day (Steve Stricker shot a 68), and placed Woods in the final pairing on Sunday. To this point in his career, Woods had never won a major championship by coming from behind, which he would have had to do to win his third U.S. Open. Four players were one stroke behind Woods at 215 (+5).

Place	Player	Score	To par
1	(Australia) Aaron Baddeley	72-70-70=212	+2
2	(United States) Tiger Woods	71-74-69=214	+4
T3	(Canada) Stephen Ames	73-69-73=215	+5
T3	(England) Paul Casey	77-66-72=215	+5
T3	(England) Justin Rose	71-71-73=215	+5
T3	(United States) Bubba Watson	70-71-74=215	+5
T7	(Argentina) Ángel Cabrera	69-71-76=216	+6
T7	(United States) Jim Furyk	71-75-70=216	+6
T7	(United States) Steve Stricker	75-73-68=216	+6
T10	(Australia) Stuart Appleby	74-72-71=217	+7
T10	(Sweden) Niclas Fasth	71-71-75=217	+7
T10	(United States) David Toms	72-72-73=217	+7

=== Final round ===
Sunday, June 17, 2007

Ángel Cabrera shot a 1-under 69 to become the first Argentinian to win the U.S. Open. He entered the final round four shots behind, after shooting a disappointing 76 on Saturday. This gave him a 2:20 pm tee time on Sunday, 40 minutes ahead of the final pairing, which included Tiger Woods. After a birdie on the 15th hole, Cabrera was 3-under for the round, with a three stroke lead over Woods and a surging Jim Furyk.

After bogeys on the 16th and 17th holes that reduced his lead to one, Cabrera parred the difficult 18th hole and then had to wait in the clubhouse for Furyk and Woods to finish. Furyk tied for the lead with 3 straight birdies from 13-15 but bogeyed 17 to fall 1 stroke behind. Both Furyk and Woods needed to birdie the 72nd hole to force a Monday playoff but neither did, giving Cabrera the victory by a single stroke. Cabrera and Anthony Kim (67) were the only players to post sub-par scores during the final round. Aaron Baddeley was the 54-hole leader, but opened with a triple bogey and shot 80 (+10). The field broke par for only eight rounds during the tournament, just two players per day on the difficult Oakmont layout, and Cabrera was the only player to break par twice.

Place	Player	Score	To par	Money ($)
1	(Argentina) Ángel Cabrera	69-71-76-69=285	+5	1,260,000
T2	(United States) Jim Furyk	71-75-70-70=286	+6	611,336
T2	(United States) Tiger Woods	71-74-69-72=286	+6	611,336
4	(Sweden) Niclas Fasth	71-71-75-70=287	+7	325,923
T5	(United States) David Toms	72-72-73-72=289	+9	248,948
T5	(United States) Bubba Watson	70-71-74-74=289	+9	248,948
T7	(England) Nick Dougherty	68-77-74-71=290	+10	194,245
T7	(United States) Jerry Kelly	74-71-73-72=290	+10	194,245
T7	(United States) Scott Verplank	73-71-74-72=290	+10	194,245
T10	(Canada) Stephen Ames	73-69-73-76=291	+11	154,093
T10	(England) Paul Casey	77-66-72-76=291	+11	154,093
T10	(England) Justin Rose	71-71-73-76=291	+11	154,093

Full final leaderboard
The top eight finishers at the U.S. Open were automatically invited to the 2008 Masters and the top fifteen automatically qualified for the 2008 U.S. Open at Torrey Pines.

==== Scorecard ====
Final round

Hole	1	2	3	4	5	6	7	8	9	10	11	12	13	14	15	16	17	18
Par	4	4	4	5	4	3	4	3	4	4	4	5	3	4	4	3	4	4
(Argentina) Cabrera	+6	+6	+6	+5	+4	+5	+5	+4	+5	+5	+4	+4	+4	+4	+3	+4	+5	+5
(United States) Furyk	+6	+7	+7	+7	+7	+6	+6	+6	+6	+6	+7	+8	+7	+6	+5	+5	+6	+6
(United States) Woods	+4	+4	+6	+5	+5	+5	+5	+5	+5	+5	+6	+6	+6	+6	+6	+6	+6	+6
(Sweden) Fasth	+7	+6	+6	+6	+6	+6	+7	+8	+9	+9	+9	+9	+9	+8	+8	+8	+8	+7
(United States) Toms	+8	+8	+9	+9	+9	+9	+9	+10	+10	+10	+10	+10	+9	+9	+9	+9	+8	+9
(United States) Watson	+7	+7	+8	+8	+8	+8	+8	+8	+8	+8	+8	+8	+9	+8	+8	+7	+8	+9
(England) Dougherty	+9	+9	+10	+9	+8	+9	+9	+9	+9	+9	+9	+9	+9	+9	+9	+10	+10	+10
(United States) Kelly	+8	+7	+8	+8	+8	+9	+9	+9	+9	+9	+9	+9	+9	+9	+10	+10	+10	+10
(United States) Verplank	+8	+8	+8	+8	+7	+7	+8	+8	+8	+9	+9	+9	+9	+8	+8	+9	+9	+10
(Canada) Ames	+4	+4	+4	+4	+4	+5	+8	+8	+10	+9	+10	+10	+10	+9	+10	+10	+10	+11
(England) Casey	+5	+5	+6	+6	+7	+10	+11	+12	+13	+13	+13	+13	+13	+12	+13	+13	+12	+11
(England) Rose	+6	+5	+7	+6	+6	+6	+6	+7	+7	+8	+9	+9	+10	+10	+10	+10	+10	+11
(Australia) Baddeley	+5	+5	+5	+5	+5	+5	+7	+8	+8	+9	+10	+10	+10	+10	+11	+11	+11	+12

Cumulative tournament scores, relative to par

Birdie	Bogey	Double bogey	Triple bogey+

== See also ==
- United States Golf Association
