= 1994 U.S. Open (golf) =

Tournament information
- Dates: June 16–20, 1994
- Location: Oakmont, Pennsylvania; 40.526°N 79.827°W
- Course: Oakmont Country Club
- Tour: PGA Tour

Statistics
- Par: 71
- Length: 6,946 yards (6,351 m)
- Field: 159 players, 65 after cut
- Cut: 147 (+5)
- Prize fund: $1.7 million
- Winner's share: $320,000

Champion
- (South Africa) Ernie Els
- 279 (−5), playoff

Location map
- Location in the United States Location in Pennsylvania

The 1994 U.S. Open was the 94th U.S. Open, held June 16–20 at Oakmont Country Club in Oakmont, Pennsylvania, a suburb northeast of Pittsburgh. Ernie Els, age 24, won the first of his four major titles on the second sudden-death hole to defeat Loren Roberts, after Colin Montgomerie was eliminated in an 18-hole playoff. (Both Roberts and Montgomerie were winless in major championships, but each won several senior majors while on the Champions Tour.) It was the seventh U.S. Open and tenth major held at Oakmont, and was Arnold Palmer's final U.S. Open as a participant.

== Palmer's last ==
Palmer, age 64, played in his final U.S. Open in 1994. He had not played in the tournament in eleven years, since it was last at Oakmont in 1983, but received an exemption by the USGA to play in his home state. As an amateur, his first U.S. Open in 1953 was also played at Oakmont, won by Ben Hogan.

== Television ==
This was the last U.S. Open for ABC Sports, which had televised the U.S. Open in the United States since 1966, 29 consecutive years. NBC Sports televised the event for twenty years, from 1995 through 2014. Starting in 2015, Fox Sports began a 12-year contract to televise the championship and other USGA events. NBC regained the rights to the U.S. Open in 2020 after taking over Fox's contract.

== Course layout ==
Hole	1	2	3	4	5	6	7	8	9	Out	10	11	12	13	14	15	16	17	18	In	Total
Yards	463	342	421	560	378	195	431	249	474	3,513	458	378	598	181	356	467	228	315	452	3,433	6,946
Par	4	4	4	5	4	3	4	3	5	36	4	4	5	3	4	4	3	4	4	35	71

Lengths of the course for previous major championships:

- 6,972 yards (6,375 m), par 71 - 1983 U.S. Open
- 6,989 yards (6,391 m), par 71 - 1978 PGA Championship
- 6,921 yards (6,329 m), par 71 - 1973 U.S. Open
- 6,894 yards (6,304 m), par 71 - 1962 U.S. Open
  Before 1962, the 1st hole was played as a par 5.
- 6,916 yards (6,324 m), par 72 - 1953 U.S. Open
- 6,882 yards (6,293 m), par 72 - 1951 PGA Championship
- 6,981 yards (6,383 m), par 72 - 1935 U.S. Open
- 6,965 yards (6,369 m), par 72 - 1927 U.S. Open
- 6,707 yards (6,133 m), par 74 - 1922 PGA Championship

== Round summaries ==
=== First round ===
Thursday, June 16, 1994

Place	Player	Score	To par
1	(United States) Tom Watson	68	−3
T2	(South Africa) Ernie Els	69	−2
T2	(United States) Hale Irwin	69	−2
T2	(United States) Jack Nicklaus	69	−2
T2	(New Zealand) Frank Nobilo	69	−2
T6	(Japan) Masashi Ozaki	70	−1
T6	(United States) Curtis Strange	70	−1
T6	(United States) Kirk Triplett	70	−1
T6	(United States) Scott Verplank	70	−1
T10	(United States) Mark Calcavecchia	71	E
T10	(United States) Ben Crenshaw	71	E
T10	(United States) Clark Dennis	71	E
T10	(Australia) Bradley Hughes	71	E
T10	(United States) Steve Lowery	71	E
T10	(United States) Jeff Maggert	71	E
T10	(Japan) Hajime Meshiai	71	E
T10	(Scotland) Colin Montgomerie	71	E
T10	(Australia) Greg Norman	71	E
T10	(United States) Dave Rummells	71	E
T10	(United States) Jim Thorpe	71	E
T10	(United States) Don Walsworth	71	E
T10	(United States) Mark Wurtz	71	E

=== Second round ===
Friday, June 17, 1994

Place	Player	Score	To par
1	(Scotland) Colin Montgomerie	71-65=136	−6
T2	(United States) John Cook	73-65=138	−4
T2	(United States) David Edwards	73-65=138	−4
T2	(United States) Hale Irwin	69-69=138	−4
T5	(United States) Jeff Maggert	71-68=139	−3
T5	(United States) Jack Nicklaus	69-70=139	−3
T7	(South Africa) Ernie Els	69-71=140	−2
T7	(New Zealand) Frank Nobilo	69-71=140	−2
T7	(United States) Steve Pate	74-66=140	−2
T7	(United States) Curtis Strange	70-70=140	−2

Amateurs: Alexander (+7).

=== Third round ===
Saturday, June 18, 1994

Place	Player	Score	To par
1	(South Africa) Ernie Els	69-71-66=206	−7
2	(New Zealand) Frank Nobilo	69-71-68=208	−5
T3	(United States) Hale Irwin	69-69-71=209	−4
T3	(Scotland) Colin Montgomerie	71-65-73=209	−4
T3	(United States) Loren Roberts	76-69-64=209	−4
T3	(United States) Tom Watson	68-73-68=209	−4
T7	(United States) Steve Lowery	71-71-68=210	−3
T7	(United States) Curtis Strange	70-70-70=210	−3
T9	(United States) John Cook	73-65-73=211	−2
T9	(Australia) Greg Norman	71-71-69=211	−2
T9	(United States) Steve Pate	74-66-71=211	−2

=== Final round ===
Sunday, June 19, 1994

Els shot a 66 (−5) in the third round to take a two-shot lead. At the start of the Sunday's final round, Els was the beneficiary of a controversial ruling. After he hit his opening drive into deep rough, a tournament official ruled that a broadcast truck and aerial camera was in his line of play. He was allowed to take a drop in a spot where escape was much more likely, but still ended up with a bogey on the hole. Afterwards, some pundits suggested that the ruling was wrong and Els should have been forced to play from his original location, since it was possible to move the aerial camera out of the way. Roberts and Montgomerie both recorded a 70 (−1) in the round to challenge Els. Roberts could have posted a −6 (278) clubhouse score, but he missed a par putt on the 18th. Strange was in contention most of the day, but made bogeys on 15 and 16 and a birdie on 18 left him at −4 (280). Els needed par on the last to hold off Roberts and Montgomerie, but he hit his drive into the rough and made bogey from there, forcing a three-way playoff. It was the first three-way playoff at the U.S. Open in 31 years, when Julius Boros defeated Jacky Cupit and Palmer in 1963.

Place	Player	Score	To par	Money ($)
T1	(South Africa) Ernie Els	69-71-66-73=279	−5	Playoff
T1	(Scotland) Colin Montgomerie	71-65-73-70=279	−5	Playoff
T1	(United States) Loren Roberts	76-69-64-70=279	−5	Playoff
4	(United States) Curtis Strange	70-70-70-70=280	−4	75,728
5	(United States) John Cook	73-65-73-71=282	−2	61,318
T6	(United States) Clark Dennis	71-71-70-71=283	−1	49,485
T6	(Australia) Greg Norman	71-71-69-72=283	−1	49,485
T6	(United States) Tom Watson	68-73-68-74=283	−1	49,485
T9	(United States) Jeff Maggert	71-68-75-70=284	E	37,179
T9	(New Zealand) Frank Nobilo	69-71-68-76=284	E	37,179
T9	(United States) Jeff Sluman	72-69-72-71=284	E	37,179
T9	(United States) Duffy Waldorf	74-68-73-69=284	E	37,179

==== Scorecard ====
Final round

Hole	1	2	3	4	5	6	7	8	9	10	11	12	13	14	15	16	17	18
Par	4	4	4	5	4	3	4	3	5	4	4	5	3	4	4	3	4	4
(South Africa) Els	−6	−6	−6	−7	−7	−7	−7	−6	−6	−7	−6	−6	−6	−6	−7	−6	−6	−5
(Scotland) Montgomerie	−4	−4	−4	−5	−5	−5	−6	−6	−7	−7	−6	−5	−4	−5	−4	−4	−5	−5
(United States) Roberts	−4	−4	−4	−4	−4	−4	−4	−5	−6	−5	−6	−6	−7	−7	−6	−6	−6	−5
(United States) Strange	−3	−3	−4	−5	−6	−6	−6	−5	−5	−4	−5	−5	−4	−5	−4	−3	−3	−4
(United States) Cook	−2	−3	−3	−3	−3	−3	−3	−2	−1	E	E	E	E	−1	−1	−1	−2	−2
(New Zealand) Nobilo	−5	−4	−2	−3	−4	−4	−4	−4	−4	−3	−2	−1	−1	−1	E	E	E	E

Cumulative tournament scores, relative to par

Birdie	Bogey	Double bogey

=== Playoff ===
Monday, June 20, 1994

All three players struggled early in the Monday playoff. Montgomerie double-bogeyed the 2nd, 3rd, and 11th holes and fell out of contention. Els began the playoff bogey-triple bogey, while Roberts double-bogeyed the 5th. Roberts had a one-stroke lead over Els on the 16th, but he bogeyed the hole to fall into a tie. Els and Roberts both carded a 74 (+3), while Montgomerie finished with a 78 (+7) and was eliminated.

After halving the first extra hole with pars, they headed to the 11th where Roberts found a greenside bunker on his approach while Els safely hit the green. After Roberts' par putt lipped out, Els two-putted for par and the championship. It was the second time for sudden-death at the U.S. Open, which was first implemented in 1990. It was needed again in 2008.

Place	Player	Score	To par	Sudden death	Money ($)
1	(South Africa) Ernie Els	74	+3	4–4	320,000
T2	(United States) Loren Roberts	74	+3	4–5	141,827
T2	(Scotland) Colin Montgomerie	78	+7	—N/a	141,827

- Els and Roberts were tied at 74 (+3) after 18 holes; Montgomerie was four strokes back and was eliminated.
- The sudden-death playoff began on the back nine and Els (4-4) defeated Roberts (4-5) on the second hole.

==== Scorecard ====
Hole	1	2	3	4	5	6	7	8	9	10	11	12	13	14	15	16	17	18
Par	4	4	4	5	4	3	4	3	5	4	4	5	3	4	4	3	4	4
(South Africa) Els	+1	+4	+3	+3	+3	+3	+2	+3	+2	+3	+3	+4	+4	+4	+4	+4	+3	+3
(United States) Roberts	E	+1	+1	+1	+3	+2	+2	+3	+2	+3	+3	+3	+3	+3	+3	+4	+3	+3
(Scotland) Montgomerie	E	+2	+4	+4	+4	+5	+5	+6	+6	+6	+8	+8	+7	+7	+7	+7	+7	+7
Sudden-death playoff
(South Africa) Els										E	E							
(United States) Roberts										E	+1							

Cumulative playoff scores, relative to par

Birdie	Bogey	Double bogey	Triple bogey+
