= 1983 U.S. Open (golf) =

Tournament information
- Dates: June 16–20, 1983
- Location: Oakmont, Pennsylvania; 40.526°N 79.827°W
- Course: Oakmont Country Club
- Tour: PGA Tour

Statistics
- Par: 71
- Length: 6,972 yards (6,375 m)
- Field: 155 players, 71 after cut
- Cut: 151 (+9)
- Prize fund: $500,000
- Winner's share: $72,000

Champion
- (United States) Larry Nelson
- 280 (−4)

Location map
- Location in the United States Location in Pennsylvania

The 1983 U.S. Open was the 83rd U.S. Open, held June 16–20 at Oakmont Country Club in Oakmont, Pennsylvania, a suburb northeast of Pittsburgh. Larry Nelson won the second of his three major titles, and only U.S. Open, one stroke ahead of defending champion Tom Watson.

Watson and Seve Ballesteros shared the 54-hole lead, with Nelson a stroke back. Nelson was 7-over for the championship after four holes in his third round, but then played the final fourteen holes on Saturday in 7-under to get to even-par 213, one shot behind the co-leaders. Watson was attempting to become the first to successfully defend a U.S. Open title in over thirty years, last achieved by Ben Hogan in 1951.

In the final round, Watson opened with a front-nine 31 to open up a three-stroke lead over Nelson, who shot 33. Nelson tied Watson with a birdie at 14 after Watson had bogeyed 10 and 12. A storm came through Oakmont around 5:30 p.m., which postponed play to the following morning. Watson was on the 14th green, Nelson on the 16th tee, tied at four-under for the championship.

On Monday morning, Nelson holed a 62-foot (19 m) birdie putt at the par-3 16th, but then three-putted at the 18th for bogey. Nelson finished at four-under 280 total and waited for Watson. After he failed to save a par from a bunker at the 17th, Watson was one stroke behind Nelson. Watson needed a birdie at 18 to tie but his approach flew over the green. Nelson became the winner when Watson failed to hole out his chip shot.

Nelson established a new tournament record with 132 strokes over the last 36 holes, breaking Gene Sarazen's 51-year-old mark. It was the second consecutive runner-up finish at Oakmont for Watson, who lost a sudden-death playoff to John Mahaffey five years earlier at the PGA Championship in 1978.

Arnold Palmer made his last cut in a U.S. Open here and tied for 60th place. He played the Open just once more, in 1994 when he was granted a special exemption when it returned to Oakmont. Future major champion Paul Azinger made his major championship debut but missed the cut. Johnny Miller, the champion when the Open was last played at Oakmont in 1973, battled health issues, and also missed the cut.

This was the sixth U.S. Open at Oakmont, and ninth major championship. Ticket prices were $24 per day, cash only; practice days were $14.

== Course layout ==
Hole	1	2	3	4	5	6	7	8	9	Out	10	11	12	13	14	15	16	17	18	In	Total
Yards	469	343	425	561	379	201	434	240	480	3,532	462	371	603	185	360	453	228	322	456	3,440	6,972
Par	4	4	4	5	4	3	4	3	5	36	4	4	5	3	4	4	3	4	4	35	71

Lengths of the course for previous major championships:

- 6,989 yards (6,391 m), par 71 - 1978 PGA Championship
- 6,921 yards (6,329 m), par 71 - 1973 U.S. Open
- 6,894 yards (6,304 m), par 71 - 1962 U.S. Open
- 6,916 yards (6,324 m), par 72 - 1953 U.S. Open
- 6,882 yards (6,293 m), par 72 - 1951 PGA Championship
- 6,981 yards (6,383 m), par 72 - 1935 U.S. Open
- 6,965 yards (6,369 m), par 72 - 1927 U.S. Open
- 6,707 yards (6,133 m), par 74 - 1922 PGA Championship

Before 1962, the first hole was played as a par 5.

== Round summaries ==
=== First round ===
Thursday, June 16, 1983

Place	Player	Score	To par
T1	(Spain) Seve Ballesteros	69	−2
T1	(United States) John Mahaffey	69	−2
T1	(United States) Bob Murphy	69	−2
4	(Australia) Bruce Devlin	70	−1
T5	(United States) Lou Graham	71	E
T5	(United States) Bobby Wadkins	71	E
T5	(United States) D. A. Weibring	71	E
T8	(United States) Jim Booros	72	+1
T8	(United States) Frank Conner	72	+1
T8	(United States) Raymond Floyd	72	+1
T8	(United States) Hale Irwin	72	+1
T8	(Canada) Jim Nelford	72	+1
T8	(Zimbabwe) Nick Price	72	+1
T8	(United States) Joey Rassett	72	+1
T8	(United States) Lanny Wadkins	72	+1
T8	(United States) Tom Watson	72	+1

=== Second round ===
Friday, June 17, 1983
Saturday, June 18, 1983

Place	Player	Score	To par
T1	(United States) John Mahaffey	69-72=141	−1
T1	(United States) Joey Rassett	72-69=141	−1
T3	(United States) Raymond Floyd	72-70=142	E
T3	(United States) Tom Watson	72-70=142	E
T5	(Spain) Seve Ballesteros	69-74=143	+1
T5	(United States) Calvin Peete	75-68=143	+1
T5	(United States) Hal Sutton	73-70=143	+1
T8	(United States) Andy North	73-71=144	+2
T8	(United States) David Ogrin	75-69=144	+2
T8	(United States) Scott Simpson	73-71=144	+2

Amateurs: Faxon (+8), Sherman (+9), Sigel (+13), Lewis (+15), Rinker (+15), Moise (+18), McNamara (+19), Taylor (+21), Farlow (+23).

=== Third round ===
Saturday, June 18, 1983

Place	Player	Score	To par
T1	(Spain) Seve Ballesteros	69-74-69=212	−1
T1	(United States) Tom Watson	72-70-70=212	−1
T3	(United States) Larry Nelson	75-73-65=213	E
T3	(United States) Calvin Peete	75-68-70=213	E
5	(United States) Raymond Floyd	72-70-72=214	+1
6	(United States) Gil Morgan	73-72-70=215	+2
T7	(United States) Andy North	73-71-72=216	+3
T7	(United States) Hal Sutton	73-70-73=216	+3
T9	(United States) Ralph Landrum	75-73-69=217	+4
T9	(United States) Roger Maltbie	76-72-69=217	+4
T9	(United States) Scott Simpson	73-71-73=217	+4

=== Final round ===
Sunday, June 19, 1983
Monday, June 20, 1983

Place	Player	Score	To par	Money ($)
1	(United States) Larry Nelson	75-73-65-67=280	−4	72,000
2	(United States) Tom Watson	72-70-70-69=281	−3	44,000
3	(United States) Gil Morgan	73-72-70-68=283	−1	29,000
T4	(Spain) Seve Ballesteros	69-74-69-74=286	+2	17,968
T4	(United States) Calvin Peete	75-68-70-73=286	+2	17,968
6	(United States) Hal Sutton	73-70-73-71=287	+3	13,254
7	(United States) Lanny Wadkins	72-73-74-69=288	+4	12,088
T8	(Australia) David Graham	74-75-73-69=291	+7	10,711
T8	(United States) Ralph Landrum	75-73-69-74=291	+7	10,711
T10	(United States) Chip Beck	73-74-74-71=292	+8	8,976
T10	(United States) Andy North	73-71-72-76=292	+8	8,976
T10	(United States) Craig Stadler	76-74-73-69=292	+8	8,976

Amateurs: Brad Faxon (+18), Sherman (+20).

==== Scorecard ====
Final round

Hole	1	2	3	4	5	6	7	8	9	10	11	12	13	14	15	16	17	18
Par	4	4	4	5	4	3	4	3	5	4	4	5	3	4	4	3	4	4
(United States) Nelson	E	E	−1	−1	−1	−2	−3	−2	−3	−3	−3	−3	−3	−4	−4	−5	−5	−4
(United States) Watson	−1	−2	−3	−4	−4	−5	−4	−5	−6	−5	−5	−4	−4	−4	−4	−4	−3	−3
(United States) Morgan	+3	+3	+3	+3	+3	+3	+3	+3	+2	+2	+1	E	E	E	E	−1	−1	−1
(Spain) Ballesteros	−1	−1	−1	−2	−2	−2	−1	−1	−1	E	E	+1	+1	+1	+2	+3	+3	+2
(United States) Peete	+1	+2	+2	+2	+2	+2	+2	+1	+1	+1	+1	E	E	E	+1	+2	+2	+2
(United States) Sutton	+3	+3	+4	+3	+2	+2	+1	+2	+1	+3	+3	+4	+3	+2	+1	+2	+2	+3

Cumulative tournament scores, relative to par

Birdie	Bogey	Double bogey
