= Pittsburgh Field Club =

American private country club

Coordinates: 40°30′47″N 79°53′21″W

- Interactive map of Pittsburgh Field Club

Club information
- Location: Fox Chapel, Pennsylvania, U.S.
- Established: 1882
- Type: Private
- Tota holes: 18
- Tournaments: 1937 PGA Championship
- Website: fieldclub.org
- Designed by: Alexander H. Findlay
- Par: 71
- Length: 6,785 yards (6,204 m)
- Course rating: 73.5

The Pittsburgh Field Club is a private, American country club that was established in 1882. Located six miles (10 km) northeast of downtown Pittsburgh in the suburb of Fox Chapel, Pennsylvania, it is part of a quartet of courses in the suburbs northeast of Pittsburgh, along with the Longue Vue Club and Golf Course, Oakmont Country Club and the Seth Raynor-designed Fox Chapel Golf Club.

== History ==
Known simply as The Field Club to Pittsburghers, it hosted the PGA Championship in 1937, during which Denny Shute successfully defended his match play title. The club also hosted the Western Open in 1959 as part of Pittsburgh's bicentennial celebration.

Before he won the U.S. Open in 1953 at nearby Oakmont, Ben Hogan had to qualify for the national championship at the Pittsburgh Field Club, even though he had won three of the previous five.

The course was designed by Alexander H. Findlay in August 1914. At the time, Findlay was the premier golf course architect in the country, having perfected his design skills for decades in every corner of the country. The current layout is an amalgam that includes the efforts of Donald Ross, A.W. Tillinghast, Emil "Dutch" Loeffler, Arthur Hills, Craig Schreiner and Keith Foster in 2012.

The first tee next to the clubhouse sits high above the fairway; many members suggest aiming for the white steeple of Fox Chapel Presbyterian Church when teeing off there. A unique feature to the course layout is an elevator from the seventeenth green to the eighteenth tee box.

Amenities at the club include a skeet range, a swimming pool, tennis and paddleball courts, a privately stocked fishing lake, a driving range, a practice area, an eighteen-hole golf course, and a full-service restaurant.

The club has had several world renowned Head Professionals including Sam Sneads brother Pete Snead. David Martin served as the golf professional for thirty-nine years and retired in 2021.
