= 1978 PGA Championship =

Tournament information
- Dates: August 3–6, 1978
- Location: Oakmont, Pennsylvania; 40.526°N 79.827°W
- Course: Oakmont Country Club
- Organized by: PGA of America
- Tour: PGA Tour

Statistics
- Par: 71
- Length: 6,989 yards (6,391 m)
- Field: 149 players, 70 after cut
- Cut: 148 (+6)
- Prize fund: $300,240
- Winner's share: $50,000

Champion
- (United States) John Mahaffey
- 276 (−8), playoff
- Location in the United States Location in Pennsylvania

The 1978 PGA Championship was the 60th PGA Championship, played August 3–6 at Oakmont Country Club in Oakmont, Pennsylvania, a suburb northeast of Pittsburgh. John Mahaffey won his only major championship in a sudden-death playoff over Jerry Pate and Tom Watson.

Watson led the tournament each day and held a five-shot lead after 54 holes, but he faltered on Sunday with a 73 (+2) in his best opportunity for a PGA Championship, the only major he has never won. Pate had a four-foot (1.3 m) putt for a par and the victory on the 72nd hole, but it lipped out. After opening with a four-over 75 on Thursday, Mahaffey rebounded to go 12-under for the next three rounds, including a five-under 66 in the final round to gain the seven strokes on Watson. He had a history of hard luck in majors: at the U.S. Open, he lost the 18-hole playoff in 1975 and was the 54-hole leader in 1976, won by tour rookie Pate. Mahaffey broke that streak when he birdied the second extra hole to win the playoff at Oakmont. It was the second of three consecutive playoffs at the PGA Championship.

Like Arnold Palmer, Watson won numerous majors but never the PGA Championship, the only leg missing for a career grand slam. At this time he had won three of his eight majors; his next best finish at the PGA Championship came fifteen years later in 1993, placing fifth at Inverness. Pate finished in the top five for the third straight year (and would again the next year) but never won another major.

Jack Nicklaus, age 38, shot a 79 in the first round and missed the cut by five strokes in one of his worst performances in a major. It was his only missed cut in a major the entire 1970s decade. Four-time champion Nicklaus was a pre-tournament favorite: in his previous majors at Oakmont (two U.S. Opens), he won in 1962, his first major and first win as a professional, and tied for fourth in 1973. At the previous year's PGA Championship at Pebble Beach, he finished third, one stroke out of the playoff.

This was the eighth major held at Oakmont and its third PGA Championship; the previous two in 1922 and 1951 were match play events.

== Course layout ==
Hole	1	2	3	4	5	6	7	8	9	Out	10	11	12	13	14	15	16	17	18	In	Total
Yards	469	343	425	561	379	201	434	255	480	3,547	462	371	603	185	360	453	230	322	456	3,442	6,989
Par	4	4	4	5	4	3	4	3	5	36	4	4	5	3	4	4	3	4	4	35	71

Lengths of the course for previous major championships:

- 6,921 yards (6,329 m), par 71 - 1973 U.S. Open
- 6,894 yards (6,304 m), par 71 - 1962 U.S. Open
- 6,916 yards (6,324 m), par 72 - 1953 U.S. Open
- 6,882 yards (6,293 m), par 72 - 1951 PGA Championship
- 6,981 yards (6,383 m), par 72 - 1935 U.S. Open
- 6,965 yards (6,369 m), par 72 - 1927 U.S. Open
- 6,707 yards (6,133 m), par 74 - 1922 PGA Championship

Before 1962, the 1st hole was played as a par 5.

== Round summaries ==
=== First round ===
Thursday, August 3, 1978

Place	Player	Score	To par
1	(United States) Tom Watson	67	−4
2	(United States) Dave Stockton	68	−3
T3	(United States) Dave Hill	69	−2
T3	(United States) Ben Crenshaw	69	−2
T3	(United States) Johnny Miller	69	−2
T3	(United States) Lee Trevino	69	−2
T7	(United States) Grier Jones	70	−1
T7	(United States) Phil Hancock	70	−1
T7	(United States) Lanny Wadkins	70	−1
T7	(United States) Mike Sullivan	70	−1
T7	(United States) Mike Morley	70	−1
T7	(United States) Billy Kratzert	70	−1
T7	(United States) Jerry McGee	70	−1
T7	(United States) Rod Funseth	70	−1
T7	(United States) Craig Stadler	70	−1

=== Second round ===
Friday, August 4, 1978

Place	Player	Score	To par
1	(United States) Tom Watson	67-69=136	−6
T2	(United States) Tom Weiskopf	73-67=140	−2
T2	(United States) Joe Inman	72-68=140	−2
T2	(United States) Ben Crenshaw	69-71=140	−2
5	(United States) Johnny Miller	69-72=141	−1
T6	(United States) John Mahaffey	75-67=142	E
T6	(United States) Bobby Nichols	75-67=142	E
T6	(United States) Bob Zender	73-69=142	E
T6	(United States) Jerry Pate	72-70=142	E
T6	(United States) Tom Purtzer	72-70=142	E
T6	(United States) Hubert Green	71-71=142	E
T6	(United States) Lee Trevino	69-73=142	E

=== Third round ===
Saturday, August 5, 1978

Place	Player	Score	To par
1	(United States) Tom Watson	67-69-67=203	−10
2	(United States) Jerry Pate	72-70-66=208	−5
T3	(United States) Joe Inman	72-68-69=209	−4
T3	(United States) Tom Weiskopf	73-67-69=209	−4
5	(United States) John Mahaffey	75-67-68=210	−3
6	(United States) Craig Stadler	70-74-67=211	−2
7	(United States) Lee Trevino	69-73-70=212	−1
T8	(United States) Gil Morgan	76-71-66=213	E
T8	(United States) Kermit Zarley	75-71-67=213	E
T8	(United States) Phil Hancock	70-73-70=213	E
T8	(United States) Johnny Miller	69-72-72=213	E

=== Final round ===
Sunday, August 6, 1978

Place	Player	Score	To par	Money ($)
T1	(United States) John Mahaffey	75-67-68-66=276	−8	Playoff
T1	(United States) Jerry Pate	72-70-66-68=276	−8	Playoff
T1	(United States) Tom Watson	67-69-67-73=276	−8	Playoff
T4	(United States) Gil Morgan	76-71-66-67=280	−4	14,500
T4	(United States) Tom Weiskopf	73-67-69-71=280	−4	14,500
6	(United States) Craig Stadler	70-74-67-71=282	-2	10,000
T7	(United States) Andy Bean	72-72-70-70=284	E	8,000
T7	(Australia) Graham Marsh	72-74-68-70=284	E	8,000
T7	(United States) Lee Trevino	69-73-70-72=284	E	8,000
10	(United States) Fuzzy Zoeller	75-69-73-68=285	+1	6,500

=== Playoff ===
The sudden death playoff began on the front nine at hole #1, a par-4 which all three parred.
After Watson and Pate could not birdie hole #2, Mahaffey sunk a 12-foot (3.7 m) birdie putt to win the title.

Place	Player	Score	To par	Money ($)
1	(United States) John Mahaffey	4-3	−1	50,000
T2	(United States) Jerry Pate	4-x	E	25,000
T2	(United States) Tom Watson	4-x	E	25,000
