= 1983 U.S. Open =

1983 U.S. Open may refer to:

- 1983 U.S. Open (golf), a major golf tournament
- 1983 US Open (tennis), a Grand Slam tennis tournament
