= 1994 U.S. Open =

1994 U.S. Open may refer to:

- 1994 U.S. Open (golf), a major golf tournament
- 1994 US Open (tennis), a Grand Slam tennis tournament
