= Frank Souchak =

American football player and golfer (1915–2006)

Personal information
- Full name: Frank S. Souchak, Jr.
- Nationality: United States
- Born: April 30, 1915 Berwick, Pennsylvania, U.S.
- Died: February 7, 2006 (aged 90) Pebble Beach, California, U.S.

Career
- Sport: Golf
- College: University of Pittsburgh
- Status: Amateur

Best results in major championships
- Masters Tournament: WD: 1954
- PGA Championship: DNP
- U.S. Open: T9: 1953
- The Open Championship: DNP

Frank S. Souchak, Jr. (April 30, 1915 – February 7, 2006) was an American professional football player and amateur golfer.

== Career ==
Souchak was born in Berwick, Pennsylvania. He attended the University of Pittsburgh where he lettered in basketball, football, and golf. In 1937, he was captain of the football team and earned All-American honors. He played in the 1938 East–West Shrine Game. He was drafted by the New York Giants in the 1938 NFL draft but played for the Pittsburgh Pirates (Steelers) in 1939. He also was an assistant coach for the Steelers in 1946.

Souchak was also an amateur golfer who won several amateur tournaments, particularly in western Pennsylvania. His biggest moment came in the 1953 U.S. Open at Oakmont Country Club outside of Pittsburgh, Pennsylvania. He was a member of Oakmont and shot a first round 70 which put him in a tie for second place with George Fazio and Walter Burkemo, three strokes behind eventual champion Ben Hogan. Souchak ended the tournament in a tie for 9th place and was the low amateur. His younger brother, Mike Souchak, was a professional golfer won 15 times on the PGA Tour. The brothers won the team portion of the 1967 Bing Crosby National Pro-Am.

Souchak died in Pebble Beach, California where he had lived for 37 years.

== Amateur wins ==
this list may be incomplete

- 1946 Western Pennsylvania Amateur
- 1947 West Penn Four Ball (with Jim Marks, Jr.)
- 1948 West Penn Four Ball (with Jim Marks, Jr.)
- 1951 West Penn Four Ball (with Hudson Samson, Jr.)
- 1952 West Penn Four Ball (with Hudson Samson, Jr.)
- 1967 Bing Crosby National Pro-Am (team with Mike Souchak)
