= Frank Sprogell =

American golfer (1895–1978)

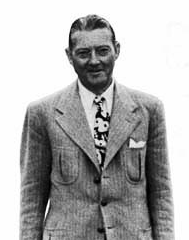
- Sprogell, c. 1941

Personal information
- Full name: Francis Thomas Sprogell
- Nickname: Frank
- Nationality: United States
- Born: November 28, 1895 Philadelphia, Pennsylvania, U.S.
- Died: July 31, 1978 (aged 82) Dunedin, Florida, U.S.
- Spouse: Helen Donnelly Sprogell
- Children: 3

Career
- Sport: Golf
- Turned professional: c. 1912
- Former tour: PGA Tour
- Professional wins: 2

Best results in major championships
- Masters Tournament: DNP
- PGA Championship: T9: 1922
- U.S. Open: T43: 1926
- The Open Championship: DNP

Achievements and awards
- Michigan PGA Section Hall of Fame: 2015

Francis Thomas Sprogell, Sr. (November 28, 1895 – July 31, 1978) was an American professional golfer who played in the early-to-mid 20th century. His best finish in a major championship was a tie for ninth place in the 1922 PGA Championship. He won the 1921 Tennessee Open and the 1925 Michigan PGA Championship.

Sprogell designed and built at least five golf courses in Michigan. In 2015 he was inducted into the Michigan PGA Section Hall of Fame. Sprogell died in Florida in 1978.

== Early life and marriage ==
Sprogell was born in Philadelphia, Pennsylvania, on November 28, 1895, the son of Orrin Aloysius Sprogell (1867–1956) and Elizabeth Kelly (1871–1943). His formative years were spent in the west Philadelphia area where he lived on the same block with John McDermott and Morrie Talman. The boys were first introduced to golf when they worked as caddies at the Aronimink Golf Club. Around 1915, he was married to Helen Donnelly. The couple had three children: sons Donald and Frank, Jr. and a daughter, Dorothy.

== Golf career ==
Sprogell, who was described by golf writer Eddie Ervis as being "tall and ram-rod straight", worked at a number of different clubs during his career including Pocono Pines Golf Club, Philmont Country Club, Bon Air Country Club, and Llanerch Country Club where he was posted during the 1915 and 1916 seasons.

In 1921, he beat Bobby Jones in an exhibition match by the score of 69 to 71, but Sprogell modestly said, "that was before Bobby hit his stride". He was elected as the secretary of the PGA of America in December 1941 and remained in that post until 1946. He was also president of the Michigan PGA Section for eight years. In 1957 he became the head professional and general manager of the Dunedin Country Club in Dunedin, Florida. Sprogell also spent a number of years working in Alabama where his daughter Dorothy was born.

=== Sprogell on golf ===
In 1959, Sprogell said, "being a golf pro is not really a job. It seems apart from working people. After all these years I still get a thrill when I turn the key to unlock the door to my pro shop because I know that today I'll talk more golf, meet new people, and teach someone something about golf".

=== 1922 PGA Championship ===
The 1922 PGA Championship was the fifth PGA Championship, held August 14–18 at Oakmont Country Club in Oakmont, Pennsylvania, a suburb northeast of Pittsburgh. The match play field of 64 competitors qualified by sectional tournaments. This was the first PGA Championship with a field of 64 in the bracket; the previous four had fields of 32 players. In the Friday final, Gene Sarazen defeated Emmet French 4 and 3.

Sprogell started off in a first round match in good form, defeating Willie Hunter 3 and 1. He continued to play well in a second round match in which he beat Dan Kenny 4 and 3. His luck ran out in a third round match against Gene Sarazen – the eventual winner of the tournament – and he was beaten by the score of 9 and 7 in 36 holes of match play. He finished T9 for the tournament.

== Death and legacy ==
Sprogell died on July 31, 1978, in Dunedin, Florida. His wife Helen preceded him in death in 1976. In 2015 he was inducted into the Michigan PGA Section Hall of Fame.

== Professional wins (2) ==
- 1921 Tennessee Open
- 1925 Michigan PGA Championship

== Results in major championships ==
Tournament	1920	1921	1922	1923	1924	1925	1926
U.S. Open	T59	?	T63	?	52	?	T43
PGA Championship	DNP	DNP	R16	DNP	DNP	DNP	DNP

Note: Sprogell never played in the Masters Tournament or The Open Championship.

? = Unknown
"T" = Tied for a place
DNP = Did not play
R64, R32, R16, QF, SF = Round in which player lost in PGA Championship match play
Yellow background for top-10
