= Stimpmeter =

Golf putting green measurement device

The Stimpmeter is a device used to measure the speed of a golf course putting green by applying a known velocity to a golf ball and measuring the distance traveled in feet.

== History ==
It was designed in 1935 by golfer Edward S. Stimpson, Sr. (1904–1985). The Massachusetts state amateur champion and former Harvard golf team captain, Stimpson was a spectator at the 1935 U.S. Open at Oakmont near Pittsburgh, where the winning score was 299 (+11). After witnessing a putt by a top professional (Gene Sarazen, a two-time champion) roll off a green, Stimpson was convinced the greens were unreasonably fast, but wondered how he could prove it. He developed a device, made of wood, now known as the Stimpmeter, which is an angled track that releases a ball at a known velocity so that the distance it rolls on a green's surface can be measured.

In 1976, it was redesigned from aluminum by Frank Thomas of the United States Golf Association (USGA). It was first used by the USGA during the 1976 U.S. Open at Atlanta and made available to golf course superintendents in 1978. The 1976 version is painted green.

In January 2013, the USGA announced a third generation device based on work by Steven Quintavalla, a senior research engineer at the USGA labs. A second hole in this version enables the option of a shorter run-out. This version is painted blue, and is manufactured to a higher engineering tolerance to improve accuracy and precision.

== Description ==
The 1976 device is an extruded aluminum bar, 36 inches (91 cm) long and 1.75 inches (4.4 cm) wide, with a 145° V-shaped groove extending along its entire length, supporting the ball at two points, 0.50 in (1.27 cm) apart. It is tapered at one end by removing metal from its underside to reduce the bounce of the ball as it rolls onto the green. It has a notch at a right angle to the length of the bar 30 inches (76 cm) from the lower tapered end where the ball is placed. The notch may be a hole completely through the bar or just a depression in it. The ball is pulled out of the notch by gravity when the device is slowly raised to an angle of about 20°, rolling onto the green at a repeatable velocity of 6.00 ft/s (1.83 m/s). The distance travelled by the ball in feet is the 'speed' of the putting green. Six distances, three in each of two opposite directions, should be averaged on a flat section of the putting green. The three balls in each direction must be within 8 inches (20 cm) of each other for USGA validation of the test.

== Sloped greens ==
One problem is finding a near level surface as required in the USGA handbook. Many greens cannot be correctly measured: there may not be an area where the measured distance (or green speed) in opposing directions is less than a foot, particularly when they are very fast, thus requiring a very long level surface. A formula, based on the work of Isaac Newton, as derived and extensively tested by A. Douglas Brede, solves that problem. The formula is:

$$\frac{2\times S\uparrow \times\ S\downarrow}{S\uparrow +\ S\downarrow}$$

(where S↑ is speed up the slope and S↓ is speed down the slope on the same path). This eliminates the effect of the slope and provides a true green speed even on severely sloped greens.

== Recommendations ==
The USGA stimpmetered putting greens across the country to produce the following recommendations:

Speed	Length
Slow	8 feet (2.4 m)
Medium	10 feet (3.0 m)
Fast	12 feet (3.7 m)

For the U.S. Open, they recommend:

Speed	Length
Slow	10 feet (3.0 m)
Medium	12 feet (3.7 m)
Fast	14 feet (4.3 m)

The greens at Oakmont Country Club (where the device was conceived) are some of the fastest in the world, with readings of 15 feet (4.6 m).
