= Emil Loeffler =

Professional golfer, golf course architect (1895–1948)

Personal information
- Full name: Emil Frederick Loeffler, Jr.
- Nickname: Dutch
- Nationality: United States
- Born: June 5, 1895 Oakmont, Pennsylvania, U.S.
- Died: March 19, 1948 (aged 52) Oakmont, Pennsylvania, U.S.
- Spouse: Hilda Loeffler
- Children: 3

Career
- Sport: Golf
- Status: Professional
- Professional wins: 4

Best results in major championships
- Masters Tournament: DNP
- PGA Championship: T5: 1922
- U.S. Open: 10th: 1921
- The Open Championship: DNP

Emil Frederick "Dutch" Loeffler, Jr. (June 5, 1895 – March 19, 1948) was an American professional golfer and golf course designer.

== Early life ==
Loeffler was born on June 5, 1895, at Oakmont, Pennsylvania, to Swiss immigrants Emil Loeffler, Sr. and his wife Margaret, both of whom were born in Berne, Switzerland.

== Golf career ==
Loeffler had two top-10 finishes in major championships and had four wins in other tournaments. He had a long career as both course superintendent and head professional at Oakmont Country Club.

=== Oakmont Country Club ===
Loeffler started working as a caddy at Oakmont when he was 10. He was promoted to caddiemaster in 1912 and took over as the course's superintendent (greenkeeper) in 1916, a position he retained until 1948. Loeffler assisted in modification of the course, including facilitating addition of many hazards that became a hallmark of Oakmont. After the death of head pro Charley Rowe in 1927, Loeffler assumed that role as well. When he relinquished it in 1947, he was reportedly the highest paid pro in America. His replacement, young Lew Worsham, won the U.S. Open a month after he took charge at Oakmont.

=== U.S. Open ===
Loeffler qualified for six U.S. Opens. His best finish was at the 1921 U.S. Open with a 10th place finish.

=== PGA Championship ===
In 1921, the PGA Championship invited the top 31 professional finishers at the 1921 U.S. Open, along with the defending champion, to the tournament and as such Loeffler was invited. Loeffler finished in a tie for 17th place with his first round loss in match play to Cyril Walker on the 37th hole. Loeffer's best finish at the PGA Championship was a tie for 5th (quarter-final finish) in 1922.

== Golf course design ==
Loeffler is credited with designing over 20 golf courses, including the former Alcoma Golf Club, which was renamed 3 Lakes Golf Course in Penn Hills, Pennsylvania. In 2018, he was elected to the Western Pennsylvania Golf Hall of Fame.

== Military service ==
Loeffler served in the infantry in World War I where he was wounded. He was a corporal in Company E, 327th Infantry, 82nd Division, serving from September 20, 1917, to May 28, 1919.

== Death ==
Loeffler died on March 19, 1948—at the end of a 65-day stay at Presbyterian Hospital—of respiratory failure due to pneumonia. He was a widower, his wife Hilda having preceded him in death in 1945.

== Professional wins (4) ==
- 1920 Pennsylvania Open Championship, Western Pennsylvania Open Championship
- 1922 Pennsylvania Open Championship
- 1933 Tri-State PGA Championship

== Results in major championships ==
Tournament	1920	1921	1922	1923	1924	1925	1926	1927	1928	1929	1930	1931	1932	1933	1934
U.S. Open	T35	10		WD			T49							T63	WD
PGA Championship		R32	QF												

Note: Loeffler played in only the U.S. Open and PGA Championship.

Top 10
Did not play

WD = withdrew
R32, R16, QF, SF = round in which player lost in PGA Championship match play
"T" indicates a tie for a place
