= 1953 U.S. Open (golf) =

Tournament information
- Dates: June 11–13, 1953
- Location: Oakmont, Pennsylvania; 40.526°N 79.827°W
- Course: Oakmont Country Club
- Organized by: USGA
- Tour: PGA Tour

Statistics
- Par: 72
- Length: 6,916 yards (6,324 m)
- Field: 157 players, 60 after cut
- Cut: 153 (+9)
- Prize fund: $20,400
- Winner's share: $5,000

Champion
- (United States) Ben Hogan
- 283 (−5)

Location map
- Location in the United States Location in Pennsylvania

The 1953 U.S. Open was the 53rd U.S. Open, held June 11–13 at Oakmont Country Club in Oakmont, Pennsylvania, a suburb northeast of Pittsburgh. Ben Hogan won a record-tying fourth U.S. Open title, six strokes ahead of runner-up Sam Snead.

== Overview ==
Although a three-time champion, Hogan was required to participate with the rest of the field in 36-hole qualifying on Tuesday and Wednesday, immediately preceding the championship. The only exemption at the time was for the defending champion, Julius Boros. The field for the qualifier was 300, with one round at Oakmont and another at the Pittsburgh Field Club, host of the PGA Championship in 1937.

After qualifying, Hogan shot a tournament-low 67 (−5) in the first round on Thursday and an even-par 72 on Friday to hold a two-stroke lead over Snead and George Fazio. Snead's third-round 72 on Saturday morning left him just a shot back of Hogan heading into the final round in the afternoon. With nine holes to go in the final round, Snead trailed by just one shot. Hogan made three birdies on Oakmont's back nine, including a 25-foot (8 m) birdie putt at 13 on his way to a 71 and a 283 total, six shots clear of Snead, who shot a final round 76. Hogan's first-round 67 and Snead's second-round 69 were the only sub-70 rounds by any players for the entire tournament. Hogan's win at Oakmont was his fourth U.S. Open title, equaling the record of Willie Anderson and Bobby Jones (Jack Nicklaus would win his fourth U.S. Open in 1980). The four wins came in the last five U.S. Opens in which Hogan had entered; he missed the 1949 edition following his near-fatal automobile accident.

Two future champions made their U.S. Open debuts in 1953 as amateurs: Arnold Palmer, 23, of nearby Latrobe and Ken Venturi, 22, of San Francisco. Both missed the cut; Venturi (78-76=154) by one stroke, Palmer (84-78=162) by nine.

== Hogan in 1953 ==
Already the Masters champion, Hogan followed up his U.S. Open win with another at the British Open at Carnoustie a few weeks later. He became the first to win three professional majors in a single season, a feat matched only by Tiger Woods in 2000. Through 2024, Hogan remains the only golfer in history to win the Masters, U.S. Open, and British Open in the same calendar year. His margins of victory in the 1953 majors were five, six, and four strokes, respectively.

In 1953, the final two majors were in conflict on the schedule. The match-play PGA Championship was a seven-day event, held July 1–7 near Detroit; the British Open in Scotland was played July 8–10, with a mandatory 36-hole qualifier on July 6–7.

== Course layout ==
Hole	1	2	3	4	5	6	7	8	9	Out	10	11	12	13	14	15	16	17	18	In	Total
Yards	493	355	428	544	384	183	387	253	480	3,507	470	372	598	161	362	458	234	292	462	3,409	6,916
Par	5	4	4	5	4	3	4	3	5	37	4	4	5	3	4	4	3	4	4	35	72

Lengths of the course for previous major championships:

- 6,882 yards (6,293 m), par 72 - 1951 PGA Championship
- 6,981 yards (6,383 m), par 72 - 1935 U.S. Open
- 6,965 yards (6,369 m), par 72 - 1927 U.S. Open
- 6,707 yards (6,133 m), par 74 - 1922 PGA Championship

The first hole became a par 4 for majors in 1962.

== Round summaries ==
=== First round ===
Thursday, June 11, 1953

Place	Player	Score	To par
1	(United States) Ben Hogan	67	−5
T2	(United States) Walter Burkemo	70	−2
T2	(United States) George Fazio	70	−2
T2	(United States) Frank Souchak (a)	70	−2
T5	(United States) Jimmy Demaret	71	−1
T5	(United States) Bill Ogden	71	−1
T7	(United States) Lou Barbaro	72	E
T7	(United States) Jerry Barber	72	E
T7	(United States) Jay Hebert	72	E
T7	(United States) Sam Snead	72	E

=== Second round ===
Friday, June 12, 1953

Place	Player	Score	To par
1	(United States) Ben Hogan	67-72=139	−5
T2	(United States) George Fazio	70-71=141	−3
T2	(United States) Sam Snead	72-69=141	−3
4	(United States) Lloyd Mangrum	73-70=143	−1
5	(United States) Jay Hebert	72-72=144	E
6	(United States) Dick Metz	75-70=145	+1
T7	(United States) Al Mengert	75-71=146	+2
T7	(United States) Frank Souchak (a)	70-76=146	+2
T9	(United States) Jerry Barber	72-75=147	+3
T9	(United States) Julius Boros	75-72=147	+3
T9	(United States) Jimmy Demaret	71-76=147	+3
T9	(United States) Fred Haas	74-73=147	+3
T9	(United States) Marty Furgol	73-74=147	+3
T9	(United States) Ted Kroll	76-71=147	+3

=== Third round ===
Saturday, June 13, 1953 (morning)

Place	Player	Score	To par
1	(United States) Ben Hogan	67-72-73=212	−4
2	(United States) Sam Snead	72-69-72=213	−3
T3	(United States) Jimmy Demaret	71-76-71=218	+2
T3	(United States) George Fazio	70-71-77=218	+2
T3	(United States) Jay Hebert	72-72-74=218	+2
T6	(United States) Fred Haas	74-73-72=219	+3
T6	(United States) Dick Metz	75-70-74=219	+3
T8	(United States) Jack Burke Jr.	76-73-72=221	+5
T8	(United States) Ted Kroll	76-71-74=221	+5
T10	(United States) Dutch Harrison	77-75-70=222	+6
T10	(South Africa) Bobby Locke	78-70-74=222	+6
T10	(United States) Frank Souchak (a)	70-76-76=222	+6

=== Final round ===
Saturday, June 13, 1953 (afternoon)

Place	Player	Score	To par	Money ($)
1	(United States) Ben Hogan	67-72-73-71=283	−5	5,000
2	(United States) Sam Snead	72-69-72-76=289	+1	3,000
3	(United States) Lloyd Mangrum	73-70-74-75=292	+4	1,500
T4	(United States) Pete Cooper	78-75-71-70=294	+6	816
T4	(United States) Jimmy Demaret	71-76-71-76=294	+6	816
T4	(United States) George Fazio	70-71-77-76=294	+6	816
T7	(United States) Ted Kroll	76-71-74-74=295	+7	450
T7	(United States) Dick Metz	75-70-74-76=295	+7	450
T9	(United States) Marty Furgol	73-74-76-73=296	+8	325
T9	(United States) Jay Hebert	72-72-74-78=296	+8	325
T9	(United States) Frank Souchak (a)	70-76-76-74=296	+8	0

(a) denotes amateur
