= Tri-State PGA Championship =

The Tri-State PGA Championship is a golf tournament that is the championship of the Tri-State section of the PGA of America. The Tri-State area includes all of West Virginia, the northwest corner of Maryland, and western Pennsylvania. It has been played annually since 1931 at a variety of courses in that area.

== Winners ==
- 2026 Michael Gervais
- 2025 Justin Collins
- 2024 Rob McClellan
- 2023 Devin Gee
- 2022 Kevin Shields
- 2021 Rob McClellan
- 2020 John Aber
- 2019 Devin Gee
- 2018 Kevin Shields
- 2017 Justin Collins
- 2016 Roy Vucinich
- 2015 Kevin Shields
- 2014 Denny Dolci
- 2013 Rob McClellan
- 2012 Joe Boros
- 2011 Rob McClellan
- 2010 Barry G. Evans
- 2009 Barry G. Evans
- 2008 Brad Westfall
- 2007 Brad Westfall
- 2006 Bob Ford
- 2005 Sean Farren
- 2004 Sean Farren
- 2003 Barry G. Evans
- 2002 Bob Ford
- 2001 John Aber
- 2000 John Mazza
- 1999 Bob Ford
- 1998 Barry G. Evans
- 1997 Ed Vietmeier
- 1996 Ned Weaver
- 1995 Bob Ford
- 1994 Bob Ford
- 1993 Ed Vietmeier
- 1992 Harry Toscano
- 1991 John Aubrey
- 1990 Cleve Coldwater
- 1989 Scott Davis
- 1988 Roy Vucinich
- 1987 Dale Loeslein
- 1986 Ron Milanovich
- 1985 John Mazza
- 1984 Bob Ford
- 1983 Mike Evans
- 1982 Bob Ford
- 1981 Jim Ferree
- 1980 Bob Ford
- 1979 Mike Evans
- 1978 Jim Ferree
- 1977 Roy Vucinich
- 1976 Chuck Scally
- 1975 Chuck Scally
- 1974 Norm Rack
- 1973 Roland Stafford
- 1972 Roland Stafford
- 1971 Chuck Scally
- 1970 Billy Capps
- 1969 Chuck Scally
- 1968 Roland Stafford
- 1967 Billy Capps
- 1966 Joe Taylor
- 1965 Ed Furgol
- 1964 Frank Kiraly
- 1963 Ed Furgol
- 1962 Ed Furgol
- 1961 Lew Worsham
- 1960 Andy Borkovich
- 1959 Mike Krak
- 1958 Mike Krak
- 1957 Joby Conner
- 1956 Mike Pavella
- 1955 Carl Beljan
- 1954 Mike Pavella
- 1953 Joe Taylor
- 1952 Tom "Red" Blaskovich
- 1951 Mike Pavella
- 1950 Bobby Cruickshank
- 1949 Bobby Cruickshank
- 1948 Rut Coffey
- 1947 Dick Shoemaker
- 1946 Dick Shoemaker
- 1945 Sam Parks Jr.
- 1944 Monty Onoretta
- 1943 Sam Parks Jr.
- 1942 Ted Luther
- 1941 Perry Delvecchio
- 1940 Arthur Clark
- 1939 Dick Shoemaker
- 1938 Ted Luther
- 1937 Sam Parks Jr.
- 1936 Tony Joy
- 1935 Perry Delvecchio
- 1934 Perry Delvecchio
- 1933 Emil Loeffler
- 1932 Ted Luther
- 1931 Perry Delvecchio
