= Sam Parks Jr. =

American professional golfer

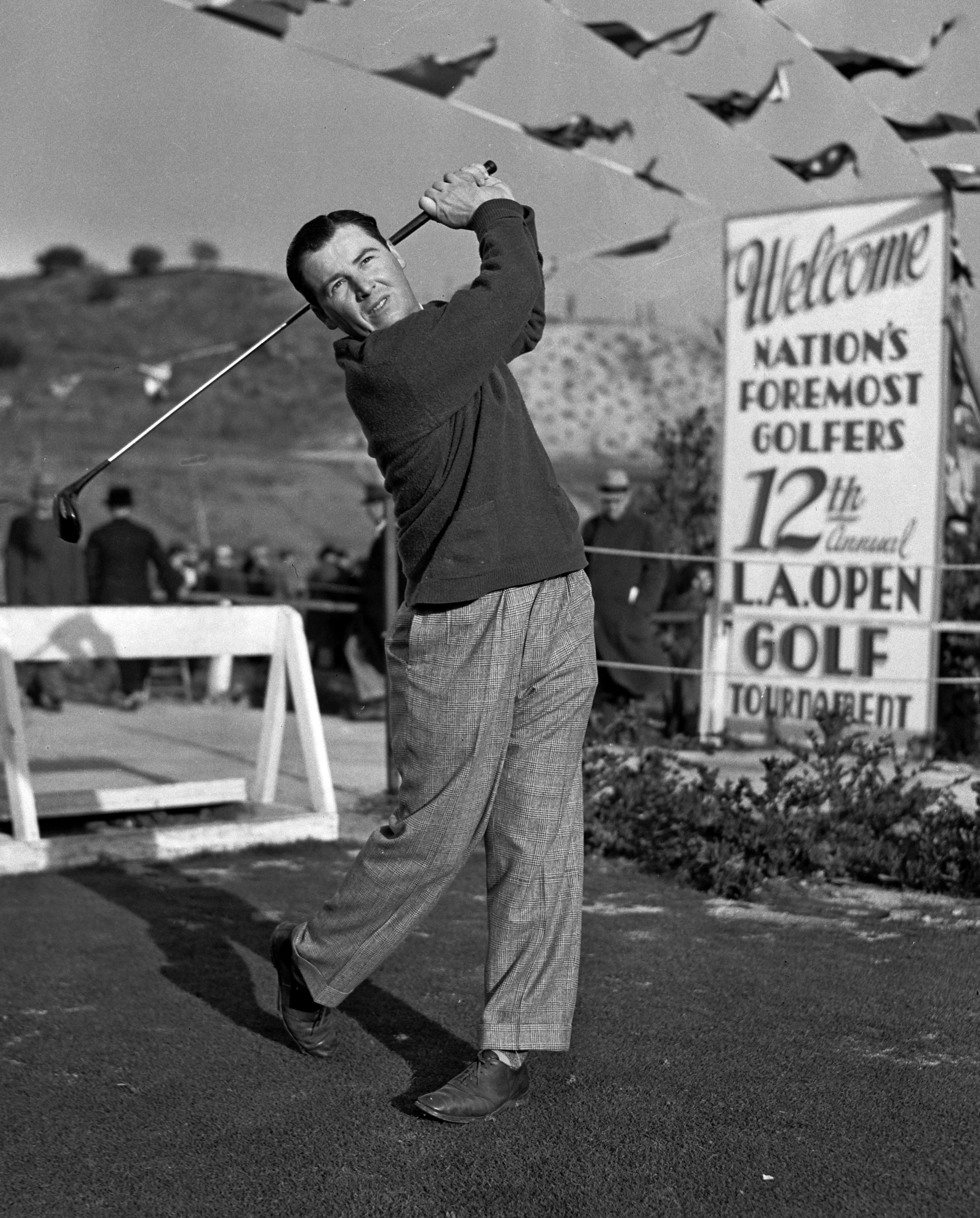
- Parks in 1937

Personal information
- Full name: Samuel McLaughlin Parks Jr.
- Nationality: United States
- Born: June 23, 1909 Bellevue, Pennsylvania, U.S.
- Died: April 7, 1997 (aged 87) Clearwater, Florida, U.S.

Career
- Sport: Golf
- College: University of Pittsburgh
- Turned professional: 1933
- Former tour: PGA Tour
- Professional wins: 5

Number of wins by tour
- PGA Tour: 1
- Other: 4

Best results in major championships (wins: 1)
- Masters Tournament: T15: 1935
- PGA Championship: T9: 1935
- U.S. Open: Won: 1935
- The Open Championship: DNP

Samuel McLaughlin Parks Jr. (June 23, 1909 – April 7, 1997) was an American professional golfer, the winner of the U.S. Open in 1935, his only major title.

== Career ==
In 1909, Park was born in Bellevue, Pennsylvania, near Pittsburgh. He used his knowledge of the nearby Oakmont Country Club to win the 1935 U.S. Open at age 25.

Although a comparatively recent convert from college and amateur ranks and little-known nationally, Parks, the professional at the nearby South Hills Country Club, was the only player to negotiate Oakmont's furrowed bunkers and shaved greens in less than 300 strokes. After winning the U.S. Open, Parks played for the U.S. Ryder Cup team, matched against Alf Perry (the reigning British Open champion), the first time the U.S. Open champion would play the British Open Champion of the same year in the Ryder Cup Match. During that event, at the 36th hole, Parks made a 30-foot (9 m) birdie putt to win the hole and tie the match, so that both he and the British champ remained undefeated in Ryder Cup play.

== Personal life ==
Parks, a University of Pittsburgh alumnus who helped found the school's golf team in the 1920s, died in 1997 at age 87 in Clearwater, Florida.

== Professional wins (5) ==
=== PGA Tour wins (1) ===
Year	Tournament	Winning score	Margin	Runner-up
1935	U.S. Open	+11 (77-73-73-76=299)	2 strokes	(United States) Jimmy Thomson

=== Other wins (4) ===
this list may be incomplete

- 1937 Tri-State PGA Championship
- 1940 Pennsylvania Open Championship
- 1943 Tri-State PGA Championship
- 1945 Tri-State PGA Championship

== Major championships ==
=== Wins (1) ===
Year	Championship	54 holes	Winning score	Margin	Runner-up
1935	U.S. Open	Tied for lead	+11 (77-73-73-76=299)	2 strokes	(United States) Jimmy Thomson

=== Results timeline ===
Tournament	1931	1932	1933	1934	1935	1936	1937	1938	1939
Masters Tournament	NYF	NYF	NYF	T46	T15	T20	T36	24	
U.S. Open	CUT	T66		T37	1	CUT	T16	CUT	T38
PGA Championship					R16		R32	R64	R64

Tournament	1940	1941	1942	1943	1944	1945	1946	1947	1948	1949
Masters Tournament		T19		NT	NT	NT				
U.S. Open	T29	T33	NT	NT	NT	NT	CUT	CUT		
PGA Championship			R32	NT						

Tournament	1950	1951	1952	1953	1954	1955	1956	1957	1958	1959
Masters Tournament				50	72	61	T65	CUT	CUT	CUT
U.S. Open		CUT								
PGA Championship										

Tournament	1960	1961	1962
Masters Tournament	CUT	CUT	CUT
U.S. Open			
PGA Championship			

Note: Parks never played in The Open Championship.

Win
Top 10
Did not play

NYF = tournament not yet founded
NT = no tournament
CUT = missed the half-way cut
R64, R32, R16, QF, SF = round in which player lost in PGA Championship match play
"T" indicates a tie for a place

=== Summary ===
Tournament	Wins	2nd	3rd	Top-5	Top-10	Top-25	Events	Cuts made
Masters Tournament	0	0	0	0	0	4	16	10
U.S. Open	1	0	0	1	1	2	13	7
The Open Championship	0	0	0	0	0	0	0	0
PGA Championship	0	0	0	0	1	3	5	5
Totals	1	0	0	1	2	9	34	22

- Most consecutive cuts made – 7 (twice)
- Longest streak of top-10s – 2 (1935 U.S. Open – 1935 PGA)
