= Ralph Landrum =

American professional golfer (born 1957)

Personal information
- Nationality: United States
- Born: August 16, 1957 (age 69) Covington, Kentucky, U.S.
- Height: 6 ft 2 in (1.88 m)
- Weight: 225 lb (102 kg; 16.1 st)
- Spouse: Mary Pat
- Children: Joe, Kyle

Career
- Sport: Golf
- College: University of Kentucky
- Turned professional: 1979
- Former tour: PGA Tour
- Professional wins: 5

Best results in major championships
- Masters Tournament: CUT: 1978, 1984
- PGA Championship: CUT: 1985, 1988, 1989
- U.S. Open: T8: 1983
- The Open Championship: DNP

Ralph Landrum (born August 16, 1957) is an American professional golfer.

== Early life and amateur career ==
In 1957, Landrum was born in Covington, Kentucky. He played college golf at the University of Kentucky.

== Professional career ==
In 1979, Landrum turned professional. Landrum played on the PGA Tour from 1983 to 1985. His best finish was a T-2 at the 1984 Danny Thomas Memphis Classic. His best finish in a major was a T-8 at the 1983 U.S. Open.

Since his touring career, Landrum founded Landrum Golf Management and continues to work as a PGA Master professional. As of 2019, Golf Digest lists Landrum as a top golf instructor in the state of Kentucky.

== Personal life ==
Landrum's sons, Kyle and Joe, played college golf at Murray State University in Kentucky.

== Professional wins ==
- 1986 Kentucky PGA Championship
- 1987 Kentucky Open, Kentucky PGA Championship, Kentucky PGA Match Play Championship
- 1988 Kentucky PGA Match Play Championship

== Results in major championships ==
| Tournament | 1978 | 1979 | 1980 | 1981 | 1982 | 1983 | 1984 | 1985 | 1986 | 1987 | 1988 | 1989 |
|---|---|---|---|---|---|---|---|---|---|---|---|---|
| Masters Tournament | CUT | | | | | | CUT | | | | | |
| U.S. Open | | | | CUT | CUT | T8 | CUT | CUT | | T46 | | |
| PGA Championship | | | | | | | | CUT | | | CUT | CUT |

Note: Landrum never played in The Open Championship.

Top 10
Did not play

CUT = missed the half-way cut
"T" = tied
