= Alexander Findlay (golfer) =

American golfer (1866–1942)

Alexander H. Findlay
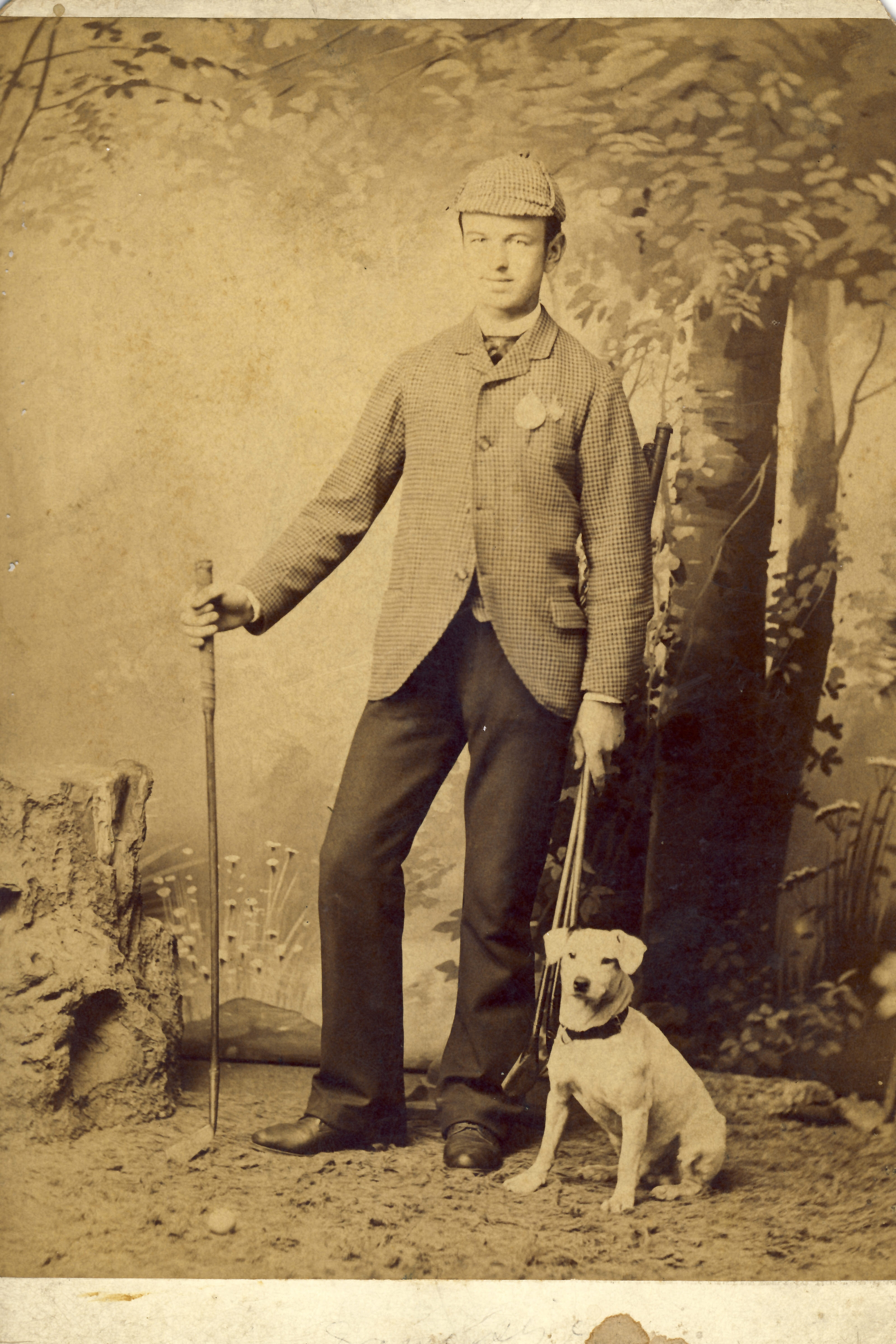
- Findlay in 1886
- Born: April 21, 1866
- Died: April 16, 1942 (aged 75); Philadelphia, Pennsylvania, U.S.
- Occupation: Architect
- Projects: Pittsburgh Field Club, Llanerch Country Club, Tavistock Country Club, Reading Country Club

Alexander Hamburg Findlay (April 21, 1866 – April 16, 1942) was a Scottish-American golf course architect, professional golfer, golf club maker, and promoter of the game of golf in the United States. He was labeled the "Father of American Golf" by his promoters at Wanamaker's Department Store in the 1910s and 1920s.

== Personal life ==
Findlay was born at sea in the English Channel in 1866, the son of Alexander and Mary Ann Milne Findlay. Findlay Sr was a sergeant in the British Army and the family was on the way to Gibraltar when Alex Jr was born. He spent his early years in Cornwall, England, before the family moved to Montrose, Scotland, around 1874.

Findlay began playing golf while in Montrose after his mother purchased a set of clubs for him at 8 years old. He learned under the tutelage of Bob Dow, a golf professional.

=== Balmoral ===
In 1873, Findlay met a young Prince Albert and George V on the River Dee near Balmoral Castle. Findlay was playing with his boats while his father and brothers were fishing, and young George emerged from the nearby woods and began throwing rocks at Findlay's boat. The boys got into a fight, which had to be broken up by John Brown, who was accompanying Albert and George on his walk along the river. Brown brought the boys back to Balmoral, where Findlay met Queen Victoria. Findlay and George became lifelong friends and exchanged many gifts with one another over the years.

=== Ireland ===
Findlay was educated at the Royal Hibernian Military School in Phoenix Park, Dublin, from 1874 to 1879. He took his golf clubs and a ball to Ireland with him, making him one of the earliest known golfers in that country.

=== Linen apprentice ===
Findlay returned to Montrose after military school and became an apprentice in the linen business. He continued to play golf and joined the Montrose Mercantile Golf Club in the mid-1880s.

=== Merchiston Ranch ===
Findlay left Scotland in 1887 for America. His childhood friend, E. C. Millar, had purchased a ranch in Nebraska and asked Findlay to join him there. Findlay served as a cowhand at the Merichiston Ranch, just east of Fullerton, for two years before an injury ended his cowboying career.

== The first 72 ==
Findlay broke the record at Montrose on August 12, 1886, when he shot a 72 during a monthly badge competition.

== Career ==
=== Wright & Ditson ===
Findlay took control of the golf department at Wright & Ditson in July 1897. He remained with the sporting goods store until 1909. At Wright & Ditson, Findlay developed his own line of golf clubs known as the "A. H. Findlay." The line included irons, putters, and woods under the Wright & Ditson label.

=== Florida East Coast Railroad ===
Henry Flagler hired Findlay to be the "Golfer-in-Chief" of the Florida East Coast Golf Club in 1898. The golf club included five courses, all on the Florida East Coast Railway in Flagler resort cities: St. Augustine, Ormond, Palm Beach, Miami, and Nassau. Findlay ran the golf club during the winters until the spring of 1902. During his time there, Findlay built or renovated each of the courses over which he had charge.

=== Harry Vardon's 1900 Tour of America ===
In November 1899, Findlay went to England, on behalf of Spalding, to encourage Harry Vardon to tour the United States during 1900 and promote his line of Spalding Golf Clubs and the Vardon Flyer golf ball. Vardon and Findlay played 36 holes together at Ganton Golf Club; Vardon won.

Vardon arrived in the U.S. in February 1900 and met with Findlay at the Spalding Golf Club factory at Chicopee, Massachusetts, to tour the facility.

During the tour, Vardon played in 97 matches. 17 of those were against Findlay and/or Findlay and a partner. Vardon won 13 of the 17 matches against Findlay and his partners.

=== Wanamaker's Department Store ===
Findlay left Wright & Ditson's in 1909 to take a job with Wanamaker's Department Store in Philadelphia, Pennsylvania. He spent the remainder of his life living and working in and around the Philadelphia area.

== Results in major championships ==
Findlay played in the U.S. Open on six occasions:

Tournament	1898	1899	1900	1901	1902	1903
U.S. Open	13	11	Withdrew	Withdrew	30	36

== Architecture ==
The first golf course that Findlay ever designed or built was on the prairie of Merchiston Ranch in April 1887. He built six holes and played often with the ranch's owner, E. C. Millar.

Findlay's early courses (1897–1905) were naturalistic, building the holes and greens upon the natural features of the landscape with minimal intervention done by the architect or builder. His later courses 1915–1930) continued to adhere to the principles of naturalism, favoring the natural topography of the landscape, but became much more sophisticated.
