= 1962 U.S. Open (golf) =

Tournament information
- Dates: June 14–17, 1962
- Location: Oakmont, Pennsylvania; 40.526°N 79.827°W
- Course: Oakmont Country Club
- Organized by: USGA
- Tour: PGA Tour

Statistics
- Par: 71
- Length: 6,894 yards (6,304 m)
- Field: 150 players, 51 after cut
- Cut: 150 (+8)
- Prize fund: $73,800
- Winner's share: $17,500

Champion
- (United States) Jack Nicklaus
- 283 (−1), playoff
- Location in the United States Location in Pennsylvania

The 1962 U.S. Open was the 62nd U.S. Open, held June 14–17 at Oakmont Country Club in Oakmont, Pennsylvania, a suburb northeast of Pittsburgh. Jack Nicklaus defeated 1960 champion Arnold Palmer in an 18-hole Sunday playoff that marked the beginning of their legendary rivalry. For Nicklaus, it was his first professional win, the first of four U.S. Open titles and a record 18 major championships. Though just 22, it was Nicklaus' sixth U.S. Open and tenth major, having played in four Masters. He had won the U.S. Amateur twice (1959, 1961) and was the top amateur at the previous two Opens, placing second to Palmer in 1960 and fourth in 1961.

Nicklaus earned $15,000 for his first professional win, and Palmer $8,000 as runner-up. Each received a playoff bonus of $2,500 from the Sunday gate receipts.

Only two of the six former champions in the field made the 36-hole cut, Palmer and defending champion Gene Littler.

== Course layout ==
Hole	1	2	3	4	5	6	7	8	9	Out	10	11	12	13	14	15	16	17	18	In	Total
Yards	455	355	428	544	384	183	403	253	480	3,485	470	372	598	161	362	458	234	292	462	3,409	6,894
Par	4	4	4	5	4	3	4	3	5	36	4	4	5	3	4	4	3	4	4	35	71

Lengths of the course for previous major championships:

- 6,916 yards (6,324 m), par 72 - 1953 U.S. Open
- 6,882 yards (6,293 m), par 72 - 1951 PGA Championship
- 6,981 yards (6,383 m), par 72 - 1935 U.S. Open
- 6,965 yards (6,369 m), par 72 - 1927 U.S. Open
- 6,707 yards (6,133 m), par 74 - 1922 PGA Championship

The first hole was a par 5 for the previous majors at Oakmont, set at 493 yards (451 m) in 1953.

== Round summaries ==
=== First round ===
Thursday, June 14, 1962

Defending champion Littler took the first round lead with a 69 (−2) before a record opening round gallery of 17,486, mostly following Palmer in the afternoon, paired with Nicklaus. The previous record was 13,916 in 1960 near Denver.

Place	Player	Score	To par
1	(United States) Gene Littler	69	−2
T2	(United States) Bobby Nichols	70	−1
T2	(United States) Bob Rosburg	70	−1
T4	(United States) Frank Boynton	71	E
T4	(United States) J. C. Goosie	71	E
T4	(United States) Arnold Palmer	71	E
T4	(South Africa) Gary Player	71	E
T4	(United States) Robert Schoener	71	E
T9	(United States) Eugene Francis (a)	72	+1
T9	(United States) John Guenther (a)	72	+1
T9	(Canada) Stan Leonard	72	+1
T9	(United States) Jack Nicklaus	72	+1

=== Second round ===
Friday, June 15, 1962

Palmer carded a 68 in the morning and Bob Rosburg a 69 to co-lead after 36 holes at 139 (−3), with Nicklaus three strokes back in a tie for fourth. Palmer and Nicklaus were paired together in the first two rounds. The second round attendance record was broken with 19,971 in the gallery, surpassing the previous mark of 15,225 set in 1961 near Detroit.

Place	Player	Score	To par
T1	(United States) Arnold Palmer	71-68=139	−3
T1	(United States) Bob Rosburg	70-69=139	−3
3	(United States) Billy Maxwell	71-70=141	−1
T4	(United States) Bobby Nichols	70-72=142	E
T4	(United States) Jack Nicklaus	72-70=142	E
T4	(South Africa) Gary Player	71-71=142	E
T7	(United States) Miller Barber	73-70=143	+1
T7	(United States) Gene Littler	69-74=143	+1
T9	(United States) Phil Rodgers	74-70=144	+2
T9	(United States) Don Whitt	73-71=144	+2

=== Third round ===
Saturday, June 16, 1962 - (morning)

Place	Player	Score	To par
T1	(United States) Bobby Nichols	70-72-70=212	−1
T1	(United States) Arnold Palmer	71-68-73=212	−1
T3	(United States) Phil Rodgers	74-70-69=213	E
T3	(United States) Bob Rosburg	70-69-74=213	E
T5	(United States) Jack Nicklaus	72-70-72=214	+1
T5	(South Africa) Gary Player	71-71-72=214	+1
7	(United States) Gene Littler	69-74-72=215	+2
8	(United States) Billy Maxwell	71-70-75=216	+3
9	(United States) Art Wall Jr.	73-72-72=217	+4
T10	(United States) Gay Brewer	73-72-73=218	+5
T10	(United States) Tommy Jacobs	74-71-73=218	+5

=== Final round ===
Saturday, June 16, 1962 - (afternoon)

After 54 holes at Oakmont, Palmer held a share of the lead with Bobby Nichols, with Phil Rodgers and Bob Rosburg a stroke back, and Nicklaus and Gary Player two back. Rosburg shot a 79 (+8) in the final round and quickly fell out of contention, while Nichols and Rodgers carded scores of 73 and 72, respectively, to share 3rd place. But the story of this day was the duel between Palmer and Nicklaus. Although he bogeyed the 9th, Palmer still led Nicklaus as they made the turn. That would change quickly as Nicklaus birdied 11 and Palmer bogeyed 13, evening up the score. Nicklaus missed a birdie attempt at the last to finish with a 69, while Palmer missed a birdie at 18 from 12 feet (4 m) that would have won the championship. This set up an 18-hole playoff between golf's most popular player and the game's rising star.

Place	Player	Score	To par	Money ($)
T1	(United States) Jack Nicklaus	72-70-72-69=283	−1	Playoff
T1	(United States) Arnold Palmer	71-68-73-71=283	−1	Playoff
T3	(United States) Bobby Nichols	70-72-70-73=285	+1	5,500
T3	(United States) Phil Rodgers	74-70-69-72=285	+1	5,500
5	(United States) Gay Brewer	73-72-73-69=287	+3	4,000
T6	(United States) Tommy Jacobs	74-71-73-70=288	+4	2,750
T6	(South Africa) Gary Player	71-71-72-74=288	+4	2,750
T8	(United States) Doug Ford	74-75-71-70=290	+6	1,767
T8	(United States) Gene Littler	69-74-72-75=290	+6	1,767
T8	(United States) Billy Maxwell	71-70-75-74=290	+6	1,767

==== Scorecard ====
Final round

Hole	1	2	3	4	5	6	7	8	9	10	11	12	13	14	15	16	17	18
Par	4	4	4	5	4	3	4	3	5	4	4	5	3	4	4	3	4	4
(United States) Nicklaus	+2	+2	+2	+2	+2	+2	+1	+1	E	E	−1	−1	−1	−1	−1	−1	−1	−1
(United States) Palmer	−1	−2	−2	−3	−3	−3	−3	−3	−2	−2	−2	−2	−1	−1	−1	−1	−1	−1

Cumulative tournament scores, relative to par

Birdie	Bogey

=== Playoff ===
Sunday, June 17, 1962

The 10,000 that showed up for the playoff on Sunday were decidedly pro-Palmer, constantly taunting the 22-year-old upstart from Ohio. (Palmer was from nearby Latrobe and had won two of the last three majors, with five overall.) Nicklaus, however, silenced the crowd by going up by four strokes after six holes. Palmer then launched one of his patented charges with birdies at 9, 11, and 12 to close within one, but a three-putt bogey at 13 proved to be costly for Palmer. Nicklaus held him off from there and prevailed by three strokes, carding a 71 to Palmer's 74. Nicklaus won the championship on the greens; he had just one three-putt the entire week, while Palmer had 10. Nicklaus became the youngest winner of the U.S. Open since Bobby Jones in 1923, and became the first since Jones to hold the Open and the U.S. Amateur championship at the same time; he had won the Amateur the previous year before turning pro in the winter. For Palmer, this began a frustrating stretch as a runner-up in four U.S. Opens in six years, with three in playoffs. His words after the tournament proved prophetic, saying of Nicklaus: "Now that the big guy is out of the cage, everybody better run for cover."

Place	Player	Score	To par	Money ($)
1	(United States) Jack Nicklaus	71	E	17,500
2	(United States) Arnold Palmer	74	+3	10,500

- Included in earnings is a playoff bonus of $2,500 each, from the playoff gate receipts.

==== Scorecard ====
Playoff

Hole	1	2	3	4	5	6	7	8	9	10	11	12	13	14	15	16	17	18
Par	4	4	4	5	4	3	4	3	5	4	4	5	3	4	4	3	4	4
(United States) Nicklaus	E	E	E	−1	−1	−2	−2	−1	−1	−1	−1	−1	−1	−1	−1	−1	−1	E
(United States) Palmer	+1	+1	+1	+1	+1	+2	+2	+3	+2	+2	+1	E	+1	+1	+1	+1	+1	+3

Birdie	Bogey	Double bogey
