= 1937 PGA Championship =

Coordinates: 40.513°N 79.89°W

Tournament information
- Dates: May 24–30, 1937
- Location: Fox Chapel, Pennsylvania
- Course: Pittsburgh Field Club
- Organized by: PGA of America
- Tour: PGA Tour
- Format: Match play - 6 rounds

Statistics
- Par: 72
- Length: 6,665 yards (6,094 m)
- Field: 106 players, 64 to match play
- Cut: 157 (+13), playoff
- Prize fund: $9,200
- Winner's share: $1,000

Champion
- (United States) Denny Shute
- def. Jug McSpaden, 37 holes

Location in the United States
Location in Pennsylvania

The 1937 PGA Championship was the 20th PGA Championship, held May 24–30 at Pittsburgh Field Club in Fox Chapel, Pennsylvania, a suburb northeast of Pittsburgh. Then a match play championship, Denny Shute won his second consecutive PGA Championship in less than seven months, defeating Jug McSpaden in 37 holes. The previous edition in 1936 was held in November at Pinehurst, North Carolina.

Shute was 3 holes up after the morning round of the finals, but McSpaden had the lead with nine holes remaining and was 2 up with three holes to go. McSpaden bogeyed the 34th and double-bogeyed the 35th to square up the match as they went to the 36th tee. McSpaden missed a four-foot (1.2 m) birdie putt to win and they halved the hole and went to an extra hole. McSpaden lipped out his par-saving putt from 8 feet (2.4 m) to end the match.

Shute was the last to successfully defend his title at the PGA Championship until Tiger Woods won consecutive titles in 1999 and 2000. It was Shute's third and final major title; his first was at the British Open in 1933 at St. Andrews.

Usually played later in the schedule, this PGA Championship was in late May, the first of three times it was held before the U.S. Open and British Open. Prior to World War II, the PGA Championship was most often played in September, but ranged from late May (1937, 1942) to early December (1929). Since 1969, it has been held in early to mid-August, except for 1971 (February) and 2016 (July).

== Format ==
The match play format at the PGA Championship in 1937 called for 12 rounds (216 holes) in seven days:

- Monday and Tuesday – 36-hole stroke play qualifier, 18 holes per day;
  - defending champion and top 63 professionals advanced to match play
- Wednesday – first two rounds, 18 holes each
- Thursday – third round – 36 holes
- Friday – quarterfinals – 36 holes
- Saturday – semifinals – 36 holes
- Sunday – final – 36 holes

== Final results ==
Sunday, May 30, 1937

| Place | Player | Money ($) |
|---|---|---|
| 1 | (United States) Denny Shute | 1,000 |
| 2 | (United States) Jug McSpaden | 500 |
| T3 | (United States) Ky Laffoon | 250 |
| T3 | (United States) Tony Manero | 250 |
| T5 | (United States) Harry Cooper | 200 |
| T5 | (United States) Jimmy Hines | 200 |
| T5 | (United States) Byron Nelson | 200 |
| T5 | (United States) Henry Picard | 200 |

== Final eight bracket ==
Quarter-finals; May 28
Denny Shute | 4&3
Jimmy Hines
Tony Manero | 1up
Harry Cooper
Jug McSpaden | 39h
Henry Picard
Ky Laffoon | 2&1
Byron Nelson

Semi-finals; May 29
Denny Shute | 3&2
Tony Manero
Jug McSpaden | 2&1
Ky Laffoon

Finals; May 30
Denny Shute | 37h
Jug McSpaden

== Final match scorecards ==
Morning

| Hole | 1 | 2 | 3 | 4 | 5 | 6 | 7 | 8 | 9 | 10 | 11 | 12 | 13 | 14 | 15 | 16 | 17 | 18 |
|---|---|---|---|---|---|---|---|---|---|---|---|---|---|---|---|---|---|---|
| Par | 4 | 4 | 5 | 3 | 5 | 3 | 4 | 4 | 4 | 4 | 4 | 5 | 4 | 3 | 5 | 3 | 4 | 4 |
| (United States) Shute | 5 | 4 | 5 | 3 | 5 | 2 | 3 | 5 | 3 | 5 | 5 | 4 | 3 | 3 | 6 | 3 | 3 | 3 |
| (United States) McSpaden | 3 | 4 | 4 | 3 | 4 | 3 | ^ | 5 | 4 | 5 | 4 | 5 | 4 | 4 | 5 | 3 | ^ | 4 |
| Leader | M1 | M1 | M2 | M2 | M3 | M2 | M1 | M1 | – | – | M1 | – | S1 | S2 | S1 | S1 | S2 | S3 |

Afternoon

| Hole | 1 | 2 | 3 | 4 | 5 | 6 | 7 | 8 | 9 | 10 | 11 | 12 | 13 | 14 | 15 | 16 | 17 | 18 |
|---|---|---|---|---|---|---|---|---|---|---|---|---|---|---|---|---|---|---|
| Par | 4 | 4 | 5 | 3 | 5 | 3 | 4 | 4 | 4 | 4 | 4 | 5 | 4 | 3 | 5 | 3 | 4 | 4 |
| (United States) Shute | 6 | 4 | 5 | 2 | 5 | 3 | 4 | 5 | 5 | 4 | 5 | 4 | 5 | 4 | 5 | 3 | 5 | 4 |
| (United States) McSpaden | 4 | 3 | 5 | 3 | 4 | 3 | 4 | 4 | 4 | 5 | 5 | 4 | 4 | 3 | 5 | 4 | ^ | 4 |
| Leader | S2 | S1 | S1 | S2 | S1 | S1 | S1 | – | M1 | – | – | – | M1 | M2 | M2 | M1 | – | – |

^ = picked up ball (hole concession)

Extra hole

| Hole | 1 |
|---|---|
| Par | 4 |
| (United States) Shute | 4 |
| (United States) McSpaden | 5 |
| Leader | S1 |

| Birdie | Bogey | Double bogey |
