= Jimmy Thomson (golfer) =

Scottish-American professional golfer (1908–1985)

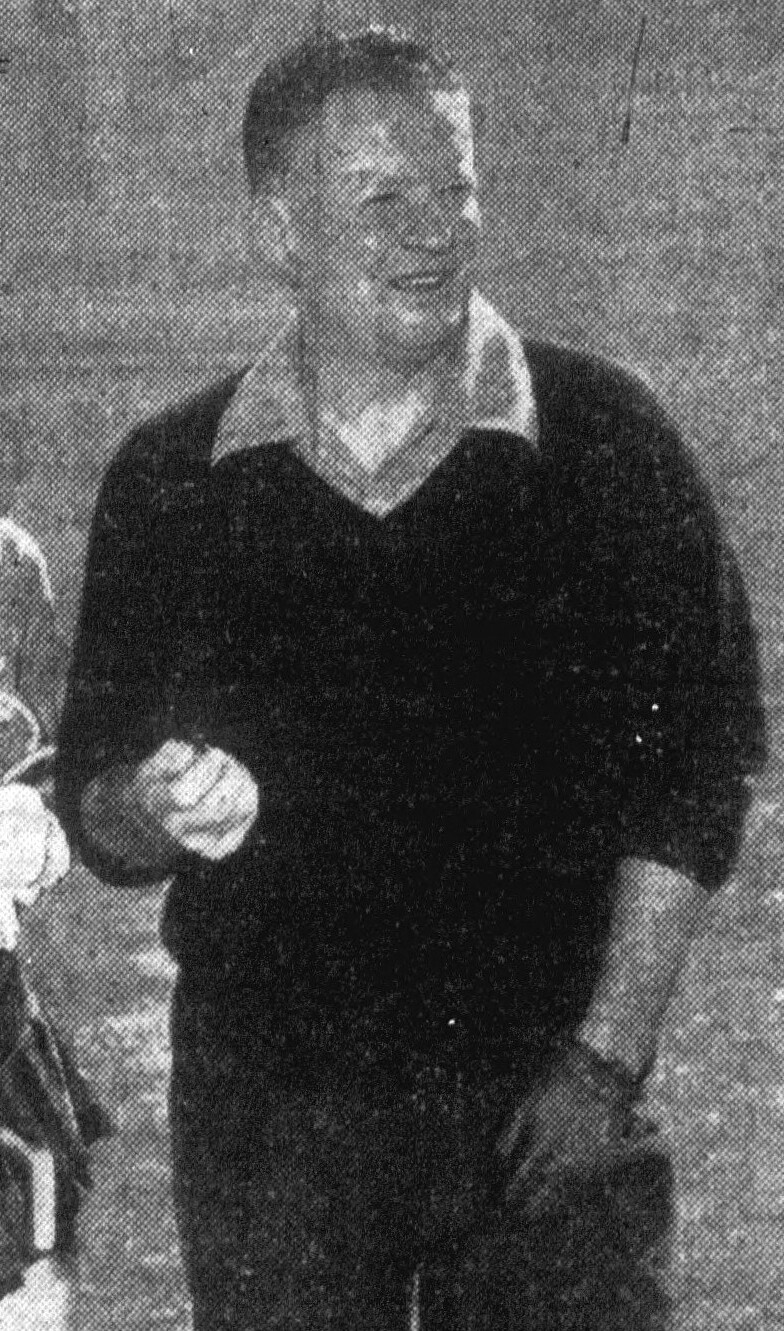
- Thompson at the 1954 Los Angeles Open

Personal information
- Full name: James Wilfred Stevenson Thomson
- Nationality: Scotland; United States
- Born: 29 October 1908 North Berwick, Scotland
- Died: 28 June 1985 (aged 76) Miami, Florida, U.S.

Career
- Sport: Golf
- Status: Professional
- Former tour: PGA Tour
- Professional wins: 5

Number of wins by tour
- PGA Tour: 2
- Other: 3

Best results in major championships
- Masters Tournament: 6th: 1937
- PGA Championship: 2nd: 1936
- U.S. Open: 2nd: 1935
- The Open Championship: T13: 1929

James Wilfred Stevenson Thomson (29 October 1908 – 28 June 1985) was a Scottish-born professional golfer who played exclusively in the United States.

== Early life ==
Thomson was born in North Berwick, the son of pro golfer Wilfred Thomson. His cousin Jack White won the 1904 Open Championship.

Thomson was born into what was called "famous Thomson golfing dynasty." That extended family included: Willie Thomson, an uncle; Ben Sayers, an uncle; Davie Grant, an uncle; Wilfred Thomson, his father and head professional at various UK and US golf clubs including The Country Club of Virginia; Jack White, an uncle; George Thomson, a cousin and a head pro at numerous UK clubs and the first professional at the Longniddry Golf Club in Scotland.

In 1921, his father Wilfred was appointed pro at The Country Club of Virginia. The following year, Jimmy sailed to the U.S. with his mother and sister Emily.

== Professional career ==
Thomson is notable for losing the 1936 PGA Championship to Denny Shute, 3&2. In addition, he won the Richmond Open that year. He also won the Los Angeles Open two years later. Both were retroactively labeled PGA Tour events.

He appeared in the movie The Caddy with Jerry Lewis and Dean Martin. He also featured in Shoot Yourself Some Golf with Ronald Reagan and Jane Wyman. He was married to silent film star Viola Dana from 1930 to 1945.

== Professional wins (5) ==
=== PGA Tour wins (2) ===
- 1936 Richmond Open
- 1938 Los Angeles Open

=== Other wins (3) ===
this list may be incomplete

- 1927 Virginia Open
- 1934 Melbourne Centenary Open (Australia)
- 1937 San Francisco Matchplay Open

== Results in major championships ==
Tournament	1925	1926	1927	1928	1929
U.S. Open	59	T16	DQ		T38
The Open Championship					T13
PGA Championship					

Tournament	1930	1931	1932	1933	1934	1935	1936	1937	1938	1939
Masters Tournament	NYF	NYF	NYF	NYF		T51	T15	6	T8	T18
U.S. Open		WD			T43	2	T14	T28	T32	
The Open Championship										
PGA Championship						R16	2	R16	R32	R64

Tournament	1940	1941	1942	1943	1944	1945	1946	1947	1948	1949
Masters Tournament	T33	T14	12	NT	NT	NT	T25			
U.S. Open	CUT	CUT	NT	NT	NT	NT	CUT	T39	T48	T37
The Open Championship	NT	NT	NT	NT	NT	NT			CUT	
PGA Championship	R64	R64	R64	NT			R32	R64		R32

Top 10
Did not play

NYF = tournament not yet founded
NT = no tournament
DQ = disqualified
WD = withdrew
CUT = missed the half-way cut
R64, R32, R16, QF, SF = round in which player lost in PGA Championship match play
"T" indicates a tie for a place

=== Summary ===
Tournament	Wins	2nd	3rd	Top-5	Top-10	Top-25	Events	Cuts made
Masters Tournament	0	0	0	0	2	7	9	9
U.S. Open	0	1	0	1	1	3	16	11
The Open Championship	0	0	0	0	0	1	2	1
PGA Championship	0	1	0	1	3	6	11	11
Totals	0	2	0	2	6	17	38	32

- Most consecutive cuts made – 16 (1934 U.S. Open – 1940 Masters)
- Longest streak of top-10s – 2 (three times)
