= Oakmont Country Club =

Country club in Pennsylvania, U.S.

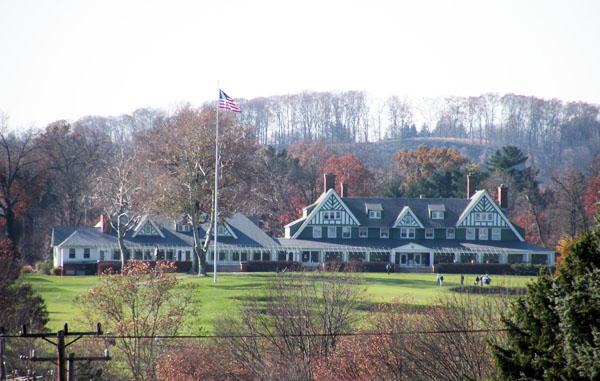
- Oakmont in November 2009

- Location within the United States Location within Pennsylvania
- 40.5261°N 79.8264°W

Club information
- Location: Plum and Oakmont, Pennsylvania, U.S.
- Elevation: 1,000 feet (305 m)
- Established: 1903; 123 years ago
- Type: Private
- Total holes: 18
- Greens: Poa annua
- Fairways: Bentgrass, Poa annua
- Website: oakmont-countryclub
- Designed by: Henry Fownes (1904), Gil Hanse & Jim Wagner (2023-2024 restoration)
- Par: 71 (70 for U.S. Open since 2007)
- Length: 7,431 yards (6,795 m)
- Course rating: 77.7
- Slope rating: 142
- Course record: 63 – Johnny Miller (1973 U.S. Open)
- Oakmont Country Club
- U.S. National Register of Historic Places
- U.S. National Historic Landmark
- Pittsburgh Landmark – PHLF
- Location within Pennsylvania
- Nearest city: Plum and Oakmont, Pennsylvania, U.S.
- Built: 1903
- Architect: Fownes, Henry C.; Stotz, Edward
- Architectural style: Tudor Revival
- NRHP reference No.: 84003090

Significant dates
- Added to NRHP: August 17, 1984
- Designated NHL: June 30, 1987
- Designated PHLF: 1985

Oakmont Country Club is a country club in Plum and Oakmont, Pennsylvania, United States. Established in 1903, the club predominantly lies in the borough of Plum, in the East Hills suburbs of Pittsburgh. Its golf course is regarded as the "oldest top-ranked golf course in the United States" and was designated a National Historic Landmark in 1987. The Pennsylvania Turnpike separates seven holes (two through eight) from the rest of the layout. Oakmont most recently hosted its record tenth U.S. Open in 2025.

== Oakmont's course ==
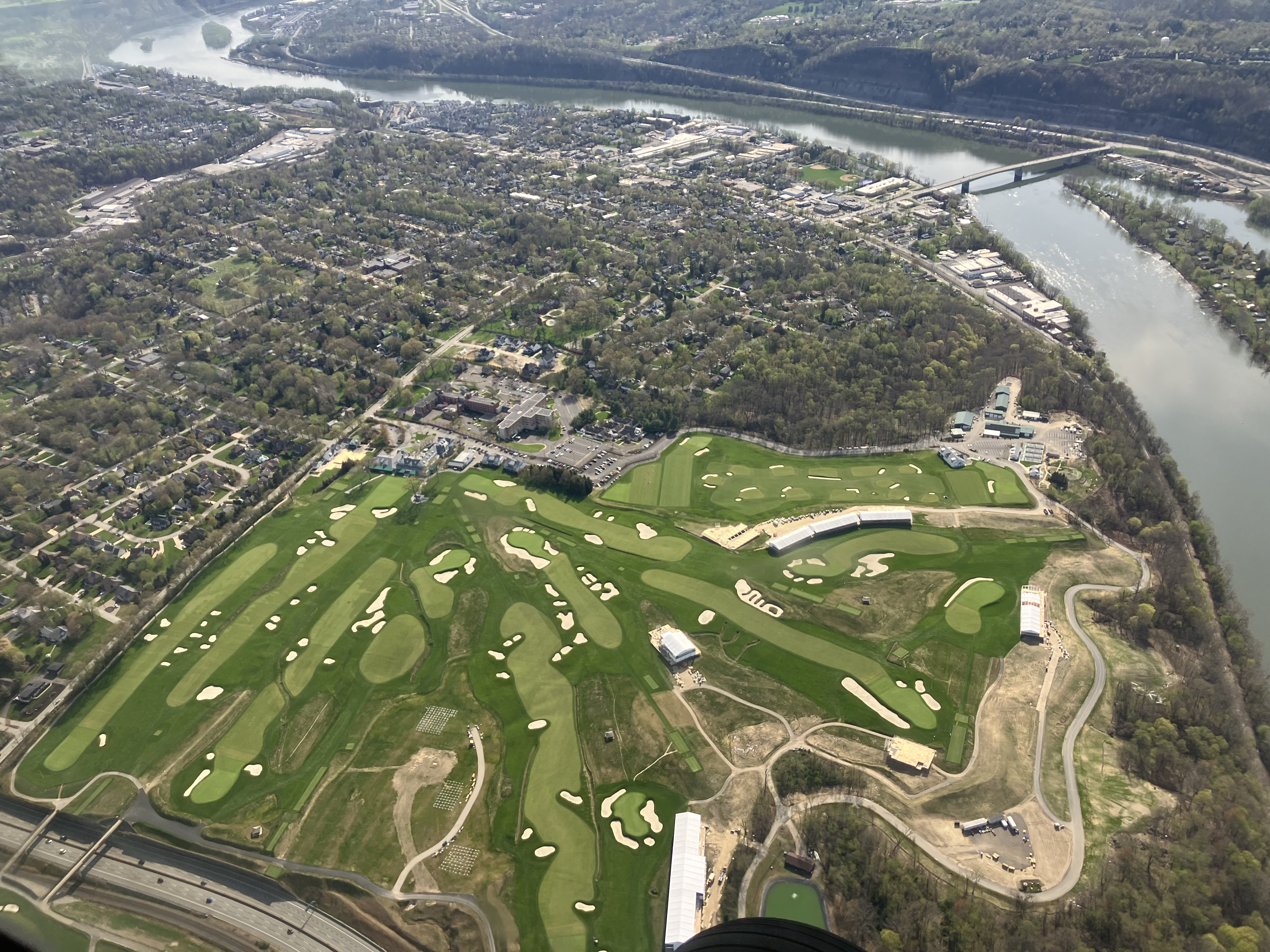
A portion of the club from 1500 feet above the surface

The course, the only design by Henry Fownes, opened in 1903. With a crew of 150 men and under two dozen mule teams, Henry Fownes spent a year building Oakmont on old farmland, ideal for a links-style course.

The course straddles the Allegheny River Valley and uniquely has virtually no water hazards and, since 2007, almost no trees. With a USGA course rating of 77.5 and 168 bunkers, it is generally regarded in the golf community as one of the most difficult in the United States. It features large, extremely fast, and undulating greens, while the rough is tough and thick. All of the greens are original save for the eighth, which was moved several yards to the left to make way for the Pennsylvania Turnpike in the late 1940s. Originally a links course, trees were added in the 1950s-1960s. Most were removed beginning after the 1994 U.S. Open, with between 5,000 and 8,000 eliminated during a 2007 renovation alone. Greens are planted with Poa annua, and par for members is 71.

The course is also noted for its slope. In particular, on holes one, three, 10, and 12, the greens pitch away from the fairway.

One of Oakmont's most famous hazards is the Church Pews bunker that comes into play on the third and fourth holes. The bunker measures approximately 100 by 40 yards (91 by 37 m) and features 13 grass-covered traversing ridges that resemble church pews.

For many years, Oakmont's bunkers were groomed with a rake with wider than normal tines, creating deep furrows. The rakes were last used in U.S. Open competition in 1962 and eliminated from the club in 1964.

== Rankings ==
The course has been consistently ranked as one of the five best by Golf Digest 100 Greatest Golf Courses in America. In 2007, Oakmont was placed in fifth by the magazine. It is one of only a few courses ranked in the top 10 every year of the publication's history. The top 50 toughest courses ranks Oakmont also at number five, while GolfLink.com ranks it third overall.

== Oakmont scorecard ==
Tee	Rating/Slope	1	2	3	4	5	6	7	8	9	Out	10	11	12	13	14	15	16	17	18	In	Total
2025 U.S. Open		488	346	462	611	408	200	485	289 250	472	3,761 3,722	461	400	632	182	379	507	236	312	502	3,611	7,372 7,333
Par	2025 U.S. Open	4	4	4	5	4	3	4	3	4	35	4	4	5	3	4	4	3	4	4	35	70
Championship	M:77.7 / 142	482	346	467	612	410	203	487	293	475	3,775	460	398	663	186	381	509	237	317	505	3,656	7,431
Green	M:76.3 / 140	465	345	460	560	405	195	435	250	475	3,590	460	380	615	175	380	485	230	315	500	3,540	7,130
Blue	M:74.2 / 136 W:80.4 / 145	445	335	415	535	370	180	390	225	460	3,355	445	355	590	155	360	460	210	295	450	3,320	6,675
White	M:72.3 / 131 W:77.9 / 139	420	320	390	485	320	150	370	210	445	3,110	430	295	570	140	345	435	200	265	420	3,100	6,210
Brown	M:70.0 / 128 W:74.9 / 135	410	316	340	465	315	150	355	170	380	2,900	390	295	540	130	280	415	140	250	365	2,805	5,705
Gold	M:67.6 / 126 W:72.0 / 129	375	270	340	425	275	105	270	170	380	2,610	390	270	470	130	270	345	135	240	365	2,615	5,225
Fairway Tees	M:63.9 / 115 W:67.9 / 121	337	221	272	352	219	104	238	101	351	2,195	341	207	434	113	230	332	128	176	296	2,257	4,452
Par		4	4	4	5	4	3	4	3	5	36	4	4	5	3	4	4	3	4	4	35	71
SI	Men's	5	9	1	7	11	17	3	13	15		4	16	2	18	12	8	14	10	6
SI	Women's	9	7	3	5	11	13	15	17	1		10	8	4	6	12	14	16	18	2

A hole-by-hole course map from Golf Magazine (June 2007) can be viewed here Flyovers of the holes can be seen here

== Major championships ==
Oakmont has hosted the U.S. Open 10 times, more than any other course, most recently in 2025. It has also hosted three PGA Championships, six U.S. Amateurs, two U.S. Women's Opens, and three NCAA men's championships (1916, 1930, 1937).

Year	Major	Winner	Winning score	Winner's share ($)
2025	U.S. Open (10)	(United States) J. J. Spaun	279 (–1)	4,300,000
2021	U.S. Amateur (6)	(United States) James Piot	2 & 1	—N/a
2016	U.S. Open (9)	(United States) Dustin Johnson	276 (–4)	1,800,000
2010	U.S. Women's Open (2)	(United States) Paula Creamer	281 (–3)	585,000
2007	U.S. Open (8)	(Argentina) Ángel Cabrera	285 (+5)	1,260,000
2003	U.S. Amateur (5)	(Australia) Nick Flanagan	37th Hole	—N/a
1994	U.S. Open (7)	(South Africa) Ernie Els (1st)	279 (–5), Playoff	320,000
1992	U.S. Women's Open	(United States) Patty Sheehan (1st)	280 (–4), Playoff	130,000
1983	U.S. Open (6)	(United States) Larry Nelson	280 (–4)	72,000
1978	PGA Championship (3)	(United States) John Mahaffey	276 (–8), Playoff	50,000
1973	U.S. Open (5)	(United States) Johnny Miller	279 (–5)	35,000
1969	U.S. Amateur (4)	(United States) Steve Melnyk	286	—N/a
1962	U.S. Open (4)	(United States) Jack Nicklaus (1st)	283 (–1), Playoff	17,500
1953	U.S. Open (3)	(United States) Ben Hogan (4th)	283 (–5)	5,000
1951	PGA Championship (2)	(United States) Sam Snead (3rd)	7 & 6	3,500
1938	U.S. Amateur (3)	(United States) Willie Turnesa (1st)	8 & 7	—N/a
1935	U.S. Open (2)	(United States) Sam Parks Jr.	299 (+11)	1,000
1927	U.S. Open	(Scotland) (United States) Tommy Armour	301 (+13), Playoff	500
1925	U.S. Amateur (2)	(United States) Bobby Jones (3rd)	8 & 7	—N/a
1922	PGA Championship	(United States) Gene Sarazen (1st)	4 & 3	500
1919	U.S. Amateur	(United States) Davidson Herron	5 & 4	—N/a

=== U.S. Opens ===
==== 1927 ====
The first U.S. Open at Oakmont was won by Tommy Armour, who defeated Harry Cooper in an 18-hole Friday playoff. Their 72-hole score was 301 (+13); the par-72 course played to 6,929 yards (6,336 m) in 1927 (the first and ninth holes were both par 5). The average score for the field was 78.6 (+ 6.6) and the field recorded just 2 rounds under par. The total purse of prize money was $800 ($14,828 in 2025 dollars).

==== 1935 ====
Won by Sam Parks Jr. at 11 strokes over par. The par 72 course played to 6,981 yards (6,383 m) in 1935 and the average score for the field was 80.55 (+ 8.55) and the field recorded 3 rounds under par. The total purse of prize money was $5,000 ($117,415 in 2025 dollars) with a winner's share of $1,000 ($23,483 in 2025 dollars).

==== 1953 ====
Ben Hogan won the second of his three straight majors in 1953 at Oakmont by six strokes, coming in at five under par.

Scheduling conflicts made it impossible to win all four majors that year, as the late rounds of the PGA Championship, then a match play event, and the mandatory 36-hole qualifier directly preceding the British Open overlapped in early July. Hogan won The Masters by five strokes and the British Open at Carnoustie by four strokes. The par-72 Oakmont course played at 6,916 yards (6,324 m) in 1953, and the average score for the field was 77.12 (+ 5.12); the field recorded 20 rounds under par. The purse was $14,900 and the champion earned $5,000 ($179,300 and $60,168 in 2025 dollars).

==== 1962 ====
At the 1962 U.S. Open, an up-and-coming 22-year-old named Jack Nicklaus defeated the world's top player at the time, the 33-year-old Arnold Palmer, in a Sunday playoff round in Palmer's "backyard".

Both competitors had completed the 72 holes with a 283 (–1). It was the first professional victory for Nicklaus, and the first of his 18 professional majors. Palmer won the next major, the 1962 British Open, and his fourth Masters in 1964, but never another U.S. Open. In 1962, par was reduced by a stroke to 71 (the first hole became a par-4) and the course length was slightly reduced to 6,893 yards (6,303 m); the average score for the field was 75.86 (+ 4.86) and the field recorded 19 rounds under par. The purse was $81,600 and the champion earned $17,500 ($868,515 and $186,262 in 2025 dollars).

==== 1973 ====
Johnny Miller shot a final round 63 (–8) to set a record low score at a U.S. Open, and finished at 279 (–5) to win by one stroke in 1973.

Following an overnight rainstorm, Miller entered the final round in 12th place at three-over, six strokes behind the four co-leaders. Miller had carded a disappointing five-over 76 on Saturday, and his tee time on Sunday was about an hour ahead of the final pairing, which included Arnold Palmer.

Miller birdied the first four holes and hit all 18 greens in regulation, and used only 29 putts. Miller and four others were the only ones to break par during the final round in 1973. The par 71 course played at 6,921 yards (6,329 m) and the average score for the field was 75.45 (+ 4.45) and the field recorded 40 rounds under par. The purse was $219,400 and the champion earned $35,000 ($1.59 million and $253,842 in 2025 dollars).

Miller's low score (9 birdies with 1 bogey) led the USGA to set up the course at the following year's championship, now known as The Massacre at Winged Foot, in an extremely challenging manner; Hale Irwin's winning score in 1974 was seven strokes over par.

===== Johnny Miller's 63 =====
Club selection and results - June 17, 1973

Hole	Yards	Par	Club selections	Score	Result	To par
1	469	4	Driver, 3-iron to 5 feet	3	birdie	–1
2	343	4	Driver, 9-iron to 1 foot	3	birdie	–2
3	425	4	Driver, 5-iron to 25 feet	3	birdie	–3
4	549	5	Driver, 3-wood, bunker shot to 6 inches	4	birdie	–4
5	379	4	Driver, 6-iron to 25 feet, 2 putts	4	par	–4
6	195	3	3-iron to 25 feet, 2 putts	3	par	–4
7	395	4	Driver, 9-iron to 6 feet, 2 putts	4	par	–4
8	244	3	4-wood to 30 feet, 3 putts	4	bogey	–3
9	480	5	Driver, 2-iron to 40 feet, 2 putts	4	birdie	–4
Out	3,479	36		32		–4
10	462	4	Driver, 5-iron to 25 feet, 2 putts	4	par	–4
11	371	4	Driver, wedge to 14 feet	3	birdie	–5
12	603	5	Driver, 7-iron, 4-iron to 15 feet	4	birdie	–6
13	185	3	4-iron to 5 feet	2	birdie	–7
14	360	4	Driver, wedge to 12 feet, 2 putts	4	par	–7
15	453	4	Driver, 4-iron to 10 feet	3	birdie	–8
16	230	3	2-iron to 45 feet, 2 putts	3	par	–8
17	322	4	1-iron, wedge to 10 feet, 2 putts	4	par	–8
18	456	4	Driver, 5-iron to 20 feet, 2 putts	4	par	–8
In	3,442	35		31		–4
Total	6,921	71		63		–8

==== 1983 ====
In 1983, Larry Nelson was at 148 (+6) after the first two rounds. He then established the 36-hole record at the U.S. Open when he finished 65–67 to finish at 280 (–4), one stroke ahead of runner-up and defending champion Tom Watson. Nelson's two-round total of 132 (–10) broke the 51-year-old record by four shots, established by Gene Sarazen in 1932. Nelson's record, although not receiving level acclaim to Miller's 63 finish, stood until 2011 when Rory McIlroy broke it. The par 71 course played at 6,972 yards (6,375 m) in 1983, and the average score for the field was 76.13 (+ 5.13), and the field recorded 27 rounds under par. The purse was $506,184 and the champion earned $72,000 ($1.64 million and $232,743 in 2025 dollars).

==== 1994 ====
In 1994, a 24-year-old Ernie Els outlasted Loren Roberts and Colin Montgomerie in another Monday playoff round to capture the U.S. Open, his first major and first victory in the U.S. It was the first three-way playoff at the U.S. Open since 1963.

The three in the playoff completed the four rounds at 279 (–5), but all were well over par early in the playoff round, played in oppressive heat and humidity, as temperatures approached 100 °F (38 °C). Montgomerie shot a 42 on the front nine, ending at 78 (+7) and was eliminated. However, Els and Roberts were tied at 3-over 74, with Roberts missing a short putt on the 18th hole to win outright, so they kept playing as a sudden-death playoff. On the second extra hole, Roberts bogeyed, and Els made par to win the championship. The par 71 course played at 6,946 yards (6,351 m) in 1994, and the average score for the field was 74.25 (+ 3.25); the field recorded 62 rounds under par. The purse was $1.75 million and the champion earned $320,000 ($3.8 million and $695,106 in 2025 dollars).

==== 2007 ====
Ángel Cabrera of Argentina shot 285 (+5) in 2007, one stroke ahead of runners-up Tiger Woods and Jim Furyk.

A course renovation had deepened the bunkers and removed over 4,000 trees that had been planted mostly in the 1960s, returning the course to its original links-style appearance. The course was lengthened to 7,230 yards (6,611 m) and par was reduced by a stroke to 70, as the uphill 9th hole became a par-4. The par-3 8th hole played at 300 yards (274 m) in Round 4, the par-5 12th hole at over 660 yards (604 m), and the par-4 15th at 500 yards (457 m). The average score for the field in 2007 was 75.72 (+ 5.72), with every hole averaging an over-par score. The field recorded just 8 rounds under par, only two per round. Cabrera had two of these sub-par rounds, shooting a 69 (-1) on Thursday and Sunday.

The weather was much more agreeable than in 1994: the high temperatures were 75–80 °F (24–27 °C) for the first three rounds and 90 °F (32 °C) for the final round, and there were no weather delays in any of the rounds. The total purse was $7.0 million and the champion earned $1.26 million ($10.9 million and $1.96 million in 2025 dollars).

==== 2016 ====
The club hosted the U.S. Open for a record ninth time in 2016, and Dustin Johnson shot 276 (–4) to win his first major title by three strokes.

==== 2025 ====
The club hosted the U.S. Open for a tenth time in 2025, and J. J. Spaun shot 279 (–1) to win his first major title by two strokes.

==== 2033 ====
Oakmont is scheduled to host its eleventh U.S. Open in 2033.

==== 2042 ====
Oakmont is scheduled to host its twelfth U.S. Open in 2042.

== Quotes from notable golfers ==
- USGA Sr. Director of Rules and Competitions Mike Davis: "There's a reason [the U.S. Open is] coming back to Oakmont. This really is the gold standard for championship golf. It doesn't get any better than Oakmont."
- Lee Trevino: "There's only one course in the country where you could step out right now — right now — and play the U.S. Open, and that's Oakmont."
- Phil Mickelson: "It's really a neat, special place."
- Johnny Miller: "It's probably the best course in the world . . . This is the greatest course I've ever played."

On Oakmont's greens:

- Tiger Woods:"That golf course is going to be one of the toughest tests that we've ever played in a U.S. Open, especially if it's dry, it will be unreal because those greens are so severe."
- Arnold Palmer: "You can hit 72 greens [in regulation] in the Open at Oakmont and not come close to winning."
- Rocco Mediate said of the greens that they are "almost impossible"
- Sam Snead once quipped that he tried to mark his ball on one of Oakmont's greens but the coin slid off.
- Lee Trevino claimed every time he two-putted at Oakmont, he knew he was passing somebody on the leader board.
- Johnny Miller said that Oakmont's are the greatest greens for testing a player's ability to putt.
- USGA Sr. Director Mike Davis: "[Oakmont's greens are the] scariest in golf."

== Stimpmeter ==
The stimpmeter, a device for measuring the speed of greens, was developed by Edward Stimpson (1904–1985), an accomplished amateur player from Massachusetts, shortly after attending the 1935 U.S. Open at Oakmont.

== See also ==
- List of National Historic Landmarks in Pennsylvania
- National Register of Historic Places listings in Allegheny County, Pennsylvania
