= 1935 U.S. Open (golf) =

Tournament information
- Dates: June 6–8, 1935
- Location: Oakmont, Pennsylvania; 40.526°N 79.827°W
- Course: Oakmont Country Club
- Organized by: USGA
- Tour: PGA Tour
- Format: Stroke play − 72 holes

Statistics
- Par: 72
- Length: 6,981 yards (6,383 m)
- Field: 159 players, 66 after cut
- Cut: 161 (+17)
- Prize fund: $5,000
- Winner's share: $1,000

Champion
- (United States) Sam Parks Jr.
- 299 (+11)

Location map
- Location in the United States Location in Pennsylvania

The 1935 U.S. Open was the 39th U.S. Open, held June 6–8 at Oakmont Country Club in Oakmont, Pennsylvania, a suburb northeast of Pittsburgh. Sam Parks Jr., a 25-year-old club pro at nearby South Hills Country Club with no prior tournament wins, prevailed by two strokes in difficult scoring conditions for his only major title. The purse was $5,000 and the winner's share was $1,000.

Jimmy Thomson owned the 36-hole lead after consecutive rounds of 73, despite severe weather that caused scores to soar. Sam Parks trailed by four, but in the third round he recorded a 60-foot (18 m) chip-in for eagle to tie Thomson, who shot a 77. The weather only got worse during the final round, and Thomson could do no better than a 78. Parks, however, shot a 76 for a two-stroke victory. Walter Hagen briefly led during the final round, but four consecutive bogeys knocked him back to third; it was the last time that he contended in a major championship. Scoring conditions were so difficult that no player in contention broke 75 and 73 was the lowest score of the round.

Parks was certainly helped by his preparation for the tournament. Every day for a month, he stopped at Oakmont to play a practice round before returning to his own club. This practice paid off particularly on Oakmont's notoriously difficult greens, where he three-putted just twice in 72 holes. His winning score of 299 was the highest since 1927, also at Oakmont, and he was the only player to break 300. Born in nearby Bellevue, Parks was an alumnus of the University of Pittsburgh, where he had been captain of the golf team.

The field of 159 included six entrants from Japan and one from South Africa; the rest from 31 states and the District of Columbia. For the first time, a Japanese player made the cut at the Open. Kanekichi Nakamura was part of a tour of the U.S. by Japanese golfers and finished in 58th at 325. Chris Brinke captured low-amateur honors in 32nd place at 315, a stroke ahead of 1933 champion Johnny Goodman.

Oakmont had previously hosted the U.S. Open in 1927, the PGA Championship in 1922, and the U.S. Amateur in 1919 and 1925.

The Stimpmeter was inspired by the fast greens of this Open. Edward Stimpson Sr. (1904–1985), the Massachusetts amateur champion and a former captain of the Harvard golf team, devised a simple device and method to accurately measure the speed of greens.

== Course layout ==
Hole	1	2	3	4	5	6	7	8	9	Out	10	11	12	13	14	15	16	17	18	In	Total
Yards	482	363	428	536	386	187	395	253	477	3,507	461	395	621	164	349	475	234	302	473	3,474	6,981
Par	5	4	4	5	4	3	4	3	5	37	4	4	5	3	4	4	3	4	4	35	72

Lengths of the course for previous major championships:

- 6,965 yards (6,369 m), par 72 - 1927 U.S. Open
- 6,707 yards (6,133 m), par 74 - 1922 PGA Championship

== Round summaries ==
=== First round ===
Thursday, June 6, 1935

Place	Player	Score	To par
1	(United States) Butch Krueger	71	−1
2	(United States) Roland MacKenzie	72	E
T3	(United States) Herman Barron	73	+1
T3	(United States) Cliff Spencer	73	+1
T3	(United States) Horton Smith	73	+1
T3	(United States) Jimmy Thomson	73	+1
T7	(United States) Tommy Armour	74	+2
T7	(United States) Ed Dudley	74	+2
T7	(United States) Jim Foulis	74	+2
T7	(United States) Macdonald Smith	74	+2

=== Second round ===
Friday, June 7, 1935

Place	Player	Score	To par
1	(United States) Jimmy Thomson	73-73=146	+2
2	(United States) Butch Krueger	71-77=148	+4
3	(United States) Gene Sarazen	75-74=149	+5
4	(United States) Sam Parks Jr.	77-73=150	+6
T5	(United States) Al Espinosa	75-76=151	+7
T5	(United States) Denny Shute	78-73=151	+7
T5	(United States) Ted Turner	80-71=151	+7
T8	(United States) Herman Barron	73-79=152	+8
T8	(United States) Mortie Dutra	75-77=152	+8
T8	(United States) Vincent Eldred	75-77=152	+8
T8	(United States) Ray Mangrum	76-76=152	+8
T8	(United States) Horton Smith	73-79=152	+8

=== Third round ===
Saturday, June 8, 1935 (morning)

Place	Player	Score	To par
T1	(United States) Sam Parks Jr.	77-73-73=223	+7
T1	(United States) Jimmy Thomson	73-73-77=223	+7
3	(United States) Ray Mangrum	76-76-72=224	+8
T4	(United States) Walter Hagen	77-76-73=226	+10
T4	(United States) Butch Krueger	71-77-78=226	+10
T6	(United States) Henry Picard	79-78-70=227	+11
T6	(United States) Gene Sarazen	75-74-78=227	+11
T6	(United States) Denny Shute	78-73-76=227	+11
T9	(United States) Vincent Eldred	75-75-77=229	+13
T9	(United States) Al Espinosa	75-76-78=229	+13
T9	(United States) Dick Metz	77-76-76=229	+13

=== Final round ===
Saturday, June 8, 1935 (afternoon)

Place	Player	Score	To par	Money ($)
1	(United States) Sam Parks Jr.	77-73-73-76=299	+11	1,000
2	(United States) Jimmy Thomson	73-73-77-78=301	+13	750
3	(United States) Walter Hagen	77-76-73-76=302	+14	650
T4	(United States) Ray Mangrum	76-76-72-79=303	+15	500
T4	(United States) Denny Shute	78-73-76-76=303	+15	500
T6	(United States) Butch Krueger	71-77-78-80=306	+18	218
T6	(United States) Henry Picard	79-78-70-79=306	+18	218
T6	(United States) Gene Sarazen	75-74-78-79=306	+18	218
T6	(United States) Horton Smith	73-79-79-75=306	+18	218
T10	(United States) Dick Metz	77-76-76-78=307	+19	95
T10	(United States) Paul Runyan	76-77-79-75=307	+19	95

==== Scorecard ====
Hole	1	2	3	4	5	6	7	8	9	10	11	12	13	14	15	16	17	18
Par	5	4	4	5	4	3	4	3	5	4	4	5	3	4	4	3	4	4
(United States) Parks	+6	+7	+8	+9	+9	+9	+9	+9	+8	+8	+8	+8	+8	+8	+9	+10	+10	+11
(Scotland) (United States) Thomson	+7	+7	+6	+5	+6	+7	+8	+10	+9	+9	+9	+9	+9	+10	+11	+12	+12	+13
(United States) Hagen	+9	+9	+9	+8	+9	+11	+11	+11	+10	+11	+12	+13	+14	+14	+14	+15	+14	+14
(United States) Shute	+11	+12	+13	+13	+14	+14	+14	+14	+13	+13	+13	+14	+14	+14	+13	+15	+15	+15

Cumulative tournament scores, relative to par

Birdie	Bogey	Double bogey
