= 1951 PGA Championship =

Tournament information
- Dates: June 27 – July 3, 1951
- Location: Oakmont, Pennsylvania, U.S. 40.526°N 79.827°W
- Course: Oakmont Country Club
- Organized by: PGA of America
- Tour: PGA Tour
- Format: Match play - 6 rounds

Statistics
- Par: 72
- Length: 6,882 yards (6,293 m)
- Field: 140 players, 64 to match play
- Cut: 154 (+10), playoff
- Prize fund: $17,700
- Winner's share: $3,500

Champion
- (United States) Sam Snead
- def. Walter Burkemo, 7 and 6
- Location in the United States Location in Pennsylvania

The 1951 PGA Championship was the 33rd PGA Championship, held June 27 to July 3 at Oakmont Country Club in Oakmont, Pennsylvania, a suburb northeast of Pittsburgh. Sam Snead won the match play championship, 7 and 6, over Walter Burkemo in the Tuesday final; the winner's share was $3,500, and the runner-up's was $1,500.

It marked the first time the PGA Championship returned to a venue; Oakmont had hosted in 1922 (at the time, it had also hosted two U.S. Opens and three U.S. Amateurs). It was Snead's third and final win in the PGA Championship and the fifth of his seven major titles. At age 39, he was the oldest at the time to win the PGA Championship, passing his old record of two years earlier. Burkemo won the title in 1953 and was runner-up again in 1954.

Defending champion Chandler Harper lost in the first round to Jim Turnesa in a match that went to 23 holes. Turnesa, the runner-up to Snead in 1942, won the title the following year in 1952 and displaced Snead as the oldest champion by a few months.

Snead's win was the last by a former champion for twenty years until Jack Nicklaus won his second PGA Championship in 1971.

Claude Harmon, Lloyd Mangrum, and Pete Cooper tied for the lowest score in the stroke play qualifier at 142 (−2). Harmon won the $250 medalist prize on the third hole of a sudden-death playoff.

The British Open in 1951 was held in the first week of July in Northern Ireland. Its mandatory two-day qualifier was held on the same days as the PGA's semifinals and finals, which prevented participation in both events.

== Format ==
The match play format at the PGA Championship in 1951 called for 12 rounds (216 holes) in seven days:

- Wednesday and Thursday – 36-hole stroke play qualifier, 18 holes per day;
  - defending champion Chandler Harper and top 63 professionals advanced to match play
- Friday – first two rounds, 18 holes each
- Saturday – third round – 36 holes
- Sunday – quarterfinals – 36 holes
- Monday – semifinals – 36 holes
- Tuesday – final – 36 holes

== Final results ==
Place	Player	Money ($)
1	(United States) Sam Snead	3,500
2	(United States) Walter Burkemo	1,500
T3	(United States) Charlie Bassler	750
T3	(United States) Ellsworth Vines	750
T5	(United States) Al Brosch	500
T5	(United States) Johnny Bulla	500
T5	(United States) Jack Burke Jr.	500
T5	(United States) Reggie Myles	500

== Final eight bracket ==
Quarter-finals; July 1
Sam Snead	2&1
Jack Burke Jr.
Charlie Bassler	1up
Al Brosch
Walter Burkemo	1up
Reggie Myles
Ellsworth Vines	1up
Johnny Bulla

Semi-finals; July 2
Sam Snead	9&8
Charlie Bassler
Walter Burkemo	37h
Ellsworth Vines

Finals; July 3
Sam Snead	7&6
Walter Burkemo

== Final match scorecards ==
Morning

Hole	1	2	3	4	5	6	7	8	9	10	11	12	13	14	15	16	17	18
Par	5	4	4	5	4	3	4	3	5	4	4	5	3	4	4	3	4	4
(United States) Snead	3	4	4	4	3	3	4	4	5	4	4	5	3	4	4	3	4	5
(United States) Burkemo	4	5	4	5	6	4	4	4	5	4	3	5	4	3	4	4	3	4
Leader	S1	S2	S2	S3	S4	S5	S5	S5	S5	S5	S4	S4	S5	S4	S4	S5	S4	S3

Afternoon

Hole	1	2	3	4	5	6	7	8	9	10	11	12	13	14	15	16	17	18
Par	5	4	4	5	4	3	4	3	5	4	4	5	3	4	4	3	4	4
(United States) Snead	4	3	4	5	4	3	4	3	5	4	4	5	Snead wins 7 and 6					
(United States) Burkemo	5	4	5	4	4	3	5	4	4	5	4	5	Snead wins 7 and 6					
Leader	S4	S5	S6	S5	S5	S5	S6	S7	S6	S7	S7	S7	Snead wins 7 and 6					

Eagle	Birdie	Bogey	Double bogey
