= 1927 U.S. Open (golf) =

Coordinates: 40.526°N 79.827°W

Tournament information
- Dates: June 14–17, 1927
- Location: Oakmont, Pennsylvania
- Course: Oakmont Country Club
- Organized by: USGA
- Format: Stroke play − 72 holes

Statistics
- Par: 72
- Length: 6,965 yards (6,369 m)
- Field: 148 players, 62 after cut
- Cut: 163 (+19)
- Prize fund: $2,000
- Winner's share: $500

Champion
- (United States) Tommy Armour
- 301 (+13), playoff

Location in the United States
Location in Pennsylvania

The 1927 U.S. Open was the 31st U.S. Open, held June 14–17 at Oakmont Country Club in Oakmont, Pennsylvania, a suburb northeast of Pittsburgh. Tommy Armour defeated Harry Cooper in an 18-hole playoff to win the first of his three major titles.

== Tournament summary ==
The surprise second round leader was amateur Jimmy Johnston, who won the U.S. Amateur two years later in 1929. In the third round on Thursday morning, he suffered two double bogeys on the front-nine, carded an 87 (+15), and finished in 19th place. Gene Sarazen, Walter Hagen, Bill Mehlhorn, and Emmet French were all in contention in the final round, but only French managed to break 40 on the back nine. Tommy Armour shot a final round 76 and 301 total, while Harry Cooper shot 77. Armour needed a 10-foot (3 m) putt for birdie on the par-4 18th to tie Cooper and force a playoff.

Both players were tied after nine holes of the Friday playoff, even though they only halved one hole. Cooper then took a two-shot lead, but an Armour birdie at 13 and a Cooper bogey at 15 brought the match to all square. On the 16th, Cooper found a bunker off the tee and recorded a double bogey, while Armour made par to gain a two-stroke advantage did not relinquish. Armour finished with a 76 to Cooper's 79.

Armour's winning score of 301 was the highest since 1919, and the last time the winning score exceeded 300 strokes. Only one round under 70 was recorded, Al Espinosa's 69 in the final round. After Armour, no foreign-born player won the U.S. Open for another 38 years, until Gary Player in 1965. England's Ted Ray, the 1920 champion, played in his first Open since his win; it would also be his last. The 12th hole at Oakmont measured 621 yards (568 m), the longest in U.S. Open history until 1955.

While Armour won two more majors, Cooper never won one. His 31 PGA Tour victories are the most by a player without a major win, and he is often cited as the "best player to never win a major."

Defending champion Bobby Jones and Eddie Jones shared low-amateur honors and tied for eleventh. It was the only time in his eleven U.S. Open appearances that Bobby Jones finished outside the top ten.

This was the first U.S. Open held at Oakmont, which hosted its ninth in 2016. It has also hosted three PGA Championships; the first in 1922 was a match play event won by Gene Sarazen.

This was the last U.S. Open to commence on Tuesday; the following year the first round was scheduled for Thursday.

== Round summaries ==
=== First round ===
Tuesday, June 14, 1927

Place	Player	Score	To par
T1	(Scotland) Harry Hampton	73	+1
T1	(United States) Jimmy Johnston (a)	73	+1
T3	(United States) Harry Cooper	74	+2
T3	(United States) Gene Sarazen	74	+2
T5	(United States) Emmet French	75	+3
T5	(United States) Bill Mehlhorn	75	+3
T5	(United States) Larry Nabboltz	75	+3
T8	(United States) Bobby Jones (a)	76	+4
T8	(Jersey) Ted Ray	76	+4
T10	(Scotland) Bobby Cruickshank	77	+5
T10	(United States) Walter Hagen	77	+5
T10	(United States) P.O. Hart	77	+5
T10	(Scotland) Bob MacDonald	77	+5

=== Second round ===
Wednesday, June 15, 1927

Place	Player	Score	To par
1	(United States) Jimmy Johnston (a)	73-74=147	+3
2	(United States) Gene Sarazen	74-74=148	+4
3	(United States) Tommy Armour	78-71=149	+5
T4	(United States) Harry Cooper	74-76=150	+6
T4	(United States) Walter Hagen	77-73=150	+6
6	(Scotland) Harry Hampton	73-78=151	+7
T7	(United States) Fred Baroni	80-72=152	+8
T7	(United States) Leo Diegel	78-74=152	+8
T7	(United States) Bill Mehlhorn	75-77=152	+8
T10	(England) Jim Barnes	78-75=153	+9
T10	(England) Archie Compston	79-74=153	+9
T10	(United States) Bobby Jones (a)	76-77=153	+9
T10	(United States) Eddie Loos	78-75=153	+9

=== Third round ===
Thursday, June 16, 1927 (morning)

Place	Player	Score	To par
1	(United States) Harry Cooper	74-76-74=224	+8
2	(United States) Tommy Armour	78-71-76=225	+9
3	(United States) Walter Hagen	77-73-76=226	+10
4	(United States) Gene Sarazen	74-74-80=228	+12
5	(England) Archie Compston	79-74-76=229	+13
T6	(Scotland) Bobby Cruickshank	77-78-76=231	+15
T6	(United States) Emmet French	75-79-77=231	+15
T6	(Scotland) Harry Hampton	73-78-80=231	+15
T9	(United States) Leo Diegel	78-74-80=232	+16
T9	(United States) Johnny Farrell	81-73-78=232	+16
T9	(United States) Eddie Loos	78-75-79=232	+16
T9	(United States) Bill Mehlhorn	75-77-80=232	+16

=== Final round ===
Thursday, June 16, 1927 (afternoon)

Place	Player	Score	To par	Money ($)
T1	(United States) Tommy Armour	78-71-76-76=301	+13	Playoff
T1	(United States) Harry Cooper	74-76-74-77=301	+13	Playoff
3	(United States) Gene Sarazen	74-74-80-74=302	+14	200
4	(United States) Emmet French	75-79-77-73=304	+16	150
5	(United States) Bill Mehlhorn	75-77-80-73=305	+17	100
6	(United States) Walter Hagen	77-73-76-81=307	+19	90
T7	(England) Archie Compston	79-74-76-79=308	+20	73
T7	(United States) Johnny Farrell	81-73-78-76=308	+20	73
T7	(United States) Johnny Golden	83-77-75-73=308	+20	73
T7	(Scotland) Harry Hampton	73-78-80-77=308	+20	73

=== Playoff ===
Friday, June 17, 1927

Place	Player	Score	To par	Money ($)
1	(United States) Tommy Armour	39-37=76	+4	500
2	(United States) Harry Cooper	39-40=79	+7	300

==== Scorecard ====
Hole	1	2	3	4	5	6	7	8	9	10	11	12	13	14	15	16	17	18
Par	5	4	4	5	4	3	4	3	5	4	4	5	3	4	4	3	4	4
(United States) Armour	−1	−1	E	E	+1	+1	+2	+2	+2	+3	+4	+4	+4	+5	+5	+5	+4	+4
(United States) Cooper	E	E	E	+1	+1	+2	+2	+3	+2	+2	+2	+2	+3	+4	+5	+7	+6	+7

Eagle	Birdie	Bogey	Double bogey	Triple bogey+
