= Charles Thorn (golfer) =

Scottish-American golfer (born 1887)

Personal information
- Full name: Charles Thorn
- Nationality: Scotland; United States
- Born: November 1877 Scotland
- Died: Unknown

Career
- Sport: Golf
- Status: Professional

Best results in major championships
- Masters Tournament: DNP
- PGA Championship: DNP
- U.S. Open: 7th: 1902
- The Open Championship: DNP

Charles Thorn (born November 1877) was a Scottish-American professional golfer. Thorn placed seventh in the 1902 U.S. Open.

== Early life ==
In 1879 at age 2, he emigrated with his family to the United States and became a naturalized American citizen. In 1900 he was boarding with the George Eke family at Shelter Island, New York.

== Golf career ==
=== Head professional jobs ===
By 1901 he was serving as the professional at Bedford Springs Hotel resort course in Bedford Springs, Pennsylvania, one of the oldest golf courses in the country. While there, he worked to improve the course by rebuilding greens and tee boxes and installing an irrigation system using the natural springs found in the area as a water source. In January 1919 Thorn was the head professional at Miami Beach Golf Club in the winter months and spent his summers working at Shinnecock Hills Golf Club on Long Island, New York.

=== Major championship tournaments ===
Thorn was in the field for the playing of the eighth U.S. Open in 1902. The golf tournament was held October 10–11, 1902, at Garden City Golf Club in Garden City, New York. Fellow Scotsman Laurie Auchterlonie established a new 72-hole U.S. Open scoring record to win his first U.S. Open title by six strokes ahead of Stewart Gardner and Walter Travis. Thorn's steady play resulted in a seventh-place finish.

Auchterlonie turned in a record-breaking performance on his way to the championship. He posted rounds of 78-78-74-77, becoming the first golfer in U.S. Open history to card four sub-80 rounds. His 307 total was six shots better than the previous tournament record, set by Harry Vardon in 1900. Stewart Gardner and amateur Walter Travis, the designer of Garden City Golf Club, both posted a 313 total to share second place.

The low scores were in large part due to the introduction of the Haskell golf ball, which soon replaced the gutta-percha ball as the prominent golf ball in use.
