= Garden City Country Club =

Golf course in Garden City, New York

- Interactive map of Garden City Country Club
- 40°43′15″N 73°40′5″W

Club information
- Location: Garden City, New York, U.S.
- Established: 1916
- Type: Private
- Total holes: 18
- Website: gardencitycountryclub.org
- Designer: Walter J. Travis
- Par: 70
- Length: 6,540 yards
- Course rating: 71.9
- Slope rating: 131

Garden City Country Club is a private country club in Garden City, New York, United States. Its 18-hole golf course, designed by Walter J. Travis, is one of three golf courses in the village. The clubhouse stands on the south side of Stewart Avenue, while the golf course extends across the Long Island Rail Road tracks just west of the Nassau Boulevard station. Established in 1916 by residents of Garden City Estates, the club emerged following the conversion of the nearby Salisbury Links from a public golf course into the private Cherry Valley Club.

== History ==
=== Background ===
The origins of the Garden City Country Club are closely tied to the conversion of Salisbury Links into the Cherry Valley Club, another private country club located in Garden City, New York. By 1915, the public Salisbury Links had become crowded with golfers. (Note: Salisbury Links was designed by Walter J. Travis in 1907 and was owned and operated by the Garden City Company. The golf course was open to the public and offered daily, weekly, monthly, and six-month fees as well as annual subscriptions for both men and women.) In February of the following year, the Garden City Company had staked out a new 18-hole golf course near the Meadow Brook Club to accommodate the growing demand for golf. (Note: The golf course opened in 1917 at the eastern end of Stewart Avenue and was developed by Joseph J. Lannin as part of a larger golf complex in Garden City. In the 1920s, four additional golf courses were built on the property, which became known as the Salisbury Country Club. The club struggled during the Great Depression. In the 1940s, Nassau County acquired the property and converted it into a public park. During the 1950s, the site of the original golf course was redeveloped for picnic grounds, athletic fields, and a lake. The park was renamed Eisenhower Park in 1969.)

Meanwhile, plans were developed to convert Salisbury Links into a private country club that would also have racquet sports and clay pigeon shooting as well as provide family-oriented social activities. Cherry Valley Club was organized in March 1916 and negotiated a lease with the Garden City Company for the property occupied by Salisbury Links. Conversion of the public golf course into a private club excluded some of the golfers who had previously played there and held subscriptions.

=== Establishment ===
Shortly after Cherry Valley Club was organized, a group of Garden City Estates residents led by Gage E. Tarbell began organizing a separate private country club. (Note: At the time, Tarbell was president of Garden City Estates and lived in a two-and-a-half-story house on the north side of Stewart Avenue, between Nassau Boulevard and Euston Road. Tarbell later became involved in the development of the Westchester Biltmore Country Club, whose golf courses were designed by Walter J. Travis.) On March 30, 1916, a preliminary meeting was held at the home of Frank M. Clute on Nassau Boulevard to discuss plans for a new country club featuring a clubhouse, an 18-hole golf course, and tennis and squash courts. Many of the attendees lived near Nassau Boulevard and had initially expected to join the Cherry Valley Club, but a disagreement over its proposed membership policies prompted them to organize a separate club. (Note: A dissatisfied prospective member, writing in the Brooklyn Eagle, criticized a proposed arrangement under which certain founding committee members would be exempt from the initiation fee.)

Locations of the three golf courses in Garden City, New York

An agreement was reached to lease about 90 acres (36 ha) west of Garden City Estates, on both sides of the Long Island Rail Road tracks and about a minute's walk from the Nassau Boulevard station. The site was located two blocks south of the former Nassau Boulevard Airfield, with undeveloped land to the south and farmland to the west. (Note: Sources describe the land as leased from the Horton Estate or a lease involving several adjoining tracts of land. According to a 1914 map published by E. Belcher-Hyde, the golf course site comprised several parcels, or portions thereof, listed under different names.) Subsequent meetings were held at Clute's home in early April to discuss the club's development, elect a board of governors, and prepare the articles of incorporation. Garden City Country Club, Inc. was incorporated in New York on April 7, 1916, with $30,000 in capital stock divided into 300 shares of $100 each.

The new club's name attracted criticism shortly after its formation. On April 11, 1916, the Brooklyn Eagle reported that a golfer had objected that the name "Garden City Country Club" was too similar to that of the existing Garden City Golf Club and could cause confusion. (Note: Garden City Golf Club hosted the 1902 U.S. Open. It has also been known as "Old Garden City" and the "Garden City Men's Club".) Tarbell was elected as the president of the newly formed club, which commissioned Walter J. Travis to lay out a golf course on the land it had leased. The new golf course was not expected to be ready for play until the fall, and a proposal to allow Garden City Country Club members to use the Wheatley Hills Club's golf course in the interim was rejected.

=== Construction ===
Construction of the golf course was completed by October 1916, but Travis delayed its opening to allow the turf to mature. That month, the club authorized a $50,000 bond issue to finance construction of a clubhouse designed by architect Morrell Smith. By November 1916, the club reportedly had about 150 members, half its target membership of 300. Annual dues were set at $100 for regular members and $50 for associate and nonresident members. Regular members were required to pay a $100 initiation fee by purchasing one share of the club's stock. The foundation work for the clubhouse was completed by February 1917, and construction of the building was scheduled to begin as soon as weather permitted.

The golf course opened in the summer of 1917, but saw little play during its first season because the clubhouse and other amenities were not yet available to members. The club selected Eugene K. McCarthy as its first golf professional and greenskeeper. (Note: McCarthy came to Garden City from Jacksonville, Florida, where he had been in charge of golfing, and had previously served for six years as athletic director at the University of South Carolina.) The club had 200 members by the end of the year.

On December 7, 1917, the club formally opened its new clubhouse with a dinner and dance. President Tarbell welcomed approximately 400 members and guests and credited the club's committees with the rapid development of its golf course and facilities. (Note: The standing committees were: Billiards and Bowling, Building, Entertainment, Golf, Membership, and Tennis.) (Note: At the time, Joseph J. Lannin was a club director and member of its entertainment committee. He later developed the Salisbury Country Club golf complex.) The clubhouse's rapid completion was noteworthy given the challenges posed by wartime conditions during the first year of American involvement in World War I.

=== Later history ===
In May 1918, Garden City Country Club hosted an 18-hole four-ball match to benefit the American Red Cross. Walter Hagen and John Anderson of Siwanoy Country Club defeated Jerome Travers and Jim Barnes by two holes with one hole remaining. The following year, the club installed piping to irrigate the golf course's greens, addressing problems that had affected putting conditions. One member joked about the coincidence with the growing temperance movement in the United States, observing that "there is an element of satisfaction among certain dry members that we are able to water the greens just at the time that the nation goes on the water wagon."

In 1928, the club was accused of attempting to close the section of Tanners Pond Road that ran through the golf course and appropriate the land for its use. The club had constructed a tee in the roadway and erected a fence across it. The affected section, approximately 2,260 feet (0.4 mi; 0.7 km) long, lay south of the railroad tracks and formed part of a north-south route connecting with Court House Road in Franklin Square. The road crossed the line of play on the course's fifth hole, where increasing traffic created a safety concern. The Village of Garden City had ordered the road's closure in 1924 but had reportedly agreed to construct a replacement road and preserve drainage through the original road corridor.

Maurice A. Gilmartin became president of Garden City Country Club during the Great Depression and headed the club for seven consecutive years. During his tenure, the club reduced its liabilities by $61,000 and increased its membership from 138 in 1934 to 343 in 1941. The club revised its membership policy for the first time since its founding, introducing a special membership category for men aged 21 to 35, and launched a membership drive to attract new members. These efforts strengthened the club's financial position, enabling it to reject an offer from real estate developers to purchase the property. By retaining ownership of its land, the club helped preserve the golf course from redevelopment as a proposed residential community of 600 homes. (Note: By 1938, Garden City Country Club owned its property, an arrangement that was relatively uncommon among golf clubs on Long Island. During the 1950s, Cherry Valley Club and Garden City Golf Club ended their respective leases with the Garden City Company and purchased their properties.)

In 1936, the 25th anniversary of the first American airmail delivery from Nassau Boulevard Airfield to Mineola, the golf course's 14th fairway served as a substitute for the former landing site during a reenactment of the historic flight. An airplane landed on the fairway before departing for Roosevelt Field. In August 1939, the club announced plans for a free exhibition match pairing Jack Mallon and Helen Dettweiler against Willie Klein and Helen Hicks. In October 1941, the club celebrated its silver jubilee with an open house for Garden City residents. The festivities included golf, a buffet luncheon, dinner, and dancing. That same year, club members organized a unit of the American Red Cross. Singer Perry Como, a member of the Garden City Country Club who once attained a five handicap, won the club championship in September 1954. In 2016, the club marked its centennial with a dinner, historical displays, and other events, including a season-opening scramble in which members played hickory golf. (Note: During the season-opening scramble in 2016, one member recorded a hole in one on the 167-yard 13th hole using a hickory-shafted brassie.)

== Golf course ==
The first two and last two holes of the golf course lie north of the railroad tracks, while the remaining holes lie to the south. A cart path alongside Edgemere Road passes beneath the tracks and connects the two sections near the second green and seventeenth tee. A separate tunnel between the ninth green and the clubhouse provides another crossing between the two sides. Travis designed the golf course with multiple tee locations on most holes to accommodate different wind conditions and provide alternative playing challenges for golfers of different abilities. His layout aimed to accommodate players with higher handicaps while still challenging skilled golfers seeking to make par. The golf course initially measured approximately 6,400 yards from the back tees.

Before the club hosted the Long Island Open in 1923, an article in the Brooklyn Eagle offered a critical assessment, describing the course as relatively flat and lacking the distinctive holes and extensive bunkering of the neighboring Garden City Golf Club, and considered it better suited to the average golfer than to competitors seeking a championship-level test. Nevertheless, the golf course proved challenging during the tournament, with only two rounds equaling or breaking par. The flat terrain made distances difficult to judge, while winds across the Hempstead Plains presented an additional challenge. Contemporary accounts also praised specific challenges on several of the holes and the golf course's strategically placed bunkers. In 1932, The Brooklyn Daily Times described it as "one of the best trapped affairs on [Long] Island".

Although the grounds were relatively barren when the golf course opened, trees were planted in the early 1930s. In 1941, a Nassau County drainage project added storm water basins in front of the third and fifth tees. The excavated soil was used to form a ridge between the sixth and seventh holes and to raise the 12th green onto a plateau. Robert Trent Jones remodeled the golf course in 1937 and 1958. Further renovations were undertaken by Brian Silva during the 1980s and by Keith Foster in the mid-2000s. Andy Staples began a further restoration of the golf course in 2026.

As of 2026, the golf course is a par 70 and measures 6,540 yards from the back tees:

Garden City Country Club
Tee	Rating/Slope	1	2	3	4	5	6	7	8	9	Out	10	11	12	13	14	15	16	17	18	In	Total
Par		4	3	4	4	3	4	4	4	4	34	4	3	5	3	5	4	5	3	4	36	70
Championship	71.9/131	374	186	373	375	176	448	395	419	444	3190	334	165	509	194	590	426	500	209	423	3350	6540
Tournament	70.5/127	351	166	352	346	154	430	384	405	420	3008	328	148	491	181	576	409	474	201	403	3211	6219
Member	68.3/122	337	152	316	300	137	419	372	358	341	2732	289	138	475	170	559	400	446	190	388	3055	5787
SI		15	17	5	11	13	1	9	3	7		16	14	6	12	8	2	18	10	4
Par		4	3	4	4	3	5	4	4	4	35	4	3	5	3	5	4	5	3	4	36	71
Ladies Blue	73.9/133	337	152	316	300	137	419	372	358	341	2732	289	138	475	170	559	400	446	190	388	3055	5787
SI		13	17	9	5	15	3	1	7	11		14	12	6	18	4	8	2	16	10
Ladies	71.6/128	301	142	275	280	124	392	354	329	333	2530	291	120	441	146	501	369	416	179	365	2828	5358
SI		11	13	3	5	15	17	1	7	9		14	18	6	16	8	2	10	12	4

== Clubhouse and other facilities ==
The clubhouse is located on the south side of Stewart Avenue near Nassau Boulevard. The 120-by-100-foot (37 by 30 m) building was designed by architect Morrell Smith in the Colonial Revival style, with white clapboard siding, a moss-green roof, and green shutters. The main floor centered on a 26-by-40-foot (7.9 by 12.2 m) lounge with an 18-foot (5.5 m) ceiling, flanked by an office, smoking room, and billiard room to the west and kitchens and service rooms to the east. A veranda overlooking the 18th green extended along the west facade, while the south facade featured two loggias, one enclosed as the main dining room. A sunken garden between the loggias provided access to the basement, which housed the men's locker room, a grill room, and bowling alleys. The second floor contained the women's locker room, a sitting room, a balcony overlooking the main room, and servants' quarters.

In addition to its clubhouse and golf course, Garden City Country Club has four tennis courts, three pickleball courts, and four paddle tennis courts.

== Tournaments ==
Garden City Country Club hosted the Long Island Open in 1923, when its associate professional, Willie Klein, successfully defended the title he had won the previous year at Cherry Valley Club. (Note: In 1923, Garden City Country Club created an associate professional position for Willie Klein, who had previously worked as an assistant professional and performed club-making duties. The new role allowed him to devote more time to competitive golf.) The club hosted the tournament four more times, in 1932, 1948, 1962, and 2016. It also hosted the Long Island Amateur in 1933, 1938, 1963, 1971, 1975, and 2000, as well as the Metropolitan Open in 1950 and the Metropolitan Amateur in 1954 and 1969. The club subsequently hosted the Metropolitan PGA Head Pro Championship in 2003 and the MGA Senior Open Championship in 2012.

During the first round of the MGA Senior Open Championship in August 2012, Ed Whitman of Knickerbocker Country Club shot a five-under-par 65, establishing a competitive record for the golf course.
