= Long Island Golf Association Amateur Championship =

Golf tournament in New York, US

The Long Island Golf Association Amateur Championship, or simply the Long Island Amateur, has been held annually since 1922 in Long Island. The tournament is organized by the Long Island Golf Association and played on a rotating basis at member clubs.

Throughout its history, no one has dominated this Championship like Gene Francis. Beginning in 1962, he won seven times, finished second four times, and was the medalist on four occasions. In more recent years, George Zahringer, John Baldwin, Bob Murphy, Ken Bakst, and Joe Saladino have dominated the Amateur Championship.

== Winners ==
Year	Course	Winner	Runner-up
2026	Fresh Meadow CC	Jack Estrella	Joseph Dolezal
2025	Huntington	Joseph Dolezal	Joseph Dolezal
2024	St. George's G&CC	Jonathan Farber	Max Silverman
2023	Meadow Brook Club	Carter Prince	Peicheng Chen
2022	Seawane CC	Peicheng Chen	Sam O'Hara
2021	Noyac GC	Tyler Gerbavsits	Darin Goldstein
2020	Huntington CC	Carter Prince	Max Siegfried
2019	Brookville CC	Prescott Butler	Russ Aue
2018	Wheatley Hills GC	Colby Anderson	Jonathan Farber
2017	St. George's G&CC	Garret Engel	Michael Miranda
2016	Cherry Valley Club	Darin Goldstein	Don Enga
2015	Southward Ho CC	Alan Specht	Darin Goldstein
2014	Westhampton CC	Joseph Saladino	Darin Goldstein
2013	Huntington CC	Matthew Lowe	Daniel Abbondandolo
2012	Engineers CC	Tim Rosenhouse	Matthew Demeo
2011	Tam O'Shanter Club	Joe Saladino	Clancy Waugh
2010	Inwood CC	Hunter Semels	Brody Nieporte
2009	Mill River Club	Bryan Pendrick	Brad Rock, Jr.
2008	Wheatley Hills GC	Alan Specht	Joe Saladino
2007	Huntington CC	Joe Saladino	Andreas Huber
2006	Brookville CC	Adam Pecora	Joe Saladino
2005	Woodcrest Club	John Keller	Joe Saladino
2004	Huntington Crescent Club	Sean Hartman	Steve Rose
2003	Fresh Meadow CC	Hunter Semels	Abbie Valentine
2002	Engineers CC	Zach Randol	Jonathan Jame
2001	Old Westbury G&CC	Al Falussy	Alan Specht
2000	Garden City CC	Marc Turnesa	Joe Saladino
1999	Plandome CC	Steve Rose	Alan Specht
1998	Glen Head CC	Jim Greene	Jon Doppelt
1997	Sands Point GC	Jon Doppelt	Ken Bakst
1996	Middle Bay CC	John Baldwin	Malcolm Smith
1995	St. George's G&CC	Ken Bakst	Sean Hartman
1994	Meadow Brook Club	Ken Bakst	Mike Brown
1993	Hempstead G&CC	Phil Gutterman	Tom Trakoval
1992	Huntington Crescent Club	Mal Galletta III	Richard Spear
1991	Nassau CC	John Baldwin	Malcolm Smith
1990	Westhampton CC	Jonathan Jame	Malcolm Smith
1989	North Shore CC	Michael Giacini	Jon Doppelt
1988	Wheatley Hills GC	Gene Francis	Mario Posillico
1987	Garden City GC	P. J. Cowan	Jonathan Jame
1986	Bethpage State Park	Peter Siedem	Robert Navesky
1985	Huntington CC	Malcolm Smith	David McArdle
1984	Huntington Crescent Club	Randy Beil	Dr. Stephen Frantz
1983	Plandome CC	Thomas McQuilling	Gene Francis
1982	Sands Point GC	George Zahringer	Brian Darby
1981	Old Westbury G&CC	Randy Beil	George Zahringer
1980	Nassau CC	George Zahringer	Richard Serian
1979	Sands Point GC	John Humm	Ken Mattiace
1978	Wheatley Hills GC	Gene Francis	Dick Hannington
1977	Huntington Crescent Club	Gene Francis	Frank Faruolo III
1976	Middle Bay CC	Gene Francis	Duane Hayden
1975	Garden City CC	Robert Murphy	Gene Francis
1974	Plandome CC	Robert Murphy	Gene Francis
1973	Mill River Club	Gene Francis	Frank Faruolo III
1972	St. George's G&CC	George Burns	Dick Stanley
1971	Garden City CC	Robert Murphy	Alan Gilison
1970	Wheatley Hills GC	Robert Murphy	Alan Gilison
1969	Nassau CC	Gene Francis	Tim Holland
1968	Huntington Crescent Club	Duane Hayden	Mike Mattwell
1967	Sands Point GC	John Baldwin	John Humm
1966	Meadow Brook Club	George H. Bostwick, Jr.	George Gennity
1965	Nassau CC	John Baldwin	Charles Slicklen, Jr.
1964	Cold Spring CC	Ralph Johnston	Alan Gilison
1963	Garden City CC	Gene Francis	John Humm
1962	Woodmere Club	Ralph Johnston	Pete Bostwick
1961	North Shore CC	Robert Kiersky	Gene Francis
1960	Nassau CC	Gordon Stott	Charles Slicklen, Jr.
1959	Wheatley Hills GC	Art Silverstone	Joe Darcy
1958	Plandome CC	Don Cherry	William Schlief, Jr.
1957	Southward Ho CC	Tim Holland	Michael Mattwell
1956	Rockville Links CC	Tim Holland	Mal Galletta
1955	North Hempstead CC	Robert Sweeny	William Edwards
1954	Seawane CC	Tim Holland	Frank Strafaci
1953	Sands Point GC	W.G. Holloway	Dick Fales
1952	Nassau CC	John Humm	Frank Strafaci
1951	North Shore CC	Frank Strafaci	Billy Edwards
1950	Garden City GC	Gordon Stott	Mal Galletta
1949	Meadow Brook Club	Frank Strafaci	James Paul
1948	Rockville Links CC	John Humm	Joe Feldman
1947	Pomonok CC	Frank Strafaci	W. Y. Dear, Jr.
1946	Wheatley Hills GC	Mal Galletta	James Paul
1945	Hempstead G&CC	Thomas Strafaci	Peter Ladislaw
1944	Cherry Valley Club	Thomas Strafaci	Frank Paley
1942–43	No tournament		
1941	Inwood CC	Frank Strafaci	William Tobin
1940	Sands Point GC	T. S. Tailer, Jr.	Felix Zaremba
1939	Sands Point GC	Kenneth Sheldon	John Humm
1938	Garden City CC	Frank Strafaci	Thomas Strafaci
1937	Pomonok CC	Richard Ciuci	Alick Gerard, Jr.
1936	Seawane CC	Charles H. Mayo, Jr.	R. M. Torgerson
1935	Wheatley Hills GC	Charles H. Mayo, Jr.	A. W. Biggs
1934	Hempstead G&CC	A. W. Biggs	Jarvis S. Hicks, Jr.
1933	Garden City CC	Jack Mackie, Jr.	A. W. Biggs
1932	St. Albans	George Dunlap	Charles Hrostoski
1931	Timber Point GC	Philip Perkins	E. H. Driggs, Jr.
1930	Cherry Valley Club	E. H. Driggs, Jr.	Edmund Held
1929	Lakeville	E. H. Driggs, Jr.	Edmund Held
1928	Nassau CC	George Voigt	E. H. Driggs, Jr.
1927	Engineers CC	Maurice McCarthy, Jr.	H. K. Kerr
1926	St. Albans	A. W. Biggs	Jack Mytton
1925	Garden City GC	E. H. Driggs, Jr.	H. K. Kerr
1924	Pomonok CC	H. P. Bingham	John Lang
1923	Engineers CC	J. N. Stearns, Jr.	E. H. Driggs, Jr.
1922	Lido GC	H. W. Maxwell, Jr.	Don McKellar
