= Willie Klein =

American professional golfer (1901–1957)

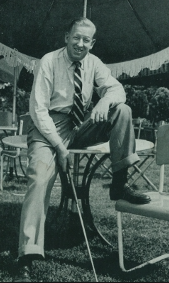
- Klein, c. 1950

Personal information
- Full name: William L. Klein
- Nationality: United States
- Born: 1901 Long Island, New York, U.S.
- Died: January 3, 1957 (aged 55) Mineola, New York, U.S.

Career
- Sport: Golf
- Status: Professional
- Former tour: PGA Tour
- Professional wins: 9

Number of wins by tour
- PGA Tour: 8
- Other: 1

Best results in major championships
- Masters Tournament: WD: 1935
- PGA Championship: T9: 1927
- U.S. Open: T9: 1926
- The Open Championship: DNP

Achievements and awards
- Metropolitan Section PGA Hall of Fame: 2007

William L. Klein (1901 – January 3, 1957) was an American professional golfer. He won eight PGA Tour events during his career. He played in the 1923 PGA Championship, winning a first round match, and also played in the 1935 Masters Tournament.

== Career ==
Klein was born in 1901 on Long Island, New York.

He began his career as a caddie at the Garden City Golf Club in 1913, later becoming the club's caddymaster and learning the game from its head pro, Frank Bellwood. He subsequently spent five years at Garden City Country Club as assistant pro under Fergus Cameron.

Klein worked as the head pro at Wheatley Hills Golf Club in East Williston, New York, from 1926 to 1957. He also worked in the winter months at the La Gorce Country Club in Miami Beach, Florida, from 1927 to 1956. Klein also played on what later became the PGA Tour, winning nine events.

The 1923 PGA Championship was held September 24–29 at the Pelham Country Club in Pelham Manor, New York. Klein was in the starting field and opened up affairs in a first round match against Charles Rowe which he won by the score of 4 and 3. He lost his second round match to Alec Campbell by the identical score.

== Personal life ==
Klein married Mildred Hall in 1926. He died at Nassau Hospital in Mineola, New York on January 3, 1957.

== Awards and honors ==
In 2007, Klein was inducted into the Metropolitan PGA Section Hall of Fame.

== Professional wins (9) ==
=== PGA Tour wins (8) ===
- 1922 Long Island Open
- 1923 Long Island Open
- 1924 Lido Country Club Open
- 1925 Miami Open
- 1928 New York State Open
- 1929 Mid-South Open
- 1933 Long Island Open
- 1936 Miami Open

=== Other wins (1) ===
- 1932 Metropolitan PGA Championship
