= David Bell (golfer) =

Scottish golfer

Personal information
- Full name: David Bell
- Nationality: Scotland; United States
- Born: c. 1880 Scotland

Career
- Sport: Golf
- Status: Professional

Best results in major championships
- Masters Tournament: DNP
- PGA Championship: DNP
- U.S. Open: 3rd: 1900
- The Open Championship: DNP

David "Davie" Bell (c. 1880 – ?) was a Scottish professional golfer. Bell placed third in the 1900 U.S. Open at Chicago Golf Club in Wheaton, Illinois. He carded consistent rounds of 78-83-83-78=322 and won $125.

== Early life ==
Bell was born circa 1880 in Scotland.

== Golf career ==
Bell placed third in the 1900 U.S. Open, held 4–5 October 1900, at Chicago Golf Club in Wheaton, Illinois. He posted rounds of 78-83-83-78=322 and won $125. In the 1901 Western Open, held at Midlothian Country Club, he was second behind Laurie Auchterlonie. Bell and Willie Smith played some exhibition matches in Santa Barbara, California, in the winter of 1901.

== Death ==
Bell's date of death is unknown.
