= Marion Turpie =

American golfer (1908–1967)

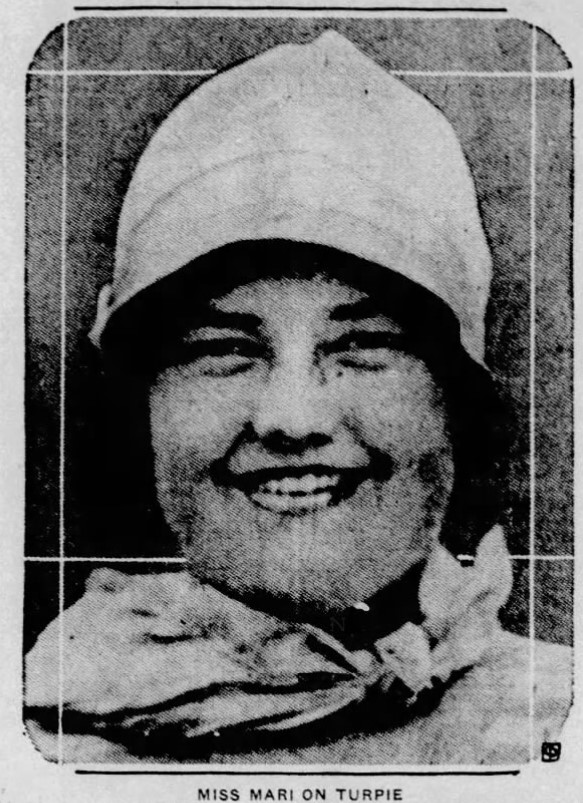

Personal information
- Full name: Marion Turpie
- Nationality: American
- Born: December 1908 St Andrews, Scotland
- Died: 1967

Sport
- Country: America
- Sport: Golf

Marion Turpie (December 1908 – 1967) was an American amateur golfer. She was said to be the first great female golfer in New Orleans.

== Biography ==
Turpie was born in Scotland at St Andrews in 1908, but moved to New Orleans only a few months later. Turpie came from a golf family. Her father George Turpie was a golf club pro and her uncle Harry Turpie taught Chick Evans. She was said to have started playing golf as soon as she could swing a club. Turpie was known for her "flat swing".

Turpie won her first tournament, a handicap event, at the age of 13. She won the 1927 and 1928 editions of the Louisiana Ladies State Golf Championships.

Turpie competed in the Women's Southern Golf Association Tournament at least five times. She won the 1926, 1928 and 1931 editions of the tournament, placed second in the 1927 edition and third in the 1930 edition. In her 1928 victory, she set a new course record of 79 through 31 holes in the rain. Upon her return home from her 1928 win, she was greeted by a fleet of yachts from the Southern Yacht Club who had brought her home. Prior to her victory, she came in second in the Pan-American Golf Championship at the Edgewater Gulf Hotel course.

She later moved to the eastern United States where she won the Long Island Championship in 1935, 1936 and 1940 and was runner-up in 1932, 1933 and 1937.

Turpie won the 1926 Trans-Mississippi Tournament, came in 2nd place in the 1929 Trans-Mississippi Tournament and won the 1937 Women's Eastern Title. She won the New York State and New York Metropolitan Title in 1937. She won the Ekwanok Women's Tournament on August 21, 1938, and also won the Long Island Medal Play Tournament that year.

She later married English actor, Harry McNaughton, who died in 1967. Turpie herself died on February 27, 1967, in New Orleans. She was inducted into the Greater New Orleans Sports Hall of Fame in 1971.

== Tournament wins ==
- 1926 Women's Southern Amateur, Trans-Mississippi Tournament
- 1927 Louisiana Ladies State Amateur
- 1928 Women's Southern Amateur, Louisiana Ladies State Amateur
- 1931 Women's Southern Amateur
- 1935 Long Island Championship
- 1936 Long Island Championship
- 1937 Metropolitan Match Play Amateur
- 1938 Ekwanok Women's Tournament
- 1939 Metropolitan Match Play Amateur
- 1940 Long Island Championship
- 1941 Women's Eastern Amateur
