= Randolph Harrison McKim =

American clergy and writer (1842–1920)

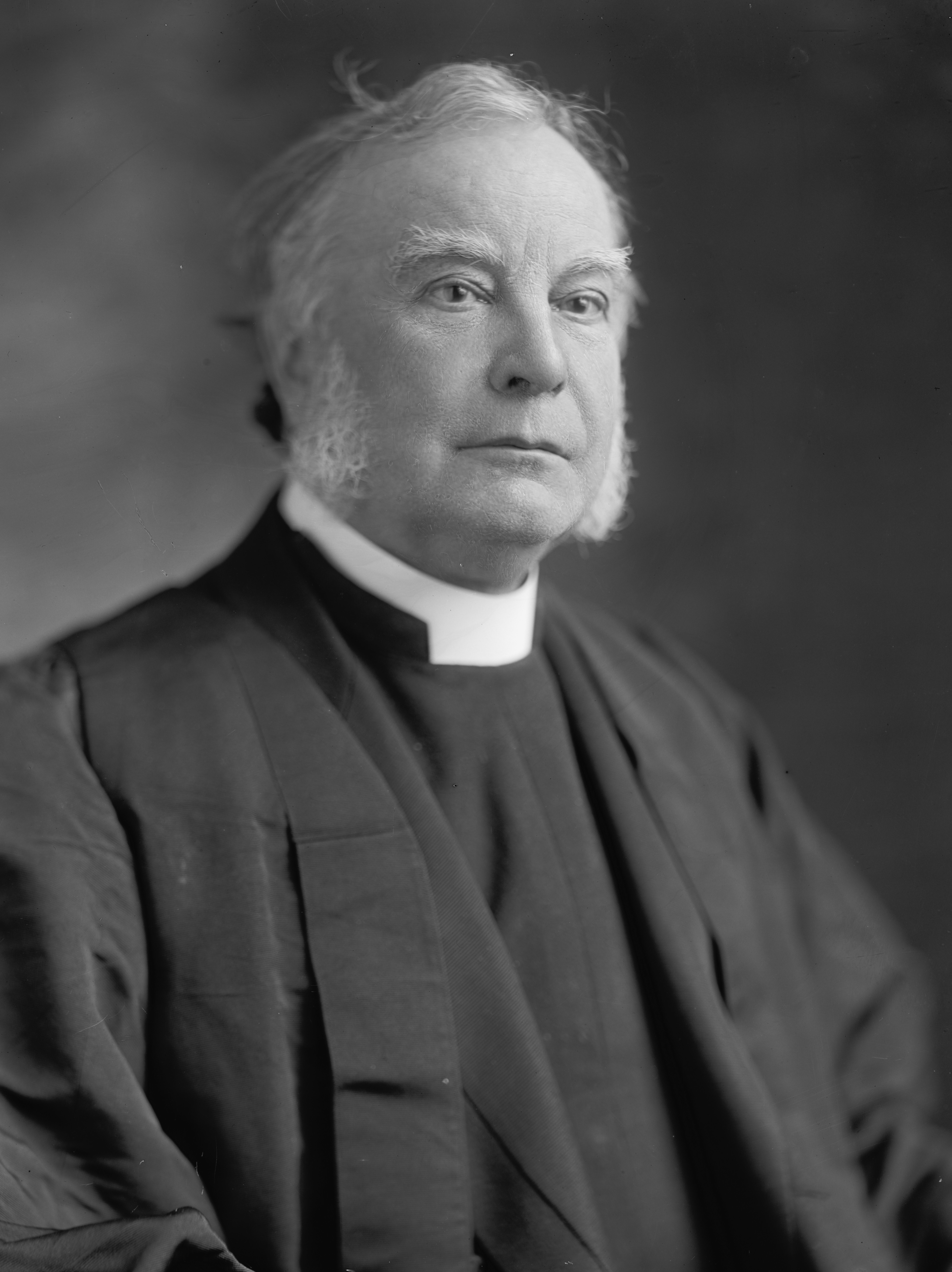
- Portrait of McKim
- Born: April 16, 1842; Baltimore, Maryland, U.S.
- Died: July 15, 1920 (aged 78); Bedford Springs, Pennsylvania, U.S.
- Resting place: Green Mount Cemetery; Baltimore, Maryland, U.S.
- Education: University of Virginia; Virginia Theological Seminary
- Occupations: Religious leader; writer
- Spouse: Annie M. Clyde Brooke (m. 1890)
- Children: 2

Signature
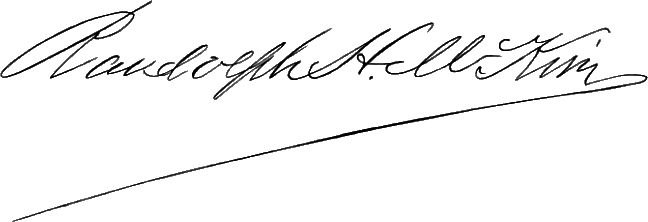

Randolph Harrison McKim (April 16, 1842 – July 15, 1920) was an American Episcopal clergyman and writer. He served in the Confederate States Army as a chaplain and wrote numerous works on theology and the Civil War.

== Early life ==
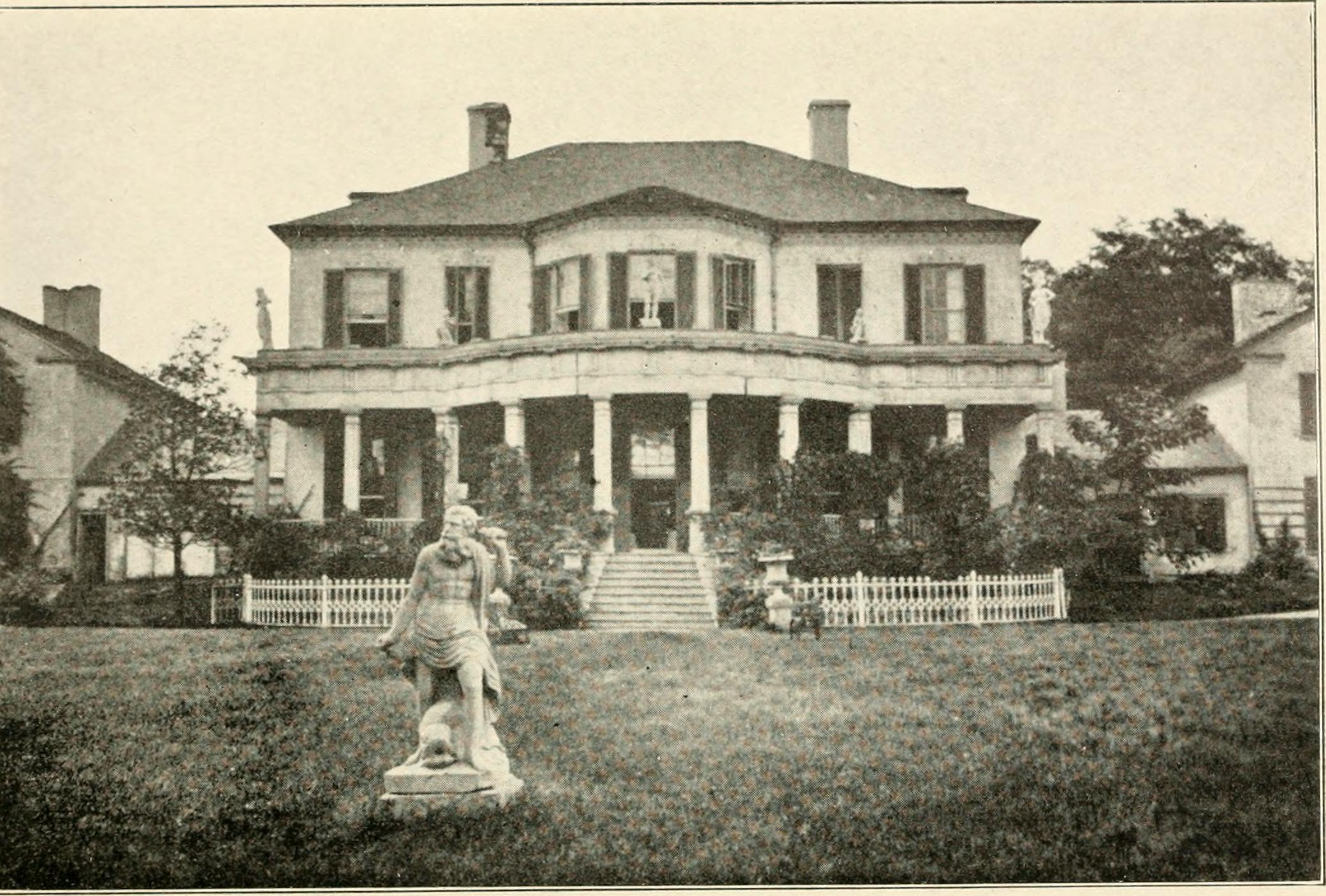
Home of McKim in Baltimore

Randolph Harrison McKim was born on April 16, 1842, in Baltimore, Maryland, to Catherine L. (née Harrison) and John S. McKim. He attended, but did not graduate from the University of Virginia, due to the start of the American Civil War.

== Civil War ==
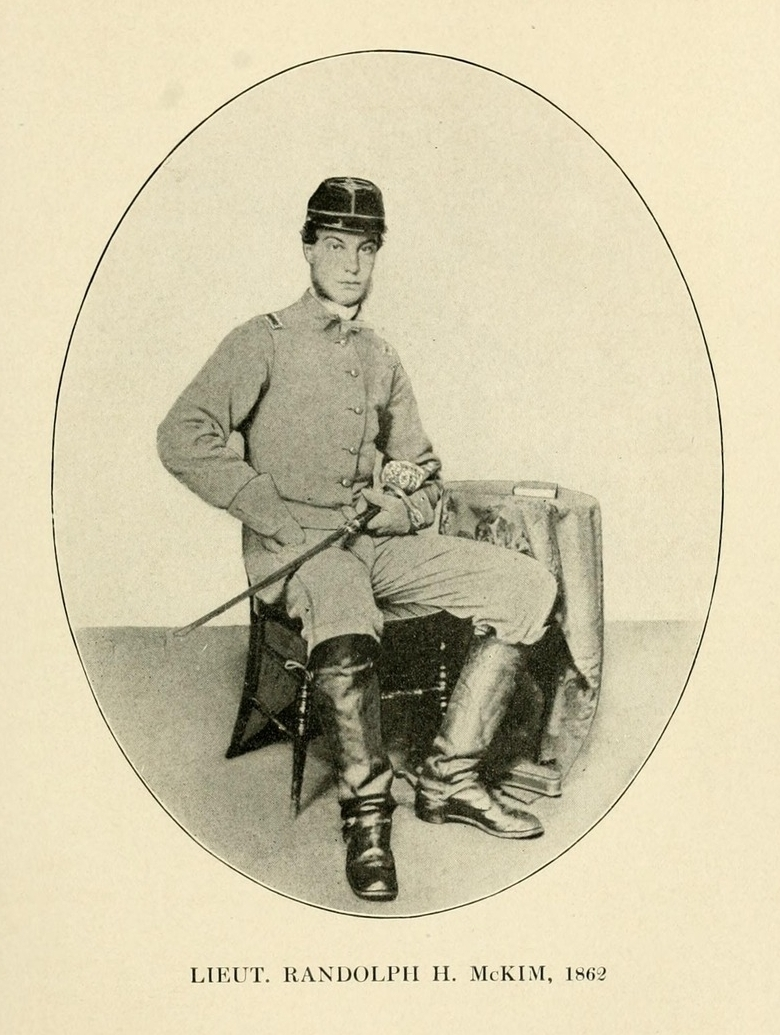
McKim as a soldier in 1862

McKim enlisted as a private with the Confederate States Army. He served briefly under General Stonewall Jackson. He rose to the rank of first lieutenant and served as aide-de-camp of General George H. Steuart. He resigned in 1863 to join the ministry. He resumed his studies for the Protestant Episcopal Church ministry with reverend Edward H. Ingle. He graduated the Virginia Theological Seminary in 1864. He later served as chaplain of the 2nd Virginia Cavalry Regiment under Colonel Thomas T. Mulford and General Fitzhugh Lee.

== Religious career ==
McKim was ordained a deacon by Bishop John Johns on May 11, 1864, in Trinity Church. On May 26, 1866, he was ordained a priest by Bishop Johns. He served as assistant rector of Emmanuel Episcopal Church in Baltimore. He then became rector of St. John's Episcopal Church in Portsmouth, Virginia. He was then rector of Christ Church in Alexandria, Virginia, for eight years. He then had charges in Holy Trinity Church in Harlem, New York, for 11 years. In the 1870s when the Reformed Episcopal Church formed from the Episcopal Church, McKim was on the conservative side. He spent two years as rector of Trinity Episcopal Church in New Orleans.

McKim accepted the role of pastor in December 1888 for the Church of the Epiphany in Washington, D.C. He served in that role from 1889 to his death. In 1897, he was elected dean of the Virginia Theological Seminary, but declined the position. He was an honored guest at the 1907 Jamestown Tercentennial Exposition in Jamestown, Virginia, by the American church.

Following the outbreak of World War I, McKim was an advocate for national preparedness for war and universal military training. He officiated at the Navy League and was an honorary vice president of the organization. He took part in the healing mission of James Moore Hickson in April 1920. Following Hickson's visit, he inaugurated healing missions at the Epiphany Church and Trinity Church.

McKim was active in the organization of the Church Temperance Society, the Church League, and the founding of the Episcopal Diocese of Washington. He was president of the standing committee of the diocese for 17 years. He was a delegate to the General Convention from 1889 to 1910 and was deputy of the triennial general convention for 40 years. He served in the House of Deputies of the Episcopal Church from 1904 to 1913 and served as the body's president for nine years.

== Works ==
McKim wrote books about theology. His works include:

- Christ and Modern Unbelief
- Conditional Immortality
- Present Day Problems of Christian Thought
- In Memoriam, Good Men A Nation's Strength: A Sermon Preached on the Death of Gen. Robert E. Lee, in Christ Church, Alexandria, Va., October 16, 1870 (1870)
- Washington's Church: An Historical Sketch of Old Christ Church, Alexandria, Virginia, together with a Brief Description of the Centenary Services Therein, November 20 and 21st, 1873 (1894)
- Leo XIII at the Bar of History: A Discussion of the Papal Plan for Christian Unity (1897)
- The Meaning of Our National Bereavement (1901)
- The Gospel in the Christian Year and in Christian Experience: Practical Sermons for the People, Advent to Trinity (1902)
- What is Catholicity? (1903)
- A Soldier's Recollections: Leaves from the Diary of a Young Confedewrate with an Oration on the Motives and Aims of the Soldiers of the South (1903)
- The Problem of the Pentateuch: An Examination of the Results of the Higher Criticism (1906)
- Lee The Christian Hero: A Sermon Delivered in the Lee Memorial Church, Lexington, Virginia, Sunday, January 20, 1907 (1907)
- A Proposal to Change the Name of the Protestant Episcopal Church, Considered in the Light of True Catholic Principles (1913)
- National Opportunity and Responsibility: A Sermon Delivered in the Church of Epiphany, Washington, D.C. (1915)
- Romanism in the Light of History (1914)
- Is the Episcopal Church Catholic or is It Protestant? (1916)
- America's Stewardship in Respect to Wealth, to Constitutional Principles and to International Obligations: A Sermon Delivered in the Church of the Epiphany, Washington, D.C. (1916)
- America Summoned to a Holy War: A Sermon Delivered in the Church of the Epiphany (1917)
- For God and Country; Addresses in War Time (1918)
- The Soul of Lee (1919)

== Personal life ==
McKim married Annie M. (née Clymer) Brooke, daughter of Daniel R. Clymer, on July 26, 1890. They had two daughters, Katherine L. and Eleanor. He lived on K Street in Washington, D.C.

McKim died of heart disease on July 15, 1920, while playing golf in Bedford Springs, Pennsylvania. He was buried at Green Mount Cemetery in Baltimore.

== Legacy ==
McKim's will left a portion of his estate to the University of Virginia and requested almost US$70,000 of it to be used for a new nurses' dormitory.
