= Omni Bedford Springs Resort =

Hotel in Pennsylvania, United States

- Bedford Springs Hotel Historic District
- U.S. National Register of Historic Places
- U.S. National Historic Landmark District
- Pennsylvania state historical marker
- Pittsburgh Landmark – PHLF
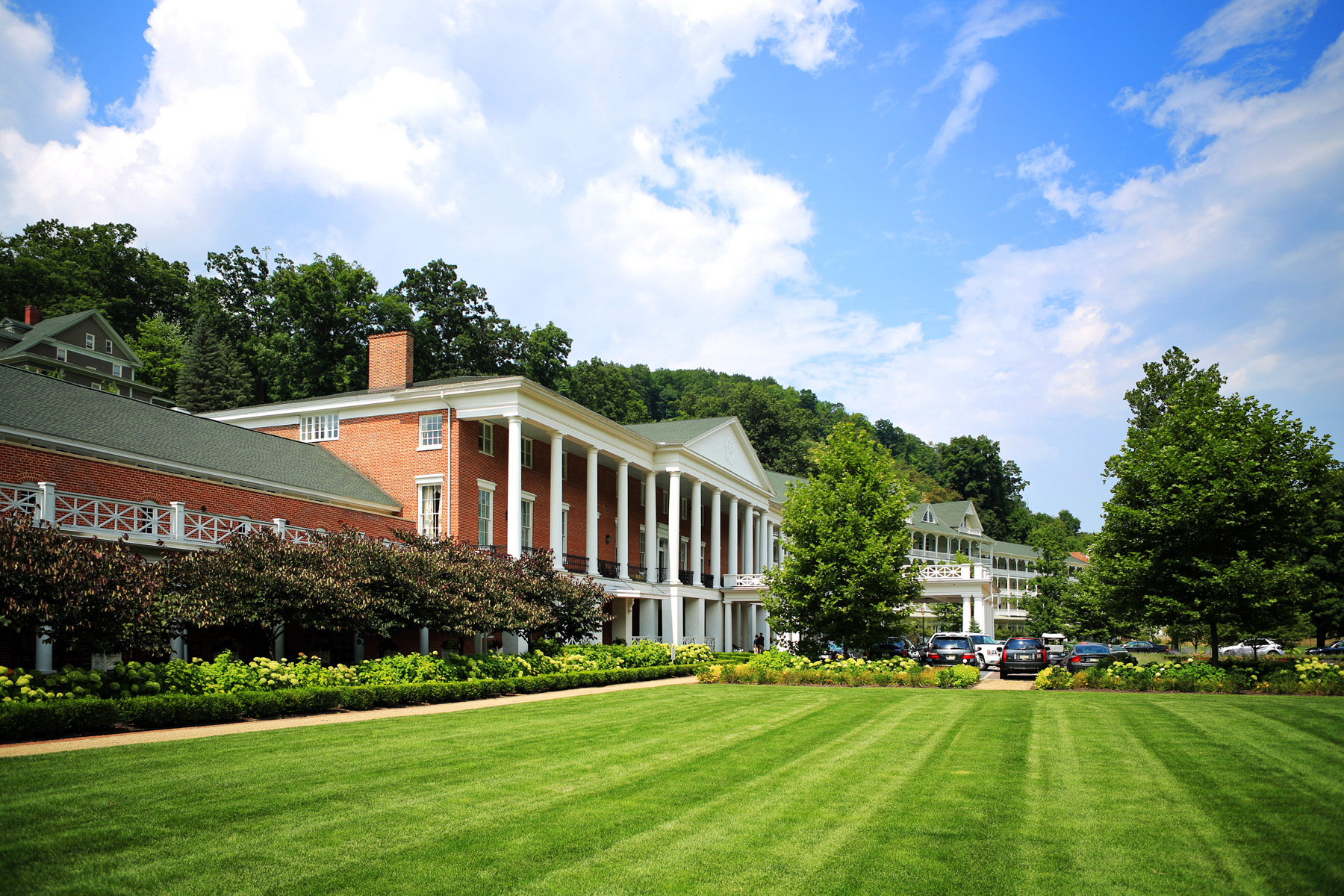
- Omni Bedford Springs Resort & Spa - facade

- Location within Pennsylvania Location within the United States
- Location: Off of U.S. 220, Bedford, Pennsylvania
- Coordinates: 39°59′47″N 78°30′28″W
- Area: 300 acres (120 ha)
- Built: 1806
- Architect: Solomon Filler
- Golf course designer: Spencer Oldham - 1895; A. W. Tillinghast - 1912; Donald Ross - 1923
- Architectural style: Colonia Revival, Greek Revival, Italianate
- NRHP reference No.: 84001413

Significant dates
- Added to NRHP: December 20, 1984
- Designated NHLD: July 17, 1991
- Designated PHMC: June 4, 1947
- Designated PHLF: 2014

The Omni Bedford Springs Resort & Spa is a resort hotel which is located outside of Bedford, Pennsylvania. Established in 1806, it is one of the last and best-preserved of 19th-century resort hotels based around mineral springs.

The hotel was documented in 2005 by the Historic American Buildings Survey (HABS). Omni Bedford Springs Resort & Spa is a member of Historic Hotels of America, the official program of the National Trust for Historic Preservation. The resort is part of the Omni Hotels & Resorts brand, based out of Dallas, Texas.

A portion of the resort property, including the hotel, golf course, and spring areas, was designated a National Historic Landmark District in 1984.

== History ==
In 1796, Nicholas Shauffler discovered a high mineral content in the natural freshwater springs located on the property of Fredrick Naugel, outside of Bedford, Pennsylvania. These springs were reputed to have 'healing powers" by the Native Americans who had come to this spot to drink from and bathe in the waters for centuries. Doctor John Anderson, then practicing in the town of Bedford, purchased the land containing the springs in 1798 and proceeded to build bathing facilities for his patients; thus starting the tradition of people traveling to experience the waters of the Bedford springs and setting the foundation for what is today Bedford Springs Resort, an upscale destination, located just off the Pennsylvania Turnpike.

The popularity and reputation of the Dr. Anderson's treatments grew throughout the early 19th Century and by 1809, there were three buildings on the site, including The Stone House, Crockford and a precursor to the Evitt House. According to a travelogue by Joshua Galpin in 1809, these buildings included a "large frame lodging house and several smaller ones for families – warm and cold baths and a billiard room." In 1824, Bedford Springs was hailed as the "Montpelier of America" in a column in the July edition of the National Gazette & Library Register, which noted with praise the waters, accommodations, activities, food and wine. The popularity of the resort benefited from the emphasis on outdoor life in the mid-nineteenth century as east coast American cities became increasingly industrialized and polluted, and from the establishment of stops in Bedford for the B&O and Pennsylvania Railroads beginning in 1872, providing easy accessibility from cities such as Washington, D.C., Philadelphia, and New York City.

Bedford Springs became an attraction for politicians, and, in addition to serving as the "Summer White House" for President James Buchanan from 1857 to 1861, also served as a getaway and meeting place for other presidents such as William Henry Harrison, James K. Polk and Zachary Taylor, as well as a multitude of senators and congressmen, and their families. The first transatlantic cable sent from England to the United States was received by President Buchanan at the hotel on August 12, 1858.

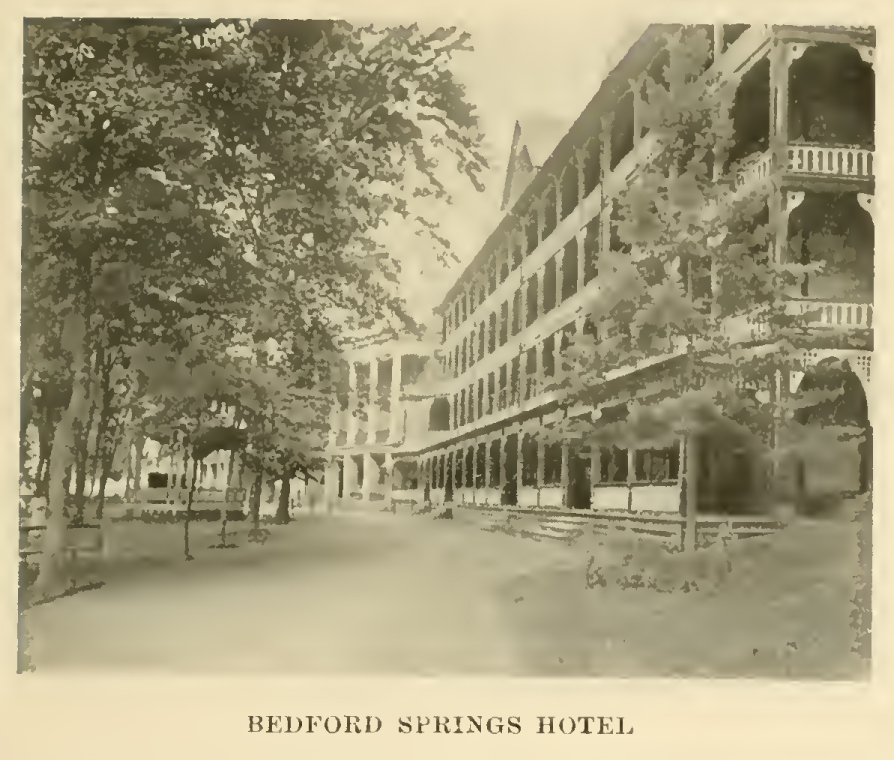
Bedford Springs Hotel, circa 1909

The decades of the 1870s through the 1890s, the "golden age" of America's grand resorts, saw the "resort gold standard" set at Bedford Springs. A series of colorful spring houses, bridges, and gates dotted the expansive grounds, and a "serpentine trail" led party excursions from one spring to the next. In the beginning of the 20th century, as medicine and health-awareness advanced, the validity of the Springs' healing powers decreased slightly, but the hotel still flourished, and in 1905, a major renovation of the complex included a monumental double-decked colonnade, which connected the hotel's main dining room to a columned pavilion at the Magnesia Springs across Shober's Run, as well as a new building with a spring-fed indoor pool, reportedly the first such facility in the United States at the time it was built.

In the 1930s, the hotel's resident physician, Dr. William E. Fitch, established the "Bedford Cure," a health regimen that required a three-week stay at the resort, which still operated successfully throughout the 1930s and 1940s. During World War II, the hotel and its grounds were used by the U.S. Navy as the Naval Training School (Radio) and then later as a detention center for interned Japanese diplomats.

The decade of the 1950s saw numerous improvements and renovations to the property, including the installation of modern environmental controls and sprinkler systems. Bedford Springs was also open year-round for the first time in 1950. The hotel continued to operate for the next three decades, highlighted by then California Governor Ronald Reagan's stay in 1975, making him the seventh current, former or future president to spend time at Bedford Springs. However tastes in leisure travel had changed significantly over the years and the property eventually shut its doors in 1986. Two years later, a flash flood severely damaged several buildings at Bedford Springs and the site fell into disrepair. Even so, the site was placed on the National Register of Historic Places in 1984. Then in 1998, the property was purchased by Bedford Resort Partners Limited for $8 million and the massive undertaking of restoring Bedford Springs to its former prestige began.

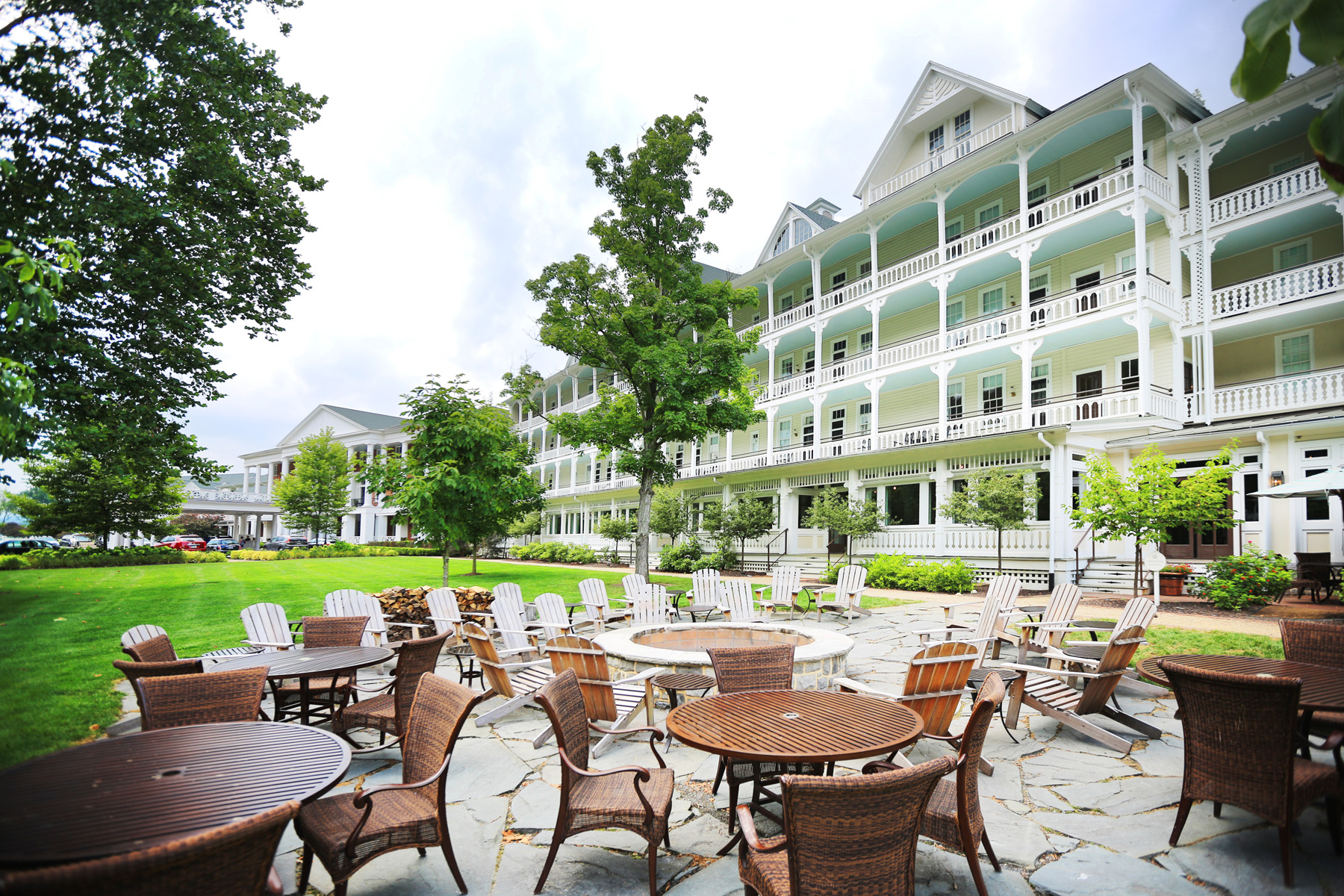
Facade of Omni Bedford Springs Resort.

== The springs ==
The Bedford Springs were believed to have various and diverse medicinal values due to each spring's unique mix of minerals. The "Bedford Cure" required the patient to imbibe each type of water (or a specific type of water depending on the individual's ailment) on a daily basis during their three-week stay. Examples of the unique springs and their uses are "Magnesium Spring," used for stomach ailments, the "Iron Spring," which was prescribed for iron deficiencies and healthy bones, the "Black Spring" which was used primarily to irrigate the golf course; and the "Sweet Spring" the waters of which were the most palatable. An eighth spring, named the Eternal Spring was discovered in 2006, during the expansion and renovation of the resort.

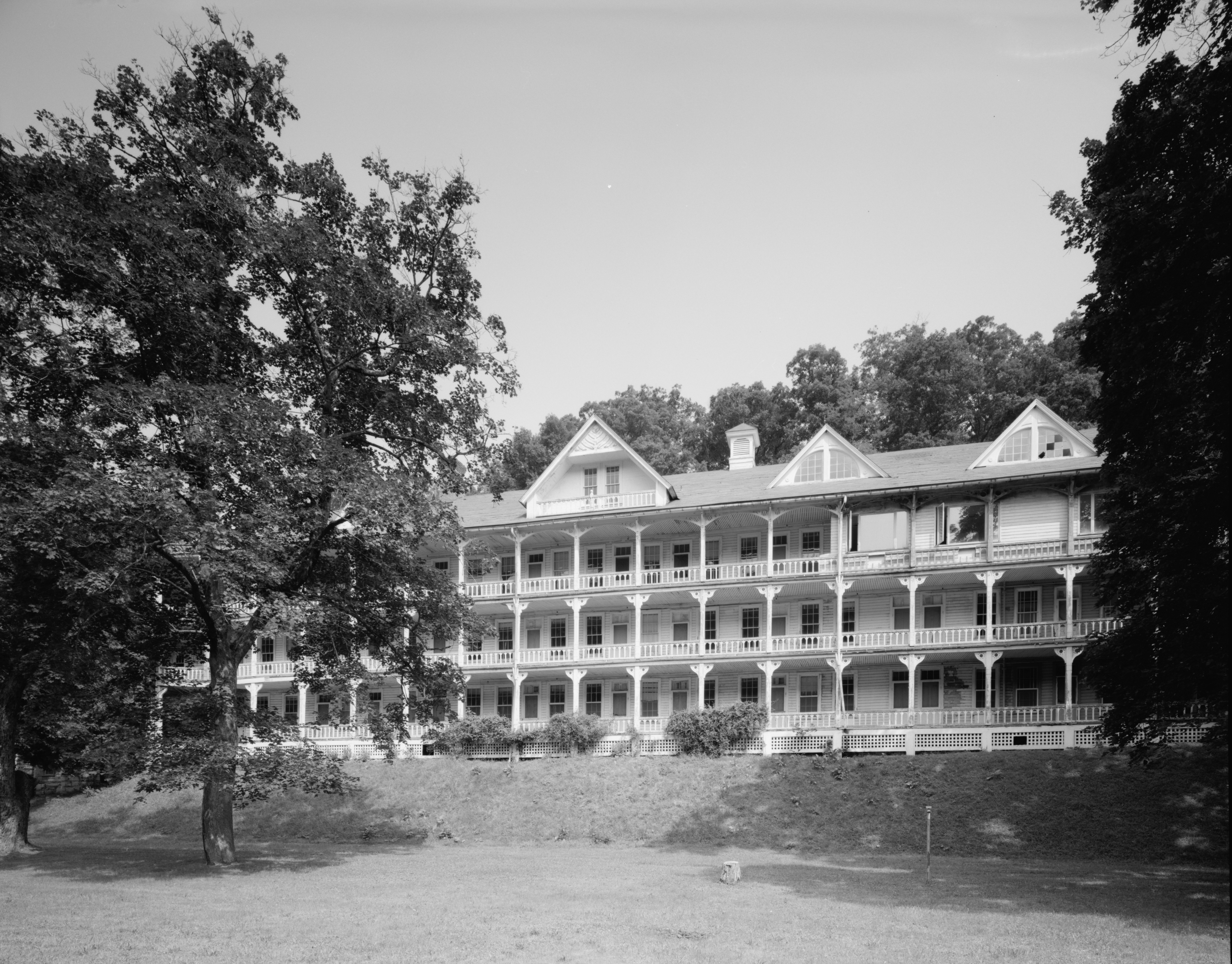
HABS photo of the eastern facade of the hotel in 2005.

== The restored resort ==
The hotel re-opened for overnight guests on July 12, 2007. The hotel buildings were completely restored and renovated, and additional wings added. In January 2009, the resort was purchased by Omni Hotels, a luxury hotel brand that operates properties across the United States, Canada, and Mexico. The restored resort is a 216-room hotel with 4 suites, golf course, spa, and conference facility. The spa wing accommodates additional rooms and a full-service spa. The hotel contains a 130-seat restaurant along with a fully restored colonial-style tavern in the Stone House, with original, massive stone walls and beams dating to 1806.

The revitalized resort also contains a new outdoor pool and a complete restoration of the original indoor pool. The resort offers outdoor activities including a network of hiking trails to nearby Rainsburg and Buchanan State Forest, bicycling, off-road Segways, UTVs, cross-country skiing, fly fishing, river rafting, carriage rides and day excursions to many of Bedford's famous historic sites and beautiful covered bridges.

== Golf course ==
The resort's golf course was originally designed by Spencer Oldham in 1895 and is one of the oldest courses in the United States. In 1901, head professional Charles Thorn worked to improve the course by rebuilding greens and tee boxes and installing an irrigation system using the natural springs found in the area as a water source.

In 1912, A.W. Tillinghast redesigned the course bringing it down to 9 holes. In 1923, Donald Ross redesigned the course again and brought it back to 18 holes. During the resorts extensive restoration, the golf course was brought back to the design that Donald Ross created in 1923.

As part of the resorts relaunch, an extensive renovation of the Tillinghast/Ross course was undertaken. The historical course had suffered over time from sediment filling in the margins of the waterways, and from "modern" approaches to landscape in the 1950s, which tried to "tidy-up" the creek edges with a "mown-lawn" approach. The renovation of the course, renamed the Bedford Springs Old Course, restored the natural spring bed with native grasses and other natural materials indigenous to the flood plain. Befitting the course's siting next to Shober's Run, there are water features apparent at nearly every hole.

== The spa ==
Fed by the eighth spring, the Springs Eternal Spa is a 30,000-square-foot (2,800 m2) spa and salon based on the history of Bedford Springs. The spa's standard treatment, called The Bedford Baths, involves immersing the body alternately in hot and cool pools and soaking in herb-infused steam from the mineral springs.

== See also ==
- List of Historic Hotels of America
- List of National Historic Landmarks in Pennsylvania
- National Register of Historic Places listings in Bedford County, Pennsylvania
