= Tyler Strafaci =

American professional golfer (born 1998)

Personal information
- Nationality: United States
- Born: July 23, 1998 (age 28) Davie, Florida, U.S.
- Height: 6 ft 0 in (1.83 m)
- Weight: 170 lb (77 kg; 12 st)

Career
- Sport: Golf
- College: Georgia Tech
- Turned professional: 2021

Best results in major championships
- Masters Tournament: CUT: 2021
- PGA Championship: DNP
- U.S. Open: CUT: 2018, 2021
- The Open Championship: DNP

Tyler Strafaci (born July 23, 1998) is an American professional golfer who attended Georgia Tech. In 2020, he won the U.S. Amateur Championship.

== Amateur career ==
Strafaci was born in Davie, Florida. He graduated from American Heritage School in Plantation, Florida, winning the state championship in 2015. He was the No. 1 ranked amateur in Florida before enrolling at Georgia Tech in 2016.

He reached the round of 32 at the U.S. Amateur in 2017, defeating future PGA Tour winner Matthew Wolff in the opening round. He made his PGA Tour debut in March 2018 at the Valspar Championship. He also qualified for the 2018 U.S. Open at Shinnecock Hills.

In 2020, Strafaci won the North and South Amateur in July. He then won the U.S. Amateur at Bandon Dunes in August, defeating SMU's Ollie Osborne 1 up in the 36-hole final. He joined his Georgia Tech roommate, Andy Ogletree, as well as Matt Kuchar and Bobby Jones as Yellow Jackets to win the championship.

Strafaci was a member of the winning American Walker Cup team in 2021, then announced he was turning pro.

== Professional career ==
Strafaci made his professional debut at the AT&T Byron Nelson in May 2021, missing the cut. He made his first cut on the PGA Tour at the Memorial Tournament in June, finishing in a tie for 57th place.

== Family life ==
Strafaci is the grandson of Frank Strafaci, winner of the U.S. Amateur Public Links in 1935 and the North and South Amateur in 1938 and 1939, the same tournament Tyler won 81 years later. Frank finished in ninth place at the 1937 U.S. Open.

== Amateur wins ==
- 2013 Broward County Amateur
- 2017 Valspar Collegiate
- 2020 North and South Amateur, Palmetto Amateur, U.S. Amateur
- 2021 Georgia Cup

== Results in major championships ==
Results not in chronological order before 2019 and in 2020.

Tournament	2018	2019	2020	2021
Masters Tournament				CUT
PGA Championship				
U.S. Open	CUT			CUT
The Open Championship			NT	

Did not play

CUT = missed the half-way cut
NT = No tournament due to COVID-19 pandemic

== U.S. national team appearances ==
Amateur

- Walker Cup: 2021 (winners)
