= John Shippen =

American professional golfer (1879–1968)

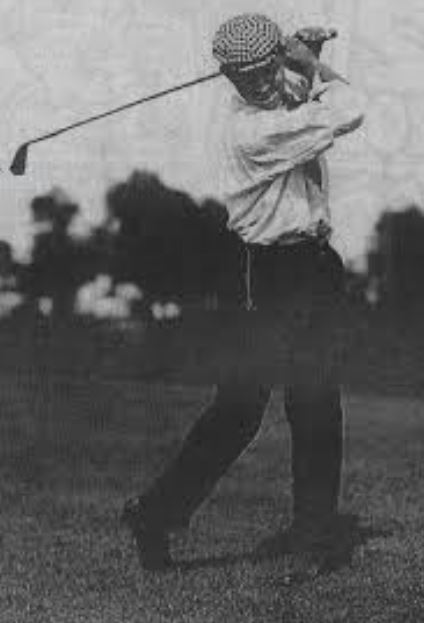
- Shippen, c. 1899

Personal information
- Full name: John Matthew Shippen
- Nationality: United States
- Born: December 2, 1879 Washington, D.C., U.S.
- Died: May 20, 1968 (aged 88) Newark, New Jersey, U.S.
- Height: 5 ft 6 in (1.68 m)
- Weight: 158 lb (72 kg)

Career
- Sport: Golf
- Status: Professional

Best results in major championships
- Masters Tournament: DNP
- U.S. Open: T5: 1902
- The Open Championship: DNP

John Matthew Shippen Jr. (December 2, 1879 – May 20, 1968) was an American professional golfer. Shippen is best known for his success at the early U.S. Opens, finishing fifth at the 1896 U.S. Open and the 1902 U.S. Open. Shippen, of black and Native American descent, is believed to be the first American-born professional golfer.

== Early life ==
In 1879, Shippen was born in Washington, D.C.. He was the son of former slave and Presbyterian minister John Shippen Sr. and Eliza Spotswood Shippen. He is believed to be the first American-born golf professional.

When he was nine his father was sent to serve as minister on the Shinnecock Indian Reservation—close to Shinnecock Hills—one of America's earliest golf clubs. John Jr. worked as a caddie at the course and was taught to play by the club's English professional, Willie Dunn Jr.

== Professional career ==
At the age of 16, Shippen earned an assistant professional post at Shinnecock Hills Golf Club where he began giving lessons to some of the club members and became an accomplished player in his own right.

The Shinnecock Hills course was chosen to host the second U.S. Open in 1896. Shippen played superb golf, finishing in fifth place. Prior to the start of the tournament, some club members had been so impressed with Shippen's talent for the game that they decided to pay his entry fee for the tournament, along with that of his close friend, Oscar Bunn, a Shinnecock Indian.

When the professional entrants for the competition found out a racial controversy had begun, they threatened to boycott the event, but they backed down after USGA president Theodore Havemeyer stated that the tournament would proceed even if only Shippen and Bunn took part. Shippen was paired with Charles B. Macdonald, winner of the first U.S. Amateur in 1895. He was tied for second place after the first of the two rounds, and remained in contention until he drove his ball onto a sandy road at the 13th hole and scored an eleven. If he had made par on that hole, he would have made a playoff for the championship, but he still finished in a tie for sixth and won $10 as the fourth-placed non-amateur. Scottish-born James Foulis won the $150 first prize.

Shippen played in five more U.S. Opens, and his best finish was a tie for fifth in 1902. He made his career in golf and served as professional at several clubs, the last of which was Shady Rest Golf and Country Club in New Jersey, where he worked from 1932 until the club was acceded to the township of Scotch Plains in 1964. As a professional, Shippen made and sold his own clubs which bore a stamp reading "J. M. Shippen".

No other African-American played in the Open until Ted Rhodes took part in 1948.

== Death and legacy ==
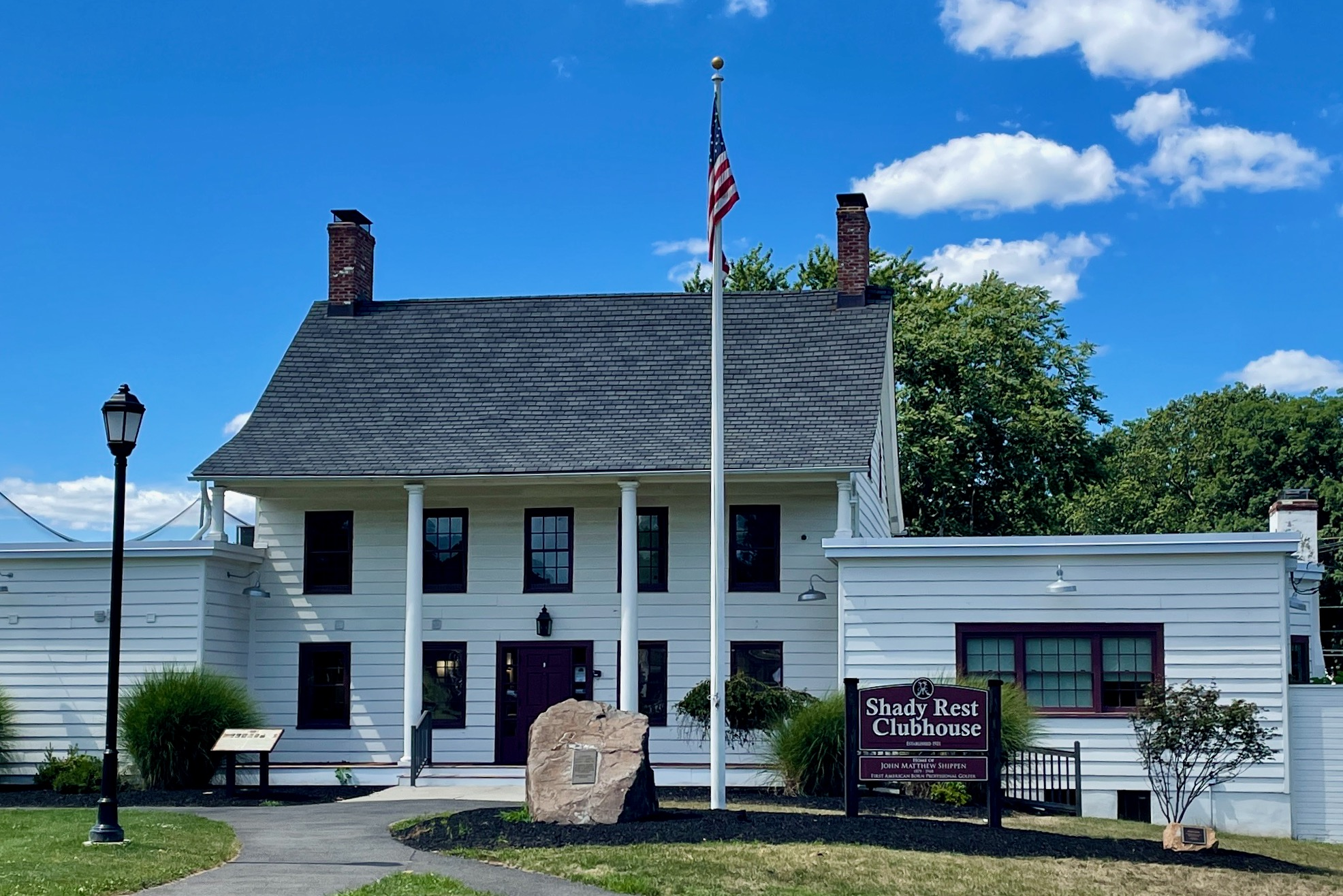
John Shippen Museum, Shady Rest Golf and Country Club

He died on May 20, 1968, at a nursing home in Newark, New Jersey. He is buried at the Rosedale Cemetery in Linden, New Jersey.

When the U.S. Open was played at Shinnecock Hills in 1986, Shippen was remembered during the ABC television broadcast. For many members of the former Shady Rest club, it was the first time they had learned of his accomplishments. The John Shippen Museum is located in the clubhouse of the Shady Rest Golf and Country Club in Scotch Plains. The John Shippen National Invitational Golf Tournament for Black Golfers was established by Intersport in 2021.

In 2009, the PGA of America granted posthumous membership to Shippen, Rhodes, and Bill Spiller who were denied the opportunity to become PGA members during their professional careers. The PGA also granted posthumous honorary membership to boxer Joe Louis.

In 2018, Shippen was posthumously inducted in to the New Jersey Hall of Fame.

== Results in major championships ==
| Tournament | 1896 | 1897 | 1898 | 1899 | 1900 | 1901 | 1902 | 1903 | 1904 |
|---|---|---|---|---|---|---|---|---|---|
| U.S. Open | T6 | | | T26 | T28 | | T5 | | |

| Tournament | 1905 | 1906 | 1907 | 1908 | 1909 | 1910 | 1911 | 1912 | 1913 |
|---|---|---|---|---|---|---|---|---|---|
| U.S. Open | | | | CUT | | | | | T41 |

Note: Shippen played only in the U.S. Open Championship.

Top 10
Did not play

CUT = missed the half way cut
"T" indicates a tie for a place.
