= Frank Strafaci =

American amateur golfer (1916–1988)

Personal information
- Full name: Frank Strafaci
- Nationality: United States
- Born: April 24, 1916 Brooklyn, New York, U.S.
- Died: 19 February 1988 (aged 71)
- Children: 2

Career
- Sport: Golf
- Status: Amateur

Best results in major championships
- Masters Tournament: 58th: 1950
- PGA Championship: DNP
- U.S. Open: 9th: 1937
- The Open Championship: DNP

Frank Strafaci (April 24, 1916 – February 19, 1988) was an American amateur golfer, who competed against the top amateurs of his time. He is remembered as one of Brooklyn's top amateur golfers.

== Early life ==
In 1916, Strafaci was born in Brooklyn, New York. He was also raised in the borough. Strafaci was one of five brothers, all of whom were top amateur golfers. His brother, Thomas U. Strafaci, was the only brother to turn professional and became the head golf pro with his son Thomas Strafaci, Jr. at Dyker Beach Golf Course in Brooklyn. His older brother Dominic was the 1941 MGA Public Links Champion winning the title at Bethpage Black.

== Career ==
Strafaci started his dominance on the amateur scene at Dyker Beach Golf Course in 1935 when he joined the Shoreview Golf Club. He won the U.S. Amateur Public Links in 1935. He won the Shoreview's Club Championship in 1936 and again in 1938. Over the next 15 years he dominated amateur golf in the area. He won the Long Island Golf Association Amateur Championship five times, the Metropolitan Amateur seven times, the North and South Amateur twice and the Richardson Invitational Championship twice. He also took his talents overseas, playing in the British and French Amateur Championships.

In 1940, Strafaci qualified for the U.S. Open. Shortly after qualifying, Strafaci learned Ben Hogan did not qualify but would be the first alternate. On May 27, a few weeks before the Open was to be held at the Canterbury Golf Club in Ohio, Strafaci issued Hogan an "Insurance Policy". In a letter to Hogan, Strafaci told him "Go ahead to Cleveland and get ready for the Open Championship. I'll see to it that you get in." Strafaci believed Hogan, one of the best players in the world, should be in the Open. By his own admission, Strafaci did not like his game even though he qualified. With no other player withdrawing, Strafaci withdrew on June 6 from the Open which enabled Hogan to play. Hogan was in contention all four rounds and would go on to finish T5.

In 1954, Strafaci played in the U.S. Amateur and had a very interesting first match opponent named Arnold Palmer; this was Palmer's final amateur appearance before turning professional. Palmer later stated that his toughest match was against Strafaci, who was all square with him entering the 17th hole. Palmer eventually beat Strafaci 1-up and went on to win the championship.

In 1957, Strafaci teamed up with his brother Thomas, the head professional at Dyker Beach Golf Club to capture the Long Island Golf Associations Amateur-Professional Championship at Nassau Country Club. This would be Frank’s second victory in this event winning it also in 1938 with professional Jimmy Hines who was the head professional at Lakeville Country Club. This event was also won in 1933 at Lido Golf Club by Strafaci’s older brother Ralph who teamed with Wiffy Cox who was the head professional at Dyker Beach GC at the time.

Strafaci semi-retired from amateur golf in the late 1950s and became Executive Director of the Florida Golf Association. In 1960, he became the Director of Golf at the famed Doral Country Club. He has been credited with naming the course the "Blue Monster".

== Personal life ==
Strafaci had one son also named Frank and a daughter named Cathy. Both of whom currently reside in Florida.

In 1988, Strafaci died in Florida.

Strafaci's grandson, Tyler Strafaci, won the 2020 North and South Amateur at Pinehurst #2 just like his grandfather did in both 1938 and 1939. He also won the 2020 U.S. Amateur.

== Amateur wins ==
- 1935 U.S. Amateur Public Links
- 1937 Hochster Memorial Tournament at Quaker Ridge CC
- 1938 Long Island Amateur, Long Island Golf Association - Amateur/Professional Championship, Metropolitan Amateur, North and South Amateur
- 1939 Metropolitan Amateur, North and South Amateur
- 1940 Dixie Amateur
- 1941 Long Island Amateur, Dixie Amateur
- 1945 Metropolitan Amateur
- 1946 Metropolitan Amateur
- 1947 Long Island Amateur, Metropolitan Amateur
- 1949 Long Island Amateur
- 1950 Metropolitan Amateur
- 1951 Long Island Amateur
- 1952 Long Island Golf Association - Richardson Invitational, Long Island Golf Association - Club Team Championship
- 1953 Long Island Golf Association - Richardson Invitational
- 1954 Metropolitan Amateur, Long Island Golf Association - Club Team Championship
- 1957 Long Island Golf Association - Amateur/Professional Championship, Florida State Amateur Championship

== Results in major championships ==
Tournament	1935	1936	1937	1938	1939
Masters Tournament				WD	
U.S. Open			9		
U.S. Amateur	R256	R32	R16	R16	R64
The Amateur Championship					

Tournament	1940	1941	1942	1943	1944	1945	1946	1947	1948	1949
Masters Tournament				NT	NT	NT				
U.S. Open			NT	NT	NT	NT	CUT			
U.S. Amateur	R16	R32	NT	NT	NT	NT		QF	R256	QF
The Amateur Championship	NT	NT	NT	NT	NT	NT				

Tournament	1950	1951	1952	1953	1954	1955	1956	1957	1958
Masters Tournament	58								
U.S. Open									
U.S. Amateur		R128	R64	R64	R256	R128		R128	
The Amateur Championship	R256	R256	R16	R128	R64	R64	R128	R64	R32

Note: Strafaci never played in The Open Championship or the PGA Championship.

Top 10
Did not play

NT = no tournament
WD = withdrew
"T" indicates a tie for a place
R256, R128, R64, R32, R16, QF, SF = round in which player lost in match play

Source for The Masters: www.masters.com

Source for U.S. Open and U.S. Amateur: USGA Championship Database

Source for 1950 British Amateur: The Glasgow Herald, May 24, 1950, pg. 7.

Source for 1951 British Amateur: The Glasgow Herald, May 22, 1951, pg. 6.

Source for 1952 British Amateur: The Glasgow Herald, May 30, 1952, pg. 2.

Source for 1953 British Amateur: The Glasgow Herald, May 28, 1953, pg. 4.

Source for 1954 British Amateur: The Glasgow Herald, May 27, 1954, pg. 4.

Source for 1955 British Amateur: The Glasgow Herald, June 2, 1955, pg. 4.

Source for 1956 British Amateur: The Glasgow Herald, May 30, 1956, pg. 4.

Source for 1957 British Amateur: The Glasgow Herald, May 29, 1957, pg. 4.

Source for 1958 British Amateur: The Glasgow Herald, June 5, 1958, pg. 4.

Source for “Blue Monster“ Naming: NY Times Online Edition March 16, 2008 Sports Section article by Larry Dorman Event’s Stars: Monster and Woods
