= Lucy Barnes Brown =

American golfer

Personal information
- Full name: Lucy Barnes Brown
- Nationality: United States
- Born: March 16, 1859 New York City, New York, U.S.
- Died: September 30, 1921 (aged 62)

Career
- Sport: Golf
- Status: Amateur

Lucy Barnes Brown (née Lucy Nevins Barnes) (March 16, 1859 – September 30, 1921) was an early American amateur golfer, known for winning the inaugural U.S. Women's Amateur in 1895.

== Career ==
Barnes was born in New York City. She married Charles Stelle Brown in 1880 and competed in the 1895 tournament as Mrs. Charles S. Brown representing Shinnecock Hills Golf Club. Shinnecock Hills at the time had club members named Barnes, and the United States Golf Association (USGA) speculates that Mrs. Brown was their daughter.

The USGA had just been formed in late 1894, and earlier in 1895 had held the inaugural U.S. Amateur and U.S. Open. On November 9, 1895, they held the first U.S. Women's Amateur championship at the Meadow Brook Club in the Town of Hempstead, New York. The tournament that year was an 18-hole stroke play event (match play, used today, started the following year). Thirteen women competed, and Mrs. Brown won the tournament with a score of 132, defeating Nellie C. Sargent by two strokes. The score of 132 was the women's course record at the time. Mrs. Brown did not compete in the Women's Amateur again.

== Personal life ==
Her husband, Charles S. Brown, founded a real estate company in 1873 which is still active today as Brown Harris Stevens LLC.

One of their children, Archibald M. Brown, was later president of Shinnecock Hills Golf Club. The couple was still living in Manhattan in 1920.

== Amateur wins ==
- 1895 U.S. Women's Amateur
