= Harry Turpie =

Scottish-American golfer

Personal information
- Full name: Henry Spence Turpie
- Nickname: Harry
- Nationality: Scotland; United States
- Born: 9 September 1875 St Andrews, Scotland
- Died: 18 December 1945 (aged 70) New Orleans, Louisiana
- Spouse: Augusta H. Turpie

Career
- Sport: Golf
- Status: Professional
- Professional wins: 1

Best results in major championships
- Masters Tournament: DNP
- PGA Championship: DNP
- U.S. Open: 8th: 1900, 1902
- The Open Championship: T31: 1895

Henry Spence Turpie (9 September 1875 – 18 December 1945) was a Scottish-American professional golfer. He had two top-10 finishes in golf major championship tournaments. Turpie finished T5 in the 1909 Western Open, shooting a course record tying 69 in the final round.

== Early life ==
Turpie was born on 9 September 1875 a few blocks from the Old Course at St Andrews, Scotland, to shoemaker Henry Turpie and his wife Margaret Turpie (née Allan). Like nearly all the golf professionals of his era, he was also a club maker. In the late 19th century he emigrated to the United States and became a naturalized citizen. One of his first jobs was head professional at Edgewater Country Club near Chicago. In 1898 his brother George, also a professional golfer, would make the Atlantic crossing to join him at Edgewater as an assistant.

== Golf career ==
=== 1895 Open Championship ===
Prior to his emigration to America, Turpie was a competitor in the 1895 Open Championship which was the 35th Open Championship, held 12–13 June at the Old Course at St Andrews, Fife, Scotland. Defending champion J. H. Taylor won the Championship for the second time, by four strokes from runner-up Sandy Herd. Turpie finished the tournament tied for 31st place. In 1896 he played in the same tournament and finished 37th.

=== Oconomowoc Tournament ===
In August 1899 Turpie won a well-attended professional tournament hosted by the Oconomowoc Country Club in Oconomowoc, Wisconsin. He prevailed over a host of excellent players, including Alex Smith, Fred Herd, James Foulis, David Foulis, Willie Smith, and others. Turpie shot 151 over the four 9-hole rounds played and finished one stroke ahead of Alex Smith. With golf being a relatively new sport for American spectators in the late 19th century, the play by the professionals was enjoyed by fans more used to yachting events.

=== U.S. Open ===
Turpie had early success in America when he placed eighth in the 1900 U.S. Open, held 4–5 October 1900, at Chicago Golf Club in Wheaton, Illinois. He carded rounds of 84-87-79-84=334 and won $25. He posted an identical eighth-place finish in the 1902 U.S. Open held October 10–11 at Garden City Golf Club in Garden City, New York, on Long Island, east of New York City. He posted scores of 79-85-78-78=320 and won $50 in prize money.

== Later life ==
By 12 September 1918, at the age of 43, he was living in Bogalusa, Louisiana, when he registered for the draft in World War I.

== Death ==
Turpie died on 18 December 1945 at the age of 70. He had a heart attack while heading to his work at a driving range in City Park, New Orleans. He was survived by his wife and a son, Henry S. Turpie.

== Results in major championships ==
Tournament	1895	1896	1897	1898	1899	1900	1901	1902	1903	1904	1905	1906	1907	1908	1909	1910	1911
U.S. Open	?	?	14	12	T18	8	T22	8	23	T20	T32	T13	?	?	?	?	T12
The Open Championship	T31	37	DNP	DNP	DNP	DNP	DNP	DNP	DNP	DNP	DNP	DNP	DNP	DNP	DNP	DNP	DNP

Note: Turpie played only in the U.S. Open and The Open Championship.

DNP = Did not play
? = unknown
"T" indicates a tie for a place
Yellow background for top-10
