= North and South Men's Amateur Golf Championship =

Annual golf tournament

The North and South Men's Amateur Golf Championship, commonly known as the North and South Amateur, is an annual golf tournament held since 1901 at the Pinehurst Resort in Pinehurst, North Carolina, US. An invitational tournament, participants are chosen based upon their performance in national amateur championships and overall competitive record.

== History ==
In 1921, Buck Merriman, a former member of the Yale Bulldogs golf team, won the event.

In December 2021, the North and South Amateur joined with six other tournaments to form the Elite Amateur Golf Series.

== Winners ==
- 2026 Joshua Bai
- 2025 Carlos Astiazaran
- 2024 Davis Ovard
- 2023 Nick Dunlap
- 2022 Luke Clanton
- 2021 Louis Dobbelaar
- 2020 Tyler Strafaci
- 2019 Cooper Dossey
- 2018 Ben Schlottman
- 2017 William Nottingham
- 2016 Timothy Conover
- 2015 Sean Walsh
- 2014 Michael Cromie
- 2013 Andrew Dorn
- 2012 Peter Williamson
- 2011 Jack Fields
- 2010 Donald Constable
- 2009 David Chung
- 2008 Matt Savage
- 2007 Phillip Mollica
- 2006 Brady Schnell
- 2005 Sean Moore
- 2004 Martin Ureta
- 2003 Chris Stroud
- 2002 Eric Jorgensen
- 2001 Michael Sims
- 2000 David Eger
- 1999 James Driscoll
- 1998 Tim Jackson
- 1997 Jake Kransteuber
- 1996 Paul M. Simson
- 1995 Paul M. Simson
- 1994 Mark Slawter
- 1993 Kelly Mitchum
- 1992 Duane Bock
- 1991 David Eger
- 1990 Tom Scherrer
- 1989 Lee Porter
- 1988 Ulysses Grisette
- 1987 Robert Goettlicher
- 1986 Billy Andrade
- 1985 Jack Nicklaus II
- 1984 Davis Love III
- 1983 Bryan Sullivan
- 1982 Keith Clearwater
- 1981 Corey Pavin
- 1980 Hal Sutton
- 1979 John McGough
- 1978 Gary Hallberg
- 1977 Gary Hallberg
- 1976 Curtis Strange
- 1975 Curtis Strange
- 1974 George Burns
- 1973 Mike Ford
- 1972 Danny Edwards
- 1971 Eddie Pearce
- 1970 Gary Cowan
- 1969 Joe Inman
- 1968 Jack Lewis Jr.
- 1967 William C. Campbell
- 1966 Ward Wettlaufer
- 1965 Tom Draper
- 1964 Dale Morey
- 1963 Billy Joe Patton
- 1962 Billy Joe Patton
- 1961 Bill Hyndman
- 1960 Charlie Smith
- 1959 Jack Nicklaus
- 1958 Dick Chapman
- 1957 William C. Campbell
- 1956 Hillman Robbins
- 1955 Don Bisplinghoff
- 1954 Billy Joe Patton
- 1953 William C. Campbell
- 1952 Frank Stranahan
- 1951 Hobart Manley, Jr.
- 1950 William C. Campbell
- 1949 Frank Stranahan
- 1948 Harvie Ward
- 1947 Charles B. Dudley
- 1946 Frank Stranahan
- 1945 Ed Furgol
- 1944 Mal Galletta
- 1943 Harry Offutt
- 1942 George Dunlap
- 1941 Skip Alexander
- 1940 George Dunlap
- 1939 Frank Strafaci
- 1938 Frank Strafaci
- 1937 Bobby Dunkelberger
- 1936 George Dunlap
- 1935 George Dunlap
- 1934 George Dunlap
- 1933 George Dunlap
- 1932 M. Pierpont Warner
- 1931 George Dunlap
- 1930 Eugene V. Homans
- 1929 George Voight
- 1928 George Voight
- 1927 George Voight
- 1926 Page Hufty
- 1925 Arthur W. Yates
- 1924 Fred W. Knight
- 1923 Frank C. Newton
- 1922 Henry J. Topping
- 1921 B. P. Merriman
- 1920 Francis Ouimet
- 1919 Edward C. Beall
- 1918 Irving S. Robeson
- 1917 Norman H. Maxwell
- 1916 Philip V. G. Carter
- 1915 Fillmore K. Robeson
- 1914 Reginald S. Worthington
- 1913 Henry J. Topping
- 1912 Walter Travis
- 1911 Chick Evans
- 1910 Walter Travis
- 1909 James D. Standish, Jr.
- 1908 Allan Lard
- 1907 Allan Lard
- 1906 Warren Wood
- 1905 L. Lee Harban
- 1904 Walter Travis
- 1903 T. Sterling Beckwith
- 1902 Charles Cory
- 1901 George C. Dutton

== See also ==
- North and South Open
- North and South Women's Amateur Golf Championship
