= George Zahringer =

American golfer and stockbroker (born 1953)

George Zahringer III (born April 23, 1953 in Saginaw, Michigan) is an amateur golfer.

== Career ==
Zahringer is from New York, New York. He attended Stonehill College.

For his career, he has worked as a stockbroker. He also won a number of notable local amateur and professional golf tournaments, including the Long Island Amateur, Metropolitan Amateur, and Metropolitan Open.

== Tournament wins ==
this list may be incomplete

- 1980 Long Island Amateur
- 1982 Metropolitan Amateur, Long Island Amateur
- 1984 Metropolitan Amateur, New York State Amateur
- 1985 Metropolitan Amateur, Metropolitan Open (as an amateur)
- 1986 Metropolitan Amateur
- 1987 Metropolitan Amateur
- 2002 U.S. Mid-Amateur
- 2013 British Senior Amateur
- 2015 MET Senior Amateur

== Major tournament appearances ==
- U.S. Senior Open seven times - best finish: T31 (2005)
- 2003 Masters Tournament

== U.S. national team appearances ==
- Walker Cup: 2003
