= Tom Hutchison (golfer) =

Scottish golfer

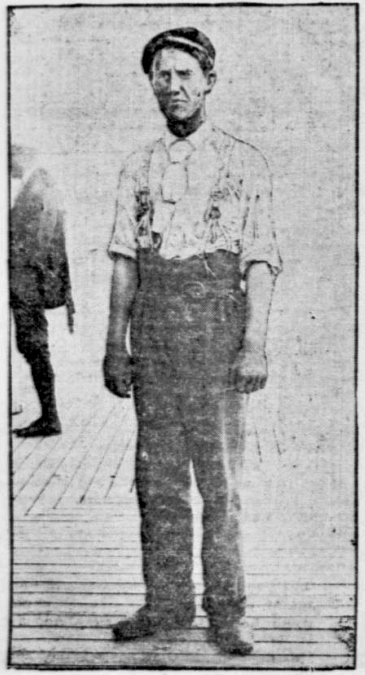
- Photo from New York Daily Tribune, 13 December 1900

Personal information
- Full name: Thomas Hutchison
- Nationality: Scotland
- Born: 6 October 1877 St Andrews, Scotland
- Died: 8 December 1900 (aged 23) Cumberland Island, Georgia

Career
- Sport: Golf
- Status: Professional

Best results in major championships
- Masters Tournament: DNP
- PGA Championship: DNP
- U.S. Open: 7th: 1900
- The Open Championship: 22nd: 1899

Thomas Hutchison (6 October 1877 – 8 December 1900) was a Scottish professional golfer. Hutchison placed seventh in the 1900 U.S. Open, held 4–5 October 1900, at Chicago Golf Club in Wheaton, Illinois. At the time, he was a touring professional playing out of Shinnecock Hills Golf Club.

== Early life ==
Tom Hutchison was born in St Andrews, Scotland, on 6 October 1877 to William and Helen Hutchison (née Falls). He had a younger brother, Jock Hutchison, who was also a fine professional golfer.

== Golf career ==
Hutchison finished seventh in the 1900 U.S. Open, held 4–5 October 1900, at Chicago Golf Club in Wheaton, Illinois. On 20 September 1900, Hutchison partnered with George Low in a 36-hole best ball match on the Morris County links in Morristown, New Jersey. They turned in a stellar card, defeating the celebrated British professional Harry Vardon by the score of 7 and 6.

== Death and legacy ==
Hutchison died on 8 December 1900 after a horse riding accident on Stafford Place links at Cumberland Island on the southeastern coast of Georgia, where he was a guest of William Coleman Carnegie. Carnegie was a golf enthusiast and had a private golf course on Cumberland Island where Hutchison could hone his skills. For some unknown reason, he was buried on Cumberland Island and not sent back to Scotland. Since he was not a Carnegie, he was not buried in the Carnegie family cemetery, but instead at the Stafford cemetery. The Stafford family was long gone and had sold their land to the Carnegies. Newspaper reports from the 12 December 1900 issue of the Brooklyn Daily Eagle and the 13 December 1900 issue of the New York Daily Tribune puts his date of death to 11 December, but his gravestone on Cumberland Island says 8 December.
