= 1902 U.S. Open (golf) =

Golf tournament

Coordinates: 40.726°N 73.643°W

Tournament information
- Dates: October 10–11, 1902
- Location: Garden City, New York
- Course: Garden City Golf Club
- Organized by: USGA
- Format: Stroke play − 72 holes

Statistics
- Field: 83
- Cut: none
- Winner's share: $200

Champion
- (Scotland) Laurie Auchterlonie
- 307

Location in the United States
Location in New York

The 1902 U.S. Open was the eighth U.S. Open, held October 10–11 at Garden City Golf Club in Garden City, New York, on Long Island, east of New York City. Laurie Auchterlonie established a new 72-hole U.S. Open scoring record to win his only major title, six strokes ahead of Stewart Gardner and amateur Walter Travis.

Auchterlonie posted rounds of 78-78-74-77 and became the first in U.S. Open history to card four sub-80 rounds. His 307 total was six shots better than the previous championship record, set by Harry Vardon in 1900.

Clear skies greeted the field on Friday for the first two rounds. The weather worsened on Saturday, with cloudy skies in the morning and a pouring rain in the afternoon. The adverse playing conditions didn't seem to affect the scoring; in fact many players played well in the final round in the rain. John Shippen, playing out of Marine Field Club in New York, became the first American-born player to finish in the money in a U.S. Open.

The improvement in scores were in large part due to the introduction of the Haskell golf ball, which soon replaced the gutta-percha ball as the prominent golf ball in use.

== Round summaries ==
=== First round ===
Friday, October 10, 1902 (morning)

Place	Player	Score
1	(Scotland) Jack Campbell	77
2	(Scotland) Laurie Auchterlonie	78
T3	(Scotland) Willie Anderson	79
T3	(Wales) Arthur Griffiths	79
T3	(Scotland) Jack Park	79
T3	(Scotland) Alex Smith	79
T3	(Scotland) Harry Turpie	79
T8	(Scotland) David Brown	80
T8	(Scotland) Donald Ross	80
T8	(Scotland) Charles Thorn	80

=== Second round ===
Friday, October 10, 1902 (afternoon)

Place	Player	Score
1	(Scotland) Laurie Auchterlonie	78-78=156
2	(Scotland) Stewart Gardner	82-76=158
3	(Scotland) Alex Ross	80-83=160
T4	(Scotland) Willie Anderson	79-82=161
T4	(Scotland) Willie Smith	82-79=161
6	(Scotland) Charles Thorn	80-82=162
7	(Scotland) Donald Ross	80-83=163
T8	(Scotland) David Hunter	83-81=164
T8	(United States) John Shippen	83-81=164
T8	(United States) Walter Travis (a)	82-82=164
T8	(Scotland) Harry Turpie	79-85=164

=== Third round ===
Saturday, October 11, 1902 (morning)

Place	Player	Score
1	(Scotland) Laurie Auchterlonie	78-78-74=230
2	(Scotland) Stewart Gardner	82-76-77=235
3	(Scotland) Willie Anderson	79-82-76=237
T4	(United States) John Shippen	83-81-75=239
T4	(United States) Walter Travis (a)	82-82-75=239
T6	(Scotland) Donald Ross	80-83-78=241
T6	(Scotland) Willie Smith	82-79-80=241
T8	(Scotland) Jack Campbell	77-87-79=243
T8	(Scotland) Charles Thorn	80-82-80=242
T8	(Scotland) Harry Turpie	79-85-78=242

=== Final round ===
Saturday, October 11, 1902 (afternoon)

Place	Player	Score	Money ($)
1	(Scotland) Laurie Auchterlonie	78-78-74-77=307	200
T2	(Scotland) Stewart Gardner	82-76-77-78=313	150
T2	(United States) Walter Travis (a)	82-82-75-74=313	0
4	(Scotland) Willie Smith	82-79-80-75=316	125
T5	(Scotland) Willie Anderson	79-82-76-81=318	90
T5	(United States) John Shippen	83-81-75-79=318	90
7	(Scotland) Charles Thorn	80-82-80-77=319	70
8	(Scotland) Harry Turpie	79-85-78-78=320	50
9	(Scotland) Donald Ross	80-83-78-81=322	40
10	(Scotland) Alex Ross	83-77-84-79=323	30

Amateurs: Travis (313), Murphy (341), Watson (345), Livingston (348), Seeley (353),
Lockwood (356), Macdonald (357), Croker (360).
