= Garden City Hotel =

Hotel in Garden City, New York, United States

Coordinates: 40°43′28″N 73°38′26″W

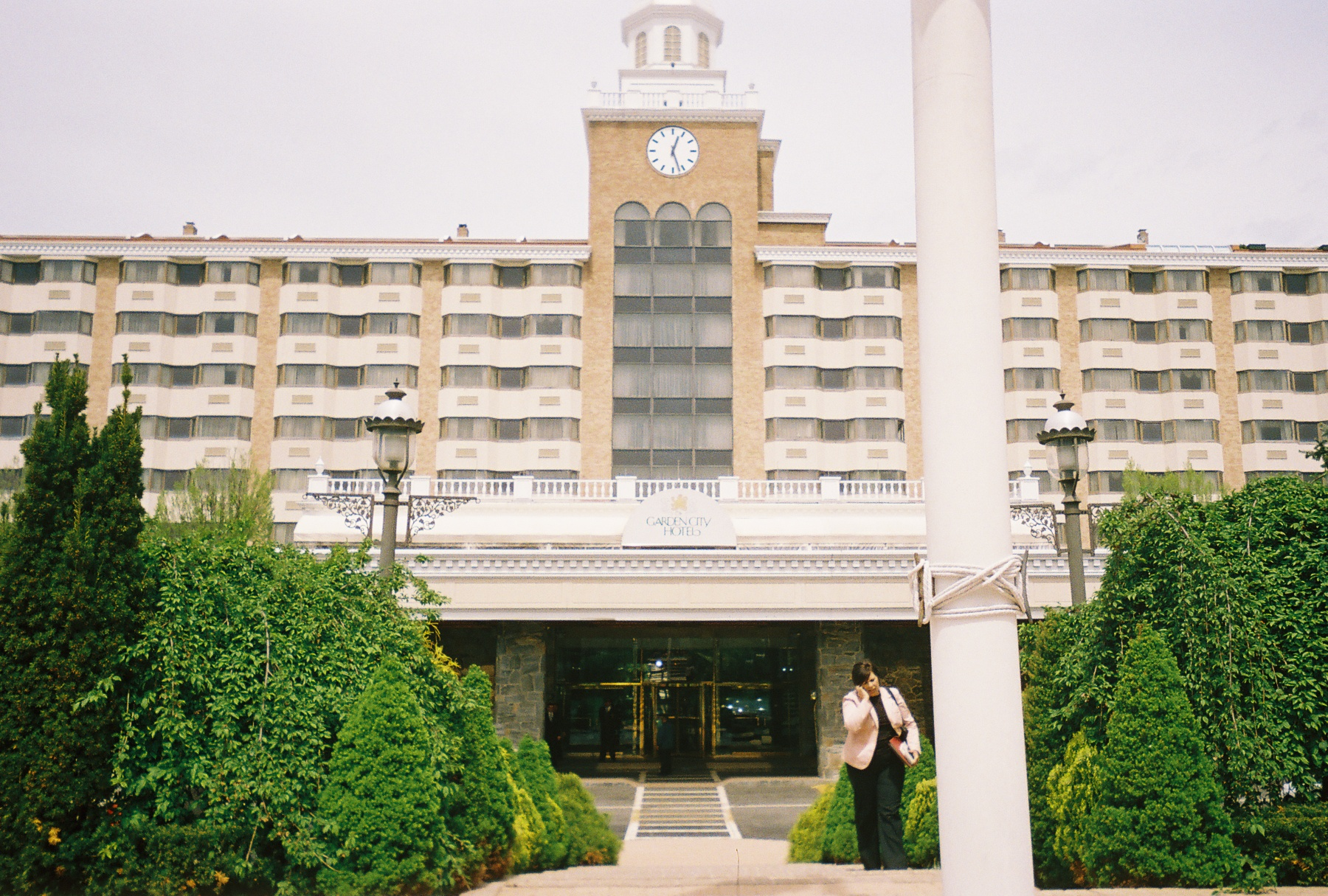
- The main entrance to the Garden City Hotel

General information
- Location: Garden City, New York, United States, 45 Seventh Street
- Opening: 1874 (first building); 1895 (second building); 1901 (third building); May 20, 1983 (current building)
- Destroyed: 1899 (second building); 1973 (third building)
- Owner: The Fortuna Realty Group

Other information
- Number of rooms: 269
- Number of suites: 16
- Number of restaurants: 5

Website
- Official website

The Garden City Hotel is a historic, 269-room hotel located within the Incorporated Village of Garden City, on Long Island, in New York, United States. Founded in 1874, it celebrated its 150th anniversary in 2024. The current structure is the fourth to bear the name, and opened in 1983.

== History ==
=== Original building ===
The first Garden City Hotel opened on July 30, 1874. It was constructed by millionaire Alexander Turney Stewart at a cost of $150,000. Stewart managed the hotel until his death in 1876. His widow Cornelia managed the hotel until her own death in 1886. The hotel passed to Cornelia Stewart's family, who formed The Garden City Company to manage the property. Architect Stanford White was elected to the board.

=== Second building ===
The second Garden City Hotel opened in 1895, designed by White's renowned firm, McKim, Mead and White. It was built in the Dutch Colonial style, with a cupola modeled after the one at Philadelphia's Independence Hall. A nine-hole golf course was added in May 1897. It later became the Garden City Golf Club. The hotel burned to the ground on the morning of September 7, 1899.

=== Third building ===
The third and most famous incarnation of the Garden City Hotel opened in 1901. It was again designed by McKim, Mead and White, this time in the Georgian Revival style. It was a host to the elite high society families like the Vanderbilts and the Pierpont Morgans. The hotel was enlarged in 1911, with new wings on each side, designed by the firm of Ford, Butler & Oliver. Charles Lindbergh, rented a room at the hotel on May 20, 1927, the night before his famous transatlantic flight to Paris. However, despite legend, he did not actually use the room, instead taking a three-hour nap at the nearby home of a friend on 105 Third Street.

The Knott Hotel Corporation bought the hotel in 1948 and renovated it extensively. The hotel was purchased by developer Michael A. Forte in 1965 for $2.6 million. After years of financial losses, he closed the aging 400-room hotel on July 15, 1972. He announced numerous plans to redevelop the site with a combination hotel/office usage, all of which were turned down by the village's board of trustees, before they agreed on a modern 500-room hotel and a separate building with 305 luxury condominiums. The planned replacement complex was designed by Thomas E. Stanley, architect of Manhattan's Gulf and Western Building. The Garden City Hotel's contents were sold, with a collector in Levittown buying the entire contents of the Lindbergh suite. Forte demolished the hotel on January 15, 1973. Forte went bankrupt before he could construct the replacement buildings, and the site remained vacant for years.

=== Current building ===
Developer Myron Nelkin eventually purchased the land and built the fourth Garden City Hotel, which opened on May 20, 1983. Nelkin died in 2007 and the Nelkin family sold the hotel on September 20, 2012 to Morris Moinian of The Fortuna Realty Group. The property underwent a $35 million renovation in 2014.

The current hotel building contains 269 guest rooms – including 16 suites. It also features approximately 30,000 square feet (2,800 m^{2}) of event space, a private club on the top floor, and five restaurants.

The Garden City Hotel is a member of Preferred Hotels and Resorts Worldwide.

== Famous guests ==
The hotel has hosted many world leaders and celebrities, including John F. Kennedy, Margaret Thatcher, Hillary Clinton, George H. W. Bush, Prince Khalid of Saudi Arabia, Charles Lindbergh, and Irish Taoiseach Garret FitzGerald.

== See also ==
- Jake's 58 Hotel & Casino
- Long Island Aquarium
- Resorts World New York City
