= Stewart Gardner =

Scottish-American professional golfer (1878–1931)

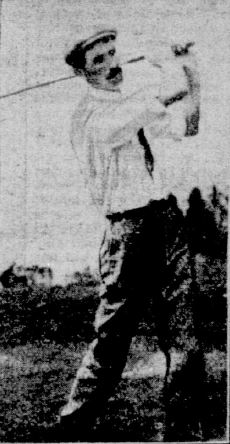
- Gardner (c. 1905)

Personal information
- Full name: Stewart Orr Gardner
- Nationality: Scotland; United States
- Born: 31 October 1878 Troon, Scotland
- Died: 12 April 1931 (aged 52) Highland Park, Illinois

Career
- Sport: Golf
- Turned professional: c. 1899

Best results in major championships
- PGA Championship: DNP
- U.S. Open: T2: 1902
- The Open Championship: DNP

Stewart Orr Gardner^{†} (31 October 1878 – 12 April 1931) was a Scottish-American professional golfer who played in the late 19th and early 20th century. He had seven top-10 finishes in the U.S. Open. His best performance was a T2 finish in the 1902 U.S. Open. In 1924 he served as vice president at large of the PGA of America.

== Early life ==
Gardner was born on 31 October 1878 in Troon, Scotland, the son of Robert Gardner and Agnes Gardner (née Snoddy) who were both born in Ireland. He grew to be a tall man, and had blue eyes and brown hair. He emigrated to the United States in 1899 and on 6 November 1919 he applied for, and was granted, U.S. citizenship. He registered for the draft during World War I on 12 September 1918 but it is unknown whether he saw any combat since the war would be over only two months later. He occasionally took trips back to Scotland, presumably to visit his mother and other family members, but would then return to the U.S. One such trip was aboard the SS Cameronia which left Glasgow on 28 February 1914 and arrived in New York on 9 March 1914.

== Golf career ==
Gardner was best known for a strong finish in the 1902 U.S. Open where he finished tied second with Walter Travis, but a distant six shots behind winner Laurie Auchterlonie. Gardner placed third in the 1903 U.S. Open and ninth in the 1900 U.S. Open. Gardner also finished fourth in the 1901 U.S. Open held at Myopia Hunt Club. In 1901 the Myopia Hunt Club course played extraordinarily difficult; no players in the event broke 80.

Gardner was one of the first of a large group of Scottish golf professionals to come to America around the turn of the 19th century. He arrived in the United States in 1899 and took his first position at Lenox, Massachusetts. He served as head professional at Garden City Golf Club on Long Island, New York, but his longest stint was a 10-year posting at Exmoor Country Club. In his prime, he won many tournaments between 1901 and 1904.

In 1905 he was tied for the lead after the first day in the U.S. Open with Alex Smith but he had a third round 85 and eventually finished fifth. In 1909 he was runner-up in the Western Open, nine shots behind winner Willie Anderson. The Western Open was considered to be a major tournament in the early 20th century.

== Death and legacy ==
By 1930 Gardner was single and rooming with the Alfred Stupple family in Highland Park, Illinois. Gardner died at his home in Highland Park on 12 April 1931 after a lingering illness at the age of 52. He is best remembered for a T2 finish in the 1902 U.S. Open. He was buried at North Shore Cemetery in Chicago, Illinois.

== Results in major championships ==
Tournament	1900	1901	1902	1903	1904	1905	1906	1907
U.S. Open	9	4	T2	3	T6	5	7	21

Note: Gardner played only in the U.S. Open.

"T" indicates a tie for a place
Yellow background for top-10

== Notes ==
^{†} It is possible that Gardner's middle name might be "Owen" as shown on his draft registration card.
