= Brassie =

Golf club (wood No. 2)

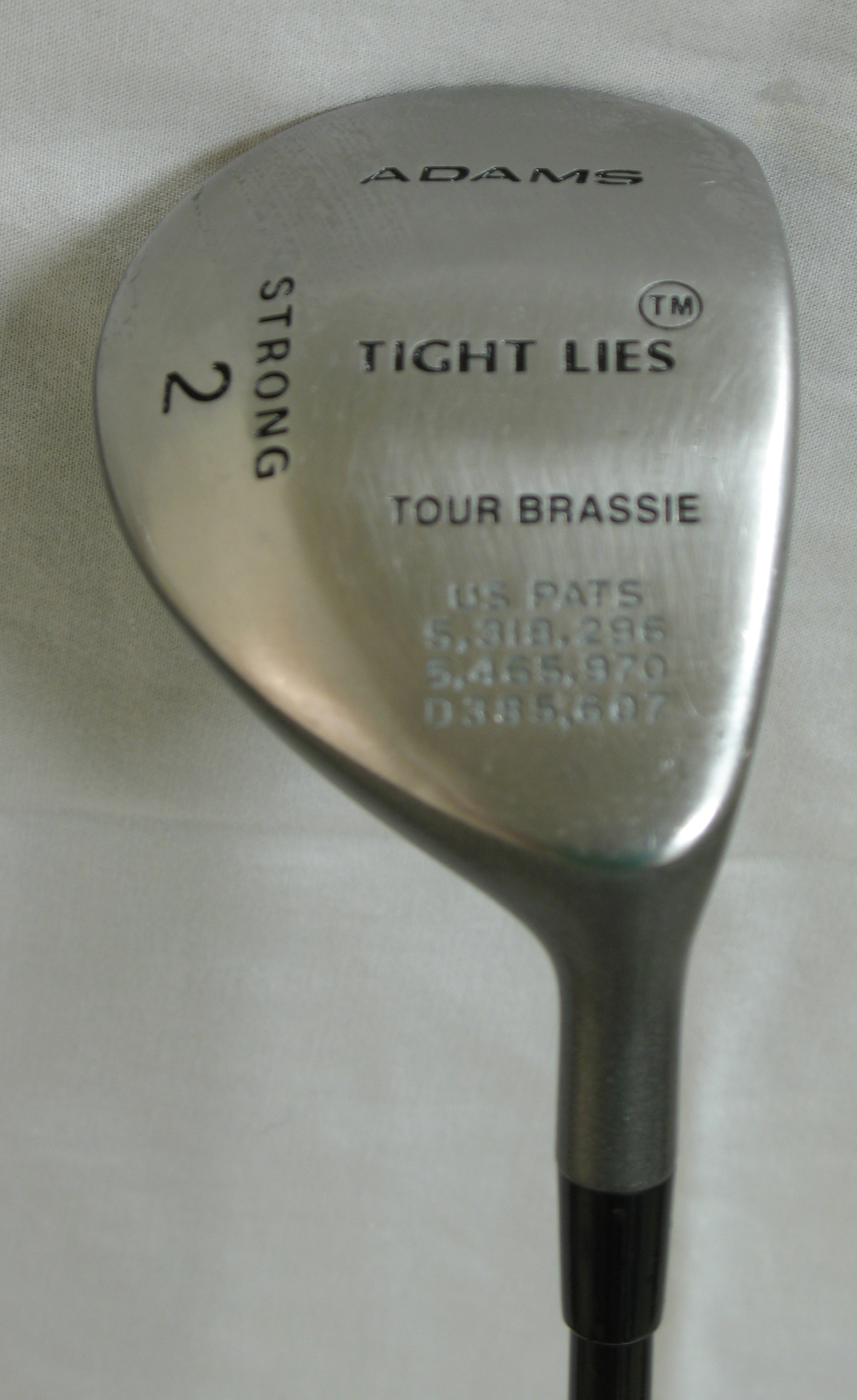
A Strong 2 wood

Brassie is the old traditional name for a wood No. 2 golf club. Brassies have a loft that is higher than that of a driver, but less than a 3 wood.

== History ==
It was the second longest club in the bag and was made especially for long shots out of bad lies and from hard ground.

The name brassie comes from its soleplate made out of brass, an alloy of copper and zinc. The dense soleplate gives the brassie a lower center of gravity and lifts up the ball faster and easier than with a traditional driver.

The brassie was very different from a modern 2-wood; but in loft, appearance and use, the brassie is the antique club that is most related to a 2-wood. "Brassie" is most commonly applied to pre-20th Century times.

== Today ==
The brassie did not find the way into modern golf bags because of its limited use.

Tour Brassie by Taylor Made In the 1980s TaylorMade-Adidas came up with a model range of metal woods and to push the market launch they gave their clubs historic names. So the Brassie came back named as the Taylor Made Tour Brassie (Wood No. 2).

== Tour Brassie by Adams ==
In the 1990s Adams introduced the Tight Lies Tour Brassie as a low lofted fairway wood named STRONG 2.

Today's 2 woods generally have a loft between 14° and 11° and they have a smaller clubhead than the modern drivers. Some of the newest 2 wood models are named Mini Drivers (Taylor Made Mini Driver, Callaway Mini Driver) by manufacturer.

== List of historic golf club names and their modern pendant ==
Historic	Today
Driver	Driver
Brassie	Wood 2
Spoon	Wood 3
Baffy	Wood 4
Cleek / Driving Iron	Iron 1
Mid Iron	Iron 2
Mid Mashie	Iron 3
Mashie Iron	Iron 4
Mashie	Iron 5
Spade Mashie	Iron 6
Mashie Niblick	Iron 7
Lofter	Iron 8
Niblick	Iron 9
Jigger	Pitching Wedge
