= 1900 U.S. Open (golf) =

Coordinates: 41.849°N 88.115°W

Tournament information
- Dates: October 4–5, 1900
- Location: Wheaton, Illinois
- Course: Chicago Golf Club
- Organized by: USGA
- Format: Stroke play − 72 holes

Statistics
- Field: 62
- Cut: none
- Prize fund: $800
- Winner's share: $200

Champion
- (Jersey) Harry Vardon
- 313

Location in the United States
Location in Illinois

The 1900 U.S. Open was the sixth U.S. Open, held October 4–5 at Chicago Golf Club in Wheaton, Illinois, a suburb west of Chicago. On a tour of the United States from Britain, Harry Vardon won his only U.S. Open title, two strokes ahead of his great rival, J.H. Taylor.

In the U.S. to promote the Vardon Flyer Ball, Vardon made his first appearance at the U.S. Open. Taylor was also in America on business and decided to enter, creating a highly anticipated matchup between the two great British rivals. Together they formed two-thirds of the Great Triumvirate that dominated British golf at the turn of the century (the third, James Braid, never played in the U.S. Open).

On Thursday morning, Taylor opened with 76 for a two-shot lead, but an 82 in the afternoon put him one back of Vardon after 36 holes. On Friday morning, Vardon's 76 opened up a four-stroke lead over Taylor, who was seven clear of the field. Despite an 80 in the afternoon for 313, Vardon prevailed by two, as Taylor shot 78 for 315. Local Chicago pro David Bell was a distant third at 322.

Neither Vardon nor Taylor won another major outside The Open Championship, which they won a combined eleven times. Vardon did not play in the U.S. Open again until 1913, when he and Ted Ray lost a playoff to amateur Francis Ouimet. He was also runner-up in his third and final Open appearance, in 1920. Taylor played the U.S. Open only once more, also in 1913, and was thirtieth.

== Course ==
Hole	Name	Yards	Par	Hole	Name	Yards	Par
1	Burn	460	5	10	Pond (In)	140	3
2	East	330	4	11	Lodge (In)	270	4
3	Corner	340	4	12	Hillside	330	4
4	Gables	415	4	13	Long (In)	500	5
5	Far	320	4	14	Mound	290	4
6	Long (Out)	520	5	15	Gopher	350	4
7	Lodge (Out)	285	4	16	Horseshoe	310	4
8	Ginger Ale	260	4	17	Home View	320	4
9	Pond (Out)	160	3	18	Home	420	5
Out		3,090	37	In		2,930	37
Total		6,020	74				

== Round summaries ==
=== First round ===
Thursday, October 4, 1900 (morning)

Place	Player	Score
1	(England) J.H. Taylor	76
2	(Scotland) David Bell	78
3	(Jersey) Harry Vardon	79
4	(Scotland) Tom Hutchinson	81
5	(Scotland) Willie Smith	82
6	(Scotland) Willie Anderson	83
T7	(Scotland) Laurie Auchterlonie	84
T7	(Scotland) Val Fitzjohn	84
T7	(Scotland) George Low	84
T7	(Scotland) Bobby Simpson	84
T7	(Scotland) Harry Turpie	84

=== Second round ===
Thursday, October 4, 1900 (afternoon)

Place	Player	Score
1	(Jersey) Harry Vardon	79-78=157
2	(England) J.H. Taylor	76-82=158
3	(Scotland) David Bell	78-83=161
T4	(Scotland) Alex Campbell	86-77=163
T4	(Scotland) Stewart Gardner	85-78=163
6	(Scotland) George Low	84-80=164
7	(Scotland) Willie Smith	82-83=165
8	(Scotland) Laurie Auchterlonie	84-82=166
9	(Scotland) Val Fitzjohn	84-83=167
T10	(Scotland) Tom Hutchinson	81-87=168
T10	(Scotland) Bobby Simpson	84-84=168

=== Third round ===
Friday, October 5, 1900 (morning)

Place	Player	Score
1	(Jersey) Harry Vardon	79-78-76=233
2	(England) J.H. Taylor	76-82-79=237
T3	(Scotland) David Bell	78-83-83=244
T3	(Scotland) Willie Smith	82-83-79=244
5	(Scotland) Laurie Auchterlonie	84-82-80=246
6	(Scotland) Stewart Gardner	85-78-84=247
7	(Scotland) Tom Hutchinson	81-87-81=249
T8	(Scotland) Willie Anderson	83-88-79=250
T8	(Scotland) George Low	84-80-85=250
T8	(Scotland) Harry Turpie	84-87-79=250

=== Final round ===
Friday, October 5, 1900 (afternoon)

Place	Player	Score	Money ($)
1	(Jersey) Harry Vardon	79-78-76-80=313	200
2	(England) J.H. Taylor	76-82-79-78=315	150
3	(Scotland) David Bell	78-83-83-78=322	125
T4	(Scotland) Laurie Auchterlonie	84-82-80-81=327	90
T4	(Scotland) Willie Smith	82-83-79-83=327	90
6	(Scotland) George Low	84-80-85-82=331	70
7	(Scotland) Tom Hutchinson	81-87-81-84=333	50
8	(Scotland) Harry Turpie	84-87-79-84=334	25
9	(Scotland) Stewart Gardner	85-78-84-89=336	0
10	(Scotland) Val Fitzjohn	84-83-89-82=338	0

Amateurs: Macdonald (355), Johnstone (356), Holabird (361), Stuart (362), Egan (379).

== Winner's scorecards ==
Hole	1	2	3	4	5	6	7	8	9	Out	10	11	12	13	14	15	16	17	18	In	Total
Round 1	5	4	4	4	5	5	5	4	4	40	4	4	4	6	5	4	4	4	4	39	79
Round 2	4	5	4	5	4	5	4	4	3	38	3	4	5	5	5	4	4	4	6	40	78
Round 3	5	3	5	5	4	6	4	4	3	39	3	3	5	6	4	4	4	4	4	37	76
Round 4	5	5	5	5	5	5	3	3	4	40	3	4	5	5	4	5	4	5	5	40	80
