= Meadow Brook Golf Club =

Private golf club in Jericho, Long Island, New York

Meadow Brook Club
- Location within New York
- 40.795184°N 73.556582°W

Club information
- Location: Jericho, New York, United States
- Established: 1894; 132 years ago
- Type: Private
- Tota holes: 18
- Website: www.meadowbrookclub.com
- Designed by: Dick Wilson
- Par: 72
- Length: 7,405 yards (6,771 m)
- Course rating: 75.3
- Slope rating: 143

The Meadow Brook Club is a private golf club in Jericho, New York, Long Island, New York, United States. From 1894 to 1954 it was part of a hunting club, which soon evolved into a major polo club. After the original grounds were expropriated for urban development, it moved to its present location and became primarily a golf club. The Meadowbrook Polo Club is now a separate entity.

== Origins ==
The club originated as the Meadow Brook Hunt Club, established in 1881 in Westbury, New York and home of the Meadow Brook Hounds. The hunt club had its headquarters in Westbury, but convened in different rural parts of Nassau County where the hounds and horses could run free. Future President Theodore Roosevelt was a member of the hunt club, which met at his home in Oyster Bay in 1886. The members sometimes hunted foxes, but often drag hunted, where the hounds followed a trail of anise scent.

The Hunt Club gave birth to the Meadowbrook Polo Club, whose founders included the polo player and millionaire Thomas Hitchcock, Sr. (1862-1941). Hitchcock was one of the founders of the Meadow Brook steeplechase races in 1883, and in 1889 became master of the Meadow Brook Hunt. The club in Westbury had eight polo fields, and was the leading polo center in the United States. During the first half of the 20th century the polo club was often the site for national or international polo championships.

== First course ==
A nine-hole golf course was built for the Meadow Brook Club in 1894. It was located in Hempstead, New York. In 1895 the first national women's golf tournament was held at Meadow Brook. The winner was Lucy Barnes, wife of Charles S. Brown, with 132 strokes for the eighteen-hole match. The club became an early member of the United States Golf Association. On 31 March 1897 the Metropolitan Golf Association was formed at Delmonico's in New York City, at first called the Metropolitan League of Golf Clubs. Oliver W. Bird of Meadow Brook Golf Club was a member of the five-person formation committee.

In 1936 Sam Snead won two matches at the Meadow Brook Club, earning a $10,000 fee. This gave him the money he needed to start playing professionally full time.

== Present course ==
The original polo ground and golf course was requisitioned by New York City Park Commissioner Robert Moses for a parkway extension. The Meadowbrook State Parkway extension of 1954 cut through the club property from north to south. The polo club moved to Post Road in Old Westbury, New York, in 1954. A new entity was formed, now called the Meadowbrook Polo Club, which continued to arrange polo matches on Long Island. In the 1990s it hosted two U.S. Open Championships at Bethpage State Park.

A new site for a golf course in Jericho, New York was selected in October 1953 by Dick Wilson, the architect of the course. Wilson drew up plans for the course in just six weeks. Construction began in April 1954 by Troup Brothers of Miami, who undertook the heavy-duty earth movement. Irrigation and drainage pipes and tile beds were installed in the summer, and grass sown in the fall. Seaside bent was used for the greens and a mix of Astoria bent and Chewings fescue for the fairways. With the move to Jericho the Meadow Brook Club changed into a golf club. The course was officially opened for play on 4 June 1955.

The course has championship tees up to 7,405 yards (6,771 m) in length. It has been host to regional tournaments such as the Metropolitan PGA Championships, the Metropolitan Open and the Lightpath Long Island Classic. Recently Tripp Davis renovated the course, placing more emphasis on interest than on challenge.
