= Bedford Springs, Pennsylvania =

Unincorporated community in Pennsylvania, US

- Unincorporated community
- Location within Pennsylvania
- Coordinates: 39°59′50″N 78°30′35″W
- Country: United States
- State: Pennsylvania
- County: Bedford
- Township: Bedford
- Elevation: 1,175 ft (358 m)
- Time zone: UTC-5 (Eastern (EST))
  - Summer (DST): UTC-4 (EDT)
- Area code: 814
- GNIS feature ID: 1169085

Bedford Springs is an unincorporated community in Bedford County, Pennsylvania, United States. Bedford Springs is located in Bedford Township, just south of the borough of Bedford, in the valley of Shobers Run. U.S. Route 220 Business passes along the northwestern edge of the community.

The community corresponds to the Bedford Springs Hotel Historic District and the hotel is now known as the Omni Bedford Springs Resort.

== Notable people ==
- John Montgomery Smith, Wisconsin lawyer and legislator, was born in Bedford Springs.
