= Laurie Auchterlonie =

Scottish professional golfer (1867–1948)

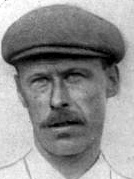

Personal information
- Full name: Lawrence Auchterlonie
- Nickname: Laurie
- Born: 8 December 1867 St Andrews, Scotland
- Died: 20 January 1948 (aged 80) St Andrews, Scotland

Career
- Sport: Golf
- Turned professional: 1899
- Professional wins: 2

Best results in major championships (wins: 1)
- Masters Tournament: DNP
- PGA Championship: DNP
- U.S. Open: Won: 1902
- The Open Championship: T13: 1895

Lawrence Auchterlonie (8 December 1867 – 20 January 1948) was a Scottish professional golfer, a native of St Andrews. In 1902, representing the Glen View Club, he won the eighth U.S. Open at Garden City Golf Club in Garden City, New York.

== Early life ==
Born in St Andrews, Scotland, Auchterlonie was the older brother of Willie Auchterlonie, who won The Open Championship in 1893. Willie had a son named Laurie, who succeeded his father as honorary professional to the Royal and Ancient Golf Club of St Andrews. This Laurie Auchterlonie should not be confused with his uncle, the U.S. Open winner.

== Amateur career ==
Auchterlonie was over 30 before he became a professional. As an amateur he played in the Open Championship when it was played at St Andrews, in 1888, 1891 and 1895. He entered the Amateur Championship for the first time in 1895, when it was held at St Andrews. He reached the semi-finals, losing at the 19th hole to Leslie Balfour-Melville. He entered again in 1897 at Muirfield and 1898 at Royal Liverpool Golf Club. He won the Dundee Evening Telegraph Cup, the unofficial Scottish Amateur Championship, in 1897 at Leven, Fife, beating David Leitch by 2 holes in the final.

== Professional career ==
Auchterlonie's win at the U.S. Open in October 1902 marked the first time that 80 was broken in all four rounds, as he posted a score of 78-78-74-77=307. (The U.S. Open became a 72-hole event four years earlier, in 1898.) He played with the recently invented Haskell rubber-cored golf ball, which was at least partly responsible for the lower scoring. The new ball had first been used to win an important tournament the previous year, when it was used by Walter Travis at the U.S. Amateur and Sandy Herd at The Open Championship in June. It soon became the standard golf ball.

Auchterlonie competed in the U.S. Open eleven times, with seven top-ten finishes. His other victories included the 1901 Western Open. From 1901 to 1911, he was the head golf professional at Glen View Club in Golf, Illinois, a northwest suburb of Chicago; he returned to his native Scotland in 1911.

== Death and legacy ==
Aucterlonie died in 1948 at age 80 in St Andrews, Scotland. He is best remembered for winning the 1902 U.S. Open.

== Major championships ==
=== Wins (1) ===
Year	Championship	54 holes	Winning score	Margin	Runners-up
1902	U.S. Open	5 shot lead	(78-78-74-77=307)	6 strokes	(Scotland) Stewart Gardner, (United States) Walter Travis

=== Results timeline ===
Tournament	1888	1889	1890	1891	1892	1893	1894	1895	1896	1897	1898	1899
U.S. Open	NYF	NYF	NYF	NYF	NYF	NYF	NYF					T9
The Amateur Championship								SF		QF	R16	–
The Open Championship	T15			T18				T13 LA				

Tournament	1900	1901	1902	1903	1904	1905	1906	1907	1908	1909
U.S. Open	4	T5	1	7	T4	24	T3	T11	T21	T23
The Open Championship										

Note: Auchterlonie only played in the Open Championship, the Amateur Championship, and the U.S. Open.

Win
Top 10
Did not play

NYF = Tournament not yet founded
"T" indicates a tie for a place
R256, R128, R64, R32, R16, QF, SF = Round in which player lost in match play
