= Wheatley Hills Golf Club =

Coordinates: 40°45′38.23″N 73°37′39.71″W

Club information
- Location: East Williston & Roslyn Heights, New York, United States
- Established: 1913
- Type: Private
- Total holes: 18
- Par: 72
- Length: 6,887 yards
- Course rating: 73.3

The Wheatley Hills Golf Club is a 110-acre (45 ha) country club and golf course located within East Williston and Roslyn Heights, in Nassau County, New York, United States.

== Description ==
It was established in 1913 from land purchased from William Titus for 48 dollars per acre. The Titus homestead was converted into the clubhouse. Adjacent to the property is the Long Island Motor Parkway built by William Kissam Vanderbilt II where he held auto races and awarded the Vanderbilt Cup. Also adjacent is the property of Harry Payne Whitney.

== See also ==
- Deepdale Golf Club
- North Hills Country Club
