= Garden City Golf Club =

Golf course in Garden City, New York

Coordinates: 40.726554°N 73.642416°W

- Interactive map of Garden City Golf Club

Club information
- Location: Garden City, New York, U.S.
- Established: 1899
- Type: Private
- Total holes: 18
- Tournaments: U.S. Open (1902); U.S. Amateur (1900, 1908, 1913, 1936); Walker Cup (1924)
- Designed by: Devereux Emmet; Walter Travis
- Par: 73
- Length: 6,926 yards
- Course rating: 74
- Slope rating: 141

The Garden City Golf Club is a private golf course in Garden City, New York, on Long Island. Founded in 1899, the club is also known as the "Garden City Men's Club" or simply the "Men's Club" to distinguish it from the Garden City Country Club and the Cherry Valley Club – both of which are also located within the village. It remains one of the few men-only golf clubs in the United States.

== History ==
The course first opened on May 29, 1897 as the Island Golf Links, a nine-hole layout for guests of the Garden City Hotel. Designed by Devereux Emmet, it was soon expanded to eighteen holes with a total length of over 6,000 yards (5,500 m), making it the longest course in the United States. The expanded course was incorporated as the Garden City Golf Club on May 17, 1899. Its club house was designed by Richard Howland Hunt.

Garden City Golf Club hosted the U.S. Open in 1902, which was won by Laurie Auchterlonie. It marked the first time that a player had shot lower than 80 in all four rounds. Amateur Walter Travis, a founding member of the Garden City Golf Club, finished second in the tournament. A few years later, Travis redesigned the layout of his home course, adding numerous bunkers and modifying the greens. During the U.S. Amateur at the Garden City Golf Club, Travis hit a ball into a new pot bunker near the eighteenth green, which led to his defeat in a semifinal match against Jerry Travers. In addition to hosting the U.S. Amateur in 1908, Garden City Golf Club also hosted the tournament in 1900, 1913, and 1936. Garden City was also the host of the Walker Cup in 1924.

After the death of Walter Travis, the Garden City Golf Club renamed its Spring Invitational to the Walter J. Travis Invitational in 1927. Held annually since 1902, it has now become one of the premier mid-amateur golf tournaments in the New York metropolitan area.

In 2013, the Garden City Golf Club was ranked 26th overall in Golf Magazine's list of the Top 100 Courses in the U.S., 47th in Golf Magazine's list of the Top 100 Courses in the World, 55th in Golf Digest's list of America's 100 Greatest Golf Courses, and 9th among Golf Digest's golf courses in New York City.

== Course Layout ==
Garden City Golf Club
Tee	Rating/Slope	1	2	3	4	5	6	7	8	9	Out	10	11	12	13	14	15	16	17	18	In	Total
Championship	74.0/141	293	130	395	576	358	437	534	445	319	3487	411	424	202	537	351	436	404	488	186	3439	6926
Regular	71.0/140	278	125	375	511	348	422	528	403	300	3288	394	410	190	514	346	395	389	470	167	3275	6563
Par	Par	4	3	4	5	4	4	5	4	4	37	4	4	3	5	4	4	4	5	3	36	73
SI	Handicap	15	17	9	7	11	1	3	5	13		6	8	16	4	14	2	10	12	18
