= Val Fitzjohn =

Scottish professional golfer (1878–1934)

Personal information
- Full name: Valentine F. Fitzjohn
- Nationality: Scotland
- Born: 2 June 1878 Edinburgh, Scotland
- Died: 1934 (aged 55–56) Greenwich, Connecticut

Career
- Sport: Golf
- Status: Professional

Best results in major championships
- U.S. Open: T2: 1899

Valentine F. Fitzjohn (2 June 1878 – 1934) was a Scottish professional golfer. He finished tied for second in the 1899 U.S. Open and finished tenth in 1900.

== Early life ==
Fitzjohn was born on 2 June 1878 in Edinburgh, Scotland. He was the son of George Fitzjohn, a former sergeant in the Edinburgh City Police, and his wife Grace Willonghby. Valentine attended Gullane school and at the age of 12 years was a licensed caddie at North Berwick. By 1880 the family had moved to Musselburgh where their father took up a post as clubmaster and steward to the Honourable Company of Edinburgh Golfers. Fitzjohn had three brothers, Herbert, Frederick and Edward "Ned", who were also professional golfers. In 1894 he and Ed emigrated to the United States and by 1896 had been appointed as the first golf professional at Otsego Golf Club at Springfield Center, New York, and remained there until 1899. By October 1900, Fitzjohn was the superintendent of the Van Cortlandt Park links in Brooklyn.

== Golf career ==
On 29 September 1897 he played an exhibition match against John Shippen at Ardsley Golf Club and won easily. An article at the time published in The New York Times described Shippen as "the colored lad".

In October 1900 Fitzjohn and John Reid, Jr. took on Harry Vardon in a match at Albany, New York. During most of his 1900 exhibition tour, Vardon played alone against the best ball of what were usually the two best players at each club where he played matches. A cold rain pelted the players and spectators during the event which Vardon won by the score of 2 up. Fitzjohn's driving off the tee was described as unusually low, with a long run on it, and those shots captured the gallery, although his short game "was not quite up to the mark ...".

By 1901 Fitzjohn was the professional at the Mohawk Golf Club in Schenectady, New York, having prior been engaged at the Otsego Golf Club. In July 1904 he was the professional at the Hillendale Golf Club in Phoenix, Maryland, and posted a course record of 71 on a course in Stamford, Connecticut, and won his match against Dr. Frederick Schavoir. In 1930, Fitzjohn was living in Greenwich, Connecticut.

=== 1899 U.S. Open ===
The 1899 U.S. Open was the fifth U.S. Open. The golf tournament was held 14–15 September 1899, at Baltimore Country Club. Scottish golfer Willie Smith of the Midlothian Country Club, Chicago, recorded a record 11-stroke victory for his first U.S. Open title. Fitzjohn, George Low, and Bert Way finished tied for second. Each player was awarded $125 in prize money. Fitzjohn had rounds of 85-80-79-82=326.

=== 1900 U.S. Open ===
Fitzjohn placed tenth in the 1900 U.S. Open, held 4–5 October 1900, at Chicago Golf Club in Wheaton, Illinois. He carded rounds of 84-83-89-82=338 but failed to win any prize money, nor did the ninth-place finisher, Stewart Gardner.

=== 1901 U.S. Open ===
Fitzjohn also competed in the 1901 U.S. Open held at the Myopia Hunt Club near Boston. He had a T12 finish in the tournament. The Myopia golf course, designed by Herbert Leeds, was difficult to score on. No player entered in the tournament managed to break 80 in any round.

== Death and legacy ==
Fitzjohn died in 1934 in Greenwich, Connecticut. He is best remembered for having two top-10 finishes in the U.S. Open, including a fine T2 finish in the 1899 U.S. Open.

== Results in major championships ==
Tournament	1899	1900	1901
U.S. Open	T2	10	T12

Note: Fitzjohn played only in the U.S. Open.

"T" indicates a tie for a place
Yellow background for top-10
