= Bert Way =

English golfer and golf course designer

- Bert Way, c. 1950

Personal information
- Full name: William Herbert Way
- Nickname: Bertie
- Nationality: England; United States
- Born: 23 August 1873 Bideford, Devon, England
- Died: 11 August 1963 (aged 89) Miami, Florida, U.S.
- Spouse: Caroline Amelia Symons
- Children: 2

Career
- Sport: Golf
- Status: Professional

Best results in major championships
- Masters Tournament: DNP
- PGA Championship: DNP
- U.S. Open: T2: 1899
- The Open Championship: DNP

Achievements and awards
- Greater Cleveland Sports Hall of Fame: 1978

William Herbert "Bert" Way (23 August 1873 – 11 August 1963) was an English professional golfer and golf course designer. Way tied for second place in the 1899 U.S. Open, held 14–15 September 1899, at Baltimore Country Club in Baltimore, Maryland.

Way designed a number of golf courses, the best known being the South Course at Firestone Country Club in Akron, Ohio.

== Early life ==
Way was born in Bideford, Devon, England, to Richard Way (1839–1923) and Frances Mary Way née Henderson (1844–1926). He had four brothers and two sisters. Way was Willie Dunn, Jr.'s apprentice at North Devon and when Dunn left Shinnecock Hills Golf Club, Dunn recommended Way as his replacement. Way and his wife Caroline emigrated to the United States in 1896 and both became naturalized American citizens.

== Golf career ==
=== 1899 U.S. Open ===
In the 1899 U.S. Open, held 14–15 September 1899 at Baltimore Country Club, Way played excellent golf, carding rounds of 80-85-80-81=326. He finished in a tie for second place with George Low and Val Fitzjohn and took home $125 as his share of the purse.

=== Euclid Golf Club ===
Way designed the Euclid Golf Club in Cleveland Heights, Ohio, in 1901, and would go on to design many more in his career. The Euclid Golf Allotment, also known as the Euclid Golf Historic District, is a historic district. Roughly bounded by Cedar Road, Coventry Road, West Street, James Parkway, and Ardleigh Drive, the 142-acre (0.57 km2) site contains primarily residential homes built between 1913 and 1929. The historic district is built on land formerly owned by John D. Rockefeller and at one time leased to the Euclid Golf Club for its back nine holes.

=== Golf courses designed by Way ===
Note: This list may be incomplete.

- Euclid Golf Club – Cleveland Heights, Ohio
- Aurora Golf Club – Public in Aurora, Ohio
- The Black Brook Golf Course & Practice Center – Public in Mentor, Ohio
- Chardon Lakes Golf Course – Public in Chardon, Ohio
- J. E. Good Park Golf Course – Public in Akron, Ohio
- The Mayfield Country Club – Private in Cleveland, Ohio
- South Course at Firestone Country Club – Private in Akron, Ohio
- Port Huron Golf Club – Private in Port Huron, Michigan
- Detroit Golf Club – Private in Detroit, Michigan
- The Country Club of Detroit – Private in Detroit, Michigan
- Cleveland Heights Golf Corse in Lakeland, Florida – The Ledger

== Death and legacy ==
Way died on 11 August 1963 in Miami, Florida. In 1978, he was inducted into the Greater Cleveland Sports Hall of Fame.
