= Mungo Park =

Mungo Park may refer to:

- Mungo Park (explorer) (1771–1806), Scottish explorer
- Mungo Park (golfer) (1836–1904), Scottish golfer
- Mungo Park Jr. (1877–1960), pioneer in South American golf
- Mungo Park (theatre), a theater in Denmark
- Mungo Park Medal, an award
- Mungo National Park, an Australian park
- "Mungo Park", a 2016 Nigerian song by Korede Bello
- Mungo Park, a Monument in Kwara State Nigeria

== See also ==
- John Mungo-Park (1918–1941), British Second World War fighter pilot
