= Euclid Golf Allotment =

- U.S. National Register of Historic Places
- U.S. Historic district
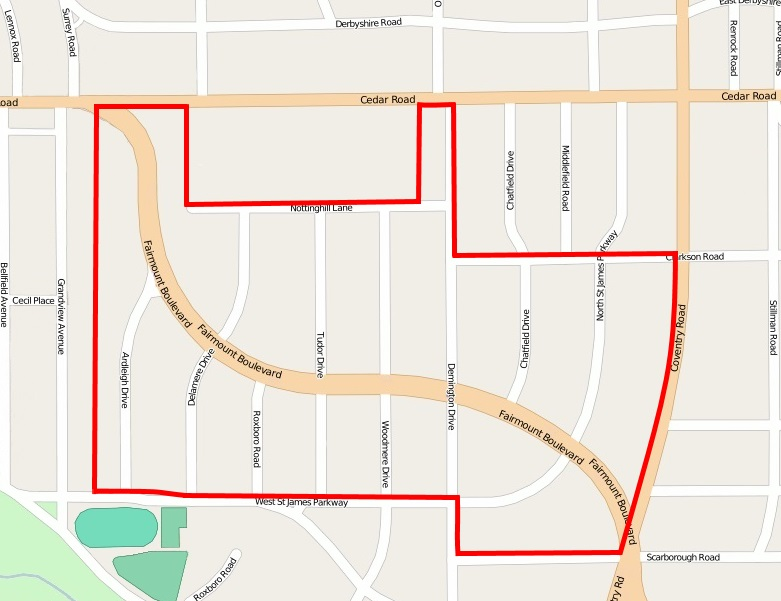
- Boundaries (in red) of the Euclid Golf Allotment
- Location: Cleveland Heights, Ohio
- Coordinates: 41.4969712°N 81.586°W
- Area: 142 acres (0.57 km^{2})
- Built: 1913 to 1929
- NRHP reference No.: 02000887
- Added to NRHP: August 23, 2002

The Euclid Golf Allotment, also known as the Euclid Golf Historic District, is a historic district located in Cleveland Heights, Ohio, in the United States. Roughly bounded by Cedar Road, Coventry Road, West St. James Parkway, and Ardleigh Drive, the 142-acre (0.57 km^{2}) site contains primarily residential homes built between 1913 and 1929. The historic district is built on land formerly owned by John D. Rockefeller and at one time leased to the Euclid Golf Club for its back nine holes, and it takes its name from this historic factoid. The Euclid Golf Allotment is a largely undisturbed example of an early 20th century planned community containing American Craftsman, Colonial Revival, French Renaissance Revival, Italian Renaissance Revival, Prairie School, Shingle Style, and Tudor Revival architecture.

The Euclid Golf Allotment was added to the National Register of Historic Places in 2002. The Euclid Golf Allotment includes the western half of the Fairmount Boulevard District, another national historic district established in 1976.

== Pre-development ==
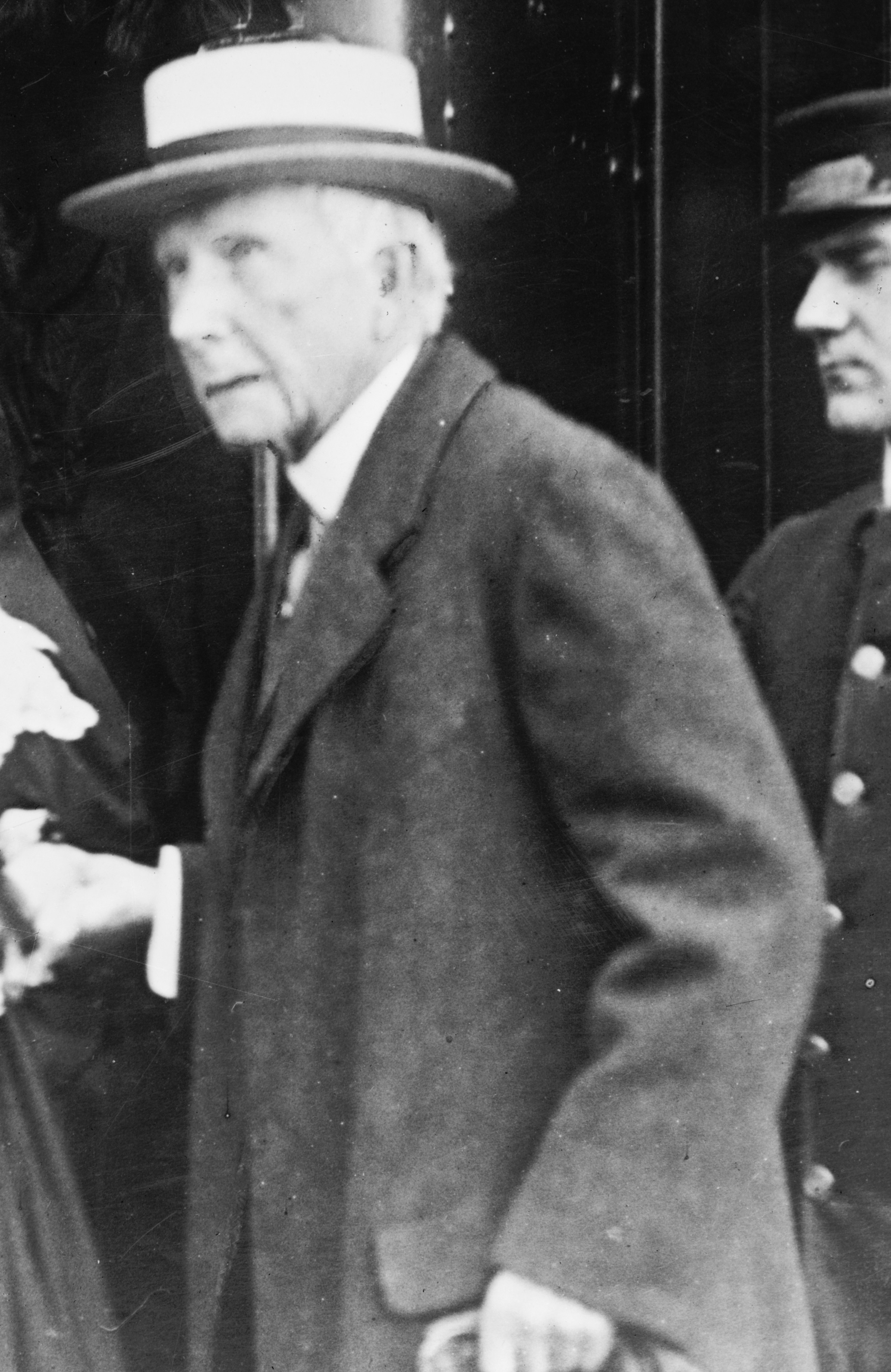
John D. Rockefeller in 1911.

=== Founding Forest Hill ===
The modern city of Cleveland Heights is built atop a geological structure known as the Portage Escarpment, a geological feature some 2 to 4 miles (3.2 to 6.4 km) wide that connects the Appalachian Plateau in the east to the Erie Plain in the west. Early residents of Cleveland settled along The Flats, a low-lying plain on either side of the Cuyahoga River bounded by steep slopes. Although farms initially occupied the Erie Plain above The Flats on both sides of the river, by the American Civil War middle- and upper class homes dominated these areas. Through the middle and late 1800s, a thriving business district grew on the east side of the Cuyahoga around Public Square (conceived in 1796 as the center of the town) and later Clinton Square (built in 1835). The city continued rapidly expanding eastward through the 1800s. As Cleveland became an industrial powerhouse in the late 1800s, it developed an extremely wealthy upper class. Euclid Avenue became the preferred address for more than 300 of the wealthiest families in the United States.

Euclid Avenue reached its zenith in the 1890s, but began a three-decade rapid decline thereafter as extensive retail development drove the upper class eastward. The early pressures placed on Euclid Avenue-dwellers led to the creation of the Forest Hill estate. In 1873, wealthy Clevelander John D. Rockefeller purchased 79 acres (0.32 km^{2}) 4 miles (6.4 km) east of his home at 424 Euclid Avenue. In June 1874, Rockefeller sold 10 acres (0.040 km^{2}) of this land to investors who wished to build a sanatorium on the site. A hotel was built atop the highest hill on this land, and Rockefeller and fellow Standard Oil investor Stephen V. Harkness founded a commuter rail line, the Lake View and Collamer Railroad, to serve the sanatorium. But the hospital never opened, and the sanatorium venture failed. Rockefeller purchased the land back in 1877 transformed the hotel into his summer home, and named the estate Forest Hill. Much of the estate, however, was managed as timber farm.

=== Founding of Euclid Heights and the Euclid Club ===
The development of electric streetcars made the development of suburbs far outside Cleveland's city limits practical for the first time in the 1890s. In 1890, railroad baron Patrick Calhoun purchased 300 acres (1.2 km^{2}) atop nearby Cedar Hill, and in 1893 established the planned community of Euclid Heights. (Note: The development was named for Euclid Avenue and the high position the property sat on.) It was common at the time for deed restrictions governing type of construction, land use, occupancy, and more to be used when zoning laws and regulations did not exist, and Calhoun's Euclid Heights prohibited retail within the development to prevent Euclid Heights from becoming another Euclid Avenue. (Depreciation in residential home values was quite common at the time, and it was not unrealistic for a family to fear loss of their home due to retail development.)

To further enhance the value of the development, Calhoun organized the Euclid Golf Club. With a course designed by British professional golfer W.H. "Bertie" Way, the club opened in 1901. The clubhouse was located on Norfolk Road, between Derbyshire and Cedar roads. The first, second, and ninth greens were located due west of the clubhouse, in the area framed by Euclid Heights Road and Cedar Road. The fourth through eighth greens ran largely north and south in the area framed by Cedar Road, Harcourt Drive, North Park Boulevard, and Bellfield Avenue. The back nine holes were in the area framed by Cedar Road, Grandview Avenue, North Park Boulevard, and Demington Drive. The club didn't own the land beneath the back nine, however. This was part of Rockefeller's Forest Hill estate. Calhoun asked Rockefeller, an avid golfer, to lease the necessary area to the club. Rockefeller agreed to do so, and required no lease payment—provided no golf was played on Sunday.

=== Encroachment of Cedar Heights and Shaker Heights ===
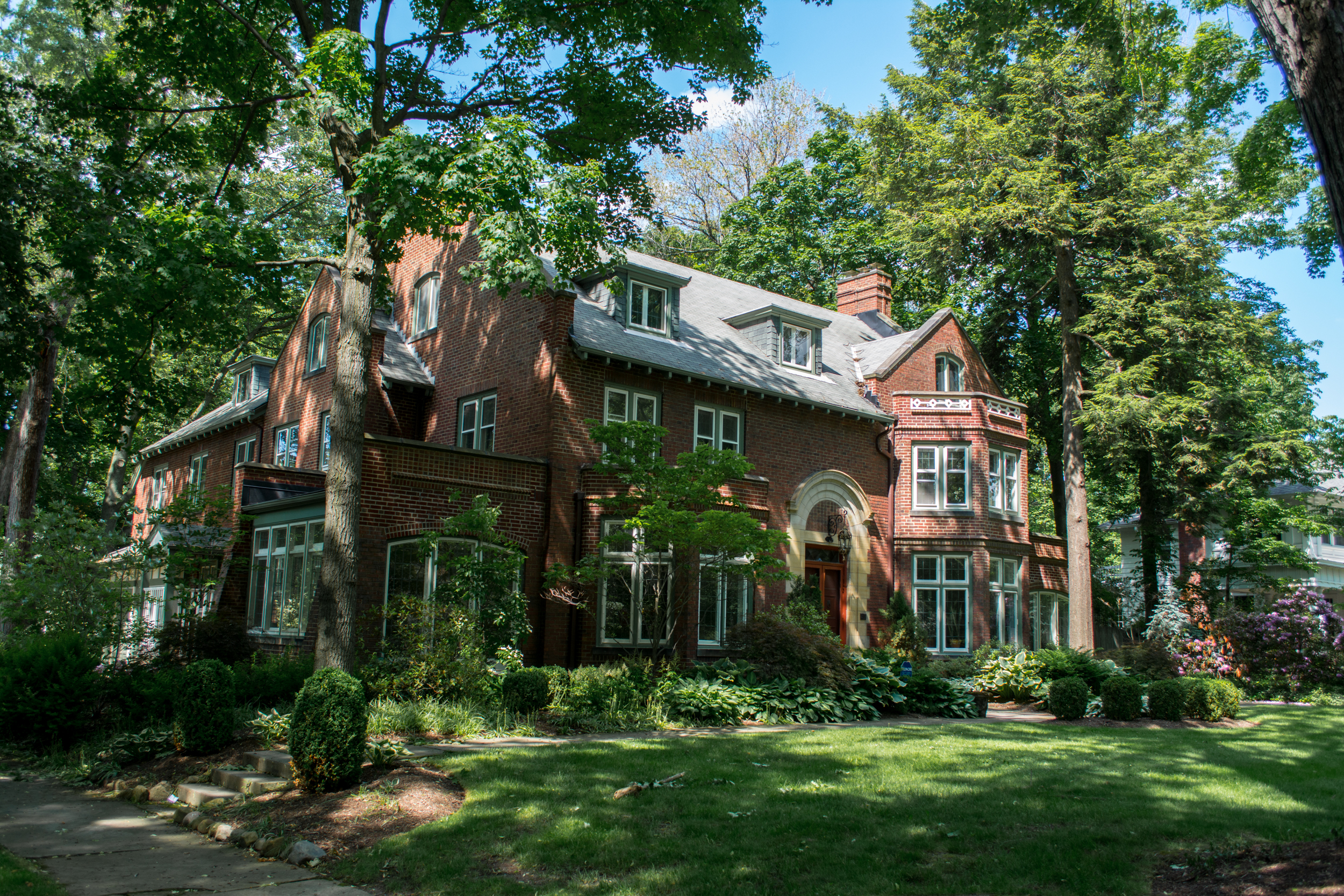
Typical home on Fairmount Blvd. in the Euclid Golf Allotment

The Euclid Club was hindered by another development, Cedar Heights. Concurrent with the development of Euclid Heights, William and Edmund Walton, Jr. purchased a pasture adjacent to the western boundary of Forest Hill. They built two roads, Grandview Avenue and Bellfield Avenue. They began developing the lots on the east side of Grandview Avenue, the west side of Bellfield Avenue, and between Grandview and Bellfield Avenues, and constructed middle-class homes similar to their previous development in Little Italy. Cedar Heights was marketed only sparingly and developed slowly. But the development sat squarely and inconveniently between the front nine and back nine of the Euclid Club.

The creation of the Shaker Heights development largely doomed the golf club. A community of Shakers founded a 1,400-acre (5.7 km^{2}) commune and farm in the area in 1822, but their numbers had dwindled to just 27 by 1888. In a series of transactions, (Note: The first transaction occurred June 9, 1891, when the Shaker Society sold the land to Laurence Lamb. Lamb sold the land to the Continental Development Land Company of Virginia on April 7, 1892. The Continental Development Land Company then sold the land to Cleveland businessman Joseph A. Oakes on June 17, 1893, for the price of $1 and assumption of the mortgage. Just 24 days later, on July 11, Oakes sold the land for $1 to the Shaker Heights Land Company.) the Shakers sold the land to a group of Cleveland investors in 1891 who called themselves the Shaker Heights Land Company. (Note: Primary investors in the Shaker Heights Land Company included Luther Allen, Stewart Chisholm, Bird W. Housum, Laurence Lamb, and T. Avery Lamb.) The company then donated 279 acres (1.13 km^{2}) of land along Doan Brook, Horseshoe Lake (aka Upper Shaker Lake), and Lower Shaker Lake in December 1895 to the city of Cleveland as a park, with the proviso that the city build a road along the park (which effectively connected the Shaker Heights development to Cleveland). Rockefeller donated another 276 acres (1.12 km^{2}) as well, to connect this park to Lake Erie (creating Rockefeller Park). Sales remained meager, however, and the company sold its land holdings in 1896 to a syndicate of Buffalo investors led by William Henry Gratwick, Sr. (owner of the Gratwick Steamship Company) and John J. Albright (president of the Ontario Power Company). Once more, sales were minimal. Eight years later, the land was overgrown and its value was 25 percent below its $316,000 ($12,229,200 in 2025 dollars) purchase price. In 1904, the Van Sweringen brothers, Oris Paxton and Mantis James, took over as land agents for the company, formed a syndicate of local investors, and began purchasing lots for development from the Shaker Heights Land Company. As with Calhoun's Euclid Heights, the Van Sweringens used deed restrictions to significantly constrain development to residential housing, and to require that all housing be of the highest quality in terms of design, siting, and construction.

The development of Shaker Heights adjoined the Rockefeller estate. Rockefeller was intrigued by the possibility of developing Forest Hill, (Note: In 1884, Rockefeller purchased a mansion at 4 W. 54th Street in New York City and moved his family there.) and allowed the Van Sweringens to produce a brochure showing how a possible development of the eastern half of his "back nine" could be developed into yet another planned community. But nothing came of this venture. In 1906, Rockefeller agreed to allow the Van Sweringens to build a streetcar line across the Forest Hills estate. The line followed Cedar Road, and then traveled in the center of Fairmount Boulevard to Lee Road. Although a part of Fairmount Boulevard had existed since 1858, the portion from Cedar Road southeast to Lee Road was only developed at this time—cutting right across the Euclid Club's back nine.

=== Closure of the Euclid Club ===
A significant number of Euclid Club members quit in 1909 and founded the Mayfield Country Club about 2 miles (3.2 km) to the east in Lyndhurst, Ohio. The Euclid Club discontinued its operations in 1912, (Note: Historian Marian J. Morton gives two different dates for the club's closure, in 1912 and 1913.) The rest of the members left in 1913 to form the Shaker Heights Country Club, which opened in 1915. The Euclid Club briefly reopened the links in 1915, but ceased operations again the same year.

== Building the Euclid Golf Allotment ==
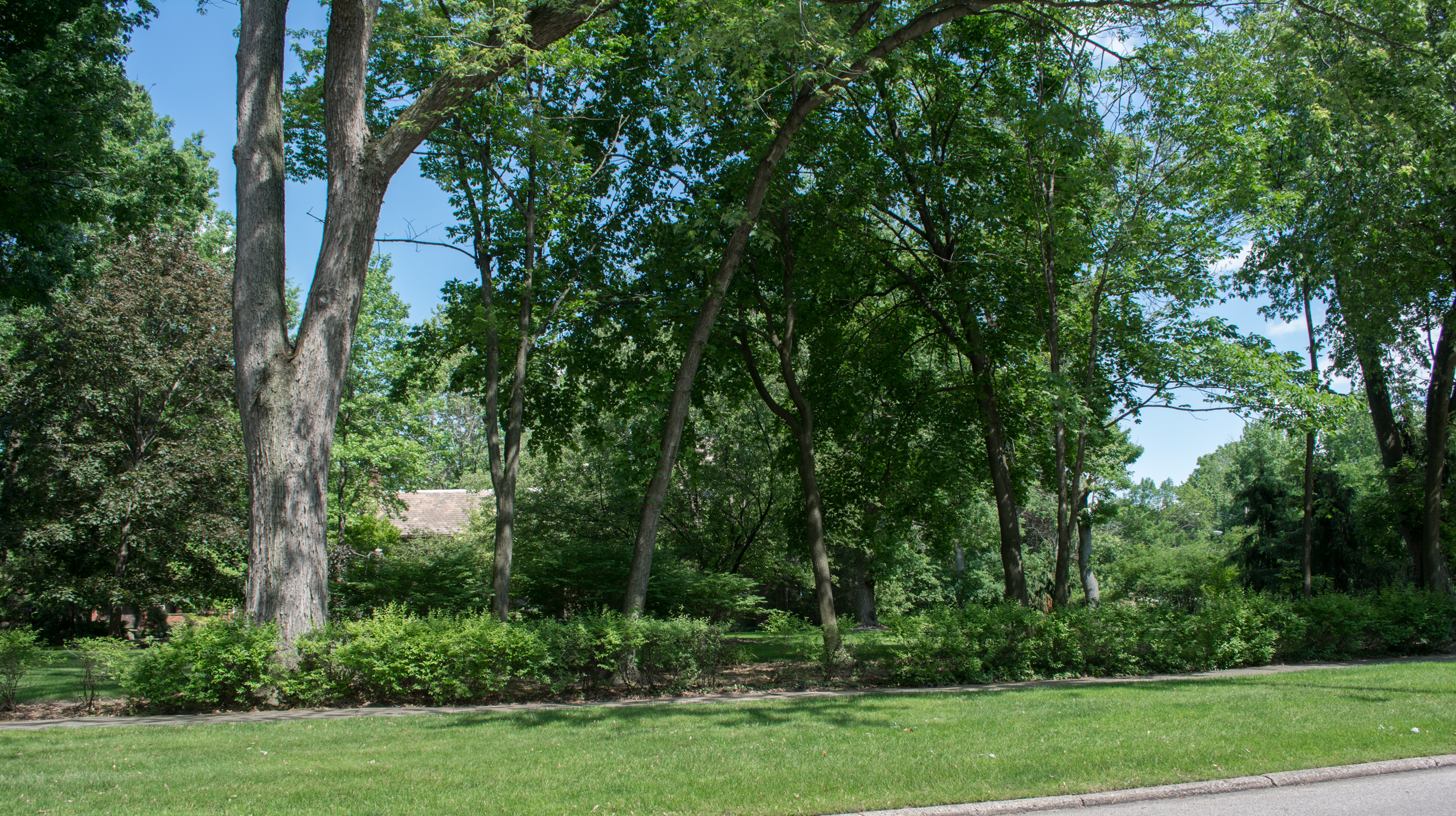
Empty lot on the northeast corner of Demington Drive and Fairmount Blvd. on which Barton Deming had his sales office.

In 1913, Barton R. Deming convinced John D. Rockefeller to enter into a purchase agreement for the 141 acres (0.57 km^{2}) formerly leased to the Euclid Club. The Canadian-born Deming and several of his brothers had moved to Cleveland in 1893. After working for other companies for several years, he and his brothers formed Deming Brothers, a real estate development company, in 1903 and developed several high-quality neighborhoods in East Cleveland. Deming's brother, Grant, owned several other real estate development firms, which had done business with Rockefeller in developing other parts of the Forest Hill estate. Through this work, Barton Deming came to know John D. Rockefeller.

Deming founded the B.R. Deming Company to develop the Euclid Golf Allotment. Under the agreement struck by Deming and Rockefeller, Deming could plat or make improvements to the property only with the approval of Abeyton Realty Company, a firm founded by Rockefeller in 1909 to oversee his real estate ventures. The Euclid Golf lots were to be smaller than those in Euclid Heights, for Clarence C. Terrill, manager of Abeyton Realty, felt that the overly large lot size had inhibited Calhoun's sales. While Rockefeller bankrolled the improvements, Deming had control over sales.

Initially, the Euclid Golf development ran into financial trouble. Lot prices fell due to competition from neighboring developments. The situation worsened when Euclid Heights developer Patrick Calhoun declared bankruptcy in 1916, and his vast Euclid Heights holdings were sold at a sheriff's sale at rock-bottom prices. Deming was forced to renegotiate his agreement with Rockefeller in 1915. In order to retain his position as the sole sales agent for Euclid Golf until July 31, 1916, Deming was forced to invest $89,747 ($2,856,257 in 2025 dollars) of his own money into the development. In return, Abeyton Realty invested $320,000 ($10,184,211 in 2025 dollars) in laying drinking water, electrical power, natural gas, and sewer lines and building new paved roads, complete with gutters and curbs. The new agreement also required Deming to sell lots at a minimum price and no less. Once Deming made his initial investment payment, he was permitted to purchase the rest of the property for $430,000 ($13,685,033 in 2025 dollars).

Sales were strong thereafter, and on October 3, 1919, Deming paid $463,158.40 ($14,740,321 in 2025 dollars) for the remainder of the Euclid Golf Allotment.

=== Layout and architectural principles ===
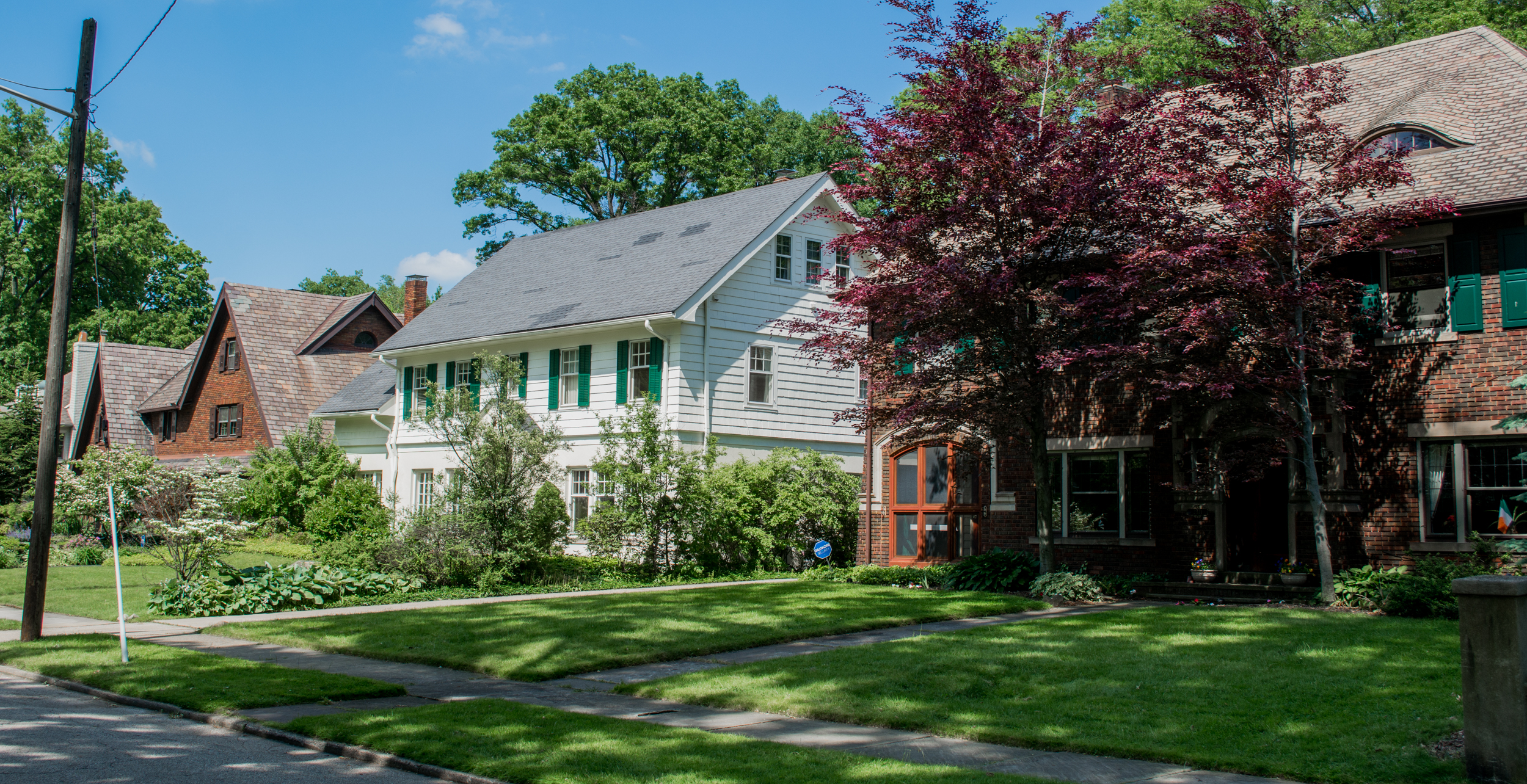
Typical homes on Woodmere Drive in the Euclid Golf Allotment.

Deming platted the Euclid Golf Allotment according to the principles of the "garden city movement", then a popular design strategy for wealthy suburbs. He retained as much of the natural beauty of the area as possible, and imitated other developers freely when their practices proved successful. For example, despite its past use as a golf course, the Euclid Golf Allotment was heavily wooded with mature deciduous trees. Deming required that builders retain as many of these as possible during home construction, so that the value of the land would be as high as possible. (Many of these trees still exist in the 2000s.) Deming also decided to dig Fairmount Boulevard on either side of the Cleveland Railway line which already existed on the property. A 50-foot (15 m) wide roadway was created on both sides of the railway line, and Deming's engineers mimicked the design of Fairmount Boulevard in Shaker Heights (laid out by the F. A. Pease Engineering Company).

To meet the requirements of the amended agreement with Rockefeller, Deming first had to lay out streets (which would then allow him to plat the development). These streets all gently curved, both because this met the design principles of the "garden city" movement but also because it allowed streets to conform to the sloping, ravine-ridden geography of the site. All the streets also connected easily and naturally to those of surrounding developments.

Seven deed restrictions significantly limited the type and design of structures which could be erected in the Euclid Golf Allotment. Six restrictions were initially placed on construction. The first limited structures to private residential homes, specified a minimum expenditure for construction, established setback rules, and required the approval of the B.R. Deming Company before construction could begin. (Note: These restrictions sometimes effectively limited construction to a single building in some areas. Permanent easements on both sides of each lot also effectively pushed utility lines to the back of the house, leaving front yards and road verges along the streets clear. Deming contracted with Howell & Thomas to provide design approval for all lotholders.) The goal of the restriction was to assist the builder in achieving the highest possible quality, rather than to limit him. The second restriction established minimum expenditure levels and setback rules for garages and outbuildings, and prohibited outhouses. The third limited fence height to 3 feet (0.91 m), and established setback rules for fences. The fourth restriction barred a wide range of uses for structures, including apartments, boarding houses, taverns, and a wide range of public entertainment venues (such as dance halls and movie theaters). The fifth prohibited occupants from manufacturing or selling alcohol on the premises. The sixth deed restriction regulated the placement and size of advertising signs or similar devices. A seventh restriction, added to plots sold later, required that landscaping adhere to standards set by the B.R. Deming Company. All deed restrictions expired on May 1, 1950.

=== Home construction ===
To entice buyers, and to demonstrate how architectural creativity was not stifled by the deed restrictions, Deming hired the architectural firm of Howell & Thomas to design several model homes for the development. Nearly all the model homes were built before 1920, and 12 of the 45 structures built on Fairmount Boulevard were model houses designed by Howell & Thomas. The very first model house was Deming's own home, constructed on a narrow, curving, steep parcel of land at 2645 Fairmount Boulevard. The $6,000 home ($192,857 in 2025 dollars) was designed to act as a gateway to the development, impressing visitors with its high quality and stylishness as they entered the Euclid Golf Allotment. Construction on the Deming house began on started May 4, 1914, and it was largely complete by the end of the year.

St. James Parkway was the first street Deming platted. Eighteen of the 22 homes built in Euclid Golf Allotment in the 1910s were constructed on North St. James. West St. James Parkway was the next to be developed. Deming was frustrated by the existence of Roxboro Elementary School and Roxboro Junior High School on the south side of the western half of West St. James Parkway, and by several low-quality duplexes on the south side of the eastern half of West St. James. To protect the Euclid Golf Allotment, Deming contracted with Howell & Thomas to design 14 cottages for construction on the north side of West St. James to screen these low-quality homes from the rest of the development. These were built in the 1910s, with four more in the 1920s. Ten of the 18 houses were in the Colonial Revival style. Deming even purchased three of the remaining lots on the south side of West St. James and built high-quality cottages (2600, 2594, and 2580-2582 West St. James Parkway) to provide an additional screen for the Euclid Golf Development.

=== Non-residential construction ===
Although nearly all the buildings constructed in the Euclid Golf Allotment were private, single-family homes, two structures were not. The first of these was the Heights Medical Building at 2460 Fairmount Boulevard. By the mid-1920s, Deming had turned his attention to the intersection of Cedar Road and Fairmount Boulevard. He had hoped to build apartment buildings east of the intersection, whose tall forms would come even with the higher part of the escarpment on which Euclid Golf Allotment was built. But a number of two- and three-story businesses had been built there by this time. The Heights Medical Building (now restaurants, retail, and offices) was a compromise structure. Designed by the firm of Steffens & Steffens and finished in 1926, the Heights Medical Building was more architecturally similar to structures in Euclid Golf Allotment, but its usage was more similar to that of the lower-quality business structures in Cedar Heights and Euclid Heights nearby.

The other major non-residential structure in the Euclid Golf Allotment was St. Paul's Episcopal Church. St. Paul's had been the church of choice of the old Euclid Avenue aristocracy, but the decline of the avenue induced the church to move to Euclid Golf Allotment (where many of its parishioners had taken up residence). The church purchased several lots at the intersection of Coventry Road and Fairmount Boulevard (2747 Fairmount Blvd.), and hired architect J. Byers Hayes of the noted Cleveland architectural firm of Walker and Weeks to design the structure. Construction began on the parish hall in 1927, and services were first held there in April 1928. The bell tower was finished in 1929. The Great Depression halted additional construction for a decade. Construction began on the sanctuary in 1941, but shortages of construction materials during World War II forced work to halt for several years. Hayes revised his plans for the sanctuary in 1947 to reduce its cost, and construction began again in 1949. The sanctuary was finished in 1951.

== About the historic district ==
The Euclid Golf Allotment was added to the National Register of Historic Places in 2002.

The historic district contains 141 acres (0.57 km^{2}), all of which are residential except for St. Paul's Episcopal Church (intersection of Coventry Road and Fairmount Blvd.) and Heights Medical Building (intersection of Fairmount Blvd. and Cedar Road). A portion of the Fairmount Boulevard Historic District, added to the National Register of Historic Places in 1976, is contained within the Euclid Golf Allotment Historic District.

The Euclid Golf Allotment Historic District continues to be laid out in accordance with "garden city" principles. The main road running through historic district if Fairmount Boulevard. Parcels on Fairmount Boulevard typically are 90 feet (27 m) wide and 200-to-250-foot (61 to 76 m) deep. Secondary roads running through the historic district include Ardleigh Drive, Chatfield Drive, Delamere Drive, Demington Drive, North St. James Parkway, Roxboro Road, Scarborough Road, Tudor Drive, West St. James Parkway, and Woodmere Drive.

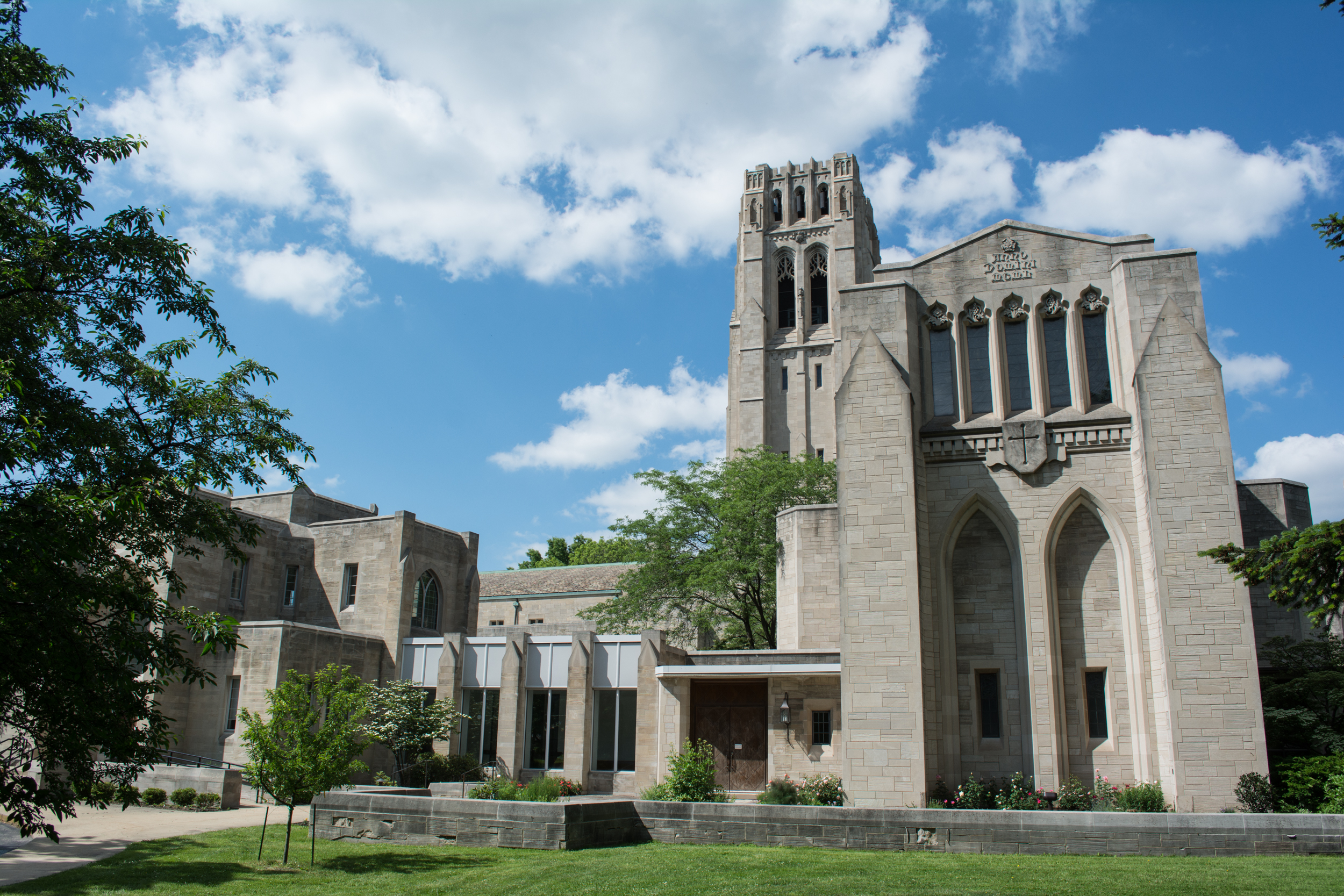
Looking at the new narthex entrance and bell tower of St. Paul's Episcopal Church.

There are 432 structures in the Euclid Golf Allotment Historic District. Fifty-four of these structures are in the Fairmount Boulevard Historic District, and 48 of these 54 are historic. Of the 378 remaining structures, 363 are historic. These include 229 residences, one commercial building, and 133 outbuildings (primarily garages). All of the residences are single-family homes, except for a single duplex and two cottages. Most of the homes in the Euclid Golf Allotment Historic District were designed by leading Cleveland-area architects, including Charles Sumner Schneider, Maxwell Norcross, Mead & Hamilton, Howell & Thomas, and Walker & Weeks.

Although deed restrictions regulated many aspects of construction and siting, they did not restrict the style of architecture in the Euclid Golf Allotment Historic District. Homes were designed in an array of architectural styles, and most homes were designed with elements from several styles. Generally speaking, homes built from 1913 to 1919 are more eclectic and rely on Native American architectural styles, while those built after 1919 tend to draw on more European architectural traditions and tend to be more accurate revival designs. Homes in the Colonial Revival architectural style are the most common in the historic district, representing about half of all structures. Colonial Revival homes built in the 1910s tend to include elements of the Arts & Crafts, Prairie, and Queen Anne architectural styles. Colonial Revival homes built in the 1920s tend to be more purist in style. There are 75 homes in the Tudor Revival architectural style, representing 26.4 percent of all structures in the historic district. Three distinct subgenres of the Tudor Revival style—Early English, Jacobean, and Cottage—are represented in the allotment.

One-hundred-and-thirty-three (47.5 percent) of the homes in the Euclid Golf Allotment Historic District were built between 1913 and 1919. One-hundred-and-thirty-four homes (47.5 percent) were built between 1920 and 1929. Four homes (1.4 percent) were built in the 1930s, and 11 homes (3.9 percent) were constructed after 1950.

Most utility lines run in the rear of the houses. Sidewalks are wider than usual, and original sidewalks (made of slate paving) are common. Wide road verges exist between the sidewalk and roadway. Most of the trees in the historic district existed when the development was constructed in the 1910s and 1920s.

The Euclid Golf Allotment Historic District retained much of its original character as of 2002. The facades of few homes had been significantly altered, although about two-thirds of slate roofs had been replaced with asphalt or composite shingle roofs. Other changes, such as modern windows instead of leaded glass and enclosure of porches, were also made, but these tended to be minimal. Additions to homes tend to be very uncommon, although generally in the same architectural style as the original structure.

== Bibliography ==
- Brechin, Gray (2006). Imperial San Francisco: Urban Power, Earthly Ruin. Berkeley, Calif.: University of California Press. ISBN 9780520933484.
- Bremer, Deanna L.; Fisher, Hugh P. (2004). Euclid Golf Neighborhood. Charleston, S.C.: Arcadia Publishing. ISBN 9780738532547.
- Burgess, Patricia (1994). Planning for the Private Interest: Land Use Controls and Residential Patterns in Columbus, Ohio, 1900-1970. Columbus, Ohio: Ohio State University Press. ISBN 9780814206324.
- Chernow, Ron (2010). Titan: The Life of John D. Rockefeller, Sr. New York: Vintage Books. ISBN 9780307429773.
- Cigliano, Jan (1991). Showplace of America: Cleveland's Euclid Avenue, 1850-1910. Kent, Ohio: Kent State University Press. ISBN 9780873384452.
- Cushing, H.P.; Leverett, Frank; Van Horn, Frank R. (1931). Geology and Mineral Resources of the Cleveland District, Ohio. Washington, D.C.: U.S. Government Printing Office.
- Gibans, Nina Freedlander (2005). Creative Essence: Cleveland's Sense of Place. Kent, Ohio: Kent State University Press. ISBN 9780873388191.
- Goulder, Grace (1973). John D. Rockefeller: The Cleveland Years. Cleveland: Western Reserve Historical Society. ISBN 9780911704099.
- Grabowski, John J. (1992). Sports in Cleveland: An Illustrated History. Bloomington, Ind.: Indiana University Press. ISBN 9780253326201.
- Gregor, Sharon E. (2006). Forest Hill: The Rockefeller Estate. Charleston, S.C.: Arcadia Publishing. ISBN 9780738540948.
- Haberman, Ian S. (1979). The Van Sweringens of Cleveland: The Biography of an Empire. Cleveland: Western Reserve Historical Society. ISBN 9780911704204.
- Harwood, Herbert H. (2003). Invisible Giants: The Empires of Cleveland's Van Sweringen Brothers. Bloomington, Ind.: Indiana University Press. ISBN 9780253110602.
- Hopkins, Kenneth L. (2004). Cleveland Area Golf. Charleston, S.C.: Arcadia Publishing. ISBN 9780738533605.
- Jedick, Peter (1988). "When Euclid Avenue Was Somebody". In Lupold, Harry Forrest; Haddad, Gladys (eds.). Ohio's Western Reserve: A Regional Reader. Kent, Ohio: Kent State University Press. ISBN 9780873383639.
- Johannesen, Eric (1979). Cleveland Architecture, 1876-1976. Cleveland: Western Reserve Historical Society. ISBN 9780911704211.
- Kretzschmar, Sabine (Spring 2007). "Shaker Lakes Park: A Timeline" (PDF). The Journal of the Shaker Historical Society: 1, 5. Archived from the original (PDF) on March 4, 2016.
- Miller, Carol Poh; Wheeler, Robert A. (1997). Cleveland: A Concise History, 1796-1996. Bloomington, Ind.: Indiana University Press. ISBN 9780253211477.
- Moffat, Francis (1977). Dancing on the Brink of the World: The Rise and Fall of San Francisco Society. New York: Putnam. ISBN 9780399117213.
- Morton, Marian J. (2002). Cleveland Heights: The Making of an Urban Suburb. Charleston, S.C.: Arcadia Publishing. ISBN 9780738523842.
- Morton, Marian J. (2005). Cleveland Heights. Charleston, S.C.: Arcadia Publishing. ISBN 9780738533889.
- Morton, Marian J. (2009). Cleveland Heights Congregations. Charleston, S.C.: Arcadia Publishing. ISBN 9780738561424.
- Morton, Marian J. (2010). The Overlook of Cleveland and Cleveland Heights, Ohio. Charleston, S.C.: Arcadia Publishing. ISBN 9780738578224.
- National Park Service (July 3, 2002). Euclid Golf Allotment. National Register of Historic Places Registration Form. NPS Form 10-900. (Rev. 10-90) (Report). Washington, D.C.: United States Department of the Interior. Archived from the original on October 1, 2017.
- Rose, Mark H. (1987). "Highways". In Van Tassel, David D.; Grabowski, John J. (eds.). The Encyclopedia of Cleveland History. Bloomington, Ind.: Indiana University Press. ISBN 9780253313034.
- Rose, William Ganson (1990). Cleveland: The Making of a City. Kent, Ohio: Kent State University Press. ISBN 9780873384285.
- Ruminski, Dan; Dutka, Alan (2012). Cleveland in the Gilded Age: A Stroll Down Millionaires' Row. Charleston, S.C.: The History Press. ISBN 9781609498788.
- Smith, Dennis (2005). San Francisco Is Burning: The Untold Story of the 1906 Earthquake and Fires. New York: Viking. ISBN 9780670034420.
- Smith, Howard Dwight (May 1921). "Euclid Gold, Cleveland, Ohio. Howell & Thomas, Architects". Architectural Forum: 165–172.
- Stilgoe, John R. (1988). Borderland: Origins of the American Suburb, 1820-1939. New Haven, Conn.: Yale University Press. ISBN 9780300042573.
- Toman, Jim; Hays, Blaine S. (1996). Horse Trails to Regional Rails: The Story of Public Transit in Greater Cleveland. Kent, Ohio: Kent State University Press. ISBN 9780873385473.
- Van Tassel, David D.; Grabowski, John J., eds. (1987). "Public Square". The Encyclopedia of Cleveland History. Bloomington, Ind.: Indiana University Press. ISBN 9780253313034.
