= George Low Jr. =

American golfer (1912–1995)

George Low, Jr.
- Low selecting a club, c. 1939

Personal information
- Full name: George Anderson Low, Jr.
- Nickname: Tiny
- Nationality: United States
- Born: July 5, 1912 Springfield, New Jersey
- Died: April 10, 1995 (aged 82) Illinois

Career
- Sport: Golf
- Status: Professional

Best results in major championships
- Masters Tournament: DNP
- PGA Championship: DNP
- U.S. Open: T48: 1936
- The Open Championship: DNP

George Anderson Low, Jr. (July 5, 1912 – April 10, 1995) was an American professional golfer and noted putting instructor and designer of golf putters. Low was also one of golf's greatest—and unabashed—hustlers. He once reportedly said, "Show me a millionaire with a bad backswing and I can have a very pleasant afternoon".

Counsellor of putting to Arnold Palmer and his contemporaries, Low was renowned both as a player and a teacher of the sure putting stroke.

Low died in Illinois on April 10, 1995, at the age of 82.

== Early life ==
George Low was born in Springfield, New Jersey, in 1912. He was the son of Scottish-American golf professional George Low, Sr. He grew up on Baltusrol Golf Club where his father was the head professional and actually lived on the grounds. Low stated that he putted on the practice greens there as a child for four years before he ever stepped on a golf course to play an actual round. He would not actually take up the game until he was 15 years old.

== Golf career ==
Low was active on the PGA Tour in the 1930s through the 1950s. Although a fine player, he was better known as a designer of putters. His Sportsman Wizard 600 model was used most famously by Jack Nicklaus in the prime year of his career. He was a putting instructor for Arnold Palmer, Jack Nicklaus and Lee Trevino, among others. In the late 1940s, Low contracted with the Hansberger brothers, owners of Sportsman's Golf (now Ram Golf), to manufacture the fine-line Wizard putters under both the Sportsman and Bristol brands. The George Low autograph Wizard 600 was produced and is now considered one of the world's most collectible golf clubs, sometimes carrying a $25,000+ price tag.

In 1936, Low was the head professional at Plymouth Country Club in Plymouth Meeting, Pennsylvania, and the following year he served as assistant at the Manufacturers Golf & Country Club in Fort Washington, Pennsylvania. He subsequently assisted his father at a driving range in Jenkintown, Pennsylvania.

Low was also one of the best putters the game has ever known. Low wrote (with Al Barkow) his only book, The Master of Putting, which was published in 1983. In the book, Low reveals the secrets of his amazingly dependable putting technique, addressing stance, grip, tempo, and the other putting fundamentals. Low's physical appearance was described by Los Angeles Times golf writer Jim Murray as "… built along the general lines of a Chicago Bear linebacker, he had the gruff exterior of a Balkan border guard and he tried not to say anything good about anybody—it destroyed his image. But actually he had a left ventricle full of fudge".

"Show me a millionaire with a bad backswing and I can have a very pleasant afternoon".

— Low on hustling high handicappers

The 1957 Masters Tournament champion, Doug Ford, stated that "George Low was the greatest putter I ever saw outside of Tiger Woods. George could putt with his foot better than most guys could with their putter. That's the truth. I saw him beat a guy in Havana, [Florida], for $35,000 putting with his foot". Low's father, George Low, Sr. (1874–1950), was a noted Scottish professional golfer who had four professional wins. The highlight of his father's career was a T2 finish in the 1899 U.S. Open.

Low was one of the great characters of 20th century golf. World Golf Hall of Fame member Dan Jenkins described him in his book, The Dogged Victims of Inexorable Fate, as follows: "He is, all at once, America's guest, underground comedian, consultant, inventor of the overlapping grip for a beer can, and, more importantly, a man who has conquered the two hardest things in life—how to putt better than anyone ever, and how to live lavishly without an income". Low once stated: “I had been a test pilot for Foot Joys forever. I test their $65 alligator models to see if standing in them for long periods of time in a bar brings any serious harm [and] what effect spilling beer has on them”.

Low's idol wasn't a golfer, it was the jockey Willie Shoemaker. Low told golf writer Jim Murray, "putting a two-ounce ball into a four-inch hole is nothin' compared to putting a 1,200-pound horse through a one-foot hole on the fence". Low would achieve his 15 minutes of fame on the golf course rather than at the track. He would often remind other pros that he was the one who broke Byron Nelson's string of 11 consecutive tour victories in 1945. It was complicated—most things with Low were. An amateur, Fred Haas, actually won the 1945 Memphis Invitational Open but as an amateur he couldn't take the prize money. Instead, as low professional in the event, Low waltzed away with the cash (Nelson tied for fourth).

There are many legends and half-truths that have been written, spoken and whispered about George's remarkable putting ability. There are wild tales of George putting with a rake, a shovel, a pool cue or a broom handle and defeating an opponent who was using a legitimate club. There are stories of George kicking a ball with his foot and acing five out of nine holes in one round on the practice green. Other stories hint that George has given putting "secrets" to people like Arnold Palmer, Bing Crosby and Willie Mays that have enabled them at certain moments to display divine touches on the greens. And there are stories that in the old days George took so much money away from the tour champs in friendly putting games after tournaments were over that, as George said, "I shoulda been given a speeding ticket, I win so fast".

Although Low never played in the Masters, he was a friend and sometimes putting mentor of four-time champion Arnold Palmer, who gave Low some credit after finishing birdie-birdie to win his second green jacket in 1960. "The only thing I did on those putts," Palmer said at the time, "was keep thinking what my old friend George Low always says: 'Keep your head down and don't move.' " More infamously, from behind the gallery ropes Low called Palmer over to congratulate him on the 18th fairway during the final round in the 1961 Masters shortly before Palmer made a sloppy double bogey to hand the title to Gary Player, who just happened to be using a George Low signature putter manufactured after Palmer's win in 1960. With that exposure, George was suddenly more than a mystery man and began being sought out by sports writers around the country.

== Death ==
Low died on April 10, 1995, at the age of 82.
