= Peter Walker (golfer) =

Scottish golfer

Personal information
- Full name: Peter Walker
- Nationality: Scotland
- Born: c. 1876 Scotland

Career
- Sport: Golf
- Status: Professional

Best results in major championships
- Masters Tournament: DNP
- PGA Championship: DNP
- U.S. Open: T9: 1899
- The Open Championship: WD: 1900

Peter Walker (born c. 1876) was a Scottish golfer. Walker placed tied for ninth in the 1899 U.S. Open, held 14–15 September 1899, at Baltimore Country Club in Baltimore, Maryland.

== Early life ==
Walker was born in Scotland, circa 1876.

== Golf career ==
=== 1897 Amateur Championship ===
While a student at St Andrews University, Walker played in the 1897 Amateur Championship. He beat the experienced Samuel Mure Fergusson 6 & 5 in the third round before losing to Laurie Auchterlonie, the nephew of the 1902 U.S. Open winner of the same name, in the fourth round. This was the only time he played in the Amateur Championship.

=== 1899 U.S. Open ===
Walker placed tied for ninth in the 1899 U.S. Open, held 14–15 September 1899, at Baltimore Country Club in Baltimore, Maryland. He posted rounds of 84-86-77-86=333 but didn't win any prize money, finishing two shots out of the money.

He played in the 1900 Open Championship as a professional but withdrew after the first round.

== Death ==
Walker's date of death is unknown.
