= Henry Gullane =

Scottish professional golfer (1874–1907)

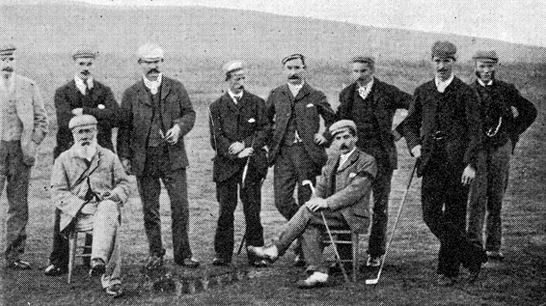
- Gullane (standing second from right), on 11 October 1894 at the New Luffness Competition

Personal information
- Full name: Henry Gullane
- Nickname: Harry
- Nationality: Scotland
- Born: 19 May 1874 North Berwick, Scotland
- Died: 2 May 1907 (aged 32) North Berwick, Scotland
- Spouse: Margaret Brown

Career
- Sport: Golf
- Status: Professional

Best results in major championships
- Masters Tournament: DNP
- PGA Championship: DNP
- U.S. Open: 8th: 1899
- The Open Championship: WD: 1896

Henry Gullane (19 May 1874 – 2 May 1907) was a Scottish professional golfer. Gullane finished in eighth place in the 1899 U.S. Open, held 14–15 September 1899, at Baltimore Country Club in Baltimore, Maryland.

== Early life ==
Henry Gullane was born on 19 May 1874 at 4 Market Place, North Berwick, Scotland, to James Gullane, a fisherman, and his wife Janet Gullane née Taylor. Harry and his brother Andrew were granted their professional tickets on the West Links in April 1893. Gullane played in the Open Championship at Muirfield in 1896. This was the last Open that Old Tom Morris played in at the age of 75. Gullane emigrated to America, sailing from Liverpool on the SS Rhynland of the Red Star Line and arrived in Philadelphia on 20 January 1897. In 1898 he was appointed assistant pro and greenkeeper at the Philadelphia Country Club, where he also held the course record of 77 strokes.

== Golf career ==
Gullane won the first professional golf tournament in the Philadelphia area, played in 1898 at the Huntingdon Valley Country Club. There were ten entries and the club provided a free lunch for the contestants. They played the nine-hole course four times each day to make it a 72-hole tournament. He had the winning score of 319 while Willie Anderson finished twelve strokes back in second place and Jimmy Campbell completed the North Berwick trio, finishing third. The purse totaled $150 and the winner received $100.

=== 1899 U.S. Open ===
His best finish in the U.S. Open Championship was eighth place at Baltimore Country Club in 1899 when he received $25 in prize money. The day before the championship they held a driving contest and Gullane finished second with a drive of 264 yards 2 feet 9 inches. Willie Hoare had the winning drive which was 269 yards 7 feet 6 inches. The big drives were long by 19th century standards as the gutta-percha ball was still in use at that time. In 1900 Gullane was the professional at the Philadelphia Cricket Club (Chestnut Hill, Pennsylvania). In April that year he partnered Willie Thompson of the Huntingdon Valley Country Club in an exhibition match against Harry Vardon at the Philadelphia Cricket Club. It was reported in The New York Times that Gullane outdrove Vardon by 10 to 15 yards. Vardon, however, won the match. Gullane entered the 1900 U.S. Open from Pittsburgh where he laid out the course for Pittsburgh Golf Club (Pennsylvania).

=== Golf course designs ===
Gullane was the first pro to be appointed to the nine-hole St. David's Golf Club in Wayne, Pennsylvania. He supervised the extension of that course to 18 holes which was completed in April 1899. Also that year Gullane laid out a nine-hole course at West Chester Golf and Country Club, Pennsylvania. In 1899, Gullane set a new course record at Cape May Golf Club (NJ) and in 1900 at Catasauqua Golf Club (PA).

At St. David's, Gullane was replaced by another Scottish professional, James Govan.

In 1908 The American Golfer magazine compiled a composite golf course taken from the best 18 holes in the USA. Among them were the 7th and 16th holes at St. David's, laid out by Gullane and the only course to have two holes featured. In 1914, when Ben Sayers visited his son George at Merion Cricket Club in Philadelphia, he played the course at St. David's every day. The nine-hole course at West Chester Golf and Country Club in Pennsylvania also remains as a testimony to Gullane's short life.

== Death ==
In 1901, Gullane returned to North Berwick permanently and five years later he married a local girl, Margaret Brown, and was back teaching on the West Links with his brother Andrew. In 1907, Henry and Margaret lived in a row of cottages at 5 Law Road and following a domestic argument Gullane struck his wife to the floor. Thinking he had killed her, Henry climbed North Berwick Law and in a state of remorse threw himself off the quarry, plunging 70 feet to his death. He was 32 years old and his wife Margaret survived the incident.
