= Jack Park =

Scottish professional golfer (1879–1935)

Personal information
- Full name: John Archibald Park
- Nickname: Jack
- Nationality: Scotland
- Born: 1879 Musselburgh, Scotland
- Died: 1935 (aged 55–56) East Hampton, New York, U.S.
- Spouse: Alison Middlemas
- Children: 2

Career
- Sport: Golf
- Status: Professional

Best results in major championships
- Masters Tournament: DNP
- PGA Championship: DNP
- U.S. Open: 6th: 1899
- The Open Championship: 40th: 1908

John Archibald Park (1879–1935) was a Scottish professional golfer. Park placed sixth in the 1899 U.S. Open, held 14–15 September 1899, at Baltimore Country Club in Baltimore, Maryland. Park also finished tied for ninth place in the 1901 U.S. Open held at Myopia Hunt Club and tied for tenth at the 1915 U.S. Open.

== Early life ==
Park was born in Musselburgh, Scotland, in 1879. He was the son of Willie Park Sr. (1834–1903) and his wife Susanna Park née Law (1837–1922).

== Golf career ==
At age 18, Park won an open tournament at Carnoustie in 1897. The field included James Braid, J.H. Taylor, Harry Vardon and Willie Fernie. In 1898 he emigrated to the United States to manage his brother's golf store at 25 W. 43rd Street, New York. He was head professional at Essex Country Club in New Jersey (1899–01), then went to Texas for a short period at Houston Country Club before going to Whitemarsh Country Club in Philadelphia where his tenure was from 1911–15.

Park also spent some time in Argentina where his brother Mungo Park Jr. had a lot of success. Jack was second to Mungo at the 1907 Argentine Open.

His longest posting was at Maidstone Golf Club on Long Island from 1915–24. In 1924 Jack and his brother Willie upgraded the existing 18-hole Maidstone course to a 36-hole layout, part of which was destroyed in a 1938 hurricane. In its current 27-hole configuration the course continues to be listed among the top 70 courses in America.

In 1926, the Philadelphia Evening Bulletin newspaper announced; "John A. Park, member of a family famous to golf for more than half a century, tomorrow becomes the professional of the Huntingdon Valley Country Club in succession to Jack Hobens....John A. Park is more devoted to the teaching of the links than his famed father, brother and uncle. He is an excellent player but is not given to treading the tournament circuit. He has been in the United States for 30 years, during which he has served as a professional at four clubs before Huntingdon Valley. His appointment was recommended to the officials of the Noble, PA organizations by (Jack) Hobens, a friend of long standing." Park only stayed at the Huntingdon Valley Country Club for one year. After leaving, Park remained in the East Hampton area of New York where he worked at Amagansett Country Club in Amagansett, New York, until 1928.

== Death ==
Park died in 1935 at East Hampton, Suffolk, New York.

== Results in major championships ==
Tournament	1897	1898	1899	1900	1901	1902	1903	1904	1905	1906	1907	1908	1909	1910	1911	1912	1913	1914	1915	1916	1917	1918	1919	1920	1921
U.S. Open	DNP	DNP	6	DQ	T9	25	?	?	?	?	?	?	?	?	?	WD	?	?	T10	?	NT	NT	CUT	?	62
The Open Championship	WD	WD	DNP	DNP	DNP	DNP	CUT	DNP	DNP	DNP	DNP	40	T51	T45	CUT	DNP	DNP	T73	NT	NT	NT	NT	NT	DNP	DNP

Note: Park played only in the U.S. Open and The Open Championship.

NT = No tournament
DNP = Did not play
CUT = Missed the cut
WD = Withdrew
? = Finish unknown
"T" indicates a tie for a place
Yellow background for top-10.

== Team appearances ==
- England–Scotland Professional Match (representing Scotland): 1909
