= Jack Park (rugby union) =

Scotland international rugby union player

- Born: Jack Park; 21 April 1913 [San Andres], Argentina
- Died: 2 October 1992 (aged 79) East Lothian, Scotland
- Notable relative(s): Willie Park Sr., grandfather Mungo Park Jr., father Willie Park Jr., uncle Jack Park, uncle

Rugby union career
- Position: Wing
Amateur team(s)
Years	Team	Apps	(Points)
- Royal HSFP
Provincial / State sides
Years	Team	Apps	(Points)
1933	Edinburgh District		
International career
Years	Team	Apps	(Points)
1934	Scotland	1	(0)

Jack Park (21 April 1913 – 2 October 1992) was a Scotland international rugby union player. He was born into the famous golfing Park dynasty; and although he competed in amateur golfing tournaments, he became more known for his rugby union exploits.

== Rugby Union career ==
=== Amateur career ===
Park played rugby union for Royal HSFP.

=== Provincial career ===
He played for Edinburgh District against Glasgow District in the 1933 inter-city match.

=== International career ===
Park was capped just the once by Scotland, against Wales in 1934.

== Military career ==
He was a doctor in the Royal Air Force.

== Other sports ==
=== Golf ===
He was notable for playing golf in his youth, playing in the Boys Amateur Golf Championship of 1930.

== Family ==
His grandfather was Willie Park Sr., the first winner of the British Open golf championship.

His uncles were the golfers Willie Park Jr. and Jack Park.

His parents were Mungo Park Jr. (1877-1960) and Grace Hamilton Morrison (1880-1956). Both parents were excellent golfers; Mungo winning the Argentine Open and Grace represented Scotland and winning the Argentine Ladies Open three times. They had a son Mungo Park (1903-1959) and a daughter Catherine Morrison Park (1907-1987), before Jack, the youngest, was born. His sister Catherine (Katie) also represented Scotland at golf.

Jack married Charlotte Cicely Bunge in 1943.

He died on 2 October 1992 in East Lothian.
