= Karel Paukert =

Czech-American organist (1935–2025)

Karel Paukert (January 1, 1935 – April 30, 2025) was a Czech-American organist, choir director and educator.

== Early years (in Europe) ==
Paukert was born on January 1, 1935, in Skuteč, then in Czechoslovakia. He graduated from the Prague Conservatory and the Ghent Conservatory, Belgium. He studied under organists Jan Bedřich Krajs and Gabriël Verschraegen.

== U.S. career ==
Paukert defected to the United States in 1965. He gained citizenship in 1972.

In 1965, following a national tour, Paukert became a professor at Washington University in St. Louis.

In 1968 Paukert moved from St. Louis to Chicago, to become a Professor of Organ at Northwestern University, a position he held until 1974. During his tenure at Northwestern, Paukert was also Organist Choirmaster of Saint Luke's Episcopal Church in Evanston, Illinois, and conducted the famed men's and boys' choir of the church.

In 1974 Paukert founded the Bach Week Festival, a music festival in Evanston dedicated to the music of Bach and his contemporaries. The festival was held annually for 51 years until its final occurrence in 2024 and featured leading international performers.

In 1974, Paukert moved to Cleveland, where he became curator of the music department at the Cleveland Museum of Art. After he retired from the Museum in 2003, he was named curator emeritus of its music department.

Paukert taught at the Cleveland Institute of Music as Professor of Organ and Church Music starting in 1976. At his retirement from the Institute in 2003, he was awarded an honorary doctorate.

From 1979 until 2023, Paukert was organist and choirmaster at St. Paul's Episcopal Church in Cleveland Heights, Ohio. In 2023 he was named Organist/Choirmaster Emeritus and/or Artist-in-Residence.

He made recordings for Azica Records.

== Death ==
Paukert died on April 30, 2025, at the age of 90.

== Discography ==
- Pamela Pecha, Janacek Chamber Orchestra, and Karel Paukert, Oboe Concerto in C Minor (Crystal Records, 1998)
- Karel Paukert, Noels (Azica Records, 2005)
- Karel Paukert, Aubade (Azica Records, 2006)
- Karel Paukert, Organ Music from Prague (Azica Records, 2006)
- Karel Paukert, J.S. Bach (Cleveland Museum of Art/Azica Records, 2009)
- Karel Paukert, Viva Italia: Organ Music from St. Paul's (Azica Records, 2009)
- Karel Paukert, Karel Paukert Plays the Hradetzky Organ at St. Christopher's by the River (unknown date and publisher)

== Awards ==
- Audience prize for improvisation, International Organ Festival, Haarlem, Netherlands (1964)
- Cleveland Institute of Music, honorary doctorate (2003)
- CMA/ASCAP Award for Adventurous Programming (2005)
- Academy of Performing Arts in Prague, honorary doctorate (2022)
- Ministry of Culture of the Czech Republic, award for lifelong concert and pedagogical activities and for sharing Czech interpretive and dramaturgical art (2022)

== Sources ==
Karel Paukert Obituary https://www.brown-forward.com/obituaries/karel-paukert

- St. Paul's Church, Cleveland, Staff List
- Cleveland Artist Award 1995 http://clevelandartsprize.org/awardees/Karel_Paukert.html
- Concert in Prague
- Karel Paukert discography at Discogs
