= Maidstone Club =

Private country club in East Hampton, NY, US

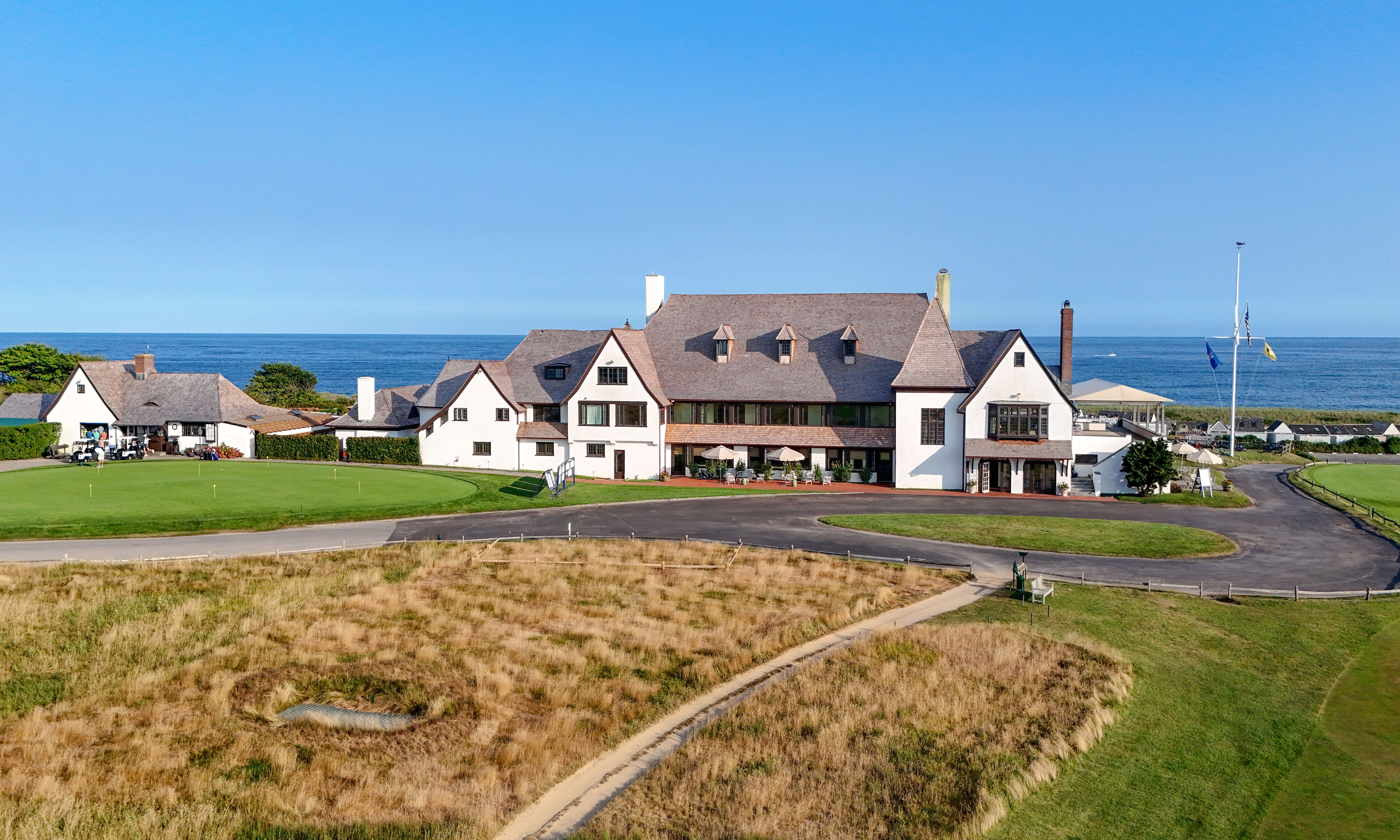
- Interactive map of Maidstone Club
- 40°57′10″N 72°10′39″W

Club information
- Location: East Hampton, New York; United States
- Established: 1891
- Type: Private
- Tota holes: 27
- Website: maidstoneclub.org
- Designed by: Willie Dunn – 1894 (7 holes); Seth Raynor – 1921; Willie Park, Jr. – 1924; Jack Park – 1924^{†}Ben Crenshaw – 2012
- Par: 72
- Length: 6,560 yd (6,000 m) Longest hole is 597 yd (546 m)
- Course rating: 73.0
- Slope rating: 139

The Maidstone Club is a private country club on the Atlantic Ocean in the village of East Hampton, New York. Maidstone has both an 18-hole and nine-hole private golf course. The architect of the golf course's club house was Roger Bullard.

== History ==
Maidstone logo

The club derives its name from the original name for East Hampton, which was Maidstone, named after Maidstone in England. It was founded as a 7-hole course in 1894 and expanded to 18 holes in 1899. The club was the summer retreat of New York City’s most wealthy and socially connected families. Maidstone is considered to be among the five most elite, prestigious and difficult to get into among private clubs in the Hamptons, alongside the Bathing Corporation of Southampton, the Meadow Club, the National Golf Links of America and the Shinnecock Hills Golf Club.

Jews were not admitted as members until the late 1970s. Through the 1990s and early 2000s, journalists reported that there were no Black members.

Several notable people have inquired about membership over the years and were summarily prevented from joining the club. In the 1950s, Groucho Marx was able to play as a member guest but was turned down as a potential member. George Plimpton and Diana Ross were also shunned. Ross was married to billionaire Norwegian shipping magnate Arne Næss, Jr., a member at Maidstone, however he resigned when his wife was denied membership. Donald Trump was a temporary member in the early 1980s, but was turned down as a permanent member.

Willie Dunn laid out the first course in 1894; it was but a rudimentary seven-hole layout. Seth Raynor drew up re-design plans in 1921. Then in 1924 Willie Park, Jr. and his brother Jack designed the 80-acre (320,000 m^{2}) Gardiner Peninsula addition. The expansion resulted in the club having two 18-hole courses, but this was reduced to the current 27-hole layout by the hurricane of 1938. Ben Crenshaw performed extensive renovations in 2012.

The Parks' routing on the 80 acres on Gardiner’s Peninsula and the remaining 50 acres introduces multiple hazards at various angles, including a marsh, Hook Pond, sand dunes, beach grass, reeds, well-placed bunkers, out of bounds and the ever-present wind.

In 2014, Maidstone was ranked #37 in Golf Magazine's "Top 100 Courses in the U.S." list, and #67 in their "Top 100 Courses in the World" list.

== West Course scorecard ==
Tee	Rating/Slope	1	2	3	4	5	6	7	8	9	Out	10	11	12	13	14	15	16	17	18	In	Total
Blue	73.0/139	424	537	408	176	325	403	341	151	415	3180	387	464	181	500	152	493	485	328	390	3380	6560
White	70.3/131	362	509	365	162	296	393	312	131	367	2897	360	395	164	454	129	481	470	287	367	3107	6004
Par	Par	4	5	4	3	4	4	4	3	4	35	4	4	3	5	3	5	5	4	4	37	72

== Facilities ==
The Maidstone Club features a private beach, pool, tennis house, and club house in addition to the golf course.
