= Fairmount Boulevard District =

Historic district in Ohio, United States

- U.S. National Register of Historic Places
- U.S. Historic district
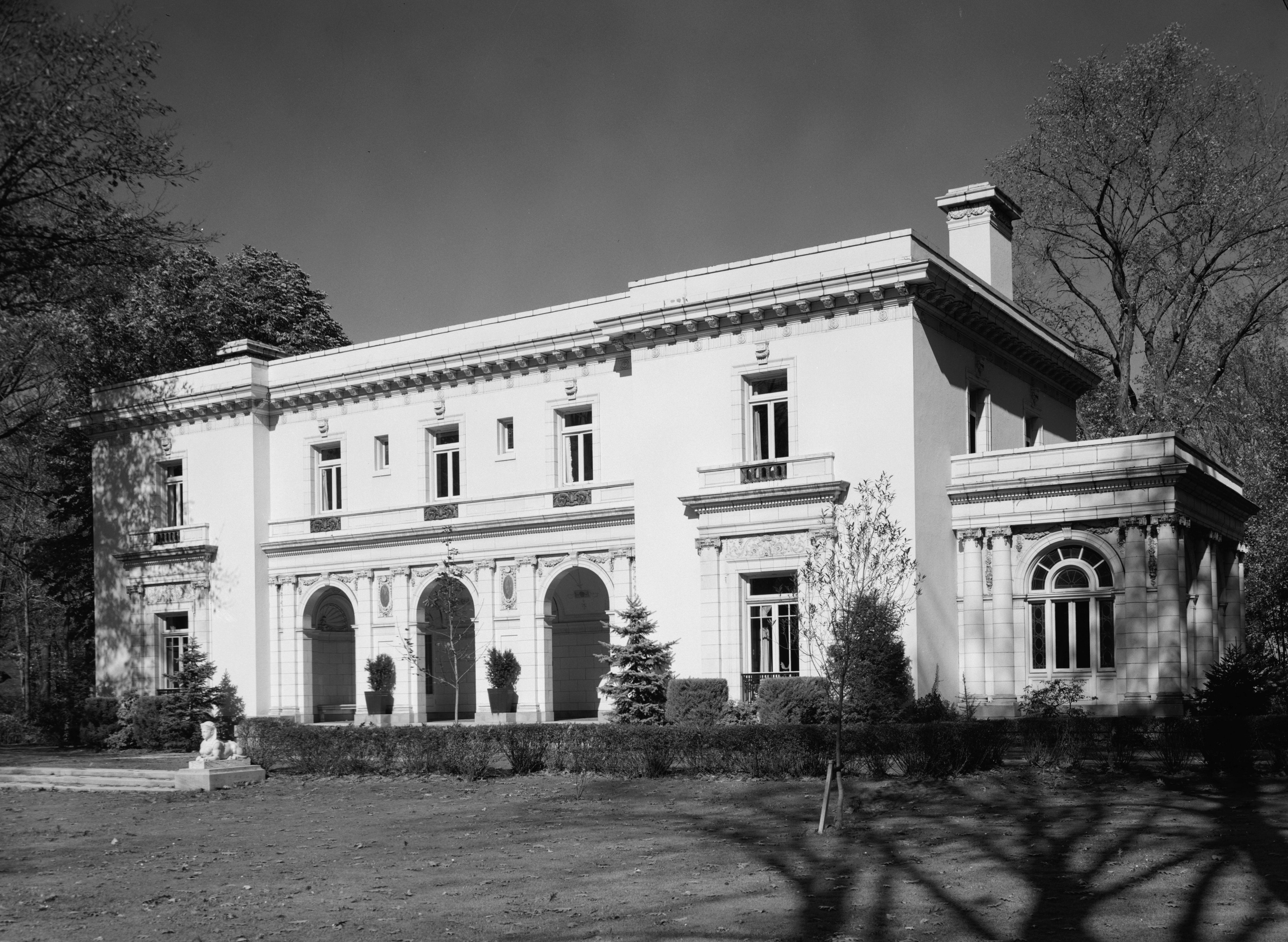
- The Tremaine-Gallagher House at 3001 Fairmount Boulevard

- Location within Ohio Location within the United States
- Location: 2485--3121 Fairmount Blvd., Cleveland Heights, Ohio
- Coordinates: 41°29′37″N 81°34′50″W
- Area: 130 acres (53 ha)
- Built: 1904
- Architect: Walker & Weeks; et al.
- Architectural style: Renaissance, Georgian, Jacobean
- NRHP reference No.: 76001391
- Added to NRHP: December 12, 1976

The Fairmount Boulevard District is a 130-acre (53 ha) historic district in Cleveland Heights, Ohio that was listed on the National Register of Historic Places in 1976.

The district is a cohesive area of upper-income suburban development dating from the World War I era.

The boulevard has a manicured appearance, with traffic lanes separated by a 60 foot median strip once a roadbed for streetcar tracks.

It includes examples of Renaissance, Georgian, and Jacobean architecture.

There are 94 contributing buildings, including the St. Paul's Episcopal Church.

Major architects represented include Walker and Weeks, Small and Rowley, Meade and Hamilton, Frederick Striebinger and Charles Schneider.

== History ==
The city's social, business and civic leaders were beginning to leave the inner city for the east side.

The eastern (upper) half of the boulevard between Coventry and Wellington Roads was owned by the North Union community of the Shaker religious sect from 1822 until 1889 when the colony disbanded.

The Van Sweringen brothers persuaded the Cleveland Railway Company to extend a branch line from the Cleveland terminus at University Circle up Cedar Glen and out along the boulevard. Once completed, land sales boomed along the eastern part of Fairmount Boulevard.

The Van Sweringens envisioned not country estates for the very wealthy, but a garden city with lots large enough for a substantial home and small enough for the average commuting businessman to maintain.

== See also ==
- Green Line (RTA Rapid Transit)
- Euclid Golf Allotment
