= Country Club of Detroit =

Country club in Michigan, U.S.

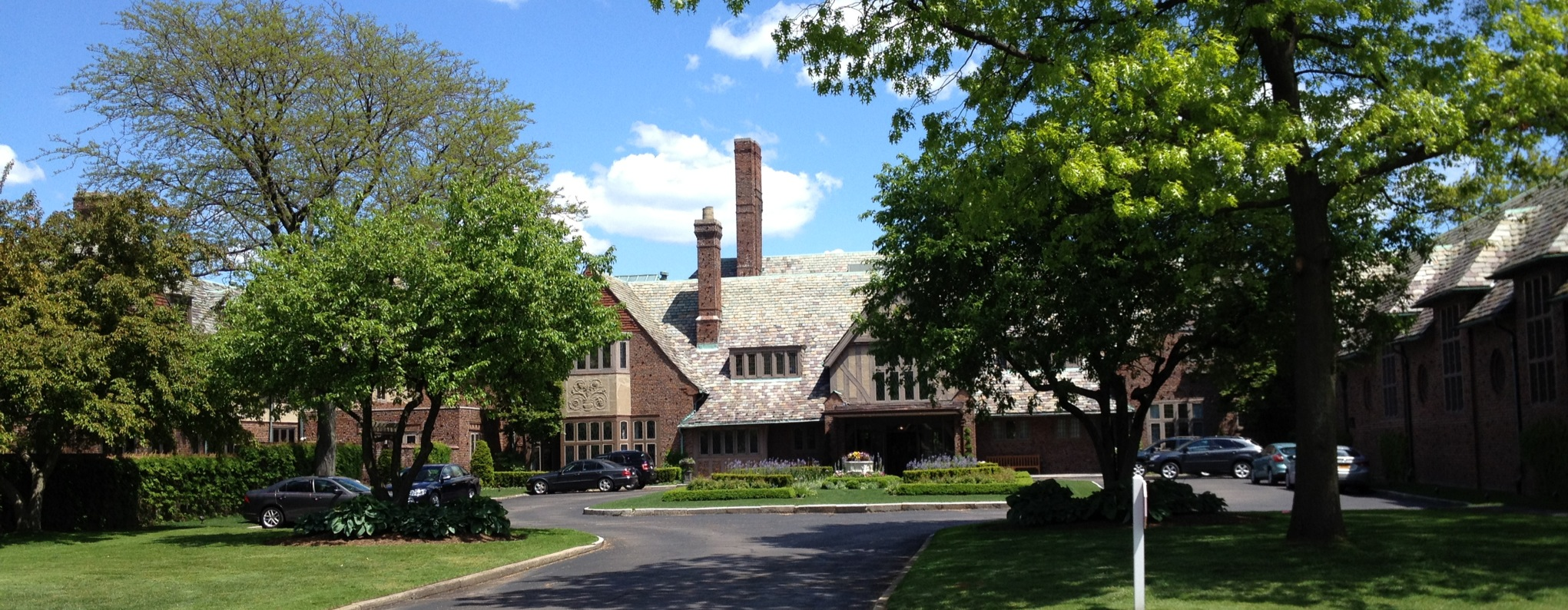
- Interactive map of Country Club of Detroit
- 42.4165°N 82.8976°W

Club information
- Location: Grosse Pointe Farms, Michigan, United States
- Established: 1897
- Type: Private
- Tota holes: 27
- Website: ccofd.com
- Designed by: Bert Way, C. H. Alison and H. S. Colt, redesigned by Robert Trent Jones(1952 and 1996), Tom Doak (2010)
- Par: 72
- Length: 7,100 yards (6,500 m)
- Course rating: 123.4

9-hole Par 3
- Designed by: Robert Trent Jones (1964)
- Length: 1,433 yards (1,310 m)

Country Club of Detroit, founded in 1897, is a private country club in Grosse Pointe Farms, Michigan. The architectural firm of Smith Hinchman & Grylls, known today as the SmithGroup, designed the Tudor Revival styled country club in 1927. H. S. Colt redesigned the country club's original golf course—designed by Bert Way—in 1912 and his partner Charles Alison later modified the design. In 1952, the club commissioned Robert Trent Jones, Sr. to complete a full redesign, and in 2011, the club fully renovated the course. in order to return to the original Colt and Alison design with a slightly updated interpretation.

Country Club of Detroit has twice hosted the U.S. Amateur, first in 1915 where Robert A. Gardner won and again in 1954 when Arnold Palmer won his first USGA title. In 2004 the Country Club of Detroit hosted Turning Point Invitational, which brought many past U.S. Amateur champions together to compete including Phil Mickelson and Mark O'Meara. The course hosted the 66th U.S. Senior Amateur in 2021.

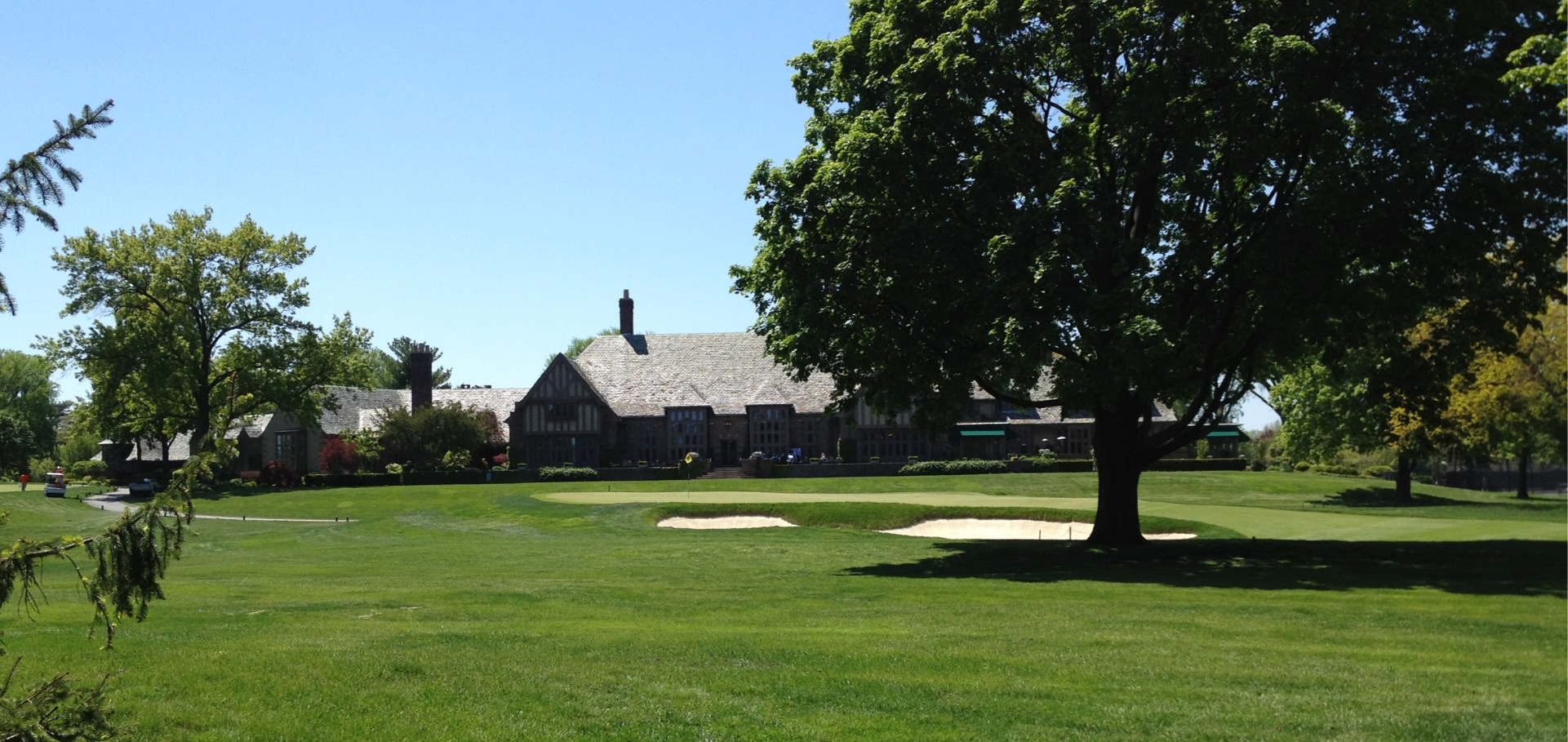
The clubhouse overlooking the 18th green

== See also ==
- Detroit Golf Club
