= 1899 U.S. Open (golf) =

Coordinates: 39.441°N 76.664°W

Tournament information
- Dates: September 14–15, 1899
- Location: Baltimore, Maryland
- Course: Baltimore Country Club
- Organized by: USGA
- Format: Stroke play − 72 holes

Statistics
- Field: 72
- Prize fund: $750
- Winner's share: $150

Champion
- (Scotland) Willie Smith
- 315

Location in the United States
Location in Maryland

The 1899 U.S. Open was the fifth U.S. Open, held September 14–15 at Baltimore Country Club in Baltimore, Maryland. Willie Smith won his only major title, a record eleven strokes ahead of three runners-up.

On Thursday, Smith and future four-time champion Willie Anderson co-led with 77 in the morning and Anderson took the lead in the afternoon at 158, with Smith a stroke back. In the third round on Friday morning, Anderson's 85 allowed Smith to take a four-stroke lead over Alex Campbell, and his 77 in the afternoon distanced him from the field; Campbell ballooned to 94 and fell to twelfth.

Playing out of Midlothian Country Club in Chicago, Smith was the only player to record three sub-80 rounds, and did not score higher than a seven on any hole in the championship. Val Fitzjohn, George Low, and Bert Way tied for second, eleven strokes behind. Smith's margin of victory was the largest in the U.S. Open for 101 years, until Tiger Woods won by fifteen shots in 2000. Smith's brother Alex, a future two-time champion, finished seventh.

Smith won a gold medal and was given custody of the Championship Cup for a year.

== Round summaries ==
=== First round ===
Thursday, September 14, 1899 (morning)

| Place | Player | Score |
|---|---|---|
| 1 | (Scotland) Willie Anderson | 77 |
| 1 | (Scotland) Willie Smith | 77 |
| 3 | (England) Bert Way | 80 |
| T4 | (Scotland) Henry Gullane | 81 |
| T4 | (England) Horace Rawlins | 81 |
| T6 | (Scotland) George Low | 82 |
| T6 | (Scotland) Alexander Patrick | 82 |
| T6 | (Scotland) Writ Thompson | 82 |
| T9 | (Scotland) Alex Campbell | 83 |
| T9 | (Scotland) David Foulis | 83 |
| T9 | Arthur Smith | 83 |

=== Second round ===
Thursday, September 14, 1899 (afternoon)

| Place | Player | Score |
|---|---|---|
| 1 | (Scotland) Willie Anderson | 77-81=158 |
| 2 | (Scotland) Willie Smith | 77-82=159 |
| 3 | (Scotland) George Low | 82-79=161 |
| T4 | (Scotland) Alex Campbell | 83-80=163 |
| T4 | (Scotland) Alex Smith | 82-81=163 |
| T6 | (Scotland) Val Fitzjohn | 85-80=165 |
| T6 | Alexander Patrick | 82-83=165 |
| T6 | (England) Bert Way | 80-85=165 |
| 9 | (England) Horace Rawlins | 81-85=166 |
| 10 | (Scotland) Henry Gullane | 81-86=167 |

=== Third round ===
Friday, September 15, 1899 (morning)

| Place | Player | Score |
|---|---|---|
| 1 | (Scotland) Willie Smith | 77-82-79=238 |
| 2 | (Scotland) Alex Campbell | 83-80-79=242 |
| T3 | (Scotland) Willie Anderson | 77-81-85=243 |
| T3 | (Scotland) Jack Park | 88-80-75=243 |
| 5 | (Scotland) Val Fitzjohn | 85-80-79=244 |
| T6 | (Scotland) Alex Smith | 82-81-82=245 |
| T6 | (England) Bert Way | 80-85-80=245 |
| T8 | (Scotland) Henry Gullane | 81-86-80=247 |
| T8 | (Scotland) Peter Walker | 84-86-77=247 |
| 10 | (Scotland) George Low | 82-79-89=250 |

=== Final round ===
Friday, September 15, 1899 (afternoon)

| Place | Player | Score | Money ($) |
|---|---|---|---|
| 1 | (Scotland) Willie Smith | 77-82-79-77=315 | 150 |
| T2 | (Scotland) Val Fitzjohn | 85-80-79-82=326 | 125 |
| T2 | (Scotland) George Low | 82-79-89-76=326 | 125 |
| T2 | (England) Bert Way | 80-85-80-81=326 | 125 |
| 5 | (Scotland) Willie Anderson | 77-81-85-84=327 | 80 |
| 6 | (Scotland) Jack Park | 88-80-75-85=328 | 70 |
| 7 | (Scotland) Alex Smith | 82-81-82-85=330 | 50 |
| 8 | (Scotland) Henry Gullane | 81-86-80-84=331 | 25 |
| T9 | (Scotland) Laurie Auchterlonie | 86-87-82-78=333 | 0 |
| T9 | (Scotland) Peter Walker | 84-86-77-86=333 | 0 |
