= Outpost Club =

Coordinates: 41°43′8″N 83°39′17″W

- Founded: February 2010
- Website: www.outpostclub.com

The Outpost Club (“OC”) is an invitation-only, national golf society in the United States. Modeled after historic golf societies in Great Britain, it does not own a course but members can play more than 50 events each year at Top 100 courses around the world. These events range in format from members only, to members and guests, to matches against other private clubs.

== History ==
The Outpost Club was formed on February 11, 2010 by Quentin Lutz, Colin Sheehan, and Will Smith. Lutz previously worked for the American Golf Course Designer Arthur Hills and is the youngest person ever to play the complete list of Golf Magazine's Top 100 Courses in the World. Colin Sheehan is the author of A History of The United States Amateur Championship, 1895-2005 and head coach of the Yale University golf team. Will Smith has worked for Tom Doak and Gil Hanse.

== Charitable contributions ==
The OC conducts many events each year for charity. These events have been sponsored by companies such as, TRUElinks, Ralph Lauren, Macallan, Highland Park and Dunning Golf. Organizations they have raised money for include: Troops First, Wounded Warrior Project, American Cancer Society, and St Jude's.
