= George Low Sr. =

Scottish-American professional golfer (1874–1950)

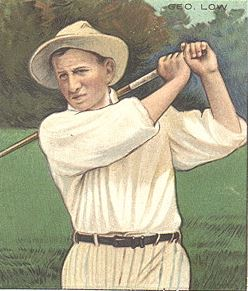
- Low (c. 1910)

Personal information
- Full name: George Anderson Low Sr.
- Nationality: Scotland; United States
- Born: November 1, 1874 Carnoustie, Angus, Scotland
- Died: April 17, 1950 (aged 75) Clearwater, Florida
- Height: 5 ft 7.5 in (1.71 m)
- Weight: 165 lb (75 kg)
- Spouse: Helen Beale Reid
- Children: 2

Career
- Sport: Golf
- Status: Professional
- Professional wins: 4

Best results in major championships
- Masters Tournament: DNP
- PGA Championship: DNP
- U.S. Open: T2: 1899
- The Open Championship: DNP

George Anderson Low Sr. (November 1, 1874 – April 17, 1950) was a Scottish-American professional golfer. Low finished tied for second place in the 1899 U.S. Open championship. In total, he had five top-10 finishes in the U.S. Open. He won the Metropolitan Open in 1906 and the Florida Open three times.

== Early life ==
Low was born in Carnoustie, Scotland, in 1874. He learned the trade of golf club maker in the workshop of Archie Simpson in Carnoustie. He lived in Aberdeen, Scotland, for a time and honed his considerable golf skills while living there. Low emigrated to the United States in 1899, arriving on St. Patrick's Day, and quickly acclimated himself to the American golf scene by finishing tied second in the 1899 U.S. Open held at Baltimore Country Club in Baltimore, Maryland. He won $125 for his sterling performance.

In 1900, Low accompanied Harry Vardon for a portion of his American exhibition tour. That same year, Low finished sixth in the 1900 U.S. Open and finished tied ninth in the 1901 U.S. Open. Low won the Metropolitan Open in 1906 and the Florida Open three times. In 1906 Low was appointed as the first president of the Eastern Professional Golfer's Association, which predated the PGA of America.

== Golf career ==
Low made a name for himself as a club maker at Dyker Meadow Golf Club in Brooklyn, New York, and he took that business with him to Baltusrol Golf Club in Springfield Township, Union County, New Jersey, on May 1, 1903, where he served as the green superintendent and golf professional for many years, living and raising his family on the grounds of the club. He advertised his business regularly in the golf magazines. In addition to his skill as a club maker, Low was a superb player. As of 1915 he had tied his own course record of 3-under-par 71 on the par 74 Baltusrol course no less than a dozen times. That same year he placed seventh in the 1915 U.S. Open held on his home course at Baltusrol.

Low's biggest challenge as a club maker occurred in March 1909 when Baltusrol's original clubhouse burned down. Low's repair shop was saved, but some 400 sets of members' clubs were destroyed. In those days there were no standardized sets of clubs, and each golfer's assortment of clubs was highly individualized. Low must have suffered the tortures of the damned as he responded to each replacement order, and he must have earned a pretty penny as he did so. But, as one newspaper observed, Low suffered large losses to his own account in the fire so that what he made in sales was partially offset by his losses in the fire.

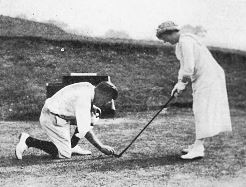
Low giving a golf lesson to a woman at Baltusrol (c. 1912)

In 1921, Low taught the game of golf to champion boxer Jack Dempsey. Dempsey thought golf was good training for his boxing career. Dempsey discovered the game quite by accident. In 1920 while on the coast he had occasion to see several professionals in action. He immediately became interested and decided to try his hand at the Scottish pastime, but he soon found that hitting the little white pill was much harder than it appeared to be.

Among the pros Dempsey met were George Low, the popular Baltusrol club player and Tommy Kerrigan, the sharpshooter of the Siwanoy Country Club. Each pro invited Dempsey to play over their course when he came east. Summit, New Jersey, the home of Freddie Welsh's health farm, where Dempsey trained, is near the Baltusrol club, so that when he went to Summit the title holder wasted no time in looking up his old friend Low. Since then Dempsey played a round daily. And he intended to play one round a day, or as often as possible, until he started strenuous training, three weeks before the time of his next fight. He had developed an interest in the game, liked it, and found it a big help in his training. For, as he said, "it takes a person out into the air and makes a pleasure of walking".

In 1913, Low designed the Weequahic Park Golf Course located in Newark, New Jersey. That same year, he played in the famous 1913 U.S. Open held at The Country Club in Brookline, Massachusetts, when the unknown amateur, Francis Ouimet, would win his one and only U.S. Open title.

Low resigned from Baltusrol in October 1925, stating that he intended to start a golf course architecture business with Herbert Strong, an Englishman who was his counterpart at The Apawamis Club in Westchester County, New York. This planned business venture with Strong, however, failed to materialize. In 1928 Low returned to live in Scotland, living off profits made from investments in the period of price increases on Wall Street in the 1920s. However, when the stock market crashed in 1929 he needed to go back to work and in late 1930 he returned to the United States and became the professional at Huntingdon Valley Country Club, located seven miles northeast of Philadelphia, Pennsylvania. At the age of 60, Low qualified for the 1934 U.S. Open at Merion Golf Club in Ardmore, Pennsylvania. In 1936, prior to his retirement years in Florida, Low and his son operated a driving range in Jenkintown, Pennsylvania. Low's tenure at the Huntingdon Valley Country Club in Philadelphia ended in November 1938 when the Philadelphia Inquirer newspaper announced that Joe Kirkwood would be replacing Low. The Inquirer noted; "The change occasioned some surprise, for while it was known that Huntingdon Valley was looking for a younger man for its pro staff, it was understood that anyone selected would be an assistant to George." After leaving Huntingdon Valley he operated a public driving range "George Low's Driving Range," in Flourtown, nearby Philadelphia suburb.

== Personal life ==
Low and his wife Helen Beale Reid—whom he married on September 14, 1909—had two children, son George Jr. and daughter Dorothy. George Low Jr., born 1912 in Springfield, New Jersey, was a noted golfer and designer of putters.

Low, who became an American citizen on July 25, 1944, died in Clearwater, Florida, on April 17, 1950.

== Results in major championships ==
Tournament	1899	1900	1901	1902	1903	1904	1905	1906	1907	1908	1909
U.S. Open	T2	6	T9	T12	?	T23	15	T11	T5	T12	T28

Tournament	1910	1911	1912	1913	1914	1915	1916	1917	1918	1919
U.S. Open	T12	T15	?	?	?	7	?	NT	NT	T41

Note: Low played only in the U.S. Open.

NT = No tournament
DNP = Did not play
? = Unknown
"T" indicates a tie for a place
Yellow background for top-10
