= St. Paul's Episcopal Church (Cleveland Heights, Ohio) =

Historic church in Ohio, United States

- U.S. Historic district – Contributing property
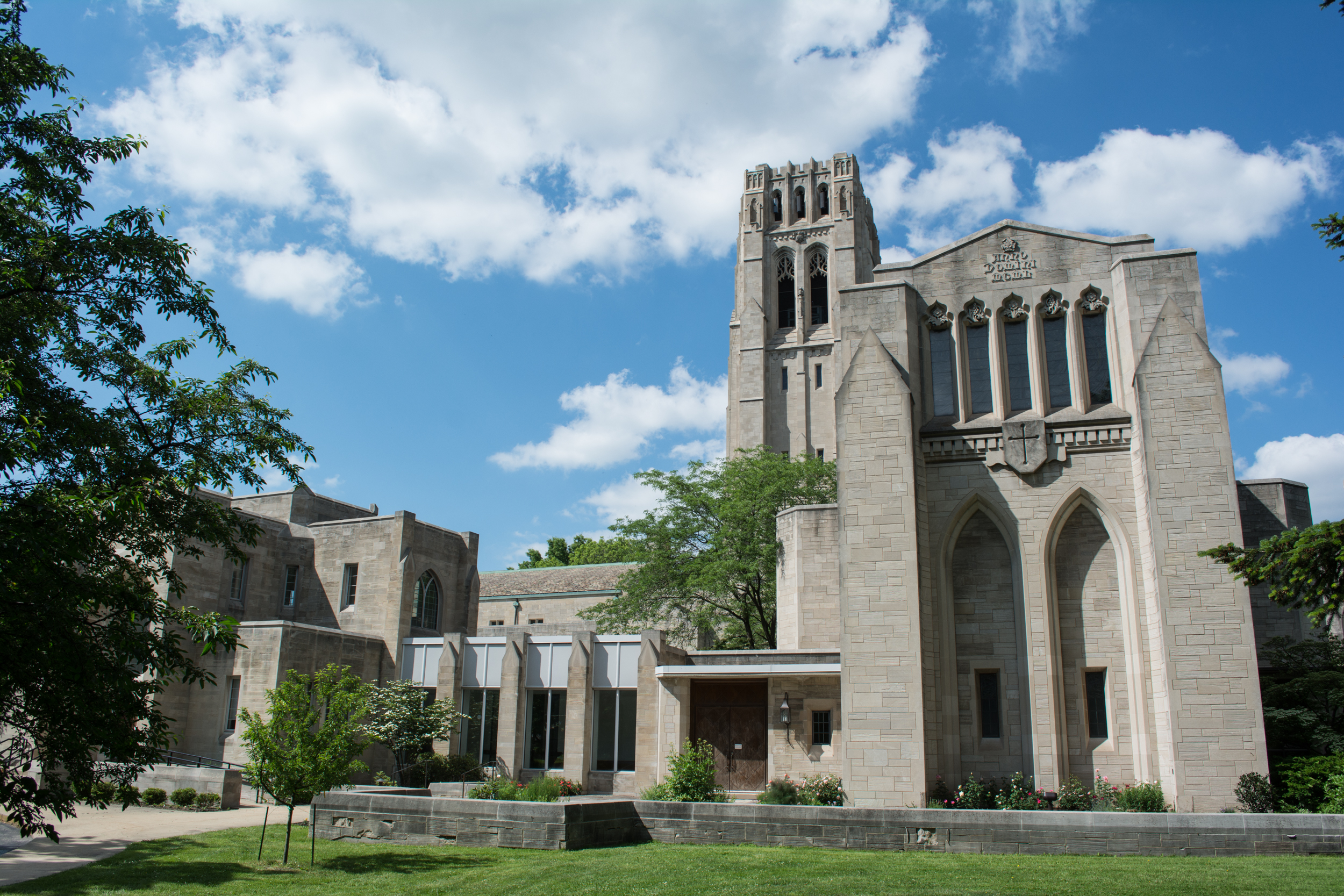
- Looking north at the new narthex and bell tower of St. Paul's Episcopal Church

- Location within Ohio Location within the United States
- Location: 2747 Fairmount Blvd., Cleveland Heights, Ohio, U.S.
- Coordinates: 41°29′44″N 81°34′52″W
- Built: 1927
- Architect: Walker & Weeks
- Part of: Fairmount Boulevard District (ID76001391)
- Designated CP: December 12, 1976

St. Paul's Episcopal Church is a parish of the Episcopal Church in Cleveland Heights, Ohio. St. Paul's is a leading church and has the largest congregation in the Episcopal Diocese of Ohio.

The church building is a Cleveland Heights landmark. Located at 2747 Fairmount Blvd, it is a contributing property in the Fairmount Boulevard District, which is listed on the National Register of Historic Places.

In 2015, the church reported 1,507 members; in 2023, it reported 1,108 members. No membership statistics were reported in 2024 national parochial reports. Plate and pledge financial support reported by the church in 2023 was $1,874,165. Average Sunday Attendance (ASA) reported in 2024 was 247 persons. This was a relative decrease on ASA of 378 in 2016.

== History ==
St. Paul's was first established in the city of Cleveland, Ohio on October 26, 1846. The congregation did not have its own building until 1851, as a frame building completed in 1849 burned completely. A small brick church in the Gothic Revival style was completed for the parish at Euclid and Sheriff (East 4th) Streets by 1858. St. Paul's congregation outgrew the church, however, as well as a subsequent building at East 40th Street (later sold to the Roman Catholic Church, and renamed the Church of the Conversion of St. Paul the Apostle in 1930). The first service at St. Paul's, Cleveland Heights, was on April 25, 1928. The church was designed by J. Byers Hayes of Walker & Weeks in the English Gothic style. The present nave was dedicated in 1951. Martin Luther King Jr. spoke there in May 1963 (months before the March on Washington for Jobs and Freedom).

The early music instrument ensemble Apollo's Fire recorded their 2018 album Songs of Orpheus at St. Paul's. The album won the 2019 Grammy Award for Best Classical Vocal Solo.

== Organs ==
The nave houses three pipe organs. The most notable of these three organs is a 1952 instrument by local builder Walter Holtkamp. In the late 1980s, the church installed an instrument by the Austrian builder Gerhard Hradetzky. Hradetky's instrument is installed in the rear gallery of the sanctuary. The most recent organ the church has taken possession of is an organ positive by Vladimir Slajch. The current organist and choirmaster of St. Paul's is Kevin Jones, who succeeded Karel Paukert.

The Holtkamp organ is considered the "definitive" example for its builder.
