= Mungo Park Jr. =

Scottish golfer and golf course architect (1877–1960)

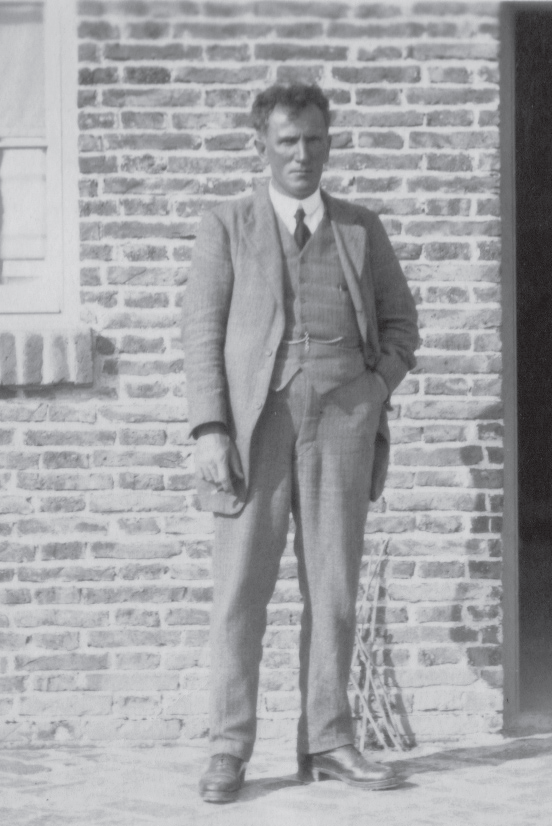
- Park in 1930

Personal information
- Full name: Mungo Park Jr.
- Nationality: Scotland
- Born: 9 January 1877 Musselburgh, Scotland
- Died: 12 February 1960 (aged 83) Haddington, Scotland
- Children: Jack Park

Career
- Sport: Golf
- Status: Professional
- Professional wins: 3

Best results in major championships
- Masters Tournament: DNP
- PGA Championship: DNP
- U.S. Open: WD: 1898
- The Open Championship: 41st: 1896

Mungo Park Jr. (9 January 1877 – 12 February 1960) was a pioneer in South American golf and golf clubmaking. Park was also a successful golfer and golf course architect. He won the Argentine Open three times, including the inaugural championship in 1905. He was part of the famous Park family from Musselburgh that won a total seven Open Championships in the 19th century.

== Early years and family ==
Park was born in Musselburgh, Scotland (near Edinburgh) on 9 January 1877. His father, Willie, was one of Scotland's top golfers, who won the first Open Championship in 1860 and Mungo (nicknamed Mungo Jr., although that was not his father's name) learned golf from childhood. Willie Park Sr. won three more Open Championships. His uncle, Mungo, for whom Mungo "Jr." was named, also won the Open in 1874. His brother Willie Park Jr. was also an Open champion (1887 and 1889)

At age 19, in 1897, he went to New York, sailing on the RMS Teutonic, to open a branch of his brother's business but this only lasted one, or at most two, years as Mungo was advertising for a professional position for 1898. During his time in New York, he laid out the nine hole Dutchess Golf Club course at Poughkeepsie, New York in 1897 then began 1898 as the professional to the Dyker Meadow Club in Brooklyn, New York.

Park worked at Mount Anthony in Bennington, Vermont until the end of 1900, when he returned to Scotland to marry and take up the post of General Manager at Huntecombe, his brother Willie's enterprise in Oxfordshire.

== Argentina ==
By 1903, Park went to Argentina where golf was not new, there were already six courses and an amateur championship had been contested since 1895, and served as a professional. He won the country's first Argentine Open in 1905, a feat he repeated in 1907 and 1912, and laid out a course in Buenos Aires at San Andrés, in 1907. His wife, Grace, a formidable player over many years, was the country's first Ladies' Open champion.

== Later years ==
Park was reported as "newly returned from South America" when he competed in the Scottish Professional Championship in May 1914. In February 1915, he enlisted in the Royal Army Medical Corps and served as a private with the 73rd Field Ambulance in France until his discharge in May 1919.

After the war, he returned to Argentina and again to the United States in 1923 to complete the work done by Willie, now in failing health, at St Johnsbury Country Club in Vermont.

Although he spent that winter, and the next, in Argentina, Mungo remained in the United States until 1936 with spells as professional at rather eccentric resorts, including the Victorian castle run on Quaker principles at Lake Mohonk, New York, and the Castle Hot Springs resort in Arizona.

== Golf course architect ==
Park built many courses in Argentina, but many have disappeared. The most prestigious of the courses he had built is the San Andres Golf Club in 1907. The course remains active.

== Family ==
Park married Grace Morrison in 1901. They had three children Mungo III, Catherine and Jack. Grace was a useful golfer. In May 1902 she played for Scotland against Ireland and England in international matches at Royal Cinque Ports Golf Club and reached the semi-final of the British Ladies Amateur Golf Championship the following week. She won the Argentine Ladies Open in 1904, 1909 and 1910. Catherine, known as Katie, was also a Scottish international golfer.

== Death ==
He died in Haddington, East Lothian, Scotland on 12 February 1960.

== Results in major championships ==
| Tournament | 1894 | 1895 | 1896 | 1897 | 1898 | 1899 | 1900 | 1901 |
|---|---|---|---|---|---|---|---|---|
| U.S. Open | DNP | DNP | DNP | DNP | WD | DNP | DNP | DNP |
| The Open Championship | WD | DNP | 41 | DNP | DNP | DNP | DNP | CUT |

Note: Park played only in The Open Championship and U.S. Open.

DNP = Did not play
CUT = Missed the cut
WD = Withdrew
