= Baltimore Country Club =

Private club in Baltimore, Maryland, U.S.

Coordinates: 39.442°N 76.663°W

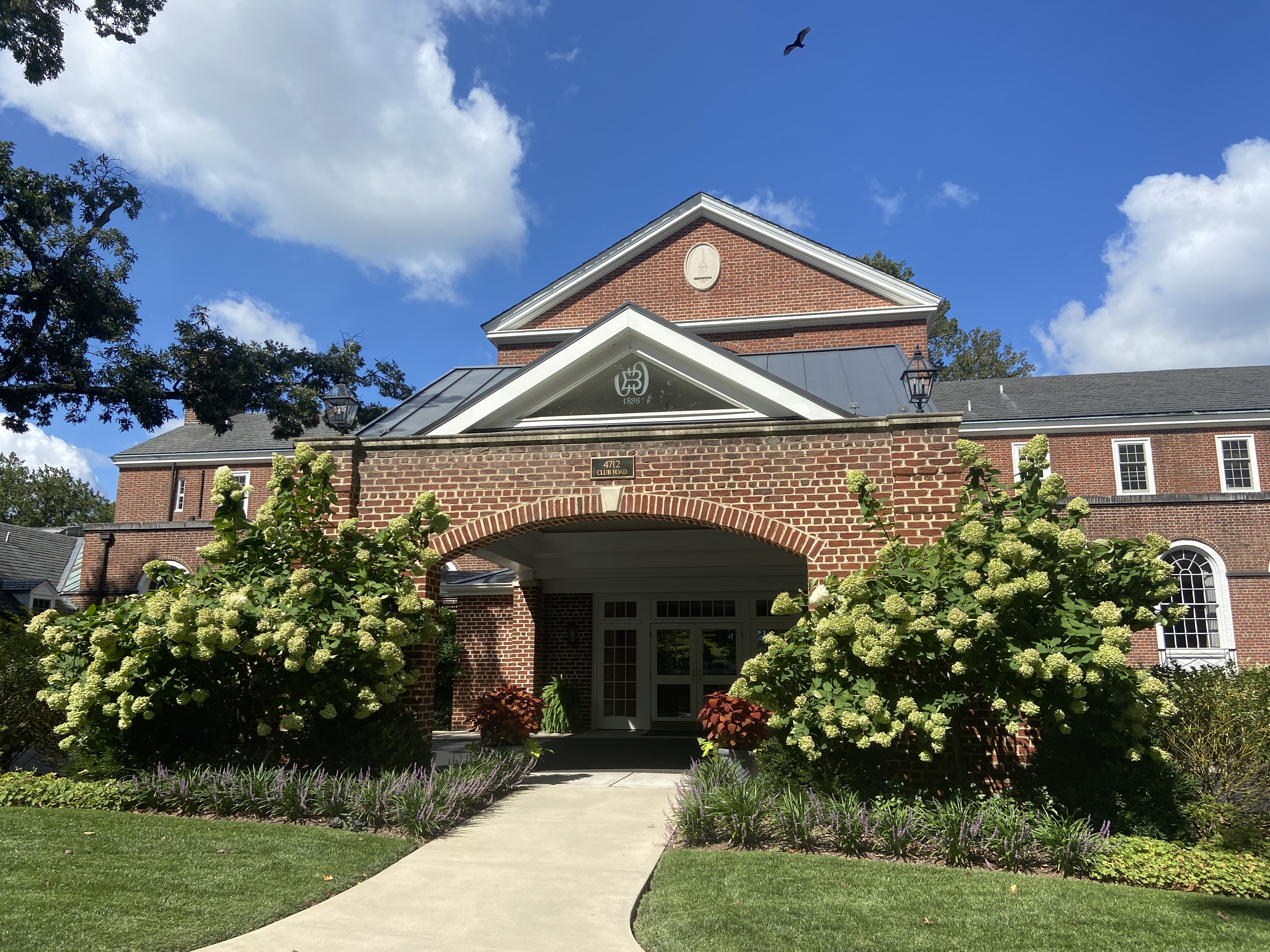
- Roland Park Clubhouse
- Interactive map of Baltimore Country Club

Club information
- Location: Baltimore (Roland Park) and Lutherville, Maryland
- Established: January 13, 1898
- Type: Private
- Total holes: 36
- Tournaments: 1899 U.S. Open; 1928 PGA Championship; 1988 U.S. Women's Open; 1932 U.S. Amateur; 1965 Walker Cup; 2007–09 Senior Players Championship; 2017–2018 Big Ten Men's Golf Championship; 2026 U.S. Senior Amateur; 2031 U.S. Women's Amateur
- Website: bcc1898.com

East Course at Five Farms
- Designed by: A. W. Tillinghast; Keith Foster (2015 restoration)
- Par: 70
- Length: 7,181 yards (6,566 m)
- Course rating: 75.1
- Slope rating: 141

West Course at Five Farms
- Designed by: Redesigned in 1990 by Bob Cupp and Tom Kite
- Par: 72
- Length: 6,795 yards (6,213 m)
- Course rating: 73.0
- Slope rating: 133

Baltimore Country Club is a private club in Baltimore, Maryland, with two campuses, one in the city's Roland Park neighborhood and the other in the north suburb of Lutherville. It is one of only twelve clubs nationwide to operate two campuses. The club was founded on January 13, 1898, and hosted the U.S. Open the following year. Its original golf course at the Roland Park campus was the first 18-hole course built in the state of Maryland. The USGA lists Baltimore Country Club as one of the first 100 clubs established in the United States.

The club has hosted a U.S. Open, a PGA Championship, a Walker Cup, a U.S. Men's Amateur, a U.S. Women's Open, and a Senior PGA Tour major – one of only two clubs in the country to do so. In addition to its two golf courses, BCC operates outdoor tennis, pickleball, platform tennis, single & doubles squash, three swimming pools, a duckpin bowling alley, two fitness centers, and dining at both clubhouses. In 2013, Links magazine named Baltimore Country Club as one of the 100 Most Prestigious Clubs in the World. Its East Course at the Five Farms location was ranked 75th best course in the United States by Golf Magazine in 2020. The Club proudly ranks #39 on Club Leader Forum's 2025-2026 Top 150 Platinum Clubs of America and made its debut at #103 on the 2024-2025 Top 150 Platinum Clubs of the World.

== History ==
The club opened in 1898 in its 125-acre (51 ha) Roland Park location with a membership of approximately 1,000. Just one year after opening, the Club hosted the fifth United States Open Championship, which was won by Willie Smith of Scotland. By the 1920s the decision was made to acquire land to the north of the city and expand the popular golfing amenities to a second location. The East Course at Five Farms, designed by A. W. Tillinghast, officially opened in September 1926. Two years later, this new course held the 1928 PGA Championship.

In October 1930, the Roland Park Clubhouse sustained fire damage, and prior to completing repairs, it was virtually destroyed by a second fire on January 5, 1931. The new "in-town" Clubhouse was formally opened on April 1, 1932. The Federal-style detailing of the Georgian Room, the paneling and black Belgian marble of the foyer, and the rough stone and pine of the Grille remain practically unchanged to this date. The duckpin bowling lanes were built in 1932 and remain in use today. During the late 1930s and early 1940s the grass tennis courts at Roland Park were selected by the National Lawn Tennis Association to host the qualifying rounds for the Davis Cup matches. Teams from Australia, Cuba, Japan, Mexico, Spain, and the United States all participated. The Roland Park Golf Course was officially closed in 1962 when all of the property on the west side of Falls Road was sold. That same year, the West Course at Five Farms opened. Two years later, the stately Olivier Mansion, which served as the original Five Farms Clubhouse, was demolished and replaced with a new building.

The businessman Nicholas Mangione alleged that he experienced anti-Italian discrimination at the Baltimore Country Club during the 1970s.

Squash courts, now international, were added to the Roland Park facility in 1963. The Club continues to host professional squash tournaments. The Club expanded its racquets program and added paddle tennis courts to the Roland Park campus in 1976. The club's swim complex was first built circa 1960. Renovations began some thirty years later, and the current facility, consisting of three independent pools, opened at Five Farms in 1996. New tennis courts, also at Five Farms, debuted in 2007.

Starting in the fall of 2021, the clubhouse at Five Farms underwent a major renovation. The renovation remodeled nearly all of the first floor of the building, expanding the grill, adding a formal dining room, outdoor covered bar area and a rooftop bar. It opened in late summer of 2022.

== Golf courses and rankings ==
Its current golf facility at Five Farms has two courses, the East Course and the West Course. Its East Course was designed by A. W. Tillinghast in 1926. In 2015, Keith Foster was brought in to restore the course. He removed trees, realigned the bunkers, upgraded the greens complexes, and re-grassed the fairways. The East Course has received numerous accolades and still enjoys praise from numerous golf organizations:

Rank	Course	Organization	List	Edition
39	East Course at Five Farms	Golfweek	Golfweek's Best 2020: Top 200 Classic Courses	2020
52	East Course at Five Farms	Outpost Club	Outpost Club US Top 100	2021
65	East Course at Five Farms	Top 100 Golf Courses	Top 100 Golf Courses of the USA 2020	2020
75	East Course at Five Farms	Golf Magazine	Top 100 Courses in the U.S.	2020–2021
80	East Course at Five Farms	Outpost Club	Outpost Club World Top 100	2022
102	East Course at Five Farms	Golf Digest	America's Second 100 Greatest Golf Courses	2021–2022

East Course at Five Farms
Tee	Rating/Slope	1	2	3	4	5	6	7	8	9	Out	10	11	12	13	14	15	16	17	18	In	Total
Black	75.1/141	458	496	427	157	504	586	379	362	202	3571	457	433	399	189	607	452	451	238	384	3610	7181
Blue	72.9/136	436	456	379	150	452	574	354	360	180	3341	385	427	380	164	574	425	420	180	368	3323	6664
White	70.6/129	408	418	361	138	391	566	331	307	151	3071	348	383	369	145	559	411	397	156	362	3130	6201
Gold	68.8/128	400	418	347	138	385	504	331	307	151	2981	348	383	311	145	503	406	486	131	354	2967	5948
Par	Men's	4	4	4	3	4	5	4	4	3	35	4	4	4	3	5	4	4	3	4	35	70
SI	Men's	5	1	11	17	7	3	9	13	15		12	2	10	18	4	6	8	16	14
Red	73.6/140	395	410	351	124	315	501	331	303	125	2855	341	377	309	137	501	400	384	128	350	2927	5782
Par	Women's	5	5	4	3	4	5	4	4	3	37	4	5	4	3	5	5	5	3	4	38	75
SI	Women's	7	3	11	15	5	1	9	13	17		4	8	6	18	2	10	12	16	14

West Course at Five Farms
Tee	Rating/Slope	1	2	3	4	5	6	7	8	9	Out	10	11	12	13	14	15	16	17	18	In	Total
Blue	73.0/133	520	191	265	549	424	402	370	182	414	3317	432	367	496	220	375	432	145	418	593	3478	6795
White	70.6/127	511	171	248	481	398	365	370	149	386	3079	410	341	458	199	334	390	130	362	567	3191	6270
Gold	68.1/124	456	145	248	446	383	365	337	130	310	2820	410	313	420	175	334	330	120	335	528	2965	5785
Par	Men's	5	3	4	5	4	4	4	3	4	36	4	4	5	3	4	4	3	4	5	36	72
SI	Men's	7	15	17	1	3	11	9	13	5		8	14	2	12	16	4	18	10	6
Red	72.9/130	456	145	200	446	383	335	337	130	310	2742	380	313	420	155	300	330	110	335	455	2798	5540
Green	67.4/120	252	114	185	371	323	305	311	103	258	2222	300	277	320	155	259	263	110	300	455	2439	4661
Par	Women's	5	3	4	5	4	4	4	3	5	36	4	4	5	3	4	4	3	4	5	36	72
SI	Women's	5	17	15	1	3	9	7	13	11		8	10	2	14	16	4	18	12	6

== Golf tournaments ==
Year	Tournament	Course	Winner	Score	To par
1899	U.S. Open	Roland Park	(Scotland) Willie Smith	315	+27
1928	PGA Championship	East Course at Five Farms	(United States) Leo Diegel	6 & 5	
1932	U.S. Amateur	East Course at Five Farms	(Canada) Ross Somerville	2 & 1	
1965	Walker Cup	East Course at Five Farms	Tie: U.S. vs Great Britain & Ireland	12 & 12	
1988	U.S. Women's Open	East Course at Five Farms	(Sweden) Liselotte Neumann	277	-7
2007	Senior Players Championship	East Course at Five Farms	(United States) Loren Roberts	267	−13
2008	Senior Players Championship	East Course at Five Farms	(United States) D.A. Weibring	271	−9
2009	Senior Players Championship	East Course at Five Farms	(United States) Jay Haas	267	−13
2017	Big Ten Men's Golf Championship	East Course at Five Farms	(United States) Illinois	829	−11
2018	Big Ten Men's Golf Championship	East Course at Five Farms	(United States) Illinois	836	−4
2026	U.S. Senior Amateur	East Course at Five Farms			
2031	U.S. Women's Amateur	East Course at Five Farms			

== In popular culture ==
- The Netflix show, House of Cards used the Roland Park clubhouse for filming.
