= List of PGA Championship champions =

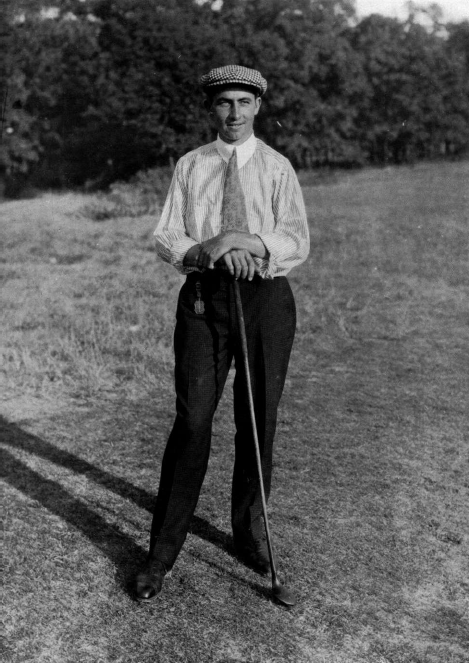
Walter Hagen, five-time PGA Championship champion (1921, 1924, 1925, 1926, and 1927). He holds the record for most wins in match play competition.

The PGA Championship is an annual golf competition formerly held in mid-August until 2019, when it moved to mid-May. It was established in 1916 and is one of the four major championships played each year which include the Masters, the U.S. Open, and the Open Championship (British Open). In addition, this championship is conducted by the Professional Golfers' Association of America (PGA). Due to World War I and II, the competition was not held from 1917 to 1918 and in 1943, respectively.

The reigning champion of the competition is automatically invited to play in the other three majors for the next five years, and is exempt from qualifying for the PGA Championship for life. The champion also receives membership on the PGA Tour for the following five years and invitations to The Players Championship for five years. The prize of the tournament is the Wanamaker Trophy, which the champion keeps until the following year's competition. The PGA Championship was originally a match play event; however, in 1958 it was changed to a stroke play event.

Walter Hagen (match play) and Jack Nicklaus (stroke play) hold the record for the most victories; both men have won the competition five times. Hagen holds the record for most consecutive wins in match play with four (1924–27), and Tiger Woods holds the record for most consecutive wins in stroke play with two, which he did twice (1999–2000, 2006–07). Phil Mickelson is the oldest winner of the PGA Championship; he was 50 years, 11 months old when he won in 2021. The youngest winner of the PGA Championship is Gene Sarazen, who was 20 years, 174 days old when he won in 1922. David Toms holds the record for the lowest score over 72 holes, which is 265.

Jason Day holds the record for most strokes under par for 72 holes, 20, when he won the 2015 PGA Championship. This is the record under par score in all major championships. The PGA Championship has had three wire-to-wire champions: Bobby Nichols in 1964, Raymond Floyd in 1982, and Hal Sutton in 1983. Four others have led wire-to-wire if ties after a round are counted: Floyd in 1969, Nick Price in 1994, Woods in 2000 and Mickelson in 2005.

== Champions ==
=== Match play ===
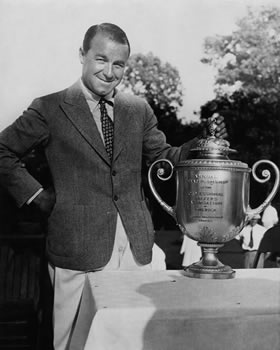
Gene Sarazen, three-time PGA Championship champion (1922, 1923, and 1933). He is the youngest player to ever win the tournament.

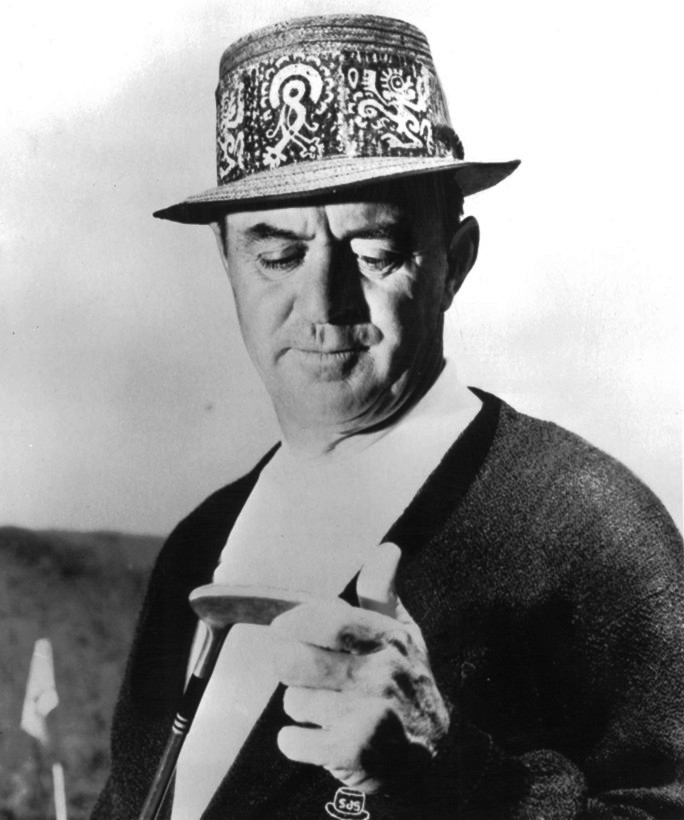
Sam Snead, three-time PGA Championship champion (1942, 1949, and 1951).

PGA Championship champions in match play format
Year	Country	Champion	Margin	Runner-up	Course	Location
1916	England	Jim Barnes	1 up	Jock Hutchison	Siwanoy Country Club	Bronxville, New York
1917	—	None^{[a]}	—	None	—	—
1918	—	None	—	None	—	—
1919	England	Jim Barnes	6 & 5	Fred McLeod	Engineers Country Club	Roslyn Harbor, New York
1920	United States	Jock Hutchison	1 up	James Douglas Edgar	Flossmoor Country Club	Flossmoor, Illinois
1921	United States	Walter Hagen	3 & 2	Jim Barnes	Inwood Country Club	Inwood, New York
1922	United States	Gene Sarazen	4 & 3	Emmet French	Oakmont Country Club	Oakmont, Pennsylvania
1923	United States	Gene Sarazen	38 holes	Walter Hagen	Pelham Country Club	Pelham Manor, New York
1924	United States	Walter Hagen	2 up	Jim Barnes	French Lick Springs Resort	French Lick, Indiana
1925	United States	Walter Hagen	6 & 5	Bill Mehlhorn	Olympia Fields Country Club	Olympia Fields, Illinois
1926	United States	Walter Hagen	5 & 3	Leo Diegel	Salisbury Country Club	East Meadow, New York
1927	United States	Walter Hagen	1 up	Joe Turnesa	Cedar Crest GC	Dallas, Texas
1928	United States	Leo Diegel	6 & 5	Al Espinosa	Baltimore Country Club	Baltimore, Maryland
1929	United States	Leo Diegel	6 & 4	Johnny Farrell	Hillcrest Country Club	Los Angeles, California
1930	United States	Tommy Armour	1 up	Gene Sarazen	Fresh Meadow Country Club	Great Neck, New York
1931	United States	Tom Creavy	2 & 1	Denny Shute	Wannamoisett Country Club	Rumford, Rhode Island
1932	United States	Olin Dutra	4 & 3	Frank Walsh	Keller Golf Course	Maplewood, Minnesota
1933	United States	Gene Sarazen	5 & 4	Willie Goggin	Blue Mound Golf & Country Club	Wauwatosa, Wisconsin
1934	United States	Paul Runyan	38 holes	Craig Wood	The Park Country Club	Williamsville, New York
1935	United States	Johnny Revolta	5 & 4	Tommy Armour	Twin Hills Golf & Country Club	Oklahoma City, Oklahoma
1936	United States	Denny Shute	3 & 2	Jimmy Thomson	Pinehurst Resort	Pinehurst, North Carolina
1937	United States	Denny Shute	37 holes	Harold McSpaden	Pittsburgh Field Club	Fox Chapel, Pennsylvania
1938	United States	Paul Runyan	8 & 7	Sam Snead	The Shawnee Inn & Golf Resort	Smithfield Township, Pennsylvania
1939	United States	Henry Picard	37 holes	Byron Nelson	Pomonok Country Club	Flushing, New York
1940	United States	Byron Nelson	1 up	Sam Snead	Hershey Country Club	Hershey, Pennsylvania
1941	United States	Vic Ghezzi	38 holes	Byron Nelson	Cherry Hills Country Club	Cherry Hills Village, Colorado
1942	United States	Sam Snead	2 & 1	Jim Turnesa	Seaview Country Club	Atlantic City, New Jersey
1943	—	None^{[b]}	—	None	—	—
1944	United States	Bob Hamilton	1 up	Byron Nelson	Manito Golf and Country Club	Spokane, Washington
1945	United States	Byron Nelson	1 up	Sam Byrd	Moraine Country Club	Dayton, Ohio
1946	United States	Ben Hogan	6 & 4	Ed Oliver	Portland Golf Club	Portland, Oregon
1947	Australia	Jim Ferrier	2 & 1	Chick Harbert	Plum Hollow Country Club	Southfield, Michigan
1948	United States	Ben Hogan	7 & 6	Mike Turnesa	Norwood Hills Country Club	St. Louis, Missouri
1949	United States	Sam Snead	3 & 2	Johnny Palmer	Hermitage Country Club	Richmond, Virginia
1950	United States	Chandler Harper	4 & 3	Henry Williams Jr.	Scioto Country Club	Columbus, Ohio
1951	United States	Sam Snead	7 & 6	Walter Burkemo	Oakmont Country Club	Oakmont, Pennsylvania
1952	United States	Jim Turnesa	1 up	Chick Harbert	Big Spring Country Club	Louisville, Kentucky
1953	United States	Walter Burkemo	2 & 1	Felice Torza	Birmingham Country Club	Birmingham, Michigan
1954	United States	Chick Harbert	4 & 3	Walter Burkemo	Keller Golf Course	Maplewood, Minnesota
1955	United States	Doug Ford	4 & 3	Cary Middlecoff	Meadowbrook Country Club	Detroit, Michigan
1956	United States	Jack Burke Jr.	3 & 2	Ted Kroll	Blue Hill Country Club	Canton, Massachusetts
1957	United States	Lionel Hebert	1 up	Dow Finsterwald	Miami Valley Golf Club	Dayton, Ohio

=== Stroke play ===
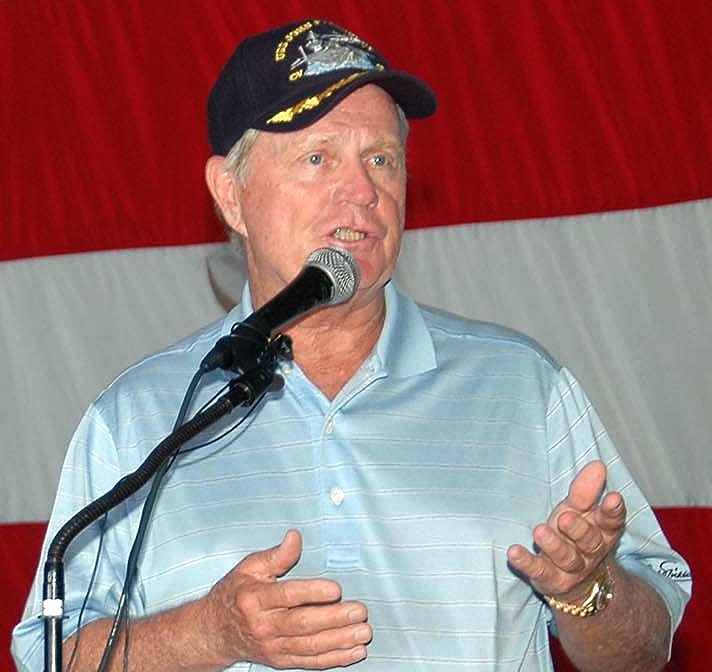
Jack Nicklaus, five-time PGA Championship champion (1963, 1971, 1973, 1975, and 1980). He holds the record for most wins in stroke play competition.

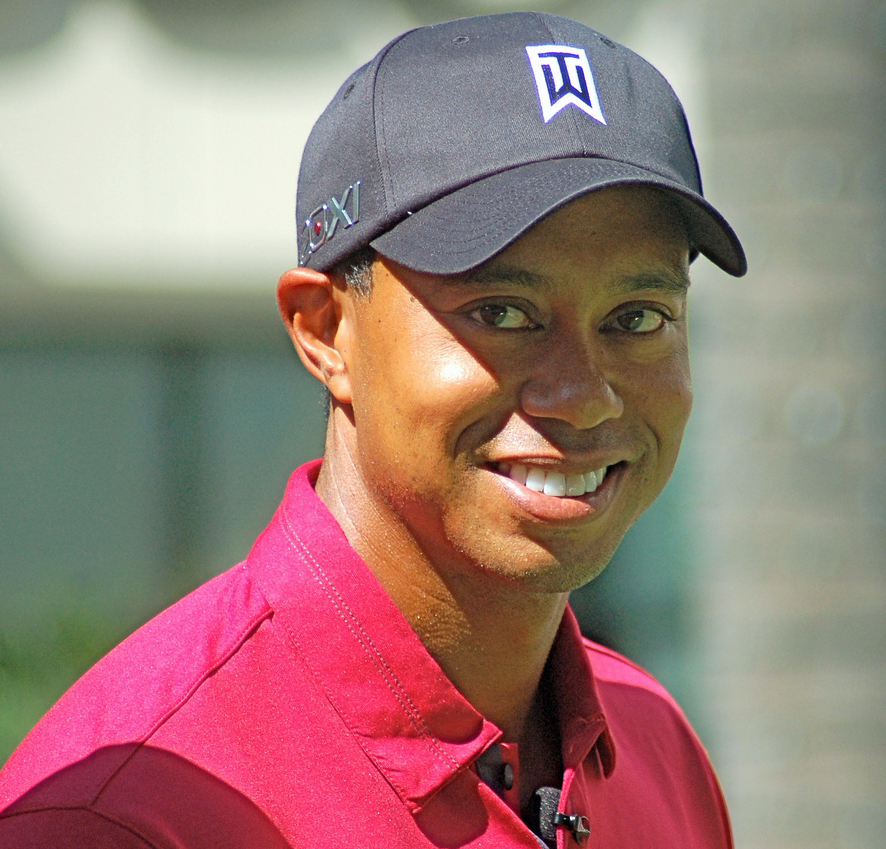
Tiger Woods, four-time PGA Championship champion (1999, 2000, 2006, and 2007). He is one of two golfers to win the PGA Championship back-to-back in stroke play competition, accomplishing this twice. He is one of four champions to win wire-to-wire with his victory in 2000.

Key
†	Tournament won in a playoff

PGA Championship champions in stroke play format
Year	Country	Champion	Course	Location	Total score	To par^{[a]}
1958	United States	Dow Finsterwald	Llanerch Country Club	Havertown, Pennsylvania	276	−4
1959	United States	Bob Rosburg	Minneapolis Golf Club	Minneapolis, Minnesota	277	−3
1960	United States	Jay Hebert	Firestone Country Club	Akron, Ohio	281	+1
1961	United States	Jerry Barber †^{[d]}	Olympia Fields	Olympia Fields, Illinois	277	−3
1962	South Africa	Gary Player	Aronimink Golf Club	Newtown Square, Pennsylvania	278	−2
1963	United States	Jack Nicklaus	Dallas Athletic Club, Blue Course	Dallas, Texas	279	−5
1964	United States	Bobby Nichols	Columbus Country Club	Columbus, Ohio	271	−9
1965	United States	Dave Marr	Laurel Valley Golf Club	Ligonier, Pennsylvania	280	−4
1966	United States	Al Geiberger	Firestone Country Club, South Course	Akron, Ohio	280	E
1967	United States	Don January †^{[e]}	Columbine Country Club	Columbine Valley, Colorado	281	−7
1968	United States	Julius Boros	Pecan Valley Golf Club	San Antonio, Texas	281	+1
1969	United States	Raymond Floyd	NCR Country Club, South Course	Dayton, Ohio	276	−8
1970	United States	Dave Stockton	Southern Hills	Tulsa, Oklahoma	279	−1
1971	United States	Jack Nicklaus	PGA National	Palm Beach Gardens, Florida	281	−7
1972	South Africa	Gary Player	Oakland Hills, South Course	Bloomfield Hills, Michigan	281	+1
1973	United States	Jack Nicklaus	Canterbury Golf Club	Beachwood, Ohio	277	−7
1974	United States	Lee Trevino	Tanglewood Park, Championship Course	Clemmons, North Carolina	276	−4
1975	United States	Jack Nicklaus	Firestone Country Club, South Course	Akron, Ohio	276	−4
1976	United States	Dave Stockton	Congressional Country Club, Blue Course	Bethesda, Maryland	281	+1
1977	United States	Lanny Wadkins †^{[f]}	Pebble Beach	Pebble Beach, California	282	−6
1978	United States	John Mahaffey †^{[g]}	Oakmont Country Club	Oakmont, Pennsylvania	276	−8
1979	Australia	David Graham †^{[h]}	Oakland Hills, South Course	Bloomfield Hills, Michigan	272	−8
1980	United States	Jack Nicklaus	Oak Hill, East Course	Rochester, New York	274	−6
1981	United States	Larry Nelson	Atlanta Athletic Club, Highlands Course	Duluth, Georgia	273	−7
1982	United States	Raymond Floyd	Southern Hills	Tulsa, Oklahoma	272	−8
1983	United States	Hal Sutton	Riviera Country Club	Pacific Palisades, California	274	−10
1984	United States	Lee Trevino	Shoal Creek	Birmingham, Alabama	273	−15
1985	United States	Hubert Green	Cherry Hill	Cherry Hills Village, Colorado	278	−6
1986	United States	Bob Tway	Inverness Club	Toledo, Ohio	276	−8
1987	United States	Larry Nelson †^{[i]}	PGA National	Palm Beach Gardens, Florida	287	−1
1988	United States	Jeff Sluman	Oak Tree	Edmond, Oklahoma	272	−12
1989	United States	Payne Stewart	Kemper Lakes	Long Grove, Illinois	276	−12
1990	Australia	Wayne Grady	Shoal Creek	Birmingham, Alabama	282	−6
1991	United States	John Daly	Crooked Stick	Carmel, Indiana	276	−12
1992	Zimbabwe	Nick Price	Bellerive Country Club	St. Louis, Missouri	278	−6
1993	United States	Paul Azinger †^{[j]}	Inverness Club	Toledo, Ohio	272	−12
1994	Zimbabwe	Nick Price	Southern Hills	Tulsa, Oklahoma	269	−11
1995	Australia	Steve Elkington †^{[k]}	Riviera Country Club	Pacific Palisades, California	267	−17
1996	United States	Mark Brooks †^{[l]}	Valhalla Golf Club	Louisville, Kentucky	277	−11
1997	United States	Davis Love III	Winged Foot, West Course	Mamaroneck, New York	269	−11
1998	Fiji	Vijay Singh	Sahalee Country Club	Sammamish, Washington	271	−9
1999	United States	Tiger Woods	Medinah Country Club, Course No. 3	Medinah, Illinois	277	−11
2000	United States	Tiger Woods †^{[m]}	Valhalla Golf Club	Louisville, Kentucky	270	−18
2001	United States	David Toms	Atlanta Athletic Club, Highlands Course	Duluth, Georgia	265	−15
2002	United States	Rich Beem	Hazeltine National	Chaska, Minnesota	278	−10
2003	United States	Shaun Micheel	Oak Hill, East Course	Rochester, New York	276	−4
2004	Fiji	Vijay Singh †^{[n]}	Whistling Straits, Straits Course	Kohler, Wisconsin	280	−8
2005	United States	Phil Mickelson	Baltusrol Golf Club, Lower Course	Springfield, New Jersey	276	−4
2006	United States	Tiger Woods	Medinah Country Club, Course No. 3	Medinah, Illinois	270	−18
2007	United States	Tiger Woods	Southern Hills	Tulsa, Oklahoma	272	−8
2008	Republic of Ireland	Pádraig Harrington	Oakland Hills, South Course	Bloomfield Hills, Michigan	277	−3
2009	South Korea	Yang Yong-eun	Hazeltine National	Chaska, Minnesota	280	−8
2010	Germany	Martin Kaymer †^{[o]}	Whistling Straits, Straits Course	Kohler, Wisconsin	277	−11
2011	United States	Keegan Bradley †^{[p]}	Atlanta Athletic Club, Highlands Course	Duluth, Georgia	272	−8
2012	Northern Ireland	Rory McIlroy	Kiawah Island Golf Resort, The Ocean Course	Kiawah Island, South Carolina	275	−13
2013	United States	Jason Dufner	Oak Hill, East Course	Rochester, New York	270	−10
2014	Northern Ireland	Rory McIlroy	Valhalla Golf Club	Louisville, Kentucky	268	−16
2015	Australia	Jason Day	Whistling Straits, Straits Course	Kohler, Wisconsin	268	−20
2016	United States	Jimmy Walker	Baltusrol Golf Club, Lower Course	Springfield, New Jersey	266	−14
2017	United States	Justin Thomas	Quail Hollow Club	Charlotte, North Carolina	276	−8
2018	United States	Brooks Koepka	Bellerive Country Club	Town and Country, Missouri	264	−16
2019	United States	Brooks Koepka	Bethpage Black Course	Farmingdale, New York	272	−8
2020	United States	Collin Morikawa	TPC Harding Park	San Francisco, California	267	−13
2021	United States	Phil Mickelson	Kiawah Island Golf Resort, The Ocean Course	Kiawah Island, South Carolina	282	−6
2022	United States	Justin Thomas †^{[q]}	Southern Hills	Tulsa, Oklahoma	275	−5
2023	United States	Brooks Koepka	Oak Hill, East Course	Rochester, New York	271	−9
2024	United States	Xander Schauffele	Valhalla Golf Club	Louisville, Kentucky	263	−21
2025	United States	Scottie Scheffler	Quail Hollow Club	Charlotte, North Carolina	273	−11
2026	England	Aaron Rai	Aronimink Golf Club	Newtown Square, Pennsylvania	271	−9

=== Multiple champions ===
Multiple PGA Championship champions
Golfer	Total	Years
Walter Hagen (USA)	5	1921, 1924, 1925, 1926, 1927
Jack Nicklaus (USA)	5	1963, 1971, 1973, 1975, 1980
Tiger Woods (USA)	4	1999, 2000, 2006, 2007
Gene Sarazen (USA)	3	1922, 1923, 1933
Sam Snead (USA)	3	1942, 1949, 1951
Brooks Koepka (USA)	3	2018, 2019, 2023
Jim Barnes (England)	2	1916, 1919
Leo Diegel (USA)	2	1928, 1929
Denny Shute (USA)	2	1936, 1937
Paul Runyan (USA)	2	1934, 1938
Byron Nelson (USA)	2	1940, 1945
Ben Hogan (USA)	2	1946, 1948
Gary Player (RSA)	2	1962, 1972
Dave Stockton (USA)	2	1970, 1976
Raymond Floyd (USA)	2	1969, 1982
Lee Trevino (USA)	2	1974, 1984
Larry Nelson (USA)	2	1981, 1987
Nick Price (ZWE)	2	1992, 1994
Vijay Singh (FJI)	2	1998, 2004
Phil Mickelson (USA)	2	2005, 2021
Rory McIlroy (NIR)	2	2012, 2014
Justin Thomas (USA)	2	2017, 2022

=== By nationality ===
PGA Championship champions by nationality
Nationality	Wins	Winners
United States	89	61
Australia	5	5
England	3	2
South Africa	2	1
Zimbabwe	2	1
Fiji	2	1
Northern Ireland	2	1
Republic of Ireland	1	1
South Korea	1	1
Germany	1	1

== Notes ==
- ^{a} The PGA Championship was not held from 1917 to 1918 because of World War I.
- ^{b} The 1943 PGA Championship was not held because of World War II.
- ^{c} Par is a predetermined number of strokes that a golfer should require to complete a hole, a round (the sum of the total pars of the played holes), or a tournament (the sum of the total pars of each round). E stands for even, which means the tournament was completed in the predetermined number of strokes.
- ^{d} Jerry Barber won in a playoff against Don January.
- ^{e} Don January won in a playoff against Don Massengale.
- ^{f} Lanny Wadkins won in a playoff against Gene Littler.
- ^{g} John Mahaffey won in a playoff against Tom Watson and Jerry Pate.
- ^{h} David Graham won in a playoff against Ben Crenshaw.
- ^{i} Larry Nelson won in a playoff against Lanny Wadkins.
- ^{j} Paul Azinger won in a playoff against Greg Norman.
- ^{k} Steve Elkington won in a playoff against Colin Montgomerie.
- ^{l} Mark Brooks won in a playoff against Kenny Perry.
- ^{m} Tiger Woods won in a playoff against Bob May.
- ^{n} Vijay Singh won in a playoff against Chris DiMarco and Justin Leonard.
- ^{o} Martin Kaymer won in a playoff against Bubba Watson.
- ^{p} Keegan Bradley won in a playoff against Jason Dufner.
- ^{q} Justin Thomas won in a playoff against Will Zalatoris.
