= Joe Sylvester =

American golfer (1893–1976)

Personal information
- Full name: Joseph Francis Sylvester
- Nationality: United States
- Born: February 2, 1893 New York City, New York
- Died: October 28, 1976 (aged 83) New York

Career
- Sport: Golf
- Turned professional: c. 1910
- Professional wins: 1

Best results in major championships
- Masters Tournament: DNP
- PGA Championship: T9: 1920
- U.S. Open: T24: 1923
- The Open Championship: DNP

Joseph Francis Sylvester (February 2, 1893 – October 28, 1976) was an American professional golfer and club maker who played in the early-to-mid 20th century. His best performances in major golf championships were a T24 finish in the 1923 U.S. Open and a T9 showing in the 1920 PGA Championship.

In September 1910, the 17-year-old former caddie won the Greater New York Championship at the Van Cortlandt Park links, beating William Wallace.

== Early life ==
Sylvester was born on February 2, 1893, in New York City, New York, the son of Italian immigrants Alfonso and Philomena Sylvester. His father worked at a factory that made pianos. Not unlike the majority of golfers from his generation, Sylvester first learned to play golf after working as a caddie. He was also a fine maker of golf clubs.

== Golf career ==
At age 17, Sylvester won the Greater New York Championship at the Van Cortlandt Park links, defeating William Wallace. Sylvester played in a number of U.S. Open tournaments. His results were as follows: T45 in 1913; 50th in 1915; T44 in 1921; and T24 in 1923. Sylvester was hired as the professional at the Glens Falls Country Club in Queensbury, New York, in 1914 but spent only one season there. He then took a post as club professional at St. Albans Country Club (now defunct) in Queens, New York, from 1915 to 1938. In 1939, Sylvester was the head professional at the Pomonok Country Club on Long Island where that year's PGA Championship was contested. As the home professional, he was exempt from qualifying. For reasons unknown, however, the official records for the tournament do not reflect Sylvester as being in the starting field.

Sylvester's golf career was put on hold when he was called up for duty to serve during World War I. It was reported in the Brooklyn Daily Eagle on November 29, 1918, that Sylvester was wounded when he was shot in his calf while fighting in France. The report went on to say that Sylvester did not think the wound would affect his professional career and that he had done more teaching than playing since his 1913 appearance at Brookline.

In 1936, he was paired with Babe Ruth in a pro-am best-ball tournament at the Rockville Country Club on Long Island. Sylvester's game suffered as he was "distracted" by the large crowds that followed Ruth.

=== 1919 PGA Championship ===
In the 1919 PGA Championship, contested from September 16–20 at the Herbert Strong-designed Engineers Country Club in Roslyn Harbor, New York, Sylvester made it into the round of 32. He then lost his next match to Otto Hackbarth by the margin of 5 and 4. His final placement was a tie for 17th. He won $50 in prize money.

=== 1920 PGA Championship ===
Sylvester had his best major championship finish in the 1920 PGA Championship which was played from August 17–21 at the Flossmoor Country Club outside Flossmoor, Illinois, a suburb south of Chicago. The field of 32 golfers qualified by sectional tournaments. They then competed in 36-hole match play rounds in a single-elimination tournament. Sylvester opened up play with a first round victory over Tom Boyd, winning 4 and 3. In the next round, however, he lost convincingly to James Douglas Edgar by the score of 11 and 9. Sylvester's final position in the tournament was a tie for ninth place, winning $60.

=== 1921 PGA Championship ===
In the 1921 PGA Championship, held September 27 to October 1 at the Inwood Country Club in Inwood, New York, Sylvester again made it into the round of 32. He lost in the first round to Emmett French 8 and 7, finishing in a tie for 17th place. He won $50 in prize money.

== Death and legacy ==
Sylvester died on October 28, 1976, presumably in New York state. Sylvester was a frequent competitor in both the U.S. Open and the PGA Championship. He was granted a patent for a golf club design in 1937.

== Results in major championships ==
Tournament	1913	1914	1915	1916	1917	1918	1919	1920	1921	1922	1923
U.S. Open	T45	?	50	?	NT	NT	?	?	T44	?	T24
PGA Championship	NYF	NYF	NYF	DNP	NT	NT	R32	R16	R32	DNP	DNP

Note: Sylvester never played in the Masters Tournament or The Open Championship.

NYF = Tournament not yet founded
NT = No tournament
DNP = Did not play
? = Unknown
R64, R32, R16, QF, SF = Round in which player lost in PGA Championship match play
"T" indicates a tie for a place
Yellow background for top-10.
