= 1921 PGA Championship =

Coordinates: 40.621°N 73.756°W

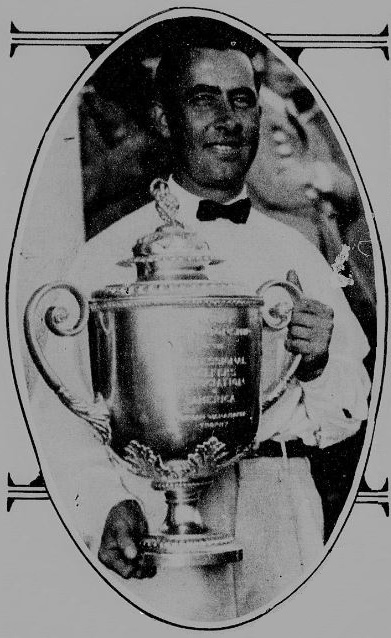
- Champion Walter Hagen and Wanamaker Trophy

Tournament information
- Dates: September 27 – October 1
- Location: Inwood, New York
- Course: Inwood Country Club
- Organized by: PGA of America
- Tour: PGA Tour
- Format: Match play - 5 rounds

Statistics
- Field: 32 players
- Prize fund: $2,580
- Winner's share: $500

Champion
- (United States) Walter Hagen
- def. Jim Barnes, 3 and 2

Location in the United States
Location in New York
Location near New York City

The 1921 PGA Championship was the fourth PGA Championship, held September 27 to October 1 on Long Island at Inwood Country Club in Inwood, New York. The match play field of 32 consisted of the defending champion and the top qualifiers from the 1921 U.S. Open. The competition was five rounds of 36-hole matches in a single-elimination tournament.

Walter Hagen defeated Jim Barnes, 3 and 2, in the final, for the third of his eleven major titles. Barnes won the first two PGA titles in 1916 and 1919. Defending champion Jock Hutchison lost in the second round to Gene Sarazen, 8 and 7. Sarazen won consecutive titles in 1922 and 1923. After not entering in 1922 and losing the final in 1923, Hagen won four consecutive PGA Championships, starting in 1924.

== Bracket 1 ==
Round 1 September 27
Walter Hagen	6&4
Jack Forrester
Tom Boyd	Def.
Eddie Towns
Johnny Golden	5&3
Robert Barnett
Laurie Ayton, Snr	7&6
T. J. Rajoppi

Round 2 September 28
Walter Hagen	6&5
Tom Boyd
Johnny Golden	1 up
Laurie Ayton, Snr

Quarter-finals; September 29
Walter Hagen	8&7
Johnny Golden

== Bracket 2 ==
Round 1 September 27
Jim Barnes	3&2
Clarence Hackney
Bobby Cruickshank	4&3
Charlie Thom
Fred McLeod	37th
Fred Canausa
Jack Gordon	8&7
William Leach

Round 2 September 28
Jim Barnes	8&7
Bobby Cruickshank
Fred McLeod	4&2
Jack Gordon

Quarter-finals; September 29
Jim Barnes	11&9
Fred McLeod

== Bracket 3 ==
Round 1 September 27
Cyril Walker	37th
Emil Loeffler
Charles Mothersole	40th
Johnny Farrell
Gene Sarazen	4&3
Harry Hampton
Jock Hutchison	39th
Pat O'Hara

Round 2 September 28
Cyril Walker	4&2
Charles Mothersole
Gene Sarazen	8&7
Jock Hutchison

Quarter-finals; September 29
Cyril Walker	5&4
Gene Sarazen

== Bracket 4 ==
Round 1 September 27
Emmet French	8&7
Joe Sylvester
Charles Clarke	1 up
Peter O'Hara
George McLean	2&1
Tom Kerrigan
James West	37th
Jack Pirie

Round 2 September 28
Emmet French	8&7
Charles Clarke
George McLean	8&7
James West

Quarter-finals; September 29
Emmet French	5&3
George McLean

== Final four ==
Semi-finals; September 30
Walter Hagen	5&4
Cyril Walker
Jim Barnes	5&4
Emmet French

Finals; October 1
Walter Hagen	3&2
Jim Barnes
