= Willie Ogg =

Scottish-American golfer

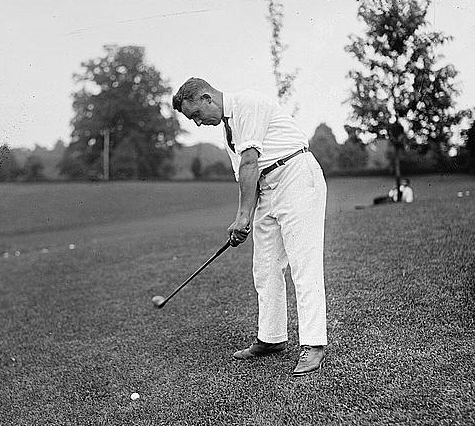
- Ogg hitting a fairway wood shot, c. 1920

Personal information
- Full name: William R. Ogg, Jr.
- Nationality: Scotland; United States
- Born: 10 May 1888 Carnoustie, Scotland
- Died: 25 December 1959 (aged 71) Tampa, Florida, U.S.
- Height: 5 ft 10 in (1.78 m)
- Weight: 184 lb (83 kg; 13.1 st)

Career
- Sport: Golf
- Turned professional: c. 1906
- Former tour: PGA Tour
- Professional wins: 4

Number of wins by tour
- PGA Tour: 3
- Other: 1

Best results in major championships
- Masters Tournament: DNP
- PGA Championship: T9: 1923
- U.S. Open: T15: 1924
- The Open Championship: DNP

William Robertson Ogg, Jr. (10 May 1888 – 25 December 1959) was a Scottish-American professional golfer, club maker, and golf course architect. He won the 1921 Shawnee Open, 1923 Maine Open, 1924 New England PGA Championship, and the 1924 Massachusetts Open. He finished tied for 9th place in the 1923 PGA Championship, a career-best result in major championships.

Ogg was one of the founding members of the PGA of America, serving as vice president. He was an excellent golf instructor and was the author of the book "Golf as I Know it", published posthumously in 1961.

He was the first golf club maker to build and patent the forerunner to the modern perimeter-weighted or cavity back iron. Ogg also patented a design for a golf glove.

== Early life ==
Ogg was born on 10 May 1888, in Carnoustie, Scotland, the son of William Robertson Ogg and Margaret Bissett. He emigrated from Scotland to the U.S. to pursue a career as a professional golfer.

== Golf career ==
Ogg began his career in golf as a club maker in Scotland where he worked for the St. Andrews Golf Company. After his arrival in the U.S. he eventually was elected the vice president of the PGA of America. Ogg was instrumental in arranging for the first Ryder Cup matches to be held at his home course of Worcester Country Club in 1927. He laid out the Green Hill Golf Club in Worcester, Massachusetts, and the course opened up for play on 1 April 1929. Ogg is also responsible for the design of the Country Club of Wilbraham in Wilbraham, Massachusetts. After leaving Worcester, he accepted a position as professional and course superintendent at Albany Country Club in Voorheesville, New York, where in 1954 he made changes to improve the quality of the golf course by planting thousands of trees and installing a modern watering system.

In 1933, Ogg – who at the time was serving as an advisory staff member for Wilson Staff – created a patented design for distributing weight away from the heel of the clubhead, moving it towards the "sweet spot" of the blade. This design feature was used in the Wilson "Ogg-mented" irons, the forerunner of perimeter-weighted or cavity back irons. While working for Wilson Staff, he also enhanced their line of woods in 1930 by improving their shafts; in doing so he obtained better balance between clubhead and shaft.

=== 1922 PGA Championship ===
The 1922 PGA Championship was the fifth PGA Championship, held 14–18 August at Oakmont Country Club in Oakmont, Pennsylvania, a suburb northeast of Pittsburgh. The match play field of 64 competitors qualified by sectional tournaments. This was the first PGA Championship with a field of 64 in the bracket, the previous four had fields of 32 players. In the Friday final, Gene Sarazen defeated Emmet French, 4 and 3. Ogg began the tournament with a 2 up victory over Clarence Hackney in his first round match. In the second round, he battled Sarazen in a closely contested match before finally losing 2 and 1. Ogg's final place in the event was a tie for 17th.

=== 1923 PGA Championship ===
In the 1923 PGA Championship, a single-elimination tournament contested from 24–29 September at the Pelham Country Club in Pelham Manor, New York, Ogg improved on his performance from 1922 in the same event. He was at the peak of his playing powers in 1923 and in a first round match was in fine form when he beat Fred Baroni 2 and 1. He wasn't done, as evidenced by a convincing second round win by the score of 12 and 11 over Carl Anderson. Having battled his way into the round of 16, he met George McLean in the third round. Brimming with confidence, Ogg didn't acquiesce easily; it took McLean 38 holes, the final two being playoff holes to break a tie, to finally win 1 up. Ogg's excellent play in this tournament would be his best performance in a major championship during his career, a T9 result.

=== 1924 PGA Championship ===
Ogg didn't fare so well in the 1924 PGA Championship held 15–20 September at the French Lick Springs Golf Club in French Lick, Indiana. Walter Hagen, the 1921 champion, defeated Jim Barnes in the finals 2 up. Most of the competitors in the starting field of 32 first had to qualify in a 36-hole stroke play qualifier on Monday, 15 September. Ogg succeeded in qualifying, however he lost to Bobby Cruickshank 7 and 5 in the first round.

=== Memorable matches ===
On 26 April 1919, Ogg was paired with the young Bobby Jones – who had taken lessons from Ogg – in an alternate shot match held at Druid Hills Golf Club against James Douglas Edgar and Perry Adair. At the time, Ogg was posted as head professional at East Lake Golf Club in Atlanta where he succeeded Stewart Maiden who accepted a position at St. Louis Country Club. Jones and Ogg, who had played golf together before, knew each other's game well whereas the pairing of Edgar and Adair did not. Ogg and Jones, who used their previous golf playing partnership to their advantage, were able to prevail in the match by the score of 1 up when Jones holed a putt on the final hole. In June 1919, Ogg partnered with Edgar in a best ball match and beat 17-year-old Jones who on that occasion was paired with Adair.

== Death and legacy ==
Ogg died on Christmas Day 1959 in Tampa, Florida. At the time of his death, Ogg was engaged in design work on a new course in Tampa. He is remembered as a touring golf professional with a number of tournament wins and good finishes in golf major championships. He was the first golf club maker to build and patent the forerunner to the modern perimeter-weighted or cavity back iron.

His lectures on golf fundamentals at the PGA Assistants' School in Clearwater, Florida, were described by Herb Graffis in 1960 as "classics".

== Professional wins (4) ==
=== PGA Tour wins (3) ===
- 1921 Shawnee Open
- 1923 Maine Open
- 1924 Massachusetts Open

=== Other wins (1) ===
- 1924 New England PGA Championship

== Results in major championships ==
Tournament	1919	1920	1921	1922	1923	1924	1925	1926	1927	1928	1929
U.S. Open	T41			T19	T18	T15		CUT	CUT	CUT	WD
PGA Championship				R32	R16	R32	R32			R32	

Note: Ogg never played in the Masters Tournament or The Open Championship.

Top 10
Did not play

CUT = missed the half-way cut
WD = withdrew
"T" = tied for a place
R32, R16, QF, SF = round in which player lost in PGA Championship match play
