= Joe Roseman =

American golf professional (1888–1944)

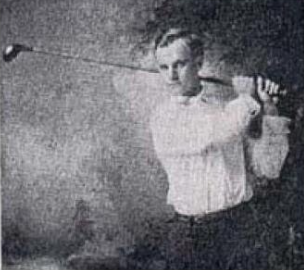
- Roseman, c. 1912

Personal information
- Full name: Joseph Aloysius Roseman, Sr.
- Nationality: United States
- Born: June 15, 1888 Philadelphia, Pennsylvania, U.S.
- Died: February 29, 1944 (aged 55) Glenview, Illinois, U.S.
- Children: 4

Career
- Sport: Golf
- Turned professional: 1903

Best results in major championships
- Masters Tournament: DNP
- PGA Championship: T17: 1919, 1920
- U.S. Open: DNP
- The Open Championship: DNP

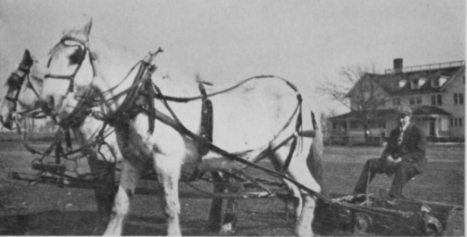
Roseman riding a Coldwell model horse-drawn mower at Des Moines Golf and Country Club, c. 1910

Joseph Aloysius Roseman, Sr. (June 15, 1888 – February 29, 1944) was an American professional golfer, golf course architect, and inventor of golf course mowing equipment. He designed at least 50 golf courses and made alterations on over 100 more. Roseman had two starts in golf majors – the 1919 and the 1920 PGA Championship.

In 1922 he became the first president of the Illinois PGA. Roseman died in 1944 in Glenview, Illinois.

== Early life ==
Roseman was born in Philadelphia, Pennsylvania, on June 15, 1888. He grew up in the East Falls section of the city and began his career in golf as a caddie at the Philadelphia Country Club. He turned pro at the young age of just 15.

== Golf career ==
One of his first jobs was at The Country Club as an assistant under Jack Hagen and he also worked at a course in Lake Placid, New York. In 1906 he moved to Des Moines, Iowa, where he was engaged as the professional and keeper of the greens at the Des Moines Golf and Country Club where he remained until 1916. He was a natural tinkerer and inventor. One of his first innovative ideas was a hitch for horses that allowed them to pull three gang mowers as a unit. His design was patented in the U.S., England, and France. Later he adapted a Ford Model T to serve as a tractor to pull the mowers.

=== Golf course architecture ===
He worked at a number of other locations, being engaged in Racine, Wisconsin, where he designed the Racine Country Club course. In 1917 he settled in Glenview, Illinois, near Chicago, where he designed courses and served as the first professional and course superintendent at the Westmoreland Country Club in Wilmette, Illinois. He left Westmoreland in 1928 to handle his golf course design business. In total, he is credited with the design of more than 50 golf courses and made alterations on at least 100 courses. He worked with Jack Burke, Sr. in the design of golf clubs and also collaborated with Burke in the operation of an indoor golf school in Des Moines around 1918.

=== Mower manufacturing ===
Roseman was one of the early pioneers in the use of comprehensive underground watering systems for golf courses. He sold this idea and the irrigation pipes along with his tractor mowers. In 1922, Roseman became the first president of the Illinois PGA. In the mid-1920s Roseman curtailed his career as golf professional to concentrate on manufacturing golf course equipment. He opened the Roseman Tractor Mowing Company in Evanston, Illinois, in 1928. Many of Roseman's roller-type mowers are still operational and being used at courses around the country.

=== 1919 PGA Championship ===
In the 1919 PGA Championship, held from September 16–20 at the Engineers Country Club in Roslyn Harbor, New York, Roseman qualified in a sectional tournament for the match play portion of the tournament. In a first round match, he lost to James Douglas Edgar by default. In spite of the loss, Roseman still won $50 in prize money.

=== 1920 PGA Championship ===
In the 1920 PGA Championship, contested from August 17–21 at the Flossmoor Country Club outside Flossmoor, Illinois, a suburb south of Chicago, Roseman met Louis Tellier in a first round match. He was not playing his best golf and was soundly defeated in the match by the score of 10 and 9. Roseman took home $50 in prize money.

== Family ==
Roseman and his wife had three sons – Joe, Jr., Warren, and Lewis – and one daughter, Mrs. James Hoffman.

== Death and legacy ==
Roseman died on February 29, 1944, at his home in Glenview, Illinois. He is remembered as an inventor of golf course mowing equipment in the early 20th century and as an important golf course architect. He is known as the "father of the modern mower".
