= 1922 PGA Championship =

Coordinates: 40.526°N 79.827°W

Tournament information
- Dates: August 14–18, 1922
- Location: Oakmont, Pennsylvania
- Course: Oakmont Country Club
- Organized by: PGA of America
- Tour: PGA Tour
- Format: Match play - 6 rounds

Statistics
- Par: 74
- Length: 6,707 yards (6,133 m)
- Field: 64 players
- Prize fund: $2,580
- Winner's share: $500

Champion
- (United States) Gene Sarazen
- def. Emmet French, 4 and 3

Location in the United States
Location in Pennsylvania

The 1922 PGA Championship was the fifth PGA Championship, held August 14–18 at Oakmont Country Club in Oakmont, Pennsylvania, a suburb northeast of Pittsburgh. The match play field of 64 competitors qualified by sectional tournaments. This was the first PGA Championship with a field of 64 in the bracket; the previous four had fields of 32 players. In the Friday final, Gene Sarazen defeated Emmet French, 4 and 3.

Sarazen, age 20, also won the U.S. Open a month earlier near Chicago. Defending champion Walter Hagen did not enter this year due to exhibition engagements; the two champions met the following year in the finals, won by Sarazen.

This was the first of thirteen major championships at Oakmont; three PGA Championships and ten U.S. Opens through 2025. It has hosted the U.S. Amateur six times and the U.S. Women's Open twice. The PGA Championship returned in 1951 and 1978.

Sarazen was the first of four players in history to win the U.S. Open and the PGA Championship in the same calendar year. He was followed by Ben Hogan in 1948 and Jack Nicklaus in 1980. Through 2012, Tiger Woods is the last to win both, in 2000, part of his Tiger Slam of four consecutive majors.

== Course layout ==
Hole	1	2	3	4	5	6	7	8	9	Out	10	11	12	13	14	15	16	17	18	In	Total
Yards	482	363	428	516	371	172	370	233	462	3,397	461	365	601	164	349	420	226	282	442	3,310	6,707
Par	5	4	4	5	4	3	4	3	5	37	5	4	5	3	4	4	3	4	5	37	74

== Format ==
The match play format at the PGA Championship in 1922 called for 10 rounds (180 holes) in five days. The first two rounds were 18-hole matches, contested in the morning and afternoon of the first day, which reduced the field to sixteen players. The third round, quarterfinals, semifinals, and finals were 36-hole matches played on the final four days, Tuesday through Friday.

- Monday - first two rounds, 18 holes each
- Tuesday - third round, 36 holes each
- Wednesday - quarterfinals - 36 holes
- Thursday - semifinals - 36 holes
- Friday - final - 36 holes

== Bracket 1 ==
Round 1 August 14
Gene Sarazen	3&2
Tom Mahan
Willie Ogg	2 up
Clarence Hackney
Frank Sprogell	3&1
Willie Hunter
Dan Kenny	2 up
Earl Rowley
Jock Hutchison	6&5
L. Goldbeck
Dan Goss	6&5
Nelson Zimmerman
Harry Hampton	3&2
Jack Gordon
Charles Hoffner	3&1
Larry Nabholtz

Round 2 August 14
Gene Sarazen	2&1
Willie Ogg
Frank Sprogell	4&3
Dan Kenny
Jock Hutchison	6&4
Dan Goss
Harry Hampton	3&2
Charles Hoffner

Round 3 August 15
Gene Sarazen	9&7
Frank Sprogell
Jock Hutchison	4&3
Harry Hampton

Quarter-finals; August 16
Gene Sarazen	3&1
Jock Hutchison

== Bracket 2 ==
Round 1 August 14
Emmet French	4&2
George Gordon
Mike Brady	1 up
Gilbert Nicholls
R. S. Miner	Def.
Jim Carberry
Fred Baroni	4&3
John Rowe
Emil Loeffler	4&3
Walter Loeffler
Dave Robertson	3&2
Tom McNamara
Eddie Towns	Def.
Tom Harmon
Matt Duffy	Def.
Laurie Ayton, Snr

Round 2 August 14
Emmet French	3&1
Mike Brady
R. S. Miner	19h
Fred Baroni
Emil Loeffler	4&3
Dave Robertson
Eddie Towns	1 up
Matt Duffy

Round 3 August 15
Emmet French	8&7
R. S. Miner
Emil Loeffler	2&1
Eddie Towns

Quarter-finals; August 16
Emmet French	4&2
Emil Loeffler

== Bracket 3 ==
Round 1 August 14
Bobby Cruickshank	7&6
George Underwood
Al Watrous	1 up
George Sargent
Francis Gallett	6&4
Wilfrid Reid
Fred Brand	Def.
Charles Clarke
Charles Rowe	1 up
William Robinson
Tom Boyd	5&4
John Edmundson
Jack Burgess	4&3
A. J. Chapman
Peter Walsh	2&1
Dave McKay

Round 2 August 14
Bobby Cruickshank	3&2
Al Watrous
Francis Gallett	5&4
Fred Brand
Charles Rowe	3&1
Tom Boyd
Jack Burgess	3&2
Peter Walsh

Round 3 August 15
Bobby Cruickshank	7&6
Francis Gallett
Charles Rowe	6&5
Jack Burgess

Quarter-finals; August 16
Bobby Cruickshank	3&2
Charles Rowe

== Bracket 4 ==
Round 1 August 14
Johnny Golden	4&3
Frank Coltart
Phil Gaudin	3&2
T. K. Manley
Al Ciuci	2 up
Carl Giehler
George Stark	20h
John Rogers
Tom Kerrigan	5&4
Archie Loeffler
Charles Hilgendorf	5&4
George Dernbach
Johnny Farrell	6&5
Jack Campbell
Jim Barnes	2&1
George McLean

Round 2 August 14
Johnny Golden	8&7
Phil Gaudin
Al Ciuci	4&2
George Stark
Tom Kerrigan	5&4
Charles Hilgendorf
Johnny Farrell	1 up
Jim Barnes

Round 3 August 15
Johnny Golden	3&2
Al Ciuci
Tom Kerrigan	4&3
Johnny Farrell

Quarter-finals; August 16
Johnny Golden	4&3
Tom Kerrigan

== Final four ==
Semi-finals; August 17
Gene Sarazen	3&2
Bobby Cruickshank
Emmet French	8&7
Johnny Golden

Finals; August 18
Gene Sarazen	4&3
Emmet French
