= 1919 PGA Championship =

Coordinates: 40.820°N 73.642°W

Tournament information
- Dates: September 16–20, 1919
- Location: Roslyn Harbor, New York
- Course: Engineers Country Club
- Organized by: PGA of America
- Tour: PGA Tour
- Format: Match play - 5 rounds

Statistics
- Par: 71
- Length: 6,262 yards (5,726 m)
- Field: 32 players
- Prize fund: $2,580
- Winner's share: $500

Champion
- (England) Jim Barnes
- def. Fred McLeod, 6 and 5

Location in the United States
Location in New York

The 1919 PGA Championship was the second PGA Championship, which is now considered one of golf's major championships. It was held September 16–20 at the Engineers Country Club in Roslyn Harbor, New York, east of New York City on Long Island in Nassau County.

The PGA Championship was not held in 1917 or 1918 due to World War I. The field of 32 golfers qualified by sectional tournaments. They competed in 36-hole match play rounds in a single-elimination tournament. Defending champion Jim Barnes defeated Fred McLeod, 6 and 5, in the final.

== Bracket 1 ==
Round 1 September 16
Jim Barnes	8&6
Carl Anderson
Otto Hackbarth	5&4
Joe Sylvester
Emmet French	7&6
Clarence Hackney
Tom Kerrigan	3&2
Bill Mehlhorn

Round 2 September 17
Jim Barnes	3&2
Otto Hackbarth
Emmet French	2 up
Tom Kerrigan

Quarter-finals; September 18
Jim Barnes	3&2
Emmet French

== Bracket 2 ==
Round 1 September 16
Fred McLeod	9&7
James Rose
George Gordon	3&2
Dave Wilson
James Douglas Edgar	Def.
Joe Roseman
Harry Hampton	7&6
Jack Hobens

Round 2 September 17
Fred McLeod	2 up
George Gordon
James Douglas Edgar	5&4
Harry Hampton

Quarter-finals; September 18
Fred McLeod	8&6
James Douglas Edgar

== Bracket 3 ==
Round 1 September 16
Bob MacDonald	1 up
Tom Boyd
George Fotheringham	8&6
Eddie Loos
Jock Hutchison	6&5
John Bredemus
Tom McNamara	7&6
Louis Marrucci

Round 2 September 17
Bob MacDonald	2&1
George Fotheringham
Jock Hutchison	8&6
Tom McNamara

Quarter-finals; September 18
Bob MacDonald	3&2
Jock Hutchison

== Bracket 4 ==
Round 1 September 16
George McLean	7&6
Johnny Farrell
Mike Brady	7&6
Louis Tellier
James West	Def.
Willie Kidd
Wilfrid Reid	1 up
Pat Doyle

Round 2 September 17
George McLean	6&5
Mike Brady
James West	2&1
Wilfrid Reid

Quarter-finals; September 18
George McLean	9&7
James West

== Final four ==
Semi-finals; September 19
Jim Barnes	5&4
Bob MacDonald
Fred McLeod	3&2
George McLean

Finals; September 20
Jim Barnes	6&5
Fred McLeod
