= 1919 U.S. Open (golf) =

Coordinates: 42.338°N 71.233°W

Tournament information
- Dates: June 9–12, 1919
- Location: Newton, Massachusetts
- Course: Brae Burn Country Club
- Organized by: USGA
- Format: Stroke play − 72 holes

Statistics
- Par: 72
- Length: 6,435 yards (5,884 m)
- Field: 131, 66 after cut
- Cut: 170 (+28)
- Prize fund: $1,300
- Winner's share: $475

Champion
- (United States) Walter Hagen
- 301 (+17)

Location in the United States
Location in Massachusetts

The 1919 United States Open was the 23rd U.S. Open. The tournament was held at Brae Burn Country Club in Newton, Massachusetts. The event is best remembered as a duel between Mike Brady and Walter Hagen as well as Hagen's showmanship. Brady took the solo second and third round leads but played poorly in the final round, shooting an 80, opening doors for Hagen. Hagen had a 10-foot putt on the final hole to win and solicited Brady, watching from the clubhouse, to observe him "win the U.S. Open." However, he barely missed provoking an 18-hole playoff the following day. The following morning, before the playoff, Hagen's showmanship continued as he dubiously presented himself as still disoriented from a night of partying. Regardless, like the final round, the playoff was a neck-and-neck struggle but, potentially helped by a "generous ruling" on the 17th hole, Hagen defeated Brady by one, 77-78, to win.

== Tournament summary ==
In January 1917, the United States Golf Association (USGA) announced that Brae Burn would host the 1917 U.S. Open. However, the event had to be delayed two years due to World War I. In June 1919, Brae Burn held the 1919 U.S. Open. The event was intended to be played over the course of three days, from Monday, June 9 to Wednesday, June 11. Eighteen holes would be played the first two days each and the finale would be 36 holes long. The champion would win a gold medal and $500. There were 135 players in the field: 110 professionals and 25 amateurs. The top 64 and ties would make the cut.

There was no clear-cut favorite to win the championship. Writing for The Boston Globe, D.J. McGuiness noted that, "There never has been a championship for the title for the past 10 years that the professionals were so much in doubt as to the winner." An amateur, Chick Evans, was the defending champion and another amateur, the 1913 champion Francis Ouimet, was an additional favorite. Ouimet himself thought that Evans and Jesse Guilford were the favorites among amateurs. Ouimet also agreed that it was difficult to pick a favorite. "[T]here are too many skilled and proven players," he wrote, "both amateur and professional, for anyone to accurately forecast the result of big events like the 'Open.'" John G. Anderson of the New York Herald concurred, stating in his column, "For the first time in many years there is no small group of two or three from whom to select as favorite as against the field." Among professionals, McGuiness noted that Mike Brady and Walter Hagen were among the favorites. The Globe writer also noted that former champions George Sargent, Alex Smith, and Fred McLeod could be near the top. In addition, McGuiness thought that professionals like Jim Barnes, Tom McNamara, and Louis Tellier were expected to be top contenders. Ouimet thought nine pros had a chance to win: Brady, Tellier, Barnes, Jock Hutchison, McNamara, Hagen, Tom Kerrigan, George Bowden, and Englishman James Douglas Edgar.

The preparation of the event received an extraordinary amount of media coverage. On the opening day, The Boston Globe put its coverage for the event on its first page next to the top story, a report about President Wilson's diplomatic visit to France in the wake of World War I. In the first round, Charlie Hoffner, from Philadelphia, took the lead with a 72 to tie the competitive course record, leading Louis Tellier and George Bowden by a stroke. Only 20 players broke 80. Hoffner was considered "a dark horse" and his lead was a surprise. However, Brady shot a second round 74 to take the midway lead by two over Hoffner. The New York Herald noted that Hagen shot "fine" golf of 73, nearly breaking the course record. The Hartford Courant elaborated that Hagen, "shot rare golf today" which "put himself into a position from which it is possible for him to win." He was in a tie for third, three back. Despite this, the following day, Brady shot a "fine 73 in the morning round," the third round, and "led the field by five well earned strokes." Brady's score was the lowest of the third round. Hagen was "his most formidable rival" at his point, shooting a 75, putting him in second place.

In the final round, though Brady was in the lead he was in an earlier group than Hagen. Brady "was unable to maintain the terrific clip" he possessed during the first three rounds. He shot a 39 on the first nine and lost a stroke to Hagen. The 10th hole, meanwhile, "proved to be the hole which cost Brady the match." He hit his second shot into a bunker and ultimately made 7. Hagen picked up two shots and the lead was down to two. On the 15th hole, Brady "miss[ed] a putt which stopped on the rim of the cup" to lose another stroke. On the 16th, Brady's third shot was stymied and he struggled to make a 5. Hagen, playing behind, "got away two beautiful shots" and made a par-four. They were now tied. Brady finished with two pars. Hagen had a chance to win on the final hole. He hit his approach to 10 feet. The "confident" Hagen got his caddy to solicit Brady, then in the clubhouse, to the green so he could observe Hagen's putt. Hagen wanted Brady, in his words, "to see me win the U.S. Open." However, his putt actually barely missed. He made four and there would be an 18-hole playoff the next day. Hagen and Brady tied at 301. They defeated the nearest competitors, Tom McNamara and Jock Hutchison, by five shots. Chick Evans, the defending champion, was the low amateur, defeating Francis Ouimet by six strokes.

The morning of the playoff, there were rumors that Hagen partied with singer Al Jolson the night before. However, this story may be apocryphal. Some think that Hagen created the illusion that he partied the night before − complete with a disheveled tuxedo − in attempt to give Brady the impression that he was disoriented. People thought he did this to weaken Brady's motivation to play well, thinking that Hagen was in poor health and would be an easy victory in this situation. Irrespective of the story, Brady "got away to a good start by scoring a 4 at the first hole" while Hagen scored a 5. After five holes it was tied. However, Hagen picked up two strokes at the 6th hole and another on the 9th to take a three-stroke lead at the turn. Overall, Brady scored a 41 over the front nine, his worst of the tournament. Brady then recorded a 6 on the 10th hole to fall four behind. However, for the remainder of the round Brady "played the better golf of the two." At the 11th, Hagen lost a stroke. Brady reportedly told his caddy around this time, "They [the putts] will start breaking for me soon." On the 12th and 14th holes, Brady sank 15-foot putts. This "brilliant work" reduced the lead to one. However, on the 16th hole Brady hit his approach in a bunker and made bogey. Hagen's lead returned to two shots.

Hagen's play on the final two holes was shaky, however. On the par-3 17th hole, he hit his tee shot astray. Hagen was given five minutes to find the ball. Brady noticed an object in a bank of mud. Hagen was allowed to pick up the object which turned out to be his ball. An official allowed Hagen to place his ball in the rough, where he would have an easier shot, rather than replace the ball into the bank of mud. Many observers found this to be a "generous ruling." Nonetheless, Brady outplayed Hagen by one shot on this hole and the lead was reduced to one. On the 18th, Hagen barely missed a brook with his drive, "half-topping" the shot. However, with his approach he "recovered with a clean hit to just short of the green." Brady hit a "perfect drive" but was unable to take advantage, missing the green with his approach. Hagen hit his third shot to within 18 inches assuring par. Brady needed to make his third shot to tie. He hit his chip shot "perfectly" with "the ball running to within three inches of the hole" but it barely missed. Hagen won by one, 77 to 78. Hagen was the second two-time champion after John McDermott. Brady finished runner-up for the second time, the first being at the 1911 U.S. Open, himself losing to McDermott, also in a playoff.

== Round summaries ==
=== First round ===
Monday, June 9, 1919

| Place | Player | Score | To par |
|---|---|---|---|
| 1 | (United States) Charles Hoffner | 72 | +1 |
| T2 | (United States) George Bowden | 73 | +2 |
| T2 | (France) Louis Tellier | 73 | +2 |
| 4 | (United States) Mike Brady | 74 | +3 |
| 5 | (United States) Francis Ouimet (a) | 76 | +5 |
| T6 | (England) Jim Barnes | 77 | +6 |
| T6 | (United States) Chick Evans (a) | 77 | +6 |
| T6 | (United States) Otto Hackbarth | 77 | +6 |
| T6 | (United States) Tom Mulgrew | 77 | +6 |
| T6 | (Scotland) Alec Ross | 77 | +6 |

=== Second round ===
Tuesday, June 10, 1919

| Place | Player | Score | To par |
|---|---|---|---|
| 1 | (United States) Mike Brady | 74-74=148 | +6 |
| 2 | (United States) Charles Hoffner | 72-78=150 | +8 |
| T3 | (United States) George Bowden | 73-78=151 | +9 |
| T3 | (United States) Walter Hagen | 78-73=151 | +9 |
| T3 | (France) Louis Tellier | 73-78=151 | +9 |
| T6 | (Scotland) John Cowan | 79-74=153 | +11 |
| T6 | (United States) Chick Evans (a) | 77-76=153 | +11 |
| T6 | (United States) Tom McNamara | 80-73=153 | +11 |
| 9 | (Scotland) Jock Hutchison | 78-76=154 | +12 |
| T10 | (England) Jim Barnes | 77-78=155 | +13 |
| T10 | (Scotland) Fred McLeod | 78-77=155 | +13 |
| T10 | (United States) Francis Ouimet (a) | 76-79=155 | +13 |
| T10 | (Scotland) Alec Ross | 77-78=155 | +13 |

=== Third round ===
Wednesday, June 11, 1919 (morning)

| Place | Player | Score | To par |
|---|---|---|---|
| 1 | (United States) Mike Brady | 74-74-73=221 | +8 |
| 2 | (United States) Walter Hagen | 78-73-75=226 | +13 |
| 3 | (United States) George Bowden | 73-78-76=227 | +14 |
| 4 | (Scotland) John Cowan | 79-74-75=228 | +15 |
| 5 | (Scotland) Jock Hutchison | 78-76-76=230 | +17 |
| T6 | (United States) George McLean | 81-75-76=232 | +19 |
| T6 | (United States) Tom McNamara | 80-73-79=232 | +19 |
| 8 | (France) Louis Tellier | 73-78-82=233 | +20 |
| T9 | (England) Jim Barnes | 77-78-79=234 | +21 |
| T9 | (Scotland) Fred McLeod | 78-77-79=234 | +21 |

=== Final round ===
Wednesday, June 11, 1919 (afternoon)

| Place | Player | Score | To par | Money ($) |
|---|---|---|---|---|
| T1 | (United States) Walter Hagen | 78-73-75-75=301 | +17 | Playoff |
| T1 | (United States) Mike Brady | 74-74-73-80=301 | +17 | Playoff |
| T3 | (Scotland) Jock Hutchison | 78-76-76-76=306 | +22 | 118 |
| T3 | (United States) Tom McNamara | 80-73-79-74=306 | +22 | 118 |
| T5 | (United States) George McLean | 81-75-76-76=308 | +24 | 66 |
| T5 | (France) Louis Tellier | 73-78-82-75=308 | +24 | 66 |
| 7 | (Scotland) John Cowan | 79-74-75-81=309 | +25 | 52 |
| 8 | (Scotland) Fred McLeod | 78-77-79-78=312 | +28 | 42 |
| T9 | (United States) George Bowden | 73-78-76-86=313 | +29 | 33 |
| T9 | (United States) Chick Evans (a) | 77-76-82-78=313 | +29 | 0 |

(a) denotes amateur

== Playoff ==
Thursday, June 12, 1919

| Place | Player | Score | To par | Money ($) |
|---|---|---|---|---|
| 1 | (United States) Walter Hagen | 77 | +6 | 475 |
| 2 | (United States) Mike Brady | 78 | +7 | 237 |
