= 1924 PGA Championship =

Coordinates: 38.528°N 86.648°W

Tournament information
- Dates: September 15–20, 1924
- Location: French Lick, Indiana
- Course: French Lick Springs Golf Club
- Organized by: PGA of America
- Tour: PGA Tour

Statistics
- Par: 72
- Length: 6,471 yards (5,917 m)
- Field: 32 to match play
- Cut: 150 (+6)
- Prize fund: $6,830

Champion
- (United States) Walter Hagen
- def. Jim Barnes, 2 up

Location in the United States
Location in Indiana

The 1924 PGA Championship was the seventh PGA Championship, held September 15–20 at the French Lick Springs Golf Club in French Lick, Indiana. Walter Hagen, the 1921 champion, defeated Jim Barnes in the finals, 2 up. It was the sixth of Hagen's eleven major titles.

The victory ran Hagen's match record at the PGA Championship in the 1920s to 15–1 (.938), falling only to Gene Sarazen in 38 holes in the 1923 finals. It was the first of Hagen's four consecutive PGA Championships; through 2013, no other player has won more than two consecutive titles. Barnes had won the first two titles in 1916 and 1919.

The field of 32 for match play was determined by the 36-hole stroke play qualifier on Monday, September 15. All matches were 36 holes, in a five-round single-elimination tournament. Two-time defending champion Sarazen lost in the second round to semifinalist Larry Nabholtz, 2 and 1.

Opened in 1917, the course was designed by Donald Ross.

== Format ==
The match play format at the PGA Championship in 1924 called for 12 rounds (216 holes) in six days:

- Monday - 36-hole stroke play qualifier
  - top 32 professionals advanced to match play
- Tuesday - first round - 36 holes
- Wednesday - second round - 36 holes
- Thursday - quarterfinals - 36 holes
- Friday - semifinals - 36 holes
- Saturday - final - 36 holes

== Bracket 1 ==
Round 1 September 16
Walter Hagen	6&5
Tom Harmon
Al Watrous	3&1
George Aulbach
Johnny Farrell	2&1
Neil Christian
Willie Macfarlane	5&4
Dow George

Round 2 September 17
Walter Hagen	4&3
Al Watrous
Johnny Farrell	3&1
Willie Macfarlane

Quarter-finals; September 18
Walter Hagen	3&2
Johnny Farrell

== Bracket 2 ==
Round 1 September 16
Jim Barnes	39 h
Mike Brady
Eddie Towns	4&3
Jock Hutchison
Emmet French	6&4
Jack Robertson
Mortie Dutra	3&1
Leo Diegel

Round 2 September 17
Jim Barnes	10&9
Eddie Towns
Emmet French	3&1
Mortie Dutra

Quarter-finals; September 18
Jim Barnes	6&4
Emmet French

== Bracket 3 ==
Round 1 September 16
Larry Nabholtz	2 up
Jack Forrester
Gene Sarazen	5&4
Fred McLeod
Henry Ciuci	4&2
Charles Hoffner
Dan Williams	6&4
Fred Baroni

Round 2 September 17
Larry Nabholtz	2&1
Gene Sarazen
Henry Ciuci	4&2
Dan Williams

Quarter-finals; September 18
Larry Nabholtz	5&4
Henry Ciuci

== Bracket 4 ==
Round 1 September 16
Ray Derr	2 up
Harry Hampton
Bobby Cruickshank	7&5
Willie Ogg
Al Espinosa	4&3
Arthur Ham
Francis Gallett	4&3
Bill Mehlhorn

Round 2 September 17
Ray Derr	37 h
Bobby Cruickshank
Al Espinosa	4&3
Francis Gallett

Quarter-finals; September 18
Ray Derr	2&1
Al Espinosa

== Final four ==
Semi-finals; September 19
Walter Hagen	8&7
Ray Derr
Jim Barnes	1 up
Larry Nabholtz

Finals; September 20
Walter Hagen	2 up
Jim Barnes
