= 1923 PGA Championship =

Coordinates: 40.895°N 73.801°W

Tournament information
- Dates: September 24–29, 1923
- Location: Pelham Manor, New York
- Course: Pelham Country Club
- Organized by: PGA of America
- Tour: PGA Tour
- Format: Match play - 6 rounds

Statistics
- Par: 74
- Length: 6,419 yards (5,870 m)
- Field: 64 players to match play
- Prize fund: $3,600

Champion
- (United States) Gene Sarazen
- def. Walter Hagen, 38 holes

Location in the United States
Location in New York
Location near New York City

The 1923 PGA Championship was the sixth PGA Championship, held September 24–29 in New York at Pelham Country Club in Pelham Manor, Westchester County. The field of 64 qualified by sectional tournaments, and competed in six rounds of match play, all at 36 holes in a single-elimination tournament.

In the final match on Saturday, defending champion Gene Sarazen met 1921 winner Walter Hagen, who had skipped the event the previous year. Sarazen won in 38 holes for his second consecutive PGA Championship and the third of his seven major titles.

Even in strokes (77) and holes after the morning round, Sarazen was two up with three holes to play, but consecutive bogeys left them all square and the 36th hole was halved with par fours. Both birdied the first extra hole with fours and the next was a driveable par four, a short downhill dogleg, and both went for the green. Hagen's tee shot was only twenty feet (6 m) from the cup but in a bunker, while Sarazen was in the rough and fifty feet (15 m) out. Hagen failed to exit the sand with his second shot, while Sarazen pitched to four feet (1.2 m) and sank it for a birdie to win. Hagen rebounded and won the next four PGA Championships (1924–1927).

== Bracket 1 ==
Round 1 September 24
Gene Sarazen	8&7
Lloyd Gullickson
D. K. White	9&8
Carl Rocco
Alec Campbell	4&3
Nick DeMane
Willie Klein	4&3
Charles Rowe
Jim Barnes	12&11
George Dernbach
John Cowan	9&8
Herbert Meyering
Cyril Walker	5&4
Willie Maguire
Harry Cooper	7&6
Alex Ellis, Jr.

Round 2 September 25
Gene Sarazen	11&10
D. K. White
Alec Campbell	4&3
Willie Klein
Jim Barnes	12&11
John Cowan
Cyril Walker	2&1
Harry Cooper

Round 3 September 26
Gene Sarazen	3&2
Alec Campbell
Jim Barnes	8&7
Cyril Walker

Quarter-finals; September 27
Gene Sarazen	1 up
Jim Barnes

== Bracket 2 ==
Round 1 September 24
Walter Hagen	4&3
George Griffin
Jack Elplick	4&2
Ralph Thomas
Johnny Golden	5&4
Wilbur Jack
Robert Barnett	5&4
Pat Doyle
Fred McLeod	7&6
Wiffy Cox
James Meehan	7&6
Austie Claeyssens
Clarence Hackney	6&5
Al Hackbarth
R. S. Miner	4&2
Jim Carberry

Round 2 September 25
Walter Hagen	10&9
Jack Elplick
Johnny Golden	1 up
Robert Barnett
Fred McLeod	4&3
James Meehan
Clarence Hackney	7&6
R. S. Miner

Round 3 September 26
Walter Hagen	4&3
Johnny Golden
Fred McLeod	1 up
Clarence Hackney

Quarter-finals; September 27
Walter Hagen	5&4
Fred McLeod

== Bracket 3 ==
Round 1 September 24
Bobby Cruickshank	2&1
Willie Leach
Herbert Obendorf	5&4
George Underwood
Ray Derr	2&1
Charles Hoffner
Frank Coltart	1 up
John Edmundson
Willie Macfarlane	6&5
George Stark
Wilfrid Reid	4&2
Louis Chiapetta
Jack Stait	7&6
Harry Ellis
Jack Forrester	6&4
Herbert Nicoll

Round 2 September 25
Bobby Cruickshank	7&5
Herbert Obendorf
Ray Derr	5&4
Frank Coltart
Willie Macfarlane	3&2
Wilfrid Reid
Jack Stait	1 up
Jack Forrester

Round 3 September 26
Bobby Cruickshank	1 up
Ray Derr
Willie Macfarlane	5&4
Jack Stait

Quarter-finals; September 27
Bobby Cruickshank	39h
Willie Macfarlane

== Bracket 4 ==
Round 1 September 24
George McLean	Def.
Dave Stevens
Jimmie Donaldson	Def.
Eddie Loos
Willie Ogg	2&1
Fred Baroni
Carl Anderson	37h
Stuart Sanderson
Joe Kirkwood, Sr.	6&4
William Goebel
James West	5&3
Alex Gerard
Johnny Farrell	1 up
Dave McKay
Willie Hunter	2&1
Al Watrous

Round 2 September 25
George McLean	6&4
Jimmie Donaldson
Willie Ogg	12&11
Carl Anderson
Joe Kirkwood, Sr.	1 up
James West
Johnny Farrell	4&3
Willie Hunter

Round 3 September 26
George McLean	38h
Willie Ogg
Joe Kirkwood, Sr.	1 up
Johnny Farrell

Quarter-finals; September 27
George McLean	5&4
Joe Kirkwood, Sr.

== Final four ==
Semi-finals; Friday, September 28
Gene Sarazen	7&5
Bobby Cruickshank
Walter Hagen	12&11
George McLean

Finals; Saturday, September 29
Gene Sarazen	38h
Walter Hagen

== Final match scorecards ==
Morning

Hole	1	2	3	4	5	6	7	8	9	10	11	12	13	14	15	16	17	18
Par	5	4	5	3	4	4	4	4	4	3	4	4	5	5	4	3	5	4
(United States) Sarazen	4	5	5	3	4	5	4	5	4	3	4	4	6	5	5	3	5	3
(United States) Hagen	5	4	5	3	4	4	4	5	4	3	5	4	4	6	4	3	5	5
Leader	S1	–	–	–	–	H1	H1	H1	H1	H1	–	–	H1	–	H1	H1	H1	–

Afternoon

Hole	1	2	3	4	5	6	7	8	9	10	11	12	13	14	15	16	17	18
Par	5	4	5	3	4	4	4	4	4	3	4	4	5	5	4	3	5	4
(United States) Sarazen	5	4	4	3	3	4	4	4	4	3	4	4	4	5	4	4	6	4
(United States) Hagen	5	4	5	3	4	4	5	4	4	3	3	4	4	5	4	3	5	4
Leader	–	–	S1	S1	S2	S2	S3	S3	S3	S3	S2	S2	S2	S2	S2	S1	–	–

Extra holes

Hole	1	2
Par	5	4
(United States) Sarazen	4	3
(United States) Hagen	4	4
Leader	–	S1

Birdie	Bogey
