= Des Moines Golf and Country Club =

Country club in Iowa, United States

Des Moines Golf & Country Club
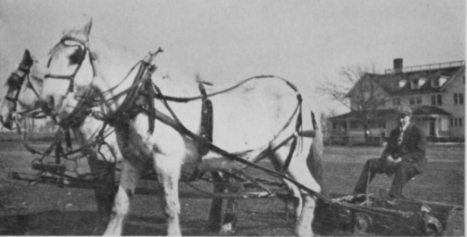
- Joe Roseman mowing the Des Moines Golf and Country Club course, c. 1910

- Location in the United States Location in Iowa
- 41.5934790°N 93.8163720°W

Club information
- Location: 1600 Jordan Creek Parkway; West Des Moines, Iowa
- Established: 1897, 1970 (present site)
- Type: Private
- Tota holes: 36
- Tournaments: 1999 U.S. Senior Open; 2017 Solheim Cup
- Website: dmgcc.org

North Course
- Designed by: Pete Dye
- Par: 72
- Length: 7,301 yards (6,676 m)
- Course rating: 74.9
- Slope rating: 135

South Course
- Designed by: Pete Dye
- Par: 73
- Length: 7,103 yards (6,495 m)
- Course rating: 74.2
- Slope rating: 135

Des Moines Golf and Country Club is a private country club in West Des Moines, Iowa, located few minutes west of Des Moines. Its golf courses have consistently been ranked in the top ten golf courses in the state of Iowa.

Established in 1899, it established its current site in 1970. In late September 1897, the foundation of the Des Moines Golf and Country Club was established. Newspaper accounts have the details: “A forty-acre field owned by Mr. J. S. Polk just north of the station at the end of Ingersoll Line will be fitted up for the grounds. Mr. Polk has consented to rent the ground to the club and become a member himself.”

An organizational meeting on October 7 ratified articles of incorporation. N. T. Guernsey was elected as the first president of the new club. The incorporation papers were filed in Polk County on October 11, 1897. In 1906, Joe Roseman was appointed as head professional and greens superintendent.

In 1923, the Ashworth estate in West Des Moines was purchased and a new 18-hole golf course was designed. Following a devastating fire in 1946, a new clubhouse was built and membership rose to 365. In 1966, the new east-west freeway (now Interstate 235) cut through the heart of the golf course and members voted to move and build a new facility, featuring two golf courses, doubling the size of the clubhouse as well as membership.

The club relocated to Dallas County in 1970, opening a new course on a hillside overlooking a valley in West Des Moines. Its tri-level clubhouse is the hub of all activities, including 12 tennis courts, an Olympic-size swimming pool, and the Pool and Tennis Pavilion.

The club hosted the 1999 U.S. Senior Open, with a record 200,000 fans showing up for the four-day event, won by Dave Eichelberger. It hosted the Solheim Cup in 2017.

== Golf courses ==
Location #1 – Located at the intersection of Ingersoll Avenue and Polk Boulevard, the first golf course was a haphazard 18 holes with no definition. It was later changed to a 9-hole course by designer Warren Dickinson. A "new" 9 was created with a "modern look" with fairways, trees, bunkers, and a few traps. The first Iowa Golf Association Championship was held on the grounds on August 28, 1900.

Location #2 – In 1903, Warren Dickinson, then club president, announced on October 2 that the current golf links would be turned back over to Mr. Polk and the club had secured a 20-year lease on 98 acres (40 ha) owned by the Gilchrest family near Waveland Golf Course. Thomas Bendelow, an employee of the Spalding Company, came to Des Moines on December 4 to design the new golf course. Bendelow designed over 600 courses in the United States.

Location #3 – In 1921, as the lease on the land for Location #2 was set to expire, the club made plans to move to 147 acres bought from the Ashworth family just off White Pole Road, later named Ashworth Road (current site of Dowling Catholic High School). At this time a faction of golfers led by the Hubbells and Denmans split off to build their own golf course on the south side of Des Moines called Wakonda Club. The new club on Ashworth was designed by the landscape architecture firm Pearse, Robinson, and Sprague. Warren Dickinson was also very prominent in the design of the new club. Upon moving to Location #4, 55 acres were sold to the Catholic Diocese for $320,000 and 80 acres (32 ha) were sold for a commercial plaza, residential and apartment housing for $650,000.

Location #4 (current site) – In 1957, the members learned of the planned east-west freeway (I-235) and planning was put into place to find an alternative site. In 1966, the members purchased 475 acres (1.9 km^{2}) in West Des Moines, and the first 18 holes were dedicated in the spring of 1968.
