= James West (golfer) =

English golfer (1885–1968)

Personal information
- Full name: James Eli West
- Nationality: England
- Born: 20 July 1885 Petersham, Surrey
- Died: September 1968 (aged 83) Lexington, Massachusetts

Career
- Sport: Golf
- Status: Professional

Best results in major championships
- Masters Tournament: DNP
- PGA Championship: T9: 1919
- U.S. Open: T18: 1919
- The Open Championship: DNP

James Eli West (20 July 1885 – September 1968) was an English professional golfer. He emigrated to the United States in 1916 and spent the rest of his life there. His best year in major championships was 1919 where he tied for 18th place in the U.S. Open and reached the quarter-finals of the PGA Championship.

== Professional career ==
Beginning as an apprentice club maker at an early age, West later became a greenkeeper at Mid-Surrey Golf Club under head greenkeeper Peter Lees and learnt his golf from the professional there, J. H. Taylor. He was the professional at Hamburg Golf Club for some time before being appointed to succeed Sam Whiting at Criccieth Golf Club in north Wales in late 1910. This appointment was very short-lived since Bertie Snowball became the professional there in early 1911. West returned to Germany and from Bremen won the 1911 German Professional Championship at Leipzig. In 1912 West became the professional at the newly opened Harrow Golf Club where he stayed until 1916.

Recruited by Spalding to represent sales of their clubs on Long Island, West emigrated to the United States in early 1916 and soon became the professional at Rockaway Hunting Club on Long Island. He had little success in the tournaments he had played in before World War I but, playing in the Metropolitan Open in July, he had a top-10 finish. West was an early member of the PGA of America and played in the Metropolitan section qualifying for the 1916 PGA Championship. He scored 153, tying for the lead with Willie Macfarlane. In the final stage he lost in the first round to Mike Brady.

West's best year in major championships was 1919. He tied for 18th place in the U.S. Open and reached the quarter-finals of the PGA Championship before losing 9 & 7 to George McLean.

West won the Long Island Professional Championship in 1921 by 7 strokes, the only time it was held. The following year saw the start of the Long Island Open. West led after the first day but faded and the event was won by Willie Klein.

His ability as an instructor won accolades. West's pupils included the Duke of Windsor, Gene Sarazen and Walter Hagen. The Hunt Club limited West's time at tournaments although in off-season he was lead instructor at a rooftop facility at the University Club in Manhattan and later as the professional at a private resort founded by Hunt Club members on Cat Cay island in the Bahamas.

== Results in major championships ==
Tournament	1916	1917	1918	1919	1920	1921	1922	1923	1924
U.S. Open		NT	NT	T18		T40		WD	T22
PGA Championship	R32	NT	NT	QF		R16		R32	

Note: West never played in The Open Championship.

Top 10
Did not play

NT = no tournament
WD = withdrew
R64, R32, R16, QF, SF = round in which player lost in PGA Championship match play
"T" indicates a tie for a place
