= 1920 PGA Championship =

Coordinates: 41.535°N 87.673°W

Tournament information
- Dates: August 17–21, 1920
- Location: Flossmoor, Illinois
- Course: Flossmoor Country Club
- Organized by: PGA of America
- Tour: PGA Tour
- Format: Match play - 5 rounds

Statistics
- Field: 32 players
- Prize fund: $2,580
- Winner's share: $500

Champion
- (Scotland) Jock Hutchison
- def. James Douglas Edgar, 1 up

Location in the United States
Location in Illinois

The 1920 PGA Championship was the third PGA Championship, which is now considered one of golf's major championships. It was held August 17–21 at the Flossmoor Country Club outside Flossmoor, Illinois, a suburb south of Chicago. The field of 32 qualified through sectional tournaments. They competed in 36-hole match play rounds in a single-elimination tournament.

Harry Hampton made a surprising run by winning three consecutive matches before finally succumbing to Jock Hutchison in a semi-final match 4 and 3. James Douglas Edgar won the other semi-final over George McLean by a resounding 8 and 7 margin. Hutchison defeated Edgar, 1 up, in the final.

Two-time defending champion Jim Barnes lost in the second round to Clarence Hackney, 5 and 4.

== Bracket 1 ==
Round 1 August 17
Jock Hutchison	5&3
Eddie Loos
Laurie Ayton, Snr	39th
Charles Hoffner
Louis Tellier	10&9
Joe Roseman
Charles Mayo	2&1
Lloyd Gullickson

Round 2 August 18
Jock Hutchison	5&3
Laurie Ayton, Snr
Louis Tellier	4&2
Charles Mayo

Quarter-finals; August 19
Jock Hutchison	6&5
Louis Tellier

== Bracket 2 ==
Round 1 August 17
James Douglas Edgar	1 up
Pat O'Hara
Joe Sylvester	4&3
Tom Boyd
Bob MacDonald	4&3
Leo Diegel
Bill Mehlhorn	3&2
Wallie Nelson

Round 2 August 18
James Douglas Edgar	11&9
Joe Sylvester
Bob MacDonald	1 up
Bill Mehlhorn

Quarter-finals; August 19
James Douglas Edgar	5&4
Bob MacDonald

== Bracket 3 ==
Round 1 August 17
Harry Hampton	6&5
Jack Gordon
George Thompson	3&2
Isaac Mackie
Clarence Hackney	3&2
Phil Hesler
Jim Barnes	4&3
George Bowden

Round 2 August 18
Harry Hampton	5&4
George Thompson
Clarence Hackney	5&4
Jim Barnes

Quarter-finals; August 19
Harry Hampton	4&3
Clarence Hackney

== Bracket 4 ==
Round 1 August 17
George McLean	6&5
George Sayers
Tom Kennett	2&1
Otto Hackbarth
Peter O'Hara	1 up
Pat Doyle
Alex Cunningham	2&1
Willie Macfarlane

Round 2 August 18
George McLean	8&7
Tom Kennett
Peter O'Hara	5&4
Alex Cunningham

Quarter-finals; August 19
George McLean	38th
Peter O'Hara

== Final four ==
Semi-finals; August 20
Jock Hutchison	4&3
Harry Hampton
James Douglas Edgar	8&7
George McLean

Finals; August 21
Jock Hutchison	1 up
James Douglas Edgar
