= Charles Hoffner =

American golfer (1896–1981)

Charlie Hoffner
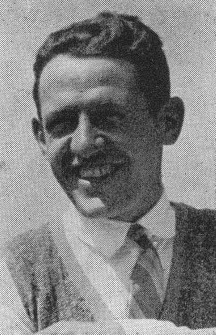
- Hoffner, c. 1922

Personal information
- Full name: Charles Harvey Hoffner
- Nationality: United States
- Born: October 20, 1896 Philadelphia, Pennsylvania, U.S.
- Died: November 9, 1981 (aged 85) Manatee County, Florida, U.S.
- Height: 5 ft 6.5 in (1.69 m)
- Spouse: Anna E. Smith
- Children: Audrey, Doris, Charles

Career
- Sport: Golf
- Turned professional: c. 1912
- Former tour: PGA Tour
- Professional wins: 4

Best results in major championships
- Masters Tournament: DNP
- PGA Championship: T17: 1920, 1922, 1924, 1925
- U.S. Open: T13: 1914, 1919
- The Open Championship: T54: 1921

Charles Harvey Hoffner (October 20, 1896 – November 9, 1981) was an American professional golfer. His best finish in an important tournament was a win at the first Philadelphia PGA Championship in 1922. In major championships, Hoffner tied for 13th place in the 1914 and 1919 U.S. Opens. He finished T17 in the 1920, 1922, 1924, and 1925 PGA Championships.

Hoffner had played in the 1921 International Challenge Match held at the Gleneagles Kings Course in Scotland. The match was the forerunner to the Ryder Cup matches. Upon his return to Philadelphia, Hoffner wrote an article in The Philadelphia Inquirer about the importance of the international sporting match for the greater good of relations between the people and governments of the two continents.

== Early life and family ==
Hoffner was born in Philadelphia, Pennsylvania, in 1896, the son of Ellerslie W. Hoffner and his wife Matilda. His first exposure to golf came as a caddie at Bala Golf Club in Philadelphia. At the young age of just 16, in 1912, he was promoted to assistant professional there and he remained in that position for the next two years.

He had two brothers, George and Robert, who were both accomplished players. His wife, Anna E. Smith of Philadelphia, was a descendant of Robert Morris, Jr., one of America's founding fathers. Their son, Charles Hoffner, Jr., was the head professional at several golf clubs in the Boca Raton, Florida, area.

== Golf career ==
Around 1916 Hoffner took a job at the Atlantic City Country Club serving as assistant under John McDermott. Over the course of his career he would serve at six different clubs, spending the longest period at Philmont Country Club in Huntingdon Valley, Pennsylvania. In the early 1930s, he owned a golf facility in South Miami Beach, where he was known to teach golf to part-time Miami Beach resident Al Capone. He finished tied for second with Jim Barnes in the 1916 Metropolitan Open behind Walter Hagen. At the 1919 Metropolitan Open he came third behind winner Hagen and second place finisher Emmett French.

=== 1919 U.S. Open ===
Hoffner was the first round leader in the 1919 U.S. Open. He shot a 72 in wet and cold conditions and tied the course record on the Brae Burn Country Club course which had been soaked with heavy rain the night before. He shot 78 in the second round and fell two shots off the pace set by Mike Brady. His full results were 72-78-77-89=316, tying for 13th place. He won $18 in prize money. The final round 89 ruined an opportunity for Hoffner to post a top-10 or even top-5 finish.

=== 1921 International Challenge Match ===
In May 1921, Hoffner and his eleven American teammates boarded the RMS Aquitania at New York and sailed to Southampton from where they traveled by train to Gleneagles at Perthshire, Scotland, where the forerunner to the Ryder Cup, the "International Challenge", would be played beginning on June 6, 1921. The American team, captained by Emmett French, did not fare very well in the match as they were beaten soundly by the team representing the United Kingdom by the score of 10 1/2 to 4 1/2. The American side didn't win any of the foursomes matches, but instead got their scoring in singles matches. It is unclear what Hoffner's results were.

=== 1921 Open Championship ===
After the Challenge Match concluded, a number of the American players stayed in the UK to play in the 1921 Open Championship being contested at the Old Course in St. Andrews. The Americans, playing as individuals, played much better and did themselves proud. Jock Hutchison won the tournament beating Roger Wethered in a playoff. Tom Kerrigan finished in third place. Hoffner carded rounds of 75-86-77-80=318 and finished T54 in his only British Open appearance. Prior to the tournament, in the first round of qualifying, he carded a fine 73—despite missing makeable putts on the last three holes—and finished just two shots shy of the Old Course record of 71 which was jointly held by George Duncan and two other players at the time.

=== Wins ===
Hoffner won the 1919 Pennsylvania Open at Whitemarsh Valley Country Club and was runner-up to Cyril Walker in 1921 and Johnny Farrell in 1927. He won the 1922 Philadelphia Open at Merion Golf Club east course. He was victorious in the Wood Memorial Tournament in 1947 and 1948.

== Death ==
Hoffner died on November 9, 1981, in Manatee County, Florida, aged 85.

== Tournament wins (4) ==
- 1919 Pennsylvania Open
- 1922 Philadelphia Open
- 1947 Wood Memorial Tournament
- 1948 Wood Memorial Tournament

== Results in major championships ==
| Tournament | 1914 | 1915 | 1916 | 1917 | 1918 | 1919 | 1920 | 1921 | 1922 | 1923 | 1924 | 1925 | 1926 | 1927 |
|---|---|---|---|---|---|---|---|---|---|---|---|---|---|---|
| The Open Championship | DNP | NT | NT | NT | NT | NT | DNP | T54 | DNP | DNP | DNP | DNP | DNP | DNP |
| U.S. Open | T13 | T24 | ? | NT | NT | T13 | ? | ? | T19 | WD | T40 | ? | ? | T47 |
| PGA Championship | NYF | NYF | DNP | NT | NT | DNP | R32 | DNP | R32 | R64 | R32 | R32 | DNP | DNP |

Note: Hoffner never played in the Masters Tournament.

NYF = Tournament not yet founded
NT = No tournament
DNP = Did not play
WD = Withdrew
? = Unknown
R64, R32, R16, QF, SF = Round in which player lost in PGA Championship match play
"T" indicates a tie for a place
