= Otto Hackbarth =

American golfer (1886–1967)

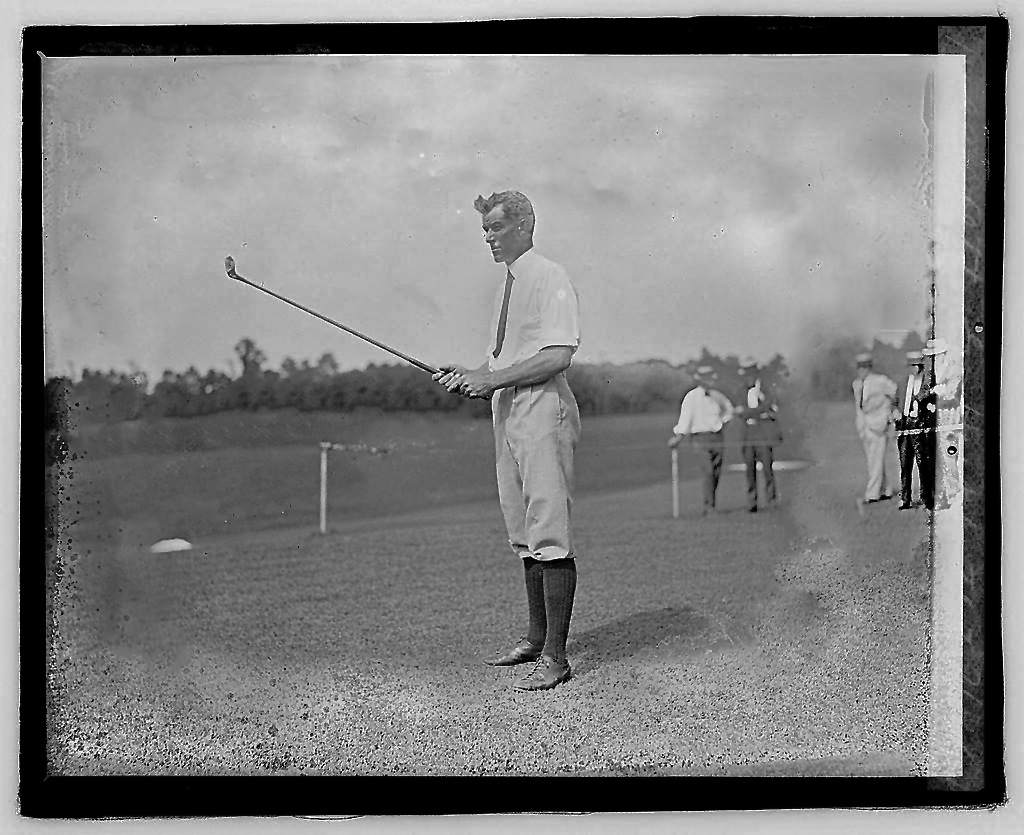
- Hackbarth in 1921

Personal information
- Full name: Otto Gustave Albert Hackbarth
- Nationality: United States
- Born: March 11, 1886 Granville, Wisconsin, US
- Died: July 24, 1967 (aged 81) Cincinnati, Ohio, US
- Height: 6 ft 2 in (188 cm)
- Spouse: Ella M. Hackbarth

Career
- Sport: Golf
- Turned professional: c. 1903

Best results in major championships
- Masters Tournament: DNP
- PGA Championship: T9: 1919
- U.S. Open: T7: 1912
- The Open Championship: DNP

Achievements and awards
- Southern Ohio PGA Hall of Fame: 2004

Otto Gustave Albert Hackbarth (March 11, 1886 – July 24, 1967) was an American professional golfer and club maker who played in the early-to-mid 20th century. His best performances in major golf championships were a T7 finish in the 1912 U.S. Open and a T9 showing in the 1919 PGA Championship. Hackbarth placed fourth in the 1913 Western Open and finished T4 in 1919.

== Early life ==
Hackbarth was born on March 11, 1886, in Granville, Wisconsin, the son of Carl Friedrich Hackbarth (1837–1893) and Henrietta Sylvester Hackbarth (1854–1952). He came from a family of golfers—his three brothers, Herman, John, and Alfred were also golf professionals. His brother Herman served as the professional at Little Rock Country Club from 1907–56 and designed a number of courses in Arkansas. Among his three brothers Alfred had the best tournament results, posting a number of good U.S. Open finishes including an 11th-place result in 1921 when he shot a 69 in the final round at Columbia Country Club.

== Golf career ==
In 1903, Hackbarth was playing out of Oconomowoc Country Club when he was a contestant in the Western Open in Milwaukee that year. He worked as a golf professional at the Hinsdale Golf Club in Chicago and also in St. Louis, Missouri, but his longest posting—from 1916 through 1951—was at Cincinnati Country Club. An expert club maker, he was known for his patented putter design called "the Hackbarth" that he created circa 1910. The putter was hickory-shafted and had a forked hosel. One example of the collectible putter sold for a hammer price of $5,000 in a Sotheby's auction in 2007. The great amateur, Chick Evans, used the putter as did prolific tournament winner Arthur Bartlett from Iowa.

=== 1912 U.S. Open ===
The 1912 U.S. Open was held August 1–2 at the Country Club of Buffalo in Amherst, New York, a suburb east of Buffalo. Hackbarth carded rounds of 77-77-75-76=305 and finished tied for seventh place with Jack Dowling. Both players won $45 in prize money. John McDermott won the tournament finishing two strokes ahead of runner-up Tom McNamara.

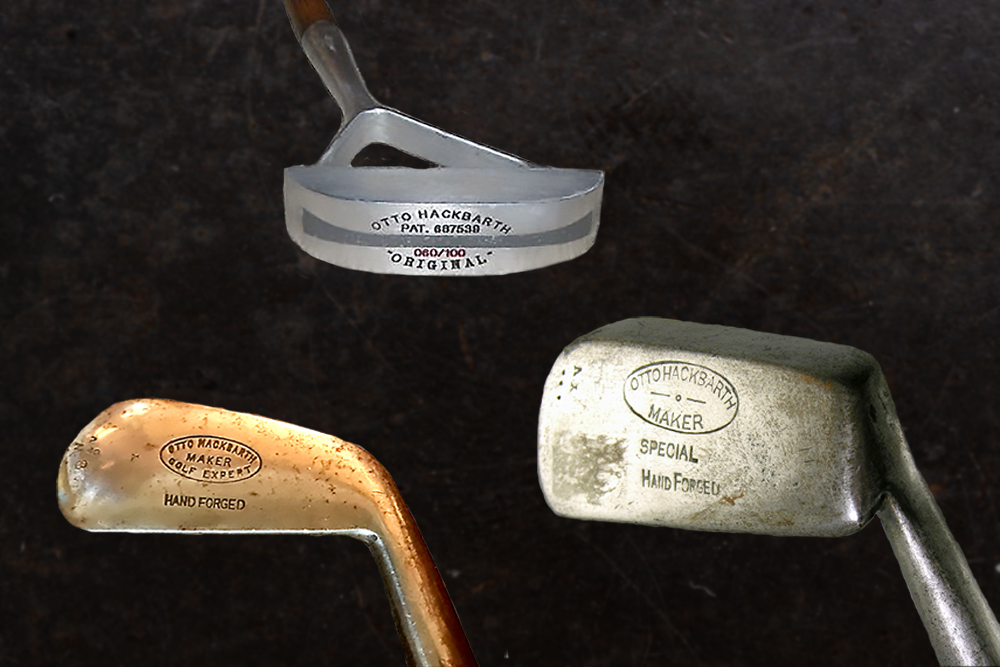
3 of Otto Hackbarth's original golf club designs. The famous Hackbarth putter is pictured in the top center.

=== 1919 PGA Championship ===
In the 1919 PGA Championship Hackbarth nearly upset eventual tournament winner Jim Barnes in the second round, losing by the slim margin of 3 and 2 after being 3 holes up after the first 18 holes of a 36-hole match play pairing. In the second 18-hole portion of the match Hackbarth experienced some difficulties. At the 4th hole his approach shot landed in a bunker and he hit his next shot thin, launching the ball into another bunker on the other side of the green; he scored 6 losing the hole. On the lengthy 9th hole Hackbarth battled back by laying a fine stymie and won the hole, Barnes being unable to hole a chip shot over the ball of Hackbarth which was blocking the hole.

The New York Times described the match as "the proverbial close shave". Hackbarth also played in the 1920 PGA Championship, losing in the first round.

=== PGA Seniors' Championship ===
Hackbarth won the 1940 PGA Seniors' Championship held at the North Shore Club in Sarasota, Florida, beating Jock Hutchison in a second 18-hole playoff. The players had tied on 74 in the first playoff and were required to play another 18 holes to determine the winner. In the second playoff, Hackbarth carded another 74 to Hutchison's 75. In 1938 Hackbarth finished second in the same event, losing in a playoff on that occasion to Fred McLeod.

== Death and legacy ==
Hackbarth died on July 24, 1967, in Cincinnati, Ohio, aged 81. He was buried in Summit Cemetery in Summit, Wisconsin. In his Last Will and Testament he bequeathed $1,000 each to a number of friends and relatives but left others nothing at all. In the Will, he fully explained why each of those not receiving money were being left out. He said quite matter of factly, "they will understand".

In 2004, he was inducted into the Southern Ohio PGA Hall of Fame.

== Results in major championships ==
Tournament	1904	1905	1906	1907	1908	1909	1910	1911	1912	1913	1914	1915	1916	1917	1918	1919	1920	1921	1922	1923	1924
U.S. Open	CUT	?	T22	?	T40	?	T23	T29	T7	CUT	27	T29	T19	NT	NT	T26	T43	T22	T47	?	T31
PGA Championship	NYF	NYF	NYF	NYF	NYF	NYF	NYF	NYF	NYF	NYF	NYF	NYF	DNP	NT	NT	R16	R32	DNP	DNP	DNP	DNP

Note: Hackbarth never played in the Masters Tournament or The Open Championship.

NYF = Tournament not yet founded
NT = No tournament
DNP = Did not play
? = Unknown
R64, R32, R16, QF, SF = Round in which player lost in PGA Championship match play
"T" indicates a tie for a place
Yellow background for top-10.
