= Columbia Country Club =

Country club and golf course in Chevy Chase, Maryland, US

Coordinates: 38°59′21″N 77°04′42″W

- Interactive map of Columbia Country Club

Club information
- Location: Chevy Chase, Maryland
- Established: August 25, 1909
- Type: Private
- Tota holes: 18
- Tournaments: 1921 U.S. Open, 2003 U.S. Junior Amateur Golf Championship, 2021 United States Girls' Junior Golf Championship
- Website: www.columbiacc.org
- Designed by: Herbert Barker
- Par: 70
- Length: 6,900 yards
- Course rating: 72.3
- Slope rating: 139

The Columbia Country Club is a private country club in unincorporated Chevy Chase, Maryland.

The club was founded in 1909 as an offshoot of the 11-year-old Columbia Golf Club in Washington, D.C. Its golf course, which opened in 1911, was designed by Herbert Barker.

The club hosted the U.S. Open golf tournament in 1921. Its members, who for eight decades kept themselves all-white and all-male, have included U.S. President Richard Nixon, former president Barack Obama, FBI Director J. Edgar Hoover, and five-star generals Omar Bradley and Hap Arnold.

== History ==
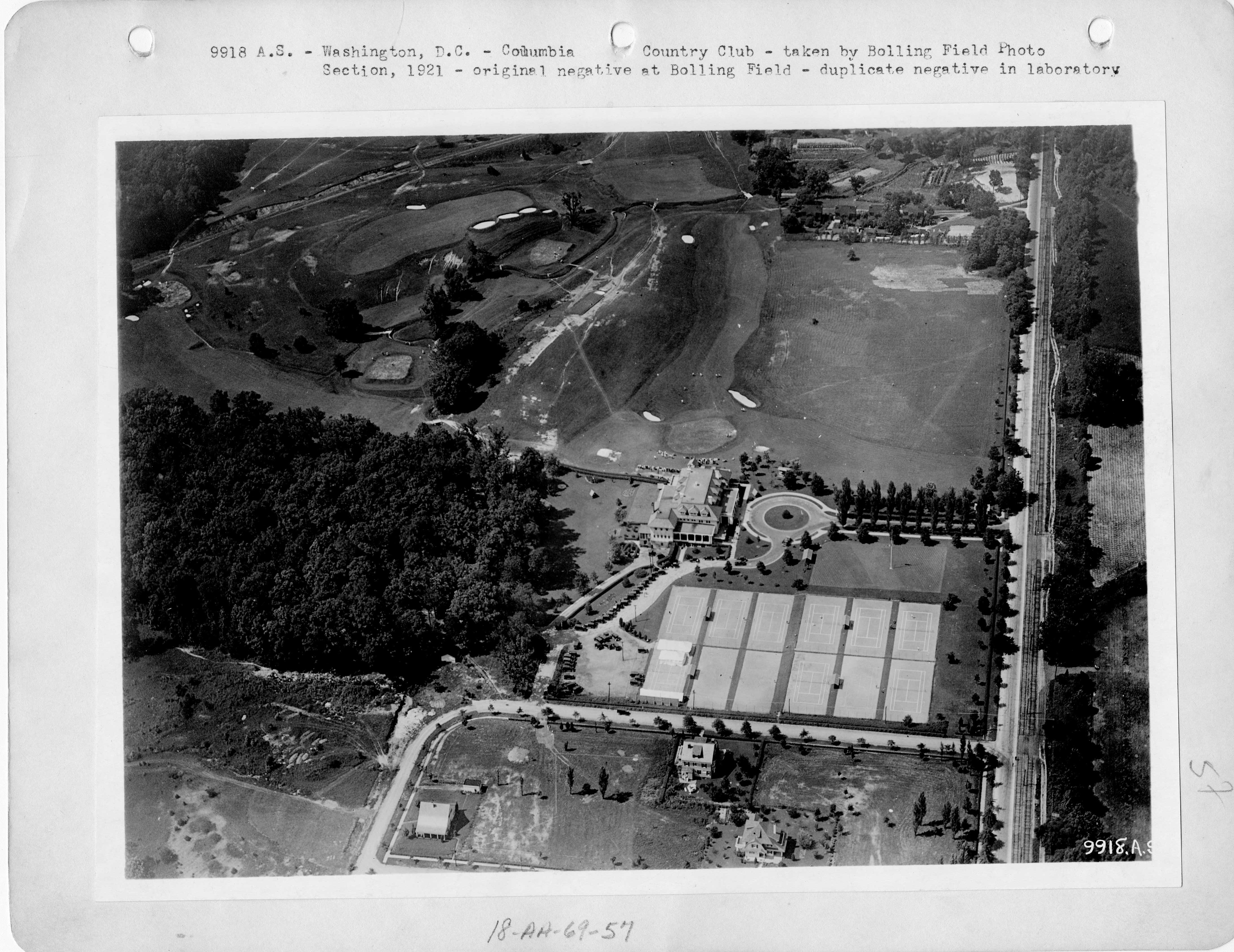
A 1921 aerial view of Columbia Country Club, looking north

The Columbia Golf Club was founded by nine men on September 29, 1898. Its original location was in Washington, D.C., on the east side of Brightwood Avenue, afterwards known as Georgia Avenue NW, in the neighborhood of Schuetzen Park (today's Park View). The club soon moved "to a site further north on the west side where a vacant lot was converted into a crude nine-hole golf course," according to a club history.

Presently, a larger site was desired, and so a new club was incorporated on August 25, 1909, with 200 of the Columbia Golf Club's 600 members. This new Columbia Country Club purchased its present site on Connecticut Avenue that year from the Chevy Chase Land Company, which offered favorable terms to the club in hopes of attracting home buyers to its nearby developments. The 126-acre (51 ha) site consisted of two parcels of forest and farmland separated by a 100-foot-wide right-of-way held by the Baltimore & Ohio railroad. The club built its golf course on both sides of the rail line. For more than a half-century, club members would cross the tracks to golf alongside trains hauled by steam and then diesel locomotives between the B&O's busy Metropolitan Branch and Georgetown's industrial waterfront.

The clubhouse was designed by club member Frederick B. Pyle, whose design was selected from a pool of four. The new club opened on January 6, 1911. The golf course, completed that same year, was designed by Herbert Barker, a noted golfer and course architect of the day. Walter Travis made extensive renovations to the course in 1915. There is no newspaper record of the event and early Club minutes have been lost. The course was a favorite of President Woodrow Wilson.

The U.S. Open was held at the Club in 1921, won by Englishman Jim Barnes. President Warren Harding presented the Champion's Trophy.

The first swimming pool, donated by Donald Woodward, opened in 1925. The club added several acres in the 1930s, bringing it to 146.38 acres. Later, an Olympic-sized pool was built; the entire area was renovated in 1978. Platform tennis courts were added to the regular courts in the 1960s.

Like many clubs of its era, the all-white, all-male Columbia Country Club discriminated for decades against women and non-white people, barring them from membership and forbidding female guests to enter certain dining areas. That began to change in 1989, when the state of Maryland threatened to take away a tax break unless the club ceased to "discriminate in granting memberships or offering club services," the Washington Post reported. The club agreed. Still, the following year, the club had 1,635 members, all men. None were Black or Latino.

That year, there was an eight-year waiting list for prospective members, the longest among 47 private clubs near Washington, D.C., that responded to a Washington Post survey. The initial fee to join at the time was $22,000 (equivalent to $54,000 today).

By 1994, the club had begun admitting women members.

The club hosted the 2003 U.S. Junior Amateur Golf Championship, won by Brian Harman.

In 2009, the club completed a renovation and expansion of the club house, adding an indoor swimming pool, better fitness center, a duckpin bowling alley, locker rooms, ice-skating rink (winter only), and more parking.

In 2021, the club hosted the U.S. Girls' Junior Golf Championship, won by Rose Zhang.

In late 2022, the club began a three-year renovation of its clubhouse's lower level that aims to expand the kitchen and update it, the dining room, and the locker rooms.

The club has employed only four head golf professionals in its century-plus of operation: Fred McLeod, William Strausbaugh, Robert Dolan, and Steven Delmar.

=== Opposition to the Georgetown Branch Trail ===
In the 1990s, Columbia Country Club tried to prevent the opening of a rail trail on the old B&O rail line around which the club had built its golf course.

After B&O successor CSX ended service along the line in 1985, the government of Montgomery County bought the right-of-way to preserve it for use as a potential trolley route between Bethesda and Silver Spring. Over the following decade, the track roadbed was converted to the Georgetown Branch Trail, an eastward extension of the Capital Crescent Trail, which followed the old B&O right-of-way from Bethesda to Georgetown.

Club members objected to this reuse of the right-of-way. They sued the county and the United States for damages after the trail was opened, alleging that repurposing the old freight line for use by hikers and bikers was an unconstitutional taking. Their argument was rejected in 1999 by the U.S. Court of Federal Claims.

=== Opposition to the Purple Line ===
Within a few years of its unsuccessful effort to block one proposed reuse of the old railroad right-of-way, Columbia Country Club became a prominent opponent of another: Maryland's Purple Line, a 16-mile light-rail line that is to connect downtown Bethesda and New Carrollton. The club's lobbying efforts slowed efforts to build the transit line and secured secret concessions not given to other property owners along the line.

In 2000, the Maryland government began to formally study a long-proposed light-rail line along the right-of-way. The two-track transit line would use a wider swath of the right-of-way than did the old single-track freight line, while staying within Montgomery County's property lines. But it would require the club to alter several holes that it had expanded over the years onto the railroad's right-of-way.

Within two years, the club had spent thousands of dollars on lobbying against the proposal, while individual members had held fundraisers for sympathetic politicians. In 2008, the club's leaders said they were increasing their "community and government relations efforts at the state and federal level", including organizing "grassroots" opposition. By 2013, the club was "long viewed as one of the most well-financed and politically connected Purple Line foes", the Washington Post wrote.

That year, the club secured a 25-page agreement with the Maryland Transit Administration and Montgomery County. Under the agreement, the planned Purple Line route would be moved about 12 feet to the north for 1,700 feet, protecting clubhouse views and sparing four of the holes that the club had built on the railroad's right-of-way. "Other concessions include a one-year limit for construction vehicles to use club property, guaranteed four-foot sound walls and promises of meetings at least every three months to discuss ongoing work. The county also agreed to give the club, at no cost, 'exclusive' use of two golf-cart underpasses and county-owned land where the golf course already exists", the Washington Post reported.

The agreement also prevented the signatories from talking about the agreement, and bound the club to stop opposing the project. But the agreement did not bind individual club members, who continued their opposition by lobbying and giving money to elected officials for at least two years.

== The course ==
Columbia's par-70 (35-35) course measures 6,900 yards (6,300 m) with a course rating of 72.3 and slope rating of 139.

The course favors shotmaking and finesse over the ability to drive the ball long distances. The natural topography of the area means that Columbia's course is very hilly, with tight fairways and small, undulating greens. Course superintendents generally keep the Columbia greens at a very high speed, and rarely do they roll anything less than an 11 on the Stimp meter.

A common saying among members and caddies is that "there are only two flat lies at Columbia, on the tee and in your pocket". Driving the ball long distances can get a player into trouble due to deep rough, side-hill lies, pot bunkers, and the aforementioned tight fairways. Almost every approach shot plays uphill or downhill, with severe downhill plays on #2, #5, #12, #14, #15, and #16. Hole #17 at Columbia is a unique hole, requiring a 200-yard tee shot to a short but wide of fairway, then a 70-yard chip uphill to a green sloped from front to back.

The signature hole is the par-3 16th, which, legend has it, served as Bobby Jones's inspiration for the 12th hole at Augusta National Golf Club. The hole plays to a very long, narrow green with three levels that is guarded along the front by a large pond and a pot bunker, with another pot bunker behind it. The hole has been rated among the best in the area.

With the exception of the eighth hole, there have been changes on all holes of the course. Major changes have been made on the 15th, 16th, and 17th holes, made possible by the construction of a water line through the area by the Washington Suburban Sanitary Commission under its power of eminent domain. In 2012, new tee boxes and a better irrigation system were added.

In September 2022, Columbia completed an overhaul of its golf course that installed a modern irrigation and drainage system, renovated bunkers, and re-sodded the fairways with a hybrid Bermuda-rye grass mix.

A landscaped channel carries Coquelin Run past or through holes 1, 15, 16, 17, and 18; it is dammed at the 17th hole to create a 250-yard-long pond south of the green, where it is joined by other streams.
