= 1921 U.S. Open (golf) =

Coordinates: 38.989°N 77.079°W

Tournament information
- Dates: July 21–22, 1921
- Location: Chevy Chase, Maryland
- Course: Columbia Country Club
- Organized by: USGA
- Format: Stroke play − 72 holes

Statistics
- Par: 70
- Field: 84
- Cut: none
- Winner's share: $500

Champion
- (England) Jim Barnes
- 289 (+9)

Location in the United States
Location in Maryland

The 1921 U.S. Open was the 25th U.S. Open, held July 21–22 at Columbia Country Club in Chevy Chase, Maryland, a suburb northwest of Washington, D.C. Jim Barnes won his only U.S. Open, nine strokes ahead of runners-up Walter Hagen and Fred McLeod, both former champions. It was the third of Barnes' four major championships.

Barnes shot an opening round 69 on Thursday morning and led wire-to-wire; he led McLeod by four after the second round, and by seven through 54 holes. President Warren G. Harding was in attendance for the final round on Friday afternoon and presented the championship cup and medal to Barnes. Barnes' play was described by Evening Star sports reporter Walter R. McCallum as "a remarkable brand of golf by playing with the most implicit confidence and coolness".

Chick Evans, the 1916 champion, edged 19-year-old Bobby Jones by a single stroke for low amateur, finishing alone in fourth place. Two-time champion Alex Smith played in his last major and finished in a tie for fifth place.

== Round summaries ==
=== First round ===
Thursday, July 21, 1921 (morning)

Place	Player	Score	To par
1	(England) Jim Barnes	69	−1
2	(Scotland) George Duncan	72	+2
3	(United States) Chick Evans (a)	73	+3
T4	(United States) Clarence Hackney	74	+4
T4	(United States) Emil Loeffler	74	+4
T4	(United States) Fred McLeod	74	+4
T7	(United States) Leo Diegel	75	+5
T7	(United States) Emmet French	75	+5
T7	(United States) Jock Hutchison	75	+5
T7	(Australia) Joe Kirkwood	75	+5
T7	(Canada) Charlie Murray	75	+5
T7	(Scotland) Alex Smith	75	+5

=== Second round ===
Thursday, July 21, 1921 (afternoon)

Place	Player	Score	To par
1	(England) Jim Barnes	69-75=144	+4
T2	(United States) Fred McLeod	74-74=148	+8
T2	(Canada) Charlie Murray	75-73=148	+8
4	(United States) Bobby Jones (a)	78-71=149	+9
T5	(Scotland) George Duncan	72-78=150	+10
T5	(United States) Clarence Hackney	74-76=150	+10
T5	(Scotland) Alex Smith	75-75=150	+10
T5	(France) Louis Tellier	76-74=150	+10
T9	(United States) Chick Evans (a)	73-78=151	+11
T9	(United States) Emil Loeffler	74-77=151	+11

=== Third round ===
Friday, July 22, 1921 (morning)

Place	Player	Score	To par
1	(England) Jim Barnes	69-75-73=217	+7
T2	(United States) Walter Hagen	79-73-72=224	+14
T2	(United States) Fred McLeod	74-74-76=224	+14
4	(United States) Emil Loeffler	74-77-74=225	+15
T5	(United States) Emmet French	75-77-74=226	+16
T5	(United States) Bobby Jones (a)	78-71-77=226	+16
7	(United States) Chick Evans (a)	73-78-76=227	+17
T8	(Scotland) George Duncan	72-78-78=228	+28
T8	(United States) Clarence Hackney	74-76-78=228	+28
T8	(France) Louis Tellier	76-74-78=228	+28

=== Final round ===
Friday, July 22, 1921 (afternoon)

Place	Player	Score	To par	Money ($)
1	(England) Jim Barnes	69-75-73-72=289	+9	500
T2	(United States) Walter Hagen	79-73-72-74=298	+18	250
T2	(United States) Fred McLeod	74-74-76-74=298	+18	250
4	(United States) Chick Evans (a)	73-78-76-75=302	+22	0
T5	(United States) Emmet French	75-77-74-77=303	+23	125
T5	(United States) Bobby Jones (a)	78-71-77-77=303	+23	0
T5	(Scotland) Alex Smith	75-75-79-74=303	+23	125
T8	(Scotland) George Duncan	72-78-78-77=305	+25	85
T8	(United States) Clarence Hackney	74-76-78-77=305	+25	85
10	(United States) Emil Loeffler	74-77-74-81=306	+26	75

(a) denotes amateur
