= Harry Hampton (golfer) =

Scottish-American golfer

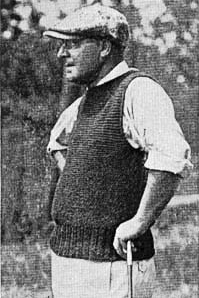
- Hampton, c. 1921

Personal information
- Nationality: Scotland
- Born: March 21, 1889 Montrose, Scotland
- Died: May 5, 1965 (aged 76) Santa Monica, California
- Height: 5 ft 7 in (1.70 m)
- Weight: 183 lb (83 kg; 13.1 st)
- Spouse: Victoria Mary Harding (m. 1911)
- Children: 4

Career
- Sport: Golf
- Turned professional: c. 1908
- Former tour: PGA Tour
- Professional wins: 7

Number of wins by tour
- PGA Tour: 2
- Other: 5

Best results in major championships
- Masters Tournament: DNP
- PGA Championship: T3: 1920
- U.S. Open: T7: 1927
- The Open Championship: DNP

Harry Hampton (March 21, 1889 – May 5, 1965) was a Scottish-born professional golfer who played primarily in the United States. His best finish in a major championship was a tie for third place in the 1920 PGA Championship when he met Jock Hutchison (the eventual winner of the tournament) in a semi-final match and lost 4 and 3. He finished T7 in the 1927 U.S. Open and won seven tournaments during his professional playing career. Hampton was a good iron player and made 16 holes-in-one in his lifetime.

== Early life ==
Hampton was born on March 21, 1889, in Montrose, Scotland. He emigrated to the United States in 1910.

== Professional career ==
Hampton was described as a good ball striker, however his putting was adversely affected by poor vision in one eye. Hampton served as professional at a number of clubs in Massachusetts and was also posted at clubs in South Carolina, Virginia, Ohio, Michigan, Illinois, and Canada.

In May 1921, Hampton's eleven American teammates boarded the RMS Aquitania at New York and sailed to Southampton from where they traveled by train to Gleneagles at Perthshire, Scotland, where the forerunner to the Ryder Cup, the "International Challenge", would be played beginning on June 6, 1921. Hampton, even though he was selected for the team, for reasons unknown decided at the last moment that he would not make the trip. The likely reason was that he was not an American citizen. In order to become a team member it was required that all players be either U.S. born or naturalized American citizens. Hampton wasn't naturalized until 1955. The American team, captained by Emmett French, was taken to the woodshed for a 10½ to 4½ beating.

== Personal life ==
On November 10, 1911, he married Victoria Mary Harding (1887–1973) in Canada. He became a U.S. citizen in 1955.

Hampton died in Santa Monica, California, on May 5, 1965.

== Professional wins (7) ==
=== PGA Tour wins (2) ===
- 1922 Pinehurst Amateur-Pro Best-Ball
- 1926 Southeastern PGA Championship

=== Other wins (5) ===
- 1911 Nova Scotia Open
- Jacksonville Open
- 1923 Michigan Open
- Miami Open
- 1930 Illinois PGA Senior Championship

== Results in major championships ==
| Tournament | 1915 | 1916 | 1917 | 1918 | 1919 | 1920 | 1921 | 1922 | 1923 | 1924 | 1925 |
|---|---|---|---|---|---|---|---|---|---|---|---|
| U.S. Open | T41 | NT | NT | NT | T11 | 22 | T22 | T19 | T49 | WD | T20 |
| PGA Championship | NYF | | NT | NT | R16 | SF | R32 | R16 | | R32 | |

| Tournament | 1926 | 1927 | 1928 | 1929 | 1930 | 1931 | 1932 | 1933 | 1934 | 1935 | 1936 | 1937 |
|---|---|---|---|---|---|---|---|---|---|---|---|---|
| U.S. Open | T27 | T7 | T25 | T38 | | | | 57 | | | | CUT |
| PGA Championship | QF | | | | | | | | | | | |

Note: Hampton never played in the Masters Tournament or The Open Championship.

Top 10
Did not play

NYF = tournament not yet founded
NT = no tournament
CUT = missed the half-way cut
WD = withdrew
R32, R16, QF, SF = round in which player lost in PGA Championship match play
"T" indicates a tie for a place
