= Flossmoor Country Club =

Private country club in Bloom Township, Illinois

Coordinates: 41.535214°N 87.670792°W

Flossmoor Golf Club is a private country club located in Bloom Township, Cook County, just outside the village limits of Flossmoor, Illinois. Founded in 1899 as Homewood Country Club and designed by Herbert J. Tweedie, its name was later changed to Flossmoor.

The club hosted the PGA Championship in 1920, which Jock Hutchison won. Flossmoor also was host to the 1923 U.S. Amateur Championship.

Bobby Jones held the course record for over 60 years. Jones often played Midwest courses during World War II in an attempt to help raise money for the American Red Cross. Jones's feat occurred after making a triple bogey and then following it up with eight consecutive 3's for a course record of 66. This record held until 1996, when a member, Mark Egge, broke it with a 65.
