= Engineers Country Club =

Country club in Roslyn Harbor, New York

Coordinates: 40°49′13″N 73°38′32″W

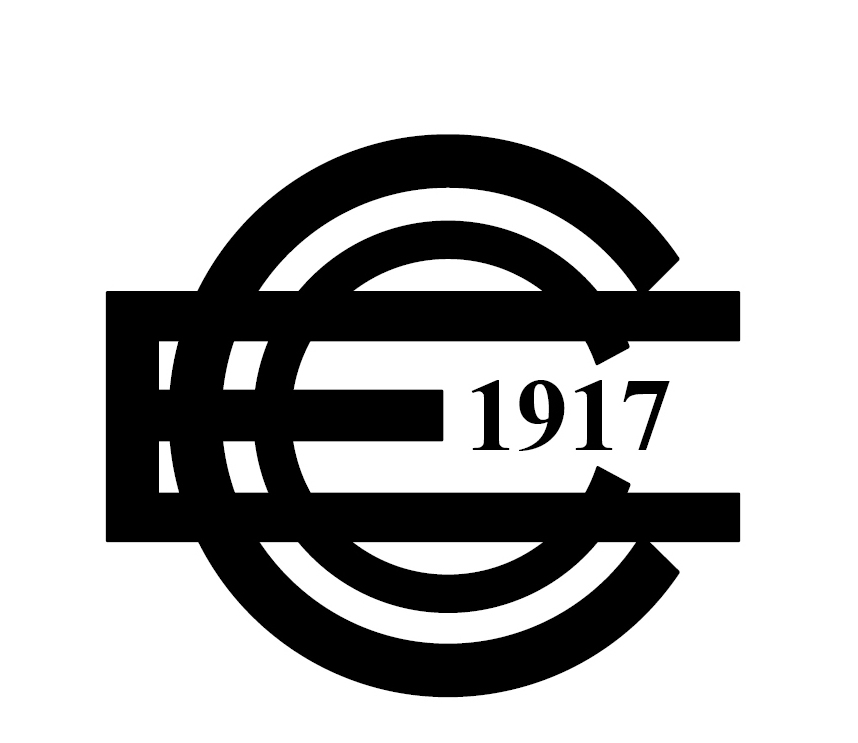
- Interactive map of Engineers Country Club

Club information
- Location: Roslyn Harbor, New York, United States
- Established: 1917
- Type: Private
- Total holes: 18
- Tournaments: PGA Championship (1919); U.S. Amateur (1920)
- Website: www.engineerscc.com
- Designed by: Herbert Strong; Devereux Emmet
- Par: 71
- Length: 6,767 yards (6,188 m)
- Course rating: 72.7
- Slope rating: 131

Engineers Country Club is a historic country club located in Roslyn Harbor, New York, on the historic Gold Coast of Long Island's North Shore.

== History ==
Founded as a Jewish country club, the club has an 18-hole championship golf course which hosted the PGA Championship in 1919 and the U.S. Amateur in 1920. The competitions were won by Jim Barnes and Chick Evans, respectively. Herbert Strong was the architect of the original golf course and Devereux Emmet remodeled part of the course in 1921.

The golf course was constructed on the former grounds of the W. R. Willet Manor estate. The property was purchased by the Engineers Country Club in March 1917, which had been formed on January 21, 1917 by the Engineers Club of Manhattan.The first round on the newly constructed course was played on June 29, 1918. The first foursome out consisted of club president B. G. M. Thomas, vice president Nat M. Garland, Frank Dupont, chairman of the Building Committee, and T. I. Jones, one of the governors. After completion of his round, Garland described the 18th green as "sui generis, rara avis ... in a class by itself".

Engineers Country Club plays 6,767 yards (6,188 m) yards from the black tees, 6,575 yards (6,012 m) from the blue tees, 6,218 yards (5,686 m) from the white, 5,538 yards (5,064 m) from the gold tees and 5,145 yards (4,705 m) from the red women's tees. The women's championship tees are farther back at 6,218 yards (5,686 m).

The signature 14th hole, which for a time had been abandoned, has now been reintegrated to the main golf course and is open for play. This short 90-yard (82 m) par three with a classic postage stamp green was dubbed the "Two or Twenty Hole" due to the fact that in 1919 Bobby Jones and Gene Sarazen both took double figures on the tricky hole. There is a sign near the tee box referring to the difficulties Jones and Sarazen experienced while playing the hole.

In August 1920 a sports writer said, "No young club in the history of golf, let it go back 400 years, has come in for as much discussion and comment as Engineers. The main nerve test will be on the greens. You will find strong men weeping as they finish a round."

In July 1924, prior to the playing of the Metropolitan Open at Engineers Country Club, golf writer George Trevor of the Brooklyn Daily Eagle described the golf course:

The lure of the Engineers [course] is difficult to capture in words, but to this writer it will always remain one of the most fascinating of golf courses. The Engineers’ course glorifies the second shot. We know of few links that put such a premium on an accurate approach. The greens are not surrounded by ghastly traps as are those at Garden City and Inwood. They don’t have to be. Nature went mere man one better when she undertook to flank the Roslyn greens with deep ravines, insidious gulches and yawning chasms. Let your approach be a bit off the line at Roslyn and you are apt to be looking up at the carpet, niblick in hand, wondering how you are ever going to make the pesky pill stick on the green even should you be fortunate enough to excavate the ball cleanly.

— George Trevor

Since 1998 the club has completed major renovations to update its facilities. In 2004, club president Jonathan Gold stated, "We became kid-friendly about six years ago. We built a kiddie pool and playground, and we hold events such as carnivals. Making it attractive for children is a big draw. We are relaxing a lot of the age-old rules that have been part of these old-time country clubs that would frown on kids under a certain age."

In 2018, Engineers Country Club was sold to RXR Realty.

== See also ==
- Inwood Country Club
- Seawane Country Club
