= Tom Boyd (golfer) =

Irish-American golfer

Personal information
- Full name: Thomas Boyd
- Nationality: Ireland
- Born: 7 January 1888 Armagh, Ireland
- Died: 29 November 1952 (aged 64)

Career
- Sport: Golf
- Turned professional: c. 1909
- Former tour: PGA Tour
- Professional wins: 1

Number of wins by tour
- PGA Tour: 1

Best results in major championships
- Masters Tournament: DNP
- PGA Championship: T9: 1921
- U.S. Open: T20: 1925
- The Open Championship: DNP

Thomas Boyd (7 January 1888 – 29 November 1952) was an Irish-American professional golfer who played in the early-to-mid 20th century. His best U.S. Open finish was T20 in 1925 and his best PGA Championship effort came in 1921 when he finished T9.

== Early life ==
Boyd was born on 7 January 1888 in Armagh, Ireland. Little is known of his early life although like contemporaries from his era he likely first started as a caddie and progressed to a career as a professional golfer from there. He also learned, as did almost all pro golfers in the early 20th century, to make golf clubs from scratch.

== Golf career ==
Boyd emigrated to the United States in 1915. He served as the head professional of the Fox Hills Golf Club in Stapleton, New York. Boyd had several fine finishes in both the U.S. Open and the PGA Championship. His best tournament was the 1921 PGA Championship when he reached the round of 16, eventually placing in a tie for 9th place. He defeated Eddie Towns in a first round match by default. He then lost in a second round match to Walter Hagen by the score of 6 and 5. He won once on the PGA Tour, in 1925.

=== Memorable matches ===
Boyd was involved in a memorable match on October 6, 1918, at Fox Hills Golf Club when he was paired with Jerome Travers to win 1 up after an extra hole to break a tie. They defeated the opposing amateur pair of A. Lucien Walker Jr. and A. F. Kammer. The charity match raised $1,000 for the American Red Cross which used the funds to support the war effort during World War I.

In an even more high-profile match held on July 23, 1920, at Fox Hills, Boyd and George Fotheringham went up against Harry Vardon, then the 6-time Open Championship winner, and his partner Ted Ray. The touring British duo – who seldom lost matches – triumphed in this match as well. Ray was in particularly good form in 1920; just more than a month after the Boyd/Fotheringham match he won the U.S. Open at Inverness Club.

== Death and legacy ==
Boyd died in 1952. He is best remembered as a touring golf professional with a number of good finishes in golf major championships.

== Results in major championships ==
Tournament	1915	1916	1917	1918	1919	1920	1921	1922	1923	1924	1925	1926	1927	1928	1929	1930
U.S. Open	T37	T39	NT	NT	?		T26	54			T20				T30	CUT
PGA Championship	NYF		NT	NT	R32	R32	R16	R32								

Note: Boyd never played in the Masters Tournament or The Open Championship.

Top 10
Did not play

NYF = tournament not yet founded
NT = no tournament
CUT = missed the half-way cut
T = tied for a place
? = unknown
R32, R16, QF, SF = round in which player lost in PGA Championship match play
