= George McLean (golfer) =

American professional golfer

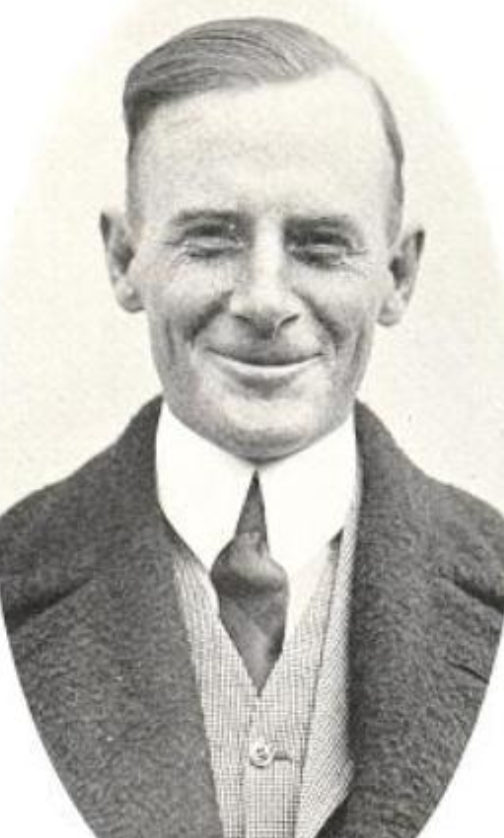
- McLean from a 1921 publication

Personal information
- Full name: George Louis McLean
- Nationality: United States
- Born: September 1, 1893 Yonkers, New York, U.S.
- Died: March 26, 1951 (aged 57) Waterloo, New York, U.S.
- Height: 5 ft 9 in (1.75 m)

Career
- Sport: Golf
- Status: Professional
- Former tour: PGA Tour
- Professional wins: 2

Number of wins by tour
- PGA Tour: 2

Best results in major championships
- Masters Tournament: DNP
- PGA Championship: T3: 1919, 1920, 1923
- U.S. Open: T5: 1919
- The Open Championship: T26: 1921

George Louis McLean (September 1, 1893 – March 26, 1951) was an American professional golfer. He competed from the 1910s to the 1930s.

== Career ==
McLean was born in Yonkers, New York. Like most golfers of his era, he worked primarily as a club pro while occasionally competing in PGA Tour events. He served at several clubs in New York state: Dunwoodie Golf Course in Yonkers, Great Neck Golf Club in Great Neck, Grassy Sprain Golf Club in Bronxville, and Seneca Falls Country Club in Seneca Falls.

McLean's best finishes at the PGA Championship were ties for third place (semi-finalist) in 1919, 1920, and 1923 while making six overall appearances. His best finish at the U.S. Open was a tie for fifth in 1919 while making eight cuts overall.

== Death ==
In 1951, McLean died in an auto accident.

== Professional wins (2) ==
=== PGA Tour wins (2) ===
- 1923 Westchester Open, Shawnee Open
