= Louis Tellier (golfer) =

French golfer

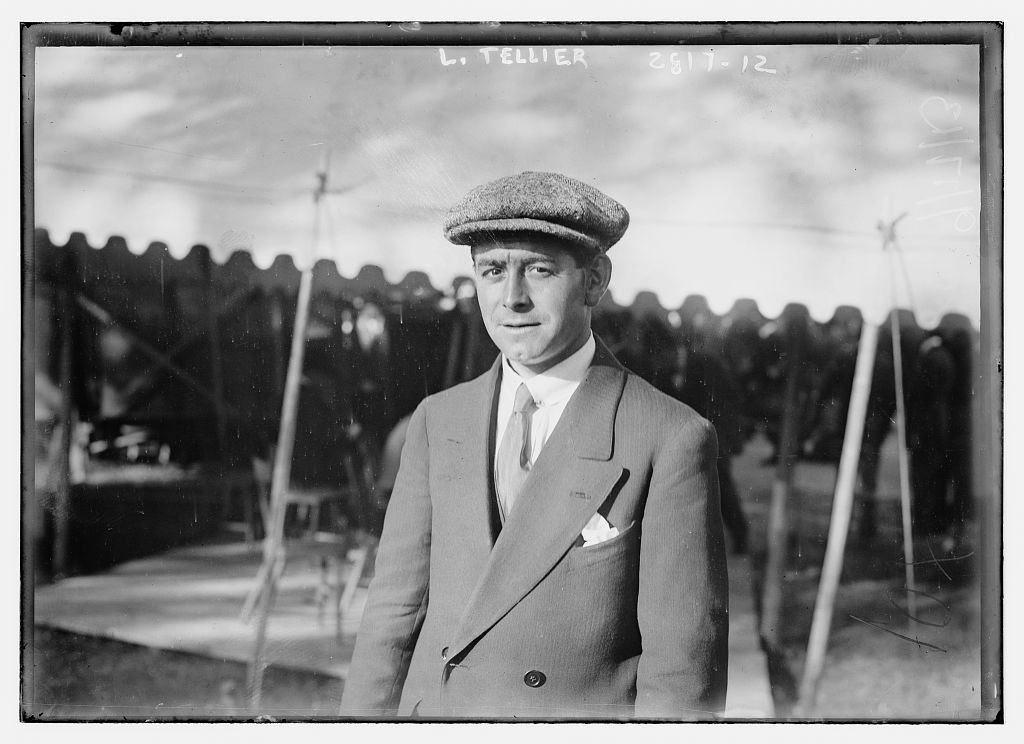
- Tellier at the 1913 U.S. Open

Personal information
- Full name: Louis Emile Auguste Tellier
- Nationality: France
- Born: 2 November 1886 France
- Died: 3 November 1921 (aged 35) West Newton, Massachusetts
- Height: 5 ft 4 in (1.63 m)
- Spouse: Elizabeth Ella Reid

Career
- Sport: Golf
- Status: Professional
- Former tour: PGA Tour
- Professional wins: 2

Number of wins by tour
- PGA Tour: 1

Best results in major championships
- PGA Championship: T5: 1920
- U.S. Open: T4: 1913, 1915
- The Open Championship: T22: 1913

Louis Emile Auguste Tellier (2 November 1886 – 3 November 1921) was a French professional golfer. He had five top-10 finishes in major championships.

== Golf career ==
Tellier came to the United States to play in the 1913 U.S. Open at The Country Club in Brookline, Massachusetts. He finished tied for fourth.

After a short return visit to France, Tellier returned to the U.S. in 1914 to become head professional at Canoe Brook Country Club in Summit, New Jersey. He moved to The Country Club, site of the 1913 U.S. Open, in 1916 and to Brae Burn Country Club in West Newton, Massachusetts in 1919.

Tellier's only significant win came at the 1921 Massachusetts Open a month before his death. He led the 1913 U.S. Open with seven holes to go, but faltered and finished in a tie for 4th. In 1915 he co-led the U.S. Open after two rounds, and finished 4th.

== Death ==
On 3 November 1921, Tellier committed suicide at Brae Burn Country Club in West Newton, Massachusetts. He was found hanging by a small rope in a shed on the golf course. The motive of the suicide was not known but family members told authorities that he had not been feeling well for quite some time. Fellow professional golfers Arthur Reid and Wilfrid Reid were Tellier's brothers-in-law.

== Professional wins (2) ==
=== PGA Tour wins (1) ===
- 1920 New England Pro Championship

=== Other wins (1) ===
- 1921 Massachusetts Open

== Results in major championships ==
Tournament	1911	1912	1913	1914	1915	1916	1917	1918	1919	1920	1921
U.S. Open			T4	8	T4	T13	NT	NT	T5	T38	T14
The Open Championship	CUT		T22		NT	NT	NT	NT	NT		
PGA Championship	NYF	NYF	NYF	NYF	NYF	R32	NT	NT	R32	QF	

Note: the Masters Tournament was not founded until 1934.

Top 10
Did not play

NYF = tournament not yet founded
NT = no tournament
CUT = missed the half-way cut
R32, R16, QF, SF = round in which player lost in PGA Championship match play
"T" indicates a tie for a place

== Team appearances ==
- France–United States Professional Match (representing France): 1913 (winners)
