= Clarence Hackney =

Scottish-American golfer (1894–1941)

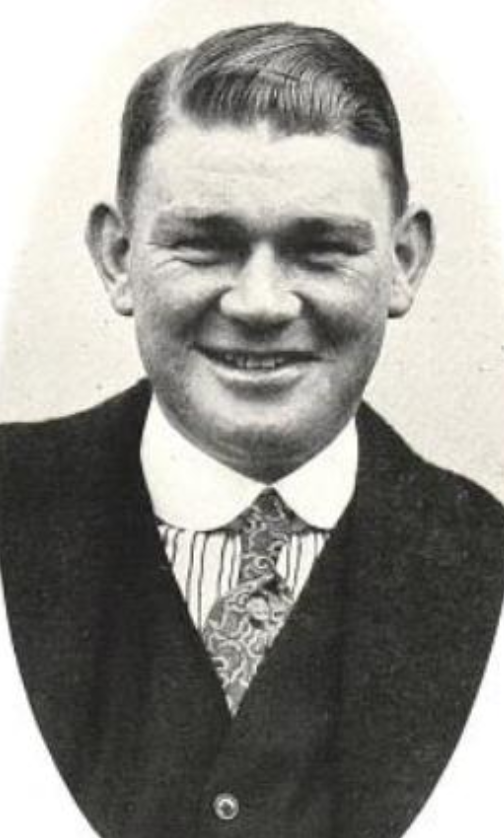
- Hackney, from a 1921 publication

Personal information
- Full name: Clarence W. Hackney
- Nationality: Scotland; United States
- Born: March 10, 1894 Carnoustie, Scotland
- Died: January 4, 1941 (aged 46) Morristown, New Jersey, U.S.
- Height: 5 ft 7 in (1.70 m)

Career
- Sport: Golf
- Status: Professional
- Former tour: PGA Tour
- Professional wins: 9

Number of wins by tour
- PGA Tour: 7
- Other: 2

Best results in major championships
- Masters Tournament: DNP
- PGA Championship: T5: 1920
- U.S. Open: T8: 1921
- The Open Championship: T23: 1921

Clarence W. Hackney (March 10, 1894 – January 4, 1941) was a Scottish-born professional golfer who played extensively in the United States.

== Career ==
Hackney was born in Carnoustie, Scotland. He emigrated to the United States in 1913 and became a U.S. citizen in 1921.

Hackney was the head professional at the Atlantic City Country Club from 1914 to 1940. Hackney won seven PGA Tour tournaments between 1923 and 1931, including the 1923 Canadian Open.

Hackney died in Morristown, New Jersey, on January 4, 1941.

== Professional wins (9) ==
=== PGA Tour wins (7) ===
- 1923 (2) Philadelphia Open Championship, Canadian Open
- 1924 (1) New Jersey State Open
- 1925 (1) New Jersey State Open
- 1926 (1) New Jersey State Open
- 1930 (1) Philadelphia Open Championship
- 1931 (1) Philadelphia Open Championship

=== Other wins (2) ===
- 1924 Philadelphia PGA Championship
- 1928 Philadelphia PGA Championship
