= James Douglas Edgar =

English professional golfer (1884–1921)

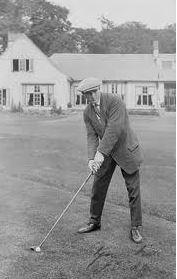
- Edgar preparing to hit a shot (c. 1910)

Personal information
- Full name: James Douglas Edgar
- Nationality: England
- Born: 30 September 1884 Newcastle upon Tyne, England
- Died: 8 August 1921 (aged 36) Atlanta, Georgia, U.S.

Career
- Sport: Golf
- Status: Professional
- Former tour: PGA Tour
- Professional wins: 4

Number of wins by tour
- PGA Tour: 3
- Other: 1

Best results in major championships
- Masters Tournament: NYF
- PGA Championship: 2nd: 1920
- U.S. Open: T20: 1920
- The Open Championship: T14: 1914

James Douglas Edgar (30 September 1884 – 8 August 1921) was an English professional golfer and golf writer.

== Career ==
In 1884, Edgar was born in Newcastle upon Tyne, England. He won the French Open in 1914. He coached the young player Tommy Armour, who became a prominent professional after 1920; Armour later praised Edgar as having helped him the most. The legendary Harry Vardon stated that Edgar was on his way to becoming a player who could surpass everyone.

Edgar emigrated to the United States in April 1919, following World War I. He was the head professional at Druid Hills Golf Club in Atlanta. Edgar played frequently with the young Bobby Jones at the Atlanta Athletic Club (the site of today's East Lake Golf Club) from 1919 to 1921. He mentored and coached Jones during this period as well. Jones developed into one of the dominant golfers of the 1920s. Edgar was a friend of Alexa Stirling and gave her golf lessons while he was the professional at Druid Hills.

Edgar won the Canadian Open in 1919 at the Hamilton Golf and Country Club by a record 16 strokes (a winning margin which still stands for a PGA Tour event), with Jones and Jim Barnes tying for second, and came back the next year to win that title again. He lost the 1920 PGA Championship, one of golf's majors, in a match play final to Jock Hutchison. During 1919–20, Edgar was among the top players in the world.

Edgar wrote a golf book entitled The Gate to Golf, based on his discoveries made in England. Edgar had an ailing hip which he could not turn freely. Through experimentation, he found that a restricted hip turn still allowed a repeatable swing with excellent power and control. This book proved to have significant impact on golf instruction, right up to the present time.

== Death ==
Edgar's death was mysterious. He was found late at night on an Atlanta street, bleeding heavily from a deep wound in his leg, and died in the street before any trained help could arrive. The case was turned over to police but never solved. He left a wife and two children in England. In an article published in Sports Illustrated in April 2010, writer Steve Eubanks wrote that Edgar was having an affair with a married Atlanta woman, and that this likely played a central role in Edgar's death. Eubanks' article was an excerpt from his book To Win and Die in Dixie, a biography of Edgar published later that year. Edgar was buried in Westview Cemetery in Atlanta.

== Tournament wins (4) ==
=== PGA Tour wins (3) ===
- 1919 Canadian Open
- 1920 Canadian Open, Southern Open

=== Other wins (1) ===
this list may be incomplete

- 1914 French Open

== Results in major championships ==
Tournament	1904	1905	1906	1907	1908	1909	1910	1911	1912	1913	1914	1915	1916	1917	1918	1919	1920	1921
U.S. Open														NT	NT	T21	T20	
The Open Championship	CUT	CUT	43	T50		T26	T38	T47	T20	T39	T14	NT	NT	NT	NT	NT		T26
PGA Championship	NYF	NYF	NYF	NYF	NYF	NYF	NYF	NYF	NYF	NYF	NYF	NYF		NT	NT	QF	2	

Note: The Masters Tournament was not founded until 1934.

Top 10
Did not play

NYF = tournament not yet founded
NT = no tournament
CUT = missed the half-way cut
QF, SF = round in which player lost in PGA Championship match play
"T" indicates a tie for a place

== See also ==
- List of unsolved murders (1900–1979)

== Books ==
- Elliott, Len; Kelly, Barbara (1976). Who's Who in Golf. New Rochelle, New York: Arlington House. p. 57. ISBN 0-87000-225-2.
