= Emmet French =

American professional golfer (1886–1947)

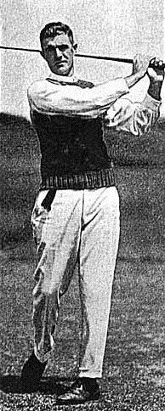
- French, c. 1919

Personal information
- Full name: John Emmet French
- Nationality: United States
- Born: November 22, 1886 Bryn Mawr, Pennsylvania, U.S.
- Died: June 10, 1947 (aged 60) Bryn Mawr, Pennsylvania, U.S.
- Height: 5 ft 11.75 in (1.82 m)

Career
- Sport: Golf
- Status: Professional
- Former tour: PGA Tour
- Professional wins: 4

Number of wins by tour
- PGA Tour: 3
- Other: 1

Best results in major championships
- Masters Tournament: WD: 1934
- PGA Championship: 2nd: 1922
- U.S. Open: 4th: 1927
- The Open Championship: T8: 1926

John Emmet French (November 22, 1886 – June 10, 1947) was an American professional golfer.

== Career ==
French was born in Bryn Mawr, Pennsylvania. French, being a tall man, was a good iron player. He was known for playing entire rounds and matches without ever using a wooden club.

French is notable for losing to Gene Sarazen in the 1922 PGA Championship.

French won three PGA events.

== Professional wins (4) ==
=== PGA Tour wins (3) ===
- 1919 Philadelphia Open Championship
- 1924 Pennsylvania Open Championship, Ohio Open

=== Other wins ===
Note: This list may be incomplete

- 1926 Philadelphia Open Championship

== Results in major championships ==
Tournament	1915	1916	1917	1918	1919
U.S. Open	T10		NT	NT	T34
The Open Championship	NT	NT	NT	NT	NT
PGA Championship	NYF	R16	NT	NT	QF

Tournament	1920	1921	1922	1923	1924	1925	1926	1927	1928	1929
U.S. Open		T5	T19	22	T22	T20	T27	4	T31	T51
The Open Championship		T26					T8			
PGA Championship		SF	2		QF	R32				

Tournament	1930	1931	1932	1933	1934
Masters Tournament	NYF	NYF	NYF	NYF	WD
U.S. Open	WD				
The Open Championship					
PGA Championship					

Top 10
Did not play

NYF = tournament not yet founded
NT = no tournament
WD = withdrew
R32, R16, QF, SF = round in which player lost in PGA Championship match play
"T" indicates a tie for a place

=== Summary ===
Tournament	Wins	2nd	3rd	Top-5	Top-10	Top-25	Events	Cuts made
Masters Tournament	0	0	0	0	0	0	1	0
U.S. Open	0	0	0	2	3	7	12	11
The Open Championship	0	0	0	0	1	1	2	2
PGA Championship	0	1	1	4	5	6	6	6
Totals	0	1	1	6	9	14	21	19

- Most consecutive cuts made – 19 (1915 U.S. Open – 1929 U.S. Open)
- Longest streak of top-10s – 2 (twice)

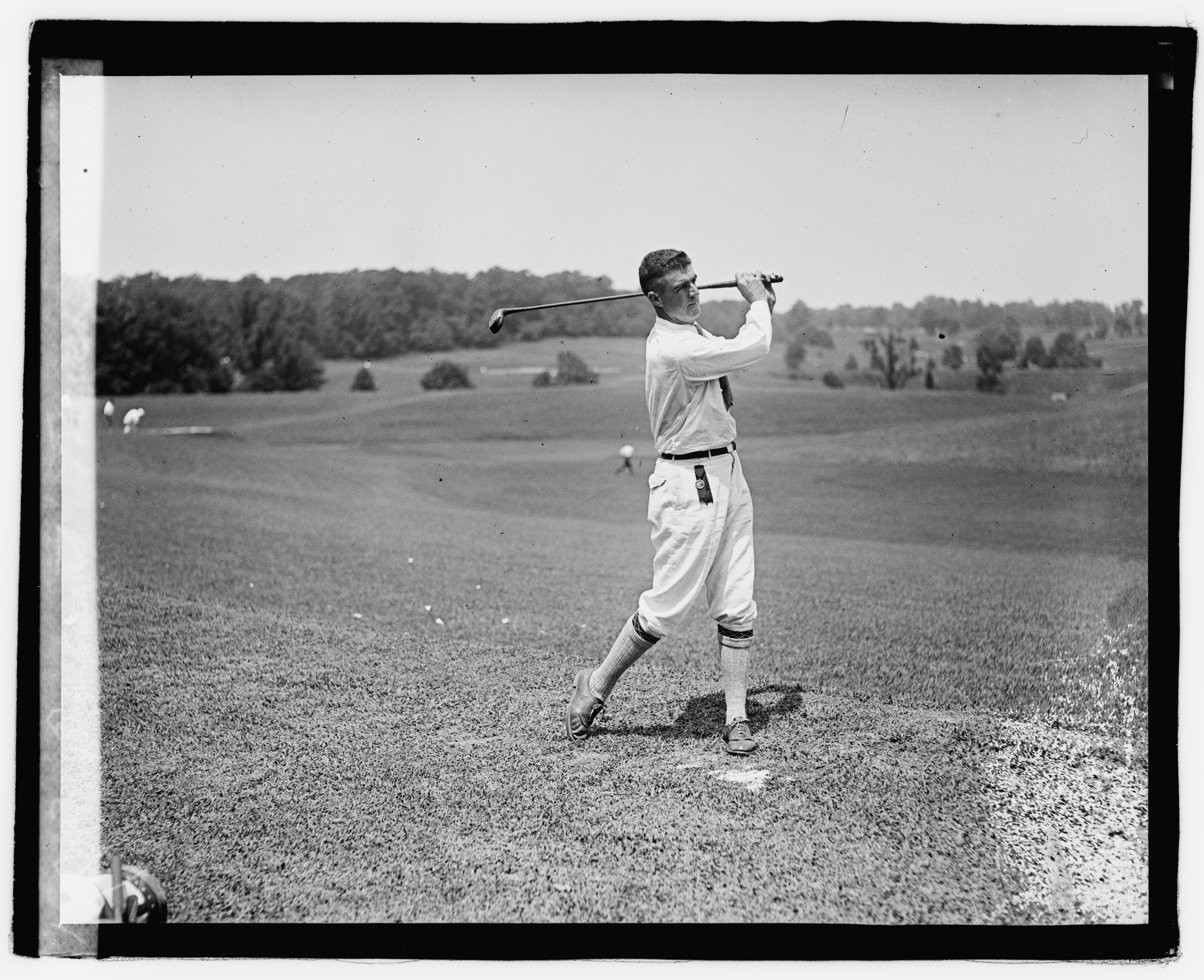
In 1921
