= George Von Elm =

American professional golfer (1901–1961)

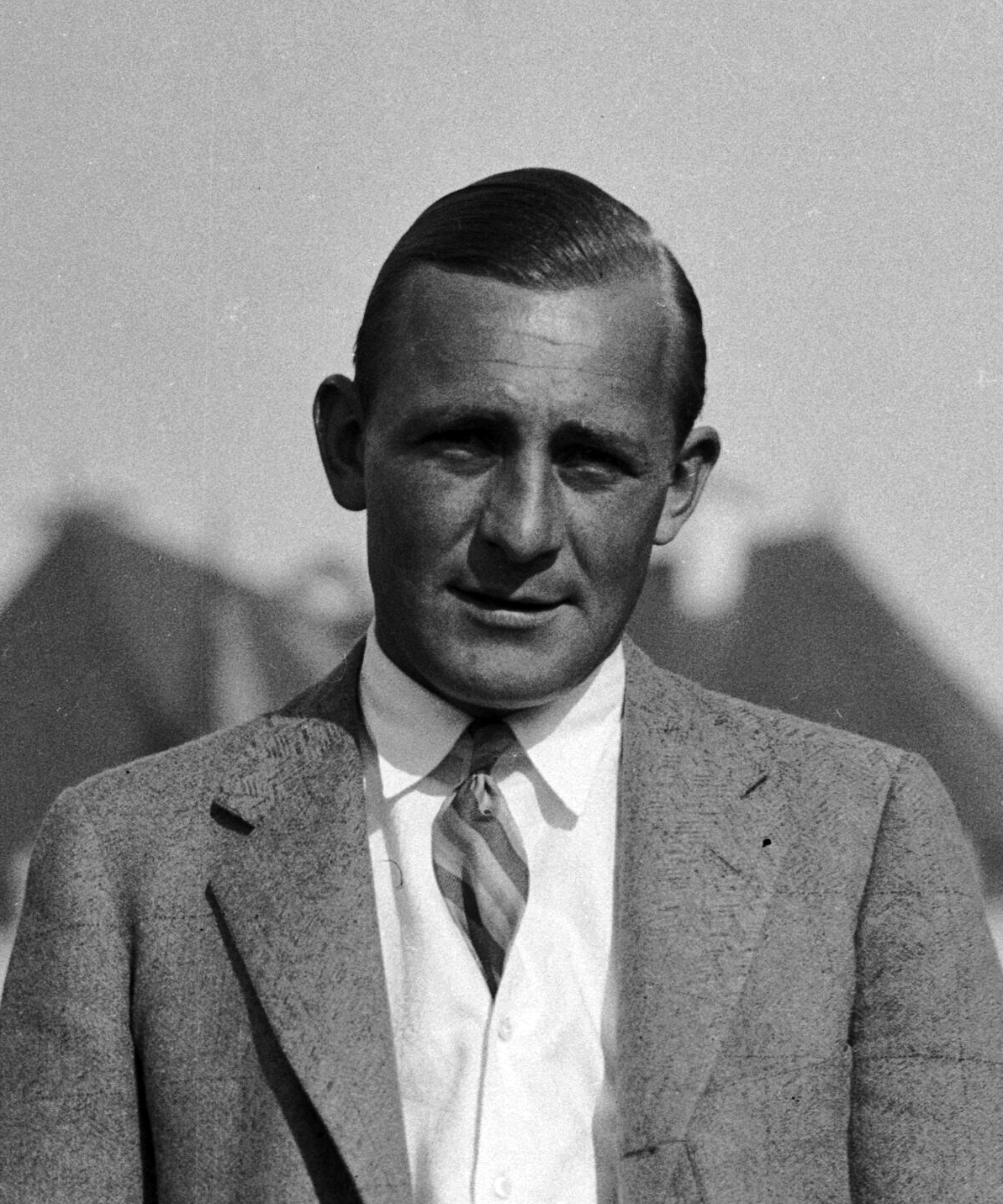

Personal information
- Nickname: Gix
- Nationality: United States
- Born: March 20, 1901 Salt Lake City, Utah, U.S.
- Died: May 1, 1961 (aged 60) Pocatello, Idaho, U.S.
- Height: 6 ft 0 in (1.83 m)
- Weight: 170 lb (77 kg; 12 st)
- Spouses: Marcella Rogers Von Elm (1902–1945); Mary (d. 1954); Billie Dunn (m. 1957)

Career
- Sport: Golf
- College: University of Utah
- Turned professional: 1930
- Former tour: PGA Tour
- Professional wins: 6

Number of wins by tour
- PGA Tour: 5
- Other: 1

Best results in major championships (wins: 1)
- Masters Tournament: T50: 1951
- PGA Championship: DNP
- U.S. Open: 2nd: 1931
- The Open Championship: T3: 1926
- U.S. Amateur: Won: 1926
- British Amateur: T17: 1930

Achievements and awards
- Southern California Golf Hall of Fame: 2007

George "Gix" Von Elm (March 20, 1901 – May 1, 1961) was an American professional golfer most noted for his amateur career. He was selected by Golf Digest as Utah's greatest amateur golfer, and in the early 1960s was named Utah Golfer of the Century.

From 1924 to 1931, Von Elm was among the best players in the world. In the 1920s, he worked primarily in the financial and insurance industries, and later designed several golf courses.

== Early life ==
Born in Salt Lake City to Jacob H. and Marie Demmer Von Elm, he began his golf career as a caddie on the old Salt Lake Country Club course, where he was coached by professionals Louis Berrien and Willie Lock. He later refined his game at the Forest Dale Golf Course.

Von Elm attended West High School, where he was an outstanding athlete and played quarterback on the football team. While a 16-year-old high school senior, he won the first of many tournaments, the 1917 Utah Amateur. He won the Utah Amateur again in 1920 and 1921. His golf skills developed quickly, and soon he was seeking competition outside the state. Von Elm attended the University of Utah in Salt Lake City, studying business, and developed his career in insurance and investments.

== Amateur career ==
In 1921, Von Elm won the Pacific Northwest Men's Amateur in a final round that pitted the young Utahn against veteran Chandler Egan in what was described by the Salt Lake Tribune as "one of the most sensational matches in the history of northwest golf." He repeated as winner of that tournament the following year. He captured the 1920 Trans-Mississippi Amateur title, and lost in the finals of that event the next year.

Von Elm settled in the Los Angeles area in the early 1920s, but moved back to Utah shortly afterwards, taking a job in a bank. He was suspended by the United States Golf Association from amateur competition for one year, in late 1921, for accepting golf tournament expense money from friends who were Utah golf club members; this was against the rules. Another element of this suspension was his association with the golf manufacturer Spalding, which was against the rules at that time; Von Elm worked as an assistant mining engineer in Colorado for a time.

After serving his suspension, and returning to the Los Angeles area, he joined the Rancho Golf Club, at that time a private facility, and was coached there by pro Arthur Clarkson. He successfully represented Rancho in interclub matches, leading to several team titles in southern California, and won many of the prestigious club invitational titles in the region. Von Elm often played exhibitions and team matches with 1921 British Amateur champion Willie Hunter, also a Rancho member and the club secretary. As his fame grew, he was invited to join such legends as Walter Hagen and Tommy Armour for exhibition and challenge matches, raising significant sums for charity; as an amateur, Von Elm could not accept prize money from these events.

photograph of Von Elm, circa 1926

Von Elm won the Southern California Amateur three times: 1922, 1925, and 1927. This is a prestigious event which always attracts a strong field. Von Elm won the 1925 Northern California Amateur title, and the 1925 California State Amateur (played at Pebble Beach Golf Links). In 1925 he became the first to win all three major California amateur titles in the same year; this feat has not been repeated since. He finished runner-up in the first Los Angeles Open, held in 1926; this famous tournament is one of the PGA Tour's longest-running events.

In the 1920s amateur golf was in its heyday, with famous players such as Bobby Jones, Chick Evans, and Francis Ouimet. Von Elm's duels with Jones became legendary. In 1923 Von Elm advanced to the quarter-finals of the U.S. Amateur, but lost to former champion Ouimet. In 1924 Von Elm surprised the top golfers by finishing the U.S. Amateur as runner-up to Jones, though Jones won the final match at the Merion Golf Club by a resounding 9 and 8 margin. Von Elm became the first player from west of the Mississippi River to reach the final. The following year Jones eliminated Von Elm in the semifinals, at the Oakmont Country Club. But Von Elm persisted, and in 1926 succeeded in defeating Jones, who had already won the British Open and the U.S. Open that year, to collect the U.S. Amateur title in September at the Baltusrol Golf Club in northeastern New Jersey. A record-breaking crowd of 10,000 erupted with cheers as, in the words of an Associated Press reporter, "The monarch of golf was toppled from his amateur throne...by flaxen-haired George Von Elm...in one of the most stunning upsets of links history." Von Elm, who became the first champion from west of the Mississippi River, was presented with a new car by members of the Rancho Park Golf Course, his home club, upon his return to Los Angeles following the Amateur victory; Jones received a similar gift from Sarasota, Florida golfers that same year, following his wins in the two major Opens.

The win in the national championship capped a superb golf year for Von Elm. Earlier he had played a key role in the American defeat of the British in Walker Cup competition, by halving the final and decisive match over the Old Course at St Andrews, and had tied for third place in the British Open with the famous professional Walter Hagen at Royal Lytham & St Annes Golf Club. Von Elm made two more appearances for his country in the Walker Cup, in 1928 (Chicago Golf Club) and 1930 (Royal St George's Golf Club); he was on the winning U.S. team all three times.

Von Elm lost the longest playoff in the history of the U.S. Amateur when in 1930, he went ten sudden-death, extra holes with Maurice McCarthy Jr. (son of the golf architect and professional of the same name (Metropolitan Amateur champion 1929–30 and 1928 NCAA champion)) at Merion Golf Club, before eventually losing. Von Elm and McCarthy had tied at the end of their regulation 18-hole match.

Von Elm's most sensational result was as runner-up to pro Billy Burke in the 1931 U.S. Open at the Inverness Club in Toledo, Ohio. After tying Burke with a birdie on the 72nd and final hole of regulation, he competed the next day in a 36-hole playoff, again tying with a birdie on the last hole. This set up a second 36-hole playoff the next day, which Burke won by a stroke. The 72 total holes remains the longest playoff in the history of golf. Burke's victory was the first achieved in a major championship using steel-shafted clubs. Steel shafts had been legalized in the U.S. beginning in 1924. Von Elm had used his normal hickory-shafted clubs in this championship, and complained afterwards that the true essence of the sport of golf was being diminished by the new shaft technology, which took away from traditional shotmaking talent, and made missed shots significantly less penalizing. However, steel shafts were much cheaper and were easier to replace, making the sport much more accessible for a greater range of the population.

Von Elm ran a successful non-golf business, selling insurance and investments, which generated enough income to fund his amateur golf career during the 1920s. Von Elm stated in 1930, when he turned professional immediately following the U.S. Amateur, that it had cost him an average of $10,000 per year to play his extensive amateur golf schedule; being based in California raised his expenses significantly, since most important American events were held in the East during this era. Von Elm stated that the 1929 stock market crash hurt his business success, and led to his decision to become a businessman golfer the next year, thereby leaving amateur competition, but he retained his business interests.

Although some published sources have indicated a firm friendship between Von Elm and Jones, Von Elm (along with another rival, Chick Evans), had no more than grudging respect for Jones, and in fact resented Jones (for his apparent use of plentiful family money for tournament golf; Jones' father, Robert P. Jones, was a prosperous Atlanta lawyer, while his grandfather, Robert Tyre Jones Sr., was a wealthy Georgia businessman, but it remains unclear how much Jones' relatives assisted with his golf expenses), and questioned his amateur status. Von Elm claimed, without providing proof, that Jones had accepted money for golf films before winning the 1930 U.S. Amateur title in September 1930; Jones did sign a lucrative contract with Warner Brothers to make the films in Hollywood, but this came in November 1930, some two months later, at the same time that he renounced his amateur status. One letter, from after Von Elm's death in 1961, indicated the depth of Von Elm's hatred.

== Professional career ==
Von Elm turned professional in September 1930, calling himself a 'businessman golfer', and made a career out of his athletic prowess. This was an unusual designation, not followed by any other top amateur players. This declaration made him ineligible for amateur events, including the U.S. Amateur Championship, from that point forward, since accepting money from tournament results ends a player's amateur status.

As a professional, he played out of the Los Angeles area, and won some big-money tournaments, including the 1936 Southern California Open and the 1938 California State Open. The latter event was classified as an official PGA Tour event during the 1920s and 1930s.

Von Elm also remained in the financial services industry, but business became difficult due to the Great Depression.

For his record in PGA Tour events, Von Elm is officially credited with five victories, eight second-place finishes, and five third-place finishes, along with 37 finishes in the top ten and 55 finishes in the top 25.

Von Elm moved to the Lakeside Golf Club in the late 1930s, after the Internal Revenue Service shut down the original Rancho club. He oversaw the reconstruction of five holes at Lakeside following damage caused by flooding in 1939. In the late 1940s, he consulted to the City of Los Angeles, in the development of an entirely new Rancho club—this time called Rancho Park Golf Course—which became a municipal facility; it was designed and built from scratch by William P. Bell and William Johnson.

Von Elm was invited to the Masters Tournament by his great amateur rival Jones in 1951, well past his playing peak, but a significant honor. In 1952, he was named the tenth most important amateur golfer in U.S. history, by a panel of PGA members and sportswriters, marking the half-century list.

From 1950 to 1953, he was the head professional, as well as the head greenskeeper, at the Hacienda CC in California, then moved back to Utah. From 1957 to 1960, he was the professional in eastern Idaho at the golf course in Blackfoot, which he designed and helped to construct during this period. Later he moved to nearby Pocatello, where he directed the design and construction of golf courses in adjacent Alameda and at the Sun Valley resort near Ketchum. According to the important golf course design reference The Golf Course, written by Geoffrey Cornish and Ronald Whitten in 1981, Von Elm is credited with designing the Airport GC in Idaho (1957) and the Mount Ogden municipal course in Utah, the original nine holes at Sun Valley in Idaho, and with remodeling the Hacienda Country Club in California. He is credited with developing the Shadow Mountain club in Palm Springs, California, as well as the Juniper Hills and Highland courses in Idaho.

== Personal life ==
Von Elm was married three times: Marcella Rodgers (1902–1945), Mary (d.1954), and Billie Dunn (m. 1957). He suffered a severe illness due to an ulcer in 1953, but recovered; he moved back to Utah after this, leaving his job at the Hacienda Club and later lived in eastern Idaho at Blackfoot. Suffering from lung cancer, he died in Pocatello on May 1, 1961.

Two George Von Elm Memorial golf tournaments are played in his honor. From 1962, the Memorial event at the Blackfoot GC in Idaho has been played annually, while the Rancho Park Golf Course, now a municipal facility, in Los Angeles also holds an annual Memorial event named for him.

== Awards and honors ==
- Von Elm was inducted in the Charter Class of the Utah Golf Hall of Fame in 1990.
- He was inducted in 2007 in the inaugural class to the Southern California Golf Hall of Fame.

== Amateur wins ==
this list may be incomplete

- 1917 Utah Amateur
- 1920 Trans-Mississippi Amateur, Utah Amateur
- 1921 Pacific Northwest Amateur, Utah Amateur
- 1922 Pacific Northwest Amateur, Southern California Amateur
- 1925 Southern California Amateur, Northern California Amateur, California State Amateur, Hillcrest C.C. Invitational
- 1926 **U.S. Amateur**
- 1927 Southern California Amateur
- 1928 Gold Mashie Tournament
- 1930 French Open Amateur Championship

Major championship shown in bold.

== Professional wins (6) ==
=== PGA Tour wins (5) ===
- 1925 Southern California Open (as an amateur)
- 1928 Michigan Open (as an amateur)
- 1930 La Jolla Open
- 1932 Santa Monica Amateur-Pro
- 1938 California State Open

=== Other wins (1) ===
this list may be incomplete

- 1936 Southern California Open

== Major championships ==
=== Amateur wins (1) ===
Year	Championship	Winning score	Runner-up
1926	U.S. Amateur	2 & 1	(United States) Bobby Jones

=== Results timeline ===
Amateur

Tournament	1921	1922	1923	1924	1925	1926	1927	1928	1929	1930
U.S. Open						CUT		T4	T5	T11
The Open Championship						T3			T45	CUT
U.S. Amateur	R32		QF	2	SF	**1**	R16	R32	R32	R16
The Amateur Championship						R128				R32

Professional

Tournament	1931	1932	1933	1934	1935	1936	1937	1938	1939
Masters Tournament	NYF	NYF	NYF						
U.S. Open	2	T27	CUT	T28	T55			T11	T59

Tournament	1940	1941	1942	1943	1944	1945	1946	1947	1948	1949	1950	1951
Masters Tournament				NT	NT	NT						T50
U.S. Open		WD	NT	NT	NT	NT			CUT			

Note: Von Elm did not play The Open Championship (as a professional) or the PGA Championship.

Win
Top 10
Did not play

NYF = Tournament not yet founded
NT = No tournament
CUT = missed the half-way cut
R128, R64, R32, R16, QF, SF = Round in which player lost in match play
"T" indicates a tie for a place

== U.S. national team appearances ==
Amateur

- Walker Cup: 1926 (winners), 1928 (winners), 1930 (winners)

== General references ==
- Source for U.S. Open & U.S. Amateur: USGA Championship Database
- Source for 1926 British Open: www.opengolf.com
- Source for 1926 British Amateur: The American Golfer, July, 1926, pg. 58.
- Source for 1929 British Open: www.opengolf.com
- Source for 1930 British Open: www.opengolf.com
- Source for 1930 British Amateur: The Glasgow Herald, May 30, 1930, pg. 13.
- Source for 1951 Masters: www.masters.com
