= 1931 U.S. Open (golf) =

Coordinates: 41.652°N 83.651°W

Tournament information
- Dates: July 2–6, 1931
- Location: Toledo, Ohio
- Course: Inverness Club
- Organized by: USGA
- Tour: PGA Tour
- Format: Stroke play − 72 holes

Statistics
- Par: 71
- Length: 6,529 yards (5,970 m)
- Field: 144 players, 62 after cut
- Cut: 158 (+16)
- Prize fund: $6,000
- Winner's share: $1,750 (incl. $750 playoff bonus)

Champion
- (United States) Billy Burke
- 292 (+8), playoff

Location in the United States
Location in Ohio

The 1931 U.S. Open was the 35th U.S. Open, held July 2–6 at Inverness Club in Toledo, Ohio. Billy Burke won his only major title, defeating George Von Elm in a marathon 72-hole playoff, the longest in tournament history.

Von Elm, the 1926 U.S. Amateur champion, held the 54-hole lead at 217 after rounds of 75-69-73. Burke, playing just ahead of Von Elm in the final round, carded a 73 and a 292 total. Von Elm bogeyed 12, 14, 15, and 16, and needed a birdie at 18 to force a 36-hole playoff on Sunday.

In the playoff, Von Elm and Burke were still tied after 36 holes, with Von Elm making a birdie on the 36th to extend it. In the era prior to sudden-death, 36-hole playoffs were required to break ties, so another was held the following day.

In the morning round, Von Elm shot a 76 and led by a stroke, but Burke took the lead late in the afternoon round at the 32nd and extended it to two strokes at the 34th. A bogey on the final hole narrowed Burke's victory margin to one stroke, 148 to Von Elm's 149. Burke reportedly smoked 32 cigars during the tournament, and quipped afterwards: "George Von Elm lost 15 pounds (7 kg). I gained three."

Following this tournament, the USGA reduced the length of all future playoffs to 18 holes, which remained the format until 2018. A second playoff round was played in 1939 and 1946. Sudden-death after 18 holes was added in the 1950s, but was not needed until 1990, and was used again 1994 and 2008.

Leo Diegel made a hole-in-one during the second round, only the third in U.S. Open history and first since 1922. He missed the playoff by two strokes and finished in third place. Low-amateur went to Philip Perkins, who finished in a tie for seventh. Three-time British Open champion Henry Cotton played the first of two U.S. Open appearances this year, missing the cut. Defending champion Bobby Jones retired from competition in 1930 and did not compete.

This was the second U.S. Open at Inverness, which hosted eleven years earlier in 1920. It later hosted in 1957 and 1979, and the PGA Championship in 1986 and 1993.

== Course layout ==
Hole	1	2	3	4	5	6	7	8	9	Out	10	11	12	13	14	15	16	17	18	In	Total
Yards	392	388	146	431	430	350	316	210	492	3,155	348	380	516	146	416	441	398	404	325	3,374	6,529
Par	4	4	3	4	4	4	4	3	5	35	4	4	5	3	4	4	4	4	4	36	71

== Round summaries ==
=== First round ===
Thursday, July 2, 1931

Place	Player	Score	To par
T1	(United States) Herman Barron	71	E
T1	(United States) Mortie Dutra	71	E
T1	(United States) Charles Guest	71	E
T1	(United States) Eddie Williams	71	E
5	(United States) Al Espinosa	72	+1
T6	(United States) Billy Burke	73	+2
T6	(United States) Henry Ciuci	73	+2
T6	(England) Bill Davies	73	+2
T6	(United States) Guy Paulsen	73	+2
T6	(England) Fred Robson	73	+2
T6	(United States) Joe Turnesa	73	+2
T6	(United States) Frank Walsh	73	+2

=== Second round ===
Friday, July 3, 1931

Place	Player	Score	To par
1	(United States) George Von Elm	75-69=144	+2
T2	(United States) Billy Burke	73-72=145	+3
T2	(United States) Eddie Williams	71-74=145	+3
T4	(United States) Herman Barron	71-75=146	+4
T4	(United States) Charles Guest	71-75=146	+4
T4	(United States) Guy Paulsen	74-72=146	+4
T4	(United States) Macdonald Smith	73-73=146	+4
T8	(United States) Leo Diegel	75-73=148	+6
T8	(United States) Mortie Dutra	71-77=148	+6
T8	(United States) Johnny Farrell	78-70=148	+6
T8	(United States) Walter Hagen	74-74=148	+6
T8	(United States) Joe Turnesa	73-75=148	+6

=== Third round ===
Saturday, July 4, 1931 (morning)

Place	Player	Score	To par
1	(United States) George Von Elm	75-69-73=217	+4
2	(United States) Billy Burke	73-72-74=219	+6
3	(United States) Guy Paulsen	74-72-74=220	+7
T4	(United States) Mortie Dutra	71-77-73=221	+8
T4	(United States) Walter Hagen	74-74-73=221	+8
T4	(United States) Macdonald Smith	73-73-75=221	+8
T7	(United States) Leo Diegel	75-73-74=222	+9
T7	(United States) Charles Guest	71-75-76=222	+9
T9	(United States) Wiffy Cox	76-74-74=224	+11
T9	(United States) Herman Barron	71-75-78=224	+11

=== Final round ===
Saturday, July 4, 1931 (afternoon)

Place	Player	Score	To par	Money ($)
T1	(United States) Billy Burke	73-72-74-73=292	+8	Playoff
T1	(United States) George Von Elm	75-69-73-75=292	+8	Playoff
3	(United States) Leo Diegel	75-73-74-72=294	+10	650
T4	(United States) Wiffy Cox	76-74-74-72=296	+12	450
T4	(United States) Bill Mehlhorn	77-73-75-71=296	+12	450
T4	(United States) Gene Sarazen	74-78-74-70=296	+12	450
T7	(United States) Mortie Dutra	71-77-73-76=297	+13	200
T7	(United States) Walter Hagen	74-74-73-76=297	+13	200
T7	(England) Philip Perkins (a)	78-76-73-70=297	+13	0
T10	(United States) Al Espinosa	72-78-75-74=299	+15	105
T10	(United States) Johnny Farrell	78-70-79-72=299	+15	105
T10	(United States) Macdonald Smith	73-73-75-78=299	+15	105

(a) denotes amateur

==== Scorecard ====
Final round

Hole	1	2	3	4	5	6	7	8	9	10	11	12	13	14	15	16	17	18
Par	4	4	3	4	4	4	4	3	5	4	4	5	3	4	4	4	4	4
(United States) Burke	+7	+7	+7	+8	+8	+8	+8	+7	+7	+7	+7	+7	+7	+8	+8	+8	+8	+8
(United States) Von Elm	+3	+3	+3	+4	+5	+5	+5	+5	+5	+5	+5	+6	+6	+7	+8	+9	+9	+8

Cumulative tournament scores, relative to par

Birdie	Bogey

== Playoff ==
=== First playoff ===
Sunday, July 5, 1931

Player	Score	To par
(United States) Billy Burke	73-76=149	+7
(United States) George Von Elm	75-74=149	+7

==== Scorecards ====
Morning round

Hole	1	2	3	4	5	6	7	8	9	10	11	12	13	14	15	16	17	18
Par	4	4	3	4	4	4	4	3	5	4	4	5	3	4	4	4	4	4
(United States) Burke	E	+1	+2	+2	+2	+2	+1	+1	E	+1	+1	E	E	E	E	E	+1	+2
(United States) Von Elm	E	-1	E	+2	+4	+4	+3	+3	+3	+3	+3	+2	+3	+3	+3	+4	+4	+4

Afternoon round

Hole	1	2	3	4	5	6	7	8	9	10	11	12	13	14	15	16	17	18
Par	4	4	3	4	4	4	4	3	5	4	4	5	3	4	4	4	4	4
(United States) Burke	+3	+3	+4	+5	+5	+6	+7	+8	+7	+7	+7	+7	+7	+6	+7	+7	+7	+7
(United States) Von Elm	+4	+6	+7	+7	+9	+8	+7	+6	+5	+6	+6	+6	+6	+6	+8	+8	+8	+7

Cumulative playoff scores, relative to par

Birdie	Bogey	Double bogey

=== Second playoff ===
Monday, July 6, 1931

Place	Player	Score	To par	Money ($)
1	(United States) Billy Burke	77-71=148	+6	1,750
2	(United States) George Von Elm	76-73=149	+7	1,000

- Playoff bonus is included: $750 to champion, $250 to runner-up

==== Scorecards ====
Morning round

Hole	1	2	3	4	5	6	7	8	9	10	11	12	13	14	15	16	17	18
Par	4	4	3	4	4	4	4	3	5	4	4	5	3	4	4	4	4	4
(United States) Burke	+1	+3	+3	+3	+3	+3	+2	+3	+2	+2	+2	+3	+3	+3	+5	+4	+5	+6
(United States) Von Elm	E	E	E	+1	+1	+1	+2	+3	+3	+4	+3	+3	+5	+5	+5	+5	+5	+5

Afternoon round

Hole	1	2	3	4	5	6	7	8	9	10	11	12	13	14	15	16	17	18
Par	4	4	3	4	4	4	4	3	5	4	4	5	3	4	4	4	4	4
(United States) Burke	+6	+5	+5	+4	+5	+5	+6	+5	+5	+5	+5	+4	+5	+5	+5	+5	+5	+6
(United States) Von Elm	+5	+5	+5	+6	+6	+6	+6	+7	+6	+5	+5	+5	+5	+6	+6	+7	+7	+7
