= Arizona Open =

Golf tournament

Arizona Open Championship

Tournament information
- Location: Phoenix, Arizona in 2026
- Established: 1937
- Courses: Papago Golf Club in 2026
- Par: 70
- Length: 7295 Yards
- Organized by: Southwest PGA
- Format: Stroke play

Current champion
- Cody Massa (a)

The Arizona Open Championship is the annual open state championship of golf in Arizona. The competition is 54-holes of stroke play (3 rounds on an 18-hole course), with the winner being the player with the lowest total number of strokes. Following 36-holes of play the field is cut to the top 50 players and ties for the final round. In the event of a tie following 54-holes, a hole-by-hole, sudden death playoff will determine the winner. The Championship is administered by the Southwest PGA (Professional Golfers' Association of America). The Arizona Open has roots dating back to the inaugural event held in 1937. This historical championship has been held annually since 1953 and boasts an impressive list of past champions including Johnny Bulla, Dale Douglas and Curt Byrum.

== Qualification ==
The Arizona Open Championship is open to any professional golfer or to any amateur golfer with a USGA Handicap Index not exceeding 10.0. Players (male or female) may obtain a place in the Championship proper by being fully exempt or by competing successfully in qualifying. Approximately 1/3 of the field is made up of players who are fully exempt from qualifying. Competitors who are not fully exempt must register and compete in a qualifier. Place-winners from qualifying events, conducted historically throughout the month of July, along with those players exempt from qualifying, finalize the Championship field of 156 competitors.

== Champions ==
Year	Champion	Venue	Location	Score	Margin	Runner(s)-up	Low amateur
2026	Cody Massa (a)	Papago Golf Club	Phoenix, Arizona	197 (−13)	4 strokes	Mark Baldwin; Ethan Butters (a); Jim Knous; Trevor Lewis	Cody Massa
2025	Michael Herrera	Papago Golf Club	Phoenix, Arizona	196 (−14)	2 strokes	Mark Baldwin	Johnnie Clark
2024	Michael Feagles	Papago Golf Club	Phoenix, Arizona	196 (−14)	1 stroke	Mark Baldwin	Asher Nelson
2023	Grant Booth	Mesa Country Club	Mesa, Arizona	191 (−19)	7 strokes	Jake Younan	Nicky Kling
2022	Nicolo Gallatti	Mesa Country Club	Mesa, Arizona	198 (−12)	1 stroke	Charlie Beljan; Grant Booth	Gavin Aurilia
2021	Jhared Hack	Superstition Mountain Golf & C.C. (Prospector)	Gold Canyon, Arizona	195 (−15)	3 strokes	Inigo Izuzquiza (a); Patrick Stolpe	Inigo Izuzquiza
2020	Yannik Paul	Superstition Mountain Golf & C.C. (Prospector)	Gold Canyon, Arizona	198 (−18)	2 strokes	Blake Cannon; Caleb Ramirez	Branden Meyer
2019	Charlie Beljan	Superstition Mountain Golf & C.C. (Prospector)	Gold Canyon, Arizona	200 (−16)	1 stroke	Zach Smith	Michael Feagles
2018	Jake Younan	Troon Country Club	Scottsdale, Arizona	198 (−12)	5 strokes	Charlie Beljan; Jesse Mueller	Brandon Smith
2017	Calum Hill	Troon Country Club	Scottsdale, Arizona	200 (−10)	4 strokes	Brian Cooper	Matt McClung
2016	Brian Cooper	Troon Country Club	Scottsdale, Arizona	202 (−8)^{PO}	Playoff	Craig Hocknull	Ken Tanigawa
2015	R.J. Wood	Troon Country Club	Scottsdale, Arizona	206 (−4)^{PO}	Playoff	Matt Bryant; Chris Satterlee	Sam Triplett
2014	Chris Satterlee	Troon Country Club	Scottsdale, Arizona	203 (−7)	2 strokes	Andrew Yun	Ken Tanigawa
2013	Craig Hocknull	Superstition Mountain Golf & C.C. (Prospector)	Gold Canyon, Arizona	200 (−16)	3 strokes	Austyn Karle	Matt Record
2012	Max Scodro	Superstition Mountain Golf & C.C. (Prospector)	Gold Canyon, Arizona	201 (−15)	3 strokes	Brandon Smith	Michael Wog II
2011	Braxton Marquez	Superstition Mountain Golf & C.C. (Prospector)	Gold Canyon, Arizona	203 (−13)	3 strokes	Todd Demsey	Jeremy DeFalco
2010	Kendall Critchfield	Desert Mountain (Apache)	Scottsdale, Arizona	197 (−19)	3 strokes	Curt Byrum	David McDaniel
2009	Curt Byrum	Desert Mountain (Apache)	Scottsdale, Arizona	203 (−13)	2 strokes	Greg Avant	Michael Wog II
2008	Mike Ferris	Desert Mountain (Apache)	Scottsdale, Arizona	198 (−18)^{PO}	Playoff	Greg Bruckner	Chris Kessler
2007	Julien Trudeau	The Golf Club Scottsdale	Scottsdale, Arizona	204 (−12)	2 strokes	Steve Schneiter	Chan Kim
2006	Bret Guetz	Desert Mountain (Outlaw)	Scottsdale, Arizona	202 (−14)	1 stroke	Scott Frisch	Philip Francis
2005	Tom Stankowski	Troon Country Club	Scottsdale, Arizona	200 (−16)	5 strokes	Todd Rakotz	Philip Francis
2004	Steve Schneiter	Troon Country Club	Scottsdale, Arizona	205 (−11)	6 strokes	Todd Rakotz; Dean Vomacka	Ken Kellaney
2003	Greg Bruckner	Troon Country Club	Scottsdale, Arizona	197 (−19)	1 stroke	John Bizik	Philip Francis^{PO} beat David Brown
2002	Greg Casagranda	Troon Country Club	Scottsdale, Arizona	205 (−11)	1 stroke	Jin Park	Aaron Watkins
2001	Rob Rashell	Troon Country Club	Scottsdale, Arizona	210 (−6)	3 strokes	Jeremy Champoux; Mike Cunning; Brian Kontak	Rob Mangini; John Davis
2000	Jay Synkelma	Troon Country Club	Scottsdale, Arizona	209 (−7)	3 strokes	Tim Parun	Jin Park
1999	Mike Nicolette	Legend Trail Golf Club (R1); Troon North Golf Club (R2, R3)	Scottsdale, Arizona	207 (−9)^{PO}	Playoff	Gerry Norquist; Scott Watkins	unknown
1998	Todd Demsey	Legend Trail Golf Club (R1); Troon North Golf Club (R2, R3)	Scottsdale, Arizona	213 (−3)	1 stroke	Wade Dunegan; Gerry Norquist	Allen French
1997	Danny Briggs	Legend Trail Golf Club (R1, R2); Troon North Golf Club (R3)	Scottsdale, Arizona	212 (−1)	1 stroke	Jay Overton	Allen French
1996	Jim Carter	Desert Mountain (Renegade)	Scottsdale, Arizona	207 (−9)^{PO}	Playoff	Larry Mackin	Jeff Kern
1995	Danny Briggs	Desert Mountain (Renegade)	Scottsdale, Arizona	203 (−13)	3 strokes	R.W. Eaks	Ken Kellaney
1994	Van Batchelder	Desert Mountain (Renegade)	Scottsdale, Arizona	208 (−8)^{PO}	Playoff	Jim Carter	Richie Andrews
1993	Danny Briggs	Desert Mountain (Renegade)	Scottsdale, Arizona	204 (−12)	4 strokes	Jim Carter	Ed Smith
1992	Scott Watkins	Desert Mountain (Renegade)	Scottsdale, Arizona	207 (−9)^{PO}	Playoff	Trev Anderson	Mike Tompkins; Dave Russell
1991	Rick Cramer	McCormick Ranch Golf Club (Pine)	Scottsdale, Arizona	202 (−14)	7 strokes	Jim Ahern	Dan Meyers; Mike Tompkins
1990	R.W. Eaks	McCormick Ranch Golf Club (Pine Front, Palm Back)	Scottsdale, Arizona	210 (−6)^{PO}	Playoff	Danny Briggs; Larry Mackin	Scott Frisch
1989	Jim Carter	McCormick Ranch Golf Club (Pine R1, R2, Palm R3)	Scottsdale, Arizona	202 (−14)	8 strokes	John Adams; Ronnie Black	Mark Sollenberger
1988	Larry Silveira	McCormick Ranch Golf Club (Palm)	Scottsdale, Arizona	206 (-10)	2 strokes	Andrew Magee	Terry Beels
1987	Ronnie Black	Alta Mesa Country Club	Mesa, Arizona	200 (−16)	4 strokes	Jim Blair	Hub Goyen III
1986	Mike Morley	Alta Mesa Country Club	Mesa, Arizona	208 (−8)	3 strokes	Jim Carter	Dennis Saunders
1985	Bill Garrett	Dobson Ranch Golf Course	Mesa, Arizona	204 (−12) ^{PO}	Playoff	John Jackson; Mike Wright	Joe Bendetti
1984	Paul Nolen (a)	Dobson Ranch Golf Course	Mesa, Arizona	198 (−18)	4 strokes	Don DuBois; Craig McClellan; Paul Purtzer	Paul Nolen
1983	Mike Morley	Dobson Ranch Golf Course	Mesa, Arizona	197 (−16)	3 strokes	Mike Franko; Bobby Phillips; Jeff Thomsen; Larry Webb	Paul Nolen^{PO} beat Jim Carter
1982	Paul Purtzer	Dobson Ranch Golf Course	Mesa, Arizona	205 (−8) ^{PO}	Playoff	John Jackson	Mark Sollenberger
1981	Fred Marti	Tucson Country Club	Tucson, Arizona	209 (−7)	3 strokes	Ray Arinno	Mark Sollenberger
1980	Larry Webb	Desert Hills Desert Hills Golf Course (R1, R2); Yuma Golf and Country Club (R3)	Yuma, Arizona	203 (−13)	4 strokes	Steve Willis	Tony Grimes
1979	Roy McMillan (a)	Oro Valley Country Club	Oro Valley, Arizona	211 (−5)	3 strokes	Don Pooley; Art Wall	Roy McMillan
1978	Bob Betley	Pinnacle Peak Country Club	Scottsdale, Arizona	215 (−1) ^{PO}	Playoff	Phil Ferranti	Don DuBois
1977	Jeff Thomsen	Antelope Hills Golf Course	Prescott, Arizona	207 (−6)	2 strokes	Bob Gaona; Bill Garrett	Tom Gray
1976	Bob Betley	McCormick Ranch Golf Club (Pine R1, R2, Palm R3)	Scottsdale, Arizona	208 (-8)	5 strokes	Terry Dear; Bill Garrett	Kirk Padgett
1975	Bill Garrett	Desert Forest Golf Club	Carefree, Arizona	216 (E)	5 strokes	Ron Ault; Mark Sollenberger (a)	Mark Sollenberger
1974	Jim Marshall	Rio Verde Country Club	Rio Verde, Arizona	206 (−7)	1 stroke	Joe Porter III	Charles Gibson
1973	Steve Spray	Lake Montezuma Golf Course (R1, R2); Oakcreek Country Club (R3)	Sedona, Arizona	209 (−6)	3 strokes	Bill Johnston	Charles Gibson
1972	Bill Johnston	Oakcreek Country Club (R1, R2); Lake Montezuma Golf Course (R3)	Sedona, Arizona	203 (−11)	5 strokes	Rich Bland; Glenn McMinn	Steve Stull^{PO} beat Dick Hopwood
1971	Paul Purtzer (a)	Lake Montezuma Golf Course	Sedona, Arizona	202 (-11)	1 stroke	Phil Gibbs; Ron Reif	Paul Purtzer
1970	Jim Marshall	Lake Havasu Golf Club	Lake Havasu City, Arizona	215 (−1) ^{PO}	Playoff	Dick Turner	Bill Viele
1969	Bob Augustine (a)	Sierra Estrella Golf Course	Goodyear, Arizona	207 (-6) ^{PO}	Playoff	Dick Turner	Bob Augustine
1968	Dick Turner	Scottsdale Country Club	Scottsdale, Arizona	137 (-3)^{***}	1 stroke	Bill Johnston; Ed Moehling	Paul Purtzer
1967	Bill Johnston	Coconino Country Club	Flagstaff, Arizona	215 (-1)	2 strokes	Johnny Bulla; Darrell Hickok	Joe Riordan
1966	Gar Garland	Arizona Country Club; Papago Golf Club; Century Country Club (R4)	Phoenix, Arizona	275 (-13)^{**}	4 strokes	Joe Porter III (a)	Joe Porter III
1965	Dale Douglass	Mesa Country Club; Century Country Club; San Marcos Country Club (R4)	Mesa, Arizona; Phoenix, Arizona; Chandler, Arizona	268 (−20)^{**}	7 strokes	Johnny Bulla; Al Chandler; Bill Garrett	Dick Hopwood
1964	Kermit Zarley	Century Country Club; San Marcos Country Club; Mesa Country Club (R4)	Phoenix, Arizona; Chandler, Arizona; Mesa, Arizona	275 (-11)^{**}	3 strokes	Bill Johnston	Dick Hopwood
1963	Larry Mancour	Mesa Country Club; Moon Valley Country Club; Century Country Club (R4)	Mesa, Arizona; Phoenix, Arizona; Phoenix, Arizona	273 (−15)	5 strokes	Bob Harris	George Boutell
1962	R. H. Sikes (a)	Arizona Country Club	Phoenix, Arizona	282 (−2)^{**} ^{PO}	Playoff	Wayne Breck (a); Bob Harris	R. H. Sikes
1961	Bill Johnston	Arizona Country Club	Phoenix, Arizona	281 (-7)^{**}	5 strokes	Al Chandler; Bob Harris; Sonny Methvin (a)	Sonny Methvin
1960	Al Mengert	Moon Valley Country Club	Phoenix, Arizona	201 (-15)	15 strokes	Dick Metz	Wayne Breck
1959	Johnny Bulla	Scottsdale Country Club	Scottsdale, Arizona	209 (-4)	3 strokes	George Keyes	Dick Hopwood
1958	Johnny Bulla	Antelope Hills Golf Course	Prescott, Arizona	204 (-12)	5 strokes	Jim Hiskey	Duff Lawrence
1957	Tom Lambie	Yuma Golf & Country Club	Yuma, Arizona	209 (-7)	1 stroke	Johnny Bulla	Ralph Quiroz
1956	Dick Knight	Yuma Golf & Country Club	Yuma, Arizona	278 (−10)^{**}	2 strokes	Billy Casper	Duff Lawrence; Ralph Quiroz; Marvin Walker
1955	George Keyes	Phoenix Country Club	Phoenix, Arizona	143 (+1)^{*}	1 stroke	Errie Ball; Willie Wansa	Gray Madison
1954	Errie Ball	El Rio Golf Club	Mohave Valley, Arizona	137 (-3)^{*}	5 strokes	George Keyes	Ray Cznowski
1953	Don Byrd	Wigwam Country Club	Litchfield Park, Arizona	221 (+8)	2 strokes	Lee Griffith (a)	Lee Griffith
1952	The Championship was not held						
1951	Johnny Bulla	Wigwam Country Club	Litchfield Park, Arizona	212 (−1) ^{PO}	Playoff	Joe Monez	Dick Hopwood
1950	Johnny Bulla	Tucson Country Club	Tucson, Arizona	210 (−6)	5 strokes	Bob Goldwater (a)	Bob Goldwater
1949	Jimmy Hines	El Rio Golf Club	Mohave Valley, Arizona	199 (-11)	4 strokes	Johnny Revolta	Johnny Rudolph
1948	The Championship was not held						
1947	Johnny Bulla	Phoenix Country Club	Phoenix, Arizona	140 (-2)^{*}	3 strokes	Vernon Allen	Bob Goldwater
1946	The Championship was not held due to World War II						
1945	The Championship was not held due to World War II						
1944	The Championship was not held due to World War II						
1943	The Championship was not held due to World War II						
1942	The Championship was not held due to World War II						
1941	Bob Hunsick	Naco Country Club	Naco, Arizona	211 (-5)	6 strokes	Herb Bowers; Jack Harden	Kim Bannister, Jr.
1940	Dell Urich	Bisbee Country Club	Bisbee, Arizona	224 (+8)	2 strokes	Herb Bowers	Barge Pease
1939	Dell Urich	El Rio Golf Club	Mohave Valley, Arizona	143 (+3)^{*}	2 strokes	Charlie Brown (a)	Charlie Brown
1938	Dell Urich	Phoenix Country Club	Phoenix, Arizona	290 (+6)^{**}	1 stroke	Fred Dold (a); Bob Hunsick	Fred Dold
1937	Dell Urich	Phoenix Country Club	Phoenix, Arizona	143 (+1)^{*}	2 strokes	Vernon Allen	Dave Peter

- a = Amateur
- ^{PO} = Won in playoff
- ^{*} = Championship was 36-holes
- ^{**} = Championship was 72-holes
- ^{***} = Championship was shortened to 36-holes after two-day rain delay

== Records ==
- Most titles: 5 by Johnny Bulla (1947, 1950, 1951, 1958, 1959)
- Most consecutive titles: 4 by Dell Urich (1937, 1938, 1939, 1940)
- Most times runner-up (including ties): 3 by Mark Baldwin (2024, 2025, 2026), Johnny Bulla (1957, 1965, 1967), Bill Johnston (1964, 1968, 1973), Bill Garrett (1965, 1976, 1977)
- Most often first or second (including ties): 8 by Johnny Bulla (1st 1947, 1950, 1951, 1958, 1959; 2nd 1957, 1965, 1967)
- Most top 5 finishes (including ties): 12 by Johnny Bulla (1947-1973)
- Most top 10 finishes (including ties): 17 by Johnny Bulla (1947-1975)
- Low 54-hole score: 197 (−19) by 3 players
- Low 36-hole score: 127 (−13) by Jake Younan (R1-2, 61-66), Troon Country Club, 2018
- Low 18-hole score: 61 (−9) by Jake Younan (R1), Troon Country Club, 2018
- Low first round score: 61 (−9) by Jake Younan (R1), Troon Country Club, 2018
- Low second round score: 63 (−9) by Ronnie Black, Alta Mesa Country Club, 1987
- Low third round score: 63 (−9) by amateur Michael Feagles, Superstition Mountain Golf & Country Club, 2019
- Largest victory margin: 15 by Al Mengert (over Dick Metz), Moon Valley Country Club, 1960
