= Colorado Open =

Colorado state open golf tournament

The Colorado Open is the Colorado state open golf tournament, open to both amateur and professional golfers. It is organized by the Colorado Open Golf Foundation. It has been played annually since 1964 at a variety of courses around the state.

== Winners ==
- 2026 Carson Lundell
- 2025 Jim Knous
- 2024 Davis Bryant
- 2023 Turk Pettit
- 2022 Wil Collins
- 2021 Alex Weiss
- 2020 Mark Anguiano
- 2019 Sam Saunders
- 2018 Dru Love
- 2017 Jonathan Kaye
- 2016 Neil Johnson
- 2015 Jimmy Gunn
- 2014 Ian Davis
- 2013 Zahkai Brown
- 2012 Derek Tolan
- 2011 Ben Portie
- 2010 Nate Lashley
- 2009 Derek Tolan
- 2008 Brian Guetz
- 2007 John Douma
- 2006 Dustin White
- 2005 Wil Collins
- 2004 Bill Loeffler
- 2003 No tournament
- 2002 Kevin Stadler
- 2001 Brett Wayment
- 2000 Scott Petersen
- 1999 Bill Riddle
- 1998 Shane Bertsch
- 1997 Doug Dunakey
- 1996 Jonathan Kaye
- 1995 Mike Zaremba
- 1994 Brian Guetz (a)
- 1993 Bill Loeffler
- 1992 Brandt Jobe
- 1991 Bill Loeffler
- 1990 Bob Betley
- 1989 Chris Endres
- 1988 Steve Jones
- 1987 James Blair
- 1986 Mark Wiebe
- 1985 Al Geiberger
- 1984 Willie Wood
- 1983 James Blair
- 1982 Dan Halldorson
- 1981 Dave Hill
- 1980 Larry Webb
- 1979 Larry Mowry
- 1978 Paul Purtzer
- 1977 Dave Hill
- 1976 Dave Hill
- 1975 Pat Rea
- 1974 Gary Longfellow (a)
- 1973 Bill Johnston
- 1972 Gene Torres
- 1971 Dave Hill
- 1970 Wright Garrett
- 1969 Ted Hart
- 1968 Vic Kline
- 1967 Bill Bisdorf
- 1966 Bob Pratt
- 1965 Bill Bisdorf
- 1964 Bill Bisdorf

a = amateur
