= Utah Open =

Golf tournament

The Utah Open is the Utah state open golf tournament, open to both amateur and professional golfers. It is organized by the Utah section of the PGA of America. It was first played in 1926 and has been played at a variety of courses around the state. It was occasionally a PGA Tour event: in the 1940s, 1960, and 1963. Since 2003, the title sponsor has been Siegfried & Jensen.

== Winners ==
- 2026 Blake Tomlinson
- 2025 Kihei Akina (a)
- 2024 Derek Fribbs
- 2023 Zac Blair
- 2022 Blake Tomlinson
- 2021 Derek Fribbs
- 2020 Peter Kuest
- 2019 Sam Saunders
- 2018 Dusty Fielding
- 2017 Patrick Fishburn (amateur)
- 2016 Zahkai Brown
- 2015 Nate Lashley
- 2014 B. J. Staten
- 2013 Zach Johnson
- 2012 James Drew
- 2011 Clay Ogden
- 2010 Nicholas Mason
- 2009 Nate Lashley
- 2008 Bruce Summerhays
- 2007 Clay Ogden
- 2006 Pete Stone
- 2005 Nick McKinlay
- 2004 Greg Buckway (amateur)
- 2003 Steve Friesen
- 2002 Boyd Summerhays
- 2001 Kim Thompson
- 2000 Todd Fischer
- 1999 Dean Wilson
- 1998 Todd Demsey
- 1997 Steve Runge
- 1996 Patrick Boyd
- 1995 J. B. Sneve
- 1994 Warren Schutte
- 1993 Dennis Paulson
- 1992 Grant Waite
- 1991 Eric Hogg
- 1990 Mark Carnevale
- 1989 Neal Lancaster
- 1988 Jay Don Blake
- 1987 Perry Arthur
- 1986 Clark Burroughs
- 1985 Mike Reid
- 1984 Richard Zokol
- 1983 Mike Reid
- 1982 Larry Webb
- 1981 Jimmy Blair
- 1980 Ray Arinno
- 1979 Bob Betley
- 1978 Terry Mauney
- 1977 Larry Webb
- 1976 Gary Vanier
- 1975 Mike Brannan
- 1974 Mike Malaska
- 1973 Paul Allen
- 1972 Victor Regalado
- 1971 Ernesto Perez Acosta
- 1970 Buddy Allin
- 1969 Tommy Williams
- 1968 Dick Payne
- 1967 Richard Potzner
- 1966 Ernie Schneiter, Jr.
- 1965 Randy Glover ($2,000)
- 1964 No tournament
- 1963 Tommy Jacobs ($6,400)
- 1962 Zell Eaton ($500)
- 1961 Al Geiberger ($1,600)
- 1960 Bill Johnston ($2,800)
- 1959 Bob Rosburg ($1,500)
- 1958 Dow Finsterwald ($2,000)
- 1957 Zell Eaton ($1,500)
- 1956 Dick Lundahl
- 1955 Ellsworth Vines ($800)
- 1954 Bill Johnston ($800)
- 1953 Zell Eaton ($750)
- 1952 Bud Ward ($750)
- 1951 Smiley Quick ($750)
- 1950 Harold West ($1,000)
- 1949 Joe Bernolfo (amateur)
- 1948 Lloyd Mangrum ($2,150)
- 1947 Johnny Palmer ($2,200)
- 1946 Emery Zimmerman
- 1945 Emery Zimmerman
- 1944 Jug McSpaden ($700)
- 1943 George Schneiter
- 1942 Ed Dudley
- 1941 George Schneiter
- 1940 Emery Zimmerman
- 1939 Emery Zimmerman ($350)
- 1938 Al Zimmerman
- 1937 Al Zimmerman
- 1936 George Schneiter
- 1935 Fred Morrison
- 1934 Ed Kingsley
- 1933 Ky Laffoon ($201)
- 1932 C. E. Foley
- 1931 Owen Covey
- 1930 Babe McHugh
- 1929 Babe McHugh
- 1928 Tom McHugh
- 1927 C. E. Foley
- 1926 Eddie Morrison
