= 1970 PGA Tour =

Golf tour season

1970 PGA Tour season
- Duration: January 8, 1970 – December 13, 1970
- Number of official events: 45
- Most wins: (United States) Billy Casper (4)
- Money list: (United States) Lee Trevino
- PGA Player of the Year: (United States) Billy Casper

The 1970 PGA Tour was the 55th season of the PGA Tour, the main professional golf tour in the United States. It was also the second season since separating from the PGA of America.

== Schedule ==
The following table lists official events during the 1970 season.

Date	Tournament	Location	Purse (US$)	Winner(s) (Note: The number in parentheses after each winner's name is the number of PGA Tour events they had won up to and including that tournament. This information is only shown for PGA Tour members.)	Notes
Jan 11	Los Angeles Open	California	100,000	(United States) Billy Casper (44)	
Jan 18	Phoenix Open Invitational	Arizona	100,000	(United States) Dale Douglass (3)	
Jan 25	Bing Crosby National Pro-Am	California	125,000	(United States) Bert Yancey (6)	Pro-Am
Feb 1	Andy Williams-San Diego Open Invitational	California	150,000	(United States) Pete Brown (2)	
Feb 8	Bob Hope Desert Classic	California	125,000	(Australia) Bruce Devlin (5)	Pro-Am
Feb 15	Tucson Open Invitational	Arizona	100,000	(United States) Lee Trevino (4)	
Feb 22	San Antonio Open Invitational	Texas	100,000	(United States) Ron Cerrudo (2)	
Mar 1	Doral-Eastern Open Invitational	Florida	150,000	(United States) Mike Hill (1)	
Mar 6	Florida Citrus Open Invitational	Florida	25,000	(United States) Bob Stone (n/a)	Second Tour (Note: Official money; unofficial win.)
Mar 8	Florida Citrus Invitational	Florida	150,000	(United States) Bob Lunn (4)	
Mar 15	Monsanto Open	Florida	150,000	(United States) Dick Lotz (2)	
Mar 23	Greater Jacksonville Open	Florida	100,000	(United States) Don January (8)	
Mar 29	National Airlines Open Invitational	Florida	200,000	(United States) Lee Trevino (5)	
Apr 5	Greater Greensboro Open	North Carolina	180,000	(South Africa) Gary Player (13)	
Apr 12	Magnolia Classic	Mississippi	20,000	(United States) Chris Blocker (n/a)	Second Tour
Apr 13	Masters Tournament	Georgia	125,000	(United States) Billy Casper (45)	Major championship
Apr 20	Greater New Orleans Open Invitational	Louisiana	125,000	(United States) Miller Barber (5)	
Apr 26	Tournament of Champions	California	150,000	(United States) Frank Beard (9)	Winners-only event
Apr 26	Tallahassee Open Invitational	Florida	50,000	(South Africa) Harold Henning (2)	Alternate event
May 3	Byron Nelson Golf Classic	Texas	100,000	(United States) Jack Nicklaus (31)	
May 10	Houston Champions International	Texas	115,000	(United States) Gibby Gilbert (1)	
May 17	Colonial National Invitation	Texas	125,000	(United States) Homero Blancas (2)	Invitational
May 24	Atlanta Classic	Georgia	125,000	(United States) Tommy Aaron (2)	
May 31	Danny Thomas Memphis Classic	Tennessee	150,000	(United States) Dave Hill (8)	
Jun 7	Kemper Open	North Carolina	150,000	(United States) Dick Lotz (3)	
Jun 7	Kiwanis Peninsula Open Invitational	Virginia	25,000	(United States) Jerry Barrier (n/a)	Second Tour
Jun 14	Western Open	Illinois	130,000	(United States) Hugh Royer Jr. (1)	
Jun 21	U.S. Open	Minnesota	195,000	(England) Tony Jacklin (3)	Major championship
Jun 28	Cleveland Open	Ohio	150,000	(Australia) Bruce Devlin (6)	
Jul 5	Canadian Open	Canada	125,000	(United States) Kermit Zarley (2)	
Jul 12	Greater Milwaukee Open	Wisconsin	110,000	(United States) Deane Beman (2)	
Jul 12	The Open Championship	Scotland	£40,000	(United States) Jack Nicklaus (32)	Major championship (Note: Unofficial money event at the time, but retrospectively counted as an official win.)
Jul 19	IVB-Philadelphia Golf Classic	Pennsylvania	150,000	(United States) Billy Casper (46)	
Jul 26	National Four-Ball Championship	Pennsylvania	200,000	(United States) Jack Nicklaus (33) and (United States) Arnold Palmer (57)	Team event
Aug 2	Westchester Classic	New York	250,000	(Australia) Bruce Crampton (8)	
Aug 9	American Golf Classic	Ohio	150,000	(United States) Frank Beard (10)	
Aug 16	PGA Championship	Oklahoma	200,000	(United States) Dave Stockton (4)	Major championship
Aug 24	AVCO Golf Classic	Massachusetts	160,000	(United States) Billy Casper (47)	
Aug 30	Dow Jones Open Invitational	New Jersey	300,000	(United States) Bobby Nichols (9)	New tournament
Sep 7	Greater Hartford Open Invitational	Connecticut	100,000	(United States) Bob Murphy (3)	
Sep 20	Robinson Open Golf Classic	Illinois	100,000	(Canada) George Knudson (7)	
Sep 27	Green Island Open Invitational	Georgia	60,000	(United States) Mason Rudolph (5)	New tournament
Oct 4	Azalea Open Invitational	North Carolina	60,000	(Mexico) Cesar Sanudo (1)	
Oct 25	Kaiser International Open Invitational	California	150,000	(United States) Ken Still (3)	
Nov 1	Sahara Invitational	Nevada	100,000	(United States) Babe Hiskey (1)	
Nov 28	Sea Pines Open Invitational	South Carolina	30,000	(United States) Larry Wood (n/a)	Second Tour
Nov 29	Heritage Golf Classic	South Carolina	100,000	(United States) Bob Goalby (10)	Invitational
Dec 6	Coral Springs Open Invitational	Florida	125,000	(United States) Bill Garrett (1)	New tournament
Dec 13	Bahama Islands Open	Bahamas	130,000	(United States) Doug Sanders (19)	New tournament

=== Unofficial events ===
The following events were sanctioned by the PGA Tour, but did not carry official money, nor were wins official.

Date	Tournament	Location	Purse ($)	Winner(s)	Notes
Nov 15	World Cup	Argentina	6,300	(Australia) Bruce Devlin and (Australia) David Graham	Team event
Nov 15	World Cup Individual Trophy	Argentina	6,300	(Argentina) Roberto De Vicenzo	

== Money list ==
The money list was based on prize money won during the season, calculated in U.S. dollars.

Position	Player	Prize money ($)
1	(United States) Lee Trevino	157,037
2	(United States) Billy Casper	147,372
3	(Australia) Bruce Crampton	142,609
4	(United States) Jack Nicklaus	142,149
5	(United States) Arnold Palmer	128,853
6	(United States) Dick Lotz	125,023
7	(United States) Frank Beard	124,689
8	(United States) Larry Hinson	120,897
9	(United States) Bob Murphy	120,638
10	(United States) Dave Hill	118,415

== Awards ==
Award	Winner	Ref.
PGA Player of the Year	(United States) Billy Casper	
Scoring leader (Vardon Trophy)	(United States) Lee Trevino	
