= Northern California Open =

Golf tournament

The Northern California Open is a golf tournament played in the Northern California, open to both amateur and professional golfers. It is run by the Northern California section of the PGA of America. It has been played annually since 1920 at a variety of courses around the state. It was considered a PGA Tour event in the 1920s.

== Winners ==
- 2022 Derek Ackerman
- 2021 David Laskin
- 2020 Jonathan De Los Reyes
- 2019 Don Leafstrand
- 2018 Cody Blick
- 2017 Adam Stone
- 2016 Gregor Main
- 2015 Xander Schauffele
- 2014 Kyle Souza
- 2013 John Jackson
- 2012 Anthony Verna
- 2011 Jeff Rangel
- 2010 Ryan Thornberry
- 2009 Todd Fischer
- 2008 Boyd Summerhays
- 2007 Matt Bettencourt
- 2006 Gundy Jones
- 2005 Robert Hamilton
- 2004 John Ellis
- 2003 Matt Bettencourt
- 2002 Matt Bettencourt
- 2001 Brad Martin
- 2000 Shawn Kelly
- 1999 Casey Boyns
- 1998 Jon Chaffee
- 1997 Jon Chaffee
- 1996 Patrick Boyd
- 1995 Shawn Kelly
- 1994 Eric Buckelew
- 1993 Todd Spain
- 1992 Ron Parsons
- 1991 Chris Holzgang
- 1990 David Sutherland
- 1989 Jeff Wilson
- 1988 Dale Riley
- 1987 Joey Rassett
- 1986 Mark Blakely
- 1985 Joey Rassett
- 1984 Bill Glasson
- 1983 Jim Kane
- 1982 Bob Boldt
- 1981 Mike Brannan
- 1980 Pat McGowan
- 1979 Brent Bonino
- 1978 Ray Arinno
- 1977 Rick Rhoads
- 1976 Peter Jacobsen
- 1975 Ray Arinno
- 1974 Bruce Summerhays
- 1973 Roger Maltbie
- 1972 Ken Towns
- 1971 Vic Loustalot
- 1970 Sandy Galbraith
- 1969 David Barber
- 1968 Jerry Heard
- 1967 George Archer
- 1966 Dick Lotz
- 1965 John McMullin
- 1964 George Archer
- 1963 George Archer
- 1962 Tony Lema
- 1961 Alex Sutton
- 1960 Tal Smith
- 1959 No tournament
- 1958 Dick Knight
- 1957 Joe Greer
- 1956 Bud Ward
- 1955 Smiley Quick
- 1954 George Schneiter
- 1953 Eric Monti
- 1952 Dutch Harrison
- 1951 Bud Ward
- 1950 Charles Seaver
- 1949 Art Bell
- 1948 Bill Nary
- 1947 Tal Smith
- 1946 Charles R. Sheppard
- 1945 Jim Ferrier
- 1944 Jim Ferrier
- 1943 Art Bell
- 1942 Harry Bassler
- 1941 Mark Fry
- 1940 Mark Fry
- 1939 Charles R. Sheppard
- 1938 No tournament
- 1937 Harry Bassler
- 1936 Willie Goggin
- 1935 Willie Goggin
- 1934 Lawson Little
- 1933 Ben F. Coltrin
- 1932 Charles R. Sheppard
- 1931 Charles R. Sheppard
- 1927–30 No tournament
- 1926 Frank Minch
- 1925 No tournament
- 1924 Macdonald Smith
- 1923 Harold Sampson
- 1922 Jock Hutchison
- 1921 Eddie Loos
- 1920 John Black
