= Fred Wampler (golfer) =

American professional golfer (1923–1985)

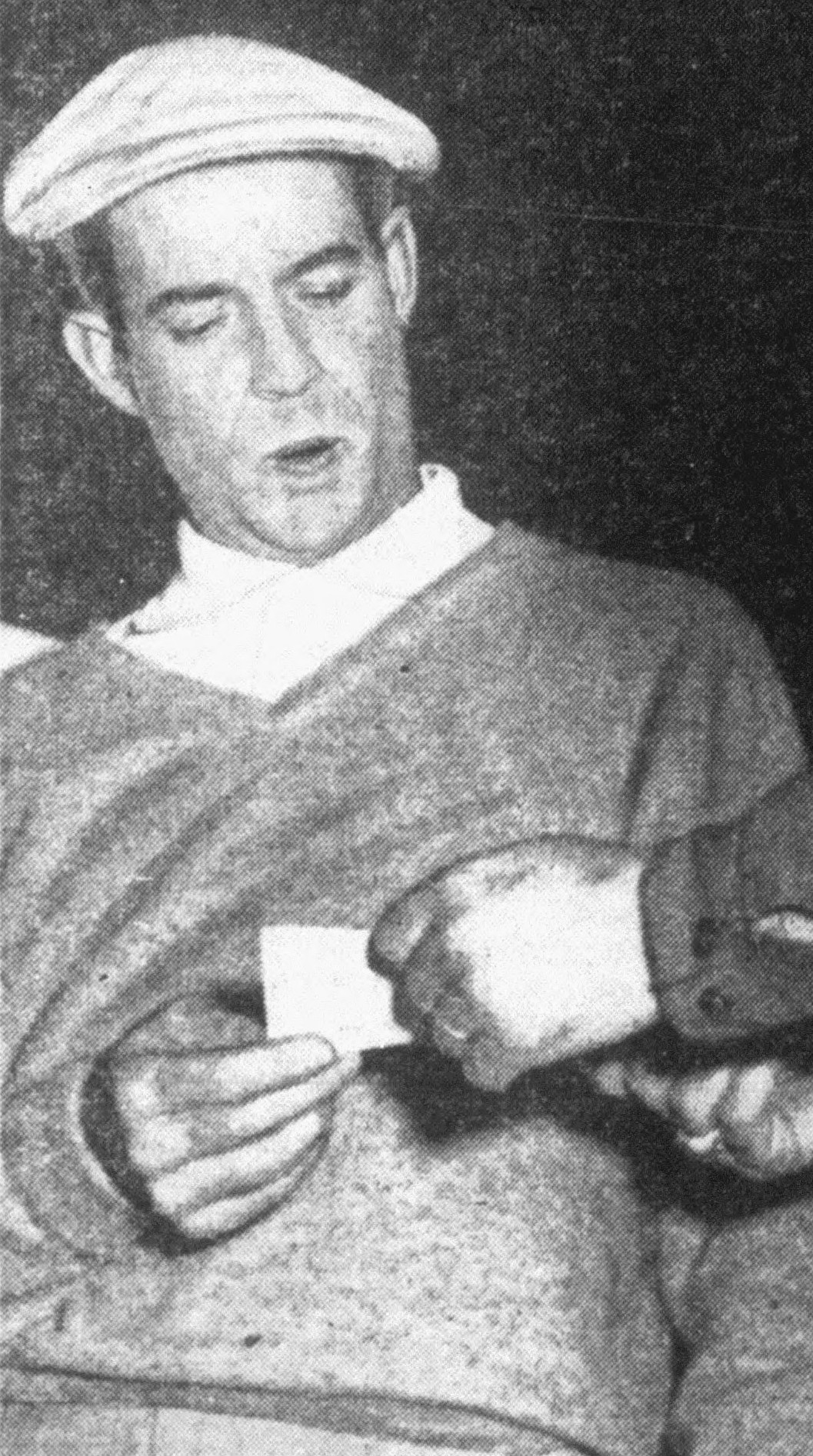
- Wampler is presented with a check for winning the 1954 Los Angeles Open.

Personal information
- Full name: Frederick L. Wampler
- Nationality: United States
- Born: October 17, 1923 Bedford, Indiana, U.S.
- Died: April 27, 1985 (aged 61)

Career
- Sport: Golf
- College: Purdue University
- Turned professional: 1950
- Former tours: PGA Tour; Champions Tour
- Professional wins: 10

Number of wins by tour
- PGA Tour: 1

Best results in major championships
- Masters Tournament: DNP
- PGA Championship: T38: 1967
- U.S. Open: T28: 1959
- The Open Championship: DNP

Frederick L. Wampler (October 17, 1923 – April 27, 1985) was an American professional golfer who played on the PGA Tour and the Senior PGA Tour.

== Early life and amateur career ==
Wampler was born in Bedford, Indiana. He played on the Purdue University golf team from 1948 to 1950. In 1950, he won the NCAA individual championship, was selected as Purdue's first All-American and won the Big Ten individual title for the third consecutive year. Wampler still shares the Big Ten tournament record for lowest individual round with a 64 in the fourth round of the 1950 Big Ten Championships.

A veteran of World War II, Wampler served in the United States Navy in the Pacific prior to enrolling at Purdue University.

== Professional career ==
Wampler's only PGA Tour win came at the 1954 Los Angeles Open. He finished runner-up to Sam Snead in the 1956 Greater Greensboro Open on the second hole of a sudden death playoff. Like most golfers of his generation, he earned his living primarily as a club professional. Starting in 1965, he served 17 years as the head pro at Denver Country Club.

On the Senior PGA Tour, Wampler finished runner-up twice in the Senior PGA Championship. In 1975, he lost on the first playoff hole to Charlie Sifford and in 1976, he finished five strokes behind Pete Cooper.

== Death ==
Wampler died at the age of 61 after an 18-year battle with chronic leukemia.

== Awards and honors ==
- In 1972, Wampler was inducted into the Indiana Golf Hall of Fame
- In 1997, Wampler was inducted into the Purdue University Sports Hall of Fame
- In 1997, Wampler was inducted into the Colorado Golf Hall of Fame

== Amateur wins ==
- 1947 Indiana Amateur
- 1948 Big 10 Championship
- 1949 Indiana Amateur, Big 10 Championship
- 1950 Big 10 Championship, NCAA Championship

== Professional wins (10) ==
=== PGA Tour wins (1) ===
No.	Date	Tournament	Winning score	Margin of victory	Runners-up
1	Jan 11, 1954	Los Angeles Open	−3 (70-70-66-75=281)	1 stroke	(United States) Jerry Barber, (United States) Chick Harbert

PGA Tour playoff record (0–1)

No.	Year	Tournament	Opponent	Result
1	1956	Greater Greensboro Open	(United States) Sam Snead	Lost to birdie on second extra hole

=== Other wins (9) ===
This list may be incomplete

- 1950 Indiana Open (as an amateur)
- 1952 Long Island Open
- 1953 Manchester Open
- 1962 St. Clair Open
- 1966 Colorado PGA Championship
- 1968 Colorado PGA Championship
- 1973 Colorado PGA Championship
- 1974 Colorado PGA Championship
- 1983 Indiana Senior Open
