= Bill Loeffler =

American golfer (born 1956)

Personal information
- Full name: William R. Loeffler
- Nationality: United States
- Born: August 9, 1956 (age 70) Denver, Colorado, U.S.
- Height: 5 ft 11 in (1.80 m)
- Weight: 185 lb (84 kg; 13.2 st)

Career
- Sport: Golf
- College: Arizona State University
- Turned professional: c.1979 reinstated amateur c.1985 1989
- Former tour: PGA Tour
- Professional wins: 9

Best results in major championships
- Masters Tournament: CUT: 1988
- PGA Championship: CUT: 2001
- U.S. Open: CUT: 1979
- The Open Championship: DNP

William R. Loeffler (born August 9, 1956) is an American professional golfer.

== Early life and amateur career ==
In 1956, Loeffler was born in Denver, Colorado. He played college golf at Arizona State University where he won twice. Loeffler was an All-American in 1977.

== Career ==
In 1980 and 1981, Loeffler played on the PGA Tour. His best finish was T-32 at the 1981 Quad Cities Open. He quit professional golf and was reinstated as an amateur by the USGA. He subsequently won the 1986 U.S. Mid-Amateur title and was a member of the winning 1987 Walker Cup team. He turned professional a second time in 1989.

Loeffler was disqualified in his first appearance at a U.S. Senior Open in 2013. He has played in four Senior PGA Championship tournaments, including the 2010 event at Colorado Golf Club in Parker, Colorado where he tied for 56th after going into the final round tied for 30th.

In 1995, Loeffler was inducted into the Colorado Golf Hall of Fame.

Loeffler is the former owner and operator of the Links at Highlands Ranch, a par-62 executive golf course.

== Awards and honors ==
- In 1977, while at Arizona State University, Loeffler was an All-American.
- In 1995, Loeffler was inducted into the Colorado Golf Hall of Fame.

== Amateur wins ==
- 1986 U.S. Mid-Amateur

== Professional wins ==
- 1991 Colorado Open
- 1992 PGA Assistant Professional Championship
- 1993 Colorado Open
- 2000 Colorado PGA Championship
- 2002 Colorado PGA Championship
- 2004 Colorado PGA Championship, Colorado Open
- 2007 Senior PGA Professional National Championship
- 2009 Colorado Senior Open

== U.S. national team appearances ==
Amateur

- Walker Cup: 1987 (winners)

== See also ==
- Spring 1981 PGA Tour Qualifying School graduates
