= Bob Betley =

American professional golfer (1940–2020)

Personal information
- Full name: Robert Hansen Betley
- Nationality: United States
- Born: February 1, 1940 Butte, Montana, U.S.
- Died: April 28, 2020 (aged 80)
- Spouse: Jane Betley

Career
- Sport: Golf
- College: Weber State University
- Status: Professional
- Former tour: Senior PGA Tour
- Professional wins: 6

Number of wins by tour
- PGA Tour Champions: 1
- Other: 5

Best results in major championships
- Masters Tournament: DNP
- PGA Championship: T47: 1987
- U.S. Open: CUT: 1983, 1985
- The Open Championship: DNP

Robert Hansen Betley (February 1, 1940 – April 28, 2020) was an American professional golfer who is best known for having played on the Senior PGA Tour.

== Early life ==
Betley was born in Butte, Montana. He attended Weber State University, where he majored in police science and administration. He started playing golf at age 28.

== Professional career ==
Betley spent most of his regular career years as a club pro. He was known for driving the ball long distances. He was runner-up at the 1986 PGA Club Professional Championship. Through Monday qualifying and sponsor exemptions, he played in a few PGA Tour events during his regular career years. His best showing in a major was a T-47 at the 1987 PGA Championship.

Upon reaching the age of 50 in February 1990, Betley joined the Senior PGA Tour. He has more than a dozen top-10 finishes in this venue including a win at the 1993 Bank of Boston Senior Classic.

== Personal life ==
Betley died at the age of 80 on April 28, 2020.

== Professional wins (6) ==
=== Other wins (5) ===
- 1976 Arizona Open
- 1978 Arizona Open
- 1979 Utah Open
- 1986 Utah PGA Championship
- 1990 Colorado Open

=== Senior PGA Tour wins (1) ===
No.	Date	Tournament	Winning score	Margin of victory	Runner-up
1	Aug 8, 1993	Bank of Boston Senior Golf Classic	−12 (66-69-69=204)	1 stroke	(United States) Bob Murphy

Senior PGA Tour playoff record (0–1)

No.	Year	Tournament	Opponent	Result
1	1992	Franklin Showdown Classic	(United States) Orville Moody	Lost to birdie on eighth extra hole
