= Lloyd Gullickson =

American golfer (1899–1982)

Personal information
- Full name: Lloyd F. Gullickson
- Nickname: Gully
- Nationality: United States
- Born: March 23, 1899 Illinois, U.S.
- Died: May 7, 1982 (aged 83) Gulfport, Florida, U.S.
- Height: 6 ft 2.5 in (189 cm)

Career
- Sport: Golf
- Turned professional: 1919
- Former tour: PGA Tour
- Professional wins: 7

Best results in major championships
- Masters Tournament: DNP
- PGA Championship: T17: 1920
- U.S. Open: T28: 1922
- The Open Championship: DNP

Lloyd F. Gullickson (March 23, 1899 – May 7, 1982) was an American professional golfer who played in the early-to-mid 20th century. As an amateur he won the 1917 and 1918 Chicago Amateur Championships, on both occasions using borrowed clubs. He turned professional in 1919 and later posted good finishes in the U.S. Open and PGA Championship.

His best U.S. Open finish was T28 in 1922 and his best PGA Championship effort came in 1920 when he finished T17. Gullickson won the 1934 Ohio Open as well as six other professional tournaments.

== Early life ==
Gullickson, who was born in 1899 in Illinois, learned golf by first starting out as a caddie at the Jackson Park Golf Course in Chicago, Illinois. He grew up under difficult circumstances when he became orphaned at age 11 when his mother, a poor upholsterer, died. Among others, he carried the bag of Chick Evans at Jackson Park who would later help Gullickson obtain his first pro posting at Lake Shore Golf Club in Braeside, Illinois.

== Golf career ==
=== Amateur golf career ===
He won the 1917 Chicago Amateur Championship and while serving in the U.S. Navy at Naval Station Great Lakes during World War I, he took a leave of absence to play in and win the tournament again in 1918. He was unable to afford his own clubs at the time and won both tournaments using borrowed clubs. Known as a long hitter of the ball, he turned professional in 1919.

=== Pro golf career ===
Gullickson had a number of starts in the U.S. Open and PGA Championship. In the U.S. Open, his finest performance was T28 in 1922 and his best PGA Championship effort came in 1920 when he finished T17.

By 1926 he was serving as the head professional at The Elks Country Club in McDermott, Ohio. He later served at Westwood Country Club in Rocky River, Ohio, for the 1927 season. He won the Ohio Open in 1934 – as well as six other professional tournaments – and was hired as the head professional at the Inverness Club in 1945, succeeding Byron Nelson. He remained at Inverness as the summer professional until his retirement in 1965. During the winters, Gullickson served at the Pasadena Golf Club in St. Petersburg, Florida.

=== Memorable match ===
In 1934, Gullickson partnered with fellow pro Babe Didrikson in a match against amateurs Glenna Collett-Vare and Babe Ruth which they won quite easily. The match raised $600 for a crippled children's hospital in St. Petersburg, Florida. A number of gallery members were betting which of the "Babes" would hit the longest drive on each hole. Didrikson jokingly said that she could outdrive Ruth standing on one leg.

== Death and legacy ==
Gullickson died on May 7, 1982 at his home in Gulfport, Florida. He is best remembered as an American touring golf professional with a number of good finishes in golf major championships and as the longtime head professional at the Inverness Club in Toledo, Ohio, where he worked for 20 years.

== Professional wins (7) ==
- 1934 Ohio Open
- 1938 Erie Open
- 1945 Toledo Open
- Cleveland Open (three times)
- Cambridge Springs Open

== Results in major championships ==
Tournament	1920	1921	1922	1923	1924	1925	1926	1927	1928	1929	1930	1931	1932	1933	1934	1935	1936	1937	1938	1939	1940	1941
U.S. Open	63		T28				CUT	CUT	CUT		CUT	45	T40								CUT	CUT
PGA Championship	R32			R64														R64				

Note: Gullickson never played in the Masters Tournament or The Open Championship.

Did not play

CUT = missed the half-way cut
T = tied for a place
R64, R32, R16, QF, SF = round in which player lost in PGA Championship match play
