= Bill Johnston (golfer) =

Professional golfer (1925–2021)

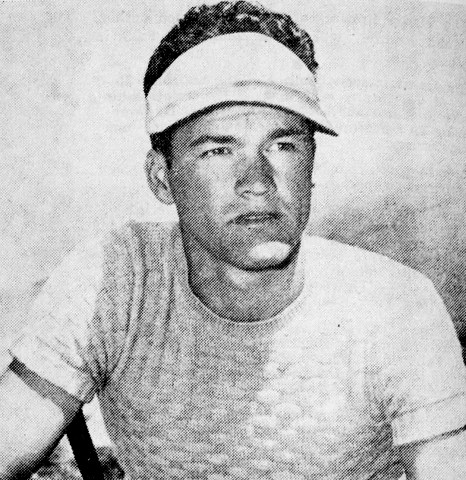
- Johnston, circa 1948

Personal information
- Full name: Clarence William Thompson
- Nationality: United States
- Born: January 2, 1925 Donora, Pennsylvania, U.S.
- Died: April 23, 2021 (aged 96) Idaho, U.S.

Career
- Sport: Golf
- College: University of Utah
- Turned professional: 1950
- Former tours: PGA Tour; Champions Tour
- Professional wins: 15

Number of wins by tour
- PGA Tour: 2
- Other: 13

Best results in major championships
- Masters Tournament: T28: 1957
- PGA Championship: T3: 1956
- U.S. Open: T32: 1963
- The Open Championship: T26: 1960

Clarence William Johnston (January 2, 1925 – April 23, 2021) was an American golf course architect and professional golfer who played on the PGA Tour.

== Early life ==
Johnston was born in Donora, Pennsylvania on January 2, 1925, but moved to Ogden, Utah when he was four years old. Johnston served in the United States Navy. He played college golf at the University of Utah.

== Professional career ==
In 1950, Johnston turned professional. The biggest win of his playing career was at the 1958 Texas Open Invitational.

Johnston played on the Senior PGA Tour from 1980 to 1990 (full-time) and then a few tournaments a year through the 1990s.

After his days as a touring professional were over, Johnston became a golf course architect. He has designed several well-known courses in Arizona and Texas.

== Personal life ==
In November 2020, at the age of 95, Johnston was still playing golf three times a week at the Biltmore Links course with his friends. These regular golf partners included amateurs, professionals, and other close acquaintances.

He was diagnosed with COVID-19 on December 4, 2020, at the Phoenix Mayo Clinic. He died at his son's house in Idaho, on April 23, 2021, at the age of 96.

== Awards and honors ==
- In 1994, Johnston was inducted into the Utah Golf Hall of Fame.
- In 2018, Johnston inducted into the Arizona Golf Hall of Fame.

== Professional wins (15) ==
=== PGA Tour wins (2) ===
No.	Date	Tournament	Winning score	Margin of victory	Runner-up
1	Feb 16, 1958	Texas Open Invitational	−10 (69-71-66-68=274)	3 strokes	(United States) Bob Rosburg
2	Sep 12, 1960	Utah Open Invitational	−22 (66-67-66-63=262)	2 strokes	(United States) Art Wall Jr.

=== Other wins (13) ===
this list may be incomplete

- 1954 Utah Open
- 1958 Sahara Pro-Am
- 1961 Arizona Open
- 1967 Arizona Open
- 1972 Arizona Open, Colorado PGA Championship
- 1973 Colorado Open
- Montana Open - 2 times
- Nevada Open - 4 times

== Courses designed ==
- The Hideout Golf Club, Lake Brownwood, Texas
- The Dominion Country Club, San Antonio, Texas
- The Links at Arizona Biltmore Country Club, Phoenix, Arizona
- Point Hilton Golf Club on Lookout Mountain, Phoenix, Arizona
- Rancho Mañana Golf Club, Cave Creek, Arizona
- Tapatio Springs Resort, Boerne, Texas
- Legacy Ridge Country Club, Bonham, Texas
