= Derek Tolan =

American golfer

Derek Tolan (born October 21, 1985) is a professional golfer and graduate from the University of Colorado Boulder. He is known for having played in the U.S. Open at the age of 16 at Bethpage Black in 2002.

== High school career ==
In 2003, Tolan was the 5A state champ, carding a pair of 69s playing for ThunderRidge Highschool in Highlands Ranch, Colorado. ThunderRidge won the team championship on the first playoff hole over Cherry Creek High School. In 2004, he tied for fourth as a senior in the Colorado state 5A high school championship, five strokes behind teammate Ryan Husted's winning score as ThunderRidge won a third straight team title.

== College career ==
Tolan was named CU's Freshman Male Athlete of the Year for all sports at the school's annual CU Sports Performers of the Year awards. As a sophomore, he was one of two Buffs to play in all five fall tournaments. As a junior, he earned PING All-Central Region honors and had five top-20 and three top-10 finishes in the spring, and earned one of two individual berths into the NCAA. Championship Finals. As a senior, he ended the fall season ranked as the No. 18 player in the nation by GolfStat and the No. 30 man by Golfweek and became the 10th player in school history to win two career tournaments, claiming both in the fall semester, and in doing so set a school record for the lowest stroke average (71.00) for the fall in CU annals.

== Professional wins ==
- 2009 San Juan Open, Colorado Open
- 2012 Colorado Open
