= Southwest PGA =

Professional golf organization

- Sport: Golf
- Founded: 1958; 68 years ago
- Founder: PGA of America
- CEO: Bernie Eaton
- President: Le Ann Finger
- Motto: Serving the Members and Growing the Game
- Country: United States
- Headquarters: Scottsdale, Arizona
- Website: http://www.southwestpga.com

The Southwest Section PGA (Southwest PGA) is a professional golf organization founded in 1958 that is headquartered in Scottsdale, Arizona. The Southwest PGA administers golf tournaments for PGA Members, amateurs and juniors and conducts PGA Tour qualifying events. Based on the number of members and associate members, the Southwest PGA is the 5th largest of the 41 Professional Golfers' Association of America Sections. The largest annual event the Southwest PGA Section conducts is the Arizona Open.

As of 2025, the Section is represented by Dr. Chris Cain on the PGA of America board of directors.

== Chapters ==
The Southwest PGA has two chapters of the Section – the Southern Arizona Chapter of the Southwest PGA and the Southern Nevada Chapter of the Southwest PGA.

The Southern Arizona Chapter of the Southwest PGA was chartered by the Section to provide greater member service to those association members and associates whose facilities are located in the southernmost regions of the Section including Tucson, Arizona.

The Southern Nevada Chapter of the Southwest PGA was chartered by the Section to provide greater member service to those association members and associates whose facilities are located in Clark County including Las Vegas, Nevada.

== Tournaments ==
The Southwest PGA conducts a number of golfing championship events:

- The Southwest PGA Match Play Championship
- The Arizona Open
- The Southwest PGA Championship/PPC
- The Southwest PGA Jr. League Section Championship

== PGA Tour qualifying ==
As of the 2025 season, the Southwest PGA conducts pre-qualifying and Monday qualifying outings for three PGA Tour events:

- WM Phoenix Open
- Shriners Children's Open
- Cologuard Classic

An exemption for the Shriners Hospital Open is given to the winner of a qualifying tournament for Southwest PGA Professionals. Thru 2024, an exemption for the WM Phoenix Open previously went to the winner of the Southwest PGA Championship. The 2023 winner Kim Paez became the first woman to win the Southwest PGA Championship, but was ineligible for the Phoenix Open because Paez played from shorter tees in violation of the Whaley Rule; her spot went to Jesse Mueller.

Due to new PGA Tour policies beginning in 2026, the final WM Phoenix Open qualifier took place on February 3, 2025 at Pinnacle Peak Country Club in Scottsdale. The Southwest PGA has administered the qualifier every year since 1948.

== See also ==
- Ping, an Arizona-based golf manufacturer
