= Bruce Summerhays =

American golfer (born 1944)

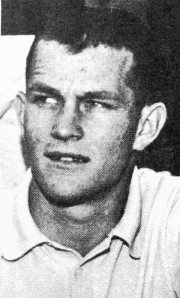
- Summerhays, circa 1966

Personal information
- Full name: Bruce Patton Summerhays
- Nationality: United States
- Born: February 14, 1944 (age 82) St. Louis, Missouri, U.S.
- Height: 5 ft 9 in (1.75 m)
- Weight: 175 lb (79 kg; 12.5 st)

Career
- Sport: Golf
- College: University of Utah
- Turned professional: 1966
- Current tour: Champions Tour
- Professional wins: 7

Number of wins by tour
- PGA Tour Champions: 3
- Other: 4

Best results in major championships
- Masters Tournament: DNP
- PGA Championship: 77th: 1981
- U.S. Open: 65th: 1974
- The Open Championship: DNP

Bruce Patton Summerhays (born February 14, 1944) is an American professional golfer. He served as a mission president for the Church of Jesus Christ of Latter-day Saints in Tampa, Florida.

== Early life and amateur career ==
Summerhays was born in St. Louis, Missouri. He attended the University of Utah.

== Professional career ==
In 1966, Summerhays turned professional. He spent his regular career competing in mainly local events, but as a senior he has competed successfully on the Champions Tour. He has won three Champions Tour events and earned over $9 million in prize money.

== Personal life ==
Summerhays is a member of the Church of Jesus Christ of Latter-day Saints, and says his favorite books are the Book of Mormon and the Bible. He and his wife, Carolyn, are the parents of eight children and have 30 grandchildren.

Summerhays' daughter, Carrie Summerhays Roberts, an All-American golfer at Brigham Young University, played on the LPGA Tour and is now the women's golf coach for BYU. Two of his nephews are also golf professionals; Daniel plays on the Korn Ferry Tour, and Boyd Summerhays played on PGA Tour Canada.

== Professional wins (7) ==
=== Regular wins (4) ===
- 1974 Northern California Open
- 1979 Northern California PGA Championship
- 1991 Utah PGA Championship
- 2008 Utah Open

=== Champions Tour wins (3) ===
No.	Date	Tournament	Winning score	Margin of victory	Runner(s)-up
1	Aug 24, 1997	Saint Luke's Classic	−11 (63-71-65=199)	Playoff	(South Africa) Hugh Baiocchi
2	Jul 5, 1998	State Farm Senior Classic	−10 (69-68-69=206)	1 stroke	(United States) Walter Hall, (United States) Hale Irwin
3	Sep 12, 2004	Kroger Classic	−8 (69-71-68=208)	1 stroke	(United States) Gil Morgan, (United States) Doug Tewell, (United States) Jim Thorpe

Champions Tour playoff record (1–1)

No.	Year	Tournament	Opponent(s)	Result
1	1997	Saint Luke's Classic	(South Africa) Hugh Baiocchi	Won with par on second extra hole
2	1998	Kroger Senior Classic	(South Africa) Hugh Baiocchi, (New Zealand) Bob Charles, (United States) Frank Conner, (United States) Larry Nelson	Baiocchi won with birdie on second extra hole

== U.S. national team appearances ==
- PGA Cup: 1977 (tie), 1978
