= John Black (golfer) =

Scottish golfer

Personal information
- Full name: John Lambie Black
- Nationality: Scotland
- Born: 23 December 1879 Troon, Ayrshire, Scotland
- Died: 29 July 1963 (aged 83) Los Angeles, California

Career
- Sport: Golf
- Status: Professional
- Professional wins: 4

Best results in major championships
- Masters Tournament: DNP
- PGA Championship: DNP
- U.S. Open: T2: 1922
- The Open Championship: DNP

John Lambie Black (23 December 1879 – 29 July 1963) was a Scottish professional golfer.

== Professional career ==
Black finished in a tie for second place with Bobby Jones in the 1922 U.S. Open, a stroke behind Gene Sarazen.

== Personal life ==
In July 1922, Black was involved in an automobile accident that nearly took his life. It was only weeks after his runner-up performance at the U.S. Open.

His younger brother Davie was also a professional golfer.

== Professional wins (4) ==
Note: This list may be incomplete.

- 1919 California State Open
- 1920 California State Open, Northern California Open
- 1930 Northern California PGA Championship

== Results in major championships ==
Tournament	1919	1920	1921	1922	1923
U.S. Open	WD			T2	T26

Note: Black only played in the U.S. Open.

Top 10
Did not play

WD = Withdrew
"T" indicates a tie for a place
