= Smiley Quick =

American professional golfer

Personal information
- Full name: Lyman Loren Quick
- Nickname: Smiley
- Nationality: United States
- Born: March 19, 1909 Centralia, Illinois, U.S.
- Died: December 23, 1979 (aged 70)

Career
- Sport: Golf
- Turned professional: 1948
- Former tour: PGA Tour
- Professional wins: 6

Number of wins by tour
- PGA Tour: 1
- Other: 5

Best results in major championships
- Masters Tournament: T27: 1952
- PGA Championship: DNP
- U.S. Open: T8: 1948
- The Open Championship: DNP

Lyman Loren "Smiley" Quick (March 19, 1909 – December 23, 1979) was an American professional golfer who played on the PGA Tour in the 1940s and 1950s.

== Early life ==
Quick was born in Centralia, Illinois, but lived most of his life in southern California in places like Inglewood and Los Angeles. He served as a combat Marine in World War II.

== Amateur career ==
Quick's best year as an amateur was 1946 when he won the U.S. Amateur Public Links and was runner-up at the U.S. Amateur after missing a putt from 2 1/2 feet at Baltusrol's Lower Course giving Ted Bishop the championship. Quick played on the 1947 Walker Cup team.

== Professional career ==
In 1948, Quick turned professional. As a pro, Quick never lived up to the potential he showed as an amateur; the closest he came to winning on the PGA Tour was when he tied for first with Jack Burke Jr., Sam Snead and Dave Douglas at the 1950 Bing Crosby Pro-Am.

In his later years, he made a living gambling on the golf course with people like Titanic Thompson. Quick hustled boxing great Joe Louis out of a quarter million dollars—enough to buy an apartment in Los Angeles and a fleet of fast cars.

== Amateur wins ==
- 1940 Southern California Golf Association Championship
- 1943 Southern California Golf Association Championship
- 1946 U.S. Amateur Public Links
- 1947 Mexican Amateur

== Professional wins (6) ==
=== PGA Tour wins (1) ===
No.	Date	Tournament	Winning score	Margin of victory	Runner-up
1	Jan 15, 1950	Bing Crosby Pro-Am	−2 (72-69-73=214)	Shared title with (United States) Jack Burke Jr., (United States) Dave Douglas and (United States) Sam Snead	

=== Other wins (5) ===
- 1948 California State Open
- 1949 California State Open
- 1951 Utah Open, Ontario Open (Canada)
- 1955 Northern California Open

== Results in major championships ==
Amateur

Tournament	1946	1947
U.S. Open	T26LA	CUT
U.S. Amateur	2	R128
The Amateur Championship		R128

Professional

Tournament	1948	1949	1950	1951	1952	1953	1954	1955	1956	1957	1958
Masters Tournament					T27						
U.S. Open	T8	CUT		T10	CUT	WD		T16			CUT

Top 10
Did not play

LA = low amateur
CUT = missed the half-way cut
WD = withdrew
"T" indicates a tie for a place
R128, R64, R32, R16, QF, SF = round in which player lost in match play

Source for U.S. Open and U.S. Amateur: USGA Championship Database

Source for 1947 Amateur Championship: The Glasgow Herald, May 28, 1947, pg. 6.

== U.S. national team appearances ==
Amateur

- Walker Cup: 1947 (winners)
