= Coral Springs Open Invitational =

Golf tournament in Florida, U.S.

Tournament information
- Location: Coral Springs, Florida
- Established: 1970
- Course: Coral Springs Country Club
- Par: 71
- Tour: PGA Tour
- Format: Stroke play
- Prize fund: US$125,000
- Month played: December
- Final year: 1970

Tournament record score
- Aggregate: 272 Bill Garrett (1970)
- To par: −12 as above

Final champion
- (United States) Bill Garrett
- Location in the United States Location in Florida

The Coral Springs Open Invitational was a golf tournament on the PGA Tour that was played at the Coral Springs Country Club (now formally known as the Country Club of Coral Springs) in Coral Springs, Florida.

It was played year only, 1970. Bill Garrett, who had never finished better than seventh in his previous five years on tour, won by one shot over Bob Murphy.

== Winner ==
Year	Winner	Score	To par	Margin of victory	Runner-up
1970	(United States) Bill Garrett	272	−12	1 stroke	(United States) Bob Murphy
