= Bill Garrett (golfer) =

American professional golfer (1940–2010)

Personal information
- Full name: William Frank Garrett
- Nationality: United States
- Born: September 6, 1940 Amarillo, Texas, U.S.
- Died: February 25, 2010 (aged 69) Granbury, Texas, U.S.
- Height: 6 ft 6 in (1.98 m)
- Weight: 220 lb (100 kg; 16 st)
- Spouse: Judy Schwan Garrett

Career
- Sport: Golf
- College: North Texas State University
- Turned professional: 1964
- Former tours: PGA Tour; Champions Tour
- Professional wins: 3

Number of wins by tour
- PGA Tour: 1
- Other: 2

Best results in major championships
- Masters Tournament: DNP
- PGA Championship: T55: 1971
- U.S. Open: CUT: 1964, 1966, 1971, 1975, 1981
- The Open Championship: T47: 1975

William Frank Garrett (September 6, 1940 – February 25, 2010) was an American professional golfer. He played on the PGA Tour in the 1960s and 1970s.

== Early life ==
In 1940, Garrett was born in Amarillo, Texas.

At North Texas State University in Denton, Texas, he was captain of the golf team and went to the NCAA semi-finals his senior year. In 1962, he graduated from North Texas.

== Professional career ==
In 1964, Garrett turned professional. After teaching and coaching high school golf, Garrett was a member of the PGA Tour from 1964 to 1979.

In 1970, Garrett won the Coral Springs Open Invitational at Coral Springs Country Club, Florida. He earned $25,000 and defeated Bob Murphy by a stroke. His competitors included Lee Trevino, Julius Boros, and Arnold Palmer, all of whom finished in the top-10.

Garrett played a few times in Europe. His best finish in a major was a tied 47th at the 1975 Open Championship at Carnoustie Golf Links, Scotland. Garrett came back the following year to the 1976 Open Championship and made the cut again, finishing in a tie for 48th. The week after, he played the Scandinavian Enterprise Open, a regular event on the European Tour, where he shot a new 8-under-par course record 64 at Drottningholm G.C. in the third round. The record round advanced Garrett from a T-49th to joint third. He finished in a tie for 4th despite being bothered by a back injury.

=== Senior career ===
As a senior golfer, Garrett played in the PGA Senior Club Professional Championship several times, finishing third in 1993, second in 1994 and tied third in 1995.

Garrett earned a living as a senior club professional after his days as a touring professional were over. He worked for Ping Golf Club Manufacturing for 30 years and was selected Salesman of the Year in 1995. He also received a Distinguished Service Award from the North Texas PGA in 2003.

== Personal life ==
In 1962, he married Judy. They remained married to his death. Garrett was also a deacon at Lakeside Baptist Church.

In 2010, Garrett died in Granbury, Texas.

== Awards and honors ==
- In 1995, he earned Salesman of the Year honors from Ping Golf.
- In 2003, he received a Distinguished Service Award from the North Texas PGA.

== Professional wins (3) ==
=== PGA Tour wins (1) ===
No.	Date	Tournament	Winning score	Margin of victory	Runner-up
1	Dec 6, 1970	Coral Springs Open Invitational	−12 (71-64-68-69=272)	1 stroke	(United States) Bob Murphy

=== Other wins (2) ===
- 1975 Arizona Open
- 1985 Arizona Open
