= Rick Cramer =

American professional golfer (born 1960)

Personal information
- Nationality: United States
- Born: July 19, 1960 (age 66) Independence, Kansas, U.S.
- Height: 6 ft 1 in (1.85 m)
- Weight: 225 lb (102 kg; 16.1 st)

Career
- Sport: Golf
- College: University of Colorado
- Turned professional: 1982
- Former tours: PGA Tour; Nationwide Tour
- Professional wins: 2

Number of wins by tour
- Korn Ferry Tour: 1
- Other: 1

Best results in major championships
- Masters Tournament: DNP
- PGA Championship: DNP
- U.S. Open: CUT: 1985, 1993, 1995, 1997
- The Open Championship: DNP

Rick Cramer (born July 19, 1960) is an American professional golfer.

== Early life and amateur career ==
Cramer was born in Independence, Kansas. He played college golf at the University of Colorado where he was a three-time All-American.

== Professional career ==
Cramer played on the PGA Tour's developmental tour in 1990 and from 1996 to 2001. He won once, at the 1996 Nike Wichita Open, and scored a double eagle at the 1996 Nike Shreveport Open. He played on the PGA Tour in 1986 where his best finish was T-37 at the 1986 Buick Open.

Cramer works for the Gateway Tour as the Arizona Series Tournament Director and Head Rules Official.

== Professional wins (2) ==
=== Nike Tour wins (1) ===
No.	Date	Tournament	Winning score	Margin of victory	Runners-up
1	Aug 18, 1997	Nike Wichita Open	−19 (68-68-66-67=269)	1 stroke	(United States) J. P. Hayes, (United States) Jimmy Johnston, (United States) Craig Kanada

=== Other wins (1) ===
- 1991 Arizona Open

== See also ==
- 1985 PGA Tour Qualifying School graduates
