= Dick Knight (golfer) =

American golfer (1929–1991)

Personal information
- Full name: John Richard Knight
- Nationality: United States
- Born: December 26, 1929 Omaha, Nebraska
- Died: March 25, 1991 (aged 61)
- Height: 5 ft 10 in (1.78 m)
- Weight: 155 lb (70 kg; 11.1 st)

Career
- Sport: Golf
- College: Oklahoma A&M
- Status: Professional
- Former tour: PGA Tour
- Professional wins: 6

Best results in major championships
- Masters Tournament: CUT: 1960
- PGA Championship: T46: 1960
- U.S. Open: 10th: 1959
- The Open Championship: DNP

John Richard Knight (December 26, 1929 – March 25, 1991) was an American professional golfer.

== Career ==
Knight was born in Omaha, Nebraska. He played college golf at Oklahoma A&M.

Knight work as a club pro in Hawaii, where he won the Hawaiian Open and Hawaiian PGA Championship in 1952, in San Diego, California, and at Field Club of Omaha in Omaha, Nebraska. He also played on the PGA Tour. His best finish in a major was 10th at the 1959 U.S. Open. He opened the tournament with a 69 to tie for the lead with Ben Hogan, Dow Finsterwald, and Gene Littler.

== Death ==
Knight died in California of lung cancer. A United States Navy veteran during the Korean War, he was buried in Riverside National Cemetery.

== Amateur wins ==
- 1950 Nebraska Amateur

== Professional wins ==
- 1952 Hawaiian Open, Hawaiian PGA Championship
- 1956 Arizona Open
- 1958 California State Open, Northern California Open
- 1960 Iowa Open
