= 1959 U.S. Open (golf) =

Coordinates: 40.958°N 73.754°W

Tournament information
- Dates: June 11–14, 1959
- Location: Mamaroneck, New York
- Courses: Winged Foot Golf Club, West Course
- Organized by: USGA
- Tour: PGA Tour

Statistics
- Par: 70
- Length: 6,873 yards (6,285 m)
- Field: 147 players, 61 after cut
- Cut: 150 (+10)
- Prize fund: $49,200
- Winner's share: $12,000

Champion
- (United States) Billy Casper
- 282 (+2)

Location in the United States

The 1959 U.S. Open was the 59th U.S. Open, held June 11–14 at the Winged Foot Golf Club in Mamaroneck, New York, a suburb northeast of New York City. Billy Casper won the first of his two U.S. Open titles, a stroke ahead of runner-up Bob Rosburg on the West Course. It was the first of Casper's three major titles, which included the 1966 U.S. Open and the Masters in 1970.

This was the second of six U.S. Opens at Winged Foot's West Course; it previously hosted in 1929, then returned in 1974, 1984, 2006, and 2020. It also hosted the PGA Championship in 1997.

== Course layout ==
Hole	1	2	3	4	5	6	7	8	9	Out	10	11	12	13	14	15	16	17	18	In	Total
Yards	442	415	217	435	524	324	167	438	468	3,430	196	382	540	212	376	417	452	444	424	3,443	6,873
Par	4	4	3	4	5	4	3	4	4	35	3	4	5	3	4	4	4	4	4	35	70

== Final round ==
Casper began the final round with a three-stroke lead over Ben Hogan, age 46, who struggled to a 76 and fell to 8th place. Rosburg made a run at Casper's lead when he holed out a bunker shot for birdie at 11 and made a 50-foot (15 m) putt for another birdie at 12 to draw even with Casper. A three-putt at the 13th meant Rosburg had to birdie the last to force a Monday playoff. His approach shot fell on the front of the green, 40 feet (12 m) short, and he two-putted to finish a stroke back. Casper's final round 74 was enough. The difference for Casper proved to be his putting; he needed only 114 putts over 72 holes with 31 one-putts and just one three-putt.

This U.S. Open was the first to be played over four days; thunderstorms and heavy rain delayed third round play on Saturday morning and the final round was postponed to Sunday. The final round at the U.S. Open was first scheduled for Sunday in 1965.

Charlie Sifford, the pioneering African-American golfer, played in his first major championship, two years before the PGA of America allowed African-Americans to play on the PGA Tour; he finished in 32nd place.

Amateur Jack Nicklaus, 19, played in his third straight U.S. Open but missed the cut for the second time with two rounds of 77. He would place second the following year in 1960 to Arnold Palmer and win the first of his four titles in 1962 in a playoff over Palmer. After 1959, Nicklaus made 25 consecutive cuts at the U.S. Open, through 1984, also at Winged Foot.

== Round summaries ==
=== First round ===
Thursday, June 11, 1959

Place	Player	Score	To Par
T1	(United States) Ben Hogan	69	−1
T1	(United States) Dow Finsterwald	69	−1
T1	(United States) Gene Littler	69	−1
T1	(United States) Dick Knight	69	−1
5	(United States) Hillman Robbins	70	E
T6	(United States) Cary Middlecoff	71	+1
T6	(United States) Arnold Palmer	71	+1
T6	(United States) Billy Casper	71	+1
T6	(South Africa) Gary Player	71	+1
T6	(United States) Don January	71	+1
T6	(United States) Mike Souchak	71	+1
T6	(United States) Lionel Hebert	71	+1
T6	(United States) Ted Kroll	71	+1
T6	(United States) Don Fairfield	71	+1
T6	(United States) Bo Wininger	71	+1

=== Second round ===
Friday, June 12, 1959

Place	Player	Score	To Par
1	(United States) Billy Casper	71-68=139	−1
T2	(United States) Arnold Palmer	71-69=140	E
T2	(South Africa) Gary Player	71-69=140	E
T2	(United States) Ben Hogan	69-71=140	E
T5	(United States) Mike Souchak	71-70=141	+1
T5	(United States) Doug Ford	72-69=141	+1
T7	(United States) Ernie Vossler	72-70=142	+2
T7	(United States) Dow Finsterwald	69-73=142	+2
T9	(United States) Jay Hebert	73-70=143	+3
T9	(United States) Claude Harmon	72-71=143	+3
T9	(United States) Gene Littler	69-74=143	+3

=== Third round ===
Saturday, June 13, 1959

Place	Player	Score	To Par
1	(United States) Billy Casper	71-68-69=208	−2
2	(United States) Ben Hogan	69-71-71=211	+1
T3	(United States) Sam Snead	73-72-67=212	+2
T3	(United States) Bob Rosburg	75-70-67=212	+2
T3	(United States) Arnold Palmer	71-69-72=212	+2
T6	(United States) Claude Harmon	72-71-70=213	+3
T6	(United States) Mike Souchak	71-70-72=213	+3
T6	(United States) Doug Ford	72-69-72=213	+3
9	(United States) Ernie Vossler	72-70-72=214	+4
10	(United States) Lionel Hebert	71-74-70=215	+5

=== Final round ===
Sunday, June 14, 1959

Place	Player	Score	To Par	Money ($)
1	(United States) Billy Casper	71-68-69-74=282	+2	12,000
2	(United States) Bob Rosburg	75-70-67-71=283	+3	6,600
T3	(United States) Claude Harmon	72-71-70-71=284	+4	3,600
T3	(United States) Mike Souchak	71-70-72-71=284	+4	3,600
T5	(United States) Doug Ford	72-69-72-73=286	+6	2,100
T5	(United States) Arnold Palmer	71-69-72-74=286	+6	2,100
T5	(United States) Ernie Vossler	72-70-72-72=286	+6	2,100
T8	(United States) Ben Hogan	69-71-71-76=287	+7	1,350
T8	(United States) Sam Snead	73-72-67-75=287	+7	1,350
10	(United States) Dick Knight	69-75-73-73=290	+10	900
