= Colorado PGA Championship =

The Colorado PGA Championship is a golf tournament that is the championship of the Colorado section of the PGA of America. Fred Wampler, PGA Tour winner of the Los Angeles Open in 1954, and Jack Sommers, club pro and member of the Colorado Golf Hall of Fame, share the record for most victories with four. Other PGA Tour winners who have also won this event include Dale Douglass (3-time PGA Tour winner) and Bill Johnston (2-time PGA Tour winner).

== Winners ==
- 2026 Geoff Keffer
- 2025 Geoff Keffer
- 2024 Tristin Goodwin
- 2023 Micah Rudosky
- 2022 Micah Rudosky
- 2021 Micah Rudosky
- 2020 Geoff Keffer
- 2019 Ron Vlosich
- 2018 Patrick Reidy
- 2017 John Ogden
- 2016 Geoff Keffer
- 2015 Doug Rohrbaugh
- 2014 Doug Rohrbaugh
- 2013 Doug Rohrbaugh
- 2012 Caine Fitzgerald
- 2011 Rob Hunt
- 2010 Chris Johnson
- 2009 Rob Hunt
- 2008 Perry Holmes
- 2007 Matt Call
- 2006 Mike Northern
- 2005 Heikke Nielsen
- 2004 Bill Loeffler
- 2003 Dale Smigelsky
- 2002 Bill Loeffler
- 2001 Micah Rudosky
- 2000 Bill Loeffler
- 1999 Mike Zaremba
- 1998 Ken Krieger
- 1997 Ken Krieger
- 1996 Ken Krieger
- 1995 Jack Sommers
- 1994 Stacey Hart
- 1993 Ron Vlosich
- 1992 Ron Vlosich
- 1991 Ron Vlosich
- 1990 Tom Woodard
- 1989 Gregg Jones
- 1988 Jack Sommers
- 1987 Mike Zaremba
- 1986 Scott Hart
- 1985 Bob Augustine
- 1984 Gregg Jones
- 1983 Dale Douglass
- 1982 Jack Sommers
- 1981 Tim Brauch
- 1980 Jack Sommers
- 1979 Skip Tredway
- 1978 Dow Fitzgerald
- 1977 Steve Satterstrom
- 1976 Pat Rea
- 1975 Rich Bland
- 1974 Fred Wampler
- 1973 Fred Wampler
- 1972 Bill Johnston
- 1971 Dow Fitzgerald
- 1970 Dow Fitzgerald
- 1969 Bob Hold
- 1968 Fred Wampler
- 1967 Bob Hold
- 1966 Fred Wampler
- 1965 Tony Novitisky
- 1964 J. D. Taylor
- 1963 Bob Hold
- 1962 No record
- 1961 No record
- 1960 Bill Bisdorf
- 1959 No record
- 1958 J. D. Taylor
