= 1944 NCAA golf championship =

1944 NCAA Golf Championship
Tournament information
- Location: Toledo, Ohio, U.S.
- Course: Inverness Club

Statistics
- Field: 5 teams

Champion
- Team: Notre Dame; Individual: Louis Lick (Minnesota)
- Team: 311

The 1944 NCAA Golf Championship was the sixth annual NCAA-sanctioned golf tournament to determine the individual and team national champions of men's collegiate golf in the United States. The tournament was held at the Inverness Club in Toledo, Ohio.

Notre Dame claimed the team title, the Fighting Irish's first national championship (at an NCAA-sponsored event). The individual title was won by Louis Lick from Minnesota.

Contested during the midst of World War II, only five teams contested the 1944 tournament, a decrease of two from the seven teams that participated in the previous year's event.

== Team results ==
| Rank | Team | Score |
|---|---|---|
| 1 | Notre Dame | 311 |
| 2 | Minnesota | 312 |
| 3 | Michigan | 318 |
| 4 | Ohio State | 327 |
| 5 | Michigan State College | 344 |

- Note: Defending champions Yale did not qualify.
