= Eddie Loos =

American professional golfer (1893–1950)

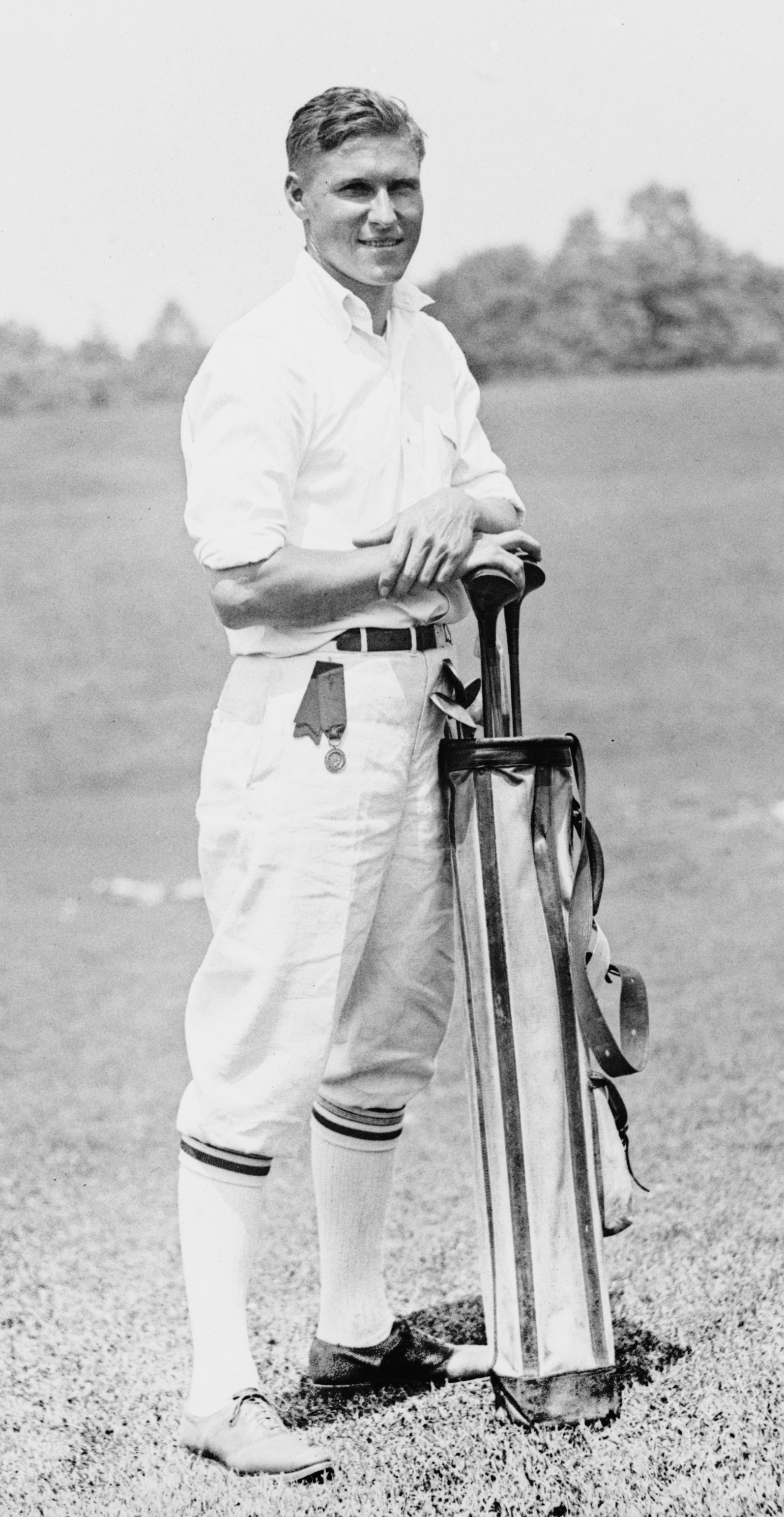
- Loos in 1921

Personal information
- Full name: Edward Wallace Neal Loos
- Nickname: Two-Putt Eddie
- Nationality: United States
- Born: July 31, 1893 New York City, New York, U.S.
- Died: July 9, 1950 (aged 56) Laguna Beach, California, U.S.
- Height: 5 ft 11 in (1.80 m)

Career
- Sport: Golf
- Turned professional: c. 1913
- Former tour: PGA Tour
- Professional wins: 8

Number of wins by tour
- PGA Tour: 3

Best results in major championships
- Masters Tournament: DNP
- PGA Championship: T17: 1919, 1920, 1923, 1934, 1935
- U.S. Open: T10: 1924
- The Open Championship: DNP

Edward Wallace Neal Loos (July 31, 1893 – July 9, 1950) was an American professional golfer who played in the early-to-mid 20th century. His best performance in a major golf championship was a T10 finish in the 1924 U.S. Open. He won the 1917 Shawnee Open, the 1921 California State Open, and the Illinois PGA Championship in 1922 and 1924. Loos was a frequent competitor in the PGA Championship, last playing in 1935. He had 13 second-place finishes on the PGA Tour after 1915.

== Early life ==
Loos was born July 31, 1893, in New York City. He first played golf and also worked as a caddy at the Van Cortlandt Park Golf Course in the Bronx as a teenager.

== Golf career ==
A tall blonde-haired man, Loos was a good putter—seldom three-putting a green—and was sometimes called "Two-Putt Eddie" by the press and fellow players during his playing career. He was the head professional at the Philadelphia Cricket Club in late 1916, taking over for Alex Duncan who left to take a job at the Chicago Golf Club. In 1918 he left the cricket club to join the navy and after the war played exhibition matches with Jim Barnes before moving to Chicago where he was hired at Beverly Country Club. He also worked at a number of other different clubs, including Atlantic City Country Club, Riverton Country Club, Pocono Manor Country Club, Ravisloe Country Club, and Charlotte Country Club. While posted as professional at Pasadena Country Club in March 1921, he won the California State Open beating John Black and Macdonald Smith by 3 and 4 shots, respectively. In the winter in the mid-1920s he worked as professional at the Cleveland Heights Country Club in Lakeland, Florida.

In August 1917 Loos won the Shawnee Open with rounds of 69-74-75-72=290 (+2) beating runner-up Emmett French by seven strokes and won $250—plus $25 for the tournament's low round—and a gold medal. Walter Hagen was third on 298. In September 1917 Loos continued his good play by winning a 36-hole tournament held at Westmoreland Country Club near Chicago. He shot 146 and nipped Bob MacDonald who was a single shot back at 147. In March 1918, Loos came second behind Jim Barnes in the Florida Open. Loos finished sixth in the 1920 Western Open, and in 1922 won the Illinois PGA Championship at Lake Shore Golf Club in Glencoe, Illinois, beating Jock Hutchison. He won the same event again in 1924 at Glen Flora Country Club in Waukegan, Illinois, battling rain and high winds in the process.

On July 20, 1919, Loos partnered with Jim Barnes in a match play event contested at the Donald Ross-designed Beverly Country Club course in Chicago against Jock Hutchison and Bob MacDonald. Loos, playing on what was at the time his home course, shot a 68 after getting off to a slow start. The other cards were: Barnes (73); MacDonald (72); Hutchison (73). Loos and Barnes won the match 4 and 3.

Loos had some bad luck in the 1931 Los Angeles Open. Playing the 71st hole with victory within his grasp, he played a shot from the rough that settled a mere two inches from the hole. As he was preparing to tap in, he looked down and to his chagrin noticed the name "Walter Hagen" stenciled on the ball. He had improperly played Hagen's ball instead of his own and was assessed a two-stroke penalty that gave the title to Ed Dudley. Dudley, however, didn't necessarily win because someone else lost—he shot a 68 in the final round, the best score of the day.

== Death ==
Loos died on July 9, 1950, in Laguna Beach, California. He was found dead in the bathtub of his home. The body was discovered by a neighbor, Dave Topkins. Illness had forced his retirement from golf in 1943.

== Family ==
His son, Charles H. "Chuck" Loos (died 2015), was a former managing editor of the Daily Pilot (formerly the Orange Coast Daily Pilot) newspaper.

== Tournament wins ==
=== PGA Tour wins (3) ===
- 1917 Shawnee Open
- 1922 Illinois PGA Championship
- 1923 Southern California Open

=== Other wins (5) ===
Note: This list may be incomplete.

- 1917 Westmoreland Country Club Tournament
- 1921 California State Open, Northern California Open
- 1923 St. Joseph Tournament
- 1924 Illinois PGA Championship

== Results in major championships ==
Tournament	1919	1920	1921	1922	1923	1924	1925	1926	1927	1928	1929	1930	1931	1932	1933	1934	1935
U.S. Open	?	T17	12	15		T10		T37	T11	T36			CUT			T25	CUT
PGA Championship	R32	R32			R32											R32	R32

Note: Loos never played in the Masters Tournament or The Open Championship.

Top 10
Did not play

? = unknown
CUT = missed the half-way cut
R32, R16, QF, SF = round in which player lost in PGA Championship match play
"T" indicates a tie for a place
