= California State Open =

Golf tournament in California, US

The California State Open is the California state open golf tournament, open to both amateur and professional golfers. It is organized by the Southern California section of the PGA of America. It was first played in 1900 and has been played at a variety of courses around the state. It was considered a PGA Tour event in the 1920s and 1930s.

== Winners ==
- 2026 Isaac Rodea
- 2025 Joey Vrzich
- 2024 Danny List
- 2023 Rak Cho
- 2022 Jin Zihao
- 2021 Matt Wilson
- 2020 No tournament
- 2019 Josh Anderson
- 2018 Andre de Decker
- 2017 David Gazzolo
- 2016 David Gazzolo
- 2015 Bryan Martin
- 2014 Chris Gilman
- 2013 Ray Beaufils
- 2012 Hyunseok Lim
- 2011 John Ellis
- 2010 Michael McCabe
- 2009 Mark Warman
- 2008 Kyle Thurston
- 2007 Drew Scott
- 2006 Ji Hwan Park (amateur)
- 2005 Eric Meichtry
- 2004 Jason Gore
- 2003 John Wilson
- 2002 No tournament
- 2001 Michael Block
- 2000 Rich Barcelo
- 1999 Todd Fischer
- 1998 Todd Demsey
- 1997 Jason Gore (amateur)
- 1996 Dennis Paulson
- 1995 Kevin Burton
- 1994 Jeff Bari
- 1993 Clinton Whitelaw
- 1992 Mark Wurtz
- 1991 Kirk Triplett
- 1990 Dennis Paulson
- 1989 Brad Bell
- 1988 Jim Woodward
- 1987 John Flannery
- 1986 Jim Woodward
- 1985 Brad Greer
- 1984 Greg Twiggs
- 1983 Brett Upper
- 1982 John McComish
- 1981 Jeff Sanders
- 1980 Tim Norris
- 1979 Jim Petralia
- 1978 Rex Caldwell
- 1977 Ron Hoyt
- 1976 Bill Brask
- 1975 Jimmy Powell
- 1974 Roger Maltbie
- 1973 Mike Brannan
- 1972 Steve Oppermann
- 1971 Greg Trompas
- 1970 Terry Small
- 1969 Terry Small
- 1968 Ron Reif
- 1967 Chuck Green
- 1966 Pinky Stevenson
- 1965 Bud Holscher
- 1964 Lee Raymond
- 1963 Jack O'Keefe
- 1962 Ron Lettelier
- 1961 Duff Lawrence
- 1960 Bud Holscher
- 1959 Jerry Barber
- 1958 Dick Knight
- 1957 Eric Monti
- 1956 Art Bell
- 1955 Ralph Blomquist
- 1954 Gene Littler
- 1953 No tournament
- 1952 Lloyd Mangrum
- 1951 Zell Eaton
- 1950 Dutch Harrison
- 1949 Smiley Quick
- 1948 Smiley Quick
- 1947 Art Bell
- 1946 Tal Smith
- 1945 George Fazio
- 1944 Ernie Piper
- 1943 Grant Leonard
- 1942 Johnny Dawson
- 1941 Mark Fry
- 1940 Olin Dutra
- 1939 Art Bell
- 1938 George Von Elm
- 1937 Fred Morrison
- 1936 Fred Morrison
- 1935 Cam Puget
- 1934 Horton Smith
- 1933 Leo Diegel
- 1932 Fred Morrison
- 1931 Leo Diegel
- 1930 Jack Terron
- 1928–29 No tournament
- 1927 Willie Hunter
- 1926 Willie Hunter
- 1925 Macdonald Smith
- 1924 Macdonald Smith
- 1923 Joe Kirkwood, Sr.
- 1922 Jim Barnes
- 1921 Eddie Loos
- 1920 John Black
- 1919 John Black
- 1916–18 No tournament
- 1915 Walter Hagen
- 1901–14 No tournament
- 1900 Willie Smith
