= Utah PGA Championship =

The Utah PGA Championship is a golf tournament that is the championship of the Utah section of the PGA of America. The Utah section was formed in 1986, and the tournament has been played annually since that time. Kim Thompson, a Utah club pro, holds the record for most wins with four. Bruce Summerhays and Bob Betley, both of whom have victories on the Champions Tour, have won this tournament.

== Winners ==
- 2026 Zach J. Johnson
- 2025 Chris Moody
- 2024 Dustin Volk
- 2023 Tommy Sharp
- 2022 Mark Owen
- 2021 Matt Baird
- 2020 Joe Summerhays
- 2019 Zach J. Johnson
- 2018 Zach J. Johnson
- 2017 Tommy Sharp
- 2016 Tele Wightman
- 2015 Matt Baird
- 2014 Dustin Volk
- 2013 Chris Moody
- 2012 Mark Owen
- 2011 Dustin Volk
- 2010 Matt Baird
- 2009 Ryan Rhees
- 2008 Steve Schneiter
- 2007 Mark Owen
- 2006 Kury Reynolds
- 2005 Kury Reynolds
- 2004 Stephen Schneiter
- 2003 James Blair
- 2002 Henry White
- 2001 Matt Johnson
- 2000 Kim Thompson
- 1999 Stephen Schneiter
- 1998 Milan Swilor
- 1997 Kim Thompson
- 1996 Tom Costello
- 1995 Kim Thompson
- 1994 Kim Thompson
- 1993 Stephen Schneiter
- 1992 Milan Swilor
- 1991 Bruce Summerhays
- 1990 Milan Swilor
- 1989 James Blair
- 1988 Mike Malaska
- 1987 Mike Malaska
- 1986 Bob Betley
