= Inverness Club =

Private golf club in Toledo, Ohio

- Interactive map of Inverness Club

Club information
- Location: Toledo, Ohio
- Established: February 23, 1903; 123 years ago
- Type: Private
- Total holes: 18
- Tournaments: U.S. Open (1920, 1931, 1957, 1979); PGA Championship (1986, 1993); U.S. Amateur (1973); U.S. Senior Open (2003, 2011); U.S. Junior Amateur (2019); Solheim Cup (2021); NCAA Men's Championship (1944, 2009)
- Website: Inverness Club
- Designed by: Donald Ross
- Par: 71
- Length: 7,730 yards (7,068 m)
- Course rating: 78.4
- Slope rating: 151
- Inverness Club
- U.S. National Register of Historic Places
- U.S. Historic district
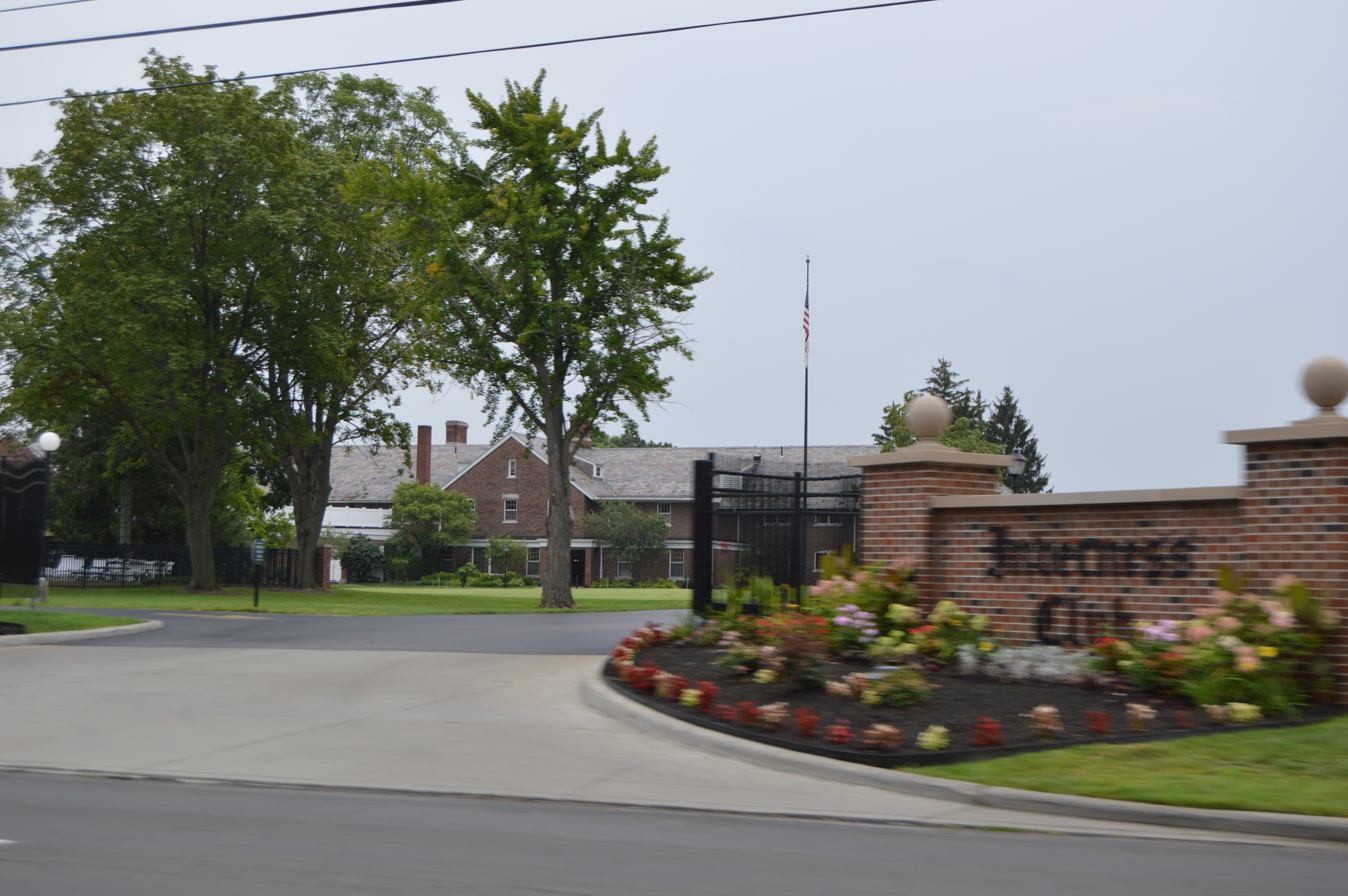
- Main building, as seen from Dorr Street

- Location within Ohio Location within the United States
- Location: 4601 Dorr Street in Toledo, Ohio
- Coordinates: 41°38′47″N 83°39′1″W
- Area: 203 acres (82.2 ha)
- Built: 1919
- Architect: Ross, Donald; Devore Company
- Architectural style: Bungalow/Craftsman, Tudor Revival
- NRHP reference No.: 93000398
- Added to NRHP: May 10, 1993

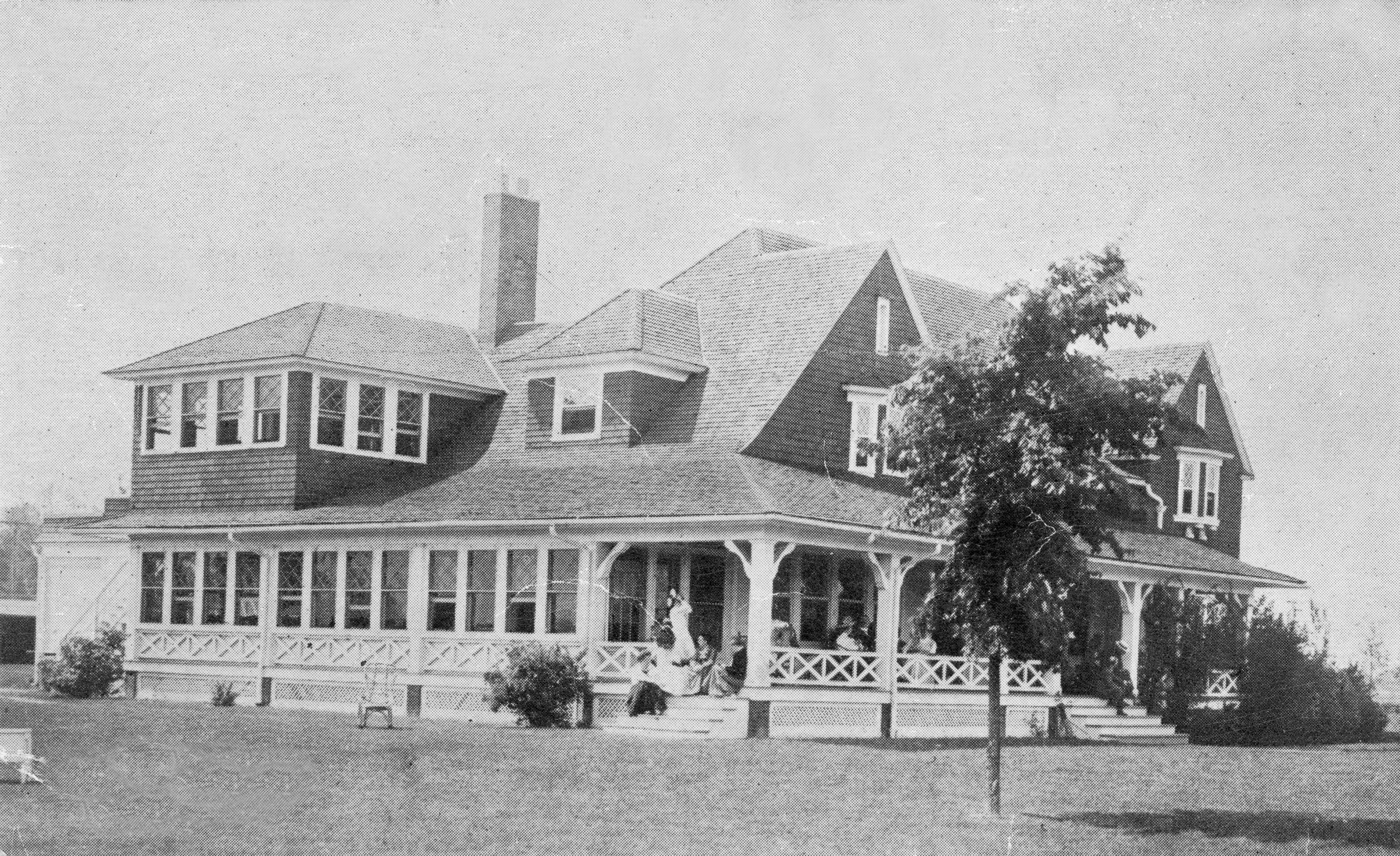
Inverness Club, 1910

Inverness Club is a private golf club in Toledo, Ohio.

Opened in 1903, the club has as of now hosted four U.S. Opens, two PGA Championships, two NCAA Men's Championships, and the Solheim Cup. Inverness is the only club to have hosted the U.S. Open, U.S. Amateur, U.S. Senior Open, and U.S. Junior Amateur. From 1935 to 1954, it also hosted the Inverness Invitational Four-Ball. It is slated to host the 2027 U.S. Women's Open and the 2029 U.S. Amateur. On February 28, 2026 the USGA announced the course would host 2033 U.S. Girls' Junior, 2036 U.S. Girls' Junior, and 2045 U.S. Open

Byron Nelson, who served as the club's head golf professional from 1940 to 1944, considered it his "home course." S.P. Jermain, the club's founder and first Board President, conceived the Ryder Cup. The championship course was designed by architect Donald Ross.

== History ==
Inverness was founded in 1903, when many of Toledo's wealthiest citizens purchased a parcel of land and built a nine-hole golf course. The course was eventually expanded to 18 holes. In 1916, the club hired Donald Ross to construct a championship-caliber golf course, in which was finished by the end of 1918. In his unpublished book, Golf Has Never Failed Me, Ross discussed the design of Inverness and only six other courses, out of the hundreds he designed.

Before 1920 in the United States, golf professionals were prohibited from entering country clubs' clubhouses, because they were seen as little more than servants to the club members. As the professional golf tournaments began to appear in the early part of the 20th century, the visiting pros were treated the same as the home pros.

By 1920, attitudes had begun to change. Sylvanus Pierre Jermain, "the father of public golf in Toledo", lobbied the USGA and the members of Inverness to allow all players, including pros, into the clubhouse at the upcoming 1920 U.S. Open. Both parties agreed, and Inverness thus became the first golf club in the U.S. to allow pros in the clubhouse.

When the U.S. Open returned to Inverness in 1931, Walter Hagen gathered other professional golfers to purchase a gift for the club in gratitude for its pioneering stance. They bought a grandfather clock that still stands in the clubhouse, with a brass plate inscribed:

God measures men by what they are
Not by what they in wealth possess
This vibrant message chimes afar
The voice of Inverness

Byron Nelson was the head professional at Inverness Club from 1940 to 1944. He considered Inverness his home course and credits his time there for his record breaking performance, winning 18 of 35 PGA tournaments including 11 in a row, in 1945. Lloyd Gullickson became the head professional at Inverness Club, succeeding Nelson. Gullickson remained at Inverness as the head professional until his retirement in 1965. Herman Lang, who was the first assistant to Nelson in 1941, was the head pro from 1966-1980.

In preparation for championships, the course has been renovated four times. In 2016, Inverness Club engaged golf course architect Andrew Green, who carefully researched original drawings and historic photography to restore the artistry of Ross's design. In addition, Green modernized tee boxes and bunkering systems that are fitting to today's championship courses. Green's design has restored Ross's classic championship design, with Inverness Club now playing over 7,700 yards.

Inverness has been ranked in the top 100 golf courses in the United States every year since Golf Digest has released rankings, ranked #62. Inverness is ranked in the top 100 world rankings by Golf Magazine, ranked #67 in the World for 2025-2026. and ranked #48 on Golfweek Magazine's America's Top 200 Classic Courses.

== Tournaments ==
Winners of major tournaments held at Inverness Club include:

U.S. Open

- 1920 – Ted Ray
- 1931 – Billy Burke (holds records: winning score 589, 144 holes)
- 1957 – Dick Mayer
- 1979 – Hale Irwin

U.S. Amateur

- 1973 – Craig Stadler

PGA Championship

- 1986 – Bob Tway
- 1993 – Paul Azinger

U.S. Senior Open

- 2003 – Bruce Lietzke
- 2011 – Olin Browne

U.S. Junior Amateur

- 2019 – Preston Summerhays

Solheim Cup

- 2021 – Europe

Future championships

- 2027 U.S. Women's Open
- 2029 U.S. Amateur
- 2033 U.S. Girls' Junior
- 2036 U.S. Women's Amateur
- 2045 U.S. Open

NCAA Men's Golf Championship Results

- 1944 Team: Notre Dame & Individual: Louis Lick Minnesota
- 2009 Team: Texas A&M & Individual: Matt Hill, NC State

== Scorecard ==
Inverness Club
Tee	Rating/Slope	1	2	3	4	5	6	7	8	9	Out	10	11	12	13	14	15	16	17	18	In	Total
Black	78.4/151	399	487	274	516	172	534	481	607	464	3,934	387	378	229	556	482	472	451	483	358	3,796	7,730
Gold	74.9/146	392	439	240	430	164	455	456	570	367	3,513	370	378	170	519	450	440	408	411	331	3,477	6,990
Silver	M:72.0/137 W:78.6/146	387	394	197	385	141	430	434	522	344	3,234	345	368	152	495	420	417	393	411	305	3,306	6,540
Blue	M:69.6/133 W:76.3/140	369	350	161	346	118	385	387	522	305	2,943	333	368	141	495	390	389	393	346	305	3,160	6,103
White	M:65.8/122 W:71.5/131	286	350	161	297	103	348	360	448	274	2,627	205	268	111	428	307	367	284	346	262	2,578	5,205
Par		4	4	3	4	3	4	4	5	4	35	4	4	3	5	4	4	4	4	4	36	71
