= 1922 U.S. Open (golf) =

Coordinates: 42.128°N 87.762°W

Tournament information
- Dates: July 14–15, 1922
- Location: Glencoe, Illinois
- Course: Skokie Country Club
- Organized by: USGA
- Format: Stroke play − 72 holes

Statistics
- Par: 70
- Length: 6,548 yards (5,987 m)
- Field: 78
- Cut: none
- Prize fund: $1,725
- Winner's share: $500

Champion
- (United States) Gene Sarazen
- 288 (+8)

Location in the United States
Location in Illinois

The 1922 U.S. Open was the 26th U.S. Open, held July 14–15 at Skokie Country Club in Glencoe, Illinois, a suburb north of Chicago. Gene Sarazen won the first of his seven major championships, one stroke ahead of runners-up John Black and 20-year-old amateur Bobby Jones.

Walter Hagen, the winner of the British Open three weeks earlier, opened with 68 to take a three-shot lead over Black on Friday morning. In the second round that afternoon, Black shot a 71 to take a two-stroke lead over Bill Mehlhorn, with Hagen and Sarazen another stroke back.

Jones had an even-par 70 in the third round to take a share of the 54-hole lead with Mehlhorn, while Black's 75 left him one behind. The leaders could not contend with Sarazen's brilliant play in the final round, recording a two-putt birdie on the finishing hole for a 68 and 288 total. Black needed to par the final two holes to force a playoff, but his tee shot on 17 went out of bounds and led to a double bogey. Needing an eagle on the par-5 18th to tie, Black's second shot landed ten feet (3 m) from the pin, but in a greenside bunker. When he failed to hole out from the sand, Sarazen clinched the title.

Sarazen, age 20, became the fourth American-born champion of the U.S. Open, joining John McDermott, Francis Ouimet, and Hagen. He won a second U.S. Open ten years later in 1932.

== Course layout ==
Hole	1	2	3	4	5	6	7	8	9	Out	10	11	12	13	14	15	16	17	18	In	Total
Yards	430	198	440	350	590	390	215	435	185	3,228	440	430	345	185	315	340	365	430	470	3,320	6,548
Par	4	3	4	4	5	4	3	4	3	34	4	4	5	3	4	4	4	4	5	36	70

== Round summaries ==
=== First round ===
Friday, July 14, 1922 (morning)

Place	Player	Score	To par
1	(United States) Walter Hagen	68	−2
2	(Scotland) John Black	71	+1
T3	(Scotland) Laurie Ayton, Snr	72	+2
T3	(United States) Chick Evans (a)	72	+2
T3	(United States) Gene Sarazen	72	+2
T6	(United States) Mike Brady	73	+3
T6	(United States) Johnny Farrell	73	+3
T6	(United States) Bob MacDonald	73	+3
T6	(United States) Bill Mehlhorn	73	+3
T6	(United States) Al Watrous	73	+3

=== Second round ===
Friday, July 14, 1922 (afternoon)

Place	Player	Score	To par
1	(Scotland) John Black	71-71=142	+2
2	(United States) Bill Mehlhorn	73-71=144	+4
T3	(United States) Walter Hagen	68-77=145	+5
T3	(United States) Gene Sarazen	72-73=145	+5
5	(United States) Bobby Jones (a)	74-72=146	+6
6	(United States) Lloyd Gullickson (a)	77-70=147	+7
T7	(Scotland) Laurie Ayton, Snr	72-76=148	+8
T7	(United States) Mike Brady	73-75=148	+8
T7	(United States) Chick Evans (a)	72-76=148	+8
T10	(England) Jim Barnes	74-75=149	+9
T10	(Scotland) George Duncan	76-73=149	+9
T10	(United States) Johnny Farrell	73-76=149	+9
T10	(United States) Bob MacDonald	73-76=149	+9

=== Third round ===
Saturday, July 15, 1922 (morning)

Place	Player	Score	To par
T1	(United States) Bobby Jones (a)	74-72-70=216	+6
T1	(United States) Bill Mehlhorn	73-71-72=216	+6
T3	(Scotland) John Black	71-71-75=217	+7
4	(United States) Walter Hagen	68-77-74=219	+9
5	(United States) Gene Sarazen	72-73-75=220	+10
T6	(United States) Chick Evans (a)	72-76-74=222	+12
T6	(United States) Mike Brady	73-75-74=222	+12
8	(United States) Jock Hutchison	78-74-71=223	+13
9	(Scotland) George Duncan	76-73-75=224	+14
T10	(England) Jim Barnes	74-75-77=226	+16
T10	(United States) Leo Diegel	77-76-73=226	+16

=== Final round ===
Saturday, July 15, 1922 (afternoon)

Place	Player	Score	To par	Money ($)
1	(United States) Gene Sarazen	72-73-75-68=288	+8	500
T2	(Scotland) John Black	71-71-75-72=289	+9	300
T2	(United States) Bobby Jones (a)	74-72-70-73=289	+9	0
4	(United States) Bill Mehlhorn	73-71-72-74=290	+10	200
5	(United States) Walter Hagen	68-77-74-72=291	+11	150
6	(Scotland) George Duncan	76-73-75-72=296	+16	100
7	(United States) Leo Diegel	77-76-73-71=297	+17	90
T8	(United States) Mike Brady	73-75-74-76=298	+18	73
T8	(United States) Johnny Golden	73-77-77-71=298	+18	73
T8	(United States) Jock Hutchison	78-74-71-75=298	+18	73

(a) denotes amateur

=== Scorecard ===
Final round

Hole	1	2	3	4	5	6	7	8	9	10	11	12	13	14	15	16	17	18
Par	4	3	4	4	5	4	3	4	3	4	4	4	3	4	4	4	4	5
(United States) Sarazen	+10	+11	+10	+9	+10	+10	+9	+9	+9	+10	+10	+9	+9	+9	+9	+9	+9	+8
(Scotland) Black	+7	+7	+7	+7	+7	+6	+6	+5	+6	+7	+7	+7	+7	+8	+8	+8	+10	+9
(United States) Jones	+6	+6	+7	+7	+8	+8	+8	+8	+8	+9	+9	+10	+10	+10	+10	+10	+10	+9
(United States) Mehlhorn	+7	+7	+7	+7	+8	+9	+9	+10	+10	+10	+10	+10	+11	+10	+10	+10	+10	+10
(United States) Hagen	+9	+8	+9	+9	+9	+9	+9	+10	+10	+10	+10	+10	+10	+10	+11	+11	+12	+11

Cumulative tournament scores, relative to par
