= Philip Francis (golfer) =

American professional golfer

Philip C. Francis is an American professional golfer.

Francis was born in Las Vegas, Nevada. He was one of the top-ranked junior golfers in the class of 2007, winning more than 140 junior events, to include the 2006 U.S. Junior Amateur. He was ranked number one in junior golf for 65 straight weeks. Francis first picked up a golf club at 18 months old and won for the first time at age four in an eight and under event. He also broke Tiger Woods' record by winning four consecutive Junior World Golf Championships (1999–2002).

Francis played in the 2007 Stanford St. Jude Championship, John Deere Classic, and U.S. Bank Championship in Milwaukee, all on the PGA Tour, but failed to make the cut. In July 2008, he made the cut in a PGA Tour event for the first time at the John Deere Classic.

Francis played college golf at UCLA for two years. He transferred to Arizona State University for the fall semester of 2009. In accordance with Pac-10 rules, he red-shirted his junior season and was eligible to play on their golf team for the 2010–2011 season.

Francis turned professional in the summer of 2011.

== U.S. national team appearances ==
Amateur

- Junior Ryder Cup: 2006
