= Norman G. Barrier =

American historian and Indologist

Norman Gerald Barrier, popularly known as Jerry Barrier, (22 August 1940 – 6 June 2010) was an American historian, author, and Indologist, known for writing on Punjab related topics including the Punjab Land Alienation Act, 1900, Sikhism, Arya Samaj, and History of Hinduism.

Barrier began his academic career teaching at Northern Illinois University before joining the University of Missouri in Columbia, where he taught for 37 years.

== Selected publications ==
- Aspects of India : Essays in Honor of Edward Cameron Dimock, Jr., edited by Margaret Case and N. Gerald Barrier. New Delhi: Manohar Publications for American Institute of Indian Studies, 1986. ISBN 978-81-85054-07-0
- British Imperial Policy in India and Sri Lanka, 1858-1912: A Reassessment / editors, Robert I. Crane and N. Gerald Barrier. New Delhi: Heritage Publishers, [1981]
- The Census in British India: New Perspectives, edited with an introduction by N. Gerald Barrier. New Delhi: Manohar, 1981.
