= Larry Webb =

England international rugby union player

- Full name: St Lawrence Hugh Webb
- Born: 7 March 1931 Melbourne, Australia
- Died: 30 May 1978 (aged 47) at sea
- School: St George's School

Rugby union career
- Position: Prop
International career
Years	Team	Apps	(Points)
1959	England	4	(0)

St Lawrence Hugh Webb (7 March 1931 – 30 May 1978) was an English international rugby union player.

Born in Melbourne, Australia, Webb was the son of a property developer who owned the Chequers Cinema in St Albans, Hertfordshire, and grew up in the village of Redbourn. He attended St George's School in Harpenden.

Webb played over 300 games for Bedford and was capped by England four times as a prop in the 1959 Five Nations.

A wealthy businessman, Webb made considerable money selling his plant hire firm to Bovis Construction. He died in 1978, piloting a Bell 206 helicopter that crashed at sea on the way back from Le Touquet, at the age of 47.

== See also ==
- List of England national rugby union players
