= 1916 PGA Championship =

Tournament information
- Dates: October 10–14, 1916
- Location: Eastchester, New York; 40.941°N 73.813°W
- Course: Siwanoy Country Club
- Organized by: PGA of America
- Tour: PGA Tour
- Format: Match play

Statistics
- Field: 32 players
- Prize fund: $2,580
- Winner's share: $500

Champion
- (England) Jim Barnes
- def. (Scotland) Jock Hutchison, 1 up
- Location in the United States Location in New York

The 1916 PGA Championship was the first PGA Championship, which is now considered one of golf's major championships. It was held October 10–14 at Siwanoy Country Club in Eastchester, New York, just north of New York City in Westchester County.

Jim Barnes defeated Jock Hutchison by 1 hole in the 36-hole final, holing a 4-foot putt at the final hole.

== Format ==
The format of the event closely followed that of the News of the World Match Play tournament which had been organized by the British PGA since 1903, although it had not been played since 1913 because of World War I. The main difference was that the tournament was played over 5 days with all matches contested over 36 holes, whereas matches in the News of the World Match Play were over 18 holes except for the final, the event being completed in 3 days.

The field of 32 golfers qualified through sectional tournaments. They competed in 36-hole match play rounds from October 10 to 14 in a single-elimination tournament, the draw being made on October 6. Extra holes were played in the event of a tied match.

== Qualification ==
Entry was restricted to members of the PGA of America. Qualification was by a series of 36-hole stroke-play competitions; one for each of the seven PGA sections. The number of qualifiers in each event was proportional to the number of members of that section. The Metropolitan section had 12 qualifiers, the Middle West section 7, the Southeast section 5, the New England section 3, the Central section 2, the North and Southwest section 2, and the Pacific section 1. In the event of a tie for places there was a playoff.

Qualifying events:

- September Pacific section: Charles G. Adams won by 8 strokes on 139.
- September 13 Southeastern section at Wilmington Country Club: Jim Barnes and Jock Hutchison tied on 147. James R. Thomson and Charles Hoffner tied for the final place on 151. Barnes and Hutchison had a 9-hole playoff the following day to decide the winner, Hutchison taking the medal by a stroke with a score of 38. Thomson and Hoffner had an 18-hole playoff for the final place, Thomson winning with a score of 75 to Hoffner's 76.
- September 18 New England section at Worcester Country Club: Mike Brady won by 11 strokes with a score of 147. Louis Tellier, Jack Gordon and George Gordon tied for the last place on 159. In the 18-hole playoff Tellier scored 76, Jack Gordon 79 and George Gordon 81.
- September 18 Middle West section at the Glen View Club: George Simpson won by 6 strokes with a score of 147.
- September 29 Metropolitan section at Inwood Country Club: Willie Macfarlane and James West tied on a score of 153.
- October Central section at the Algonquin Golf Club:
- North and Southwest section: details not known.

Following the completion of qualifying one of the two qualifiers from the North and Southwest section withdrew. An extra place was allocated to the Metropolitan section. A playoff was arranged on October 4 at Englewood Golf Club between Jack Dowling, Clarence Hackney and Macdonald Smith who had tied for 13th place in the qualifying event on September 29. Smith arrived too late to play and Dowling beat Hackney by a score of 147 to 165 over 36 holes.

The qualifiers were:

- Pacific section: Charles G. Adams
- Southeastern section: Jim Barnes, Emmet French, Jock Hutchison, Wilfrid Reid, James R. Thomson
- New England section: Mike Brady, Louis Tellier, Eddie Towns
- Middle West section: Jim Donaldson, George Fotheringham, Walter Fovargue, Robert McNulty, J. J. O'Brien, George Simpson, Cyril Walker
- Metropolitan section: Jack Dowling, James Ferguson, Walter Hagen, Jack Hobens, Tom Kerrigan, Bob MacDonald, Willie Macfarlane, George McLean, Tom McNamara, Joe Mitchell, Jack Pirie, Alex Smith, James West
- Central section: William Brown, Fred Clarkson
- North and Southwest section: Mike Shearman

== Tournament summary ==
=== First round ===
Two of the 32 qualifiers did not attend: Fred Clarkson from Kansas City and Mike Shearman from Sioux City. Their opponents received a bye to the second round. One of the surprises was the 6 and 5 victory of George McLean over Tom McNamara, runner-up in the 1915 U.S. Open. Wilfrid Reid lost by 1 hole to J. J. O'Brien, the only match that went to the final hole.

=== Second round ===
The biggest surprise of the round was the defeat of Mike Brady by Willie Macfarlane. Macfarlane led by one hole after the first round but the match was level after 27 holes. Brady took the lead at the 10th hole but Macfarlane then had five threes in the next six holes and won the match 3 and 2.

In the lower half of the draw, Bob MacDonald led Walter Hagen by two holes after the morning round but Hagen played better in the afternoon and won 3 and 2. Jock Hutchison had a comfortable 11 and 9 win against William Brown.

=== Quarter-final ===
Jim Barnes beat Tom Kerrigan, the local professional, 3 and 1. The match was level at lunchtime but Barnes then won the 2nd and 5th and was 2 up after 9 holes in the afternoon. Kerrigan won the 11th but Barnes won the next to lead by 2 again. Barnes won the match with a birdie 3 at the 17th hole. Willie Macfarlane beat Jack Dowling 2 and 1. Macfarlane led by 3 holes in the morning but Dowling had levelled the match by the 10th hole of the afternoon round. Macfarlane won the 13th with a birdie 2 and the 16th with a 3, winning the match by halving the 17th.

Walter Hagen beat J. J. O'Brien 10 and 9. Hagen took an early 2 hole lead but O'Brien levelled the match at the 7th. Hagen then won 9 of the next 11 holes to be 9 up after the morning round. In the last match Jock Hutchison beat Cyril Walker 4 and 3. Hutchison was 2 up after the first round and was dormie 5 after 13 holes of the afternoon. Walker won the 14th but a half at the 15th gave the match of Hutchison.

=== Semi-final ===
The semi-finals saw the defeat of the last two remaining qualifiers from the Metropolitican section, Willie Macfarlane and Walter Hagen.

Jim Barnes met Willie Macfarlane in the first semi-final. Barnes took an early lead and was 3 up after 5 holes. Macfarlane won the next two holes but Barnes extended the lead to 4 holes at the end of the morning round. Barnes then won the first two holes in the afternoon, to lead by 6 holes and he eventually won the match 6 and 5.

Jock Hutchison and Walter Hagen met in the other semi-final. Hutchison took an early lead, being two up after 9 holes. Hagen won the 10th, 11th and 13th and led by one hole after the first round. Hagen was still one up after 11 holes in the afternoon but played poorly at the 12th and 13th, Hutchison taking the lead in the match. Hagen made a birdie 3 at the 14th hole to level the match but lost the 16th after a bogey 5. At the 17th Hagen had a putt to level the match but missed it. Needing to win the final hole Hagen put his second shot into a ditch and later conceded the hole.

=== Final ===
In the Saturday final, Jim Barnes defeated Jock Hutchison by 1 hole to be the first holder of the Wanamaker trophy. He also won $500 and a diamond studded gold medal. Barnes and Hutchison had both qualified through the Southeast section where they had tied for the leading score. On that occasion Hutchison had beaten Barnes in a 9-hole playoff to decide the winner. Barnes was the professional at Whitemarsh Valley Country Club, north of Philadelphia while Hutchison represented Allegheny Country Club, northwest of Pittsburgh.

Hutchison made a good start to the final, being 4 up after 8 holes. He had won the 2nd, 3rd, 6th and 8th holes and taken just 31 strokes for the first eight holes. Hutchison then went over the green at the 9th, losing to a par 4. Barnes also won the 13th and 15th and was only 1 hole down after the morning round.

In the afternoon Barnes levelled the match with a par 3 at the 3rd hole and took the lead for the first time with a birdie 3 at the 7th hole. The 9th hole was halved with both players making birdie 3s but Barnes went two up with another birdie at the 10th hole. Hutchison won the 11th hole after Barnes missed a short putt, his first winning hole since the 8th of the morning round. Hutchison then won the 13th hole with a par 3 to level the match and went ahead again at the 15th after another bogey from Barnes. The 16th was halved but Hutchison found a bunker at the 17th, made a bogey 5, and the match was all square. Both players struggled on the par-5 18th and each was about four feet from the hole after four strokes. A measurement was needed to determine who putted first and Barnes was an inch closer. Hutchison missed his putt but Barnes holed his, to win the match.

== Results ==
First round October 10
Tom Kerrigan	6&4
Charles G. Adams
George McLean	6&5
Tom McNamara
Alex Smith	4&2
James Ferguson
George Fotheringham
Jim Barnes	8&7
Willie Macfarlane	10&9
Robert McNulty
Mike Brady	7&6
James West
Jack Dowling	3&2
Jack Pirie
Emmet French	3&1
Eddie Towns
Wilfrid Reid
J. J. O'Brien	1up
George Simpson	6&5
Walter Fovargue
Jim Donaldson
Bob MacDonald	3&2
James R. Thomson
Walter Hagen	7&6
Jock Hutchison	11&9
Joe Mitchell
Fred Clarkson
William Brown	w/o
Cyril Walker	4&2
Louis Tellier
Jack Hobens	w/o
Mike Shearman

Second round October 11
Tom Kerrigan	2&1
George McLean
Alex Smith
Jim Barnes	8&7
Willie Macfarlane	3&2
Mike Brady
Jack Dowling	37h
Emmet French
J. J. O'Brien	3&2
George Simpson
Bob MacDonald
Walter Hagen	3&2
Jock Hutchison	11&9
William Brown
Cyril Walker	5&4
Jack Hobens

Quarter-finals; October 12
Tom Kerrigan
Jim Barnes	3&1
Willie Macfarlane	2&1
Jack Dowling
J. J. O'Brien
Walter Hagen	10&9
Jock Hutchison	4&3
Cyril Walker

Semi-finals; October 13
Jim Barnes	6&5
Willie Macfarlane
Walter Hagen
Jock Hutchison	2up

Final; October 14
Jim Barnes	1up
Jock Hutchison

w/o = won by walkover

== Prize money ==
The winner received $500 and a diamond medal, the runner-up $250 and a gold medal, the losing semi-finalists $125 and a silver medal, while the losing quarter-finalists received $75, second round losers $60 and first round losers $50, making a total prize fund of $2,580.
