= 1914 U.S. Open (golf) =

Coordinates: 41.631°N 87.746°W

Tournament information
- Dates: August 20–21, 1914
- Location: Midlothian, Illinois
- Course: Midlothian Country Club
- Organized by: USGA
- Format: Stroke play − 72 holes

Statistics
- Par: 72
- Length: 6,421 yards (5,871 m)
- Field: 66 players
- Winner's share: $300

Champion
- (United States) Walter Hagen
- 290 (+2)

Location in the United States
Location in Illinois

The 1914 U.S. Open was the 20th U.S. Open, held August 20–21 at Midlothian Country Club in Midlothian, Illinois, a suburb southwest of Chicago. 21-year-old Walter Hagen held off amateur Chick Evans by a single stroke to win the first of his two U.S. Open titles. It was the first of Hagen's eleven major championships.

Hagen opened with a U.S. Open record 68, a stroke ahead of defending champion Francis Ouimet. He led Tom McNamara by a shot after 36 holes, then took a two-stroke lead over McNamara into the final round, with Ouimet three back. McNamara and Ouimet, however, fell back with rounds of 83 and 78, respectively. That left the hard-charging Evans as the last player capable of catching Hagen. Evans needed a two on the 18th to tie, but his chip from the edge of the green came up just short. Hagen birdied the 18th for the fourth consecutive round, a feat unmatched by any U.S. Open champion before or since, and prevailed by one over Evans. Evans' 141 over the final 36 holes set a new U.S. Open record, but it was broken just two years later.

Two-time champion John McDermott, age 22, tied for ninth in his sixth and final U.S. Open appearance.

== Round summaries ==
=== First round ===
Thursday, August 20, 1914 (morning)

Place	Player	Score	To par
1	(United States) Walter Hagen	68	−4
2	(United States) Francis Ouimet (a)	69	−3
T3	(Scotland) James Donaldson	72	E
T3	(United States) Tom McNamara	72	E
T3	(France) Louis Tellier	72	E
T6	(England) Jim Barnes	73	+1
T6	(Scotland) George Simpson; United States	73	+1
T8	(United States) J. J. O'Brien	74	+2
T8	(England) George Sargent	74	+2
T10	(United States) Jack Burke Sr.	75	+3

=== Second round ===
Thursday, August 20, 1914 (afternoon)

Place	Player	Score	To par
1	(United States) Walter Hagen	68-74=142	−2
2	(United States) Tom McNamara	72-71=143	−1
3	(United States) Francis Ouimet (a)	69-76=145	+1
T4	(United States) Joe Mitchell	77-69=146	+2
T4	(United States) J. J. O'Brien	74-72=146	+2
T6	(United States) Alec Ross	72-75=147	+3
T6	(United States) James Simpson	76-71=147	+3
T6	(France) Louis Tellier	72-75=147	+3
T9	(England) Jim Barnes	73-76=149	+5
T9	(Scotland) George Simpson; United States	73-76=149	+5
T9	(United States) Tom Kerrigan	76-73=149	+5

=== Third round ===
Friday, August 21, 1914 (morning)

Place	Player	Score	To par
1	(United States) Walter Hagen	68-74-75=217	+1
2	(United States) Tom McNamara	72-71-76=219	+3
3	(United States) Francis Ouimet (a)	69-76-75=220	+4
T4	(United States) Chick Evans (a)	76-74-71=221	+5
T4	(France) Louis Tellier	72-75-74=221	+5
6	(United States) J. J. O'Brien	74-72-77=223	+7
T7	(United States) Mike Brady	78-72-74=224	+8
T7	(Scotland) George Simpson; United States	76-71-77=224	+8
T9	(Scotland) James Donaldson	72-79-74=225	+9
T9	(United States) John McDermott	77-74-74=225	+9
T9	(England) George Sargent	74-77-74=225	+9

=== Final round ===
Friday, August 21, 1914 (afternoon)

Place	Player	Score	To par	Money ($)
1	(United States) Walter Hagen	68-74-75-73=290	+2	300
2	(United States) Chick Evans (a)	76-74-71-70=291	+3	0
T3	(Scotland) Fred McLeod	78-73-75-71=297	+9	125
T3	(England) George Sargent	74-77-74-72=297	+9	125
T5	(United States) Mike Brady	78-72-74-74=298	+10	75
T5	(Scotland) James Donaldson	72-79-74-73=298	+10	75
T5	(United States) Francis Ouimet (a)	69-76-75-78=298	+10	0
8	(France) Louis Tellier	72-75-74-78=299	+11	60
T9	(United States) John McDermott	77-74-74-75=300	+12	45
T9	Arthur Smith	79-73-76-72=300	+12	45

(a) denotes amateur
