= 1916 U.S. Open (golf) =

Coordinates: 44.943°N 93.322°W

Tournament information
- Dates: June 29–30, 1916
- Location: Minneapolis, Minnesota
- Course: Minikahda Club
- Organized by: USGA
- Format: Stroke play − 72 holes

Statistics
- Par: 72
- Length: 6,150 yards (5,624 m)
- Field: 62 players
- Cut: None
- Winner's share: ($300)

Champion
- (United States) Chick Evans (a)
- 286 (−2)

Location in the United States
Location in Minnesota

The 1916 U.S. Open was the 22nd U.S. Open, held June 29–30 at Minikahda Club in Minneapolis, Minnesota. Amateur Chick Evans led wire-to-wire and set a new U.S. Open scoring record to win his only U.S. Open title, two strokes ahead of runner-up Jock Hutchison.

There were 94 entries and on-site qualifying was held and only the defending champion was exempt. Qualifying was held on Tuesday and Wednesday, and each day half the field played 36 holes for 32 places in the starting field of 64.

Evans opened the championship on Thursday with rounds of 70-69, the first in history to break 140 in the first two rounds of a U.S. Open. He led by three over Wilfrid Reid, who went out of contention after a 79 (+7) in the third round. Evans carded a 74 to maintain his three-shot advantage after 54 holes, with Jim Barnes as the nearest pursuer. After a double-bogey at the fourth hole, Evans recovered with a birdie at the next and matched Barnes through the front nine. At the par-5 12th, Evans found the green in two shots and two-putted for a birdie. He finished with a round of 73 to Barnes' 74. Hutchison, nine back after two rounds, moved up to second place with a 68 (−4), the lowest score to date in the final round of a U.S. Open. As the top professional, he took home the winner's share of the purse.

Evans' total of 286 established a new U.S. Open scoring record that stood for two decades, until 1936. Three months later, he won the U.S. Amateur championship at Merion near Philadelphia and became the first to win both titles in the same year. Evans won the U.S. Amateur again in 1920.

Like previous editions, this U.S. Open was scheduled for just two days, at 36 holes each. Not held in 1917 and 1918 due to World War I, it resumed in 1919 and was stretched to three days, with 18 holes on each of the first two days and 36 holes on the third. It reverted to the two-day format in 1920, then went to the three-day schedule in 1926.

== Course layout ==
Hole	1	2	3	4	5	6	7	8	9	Out	10	11	12	13	14	15	16	17	18	In	Total
Yards	310	460	130	530	265	300	220	410	400	3,025	160	385	535	475	365	335	355	160	355	3,125	6,150
Par	4	5	3	5	4	4	3	4	4	36	3	4	5	5	4	4	4	3	4	36	72

== Round summaries ==
=== First round ===
Thursday, June 29, 1916 (morning)

Place	Player	Score	To par
T1	(United States) Chick Evans (a)	70	−2
T1	(England) Wilfrid Reid	70	−2
T3	(England) Jim Barnes	71	−1
T3	(United States) Jack Dowling	71	−1
T5	(Scotland) Alex Campbell	73	+1
T5	W. Clark	73	+1
T5	(United States) Walter Hagen	73	+1
T5	(Scotland) Jock Hutchison	73	+1
T5	(England) Gilbert Nicholls	73	+1
T5	Bob Peebles	73	+1
T5	(Scotland) Alec Ross	73	+1

=== Second round ===
Thursday, June 29, 1916 (afternoon)

Place	Player	Score	To par
1	(United States) Chick Evans (a)	70-69=139	−5
2	(England) Wilfrid Reid	70-72=142	−2
T3	(England) Jim Barnes	71-74=145	+1
T3	Bob Peebles	73-72=145	+1
T5	(Scotland) Bob MacDonald	74-72=146	+2
T5	(England) George Sargent	75-71=146	+2
7	(United States) Jack Dowling	71-76=147	+3
T8	(United States) Mike Brady	75-73=148	+4
T8	J. Ferguson	75-73=148	+4
T8	(Scotland) Jock Hutchison	73-75=148	+4
T8	(United States) J. J. O'Brien	76-72=148	+4
T8	(Jersey) Tom Vardon	76-72=148	+4

=== Third round ===
Friday, June 30, 1916 (morning)

Place	Player	Score	To par
1	(United States) Chick Evans (a)	70-69-74=213	−3
2	(England) Jim Barnes	71-74-71=216	E
3	(England) George Sargent	75-71-72=218	+2
T4	(Scotland) Jock Hutchison	73-75-72=220	+4
T4	(England) Gilbert Nicholls	73-76-71=220	+4
T6	(United States) J. J. O'Brien	76-72-73=221	+5
T6	Bob Peebles	73-72-76=221	+5
T6	(England) Wilfrid Reid	70-72-79=221	+5
T6	(France) Louis Tellier	74-75-72=221	+5
10	(United States) Jack Dowling	71-76-75=222	+6

=== Final round ===
Friday, June 30, 1916 (afternoon)

Place	Player	Score	To par	Money ($)
1	(United States) Chick Evans (a)	70-69-74-73=286	−2	0
2	(Scotland) Jock Hutchison	73-75-72-68=288	E	300
3	(England) Jim Barnes	71-74-71-74=290	+2	150
T4	(England) Gilbert Nicholls	73-76-71-73=293	+5	83
T4	(England) Wilfrid Reid	70-72-79-72=293	+5	83
T4	(England) George Sargent	75-71-72-75=293	+5	83
7	(United States) Walter Hagen	73-76-75-71=295	+7	60
8	(Scotland) Bob MacDonald	74-72-77-73=296	+8	50
T9	(United States) Mike Brady	75-73-75-74=297	+9	30
T9	(United States) J. J. O'Brien	76-72-73-76=297	+9	30
T9	(Jersey) Tom Vardon	76-72-75-74=297	+9	30

(a) denotes amateur
