= 1915 U.S. Open (golf) =

Coordinates: 40.705°N 74.328°W

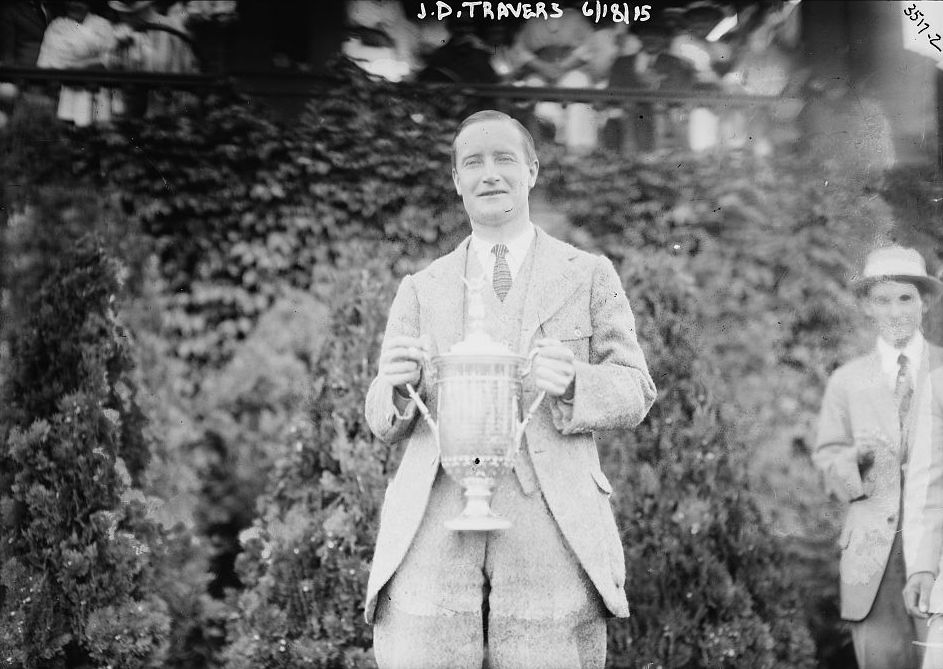
- Travers with the winner's cup

Tournament information
- Dates: June 17−18, 1915
- Location: Springfield, New Jersey
- Course(s): Baltusrol Golf Club; Old Course (no longer exists)
- Organized by: USGA
- Format: Stroke play − 72 holes

Statistics
- Par: 74
- Length: 6,212 yards (5,680 m)
- Field: 66 players
- Winner's share: ($300)

Champion
- (United States) Jerome Travers (a)
- 297 (+1)

Location in the United States
Location in New Jersey

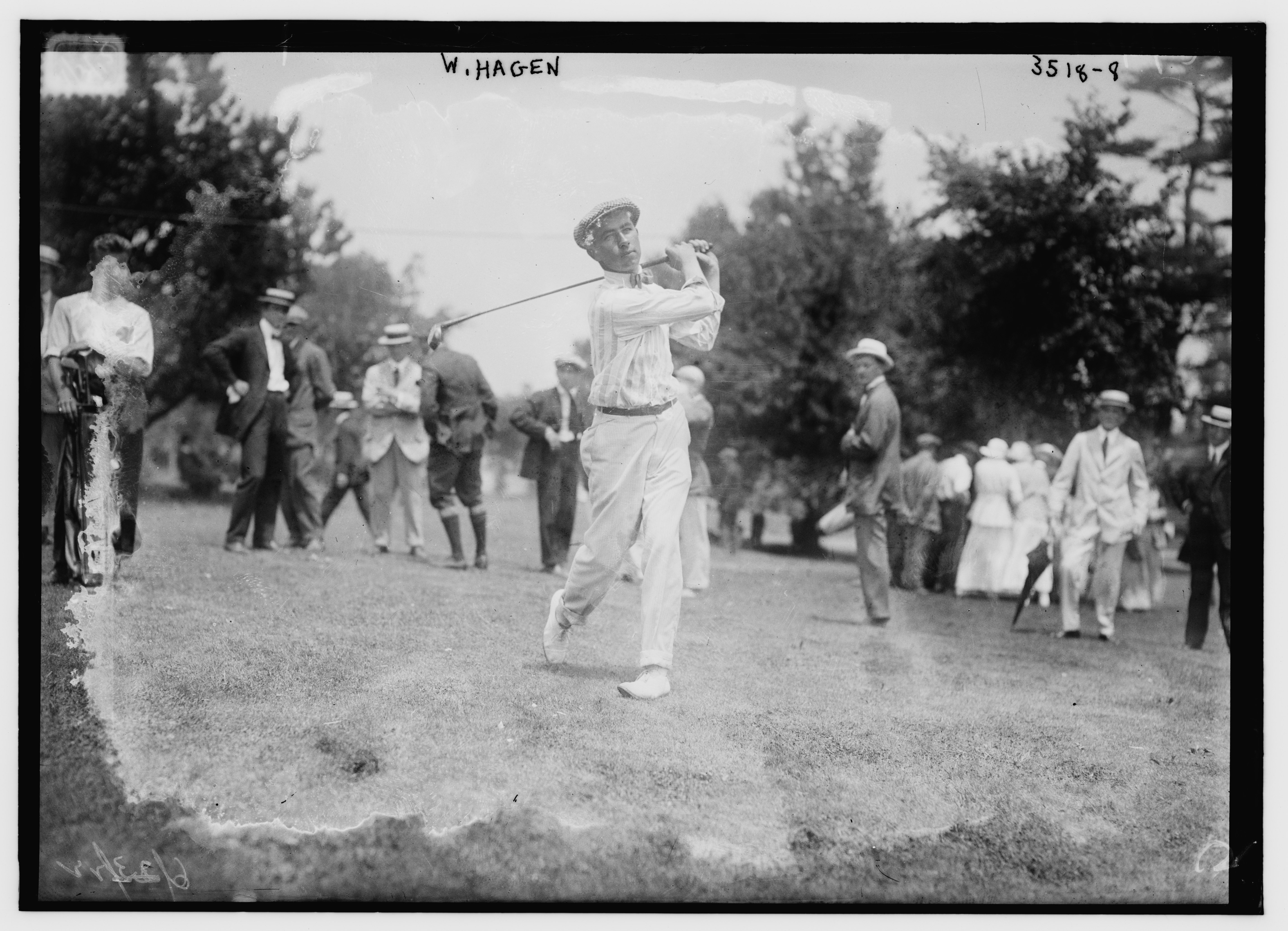
Walter Hagen

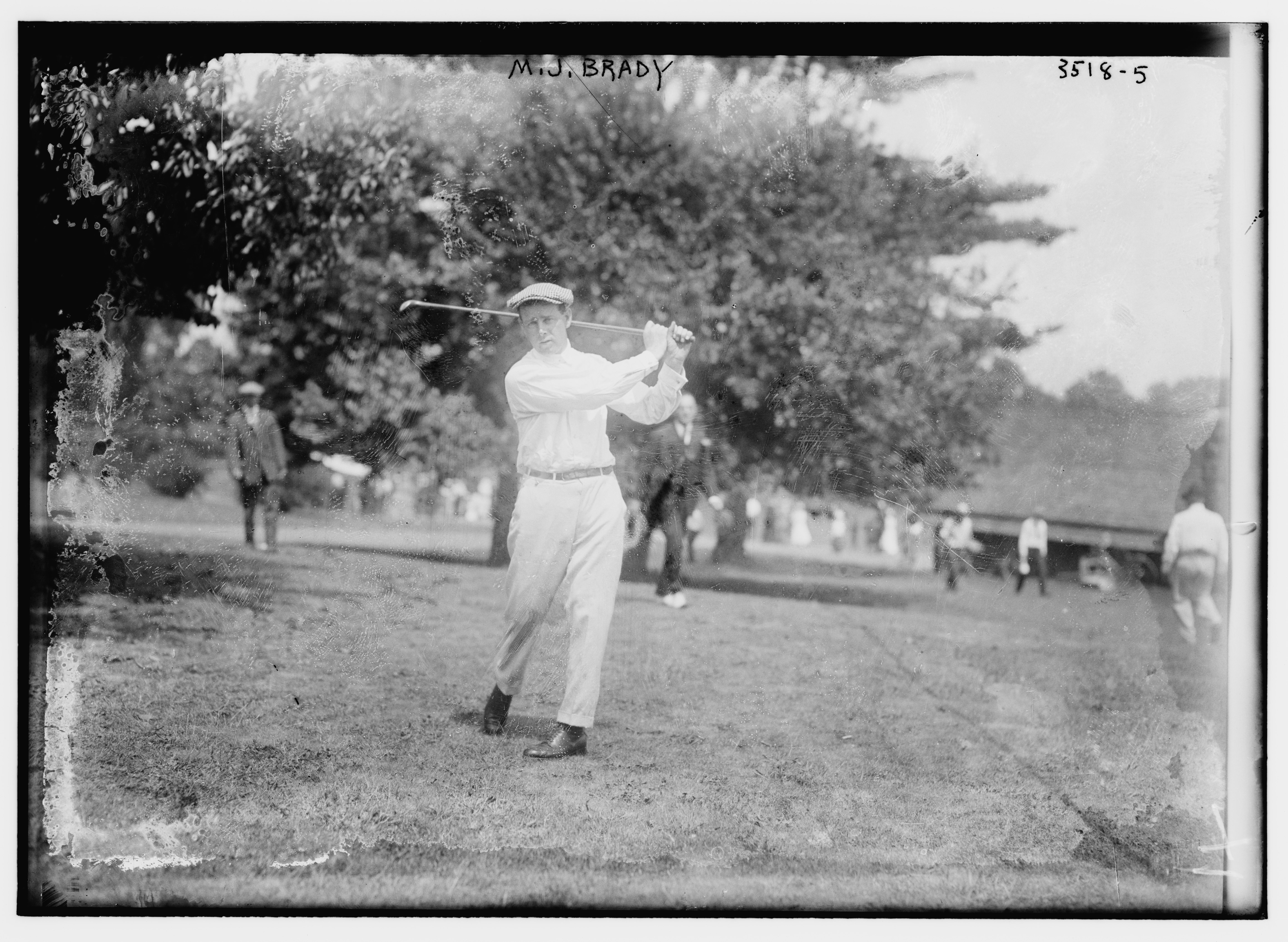
Mike Brady

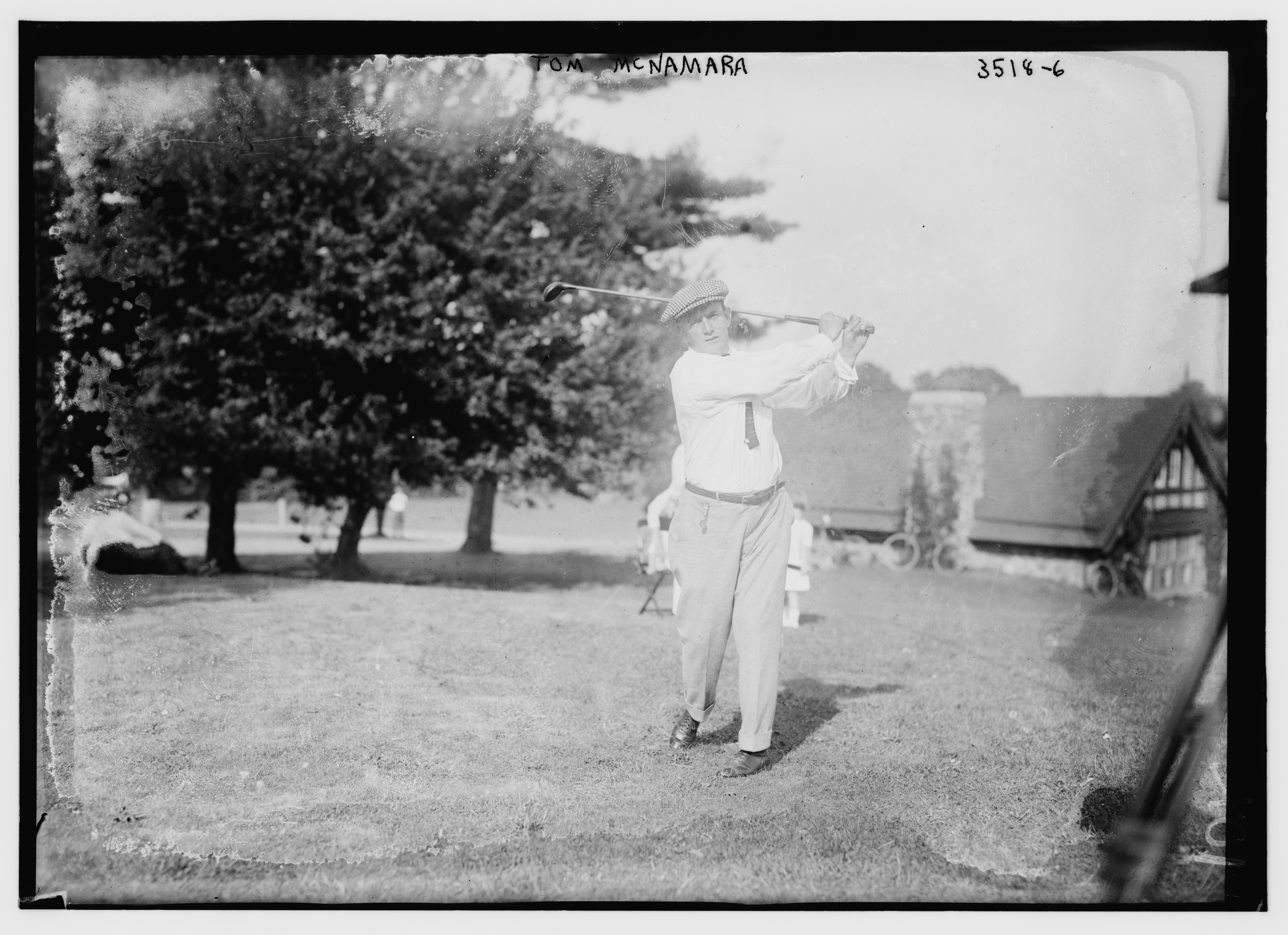
Tom McNamara

The 1915 U.S. Open was the 21st U.S. Open, held June 17–18 at Baltusrol Golf Club in Springfield, New Jersey, west of New York City. Four-time U.S. Amateur champion Jerome Travers captured his only U.S. Open title, one stroke ahead of runner-up Tom McNamara. The championship was played on the original course at Baltusrol, now known as the Old Course, which no longer exists.

Future U.S. Open champions Jim Barnes and Chick Evans shared the first round lead, with Travers five behind. After a 72 in the second round, Travers pulled to within two-shots of leaders Barnes and Louis Tellier.

Travers took the lead in the third round with a 73, a shot ahead of Barnes, Tellier, Bob MacDonald, and Mike Brady, with McNamara two behind. MacDonald shot a 78 in the final round to finish in third, while Barnes and Tellier both shot 79 to finish in fourth. McNamara posted a 75 to total 298 as Travers made the turn at 39, and needed a 37 on the back-nine to win the title. His drive at the 10th went out of bounds, while his second shot found the rough. His third shot cleared the water surrounding the green and settled less than three feet (0.9 m) from the hole. He managed to save par with a 15-footer (4.5 m) at the 11th, three-putted for bogey at the 12th, but then made a birdie at 15. Pars over the final three holes saw him finish with a 76 and a 297 total.

Shortly after this win, Travers announced his retirement from competitive golf and never played in the U.S. Open again.

Defending champion Walter Hagen finished nine strokes back, in a tie for tenth place.

The Old Course at Baltusrol was plowed under three years later in 1918 by course architect A. W. Tillinghast to create the Upper and Lower Courses.

== Round summaries ==
=== First round ===
Thursday, June 17, 1915 (morning)

Place	Player	Score	To par
T1	(England) Jim Barnes	71	−3
T1	(United States) Chick Evans (a)	71	−3
3	(Scotland) Bob MacDonald	72	−2
T4	(Scotland) Jock Hutchison	74	E
T4	(Scotland) Fred McLeod	74	E
T6	Davis Ogilvie	75	+1
T6	(England) George Sargent	75	+1
T6	(France) Louis Tellier	75	+1
T9	(United States) Mike Brady	76	+2
T9	(Scotland) Alex Campbell	76	+2
T9	Joe Mitchell	76	+2
T9	(United States) Jerome Travers (a)	76	+2

=== Second round ===
Thursday, June 17, 1915 (afternoon)

Place	Player	Score	To par
T1	(England) Jim Barnes	71-75=146	−2
T1	(France) Louis Tellier	75-71=146	−2
3	(United States) Mike Brady	76-71=147	−1
4	(United States) Jerome Travers (a)	76-72=148	E
T5	(Scotland) Bob MacDonald	72-77=149	+1
T5	(United States) Tom McNamara	78-71=149	+1
7	(Scotland) Fred McLeod	74-76=150	+2
T8	(United States) Walter Hagen	78-73=151	+3
T8	(Scotland) Alex Campbell	76-75=151	+3
T10	(United States) Chick Evans (a)	71-81=152	+4
T10	(Scotland) George Low	78-74=152	+4
T10	(England) George Sargent	75-77=152	+4

=== Third round ===
Friday, June 18, 1915 (morning)

Place	Player	Score	To par
1	(United States) Jerome Travers (a)	76-72-73=221	−1
T2	(United States) Mike Brady	76-71-75=222	E
T2	(Scotland) Bob MacDonald	72-77-73=222	E
T2	(France) Louis Tellier	75-71-76=222	E
5	(United States) Tom McNamara	78-71-74=223	+1
T6	(England) Jim Barnes	71-75-79=225	+3
T6	(Scotland) Alex Campbell	76-75-74=225	+3
8	(Scotland) Fred McLeod	74-76-76=226	+4
9	(United States) Walter Hagen	78-73-76=227	+5
10	(Scotland) George Low	78-74-76=228	+6

=== Final round ===
Friday, June 18, 1915 (afternoon)

Place	Player	Score	To par	Money ($)
1	(United States) Jerome Travers (a)	76-72-73-76=297	+1	0
2	(United States) Tom McNamara	78-71-74-75=298	+2	300
3	(Scotland) Bob MacDonald	72-77-73-78=300	+4	150
T4	(England) Jim Barnes	71-75-79-76=301	+5	90
T4	(France) Louis Tellier	75-71-76-79=301	+5	90
6	(United States) Mike Brady	76-71-75-80=302	+6	70
7	(Scotland) George Low	78-74-76-75=303	+7	60
T8	(Scotland) Jock Hutchison	74-79-76-76=305	+9	45
T8	(Scotland) Fred McLeod	74-76-76-79=305	+9	45
T10	(Scotland) Alex Campbell	76-75-74-81=306	+10	6
T10	(United States) Emmet French	77-79-75-75=306	+10	6
T10	(United States) Walter Hagen	78-73-76-79=306	+10	6
T10	(United States) Tom Kerrigan	78-75-76-77=306	+10	6
T10	(England) Gilbert Nicholls	78-81-73-74=306	+10	6
T10	(Scotland) Jack Park	77-77-75-77=306	+10	6
T10	(England) Wilfrid Reid	77-78-75-76=306	+10	6
T10	(England) George Sargent	75-77-79-75=306	+10	6

Amateurs: Travers (+1), Evans (+11), Stone (+12), Ouimet (+21).
