= Walter Fovargue =

American professional golfer (1882–1963)

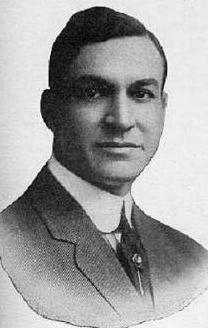
- Fovargue, c. 1910

Personal information
- Full name: Walter George Fovargue
- Nationality: United States
- Born: October 13, 1882 Glenville, Ohio
- Died: March 27, 1963 (aged 80) San Diego County, California
- Height: 6 ft 1 in (185 cm)

Career
- Sport: Golf
- Turned professional: 1899 reinstated amateur in 1919
- Professional wins: 1

Best results in major championships
- Masters Tournament: DNP
- PGA Championship: T17: 1916
- U.S. Open: T13: 1906, 1916
- The Open Championship: DNP

Walter George Fovargue (October 13, 1882 – March 27, 1963) was an American professional golfer, club maker, and golf course architect. In 1916, he was one of the founding members of the PGA of America. He won the 1917 Northwest Open and finished fourth in the 1912 Western Open. He finished T13 in the 1906 and 1916 U.S. Opens and played in the inaugural PGA Championship in 1916 but lost in the first round.

After 20 years playing as a professional, he applied for and was granted reinstatement to amateur status in 1919.

== Early life ==
Born in Glenville, Ohio, on October 13, 1882, he was the son of Frank P. Fovargue and Augusta E. Fovargue (née Orth). Fovargue started out as a caddie at the Cleveland Country Club and by age 17 was working as a professional there. Due to poor health as a youngster, he was encouraged to get outside in the fresh air to improve his health. He played as both a professional and an amateur during his career. He was described as a person who possessed a "genial manner and sportsmanlike instinct that endeared him to scores of golfers".

== Golf career ==
He replaced Robert Foulis, brother of James Foulis, as the head professional at the Town and Country Club in Saint Paul, Minnesota, in 1900, staying there for a year before moving on to Philadelphia Country Club from 1902 to 1903 and later took a post at the Skokie Country Club outside Chicago.

Fovargue lost a high dollar winner-take-all 36-hole challenge match for $200 against John Reid in 1903 that was played on neutral ground at the Philadelphia Cricket Club. The first prize at the U.S. Open that year was only $150.

In 1908–09 he was posted during the winter months as professional at El Paso Country Club in El Paso, Texas. He was a member of the PGA of America's first executive committee in 1916 while serving as professional at Skokie Country Club, representing the Middle States Section.

He moved to San Francisco in 1916 and established a retail golf sales business. In San Francisco he worked as an understudy with Donald Ross absorbing the latest ideas in golf course construction. In 1917, he moved to Aberdeen, Washington.

In 1918, during World War I, he discontinued his golf career to work in the ship building business at Aberdeen. In 1919 he had his amateur status reinstated after undergoing a one-year waiting period imposed by the USGA. Fovargue considered the ship building job to be "his bit" in the war effort. Fovargue was a competitor in the 1930 British Amateur, played on the Old Course at St. Andrews, Scotland. He lost his last-128 match against William Breck Torrance by the score of 5 and 4. Bobby Jones won the tournament, defeating Roger Wethered 7 and 6 in the final.

=== Golf course architecture ===
Fovargue was a golf course architect, designing courses in the United States and abroad. In 1921 he designed a course in Japan. He worked in partnership with Wilfrid Reid on courses they built in California.

==== Selected courses designed ====
Sources:

- Grays Harbor Country Club

Original design: John Ball (alterations by Fovargue c. 1922)

- Wawona Golf Club
- Willapa Harbor Golf Course
- Lakeside Golf and Country Club
- Olympia Country Club
- Oaksridge Golf Course
- Fairhope Country Club

== Death ==
Fovargue died on March 27, 1963, in San Diego County, California.
