= Connecticut Open =

Connecticut Open may refer to:

- Connecticut Open (1910s event), a PGA Tour-level tournament
- Connecticut Open (golf), the state's official open
- Connecticut Open (tennis), a WTA Tour tennis tournament
