= Bob MacDonald (golfer) =

Scottish professional golfer (1885–1960)

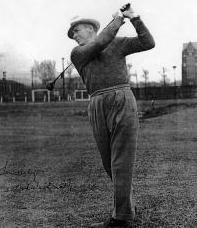
- MacDonald, c. 1922

Personal information
- Full name: Robert George MacDonald
- Nationality: Scotland
- Born: 24 February 1885 Evelix, Dornoch, Scotland
- Died: 29 March 1960 (aged 75) West Hollywood, Florida
- Height: 5 ft 11 in (1.80 m)

Career
- Sport: Golf
- Status: Professional
- Former tour: PGA Tour
- Professional wins: 3

Number of wins by tour
- PGA Tour: 3

Best results in major championships
- Masters Tournament: T54: 1935
- PGA Championship: T3: 1919
- U.S. Open: 3rd: 1915
- The Open Championship: DNP

Robert George MacDonald (24 February 1885 – 29 March 1960) was a Scottish-born professional golfer who played primarily in the United States. He was also a club maker who played in the early 20th century. He had three top-10 finishes in the U.S. Open. His best performance came in 1915 when he was third. He finished eighth in 1916 and tenth in 1920. MacDonald was a frequent competitor in the PGA Championship, his best result coming in 1919 when he finished T3.

He won the 1922 Texas Open, pocketing $1,633 in prize money, and also won the Metropolitan Open twice, in 1921 and again in 1923. His career results could have been much better had it not been for the interruption caused by the First World War.

== Early life ==
MacDonald was born on 24 February 1885 in Evelix, Scotland. As a young man he worked as a gardener and in 1900 served in the Second Boer War. He and his family emigrated to the United States in 1910 and his first posting as a professional was in New Jersey and he later took a job at Hyde Park Country Club in Cincinnati, Ohio. MacDonald also had two brothers, Bill and Jack, who both went on to become professional golfers.

The Aberdeen Journal described MacDonald as "a big brawny Scotsman of the Braid type, and has all the markings of a first-class player". MacDonald took up a post at North Berwick with his brother-in-law, Donald MacKay, and James Watt.

== Professional career ==
The 1915 U.S. Open was the 21st U.S. Open, held 17–18 June at Baltusrol Golf Club in Springfield, New Jersey, west of New York City. Four-time U.S. Amateur champion Jerome Travers captured his only U.S. Open title, one stroke ahead of runner-up Tom McNamara. The championship was played on the original course at Baltusrol, now known as the Old Course, which no longer exists. MacDonald played very well in the event. He scored with rounds of 72-77-73-78=300 and finished in third place, winning $150 in prize money.

The 1919 PGA Championship was the second PGA Championship, contested from 16–20 September at the Engineers Country Club in Roslyn Harbor, New York. In his opening 36-hole match MacDonald slipped past Tom Boyd by the slim margin of 1 up. His play in the next match, against George Fotheringham, was more convincing when he was victorious 2 and 1. He rode that momentum into his third match against a much better opponent, Jock Hutchison, but still managed to win 3 and 2. He found himself in the semi-finals against Jim Barnes and finally succumbed by the score of 5 and 4, finishing the tournament tied for third place.

=== Instructor ===
MacDonald was posted as professional at a number of clubs in the Chicago area, including Evanston, Edgewater, and Indian Hill Club. He coached legendary golfers Gene Sarazen, Horton Smith and Babe Zaharias. His book, Golf, published in 1927, was a classic in the late 1920s. In the book's preface he wrote, "It is probably beyond argument that the golf stroke, apart from the putt, is the most highly technical method of hitting a ball in the whole realm of sport".

He opened in 1918, with Jock Hutchison as partner, the first indoor golf facility in Chicago. The facility was later enlarged to cover 20,000 square feet by 1926.

== Personal life ==
MacDonald would marry three times, the first to a French girl probably around 1908 when he was professional at Aix-les-Bains and playing in tournaments at Hyères and Costebelle on the French Riviera.

MacDonald died in West Hollywood, Florida, on 29 March 1960 after an illness lasting several months.

== Professional wins (3) ==
=== PGA Tour wins (3) ===
- 1921 Metropolitan Open
- 1922 Texas Open
- 1923 Metropolitan Open

== Results in major championships ==
Tournament	1913	1914	1915	1916	1917	1918	1919	1920	1921	1922	1923	1924
U.S. Open	T27	?	3	8	NT	NT	T29	10		T13	T32	
PGA Championship	NYF	NYF	NYF	R16	NT	NT	SF	QF				

Tournament	1925	1926	1927	1928	1929	1930	1931	1932	1933	1934	1935
Masters Tournament	NYF	NYF	NYF	NYF	NYF	NYF	NYF	NYF	NYF		T54
U.S. Open	T15	T27	T29		CUT			T27	T60		WD
PGA Championship				R16							

Note: MacDonald never played in The Open Championship.

Top 10
Did not play

NYF = tournament not yet founded
NT = no tournament
? = unknown
CUT = missed the half-way cut
WD = withdrew
R16, QF, SF = round in which player lost in PGA Championship match play
"T" indicates a tie for a place
