= 1920 U.S. Open (golf) =

Coordinates: 41.652°N 83.651°W

Tournament information
- Dates: August 12–13, 1920
- Location: Toledo, Ohio
- Course: Inverness Club
- Organized by: USGA
- Format: Stroke play − 72 holes

Statistics
- Par: 71
- Length: 6,569 yards (6,007 m)
- Field: 70
- Cut: none
- Winner's share: $500

Champion
- (Jersey) Ted Ray
- 295 (+11)

Location in the United States
Location in Ohio

The 1920 U.S. Open was the 24th U.S. Open, held August 12–13 at the Inverness Club in Toledo, Ohio.

Isle of Jersey natives Harry Vardon and Ted Ray played in their first U.S. Open since their playoff loss to Francis Ouimet in 1913. The 50-year-old Vardon, the champion twenty years earlier in 1900, held a five-stroke lead with just five holes to play. He then proceeded to three-putt three holes in a row, then double-bogeyed the 17th after finding the water. He shot 42 (+6) on the second nine, giving him a 78 (+7) for the round and 296 total (+12), and finished in a tie for second, one stroke back. Ray also struggled in the final round, with four bogeys on the back nine. But he parred the 18th, giving him 295 total and a one-stroke victory over runners-up Vardon, Jock Hutchison, Leo Diegel, and Jack Burke Sr.

This Open marked the first appearance by Bobby Jones, Gene Sarazen, Tommy Armour, and Johnny Farrell. Between them, they won eight of the next twelve U.S. Opens. This Open returned to the two-day format, with the first two rounds played on the same day; the three-day schedule was permanently adopted for 1926 and the present four-day schedule was first used in 1965.

The 1920 Open was also notable for its treatment of professional players. Prior to this tournament, only amateur players could use the clubhouse facilities of the host course at important events. Professional golfers were viewed as club employees rather than members and thus were forced to enter the clubhouse (if needed) using the back door and could not change clothes or shower there. Officials in Toledo were aware of how attitudes towards professionals were changing in other sports and convinced the USGA and the Inverness Club membership to allow all players to use the clubhouse during the tournament. Eleven years later, when the U.S. Open returned to Inverness, opening the clubhouse had become standard practice; as a token of gratitude for their forward thinking, qualifying pros took up a collection and donated a grandfather clock which remains in the clubhouse.

At the age of 43 years and 138 days, Ray became the oldest U.S. Open champion, a record he held for 66 years, until Raymond Floyd, a few months older, won in 1986. Julius Boros was also 43 when he won in 1963. Hale Irwin set the current record in 1990 at age 45.

This was the first of six major championships at Inverness, which later hosted the U.S. Open in 1931, 1957, and 1979. The PGA Championship was played at the course in 1986 and 1993.

== Course layout ==
Hole	1	2	3	4	5	6	7	8	9	Out	10	11	12	13	14	15	16	17	18	In	Total
Yards	385	392	135	430	438	360	320	208	492	3,160	346	359	522	150	417	446	410	430	332	3,409	6,569
Par	4	4	3	4	4	4	4	3	5	35	4	4	5	3	4	4	4	4	4	36	71

== Round summaries ==
=== First round ===
Thursday, August 12, 1920 (morning)

Place	Player	Score	To par
1	(United States) Jock Hutchison	69	−2
2	(United States) Leo Diegel	72	+1
T3	(Scotland) Bob MacDonald	73	+2
T3	(England) J. Douglas Edgar	73	+2
T5	G.L. Bowden	74	+3
T5	(United States) Chick Evans (a)	74	+3
T5	(United States) Walter Hagen	74	+3
T5	(Jersey) Ted Ray	74	+3
T5	(Jersey) Harry Vardon	74	+3
T10	(Scotland) Laurie Ayton, Snr	75	+4
T10	(United States) Jack Burke Sr.	75	+4
T10	(United States) Eddie Loos	75	+4
T10	(Scotland) Fred McLeod	75	+4

=== Second round ===
Thursday, August 12, 1920 (afternoon)

Place	Player	Score	To par
1	(United States) Jock Hutchison	69-76=145	+3
T2	(England) Jim Barnes	76-70=146	+4
T2	(United States) Leo Diegel	72-74=146	+4
T4	(United States) Walter Hagen	74-73=147	+5
T4	(Jersey) Ted Ray	74-73=147	+5
T4	(Jersey) Harry Vardon	74-73=147	+5
7	(United States) Eddie Loos	75-74=149	+7
8	(United States) Chick Evans (a)	74-76=150	+8
T9	(Scotland) Bob MacDonald	73-78=151	+9
T9	(Scotland) Willie Macfarlane	76-75=151	+9

=== Third round ===
Friday, August 13, 1920 (morning)

Place	Player	Score	To par
1	(Jersey) Harry Vardon	74-73-71=218	+5
T2	(United States) Leo Diegel	72-74-73=219	+6
T2	(United States) Jock Hutchison	69-76-74=219	+6
4	(Jersey) Ted Ray	74-73-73=220	+7
T5	(England) Jim Barnes	76-70-76=222	+9
T5	(United States) Bobby Jones (a)	78-74-70=222	+9
T5	(Scotland) Bob MacDonald	73-78-71=222	+9
8	(United States) Chick Evans (a)	74-76-73=223	+10
9	(United States) Jack Burke Sr.	75-77-72=224	+11
10	(Scotland) Willie Macfarlane	76-75-74=225	+12

=== Final round ===
Friday, August 13, 1920 (afternoon)

Place	Player	Score	To par	Money ($)
1	(Jersey) Ted Ray	74-73-73-75=295	+11	500
T2	(United States) Jack Burke Sr.	75-77-72-72=296	+12	188
T2	(United States) Leo Diegel	72-74-73-77=296	+12	188
T2	(United States) Jock Hutchison	69-76-74-77=296	+12	188
T2	(Jersey) Harry Vardon	74-73-71-78=296	+12	188
T6	(England) Jim Barnes	76-70-76-76=298	+14	90
T6	(United States) Chick Evans (a)	74-76-73-75=298	+14	0
T8	(United States) Bobby Jones (a)	78-74-70-77=299	+15	0
T8	(Scotland) Willie Macfarlane	76-75-74-74=299	+15	80
10	(Scotland) Bob MacDonald	73-78-71-78=300	+16	75

(a) denotes amateur

=== Scorecard ===
Final round

Hole	1	2	3	4	5	6	7	8	9	10	11	12	13	14	15	16	17	18
Par	4	4	3	4	4	4	4	3	5	4	4	5	3	4	4	4	4	4
(Jersey) Ray	+7	+7	+7	+6	+6	+7	+6	+7	+7	+7	+8	+9	+9	+9	+10	+10	+11	+11
(United States) Burke	+11	+11	+10	+11	+11	+12	+14	+13	+13	+12	+12	+11	+11	+12	+12	+12	+12	+12
(United States) Diegel	+6	+6	+6	+7	+8	+8	+8	+8	+8	+8	+8	+8	+8	+10	+11	+12	+12	+12
(United States) Hutchison	+8	+8	+8	+8	+9	+10	+10	+10	+10	+10	+10	+11	+11	+11	+12	+12	+12	+12
(Jersey) Vardon	+5	+5	+5	+5	+5	+5	+5	+6	+6	+6	+5	+6	+7	+8	+9	+10	+12	+12

Cumulative tournament scores, relative to par
