= J. J. O'Brien (golfer) =

American professional golfer (1888–1928)

Personal information
- Full name: John James O'Brien
- Nickname: Spitz
- Nationality: United States
- Born: February 16, 1888 Philadelphia, Pennsylvania, U.S.
- Died: April 6, 1928 (aged 40) Wilkinsburg, Pennsylvania, U.S.

Career
- Sport: Golf
- Status: Professional

Best results in major championships
- Masters Tournament: DNP
- PGA Championship: T5: 1916
- U.S. Open: T9: 1916
- The Open Championship: DNP

John James O'Brien (February 16, 1888 – April 6, 1928) was an American professional golfer. His best year was 1916 when he was in the top 10 in the U.S. Open and he reached the quarter-finals of the inaugural PGA Championship.

== Professional career ==
In the 1914 U.S. Open, O'Brien was tied for fourth place after the first day, just 4 strokes behind Walter Hagen. Two disappointing rounds on the final day left him tied for 13th place, 12 strokes behind Hagen.

In June 1916, O'Brien finished tied for 9th place in the U.S. Open, despite a final round of 76. In August, he finished tied for 6th place behind Walter Hagen in the Western Open and then in September he qualified for the final stage of the inaugural PGA Championship, finishing 4th in the qualifying of the Middle West section at the Glen View Club, with 7 places available. The championship was played at Siwanoy Country Club in mid-October. O'Brien won his first two matches before losing 10 & 9 to Hagen in the quarter-finals.

== Personal life ==
O'Brien died in April 1928. He had been suffering from the effects of pneumonia for three years. For a number of years he had been running an indoor golf facility in East Liberty (Pittsburgh).

== Results in major championships ==
Tournament	1912	1913	1914	1915	1916	1917	1918	1919	1920
U.S. Open	CUT	WD	T13	T32	T9	NT	NT		T23
PGA Championship	NYF	NYF	NYF	NYF	QF	NT	NT		

Note: O'Brien never played in The Open Championship.

Top 10
Did not play

NYF = tournament not yet founded
NT = no tournament
WD = withdrew
CUT = missed the half-way cut
R64, R32, R16, QF, SF = round in which player lost in PGA Championship match play
"T" indicates a tie for a place
