= Connecticut Open (1910s event) =

Golf tournament

The Connecticut Open was a golf event in 1915 and 1916. The event was held in New London, Connecticut. It was won by the English golfer Jim Barnes both years. Though the event boasted "a large measure of success" with "fine fields" it was never official hosted by the Connecticut Golf Association.

== History ==
In 1915, the event was held at Shennecossett Golf Course at Eastern Point. It was reported by the New-York Tribune that this was the first-ever Connecticut Open. The day before the event proper, on Thursday July 22, there was a "preliminary competition." The event proper was 36 holes. The event was one day long, played on Friday July 23. The field of 72 included many of "the leading professionals" of the day like Jim Barnes, Mike Brady, Jock Hutchison, Fred McLeod, Tom McNamara, George Sargent, Louis Tellier, and Alex Smith. Barnes won the event by five shots over Brady and Hutchinson. Barnes had a total of 148.

In 1916, the event was also held at Shennecossett. Again the event was one day long and two rounds. There was a gallery of 1,000 people. According to The New York Times, the favorites to win the tournament were Mike Brady, Walter Hagen, and Jim Barnes. In the morning round, Macdonald Smith broke the course record with a 69 to take the lead. Brady, Alex Smith, and Barnes were, respectively, the next three players. By the 7th hole of the afternoon round, however, Brady had taken the lead. According to The Boston Post, however, the 15th hole "was his Waterloo." Brady hit his tee shot in the bunker while Smith hit his on the green. Smith made his putt for a two. Brady took two shots to get out of the bunker and made a five. He was now one behind leader Smith. The 16th hole turned out to be the "decisive hole" of the tournament. Smith missed a two-foot putt and recorded a four. Meanwhile, Barnes "made a nice 3" and "once again changed the positions of all." Barnes now had a one-stroke lead over Brady and the Smith brothers. Barnes, Brady, and Alex Smtih all made four at the final two holes. Barnes defeated Brady and Smith by one. Brady and Smith split the second and third place money. MacDonald Smith, meanwhile, finished with a 5 and then a 4 on the final two holes for a 79 to finish in solo fourth place at 148, two back. Barnes received a gold medal. In addition, he won $200. The low amateur was J.T.L. Hubbard. He finished at 158, finishing in a tie for 20th place overall with the notable professional Walter Hagen.

In the 1920s, there was talk of renewing the event. In 1930, an event entitled the Connecticut Open was scheduled to be hosted on September 13 and 14. The event was scheduled to be held at Shenecossett Club again. However, it failed to receive "sanction" from the Connecticut Golf Association. The event was canceled by September 3. It was also reported during late 1930 that the Connecticut Golf Association was planning on sanctioning an official state open in the summer of 1931. The first Connecticut Open sanctioned by the Connecticut Golf Association was indeed held in 1931.

== Winners ==
Year	Winner	Score	Margin of victory	Runners-up	Ref.
1915	(England) Jim Barnes	148	5 strokes	(United States) Mike Brady, (Scotland) Jock Hutchison	
1916	(England) Jim Barnes	146	1 stroke	(United States) Mike Brady, (Scotland) Alex Smith	

== See also ==
- Connecticut Open
- New Haven Open
