= Tom Kerrigan (golfer) =

American professional golfer (1895–1964)

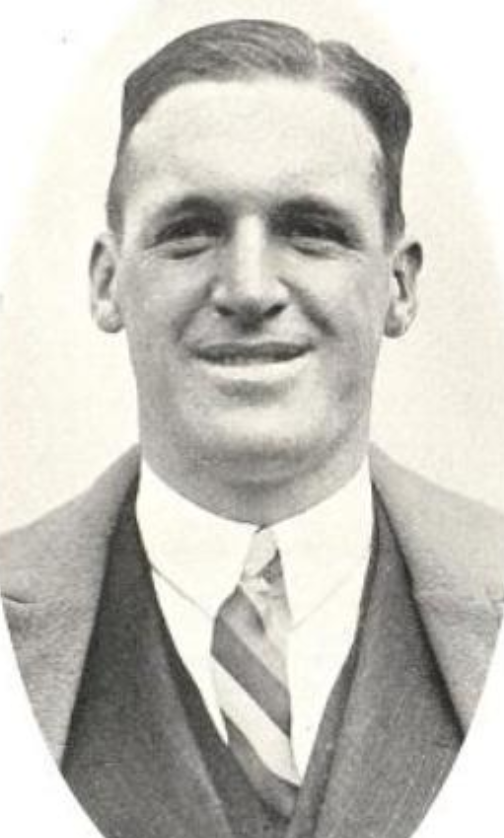
- Kerrigan in 1921

Personal information
- Full name: Thomas Francis Kerrigan
- Nickname: Tee Shot
- Nationality: United States
- Born: October 10, 1895 Quincy, Massachusetts
- Died: May 6, 1964 (aged 68) Bronxville, New York
- Height: 5 ft 8 1/2 in (174 cm)

Career
- Sport: Golf
- Status: Professional
- Professional wins: 4

Number of wins by tour
- PGA Tour: 3
- Other: 1

Best results in major championships
- Masters Tournament: T36: 1937
- PGA Championship: T5: 1925
- U.S. Open: T10: 1915
- The Open Championship: 3rd: 1921

Thomas Francis Kerrigan (October 10, 1895 – May 6, 1964) was an American professional golfer who played in the early 20th century. Kerrigan's best performance in the Open Championship came in the 1921 Open Championship when after enduring an Atlantic voyage aboard the RMS Aquitania he quickly acclimated himself to the Open Championship course at St Andrews on arrival in Britain and finished in third place. He was a frequent competitor in the PGA Championship in which his best results were quarter-final losses (in match play) in 1916, 1922, and 1925.

== Early life ==
Kerrigan was born in Quincy, Massachusetts, on October 10, 1895. His parents were Thomas F. Kerrigan (1873–1926) and Mary E. Kerrigan née Carroll (1869–1914). His brothers William and George also became golf professionals as well.

Like nearly all professionals from his era, he first learned the game of golf as a caddie in his youth. He joined the Siwanoy Country Club in 1914 and served as professional for a year at the Dedham Country and Polo Club in Massachusetts; however, he later returned to Siwanoy and would spend the majority of his career there.

Kerrigan served in the U.S. Navy during World War I. He played in charity matches, sometimes wearing his Navy uniform, to raise money for the American Red Cross.

== Professional career ==
Kerrigan, who by 1920 was playing out of Siwanoy Country Club, carded two rounds totaling 143 and won by six shots in the inaugural 1920 Westchester Open golf tournament held on the Gedney Farm Country Club course (now known as Westchester Hills Golf Club). His driving was described as "long and straight". His iron shots were effectively executed and he was able to handle the treacherous greens when the other players could not. His putting was said to be "wellnigh faultless." Arthur Reid, playing out of Ardsley Country Club, was second on 149 and Jack Dowling came in third on 150.

Kerrigan was twice the runner-up in the Canadian Open championship. In the 1922 Canadian Open, held at Mt. Bruno Golf Club in Saint-Bruno-de-Montarville, Québec, Kerrigan shot 304 and Al Watrous was on 303, beating Kerrigan by a single shot. Kerrigan returned to play in the 1923 Canadian Open, held on the Herbert Strong-designed Lakeview Golf Club in Toronto, Ontario, and once again finished in the second spot, this time losing to Clarence Hackney by the score of 295 to 300.

The 1921 Open Championship was the 56th Open Championship, held 23–25 June at the Old Course at St Andrews in St Andrews, Scotland. Former local Jock Hutchison won his only Open Championship, in a 36-hole playoff over amateur Roger Wethered. It was Hutchison's second and final major title. Kerrigan finished in third place, carding rounds of 74-80-72-72=298, and won £40.

Kerrigan taught many golfers who went on to success in their own right in golf. Among them was Jess Sweetser, the first American-born amateur golfer to win the British Amateur championship which in 1926 was contested at Muirfield. Sweetser also won the 1922 U.S. Amateur championship.

In 1939 he shot the exceptionally low score of 62 on the par-71 Siwanoy course. He was often called "Tee Shot" Kerrigan due to his ability to hit unusually long drives.

== Death ==
After a three-month-long illness, Kerrigan died on May 6, 1964, at Lawrence Hospital (now New York-Presbyterian Lawrence Hospital) in Bronxville, New York.

== Professional wins (3) ==
=== PGA Tour wins (3) ===
- 1920 Westchester Open
- 1922 Massachusetts Open, Asheville Open

== Results in major championships ==
Tournament	1914	1915	1916	1917	1918	1919
U.S. Open	T20	T10	T29	NT	NT	T26
The Open Championship		NT	NT	NT	NT	NT
PGA Championship	NYF	NYF	QF	NT	NT	R16

Tournament	1920	1921	1922	1923	1924	1925	1926	1927	1928	1929
U.S. Open	T23	T35	T31	T46	T19	T18	CUT	CUT	CUT	CUT
The Open Championship		3								
PGA Championship		R32	QF			QF				

Tournament	1930	1931	1932	1933	1934	1935	1936	1937
Masters Tournament	NYF	NYF	NYF	NYF	42			T36
U.S. Open						WD	T11	CUT
The Open Championship								
PGA Championship								

Top 10
Did not play

NYF = tournament not yet founded
NT = no tournament
CUT = missed the half-way cut
R32, R16, QF, SF = round in which player lost in PGA Championship match play
WD = withdrew
"T" indicates a tie for a place
