= Jack Dowling =

American golfer (1890–1931)

Personal information
- Full name: John Dowling
- Nationality: United States
- Born: August 6, 1890 Glen Cove, New York
- Died: October 24, 1931 (aged 41) Glen Cove, New York
- Height: 5 ft 6 in (1.68 m)
- Weight: 118 lb (54 kg; 8.4 st)

Career
- Sport: Golf
- Status: Professional
- Former tour: PGA Tour
- Professional wins: 2

Number of wins by tour
- PGA Tour: 1
- Other: 1

Best results in major championships
- Masters Tournament: DNP
- PGA Championship: T5: 1916
- U.S. Open: T7: 1912
- The Open Championship: DNP

John "Jack" Dowling (August 6, 1890 – October 24, 1931) was an American professional golfer. He had two top-10 finishes in major championships: a tie for seventh in the 1912 U.S. Open and a quarterfinal loss (tie for fifth) in the inaugural 1916 PGA Championship. He won the 1921 Westchester Open and finished third in the same event in 1920.

He died suddenly of a massive heart attack in 1931 at the age of 41, cutting short a promising life and career.

== Early life ==
Dowling was born August 6, 1890, in Glen Cove, New York. He served as the assistant professional at Nassau Country Club in 1910 and was later the head professional at Scarsdale Golf Club in Hartsdale, New York, before moving on to Engineers Country Club in Roslyn, New York.

== Golf career ==
He grew up to be a small, wiry man who weighed only 118 pounds. In 1931, his golf swing was described by writer Ralph Trost of the Brooklyn Daily Eagle as "vivid ... it was a full, powerful, complete lash at the ball". Trost further elaborated on Dowling's appearance as being "thin as the proverbial rail and almost gaunt-looking".

=== 1911 Eastern PGA Four-Ball Tournament ===
In the Eastern Professional Golfers Association Four-Ball Tournament held at Rumson Country Club, Rumson, New Jersey, on August 9, 1911, Dowling was paired with Jack Hobens. They won the event easily by posting a round of 68 and beat the second place team of Jack Jolly and Tom Anderson, Jr. who carded a round of 74. The winners received a gold medal and $125 in prize money.

=== 1912 U.S. Open ===
The 1912 U.S. Open was the 18th U.S. Open, held August 1–2 at the Country Club of Buffalo in Amherst, New York, a suburb east of Buffalo. The course is now Grover Cleveland Golf Course, owned by Erie County. The Country Club of Buffalo relocated several miles east in 1926 to Williamsville. 20-year-old John McDermott successfully defended his U.S. Open title, two strokes ahead of runner-up Tom McNamara. Dowling carded rounds of 76-79-76-74=305, finished tied for seventh place, and won $45.

=== 1916 PGA Championship ===
The 1916 PGA Championship was the first PGA Championship and is now considered to be one of golf's major championships. It was played from October 10–14 at the Siwanoy Country Club in Bronxville, New York, just north of New York City. Dowling opened play in the tournament with a first round bye. In round two he defeated Emmett French 1 up on the first hole of a playoff (37th hole) but lost in the third round (quarterfinals) to Willie MacFarlane in a stubbornly contested match by the close score of 2 and 1.

Dowling had managed to gain entry into the tournament when a west coast player defaulted. To fill the open spot, the PGA held a playoff between Dowling and Clarence Hackney, the result of which was 72-75=147 for Dowling and a 165 total for Hackney. Macdonald Smith was to have been the third player competing for the open spot but he showed up late after the other two players had finished and was disqualified.

=== Red Cross four-ball match ===
Dowling, who was paired with Tom McNamara in a match held on September 15, 1918, at Scarsdale Golf Club, defeated Chick Evans (national amateur and open champion), and Bobby Jones, in an American Red Cross four-ball match by the score of 1 up. The proceeds from the match were donated to the Red Cross for its war-time efforts during World War I. Dowling took full advantage in winning the match since the event was contested on his home course.

== Death ==
On October 24, 1931, he played 36 holes of golf at Engineers Country Club in Roslyn, New York. After the two rounds were concluded, he went to his mother's house in nearby Glen Cove, New York, where he suffered an acute heart attack and died at age 41. The bus he was riding in after leaving the golf course had struck and killed a 7-year-old boy.

== Professional wins ==
=== PGA Tour wins (1) ===
- 1921 Westchester Open

=== Other wins (1) ===
- 1911 Eastern PGA Four-Ball Tournament

== Results in major championships ==
Tournament	1912	1913	1914	1915	1916	1917	1918	1919	1920
U.S. Open	T7	T27	?	T22	12	NT	NT	?	T38
PGA Championship	NYF	NYF	NYF	NYF	QF	NT	DNP	DNP	DNP

Note: Dowling played only in the U.S. Open and PGA Championship.

NYF = Tournament not yet founded
NT = No tournament
DNP = Did not play
R64, R32, R16, QF, SF = Round in which player lost in PGA Championship match play
"T" Indicates a tie for a place
Yellow background for top-10
