= Shennecossett Golf Course =

Golf course in Groton, Connecticut

Coordinates: 41°19′35″N 72°04′08″W

- Location in the United States Location in Connecticut.

Club information
- Location: 93 Plant Street; Groton, Connecticut, U.S.
- Established: 1898; 128 years ago
- Type: Public
- Owner: Town of Groton
- Tota holes: 18
- Tournaments: Connecticut Open (1910s event) : 1915, 1916; Connecticut Amateur : 1922, 1923, 1926; Connecticut Open: 1960
- Website: www.groton-ct.gov/departments/parksrec/shenny/index.php/
- Par: 71
- Length: 6,562 yards (6,000 m)

Shennecossett Golf Course is a municipal golf course located in Groton, Connecticut. The origins of the course go back to 1898 when Thomas Avery, a local resident, established a four-hole course on his farm. Shennecossett changed significantly over the next few decades, including a redesign by Donald Ross, eventually evolving into a full 18-hole country club. In the 1960s, the town of Groton purchased the property, transforming it into a municipal course. In 1997, the town performed a "land swap" with the pharmaceutical company Pfizer, losing three holes to the corporation but gaining three along the Thames River and Long Island Sound. The acquisition of these new holes has, according to Golf Magazine, "turn[ed] the perennially solid muni into one of the deals of the century."

== History ==
The early days of the course go back to 1898. Thomas Avery, descendent of one of Groton's first settlers, established a four hole course on his property with "fairways extending on both sides on his barn and farmhouse." Over the next few years five more holes were added to create a nine-hole course. The club was constructed on territory once occupied by the Pequot and Mohegan Native American tribes. The word "Shennecossett" means "level land" in the Pequot language.

During this era, a summer resort, the Griswold Hotel, was built adjacent to the course. During the early 20th century, the owner of the hotel, Morton Plant, was buying much local property, including property from Thomas Avery. Plant ultimately bought his golf course and, over the course of the years 1913 and 1914, added several more holes to create a full 18-hole course. A clubhouse was also constructed during this era and opened to the public on June 9, 1914. On August 10, 1916, the club became the 128th "active member" of the USGA. During this era, this property was referred to as "Shennecossett Country Club." Scottish-born pro Alex Smith was the club professional at the time. He "remained for many years." Smith broke the course record with a 69 during this era.

In 1926, the well-known golf course architect Donald Ross re-designed the course. Ross's design remained unchanged until the end of the century. During the early 20th century, Shennecossett hosted a number of significant tournaments including the Connecticut Open, a PGA Tour-level event. It also hosted the Connecticut Amateur several times in the 1920s. Club pro Smith was also able to attract some of the world's leading professionals to play exhibition matches at Shennecossett, including J.H. Taylor, Joe Kirkwood Sr., and Walter Hagen.

In 1945, the course was sold to Morton Mencher along with the adjacent Griswold Hotel. The name of the course was re-titled the Griswold Hotel and Country Club. Despite this, it was often informally known as "the Shennecossett" during this era. Under the new ownership, the course hosted the Connecticut Open, the state's official open, for the only time in its history. The legendary Harry Cooper served as club pro during this era.

In the 1960s, the town of Groton attempted to buy the course. In 1964, the town began negotiating with Milton Slosberg, the owner of the course. During this era, the town also applied for financial aid from the federal government to buy the course. The town requested for 50% of the funds to purchase the course. The application was rejected. The town's Recreation Commission still supported the project and supported the town's next application, this one to the state government. The town intended to apply for 50% aid as they had earlier to the federal government that would be worth $507,000. In early 1967, the State of Connecticut's Attorney General Office looked at the application. Despite initial reservations, they ultimately approved the application. On August 25, 1967, the town purchased the course. They placed a $450,000 down payment on the property. The state government would pay the remaining half.

In 1997, the club performed a "land swap" with the pharmaceutical company Pfizer. The corporation purchased territory consisting of three holes of the course but granted the club a significant amount of its territory. The club created three new holes with the new territory along the Thames River and Long Island Sound. Golf Magazine praised the addition of these new seaside holes, stating that they helped transform the "perennially solid muni into one of the deals of the century."

In 1994, The Hartford Courant noted that Shennecossett's par-3 4th hole was rated the top par-3 in the state by the state's club pros. In 2004, it was included in Golf Magazine's Thrifty 50, one of the top American courses recreational golfers could play for less than $50.

== Scorecard ==
In the early years, during the 1920s, the course measured 6,512 yards from the back tees. Overall, the total yardage has not changed much at Shennecossett over the ensuing century. In the early 21st century, the yardage measured from the back blue tees is 6,562 yards.

Shennecossett Golf Course
Tee	Rating/Slope	1	2	3	4	5	6	7	8	9	Out	10	11	12	13	14	15	16	17	18	In	Total
Par		4	4	4	3	5	4	4	5	3	36	4	4	3	4	4	3	4	4	5	35	71
SI	(Men)	15	13	3	7	9	1	5	11	17		2	8	18	10	4	16	6	12	14
Blue	M: 71.6/123	345	384	397	208	565	421	431	490	175	3,416	425	385	125	353	418	195	400	345	500	3,146	6,562
White	M: 69.1/121 W:75.4/128	335	374	367	180	530	411	400	475	155	3,227	360	290	120	330	380	170	375	330	480	2,835	6,062
Green	M: 65.2/112 W:70.8/124	335	292	341	158	464	320	342	445	108	2,805	340	290	90	314	324	129	322	258	387	2,483	5,288
SI	(Women)	5	11	13	15	1	7	9	3	17		8	14	16	6	2	18	10	12	4
