= Siwanoy Country Club =

Country club in Eastchester, New York

Coordinates: 40°56′25″N 73°48′45″W

- Interactive map of Siwanoy Country Club

Club information
- Location: Eastchester, New York, U.S.
- Established: 1901
- Type: Private
- Tota holes: 18
- Tournaments: PGA Championship (1916)
- Website: www.siwanoycc.com
- Designed by: Donald J. Ross
- Par: 71
- Length: 6,481 yards
- Course rating: 71.8

Siwanoy Country Club is a country club located in Eastchester, New York. The club hosted the first PGA Championship in 1916, which was won by Jim Barnes.

== History ==
Siwanoy Country Club of Mount Vernon was incorporated on May 20, 1901 at the Westchester County Clerk's office. The officers were president, Archibald M. Campbell; vice-president, Frank Mack vice-president; secretary, William N. G. Clarke; Arthur D. Stone, treasurer; and Alfred E. Taylor, team captain. The club got its name from the tribe that inhabited the shore of Long Island Sound. The club leased the Robert O. Glover estate with 40 acres of land and a house and barn. A 18 hole golf course and tennis courts were developed.

Tom Kerrigan joined the Siwanoy Country Club in 1914 and served as professional at the Club for a half century. In 1939 he shot the exceptionally low score of 62 on the par 71 Siwanoy course. He was often called "Tee Shot" Kerrigan due to his ability to hit unusually long drives. He is one of just a few who were granted lifetime honorary membership at the Club. The World War I fighter ace Eddie Rickenbacker also received that honor.
