= Wilfrid Reid =

Professional golfer, golf course architect

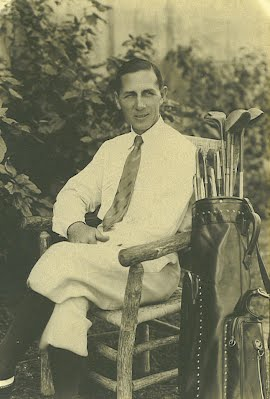
- Reid, c. 1926

Personal information
- Full name: Wilfrid Ewart Reid
- Nickname: Wilfie
- Nationality: England; United States
- Born: 3 November 1884 Bulwell, Nottingham, England
- Died: 24 November 1973 (aged 89) West Palm Beach, Florida, U.S.
- Spouse: Stella Toft
- Children: 4

Career
- Sport: Golf
- Turned professional: c. 1901
- Professional wins: 1

Best results in major championships
- Masters Tournament: DNP
- PGA Championship: T9: 1919
- U.S. Open: T4: 1916
- The Open Championship: T16: 1911

Achievements and awards
- Michigan Golf Hall of Fame: 1985

Wilfrid Ewart "Wilfie" Reid (3 November 1884 – 24 November 1973) was an English professional golfer and golf course designer. Reid was born in Bulwell, Nottingham, England, and died in West Palm Beach, Florida, United States. He posted three top-10 finishes in major championship tournaments.

== Early life ==
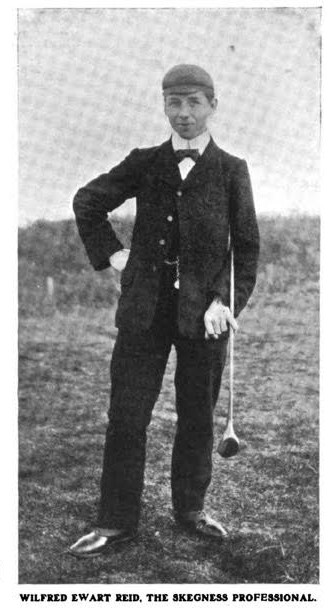
Reid, c. 1902

Reid, the son of Arthur Reid and his wife Elizabeth Reid née Potter, studied club and ball making under Tommy Armour's father, Willie, in Edinburgh, Scotland. A scratch golfer at 15, Reid turned professional at 17 and became head professional at Seacroft Golf Club in Skegness, England and was a protégé of Harry Vardon who helped him get a club professional job at La Boulie Golf Club, Versailles, France, in 1903. In 1905 he became the professional at Banstead Downs Golf Club in Sutton, London, England, for roughly nine years and was a successful tournament player. Reid – who was never short on confidence – was a fine competitive golfer despite being small of stature, and he beat his mentor, Vardon, on several occasions.

In March 1906, Reid married Stella Toft at Nottinghamshire, England. The couple had three daughters.

== 1913 U.S. Open ==
On 7 August 1913 Reid set sail from Liverpool aboard the RMS Celtic and visited America with Vardon and Ted Ray where they played in a number of tournaments including the famous 1913 U.S. Open in which he tied for 16th. Reid tied Vardon for the 2nd round lead and played with Francis Ouimet in the 3rd round. In 1915 he tied 10th. His best finish, a tie for fourth, came in the 1916 U.S. Open held at the Minikahda Club in Minneapolis, Minnesota.

== Emigration to America ==
In February 1915 Reid emigrated to America at the invitation of Clarence H. Geist to be the golf professional at Seaview Golf Club in Galloway, New Jersey, after the outbreak of World War I. He later, at the suggestion of the DuPont family, became the golf professional at the Wilmington Country Club, Wilmington, Delaware. He became a member of the PGA of America in 1917 and was appointed to the national PGA Executive Committee as a vice-president at large, a position he held for two years.

In August 1920 he was elected vice-president of the PGA of America and he was re-elected in 1921. In 1920 and 1921 he also held the office of secretary of the Southeastern Section PGA. In 1921 Reid obtained U.S. citizenship and in December of that year attended the founding meeting of the Philadelphia Section PGA and was a member of the organising committee. Later in 1929 he was the president of the Michigan Section PGA for three years.

== Golf career ==
Reid served as a professional at several of America's top clubs, including Country Club of Detroit, Grosse Pointe Farms, Grosse Pointe Farms, Michigan, Beverly Country Club, Chicago, Illinois, Broadmoor Golf Club, Colorado Springs, Colorado, Seminole Golf Club, North Palm Beach, Florida, and Atlantic City Country Club, Northfield, New Jersey. He won the 1926 Michigan PGA Championship and had 26 holes-in-one in his long playing career.

The border of his stationery – that he used to send customers' golf club orders to club-makers such as George Izett of Bailey & Izett Inc. – listed so many of his accomplishments as a golfer and course designer that there was very little room left for him to write his message.

== Golf course designer ==
Reid was also a golf course designer. Reid began designing golf courses at an early age and laid out courses in Europe and Britain before settling in the United States. He once estimated that he had designed 58 courses and remodeled some 43 others during his design career. While based in Michigan during the 1920s, he partnered with another club professional, William Connellan. The firm of Reid and Connellan designed some 20 courses in Michigan alone.

Reid retired to Florida in the early 1950s and consistently improved his game in both social and competitive rounds. Even into old age he continued to "beat his age" in score on his birthday.

== Death and legacy ==
Reid died on 24 November 1973 at West Palm Beach, Florida. He was posthumously inducted into the Michigan Golf Hall of Fame in 1985, and the Michigan Section PGA of America Golf Hall of Fame in 2015.

== Tournament wins ==
- 1926 Michigan PGA Championship

== Results in major championships ==
Tournament	1903	1904	1905	1906	1907	1908	1909
The Open Championship	T53	CUT	T37	CUT	T37	T35	T21

Tournament	1910	1911	1912	1913	1914	1915	1916	1917	1918	1919
U.S. Open	DNP	DNP	DNP	T16	DNP	T10	T4	NT	NT	T21
The Open Championship	T24	T16	T20	26	T41	NT	NT	NT	NT	NT
PGA Championship	NYF	NYF	NYF	NYF	NYF	NYF	R32	NT	NT	R16

Tournament	1920	1921	1922	1923	1924	1925	1926	1927	1928	1929
U.S. Open	T56	DNP	DNP	DNP	T47	T27	CUT	T48	DNP	CUT
PGA Championship	DNP	DNP	R64	R32	DNP	DNP	DNP	DNP	DNP	DNP

Tournament	1930	1931	1932	1933	1934	1935	1936	1937	1938	1939
U.S. Open	DNP	DNP	T49	DNP	DNP	DNP	DNP	DNP	DNP	CUT

Note: Reid never played in the Masters Tournament, founded in 1934.

NYF = Tournament not yet founded
NT = No tournament
DNP = Did not play
CUT = missed the half-way cut
R64, R32, R16, QF, SF = Round in which player lost in PGA Championship match play
"T" indicates a tie for a place
Yellow background for top-10

== Team appearances ==
- England–Scotland Professional Match (representing England): 1906 (winners) 1907 (winners), 1909 (winners), 1910 (winners), 1912 (tie), 1913 (winners)
- Coronation Match (representing the Professionals): 1911 (winners)
- Great Britain vs USA (representing America): 1921

== Delaware designs ==
- DuPont Country Club – the original DuPont Course, Wilmington, Delaware, 1921
- Wilmington Country Club – original course, now Ed Oliver Golf Club, Wilmington, Delaware
- Newark Country Club, Newark, Delaware, 1921

== Michigan designs ==
- Black River Country Club, (Reid, Connellan), Port Huron, Michigan, 1927
- Indian River Golf Club, (original 9 hole), (Reid), Indian River, Michigan
- Birmingham Country Club, (Reid), Birmingham, Michigan, 1916
- Water’s Edge Golf Course, (Reid), Grosse Ile, Michigan (9-hole course commissioned by Bunkie Knudsen)
- Brae Burn Golf Club, (original 9 hole - now the back 9 holes), (Reid, Connellan), Plymouth, Michigan, 1923
- Gaylord Country Club, (Reid), Gaylord, Michigan, 1924
- Indianwood Golf and Country Club – Old Course, (Reid, Conellan), Lake Orion, Michigan, 1925
- Tam-O'Shanter Country Club, (Reid, Connellan), West Bloomfield, Michigan, 1926 (redesigned)
- Bald Mountain Golf Course, (regulation course), (Reid, Connellan), Lake Orion, Michigan, 1929
- Flushing Valley Country Club, (original 9 hole), (Reid, Connellan), Flushing, Michigan, 1930

== Other designs ==
- Olympic Club – original Lakeside Golf Club course, San Francisco, 1917
- La Boulie Golf Club – France
- La Vallee course – Belgium

== Photo gallery ==
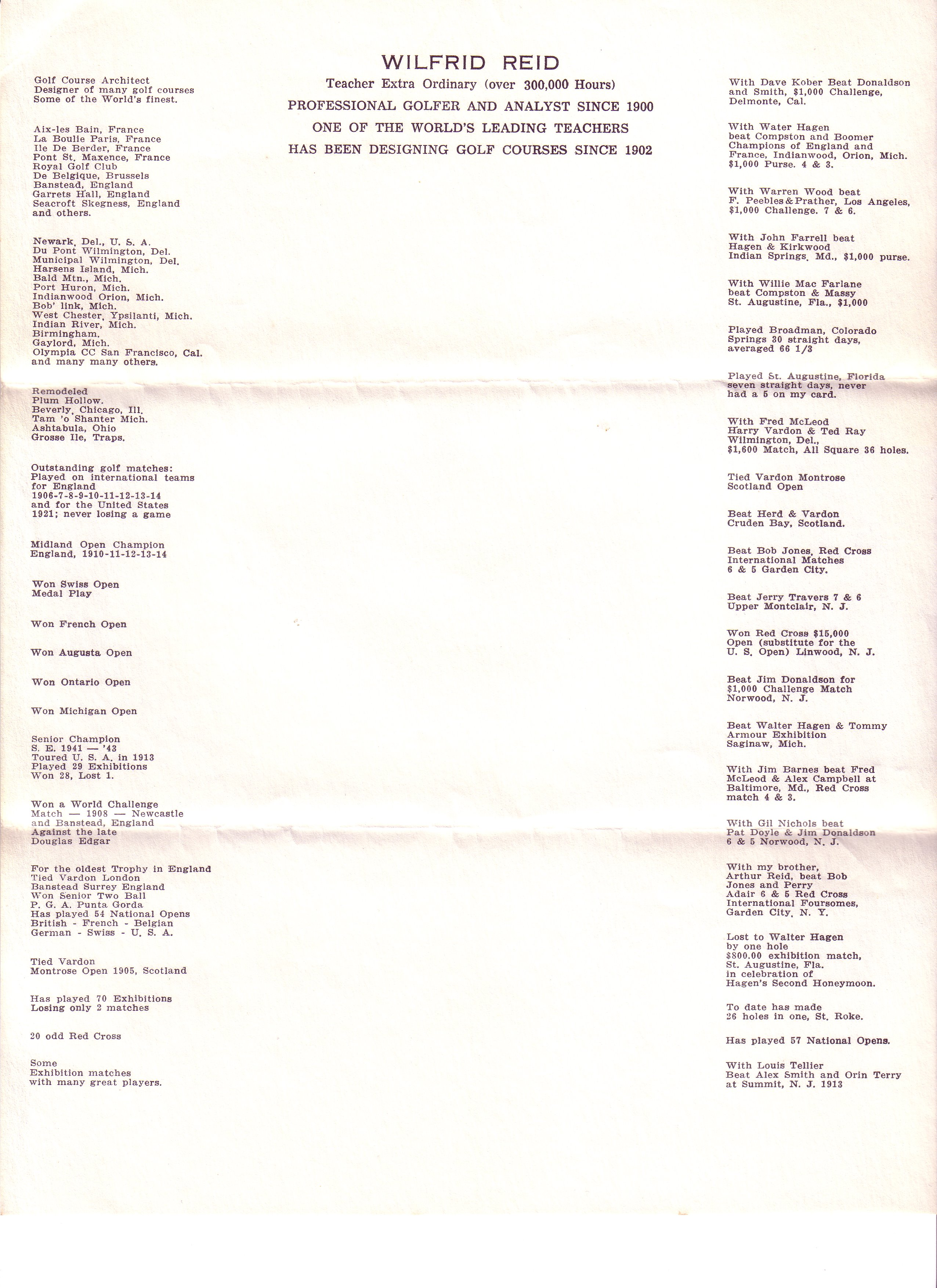
Copy of Wilfrid Reid's stationery

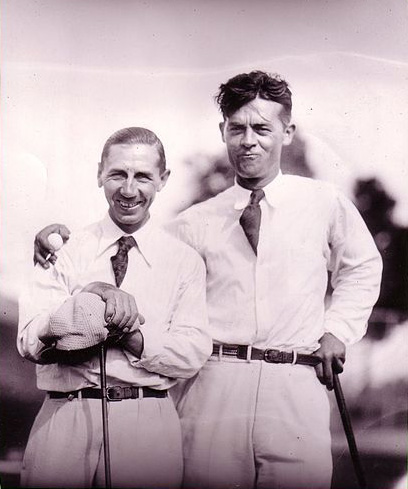
Golf professionals Wilfrid Reid (left) and Joe Devany circa 1925

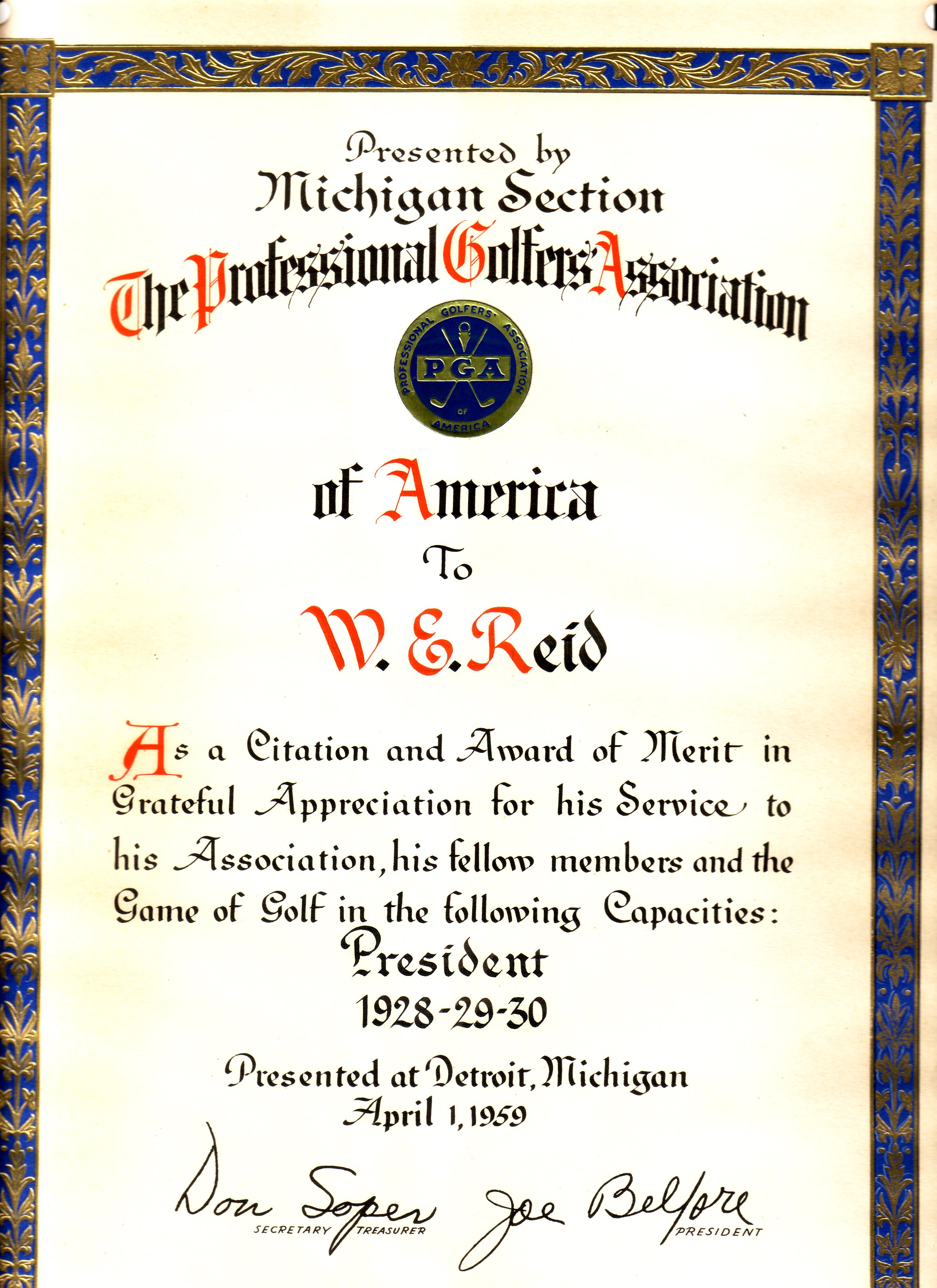
Michigan Section PGA President 1928-29-30

Wilfrid Reid

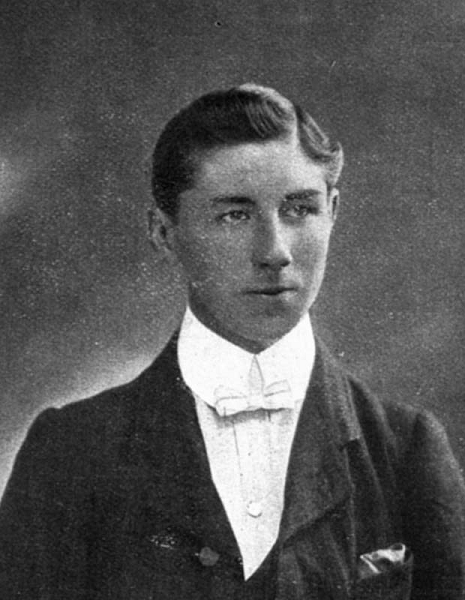
A young Wilfrid Reid

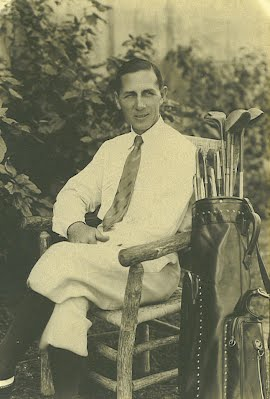
Reid seated near his golf clubs, c. 1926

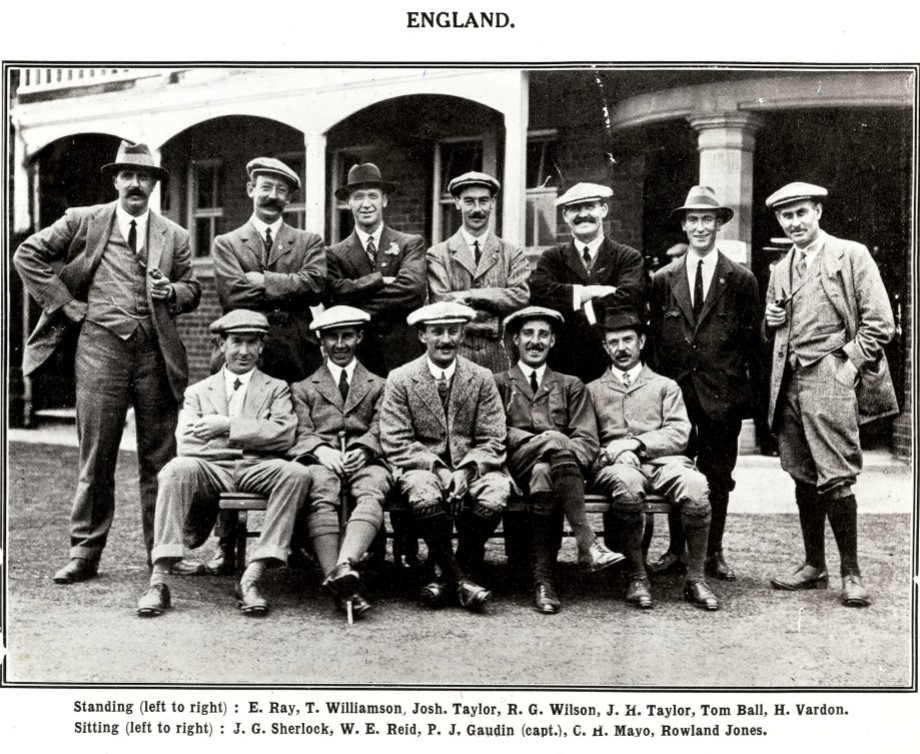
England Team 1913

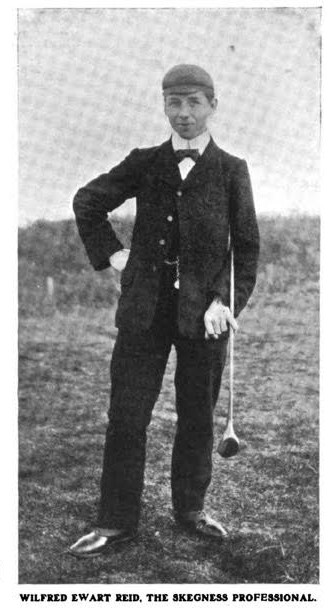
Professional Tournament, Kings Norton, October 1902. Head pro at Seacroft GC in Skegness

== See also ==
- Olympic Club Golf Club section
- The Greatest Game Ever Played: Harry Vardon, Francis Ouimet, and the Birth of Modern Golf by Mark Frost
- A Chronicle of the Philadelphia Section PGA and its Members by Peter C. Trenham, The Leaders and The Legends 1916 to 1921
- A Chronicle of the Philadelphia Section PGA and its Members by Peter C. Trenham, The Southeastern Section of the PGA 1916 to 1921

== Notes ==
His first name is often misspelled as "Wilfred", such as in the movie and book The Greatest Game Ever Played. Occasionally, his middle initial is incorrectly documented "A." as well.
