= Chick Evans =

American amateur golfer (1890–1979)

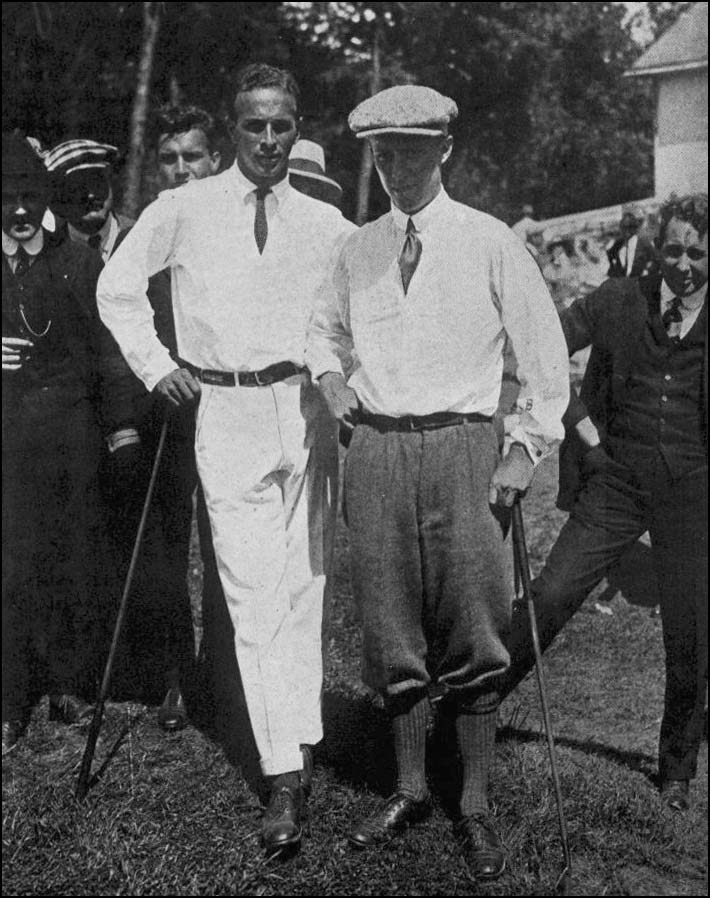
- Evans (right) and Robert A. Gardner, the finalists at the 1916 U.S. Amateur

Personal information
- Full name: Charles E. Evans Jr.
- Nickname: Chick
- Nationality: United States
- Born: July 18, 1890 Indianapolis, Indiana, U.S.
- Died: November 6, 1979 (aged 89) Chicago, Illinois, U.S.
- Height: 5 ft 10.5 in (1.79 m)
- Weight: 158 lb (72 kg; 11.3 st)
- Spouse: Esther Evans (m. 1927; died 1967)

Career
- Sport: Golf
- Status: Amateur
- Professional wins: 3

Best results in major championships (wins: 3)
- Masters Tournament: 51st: 1940
- PGA Championship: DNP
- U.S. Open: Won: 1916
- The Open Championship: T49: 1911
- U.S. Amateur: Won: 1916, 1920
- British Amateur: T9: 1911

Achievements and awards
- World Golf Hall of Fame: 1975 (member page)
- Bob Jones Award: 1960

Charles E. "Chick" Evans Jr. (July 18, 1890 – November 6, 1979) was a prominent American amateur golfer of the 1910s and 1920s. Evans, who won the 1910 Western Open, became the first amateur to win both the U.S. Open and U.S. Amateur in one year, a feat he achieved in 1916. Evans won the U.S. Amateur again in 1920, and was runner-up three times. Selected to the Walker Cup team in 1922, 1924, and 1928, he competed in a record 50 consecutive U.S. Amateurs in his long career. Evans achieved all of this while carrying only seven hickory-shafted clubs.

In addition to his golf career, Evans is known for founding the Evans Scholars Foundation, which provides a college scholarship for qualified caddies.

In 1960, Evans was voted the Bob Jones Award, the highest honor given by the United States Golf Association in recognition of distinguished sportsmanship in golf. He is a member of the World Golf Hall of Fame.

== Early life ==
Born in Indianapolis, Indiana, Evans' family moved to Chicago when he was eight years old, and he grew up on the north side of the city. His father, Charles Evans, was one of the most influential librarians of the 20th century. At the age of eight, he was first exposed to golf as a caddie at a Chicago course, the Edgewater Golf Club. He attended secondary school at the Evanston Academy, and won the 1907 and 1908 Western Interscholastic tournaments. He led in the founding of the Western Interscholastic Golf Association (WIGA), and led Evanston Academy to the 1908 WIGA team championship.

== Golf career ==
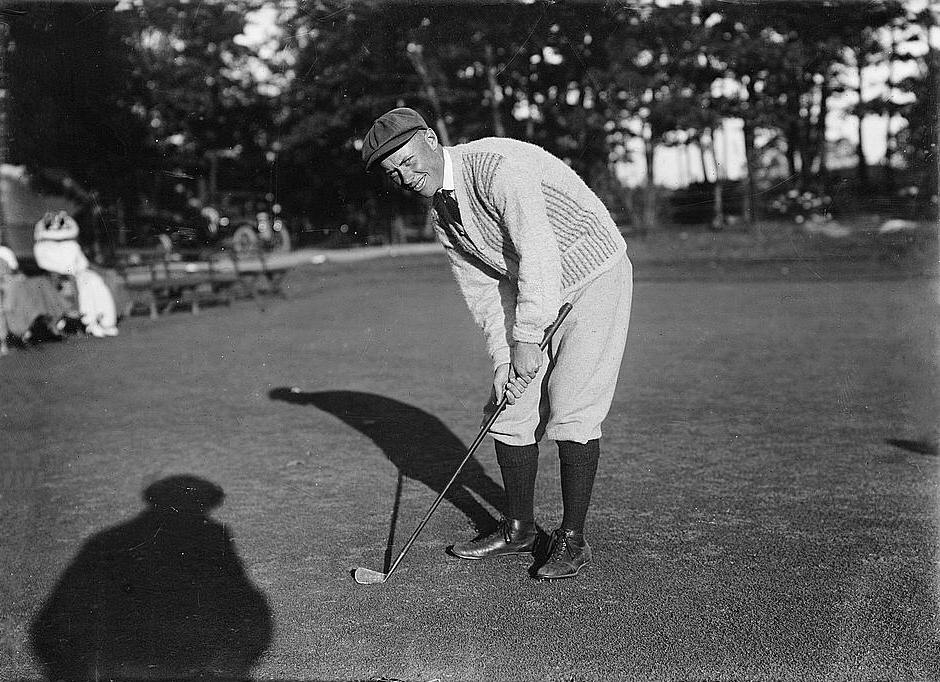
Evans on March 1, 1915

From these beginnings, Evans became one of the most acclaimed American amateur golfers of his time. The accomplishment that gave him the most contemporary publicity came in 1916, when he won both the U.S. Amateur and U.S. Open in the same year. Evans was the first person to accomplish this task, and only Bobby Jones has done it since.

Evans also won the Western Open in 1910 by defeating George Simpson 6 and 5 in the 36-hole final. He was the only amateur to do so until Scott Verplank in 1985. Simpson graciously praised Evans on his victory, saying “I’ve learned the greatest golf lesson of my life today. I consider it a greater honor to be beaten by the kind of golf you have played than to have remained out of the tournament because I did not fancy match play.”

Into the 1960s, Evans was an active participant in senior tournaments, and still competed in U.S. Amateur events, eventually setting a record of completing 50 of these championships. Evans played his last rounds of competitive golf in 1968, winning the Illinois Open that year. His last Western Amateur was in 1967.

After his retirement, Evans continued to attend events as a spectator and converse with the fans and players.

== Evans Scholars Foundation ==
After his wins in 1916, Evans was given several thousand dollars in royalties for recording golf instructions for the Brunswick Record Company, and in 1921 he received royalties from a golf book. If he had accepted this money Evans would have lost his amateur status. His mother suggested that he put the money to good use by sponsoring a scholarship fund for caddies.

Evans, who was unable to finish his own matriculation at Northwestern University, recalled that his mother "wouldn't think of accepting my money unless we could arrange it to be trusted to furnish educations for deserving qualified caddies." He said his mother "pointed out that the money came from golf and thus should go back into golf -- It was all her dream -- her idea."

Evans went to the Western Golf Association (WGA), an organization that ran the golf championships in the Midwest, to get their support for his scholarship. By 1930, the Evans Scholars Foundation had formed and two caddies, Harold Fink and Jim McGinnis, were named the first two Evans Scholars.

Chick Evans' long friendship with Chicago tax attorney, Carleton Blunt, had proved to be the catalyst for launching the Evans Scholars Foundation. Blunt, an avid golfer and philanthropist, supported Evans' vision for helping caddies attend colleges and universities across the country by raising the necessary funds for decades.

The criteria used to choose the recipients were scholarship, fellowship and leadership. Since that time, over 10,600 caddies have become Evans Scholars and attained college educations. The Evans scholarship program continues today as the largest scholarship organization in sports and the largest privately funded scholarship program in the United States.

Evans Scholarship houses exist at the following Universities: University of Colorado, University of Illinois, Northwestern University, Marquette University, University of Wisconsin, Purdue University, Ohio State University, Northern Illinois University, University of Missouri, Indiana University, University of Michigan, Michigan State University, Miami University and the University of Minnesota.

On February 19, 2014, the Evans Scholars Foundation announced their plans to build a new chapter house at the University of Oregon. It is the first new Scholarship House in 27 years. In addition to those universities at which houses exist, scholarship recipients attend several other universities around the country. More than 800 caddies currently attend college on an Evans Scholarship.

== Death and legacy ==
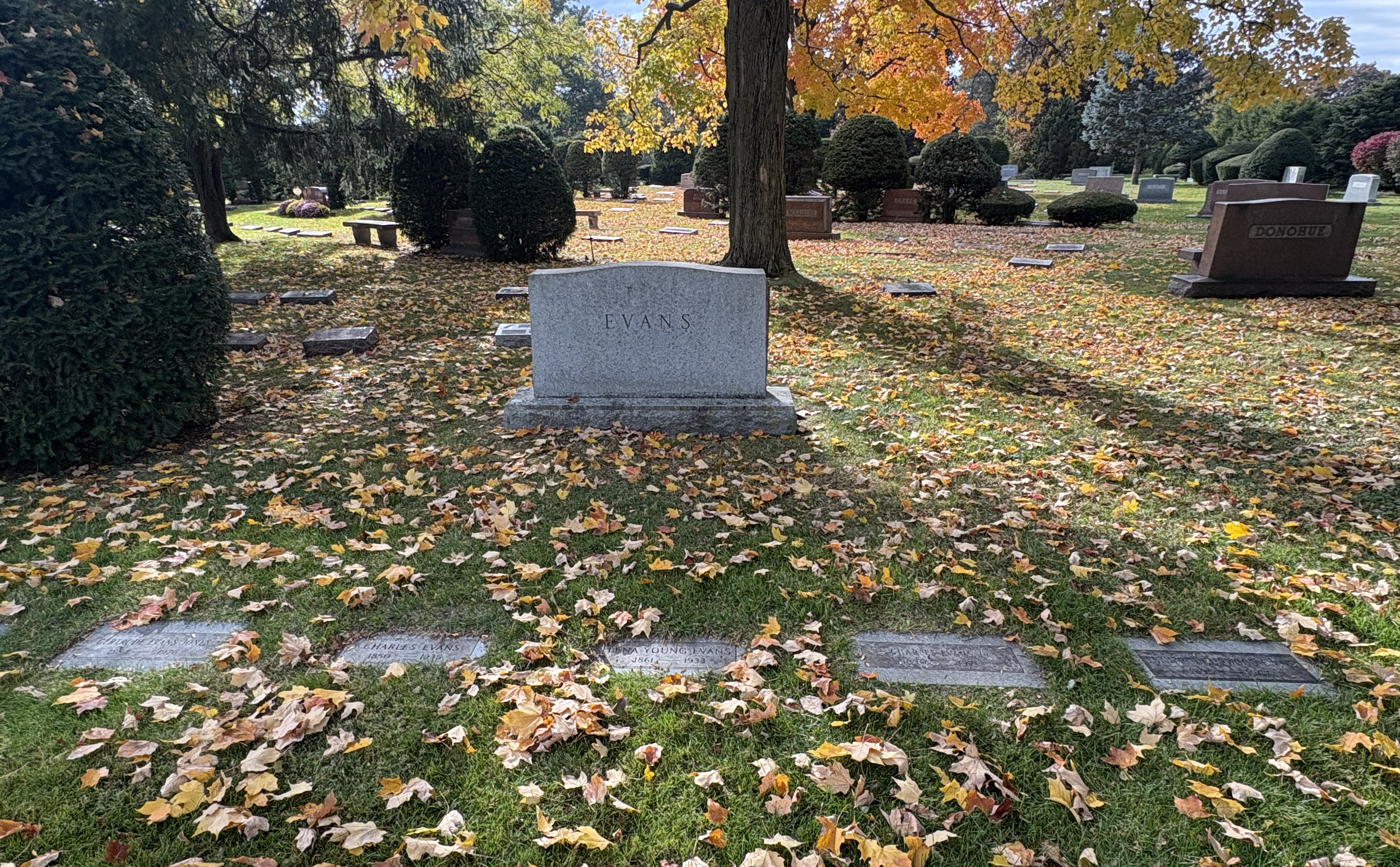
Evans's grave (second from right) at Memorial Park Cemetery

Evans died on November 6, 1979, at age 89, and was buried at Memorial Park Cemetery in Skokie, Illinois. His wife, Esther, had died in 1967 after 40 years of marriage. They had no children. The Chick Evans Golf Course in Morton Grove, a north suburb of Chicago, is named in his honor.

== Tournament wins (22) ==
- 1907 Chicago Amateur, Western Junior, Western Interscholastic
- 1908 Chicago Amateur, Western Interscholastic
- 1909 Western Amateur
- 1910 Western Open
- 1911 French Open Amateur Championship, North and South Amateur, Chicago Amateur
- 1912 Western Amateur
- 1914 Western Amateur, Chicago District Amateur
- 1915 Western Amateur
- 1916 U.S. Open, U.S. Amateur
- 1920 U.S. Amateur, Western Amateur
- 1921 Western Amateur
- 1922 Western Amateur
- 1923 Western Amateur
- 1925 Kansas City Open

== Professional major championships ==
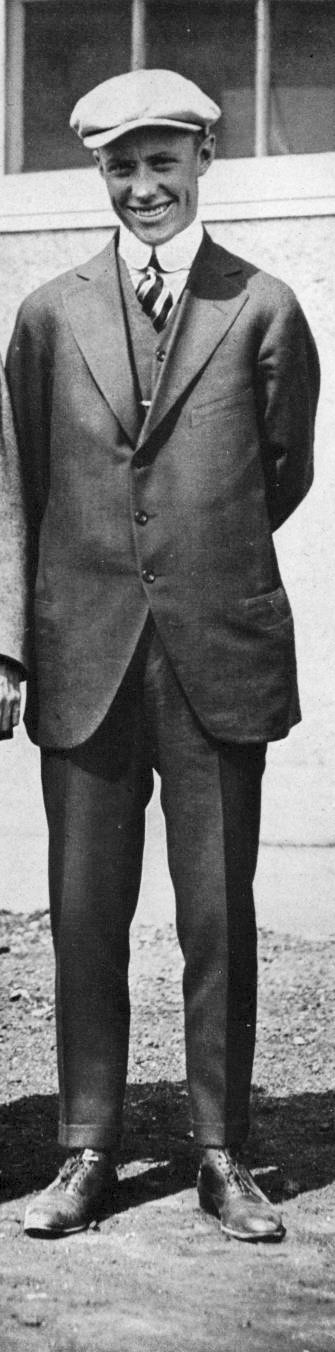
Evans in 1915

=== Wins (1) ===
Year	Championship	54 Holes	Winning score	Margin	Runner-up
1916	U.S. Open	3 shot lead	−2 (70-69-74-73=286)	2 strokes	(Scotland) Jock Hutchison

=== Results timeline ===
Note: As an amateur, Evans was ineligible to play in the PGA Championship.

Tournament	1911	1912	1913	1914	1915	1916	1917	1918	1919
U.S. Open				2 LA	18	1 LA	NT	NT	T9 LA
The Open Championship	T49				NT	NT	NT	NT	NT

Tournament	1920	1921	1922	1923	1924	1925	1926	1927	1928	1929
U.S. Open	T6 LA	4 LA	16	T14	T10		T13	CUT	CUT	
The Open Championship										

Tournament	1930	1931	1932	1933	1934	1935	1936	1937	1938	1939
Masters Tournament	NYF	NYF	NYF	NYF						
U.S. Open	T54						T50			
The Open Championship										

Tournament	1940	1941	1942	1943	1944	1945	1946	1947	1948	1949
Masters Tournament	51			NT	NT	NT				
U.S. Open		CUT	NT	NT	NT	NT		CUT	CUT	CUT
The Open Championship	NT	NT	NT	NT	NT	NT				

Tournament	1950	1951	1952	1953	1954	1955	1956	1957	1958	1959	1960
Masters Tournament				64						CUT	CUT
U.S. Open					CUT						
The Open Championship											

Win
Top 10
Did not play

LA = Low amateur
NYF = Tournament not yet founded
NT = No tournament
CUT = missed the half-way cut
"T" indicates a tie for a place

== Amateur major championships ==
=== Wins (2) ===
Year	Championship	Winning score	Runner-up
1916	U.S. Amateur	4 & 3	(United States) Robert A. Gardner
1920	U.S. Amateur	7 & 6	(United States) Francis Ouimet

=== Results timeline ===
Tournament	1909	1910	1911	1912	1913	1914	1915	1916	1917	1918	1919
U.S. Amateur	SF M	SF	SF	2 M	SF M	R32	R32	1	NT	NT	R16
The Amateur Championship			R16			R32	NT	NT	NT	NT	NT

Tournament	1920	1921	1922	1923	1924	1925	1926	1927	1928	1929
U.S. Amateur	1	SF	2	R32 M	R32	DNQ	QF	2	R32	DNQ
The Amateur Championship		R64					R128			

Tournament	1930	1931	1932	1933	1934	1935	1936	1937	1938	1939
U.S. Amateur	DNQ	DNQ	QF	R32	QF	R256	R64	QF		DNQ
The Amateur Championship										

Tournament	1940	1941	1942	1943	1944	1945	1946	1947	1948	1949
U.S. Amateur	DNQ	DNQ	NT	NT	NT	NT	DNQ	R256	R128	R256
The Amateur Championship	NT	NT	NT	NT	NT	NT	R64			R128

Tournament	1950	1951	1952	1953	1954	1955	1956	1957	1958	1959
U.S. Amateur	R256	R256	R128	R256	R256	R128	R256	R64	R64	R128
The Amateur Championship	R512		R128	R256		R64				

Tournament	1960	1961	1962
U.S. Amateur	R256	R256	R256
The Amateur Championship			

Win
Top 10
Did not play

M = Medalist
DNQ = Did not qualify for match play portion
R256, R128, R64, R32, R16, QF, SF = Round in which player lost in match play

Sources: Amateur Championship: 1911, 1914, 1921, 1926, 1946, 1949, 1950, 1952, 1953, 1955

== U.S. national team appearances ==
Amateur

- Walker Cup: 1922 (winners), 1924 (winners), 1928 (winners)
