= Jim Barnes (golfer) =

English professional golfer (1886–1966)

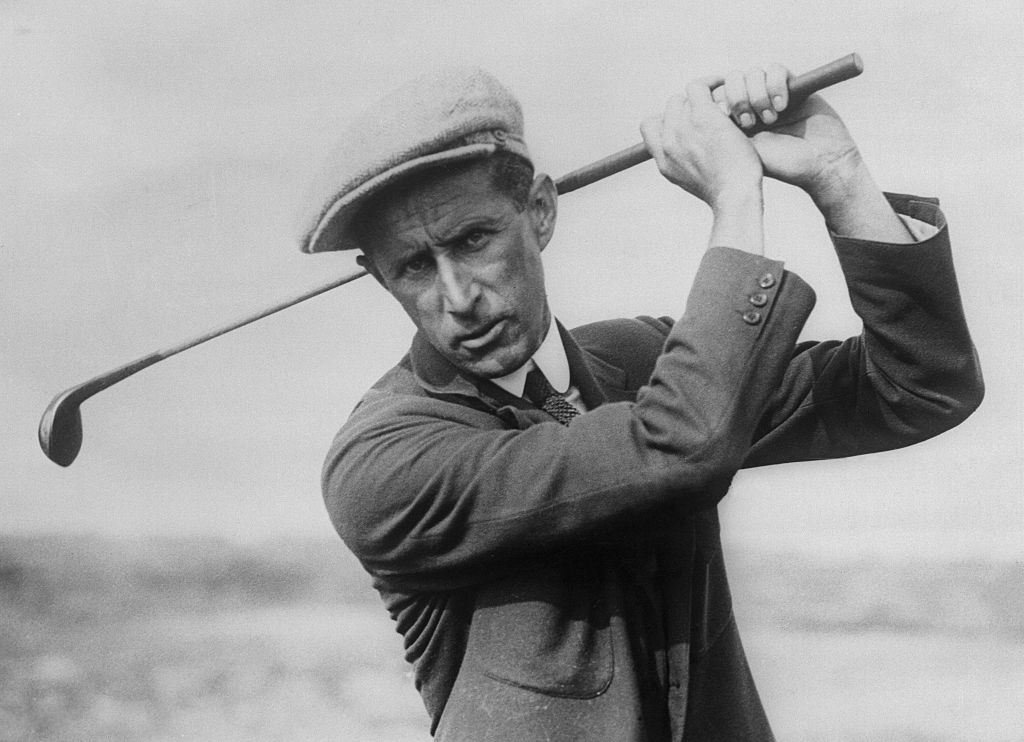

Personal information
- Full name: James Martin Barnes
- Nicknames: Long Jim; Big Jim
- Nationality: England
- Born: April 8, 1886 Lelant, Cornwall, England
- Died: May 24, 1966 (aged 80) East Orange, New Jersey, U.S.
- Height: 6 ft 4 in (193 cm)
- Spouse: Caroline Mary Barnes
- Children: 2

Career
- Sport: Golf
- Turned professional: 1906
- Former tour: PGA Tour
- Professional wins: 29

Number of wins by tour
- PGA Tour: 22
- Other: 7

Best results in major championships (wins: 4)
- Masters Tournament: NYF
- PGA Championship: Won: 1916, 1919
- U.S. Open: Won 1921
- The Open Championship: Won 1925

Achievements and awards
- World Golf Hall of Fame: 1989 (member page)

James Martin Barnes (April 8, 1886 – May 24, 1966) was an English professional golfer who was a leading figure in the early years of professional golf in the United States. He was the first Briton to win three different modern professional major championships.

== Early life ==
Barnes was born on April 8, 1886, in Lelant, Cornwall. Barnes was like many golfers of his era, and worked as a caddie and a club-maker's apprentice while growing up.

== Professional career ==
As a young adult, Barnes moved to the United States. However, he never became an American citizen. In 1906, he turned professional. He arrived in San Francisco, and later worked in Vancouver, British Columbia; Spokane, Washington; and Tacoma, Washington, and then at The Broadmoor in Colorado Springs. From 1914 to 1917 Jim was the head golf professional at Whitemarsh Valley Country Club, a classic George Thomas design just outside of Philadelphia. While there, Jim won the inaugural PGA Championship in 1916. In 1917 Jim won the Philadelphia Open Championship and the Western Open. In 1919 he won his second consecutive PGA Championship. The Championship was not contested in 1917 and 1918 because of the war.

From 1923 to 1926, he was resident professional at the Temple Terrace Golf and Country Club in Temple Terrace, Florida, which hosted the 1925 Florida Open (dubbed "The Greatest Field of Golfers Ever to Play in Florida"), as well as the 1926 Florida Open with over one hundred contestants and a $5,000 cash prize. In 1925–26 his good friend and fellow golfer Fred McLeod wintered with him, and they worked with James Kelly Thomson from North Berwick.

He won nine majors, with four of them the modern professional majors. Many golfers and media covering the sport at the time, according to golf journalist Dan Jenkins, the Western Open and North and South Open titles he won at the time were declared majors.

- PGA Championship: 1916, 1919
- U.S. Open: 1921
- The Open Championship: 1925
- Western Open: 1914, 1917, 1919
- North and South Open: 1916, 1919

Barnes' two PGA titles were the first in the event; there was no tournament in 1917 or 1918 because of World War I. His winning margin in the 1921 U.S. Open was nine strokes, a record which was not broken until Tiger Woods won by 15 strokes in 2000.

Barnes was one of the most prolific tournament winners of the first few seasons of the PGA Tour, which was also founded in 1916. He won 22 times on the tour in total. He led the tournament winners list in four seasons: 1916 with three, 1917 with two (shared with Mike Brady), 1919 with five and 1921 with four. His win in the 1937 Long Island Open marked the first PGA Tour win by a player past his 50th birthday.

Barnes also authored several books on golf technique. Perhaps his most important and groundbreaking contribution was his 200 plus page book, Picture Analysis of Golf Strokes, published in 1919. The hundreds of photos demonstrating the proper techniques were all taken on the grounds of Whitemarsh Valley Country Club.

== Personal life ==
Barnes was also known as "Long Jim" for his height of 6 ft 4 in (1.93 m).

Late in life, Barnes moved west to the San Francisco Bay Area where he resided for many years. He died at his home in East Orange, New Jersey. He is buried in Orange's Rosedale Cemetery.

== Awards and honors ==
- In 1940, Barnes was honored as one of the 12 golfers to be inducted in the PGA's inaugural Hall of Fame.
- In 1989, he was posthumously inducted into the World Golf Hall of Fame.

== Professional wins (29) ==
=== PGA Tour wins (22) ===
- 1914 (1) Western Open
- 1916 (3) North and South Open, Connecticut Open, **PGA Championship**
- 1917 (2) Western Open, Philadelphia Open Championship
- 1919 (5) North and South Open, Shawnee Open, Western Open, **PGA Championship**, Southern Open
- 1920 (1) Shawnee Open
- 1921 (4) Deland Open, Florida Open, **U.S. Open**, Main Line Open
- 1922 (1) California Open Championship
- 1923 (1) Corpus Christi Open
- 1925 (1) **The Open Championship**
- 1926 (1) Mid-Winter Tournament
- 1930 (1) Cape Cod Open
- 1937 (1) Long Island Open

Modern major championships are shown in bold.

=== Other wins ===
Note: This list may be incomplete

- 1909 Northwest Open
- 1911 Northwest Open
- 1912 Northwest Open
- 1913 Northwest Open
- 1915 Connecticut Open
- 1921 California State Open
- 1939 New Jersey State Open

== Major championships ==
=== Wins (4) ===
Year	Championship	54 holes	Winning score	Margin	Runner(s)-up
1916	PGA Championship	n/a	1 up		(Scotland) (United States) Jock Hutchison
1919	PGA Championship (2)	n/a	6 & 5		(Scotland) (United States) Fred McLeod
1921	U.S. Open	7 shot lead	+9 (69-75-73-72=289)	9 strokes	(United States) Walter Hagen, (Scotland) (United States) Fred McLeod
1925	The Open Championship	5 shot deficit	70-77-79-74=300	1 stroke	(England) Archie Compston, (Jersey) Ted Ray

Note: The PGA Championship was match play until 1958

=== Results timeline ===
Tournament	1912	1913	1914	1915	1916	1917	1918	1919
U.S. Open	T18	T4	T13	T4	3			T11
The Open Championship						NT	NT	NT
PGA Championship	NYF	NYF	NYF	NYF	**1**	NT	NT	**1**

Tournament	1920	1921	1922	1923	1924	1925	1926	1927	1928	1929
U.S. Open	T6	**1**	T24	T12		T29	CUT	T24	T36	T21
The Open Championship	6	T6	T2		T9	**1**	T18	T17	T6	7
PGA Championship	R16	2	R32	QF	2		R32		R16	

Tournament	1930	1931	1932
U.S. Open	T39		T55
The Open Championship	T6		
PGA Championship	DNQ		

Note: Barnes never played in the Masters Tournament.

Win
Top 10
Did not play

NYF = Tournament not yet founded
NT = No tournament
CUT = missed the half-way cut
DNQ = Did not qualify for match play portion
R32, R16, QF, SF = Round in which player lost in PGA Championship match play
"T" indicates a tie for a place

=== Summary ===
Tournament	Wins	2nd	3rd	Top-5	Top-10	Top-25	Events	Cuts made
Masters Tournament	0	0	0	0	0	0	0	0
U.S. Open	1	0	1	4	5	12	17	16
The Open Championship	1	1	0	2	8	10	10	10
PGA Championship	2	2	0	5	7	9	9	9
Totals	4	3	1	11	20	31	36	35

- Most consecutive cuts made – 27 (1912 U.S. Open – 1926 Open)
- Longest streak of top-10s – 8 (1919 PGA – 1922 Open)

== See also ==
- List of golfers with most PGA Tour wins
- List of men's major championships winning golfers
