= Mike Brady (golfer) =

American professional golfer (1887–1972)

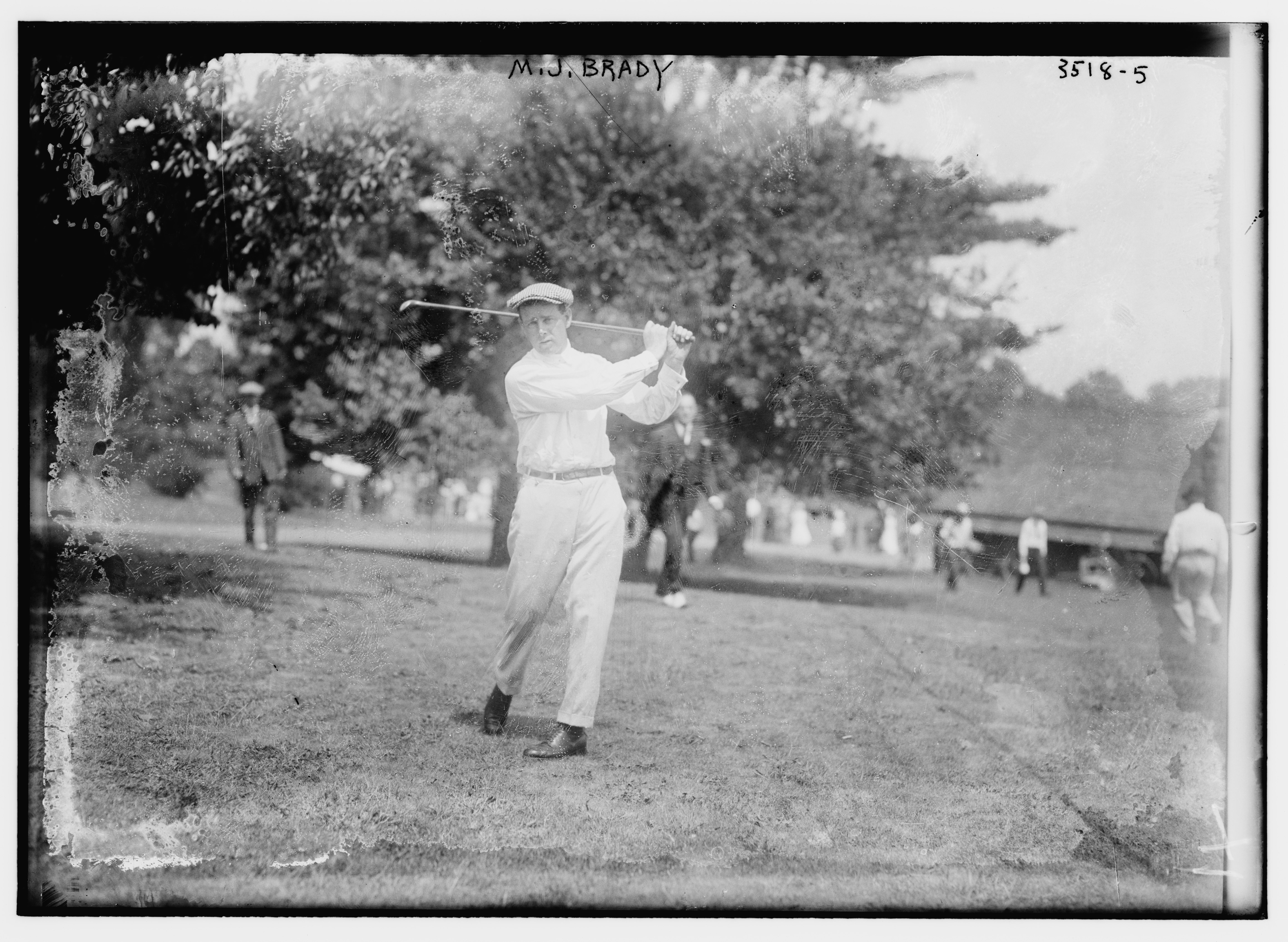
- Brady in 1915

Personal information
- Full name: Michael Joseph Brady
- Nickname: King
- Nationality: United States
- Born: April 15, 1887 Brighton, Massachusetts, U.S.
- Died: December 3, 1972 (aged 85) Dunedin, Florida, U.S.

Career
- Sport: Golf
- Status: Professional
- Professional wins: 11

Number of wins by tour
- PGA Tour: 9
- Other: 2

Best results in major championships
- Masters Tournament: NYF
- PGA Championship: T9: 1916, 1919, 1925, 1926
- U.S. Open: 2nd: 1911, 1919
- The Open Championship: DNP

Michael Joseph Brady (April 15, 1887 – December 3, 1972) was an American professional golfer.

== Early life ==
Brady was born in Brighton, Massachusetts, on April 15, 1887.

== Professional career ==
Brady won nine PGA events between 1916 and 1926. He lost in a three-way playoff to John McDermott in the 1911 U.S. Open. He lost to Walter Hagen in a celebrated playoff in the 1919 U.S. Open at Brae Burn Country Club. Hagen promptly resigned his club pro job at Oakland Hills Country Club after winning and Oakland Hills promptly hired Brady. Brady subsequently won the 1922 Western Open at Oakland Hills.

== Personal life ==
Brady died in Dunedin, Florida, at the age of 85.

== Professional wins (11) ==
=== PGA Tour wins (9) ===
- 1916 (1) Massachusetts Open
- 1917 (2) North and South Open, Kilkare Tournament
- 1920 (1) Florida East Coast Open
- 1922 (1) Western Open
- 1923 (1) Massachusetts Open
- 1924 (1) Metropolitan Open
- 1925 (1) Westchester Open
- 1926 (1) Miami Pro-Am Tournament

=== Other wins ===
- 1914 Massachusetts Open
- 1920 Michigan Open

== Results in major championships ==
Tournament	1906	1907	1908	1909
U.S. Open	49	T16	T17	12
PGA Championship	NYF			

Tournament	1910	1911	1912	1913	1914	1915	1916	1917	1918	1919
U.S. Open	WD	2	T3	14	T5	6	T9	NT	NT	2
PGA Championship	NYF						R16	NT	NT	R16

Tournament	1920	1921	1922	1923	1924	1925	1926	1927	1928	1929
U.S. Open	T14	T14	T8	T20	9	7	T16	CUT	CUT	
PGA Championship			R32		R32	R16	R16			

Tournament	1930	1931	1932
U.S. Open			T49
PGA Championship			

Note: The Masters Tournament was not yet founded and Brady did not play in The Open Championship.

Win
Top 10
Did not play

NYF = Tournament not yet founded
NT = No tournament
CUT = Missed the half-way cut
WD = Withdrew
R32, R16, QF, SF = Round in which player lost in PGA Championship match play
"T" indicates a tie for a place

== Team appearances ==
- France–United States Professional Match (representing the United States): 1913
