= Jock Hutchison =

Scottish-American professional golfer (1884–1977)

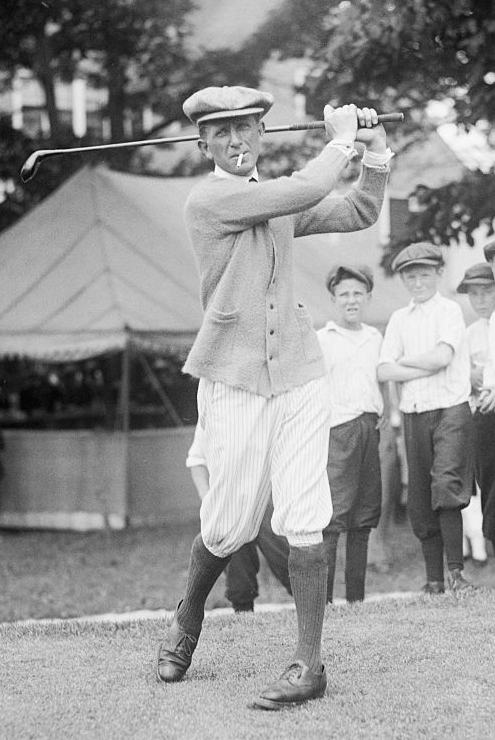
- Hutchison in 1921

Personal information
- Full name: Jack Falls Hutchison
- Nickname: Jock
- Nationality: Scotland; United States
- Born: June 6, 1884 St Andrews, Fife, Scotland
- Died: September 27, 1977 (aged 93) Evanston, Illinois, U.S.
- Height: 5 ft 8 in (1.73 m)
- Spouse: Maire

Career
- Sport: Golf
- Status: Professional
- Professional wins: 20

Number of wins by tour
- PGA Tour: 14
- Other: 6

Best results in major championships (wins: 2)
- Masters Tournament: 43rd: 1941
- PGA Championship: Won: 1920
- U.S. Open: 2nd/T2: 1916, 1920
- The Open Championship: Won: 1921

Achievements and awards
- World Golf Hall of Fame: 2011 (member page)

Jack Falls "Jock" Hutchison (June 6, 1884 – September 27, 1977) was a Scottish-born professional golfer who was based in the United States.

== Early life ==
Hutchison was born in St Andrews, Fife, Scotland, the son of William and Helen (née Falls). His name was registered as John Waters Hutchison, Waters being the maiden name of William's mother. He appears in the 1901 census as John Hutchison, golf caddie. He had an older brother who was also a golf player, Tom Hutchison.

== Golf career ==
Hutchison later moved to the United States and became a naturalized citizen in 1920. He was known there as Jack Falls Hutchison or John Falls Hutchison. He won two major championships, the PGA Championship in 1920 and the Open Championship at St Andrews in 1921. His 1921 victory was the first by a U.S.-based player; the following year Walter Hagen became the first U.S.-born winner.

In 1937, Hutchison won the inaugural PGA Seniors' Championship at Augusta National Golf Club and in 1947 he won the event for a second time.

Beginning in 1963, Hutchison was one of the two men who served as honorary starters for The Masters (along with 1908 U.S. Open champion Fred McLeod), until ailments prevented him from hitting one of the honorary tee shots in 1973.

== Death ==
Hutchinson died on September 27, 1977. It came just two days before Masters co-founder Clifford Roberts' own death. He was 93 years old. He died in Evanston, Illinois.

== Awards and honors ==
In 2011, Hutchinson was inducted into the World Golf Hall of Fame.

== Professional wins (20) ==
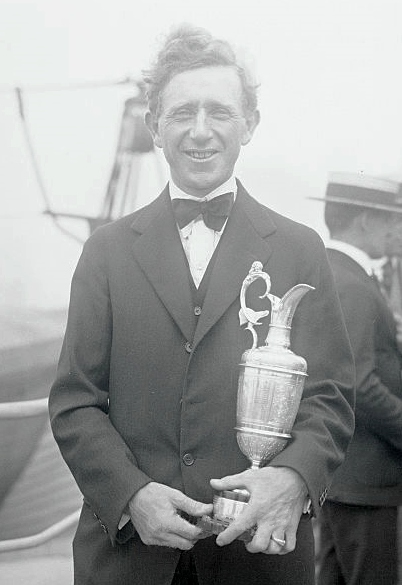
Hutchison with The Open Championship trophy in 1921

=== PGA Tour wins (14) ===
- 1918 (1) Florida West Coast Open
- 1920 (4) West Baden Springs Hotel, Illinois Open, Western Open, **PGA Championship**
- 1921 (3) White Sulphur Springs Open, **The Open Championship**, North and South Open
- 1922 (2) Columbia Country Club Open, Northern California Open
- 1923 (1) Western Open
- 1925 (1) Illinois PGA Championship
- 1926 (1) Illinois PGA Championship
- 1928 (1) Florida West Coast Open

Majors championship wins shown in bold.

=== Other wins (4) ===
- 1916 Pennsylvania Open Championship
- 1917 National Patriotic Tournament
- 1921 Kinghorn Tournament
- 1923 Illinois PGA Championship

=== Senior wins (2) ===
- 1937 PGA Seniors' Championship
- 1947 PGA Seniors' Championship

== Major championships ==
=== Wins (2) ===
Year	Championship	54 holes	Winning score	Margin	Runner-up
1920	PGA Championship	n/a	1 up		(England) James Douglas Edgar
1921	The Open Championship	4 shot deficit	72-75-79-70=296	Playoff^{1}	(England) Roger Wethered

^{1} Hutchison defeated Wethered in a 36-hole playoff by nine strokes: Hutchison 74-76=150; Wethered 77-82=159.
Note: The PGA Championship was match play until 1958

=== Results timeline ===
Tournament	1908	1909
U.S. Open	T8	T23
The Open Championship		

Tournament	1910	1911	1912	1913	1914	1915	1916	1917	1918	1919
U.S. Open	T8	T5	T23	T16	WD	T8	2	NT	NT	T3
The Open Championship						NT	NT	NT	NT	NT
PGA Championship	NYF	NYF	NYF	NYF	NYF	NYF	2	NT	NT	QF

Tournament	1920	1921	1922	1923	1924	1925	1926	1927	1928	1929
U.S. Open	T2	T18	T8	3	T31	T27	CUT	23	T41	CUT
The Open Championship		**1**	4							
PGA Championship	**1**	R16	QF		R32				QF	

Tournament	1930	1931	1932	1933	1934	1935	1936	1937	1938	1939
Masters Tournament	NYF	NYF	NYF	NYF		T51	WD	WD		WD
U.S. Open	WD		T45							
The Open Championship										
PGA Championship										

Tournament	1940	1941	1942	1943	1944	1945	1946	1947	1948	1949
Masters Tournament				NT	NT	NT				
U.S. Open	T23	57	NT	NT	NT	NT	CUT		CUT	CUT
The Open Championship	NT	NT	NT	NT	NT	NT				
PGA Championship				NT						

Tournament	1950	1951	1952	1953	1954	1955	1956	1957	1958	1959
Masters Tournament				WD	WD	WD	WD	WD	WD	WD
U.S. Open					CUT					CUT
The Open Championship										
PGA Championship										

Tournament	1960	1961	1962
Masters Tournament	WD	WD	WD
U.S. Open			
The Open Championship			
PGA Championship			

Win
Top 10
Did not play

NYF = Tournament not yet founded
NT = No tournament
WD = Withdrew
CUT = missed the half-way cut
R64, R32, R16, QF, SF = Round in which player lost in PGA Championship match play
"T" indicates a tie for a place
