= Jack Forrester =

Scottish-American golfer (1894–1964)

Personal information
- Full name: John McIntyre Forrester
- Nickname: Jack
- Nationality: Scotland; United States
- Born: 19 February 1894 Glasgow, Scotland
- Died: 4 August 1964 (aged 70) Chatham, Massachusetts
- Spouses: Anne M. Forrester, nee Currie (1897–1980)
- Children: John Jr. (1922–2005), James (1928–2010)

Career
- Sport: Golf
- Turned professional: c. 1911
- Former tour: PGA Tour
- Professional wins: 2

Number of wins by tour
- PGA Tour: 2

Best results in major championships
- Masters Tournament: DNP
- PGA Championship: T17: 1921, 1923, 1924
- U.S. Open: 4th: 1923
- The Open Championship: DNP

John McIntyre Forrester (19 February 1894 – 4 August 1964) was a Scottish-American professional golfer who played in the early-to-mid 20th century. His best finish in a major championship was fourth in the 1923 U.S. Open. He won the 1929 New Jersey PGA Championship while serving as head professional at Baltusrol Golf Club.

== Early life ==
Forrester was born at 85 Port Street, Glasgow, Scotland, the son of James Forrester (died 1957) and Jane McIntyre (died 1916). His father was a ship rigger and boatman in the Coastguard Service. The family home was at Cairnryan House, Inch, Wigtown. Forrester and his siblings attended the Nicholson Institute at Stornoway.

In May 1905, he moved to North Berwick and the family lived in the Coastguard Cottages on Melbourne Road. In 1905, Jack and his younger brother William toted bags as caddies on the West Links. Jack attended North Berwick Public School before becoming a postman. As a member of Rhodes Golf Club in North Berwick, he won the Haldane Cup and Maxwell Shield in 1911 at the age of 17. He also posted an amateur record score of 71 for the Glen Course in 1913.

== Military service in WW I ==
At the start of World War I, Forrester enlisted in the 3rd Battalion Argyll and Sutherland Highlanders in North Berwick on 29 August 1914 and was subsequently posted with the Royal Gurkha Rifles and fought in France and Flanders for almost a year before being transferred to Salonica in Macedonia for three years. He contracted malaria in 1916 and spent time in hospital.

== Emigration to the U.S. ==
Forrester emigrated to the United States from Glasgow, sailing aboard the S.S. Columbia, and arrived in New York on 8 March 1920. In 1921 he took up an appointment as professional at Meadow Brook Golf Club, in Jericho, New York. Later he moved to Hollywood, New Jersey (1923–25); then to Baltusrol, New Jersey (1926–29); Oradell, New Jersey (1929); and Hackensack, New Jersey (1930–34).

== Golf career ==
Forrester qualified for the U.S. Open from 1921 to 1935 with his best finish being fourth place in 1923. He was a contestant in the 1921 PGA Championship, suffering a first round defeat against Walter Hagen. He did better in the 1923 PGA Championship when he won a first round match against Herbert Nicoll 6 and 4, but lost in the round of 32 against Jack Stait by the slim margin of 1 up. Also in 1923, Forrester came third in the New Jersey Open. He had great success in the years from 1926 through 1936 and won the Mid-South Open at Pinehurst, North Carolina, in 1928 and the New Jersey State Pro/Am on a number of occasions. Not unlike other professionals in his day, Forrester traveled south in the winter months to play in tournaments to stay sharp and earn money. He played events in Texas, Arkansas, Florida, North Carolina, and California.

=== 1923 U.S. Open ===
The 1923 U.S. Open was the 27th U.S. Open, held 13–15 July at Inwood Country Club in Inwood, New York, a suburb east of New York City. Bobby Jones, age 21, captured his first career major championship by defeating Bobby Cruickshank in an 18-hole Sunday playoff. Forrester played excellent golf himself and finished in fourth place, winning $200 in prize money. He carded rounds of 75-73-77-78=303 (+15) and finished one stroke behind third-place finisher Jock Hutchison.

== Death and legacy ==
Forrester died on 4 August 1964 in Chatham and is interred in Chatham cemetery. He was elected president of the New Jersey PGA (1933–35). From 1955 until his death, Forrester was the pro at Eastward Ho! Country Club in Chatham, Massachusetts, which reminded him of North Berwick in his birth country of Scotland.

== PGA Tour wins (2) ==
- 1928 Mid-South Open
- 1929 New Jersey PGA Championship

== Results in major championships ==
Tournament	1921	1922	1923	1924	1925	1926	1927	1928	1929	1930	1931	1932	1933	1934	1935	1936
U.S. Open	T57		4	36	T20	T13	T38	17	T23	T28	51		CUT	T35	CUT	
PGA Championship	R32		R32	R32												R64

Note: Forrester never played in the Masters Tournament or The Open Championship.

Top 10
Did not play

CUT = missed the half-way cut
"T" = tied for a place
R64, R32, R16, QF, SF = round in which player lost in PGA Championship match play
