= Lou Barbaro =

American professional golfer (1916–1976)

Louis Barbaro (July 3, 1916 – October 11, 1976) was a professional golfer and club pro.

Barbaro was born in Harrison, New York. His parents were immigrants from Barile, Italy, named Daniel "Donato" Barbaro and Carmella Teresa Paternoster Barbaro. He was one of seven sons. All of his six brothers enjoyed golfing.

Barbaro became the golf team captain for Harrison High School beginning in his sophomore year For three years following with Barbaro as their captain, Harrison High School's golf team remained undefeated. On July 25, 1933, Barbaro (age 17) became the Westchester County Caddie Golf Champion, turning in 150-total for 36 holes at the Green Meadows Golf Club in Harrison, New York.

Barbaro, at the age of 23 years, won the Providence Open (Providence, Rhode Island) on September 28, 1941, with a record 273, which was 15 under par and at least 6 shots or more ahead of Sammy Byrd, Sam Snead, Gene Sarazen, Toney Penna, Herman Barron, and Lawson Little. He gave the mere $1,200 Providence Open winnings to his younger brother, Tony to pay for medical school.

Barbaro became a pro at the Green Meadows course in Harrison, New York at the age of 19.

Only one year after becoming a member of the National Professional Golfers' Association, Barbaro beat the notoriously-tough Winged Foot Golf Club's (of Mamaroneck, New York) record scoring 69, 3 under par. He played the first eight holes in 35, four above the regulation. He had bogies on the 5th, 6th, 7th, and 8th holes, and was all for quitting. But, comes a 9th and a birdie, the 10th and a birdie, the 11th and a birdie, the 12th and another birdie, the 13th and a par, the 14th and an eagle, the 15th and a birdie, and the 16th still another birdie. To recapitulate, his score at Winged Foot was eight under par for eight consecutive holes, the 9th through the 16th. The 14th hole eagle was something in itself; it was a par four, 383-yarder. He smashed his tee shot straight down the middle and then holed a niblick from more than 100 yards out. In the newspaper article documenting this, they quoted "Gee whiz, he must have a magnet, or something." That day, Barbaro had four pars, seven birdies, one eagle, and six bogies; and the wind was blowing at a good clip (approximately 35 miles per hour) throughout the afternoon.

Barbaro married Gretchen Gabler at the First Baptist Church Of White Plains in White Plains, New York on February 9, 1946. They had three children, Stephen, Louis Jr., and Christine.

Although Barbaro was obviously talented at golfing, he put his family first and chose not to "hit-the-road" and tour too often, as he took his responsibilities as a husband and father more seriously than becoming "renowned" for his golfing.

On May 20, 1949, Barbaro and teammate Bobby Jacobson were co-winners of the New Jersey State Pro-Am match-play championship held at Plainfield Country Club, after having twice been runners-up in the event. In the 1950 tournament, held at Barbaro's Hollywood Golf Club in Deal, New Jersey, the pair were in a three-way tie for the championship. The duo won the tournament outright in 1951.

On October 10, 1952, Barbaro won the New Jersey PGA Championship.

Barbaro was a two-time winner of the New Jersey State Open, in 1953 and 1959. He won the Panama Open in 1942. In 1968, he was the winner of the National Quarter Century Tournament at the PGA Golf Course in Palm Beach Gardens, Florida.

Barbaro was enshrined in the New Jersey PGA Hall of Fame in Parsippany-Troy Hills Township, New Jersey on March 31, after he died.

Barbaro still holds the course record at both Beacon Hill and Jumping Brook.

A plaque hangs in Barbaro's honor on the door of the Hollywood Golf Club pro shop in Deal, New Jersey. The plaque has a picture of Barbaro and under it reads: "In Memory Of LOU BARBARO who, from 1947 until his untimely death in 1976 was our Devoted Friend and Golf Professional. His accomplishments on the golf course are noted in the Record Books. But Lou Barbaro was much more than a fine player and teaching professional. He was a walking advertisement for the game of golf and a credit to his profession. He taught us that "It's nice to be important; but it's more important to be nice." We will miss him always."

Barbaro was an Army Sergeant in World War II.

Barbaro was the past-president of the New Jersey Professional Golfers Association.

Barbaro died at the Paul Kimball Hospital in Lakewood, New Jersey on October 11, 1976, and was a resident of the Oakhurst neighborhood of Ocean Township, Monmouth County, New Jersey at the time of his death.

== Professional wins ==
this list may be incomplete

- 1941 Providence Open
- 1942 Panama Open
- 1952 New Jersey PGA Championship
- 1953 New Jersey State Open
- 1959 New Jersey State Open
