= 1926 Open Championship =

Coordinates: 53.7495°N 3.018°W

Tournament information
- Dates: 23–25 June 1926
- Location: Lytham & St Annes, England
- Course: Royal Lytham & St Annes Golf Club

Statistics
- Field: 117 players, 53 after cut
- Cut: 158
- Prize fund: £200
- Winner's share: (£75)

Champion
- (United States) Bobby Jones (a)
- 291

Location in England
Location in Lancashire. England

The 1926 Open Championship was the 61st Open Championship, held 23–25 June at Royal Lytham & St Annes Golf Club in Lytham St Annes, England. Amateur Bobby Jones won the first of his three Claret Jugs, two strokes ahead of runner-up Al Watrous. Jones was the first amateur to win the title in 29 years, last by Harold Hilton in 1897. Americans finished in the top four spots and it was the fifth victory by an American in six years.

This was the first Open Championship in which there was both qualifying and a 36-hole cut. A 36-hole cut had been introduced in 1898 to reduce numbers on the final day. However, with an ever increasing number of entries, in 1907 the cut was replaced with a qualification competition. This had continued until 1925, except in 1910–11 when there was again no qualification but a 36-hole cut. To make the cut players would need to be within 14 strokes of the leader after 36 holes. A new rule by The Royal and Ancient was also put into place in the 1926 Open Championship; it stated that no competitors would be allowed more than two practice rounds prior to the event. In the past some players had spent weeks on the championship course practicing. This new rule allowed the American players to compete on more equal terms with the British entrants.

This was also the first time there was regional qualifying. A southern section played at Sunningdale, a central section at St Annes Old Links and a northern section at Western Gailes. Each section played 36 holes, although for the southern and central sections this took place on two days (16–17 June) while for the northern section it was on just one day (16 June). 49 places (and ties) were allocated to the southern section, 42 places (and ties) to the central section and 10 places (and ties) to the northern section. 55 players qualified from the southern section, 51 from the central section and 11 from the northern section giving a total of 117. Tom Wilson won the northern section with a score of 148. In the southern section Bobby Jones dominated, scoring 134 (66-68), reportedly the lowest 36-hole score in any serious golf tournament up to that point, and leading by seven clear strokes. During the two rounds on only one hole did he score more than four, a five at the 10th in his second round. After his first round of 66, The Times reported that "the crowd dispersed awe-stricken. They had watched the best round they had ever seen, or ever would see, and what the later players did they neither knew nor cared". Walter Hagen led the central section with a score of 143, one of nine Americans qualifying there.

Hagen opened with 68 on Wednesday to take the lead, but a 77 in the second round dropped him back to third. In his second Open and already the winner of two U.S. Amateurs and a U.S. Open, Jones played steady golf and carded two rounds of 72 to co-lead with Bill Mehlhorn at the midway point. Hagen was a stroke back and one behind him were Watrous and Fred McLeod.

Jones had 73 in the third round on Friday morning, but Watrous shot 69 and took a two-stroke lead after 54 holes. In the final round that afternoon, Jones was still two behind Watrous with five holes to play. After picking up two strokes to forge a tie, Jones hit a wayward drive on 17 which appeared to swing the tournament back to Watrous. However, Jones hit a remarkable recovery shot from the sand dunes onto the green, closer to the hole than Watrous' approach from the fairway. Jones wound up taking the decisive lead in the tournament on this hole after Watrous three-putted. Jones played the tough final 5 holes in 4-3-4-4-4 to post 74 for 291, while Watrous struggled to 78 and 293. Hagen, playing behind Jones and Watrous, had a chance to tie by holing his second shot on the 18th, but his shot rolled past the hole and into a bunker and he settled for third place.

Jones, age 24, won his first Open Championship in just his second appearance. His first was five years earlier in 1921 and was less than pleasant: he walked off the Old Course at St Andrews in frustration after taking several shots to get out of a bunker. He went on to win two more Opens; his successful defense in 1927 was back at the Old Course, and his third in 1930 at Royal Liverpool was the second leg of his celebrated grand slam. Its first leg was the 1930 British Amateur, won three weeks earlier, Jones' win 96 years ago in 1930 is the last by an amateur.

For the first time, an admission fee was charged for spectators. Six-time champion Harry Vardon missed his first cut in the Open Championship at age 56; he had made the cut in every Open he played since 1893.

== Round summaries ==
=== First round ===
Wednesday, 23 June 1926

Place	Player	Score
1	(United States) Walter Hagen	68
2	(United States) Bill Mehlhorn	70
T3	(United States) Fred McLeod	71
T3	(United States) Al Watrous	71
5	(United States) Bobby Jones (a)	72
T6	(England) Reg Whitcombe	73
T6	(Scotland) Tom Wilson	73
T8	(United States) Tommy Armour	74
T8	(England) Harry Walker	74
T10	(England) Syd Ball	75
T10	(England) Fred Bradbeer	75
T10	(Scotland) George Duncan	75
T10	(England) Arthur Havers	75
T10	(Scotland) Jimmy McDowall	75
T10	(England) J.H. Taylor	75
T10	(United States) George Von Elm (a)	75

=== Second round ===
Thursday, 24 June 1926

Place	Player	Score
T1	(United States) Bobby Jones (a)	72-72=144
T1	(United States) Bill Mehlhorn	70-74=144
3	(United States) Walter Hagen	68-77=145
T4	(United States) Fred McLeod	71-75=146
T4	(United States) Al Watrous	71-75=146
6	(United States) George Von Elm (a)	75-72=147
T7	(United States) Tommy Armour	74-76=150
T7	(England) Tom Barber	77-73=150
T7	(England) Archie Compston	76-74=150
T7	(United States) Cyril Walker	79-71=150

=== Third round ===
Friday, 25 June 1926 (morning)

Place	Player	Score
1	(United States) Al Watrous	71-75-69=215
2	(United States) Bobby Jones (a)	72-72-73=217
3	(United States) Walter Hagen	68-77-74=219
4	(United States) Fred McLeod	71-75-76=222
T5	(United States) Bill Mehlhorn	70-74-79=223
T5	(United States) George Von Elm (a)	75-72-76=223
7	(England) J.H. Taylor	75-78-71=224
T8	(United States) Tommy Armour	74-76-75=225
T8	(United States) Emmet French	76-75-74=225
T10	(Jersey) Herbert Gaudin	78-78-71=227
T10	(Argentina) José Jurado	77-76-74=227

=== Final round ===
Friday, 25 June 1926 (afternoon)

Place	Player	Score	Money (£)
1	(United States) Bobby Jones (a)	72-72-73-74=291	0
2	(United States) Al Watrous	71-75-69-78=293	75
T3	(United States) Walter Hagen	68-77-74-76=295	40
T3	(United States) George Von Elm (a)	75-72-76-72=295	0
T5	(England) Tom Barber	77-73-78-71=299	20
T5	(England) Abe Mitchell	78-78-72-71=299	20
7	(United States) Fred McLeod	71-75-76-79=301	10
T8	(United States) Emmet French	76-75-74-78=303	8; 6s 8d
T8	(Argentina) José Jurado	77-76-74-76=303	8; 6s 8d
T8	(United States) Bill Mehlhorn	70-74-79-80=303	8; 6s 8d

Amateurs: Jones (291), Von Elm (295), L. Hartley (306)
