= Jack Kiefer =

Jack Kiefer may refer to:

- Jack Kiefer (golfer)
- Jack Kiefer (statistician)
