= Herbert Strong (golfer) =

English professional golfer (1880–1944)

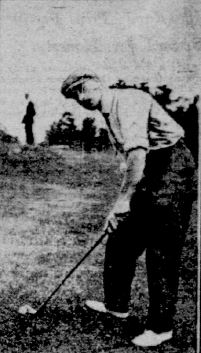
- Herbert Strong, c. 1924

Personal information
- Full name: Herbert Bertram Strong
- Nationality: England
- Born: 13 February 1880 Ramsgate, Kent, England
- Died: 8 October 1944 (aged 64) Fort Pierce, Florida, U.S.
- Height: 5 ft 6 in (1.68 m)
- Weight: 140 lb (64 kg; 10 st)
- Spouses: Clara Maude Overy; Ann Carolyn Jordan
- Children: 5

Career
- Sport: Golf
- Turned professional: 1902

Best results in major championships
- Masters Tournament: DNP
- PGA Championship: DNP
- U.S. Open: 9th: 1913
- The Open Championship: CUT: 1899, 1903, 1904

Herbert Bertram Strong (13 February 1880 – 8 October 1944) was an English professional golfer. He was an organizer and founding member of the PGA of America and later became a successful golf course architect. As a player, Strong's best finish in a major championship was ninth place in the 1913 U.S. Open.

== Early life ==
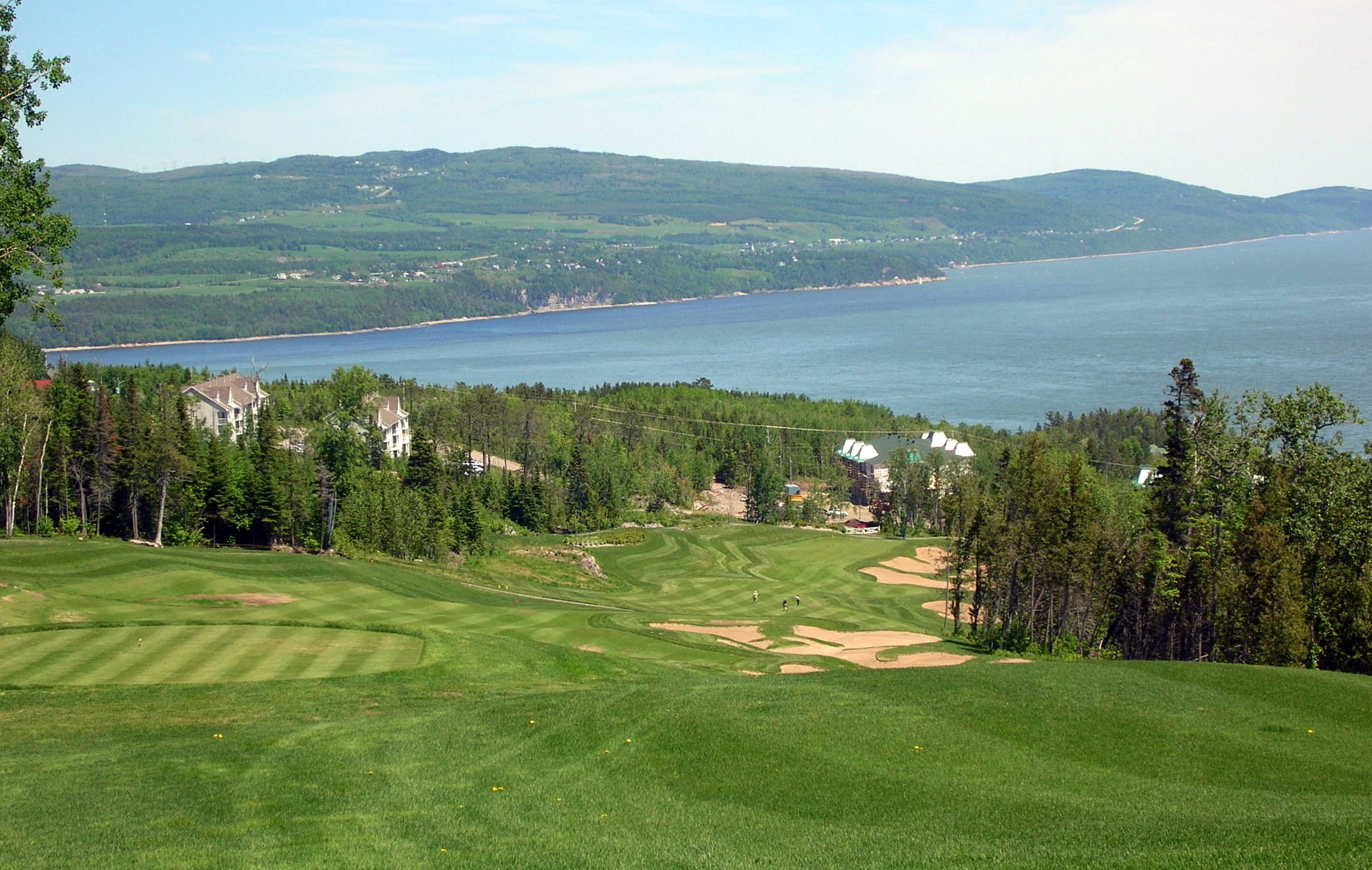
Fairmont Le Manoir Richelieu golf course in Charlevoix, Quebec

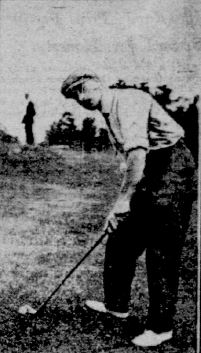
Strong preparing to hit a chip shot in 1908

Strong with his driver, c. 1909

Strong was born on 13 February 1880 in Ramsgate, Kent, England, to William R. Strong (1846–1899) and Charlotte E. Strong née Stock (1850–1923).

Strong was introduced to golf in the mid-1890s through his participation as a caddie at Royal St George's Golf Club in Sandwich, England. In 1905, he emigrated to the United States, departing Liverpool on 14 June 1905 aboard the RMS Teutonic and arriving in New York City on 22 June 1905 with $400 in his pocket, a hefty sum at the time.

== Professional career ==
=== Early career ===
Strong competed in the 1899 Open Championship at Royal St George's Golf Club located in Sandwich, England. He played as an amateur, scored 89 and 90 and missed the cut by 8 strokes. By 1902 he had become the professional at the Gog Magog Golf Club near Cambridge. In a friendly match against Tom Vardon at Sandwich on 27 May 1903, Strong made a hole-in-one (likely wind assisted) on a par 4 hole. He entered the 1903 Open Championship held at Prestwick Golf Club, South Ayrshire, Scotland, but failed to advance past the half-way cut. In the 1904 Open Championship, again held on his home course at Sandwich, Strong opened with a first round 93—in windy and cold conditions—but could only improve to 88 in round two when the weather improved. He ended up missing the cut, by 13 strokes, which came at 168.

In 1905, he emigrated to the United States and became the professional at The Apawamis Club in Rye, New York, a course featuring pronounced land forms and blind shots. When you combine this with his time spent at Royal St George's, the course nearest his home where he learned to play golf, you start to see a lot of his architectural influence. In 1911, he moved to Inwood Country Club and remodeled the course over several years eventually leading to the course hosting the 1921 PGA Championship and the 1923 U.S. Open. On 16 September 1905 Strong partnered with 18-year-old Jerome Travers to tie for second place, shooting 72, in a four-ball tournament—part of the 1905 Metropolitan Open—that was held at Fox Hills Golf Club on Staten Island.

=== PGA Officer ===
Rodman Wanamaker, the wealthy proprietor of the Wanamaker department stores (now Macy's), and a number of golf professionals—including the legendary Walter Hagen and leading amateurs of the era—gathered at Wanamaker's invitation for a luncheon at the Taplow Club in the Martinique Hotel on Broadway and West 32nd Street in New York City on 17 January 1916. Wanamaker believed golf professionals could enhance equipment sales if they formed an association. It was during this meeting that Strong, James Hepburn, Jack Hobens, Jack Mackie, James Maiden, Gilbert Nicholls and Robert White were chosen as the organizing committee of the PGA of America. Later in 1916, Strong was appointed as the first Secretary-Treasurer.

The Taplow Club gathering initiated a series of several meetings over the next several months and, on 10 April 1916, the PGA of America was officially established with 35 charter members. Wanamaker proposed that the newly formed organization hold an annual tournament, and offered to donate money for a trophy and prize fund. That October, the first annual PGA Championship took place at the Siwanoy Country Club in Bronxville, New York. James M. Barnes defeated Jock Hutchison in the championship match, taking home the Wanamaker Trophy and $2,580 as his share of the purse.

=== Golf course architect ===
List of golf courses designed by Strong

- Aviation Country Club – Private in Detroit, Michigan
- The Woodmere Club – Private in Woodmere, New York
- Brooklake Country Club – Private in Florham Park, New Jersey
- Canterbury Golf Club – Private in Beachwood, Ohio
  (Canterbury has hosted all five of the men's rotating major championships)
- Country Club of Maryland – Private in Towson, Maryland
- Engineers Country Club – Private in Roslyn Harbor, New York
- Guyan Golf & Country Club – Private in Huntington, West Virginia
- Indian Hills Country Club – Semi-Private in Fort Pierce, Florida
- Inner Nine at Army Navy Country Club – Private in Arlington, Virginia
- Island Hills Golf Club – Private in Sayville, New York
- Northeast Harbor Golf Club – Semi-Private in Northeast Harbor, Maine
- Pinecrest Golf Club – Semi-Private in Largo, Florida
- Metropolis Country Club – Private in White Plains, New York
- Rock Ridge Golf Course - Hackettstown, New Jersey
  (previously named the Musconetcong Country Club, Hidden Hills Golf Club and Minebrook Golf Club. Herbert Strong designed the first 9 holes)
- Varadero Golf Club – Public in Matanzas, Cuba
- Island's End Golf & Country Club – Semi-Private in Greenport, New York
- Lake Forest Country Club – Private in Hudson, Ohio
- Linwood Country Club – Private in Linwood, New Jersey
- Ponte Vedra Inn and Club, Ocean Course – Semi-Private in Ponte Vedra Beach, Florida
  (site of the 1934 Florida State Amateur and the 1938 Southern Amateur)
- Saucon Valley Country Club, Old Course – Private in Bethlehem, Pennsylvania
  (site of the 2009 U.S. Women's Open, 1992 U.S. Senior Open,
  2000 U.S. Senior Open, 2022 U.S. Senior Open, 1951 U.S. Amateur, 1983 U.S. Junior Amateur, 2014 U.S. Mid-Amateur)
- Riomar Country Club – Private in Vero Beach, Florida
- Clearwater Country Club – Private in Clearwater, Florida
- Sherwood Forest Golf Course – Private in Sherwood Forest, Maryland
- St. Petersburg Country Club – Private in St. Petersburg, Florida
- Vero Beach Country Club – Private in Vero Beach, Florida
- Woodholme Country Club – Private in Pikesville, Maryland
- Lakeview Golf Course – Public in Mississauga, Ontario, Canada
  (site of the 1923 and 1934 Canadian Open)
- Fairmont Le Manoir Richelieu Golf Club – Private in Charlevoix, Quebec, Canada
- Inwood Country Club – Private in Inwood, New York
  (site of the 1923 U.S. Open and 1921 PGA Championship)
- Knickerbocker Country Club – Private in Tenafly, New Jersey
  (Donald Ross design, with subsequent input from Herbert Strong)
- Nassau Country Club – Private in Glen Cove, New York

Engineers Country Club was founded in 1917 by a group of engineers from Manhattan. The club features a bold course with titanic undulating green complexes and wide hole corridors built on terrain that at times slashes upward or cascades sharply downward to greens protected by dramatic bunkers. Within those features are subtle touches that only those familiar with the course recognize: the well-placed roll in the fairway or the slight green contouring that sends putts in directions that seemingly defy the law of gravity.

Strong was able to complete construction of the golf course in only 27 months. Devereux Emmet remodeled part of the course in 1921. The course hosted the 1919 PGA Championship and the 1920 U.S. Amateur. A sports writer of the time wrote in August 1920: "No young club in the history of golf, let it go back 400 years, has come in for as much discussion and comment as Engineers. The main nerve test will be on the greens. You will find strong men weeping as they finish a round". Some critics of Strong's design work on Engineers described it as "a bag of tricks".

Strong's architectural work was to be commended as praise worthy for its originality. He excelled in making his golf courses stand out with interesting features such as multi-tiered greens and deep, cavernous bunkers. Strong managed to advance his art form to a higher level not always approached by other architects. Asked to articulate his philosophy of golf course design, Strong said, "the duty of the golf architect is to build natural beauty into every possible feature of play." He believed in the need for good shot-making and felt that a player should pay a high price for a poorly executed shot—occasionally with very dire results. His greens were what set him apart and often set more of the strategy than the equally daunting bunkers. He designed boldly contoured greens that required careful approach, from the ideal side of the fairway, to avoid running through the green and into trouble beyond. Strong is credited with designing the first island green in the United States. Strong designed this oft-copied challenge—the dreaded 9th hole—in 1928 on the Ocean Course at Ponte Vedra Inn and Club. The course was scheduled to host the 1939 Ryder Cup matches if World War II had not intervened. The island itself, lying 157 yards from the tee, is edged by palm trees and peppered with bunkers; the hole seldom plays easy due to stiff ocean breezes. The Ocean Course was redesigned by Robert Trent Jones Sr. in 1947, then again by Bobby Weed in 1998. The 1947 redesign by Jones was an attempt to reduce some of the severity of Strong's design features.

"Build natural beauty into every possible feature of play".

— Strong on his architectural philosophy

At Engineers Country Club, Strong's routing approached the hills from every conceivable angle making a full and varied use of the available topography. He designed holes that played straight up the hill, had holes traversing along the crests with second shots to green sites placed below, and even from one hill to the next. He brought you in at an angle and off the top of hills and slopes depending on what topography he could take advantage of. His course design skills were even more impressive at Fairmont Le Manoir Richelieu where he managed to build a great course on a very severe piece of topography with 400 feet of elevation change. The newspaper columnist and Bobby Jones biographer O. B. Keeler wrote, "so excellent an authority as Walter Travis, the grand old man of American golf, was heard to state rather freely that several of the holes [at Engineers Country Club] were too severe".

If there is any criticism of Strong's golf course architecture it would likely be due to the severity of his design of greens and their ability to repel poor shots, and even good shots if they hit the green at the wrong speed or angle. His green designs often incorporated two tiers and sometimes featured a crowned central area, in the manner of fellow golf course architect Donald Ross, that rewarded only the finest of shots; poor shots would drift off the back and to the sides of greens, and greens incorporating false fronts would agonize players whose shots were short and not reaching the central plateau of the green. Most players of his era—playing with wood-shafted clubs—struggled with the boldness, originality and aggressiveness of the architectural forms that he used. The original Fairmont Le Manoir Richelieu course in Quebec, Canada, is full of fascinating holes that traverse an extremely hilly and severe property.

Strong was known for designing golf holes on steep and difficult terrain. He built some distinctive holes that often received both praise and also criticism for their unusual designs. His courses mainly featured sloped greens, which were a primary way he added difficulty to a hole.

=== 1913 U.S. Open ===
The 1913 U.S. Open was the 19th U.S. Open, held 18–20 September, at The Country Club in Brookline, Massachusetts, a suburb southwest of Boston. Amateur Francis Ouimet, age 20, won his only U.S. Open title in an 18-hole playoff, five strokes ahead of British stars Harry Vardon and Ted Ray.

Strong was in contention to win after two rounds of play and was referred to in the Aberdeen Journal as "the sometime Sandwich caddie". An article in the Indianapolis Star, published on 19 September 1913, referred to Strong as "a dark horse of the first magnitude" after he scored surprisingly well in rounds one and two, playing alone and without a partner. Due to an uneven number of players in the field, Strong ended up playing all four rounds alone, with only a scoring official accompanying him on the course. Strong's game was enhanced by his masterful ability to hit the short approach shot. His weakness, at times, was erratic putting. Despite his small physique—he weighed only 140 pounds—he was described as a long hitter of the ball and he insisted that his size was not a handicap.

The first two rounds were played Thursday and the final two rounds on Friday. Strong's fine results in the first two rounds put him on 149, tied for second place with Ray, two strokes behind the second round leader, Vardon, who stood at 147. Strong's play was remarkable for its steadiness, rather than any particular brilliancy, as he methodically hit fairways and greens and seldom found himself in trouble. Strong beat or tied eventual winner Francis Ouimet in rounds 1, 2 and 4. A disappointing third round 82, however, ruined any chance he had to win the tournament and he would eventually finish on 310, +18 to par, for a ninth-place finish. He won $40 as his share of the purse.

== Personal life ==
Strong fathered five children, three with his first wife Clara Maude Overy (1881–1954):

Irene Maude Strong (1900–1992)
Herbert Strong (1902–1930)
Enid Vera Strong (1905–1914)

After enduring a divorce—and the early death of two of his children—he remarried in 1942 to Ann Carolyn Jordan (1922–2004), a woman 42 years his junior. His first wife, Clara, returned with her only surviving child to live in England. His second marriage to Ann Jordan yielded one son and a daughter:

Herbert "Sonny" Strong (1942–2015)
Molly Strong (1943–2006)

== Death and legacy ==
Strong died at age 64 of a heart attack in Fort Pierce, Florida, on 8 October 1944. He is best remembered as a prolific golf course architect in the early 20th century. Strong apparently never applied for American citizenship; the 1940 U.S. census listed him as a resident alien as of that date.

== Results in major championship ==
Tournament	1899	1900	1901	1902	1903	1904	1905	1906	1907	1908	1909	1910	1911	1912	1913	1914	1915	1916
U.S. Open							T46	CUT	T38	T29	T38	DNQ		CUT	9	CUT	T26	T36
The Open Championship	CUT				CUT	CUT											NT	NT

Note: Strong never played in the Masters Tournament or the PGA Championship.

Top 10
Did not play

NT = no tournament
CUT = missed the half-way cut
"T" indicates a tie for a place

== See also ==
- List of golf course architects
