= Brian Gaffney =

American professional golfer (born 1970)

Personal information
- Nationality: United States
- Born: October 3, 1970 (age 56) Summit, New Jersey, U.S.
- Height: 5 ft 11 in (1.80 m)
- Weight: 135 lb (61 kg; 9.6 st)

Career
- Sport: Golf
- Turned professional: 1994
- Professional wins: 13

Best results in major championships
- Masters Tournament: DNP
- PGA Championship: 71st: 2015
- U.S. Open: CUT: 2012
- The Open Championship: DNP

Brian Gaffney (born October 3, 1970) is an American professional golfer.

Gaffney made the cut at the 2015 PGA Championship. He was the only club pro to make the cut and the first since 2011.

Gaffney was the head professional at Quaker Ridge Golf Club in Scarsdale, New York. He is currently the head professional at Essex Fells Country Club in Essex Fells, New Jersey.

== Professional wins ==
- 2001 South Florida PGA Championship
- 2002 The Clambake at Rockaway River
- 2004 PGA Winter Stroke Play Championship
- 2005 New Jersey PGA Match Play Championship
- 2008 Charity Classic
- 2010 New Jersey State Open, The Clambake at Rockaway River
- 2011 New Jersey PGA Match Play Championship
- 2012 New Jersey PGA Championship, Charity Classic
- 2013 New Jersey PGA Match Play Championship
- 2015 Metropolitan PGA Team Championship
- 2023 New Jersey PGA Championship

== Results in major championships ==
Tournament	2000	2001	2002	2003	2004	2005	2006	2007	2008	2009	2010	2011	2012	2013	2014	2015	2016
U.S. Open													CUT				
PGA Championship	CUT									CUT			CUT			71	CUT

Note: Gaffney never played in the Masters Tournament nor The Open Championship.

Did not play

CUT = missed the half-way cut

== U.S. national team appearances ==
- PGA Cup: 2000 (winners)
