= John Buczek =

American professional golfer

John Henry Buczek (born 1943/1944) is an American professional golfer.

== Amateur career ==
Buczek attended Wake Forest University, majored in business, and graduated in 1967. Buczek played for Wake Forest's legendary golf team. They won the first of 10 straight ACC Championships in Buczek's senior year.

== Professional career ==
Buczek was the first American to win on the Southern Africa Tour. He won the 1972 Holiday Inns Open held in Mbabane, Swaziland. Buczek started the final round tied with England's Peter Oosterhuis. Buczek shot a final round 67 to win by one over defending champion Cobie Legrange. He outplayed Oosterhuis, then regarded as one of the world's best players, by five shots.

At the 1974 U.S. Open at Winged Foot Golf Club, Buzcek was in the top 10 for the first two rounds. He shot 83-73 over the weekend and finished T35. He would work as Winged Foot's sixth head professional, much later in his career, from 2006 to 2009.

Buczek was also Director of Instruction at Wake Forest Golf Academy. In 2018, Buczek was recognized as one of the six head professionals who served throughout the 50-year history of Grandfather Golf & Country Club in Linville, North Carolina.

== Professional wins (4) ==
=== Southern Africa Tour wins (1) ===
| No. | Date | Tournament | Winning score | Margin of victory | Runner-up |
|---|---|---|---|---|---|
| 1 | 19 Feb 1972 | Holiday Inns Open | −18 (65-69-69-67=270) | 1 stroke | (South Africa) Cobie Legrange |

=== Other wins (3) ===
- 1970 Westchester Open
- 1973 New Jersey PGA Championship
- 1974 New Jersey State Open
