= Gene Kunes =

American professional golfer (1908–1965)

Personal information
- Full name: Eugene Laverne Kunes
- Nationality: United States
- Born: November 22, 1908 Erie, Pennsylvania, U.S.
- Died: May 17, 1965 (aged 56) East Cleveland, Ohio, U.S.

Career
- Sport: Golf
- Status: Professional
- Former tour: PGA Tour
- Professional wins: 12

Number of wins by tour
- PGA Tour: 2
- Other: 10

Best results in major championships
- Masters Tournament: T10: 1942
- PGA Championship: T3: 1934
- U.S. Open: T16: 1940
- The Open Championship: DNP

Eugene Laverne Kunes (November 22, 1908 – May 17, 1965) was an American professional golfer.

== Career ==
Kunes was born in Erie, Pennsylvania.

He made his living as a club professional while occasionally playing on the early PGA Tour. He did win twice on Tour, including the 1935 Canadian Open.

== Professional wins (12) ==
=== PGA Tour wins (2) ===
- 1933 Connecticut PGA Championship
- 1935 Canadian Open

=== Other wins (10) ===
this list may be incomplete

- 1931 Connecticut PGA Championship
- 1934 Philadelphia PGA Championship, East Falls Open
- 1935 Mid-South Pro-Pro Bestball (with Dick Metz)
- 1941 Pennsylvania Open Championship
- 1942 Philadelphia PGA Championship
- 1947 Massachusetts Open, New Jersey State Open, New Jersey PGA Championship, Philadelphia Open Championship

== Results in major championships ==
| Tournament | 1932 | 1933 | 1934 | 1935 | 1936 | 1937 | 1938 | 1939 |
|---|---|---|---|---|---|---|---|---|
| Masters Tournament | NYF | NYF | T38 | T28 | T39 | | | |
| U.S. Open | | | CUT | T21 | T50 | | | T42 |
| PGA Championship | R16 | | SF | R64 | | | | |

| Tournament | 1940 | 1941 | 1942 | 1943 | 1944 | 1945 | 1946 | 1947 | 1948 | 1949 |
|---|---|---|---|---|---|---|---|---|---|---|
| Masters Tournament | | T19 | T10 | NT | NT | NT | T29 | T39 | WD | |
| U.S. Open | T16 | 20 | NT | NT | NT | NT | T19 | T19 | | |
| PGA Championship | | R32 | | NT | R32 | | | | | |

| Tournament | 1950 | 1951 |
|---|---|---|
| Masters Tournament | | |
| U.S. Open | | T42 |
| PGA Championship | R64 | R16 |

Note: Kunes never played in The Open Championship.

Top 10
Did not play

NYF = tournament not yet founded
NT = no tournament
CUT = missed the half-way cut
WD = withdrew
R64, R32, R16, QF, SF = round in which player lost in PGA Championship match play
"T" indicates a tie for a place

=== Summary ===
| Tournament | Wins | 2nd | 3rd | Top-5 | Top-10 | Top-25 | Events | Cuts made |
|---|---|---|---|---|---|---|---|---|
| Masters Tournament | 0 | 0 | 0 | 0 | 1 | 2 | 8 | 7 |
| U.S. Open | 0 | 0 | 0 | 0 | 0 | 5 | 9 | 8 |
| The Open Championship | 0 | 0 | 0 | 0 | 0 | 0 | 0 | 0 |
| PGA Championship | 0 | 0 | 1 | 1 | 3 | 5 | 7 | 7 |
| Totals | 0 | 0 | 1 | 1 | 4 | 12 | 24 | 22 |

- Most consecutive cuts made – 17 (1934 PGA – 1947 U.S. Open)
- Longest streak of top-10s – 1 (four times)
