= Connecticut PGA Championship =

American golf tournament

The Connecticut PGA Championship is a golf tournament that is a championship of the Connecticut section of the PGA of America. The early years of the tournament were dominated by Gene Kunes and Joe Turnesa who won twice apiece. In the mid-1930s, a number of significant changes were made, including adding two rounds to the tournament and then changing the format to match play. In the mid-20th century the tournament was dominated by Eddie Burke and Bob Kay. During this era, both won the tournament five times each though Kay defeated Burke in both of their finals matches. In modern times, the tournament is best known for the 2002 victory of Suzy Whaley, the only female to win the event.

== History ==
The first tournament was in 1929. Late in the day, the clubhouse leaders entered a playoff to determine the championship. Unbeknownst to them, Maurice Kearney was still on the course with a chance to win. While he was on the 18th hole, he notified the players in the playoff, who were playing on the first hole, that he had a chance to win outright. Kearney did indeed win outright and "the playoff" was terminated. The following year George Siebert won the event defeating Peter Manning, who was also runner-up the previous year, in a playoff.

In the early 1930s, the tournament was dominated by Gene Kunes and Joe Turnesa. Kunes won the tournament in 1931 and 1933. In 1935, Turnesa was the "leader most of the way" and ultimately won by five shots. His final total was 145, one-under-par, to break the tournament record. The following year, as defending champion, he was considered to be the favorite. However, it was Willie Hunter who took the lead after the first three rounds. He led by four over Turnesa entering the final round. However, in the final round Turnesa birdied the first two holes and the tournament suddenly "cracked wide open" when Hunter triple-bogeyed the par-5 5th hole. Hunter continued to struggle and Turnesa expanded his lead. Despite bogeys on the final four holes Turnesa won easily.

It was later decided that the tournament would be moved up a couple months earlier, in August. In April 1936, the Connecticut Section PGA made a number of changes. The "most important decision," according to The Hartford Courant, was to extend the Connecticut PGA Championship to 72 holes. The following year, in 1937, the tournament took a "radical departure" and changed its format to match play. In May 1941, however, the Connecticut PGA decided to return to a medal play format.

In the late 1940s, the tournament was dominated by Eddie Burke and Harry Nettelbladt. Burke won the tournament in 1945 and 1946. In 1947, Harry Nettelbladt scored rounds of 73 and 71 to win. The following year, Burke led the qualifiers while Nettelbladt finished second. Both players made it to the finals. In the morning round of the finals, Burke "coasted" with a 71 (−2) to take a 5 up lead. During the afternoon round, however, Nettelbladt produced a "sensational performance," ultimately scoring a 65 (−8) and tying the match. After halving the first extra hole, however, Nettelbladt took four shots to reach the green of the par-4 38th hole. He made bogey to lose to Burke. Two years later, in the finals, Burke "set an all time record" defeating Frank Staszowski 12 & 11.

In the 1950s, the tournament was dominated by Bob Kay, a professional at Wampanoag Country Club. In 1953, he made it to the finals. Kay took a 5 up lead in the morning round however Burke tied him during the afternoon's back nine. Kay, however, won the 15th and 16th holes to secure the match and championship. He won 2 & 1. Kay won the tournament again in 1956 and 1959. In 1960, Kay qualified for the finals but was expected "to face tough going" against Eddie Burke. It was the second time they met in the finals, the first in seven years. Both were intending to win their fourth title. Kay "got off to a strong start" and took a 6 up lead after only 8 holes. Over the course of the rest of the match, however, Burke "slowly but surely whittled Kay's lead down." Entering the final hole of regulation, he was only 1 down. However, Burke failed to make the green in regulation and conceded the hole. Kay won 1 up.

In the early 1960s, there were some changes. In 1961, the tournament returned to medal play. The following year the tournament returned to Connecticut after having been held in Massachusetts the previous year.

Some controversy exists regarding the winner of the 2002 Championship, Suzy Whaley. By winning the Connecticut PGA that year, she became the first woman in 58 years to qualify for a PGA event, the Greater Hartford Open. The controversy had to do with the fact that she was allowed to play the course off tees 699 yards shorter than the men she competed against. This discrepancy has since been addressed by the PGA with what's commonly called the "Whaley Rule".

== Winners ==
Year	Winner	Score	To par	Margin of victory	Runner(s)-up	Venue	Ref.
2026	Christopher Tallman	145	+3	4 strokes	Brian Keiser	Black Hall Club	
2025	Kyle Gallo	142	−2	2 strokes	Christopher Tallman	Wampanoag Country Club	
2024	Adam Rainaud	140	−2	2 strokes	Terry Slater	Black Hall Club	
2023	Andrew Svoboda	137	−5	3 strokes	Corey Harris	CC of Farmington	
2022	Geoff Gelderman	146	+4	Playoff	Adam D'Amario	Black Hall Club	
2021	Brian Keiser	143	−1	2 strokes	William Street	Wampanoag Country Club	
2020	Brian Keiser	140	E	1 stroke	Christopher Tallman	Wintonbury Hills Golf Club	
2019	Christopher Tallman	133	−7	7 strokes	Frank Leja, Joe Mentz, Zac Stennett, William Street, Aaron Ungvarsky	Keney Park Golf Club	
2018	Adam Rainaud	132	−8	3 strokes	Marc Bayram	Keney Park Golf Club	
2017	Kyle Bilodeau	133	−7	2 strokes	Billy Downes	Keney Park Golf Club	
2016	Adam Rainaud	135	−5	2 strokes	Fran Marello	Keney Park Golf Club	
2015	Kevin Giancola	211	−2	1 stroke	Adam Rainaud	Wethersfield Country Club	
2014	Adam Rainaud	135	−7	3 strokes	Fran Marello	Orchards Golf Club	
2013	Kyle Bilodeau	142	−2	2 strokes	Billy Downes	Mohegan Sun Golf Course	
2012	Tony Kelley	214		Playoff (Note: Kelly won in a sudden-death playoff.)	Kyle Bilodeau	Ellington Ridge Country Club	
2011	Kevin Giancola	221		Playoff (Note: Giancola won in a sudden-death playoff.)	Tony Kelley, Fran Marrello	Black Hall Club	
2010	Kevin Giancola	209			Frank Leja Jr	Lyman Orchards Golf Club - RTJ	
2009	Fran Marrello	208		4 strokes	Tony Kelley, Bob Kay	Wethersfield Country Club	
2008	Kevin Giancola	207		2 strokes	Tony Kelley	Wampanoag Country Club	
2007	Ian Marshall	216		3 strokes	Jack McConachie	Ellington Ridge Country Club	
2006	Jim St. Pierre	207		9 strokes	Kevin Giancola	Longmeadow Country Club	
2005	Mike Carney	213		3 strokes	David Dell	Race Brook Country Club	
2004	Tom Gleeton	208		Playoff (Note: Gleeton won in a sudden-death playoff.)	Tim Gavronski, Kevin Giancola, Tony Kelley	Country Club of Waterbury	
2003	Kevin Giancola	211		Playoff (Note: Giancola won in a sudden-death playoff.)	Fred Kolakowski, Wayne Leal	New Haven Country Club	
2002	Suzy Whaley	211		2 strokes	Bob Mucha	Ellington Ridge Country Club	
2001	Fran Marrello	215		2 strokes	John Paesani	Black Hall Club	
2000	Tony Kelley	211		2 strokes	John Paesani	Hartford Golf Club	
1999	Bill Mackedon	213		1 stroke	Tom Gleeton	Wethersfield Country Club	
1998	Mike Martin	215		Playoff (Note: Martin won in a sudden-death playoff.)	Joe Cordani	Wampanoag Country Club	
1997	John Paesani	216		1 stroke	Mike Carney, Tony Kelley	Ellington Ridge Country Club	
1996	Tony Kelley	217		Playoff (Note: Kelley won in a sudden-death playoff.)	Fran Marrello	Ellington Ridge Country Club	
1995	Allan Menne	215		4 strokes	John Paesani, Dave Cook, Mike Carney	Ellington Ridge Country Club	
1994	Dennis Coscina	218		Playoff (Note: Coscina won in a sudden-death playoff.)	Fran Marrello	Ellington Ridge Country Club	
1993	John Paesani	209		4 strokes	Dennis Coscina	Ellington Ridge Country Club	
1992	Stan McLennan	218		5 strokes	Mike Carney, Fred Kolakowski, John Paesani	Ellington Ridge Country Club	
1991	John Paesani	219		1 stroke	Larry Demers, Allan Menne	Ellington Ridge Country Club	
1990	Kris Smith	217		1 stroke	Tony Kelley	Ellington Ridge Country Club	
1989	Tony Kelley	218		2 strokes	John Paesani	Ellington Ridge Country Club	
1988	Tony Kelley	147		1 stroke	Mike Bailey	Ellington Ridge Country Club	
1987	Doug Dalziel	214		Playoff (Note: Dalziel won in a sudden-death playoff.)	Paul Ryiz	Ellington Ridge Country Club	
1986	Doug Dalziel	215		1 stroke	Mike Grigely	Richter Park Golf Course	
1985	Dennis Coscina	213		6 strokes	Paul Ryiz	TPC at Connecticut	
1984	Donald Hoenig	218		3 strokes	Paul Ryiz, Ralph DeNicolo	Manchester Country Club	
1983	Dennis Coscina	216		5 strokes	Doug Dalziel	Woodbridge Country Club	
1982	Jack McConachie	215		Playoff (Note: McConachie won in a sudden-death playoff.)	Ed Rubis	The Golf Club of Avon	
1981	Doug Dalziel	211		7 strokes	Dan DiRico	The Farms Country Club	
1980	Dennis Coscina	207		3 strokes	Chuck Lasher	Cliffside Country Club	
1979	Dennis Coscina	139		2 strokes	Jack McConachie	Ellington Ridge Country Club	
1978	Dennis Coscina	216		3 strokes	John Cowan	Hop Meadow Country Club	
1977	Bob Kay	219		1 stroke	Ray Howell	Brooklawn Country Club	
1976	Dennis Coscina	212		7 strokes	Don Parson	Tumble Brook Country Club	
1975	Dennis Coscina	213		6 strokes	Don Hoenig	Hartford Golf Club	
1974	Ed Rubis	218			Dick Stranahan	Black Hall Club	
1973	Al Fuchs	216		2 strokes	Dick Stranahan	Wallingford Country Club	
1972	Ed Rubis	220		1 stroke	Ray Howell, Dennis Coscina, Frank Guerrara, Chuck Lasher, Tony Clecak	Ellington Ridge Country Club	
1971	Dick Stranahan	213		3 strokes	Ed Rubis	Country Club of Fairfield	
1970	Ray Howell	209		4 strokes	Dick Stranahan	Longmeadow Country Club	
1969	Don Headings	215		1 stroke	Dick Stranahan	Brooklawn Country Club	
1968	Stan Stanszowski	213			Dick Stranahan	The Orchards Golf Club	
1967	Dick Stranahan	214		5 strokes	Chet Wojack	Ellington Ridge Country Club	
1966	John McGoldrick	214		3 strokes	Wally Cichon, Billy Salvatore	Brooklawn Country Club	
1965	Ed Rubis	219		3 strokes	Larry McCue, Al Labutis	Oak Lane Country Club	
1964	Ed Rubis	220		1 stroke	Larry McCue	Hop Meadow Country Club	
1963	Bob Kay	211		6 strokes	Eddie Kuna	Wampanoag Country Club	
1962	Roger Horton	216		4 strokes	Ed Rubis	Ellington Ridge Country Club	
1961	Ed Rubis	219		4 strokes	Harry Nettelbladt, Frank Staszowski	Crestview Country Club	
1960	Bob Kay	1 up			Eddie Burke	Torrington Country Club	
1959	Bob Kay	4 & 3			Leo Chizinski	Torrington Country Club	
1958	Al Labutis	3 & 1			Bob Schappa	The Country Club	
1957	Bob Bodington	10 & 9			John Galeski	The Country Club	
1956	Bob Kay	5 & 4			Al Lubutis	Shennecossett Golf Course	
1955	Vic Panciera	3 & 2			Willie Hunter	Shennecossett Golf Course	
1954	Harry Nettebladt	4 & 3			Willie Whalen	Norwich Golf Club	
1953	Bob Kay	2 & 1			Eddie Burke	Indian Hill Country Club	
1952	Frank Kringle	4 & 2			Harry Bontempo	Norwich Golf Club	
1951	George Buck	4 & 3			Wally Cichon	Norwich Golf Club	
1950	Eddie Burke	12 & 11			Frank Staszowski	Wethersfield Country Club	
1949	Del Kinney	3 & 2			Wally Cichon	Norwich Golf Club	
1948	Eddie Burke	38th hole			Harry Nettelbladt	Rockledge Country Club	
1947	Harry Nettebladt	144		2 strokes	Stan Staszowski	Norwich Golf Club	
1946	Eddie Burke	141		1 stroke	Harry Nettelbladt	Wampanoag Country Club	
1945	Eddie Burke	144		4 strokes	J.J. "Bud" Geoghegan	Avon Golf Club	
1942−1944: No tournament due to World War II
1941	Hubert Hunsick	140		4 strokes	Willie Hunter, Stan Starzec	Indian Hill Country Club	
1940	Eddie Burke	9 & 8			Ken Reid	Woodbridge Country Club	
1939	Ralph Greenwood	5 & 4			Paul Bell	Indian Hill Country Club	
1938	Hubert Hunsick	2&1			Willie Hunter	Indian Hill Country Club	
1937	Waldo Martin	3&2			Jack Perkins	Indian Hill Country Club	
1936	Joe Turnesa	299		Playoff	Willie Whalen	Torrington Country Club	
1935	Joe Turnesa	145	−1	5 strokes	Herb Armstrong	Rockledge Country Club	
1934	George Hunter	147		4 strokes	Willie Whalen	The Country Club	
1933	Gene Kunes	148		4 strokes	Graham Reid	The Country Club	
1932	Jack Perkins	149		1 stroke	Eddie Lund	Country Club of Waterbury	
1931	Gene Kunes	154			Charles Nicoll	Indian Hill (Sequin) Country Club	
1930	George Siebert	149		Playoff (Note: Siebert won in a sudden-death playoff.)	Peter Manning	Indian Hill (Sequin) Country Club	
1929	Maurice Kearney	157		2 strokes	Peter Manning, Alex Simpson	Wampanoag Country Club	
