= Al Watrous =

American professional golfer (1899–1983)

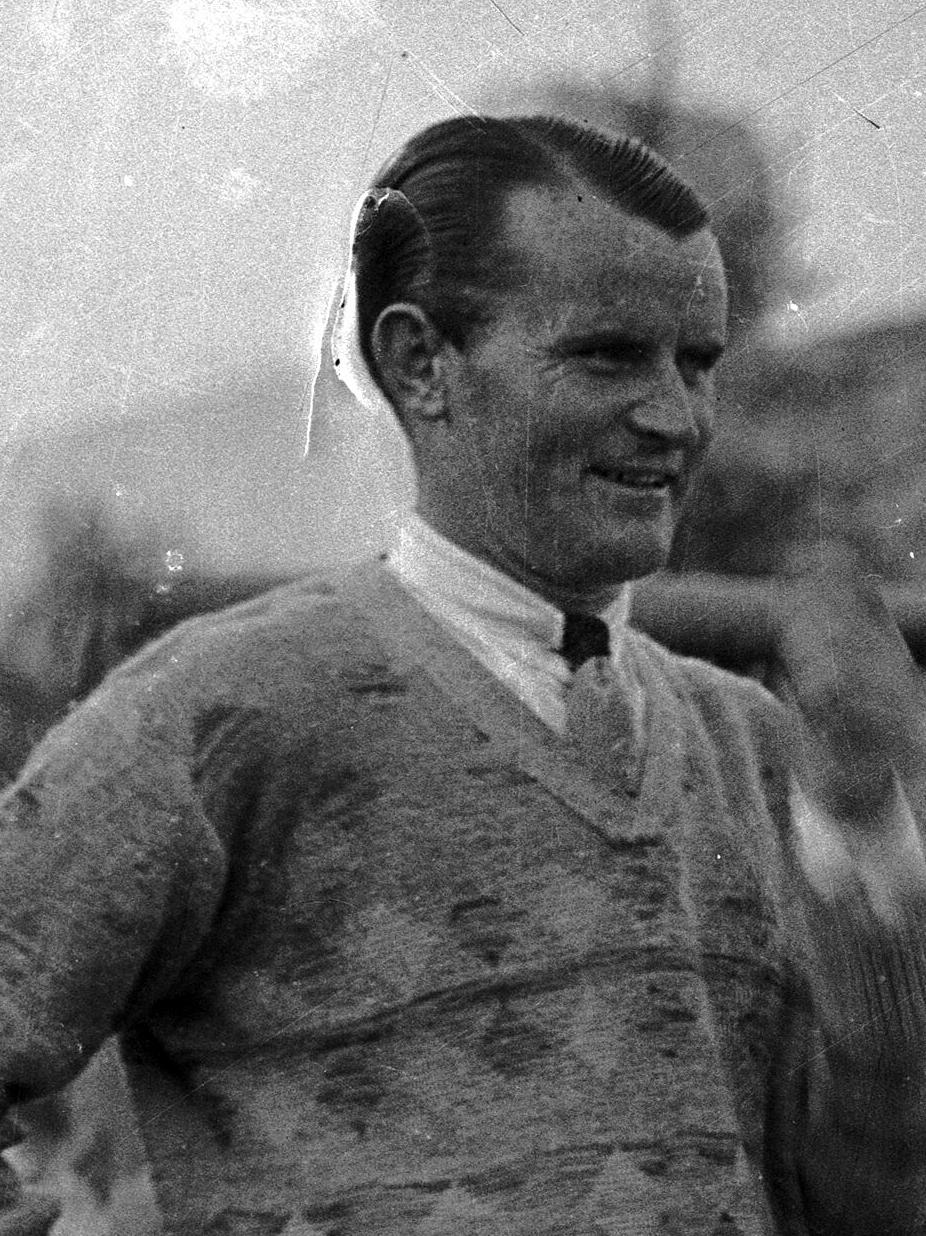
- Watrous in 1926

Personal information
- Full name: Albert Andrew Watrous
- Nationality: United States
- Born: February 1, 1899 Yonkers, New York, U.S.
- Died: December 3, 1983 (aged 84) Royal Oak, Michigan, U.S.
- Height: 5 ft 11.5 in (1.82 m)
- Weight: 178 lb (81 kg; 12.7 st)
- Spouse: Agnes J. Watrous
- Children: 5

Career
- Sport: Golf
- Status: Professional
- Former tour: PGA Tour
- Professional wins: 34

Number of wins by tour
- PGA Tour: 8
- Other: 26

Best results in major championships
- Masters Tournament: 7th: 1937
- PGA Championship: T3: 1935
- U.S. Open: T8: 1923
- The Open Championship: 2nd: 1926

Achievements and awards
- National Polish-American Sports Hall of Fame: 1979
- Michigan Golf Hall of Fame: 1982

Albert Andrew Watrous (February 1, 1899 – December 3, 1983) was an American professional golfer who played on the PGA Tour in the 1920s and 1930s.

== Early life ==
Watrous was born in Yonkers, New York, of Polish descent. He moved to Michigan at an early age.

== Professional career ==
Watrous played on the first two Ryder Cup teams in 1927 and 1929. Watrous was the club pro at Oakland Hills Country Club in Bloomfield Hills, Michigan, for 37 years. Watrous had tremendous success in Michigan events, winning the Michigan PGA Championship nine times and the Michigan Open six times.

Watrous never won a major championship, but came very close in the 1926 Open Championship at Royal Lytham & St Annes Golf Club. Playing with Bobby Jones in the final round, and tied with him, Watrous hit the green in two shots on the difficult par-4 17th hole, with Jones in trouble after his tee shot finished in sandy dunes and tall grass far left of the fairway. But from this very difficult position, Jones hit one of the greatest recovery shots in golf history from 175 yards, as his ball finished on the green nearer than Watrous', who three-putted, and finished second to Jones.

Watrous had much success as a senior. He won the PGA Seniors Championship three times after he turned 50.

== Death ==
Watrous died on December 3, 1983, in Royal Oak, Michigan.

== Awards and honors ==
- On June 14, 1979, Watrous was inducted into the National Polish-American Sports Hall of Fame and Museum
- In 1982, he was inducted with the charter class at the Michigan Golf Hall of Fame
- A collegiate golf tournament named in his honor, the Al Watrous Memorial Intercollegiate Invitational, was first played in 2009.

== Professional wins ==
=== PGA Tour wins (8) ===
- 1922 (1) Canadian Open
- 1925 (2) South Central Open, Corpus Christi Open
- 1927 (1) Michigan Open
- 1929 (1) Michigan Open
- 1932 (2) Mid-South Open (tie with Henry Picard and Al Houghton), Mid-South Bestball (with Tommy Armour)
- 1933 (1) Lakeland Open

=== Other wins ===
Note: This list is probably incomplete.

- 1922 Michigan PGA Championship
- 1924 Michigan PGA Championship
- 1926 Michigan Open
- 1930 Michigan Open
- 1932 Michigan PGA Championship
- 1936 Michigan PGA Championship
- 1938 Michigan PGA Championship
- 1939 Michigan PGA Championship
- 1941 Michigan PGA Championship
- 1943 Michigan Open
- 1949 Michigan Open
- 1952 Michigan PGA Championship
- 1954 Michigan PGA Championship

=== Senior wins ===
- 1950 PGA Seniors' Championship
- 1951 PGA Seniors' Championship
- 1953 Michigan PGA Senior Championship
- 1954 Michigan PGA Senior Championship
- 1956 Michigan PGA Senior Championship
- 1957 PGA Seniors' Championship, Michigan PGA Senior Championship, World Senior Championship
- 1961 Michigan PGA Senior Championship

== Results in major championships ==
Tournament	1921	1922	1923	1924	1925	1926	1927	1928	1929
U.S. Open	32	37	T8	WD	T13	WD	T18	T41	T32
The Open Championship						2			T8
PGA Championship		R32	R64	R16	R32	R32		R16	SF

Tournament	1930	1931	1932	1933	1934	1935	1936	1937	1938	1939
Masters Tournament	NYF	NYF	NYF	NYF	T11	34	T29	7	T27	25
U.S. Open	T17	T15	T35	T13	T14	T33	T32	CUT		
The Open Championship										
PGA Championship	R16		R32		QF	SF		R32		R16

Tournament	1940	1941	1942	1943	1944	1945	1946	1947	1948	1949
Masters Tournament	T21	32		NT	NT	NT	T32			
U.S. Open	CUT	52	NT	NT	NT	NT	T43			
The Open Championship	NT	NT	NT	NT	NT	NT				
PGA Championship	R32			NT				R64	R64	

Tournament	1950	1951	1952	1953	1954	1955	1956	1957	1958	1959
Masters Tournament										
U.S. Open		T35								
The Open Championship					T42					
PGA Championship	R32			R64		R64		R64		

Tournament	1960	1961
Masters Tournament		
U.S. Open		CUT
The Open Championship		
PGA Championship		CUT

Top 10
Did not play

NYF = tournament not yet founded
NT = no tournament
WD = withdrew
CUT = missed the half-way cut
R64, R32, R16, QF, SF = round in which player lost in PGA Championship match play
"T" indicates a tie for a place

=== Summary ===
Tournament	Wins	2nd	3rd	Top-5	Top-10	Top-25	Events	Cuts made
Masters Tournament	0	0	0	0	1	4	9	9
U.S. Open	0	0	0	0	1	7	22	17
The Open Championship	0	1	0	1	2	2	3	3
PGA Championship	0	0	2	3	7	14	21	20
Totals	0	1	2	4	11	27	55	49

- Most consecutive cuts made – 23 (1926 Open Championship – 1937 Masters)
- Longest streak of top-10s – 2 (1929 Open Championship – 1929 PGA)

== See also ==
- List of golfers with most PGA Tour wins
