= New Jersey PGA Championship =

Golf tournament

The New Jersey PGA Championship is a golf tournament that is the section championship of the New Jersey section of the PGA of America. It has been played annually since 1928 at a variety of courses around the state. The format from 1932 to 1934 and 1954 to 1957 was match play. Since 1958, the format has been stroke play. It was considered a PGA Tour event in the 1920s and 1930s.

== Winners ==
- 2026 Bill Hook
- 2025 Grant Sturgeon
- 2024 Tyler Hall
- 2023 Brian Gaffney
- 2022 Nick Bova
- 2021 Tyler Hall
- 2020 Danny Lewis
- 2019 Brett Jones
- 2018 Brent Studer
- 2017 Alex Beach
- 2016 Alex Beach
- 2015 Brent Studer
- 2014 Pat Fillian
- 2013 Frank Esposito, Jr.
- 2012 Brian Gaffney
- 2011 Sam Kang
- 2010 Frank Esposito, Jr.
- 2009 Frank Esposito, Jr.
- 2008 Brent Studer
- 2007 Frank Esposito, Jr.
- 2006 Bill Britton
- 2005 Bill Britton
- 2004 Joey Rassett
- 2003 Frank Esposito, Jr.
- 2002 Steve Sieg
- 2001 Mike Burke Jr.
- 2000 Chris Dachisen
- 1999 Mike Burke Jr.
- 1998 Brent Studer
- 1997 John Klocksin
- 1996 Robin Kohberger
- 1995 Gary Ostrega
- 1994 Jamie Fordyce
- 1993 Bill King
- 1992 Mike Burke Jr.
- 1991 Steve Sieg
- 1990 Ed Whitman
- 1989 Peter Oosterhuis
- 1988 Bill King
- 1987 Ed Whitman
- 1986 David Glenz
- 1985 David Glenz
- 1984 Gary Ostrega
- 1983 Ed Whitman
- 1982 Ed Whitman
- 1981 Pat Schwab
- 1980 Carlton White
- 1979 Tom Ulozas
- 1978 Babe Lichardus
- 1977 Babe Lichardus
- 1976 Bill Ziobro
- 1975 Gary Head
- 1974 Charles Huckaby
- 1973 John Buczek
- 1972 Dick Pearce
- 1971 Pat Schwab
- 1970 Pat Schwab
- 1969 Bob Shields
- 1968 Pat Schwab
- 1967 Stan Mosel
- 1966 Babe Lichardus
- 1965 Babe Lichardus
- 1964 Wes Ellis
- 1963 Wes Ellis
- 1962 Wes Ellis
- 1961 Wes Ellis
- 1960 Al Mengert
- 1959 Harold Sanderson
- 1958 Jake Zastko
- 1957 Emery Thomas
- 1956 Stan Mosel
- 1955 Otto Greiner
- 1954 Fred Backer
- 1953 Babe Lichardus
- 1952 Lou Barbaro
- 1951 Emery Thomas
- 1950 Emery Thomas
- 1949 Vic Ghezzi
- 1948 Angelo Petraglia
- 1947 Gene Kunes
- 1946 Jack Mitchell
- 1945 Emery Thomas
- 1944 Dave O'Connell
- 1943 Emery Thomas
- 1942 Johnny Kinder
- 1941 Frank Walsh
- 1940 Frank Walsh
- 1939 Vic Ghezzi
- 1938 Craig Wood
- 1937 Johnny Kinder
- 1936 Vic Ghezzi
- 1935 Maurrie O'Connor
- 1934 Johnny Kinder
- 1933 Johnny Kinder
- 1932 Craig Wood
- 1931 Clarence Clark
- 1930 Craig Wood
- 1929 Jack Forrester
- 1928 Craig Wood
