= Winged Foot Golf Club =

Golf club in Mamaroneck, New York, United States

Coordinates: 40°57′45″N 73°45′13″W

- Location in the United States Winged Foot Golf Club (New York)

Club information
- Location: Mamaroneck, New York
- Established: 1921, opened 1923
- Type: Private
- Total holes: 36
- Tournaments: PGA Championship (1) U.S. Open (6) U.S. Women's Open (2) U.S. Amateur (2) U.S. Senior Open (1)
- Website: wfgc.org

West Course
- Designed by: A. W. Tillinghast (1923), Gil Hanse & Jim Wagner (2018 renovation)
- Par: 72 (70 for majors)
- Length: 7,426 yards (6,790 m) (7,477 yards on 2020 U.S. Open)
- Course rating: 76.4
- Slope rating: 140

East Course
- Designed by: A. W. Tillinghast; Gil Hanse & Jim Wagner (2020 renovation)
- Par: 72
- Length: 6,808 yards (6,225 m)
- Course rating: 73.6
- Slope rating: 140
- Course record
- Winged Foot Golf Club
- U.S. National Register of Historic Places
- U.S. National Historic Landmark
- New York State Register of Historic Places
- Location within New York
- NRHP reference No.: 100004089
- NYSRHP No.: 11907.000019

Significant dates
- Added to NRHP: June 12, 2019
- Designated NHL: December 13, 2024
- Designated NYSRHP: April 29, 2019
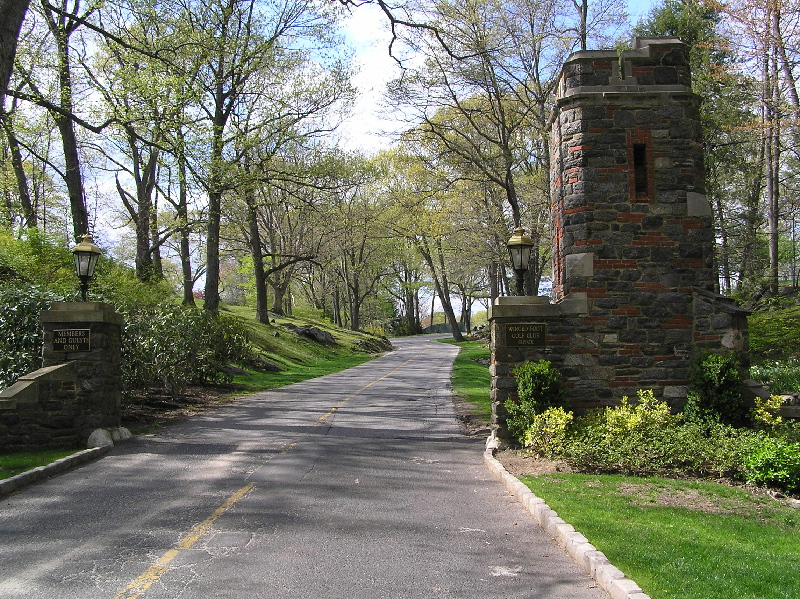
- The main entrance in 2006

Winged Foot Golf Club is a private golf club in the Northeastern United States, located in Mamaroneck, New York, a suburb northeast of New York City. The club was founded in 1921, by a group largely made up of members of The New York Athletic Club, and opened in June 1923. Winged Foot's name and logo are taken directly from a sculpture in the lobby floor of the New York Athletic Club in Manhattan.

Winged Foot has two 18-hole golf courses, the West and the East, both of which were designed by A. W. Tillinghast. The West Course is a par 72 that measures 7,477 yards (6,837 m); it has a course rating of 76.4 and a slope of 140. The East Course is a par 72 that measures 6,808 yards (6,225 m); it has a course rating of 73.6 and a slope of 140. Golf Digest ranked the West Course 8th and the East Course 65th in its 2009-10 listing of America's 100 Greatest Golf Courses.

In 2019 Winged Foot was listed on the National Register of Historic Places, as the last course Tillinghast designed that was complemented by a Clifford Charles Wendehack clubhouse. It was designated a National Historic Landmark in 2024.

== Head professionals at Winged Foot ==
Name	Years
Dan Mackie	1923
Mike Brady	1924–1937
Craig Wood	1938–1945
Claude Harmon	1946–1977
Tom Nieporte	1978–2006
John Buczek	2007–2009
Mike Gilmore	2010–

Winged Foot member Tommy Armour won three major titles: the 1927 U.S. Open, 1930 PGA Championship, and the 1931 Open Championship.

Claude Harmon Sr. was the head professional at Winged Foot G.C. when he won the 1948 Masters and collected a check for $2,500. He was the last club professional to win a major championship. Previously, Winged Foot head professional Craig Wood won the 1941 Masters and U.S. Open, the first time any golfer won those two titles in the same year.

== Major championships held at Winged Foot ==
Winged Foot's West Course has hosted the U.S. Open six times and the PGA Championship once. The East Course has hosted the U.S. Women's Open twice and the U.S. Senior Open.

Winged Foot Golf Club has also hosted the U.S. Amateur twice; in 2004, the tournament was contested on both courses. The 1949 Walker Cup was played on the West Course.

In January 2013, the United States Golf Association announced that Winged Foot Golf Club would host the 120th U.S. Open in 2020. With its sixth U.S. Open, only Oakmont Country Club and Baltusrol Golf Club have hosted the tournament more times.

For USGA championships, the West Course has been typically set up at par 70. In this configuration the 514-yard (470 m) converted par five ninth hole becomes one of the longest par fours in major championship history. The 640-yard (585 m) par five twelfth is the sixth longest hole in major championship history.

Ogilvy's 2006 winning score of five-over-par and Irwin's seven-over in 1974 represent two of the highest major championship 72-hole scores in the modern era of golf. Julius Boros' winning score of 293 (+9) in the 1963 U.S. Open (at The Country Club near Boston), played in gusty winds, represents both the highest aggregate score and highest score in relation to par during this era.

On January 9, 2023, it was announced Winged Foot will host the U.S. Open for a seventh time in 2028, the first since 2006 at the course with ticketed spectators.

Year	Course(s)	Major	Winner	Score	Margin of victory	Runner(s)-up	Winner's share ($)
2020	West	U.S. Open	(United States) Bryson DeChambeau	274 (−6)	6 strokes	(United States) Matthew Wolff	2,250,000
2006	West	U.S. Open	(Australia) Geoff Ogilvy	285 (+5)	1 stroke	(United States) Jim Furyk (United States) Phil Mickelson (Scotland) Colin Montgomerie	1,225,000
2004	West and East (Note: Qualifying medal rounds were played on both courses, with the knockout match play rounds held on the West course only.)	U.S. Amateur	(United States) Ryan Moore	2 up		(United States) Luke List	–
1997	West	PGA Championship	(United States) Davis Love III	269 (–11)	5 strokes	(United States) Justin Leonard	470,000
1984	West	U.S. Open	(United States) Fuzzy Zoeller	276 (−4)	Playoff (Note: Fuzzy Zoeller defeated Greg Norman by 8 strokes in an 18-hole playoff; Zoeller 67, Norman 75.)	(Australia) Greg Norman	94,000
1980	East	U.S. Senior Open	(Argentina) Roberto De Vicenzo	285 (+1)	4 strokes	(United States) William C. Campbell	20,000
1974	West	U.S. Open	(United States) Hale Irwin	287 (+7)	2 strokes	(United States) Forrest Fezler	35,000
1972	East	U.S. Women's Open	(United States) Susie Berning	299 (+11)	1 stroke	(United States) Kathy Ahern (United States) Pam Barnett (United States) Judy Rankin	6,000
1959	West	U.S. Open	(United States) Billy Casper	282 (+2)	1 stroke	(United States) Bob Rosburg	12,000
1957	East	U.S. Women's Open	(United States) Betsy Rawls	299 (+7)	6 strokes	(United States) Patty Berg	1,800
1940	West	U.S. Amateur	(United States) Dick Chapman	11 and 9		(United States) W. B. McCullough Jr.	–
1929	West (Note: The East Course was scheduled to host the U.S. Open in 1929 but storm damage caused the championship to be switched to the West Course.)	U.S. Open	(United States) Bobby Jones (a)	294 (+6)	Playoff (Note: Bobby Jones defeated Al Espinosa by 23 strokes in a 36-hole playoff; Jones 141, Espinosa 164.)	(United States) Al Espinosa	1,000 (Note: Since Jones was an amateur, runner-up Al Espinosa received the first place prize money.)

== Scorecard ==
=== West Course ===
Tee	Rating/Slope	1	2	3	4	5	6	7	8	9	Out	10	11	12	13	14	15	16	17	18	In	Total
2020 U.S. Open		451	484	243	467	502	321	162	490	565	3,685	214	384	633	212	452	426	498	504	469	3,792	7,477
Par		4	4	3	4	4	4	3	4	5	35	3	4	5	3	4	4	4	4	4	35	70
Blue	M:76.4 / 140	451	475	243	461	516	321	167	493	572	3,699	194	384	633	219	452	426	490	469	460	3,727	7,426
Black	M:74.3 / 134	429	404	218	428	497	321	159	471	513	3,440	187	376	562	210	416	414	460	442	430	3,497	6,937
White	M:72.2 / 132 W:79.5 / 145	405	375	192	415	484	313	148	423	458	3,213	180	369	511	201	374	396	436	428	414	3,309	6,522
Green	M:69.8 / 130 W:75.7 / 136	386	349	169	361	472	296	133	380	433	2,979	169	311	450	182	348	371	414	404	391	3,040	6,019
Gold	M:67.4 / 124 W:72.6 / 129	331	311	138	337	440	289	130	351	406	2,733	146	276	409	147	341	339	384	354	352	2,748	5,481
Par		4	4	3	4	5	4	3	4	5	36	3	4	5	3	4	4	5	4	4	36	72

=== East Course ===
Tee	Rating/Slope	1	2	3	4	5	6	7	8	9	Out	10	11	12	13	14	15	16	17	18	In	Total
Blue	M:73.6 / 140	400	504	148	542	444	196	472	451	402	3,559	354	363	546	146	407	338	449	231	415	3,249	6,808
White	M:72.2 / 136	373	466	141	538	388	174	437	441	386	3,344	342	355	538	141	385	324	434	209	381	3,109	6,453
Green	M:70.0 / 130 W:74.8 / 134	333	456	122	456	370	148	358	424	365	3,032	325	340	505	125	376	310	411	189	349	2,930	5,962
Gold	M:67.3 / 124 W:72.9 / 123	303	419	122	446	313	148	358	371	317	2,797	300	300	410	123	313	262	371	182	319	2,580	5,377
Par		4	5	3	5	4	3	4	5	4	37	4	4	5	3	4	4	4	3	4	35	72

== See also ==
- National Register of Historic Places listings in southern Westchester County, New York
