= Suzy Whaley =

American professional golfer (born 1966)

Personal information
- Nationality: United States
- Born: November 10, 1966 (age 59)

Career
- Sport: Golf
- Status: Professional
- Former tour: LPGA Tour

Best results in LPGA major championships
- Chevron Championship: DNP
- Women's PGA C'ship: CUT: 2003, 2004, 2005
- U.S. Women's Open: DNP
- du Maurier Classic: DNP
- Women's British Open: DNP

Suzy Whaley (born November 10, 1966) is an American professional golfer.

== Career ==
Whaley was born in 1966. She is from Connecticut. While at University of North Carolina, she played on their golf team.

Whaley is an LPGA Teaching and Club Professional (T&CP) member who played on the LPGA Tour in 1993.

In 2003, she became the first woman in 58 years to qualify for a PGA Tour event when she qualified for the 2003 Greater Hartford Open, after winning the 2002 Connecticut PGA Championship. She was also the first woman to win a PGA individual professional tournament. Whaley's achievement, however, is questioned by some because the regional qualifying tournament she won was aided by her being allowed to play the course off tees 699 yards shorter than the men she competed against in that regional qualifying. Whaley played 6,239 yards, while the men had to play 6,938 yards (a 10% shorter course). ESPN described her in 2003 as "a 36-year-old club pro who played briefly on the LPGA tour." At the time, her mother was her caddie.

This anomaly was addressed later by the PGA, under the "Whaley rule", introduced in 2003, which requires all entrants at qualifying tournaments, whether male or female, to play off the same tees.

In 2014, Whaley became the first female officer in the PGA of America, as PGA secretary. In November 2018, became the first woman president of the PGA of America.

She is currently recognized by Golf for Women as a top 50 female instructor and is a board member and advisor for numerous organizations, including Golfer Girl Magazine.

== Personal life ==
Both of her daughters and a niece play golf, and have participated in the Girls Junior PGA National Championships.

== Awards and honors ==
In 2021, Whaley was inducted into the Connecticut Golf Hall of Fame.
