= Inwood Country Club =

Golf club in Inwood, New York, U.S.

Coordinates: 40°37′16″N 73°45′22″W

- Interactive map of Inwood Country Club

Club information
- Location: Inwood, New York
- Established: 1901
- Type: Private
- Total holes: 18
- Tournaments: 1921 PGA Championship; 1923 U.S. Open
- Website: inwoodcc.org
- Designed by: William Exton and Arthur Thatcher (1901); Edward Eriksen (1906 expansion); Herbert Strong (redesign)
- Par: 71
- Length: 6,747 yards (6,169 m) (blue tees)
- Course rating: 72.4
- Slope rating: 133

Inwood Country Club is a private golf club in Inwood, New York, on Jamaica Bay in Nassau County, near John F. Kennedy International Airport. It was founded in 1901, when William Exton and Arthur Thatcher laid out a nine-hole course. The course was extended to 18 holes in 1906 and later remodeled by Herbert Strong, the club's head professional.

Inwood hosted two major championships in the early 1920s. The first was the 1921 PGA Championship, won by Walter Hagen. The second was the 1923 U.S. Open, where the amateur Bobby Jones won his first major title in a playoff against Bobby Cruickshank. Beginning in the 1990s, the architect Tom Doak renovated the course. In 2023 the club was listed on the New York State Register of Historic Places.

== History ==
=== Founding and early years ===
Inwood Country Club began when Jacob Wertheim, a tobacco merchant, leased a potato field. William Exton and Arthur Thatcher laid out a nine-hole course there in 1901. The club's professional, Edward Eriksen, enlarged the course to 18 holes in 1906. In 1912, the club hired the English golfer Herbert Strong as head professional. By the 1923 U.S. Open, Strong had reworked the course into a tight layout that penalized wayward shots.

=== Major championships ===
Inwood hosted the 1921 PGA Championship from September 27 to October 1. It was a match-play event with 32 players. Walter Hagen defeated Jim Barnes 3 and 2 in the final, the first of his five PGA Championship victories.

The club hosted the U.S. Open in July 1923. The 21-year-old amateur Bobby Jones led by three strokes after three rounds. Bobby Cruickshank birdied the last hole to tie him at 296. Jones won the 18-hole playoff the next day, 76 to 78. It was the first of Jones's 13 major championships.

=== Later years ===
Beginning in the 1990s, the golf architect Tom Doak renovated the course, working from photographs in the club's collection and aerial surveys taken in 1926.

On September 28, 2023, the club was listed on the New York State Register of Historic Places. The state's Office of Parks, Recreation and Historic Preservation also found that the club meets the criteria for listing on the National Register of Historic Places.

== Course ==
The course sits on a peninsula in Jamaica Bay, close to John F. Kennedy International Airport. From the blue tees it measures 6,747 yards (6,169 m), with a par of 71. The opening stretch includes three par 5s in succession, followed immediately by two par 3s. Credit for the design is shared among Exton and Thatcher, Eriksen, and Strong. (Note: Golf Course Architecture credits the 1901 layout to Exton and Thatcher and the 1906 expansion to Eriksen. LINKS describes Strong's remodeling of the course, and its course profile names Eriksen, Strong and Jack Mackie as the architects.)

Scorecard
Tee	Men's rating/slope	1	2	3	4	5	6	7	8	9	Out	10	11	12	13	14	15	16	17	18	In	Total
Blue	72.4 / 133	345	368	514	555	522	171	221	426	417	3,539	114	450	456	353	163	468	383	413	408	3,208	6,747
White	71.3 / 131	332	342	500	527	480	160	207	396	403	3,347	96	418	437	325	140	468	363	377	398	3,022	6,369
Green	68.6 / 124	320	315	406	485	468	153	192	370	327	3,036	96	319	367	306	130	402	350	352	364	2,686	5,722
Par		4	4	5	5	5	3	3	4	4	37	3	4	4	4	3	4/5	4	4	4	34/35	71/72

== Facilities ==
The club has a Georgian-style clubhouse and Har-Tru tennis courts. It also operates a private beach club in Atlantic Beach, New York.

== Tournaments hosted ==
Major championships hosted at Inwood Country Club
Year	Tournament	Winner	Runner-up	Result
1923	U.S. Open	Bobby Jones (a)	Bobby Cruickshank	296; won 18-hole playoff 76–78
1921	PGA Championship	Walter Hagen	Jim Barnes	3 and 2

(a) denotes amateur

== Notes ==
Preceded by Flossmoor Country Club	Host of the PGA Championship; 1921	Succeeded by Oakmont Country Club
Preceded by Skokie Country Club	Host of the U.S. Open; 1923	Succeeded by Oakland Hills Country Club
