= 1974 U.S. Open (golf) =

Coordinates: 40.958°N 73.754°W

Tournament information
- Dates: June 13–16, 1974
- Location: Mamaroneck, New York
- Courses: Winged Foot Golf Club; West Course
- Organized by: USGA
- Tour: PGA Tour

Statistics
- Par: 70
- Length: 6,961 yards (6,365 m)
- Field: 150 players, 66 after cut
- Cut: 153 (+13)
- Prize fund: $227,700
- Winner's share: $35,000

Champion
- (United States) Hale Irwin
- 287 (+7)

Location in the United States
Location in New York

The 1974 U.S. Open was the 74th U.S. Open, held June 13–16 at Winged Foot Golf Club in Mamaroneck, New York, a suburb northeast of New York City. In what became known as the "Massacre at Winged Foot," Hale Irwin's score of 287 (+7) was good enough for the first of his three U.S. Open titles, two strokes ahead of runner-up Forrest Fezler.

== Tournament summary ==
In the first round, with an even-par 70, Gary Player took the solo lead. In the second round Player shot a three-over-par 73 and retained the lead, now tied with Hale Irwin, Raymond Floyd, and Arnold Palmer. This group led by one over Tom Kite and Tom Watson.

In the third-round Watson shot a one-under-par 69 to take a one-stroke lead over Irwin. Palmer stayed in contention with a 73 (+3), now in solo third. However Player, Floyd, and Kite fell out of contention with significantly over-par rounds.

In the final round Watson bogeyed holes 4, 5, and 8 on the front nine to lose the lead to Irwin. He then bogeyed six more holes on the back nine to fall out of contention. Journeyman golfer Forrest Fezler shot one-under-par through the first 15 holes to suddenly move into contention. He then made long par putts at 16 and 17 to stay near the lead. Needing a birdie at 18 to tie Irwin, Fezler missed the green and could not convert another lengthy par save at the last, missing from fifteen feet (4.6 m) to finish with an even-par 70. He finished at 289 (+9), the clubhouse leader, but multiple strokes behind Irwin, still the overall leader. Irwin bogeyed the 15th and 16th holes but made a 10-footer (3 m) to save par at 17th. With a two-shot lead heading to the 18th, Irwin hit his approach to the center of the green and two-putted for par and the championship.

Winged Foot played extremely difficult throughout the tournament, leading sportswriter Dick Schaap to coin the phrase "The Massacre at Winged Foot," also the title of his book about the tournament. Irwin's 7-over total tied for second-highest aggregate winning score since 1935. Many complained that the USGA had intentionally made the course setup treacherous in response to Johnny Miller's record-breaking 63 the year before.

Sam Snead, age 62, broke a rib during practice on Wednesday and withdrew.

== Course layout ==
| Hole | 1 | 2 | 3 | 4 | 5 | 6 | 7 | 8 | 9 | Out | 10 | 11 | 12 | 13 | 14 | 15 | 16 | 17 | 18 | In | Total |
|---|---|---|---|---|---|---|---|---|---|---|---|---|---|---|---|---|---|---|---|---|---|
| Yards | 446 | 411 | 216 | 460 | 515 | 324 | 166 | 442 | 466 | 3,446 | 190 | 382 | 535 | 212 | 435 | 417 | 452 | 444 | 448 | 3,515 | 6,961 |
| Par | 4 | 4 | 3 | 4 | 5 | 4 | 3 | 4 | 4 | 35 | 3 | 4 | 5 | 3 | 4 | 4 | 4 | 4 | 4 | 35 | 70 |

== Round summaries ==
=== First round ===
Thursday, June 13, 1974

| Place | Player | Score | To par |
|---|---|---|---|
| 1 | (South Africa) Gary Player | 70 | E |
| T2 | (United States) Lou Graham | 71 | +1 |
| T2 | (United States) Mike Reasor | 71 | +1 |
| T4 | (United States) Jim Colbert | 72 | +2 |
| T4 | (Australia) Bruce Crampton | 72 | +2 |
| T4 | (United States) Raymond Floyd | 72 | +2 |
| T4 | (United States) Bobby Nichols | 72 | +2 |
| T4 | (United States) Barney Thompson | 72 | +2 |
| T9 | (United States) Arnold Palmer | 73 | +3 |
| T9 | (United States) Tom Watson | 73 | +3 |
| T9 | (United States) Hale Irwin | 73 | +3 |
| T9 | (United States) Rod Funseth | 73 | +3 |
| T9 | (United States) Jerry Heard | 73 | +3 |
| T9 | (Australia) David Graham | 73 | +3 |
| T9 | (United States) Mark Hayes | 73 | +3 |
| T9 | (United States) John Buczek | 73 | +3 |

=== Second round ===
Friday, June 14, 1974

| Place | Player | Score | To par |
|---|---|---|---|
| T1 | (United States) Arnold Palmer | 73-70=143 | +3 |
| T1 | (United States) Hale Irwin | 73-70=143 | +3 |
| T1 | (United States) Raymond Floyd | 72-71=143 | +3 |
| T1 | (South Africa) Gary Player | 70-73=143 | +3 |
| T5 | (United States) Tom Kite | 74-70=144 | +4 |
| T5 | (United States) Tom Watson | 73-71=144 | +4 |
| T7 | (United States) Bert Yancey | 76-69=145 | +5 |
| T7 | (United States) Forrest Fezler | 75-70=145 | +5 |
| T9 | (United States) Larry Ziegler | 78-68=146 | +6 |
| T9 | (United States) Frank Beard | 77-69=146 | +6 |
| T9 | (United States) Eddie Pearce | 75-71=146 | +6 |
| T9 | (United States) John Buczek | 73-73=146 | +6 |
| T9 | (United States) Lou Graham | 71-75=146 | +6 |

=== Third round ===
Saturday, June 15, 1974

| Place | Player | Score | To par |
|---|---|---|---|
| 1 | (United States) Tom Watson | 73-71-69=213 | +3 |
| 2 | (United States) Hale Irwin | 73-70-71=214 | +4 |
| 3 | (United States) Arnold Palmer | 73-70-73=216 | +6 |
| T4 | (United States) Frank Beard | 77-69-72=218 | +8 |
| T4 | (United States) Bert Yancey | 76-69-73=218 | +8 |
| T4 | (United States) Jim Colbert | 72-77-69=218 | +8 |
| 7 | (United States) Forrest Fezler | 75-70-74=219 | +9 |
| T8 | (United States) Lou Graham | 71-75-74=220 | +10 |
| T8 | (South Africa) Gary Player | 70-73-77=220 | +10 |
| T10 | (United States) Raymond Floyd | 72-71-78=221 | +11 |
| T10 | (United States) Buddy Allin | 76-71-74=221 | +11 |
| T10 | (United States) Tom Kite | 74-70-77=221 | +11 |
| T10 | (United States) Dale Douglass | 77-72-72=221 | +11 |
| T10 | (United States) Tom Weiskopf | 76-73-72=221 | +11 |

=== Final round ===
Sunday, June 16, 1974

| Place | Player | Score | To par | Money ($) |
|---|---|---|---|---|
| 1 | (United States) Hale Irwin | 73-70-71-73=287 | +7 | 35,000 |
| 2 | (United States) Forrest Fezler | 75-70-74-70=289 | +9 | 18,000 |
| T3 | (United States) Lou Graham | 71-75-74-70=290 | +10 | 11,500 |
| T3 | (United States) Bert Yancey | 76-69-73-72=290 | +10 | 11,500 |
| T5 | (United States) Jim Colbert | 72-77-69-74=292 | +12 | 8,000 |
| T5 | (United States) Arnold Palmer | 73-70-73-76=292 | +12 | 8,000 |
| T5 | (United States) Tom Watson | 73-71-69-79=292 | +12 | 8,000 |
| T8 | (United States) Tom Kite | 74-70-77-72=293 | +13 | 5,500 |
| T8 | (South Africa) Gary Player | 70-73-77-73=293 | +13 | 5,500 |
| T10 | (United States) Buddy Allin | 76-71-74-73=294 | +14 | 3,750 |
| T10 | (United States) Jack Nicklaus | 75-74-76-69=294 | +14 | 3,750 |

==== Scorecard ====
| Hole | 1 | 2 | 3 | 4 | 5 | 6 | 7 | 8 | 9 | 10 | 11 | 12 | 13 | 14 | 15 | 16 | 17 | 18 |
|---|---|---|---|---|---|---|---|---|---|---|---|---|---|---|---|---|---|---|
| Par | 4 | 4 | 3 | 4 | 5 | 4 | 3 | 4 | 4 | 3 | 4 | 5 | 3 | 4 | 4 | 4 | 4 | 4 |
| (United States) Irwin | +4 | +4 | +4 | +5 | +5 | +5 | +5 | +6 | +5 | +6 | +5 | +5 | +6 | +5 | +6 | +7 | +7 | +7 |
| (United States) Fezler | +9 | +10 | +10 | +10 | +10 | +10 | +10 | +9 | +9 | +9 | +9 | +8 | +8 | +8 | +8 | +8 | +8 | +9 |
| (United States) Graham | +10 | +10 | +11 | +11 | +10 | +10 | +10 | +10 | +10 | +10 | +10 | +11 | +12 | +11 | +11 | +10 | +10 | +10 |
| (United States) Yancey | +8 | +7 | +7 | +7 | +7 | +7 | +8 | +8 | +8 | +9 | +8 | +8 | +10 | +10 | +10 | +10 | +10 | +10 |
| (United States) Watson | +3 | +3 | +3 | +4 | +5 | +5 | +5 | +6 | +6 | +7 | +7 | +8 | +9 | +9 | +10 | +10 | +11 | +12 |

Cumulative tournament scores, relative to par

| Birdie | Bogey | Double bogey |
