= Inwood, New York =

- Hamlet and census-designated place
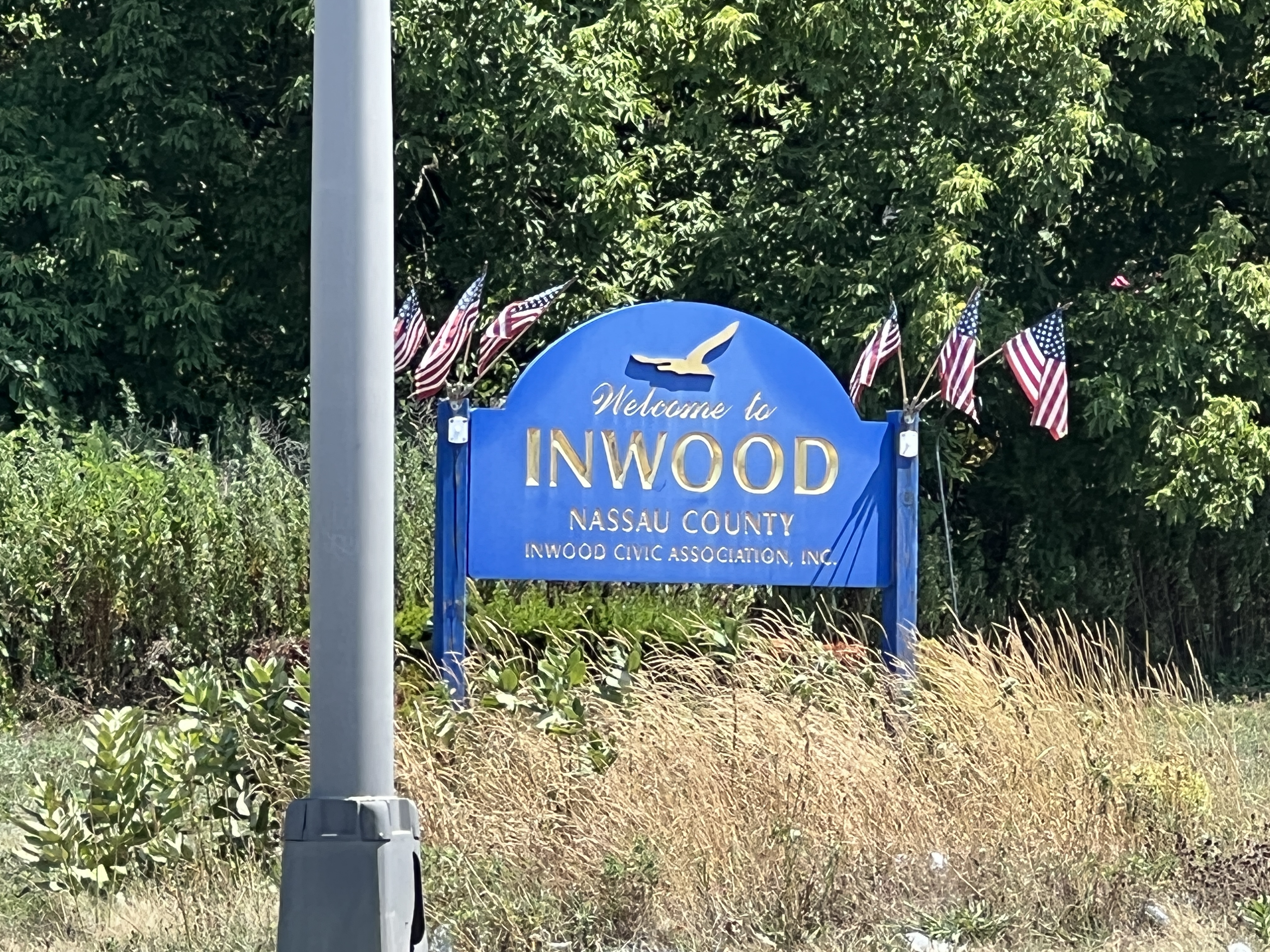
- An Inwood welcome sign on the Nassau Expressway in 2022

- Location in Nassau County and the state of New York

- Location on Long Island Location within the state of New York
- Coordinates: 40°37′9″N 73°44′45″W
- Country: United States
- State: New York
- County: Nassau
- Town: Hempstead

Area
  - Total: 2.21 sq mi (5.73 km^{2})
  - Land: 1.59 sq mi (4.13 km^{2})
  - Water: 0.62 sq mi (1.60 km^{2})
- Elevation: 9.8 ft (3 m)

Population (2020)
  - Total: 11,340
  - Density: 7,110/sq mi (2,745.2/km^{2})
- Time zone: UTC-5 (Eastern (EST))
  - Summer (DST): UTC-4 (EDT)
- ZIP Codes: 11096 (Inwood); 11559 (Lawrence); 11516 (Cedarhurst)
- Area codes: 516, 363
- FIPS code: 36-37583
- GNIS feature ID: 0953741

Inwood is a hamlet and census-designated place (CDP) in Nassau County, on Long Island, in New York, United States. It is considered part of Long Island's Five Towns area and is located within the Town of Hempstead. The population was 11,340 at the time of the 2020 census.

== History ==
Inwood was first settled in 1600s. Like many other nearby communities, the area was known as Near Rockaway. A meeting was held by the Town of Hempstead on January 16, 1663, and during that meeting, the name of what is now Inwood was changed to North West Point (also spelled as Northwest Point), named after its geographic position in relation to the more central part of Far Rockaway, which it was then part of. It became the first area which was once known as Near Rockaway to be given its own name. Its original settlers were Jamaica Bay fishermen, generally lawless and troublesome to other Rockaway residents. Soon after the American Civil War, the area in 1871 became known as Westville. The Westville designation was used as the name of the community until residents petitioned for the United States Postal Service to establish a post office in the community. The post office refused as a Westville already existed in Upstate New York. This led locals to change the community's name to Inwood in December 1888. This name received the most votes; the other proposed names included Bayhead, Springhaven, Radwayton, Elco, Raway, Pike's Peak, and Custer. By changing the community's name, the locals were able to get a post office for Inwood, which ultimately opened on February 25, 1889.

Inwood's first post office closed after roughly 30 years of operation (circa 1920), and it was not until 1949 that a new post office would open in the community – although an unsuccessful, earlier attempt to reopen it was made in 1932.

The first true road in the area, the Inwood end of Lord Avenue, was built when the neighboring village of Lawrence was developed.

When the first post office in the village was established on February 25, 1889, the name of the village was changed to Inwood; a post office named Westville already existed in New York State. By the time of World War I, a large part of Inwood's population was of Italian and Albanian extraction.

Inwood is home to the famous Inwood Country Club, which was the site of the 1921 PGA Championship – in addition to the 1923 U.S. Open.

== Geography ==
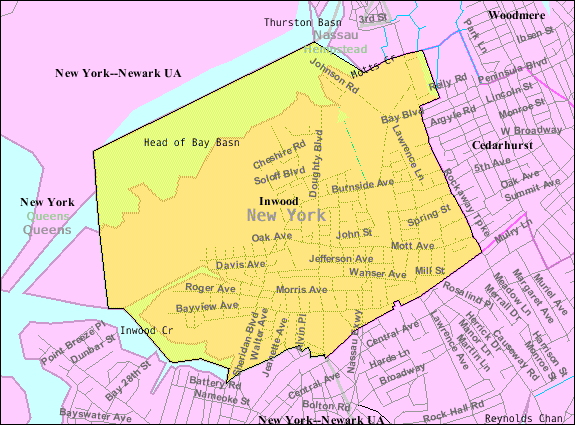
U.S. Census map of Inwood

According to the United States Census Bureau, the CDP has a total area of 2.1 square miles (5.4 km^{2}), of which 1.7 square miles (4.4 km^{2}) is land and 0.4 square miles (1.0 km^{2}) – or 20.19% – is water.

Inwood's northernmost and westernmost boundaries border Queens in the City of New York, and it is located across Head of the Bay from John F. Kennedy international Airport.

Inwood is bisected by the Nassau Expressway (New York State Route 878).

== Demographics ==
Historical population
Census	Pop.	Note	%±
2000	9,325		—
2010	9,792		5.0%
2020	11,340		15.8%
U.S. Decennial Census

=== 2020 census ===
As of the 2020 census, Inwood had a population of 11,340. The median age was 32.9 years. 28.1% of residents were under the age of 18 and 11.5% of residents were 65 years of age or older. For every 100 females there were 99.8 males, and for every 100 females age 18 and over there were 96.1 males age 18 and over.

100.0% of residents lived in urban areas, while 0.0% lived in rural areas.

There were 3,180 households in Inwood, of which 45.0% had children under the age of 18 living in them. Of all households, 45.6% were married-couple households, 17.2% were households with a male householder and no spouse or partner present, and 30.7% were households with a female householder and no spouse or partner present. About 18.4% of all households were made up of individuals and 10.7% had someone living alone who was 65 years of age or older.

There were 3,355 housing units, of which 5.2% were vacant. The homeowner vacancy rate was 1.1% and the rental vacancy rate was 3.7%.

Racial composition as of the 2020 census
Race	Number	Percent
White	3,225	28.4%
Black or African American	1,998	17.6%
American Indian and Alaska Native	147	1.3%
Asian	437	3.9%
Native Hawaiian and Other Pacific Islander	4	0.0%
Some other race	4,278	37.7%
Two or more races	1,251	11.0%
Hispanic or Latino (of any race)	5,997	52.9%

=== 2010 census ===
As of the 2010 United States census, there were 9,792 people residing in the CDP. The racial makeup of the CDP was 48.02% White, 24.15% African American, 0.74% Native American, 3.31% Asian, 0.15% Pacific Islander, 19.21% from other races, and 4.42% from two or more races. Hispanic or Latino of any race were 42.79% of the population.

=== 2000 census ===
As of the census of 2000, there were 9,325 people, 3,041 households, and 2,253 families residing in the CDP. The population density was 5,488.4 inhabitants per square mile (2,119.1/km^{2}). There were 3,132 housing units at an average density of 1,843.4 per square mile (711.7/km^{2}). The racial makeup of the CDP was 53.25% White, 25.87% African American, 0.42% Native American, 2.04% Asian, 0.02% Pacific Islander, 13.01% from other races, and 5.39% from two or more races. Hispanic or Latino of any race were 26.32% of the population.

There were 3,041 households, out of which 37.2% had children under the age of 18 living with them, 47.2% were married couples living together, 21.1% had a female householder with no husband present, and 25.9% were non-families. 21.7% of all households were made up of individuals, and 12.1% had someone living alone who was 65 years of age or older. The average household size was 3.06 and the average family size was 3.55.

In the CDP, the population was spread out, with 27.8% under the age of 18, 8.7% from 18 to 24, 30.7% from 25 to 44, 19.7% from 45 to 64, and 13.1% who were 65 years of age or older. The median age was 34 years. For every 100 females, there were 88.5 males. For every 100 females age 18 and over, there were 83.0 males.

The median income for a household in the CDP was $41,334, and the median income for a family was $48,345. Males had a median income of $36,788 versus $28,482 for females. The per capita income for the CDP was $16,009. About 12.4% of families and 14.6% of the population were below the poverty line, including 18.4% of those under age 18 and 13.7% of those age 65 or over.

== Government ==
As Inwood is an unincorporated hamlet, it is governed directly by the Town of Hempstead. The hamlet is located within the Town of Hempstead's 3rd Council District, which as of January 2024 is represented on the Hempstead Town Council by Councilwoman Melissa Miller.

== Parks and recreation ==
Inwood has a park located on a bay, with a launching pad into Mott's Basin. This park, which is operated by Nassau County, is called Inwood Park.

== Education ==
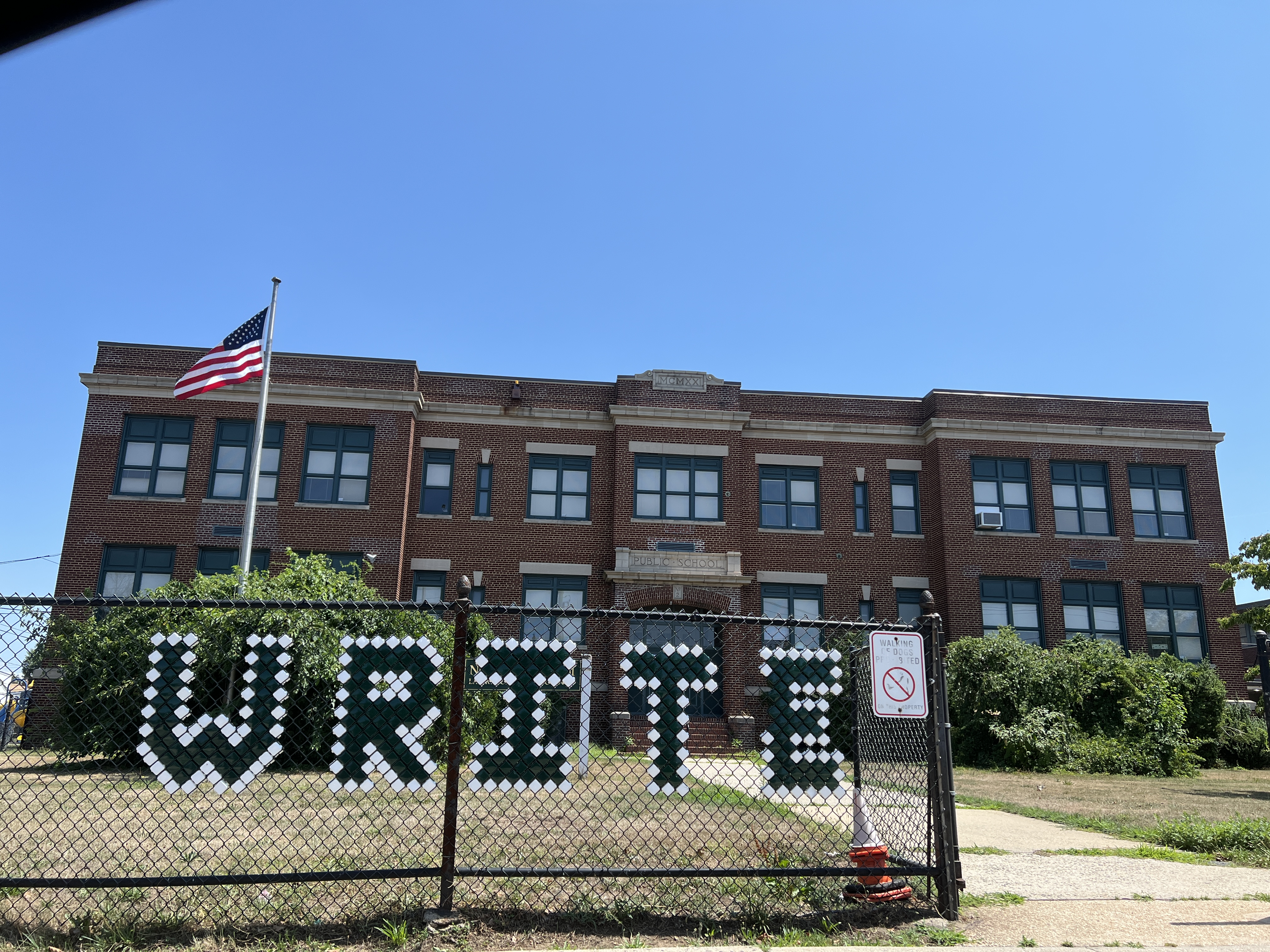
The Lawrence Union Free School District's Elementary School No. 2, located within the hamlet, in August 2022

Inwood is located entirely within the boundaries of (and is thus served by) the Lawrence Union Free School District, which also serves students from Lawrence, Cedarhurst, and Atlantic Beach, in addition to sections of North Woodmere and Woodmere. As such, children who reside within Inwood and attend public schools go to Lawrence's schools.

== Infrastructure ==
=== Rail ===
The Inwood station on Long Island Rail Road's Far Rockaway Branch is located towards the southern edge of the hamlet and provides service to Jamaica station with direct trains and connections to Pennsylvania Station, Grand Central Madison and Atlantic Terminal.

=== Bus ===
Despite being located in Nassau County, Inwood is served by both Nassau Inter-County Express (NICE) and MTA Bus.

NICE runs buses along the area's far eastern border via Rockaway Turnpike, where the n31 makes a few stops.

Unlike most Nassau County communities, bus transportation within the hamlet is primarily operated by the MTA, with the Q113 and Q114 bus routes.

=== Road ===
Major roadways within Inwood include the Nassau Expressway (NY 878) (which bisects the hamlet) and Rockaway Turnpike (CR 257).

== Notable people ==
- Ray Barbuti – Olympian.
- J. Russell Sprague – First County Executive of Nassau County.
