= Forrest Fezler =

American professional golfer (1949–2018)

Personal information
- Full name: Forrest Oliver Fezler
- Nationality: United States
- Born: September 23, 1949 Hayward, California, U.S.
- Died: December 21, 2018 (aged 69) Tallahassee, Florida, U.S.
- Height: 5 ft 9 in (1.75 m)
- Weight: 175 lb (79 kg; 12.5 st)

Career
- Sport: Golf
- College: San Jose City College
- Turned professional: 1969
- Former tour: PGA Tour
- Professional wins: 2

Number of wins by tour
- PGA Tour: 1
- Other: 1

Best results in major championships
- Masters Tournament: T30: 1975
- PGA Championship: T32: 1974
- U.S. Open: 2nd: 1974
- The Open Championship: WD: 1974

Forrest Oliver Fezler (September 23, 1949 – December 21, 2018) was an American professional golfer. His career year was in 1974, when he won the Southern Open and finished in second place to Hale Irwin at the U.S. Open.

== Early life ==
Fezler was born in Hayward, California. He first showed an interest in the game of golf as a 7-year-old boy growing up in San Jose, California, by drawing golf holes. As a youth, he would sneak onto the course at the San Jose Country Club to practice. He attended James Lick High School and was a member of the golf team; and a teammate of future fellow PGA Tour player Roger Maltbie.

== Amateur career ==
Fezler attended San Jose City College from 1968 to 1969. Fezler won the California State Amateur, Santa Clara County Championship and the California State Community College Championship in 1969.

== Professional career ==
Fezler played on the PGA Tour from 1972 to 1983, and won one event. He had 30 top-10 finishes including eight runner-up finishes. He won the PGA Rookie of the Year award in 1973. His career year was 1974 when he won the Southern Open and finished in 2nd place to Hale Irwin at the U.S. Open. This was his best finish in a major championship.

In 1976, Fezler tore the tendons in his left wrist and was forced to make major adjustments in his game – both in the number of tournaments he played and in his swing.

Fezler was unhappy with the PGA Tour's dress code that required players to wear slacks. At the 1983 U.S. Open, which is run by the USGA, Fezler was goaded by a reporter to wear shorts in protest the next day during the tournament. Before playing the last hole of the last round, he stepped into a portable toilet and changed into shorts, then left the course to avoid possible admonishment by the USGA.

He would limit his full-time professional play in 1983, and in 1984 took the head club pro job at Blackhawk Country Club in the East Bay region of California. He earned $527,000 in career winnings.

== Death ==
Fezler died on December 21, 2018, at age 69. According to his son, Jordan, he had been battling brain cancer.

== Amateur wins ==
- 1969 Santa Clara County Championship, California State Amateur, California Community College Championship

== Professional wins (2) ==
=== PGA Tour wins (1) ===
No.	Date	Tournament	Winning score	Margin of victory	Runners-up
1	Sep 8, 1974	Southern Open	−9 (70-68-68-65=271)	1 stroke	(Australia) Bruce Crampton, (United States) J. C. Snead

PGA Tour playoff record (0–1)

No.	Year	Tournament	Opponents	Result
1	1974	American Golf Classic	(United States) Gay Brewer, (United States) Jim Colbert, (United States) Raymond Floyd	Colbert won with par on second extra hole Brewer and Fezler eliminated by par on first hole

=== Other wins (1) ===
- 1975 Confidence Open

== Results in major championships ==
Tournament	1970	1971	1972	1973	1974	1975	1976	1977	1978	1979	1980	1981	1982	1983
Masters Tournament						T30								
U.S. Open	CUT		CUT	T45	2	T24		CUT		T47		T37		T50
The Open Championship					WD									
PGA Championship				CUT	T32	T50	T65		CUT					

Top 10
Did not play

CUT = missed the half-way cut
WD = withdrew
"T" = tied

== See also ==
- 1971 PGA Tour Qualifying School graduates
