= New Jersey State Open =

American golf tournament

The New Jersey State Open Championship is the New Jersey state open golf tournament, open to both amateur and professional golfers. It is organized by the New Jersey State Golf Association. It has been played annually since 1921 at a variety of courses around the state. It was considered a PGA Tour event in the 1920s and 1930s.

== Winners ==
- 2026 Rhett Sellers
- 2025 Mark Costanza (a)
- 2024 Derek Gutierrez (a)
- 2023 Brent Paladino
- 2022 Louis Kelly
- 2021 Tyler Hall
- 2020 Mark Costanza (a)
- 2019 Chris Gotterup (a)
- 2018 Marc Issler
- 2017 Luke Graboyes (a)
- 2016 Tyler Hall
- 2015 Tyler Hall
- 2014 Max Greyserman (a)
- 2013 Frank Esposito, Jr.
- 2012 Benjamin Smith (a)
- 2011 Kevin Foley
- 2010 Brian Gaffney
- 2009 Brett Jones
- 2008 Mark McCormick
- 2007 Brian Komline (a)
- 2006 Jason Lamp
- 2005 Brian Komline (a)
- 2004 Ed Whitman
- 2003 Greg Farrow
- 2002 Baker Maddera
- 2001 Chris Dachisen
- 2000 John DiMarco
- 1999 Frank Esposito, Jr.
- 1998 Kenneth Macdonald (a)
- 1997 Chris Dachisen
- 1996 Ed Whitman
- 1995 Ed Whitman
- 1994 Greg Hamilton
- 1993 Greg Hamilton
- 1992 Charlie Cowell
- 1991 Ed Whitman
- 1990 David Glenz
- 1989 Steve Sieg
- 1988 David Glenz
- 1987 Jamie Howell
- 1986 David Glenz
- 1985 Gary Ostrega
- 1984 David Glenz
- 1983 Jack Kiefer
- 1982 Russell Helwig
- 1981 Bob Issler
- 1980 Russell Helwig
- 1979 Art Silvestrone, Jr.
- 1978 Tom Ulozas
- 1977 Mike Stubblefield
- 1976 Jack Kiefer
- 1975 Jack Kiefer
- 1974 John Buczek
- 1973 Art Silvestrone, Sr.
- 1972 Art Silvestrone, Sr.
- 1971 Babe Lichardus
- 1970 Billy Ziobro (a)
- 1969 Babe Lichardus
- 1968 Ron Howell
- 1967 Pat Schwab
- 1966 Mike Burke Sr.
- 1965 Babe Lichardus
- 1964 Lester Ward
- 1963 Wes Ellis
- 1962 Wes Ellis
- 1961 Billy Farrell
- 1960 Al Mengert
- 1959 Lou Barbaro
- 1958 Al Mengert
- 1957 Al Mengert
- 1956 Chester Sanok (a)
- 1955 Stan Mosel
- 1954 David Baldwin (a)
- 1953 Lou Barbaro
- 1952 Babe Lichardus
- 1951 Chester Sanok (a)
- 1950 Emery Thomas
- 1949 Emery Thomas
- 1948 Jack Mitchell
- 1947 Gene Kunes
- 1946 Jack Mitchell
- 1945 Frank Kringle
- 1944 Vic Ghezzi
- 1943 Vic Ghezzi
- 1942 Charles Whitehead
- 1941 Jack Mitchell
- 1940 Johnny Kinder
- 1939 Jim Barnes
- 1938 Ted Turner
- 1937 Vic Ghezzi
- 1936 Johnny Farrell
- 1935 Byron Nelson
- 1934 Craig Wood
- 1933 Clarence Clark
- 1932 Johnny Kinder
- 1931 Johnny Kinder
- 1930 Paul Runyan
- 1929 Johnny Golden
- 1928 Johnny Golden
- 1927 Johnny Golden
- 1926 Clarence Hackney
- 1925 Clarence Hackney
- 1924 Clarence Hackney
- 1923 Dave Campbell
- 1922 Martin J. O'Loughlin
- 1921 Peter O'Hara

(a) denotes amateur
