= Jack Kiefer (golfer) =

American professional golfer (1940–1999)

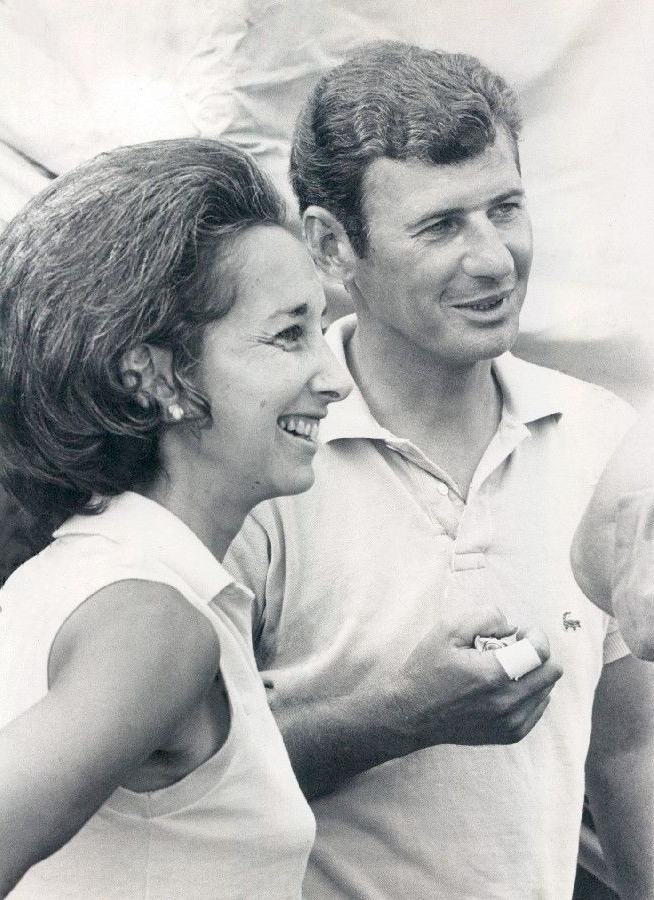
- Kiefer with wife in 1970

Personal information
- Full name: Leo C. Kiefer
- Nickname: Jack
- Nationality: United States
- Born: January 1, 1940 Columbia, Pennsylvania, U.S.
- Died: September 24, 1999 (aged 59) Stuart, Florida, U.S.

Career
- Sport: Golf
- College: Millersville State College
- Turned professional: 1967
- Former tour: Champions Tour
- Professional wins: 6

Number of wins by tour
- PGA Tour Champions: 2

Best results in major championships
- Masters Tournament: DNP
- PGA Championship: T60: 1976
- U.S. Open: DNP
- The Open Championship: DNP

Leo C. "Jack" Kiefer (January 1, 1940 – September 24, 1999) was an American professional golfer who won two Senior PGA Tour events in the 1990s.

== Career ==
Kiefer was born in Columbia, Pennsylvania. He attended Millersville State College.

In 1967, Kiefer turned professional. Kiefer spent his regular career years working as a club and teaching pro. He played in a small number of PGA Tour events. His best finish in a major championship — the only major he played — was a T-60 at the 1976 PGA Championship.

In 1990, Kiefer joined the Senior PGA Tour. Through Monday qualifying and sponsor's exemptions, Kiefer played in enough events in 1992 to finish 32nd on the money list earning him a full-time spot on the Tour in 1993. He had 45 top-10 finishes in Senior PGA Tour events including victories at Ralphs Senior Classic in 1994 and du Maurier Champions in 1997. Kiefer owed the Champions Tour record for consecutive holes at par or better (97), until it was broken by Morris Hatalsky in 2003.

== Personal life ==
Kiefer died of cancer at the age of 59 in Stuart, Florida.

== Awards and honors ==
In 1997, Kiefer was inducted into the New Jersey PGA Hall of Fame.

== Professional wins (6) ==
=== Regular career wins (4) ===
this list may be incomplete

- 1971 Pennsylvania Open Championship
- 1975 New Jersey State Open
- 1976 New Jersey State Open
- 1983 New Jersey State Open

=== Senior PGA Tour wins (2) ===
No.	Date	Tournament	Winning score	Margin of victory	Runner-up
1	Oct 23, 1994	Ralphs Senior Classic	−16 (69-65-63=197)	1 stroke	(United States) Dale Douglass
2	Jun 15, 1997	du Maurier Champions	−15 (65-67-69-68=269)	2 strokes	(United States) Jim Colbert
