= 1923 U.S. Open (golf) =

Coordinates: 40.622°N 73.756°W

Tournament information
- Dates: July 13–15, 1923
- Location: Inwood, New York
- Course: Inwood Country Club
- Organized by: USGA
- Format: Stroke play − 72 holes

Statistics
- Par: 72
- Length: 6,632 yards (6,064 m)
- Field: 77
- Cut: none
- Winner's share: ($500)

Champion
- (United States) Bobby Jones (a)
- 296 (+8), playoff

Location in the United States
Location in New York

The 1923 U.S. Open was the 27th U.S. Open, held July 13–15 at Inwood Country Club in Inwood, New York, a suburb east of New York City on Long Island. Amateur golf legend Bobby Jones, age 21, captured his first career major championship, defeating Bobby Cruickshank by two strokes in an 18-hole Sunday playoff.

Qualifying directly preceded the tournament proper, which was held on Friday and Saturday, 36 holes per day, with no cut.

Jones held a three-stroke lead through 54 holes, but struggled throughout the final round on Saturday afternoon. He bogeyed the first, hit his tee shot out of bounds at the par-3 seventh for a double bogey, hit his second shot on 16 into the parking lot, and then added another bogey at 17. Still with the lead heading to the 18th, Jones made a double-bogey for a round of 76 (+4) and 296 (+8) total. Cruickshank, playing behind Jones, made double bogey at 16 and had to birdie the last to tie Jones; he hit his approach shot to five feet (1.5 m) and made the putt.

During the 18-hole playoff on Sunday, Jones and Cruickshank only halved three of the first 17 holes, but they were all square heading to the 18th. After both players drove into the rough, Cruickshank elected to lay up short of the green, but Jones went for it and hit a 2-iron to 8 feet (2.4 m). After Cruickshank put his third shot into a bunker and fourth to 15 feet (4.6 m), Jones two-putted for the championship.

This was the first of Jones' four U.S. Open titles, a record shared with three others: Willie Anderson, Ben Hogan, and Jack Nicklaus. It was also the first of four playoffs Jones was involved in, winning twice.

== Course layout ==
Hole	1	2	3	4	5	6	7	8	9	Out	10	11	12	13	14	15	16	17	18	In	Total
Yards	343	371	522	530	519	177	223	418	360	3,463	295	421	103	420	497	173	425	405	425	3,169	6,632
Par	4	4	5	5	5	3	3	4	4	37	4	4	3	4	5	3	4	4	4	35	72

== Round summaries ==
=== First round ===
Friday, July 13, 1923 (morning)

Place	Player	Score	To par
1	(United States) Jock Hutchison	70	−2
2	(United States) Bobby Jones (a)	71	−1
3	(United States) Fred Canausa	72	E
T4	(United States) Bill Creavy	73	+1
T4	(Scotland) Bobby Cruickshank	73	+1
T4	(United States) Bill Mehlhorn	73	+1
T7	(United States) Mike Brady	74	+2
T7	(United States) Jack Burke Sr.	74	+2
T7	(England) Cyril Hughes	74	+2
T7	(United States) Willie Ogg	74	+2
T7	(United States) Al Watrous	74	+2

=== Second round ===
Friday, July 13, 1923 (afternoon)

Place	Player	Score	To par
1	(United States) Jock Hutchison	70-72=142	−2
2	(United States) Bobby Jones (a)	71-73=144	E
3	(Scotland) Bobby Cruickshank	73-72=145	+1
T4	(Scotland) Jack Forrester	75-73=148	+4
T4	(Scotland) Francis Gallett	76-72=148	+4
6	(United States) Al Watrous	74-75=149	+5
T7	(England) Cyril Hughes	74-76=150	+6
T7	(United States) Willie Ogg	74-76=150	+6
T9	(United States) Jack Burke Sr.	74-78=152	+8
T9	(United States) Walter Hagen	77-75=152	+8
T9	(United States) Bill Mehlhorn	73-79=152	+8

=== Third round ===
Saturday, July 14, 1923 (morning)

Place	Player	Score	To par
1	(United States) Bobby Jones (a)	71-73-76=220	+4
2	(Scotland) Bobby Cruickshank	73-72-78=223	+7
3	(United States) Jock Hutchison	70-72-82=224	+8
T4	(Scotland) Jack Forrester	75-73-77=225	+9
T4	(Scotland) Francis Gallett	76-72-77=225	+9
T4	(United States) Walter Hagen	77-75-73=225	+9
T4	(United States) Al Watrous	74-75-76=225	+9
8	(United States) Bill Mehlhorn	73-79-75=227	+11
T9	(United States) Johnny Farrell	76-77-75=228	+12
T9	(United States) C.L. Mothersole	77-80-71=228	+12

=== Final round ===
Saturday, July 14, 1923 (afternoon)

Place	Player	Score	To par	Money ($)
T1	(United States) Bobby Jones (a)	71-73-76-76=296	+8	0
T1	(Scotland) Bobby Cruickshank	73-72-78-73=296	+8	500
3	(United States) Jock Hutchison	70-72-82-78=302	+14	300
4	(Scotland) Jack Forrester	75-73-77-78=303	+15	200
T5	(United States) Johnny Farrell	76-77-75-76=304	+16	125
T5	(Scotland) Francis Gallett	76-72-77-79=304	+16	125
T5	(United States) William Reekie (a)	80-74-75-75=304	+16	0
T8	(United States) Leo Diegel	77-77-76-76=306	+18	82
T8	(United States) Bill Mehlhorn	73-79-75-79=306	+18	82
T8	(United States) Al Watrous	74-75-76-81=306	+18	82

(a) denotes amateur

=== Scorecard ===
Final round

Hole	1	2	3	4	5	6	7	8	9	10	11	12	13	14	15	16	17	18
Par	4	4	5	5	5	3	3	4	4	4	4	3	4	5	3	4	4	4
(United States) Jones	+5	+5	+5	+5	+4	+4	+6	+6	+6	+5	+5	+5	+5	+4	+4	+5	+6	+8
(Scotland) Cruickshank	+8	+8	+8	+8	+8	+7	+7	+6	+6	+5	+5	+5	+6	+6	+7	+9	+9	+8

Cumulative tournament scores, relative to par

== Playoff ==
Sunday, July 15, 1923

Place	Player	Score	To par	Money ($)
1	(United States) Bobby Jones (a)	76	+4	0
2	(Scotland) Bobby Cruickshank	78	+6	500

=== Scorecard ===
Hole	1	2	3	4	5	6	7	8	9	10	11	12	13	14	15	16	17	18
Par	4	4	5	5	5	3	3	4	4	4	4	3	4	5	3	4	4	4
(United States) Jones	E	E	E	−1	−1	E	E	E	E	+1	+2	+1	+1	+1	+3	+3	+4	+4
(Scotland) Cruickshank	+1	E	−1	−1	−2	−2	−1	−1	E	+2	+3	+3	+3	+2	+3	+4	+4	+6
