= List of Michigan sports figures =

This is a list of athletes, coaches, managers and officials who were born or raised in the state of Michigan, categorized by their most prominent sport and alphabetized.

== Baseball ==
=== A–L ===
- Jim Abbott, pitcher born with one hand who played for four MLB teams, threw no-hitter for New York Yankees (born in Southfield; raised in Flint)
- Bill Allington, manager of minor-league teams and women's baseball's Rockford Peaches (born in St. Clair County)
- Joe Altobelli, MLB player, manager of 1983 World Series champion Baltimore Orioles (born in Detroit)
- Billy Ashley, outfielder for Los Angeles Dodgers and Boston Red Sox (born in Trenton)
- Paul Assenmacher, pitcher for Cleveland Indians (born in Detroit, played for Aquinas College in Grand Rapids)
- Steve Avery, pitcher for 1995 World Series champion Atlanta Braves (born in Trenton; raised in Taylor)
- Neal Ball, famed for first unassisted triple play in Major League Baseball history (born in Grand Haven)
- Anthony Bass, relief pitcher for Texas Rangers (born in Trenton)
- Duane Below, pitcher for New York Mets (born in Britton)
- Augie Bergamo, outfielder for St. Louis Cardinals in the 1940s (born in Detroit)
- Neil Berry, infielder for Detroit Tigers and Chicago White Sox in 1950s (born in Kalamazoo)
- Mike Bordick, infielder for Oakland A's (born in Marquette)
- Dave Borkowski, relief pitcher for Houston Astros (born in Detroit)
- Steve Boros, infielder, coach, manager for Oakland Athletics (1983–84) and San Diego Padres (1986) and farm system official (born in Flint)
- Frank Bowerman, catcher for several teams (born in Romeo)
- George Brunet, pitcher for nine teams (born in Houghton)
- Bob Buhl, pitcher for Milwaukee Braves, Chicago Cubs and Philadelphia Phillies (born in Saginaw)
- James D. Burns, first owner of Detroit Tigers (born in Springwells district of Detroit)
- Greg Cadaret, relief pitcher for several teams (born in Detroit)
- Count Campau, player and manager (born in Detroit)
- Bill Campbell, pitcher for several MLB teams (born in Highland Park)
- Dave Campbell, infielder and MLB broadcaster (born in Manistee)
- Bernie Carbo, outfielder, famed for pinch-hit, game-tying, three-run homer in 1975 World Series for Cincinnati Reds (born in Detroit)
- Eddie Cicotte, early 20th-century pitcher primarily with Chicago White Sox and Boston Red Sox (born in Springwells)
- Terry Collins, manager for New York Mets (born in Midland)
- Josh Collmenter, relief pitcher for several MLB teams (born in Homer, Michigan)
- Tim Crabtree, pitcher for Toronto Blue Jays (born in Jackson)
- Todd Cruz, infielder for six MLB teams (born in Highland Park)
- Roy Cullenbine, outfielder and first baseman (born in Nashville, Tennessee, raised in Detroit)
- Chad Curtis, outfielder (raised in Middleville; taught in Lake Odessa)
- Kiki Cuyler, Hall of Fame outfielder for several teams (born in Harrisville)
- Dave DeBusschere, pitcher for Chicago White Sox, also pro basketball player (born in Detroit)
- Ike Delock, pitcher for the Boston Red Sox (born in Highland Park)
- Tommy Edman, utility player for the Los Angeles Dodgers (born in Pontiac)
- Wish Egan, MLB player and scout (born in Evart)
- Jim Essian, catcher and Chicago Cubs manager (born in Detroit)
- Bill Fahey, player and coach (born in Detroit)
- Carmen Fanzone, player for Chicago Cubs (born in Detroit)
- Brad Fischer, bench coach for Pittsburgh Pirates (born in Blissfield)
- Ira Flagstead, outfielder primarily with Boston Red Sox (born in Montague)
- Jack Fournier, first baseman, 1924 American League home run leader, 1925 AL leader in walks (born in Au Sable)
- Bill Freehan, five-time Gold Glove-winning catcher for Detroit Tigers (born in Detroit)
- John Ganzel, first baseman and manager (born in Kalamazoo)
- Brent Gates, infielder for several teams (born in Grand Rapids)
- Charlie Gehringer (known as The Mechanical Man), second baseman Hall of Famer for Detroit Tigers (born in Fowlerville)
- Chris Getz, second baseman for Kansas City Royals (born in Southfield; raised in Grosse Pointe)
- Jay Gibbons, outfielder for Baltimore Orioles, batter at plate in film Wedding Crashers (born in Rochester)
- Kirk Gibson, outfielder for Detroit Tigers and Los Angeles Dodgers, manager of Arizona Diamondbacks (born in Pontiac; raised in Waterford)
- Jim Gosger, outfielder for 1969 and 1973 champion New York Mets (born in Port Huron)
- Dolly Gray, early 20th-century pitcher (born in Houghton)
- Ted Gray, All-Star pitcher for Detroit Tigers (born in Detroit)
- Lenny Green, outfielder for several teams (born in Detroit)
- Bobby Grich, four-time Gold Glove-winning second baseman for Baltimore Orioles and California Angels (born in Muskegon)
- Jason Grilli, pitcher for Texas Rangers (born in Royal Oak)
- Steve Gromek, pitcher and member of National Polish-American Hall of Fame (born in Hamtramck)
- Charlie Haeger, pitcher for Seattle Mariners (born in Livonia)
- Jeff Hamilton, third baseman for Los Angeles Dodgers (born in Flint)
- Brad Havens, MLB pitcher for Minnesota Twins (born in Highland Park)
- Charlie Hemphill, early 20th-century outfielder with New York Highlanders and Saint Louis Browns (born in Greenville)
- Pat Hentgen, Cy Young Award-winning pitcher (born in Detroit)
- Ray Herbert, pitcher and 1963 American League shutout leader (born in Detroit)
- Don Hopkins, outfielder for Oakland A's (attended high school in Benton Harbor)
- Art Houtteman, All-Star pitcher for Detroit Tigers and Cleveland Indians (born in Detroit)
- Steve Howe, relief pitcher, primarily with Los Angeles Dodgers and New York Yankees (born in Pontiac)
- Ken Howell, pitcher with Los Angeles Dodgers and Philadelphia Phillies (born in Detroit)
- Clint Hurdle, outfielder for several MLB teams and manager for Pittsburgh Pirates (born in Big Rapids)
- Derek Jeter, 14-time All-Star shortstop for New York Yankees (born in Pequannock, New Jersey; raised in Kalamazoo)
- Alex Johnson, outfielder for California Angels (born in Arkansas, attended Northwestern High School in Detroit)
- Jeff Jones, pitcher for Oakland A's, coach for the Detroit Tigers (born in Detroit)
- Jim Kaat, three-time All-Star pitcher who played primarily for Minnesota Twins, sportscaster for MLB Network (born in Zeeland)
- Scott Kamieniecki, pitcher primarily for New York Yankees (born in Mount Clemens)
- Jim Kern, pitcher for several MLB teams (born in Gladwin)
- Bill Killefer, early 20th-century catcher primarily for Philadelphia Phillies and Chicago Cubs (born in Bloomingdale)
- Red Killefer, early 20th-century infielder for Detroit Tigers, Washington Senators and Cincinnati Reds (born in Bloomingdale)
- Maxine Kline, pitcher in All-American Girls Professional Baseball League (born in North Adams)
- Joe Koppe, infielder for Milwaukee Braves and Los Angeles Angels (born in Detroit)
- Ron Kramer, All-Pro Tight End for Green Bay Packers (raised in East Detroit)
- Bill Lajoie, general manager of 1984 World Series champion Detroit Tigers (born in Wyandotte)
- Hobie Landrith, catcher for several MLB teams (born in Illinois, attended Northwestern High School in Detroit and Michigan State)
- Charley Lau, catcher for Detroit Tigers and hitting coach for many Major League teams (born in Romulus)
- Ron LeFlore, outfielder for Detroit Tigers and Montreal Expos, subject of the movie One in a Million (born in Detroit)
- DJ LeMahieu, second baseman for New York Yankees (attended high school in Bloomfield Township)
- Dick Littlefield, MLB player of 1950s, traded for Jackie Robinson (born in Detroit)
- Stan Lopata, two-time All-Star catcher (born in Delray district of Detroit)
- Derek Lowe, two-time All-Star pitcher (born in Dearborn)

=== M–Z ===
- Duke Maas, pitcher primarily with New York Yankees (born in Utica)
- Larry MacPhail, Hall of Fame executive who introduced night game (at Crosley Field in Cincinnati), chief executive of Reds, Dodgers and Yankees (born in Cass City)
- Mitch Maier, outfielder for Kansas City Royals (born in Petoskey)
- Roger Mason, pitcher for Detroit Tigers (born in Bellaire)
- Charlie Maxwell, left fielder and first baseman for Boston Red Sox and Detroit Tigers, known as "Paw Paw" (born in Lawton)
- John Mayberry, 2-time All-Star first baseman (born in Detroit)
- Steve McCatty, pitcher for Oakland Athletics (raised in Troy)
- John McHale, player, general manager and team president (born in Detroit)
- John McHale Jr., MLB executive (born in Detroit)
- Nate McLouth, outfielder for Baltimore Orioles (born in Muskegon)
- Cass Michaels, infielder for Chicago White Sox (born in Detroit)
- Ed Mierkowicz, outfielder for Detroit Tigers (born in Wyandotte)
- Keith Miller, utility player for New York Mets and Kansas City Royals (born in Midland)
- Jason Motte, pitcher for Chicago Cubs (born in Port Huron)
- Bill Nahorodny, catcher for Chicago White Sox (born in Hamtramck)
- Frank Navin, owner of Detroit Tigers 1908–35 (born in Adrian)
- Hal Newhouser, Hall of Fame pitcher for Detroit Tigers and Cleveland Indians (born in Detroit)
- Jim Northrup, outfielder primarily for Detroit Tigers (born in Breckenridge)
- Frank Oberlin, early 20th-century pitcher for Boston Americans and Washington Senators (born in Elsie)
- Fred Olmstead, early 20th-century pitcher for Chicago White Sox (born in Grand Rapids)
- Scott Olsen, pitcher for Florida Marlins and Washington Nationals (born in Kalamazoo)
- Frank Owen, pitcher with Detroit Tigers and Chicago White Sox (born in Ypsilanti)
- Tom Paciorek, outfielder and first baseman for several major league teams (born in Detroit)
- Dick Pole, pitcher for Boston Red Sox and Seattle Mariners and coach (born in Trout Creek)
- Zach Putnam, pitcher for Chicago White Sox (born in Rochester)
- J. J. Putz, relief pitcher for Arizona Diamondbacks (born in Trenton)
- Earl Rapp, MLB pitcher, Pacific Coast League Hall of Famer (born in Corunna)
- Phil Regan, pitcher for several MLB teams, manager and coach (born in Otsego)
- Frank Reiber, catcher for Detroit Tigers (born in West Virginia, raised in Detroit)
- Merv Rettenmund, 3-time World Series champion outfielder and coach (born in Flint)
- Ed Reulbach, early 20th-century pitcher for Chicago Cubs, best known for all-Chicago 1906 World Series (born in Detroit)
- Dennis Ribant, pitcher for Detroit Tigers (born in Detroit)
- Vern Ruhle, pitcher for Detroit Tigers (born in Coleman)
- Chris Rusin, starting pitcher for Colorado Rockies (born in Detroit)
- Chris Sabo, N.L. Rookie of the Year third baseman for Cincinnati Reds and Baltimore Orioles (born in Detroit)
- Matt Shoemaker, pitcher for Los Angeles Angels of Anaheim (born in Wyandotte)
- Ted Simmons, 8-time All-Star catcher for several teams (born in Highland Park)
- Jim Skaalen, hitting coach for Oakland A's (born in Holland)
- John Smoltz, Hall of Fame pitcher primarily for Atlanta Braves, 1996 Cy Young Award winner (born in Lansing)
- Jim Snyder, MLB player, coach and manager (born in Dearborn)
- Lary Sorensen, pitcher for seven MLB teams (born in Detroit)
- Mike Squires, 1970s Chicago White Sox player (born in Kalamazoo)
- Bill Stein, MLB infielder 1972–1985 (born in Battle Creek)
- Matt Thornton, relief pitcher for Washington Nationals (born in Three Rivers)
- Tom Tresh, 1962 American League Rookie of the Year, infielder and outfielder primarily with New York Yankees (born in Detroit)
- Steve Trout, pitcher primarily for Chicago Cubs (born in Detroit)
- Maurice Van Robays, outfielder for Pittsburgh Pirates in the 1940s (born in Detroit)
- Jason Varitek, 3-time All-Star catcher for Boston Red Sox (born in Rochester)
- Bob Welch, pitcher for Los Angeles Dodgers and Oakland Athletics, 1990 Cy Young Award winner (1990) (born in Detroit)
- Casper Wells, outfielder for Seattle Mariners (born in Grand Rapids)
- Lee Weyer, MLB umpire (born in Imlay City)
- Rick Wise, 2-time All-Star pitcher primarily with Philadelphia Phillies (born in Jackson)
- Connie Wisniewski, pitcher in All-American Girls Professional Baseball League (born in Detroit)
- Tom Yawkey, Hall of Fame owner of Boston Red Sox; also AL vice president (born in Detroit)
- Curt Young, pitcher and coach for Oakland Athletics (born in Saginaw)
- Kevin Young, first baseman in 1990s, primarily for Pittsburgh Pirates (born in Alpena)

== Basketball ==
- B. J. Armstrong (born 1967), point guard during Chicago Bulls dynasty of 1990s (born in Detroit)
- Jamie Arnold, American-Israeli pro power forward (born in Oak Park)
- Sam Balter (1909–1998), Olympic champion basketball forward (born in Detroit)
- Shane Battier (born 1978), forward for Miami Heat, 2-time NBA champion (born in Birmingham)
- Charlie Bell (born 1979), shooting guard for Golden State Warriors (born in Flint)
- Dave Bing, guard primarily for Detroit Pistons, founder of Bing Steel and mayor of Detroit (born in Washington, D.C.; moved to Detroit)
- Marcus Bingham Jr. (born 2000), basketball player for Hapoel Haifa of the Israeli Basketball Premier League (born in Grand Rapids)
- Devin Booker, shooting guard for Phoenix Suns (born in Grand Rapids)
- Don Boven, player and coach for Western Michigan (born in Kalamazoo)
- Jim Boylen, assistant coach for Indiana Pacers (born in East Grand Rapids)
- Mark Brisker, American-Israeli pro guard (born in Detroit)
- P. J. Brown, player for several NBA teams (born in Detroit)
- Bill Buntin, first Detroit Pistons pick of 1965 NBA draft (born in Detroit)
- Franklin Cappon, head coach, Princeton and Michigan (born in Holland)
- Wilson Chandler, player for Denver Nuggets (born in Benton Harbor)
- Bill Chmielewski, 15th overall pick of 1974 NBA draft (born in Detroit)
- Archie Clark, player for University of Minnesota and NBA (lived in Ecorse)
- Mateen Cleaves, player for several NBA teams (born in Flint)
- Will Clyburn (born 1990), professional basketball player, 2016 top scorer in the Israel Basketball Premier League, 2019 EuroLeague Final Four MVP (born in Detroit)
- Fred Cofield, player for New York Knicks and Chicago Bulls (born in Ypsilanti)
- Derrick Coleman, forward primarily with New Jersey Nets and Philadelphia 76ers (born in Alabama but raised in Detroit)
- Jordan Crawford, player for Washington Wizards (born in Detroit)
- Johnny Davis, former NBA player and coach (born in Detroit)
- Dave DeBusschere, member of Basketball Hall of Fame, played with Detroit Pistons and New York Knicks; youngest head coach (at 24) in NBA history (born in Detroit)
- Anna DeForge, WNBA player (born in Iron Mountain)
- David DeJulius (born 1999), point guard for Maccabi Tel Aviv of the Israeli Basketball Premier League (born in Detroit)
- Derrick Dial, player for San Antonio Spurs, Toronto Raptors and Orlando Magic (born in Detroit)
- Chris Douglas-Roberts, shooting guard for Milwaukee Bucks (born in Detroit)
- Brian Dutcher, head coach for San Diego State (born in Alpena)
- Jim Dutcher, head coach for Minnesota and Eastern Michigan (born in Alpena)
- Howard Eisley, point guard, assistant coach for Los Angeles Clippers (born in Detroit)
- James Enright, Basketball Hall of Fame referee, officiated NCAA tournaments (including Final Four and 1948 and 1952 Olympics (born in Sodus)
- Katie Feenstra, WNBA center for Atlanta Dream, former Detroit Shock (born in Grand Rapids)
- Gus Ganakas, basketball coach of East Lansing High School state champions and Michigan State, broadcaster (born in New York, moved to Michigan)
- Derrick Gervin, NBA basketball small forward, 1995 Israeli Basketball Premier League MVP (born in Detroit)
- George Gervin, 9-time NBA All-Star; member of Basketball Hall of Fame (born in Detroit)
- Gail Goestenkors, coach, member of Women's Basketball Hall of Fame (born in Waterford)
- Draymond Green, small forward for 2-time NBA champion Golden State Warriors (born in Saginaw)
- Willie Green, shooting guard for Atlanta Hawks (born in Detroit)
- Paul Griffin, center-forward for San Antonio Spurs (born in Shelby)
- Malik Hairston, shooting guard for San Antonio Spurs (born in Detroit)
- Shaler Halimon, 14th overall pick of 1968 NBA draft (attended high school in Romulus)
- Darvin Ham (born 1973), player with Detroit Pistons and Philippine Basketball Association team, Talk N Text Phone Pals (born in Saginaw)
- Zach Hankins (born 1996), center for Hapoel Jerusalem of the Israeli Basketball Premier League
- Javontae Hawkins (born 1993), player in the Israeli Basketball Premier League (born in Flint)
- Manny Harris, shooting guard for Cleveland Cavaliers (born in Detroit)
- Spencer Haywood, Olympic gold medalist, NBA champion, Hall of Fame (attended high school in Detroit)
- Stan Heath, head coach for University of Arkansas Razorbacks (born in Detroit)
- Al Horford, NBA player for Atlanta Hawks, Boston Celtics (born in Dominican Republic; moved to Grand Ledge)
- Nate Huffman, professional basketball center, 2001 Israeli Basketball Premier League MVP
- Tom Izzo, head coach for Michigan State, 2000 NCAA champion, Basketball Hall of Fame (born in Iron Mountain)
- Jaylen Johnson (born 1996), basketball center / power forward for Hapoel Haifa of the Israeli Basketball Premier League
- Magic Johnson, NCAA, NBA and Olympic champion, member of Basketball Hall of Fame, president of Los Angeles Lakers, part-owner of Los Angeles Dodgers (born in Lansing)
- Neil Johnson, NBA player for New York Knicks (born in Jackson)
- Chris Kaman, center for five NBA teams (born in Grand Rapids)
- Greg Kelser, forward for 1979 NCAA champion Michigan State and NBA player (attended high school in Detroit)
- Danny Lewis (born 1970), American-English basketball player
- Grant Long, player for several teams (born in Wayne)
- John Long, guard for Detroit Pistons (born in Romulus)
- Kalin Lucas (born 1989), point guard in the Israel Basketball Premier League
- Mark Macon, player for Denver Nuggets and Detroit Pistons (born in Saginaw)
- Dan Majerle, guard for Phoenix Suns 1988–2002, 3-time All-Star (born in Cadillac)
- Devyn Marble (born 1992), basketball player for Maccabi Haifa of the Israeli Basketball Premier League
- Kenyon Martin, power forward for five NBA teams (born in Saginaw)
- JaVale McGee, center for 2017 NBA champion Golden State Warriors (born in Flint)
- Pamela McGee, player for USC national champions, Olympic gold medalist (born in Flint)
- Kennedy McIntosh, NBA player (born in Detroit, raised in South Haven)
- Pop McKale, athlete and coach, University of Arizona arena named for him (born in Lansing)
- Terry Mills, member of 1989 Michigan national champions, NBA player for Detroit Pistons (born in Romulus)
- Mark Montgomery, player for Michigan State, head coach at Northern Illinois (raised in Inkster)
- Deanna Nolan, point guard for Detroit Shock, 3-time WNBA champion (born in Flint)
- Marcus Norris (born 1974), basketball player
- Harlan Page, member of Basketball Hall of Fame, University of Chicago coach (born in Watervliet)
- Morris Peterson, player with Oklahoma City Thunder (born in Flint)
- Austin Price (born 1995), point guard in the Israeli Premier Basketball League
- William Reid, player, coach, athletic director for Colgate, NCAA executive, member of Basketball Hall of Fame (born in Detroit, raised in Adrian)
- Glen Rice, member of 1989 Michigan national champions, forward for several NBA teams (born in Flint)
- Jason Richardson, player for five NBA teams (born in Saginaw)
- Jalen Rose, guard for several NBA teams, analyst for ESPN; member of Michigan "Fab Five" (along with Chris Webber, Juwan Howard, Jimmy King and Ray Jackson) (born in Detroit)
- Dan Roundfield, player for four NBA teams, 3-time All-Star (born in Detroit)
- Campy Russell, NBA player with Cleveland Cavaliers (attended high school in Pontiac)
- Walker Russell, NBA player with Detroit Pistons (born in Pontiac)
- Walker Russell Jr., point guard with Detroit Pistons (born in Pontiac)
- Ralph Simpson, 5-time ABA All-Star (born in Detroit)
- Mel Taube, head coach for Purdue (born in Detroit)
- Isiah Thomas, member of Basketball Hall of Fame, point guard for Detroit Pistons 1981–1994, NBA champion 1989, 1990; president of New York Knicks (born in Chicago, lived in Bloomfield Hills)
- Justin Tillman (born 1996), player in the Israeli Basketball Premier League
- Rudy Tomjanovich, 5-time All-Star player, coach of Los Angeles Lakers, 1994 and 1995 NBA champion Houston Rockets (born in Hamtramck)
- Terry Tyler, NBA player for Detroit Pistons, Sacramento Kings (born in Detroit)
- Tyler Ulis, point guard for the Phoenix Suns (born in Southfield)
- Jake Van Tubbergen (born 1998), swingman in the Israeli Basketball Premier League
- Loy Vaught, forward for 1989 NCAA champion Michigan and Los Angeles Clippers (born in Grand Rapids)
- Jay Vincent, forward for 1979 NCAA champion Michigan State, NBA player and coach of Charlotte Bobcats (born in Kalamazoo)
- Sam Vincent, guard for several NBA teams (born in Lansing)
- Chet Walker, forward for Philadelphia 76ers and Chicago Bulls, member of Basketball Hall of Fame (from Benton Harbor)
- Terrence Watson (born 1987), American-Israeli basketball player for Hapoel Eilat of the Israeli Premier League
- Chris Webber, 5-time NBA All-Star power forward for Sacramento Kings, Philadelphia 76ers and Detroit Pistons (born in Detroit)
- Robert Whaley, NBA player (born in Benton Harbor)
- Cassius Winston (born 1998), basketball point guard for Hapoel Jerusalem in the Israeli Basketball Premier League
- James Young, NBA player; 2019–20 top scorer in the Israel Basketball Premier League (born in Flint)

== Boxing ==
- Chris Byrd, former WBO and IBF heavyweight champion, nicknamed "Rapid Fire" (born in Flint)
- Tracy Byrd, boxer (born in Flint)
- Charles Pierce Davey, pro and Olympic boxer, boxing official (born in Michigan)
- Andre Dirrell, super middleweight (born in Flint)
- Anthony Dirrell, super middleweight (born in Flint)
- Eddie Futch, trainer of nine world champions (born in Hillsboro, Mississippi; raised in Detroit)
- Thomas Hearns (aka "The Hit Man" and "Motor City Cobra"), welterweight champion (born in Memphis, Tennessee; moved to Detroit)
- Derrick Jefferson (aka "D-Train"), heavyweight (born in Oak Park)
- Jackie Kallen, boxing's first female manager (born in Detroit)
- Stanley Ketchel (Stanilas Kiecal, aka "The Michigan Assassin"), middleweight champion (born in Grand Rapids)
- George "Kid" Lavigne, world lightweight champion of 1890s (born in Bay City)
- Joe Louis, world heavyweight champion for 12 years, considered by some the best boxer of all time (born in LaFayette, Alabama; moved to Detroit)
- Buster Mathis Jr., heavyweight boxer (born in East Grand Rapids)
- Floyd Mayweather Jr., undefeated five-division champion (born in Grand Rapids)
- Jeff Mayweather, junior-lightweight champion (born in Grand Rapids)
- Roger Mayweather, lightweight champion (born in Grand Rapids)
- Milton McCrory, welterweight champion (born in Detroit)
- Steve McCrory, flyweight, Olympic gold medalist (born in Detroit)
- Bronco McKart, light middleweight champion (born in Monroe)
- Jimmy Paul, lightweight champion (born in Detroit)
- Sugar Ray Robinson, first boxer to win a divisional world championship five times (born in Ailey, Georgia; raised in Detroit)
- Tarick Salmaci, middleweight (born in Dearborn)
- Claressa Shields, first American woman to win Olympic gold medal in boxing, London 2012 (born in Flint)
- Emanuel Steward, trainer of Thomas Hearns, Lennox Lewis and other champions (born in West Virginia; raised in Detroit)
- Duane Thomas, light-heavyweight champion (born in Detroit)
- Pinklon Thomas, heavyweight boxing champion (born in Pontiac)
- Frederick Wedge, boxer and clergyman (born in Mecosta County)
- Ad Wolgast (aka, "The Michigan Wildcat"), early 20th-century lightweight champion (born in Cadillac)

== Football ==
- Anthony Adams, defensive tackle for Chicago Bears (born in Detroit)
- Erik Affholter (born 1966), American football NFL wide receiver (born in Detroit)
- George Allen, Hall of Fame head coach (born in Detroit)
- Hunk Anderson, guard and head coach for Notre Dame, player and head coach for Chicago Bears, coach of Detroit Lions (born in Calumet)
- Fred Arbanas, tight end for Kansas City Chiefs (born in Detroit)
- Jess Atkinson, NFL placekicker (born in Ann Arbor)
- Jason Babin, defensive end for Philadelphia Eagles (Paw Paw)
- Jeff Backus, left tackle for Detroit Lions (born in Midland)
- Alan Ball, cornerback and safety for Dallas Cowboys (born in Detroit)
- Carl Banks, linebacker primarily with New York Giants (born in Flint)
- Joe Barksdale, offensive tackle for Oakland Raiders, Los Angeles Chargers (born in Detroit)
- Terry Barr, halfback for Detroit Lions 1957–65 (born in Grand Rapids)
- Connor Barwin, linebacker for Los Angeles Rams, Philadelphia Eagles (born in Detroit)
- Mike Bass, defensive back for Washington Redskins (born in Ypsilanti)
- Dan Bazuin, defensive end for Houston Texans (born in McBain)
- Joique Bell, running back for Detroit Lions (born in Benton Harbor)
- Ray Bentley, linebacker primarily with Buffalo Bills, including their Super Bowl years (born in Grand Rapids)
- Jerome Bettis ("The Bus"), Hall of Fame running back for Pittsburgh Steelers (born in Detroit)
- Earl Blaik, coach for United States Military Academy and Dartmouth College (born in Detroit)
- Dan Boisture, coach for Eastern Michigan University (born in Detroit)
- Alfonso Boone, defensive end for San Diego Chargers (born in Saginaw)
- Tony Branoff, running back for University of Michigan (born in Flint)
- Chester Brewer, coach, athletic director, Michigan State and Missouri (born in Owosso)
- Omar Brown, free safety for Baltimore Ravens (raised in Berkley)
- Ed Budde, offensive lineman for Kansas City Chiefs (born in Highland Park)
- Brandon Carr, cornerback for Baltimore Ravens (born in Flint)
- George Cartier, quarterback of first Notre Dame team, 1887 (born in Ludington)
- Lynn Chandnois, defensive back and All American at Michigan State (born in Flint)
- Jack Conklin, offensive tackle for Cleveland Browns (born in Plainwell)
- Kirk Cousins, quarterback for Minnesota Vikings (born in Holland)
- Terry Crews, player for Los Angeles Rams, San Diego Chargers, Washington Redskins and Philadelphia Eagles (born in Flint)
- Dan Currie, linebacker for Green Bay Packers and Los Angeles Rams (born in Detroit)
- Lional Dalton, defensive tackle for several NFL teams (born in Detroit)
- Carl Davis, defensive tackle for Baltimore Ravens (born in Detroit)
- Kellen Davis, tight end for Chicago Bears (born in Adrian)
- Bob Devaney, coach for Nebraska, member of College Football Hall of Fame (born in Saginaw)
- Dorne Dibble, wide receiver for Michigan State and 1957 NFL champion Detroit Lions (born in Adrian)
- Dan Dierdorf, lineman, member of Pro Football Hall of Fame (born in Ohio, attended University of Michigan)
- John DiGiorgio, linebacker for Buffalo Bills (born in Shelby Township)
- Gus Dorais, head coach of University of Detroit and Detroit Lions (born in Wisconsin, died in Birmingham)
- T. J. Duckett, running back for Seattle Seahawks (born in Kalamazoo)
- Tony Dungy, coach, won Super Bowl XLI with Indianapolis Colts (born in Jackson)
- Braylon Edwards, wide receiver for several NFL teams (born in Detroit)
- Phil Emery, general manager of Chicago Bears (born in Detroit, raised in Garden City)
- Eric Fisher, offensive tackle for Kansas City Chiefs (born in Rochester)
- Jake Fisher, offensive tackle for Cincinnati Bengals (born in Traverse City)
- Larry Foote, linebacker for Arizona Cardinals (born in Detroit)
- Bennie Fowler III, wide receiver for New York Giants (born in Beverly Hills)
- Eric Fowler, wide receiver for Detroit Lions (born in New Haven)
- Zach Fulton, guard for Kansas City Chiefs (born in Detroit)
- Devin Funchess, wide receiver for Carolina Panthers (born in Farmington Hills)
- John "Frenchy" Fuqua, running back for Pittsburgh Steelers (born in Detroit)
- Adam Gase, head coach of Miami Dolphins (born in Ypsilanti)
- Antonio Gates, tight end for San Diego Chargers (born in Detroit)
- Eric Ghiaciuc, center for Cincinnati Bengals (born in Oxford)
- Vernon Gholston, defensive end for New York Jets (born in Detroit)
- John Gilmore, tight end for New Orleans Saints (born in Marquette)
- George Gipp (aka the "Gipper"), Notre Dame football player immortalized in film by Ronald Reagan) (born in Laurium)
- Kevin Glenn, quarterback in Canadian Football League (born in Detroit)
- Chris Godfrey, former NFL guard, primarily for New York Giants (born in Detroit)
- Paul G. Goebel, college and pro player, Big Ten referee (born in Grand Rapids)
- Ian Gold, linebacker for Denver Broncos (born in Ann Arbor)
- Brandon Graham, defensive end for Philadelphia Eagles (born in Detroit)
- Jonas Gray, running back for Jacksonville Jaguars (born in Pontiac)
- Brock Gutierrez, NFL player, primarily for Detroit Lions (from Charlotte)
- Ra'Shede Hageman, defensive tackle for Atlanta Falcons (born in Lansing)
- Ali Haji-Sheikh, placekicker, primarily for New York Giants (born in Ann Arbor)
- Johnathan Hankins, defensive tackle for New York Giants (born in Dearborn Heights)
- Mike Hankwitz, college player and coach (born in Ludington)
- Jim Harbaugh, head coach for San Francisco 49ers and Michigan (raised in Ann Arbor)
- John Harbaugh, head coach for Baltimore Ravens (raised in Ann Arbor)
- David Harris, linebacker for New York Jets (born in Grand Rapids)
- Jerome Harrison, running back for Detroit Lions (born in Kalamazoo)
- Courtney Hawkins, wide receiver for Tampa Bay Buccaneers (born in Flint)
- Jeff Heath, safety for Dallas Cowboys (born in Lake Orion)
- Drew Henson, quarterback with Dallas Cowboys and Rhein Fire of NFL Europe (born in San Diego, California; raised in Brighton)
- Todd Herremans, offensive lineman for Philadelphia Eagles (born in Ravenna)
- Bill Hewitt, Hall of Fame end for Chicago Bears and Philadelphia Eagles (born in Bay City)
- Rod Hill, NFL defensive back (born in Detroit)
- Gary Hogeboom, NFL quarterback, contestant Survivor: Guatemala (born in Grand Haven)
- Andre Holmes, wide receiver for the Denver Broncos (born in Hillsdale)
- Tommy Hughitt, NFL player and coach (raised in Escanaba)
- Tory Humphrey, tight end for New Orleans Saints (born in Saginaw)
- Mark Ingram Sr., wide receiver of New York Giants (born in Flint)
- Mark Ingram II, 2009 Heisman Trophy winner and running back for New Orleans Saints (born in Flint)
- Jeff Janis, wide receiver for Green Bay Packers (born in Tawas City)
- Jon Jansen, left tackle for Washington Redskins (born in Clawson)
- Cullen Jenkins, defensive tackle for New York Giants (born in Detroit)
- Kris Jenkins, defensive tackle for Carolina Panthers (born in Ypsilanti)
- Greg Jennings, wide receiver for the Miami Dolphins (born in Kalamazoo)
- Pepper Johnson, linebacker and defensive line coach for New England Patriots (born in Detroit)
- Ron Johnson, cornerback, 2-time Super Bowl champion with Pittsburgh Steelers (born in Detroit)
- Brad Jones, linebacker for Philadelphia Eagles (born in Lansing)
- Jason Jones, defensive end for Detroit Lions (born in Detroit)
- Adam Kieft, offensive tackle for Cincinnati Bengals (from Rockford)
- Paul Krause, NFL safety, member of Pro Football Hall of Fame (born in Flint)
- Craig Krenzel, quarterback for Cincinnati Bengals (born in Sterling Heights)
- T. J. Lang, offensive lineman for Green Bay Packers (born in Ferndale)
- Tim Lelito, offensive guard for New Orleans Saints (born in Rochester)
- Jake Long, left tackle for Miami Dolphins (born in Lapeer)
- Dean Look, college and pro quarterback and NFL official (born in Lansing)
- Gary Lowe, defensive back for Detroit Lions (born in Trenton)
- Todd Lyght, cornerback for Los Angeles Rams (attended school in Flint)
- Roy Manning, linebacker for Buffalo Bills (born in Saginaw)
- Chester Marcol, kicker for Green Bay Packers (born in Poland, attended school in Imlay City)
- Steve Mariucci, head coach of San Francisco 49ers and Detroit Lions (born in Iron Mountain)
- Keshawn Martin, wide receiver for Houston Texans (born in Inkster)
- Ruvell Martin, wide receiver for Buffalo Bills (born in Muskegon)
- Derrick Mason, wide receiver for Houston Texans (born in Detroit)
- Tony McGee, 14-season NFL defensive lineman (born in Battle Creek)
- Pete Metzelaars, tight end primarily with Buffalo Bills (born in Three Rivers)
- Jim Miller, quarterback for Chicago Bears (born in Grosse Pointe)
- Earl Morrall, quarterback primarily for Baltimore Colts and Miami Dolphins (born in Muskegon)
- Craig Morton, quarterback for Dallas Cowboys, Denver Broncos and New York Giants (born in Flint)
- Don Morton, head coach, North Dakota State, Tulsa, Wisconsin (born in Flint)
- John Morton, NFL and CFL player, New York Jets offensive coordinator (born in Auburn Hills)
- Howard Mudd, lineman, member of NFL 1960s All-Decade Team and Pro Football Hall of Fame (from Midland)
- Muhsin Muhammad, wide receiver for Chicago Bears (born in Lansing)
- Matt Murphy (2002–2008), tight end (born in Macomb Township)
- Sean Murphy-Bunting, cornerback for Tampa Bay Buccaneers (born in Macomb Township)
- Harry Newman (1909–2000), All-Pro quarterback
- Shantee Orr, linebacker for Cleveland Browns (born in Detroit)
- Calvin Pace, linebacker for New York Jets (born in Detroit)
- Jereme Perry, cornerback for Cleveland Browns (born in Saginaw)
- Nick Perry, linebacker for Green Bay Packers (born in Detroit)
- Geoff Pope, NFL cornerback (born in Detroit)
- Karon Riley, defensive end for Washington Redskins (born in Detroit)
- Andre Rison, wide receiver for several teams (born in Flint)
- Charles Rogers, second overall pick of Detroit Lions (born in Saginaw)
- Gene Ronzani, player for Chicago Bears, head coach for Green Bay Packers (born in Iron Mountain)
- Jon Runyan, NFL offensive tackle (born in Flint)
- Tony Scheffler, tight end for Detroit Lions (born in Morenci)
- Stuart Schweigert, safety for United Football League's Omaha Nighthawks (born in Saginaw)
- Bart Scott, linebacker for New York Jets (born in Detroit)
- Tim Shaw, linebacker for Tennessee Titans (raised in Livonia)
- Bill Sheridan, defensive coordinator for Tampa Bay Buccaneers (born in Detroit)
- Fritz Shurmur, assistant coach for five NFL teams (born in Wyandotte)
- Pat Shurmur, NFL defensive coordinator and head coach of Cleveland Browns (born in Ann Arbor)
- Dion Sims, tight end for Chicago Bears (born in Detroit)
- Dan Skuta, linebacker and fullback for San Francisco 49ers (born in Burton)
- Charlie Smith, tackle for Canton Bulldogs (born in Lansing)
- Mark Smolinski, running back for Baltimore Colts and New York Jets (born in Rogers City)
- Jim Sorgi, quarterback for Super Bowl XLI champion Indianapolis Colts (born in Fraser)
- Joe Staley, offensive tackle for San Francisco 49ers (born in Rockford)
- Drew Stanton, quarterback for Arizona Cardinals (born in Lansing, raised in Okemos)
- Barry Stokes, offensive lineman for NFL teams, including Detroit Lions (born in Flint)
- Chester Taylor, running back for Chicago Bears (born in River Rouge)
- Devin Thomas, wide receiver for Chicago Bears (born in Ann Arbor)
- Tom Tracy, halfback for 1957 NFL champion Detroit Lions (born in Birmingham)
- Torell Troup, nose tackle for Buffalo Bills (born in Detroit)
- Brad Van Pelt, linebacker for several NFL teams (born in Owosso)
- Jared Veldheer, offensive tackle for Arizona Cardinals (born in Grand Rapids)
- Kevin Vickerson, defensive tackle for Denver Broncos (born in Detroit)
- Jim Wacker, head coach, North Dakota State, TCU, Minnesota (born in Detroit)
- Gabe Watson, defensive tackle for Arizona Cardinals (born in Detroit)
- Dave Whitsell, defensive back for Chicago Bears, Detroit Lions (born in Shelby)
- Khari Willis, safety for Indianapolis Colts (born in Jackson)
- LaMarr Woodley, linebacker for Arizona Cardinals (born in Saginaw)
- Roger Zatkoff, linebacker for Green Bay Packers, Detroit Lions (born in Hamtramck)
- Frank Zombo, linebacker for Kansas City Chiefs, Green Bay Packers (born in Sterling Heights)

== Golf ==
- John Barnum, 3-time PGA Seniors' Championship winner (born in Grand Rapids)
- Ryan Brehm, 3-time NCAA champion (born in Mt. Pleasant)
- Walter Burkemo, winner of 1953 PGA Championship (born in Detroit)
- Donna Caponi, LPGA Tour player, 24-time winner, member of World Golf Hall of Fame (born in Detroit)
- Elaine Crosby, LPGA Tour player (born in Birmingham)
- Leo Diegel, two-time PGA Championship winner (born in Gratiot Township)
- Mike Donald, PGA Tour player, 1990 U.S. Open runner-up (born in Grand Rapids)
- Randy Erskine, 5-time Michigan Open champion (raised in Battle Creek)
- Cindy Figg-Currier, LPGA Tour golfer (born in Mt. Pleasant)
- Walter Hagen, iconic golfer, 45-time winner, World Golf Hall of Fame (lived and died in Traverse City)
- Cindy Hill, U.S. Amateur champion and LPGA Tour player (born in South Haven)
- Dave Hill, 13-time PGA Tour winner (born in Jackson)
- Mike Hill, 18-time PGA Senior Tour winner (born in Jackson)
- Lon Hinkle, PGA Tour player (born in Flint)
- Meg Mallon, LPGA player, 2017 inductee in World Golf Hall of Fame (attended high school in Farmington Hills)
- Debbie Massey, LPGA player, 2-time Women's British Open champion (born in Grosse Pointe)
- Calvin Peete, PGA Tour player, 12-time winner, member of Ryder Cup team (born in Detroit)
- Dan Pohl, PGA Tour player, 1982 Masters runner-up (born in Mt. Pleasant)
- Kelly Robbins, LPGA Tour player, 1995 Women's PGA Championship winner (born in Mt. Pleasant)
- Jennifer Song, LPGA Tour player, U.S. Women's Amateur champion (born in Ann Arbor)
- Brian Stuard, PGA Tour player (born in Jackson)
- Kris Tamulis, LPGA Tour player (born in Lapeer)
- Tom Wargo, PGA Tour player (born in Marlette)
- Al Watrous, PGA Tour player and club pro (born in Yonkers, New York, moved to Bloomfield Hills)

== Ice hockey ==
- Justin Abdelkader, forward for NHL's Detroit Red Wings (born in Muskegon)
- Taffy Abel, member and flag-bearer of 1924 Winter Olympics team, NHL player (born in Sault Ste. Marie)
- Jason Bacashihua, goalie for St. Louis Blues (born in Garden City)
- Jim Ballantine, center for several NHL teams (born in Union Lake)
- Jeff Blashill, head coach of the Detroit Red Wings (born in Detroit, raised in Sault Ste. Marie)
- David Booth, winger for Florida Panthers (born in Washington)
- Dan Bylsma, NHL forward and head coach of Pittsburgh Penguins, Buffalo Sabres (born in Grand Haven)
- Jimmy Carson, player for several NHL teams (born in Southfield)
- Shawn Chambers, defenseman for New Jersey Devils (born in Royal Oak)
- Chris Conner, hockey player for Washington Capitals (born in Westland)
- Jim Cummins, player for several NHL teams (born in Dearborn)
- Danny DeKeyser, defenseman for Detroit Red Wings (born in Macomb)
- Tim Gleason, defenseman for Carolina Hurricanes (from Clawson)
- Luke Glendening, center for Detroit Red Wings (born in Grand Rapids)
- Andy Greene, defenseman for New Jersey Devils (born in Trenton)
- Matt Greene, defenseman for Los Angeles Kings (born in Grand Ledge)
- Adam Hall, defenseman for New York Rangers (born in Kalamazoo)
- Derian Hatcher, defenseman for Philadelphia Flyers (born in Sterling Heights)
- Al Iafrate, defenseman for several NHL teams (born in Dearborn)
- Ryan Kesler, player for Anaheim Ducks and in 2010 Winter Olympics (born in Livonia)
- Nate Kiser, ECHL player for South Carolina Stingrays (born in Southgate)
- Mike Knuble, NHL forward (from Kentwood)
- Torey Krug, player for Boston Bruins (born in Royal Oak)
- Pat LaFontaine, center for New York Islanders, Buffalo Sabres, New York Rangers and 1984 U.S. Olympic team (from Waterford)
- Dylan Larkin, center for Detroit Red Wings (born in Waterford)
- Chad LaRose, player for Carolina Hurricanes (born in Fraser)
- Alec Martinez, player and two-time Stanley Cup champion for Los Angeles Kings (born in Rochester)
- Andrew Miller, player for Edmonton Oilers and 2013 NCAA champion Yale (born in Bloomfield Hills)
- Ryan Miller, goaltender for Vancouver Canucks and in 2010 Olympics (born in East Lansing)
- Mike Modano, player for Dallas Stars, inductee in Hockey Hall of Fame (born in Westland)
- Ken Morrow, defenseman for New York Islanders and Miracle on Ice gold medal team at 1980 Olympics (born in Flint)
- David Moss, hockey player for Arizona Coyotes (born in Livonia)
- Tyler Motte, hockey player for Vancouver Canucks (born in St. Clair)
- Lee Norwood, defenseman for several NHL teams including the Detroit Red Wings (raised in Trenton)
- Aaron Palushaj, hockey player (born in Livonia)
- Craig Patrick, Hall of Fame center, coach and general manager (born in Detroit)
- Jeff Petry, defenseman for Montreal Canadiens (born in Ann Arbor)
- Brian Rafalski, defenseman for Detroit Red Wings and 2002, 2004 and 2006 Olympic teams (born in Dearborn)
- Brian Rolston, player for several NHL teams and in 2002 Olympics (born in Flint)
- Brian Rust, winner of Stanley Cup, forward for NHL's Pittsburgh Penguins (born in Pontiac)
- Chris Tancill, hockey player (born in Livonia)
- Matt Taormina, player for New Jersey Devils (born in Warren)
- Tim Thomas, goaltender for 2011 Stanley Cup champion Boston Bruins and in 2010 Winter Olympics (born in Flint)
- John Vanbiesbrouck, goaltender for several NHL teams in the 1980s and 1990s (born in Detroit)
- Don Waddell, defenseman, general manager of Atlanta Thrashers (born in Detroit)
- Doug Weight, 2002 Olympics team silver medalist and winner of Stanley Cup with Carolina Hurricanes (born in Warren)
- James Wisniewski, player for Anaheim Ducks (born in Canton)
- Mike York, forward for New York Islanders and silver-medalist Team USA in 2002 Winter Olympics (born in Waterford)
- John Ziegler, NHL president 1977–1992 (born in Grosse Pointe)
- Jason Zucker, left wing for Minnesota Wild (lived in Ann Arbor)

== Motorcycle racing ==
- Doug Domokos, Motorcycle Hall of Fame inductee, 1970s–1980s stunt motorcyclist nicknamed "Wheelie King" whose wheelie of 145 miles (233 km) held record for 8 years (born in Niles)
- Scott Parker, nine-time AMA Grand National Champion, member of Motorsports Hall of Fame of America (from Flint)
- Dot Robinson, women's racing pioneer, co-founder of Motor Maids, Motorcycle Hall of Fame inductee (born in Australia; settled in Saginaw)
- Jay Springsteen, Motorcycle Hall of Fame inductee, three-time AMA Grand National Champion (born in Flint)
- Jeff Stanton, 6-time AMA Motocross and Supercross Champion, Motorcycle Hall of Fame inductee (born in Coldwater)

== Olympics ==
- Avery Brundage, International Olympic Committee president 1952–72 (born in Detroit)
- Richard Callaghan, Olympic figure skating coach (lives in Detroit)
- Henry Carr, double gold medalist in track at Tokyo 1964 Summer Olympics (born in Detroit)
- Rex Cawley, gold medalist in 400 meter hurdles at Tokyo 1964 Summer Olympics (born in Farmington)
- Ralph Craig, gold medalist in 100 and 200 sprints at Stockholm 1912 Olympic Games (born in Detroit)
- Jim Cristy, swimmer, bronze medalist in Los Angeles 1932 Summer Olympics 1,500-meter freestyle (born in Detroit)
- Richard Dalley, figure skater, fifth place in ice dancing at Sarajevo 1984 Winter Olympics (born in Detroit)
- Meryl Davis, gold medalist in ice dancing at Sochi 2014 Winter Olympics (from West Bloomfield)
- Dick Degener, gold medalist in diving at Berlin 1936 Summer Olympics (born in Birmingham)
- Brian Diemer, bronze medalist in steeplechase at Los Angeles 1984 Olympics (born in Grand Rapids)
- Andre Dirrell, middleweight boxing bronze medalist at Athens 2004 Olympics (born in Flint)
- Ken Doherty, decathlon bronze medalist in 1928 Summer Olympics (born in Detroit)
- Jeff Farrell, swimmer, two-time gold medalist at Rome 1960 Summer Olympics (born in Detroit)
- Carol Fox, figure skater, fifth place in ice dancing at Sarajevo 1984 Winter Olympics (born in Ypsilanti)
- Steve Fraser, gold medalist in Greco-Roman wrestling at Los Angeles 1984 Olympics (born in Hazel Park)
- Cynthia Goyette, swimmer, gold medalist in Tokyo 1964 Summer Olympics (born in Detroit)
- Alex Izykowski, speed skater, bronze medalist in 5,000 meter relay at Turin 2006 Olympics (born in Bay City)
- Hayes Jones, gold medalist in 110-meter hurdles at Tokyo 1964 Summer Olympics (born in Starkville, Mississippi; raised in Pontiac)
- Micki King, diver, Olympic gold medalist and 10-time national champion (born in Pontiac)
- Karch Kiraly, volleyball player, three-time Olympic gold medalist, only person to win Olympic gold in both indoor volleyball (at both Los Angeles 1984 Olympics and Seoul 1988 Olympics) and in beach volleyball (at 1996 Atlanta Olympics) (born in Jackson)
- Shelley Looney, member of gold medal-winning women's hockey team at Nagano 1998 Olympics (born in Trenton)
- Steve McCrory, gold medalist in flyweight boxing at Los Angeles 1984 Olympics (born in Detroit)
- Art McKinlay, rowing, silver medalist at Melbourne 1956 Summer Olympics (born in Detroit)
- John McKinlay, rowing, two-time Olympian, silver medalist at 1956 Summer Olympics (born in Detroit)
- Carly Piper, swimmer, member of gold medal-winning U.S. women's 4x200 freestyle relay at Athens 2004 Summer Olympics (born in Grosse Pointe)
- William Porter, Olympic gold medalist in 110 meter hurdles at London 1948 Summer Olympics (born in Essex Township)
- Jean Racine, Bobsleigh, competed in the two-woman event at the 2002 Winter Olympics and the 2006 Winter Olympics (born in Waterford)
- Dathan Ritzenhein, marathon qualifier for 2008 Beijing Olympics (born in Grand Rapids)
- Norbert Schemansky, only weightlifter to win four Olympic medals — 1948 silver; 1952 gold; 1960 bronze; and 1964 bronze—and 3-time world champion (born in Detroit; lived in Dearborn)
- Allison Schmitt, swimmer, four-time Olympian and eight-time Olympic medalist (raised in Canton)
- Clark Scholes, swimmer, Olympic gold medalist in 100 meter freestyle at Helsinki 1952 Summer Olympics (born in Detroit)
- Jackson Scholz, athlete, Olympic gold medalist in track and field in 1920 and 1924 (born in Buchanan)

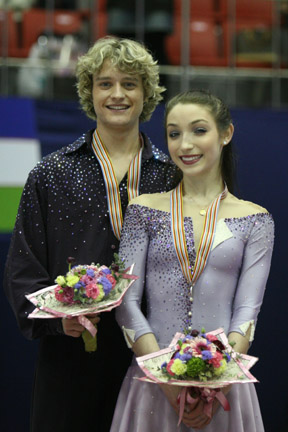
Charlie White, Meryl Davis

- Sheila Taormina, four-time Olympian in three sports (swimming, triathlon, modern pentathlon), gold medalist in 1996 Atlanta Olympics swim relay (born in Livonia)
- Lindsay Tarpley, soccer player, member of gold-medal Athens 2004 Summer Olympics team (was attending Western Michigan) (born in Madison, Wisconsin, raised in Kalamazoo)
- Gary Tobian, diver, Olympic gold and two-time silver medalist (born in Detroit)
- Eddie Tolan, double Olympic gold medalist in track in 100 and 200 meter sprint at Los Angeles 1932 Summer Olympics, first black athlete to win two Olympic golds (born in Denver, Colorado; raised in Detroit)
- Peter Vanderkaay, swimmer, member of gold medal-winning US men's 4x200 freestyle relay at Athens 2004 Summer Olympics (born in Rochester)
- Quincy Watts, track-and-field gold medalist at Barcelona 1992 Summer Olympics (born in Detroit)
- Mark Wells, member of Miracle on Ice gold medal hockey team at Lake Placid 1980 Olympics (born in Saint Claire Shores)
- Charlie White, ice dancer, Sochi 2014 Winter Olympics gold medalist (born in Royal Oak)
- Sharon Wichman, swimmer, Mexico City 1968 Summer Olympics gold medalist, 200 breaststroke (born in Detroit)
- Jordyn Wieber, artistic gymnast at London 2012 Summer Olympics (born in DeWitt)
- Margaret Woodbridge, swimmer, gold medalist at Antwerp 1920 Olympic Games (born in Detroit)
- Lorenzo Wright, gold medalist in 440-meter relay at London 1948 Summer Olympics (born in Detroit)
- Wendy Wyland, bronze medalist in platform diving at Los Angeles 1984 Olympics (born in Jackson)
- Sheila Young, skater, first American to win three medals in winter games—bronze, silver, gold—at 1976 Olympics (born in Birmingham)

== Professional wrestling ==
- Eric Bischoff, promoter and former World Championship Wrestling president (born in Detroit)
- Monty Brown, professional wrestler, originally a linebacker for the Buffalo Bills (born in Bridgeport)
- Ed Farhat (aka The Original Sheik), professional wrestler (born in Lansing)
- Jimmy Jacobs (Chris Scoville) professional wrestler (born in Grand Rapids)
- Kevin Nash, professional wrestler (born in Detroit)
- Rhino (Terry Gerin), professional wrestler (born in Detroit)
- Bob Roop, Greco-Roman wrestling participant at the Tokyo 1964 Summer Olympics, turned pro as "The Gladiator" and "The Enforcer" (born in Blacksburg, Virginia; raised in East Lansing)
- Chris Sabin (aka Josh Harter), professional wrestler (born in Detroit)
- Sabu (Terry Brunk), professional wrestler (born in Detroit)
- Dan Severn, mixed martial artist and professional wrestler (born in Coldwater)
- Alex Shelley, professional wrestler (born in Detroit)
- Sgt. Slaughter (Robert Remus), professional wrestler (born in Detroit)
- Sosay (Jennifer E. Kaiser), professional wrestler (born in Plainwell, Michigan)
- George "The Animal" Steele, professional wrestler (born in Detroit)
- Rick Steiner, professional wrestler (born in Bay City)
- Scott Steiner, professional wrestler (born in Bay City)
- Lou Thesz, professional wrestling pioneer and champion (born in Banat)
- Rob Van Dam, professional wrestler (born in Battle Creek)

== Soccer ==
- Jordan Gruber (born 1983), American-Israeli soccer player
- Alexi Lalas, US National Soccer Hall of Fame player, general manager of Los Angeles Galaxy (born in Birmingham)
- Kate Markgraf, NCAA, World Cup and two-time Olympic champion soccer player (born in Bloomfield Hills)

== Tennis ==
- Jane "Peaches" Bartkowicz, tennis player, U.S. Open quarter-finalist (born in Hamtramck)
- Lisa Bonder, tennis player, ranked as high as 9th in the world (born in Beverly Hills, California, raised in Saline)
- Luke Jensen, tennis player, winner of 1993 French Open doubles (born in Grayling)
- Murphy Jensen, tennis player, winner of 1993 French Open doubles (born in Ludington)
- Fred Kovaleski, tennis player, member of 2 NCAA Championships at William and Mary (grew up in Hamtramck)
- Aaron Krickstein, tennis player, ranked as high as 6th in world (born in Ann Arbor)
- Todd Martin, tennis player, US Open and Australian Open finalist, ranked as high as #4 in the world (born in Hinsdale, Illinois, raised in East Lansing)
- Susan Mascarin, tennis player, winner of girls' singles at 1980 US Open (born in Grosse Pointe Shores)
- Michael Russell, tennis player (born in Detroit)
- Serena Williams, tennis player, winner of dozens of Grand Slam titles, including 23 in singles; world's No. 1 ranking; winner of four Olympic gold medals (born in Saginaw)

== Other sports ==
- Scott Baker, auto racer (born in Holland)
- Johnny Benson Jr., NASCAR driver (born in Grand Rapids)
- Pam Bristol Brady, Triple Crown-winning badminton player (born in Flint; moved to Grand Blanc)
- Becky Breisch, 2005 USA Outdoors discus throw champion and 8-time NCAA All-American (born in Edwardsburg)
- Bob Burman, auto racer, drove in first Indianapolis 500 (born in Imlay City)
- Frances Dodge, horsewoman, thoroughbred breeder and owner (born in Detroit)
- Allie Dragoo, professional cyclist, USA Cycling, Cervelo Pro Cycling (born in Grand Rapids)
- Tim Fedewa, NASCAR driver and spotter (born in Holt)
- Gordon Johncock, auto racer, two-time winner of Indianapolis 500 (born in Coldwater)
- Erik Jones, NASCAR driver, 2015 NASCAR Camping World Truck Series Champion (born in Byron)
- Jessica Joseph, ice dancer, silver and bronze medalist in 1998 and 2001 US Championships, respectively (born in Bloomfield Hills)
- Connie Kalitta, drag racer, first driver to hit 200 mph (320 km/h) at a NHRA sanctioned event in top fuel dragster (grew up in Mount Clemens)
- Doug Kalitta, auto racer, 1994 USAC National Sprint Car champion (born in Ypsilanti)
- Brad Keselowski, NASCAR driver with 34 victories in the NASCAR Cup Series, 2012 NASCAR Sprint Cup Champion (born in Rochester Hills)
- Byron Krieger (1920–2015), Olympic fencer
- Julie Krone, jockey, first woman to win Belmont Stakes, all-time leading female rider in victories (born in Benton Harbor)
- Iris Kyle, 10-time overall Ms. Olympia professional bodybuilder (born in Benton Harbor)
- Marion Ladewig, nine-time Bowler of the Year from 1950 to 1963, Women's International Bowling Congress Hall of Fame (born in Grand Rapids)
- Harry Melling, owner of Melling Automotive, NASCAR championship team owner of Melling Racing (lived in Jackson)
- Greg Meyer, distance runner, winner of 1983 Boston Marathon (born in Grand Rapids)
- Bill Muncey, hydroplane racing champion (born in Detroit)
- Lenda Murray, IFBB professional bodybuilder, multiple Ms. Olympia winner (born in Detroit)
- Colette Nelson, IFBB professional bodybuilder (born in Southfield)
- Benny Parsons, NASCAR Winston Cup Series champion, TV commentator (lived in Detroit)
- U. E. Patrick, aka "Pat" Patrick, co-founder of CART Indy car series, owner of Indy 500 winning Patrick Racing (resides in Jackson)
- Ken Read, Alpine skier, first North American to win an Alpine skiing World Cup downhill skiing event, in 1975 for Canada (born in Ann Arbor)
- Isabel Dodge Sloane, owned Kentucky Derby, Preakness and Belmont champion horses (born in Detroit)
- Herbert J. Thompson, thoroughbred trainer, 4-time Kentucky Derby winner (born in Detroit)
- Allen Tolmich, hurdler, world record setter, 4-time AAU national champion (born in Detroit)
- Kevin VanDam, professional bass angler, author of guide Secrets of a Champion, 2002 ESPN Outdoor Sportsman of the Year (born in Kalamazoo)
- Dave Walsh, gamer (born in Grand Rapids)
- Ken Westerfield, Frisbee flying disc pioneer (born in Detroit)
- Bill Winfrey, trainer of Native Dancer, member of Racing Hall of Fame (born in Detroit)
- Garfield Wood, boat builder, 5-time Gold Cup hydroplane champion (born in Iowa, moved to Detroit)

== References and further reading ==
- Gavrilovich, Peter and Bill McGraw (2000). The Detroit Almanac. Detroit Free Press. ISBN 0-937247-34-0.
- Gavrilovich, Peter and Bill McGraw (2006). The Detroit Almanac, 2nd edition. Detroit Free Press. ISBN 978-0-937247-48-8.
