= New York Open =

New York Open may refer to:

- New York Open (tennis), ATP World Tour event
- Bellevue Country Club Open, also entitled the New York State Open, PGA Tour-level event in 1920 and 1921
- New York State Open (1920s event), PGA Tour-level event from 1928 to 1930
- New York State Open, contemporary state open

== See also ==
- Open New York
