= 1926 PGA Championship =

Coordinates: 40.735°N 73.574°W

Tournament information
- Dates: September 20–25, 1926
- Location: East Meadow, New York
- Course: Salisbury Golf Club
- Organized by: PGA of America
- Tour: PGA Tour
- Format: Match play - 5 rounds

Statistics
- Par: 72
- Field: 65 players, 32 to match play
- Cut: 155 (+11), playoff
- Prize fund: $11,100

Champion
- (United States) Walter Hagen
- def. Leo Diegel, 5 and 3

Location in the United States
Location in New York

The 1926 PGA Championship was the ninth PGA Championship, held September 20–25 at Salisbury Golf Club on Long Island in East Meadow, New York. Then a match play championship, Walter Hagen defeated Leo Diegel 5 and 3 in the finals to win his third consecutive PGA Championship, his fourth overall, and the eighth of his eleven major titles.

The victory ran Hagen's match record at the PGA Championship in the 1920s to 25–1 (.962), falling only to Gene Sarazen in 38 holes in the 1923 finals. With his third consecutive title, his winning streak stood at fifteen matches. Hagen was also the medalist in the 36-hole qualifier on Monday at 140 (−4). Through 2013, he remains the only winner of three consecutive PGA Championships.

Hagen won the following year in 1927 for his fourth consecutive title, but Diegel stopped the streak in 1928 and repeated in 1929. In both years, Diegel defeated both Hagen and Gene Sarazen, the only winners of the title from 1921 through 1927, in the quarterfinals and semifinals. Hagen had previously stopped Diegel in the 1925 quarterfinals in 40 holes.

Devereux Emmet designed the course in 1914. The 90-hole Salisbury Golf Club ran into financial difficulty during the 1930s and its land was acquired by Nassau County. Originally "Nassau County Park at Salisbury" in 1944, it was renamed Eisenhower Park in 1969. The 1926 venue presently exists as the Red Course.

== Format ==
The match play format at the PGA Championship in 1926 called for 12 rounds (216 holes) in six days:

- Monday – 36-hole stroke play qualifier
  - top 32 professionals advanced to match play
- Tuesday – first round – 36 holes
- Wednesday – second round – 36 holes
- Thursday – quarterfinals – 36 holes
- Friday – semifinals – 36 holes
- Saturday – final – 36 holes

== Final results ==
Saturday, September 25, 1926

Place	Player
1	(United States) Walter Hagen
2	(United States) Leo Diegel
T3	(United States) Johnny Farrell
T3	(United States) Johnny Golden
T5	(United States) George Christ
T5	(Republic of Ireland) Pat Doyle
T5	(United States) Abe Espinosa
T5	(United States) Harry Hampton

== Final eight bracket ==
Quarter-finals; September 23
Walter Hagen	6&5
Pat Doyle
Johnny Farrell	3&1
Harry Hampton
Leo Diegel	3&2
Abe Espinosa
Johnny Golden	7&6
George Christ

Semi-finals; September 24
Walter Hagen	6&5
Johnny Farrell
Leo Diegel	1up
Johnny Golden

Finals; September 25
Walter Hagen	4&3
Leo Diegel
