= James Ballantyne (disambiguation) =

James Ballantyne (1772–1833) was a Scottish editor and publisher.

James Ballantyne or Ballantine may also refer to:

- James R. Ballantyne (1813–1864), Scottish orientalist
- James Simpson Ballantyne, Canadian politician
- James Ballantine (politician) (1855–1896), New York politician
- James Ballantine (1806–1877), Scottish artist and author
- James W. Ballantine (1839–1907), American politician and merchant
- James Ballantine (military officer) (1876–1948), Canadian veteran of both the Second Boer War and World War I
- Jim Ballantyne, chairman of Airdrie United
- Jim Ballantine (producer) (born 1955), American film producer
- Jim Ballantine (ice hockey) (1967–2002), American ice hockey player

== See also ==
- James Ballantyne Hannay (1855–1931), Scottish chemist
