= 1927 PGA Championship =

Coordinates: 32.722°N 96.797°W

Tournament information
- Dates: October 31 – November 5, 1927
- Location: Dallas, Texas
- Course: Cedar Crest Country Club
- Organized by: PGA of America
- Tour: PGA Tour
- Format: Match play - 5 rounds

Statistics
- Par: 71
- Field: 63 players, 32 to match play
- Cut: 154 (+12), playoff
- Prize fund: $15,441

Champion
- (United States) Walter Hagen
- def. Joe Turnesa, 1 up

Location in the United States
Location in Texas

The 1927 PGA Championship was the 10th PGA Championship, held from October 31 to November 5 in Texas at Cedar Crest Country Club in Dallas. Then a match play championship, Walter Hagen defeated Joe Turnesa 1 up in the finals to win his fourth consecutive PGA Championship, his fifth and final overall, and the ninth of his eleven major titles.

The victory ran Hagen's match record at the PGA Championship in the 1920s to 30–1 (.968), falling only to Gene Sarazen in 38 holes in the 1923 finals. With his fourth consecutive title, his winning streak stood at twenty matches. Hagen, age 34, was also the medalist in the 36-hole qualifier on Monday at 141 (−1).

The course, south of downtown Dallas, was designed by A. W. Tillinghast and opened in 1919. It hosted the Dallas Open less than two years earlier in January 1926, won by Macdonald Smith. The country club closed in 1929 and the course was purchased by the City of Dallas in 1946 and it continues as a public facility.

At the time, this was the furthest west and south that a major championship had been held. The western limit had been Illinois for multiple majors, and the southernmost venues had been Indiana for the PGA Championship in 1924 and Maryland for the U.S. Open in 1921. Two years later in 1929, the PGA Championship was played in Los Angeles, California.

== Format ==
The match play format at the PGA Championship in 1927 called for 12 rounds (216 holes) in six days:

- Monday – 36-hole stroke play qualifier
  - top 32 professionals advanced to match play
- Tuesday – first round – 36 holes
- Wednesday – second round – 36 holes
- Thursday – quarterfinals – 36 holes
- Friday – semifinals – 36 holes
- Saturday – final – 36 holes

== Final results ==
Saturday, November 5, 1927

Place	Player
1	(United States) Walter Hagen
2	(United States) Joe Turnesa
T3	(United States) Al Espinosa
T3	(United States) Johnny Golden
T5	(United States) Tommy Armour
T5	(United States) Mortie Dutra
T5	(United States) Francis Gallett
T5	(United States) Gene Sarazen

== Final eight bracket ==
Quarter-finals; November 3
Walter Hagen	4&3
Tommy Armour
Al Espinosa	1up
Mortie Dutra
Joe Turnesa	3&2
Gene Sarazen
Johnny Golden	4&2
Francis Gallett

Semi-finals; November 4
Walter Hagen	1up
Al Espinosa
Joe Turnesa	7&6
Johnny Golden

Finals; November 5
Walter Hagen	1up
Joe Turnesa
