= Pat Doyle (golfer) =

Irish professional golfer (1889–1971)

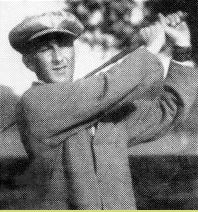

Personal information
- Full name: Patrick Joseph Doyle
- Nickname: Smilin' Irishman
- Nationality: Ireland
- Born: 10 March 1889 Kindlestown Upper, County Wicklow, Ireland
- Died: 29 March 1971 (aged 82) Mount Vernon, New York, U.S.
- Spouse: Catherine Doyle

Career
- Sport: Golf
- Turned professional: 1908
- Former tour: PGA Tour
- Professional wins: 2

Number of wins by tour
- PGA Tour: 1
- Other: 1

Best results in major championships
- Masters Tournament: DNP
- PGA Championship: T5: 1926
- U.S. Open: DNP
- The Open Championship: 10th: 1913

Patrick Joseph Doyle (10 March 1889 – 29 March 1971) was an Irish-born professional golfer who played primarily in the United States. Doyle finished in tenth place in the 1913 U.S. Open.

== Early life ==
Patrick Doyle was born in Kindlestown Upper, County Wicklow, Ireland, outside of Dublin.

== Professional career ==
Early in his career, Doyle worked at several golf clubs in Ireland. Doyle came to the United States in 1908. He would occasionally return to Ireland and finished second at the 1912 Irish PGA Championship. However, he primarily played in the United States. At the 1913 U.S. Open, Doyle finished in tenth place, carding rounds of 78-80-73-80=311. He won $30 as his share of the purse. However, Doyle ultimately became a naturalized American citizen in 1914.

Doyle worked at various golf clubs including Myopia Hunt Club in South Hamilton, Massachusetts. He also worked at a number of clubs in the tri-state area including South Shore Field Club, Deal Golf & Country Club, Elmsford Country Club, and Linwood Country Club. Doyle won one event on the PGA Tour, the 1918 Jacksonville Open. That year he also won the Philadelphia Open Championship, sharing the title with Englishman Arthur Reid.

Doyle was a frequent competitor in the PGA Championship. He posted particularly good results in the 1926 and 1928 PGA Championships. In the 1926 tournament, he lost to Walter Hagen by the score of 6 and 5 in the quarter-finals.

== Death ==
Doyle died on 29 March 1971 at Mount Vernon, New York, aged 82.

== Professional wins (2) ==
=== PGA Tour wins (1) ===
- 1918 Jacksonville Open

=== Other wins (1) ===
- 1918 Philadelphia Open Championship (tied with Arthur Reid)

== Results in major championships ==
| Tournament | 1913 | 1914 | 1915 | 1916 | 1917 | 1918 | 1919 | 1920 | 1921 | 1922 | 1923 | 1924 | 1925 | 1926 | 1927 | 1928 |
|---|---|---|---|---|---|---|---|---|---|---|---|---|---|---|---|---|
| U.S. Open | 10 | ? | ? | ? | NT | NT | T18 | T43 | ? | ? | ? | WD | T34 | T53 | CUT | ? |
| PGA Championship | NYF | | | | NT | NT | | R32 | R32 | | R64 | | | QF | | R16 |

Note: Doyle never played in the Masters Tournament or The Open Championship.

Top 10
Did not play

NYF = tournament not yet founded
NT = no tournament
R64, R32, R16, QF = round in which player lost in PGA Championship match play
? = unknown finish
"T" indicates a tie for a place
