= 1925 PGA Championship =

Coordinates: 41.521°N 87.687°W

Tournament information
- Dates: September 21–26, 1925
- Location: Olympia Fields, Illinois
- Course(s): Olympia Fields Country Club; Courses 3 and 4
- Organized by: PGA of America
- Tour: PGA Tour
- Format: Match play - 5 rounds

Statistics
- Par: 70
- Length: 6,448 yards (5,896 m); 6,490 yards (5,934 m)
- Field: 67 players, 32 to match play
- Cut: 157 (+17)
- Prize fund: $6,330

Champion
- (United States) Walter Hagen
- def. Bill Mehlhorn, 6 and 5

Location in the United States
Location in Illinois

The 1925 PGA Championship was the eighth PGA Championship, held September 21–26 at Olympia Fields Country Club in Olympia Fields, Illinois, a suburb south of Chicago. Then a match play championship, defending champion Walter Hagen defeated Bill Mehlhorn 6 and 5 in the finals on Courses 3 and 4 to win his second consecutive PGA Championship, his third overall, and the seventh of his eleven major titles.

The victory ran Hagen's match record at the PGA Championship in the 1920s to 20–1 (.952), falling only to Gene Sarazen in 38 holes in the 1923 finals. With his second consecutive title, his winning streak stood at ten matches. This was the second of four consecutive PGA Championships for Hagen; through 2013, no other player was won more than two consecutive titles.

Hagen had close calls in this event; his first round match with low qualifier Al Watrous went to 39 holes and the quarterfinal match with future two-time champion Leo Diegel went to 40 holes after Diegel built an early lead. Hagen defeated Diegel the following year in the finals, then Diegel beat Hagen on the way to his two titles in 1928 and 1929.

The four 18-hole courses at Olympia Fields were reduced to two in the 1940s when the club sold half of its property. Course No. 4 became the North course, and the South course is a composite of holes form the other three.

== Format ==
The match play format at the PGA Championship in 1925 called for 12 rounds (216 holes) in six days:

- Monday – 36-hole stroke play qualifier
  - top 32 professionals advanced to match play
- Tuesday – first round – 36 holes
- Wednesday – second round – 36 holes
- Thursday – quarterfinals – 36 holes
- Friday – semifinals – 36 holes
- Saturday – final – 36 holes

== Final results ==
Saturday, September 26, 1925

Place	Player
1	(United States) Walter Hagen
2	(United States) Bill Mehlhorn
T3	(United States) Harry Cooper
T3	(United States) Mortie Dutra
T5	(United States) Tommy Armour
T5	(United States) Leo Diegel
T5	(United States) Johnny Farrell
T5	(United States) Tom Kerrigan

== Final eight bracket ==
Quarter-finals; September 24
Walter Hagen	40h
Leo Diegel
Harry Cooper	2&1
Johnny Farrell
Bill Mehlhorn	7&6
Tom Kerrigan
Mortie Dutra	2up
Tommy Armour

Semi-finals; September 25
Walter Hagen	3&1
Harry Cooper
Bill Mehlhorn	8&6
Mortie Dutra

Finals; September 26
Walter Hagen	6&5
Bill Mehlhorn
