= Cedar Crest Park =

Golf course in Dallas, Texas

Cedar Crest Golf Course
- Location in the United States Location in Texas
- 32.722°N 96.797°W

Club information
- Location: Dallas, Texas, U.S.
- Established: 1919, 107 years ago 1946 (city)
- Type: Public
- Owner: City of Dallas
- Total holes: 18
- Tournaments: PGA Championship (1927); Dallas Open (1926)
- Website: golfcedarcrest.com
- Designed by: A. W. Tillinghast (1919); D. A. Weibring (2004)
- Par: 70
- Length: 6,532 yards (5,973 m)
- Course rating: 73.2
- Slope rating: 131

Cedar Crest Golf Course, formerly Cedar Crest Country Club, is a public golf course in the southern United States, located in Dallas, Texas. South of downtown in the Cedar Crest neighborhood, the course was designed by A. W. Tillinghast and was the site of the tenth PGA Championship in 1927, won by Walter Hagen in early November. It was his fourth consecutive PGA title and fifth overall, the ninth of his eleven major championships. Cedar Crest also hosted the Dallas Open in 1926, won by Macdonald Smith in late January.

Established in 1916 and opened 107 years ago in 1919, the course is where a young Harry Cooper (1904–2000) honed his skills. The country club was closed in 1929, changed ownership, and then was purchased by the city in 1946. It hosted the United Golf Association Negro National Open in 1954, and the USGA's Public Links later that year.

A new $2 million clubhouse was built in 2001. In 2004, the course was renovated in by D. A. Weibring and Steve Wolfard.

From the back tees, it plays as a par-70 at 6,532 yards (5,973 m), with a course rating of 73.2 and a slope rating of 131.
