= Long Beach Open =

Golf tournament formerly on the PGA Tour

The Long Beach Open was a golf tournament on the PGA Tour. It was held in Long Beach, California at the Virginia Country Club from 1926 to 1930 and at the Lakewood Country Club from 1949 to 1951.

In 1957, the Long Beach Open was a PGA Satellite Event. At this event, Charlie Sifford became the first African-American golfer to enter and win against white players in a PGA co-sponsored tournament.

In 1989, a revived Long Beach Open came to the El Dorado and Recreation Park golf courses. Since 2006, Skylinks has been on pre-cut rotation, replacing Recreation Park.

Troy Grant at the age of 15 is the youngest ever to qualify and make the pro cut.

== Winners ==
Long Beach Open (Long Beach Golf Festival)

- 2024 Aaron Grimes
- 2023 Charles Porter
- 2022 Michael Visacki
- 2020–21 No tournament
- 2019 Taylor Montgomery
- 2018 Jered Stone
- 2017 Bryan Martin
- 2016 Garrett Sapp
- 2015 Greg Bruckner
- 2014 Eric Meichtry
- 2013 Berry Henson
- 2012 Hyun Seok Lim
- 2011 Eric Meichtry
- 2010 Vincent Johnson
- 2009 Tyrone van Aswegen
- 2008 Ted Oh
- 2007 Todd Vernon
- 2006 Mike Cunning
- 2005 Peter Tomasulo
- 2004 Steve Schneiter
- 2003 David Oh
- 2002 Kevin Na
- 2001 Doug Garwood
- 2000 Todd Fischer
- 1999 Jeff Sanday
- 1998 Todd Fischer
- 1997 Bob Burns
- 1996 Dennis Paulson
- 1995 Jeff Bloom
- 1994 Scott McCarron
- 1993 Curtis Worley
- 1992 Scott Medlin
- 1991 Steve Jurgensen
- 1990 Paul Goydos
- 1989 John Mason
- 1958–1988 No tournament

Long Beach Open (Satellite Tour)

- 1957 Charlie Sifford
- 1952–1956 No tournament

Lakewood Park Open

- 1951 Cary Middlecoff

Long Beach Open

- 1950 Fred Haas
- 1949 Ben Hogan
- 1931–1948 No tournament
- 1930 Joe Kirkwood, Sr. and Olin Dutra (tie)
- 1928 (Dec.) Walter Hagen
- 1928 (Jan.) Leo Diegel and Bill Mehlhorn (tie)
- 1927 Tommy Armour
- 1926 Bill Mehlhorn
