= Bellevue Country Club Open =

Golf tournament held in 1920 and 1921

The Bellevue Country Club Open was an American golf tournament held in 1920 and 1921. The tournament was held at Bellevue Country Club in Syracuse, New York. The first event was won easily by the legendary Walter Hagen. His win ultimately earned the imprimatur of the PGA Tour. The following year's event was re-titled the "New York State Open" although it was not officially sponsored by any formal golfing body in the state. Bobby Cruickshank won the event over Hagen, the runner-up this time. Cruickshank's win also retroactively garnered PGA Tour-level status. The club intended to transform the event into "an annual fixture" however the tournament ceased operations after only its second event.

== History ==
The first event was held in 1920 at Bellevue Country Club in Syracuse, New York. There were 54 players at the event. The event "attracted a strong field," according to the Star-Gazette. Walter Hagen recorded 293 strokes to defeat Pat Doyle and Pat O'Hara by eight strokes. The first prize check was worth $500. Runners-up Doyle and O'Hara earned $250 each.

The following August, it was announced that an event would be held again at the same course. The total prize money was $2,000. According to the Star-Gazette, the total purse was the largest of any American golf event in 1921. The event would be entitled the "New York State Open." According to the Brooklyn Daily Eagle, however, there was no evidence that a golfing organizational body in state was sponsoring the event. The Daily Eagle opined that it was "a case of presumption... to label the tournament" as such. The event was held over the course of two days, September 19–20, with two rounds each day. Bobby Cruickshank won the event with a 298 aggregate. Like the previous year, the champion earned $500. Hagen and Mike Brady finished joint second, seven shots behind, and earned $300 each.

The Bellevue Country Club intended to make the tournament into "an annual fixture." However, the 1921 event was the final edition. Later in the decade, another event entitled the New York State Open was established. This event was formally sanctioned by the New York State Golf Association.

== Winners ==
Year	Winner	Score	Margin of victory	Runner(s)-up	Ref.
Bellevue Country Club Open
1920	(United States) Walter Hagen	293	8 strokes	(Ireland) Pat Doyle (United States) Pat O'Hara	
New York State Open
1921	(Scotland) Bobby Cruickshank	298	7 strokes	(United States) Mike Brady (United States) Walter Hagen	

== See also ==
- New York State Open
- New York State Open (1920s event)
