= Philadelphia Open Championship =

Golf tournament

The Philadelphia Open Championship is an annual golf tournament played in the Philadelphia, Pennsylvania area. It is organized by the Golf Association of Philadelphia. It has been played annually since 1903 (except for war years & 2020) at member clubs in Pennsylvania, New Jersey, and Delaware. It was considered a PGA Tour event for most of the period 1916 to 1937.

== Winners ==
- 2020 No tournament
- 2019 Jeff Osberg (amateur)
- 2018 Billy Stewart
- 2017 Matthew Mattare (amateur)
- 2016 Jeff Osberg (amateur)
- 2015 Brandon Matthews (amateur)
- 2014 Matt Teesdale (amateur)
- 2013 Brandon Matthews (amateur)
- 2012 Andrew Mason
- 2011 Andrew Mason
- 2010 Michael R. Brown
- 2009 Rich Steinmetz
- 2008 Greg Pieczynski
- 2007 Mark Miller
- 2006 Dave Quinn
- 2005 Graham Dendler
- 2004 Chris Lange
- 2003 Brian Kelly
- 2002 John Appleget
- 2001 Terry Hertzog
- 2000 Brian Kelly
- 1999 Rick Osberg
- 1998 Jason Lamp
- 1997 Michael Brown
- 1996 Jim Booros
- 1995 Gene Feiger
- 1994 Stu Ingraham
- 1993 Gene Feiger
- 1992 Frank Dobbs
- 1991 Frank Dobbs
- 1990 Pete Oakley
- 1989 Pete Oakley
- 1988 James Masserio
- 1987 Jay Sigel
- 1986 Jay Sigel
- 1985 James Masserio
- 1984 Frank Dobbs
- 1983 Ed Dougherty
- 1982 Harold Perry
- 1981 Dick Hendrickson
- 1980 Jay Sigel
- 1979 Jack Connelly
- 1978 Jay Sigel
- 1977 Jay Sigel
- 1976 Tim DeBaufre
- 1975 Jay Sigel
- 1974 Joseph F. Data
- 1973 Dick Hendrickson
- 1972 Dick Hendrickson
- 1971 Ted McKenzie
- 1970 Dick Smith
- 1969 Bill Hyndman
- 1968 Bill Hyndman
- 1967 John Kennedy
- 1966 Al Besselink
- 1965 Jerry Pisano
- 1964 Pat Schwab
- 1963 Al Besselink
- 1962 Jerry Pisano
- 1961 Dick Sleichter
- 1960 Skee Riegel
- 1959 George Fazio
- 1958 George Fazio
- 1957 Jerry Pisano
- 1956 George Fazio
- 1955 Henry Williams, Jr.
- 1954 Ralph Hutchison
- 1953 George Griffin, Jr.
- 1952 George Fazio
- 1951 Henry Williams, Jr.
- 1950 Bud Lewis
- 1949 George Fazio
- 1948 Jim McHale Jr.
- 1947 Gene Kunes
- 1946 Matt Kowal
- 1945 No tournament
- 1944 Joe Zarhardt
- 1943 No tournament
- 1942 Bud Lewis
- 1941 Terl Johnson
- 1940 Ed Dudley
- 1939 Sammy Byrd
- 1938 Ted Turner
- 1937 Leonard Dodson
- 1936 Ed Dudley
- 1935 Ted Turner
- 1934 Herman Barron
- 1933 Ed Dudley
- 1932 George E. Griffin, Sr.
- 1931 Clarence Hackney
- 1930 Clarence Hackney
- 1929 Ed Dudley
- 1928 Tommy Armour
- 1927 Johnny Farrell
- 1926 Emmet French
- 1925 Johnny Farrell
- 1924 Joe Kirkwood, Sr.
- 1923 Clarence Hackney
- 1922 Charles Hoffner
- 1921 Willie Macfarlane
- 1920 Frank T. MacNamara
- 1919 Emmet French
- 1918 Pat Doyle and Arthur Reid (tie)
- 1917 Jim Barnes
- 1916 James Fraser
- 1915 Tom McNamara
- 1914 Tom McNamara
- 1913 John McDermott
- 1912 Gilbert Nicholls
- 1911 John McDermott
- 1910 John McDermott
- 1909 Gilbert Nicholls
- 1908 Jack Campbell
- 1907 James Campbell
- 1906 Donald Ball
- 1905 James Campbell
- 1904 Jack Campbell
- 1903 Jack Campbell
