= Leo Diegel =

American professional golfer (1899–1951)

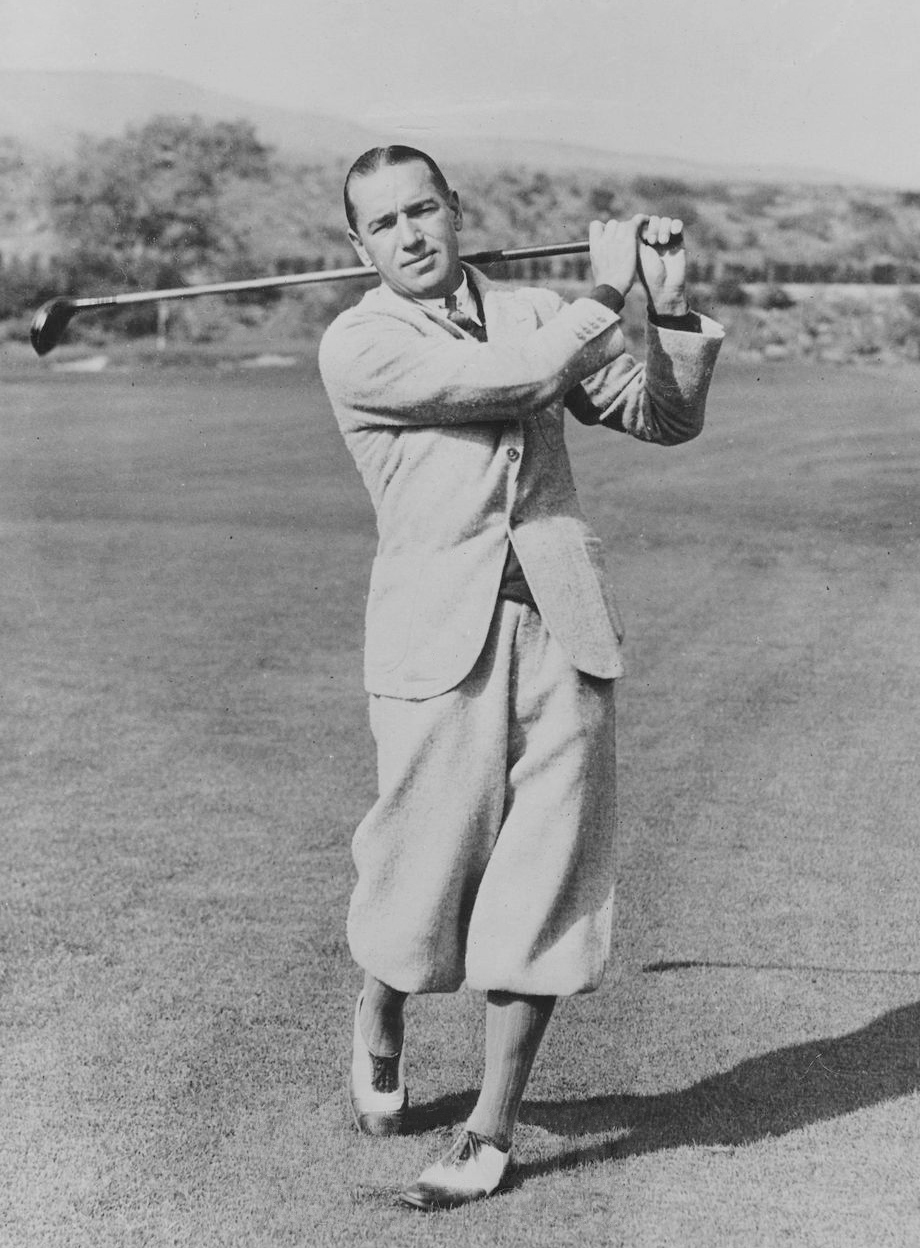
- Diegel in 1932

Personal information
- Full name: Leo Harvey Diegel
- Nickname: Eagle
- Nationality: United States
- Born: April 20, 1899 Gratiot Township, Wayne County, Michigan, U.S.
- Died: May 5, 1951 (aged 52) North Hollywood, California, U.S.
- Height: 5 ft 10 in (178 cm)
- Weight: 164 lb (74 kg; 11.7 st)
- Spouses: Violet Bird Diegel (m.1934–1951, his death)

Career
- Sport: Golf
- Turned professional: 1916
- Former tour: PGA Tour
- Professional wins: 36

Number of wins by tour
- PGA Tour: 27
- Other: 8

Best results in major championships (wins: 2)
- Masters Tournament: T16: 1934
- PGA Championship: Won: 1928, 1929
- U.S. Open: T2: 1920
- The Open Championship: T2: 1930

Achievements and awards
- World Golf Hall of Fame: 2003 (member page)

Leo Harvey Diegel (April 20, 1899 – May 5, 1951) was an American professional golfer of the 1920s and early 1930s. He captured consecutive PGA Championships, played on the first four Ryder Cup teams, and is a member of the World Golf Hall of Fame.

== Early life ==
Born in Gratiot Township, Wayne County, Michigan, Diegel began caddying at age ten and won his first significant event at age 17, the 1916 Michigan Open.

== Professional career ==
Diegel was a runner-up in his first U.S. Open in 1920, one stroke behind champion Ted Ray. He won 28 PGA circuit events, and was a four-time winner of the Canadian Open (1924–25, 1928–29); a record for that event. In 1925, Diegel outperformed over 100 competitors to win the Florida Open (billed as the "Greatest Field Of Golfers Ever to Play in Florida") at the Temple Terrace Golf and Country Club.

Diegel was selected for the first four Ryder Cup teams in 1927, 1929, 1931, and 1933. His greatest season was 1928, with wins at the Canadian Open and the match play PGA Championship, where he stopped the four-year winning streak of Walter Hagen. Diegel defeated him in the quarterfinal to avenge earlier defeats in the 1925 quarterfinal and the 1926 final. Diegel achieved the rare feat of defending both titles successfully in 1929, this time defeating Hagen in the semifinals of the PGA. Diegel was a runner-up to Bobby Jones at the British Open in 1930.

Diegel was an excellent ball-striker, but struggled with his putting after joining the tour. After extensive experimentation, he eventually developed an unusual putting style where he pointed both elbows outwards; this was referred to as 'Diegeling'. He was a tour winner from 1920 to 1934, but dropped out of regular contention when he reached his mid-30s; a playful wrestling incident in Australia in late 1934 with friend Harry Cooper caused nerve damage to his right shoulder and effectively ended his tour career.

== Death ==
Diagnosed with throat and lung cancer in 1947, Diegel died at home in North Hollywood, California in 1951 at age 52; he had taken a position there as a club professional after scaling back his Tour play. He was buried at Mount Olivet Cemetery in Detroit, Michigan.

== Awards and honors ==
Diegel was inducted into the World Golf Hall of Fame in 2003.

== Professional wins (36) ==
=== PGA Tour wins (27) ===
- 1920 (1) Pinehurst Fall Pro-Am Bestball (with Tommy Armour)
- 1921 (1) Coronado Beach Open
- 1922 (1) Shreveport Open
- 1923 (1) District of Columbia Open Championship
- 1924 (3) Shawnee Open, Canadian Open, Illinois Open
- 1925 (3) Florida Open, Canadian Open, Middle Atlantic Open
- 1926 (1) Middle Atlantic Open
- 1927 (2) Middle Atlantic Open, San Diego Open
- 1928 (4) Long Beach Open (January; tie with Bill Mehlhorn), Canadian Open, **PGA Championship**, Massachusetts Open
- 1929 (4) San Diego Open, Miami International Four-Ball (with Walter Hagen), Canadian Open, **PGA Championship**
- 1930 (3) Pacific Southwest Pro, Oregon Open, San Francisco National Match Play Open
- 1933 (1) California Open
- 1934 (2) Rochester Open, New England PGA

Major championships are shown in bold.

Note: The PGA Tour and World Golf Hall of Fame list Diegel with 28 official wins. The PGA Tour book History of the PGA Tour lists 29 wins, and includes the 1925 Mid-Southern Amateur-Professional listed below.

=== Other wins (9) ===
Note: This list may be incomplete.

- 1916 Michigan Open
- 1919 Michigan Open
- 1922 Louisiana Open
- 1925 Mid-Southern Amateur-Professional, Mid South All Pro
- 1926 Maryland Open
- 1931 California Open
- 1933 Timber Point Open, Southern California Open

== Major championships ==
=== Wins (2) ===
Year	Championship	Winning score	Runner-up
1928	PGA Championship	6 & 5	(United States) Al Espinosa
1929	PGA Championship	6 & 4	(United States) Johnny Farrell

Note: The PGA Championship was match play until 1958

=== Results timeline ===
Tournament	1920	1921	1922	1923	1924	1925	1926	1927	1928	1929
U.S. Open	T2	T26	7	T8	T25	8	T3	T11	T18	T8
The Open Championship				T25						3
PGA Championship	R32				R32	QF	2		1	1

Tournament	1930	1931	1932	1933	1934	1935	1936	1937	1938	1939
Masters Tournament	NYF				T16	T19				
U.S. Open	T11	3	4	T17	T17	CUT				
The Open Championship	T2			T3						
PGA Championship	R16	R32		R32	R32	DNQ	DNQ	R64	R32	R32

Win
Top 10
Did not play

NYF = Tournament not yet founded
DNQ = Did not qualify for match play portion
CUT = missed the half-way cut
R64, R32, R16, QF, SF = Round in which player lost in PGA Championship match play
"T" indicates a tie for a place

=== Summary ===
Tournament	Wins	2nd	3rd	Top-5	Top-10	Top-25	Events	Cuts made
Masters Tournament	0	0	0	0	0	2	2	2
U.S. Open	0	1	2	4	8	14	16	15
The Open Championship	0	1	2	3	3	4	4	4
PGA Championship	2	1	0	4	5	12	13	13
Totals	2	3	4	11	16	32	35	34

- Most consecutive cuts made – 31 (1920 U.S. Open – 1935 Masters)
- Longest streak of top-10s – 4 (twice)

== See also ==
- List of golfers with most PGA Tour wins
