= 1928 PGA Championship =

Coordinates: 39.442°N 76.663°W

Tournament information
- Dates: October 1–6, 1928
- Location: Lutherville, Maryland
- Course(s): Baltimore Country Club; Five Farms (East) Course
- Organized by: PGA of America
- Tour(s): PGA Tour
- Format: Match play - 5 rounds

Statistics
- Par: 70
- Field: 63 players, 32 to match play
- Cut: 160 (+20)
- Prize fund: $10,400

Champion
- (United States) Leo Diegel
- def. (United States) Al Espinosa, 6 and 5

Location in the United States
Location in Maryland

The 1928 PGA Championship was the 11th PGA Championship, held October 1–6 at the Five Farms Course of the Baltimore Country Club in Lutherville, Maryland, north of Baltimore. Then a match play championship, Leo Diegel defeated Al Espinosa 6 and 5 in the finals to win the first of his two consecutive titles.

Prior to the finals, Diegel defeated both Walter Hagen and Gene Sarazen, the winners of the previous seven PGA Championships, in the two preceding matches. He prevailed 2 and 1 over nemesis Hagen in the quarterfinals and 9 and 8 over Sarazen in the semifinals. Diegel had lost to Hagen in the 1925 quarterfinals (40 holes) and the 1926 finals.

Five-time champion Hagen had won 22 consecutive matches and four straight titles at the PGA Championship. Prior to his loss to Diegel in the quarterfinals, his match record in the 1920s was 32–1 (.970), falling only to Sarazen in 38 holes in the 1923 finals.

The Five Farms Course, now the East Course, was designed by A. W. Tillinghast and opened two years earlier in September 1926.

Diegel continued the tradition of repeat champions and successfully defended his title in 1929.

== Format ==
The match play format at the PGA Championship in 1928 called for 12 rounds (216 holes) in six days:

- Monday – 36-hole stroke play qualifier
  - top 32 professionals advanced to match play
- Tuesday – first round – 36 holes
- Wednesday – second round – 36 holes
- Thursday – quarterfinals – 36 holes
- Friday – semifinals – 36 holes
- Saturday – final – 36 holes

== Final results ==
Saturday, October 6, 1928

Place	Player
1	(United States) Leo Diegel
2	(United States) Al Espinosa
T3	(United States) Gene Sarazen
T3	(United States) Horton Smith
T5	(United States) Perry Del Vecchio
T5	(United States) Ed Dudley
T5	(United States) Walter Hagen
T5	(United States) Jock Hutchison

== Final eight bracket ==
Quarter-finals; October 4
Leo Diegel	2&1
Walter Hagen
Gene Sarazen	7&6
Ed Dudley
Al Espinosa	5&4
Jock Hutchison
Horton Smith	2up
Perry Del Vecchio

Semi-finals; October 5
Leo Diegel	9&8
Gene Sarazen
Al Espinosa	6&5
Horton Smith

Finals; October 6
Leo Diegel	6&5
Al Espinosa
