= Arthur Reid (golfer) =

English professional golfer (1882–1959)

Personal information
- Full name: Arthur Edwin Reid
- Nationality: England; United States
- Born: 16 September 1882 Bulwell, Nottinghamshire, England
- Died: 6 January 1959 (aged 76) Old Saybrook, Connecticut, U.S.
- Height: 5 ft 7.5 in (1.71 m)
- Weight: 150 lb (68 kg)
- Spouse: Rebecca Hencher
- Children: 3

Career
- Sport: Golf
- Status: Professional
- Former tour: PGA Tour
- Professional wins: 2

Best results in major championships
- Masters Tournament: DNP
- PGA Championship: DNP
- U.S. Open: T37: 1919
- The Open Championship: 47th: 1909

Arthur Edwin Reid (16 September 1882 – 6 January 1959) was an English professional golfer who played extensively in the United States. He won the 1905 Swiss Open and the 1918 Philadelphia Open Championship.

== Early life ==
Though born in England, Reid was of Scottish descent. He worked at the North Shore Club in Blackpool, England.

== Professional career ==
In 1905, Reid won the Swiss Open. The Open was played on the Lucerne Course and was contested over 36 holes, four rounds of the 9-hole course. Reid was the local professional and completed the four rounds in 155 (38-39-37-41), winning by 13 strokes from Bernard Callaway. Reid won a gold medal and the £10 first prize.

In September 1907 he accepted a position as the head professional at the Bristol and Clifton Club. Prior to his time at North Shore Club he had been engaged at Boston, Woodhall Spa, Gainsborough, Lucerne, Paris, and Seaford Links Club in Seaford, England.

Sailing aboard the RMS Baltic, Reid and his wife left Liverpool on 16 February 1915 and arrived in New York City on 26 February 1915. Later in 1915 he took his first job at the Upper Montclair Country Club in New Jersey. In 1918 he won the Philadelphia Open Championship, sharing the title with Pat Doyle. By 1921, he was playing out of Ardsley Club, Ardsley-on-Hudson, New York.

Reid was also the long-time professional at The Country Club of Farmington, near Hartford, Connecticut, having the best score in a July 1927 club tournament. In 1929, Reid was elected president of the Central Connecticut Professional Golfer's Organization.

== Personal life ==
Reid and his wife, Rebecca Reid (née Hencher), had three children. Reid's brother-in-law was the noted French golf professional Louis Tellier. Reid had a younger brother, Wilfrid, who was also a professional golfer.

== Professional wins (2) ==
- 1905 Swiss Open
- 1918 Philadelphia Open Championship (tied with Pat Doyle)
