= New York State Open (1920s event) =

Defunct golf tournament

The New York State Open was the state open golf tournament of the state of New York from 1928 to 1930. In early 1928, the New York State Golf Association announced that they had the financial support from Onondaga Country Club in Syracuse to host their first state open. The first event was supposed to be limited to New York state residents but when golfers from other parts of the country arrived in Syracuse tournament officials let them in. The following year, officials formally allowed golfers from other states to participate. Billy Burke won the event over a number of "star" golfers. The following year's event was a three-horse battle between Burke, Wiffy Cox, and recent U.S. Open champion Johnny Farrell with Farrell coming out on top. Later in 1930, the state's golf association announced that the event would be "dropped" due to financial concerns.

== History ==
In February 1928, the New York State Golf Association held a meeting. At the meeting, businessman John S. Nash made a "startling" announcement that the Onondaga Golf and Country Club, located in Syracuse, was ready to host a state open. Onondaga's financial support was considered "the one great break" the event needed to establish itself. It was New York's first official state open. The event was scheduled to be over the course of two days, on July 6–7. The total prize money was over $2,000, significantly more "than the average open championship purse." The event originally was "restricted" to citizens of New York state. A number of residents from outside the state traveled to Syracuse, however, including Bob MacDonald, unaware that it was supposed to be a "closed event" limited to New York state residents. The "committee in charge did not have the heart to bar them" and let these players play. During the event, MacDonald led for most of the last day but "blew up" during the final round's back nine opening doors. The "unheralded" Willie Klein took advantage to earn the clubhouse lead. MacDonald still had a chance to tie at the par-4 18th hole. However, his 20-foot birdie putt missed by a "hair's breadth" giving Klein the win.

In December 1928, it was decided that the event would be "open" to golfers all over the country in an effort to attract the best field possible. A number of "star" golfers from around the country did indeed play guaranteeing that the "championship... just couldn't flop." The event was held at the Westchester-Biltmore Country Club near New York City the week before the 1929 U.S. Open in June. The field of roughly 50 players entered the event. In the second round, Billy Burke broke the course record with a four-under-par 68 to take the lead Harry Cooper and George Christ. He "played everything safe" during the final two rounds, with rounds of 73 and 74, to defeat Christ by four strokes. In addition, he defeated Cooper, Macdonald Smith, and Gene Sarazen by several shots.

The 1930 tournament was held at Green Meadow Country Club in Harrison, New York in late June. The tournament was competing with the Shawnee Open which was held the same week though it was expected to have a better field. The year's open was expected to have an "excellent array of entries" including Johnny Farrell, Joe Turnesa, and Bill Mehlhorn. In the first round, Farrell broke the course record with a 68 to take a two-shot lead over Billy Burke. Both players "slipped" with a 73 in the second round but remained in first and second place, respectively. The final two rounds would be played over the course of one day. In the morning, Burke made a number of birdies on the back nine to tie Farrell. In addition, Wiffy Cox shot a 70, the best score of the third round, to get within three strokes. In the final round, he continued to play "marvelous golf." He matched par on the front nine with a 34 to tie for the lead. On the par-4 17th hole he remained in contention. His drive "was the best he had gotten off in the entire tournament" but ended up in a divot. His approach landed in a bunker and he eventually made double-bogey. He made par at the par-5 18th, however, to take the clubhouse lead. He was still only one back of Farrell, tied with Burke for second place. On the final hole, however, Farrell made birdie to secure a two-shot win over Cox. Burke, meanwhile, three-putted for bogey to fall into solo third.

In December 1930, the New York State Golf Association announced that they decided to "drop" the event. It was cited as financially prohibitive. They intended to focus more on junior and sectional championships.

== Winners ==
| Year | Winner | Score | Margin of victory | Runner-up | Venue | Ref. |
|---|---|---|---|---|---|---|
| 1928 | (United States) Willie Klein | 293 | 1 stroke | (Scotland) Bob MacDonald | Onondaga | |
| 1929 | (United States) Billy Burke | 287 | 4 strokes | (United States) George Christ | Westchester Biltmore | |
| 1930 | (United States) Johnny Farrell | 288 | 2 strokes | (United States) Wiffy Cox | Green Meadows | |

== See also ==
- New York State Open
- Bellevue Country Club Open
