= Lonnie Nielsen =

American professional golfer (1953–2021)

Personal information
- Full name: Lonnie Dean Nielsen
- Nationality: United States
- Born: June 29, 1953 Belle Plaine, Iowa, U.S.
- Died: January 20, 2021 (aged 67) Clarence, New York, U.S.
- Height: 5 ft 11 in (1.80 m)
- Weight: 200 lb (91 kg; 14 st)
- Spouse: Mary Jo (1977–2021)
- Children: 3

Career
- Sport: Golf
- College: University of Iowa
- Turned professional: 1976
- Former tours: PGA Tour; Champions Tour
- Professional wins: 39

Number of wins by tour
- PGA Tour Champions: 2
- Other: 37

Best results in major championships
- Masters Tournament: DNP
- PGA Championship: T11: 1986
- U.S. Open: CUT: 1977, 1983
- The Open Championship: DNP

Lonnie Dean Nielsen (June 29, 1953 – January 20, 2021) was an American professional golfer.

== Early life and amateur career ==
Nielsen was born and raised in Belle Plaine, Iowa. His father started him in golf as a youngster on the sand green courses in and around his hometown. He attended the University of Iowa, where he earned a Bachelor of Business Administration degree in 1976.

== Professional career ==
Nielsen was a member of the PGA Tour from 1978–1983 but did not win any tournaments. He has won over 30 other tournaments though, most of which were played in New York. As a club pro, Nielsen finished T11 at the 1986 PGA Championship.

Nielsen became a member of the Champions Tour upon reaching the age of 50 in the summer of 2003. He won his first Champions Tour event at the Commerce Bank Championship in 2007. His second Champions Tour win came in 2009 at the Dick's Sporting Goods Open, where he came from three strokes behind Fred Funk in the final round with a 9 under par 63 to win by three strokes.

In 2009, Nielsen became the first tour professional to serve as a lead contributor to the GIVE (Golf For Injured Veterans Everywhere) Foundation.

== Personal life ==
Nielsen died on January 20, 2021; he had dementia in the years prior to his death.

== Awards and honors ==
- In 2010, Nielsen was inducted into the Iowa Golf Hall of Fame.
- In 2018, Nielsen was inducted into the Greater Buffalo Sports Hall of Fame.

== Professional wins (39) ==
=== Regular career wins (35) ===
- 1979 Waterloo Open Golf Classic
- 1984 Western New York PGA Match Play Championship
- 1985 New York State Open, Western New York Section PGA Championship
- 1986 Western New York PGA Match Play Championship, Western New York Section PGA Championship
- 1987 Western New York Section PGA Championship
- 1988 PGA Match Play Championship, PGA Stroke Play Championship
- 1989 New York State Open, Western New York Open, Western New York Section PGA Championship, PGA Match Play Championship
- 1990 Western New York Open, Western New York PGA Match Play Championship, Western New York Section PGA Championship
- 1991 Western New York PGA Match Play Championship
- 1993 Western New York PGA Match Play Championship, Western New York Open, Western New York Section PGA Championship
- 1994 Western New York PGA Match Play Championship, Western New York Section PGA Championship
- 1995 Western New York Open
- 1996 Western New York Section PGA Championship
- 1997 Western New York Open
- 1998 Western New York Open, Western New York PGA Match Play Championship
- 1999 Western New York PGA Match Play Championship
- 2000 Western New York Section PGA Championship
- 2001 Western New York PGA Match Play Championship
- 2002 Western New York PGA Match Play Championship, Western New York Open
- 2003 Western New York Open
- 2013 Western New York Section PGA Championship, Western New York PGA Match Play Championship

=== Champions Tour wins (2) ===
| No. | Date | Tournament | Winning score | Margin of victory | Runner(s)-up |
|---|---|---|---|---|---|
| 1 | Jul 1, 2007 | Commerce Bank Championship | −14 (66-64-69=199) | 2 strokes | (United States) Loren Roberts |
| 2 | Jun 28, 2009 | Dick's Sporting Goods Open | −21 (66-66-63=195) | 3 strokes | (United States) Ronnie Black, (United States) Fred Funk |

Champions Tour playoff record (0–1)

| No. | Year | Tournament | Opponent | Result |
|---|---|---|---|---|
| 1 | 2006 | JELD-WEN Tradition | (Argentina) Eduardo Romero | Lost to birdie on first extra hole |

=== Other senior wins (2) ===
- 2003 Otesago Senior Open Championship, Turning Stone Seniors Championship

== Results in major championships ==
| Tournament | 1977 | 1978 | 1979 |
|---|---|---|---|
| U.S. Open | CUT | | |
| PGA Championship | | | |

| Tournament | 1980 | 1981 | 1982 | 1983 | 1984 | 1985 | 1986 | 1987 | 1988 | 1989 |
|---|---|---|---|---|---|---|---|---|---|---|
| U.S. Open | | | | CUT | | | | | | |
| PGA Championship | CUT | | | | | | T11 | T56 | CUT | CUT |

| Tournament | 1990 | 1991 | 1992 | 1993 | 1994 | 1995 | 1996 |
|---|---|---|---|---|---|---|---|
| U.S. Open | | | | | | | |
| PGA Championship | CUT | T70 | | | CUT | | CUT |

Did not play

CUT = missed the half-way cut
"T" = tied
Note: Nielsen never played in the Masters Tournament or The Open Championship.

== U.S. national team appearances ==
- PGA Cup: 1988 (winners), 1996 (tie)

== See also ==
- Fall 1977 PGA Tour Qualifying School graduates
- 1982 PGA Tour Qualifying School graduates
