= Bill Mehlhorn =

American professional golfer (1898–1989)

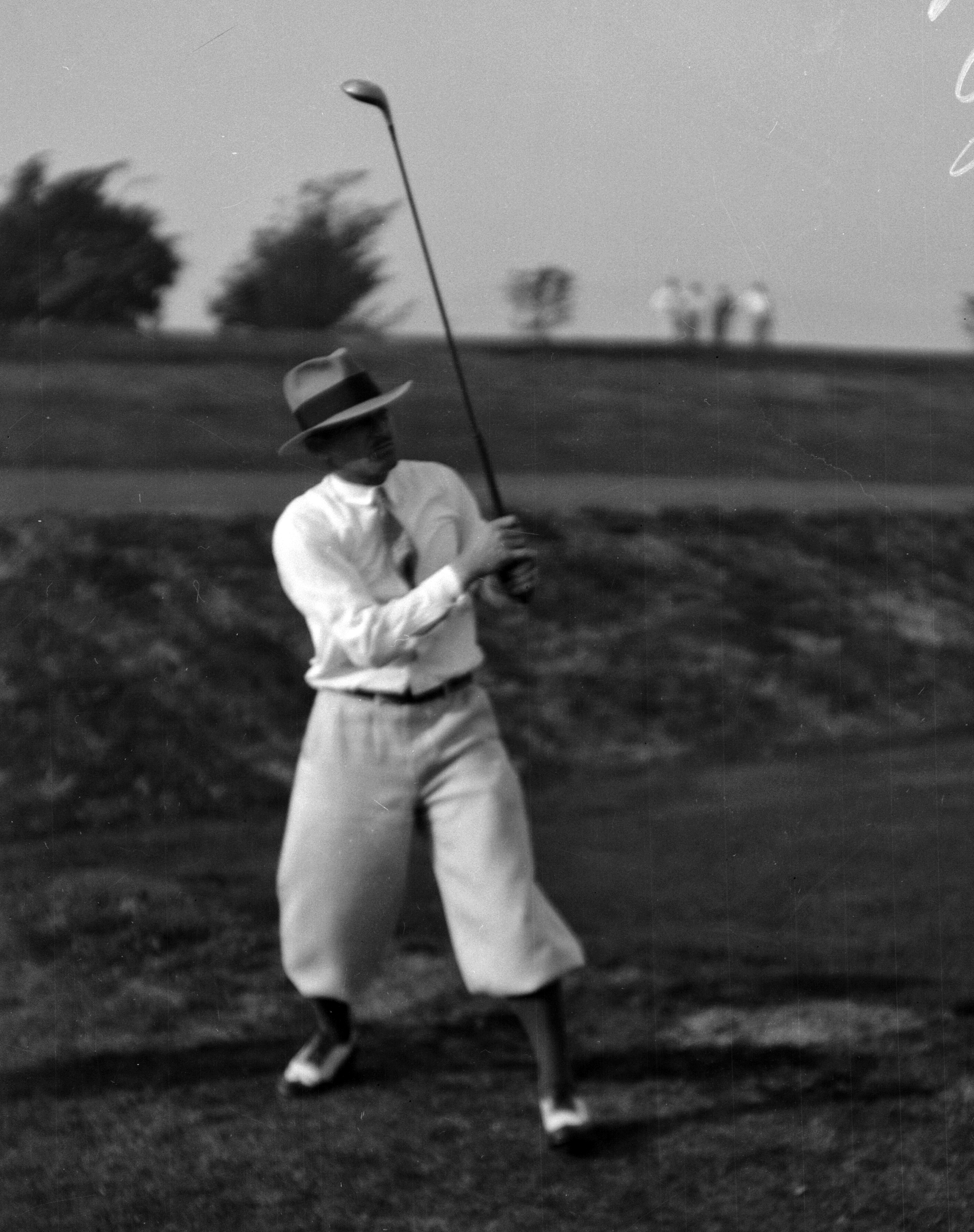

Personal information
- Full name: William Earl Mehlhorn
- Nickname: Wild Bill
- Nationality: United States
- Born: December 2, 1898 Elgin, Illinois, U.S.
- Died: April 5, 1989 (aged 90) Miami, Florida, U.S.
- Spouse: Velva Ivo (aka Virginia Raye)
- Children: 4

Career
- Sport: Golf
- Turned professional: 1920
- Former tour: PGA Tour
- Professional wins: 21

Number of wins by tour
- PGA Tour: 19
- Other: 2

Best results in major championships
- Masters Tournament: T33: 1937
- PGA Championship: 2nd: 1925
- U.S. Open: 3rd/T3: 1924, 1926
- The Open Championship: T8: 1926

William Earl Mehlhorn (December 2, 1898 – April 5, 1989) was an American professional golfer who played on the PGA Tour in its early days, and was at his best in the 1920s.

== Career ==
Mehlhorn was born in Elgin, Illinois and lived a majority of his life in Seaford, New York when not traveling. He often wore cowboy hats on the course and was nicknamed "Wild Bill." He won 19 times on the PGA Tour, but did not win a major championship. Only a handful of golfers have won more often on the PGA Tour without claiming a major. He finished 14 times in the top-10 at majors. His best finish was runner-up to Walter Hagen at the PGA Championship in 1925. Mehlhorn competed on the first Ryder Cup team in 1927 as well as the inaugural Masters Tournament in 1934. He was a gallery favorite because of his uncanny accuracy from tee to green, but his game was undermined by problems with putting: the yips.

Mehlhorn also designed and plotted several golf courses across the country, including Pensacola, Florida's Osceola Golf Course.

Mehlhorn retired and moved to Miami, Florida with his family, where he coached golf at Florida International University with Bob Shave during his later years. Mehlhorn and Shave wrote the book, Golf Secrets Exposed, in the early 1980s to summarize Mehlhorn's golf secrets and insight. Two versions of the book have been published since Mehlhorn's death.

== Professional wins (21) ==
=== PGA Tour wins (19) ===
- 1923 (1) Oklahoma Open
- 1924 (1) Western Open
- 1926 (5) Long Beach Open, South Central Open, South Florida Open Championship, Santa Clara Valley Open, San Jose Open
- 1927 (1) San Jose Open
- 1928 (6) Long Beach Open (January; tie with Leo Diegel), Texas Open, Richmond Open, Montauk Open, Westchester Open, Hawaiian Open
- 1929 (4) El Paso Open, Texas Open, South Central Open, Metropolitan Open
- 1930 (1) La Gorce Open

=== Other wins ===
- 1924 Miami International Four-Ball (with Macdonald Smith)
- 1926 Miami International Four-Ball (with Macdonald Smith)

== Results in major championships ==
| Tournament | 1919 | 1920 | 1921 | 1922 | 1923 | 1924 | 1925 | 1926 | 1927 | 1928 | 1929 |
|---|---|---|---|---|---|---|---|---|---|---|---|
| U.S. Open | WD | T27 | | 4 | T8 | 3 | T15 | T3 | 5 | T49 | T55 |
| The Open Championship | NT | | T16 | | | | | T8 | CUT | 9 | T36 |
| PGA Championship | R32 | R16 | | | | R32 | 2 | | R32 | R32 | R16 |

| Tournament | 1930 | 1931 | 1932 | 1933 | 1934 | 1935 | 1936 | 1937 |
|---|---|---|---|---|---|---|---|---|
| Masters Tournament | NYF | NYF | NYF | NYF | WD | T35 | | T33 |
| U.S. Open | T9 | T4 | T35 | | T37 | | | T50 |
| The Open Championship | | | | | | | | |
| PGA Championship | R32 | R16 | | | R32 | | SF | R64 |

Top 10
Did not play

NYF = tournament not yet founded
NT = no tournament
WD = withdrew
CUT = missed the half-way cut
R64, R32, R16, QF, SF = round in which player lost in PGA Championship match play
"T" indicates a tie for a place

=== Summary ===
| Tournament | Wins | 2nd | 3rd | Top-5 | Top-10 | Top-25 | Events | Cuts made |
|---|---|---|---|---|---|---|---|---|
| Masters Tournament | 0 | 0 | 0 | 0 | 0 | 0 | 3 | 2 |
| U.S. Open | 0 | 0 | 2 | 5 | 7 | 8 | 15 | 14 |
| The Open Championship | 0 | 0 | 0 | 0 | 2 | 3 | 5 | 4 |
| PGA Championship | 0 | 1 | 1 | 2 | 5 | 11 | 12 | 12 |
| Totals | 0 | 1 | 3 | 7 | 14 | 22 | 35 | 32 |

- Most consecutive cuts made – 13 (1919 PGA – 1927 U.S. Open)
- Longest streak of top-10s – 4 (1925 PGA – 1927 U.S. Open)

== See also ==
- List of golfers with most PGA Tour wins
