= Dallas Open (1926) =

1926 Dallas Open
Tournament information
- Dates: January 2x−25, 1926
- Location: Dallas, Texas; 32.722°N 96.797°W
- Course: Cedar Crest Country Club
- Tour: PGA Tour
- Format: Stroke play

Statistics
- Winner's share: $800

Champion
- (Scotland) (United States) Macdonald Smith
- 298

Location map
- Location in the United States Location in Texas

The Dallas Open Tournament was a professional golf event in Texas played only in 1926.

It was held in late January at Cedar Crest Country Club, south of central Dallas, and was won by Macdonald Smith at 298, three strokes ahead of runner-up Al Espinosa. The winner's share of the purse was $800.

== See also ==
- Dallas Open, PGA Tour event since 1944
