= New York State Open =

Golf tournament

Tournament information
- Location: Farmingdale, New York
- Established: 1978
- Course: Bethpage Black Course
- Organized by: PGA Metropolitan Section
- Format: Stroke play
- Month played: July

Current champion
- Peicheng Chen

Location map
- Location in the United States Location in New York State

The New York State Open (known for sponsorship reasons as Lenox Advisors/NFP New York State Open) is the New York state open golf tournament, open to both amateur and professional golfers. It is organized by the Metropolitan chapter of the Professional Golfers' Association of America. It has been played annually since 1978 at a variety of courses around the state, but exclusively at Bethpage Black since 1996. It is a 54-hole stroke-play event, with a cut after 36 holes. In 2024, the first place prize was $17,500.

Earlier events by the same name were played in 1920 and 1921 and again from 1928 to 1930.

== Winners ==
Year	Winner	Score	To par	Margin of victory	Runner(s)-up	Venue	Ref.
Lenox Advisors/NFP New York State Open
2026	Peicheng Chen (2)	211	−2	Playoff	AJ Cavotta	Bethpage Black	
2025	Christian Cavaliere (a)	208	−2	Playoff	Peter Ballo	Glen Oaks Club	
2024	Peter Ballo	203	−10	1 stroke	Josh Goldenberg	Bethpage Black	
2023	Peicheng Chen (a)	207	−6	1 stroke	Matt Lowe (a)	Bethpage Black	
2022	Michael Miller (2)	207	−6	7 strokes	Mark Brown; Matt Dubrowski; Justin Lane	Bethpage Black	
2021	Danny Balin (3)	207	−6	1 stroke	Dylan Crowley	Bethpage Black	
2020	James Nicholas	207	−6	2 strokes	Jason Caron; Josh Goldenberg	Bethpage Black	
2019	Mike Ballo Jr.	209	−4	Playoff (Note: Ballo defeated Labritz with a par on the first playoff hole.)	Rob Labritz	Bethpage Black	
2018	Andrew Svoboda (2)	210	−3	2 strokes	Kyle Brey	Bethpage Black	
Lenox Advisors New York State Open
2017	Cameron Young (a)	204	−9	Playoff (Note: Young defeated DeForest with a birdie on the second playoff hole.)	Chris DeForest	Bethpage Black	
2016	Rob Labritz (3)	213	E	Playoff (Note: Labritz defeated Dobyns with a par on the first playoff hole.)	Matt Dobyns	Bethpage Black	
2015	Jeb Buchanan	207	−6	Playoff (Note: Buchanan defeated Bartow with a par on the first playoff hole.)	Brian Bartow	Bethpage Black	
2014	Michael Miller	205	−8	4 strokes	Adam Fuchs	Bethpage Black	
2013	Danny Balin (2)	206	−7	2 strokes	Andrew Giuliani	Bethpage Black	
2012	Danny Balin	211	−2	1 stroke	Del Ponchock	Bethpage Black	
2011	Rob Labritz (2)	207	−6	2 strokes	Matt Dobyns	Bethpage Black	
2010	Keith Dicciani	212	−1	Playoff (Note: Dicciani defeated Miller with a par on the first playoff hole.)	Jamie Miller	Bethpage Black	
2009	Brian Lamberti	208	−2	1 stroke	Keith Dicciani	Bethpage Black	
2008	Rob Labritz	215	+5	2 strokes	Carl Alexander	Bethpage Black	
North Fork New York State Open
2007	Andrew Svoboda	211	−2	4 strokes	Chris Damiano; Craig Thomas	Bethpage Black	
2006	Jimmy Hazen	211	−2	3 strokes	Rick Hartmann; Mike Meehan	Bethpage Black	
2005	Frank Bensel	208	−5	4 strokes	Matthew Abbott; Rick Hartmann	Bethpage Black	
New York State Open
2004	Jesse Fitzgerald	211	−2	1 stroke	Greg Bisconti	Bethpage Black	
2003	Mark Mielke (2)	209	−4	1 stroke	Frank Bensel	Bethpage Black	
MONY New York State Open
2002	Mark Brown (2)	219	+6	2 strokes	Rick Hartmann; Mark Tucker	Bethpage Black	
2001	John Nieporte	210	E	5 strokes	Mike Gilmore; Rick Hartmann; Darrell Kestner	Bethpage Black	
2000	P. J. Cowan (3)	209	−1	5 strokes	Carl Alexander; Paul Alexander	Bethpage Black	
1999	Mark Brown	210	E	2 strokes	Mike Gilmore	Bethpage Black	
1998	P. J. Cowan (2)	205	−5	8 strokes	Frank Bensel	Bethpage Black	
1997	P. J. Cowan	204	−9	3 strokes	Bruce Zabriski	Bethpage Black	
1996	Rick Hartmann	207	−6	2 strokes	Tom Sutter; Bruce Zabriski	Bethpage Black	
Carvel/Snapple New York State Open
1995	Ron McDougal	208	−8	4 strokes	Mark Mielke	Concord Monster	
1994	Darrell Kestner (2)	208	−5	3 strokes	Rick Hartmann; Lonnie Nielsen; Sam Olson; Larry Rentz; Bruce Zabriski	Bethpage Black	
Michelob New York State Open
1993	Darrell Kestner	210	−6	5 strokes	Kevin Roman	Albany CC	
1992	Mark Mielke	206	−10	1 stroke	Mike Caporale; Alan Schulte	Hiland Park CC	
1991	Tim Straub	211	−5	3 strokes	Ron McDougal	Concord Monster	
1990	Bobby Heins	210	−3	1 stroke	Doug Miller; Bruce Zabriski	Bethpage Black	
1989	Lonnie Nielsen (2)	203	−13	4 strokes	E.J. Pfister	Radisson Greens GC	
1988	E. J. Phister	209	−4	3 strokes	Jim Albus	Grossinger's Resort	
1987	Mel Baum	210	−3	Playoff (Note: Baum defeated Worthington with a birdie on the second sudden-death playoff hole.)	Brad Worthington	Grossinger's Resort	
1986	Tom McGinnis	204	−9	5 strokes	Bruce Zabriski	Grossinger's Resort	
1985	Lonnie Nielsen	205	−8	1 stroke	Jim Thorpe	Grossinger's Resort	
1984	Bruce Zabriski	213	E	1 stroke	Jeff Grygiel; Jeff Foxx	Grossinger's Resort	
1983	Joey Sindelar	211	−2	1 stroke	Bob Heins	Grossinger's Resort	
1982	George Burns	207	−6	2 strokes	John Calabria	Grossinger's Resort	
1981	John Calabria	211	−2	2 strokes	Carl Lohren	Grossinger's Resort	
1980	Denny Lyons	214	+1	1 stroke	Bob Allen Jr. Jorge Geckler	Grossinger's Resort	
New York State Open
1979	Mal Galletta Jr.	207	−6	2 strokes	Richard Spears	Grossinger's Resort	
1978	Jim Albus	210	−3	1 stroke	David Philo	Grossinger's Resort	

== See also ==
- New York State Open (1920s event)
- Bellevue Country Club Open
