= Gratiot Township, Michigan =

- Former civil township
- Former location within the state of Michigan Former location within the United States
- Coordinates: 42°26′45″N 82°57′06″W
- Country: United States
- State: Michigan
- County: Wayne
- Organized: 1827
- Disestablished: 1951
- Time zone: UTC-5 (Eastern (EST))
  - Summer (DST): UTC-4 (EDT)

Gratiot Township was a civil township of Wayne County in the U.S. state of Michigan. Located in the northeast corner of the county, the township's eastern and southern border was with Grosse Pointe Township along Mack Road (now Mack Avenue). The northern border was the Macomb County line, and the western border was with Hamtramck Township.

== History ==
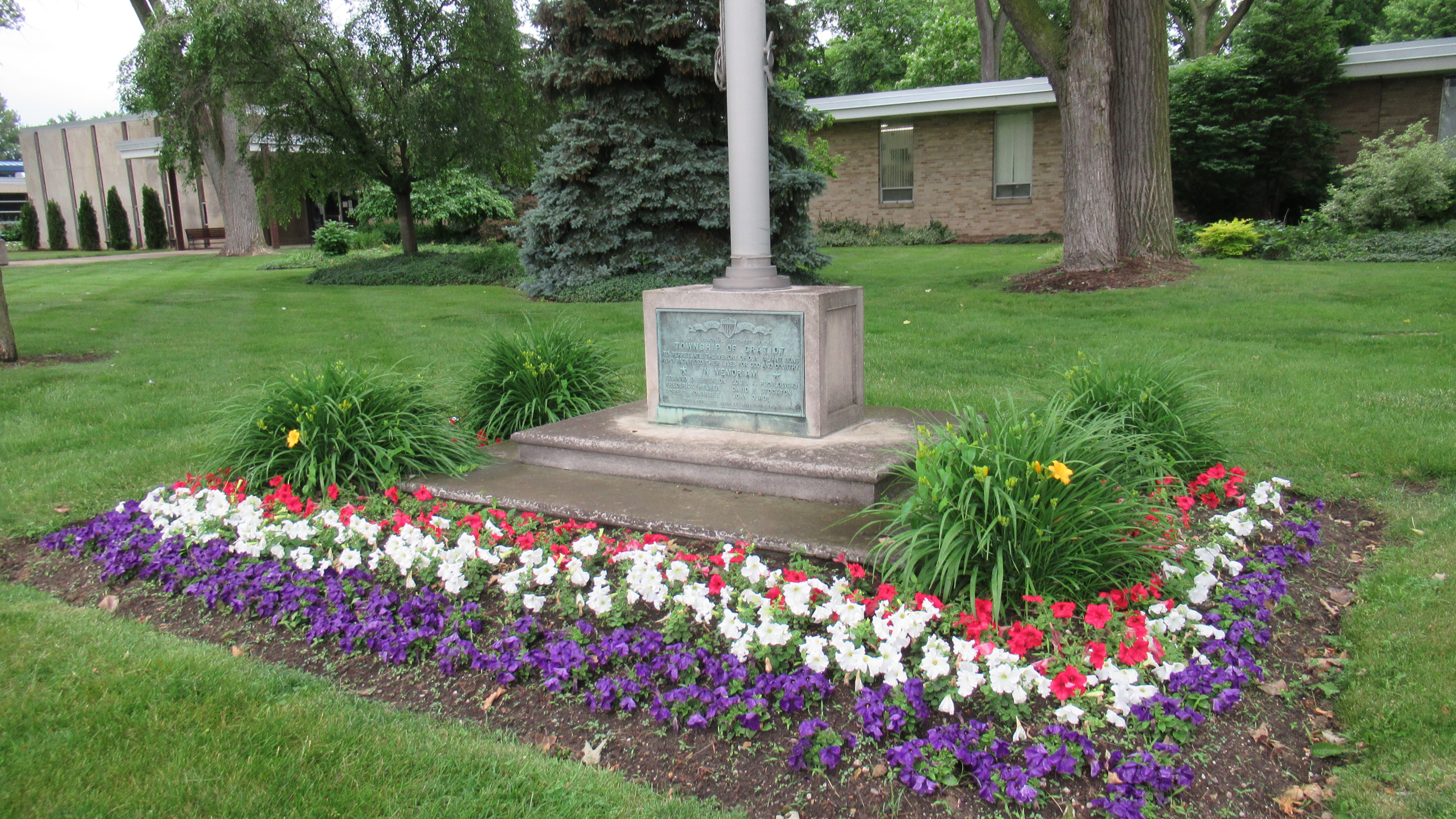
Plaque honoring WWII casualties from Gratiot Township, located in front of the current Harper Woods Municipal Building

The area that would become Gratiot Township was originally organized as part of Hamtramck Township, which was created by the state legislature in 1827. The eastern section of the township of Hamtramck was then split off and reorganized as Grosse Pointe Township in 1848. Gratiot Township came into existence when the northwestern part of Grosse Pointe Township was split off and organized by the Board of Supervisors of Wayne County in May 1895.

Gratiot Township had a relatively short existence. Detroit had already begun annexing land in the township soon after its creation, as well as those of neighboring Grosse Pointe and Hamtramck. During this same period, the communities in Grosse Pointe Township had begun to incorporate as villages or cities to further protect themselves from the encroachment of Detroit. By 1926, Detroit reached its greatest extent leaving Gratiot Township's western border at Kelly Road and its southern border at Kingsville Avenue. The township ceased to exist in 1951 when its entire area was incorporated as the city of Harper Woods in anticipation of the construction of Eastland Center in the northwestern corner of the township.

== See also ==
- Grosse Pointe Township
- Greenfield Township
- Hamtramck Township
