= Jim Ballantine (ice hockey) =

American ice hockey player

- Born: November 6, 1967 Union Lake, Michigan, U.S.
- Died: January 4, 2002 (aged 34) Michigan, U.S.
- Height: 5 ft 11 in (180 cm)
- Weight: 185 lb (84 kg; 13 st 3 lb)
- Position: Center
- Shot: Right
- Played for: Columbus Chill; Richmond Renegades; Indianapolis Ice; Dallas Freeze
- Playing career: 1991–1994

Jim Jeffery Ballantine (November 6, 1967 – January 2002) was an American ice hockey center.

== Early life and education ==
Ballantine was born in Union Lake, Michigan. He attended the University of Michigan, where he played on the Michigan Wolverines men's ice hockey team.

== Career ==
Ballantine started his professional career with the Columbus Chill in the ECHL. He also played for the Richmond Renegades (ECHL), Indianapolis Ice (IHL), and Dallas Freeze (CHL).

Ballantine was the first player to wear a three-digit number in a professional sports game. He wore the number 101 to promote Columbus, Ohio radio station CD101. Ballantine was a regular on-air personality on the station. Ballantine formerly wore number 19, in a nod to longtime Detroit Red Wings captain Steve Yzerman.

== Personal life ==
Ballantine died in 2002 from Lou Gherig's Disease (ALS).
