= 1929 PGA Championship =

Coordinates: 34.051°N 118.407°W

Tournament information
- Dates: December 2–7, 1929
- Location: Los Angeles, California
- Course: Hillcrest Country Club
- Organized by: PGA of America
- Tour: PGA Tour
- Format: Match play - 5 rounds

Statistics
- Par: 71
- Field: 32 to match play
- Cut: 149 (+7), playoff
- Prize fund: $5,000
- Winner's share: $1,000

Champion
- (United States) Leo Diegel
- def. Johnny Farrell, 6 and 4

Location in the United States
Location in California
Location in Los Angeles

The 1929 PGA Championship was the 12th PGA Championship, held December 2–7 at Hillcrest Country Club in Los Angeles, California. Then a match play championship, defending champion Leo Diegel defeated Johnny Farrell 6 and 4 in the finals to win the second of his two major titles.

Like the year before, Diegel defeated both Walter Hagen and Gene Sarazen on his way to the title; this year he won 3 and 2 over both, Sarazen in the quarterfinals and Hagen in the semifinals.

Prior to his loss to Diegel in the semifinals, five-time champion Hagen was 35–2 (.946) in match play at the PGA Championship in the 1920s, losing only to Sarazen in 38 holes in the 1923 finals, and Diegel 2 and 1 in the 1928 quarterfinals. Hagen's victory over Tony Manero in the 1929 quarterfinals was his last match win at the PGA Championship until 1940; he was winless in the 1930s with five first round losses.

This was the first major championship played in the western United States; it was originally scheduled to be played in Santa Barbara. The PGA Championship returned to the west a dozen years later in 1941 in Colorado.

In the Cheviot Hills neighborhood of Los Angeles, Hillcrest later hosted the Los Angeles Open on the PGA Tour in 1932 and 1942, the latter won by Ben Hogan in an 18-hole playoff.

== Format ==
The match play format at the PGA Championship in 1929 called for 12 rounds (216 holes) in six days:

- Monday – 36-hole stroke play qualifier
  - top 32 professionals advanced to match play
- Tuesday – first round – 36 holes
- Wednesday – second round – 36 holes
- Thursday – quarterfinals – 36 holes
- Friday – semifinals – 36 holes
- Saturday – final – 36 holes

== Final results ==
Saturday, December 7, 1929

Place	Player
1	(United States) Leo Diegel
2	(United States) Johnny Farrell
T3	(United States) Walter Hagen
T3	(United States) Al Watrous
T5	(United States) Al Espinosa
T5	(United States) Tony Manero
T5	(United States) Gene Sarazen
T5	(United States) Craig Wood

== Final eight bracket ==
Quarter-finals; December 5
Leo Diegel	3&2
Gene Sarazen
Walter Hagen	6&5
Tony Manero
Johnny Farrell	37h
Craig Wood
Al Watrous	2up
Al Espinosa

Semi-finals; December 6
Leo Diegel	3&2
Walter Hagen
Johnny Farrell	6&5
Al Watrous

Finals; December 7
Leo Diegel	6&4
Johnny Farrell

== Final match scorecards ==
Morning

Hole	1	2	3	4	5	6	7	8	9	10	11	12	13	14	15	16	17	18
Diegel	4	3	4	4	5	3	4	5	4	5	5	5	5	4	5	3	4	6
Farrell	4	3	5	5	7	4	3	4	3	4	5	3	4	5	4	3	3	5
Leader	–	–	D1	D2	D3	D4	D3	D2	D1	D1	D2	D1	D1	D1	D1	D1	–	F1

Afternoon

Hole	1	2	3	4	5	6	7	8	9	10	11	12	13	14	15	16	17	18
Diegel	3	3	4	4	5	3	4	4	4	3	5	3	3	4	Diegel wins 6 and 4			
Farrell	5	3	4	5	4	4	4	4	5	5	5	4	4	5	Diegel wins 6 and 4			
Leader	–	–	–	D1	–	D1	D1	D1	D2	D3	D3	D4	D5	D6	Diegel wins 6 and 4			
