= Walter Hagen =

American professional golfer (1892–1969)

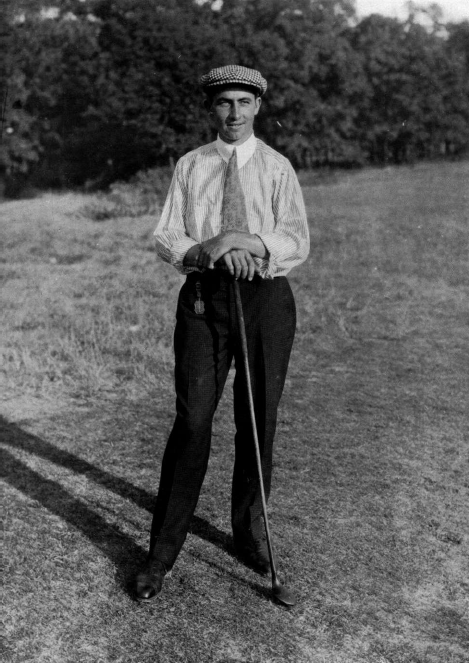
- Hagen in 1914

Personal information
- Full name: Walter Charles Hagen
- Nicknames: Sir Walter, The Haig
- Nationality: United States
- Born: December 21, 1892 Rochester, New York, U.S.
- Died: October 6, 1969 (aged 76) Traverse City, Michigan, U.S.
- Height: 5 ft 10.5 in (1.79 m)
- Weight: 185 lb (84 kg; 13.2 st)
- Spouses: Margaret Johnson (m. 1917–1921); Edna Crosby Straus (m. 1923–1937)
- Children: 1

Career
- Sport: Golf
- Turned professional: 1912
- Former tour: PGA Tour
- Professional wins: 58

Number of wins by tour
- PGA Tour: 44 (9th all time)
- Other: 14

Best results in major championships (wins: 11)
- Masters Tournament: T11: 1936
- PGA Championship: Won: 1921, 1924, 1925, 1926, 1927
- U.S. Open: Won: 1914, 1919
- The Open Championship: Won: 1922, 1924, 1928, 1929

Achievements and awards
- World Golf Hall of Fame: 1974 (member page)

Walter Charles Hagen (December 21, 1892 – October 6, 1969) was an American professional golfer and a major figure in golf in the first half of the 20th century. His tally of 11 professional majors is third behind Jack Nicklaus (18) and Tiger Woods (15). Known as the "father of professional golf," he brought publicity, prestige, big prize money, and lucrative endorsements to the sport. Hagen is rated one of the greatest golfers ever.

Hagen won the U.S. Open twice, and in 1922 he became the first native-born American to win The Open Championship, and won the Claret Jug three more times. He also won the PGA Championship a record-tying five times (all in match play), and the Western Open five times when it had near-major championship status. Hagen totaled 44 PGA wins in his career, and was a six-time Ryder Cup captain.

== Early life ==
Born in Rochester, New York, Hagen came from a working-class family of German descent. His parents were William and Louisa (Boelke) Hagen. His father worked as a millwright and blacksmith in Rochester's railroad-car shops. Walter was the second of William and Louisa's five children and the only son.

Hagen developed his golf game at the Country Club of Rochester, beginning as a caddie, and earned money to help support his family from pre-teen age. He earned ten cents per round and was occasionally tipped another five cents. Hagen played golf at every chance he got; caddie access to the course was limited to off-peak times, as it was elsewhere in the U.S. during that era. Hagen, with assistance from head professional Alfred Ricketts, gradually improved his golf skill to the stage where he was an expert player by his mid-teens, and was then hired by the club to give lessons to club members and to work in the pro shop.

== Professional career ==
He made his top-class professional debut at age 19 at the 1912 Canadian Open, placing 11th, a good showing. Hagen followed up with a surprise 4th place showing at the 1913 U.S. Open at Brookline where he stated that he was treated badly by the other professionals who knew nothing about him. Hagen said "they pushed me off the tee and told me I could practice when they were through". He vowed to play in the 1914 U.S. Open and "win it", and he did exactly that.

Hagen was also very skilled at baseball, primarily as a pitcher and shortstop. He canceled a 1914 tryout for the Philadelphia Phillies in order to play in a golf tournament. Later that week, Hagen was the U.S. Open Champion, and his career was changed forever.

Hagen was a key figure in the development of professional golf. He emerged in an era when the division between amateurs and professionals was often stark, with the amateurs having the upper hand in some sports, golf among them. This was especially true in Great Britain, the leading country in competitive golf when Hagen began his career.

Golf professionals were not allowed to partake of the facilities of the clubhouse, and were not allowed to enter the clubhouse by the front door. On one occasion, at the 1920 Open in Deal, Kent, Hagen hired a Pierce-Arrow car to serve as his private dressing room, because he was refused entrance to the clubhouse dressing room. He hired a chauffeur, and parked the expensive car in the club's driveway; this behavior raised a few eyebrows in class-conscious Britain.

On another occasion, he refused to enter a clubhouse to claim his prize because he had earlier been denied entrance. At the 1914 Midlothian Open he brazenly entered the clubhouse then mingled with the rich members who were delighted at which that episode permanently opened the doors.

The 1920 U.S. Open in Toledo marked a turning point; the players, encouraged by Hagen, donated a large grandfather clock to the host Inverness Club, in appreciation of the club allowing access for the professionals to their clubhouse during the tournament.

Hagen represented the Country Club of Rochester early in his professional competitive career; he was well supported by its members and management for his external competitive ventures. Beginning in 1918, Walter Hagen served as the first club professional at the now legendary Oakland Hills Country Club, in Bloomfield Hills, Michigan, northwest of Detroit. He worked for Oakland Hills until 1919, and then became the first touring professional unaffiliated with a club, a status he held alone for several years.

In 1924, Hagen was president and co-owner of the Bear Creek Golf and Country Club associated with Jack Taylor's Pasadena-On-The-Gulf development in St. Petersburg, Florida. Due to influence from the public, the name was changed to the Boca Ciega Golf and Country Club and ultimately the Pasadena Yacht and Country Club.

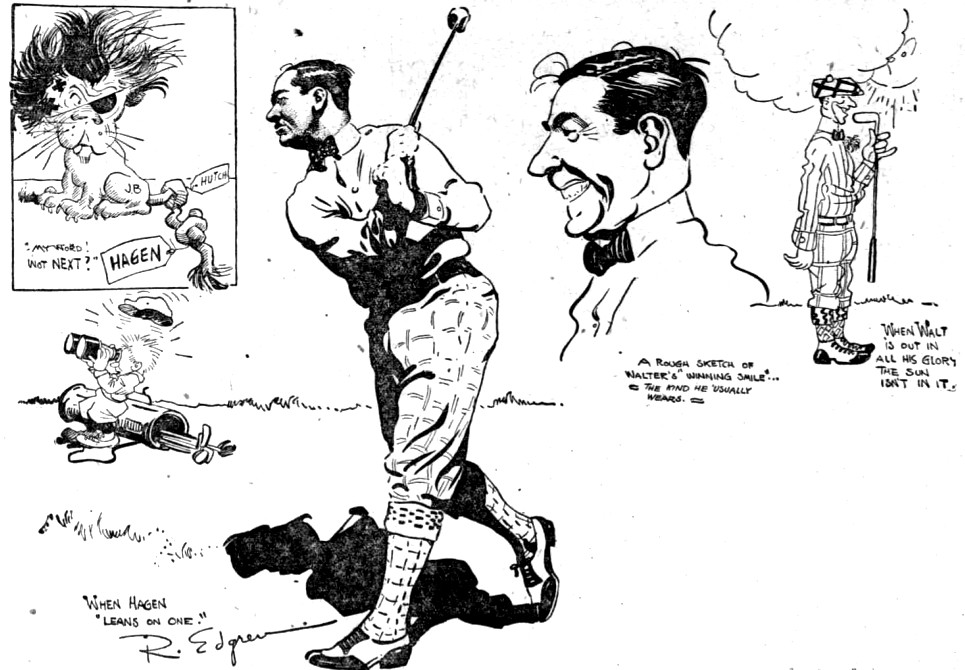
A sketch of Hagen by syndicated cartoonist Robert W. Edgren in 1922

Hagen was a dashing and assertive character who raised the status of professional golfers and improved their earnings as well. Throughout his career, he played hundreds of exhibition matches, all across the United States and around the world; these tours popularized golf to an immense degree. Hagen was also widely known for his dashing wardrobe while playing; this featured expensive tailored clothes in bright colors and plush fabrics. As one of the world's top players, Hagen found his skills were much in demand with this exhibition format, and concluded it was much more lucrative than playing most tournaments.

Hagen also made significant money endorsing golf equipment, and played a major role in helping to design clubs for Wilson Sports, which bore his name (either "Walter Hagen" or "Haig Ultra"). His work with Wilson produced some of the first matched sets of irons, around the same time that his great rival Bobby Jones was performing similar work for the Spalding company. The improved equipment expanded golf's appeal, brought high-quality clubs within the price range of many more players, and raised the standard of play.

Hagen was the first golfer to earn a million dollars in his career. He said he "never wanted to be a millionaire, just to live like one". Hagen once expressed his creed in these words: "Don't hurry, don't worry, you're only here for a short visit, so be sure to smell the flowers along the way." Gene Sarazen, who was ten years Hagen's junior commented, "All the professionals ... should say a silent thanks to Walter Hagen each time they stretch a check between their fingers. It was Walter who made professional golf what it is." On the notion of golf as a financial endeavor, Hagen wrote in his autobiography, "My game was my business and as a business it demanded constant playing in the championship bracket, for a current title was my selling commodity."

== Death ==
Hagen battled throat cancer for over four years and had several operations. Two years before his death, he was honored with a testimonial dinner in August 1967 in Traverse City, Michigan, attended by major champions Arnold Palmer and Cary Middlecoff. A month earlier at the PGA Championship in Colorado, he expressed support for Palmer, saying he was a member of "Arnie's Army."

Hagen died in 1969 at age 76 at his home in Traverse City, and now rests at the Holy Sepulchre Mausoleum in Southfield, Michigan, next to his grandson. His pall bearers included Palmer.

== Awards and honors ==
- Hagen was inducted into the World Golf Hall of Fame, in the charter class of 1974
- In 2000, Hagen was ranked as the seventh greatest golfer of all time by Golf Digest magazine
- In 2010, Hagen was ranked as the eighth greatest player of all time by Sports Illustrated / Golf Magazine

== Legacy ==
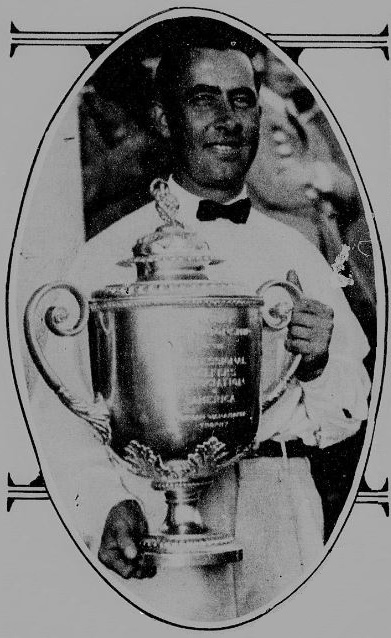
1921 PGA Champion

Major victories:

- U.S. Open: 1914, 1919
- The Open: 1922, 1924, 1928, 1929
- PGA Championship: 1921, 1924, 1925, 1926, 1927

There is some debate among golf historians as to whether Hagen should actually be credited with more major championships, as the Western Open in particular, and both the Canadian Open and Metropolitan Open were considered majors prior to the foundation and recognition of the Masters Tournament as one. Counting the Western Open, which he won five times (1916, 1921, 1926, 1927, and 1932), would put Hagen at 16 major titles, second only to Jack Nicklaus and one ahead of Tiger Woods (however, counting the U.S. Amateur, which is no longer considered a major championship, Woods' three U.S. Amateurs titles give him a total of 18, two behind Nicklaus's 20.).

Hagen captained the United States in the first six Ryder Cups, and played on the first five U.S. teams: 1927, 1929, 1931, 1933, and 1935.

Hagen has been portrayed by Bruce McGill in the 2001 movie The Legend of Bagger Vance, and by British actor Jeremy Northam in the 2004 Bobby Jones biopic Bobby Jones: Stroke of Genius.

== Professional wins (58) ==
=== PGA Tour wins (44) ===
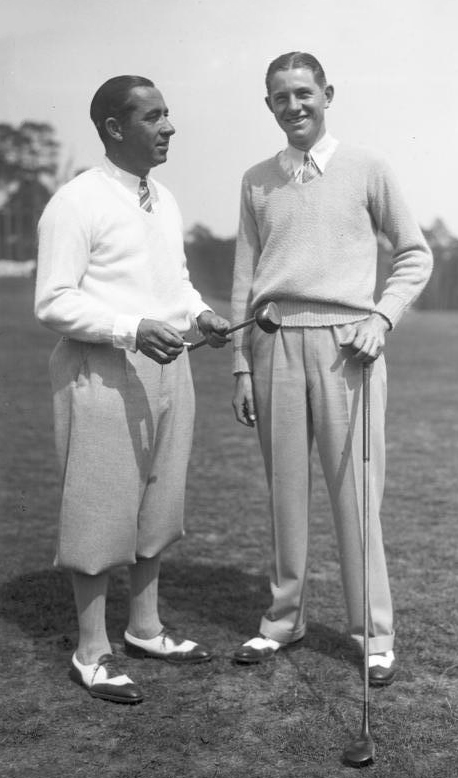
Hagen and Horton Smith in 1929

- 1916 (3) Metropolitan Open, Shawnee Open, Western Open
- 1918 (1) North and South Open
- 1919 (2) **U.S. Open**, Metropolitan Open
- 1920 (3) Florida West Coast Open, Metropolitan Open, Bellevue Country Club Open
- 1921 (2) Western Open, **PGA Championship**
- 1922 (4) Deland Open Championship, Florida West Coast Open, White Sulphur Springs Open, **British Open**
- 1923 (5) Texas Open, Florida West Coast Open, Asheville-Biltmore Open Championship, North and South Open, Kansas Mid-Continent Pro Championship (tie with Joe Kirkwood, Sr.)
- 1924 (5) North and South Open, Metropolitan PGA, **British Open**, **PGA Championship**, Princess Anne C.C. Open
- 1925 (1) **PGA Championship**
- 1926 (4) Florida West Coast Open, Eastern Open Championship, Western Open, **PGA Championship**
- 1927 (2) Western Open, **PGA Championship**
- 1928 (2) **British Open**, Long Beach Open (December)
- 1929 (3) Miami International Four-Ball (with Leo Diegel), **British Open**, Great Lakes Open
- 1931 (2) Coral Gables Open (tie with Henry Ciuci), Canadian Open
- 1932 (2) Western Open, St. Louis Open
- 1933 (1) Tournament of the Gardens Open
- 1935 (1) Gasparilla Open-Tampa
- 1936 (1) Inverness Invitational Four-Ball (with Ky Laffoon)

Major championships are shown in bold.

=== Other wins (14) ===
(This list is incomplete)

- 1914 **U.S. Open,** Professional and Amateur Four Ball Invitational, Pinehurst Amateur-Pro
- 1915 Massachusetts Open, California State Open, Panama Exposition Open
- 1920 French Open
- 1921 Michigan Open
- 1922 New York Open
- 1923 Long Beach Open
- 1924 Belgian Open
- 1929 Virginia Beach Open
- 1930 Michigan PGA Championship
- 1931 Michigan PGA Championship

== Major championships ==
=== Wins (11) ===
Year	Championship	54 holes	Winning score	Margin	Runner-up
1914	U.S. Open	2 shot lead	+2 (68-74-75-73=290)	1 stroke	(United States) Chick Evans
1919	U.S. Open (2)	5 shot deficit	+17 (78-73-75-75=301)	Playoff ^{1}	(United States) Mike Brady
1921	PGA Championship	n/a	3 & 2		(England) Jim Barnes
1922	The Open Championship	2 shot deficit	(76-73-79-72=300)	1 stroke	(England) Jim Barnes
1924	The Open Championship (2)	Tied for lead	(77-73-74-77=301)	1 stroke	(England) Ernest Whitcombe
1924	PGA Championship (2)	n/a	2 up		(England) Jim Barnes
1925	PGA Championship (3)	n/a	6 & 5		(United States) William Mehlhorn
1926	PGA Championship (4)	n/a	5 & 3		(United States) Leo Diegel
1927	PGA Championship (5)	n/a	1 up		(United States) Joe Turnesa
1928	The Open Championship (3)	1 shot lead	(75-73-72-72=292)	2 strokes	(United States) Gene Sarazen
1929	The Open Championship (4)	4 shot lead	+12 (75-67-75-75=292)	6 strokes	(United States) Johnny Farrell

Note: The PGA Championship was match play until 1958
^{1} Defeated Mike Brady in an 18-hole playoff – Hagen 77 (+6), Brady 78 (+7)

=== Results timeline ===
Tournament	1913	1914	1915	1916	1917	1918	1919
U.S. Open	T4	1	T10	7	NT	NT	1
The Open Championship			NT	NT	NT	NT	NT
PGA Championship	NYF	NYF	NYF	SF	NT	NT	

Tournament	1920	1921	1922	1923	1924	1925	1926	1927	1928	1929
U.S. Open	11	T2	5	T18	T4	T5	7	6	T4	T19
The Open Championship	T53	T6	1	2	1		T3		1	1
PGA Championship		1		2	1	1	1	1	QF	SF

Tournament	1930	1931	1932	1933	1934	1935	1936	1937	1938	1939
Masters Tournament	NYF	NYF	NYF	NYF	T13	T15	T11			T33
U.S. Open	T17	T7	10	T4	T58	3	T33			
The Open Championship				T22				T26		
PGA Championship	DNQ	R32	R32		R32	R64	DNQ			R64

Tournament	1940	1941	1942
Masters Tournament	WD	WD	
U.S. Open	DQ		
The Open Championship	NT	NT	NT
PGA Championship	R16		DNQ

Win
Top 10
Did not play

NYF = tournament not yet founded
NT = no tournament
WD = withdrew
DQ = disqualified
DNQ = did not qualify for match play portion
R64, R32, R16, QF, SF = round in which player lost in PGA Championship match play
"T" indicates a tie for a place

Source for The Masters: www.masters.com

Source for U.S. Open: USGA Championship Database

Source for The Open Championship: www.opengolf.com

Source for PGA Championship: PGA Championship Media Guide

=== Summary ===
Tournament	Wins	2nd	3rd	Top-5	Top-10	Top-25	Events	Cuts made
Masters Tournament	0	0	0	0	0	3	6	4
U.S. Open	2	1	1	10	16	20	23	22
The Open Championship	4	1	1	6	7	8	10	10
PGA Championship	5	1	2	9	10	13	18	15
Totals	11	3	4	25	33	44	57	51

- Most consecutive cuts made – 31 (1913 U.S. Open – 1930 U.S. Open)
- Longest streak of top-10s – 15 (1923 PGA Championship – 1929 Open Championship)

== See also ==
- List of golfers with most PGA Tour wins
- List of men's major championships winning golfers
- List of golfers with most wins in one PGA Tour event
