= 1930 U.S. Open (golf) =

Coordinates: 44.915°N 93.38°W

Tournament information
- Dates: July 10–12, 1930
- Location: Edina, Minnesota
- Course: Interlachen Country Club
- Organized by: USGA
- Tour: PGA Tour
- Format: Stroke play − 72 holes

Statistics
- Par: 72
- Length: 6,672 yards (6,101 m)
- Field: 142 players, 69 after cut
- Cut: 156 (+12)
- Prize fund: $5,000
- Winner's share: ($1,000)

Champion
- (United States) Bobby Jones (a)
- 287 (−1)

Location in the United States
Location in Minnesota

The 1930 U.S. Open was the 34th U.S. Open, held July 10–12 at Interlachen Country Club in Edina, Minnesota, a suburb southwest of Minneapolis. Bobby Jones won his second consecutive and record-tying fourth U.S. Open title. Having already won the British Amateur and the British Open in June, Jones secured his third consecutive major title of the single-season at the U.S. Open. He completed the grand slam with a victory in late September at Merion in the fourth and final leg, the U.S. Amateur.

The 1930 U.S. Open was played in oppressive heat, and the first round on Thursday saw Macdonald Smith and 1927 champion Tommy Armour share the lead, with Jones a stroke behind. Jones was one-under through eight holes in his second round when he hit one of his most famous shots: the "lily pad shot." Jones was attempting to reach the par-5 9th in two shots when two spectators ran onto the fairway during his swing. He mishit the ball toward the lake where it fell about twenty yards short of dry ground. Incredibly, the ball skipped off a lily pad and onto the far bank, just thirty yards short of the green. Jones would get up-and-down for an unlikely birdie, one that only added to his growing legend. Jones finished the round with a 73, putting him at 144 in a tie for second, two strokes behind leader Horton Smith.

Jones took command over the final two rounds on Saturday; he shot 68 in the third round in the morning and started the final round with a front-nine 38. However, he ran into trouble with a bogey at 12 and a double bogey at 13. Now leading Smith by only one shot, Jones birdied 14 and 16. After finding the water on 17 and settling for a bogey, he needed to two-putt from 40 feet (12 m) on the 18th for the championship. Instead, he holed out for birdie and a two-stroke victory over Smith, who claimed the $1,000 winner's share of the $5,000 purse as the top professional. In third place was 36-hole leader Horton Smith, who won the first edition of Jones' "Augusta National Invitation Tournament" in 1934, later known as the Masters Tournament, and again in 1936.

Jones became the first to successfully defend his Open title since John McDermott in 1911–12. He was now tied with Willie Anderson with four Open titles, but he would not attempt to win a fifth. Only four have won consecutive U.S. Opens since: Ralph Guldahl (1937, 1938), Ben Hogan (1950, 1951), Curtis Strange (1988, 1989), and Brooks Koepka (2017, 2018). After completing the Grand Slam with his U.S. Amateur win, Jones retired from competitive golf at age 28.

== Round summaries ==
=== First round ===
Thursday, July 10, 1930

Place	Player	Score	To par
T1	(United States) Tommy Armour	70	−2
T1	(United States) Macdonald Smith	70	−2
T3	(United States) Wiffy Cox	71	−1
T3	(United States) Bobby Jones (a)	71	−1
T5	(United States) Harry Cooper	72	E
T5	(United States) Walter Hagen	72	E
T5	(United States) John Rogers	72	E
T5	(United States) George Smith	72	E
T5	(United States) Horton Smith	72	E
T10	(United States) Olin Dutra	73	+1
T10	(United States) Jack Forrester	73	+1
T10	(United States) Irwin Ottman	73	+1
T10	(United States) Joe Turnesa	73	+1
T10	(United States) Eddie Williams	73	+1
T10	(United States) Craig Wood	73	+1

=== Second round ===
Friday, July 11, 1930

Place	Player	Score	To par
1	(United States) Horton Smith	72-70=142	−2
T2	(United States) Harry Cooper	72-72=144	E
T2	(United States) Bobby Jones (a)	71-73=144	E
T2	(United States) Charles Lacey	74-70=144	E
5	(United States) Macdonald Smith	70-75=145	+1
T6	(United States) Tommy Armour	70-76=146	+2
T6	(United States) Wiffy Cox	71-75=146	+2
T6	(United States) Johnny Farrell	74-72=146	+2
T9	(United States) Johnny Golden	74-73=147	+3
T9	(United States) Walter Hagen	72-75=147	+3

=== Third round ===
Saturday, July 12, 1930 (morning)

Place	Player	Score	To par
1	(United States) Bobby Jones (a)	71-73-68=212	−4
2	(United States) Harry Cooper	72-72-73=217	+1
T3	(United States) Johnny Golden	74-73-71=218	+2
T3	(United States) Horton Smith	72-70-76=218	+2
T5	(United States) Macdonald Smith	70-75-74=219	+3
T5	(United States) Johnny Farrell	74-72-73=219	+3
7	(United States) Craig Wood	73-75-72=220	+4
T8	(United States) Tommy Armour	70-76-75=221	+5
T8	(United States) Charles Lacey	74-70-77=221	+5
T9	(United States) Walter Hagen	72-75-76=223	+7
T9	(United States) Wiffy Cox	71-75-77=223	+7

=== Final round ===
Saturday, July 12, 1930 (afternoon)

Place	Player	Score	To par	Money ($)
1	(United States) Bobby Jones (a)	71-73-68-75=287	−1	0
2	(United States) Macdonald Smith	70-75-74-70=289	+1	1,000
3	(United States) Horton Smith	72-70-76-74=292	+4	750
4	(United States) Harry Cooper	72-72-73-76=293	+5	650
5	(United States) Johnny Golden	74-73-71-76=294	+6	550
6	(United States) Tommy Armour	70-76-75-76=297	+9	450
7	(United States) Charles Lacey	74-70-77-77=298	+10	350
8	(United States) Johnny Farrell	74-72-73-80=299	+11	250
T9	(United States) Bill Mehlhorn	76-74-75-75=300	+12	138
T9	(United States) Craig Wood	73-75-72-80=300	+12	138

(a) denotes amateur
