= 1936 Masters Tournament =

Tournament information
- Dates: April 3–6, 1936
- Location: Augusta, Georgia; 33.503°N 82.020°W
- Course: Augusta National Golf Club
- Organized by: Augusta National Golf Club
- Tour: PGA Tour

Statistics
- Par: 72
- Field: 53 players
- Cut: None
- Prize fund: $5,000
- Winner's share: $1,500

Champion
- (United States) Horton Smith
- 285 (−3)

Location map
- Location in the United States Location in Georgia

The 1936 Masters Tournament was the third Masters Tournament, held April 3–6 at Augusta National Golf Club in Augusta, Georgia.

Horton Smith won his second Masters, one stroke ahead of runner-up Harry Cooper, with defending champion Gene Sarazen in third. Still officially named the "Augusta National Invitation Tournament," the purse was $5,000 with a winner's share of $1,500.

Due to heavy rains, the first round of play was postponed until Friday. Sunday's play was also postponed and the third and fourth rounds were played on Monday. On the back nine of the final round, Smith chipped in for birdie from 50 feet (15 m) at the 14th hole, birdied the next hole, then parred out to win again.

Cooper led after each of the first three rounds in an attempt to become the first wire-to-wire winner at the Masters; that occurred at the 1941 edition, won by Craig Wood. After three rounds under par, Cooper shot 76 (+4) in the final round on Monday afternoon, with his bogey on the 17th hole proving decisive.

== Field ==
1. U.S. Open champions

Tommy Armour (3,10), Billy Burke, Johnny Farrell, Johnny Goodman (9,a), Walter Hagen (3,5,7,8), Bobby Jones (2,3,4), Fred McLeod, Sam Parks Jr. (5,7,8), Gene Sarazen (5,7,8), George Sargent

2. U.S. Amateur champions

Lawson Little (4,7,9), Jess Sweetser (4,a)

3. British Open champions

Jock Hutchison, Denny Shute (7,8)

4. British Amateur champions

5. Members of the U.S. 1935 Ryder Cup team

Ky Laffoon (8), Henry Picard (7,8), Johnny Revolta (7,10), Paul Runyan (7,8), Horton Smith (7,8), Craig Wood (7,8)

- Olin Dutra (2,7,8) did not play

6. Members of the U.S. 1936 Walker Cup team

- Team not selected in time for inclusion.

7. Top 24 players and ties from the 1935 Masters Tournament

Bobby Cruickshank (8), Johnny Dawson (a), Leo Diegel, Ed Dudley (8), Al Espinosa (8), Vic Ghezzi (8), Jimmy Hines, Ray Mangrum (8), Jug McSpaden, Byron Nelson, Joe Turnesa, Charlie Yates (a)

- Clarence Clark and Leo Diegel did not play.

8. Top 30 players and ties from the 1935 U.S. Open

Herman Barron, Harry Cooper, Vincent Eldred, Bill Kaiser, Butch Krueger, Gene Kunes, Ted Luther, Dick Metz, Jimmy Thomson, Ted Turner, Frank Walsh, Al Watrous (10)

- Mortie Dutra, Willie Hunter (4), and Macdonald Smith did not play.

9. 1935 U.S. Amateur quarter-finalists

Fred Haas (a), Jack Munger (a)

- Walter Emery (a), Chuck Kocsis (a), Joe Lynch (a) and George Voigt (a) did not play.

10. 1935 PGA Championship quarter-finalists

- Al Zimmerman did not play.

11. Two players, not already qualified, with the best scoring average in the winter part of the 1936 PGA Tour

Wiffy Cox, Orville White

12. Foreign invitations

Chin Sei-Sui, Jules Huot, Joe Kirkwood Sr., Robert Sweeny Jr. (a), Toichira Toda

Additional invitations

Albert Campbell (a), Bobby Riegel (a)

== Round summaries ==
=== First round ===
Friday, April 3, 1936

Rain on Thursday delayed the first round a day.

Place	Player	Score	To par
1	(United States) Harry Cooper	70	−2
2	(United States) Al Espinosa	72	E
T3	(United States) Billy Burke	74	+2
T3	(United States) Ted Luther (a)	74	+2
T3	(United States) Horton Smith	74	+2
T6	(United States) Bobby Cruickshank	75	+3
T6	(United States) Al Krueger	75	+3
T6	(United States) Ky Laffoon	75	+3
T6	(United States) Lawson Little	75	+3
T6	(United States) Henry Picard	75	+3

=== Second round ===
Saturday, April 4, 1936

Place	Player	Score	To par
1	(United States) Harry Cooper	70-69=139	−5
T2	(United States) Bobby Cruickshank	75-69=144	E
T2	(United States) Denny Shute	76-68=144	E
T4	(United States) Al Espinosa	72-73=145	+1
T4	(United States) Ky Laffoon	75-70=145	+1
T4	(United States) Paul Runyan	76-69=145	+1
T4	(United States) Gene Sarazen	78-67=145	+1
T4	(United States) Horton Smith	74-71=145	+1
T9	(United States) Johnny Dawson (a)	77-70=147	+3
T9	(United States) Vic Ghezzi	77-70=147	+3
T9	(United States) Byron Nelson	76-71=147	+3
T9	(United States) Henry Picard	75-72=147	+3

=== Third round ===
Monday, April 6, 1936 (morning)

Rain on Sunday postponed the final two rounds to Monday.

Place	Player	Score	To par
1	(United States) Harry Cooper	70-69-71=210	−6
2	(United States) Horton Smith	74-71-68=213	−3
3	(United States) Paul Runyan	76-69-70=215	−1
T4	(United States) Johnny Dawson (a)	77-70-70=217	+1
T4	(United States) Ray Mangrum	76-73-68=217	+1
T4	(United States) Gene Sarazen	78-67-72=217	+1
7	(United States) Bobby Cruickshank	75-69-74=218	+2
8	(United States) Denny Shute	76-68-75=219	+3
T9	(United States) Ed Dudley	75-75-70=220	+4
T9	(United States) Al Espinosa	72-73-75=220	+4
T9	(United States) Ky Laffoon	75-70-75=220	+4

=== Final round ===
Monday, April 6, 1936 (afternoon)

==== Final leaderboard ====
Champion
Silver Cup winner (low amateur)
(a) = amateur
(c) = past champion

Top 10
Place	Player	Score	To par	Money (US$)
1	(United States) Horton Smith (c)	74-71-68-72=285	−3	1,500
2	(United States) Harry Cooper	70-69-71-76=286	−2	800
3	(United States) Gene Sarazen (c)	78-67-72-70=287	−1	600
T4	(United States) Bobby Cruickshank	75-69-74-72=290	+2	450
T4	(United States) Paul Runyan	76-69-70-75=290	+2	450
T6	(United States) Ed Dudley	75-75-70-73=293	+5	250
T6	(United States) Ky Laffoon	75-70-75-73=293	+5	250
T6	(United States) Ray Mangrum	76-73-68-76=293	+5	250
T9	(United States) Johnny Dawson (a)	77-70-70-77=294	+6	0
T9	(United States) Henry Picard	75-72-74-73=294	+6	150

Leaderboard below the top 10
Place	Player	Score	To par	Money ($)
T11	(United States) Walter Hagen	77-74-73-72=296	+8	100
T11	(United States) Denny Shute	76-68-75-77=296	+8	100
T13	(United States) Wiffy Cox	82-69-75-72=298	+10	50
T13	(United States) Byron Nelson	76-71-77-74=298	+10	50
T15	(United States) Al Espinosa	72-73-75-79=299	+11	
T15	(United States) Vic Ghezzi	77-70-77-75=299	+11	
T15	(United States) Jug McSpaden	77-75-71-76=299	+11	
T15	(United States) Jimmy Thomson	76-78-71-74=299	+11	
T15	(United States) Orville White	78-73-77-71=299	+11	
T20	(United States) Tommy Armour	79-74-72-75=300	+12	
T20	(United States) Lawson Little	75-75-73-77=300	+12	
T20	(United States) Sam Parks Jr.	76-75-72-77=300	+12	
T20	(Taiwan) Chin Sei-Sui	76-74-71-79=300	+12	
T20	(United States) Craig Wood	88-67-69-76=300	+12	
25	(United States) Johnny Revolta	77-72-76-76=301	+13	
26	(United States) Albert Campbell (a)	82-73-68-79=302	+14	
27	(United States) Dick Metz	79-78-76-70=303	+15	
28	(United States) Billy Burke	74-77-74-79=304	+16	
T29	(United States) Johnny Farrell	78-75-74-78=305	+17	
T29	(Australia) Joe Kirkwood Sr.	81-76-73-75=305	+17	
T29	(Japan) Toichira Toda	81-74-75-75=305	+17	
T29	(United States) Al Watrous	78-76-73-78=305	+17	
33	(United States) Bobby Jones	78-78-73-77=306	+18	
T34	(United States) Bill Kaiser	77-78-77-75=307	+19	
T34	(United States) Charlie Yates (a)	82-73-75-77=307	+19	
T36	(United States) Butch Krueger	75-76-77-80=308	+20	
T36	(United States) Ted Luther	74-75-77-82=308	+20	
38	(United States) Ted Turner	76-79-80-75=310	+22	
T39	(United States) Jimmy Hines	79-82-74-76=311	+23	
T39	(Canada) Jules Huot	80-79-75-77=311	+23	
T39	(United States) Gene Kunes	81-76-76-78=311	+23	
T39	(United States) Frank Walsh	80-77-78-76=311	+23	
43	(United States) Johnny Goodman (a)	80-81-79-75=315	+27	
T44	(United States) Bobby Riegel (a)	84-78-74-83=319	+31	
T44	(England) Robert Sweeny Jr. (a)	83-75-74-87=319	+31	
WD	(United States) Jock Hutchison	79-77=156	+12	
WD	(United States) Vincent Eldred	85-76=161	+17	
WD	(United States) Fred Haas (a)	87-74=161	+17	
WD	(United States) Joe Turnesa	80-82=162	+18	
WD	(United States) Jack Munger (a)	84-79=163	+19	
WD	(United States) Jess Sweetser (a)	89-79=168	+24	
WD	(United States) Fred McLeod	88-81=169	+25	
WD	(United States) Herman Barron			
WD	(United States) George Sargent			

==== Scorecard ====
Hole	1	2	3	4	5	6	7	8	9	10	11	12	13	14	15	16	17	18
Par	4	5	4	3	4	3	4	5	4	4	4	3	5	4	5	3	4	4
(United States) Smith	−2	−2	−2	−2	−2	−2	−3	−2	−2	−1	−1	−1	−1	−2	−3	−3	−3	−3
(England) Cooper	−6	−5	−5	−4	−3	−3	−3	−4	−3	−3	−3	−3	−3	−3	−3	−3	−2	−2
(United States) Sarazen	+1	+2	+2	+2	+2	+3	+3	+2	+1	+1	+1	E	E	−1	−1	−1	−1	−1

Cumulative tournament scores, relative to par
