= 1926 U.S. Open (golf) =

Coordinates: 40.002°N 83.075°W

Tournament information
- Dates: July 8–10, 1926
- Location: Columbus, Ohio
- Course: Scioto Country Club
- Organized by: USGA
- Format: Stroke play − 72 holes

Statistics
- Par: 72
- Length: 6,736 yards (6,159 m)
- Field: 148 players, 63 after cut
- Cut: 159 (+15)
- Prize fund: $2,000
- Winner's share: $500; Awarded to runner-up

Champion
- (United States) Bobby Jones (a)
- 293 (+5)

Location in the United States
Location in Ohio

The 1926 U.S. Open was the 30th U.S. Open, held July 8–10 at Scioto Country Club in Columbus, Ohio. Noted amateur Bobby Jones, winner of the British Open two weeks earlier, won the second of his four U.S. Opens, one stroke ahead of runner-up Joe Turnesa.

After rounds of 70-79-71, Jones was three strokes behind third round leader Turnesa, who unraveled on the last nine on Saturday afternoon, with five bogeys in six holes. He managed to birdie the final hole for a 77 and 294 total for solo second (and the winner's share of the purse). Jones got off to a slow start, with bogeys at three of his first five holes, then birdied the 7th and ran off a streak of nine consecutive fours. Needing a par on the par-5 18th to tie (and force a playoff round), Jones hit a 310-yard (283 m) tee shot, then followed with an approach to the green, leaving 15 feet (4.5 m) for eagle. Two-putting for birdie, Jones carded a one-over 73 to best Turnesa by a stroke. Bill Mehlhorn opened with 68 on Thursday, and led after both of the first two rounds, but was ten over par on Saturday and was four strokes back, in a four-way tie for third.

Jones became the first player to win the U.S. Open and British Open in the same year, and he won both again four years later in 1930, during his grand slam year. Later double Open winners were Gene Sarazen (1932), Ben Hogan (1953), Lee Trevino (1971), Tom Watson (1982), and Tiger Woods (2000). While Turnesa never won a major, he did finish second twice and his brother Jim won the PGA Championship in 1952. Another brother, Willie, won the U.S. Amateur twice and the British Amateur once. In total, eight Turnesa brothers played on the PGA Tour.

This was also the first year since 1919 that the tournament was extended to three days, because of the number of entries and the size of the gallery. The first two rounds were now played over two days, Thursday and Friday, with a 36-hole cut. The final two rounds continued to be played on one day, Saturday. This format continued through 1964, except for the following year in 1927, when it was held Tuesday through Thursday (with a Friday playoff). The final round in 1959 was on Sunday due to weather delays.

Scioto was only ten years old at the time, and its club pro was George Sargent, the 1909 champion, who did not compete. It later hosted the Ryder Cup in 1931 and the PGA Championship in 1950. Scioto is also noteworthy as the club where Jack Nicklaus learned to play as a youth in the 1950s, under the tutelage of Jack Grout.

== Round summaries ==
=== First round ===
Thursday, July 8, 1926

Place	Player	Score	To par
1	(United States) Bill Mehlhorn	68	−4
T2	(United States) Bobby Jones (a)	70	−2
T2	(United States) John Junor	70	−2
T4	(United States) Al Espinosa	71	−1
T4	(United States) Joe Turnesa	71	−1
T6	(United States) J.G. Collins	72	E
T6	(United States) Pat Doyle	72	E
T6	(United States) Leo Diegel	72	E
T6	(Scotland) Willie Macfarlane	72	E
T6	(United States) Dan Williams	72	E

=== Second round ===
Friday, July 9, 1926

Place	Player	Score	To par
1	(United States) Bill Mehlhorn	68-75=143	−1
2	(United States) Joe Turnesa	71-74=145	+1
3	(United States) Dan Williams	72-74=146	+2
T4	(United States) Leo Diegel	72-76=148	+4
T4	(United States) George McLean	74-74=148	+4
T6	(United States) Jack Forrester	76-73=149	+5
T6	(United States) Bobby Jones (a)	70-79=149	+5
T8	(United States) Al Espinosa	71-79=150	+6
T8	(United States) Chick Evans (a)	75-75=150	+6
T8	(United States) Walter Hagen	73-77=150	+6
T8	(United States) John Junor	70-80=150	+6
T8	(United States) Willie Klein	76-74=150	+6

=== Third round ===
Saturday, July 10, 1926 (morning)

Place	Player	Score	To par
1	(United States) Joe Turnesa	71-74-72=217	+1
2	(United States) Bill Mehlhorn	68-75-76=219	+3
3	(United States) Bobby Jones (a)	70-79-71=220	+4
4	(United States) Willie Hunter	75-77-69=221	+5
5	(United States) Leo Diegel	72-76-75=223	+7
T6	(United States) Johnny Farrell	76-79-69=224	+8
T6	(United States) Walter Hagen	73-77-74=224	+8
8	(United States) Willie Klein	76-74-75=225	+9
T9	(United States) Tommy Armour	76-76-74=226	+10
T9	(United States) Macdonald Smith	82-76-68=226	+10
T9	(United States) Dan Williams	72-74-80=226	+10

=== Final round ===
Saturday, July 10, 1926 (afternoon)

Place	Player	Score	To par	Money ($)
1	(United States) Bobby Jones (a)	70-79-71-73=293	+5	0
2	(United States) Joe Turnesa	71-74-72-77=294	+6	500
T3	(United States) Leo Diegel	72-76-75-74=297	+9	188
T3	(United States) Johnny Farrell	76-79-69-73=297	+9	188
T3	(United States) Bill Mehlhorn	68-75-76-78=297	+9	188
T3	(United States) Gene Sarazen	78-77-72-70=297	+9	188
7	(United States) Walter Hagen	73-77-74-74=298	+10	90
8	(United States) Willie Hunter	75-77-69-79=300	+12	80
T9	(United States) Tommy Armour	76-76-74-75=301	+13	68
T9	(United States) Willie Klein	76-74-75-76=301	+13	68
T9	(United States) Macdonald Smith	82-76-68-75=301	+13	68
T9	(United States) Dan Williams	72-74-80-75=301	+13	68

Amateurs: Jones (+5), Evans (+14), Johnston (+21), MacDonald (+22), Shute (+28), Westland (+28).

==== Scorecard ====
Final round

Hole	1	2	3	4	5	6	7	8	9	10	11	12	13	14	15	16	17	18
Par	4	4	4	3	4	5	4	5	3	4	4	5	4	3	4	4	3	5
(United States) Jones	+5	+5	+6	+6	+7	+7	+6	+6	+6	+6	+6	+5	+5	+6	+6	+6	+6	+5
(United States) Turnesa	+2	+2	+3	+3	+4	+4	+3	+3	+2	+2	+2	+3	+4	+5	+5	+6	+7	+6
(United States) Melhorn	+3	+3	+4	+5	+6	+6	+6	+6	+6	+6	+7	+9	+8	+8	+8	+9	+9	+9

Cumulative tournament scores, relative to par

Eagle	Birdie	Bogey	Double bogey	Triple bogey+
