= 1934 U.S. Open (golf) =

Coordinates: 40.001°N 75.312°W

Tournament information
- Dates: June 7–9, 1934
- Location: Ardmore, Pennsylvania
- Course(s): Merion Golf Club; East Course
- Organized by: USGA
- Tour: PGA Tour
- Format: Stroke play − 72 holes

Statistics
- Par: 70
- Length: 6,694 yards (6,121 m)
- Field: 146 players, 65 after cut
- Cut: 155 (+15)
- Prize fund: $5,000
- Winner's share: $1,000

Champion
- (United States) Olin Dutra
- 293 (+13)

Location in the United States
Location in Pennsylvania

The 1934 U.S. Open was the 38th U.S. Open, held June 7–9 at Merion Golf Club in Ardmore, Pennsylvania, a suburb northwest of Philadelphia. Olin Dutra won his only U.S. Open, a stroke ahead of runner-up Gene Sarazen on the East Course. Dutra overcame an eight-stroke deficit after 36 holes to win his second major title; he won the PGA Championship in 1932.

Bobby Cruickshank opened the tournament with a pair of 71s, and had a three-stroke lead over Sarazen at the midway point. Sarazen shot a 73 in the third round to take a one-shot lead over Cruickshank. In the final round on Saturday afternoon, however, both Sarazen and Cruickshank were surpassed by Dutra, who took the lead with birdies at the 10th and 15th holes. Sarazen recorded a triple bogey on the 11th hole, while Cruickshank bogeyed five of the final seven holes. Despite a pair of bogeys to finish the round, Dutra's 72 (+2) and total of 293 (+13) was enough to secure the victory.

Dutra's victory was especially remarkable, as he had fallen ill before the tournament and spent three days confined to his hotel room. He lost fifteen pounds (7 kg) and could not practice for ten days. He was about to withdraw until his brother Mortie, who finished in 28th place, convinced him to play on. His 36-hole comeback from eight shots down was the largest in U.S. Open history until Arnold Palmer equaled it in 1960. From California, Dutra was the first U.S. Open champion born in the western United States.

Former caddies in Texas at the same course in Fort Worth, Ben Hogan and Byron Nelson played in their first major championship, and both missed the cut, shooting 158 and 162, respectively. Lawson Little finished as low amateur in 25th place; he won the title six years later in 1940 as a professional.

Merion Golf Club was affiliated with the Merion Cricket Club until 1941. This was the first U.S. Open at Merion, which hosted its fifth in 2013, all on the East Course.

== Course ==
East Course

Hole	1	2	3	4	5	6	7	8	9	Out	10	11	12	13	14	15	16	17	18	In	Total
Yards	360	555	195	595	425	435	360	367	185	3,477	335	378	400	133	443	395	445	230	458	3,217	6,694
Par	4	5	3	5	4	4	4	4	3	36	4	4	4	3	4	4	4	3	4	34	70

== Round summaries ==
=== First round ===
Thursday, June 7, 1934

Place	Player	Score	To par
T1	(United States) Wiffy Cox	71	+1
T1	(Scotland) Bobby Cruickshank	71	+1
T1	(England) Charles Lacey	71	+1
4	(United States) Gene Sarazen	73	+3
T5	(United States) Rodney Bliss	74	+4
T5	(United States) Henry Ciuci	74	+4
T5	(United States) Mortie Dutra	74	+4
T5	(United States) Willie Goggin	74	+4
T5	(United States) Paul Runyan	74	+4
T5	(United States) Jimmy Thomson	74	+4
T5	(United States) Horton Smith	74	+4
T5	(United States) George Von Elm	74	+4

=== Second round ===
Friday, June 8, 1934

Place	Player	Score	To par
1	(Scotland) Bobby Cruickshank	71-71=142	+2
2	(United States) Gene Sarazen	73-72=145	+5
3	(United States) Wiffy Cox	71-75=146	+6
T4	(United States) Leo Diegel	76-71=147	+7
T4	(United States) Rodney Bliss	74-73=147	+7
T4	(United States) Billy Burke	76-71=147	+7
T4	(United States) Horton Smith	74-73=147	+7
T8	(United States) Henry Ciuci	74-74=148	+8
T8	(Australia) Joe Kirkwood	75-73=148	+8
T8	(United States) Macdonald Smith	75-73=148	+8

=== Third round ===
Saturday, June 9, 1934 (morning)

Place	Player	Score	To par
1	(United States) Gene Sarazen	73-72-73=218	+8
2	(Scotland) Bobby Cruickshank	71-71-77=219	+9
3	(United States) Wiffy Cox	71-75-74=220	+10
T4	(United States) Olin Dutra	76-74-71=221	+11
T4	(United States) Ralph Guldahl	78-73-70=221	+11
T6	(United States) Harry Cooper	76-74-74=224	+14
T6	(United States) Billy Burke	76-71-77=224	+14
T8	(United States) Leo Diegel	76-71-78=225	+15
T8	(United States) Johnny Golden	75-76-74=225	+15
T10	(United States) Al Espinosa	76-74-76=226	+16
T10	(Australia) Joe Kirkwood	75-73-78=226	+16
T10	(United States) Butch Krueger	76-75-75=226	+16
T10	(United States) Johnny Revolta	76-73-77=226	+16
T10	(United States) Macdonald Smith	75-73-78=226	+16

=== Final round ===
Saturday, June 9, 1934 (afternoon)

Place	Player	Score	To par	Money ($)
1	(United States) Olin Dutra	76-74-71-72=293	+13	1,000
2	(United States) Gene Sarazen	73-72-73-76=294	+14	750
T3	(United States) Harry Cooper	76-74-74-71=295	+15	400
T3	(United States) Wiffy Cox	71-75-74-75=295	+15	400
T3	(Scotland) Bobby Cruickshank	71-71-77-76=295	+15	400
T6	(United States) Billy Burke	76-71-77-72=296	+16	300
T6	(United States) Macdonald Smith	75-73-78-70=296	+16	300
T8	(United States) Tom Creavy	79-76-78-66=299	+19	116
T8	(United States) Ralph Guldahl	78-73-70-78=299	+19	116
T8	(United States) Jimmy Hines	80-70-77-72=299	+19	116
T8	(United States) Johnny Revolta	76-73-77-73=299	+19	116

==== Scorecard ====
Hole	1	2	3	4	5	6	7	8	9	10	11	12	13	14	15	16	17	18
Par	4	5	3	5	4	4	4	4	3	4	4	4	3	4	4	4	3	4
(United States) Dutra	+11	+11	+11	+11	+11	+12	+12	+12	+13	+12	+12	+12	+12	+12	+11	+11	+12	+13
(United States) Sarazen	+8	+8	+9	+9	+9	+9	+9	+10	+10	+10	+13	+13	+12	+13	+13	+13	+13	+14
(Scotland) Cruickshank	+9	+9	+10	+10	+10	+10	+10	+10	+10	+10	+10	+11	+11	+12	+13	+14	+14	+15
(United States) Cox	+10	+10	+9	+10	+10	+11	+12	+12	+12	+12	+12	+14	+14	+14	+14	+14	+14	+15

Cumulative tournament scores, relative to par

Birdie	Bogey	Double bogey	Triple bogey+
