= 1930 PGA Championship =

Coordinates: 40.733°N 73.78°W

Tournament information
- Dates: September 8–13, 1930
- Location: Flushing, New York
- Course(s): Fresh Meadow Country Club (original course)
- Organized by: PGA of America
- Tour: PGA Tour
- Format: Match play - 5 rounds

Statistics
- Par: 70
- Length: 6,500 yards (5,940 m)
- Field: 32 to match play
- Cut: 158 (+18), playoff
- Prize fund: $10,300
- Winner's share: $1,000

Champion
- (Scotland) (United States) Tommy Armour
- def. Gene Sarazen, 1 up

Location in the United States
Location in New York
Location in New York City

The 1930 PGA Championship was the 13th PGA Championship, held September 8–13 in New York City at Fresh Meadow Country Club in Flushing, Queens. Then a match play championship, Tommy Armour defeated Gene Sarazen 1 up in the finals for the second of his three major titles.

Johnny Farrell and Horton Smith were co-medalists at 145 (+5) in the 36-hole stroke play qualifier on Monday. Two-time defending champion Leo Diegel lost in the second round to Harold Sampson in 38 holes, ending his bid for a third straight title. Runner-up Sarazen was the club pro at Fresh Meadow; he previously won the PGA Championship in 1922 and 1923.

During the 36-hole Monday qualifier, Diegel shot 81 in the morning round and was in danger of not advancing to match play. He followed up with a 69 (−1) in the afternoon and his 150 (+10) put him only five strokes behind the medalists, in a tie for 8th place, easily within the top 32. Starting in 1931, the defending champion was exempt from qualifying.

The course where this PGA Championship was played in Queens no longer exists. Designed by A. W. Tillinghast, it opened in 1923 and also hosted the U.S. Open in 1932, won by Sarazen. Under increasing development and tax pressure, the Fresh Meadow Country Club sold the property in 1946, which was developed as a residential neighborhood (the Fresh Meadows section of Queens). The club then purchased the property, clubhouse, and golf course of the defunct Lakeville Golf & Country Club in Lake Success, its current home.

== Format ==
The match play format at the PGA Championship in 1930 called for 12 rounds (216 holes) in six days:

- Monday – 36-hole stroke play qualifier
  - top 32 professionals advanced to match play
- Tuesday – first round – 36 holes
- Wednesday – second round – 36 holes
- Thursday – quarterfinals – 36 holes
- Friday – semifinals – 36 holes
- Saturday – final – 36 holes

== Final results ==
Saturday, September 13, 1930

Place	Player	Money ($)
1	(United States) Tommy Armour	1,000
2	(United States) Gene Sarazen	500
T3	(Australia) Joe Kirkwood	250
T3	(United States) Charles Lacey	250
T5	(United States) Al Espinosa	200
T5	(United States) Johnny Farrell	200
T5	(United States) Harold Sampson	200
T5	(United States) Horton Smith	200

== Final eight bracket ==
Quarter-finals; September 11
Tommy Armour	2&1
Johnny Farrell
Charles Lacey	4&3
Harold Sampson
Gene Sarazen	2&1
Al Espinosa
Joe Kirkwood	1up
Horton Smith

Semi-finals; September 12
Tommy Armour	1up
Charles Lacey
Gene Sarazen	5&4
Joe Kirkwood

Finals; September 13
Tommy Armour	1up
Gene Sarazen

== Final match scorecards ==
Morning

Hole	1	2	3	4	5	6	7	8	9	10	11	12	13	14	15	16	17	18
(Scotland) (United States) Armour	4	4	4	4	5	4	5	4	2	4	5	3	4	2	4	5	4	4
(United States) Sarazen	4	4	3	4	5	4	4	4	3	4	4	3	5	2	5	5	5	4
Leader	–	–	S1	S1	S1	S1	S2	S2	S1	S1	S2	S2	S1	S1	–	–	A1	A1

Afternoon

Hole	1	2	3	4	5	6	7	8	9	10	11	12	13	14	15	16	17	18
(Scotland) (United States) Armour	5	4	4	2	6	4	4	5	3	4	3	4	4	3	5	5	4	4
(United States) Sarazen	4	4	5	2	5	4	4	5	3	3	4	3	4	4	5	5	4	5
Leader	–	–	A1	A1	–	–	–	–	–	S1	–	S1	S1	–	–	–	–	A1
