= 1932 U.S. Open (golf) =

Coordinates: 40.733°N 73.78°W

Tournament information
- Dates: June 23–25, 1932
- Location: Flushing, New York
- Courses: Fresh Meadow Country Club (original course)
- Organized by: USGA
- Tour: PGA Tour
- Format: Stroke play − 72 holes

Statistics
- Par: 70
- Length: 6,815 yards (6,232 m)
- Field: 150 players, 72 after cut
- Cut: 160 (+20)
- Prize fund: $5,000
- Winner's share: $1,000

Champion
- (United States) Gene Sarazen
- 286 (+6)

Location in the United States
Location in New York

The 1932 U.S. Open was the 36th U.S. Open, held June 23–25 at Fresh Meadow Country Club in Flushing, New York, a neighborhood in the north-central part of the borough of Queens in New York City. Gene Sarazen won his second U.S. Open championship, and the fifth of his seven major titles, ten years after his first U.S. Open win. Earlier in the month, he won the 1932 British Open in England.

Sarazen began with rounds of 74 and 76, which left him five strokes behind co-leaders José Jurado and Philip Perkins. With a three-under-par back-nine in the third round, Sarazen carded an even-par 70 to get within a shot of Perkins after 54 holes. Perkins continued his solid play in the final round, shooting a 70 and a 289 total, while Bobby Cruickshank shot 68 to tie him. They were no match for Sarazen on this day, however, who carded a 66 (−4) to earn a three-stroke victory at 286.

Sarazen set several scoring records on his way to the Open title. His 66 in the final round set a new tournament record, and a champion did not shoot a better final round until Arnold Palmer closed with 65 in 1960. His 286 total tied the tournament record, while his 136 over the final 36 holes set a record that stood until 1983. Sarazen was certainly helped by his familiarity with the venue; he was club pro at Fresh Meadow for five years, from 1925 to 1930.

Four-time major champion Jim Barnes played his final major and finished in 55th place. Johnny Goodman won low-amateur honors at 14th; he went on to win the championship the following year, and remains the last amateur champion.

The course where this U.S. Open was played in Queens no longer exists. Designed by A. W. Tillinghast, it opened in 1923 and also hosted the PGA Championship in 1930, won by Tommy Armour. Under increasing development and tax pressure, the Fresh Meadow Country Club sold the property in 1946, which was developed as a residential neighborhood (the Fresh Meadows section of Queens). The club then purchased the property, clubhouse, and golf course of the defunct Lakeville Golf & Country Club in Lake Success, its current home.

Daily admission for the U.S. Open in 1932 was $2.20, or $5.50 for all three days.

== Course layout ==
Hole	1	2	3	4	5	6	7	8	9	Out	10	11	12	13	14	15	16	17	18	In	Total
Yards	437	395	391	188	578	428	412	435	143	3,407	385	413	155	448	219	424	587	373	404	3,408	6,815
Par	4	4	4	3	5	4	4	4	3	35	4	4	3	4	3	4	5	4	4	35	70

== Round summaries ==
=== First round ===
Thursday, June 23, 1932

Place	Player	Score	To par
1	(United States) Olin Dutra	69	−1
2	(United States) Leo Diegel	73	+3
T3	(Argentina) José Jurado	74	+4
T3	(United States) Gene Sarazen	74	+4
T5	(United States) Billy Burke	75	+5
T5	(United States) Lloyd Gullickson	75	+5
T5	(United States) Walter Hagen	75	+5
T8	(United States) Dave Hackney	76	+6
T8	(Australia) Joe Kirkwood Sr.	76	+6
T8	(United States) Walter Kozak	76	+6
T8	(England) Philip Perkins	76	+6

=== Second round ===
Friday, June 24, 1932

Place	Player	Score	To par
T1	(Argentina) José Jurado	74-71=145	+5
T1	(England) Philip Perkins	76-69=145	+5
3	(United States) Olin Dutra	69-77=146	+6
4	(United States) Leo Diegel	73-74=147	+7
5	(United States) Walter Hagen	75-73=148	+8
T6	(United States) Harry Cooper	77-73=150	+10
T6	(United States) Gene Sarazen	74-76=150	+10
T6	(United States) Craig Wood	79-71=150	+10
T9	(United States) Henry Ciuci	77-74=151	+11
T9	(United States) Clarence Clark	79-72=151	+11
T9	(United States) Vincent Eldred	78-73=151	+11
T9	(United States) Dave Hackney	76-75=151	+11
T9	(United States) Willie Klein	79-72=151	+11
T9	(United States) H.J. Sanderson	77-74=151	+11

=== Third round ===
Saturday, June 25, 1932 (morning)

Place	Player	Score	To par
1	(England) Philip Perkins	76-69-74=219	+9
T2	(Argentina) José Jurado	74-71-75=220	+10
T2	(United States) Gene Sarazen	74-76-70=220	+10
T4	(Scotland) Bobby Cruickshank	78-74-69=221	+11
T4	(United States) Leo Diegel	73-74-73=221	+11
T4	(United States) Olin Dutra	69-77-75=221	+11
T7	(United States) Wiffy Cox	80-73-70=223	+13
T7	(United States) Harry Cooper	77-73-73=223	+13
T9	(United States) Clarence Clark	79-72-74=225	+15
T9	(United States) Ed Dudley	80-74-71=225	+15
T9	(United States) Paul Runyan	79-77-69=225	+15

=== Final round ===
Saturday, June 25, 1932 (afternoon)

Place	Player	Score	To par	Money ($)
1	(United States) Gene Sarazen	74-76-70-66=286	+6	1,000
T2	(Scotland) Bobby Cruickshank	78-74-69-68=289	+9	700
T2	(England) Philip Perkins	76-69-74-70=289	+9	700
4	(United States) Leo Diegel	73-74-73-74=294	+14	500
5	(United States) Wiffy Cox	80-73-70-72=295	+15	450
6	(Argentina) José Jurado	74-71-75-76=296	+16	350
T7	(United States) Billy Burke	75-77-74-71=297	+17	175
T7	(United States) Harry Cooper	77-73-73-74=297	+17	175
T7	(United States) Olin Dutra	69-77-75-76=297	+17	175
10	(United States) Walter Hagen	75-73-79-71=298	+18	100
