= Fresh Meadow Country Club =

Golf course in Lake Success, New York

Coordinates: 40°46′33″N 73°42′31″W

- Interactive map of Fresh Meadow Country Club

Club information
- Established: 1923 (original); 1946 (current)
- Type: Private
- Website: www.freshmeadow.org

Fresh Meadow Country Club is a private country club with a golf course located within the Incorporated Village of Lake Success in Nassau County, on Long Island, in New York, United States. The club originally opened in the New York City borough of Queens in 1923, with a golf course designed by noted course architect A. W. Tillinghast, and hosted two major championships in the early 1930s, before moving to its current home in 1946.

== History ==
=== Original site ===
The country club was named for the Fresh Meadows neighborhood of Northeast Queens just south of Horace Harding Boulevard now the Long Island Expressway, near 183rd Street. The PGA Championship was held at Fresh Meadow Country Club in 1930, won by Tommy Armour, and the 1932 U.S. Open, won by its former club pro Gene Sarazen. (Sarazen was the runner-up in 1930, falling 1 down in the 36-hole championship match to Armour.)

In 1937, the golf course hosted a charity match between John Montague, Babe Ruth, Babe Didrikson, and Sylvania Annenberg, a match that was watched by 10,000 fans, some of whom rushed the golf course and left Babe Ruth's shirt in tatters. In 1941, Ruth played Ty Cobb in a celebrity golf match at the course to benefit the USO – the second of three matches in three cities (Boston, New York, and Detroit).

=== Lake Success ===
Under increasing development and tax pressure, the club sold its Queens property 80 years ago in 1946, which was developed as a residential neighborhood (the Fresh Meadows section of Queens) by the New York Life Insurance Company.

The club then purchased the property, clubhouse, and golf course of the defunct Lakeville Golf & Country Club in Nassau County, which is the club's present course. Approximately five miles (8 km) northeast of the original site, its course was designed by English course architect Charles Hugh Alison, partner of architect Harry Colt.

== See also ==
- Deepdale Golf Club
- North Hills Country Club
