= List of longest PGA Tour win streaks =

The following represents the golfers who have won at least three consecutive starts in PGA Tour events. The list relates to consecutive events that they played in; they generally missed some PGA Tour events during their streak. In some cases the players competed in and failed to win non-PGA Tour events in between these events.

Player	Year(s)
11 wins
(United States) Byron Nelson	1945
7 wins
(United States) Tiger Woods	2006–2007
6 wins
(United States) Ben Hogan	1948
(United States) Tiger Woods	1999–2000
5 wins
(United States) Tiger Woods	2007–2008
4 wins
(United States) Byron Nelson	1945–1946
(United States) Jack Burke Jr.	1952
(United States) Ben Hogan	1953
3 wins
(United States) Walter Hagen	1923
(Australia) Joe Kirkwood Sr.	1924
(United States) Bill Mehlhorn	1929
(United States) Horton Smith	1929
(United States) Paul Runyan	1933
(United States) Henry Picard	1939
(United States) Jimmy Demaret	1940
(United States) Ben Hogan	1940
(United States) Byron Nelson	1944
(United States) Sam Snead	1945
(United States) Ben Hogan	1946 (twice)
(South Africa) Bobby Locke	1947
(Australia) Jim Ferrier	1951
(United States) Billy Casper	1960
(United States) Arnold Palmer	1960
(United States) Arnold Palmer	1962
(United States) Johnny Miller	1974
(United States) Jack Nicklaus	1975
(United States) Hubert Green	1976
(South Africa) Gary Player	1978
(United States) Tom Watson	1980
(Zimbabwe) Nick Price	1993
(United States) David Duval	1997
(United States) Tiger Woods	2000
(United States) Tiger Woods	2001
(Fiji) Vijay Singh	2004
(Northern Ireland) Rory McIlroy	2014
(United States) Dustin Johnson	2017

Sources: 4+ wins, 3+ wins
