= 1929 Open Championship =

Coordinates: 56.043°N 2.823°W

Tournament information
- Dates: 8–10 May 1929
- Location: Gullane, East Lothian, Scotland
- Course: Muirfield

Statistics
- Par: 70
- Length: 6,693 yards (6,120 m)
- Field: 109 players, 64 after cut
- Cut: 157 (+17)
- Prize fund: £250
- Winner's share: £75

Champion
- (United States) Walter Hagen
- 292 (+12)

Location in Scotland
Location in East Lothian, Scotland

The 1929 Open Championship was the 64th Open Championship, held 8–10 May at Muirfield in Gullane, East Lothian, Scotland. Walter Hagen successfully defended his 1928 title, six strokes ahead of runner-up Johnny Farrell. It was Hagen's fourth win at the Open and his eleventh and final major title.

Qualifying was held 6–7 May, Monday and Tuesday, with 18 holes at Muirfield and 18 holes at the number 1 course Gullane, and the top 100 and ties qualified. Leo Diegel led the field with 144; the qualifying score was 162 and 109 players advanced.

Percy Alliss held the lead after the first round with a 69, while Leo Diegel matched that score in the second round to take the 36-hole lead. After a first-round 75, defending champion Hagen recorded an Open Championship record 67 in the second round on Thursday and was two back of Diegel. There was a change in the cut rule; players needed to be within fourteen strokes of the leader after 36 holes, but there was to be a minimum of sixty left in the field. The cut was at 157 (+17) and 64 advanced.

Windy conditions on Friday caused scores to soar over the final two rounds. Diegel shot 82 in the morning, with Alliss and Abe Mitchell at 76 and 78, respectively. Hagen finished with two rounds of 75 for 292. Diegel was a shot behind runner-up Farrell in third place, while Alliss and Mitchell shared fourth at 300.

Hagen, age 36, played the tournament just twice more, in 1933 and 1937, both following Ryder Cup matches in England. Six-time champion Harry Vardon, age 59, qualified for the Open for the final time and missed the cut by three strokes. Similar to 1928, this Open was played earlier than usual, in early May.

== Course ==
Hole	Yards	Par	Hole	Yards	Par
1	450	4	10	459	4
2	353	4	11	359	4
3	380	4	12	380	4
4	180	3	13	128	3
5	510	5	14	450	4
6	450	4	15	393	4
7	153	3	16	193	3
8	455	4	17	507	5
9	483	4	18	410	4
Out	3,414	35	In	3,279	35
Source:		Total		6,693	70

== Round summaries ==
=== First round ===
Wednesday, 8 May 1929

Place	Player	Score	To par
1	(England) Percy Alliss	69	−1
T2	(England) Jim Barnes	71	+1
T2	(United States) Leo Diegel	71	+1
T4	(United States) Ed Dudley	72	+2
T4	(United States) Johnny Farrell	72	+2
T4	Herbert Jolly	72	+2
T4	(England) Abe Mitchell	72	+2
T8	(Republic of Ireland) Michael Bingham	73	+3
T8	(United States) Bobby Cruickshank	73	+3
T8	(United States) Gene Sarazen	73	+3
T8	(United States) Macdonald Smith	73	+3
T8	(United States) Al Watrous	73	+3
T8	(England) Tom Williamson	73	+3

=== Second round ===
Thursday, 9 May 1929

Place	Player	Score	To par
1	(United States) Leo Diegel	71-69=140	E
2	(United States) Walter Hagen	75-67=142	+2
3	(England) Abe Mitchell	72-72=144	+4
4	(England) Percy Alliss	69-76=145	+5
T5	(United States) Bobby Cruickshank	73-74=147	+7
T5	(United States) Johnny Farrell	72-75=147	+7
T5	(United States) Johnny Golden	74-73=147	+7
T5	(United States) Gene Sarazen	73-74=147	+7
T9	(United States) Tommy Armour	75-73=148	+8
T9	(England) Aubrey Boomer	74-74=148	+8
T9	(United States) Bill Mehlhorn	74-74=148	+8

=== Third round ===
Friday, 10 May 1929 (morning)

Place	Player	Score	To par
1	(United States) Walter Hagen	75-67-75=217	+7
2	(England) Percy Alliss	69-76-76=221	+11
T3	(United States) Leo Diegel	71-69-82=222	+12
T3	(England) Abe Mitchell	72-72-78=222	+12
5	(United States) Johnny Farrell	72-75-76=223	+13
6	(United States) Bobby Cruickshank	73-74-78=225	+15
7	(England) Archie Compston	76-73-77=226	+16
T8	(United States) Tommy Armour	75-73-79=227	+17
T8	(England) Mark Seymour	75-74-78=227	+17
T8	(United States) Al Watrous	73-79-75=227	+17

=== Final round ===
Friday, 10 May 1929 (afternoon)

Place	Player	Score	To par	Money (£)
1	(United States) Walter Hagen	75-67-75-75=292	+12	75
2	(United States) Johnny Farrell	72-75-76-75=298	+18	50
3	(United States) Leo Diegel	71-69-82-77=299	+19	25
T4	(England) Percy Alliss	69-76-76-79=300	+20	15
T4	(England) Abe Mitchell	72-72-78-78=300	+20	15
6	(United States) Bobby Cruickshank	73-74-78-76=301	+21	10
7	(England) Jim Barnes	71-80-78-74=303	+23	10
T8	(United States) Gene Sarazen	73-74-81-76=304	+24	10
T8	(United States) Al Watrous	73-79-75-77=304	+24	10
10	(United States) Tommy Armour	75-73-79-78=305	+25	10

Amateurs: Perkins (+32), MacKenzie (+33), Tolley (+33), Von Elm (+38)
