= Bobby Cruickshank =

Scottish professional golfer (1894–1975)

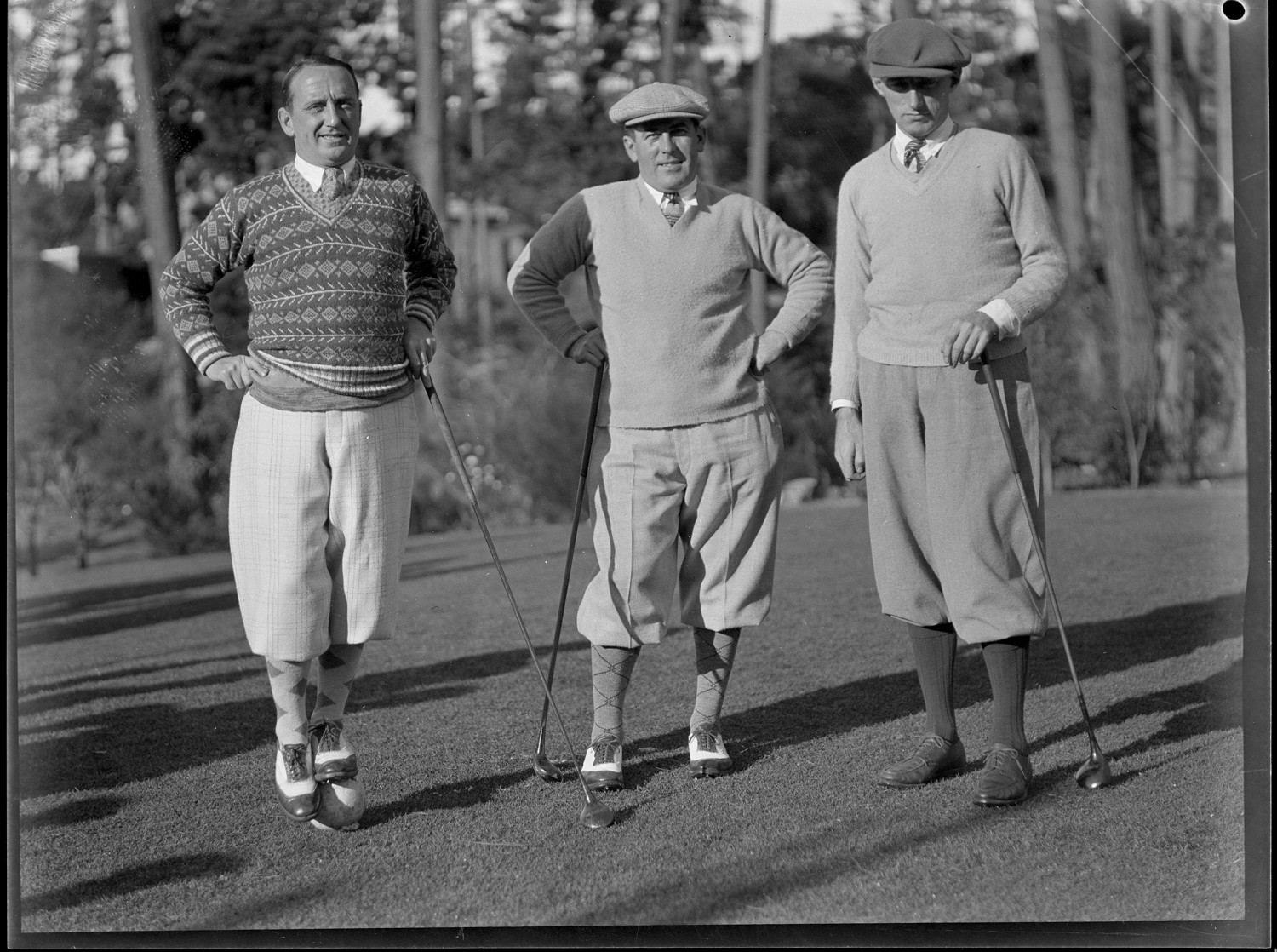
- Bobby Cruickshank, Johnny Golden, Tommy Armour

Personal information
- Full name: Robert Allan Cruickshank
- Nationality: Scotland
- Born: 16 November 1894 Grantown-on-Spey, Scotland
- Died: 27 August 1975 (aged 80) Delray Beach, Florida, U.S.
- Height: 5 ft 5 in (165 cm)
- Weight: 165 lb (75 kg; 11.8 st)
- Spouse: Helen "Nellie" Cruickshank
- Children: Elsie

Career
- Sport: Golf
- Turned professional: 1921
- Former tour: PGA Tour
- Professional wins: 29

Number of wins by tour
- PGA Tour: 16
- Other: 13

Best results in major championships
- Masters Tournament: T4: 1936
- PGA Championship: T3: 1922, 1923
- U.S. Open: 2nd/T2: 1923, 1932
- The Open Championship: 6th: 1929
- British Amateur: T33: 1920

Robert Allan Cruickshank (16 November 1894 – 27 August 1975) was a Scottish-born golfer who played primarily in the United States. He competed in the PGA of America circuit in the 1920s and 1930s, the forerunner of the PGA Tour. He was twice runner-up at the U.S Open.

== Early life ==
Born in Grantown-on-Spey in rural northern Scotland, Cruickshank learned his golf as a boy playing over the town's course. As a teenager he also worked there as a caddie.

In that era, country houses around Grantown-on-Spey were often rented to rich Edinburgh families for the summer. A wealthy widow named Mrs. Isabella Usher made an offer to Cruickshank's parents to provide an education for their two sons in Edinburgh. In the autumn of 1909, Cruickshank and his younger brother John moved south. Mrs. Usher became their legal guardian and they lived at her house in the city's Murrayfield district. They were educated at the nearby Daniel Stewart's College.

He was also becoming an outstanding golfer and met and became friends with another rising local golfer, Tommy Armour. Armour and Cruikshank played together regularly over the Braid Hills course. Bobby also became a member of Turnhouse Golf Club on the west of the city.

Cruickshank served in the British Army in World War I. Captured in action by the Germans, he was a prisoner of war and later successfully escaped.

== Amateur career ==
On returning from the war, Cruickshank won what was then Edinburgh's top amateur competition (the Edinburgh Coronation Cup) in both 1919 and 1920. The tournament was played at Braid Hills course which is still the city's premier municipal course. Representing his old school's former pupils (Stewart's FP Golf Club) Cruickshank was part of a team which won the Evening Dispatch Trophy. He also reached the final rounds of the British Amateur Championship played at Muirfield in the summer of 1920.

== Professional career ==
In 1921, Cruickshank turned professional and moved to the United States, as suggested by his mentor and friend, Tommy Armour. He rose to prominence in the U.S. after reaching the last four of the PGA Championship in both 1922 and 1923. He lost both times to eventual champion Gene Sarazen. Cruickshank was also twice runner-up in the U.S. Open. In 1923, he finished second to Bobby Jones down by two shots after an 18 hole playoff at Inwood Country Club, New York. In 1932, he was beaten by Gene Sarazen at Fresh Meadow Country Club, New York.

Cruickshank came home to Scotland to play at Muirfield in the 1929 Open Championship. Despite only bringing two clubs with him and borrowing the rest from the Gullane professional, he finished sixth. In a nod to his old school, Cruickshank wore his Stewart's College tie while playing in the second round of the championship. He won £10 for sixth place while that years "Champion Golfer", Walter Hagen, won £75.

Cruickshank won 17 tour events in his career and his greatest year was 1927, when he won the Los Angeles and Texas Opens and finished as the leading money winner for the year. His last victory on tour was in 1936 and he had 16 top-10 finishes in major championships.

Cruickshank was a club pro in Richmond, Virginia, in 1930s and 1940s, and later in Pittsburgh, Pennsylvania. He was also a winter pro in Florida.

== Personal life ==
Early in his adult life he was married to Helen.

Cruickshank died after a brief illness at age 80 in Delray Beach, Florida. His wife Nellie (1895–1965) died ten years earlier in Pittsburgh.

== Professional wins (29) ==
=== PGA Tour wins (16) ===
- 1921 (2) St. Joseph Open (as an amateur), New York State Open
- 1924 (1) Colorado Open
- 1926 (2) North and South Open, Mid-South Pro-Am Bestball
- 1927 (5) Los Angeles Open, Texas Open, South Central Open, North and South Open, Westchester Open
- 1928 (1) Maryland Open
- 1929 (1) Westchester Open
- 1934 (3) National Capital Open, British Colonial Open, Pinehurst Fall Pro-Pro (with Tommy Armour)
- 1935 (1) Orlando Open

=== Other wins (13) ===
this list may be incomplete

- 1925 Miami International Four-Ball (with Johnny Farrell)
- 1927 Miami International Four-Ball (with Tommy Armour)
- 1933 Virginia Open
- 1934 Virginia Open
- 1935 Virginia Open
- 1936 Virginia Open
- 1937 Virginia Open
- 1938 Mid South Pro/Pro (with Tommy Armour; tie with Henry Picard and Jack Grout)
- 1939 Virginia Open
- 1943 North and South Open
- 1945 Middle Atlantic PGA Championship
- 1949 Tri-State PGA Championship
- 1950 Tri-State PGA Championship

== Results in major championships ==
Tournament	1920	1921	1922	1923	1924	1925	1926	1927	1928	1929
U.S. Open		T26	T28	2	T4		T49	T11		T42
The Open Championship										6
PGA Championship		R16	SF	SF	R16	R16	R32	R32		
The Amateur Championship	R64									

Tournament	1930	1931	1932	1933	1934	1935	1936	1937	1938	1939
Masters Tournament	NYF	NYF	NYF	NYF	T28	T9	T4	17	T18	
U.S. Open		T36	T2	T43	T3	T14	CUT	3	T46	T25
The Open Championship								T42		
PGA Championship			QF	R16			R16			

Tournament	1940	1941	1942	1943	1944	1945	1946	1947	1948	1949
Masters Tournament	WD		T15	NT	NT	NT				
U.S. Open	CUT		NT	NT	NT	NT	T38			T42
The Open Championship	NT	NT	NT	NT	NT	NT			T32	
PGA Championship				NT						

Tournament	1950	1951	1952	1953	1954	1955	1956	1957
Masters Tournament								
U.S. Open	T25	CUT			CUT	CUT		CUT
The Open Championship								
PGA Championship		R64						

Top 10
Did not play

NYF = tournament not yet founded
NT = no tournament
WD = withdrew
CUT = missed the half-way cut
R64, R32, R16, QF, SF = round in which player lost in PGA Championship match play
"T" indicates a tie for a place

Source: British Amateur

== See also ==
- List of golfers with most PGA Tour wins
