= Charles Lacey =

English golfer (1906–1957)

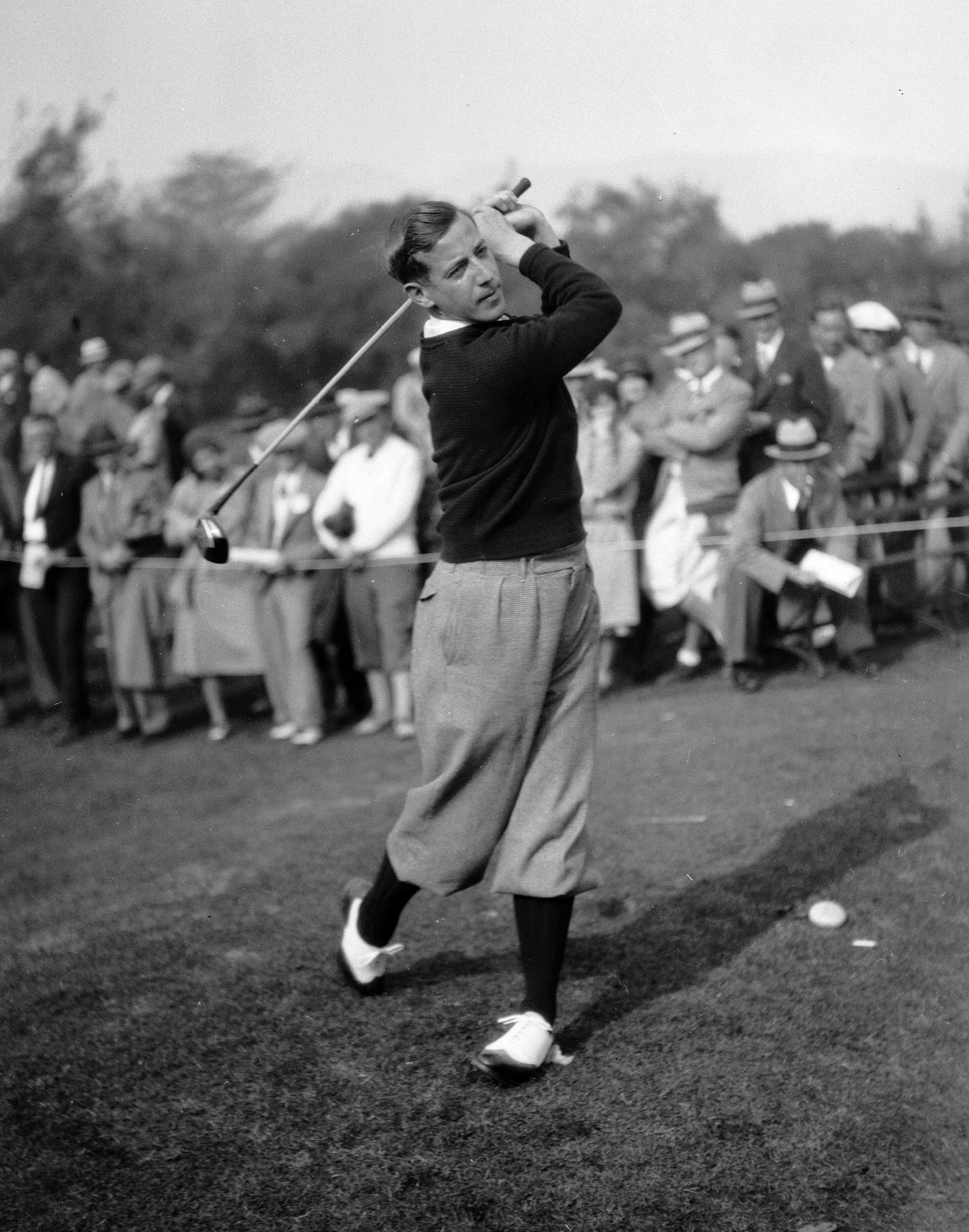
- Lacey at the 1934 U.S. Open

Personal information
- Nickname: Charley
- Nationality: England
- Born: July 3, 1906 Burnham, Buckinghamshire, England
- Died: October 8, 1957 (aged 51) Los Angeles, California, U.S.

Career
- Sport: Golf
- Status: Professional
- Professional wins: 2

Number of wins by tour
- PGA Tour: 1
- Other: 1

Best results in major championships
- Masters Tournament: 31st: 1934
- PGA Championship: T3: 1930
- U.S. Open: 7th: 1930
- The Open Championship: 3rd: 1937

Charles Lacey (July 3, 1906 – October 8, 1957) was a professional golfer who had a number of high finishes in major championships in the 1930s. Lacey won born in England but emigrated to the United States aged 20 and spent the rest of his career there.

== Early life ==
Lacey was the son of Arthur Lacey, the greenkeeper at Burnham Beeches Golf Club in Buckinghamshire. Arthur was also a golfer, winning the first competition of the Golf Greenkeepers' Association at Bushey Hall Golf Club in 1912 with scores of 80 and 79. Arthur later moved to Ifield, West Sussex.

Lacey had an older brother Arthur junior who was also a successful golfer.

== Professional career ==
In 1926, Lacey emigrated to the United States.

He spent part of the winters of 1933/34 and 1936/37 in England and played a number of exhibition matches, including some with his brother Arthur.

== Professional wins ==
=== PGA Tour wins (1) ===
- 1936 Long Island Open

=== Other wins ===
this list may be incomplete

- 1935 Long Island PGA Championship

== Results in major championships ==
Tournament	1930	1931	1932	1933	1934	1935	1936	1937	1938	1939	1940	1941
Masters Tournament	NYF	NYF	NYF	NYF	31							
U.S. Open	7	WD	T23	T43	T37		T40	T40	22			WD
The Open Championship								3			NT	NT
PGA Championship	SF		R32			R64						

NYF = tournament not yet founded
NT = no tournament
CUT = missed the half-way cut
WD = withdrew
"T" indicates a tie for a place
