= National Celebrities Open =

Golf tournament formerly on the PGA Tour

The National Celebrities Open and the National Capital Open were the names of golf tournaments on the PGA Tour that were played in the greater Washington, D.C. area in the middle part of the 20th century.

== Winners ==
Year	Winner	Venue	Location
National Celebrities Open
1954	Marty Furgol	Congressional Country Club	Bethesda, Maryland
1953	Ted Kroll	Woodmont Country Club	Rockville, Maryland
1952	Jimmy Demaret	Prince George's Country Club	Landover, Maryland
1952	Jimmy Demaret	Columbia Country Club	Chevy Chase, Maryland
National Capital Open
1948	Skip Alexander	Prince George's Country Club	Landover, Maryland
1947	Lloyd Mangrum	Prince George's Country Club	Landover, Maryland
1934	Bobby Cruickshank	Prince George's Country Club	Landover, Maryland
1933	Paul Runyan	Prince George's Country Club	Landover, Maryland
National Capital City Open
1932	Horton Smith	Prince George's Country Club	Landover, Maryland
