= Johnny Revolta =

American professional golfer (1911–1991)

Personal information
- Full name: John F. Revolta
- Nationality: United States
- Born: April 5, 1911 St. Louis, Missouri, U.S.
- Died: March 3, 1991 (aged 79) Palm Springs, California, U.S.
- Spouse: Lorene Revolta
- Children: 3

Career
- Sport: Golf
- College: None
- Turned professional: 1929
- Former tour: PGA Tour
- Professional wins: 29

Number of wins by tour
- PGA Tour: 20
- Other: 11

Best results in major championships (wins: 1)
- Masters Tournament: 13th/T13: 1935, 1937, 1952
- PGA Championship: Won: 1935
- U.S. Open: T8: 1934
- The Open Championship: T32: 1937

Achievements and awards
- PGA Tour leading money winner: 1935

John F. Revolta (April 5, 1911 – March 3, 1991) was an American professional golfer who played on the PGA Tour in the 1930s, 1940s, and early 1950s. He won a major title, the 1935 PGA Championship, and had 20 career wins on tour.

== Early life ==
Revolta was born in St. Louis, Missouri. His family relocated to Oshkosh, Wisconsin in 1923 when he was twelve. He learned the game as a caddie at the public course in Oshkosh and won the state caddie championship at age 14.

== Professional career ==
Like most professional golfers of his generation, Revolta started out as a club professional. He worked at Swan Lake Country Club in Portage in 1930, Chippewa Elks Golf Club in 1931, Riverside Country Club in Menominee, Michigan 1932–1933, and Tripoli Country Club in Milwaukee from 1934 to 1936. He won the Wisconsin State Open four times in a six-year period; he was not eligible for two years while working in Michigan. Revolta was a member of the PGA Tour from 1935 to 1952.

Revolta's best year as a tour pro was 1935, when he won five tournaments and led the PGA Tour's money list. He defeated Tommy Armour 5 & 4 in the PGA Championship held at Twin Hills Golf & Country Club and also won the Western Open, the era's "fifth major". He also played in the Ryder Cup in 1935 and 1937.

Revolta was known as the "Iron Master" because of his outstanding short game. Regarding his bunker play in particular, short game master Paul Runyan said Revolta "led the class [of outstanding bunker players] by a big margin. His skill from sand simply left me aghast." His instruction book, Johnny Revolta's Short Cuts to Better Golf, first published in 1949, is still in print today.

Revolta was the head professional at Evanston Golf Club in Skokie, Illinois, from 1935 to 1966, and continued to teach there during summers into the late 1980s.

== Personal life ==
In 1991, Revolta died in Palm Springs, California a month shy of his 80th birthday.

== Professional wins (29) ==
=== PGA Tour wins (20) ===
- 1933 (1) Miami Open
- 1934 (2) St. Paul Open, Wisconsin Open
- 1935 (6) Western Open, Sarasota Open, Wisconsin Open, **PGA Championship**, Inverness Invitational Four-Ball (with Henry Picard), Miami International Four-Ball (with Henry Picard)
- 1936 (2) Thomasville Open, Miami International Four-Ball (with Henry Picard)
- 1937 (2) Miami Biltmore Open, Miami International Four-Ball (with Henry Picard)
- 1938 (4) Sacramento Open, St. Petersburg Open, St. Paul Open, Columbia Open
- 1939 (1) Inverness Invitational Four-Ball (with Henry Picard)
- 1941 (1) San Francisco National Match Play Open
- 1944 (1) Texas Open

Major championship is shown in bold.

=== Other wins (9) ===
this list is probably incomplete

- 1930 Wisconsin State Open
- 1931 Wisconsin State Open
- 1936 Waterloo Open Golf Classic, Illinois PGA Championship
- 1937 Illinois PGA Championship
- 1938 Illinois PGA Championship
- 1941 Illinois PGA Championship
- 1944 Pro-Lady Victory National (with Patty Berg)
- 1947 Illinois PGA Championship

== Major championships ==
=== Wins (1) ===
Year	Championship	Winning score	Runner-up
1935	PGA Championship	5 & 4	(United States) Tommy Armour

Note: The PGA Championship was match play until 1958

=== Results timeline ===
Tournament	1928	1929
U.S. Open	WD	
The Open Championship		
PGA Championship		

Tournament	1930	1931	1932	1933	1934	1935	1936	1937	1938	1939
Masters Tournament	NYF	NYF	NYF	NYF	T18	T13	25	T13	T18	T31
U.S. Open				T15	T8	T36	T14	T28	T16	T22
The Open Championship								T32		
PGA Championship				R32	R16	1	R32	R32	R32	R16

Tournament	1940	1941	1942	1943	1944	1945	1946	1947	1948	1949
Masters Tournament	T27			NT	NT	NT		T29		T39
U.S. Open	T16	WD	NT	NT	NT	NT				
The Open Championship	NT	NT	NT	NT	NT	NT				
PGA Championship	R64			NT		R16		R64		

Tournament	1950	1951	1952	1953	1954	1955	1956	1957	1958	1959
Masters Tournament		T42	13	58	T60	T49	75	CUT	CUT	CUT
U.S. Open		T19	40	CUT	T29		CUT	T30		
The Open Championship										
PGA Championship					R16		R128			

Tournament	1960	1961	1962
Masters Tournament	CUT	CUT	CUT
U.S. Open		CUT	
The Open Championship			
PGA Championship		CUT	

Win
Top 10
Did not play

NYF = tournament not yet founded
NT = no tournament
WD = withdrew
CUT = missed the half-way cut
R64, R32, R16, QF, SF, F = round in which player lost in PGA Championship match play
"T" indicates a tie for a place

=== Summary ===
Tournament	Wins	2nd	3rd	Top-5	Top-10	Top-25	Events	Cuts made
Masters Tournament	0	0	0	0	0	6	21	15
U.S. Open	0	0	0	0	1	7	17	12
The Open Championship	0	0	0	0	0	0	1	1
PGA Championship	1	0	0	1	5	9	11	11
Totals	1	0	0	1	6	22	50	39

- Most consecutive cuts made – 24 (1933 U.S. Open – 1940 PGA)
- Longest streak of top-10s – 2 (1934 U.S. Open – 1934 PGA)

== See also ==
- List of golfers with most PGA Tour wins
- List of men's major championships winning golfers
