= Sacramento Open (PGA Tour) =

Golf tournament formerly on the PGA Tour

The Sacramento Open was a golf tournament on the PGA Tour from 1926 to 1938. It was held in Sacramento, California at two different courses. In the 1920s, it was played at the Del Paso Country Club. In the 1930s, it was played at a municipal course that is now part of the Haggin Oaks Golf Complex.

== Winners ==
- 1938 Johnny Revolta
- 1937 Ed Dudley
- 1936 Wiffy Cox
- 1935 Harold "Jug" McSpaden
- 1929-34 No tournament
- 1928 Tommy Armour
- 1927 No tournament
- 1926 Joe Turnesa

== See also ==
- Sacramento Open – a 1950s–60s LPGA Tour event
