= 1931 Ryder Cup =

Golf tournament in the United States

3rd Ryder Cup Matches
- Dates: June 26–27, 1931
- Venue: Scioto Country Club
- Location: Columbus, Ohio
- Captains: Walter Hagen (USA); Charles Whitcombe (Great Britain)
(United States)	9	3	(United Kingdom)
- United States wins the Ryder Cup

Location map
- Location within Ohio

The 3rd Ryder Cup Matches were held June 26–27, 1931 at Scioto Country Club in Columbus, Ohio. The United States team won the competition by a score of 9 to 3 points.

The course was the venue for U.S. Open in 1926, won by amateur Bobby Jones, the second of his four titles. It later hosted the PGA Championship in 1950. Scioto is also noteworthy as the club where Jack Nicklaus learned to play as a youth in the 1950s.

== Format ==
The Ryder Cup is a match play event, with each match worth one point. From 1927 through 1959, the format consisted of 4 foursome (alternate shot) matches on the first day and 8 singles matches on the second day, for a total of 12 points. Therefore, 6 1/2 points were required to win the Cup. All matches were played to a maximum of 36 holes.

== Teams ==
Prior to the match, there was some controversy about the qualification rules for the Great Britain team. In 1927 and 1929 the American PGA had decided to only select American born and resident players but the original Ryder Cup Deed of Trust made no such provision. All members of the Professional Golfers' Association were eligible. In late 1929 the Deed of Trust was revised requiring players to be born in and resident in their respective countries. This rule disqualified Percy Alliss and Aubrey Boomer, two of Great Britain's best players, as they had both taken jobs as club professionals in mainland Europe.

Team USA
Name	Age	Previous Ryder Cups	Matches	W–L–H	Winning percentage
Walter Hagen – captain	38	2	4	3–1–0	75.00
Billy Burke	28	0	Rookie
Wiffy Cox	34	0	Rookie
Leo Diegel	32	2	4	3–1–0	75.00
Al Espinosa	40	2	2	1–0–1	75.00
Johnny Farrell	30	2	4	2–1–1	62.50
Gene Sarazen	29	2	4	1–2–1	37.50
Denny Shute	26	0	Rookie
Horton Smith	23	1	1	1–0–0	100.00
Craig Wood	29	0	Rookie

In early 1931, it was announced that a selection committee of five would choose the Great Britain team for the 1931 Ryder Cup. This committee consisted of George Oke, Charles Whitcombe, Charles Corlett, Dick Wheildon and Albert Haskins. Charles Whitcombe was announced as the captain. An initial squad of 24 was announced.

Henry Cotton objected to a team rule requiring all players to travel out together and return together. Cotton wished to remain in the United States after the match. As a consequence Cotton was withdrawn from the squad.

Four trial matches were played in which the new American sized ball was used, and in early May a further six players were selected: Compston, Davies, Jolly, Mitchell, Robson and Ernest Whitcombe. Duncan and Easterbrook were later added. During the final day of The Open Championship, Cotton was again asked whether he would play under the original conditions but again declined and the following day Hodson was announced as the final selection. In a further statement the same day it was announced that Herbert Jolly had withdrawn because of a lack of form and had been replaced by Havers. Jolly had scored 84 and 78 in the Open Championship qualifying the previous week.

The British team sailed on June 10 following a farewell dinner the previous evening.

Team Great Britain
Name	Age	Previous Ryder Cups	Matches	W–L–H	Winning percentage
(England) Charles Whitcombe – captain	35	2	4	2–0–2	75.00
(England) Archie Compston	38	2	4	1–2–1	37.50
(England) Bill Davies	39	0	Rookie
(Scotland) George Duncan	47	2	4	2–2–0	50.00
(England) Syd Easterbrook	26	0	Rookie
(England) Arthur Havers	33	1	2	0–2–0	0.00
(Wales) Bert Hodson	25	0	Rookie
(England) Abe Mitchell	44	1	2	1–1–0	50.00
(England) Fred Robson	46	2	4	1–3–0	25.00
(England) Ernest Whitcombe	40	1	2	0–1–1	25.00

== Friday's foursome matches ==
	Results
Compston/Davies	(United States) 8 & 7	Sarazen/Farrell
Duncan/Havers	(United States) 10 & 9	Hagen/Shute
Mitchell/Robson	(United Kingdom) 3 & 1	Diegel/Espinosa
Easterbrook/E. Whitcombe	(United States) 3 & 2	Burke/Cox
1	Session	3
1	Overall	3

== Saturday's singles matches ==
	Results
Archie Compston	(United States) 7 & 6	Billy Burke
Fred Robson	(United States) 7 & 6	Gene Sarazen
Bill Davies	(United Kingdom) 4 & 3	Johnny Farrell
Abe Mitchell	(United States) 3 & 1	Wiffy Cox
Charles Whitcombe	(United States) 4 & 3	Walter Hagen
Bert Hodson	(United States) 8 & 6	Denny Shute
Ernest Whitcombe	(United States) 2 & 1	Al Espinosa
Arthur Havers	(United Kingdom) 4 & 3	Craig Wood
2	Session	6
3	Overall	9

== Individual player records ==
Each entry refers to the win–loss–half record of the player.

=== United States ===
Player	Points	Overall	Singles	Foursomes
Billy Burke	2	2–0–0	1–0–0	1–0–0
Wiffy Cox	2	2–0–0	1–0–0	1–0–0
Leo Diegel	0	0–1–0	0–0–0	0–1–0
Al Espinosa	1	1–1–0	1–0–0	0–1–0
Johnny Farrell	1	1–1–0	0–1–0	1–0–0
Walter Hagen	2	2–0–0	1–0–0	1–0–0
Gene Sarazen	2	2–0–0	1–0–0	1–0–0
Denny Shute	2	2–0–0	1–0–0	1–0–0
Craig Wood	0	0–1–0	0–1–0	0–0–0

Horton Smith did not play in any matches.

=== Great Britain ===
Player	Points	Overall	Singles	Foursomes
Archie Compston	0	0–2–0	0–1–0	0–1–0
Bill Davies	1	1–1–0	1–0–0	0–1–0
George Duncan	0	0–1–0	0–0–0	0–1–0
Syd Easterbrook	0	0–1–0	0–0–0	0–1–0
Arthur Havers	1	1–1–0	1–0–0	0–1–0
Bert Hodson	0	0–1–0	0–1–0	0–0–0
Abe Mitchell	1	1–1–0	0–1–0	1–0–0
Fred Robson	1	1–1–0	0–1–0	1–0–0
Charles Whitcombe	0	0–1–0	0–1–0	0–0–0
Ernest Whitcombe	0	0–2–0	0–1–0	0–1–0
