= Miami International Four-Ball =

Golf tournament

The Miami International Four-Ball was a golf tournament on the PGA Tour from 1924 to 1954. It was played primarily at what is now the Miami Springs Golf and Country Club in Miami, Florida. It was also played at the Miami Biltmore Golf Course in Coral Gables, Florida from 1939 to 1942 and at the Normandy Shore Club in Miami Beach, Florida from 1952 to 1954.

It was played with eight two-man teams in single elimination match play initially. It went to 16 teams in 1926 and to 32 teams in 1950. In 1954, 40 teams played in a 72-hole stroke play format.

== Winners ==
Miami Beach International Four-Ball

- 1954 Tommy Bolt and Dick Mayer
- 1953 No tournament
- 1952 Ted Kroll and Lew Worsham
- 1951 No tournament

Miami International Four-Ball

- 1950 Pete Cooper and Claude Harmon
- 1949 Jim Ferrier and Cary Middlecoff
- 1948 Jim Ferrier and Cary Middlecoff
- 1947 Jimmy Demaret and Ben Hogan
- 1946 Jimmy Demaret and Ben Hogan
- 1945 Harold "Jug" McSpaden and Byron Nelson
- 1943-44 No tournament due to World War II

Miami Biltmore International Four-Ball

- 1942 Chandler Harper and Herman Keiser
- 1941 Ben Hogan and Gene Sarazen
- 1940 Billy Burke and Craig Wood
- 1939 Ralph Guldahl and Sam Snead

Miami International Four-Ball

- 1938 Ky Laffoon and Dick Metz
- 1937 Henry Picard and Johnny Revolta
- 1936 Henry Picard and Johnny Revolta
- 1935 Henry Picard and Johnny Revolta
- 1934 Al Espinosa and Denny Shute
- 1933 Paul Runyan and Horton Smith
- 1932 Tommy Armour and Ed Dudley
- 1931 Wiffy Cox and Willie Macfarlane
- 1930 Clarence Gamber and Cyril Walker
- 1929 Leo Diegel and Walter Hagen
- 1928 Johnny Farrell and Gene Sarazen
- 1927 Tommy Armour and Bobby Cruickshank
- 1926 Bill Mehlhorn and Macdonald Smith
- 1925 Bobby Cruickshank and Johnny Farrell
- 1924 Bill Mehlhorn and Macdonald Smith
