= Florida Open =

Golf tournament

The Florida Open is the Florida state open golf tournament, open to both amateur and professional golfers. It is now organized by the Florida State Golf Association (FSGA). It has been played annually since 1942 at a variety of courses around the state. There were earlier "Florida Open"s played in the 1920s and 1930s, not associated with the current version, that are considered official PGA Tour events.

== Winners ==
- 2026 Michael Visacki
- 2025 J. C. Deacon
- 2024 Cristian DiMarco
- 2023 Connor Arendell
- 2022 Andy Pope
- 2021 Connor Arendell
- 2020 J. C. Deacon
- 2019 Sean Dale
- 2018 Gabriel Lench (amateur)
- 2017 J. C. Deacon
- 2016 Caleb Johnson, Jr.
- 2015 John Jonas (amateur)
- 2014 Caleb Johnson, Jr.
- 2013 Tyler McCumber
- 2012 Chase Seiffert (amateur)
- 2011 Rod Perry
- 2010 Ben Vertz (amateur)
- 2009 Thomas Murray (amateur)
- 2008 No tournament
- 2007 Travis Hampshire
- 2006 Camilo Benedetti
- 2005 Colby Beckstrom
- 2004 No tournament due to Hurricanes Frances and Jeanne
- 2003 Joe Alfieri
- 2002 No tournament
- 2001 Duke Donahue
- 1999–2000 No tournament
- 1998 Jimmy Stobs
- 1997 Jay Townsend
- 1996 Eric Brito
- 1995 Rodney Butcher
- 1994 Bart Bryant
- 1993 Jim Chancey
- 1992 Ronnie McCann
- 1991 Joey Rassett
- 1990 Dudley Hart
- 1989 Jim Ragland
- 1988 Bart Bryant
- 1987 Bruce Fleisher
- 1986 Mitch Adcock
- 1985 John Huston
- 1984 Ron Terry
- 1983 Larry Mowry
- 1982 Donnie Hammond
- 1981 Richard Blake
- 1980 Bruce Fleisher
- 1979 Larry Mowry
- 1978 Tony Valentine
- 1977 Rich Bassett
- 1976 Jim King
- 1975 Lee Wykle
- 1974 Charles Owens
- 1973 Billy Maxwell
- 1972 Ted Kroll
- 1971 Jim King
- 1970 Eddie Pearce (amateur)
- 1969 Gary Koch (amateur)
- 1968 Joe Lopez
- 1967 Bob Murphy
- 1966 Pete Cooper
- 1965 Tom Malone
- 1964 Howell Fraser
- 1963 J. C. Goosie
- 1962 Don Bisplinghoff (amateur)
- 1961 Don Bisplinghoff (amateur)
- 1960 Dub Pagan
- 1959 Howell Fraser (amateur)
- 1958 Pete Cooper
- 1957 Pete Cooper
- 1956 Dave Ragan (amateur)
- 1955 Don Bisplinghoff (amateur)
- 1954 Jim McCoy (amateur)
- 1953 Burl Bolesta
- 1952 Gardner Dickinson
- 1951 Lloyd Wadkins
- 1950 Pete Cooper
- 1949 Pete Cooper
- 1948 Pete Cooper
- 1947 Charles Harper
- 1946 Pete Cooper
- 1945 Burl Bolesta
- 1944 Pete Cooper
- 1943 Willie Turnesa (amateur)
- 1942 Lou Broward (amateur)

Previous tournaments under the same name

- 1931 Wiffy Cox and Joe Turnesa (tie)
- 1929 Horton Smith
- 1928 Henry Ciuci
- 1927 Billy Burke
- 1926 Johnny Farrell
- 1925 Leo Diegel
- 1922 George Kerrigan
- 1921 Jim Barnes
- 1911 Gilbert Nicholls
- 1906 Walter Travis
