= La Gorce Open =

Golf tournament formerly on the PGA Tour

The La Gorce Open was a golf tournament on the PGA Tour from 1928 to 1931. It was held at the La Gorce Country Club in Miami Beach, Florida. The purse each year was $15,000 with $5,000 going to the winner.

== Winners ==
Year	Player	Score	Ref
1928	Johnny Farrell	274	
1929	Horton Smith	289	
1930	Bill Mehlhorn	285	
1931	Gene Sarazen	282	
