= North and South Open =

Golf tournament

Tournament information
- Location: Pinehurst, North Carolina
- Established: 1902
- Courses: Pinehurst Resort, Course No. 2
- Par: 72
- Length: 7,007 yards (6,407 m)
- Tour: PGA Tour
- Format: Stroke play - 72 holes
- Prize fund: $7,500
- Month played: November (1945–1951); March
- Final year: 1951

Final champion
- (United States) Tommy Bolt

Location map
- Location in United States Location in North Carolina

The North and South Open was one of the most prestigious professional golf tournaments in the United States in the first half of the twentieth century. It was played at Pinehurst Resort in North Carolina, long the largest golf resort in the world, which also staged a series of other tournaments with the "North and South" name, some of which continue to this day.

The event ran from 1902 to 1951 and was won by many major champions, including three-time winners Walter Hagen, Ben Hogan, and Sam Snead. Played in March until 1944, the final seven events were held in early November. Hogan's win in 1940 at age 27 was his first as a professional; the winner's share was a thousand dollars.

It was cancelled when the professionals asked the patrician patriarch of Pinehurst, Richard Tufts, who was a great champion of amateurism, to increase the prize money in line with PGA Tour rates. The final tourney's purse was $7,500 in 1951, with a winner's share of $1,500. The Ryder Cup was held at the course the previous week, but only five of the nine on the winning U.S. team stayed to play.

== Winners ==
- 1902 Alec Ross
- 1903 Donald Ross
- 1904 Alec Ross (2)
- 1905 Donald Ross (2)
- 1906 Donald Ross (3)
- 1907 Alec Ross (3)
- 1908 Alec Ross (4)
- 1909 Fred McLeod
- 1910 Alec Ross (5)
- 1911 Gilbert Nicholls
- 1912 Tom McNamara (1)
- 1913 Tom McNamara (2)
- 1914 Gilbert Nicholls (2)
- 1915 Alec Ross (6)
- 1916 Jim Barnes
- 1917 Mike Brady
- 1918 Walter Hagen
- 1919 Jim Barnes (2)
- 1920 Fred McLeod
- 1921 Jock Hutchison
- 1922 Pat O'Hara
- 1923 Walter Hagen (2)
- 1924 Walter Hagen (3)
- 1925 Macdonald Smith
- 1926 Bobby Cruickshank
- 1927 Bobby Cruickshank (2)
- 1928 Billy Burke
- 1929 Horton Smith
- 1930 Paul Runyan
- 1931 Wiffy Cox
- 1932 Johnny Golden
- 1933 Joe Kirkwood, Sr.
- 1934 Henry Picard
- 1935 Paul Runyan (2)
- 1936 Henry Picard (2)
- 1937 Horton Smith (2)
- 1938 Vic Ghezzi
- 1939 Byron Nelson
- 1940 Ben Hogan
- 1941 Sam Snead
- 1942 Ben Hogan (2)
- 1943 Bobby Cruickshank (3) - event limited to players 38 and older and members of the armed services
- 1944 Bob Hamilton
- 1945 Cary Middlecoff - as an amateur
- 1946 Ben Hogan (3)
- 1947 Jim Turnesa
- 1948 Toney Penna
- 1949 Sam Snead (2)
- 1950 Sam Snead (3)
- 1951 Tommy Bolt

== See also ==
- North and South Men's Amateur Golf Championship
- North and South Women's Amateur Golf Championship
