= John Montague (golfer) =

American golfer (1903–1972)

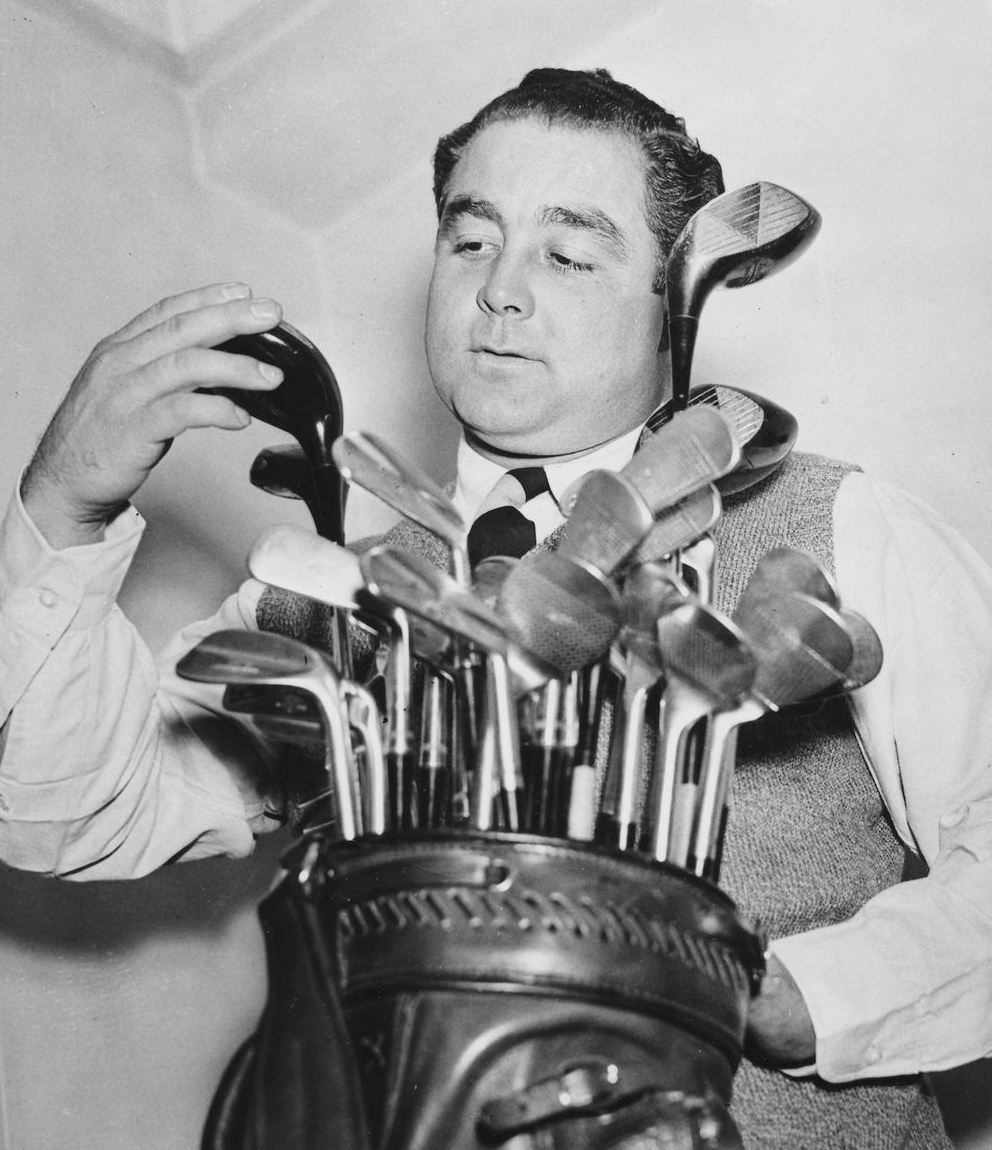
- Montague in 1937

Personal information
- Born: August 25, 1903 Syracuse, New York, U.S.
- Died: May 25, 1972 (aged 68) Studio City, Los Angeles, U.S.

Career
- Status: Amateur

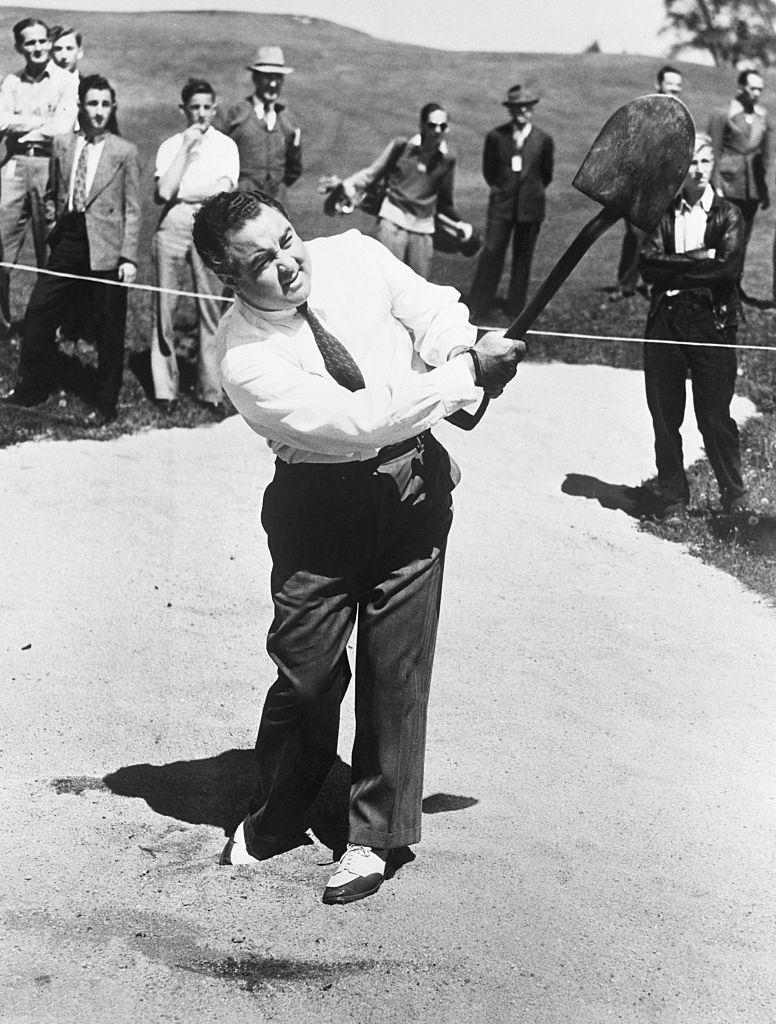
In 1939 Montague won a one-hole golf match against Bing Crosby, using a shovel, a baseball bat, and a rake instead of golf clubs

John Montague (August 25, 1903 – May 25, 1972) was an American golfer, who also played some minor-league baseball. Under the name LaVerne Moore, which was his original birth name, he was charged with armed robbery and assault over a 1930 case in upper New York State. He was acquitted in a 1937 trial.

Montague's life was covered in mystery and numerous stories about his extraordinary golf skills and physical strength. At the time of his arrest he lived with Esther Plunkett, and friends believed they were married. After leaving the jail, he could not regain his previous golf shape, due to gained weight and lack of practice. Hence he focused on his real estate business and private golf matches with celebrities. His 1937 charity game against Babe Ruth, Babe Didrikson, and Sylvania Annenberg drew approximately 10,000 spectators. Montague qualified for the 1940 U.S. Open, but performed poorly there. He died of heart problems, in obscurity, at a residence motel in Studio City, California.
