= Joe Turnesa =

American professional golfer (1901–1991)

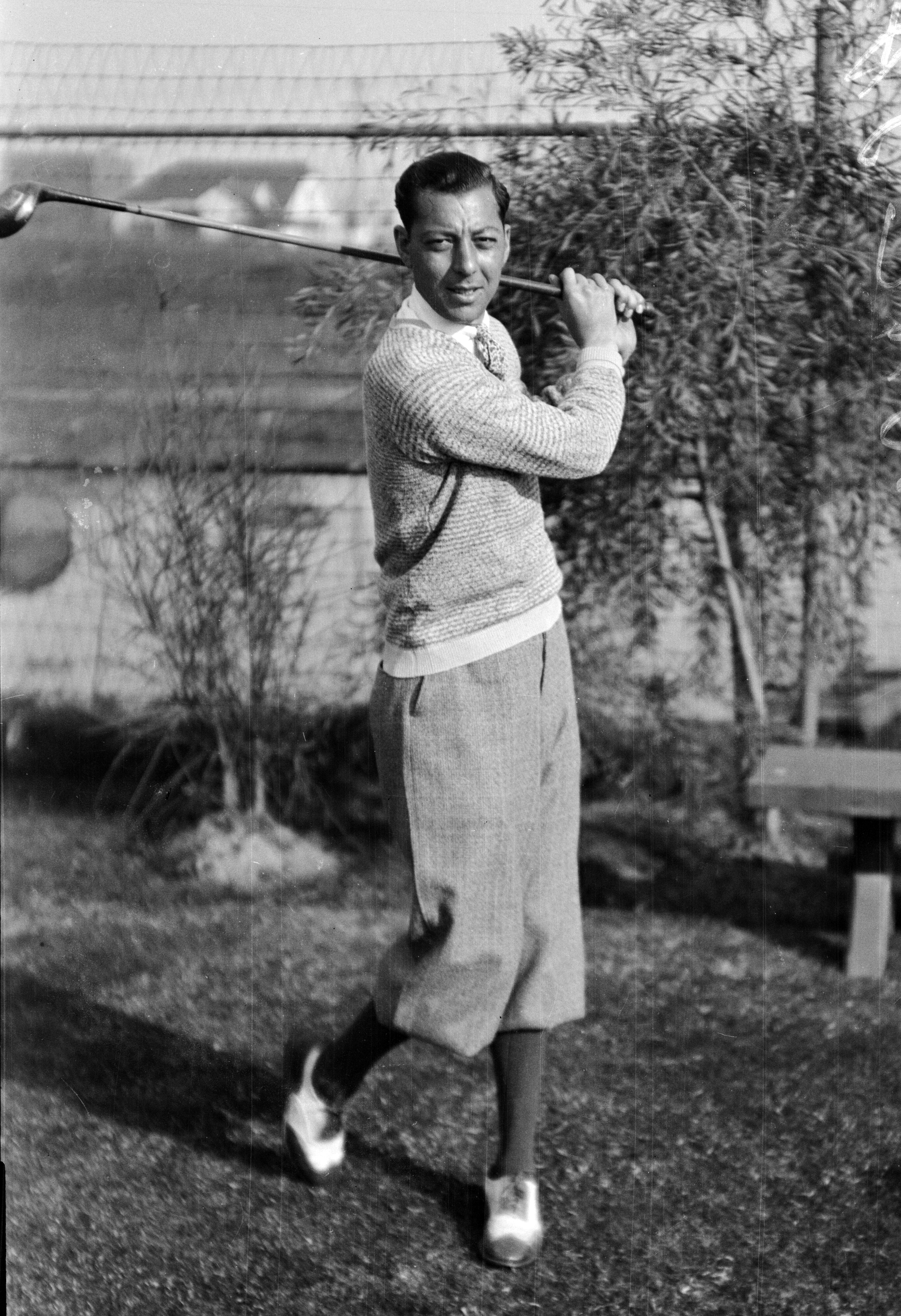

Personal information
- Full name: Joseph R. Turnesa
- Nationality: United States
- Born: January 31, 1901 New York, New York, U.S.
- Died: July 15, 1991 (aged 90) Florida, U.S.

Career
- Sport: Golf
- Turned professional: 1925
- Former tour: PGA Tour
- Professional wins: 22

Number of wins by tour
- PGA Tour: 14
- Other: 8

Best results in major championships
- Masters Tournament: T9: 1935
- PGA Championship: 2nd: 1927
- U.S. Open: 2nd: 1926
- The Open Championship: T25: 1929

Joseph R. Turnesa (January 31, 1901 – July 15, 1991) was an American professional golfer.

== Early life ==
Turnesa was born in New York, New York.

He was one of seven famous golfing brothers: Phil (1896–1987), Frank (1898–1949), Joe (1901–1991), Mike (1907–2000), Doug (1909–1972), Jim (1912–1971), and Willie (1914–2001).

== Professional career ==
Among his brothers, Joe won the most times (14) on the PGA Tour. The family was referred to as a "golf dynasty" in a 2000 New York Times article.

Turnesa finished second to Bobby Jones in the 1926 U.S. Open and second to Walter Hagen in the 1927 PGA Championship. He was a member of the U.S. Ryder Cup teams in 1927 and 1929.

== Personal life ==
Turnesa died in Florida in 1991.

== Professional wins ==
=== PGA Tour wins (14) ===
- 1924 (1) Augusta Open
- 1925 (2) Texas Open, Pennsylvania Open Championship
- 1926 (2) Metropolitan PGA Championship, Sacramento Open
- 1927 (3) Shreveport Open, Ridgewood Country Club Open, Sacramento Open
- 1929 (1) Lannin Memorial Tournament
- 1930 (2) Metropolitan PGA Championship, Massachusetts Open
- 1931 (1) Miami Open
- 1932 (2) Grassy Spain Course Tournament
- 1933 (1) Mid-South Open (tie with Willie Macfarlane and Paul Runyan)

=== Other wins (8) ===
Note: This list may be incomplete.

- 1929 Yorkshire Evening News Tournament,
- 1931 Florida Open (tie with Wiffy Cox)
- 1934 Long Island Open
- 1935 Connecticut PGA Championship
- 1936 Connecticut PGA Championship
- 1938 Long Island Open
- 1940 Long Island Open

== Results in major championships ==
Tournament	1923	1924	1925	1926	1927	1928	1929
U.S. Open	T14	T15	T11	2	T27	T6	CUT
The Open Championship							T25
PGA Championship				R32	2		

Tournament	1930	1931	1932	1933	1934	1935	1936	1937	1938	1939	1940
Masters Tournament	NYF	NYF	NYF	NYF	T34	T9	WD				
U.S. Open	T17	T32	T45	T46		WD	CUT				CUT
The Open Championship		CUT									NT
PGA Championship			R32			R64		R64		R64	R64

Top 10
Did not play

NYF = tournament not yet founded
NT = no tournament
WD = withdrew
CUT = missed the half-way cut
R64, R32, R16, QF, SF = round in which player lost in PGA Championship match play
"T" indicates a tie for a place

=== Summary ===
Tournament	Wins	2nd	3rd	Top-5	Top-10	Top-25	Events	Cuts made
Masters Tournament	0	0	0	0	1	1	3	2
U.S. Open	0	1	0	1	2	6	14	10
The Open Championship	0	0	0	0	0	1	2	1
PGA Championship	0	1	0	1	1	3	7	7
Totals	0	2	0	2	4	11	26	20

- Most consecutive cuts made – 8 (1923 U.S. Open – 1928 U.S. Open)
- Longest streak of top-10s – 2 (1927 PGA – 1928 U.S. Open)

== See also ==
- List of golfers with most PGA Tour wins
