= List of golfers with most PGA Tour wins =

This is a list of the fifty golfers who have won the most official (or later deemed historically significant) money events on the PGA Tour. It is led by Sam Snead and Tiger Woods with 82 each.

== Description ==
Many players won important events early in the 20th century, prior to the formation of the tour, with records being kept by the PGA of America. At various times, the PGA Tour has reassessed the status of some tournaments. In the 1980s, the significance of all historical tournaments was reassessed by golf historians, working together with PGA Tour staff, during the course of a major statistical research project. The Open Championship was first recognized as an official tour event in 1995, and in 2002, all victories in earlier Open Championships were classified as official PGA Tour wins.

Accumulating 20 wins is significant, because it is one of the requirements for "life membership" on the PGA Tour. This means that the golfer does not need to requalify for membership on the tour each year by finishing in the top 125 on the money list (starting in 2013, top 125 on the FedEx Cup points list), or through an exemption for tournament victories. Many golfers struggle to do this through their late-40s, but those with 20 wins avoid this problem. However, life members are required to maintain a certain (relatively modest) standard of play to retain their playing privileges: when they can no longer do so, they are moved into the "Past champions" membership category, effectively becoming honorary members.

Since 1975, only four players have won PGA Tour events after their 50th birthday, the age at which golfers become eligible to compete on PGA Tour Champions, the organization's professional senior tour: Craig Stadler won in 2003 at age 50, Fred Funk won in 2007 at age 50, Davis Love III won in 2015 at age 51, and Phil Mickelson won the PGA Championship in 2021 at age 50, becoming the oldest winner of a major. Sam Snead is the oldest to win a PGA event, at age 52, in 1965. Others who have won PGA Tour events past age 50 include Jim Barnes, John Barnum, and Art Wall Jr.

== List ==
The list is complete as of August 30, 2026.

(Players with the same number of wins are listed alphabetically. Players under 50 years of age are shown in bold. Members of the World Golf Hall of Fame are indicated by H.)

Rank	Player	Lifespan	Wins	Majors (Note: Major championship wins are counted using the modern definition of The Open Championship, the U.S. Open, the PGA Championship and the Masters Tournament.)	Winning span	Span (years)
T1	(United States) Sam Snead **H**	1912–2002	82	7	1936–1965	30
T1	(United States) Tiger Woods **H**	1975–	82	15	1996–2019	24
3	(United States) Jack Nicklaus **H**	1940–	73	18	1962–1986	25
4	(United States) Ben Hogan **H**	1912–1997	64	9	1938–1959	22
5	(United States) Arnold Palmer **H**	1929–2016	62	7	1955–1973	19
6	(United States) Byron Nelson **H**	1912–2006	52	5	1935–1951	17
7	(United States) Billy Casper **H**	1931–2015	51	3	1956–1975	20
8	(United States) Phil Mickelson **H**	1970–	45	6	1991–2021	31
9	(United States) Walter Hagen **H**	1892–1969	44	11	1916–1936	23
T10	(United States) Cary Middlecoff **H**	1921–1998	39	3	1945–1961	17
T10	(United States) Tom Watson **H**	1949–	39	8	1974–1998	25
12	(United States) Gene Sarazen **H**	1902–1999	38	7	1922–1941	20
13	(United States) Lloyd Mangrum **H**	1914–1973	36	1	1940–1956	17
14	(Fiji) Vijay Singh **H**	1963–	34	3	1993–2008	16
15	(United States) Jimmy Demaret **H**	1910–1983	31	3	1938–1957	20
T16	(United States) (Note: Harry Cooper was born in England, but grew up in Dallas, Texas, and became a U.S. citizen before starting his professional career. However, he was not allowed to compete for the U.S. in the Ryder Cup. U.S. citizens born outside the country, even if they were born with only U.S. citizenship, were not eligible to represent the U.S. in the Ryder Cup until 2002. Even today, those who naturalize after age 18 are ineligible for Team USA.) Harry Cooper **H**	1904–2000	30	0	1923–1939	17
T16	(Northern Ireland) **Rory McIlroy**	1989–	30	6	2010–2026	17
T16	(United States) Horton Smith **H**	1908–1963	30	2	1928–1941	14
T19	(United States) Gene Littler **H**	1930–2019	29	1	1954–1977	24
T19	(United States) Lee Trevino **H**	1939–	29	6	1968–1984	17
T21	(United States) Leo Diegel **H**	1899–1951	28	2	1920–1934	15
T21	(United States) Paul Runyan **H**	1908–2002	28	2	1930–1941	12
23	(United States) Henry Picard **H**	1906–1997	26	2	1932–1945	14
T24	(Scotland) (United States) Tommy Armour **H**	1894–1968	25	3	1920–1938	19
T24	(United States) Johnny Miller **H**	1947–	25	2	1971–1994	24
T24	(Scotland) Macdonald Smith	1890–1949	25	0	1912–1936	25
T27	(United States) **Dustin Johnson**	1984–	24	2	2008–2020	13
T27	(South Africa) Gary Player **H**	1935–	24	9	1958–1978	21
T29	(England) (Note: Jim Barnes was born in England, but became a U.S. citizen soon after moving to the United States in 1906.) Jim Barnes **H**	1886–1966	22	4	1914–1937	24
T29	(United States) Johnny Farrell **H**	1901–1988	22	1	1921–1936	16
T29	(United States) Raymond Floyd **H**	1942–	22	4	1963–1992	30
T29	(United States) **Scottie Scheffler**	1996–	22	4	2022–2026	5
T33	(United States) Davis Love III **H**	1964–	21	1	1987–2015	29
T33	(United States) Lanny Wadkins **H**	1949–	21	1	1972–1992	21
T33	(United States) Craig Wood **H**	1901–1968	21	2	1928–1944	17
T36	(United States) Hale Irwin **H**	1945–	20	3	1971–1994	24
T36	(Australia) Greg Norman **H**	1955–	20	2	1984–1997	14
T36	(United States) Johnny Revolta	1911–1991	20	1	1933–1944	12
T36	(United States) Doug Sanders	1933–2020	20	0	1956–1972	17
T36	(Scotland) Willie Macfarlane	1890–1961	20	1	1916–1936	21
T41	(United States) Ben Crenshaw **H**	1952–	19	2	1973–1995	23
T41	(South Africa) Ernie Els **H**	1969–	19	4	1994–2012	19
T41	(United States) Doug Ford **H**	1922–2018	19	2	1952–1963	12
T41	(United States) Hubert Green **H**	1946–2018	19	2	1971–1985	15
T41	(United States) Tom Kite **H**	1949–	19	1	1976–1993	18
T41	(United States) Bill Mehlhorn	1898–1989	19	0	1923–1930	8
T47	(United States) Julius Boros **H**	1920–1994	18	3	1952–1968	17
T47	(Australia) Jim Ferrier	1915–1986	18	1	1944–1961	18
T47	(United States) Dutch Harrison	1910–1982	18	0	1939–1958	20
T47	(Zimbabwe) Nick Price **H**	1957–	18	3	1983–2002	20

== See also ==
- List of longest PGA Tour win streaks
- Most PGA Tour wins in a year
- List of golfers with most European Tour wins
- List of men's major championships winning golfers
