= Wiffy Cox =

American professional golfer (1896–1969)

Personal information
- Full name: Wilfred Hiram Cox
- Nickname: Wiffy
- Nationality: United States
- Born: October 27, 1896 Brooklyn, New York, U.S.
- Died: February 20, 1969 (aged 72) Washington, D.C., U.S.

Career
- Sport: Golf
- Status: Professional
- Former tour: PGA Tour
- Professional wins: 12

Number of wins by tour
- PGA Tour: 9
- Other: 3

Best results in major championships
- Masters Tournament: 12th: 1937
- PGA Championship: T17: 1928, 1929, 1930
- U.S. Open: T3: 1934
- The Open Championship: DNP

Wilfred Hiram "Wiffy" Cox (October 27, 1896 – February 20, 1969) was an American professional golfer who played on the PGA Tour in the 1930s.

== Early life ==
Cox was born and grew up in a tough Irish-Italian section of Brooklyn, New York. He started in golf as a caddie at Westchester County courses and learned to play at sunrise and sunset with clubs borrowed from the pro shop. The diminutive Cox had a hot-temper and a reputation for foul-mouthed, trash talk among his fellow players.

== Professional career ==
Cox won nine times on the PGA Tour. His first individual win on the PGA Tour came at the 1931 North and South Open; his four wins that year led the PGA Tour for most wins. His best finish in a major championship was tied for third at the 1934 U.S. Open.

Cox played on the winning U.S. team in the 1931 Ryder Cup, winning both his matches.

Like most professional golfers of his generation, Cox earned his living primarily as a club pro. He was the course pro at Dyker Beach Golf Course in Brooklyn, New York from 1921 to 1935. He eventually landed a plum job as head pro at the Congressional Country Club in Bethesda, Maryland, which he held until 1969.

== Personal life ==
He died in Washington, D.C.

== Professional wins (12) ==
=== PGA Tour wins (9) ===
- 1930 Mid-South Open Bestball (with Willie Macfarlane)
- 1931 Miami International Four-Ball (with Willie Macfarlane), North and South Open, Massachusetts Open, San Francisco National Match Play Open
- 1934 Agua Caliente Open, Texas Open
- 1936 Sacramento Open
- 1937 District Open

=== Other wins (3) ===
- 1931 Florida Open (tie with Joe Turnesa)
- 1942 Maryland Open
- 1943 Long Island PGA Championship

== Results in major championships ==
| Tournament | 1923 | 1924 | 1925 | 1926 | 1927 | 1928 | 1929 | 1930 | 1931 | 1932 | 1933 | 1934 | 1935 | 1936 | 1937 | 1938 | 1939 |
|---|---|---|---|---|---|---|---|---|---|---|---|---|---|---|---|---|---|
| Masters Tournament | NYF | NYF | NYF | NYF | NYF | NYF | NYF | NYF | NYF | NYF | NYF | WD | T43 | T13 | 12 | T25 | |
| U.S. Open | | T29 | | | | | T11 | T35 | T4 | 5 | CUT | T3 | CUT | T5 | T45 | | CUT |
| PGA Championship | R64 | | | | | R32 | R32 | R32 | | | | | | | | R64 | |

Note: Cox never played in The Open Championship.

Top 10
Did not play

NYF = tournament not yet founded
WD = withdrew
CUT = missed the half-way cut
R64, R32, R16, QF, SF = round in which player lost in PGA Championship match play
"T" indicates a tie for a place

== See also ==
- List of golfers with most PGA Tour wins
