= Horton Smith =

American professional golfer (1908–1963)

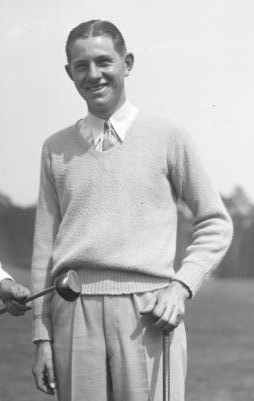
- Smith in 1929

Personal information
- Nickname: The Joplin Ghost
- Nationality: United States
- Born: May 22, 1908 Springfield, Missouri, U.S.
- Died: October 15, 1963 (aged 55) Detroit, Michigan, U.S.

Career
- Sport: Golf
- College: Southwest Missouri State - Now Missouri State University
- Turned professional: 1926
- Former tour: PGA Tour
- Professional wins: 34

Number of wins by tour
- PGA Tour: 30
- Other: 4

Best results in major championships (wins: 2)
- Masters Tournament: Won: 1934, 1936
- PGA Championship: T3: 1928
- U.S. Open: 3rd: 1930, 1940
- The Open Championship: T4: 1930

Achievements and awards
- World Golf Hall of Fame: 1990 (member page)
- PGA Tour leading money winner: 1936
- Bob Jones Award: 1962

Horton Smith (May 22, 1908 – October 15, 1963) was an American professional golfer, best known as the winner of the first and third Masters Tournaments.

== Career ==
Born in Springfield, Missouri, Smith turned professional in 1926 and won his first tournament, the Oklahoma City Open in 1928. In 1929 he won eight titles. This was an era of expansion and reorganization for professional golf. The PGA Tour was founded in 1934, and Smith was one of the leading players of the early years of the tour, topping the money list in 1936. He accumulated 30 PGA Tour titles in total, the last of them in 1941, and his two major championships came at the Masters, at the inaugural tournament in 1934 and again in 1936 (the latter was the first Masters to end on a Monday due to rain).

Smith was a member of five Ryder Cup teams: 1929, 1931, 1933, 1935, and 1937. His career Ryder Cup record was 3–0–1, his only blemish a halved singles match against Bill Cox in 1935 at Ridgewood Country Club in New Jersey. Smith was the only golfer to defeat Bobby Jones during the latter's Grand Slam year of 1930, at the stroke play Savannah Open in February. He played in every Masters through 1963, the year of his death.

Smith served in the U.S. Army Air Forces during World War II in the special services division coordinating athletics and was discharged as a captain.

After the war, he became the club pro at Detroit Golf Club in Michigan in 1946, where he remained until his death. He was president of the PGA of America from 1952 to 1954. During that time black professionals continued to be excluded from PGA events despite Smith stating that he would support reviewing this rule when, in January 1952, Bill Spiller was excluded from the San Diego Open while former boxer Joe Louis was allowed to play as an invited amateur. The "Caucasian only" clause in the PGA of America's constitution was not amended until November 1961.

When he resigned as head professional of Oak Park Country Club in 1936, his elder brother Renshaw (1906–1971) replaced him at the club in River Grove, Illinois.

Smith took time to travel the country and host skill showcases at regional golf courses such as Nemadji Golf Course with fellow professionals Lawson Little, Harry Cooper, and Jimmy Thomson.

== Death ==
In 1963, Smith died at the age of 55 from Hodgkin's disease in Detroit. He had lost a lung to cancer six years earlier, and is buried in his hometown of Springfield, Missouri. He was the first of the former Masters champions to die, followed by Craig Wood in 1968 and Jimmy Demaret in 1983.

== Awards and honors ==
- Smith was inducted into the Michigan Golf Hall of Fame in 1984.
- Smith was inducted into the World Golf Hall of Fame in 1990.
- In 1960, awarded the Ben Hogan Award by the golf writers for overcoming a physical handicap and continued active participation in golf.
- In 1962, he was voted the Bob Jones Award, the highest honor given by the United States Golf Association in recognition of distinguished sportsmanship in golf.
- The PGA of America bestowed the Horton Smith Award, presented annually since 1965, to a PGA professional who has made "outstanding and continuing contributions to PGA education." On July 2, 2020, it was renamed the PGA Professional Development Award by the board of directors because Smith had been a supporter of the PGA's "Caucasian-only' membership clause that was part of their by-laws from 1934 to 1961.
- A municipal golf course in his hometown of Springfield, Missouri, is named for him.
- A golf tournament at the Detroit Golf Club is named for him.
- He is attributed with being the first professional golfer to study putting as a means to beat his opponents.
- In September 2013, Horton's green jacket, awarded in 1949 for his Masters wins in 1934 and 1936, sold at auction for over $682,000; the highest price ever paid for a piece of golf memorabilia. It had been in the possession of his brother Ren's stepsons for decades.

== Professional wins ==
=== PGA Tour wins (30) ===
- 1928 (2) Oklahoma City Open, Catalina Island Open
- 1929 (8) Berkeley Open Championship, Pensacola Open Invitational, Florida Open, La Gorce Open, Fort Myers Open, North and South Open, Oregon Open, Pasadena Open (December)
- 1930 (4) Central Florida Open, Savannah Open, Berkeley Open, Bay District Open
- 1931 (1) St. Paul Open
- 1932 (1) National Capital City Open
- 1933 (1) Miami International Four-Ball (with Paul Runyan)
- 1934 (3) **Masters Tournament**, Grand Slam Open, California Open
- 1935 (3) Palm Springs Invitational, Miami Biltmore Open, Pasadena Open
- 1936 (2) **Masters Tournament**, Victoria Open
- 1937 (3) North and South Open, Inverness Invitational Four-Ball (with Harry Cooper), Oklahoma Four-Ball (with Harry Cooper)
- 1941 (2) Florida West Coast Open, St. Paul Open

Major championships are shown in bold.

=== Other wins ===
this list is probably incomplete

- 1929 French PGA Championship
- 1940 Massachusetts Open
- 1948 Michigan PGA Championship
- 1954 Michigan Open

== Major championships ==
=== Wins (2) ===
Year	Championship	54 holes	Winning score	Margin	Runner-up
1934	Masters Tournament	1 shot lead	−4 (70-72-70-72=284)	1 stroke	(United States) Craig Wood
1936	Masters Tournament (2)	3 shot deficit	−3 (74-71-68-72=285)	1 stroke	(United States) Harry Cooper

=== Results timeline ===
Tournament	1927	1928	1929
U.S. Open	T44	T28	10
The Open Championship			T25
PGA Championship		SF	R32

Tournament	1930	1931	1932	1933	1934	1935	1936	1937	1938	1939
Masters Tournament	NYF	NYF	NYF	NYF	1	T19	1	T19	T22	T26
U.S. Open	3	T27	T55	T24	T17	T6	T22	T36	T19	15
The Open Championship	T4	T12		T14				10		
PGA Championship	QF	QF	R32	R32		QF	QF	R16	QF	QF

Tournament	1940	1941	1942	1943	1944	1945	1946	1947	1948	1949
Masters Tournament	T47	T19	5	NT	NT	NT	T21	T22	34	T23
U.S. Open	3	T13	NT	NT	NT	NT	CUT	WD	CUT	T23
The Open Championship	NT	NT	NT	NT	NT	NT				
PGA Championship	R64	R16		NT					R64	R32

Tournament	1950	1951	1952	1953	1954	1955	1956	1957	1958	1959
Masters Tournament	T12	T32	T30	T45	T38	T59	76	CUT	CUT	CUT
U.S. Open	CUT	CUT	T15	CUT						
The Open Championship										
PGA Championship			R64		R16					

Tournament	1960	1961	1962	1963
Masters Tournament	CUT	CUT	CUT	CUT
U.S. Open				
The Open Championship				
PGA Championship				

Win
Top 10
Did not play

NYF = tournament not yet founded
NT = no tournament
WD = withdrew
CUT = missed the half-way cut
R64, R32, R16, QF, SF = Round in which player lost in PGA Championship match play
"T" indicates a tie for a place

=== Summary ===
Tournament	Wins	2nd	3rd	Top-5	Top-10	Top-25	Events	Cuts made
Masters Tournament	2	0	0	3	3	11	27	20
U.S. Open	0	0	2	2	4	12	23	17
The Open Championship	0	0	0	1	2	5	5	5
PGA Championship	0	0	1	7	10	14	17	17
Totals	2	0	3	13	19	42	72	59

- Most consecutive cuts made – 43 (1927 U.S. Open – 1946 Masters)
- Longest streak of top-10s – 3 (twice)

== See also ==
- List of golfers with most PGA Tour wins
- Most PGA Tour wins in a year
