= Johnny Farrell =

American professional golfer (1901–1988)

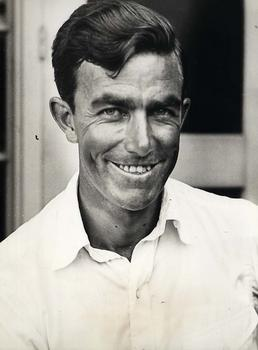

Personal information
- Full name: John Joseph Farrell
- Nicknames: The Gentleman, Handsome Johnny
- Nationality: United States
- Born: April 1, 1901 White Plains, New York, U.S.
- Died: June 14, 1988 (aged 87) Boynton Beach, Florida, U.S.
- Height: 5 ft 10.5 in (1.79 m)
- Weight: 160 lb (73 kg; 11 st)
- Spouse: Catherine Theresa Hush Farrell
- Children: 5

Career
- Sport: Golf
- Turned professional: 1922
- Former tour: PGA Tour
- Professional wins: 27

Number of wins by tour
- PGA Tour: 20
- Other: 7

Best results in major championships (wins: 1)
- Masters Tournament: T29: 1936
- PGA Championship: 2nd: 1929
- U.S. Open: Won: 1928
- The Open Championship: 2nd: 1929

Achievements and awards
- World Golf Hall of Fame: 2023 (member page)
- PGA Hall of Fame: 1966

John Joseph Farrell (April 1, 1901 – June 14, 1988) was an American professional golfer, best known for winning the U.S. Open in 1928. Over the course of his career, he won 22 PGA Tour events.

== Career ==
Born in White Plains, New York, Farrell started as a caddie and turned professional in 1922.

At the 1928 U.S. Open, held at Olympia Fields Country Club near Chicago, Farrell tied with amateur Bobby Jones, then a two-time champion, after the regulation 72 holes and won the 36-hole playoff by one stroke. Farrell was voted the 1927 and 1928 Best Golf Professional in the United States, after a winning streak of six consecutive tournaments, on his road to a total of 22 career PGA Tour wins. He played for the United States in the first three Ryder Cups: 1927, 1929, and 1931.

Farrell was the head professional at the Quaker Ridge Golf Club in New York from 1919 to 1930. In 1931, Farrell played in his third Ryder Cup and also met and married Catherine Hush. In 1934, Farrell accepted the head professional job at Baltusrol Golf Club in Springfield, New Jersey.

In 1948, the AP's Frank Eck reported that there had been, to that point, eight rounds as low as 62 posted in competitive golf, and that Farrell had been the first to do so, in the late 1920s, at the La Gorce Country Club course in Miami Beach.

== Personal life ==
Farrell was married to Catherine. They had five children: Johnny, Jimmy, Billy, Peggy, and Cathy. The Farrell family dedicated itself to golf, becoming Golf Family of the Year in 1966. Billy Farrell played professional golf and is best known for being the first ever to hit the 630-yard (576 m) par-5 17th hole at Baltusrol's Lower Course in two shots, which he did during the 1967 U.S. Open.

Farrell died in Boynton Beach, Florida after a stroke at age 87.

== Awards and honors ==
Farrell was elected to the World Golf Hall of Fame in 2023 and was inducted in 2024.

== Professional wins (27) ==
=== PGA Tour wins (20) ===
- 1921 (1) Garden City Open
- 1922 (1) Shawnee Open
- 1924 (1) Florida West Coast Open
- 1925 (2) Philadelphia Open Championship
- 1926 (4) Florida Central Competition, Florida Open, Shawnee Open
- 1927 (7) Metropolitan Open, Shawnee Open, Eastern Open Championship, Massachusetts Open, Pennsylvania Open Championship, Philadelphia Open Championship, Chicago Open Championship
- 1928 (2) La Gorce Open, **U.S. Open**
- 1930 (2) Pensacola Open Invitational, New York State Open
- 1931 (1) Pensacola Open Invitational
- 1936 (1) New Jersey Open

Major championship is shown in bold.

=== Other wins (7) ===
Note: This list may be incomplete.

- 1925 Miami International Four-Ball (with Bobby Cruickshank), Mid-South All Pro
- 1926 Westchester Open, Mid-Winter Tournament
- 1928 Miami International Four-Ball (with Gene Sarazen)
- 1940 Rhode Island Open
- 1941 Rhode Island Open

== Major championships ==
=== Wins (1) ===
| Year | Championship | 54 holes | Winning score | Margin | Runner-up |
|---|---|---|---|---|---|
| 1928 | U.S. Open | 5 shot deficit | +10 (77-74-71-72=294) | Playoff ^{1} | (United States) Bobby Jones |

^{1} Defeated Bobby Jones in a 36-hole playoff – Farrell 70-73=143 (+1), Jones 73-71=144 (+2).

=== Results timeline ===
| Tournament | 1919 | 1920 | 1921 | 1922 | 1923 | 1924 | 1925 | 1926 | 1927 | 1928 | 1929 |
|---|---|---|---|---|---|---|---|---|---|---|---|
| U.S. Open | | T45 | 38 | T11 | T5 | T19 | T3 | T3 | T7 | **1** | CUT |
| The Open Championship | NT | | | | T19 | | | | | | 2 |
| PGA Championship | R32 | | R32 | R16 | R16 | QF | QF | SF | R32 | | 2 |

| Tournament | 1930 | 1931 | 1932 | 1933 | 1934 | 1935 | 1936 | 1937 | 1938 | 1939 |
|---|---|---|---|---|---|---|---|---|---|---|
| Masters Tournament | NYF | NYF | NYF | NYF | T36 | T37 | T29 | | | 39 |
| U.S. Open | 8 | T10 | CUT | T9 | T58 | T52 | T22 | T40 | | CUT |
| The Open Championship | | T5 | | T54 | | | | | | |
| PGA Championship | QF | R32 | | SF | | | | R16 | R64 | R32 |

| Tournament | 1940 | 1941 | 1942 | 1943 | 1944 | 1945 | 1946 | 1947 | 1948 | 1949 |
|---|---|---|---|---|---|---|---|---|---|---|
| Masters Tournament | T14 | | | NT | NT | NT | | T53 | 48 | 53 |
| U.S. Open | 28 | CUT | NT | NT | NT | NT | CUT | | | |
| The Open Championship | NT | NT | NT | NT | NT | NT | | | | |
| PGA Championship | | | | NT | | | | | | |

| Tournament | 1950 | 1951 | 1952 | 1953 | 1954 | 1955 | 1956 |
|---|---|---|---|---|---|---|---|
| Masters Tournament | WD | T57 | | | | WD | WD |
| U.S. Open | CUT | | | | CUT | | |
| The Open Championship | | | | | | | |
| PGA Championship | | | | | | | |

Win
Top 10
Did not play

NYF = tournament not yet founded
NT = no tournament
WD = withdrew
CUT = missed the half-way cut
R64, R32, R16, QF, SF = round in which player lost in PGA Championship match play
"T" indicates a tie for a place

=== Summary ===
| Tournament | Wins | 2nd | 3rd | Top-5 | Top-10 | Top-25 | Events | Cuts made |
|---|---|---|---|---|---|---|---|---|
| Masters Tournament | 0 | 0 | 0 | 0 | 0 | 1 | 12 | 9 |
| U.S. Open | 1 | 0 | 2 | 4 | 8 | 11 | 24 | 17 |
| The Open Championship | 0 | 1 | 0 | 2 | 2 | 3 | 4 | 4 |
| PGA Championship | 0 | 1 | 2 | 6 | 9 | 14 | 15 | 15 |
| Totals | 1 | 2 | 4 | 12 | 19 | 29 | 55 | 45 |

- Most consecutive cuts made – 18 (1919 PGA – 1928 U.S. Open)
- Longest streak of top-10s – 6 (twice)

== See also ==
- List of golfers with most PGA Tour wins
