= Joe Kirkwood Sr. =

Australian golfer (1897-1970)

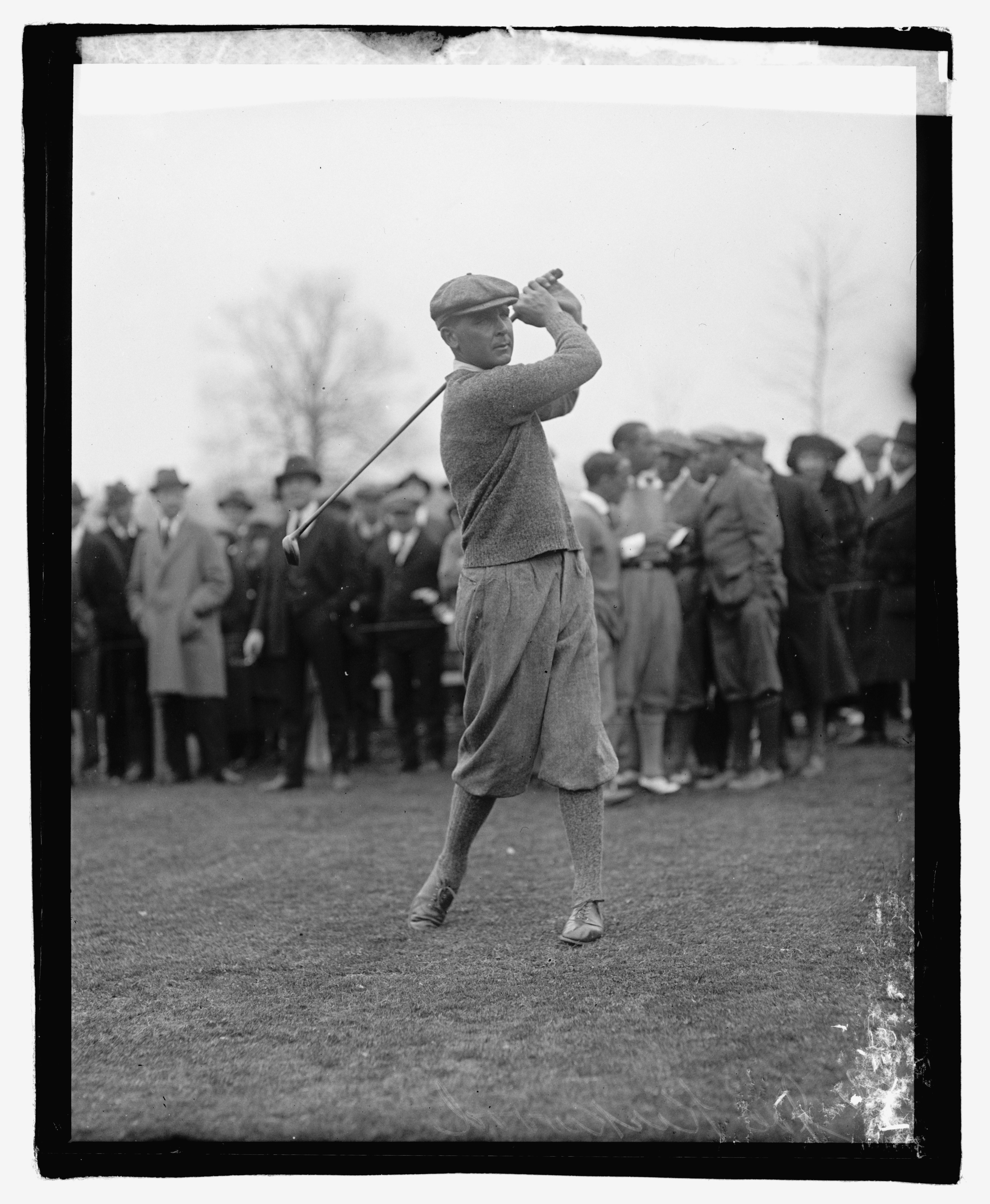

Personal information
- Full name: Joseph Henry Kirkwood Sr.
- Nationality: Australia
- Born: 3 April 1897 Sydney, Australia
- Died: 29 October 1970 (aged 73) Burlington, Vermont, U.S.

Career
- Sport: Golf
- Turned professional: 1920
- Former tour: PGA Tour
- Professional wins: 17

Number of wins by tour
- PGA Tour: 13
- Other: 4

Best results in major championships
- Masters Tournament: T29: 1936
- PGA Championship: T3: 1930
- U.S. Open: T9: 1933
- The Open Championship: 4th/T4: 1923, 1927, 1934

Joseph Henry Kirkwood Sr. (3 April 1897 – 29 October 1970) was a professional golfer who is acknowledged as having put Australian golf on the world map.

== Career ==
Born in Sydney, Australia, Kirkwood left home at age ten to work on a sheep station in the Australian Outback, where his boss introduced him to the game of golf. He developed his skills to the point where he could compete in his country's most important golf tournaments. Kirkwood won the 1920 Australian Open with a score of 290, 12 strokes better than the previous tournament record score. Later in 1920 he won the New Zealand Open.

Kirkwood's success led him to England and Europe where, in his first competition, he defeated the great Harry Vardon. He began playing on the professional tour in the United States in 1923, winning that year's Houston Invitational, and was the first Australian to win on what became the PGA Tour. In 1924, he was one of the top-ranked golfers on the tour with five victories, three of which were consecutive. Kirkwood remains co-holder of the record for the widest winning stroke margin in PGA Tour history, set at the 1924 Corpus Christi Open in Texas. That year he also teamed up with Walter Hagen to begin traveling around the globe putting on golf and trick-shot exhibitions, newsreels of which were sent back home to be shown in cinemas around the U.S.

Kirkwood's best performance in a major championship was a third-place finish in the PGA Championship in 1930, a semifinalist in the match play competition. He finished fourth in the British Open on three separate occasions. In 1933, he won the Canadian Open. He was apparently the first-ever golfer to tee off from the howdah atop a domesticated elephant, which he first did (and was photographed doing) at Royal Calcutta Golf Club in Calcutta in 1937, and soon after in other clubs in India, and later in Africa.

In 1938, with exhibition monies tight in the post-Depression years, Kirkwood became head professional at the Huntingdon Valley Country Club in Philadelphia. Kirkwood replaced George Low, Sr. at the club, which had a long history of attracting top-notch professionals. Kirkwood spent eleven years at Huntingdon Valley, combining traditional club responsibilities with competitive tournament play and golf exhibitions after World War II. But by 1949, the club wanted a head professional who would spend more time at the club, so they parted ways with Kirkwood.

Over his lifetime in golf, Kirkwood is credited with scoring twenty-nine holes-in-one, two of which came in the same round. In his later years, he retired to the mountain resort community of Stowe, Vermont in New England, where he was the local teaching pro at the Stowe Country Club. The club has held the Joe Kirkwood Memorial Golf Tournament annually since 1967. Notably, Kirkwood's skills remained at a high level for most of his life and at age fifty-one, in 1948 he and his son Joe Kirkwood Jr. both made the cut at the U.S. Open, the first father and son to do so and a record tied only in 2004. When his son won the 1951 Blue Ribbon Open they became the third father-son winners in the history of the PGA Tour, which by 2010 still has only seven such pairs of winners.

One of Joe Kirkwood Sr.'s most remarkable feats was playing a round of golf at 10-under-par 62, "breaking his age" when 63 years old.

== Personal life ==
His son, Joe Kirkwood Jr., became an actor who made a series of Hollywood films portraying the fictional boxer Joe Palooka.

== Death and legacy ==
Kirkwood died at age 73 in 1970 in Burlington, Vermont.

His burial site bears the following inscription, which Kirkwood also had framed on the wall of his pro shop at the Huntingdon Valley Country Club;

Tell your story of hard luck shots,

Of each shot straight and true,

But when you are done, remember son -

That nobody cares but you!

Kirkwood estimated that he played more than 7,000 courses during his career and logged incalculable miles at a time when travel was not easy. Given his worldwide travel and related exhibitions, he likely introduced golf to more people face-to-face than anyone in the history of the game.

He was elected to the American Golf Hall of Fame at Foxburg, Pennsylvania. His autobiography, as told to Barbara Fey, was published posthumously in 1973 under the title Links of Life. In his honour, the annual winner of the Australian PGA Championship receives the Kirkwood Cup.

He is buried in the West Branch Cemetery in Stowe, Vermont.

== Professional wins ==
=== PGA Tour wins (13) ===
- 1923 (5) California Open Championship, St. Augustine Open, Houston Invitational, Open Championship of Illinois, Kansas Mid-Continent Pro Championship (tie with Walter Hagen)
- 1924 (4) Texas Open, Houston Open, Philadelphia Open Championship, Corpus Christi Open
- 1930 (1) Long Beach Open (tie with Olin Dutra)
- 1931 (1) Southeastern Open
- 1933 (2) North and South Open, Canadian Open

=== Other wins ===
- 1920 Australian Open, New Zealand Open, New Zealand Professional Championship
- 1922 McVitie & Price Tournament

== Results in major championships ==
Tournament	1921	1922	1923	1924	1925	1926	1927	1928	1929
U.S. Open	T33	T13	T12	T22	T45		CUT	T41	T19
The Open Championship	T6	T20	4		T14	T24	T4		
PGA Championship			QF						R32

Tournament	1930	1931	1932	1933	1934	1935	1936	1937	1938	1939
Masters Tournament	NYF	NYF	NYF	NYF			T29			
U.S. Open	CUT		T23	T9	T12					
The Open Championship		T26		T14	T4	WD		CUT		
PGA Championship	SF	R32	R32							

Tournament	1940	1941	1942	1943	1944	1945	1946	1947	1948
Masters Tournament				NT	NT	NT			WD
U.S. Open			NT	NT	NT	NT	T57	T23	T28
The Open Championship	NT	NT	NT	NT	NT	NT	T8		
PGA Championship			R16	NT					

Top 10
Did not play

NYF = tournament not yet founded
NT = no tournament
WD = withdrew
CUT = missed the half-way cut
R32, R16, QF, SF = round in which player lost in PGA Championship match play
"T" indicates a tie for a place

=== Summary ===
Tournament	Wins	2nd	3rd	Top-5	Top-10	Top-25	Events	Cuts made
Masters Tournament	0	0	0	0	0	0	2	1
U.S. Open	0	0	0	0	1	8	15	13
The Open Championship	0	0	0	3	5	9	12	10
PGA Championship	0	0	1	2	3	6	6	6
Totals	0	0	1	5	9	23	35	30

- Most consecutive cuts made – 11 (1921 Open Championship – 1926 Open Championship)
- Longest streak of top-10s – 1 (nine times)
