= Tommy Armour =

Scottish-American professional golfer (1896–1968)

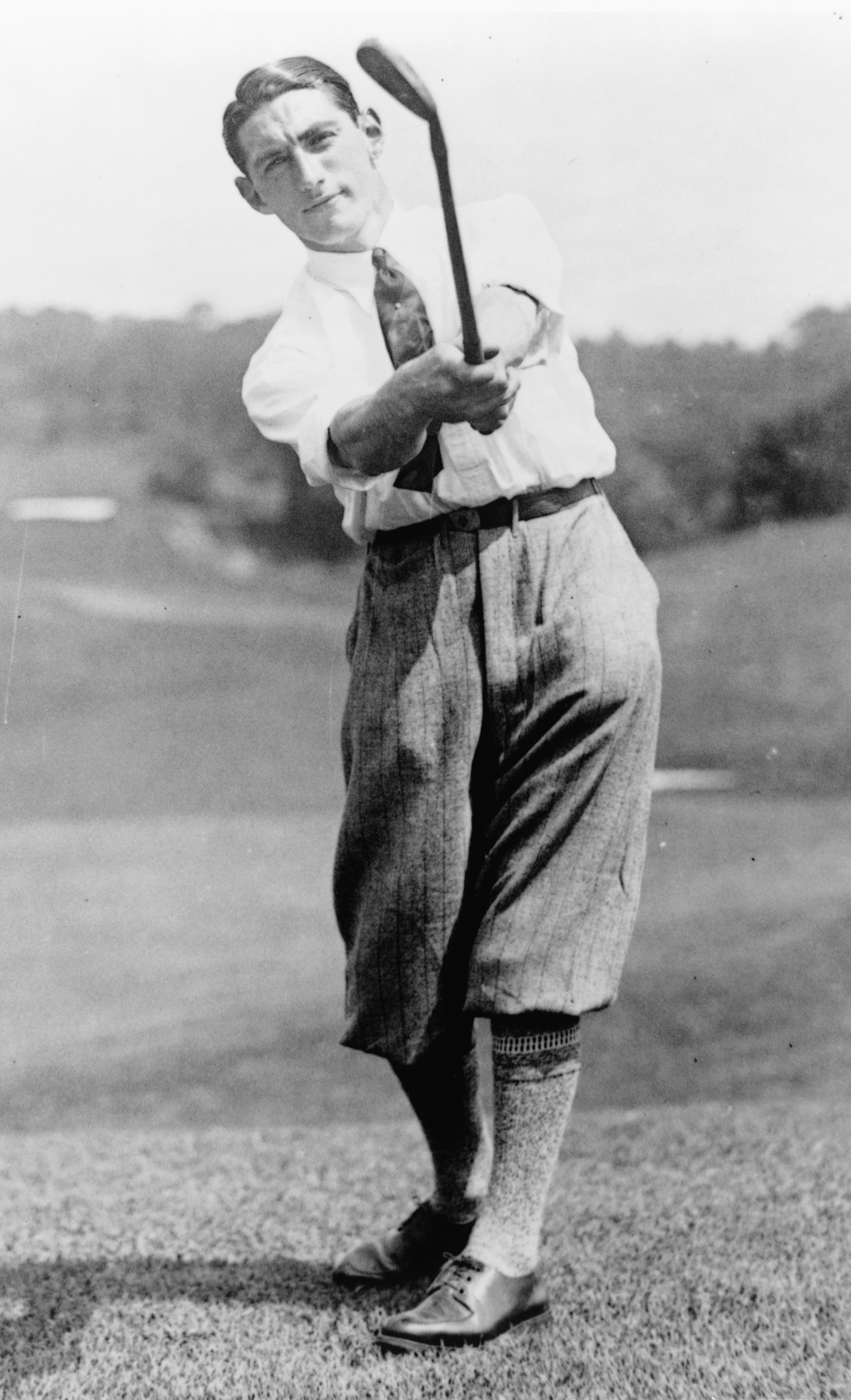
- Armour in 1927

Personal information
- Full name: Thomas Dickson Armour
- Nickname: The Silver Scot
- Nationality: Scotland; United States
- Born: 24 September 1896 Boroughmuir, Edinburgh, Scotland
- Died: 11 September 1968 (aged 71) Larchmont, New York, US

Career
- Sport: Golf
- College: University of Edinburgh
- Turned professional: 1924
- Former tour: PGA Tour
- Professional wins: 27

Number of wins by tour
- PGA Tour: 25
- Other: 2

Best results in major championships (wins: 3)
- Masters Tournament: T8: 1937
- PGA Championship: Won: 1930
- U.S. Open: Won: 1927
- The Open Championship: Won: 1931
- U.S. Amateur: T5: 1920
- British Amateur: T33: 1920, 1921

Achievements and awards
- World Golf Hall of Fame: 1976 (member page)

Thomas Dickson Armour (24 September 1896 – 11 September 1968) was a Scottish-born golfer who played primarily in the United States. He was nicknamed The Silver Scot. He was the winner of three of golf's major championships: 1927 U.S. Open, 1930 PGA, and 1931 Open Championship. Armour popularized the term yips, the colloquial term for a sudden and unexplained loss of skills in experienced athletes.

== Early life ==
Armour was born on 24 September 1896 in Boroughmuir, Edinburgh, Scotland, the son of Martha Dickson and her husband George Armour, a baker. He went to school at Boroughmuir High School, Edinburgh, (formerly Boroughmuir Senior Secondary School) and studied at the University of Edinburgh. During his early golf career, he played at Lothianburn Golf Club near the Pentland Hills. At the outbreak of World War I enlisted with the Black Watch and was a machine-gunner. He rose from private to Staff Major in the Tank Corps. His conduct earned him an audience with George V. However, he lost his sight to a mustard gas explosion and surgeons had to add a metal plate to his head and left arm. During his convalescence, he regained the sight of his right eye, and began playing much more golf.

== Amateur career ==
Armour won the 1920 French Amateur tournament. He moved to the United States and met Walter Hagen who gave him a job as secretary of the Westchester-Biltmore Club.

In 1920, he won a PGA Tour event, the Pinehurst Fall Pro-Am Bestball, while still an amateur, pairing with professional Leo Diegel.

== Professional career ==
In 1924, Armour turned professional. During his tournament playing career, he won three major championships: the 1927 U.S. Open, 1930 PGA Championship, and the 1931 Open Championship. With Jim Barnes and Rory McIlroy, he is one of three natives of the United Kingdom to win three different professional majors. His victory in the British Open in 1931 completed a pre-Masters era professional Grand Slam. He was one of just two players, along with Walter Hagen who also completed the feat in 1931, to win all three traditional majors and the three other tournaments often regarded at the time as being major championships for the professionals: the Western Open, Canadian Open and Metropolitan Open.

Armour retired from full-time professional tournament golf after the 1935 season, although he competed periodically in top-class events for several years afterwards. He taught at the Boca Raton Club in Florida from 1926 to 1955, for $50 a lesson. His pupils included Babe Didrikson Zaharias and Lawson Little. He was also a member at the Winged Foot Golf Club in suburban New York City, where he spent much of his summers.

Armour co-wrote a book How to Play Your Best Golf All the Time (1953) with Herb Graffis. It became a best-seller and for many years was the biggest-selling book ever authored on golf. A series of 8mm films based on the book was released by Castle Films including Short Game Parts I and II, Long Hitting Clubs, Grip, and Stance.

== Personal life ==
Armour became an American citizen in November 1942.

In 1968, Armour died in Larchmont, New York. He was cremated at the Ferncliff Cemetery in Hartsdale, New York but not interred there. Some modern golf equipment is still marketed in his name.

Armour is succeeded by his grandson, Tommy Armour III, who is a two-time winner on the PGA Tour.

== Awards and honors ==
In 1976, Armour was inducted into the World Golf Hall of Fame.

== Amateur wins ==
- 1920 French Open Amateur Championship

== Professional wins ==
=== PGA Tour wins (25) ===
- 1920 (1) Pinehurst Fall Pro-Am Bestball (as an amateur, with Leo Diegel)
- 1925 (1) Florida West Coast Open
- 1926 (1) Winter Pro Golf Championship
- 1927 (5) Long Beach Open, El Paso Open, **U.S. Open**, Canadian Open, Oregon Open
- 1928 (4) Metropolitan Open, Philadelphia Open Championship, Pennsylvania Open Championship, Sacramento Open
- 1929 (1) Western Open
- 1930 (3) Canadian Open, **PGA Championship**, St. Louis Open
- 1931 (1) **The Open Championship**
- 1932 (3) Miami Open, Miami International Four-Ball (with Ed Dudley), Mid-South Bestball (with Al Watrous)
- 1934 (2) Canadian Open, Pinehurst Fall Pro-Pro (with Bobby Cruickshank)
- 1935 (1) Miami Open
- 1936 (1) Walter Olson Golf Tournament (tie with Willie Macfarlane)
- 1938 (1) Mid-South Open

Major championships are shown in bold.

=== Other wins ===
- 1927 Miami International Four-Ball (with Bobby Cruickshank)
- 1938 Mid South Pro/Pro (with Bobby Cruickshank; tie with Henry Picard and Jack Grout)

== Major championships ==
=== Wins (3) ===
Year	Championship	54 holes	Winning score	Margin	Runner-up
1927	U.S. Open	1 shot deficit	+13 (78-71-76-76=301)	Playoff ^{1}	(United States) Harry Cooper
1930	PGA Championship	n/a	1 up		(United States) Gene Sarazen
1931	The Open Championship	5 shot deficit	+8 (73-75-77-71=296)	1 stroke	(Argentina) José Jurado

^{1} Defeated Harry Cooper in an 18-hole playoff: Armour 76 (+4), Cooper 79 (+7).
Note: The PGA Championship was match play until 1958

=== Results timeline ===
Tournament	1920	1921	1922	1923	1924	1925	1926	1927	1928	1929
U.S. Open	T48			WD	T13	T38	T9	1	16	T5
The Open Championship	T53						13		CUT	10
PGA Championship						QF		QF	R32	
U.S. Amateur	QF	R16	R32		–	–	–	–	–	–
The Amateur Championship	R64	R64			–	–	–	–	–	–

Tournament	1930	1931	1932	1933	1934	1935	1936	1937	1938	1939
Masters Tournament	NYF	NYF	NYF	NYF		T37	T20	T8		T12
U.S. Open	6	T46	T21	T4	T50	WD	T22	CUT	23	T22
The Open Championship		1	T17							
PGA Championship	1	QF			R16	2	R64	R64		

Tournament	1940	1941	1942	1943	1944	1945	1946	1947	1948	1949	1950
Masters Tournament	38	38	T28	NT	NT	NT					
U.S. Open	T12	CUT	NT	NT	NT	NT	CUT	CUT	WD		CUT
The Open Championship	NT	NT	NT	NT	NT	NT					
PGA Championship				NT							

Win
Top 10
Did not play

NYF = tournament not yet founded
NT = no tournament
WD = withdrew
CUT = missed the half-way cut
R64, R32, R16, QF, SF = round in which player lost in match play
"T" indicates a tie for a place

Sources: U.S. Open and U.S. Amateur, Amateur Championship:1920, 1921

== Team appearances ==
Amateur

- Great Britain vs USA (representing Great Britain): 1921

Professional

- Great Britain vs USA (representing the United States): 1926

== See also ==
- List of golfers with most PGA Tour wins
