= 1933 U.S. Open (golf) =

Coordinates: 42.072°N 87.791°W

Tournament information
- Dates: June 8–10, 1933
- Location: Glenview, Illinois
- Course: North Shore Country Club
- Organized by: USGA
- Tour: PGA Tour
- Format: Stroke play − 72 holes

Statistics
- Par: 72
- Length: 6,927 yards (6,334 m)
- Field: 148 players, 67 after cut
- Cut: 156 (+12)
- Prize fund: $5,000
- Winner's share: ($1,000)

Champion
- (United States) Johnny Goodman (a)
- 287 (−1)

Location in the United States
Location in Illinois

The 1933 U.S. Open was the 37th U.S. Open, held June 8–10 at North Shore Country Club in Glenview, Illinois, a suburb northwest of Chicago. Amateur Johnny Goodman outlasted Ralph Guldahl by a single stroke to win his only major championship.

Goodman's victory 93 years ago was the eighth and most recent by an amateur at the U.S. Open; Bobby Jones won four, the last in 1930 was part of his grand slam.

Goodman, an Omaha insurance salesman, opened with a 75 (+3), which put him seven strokes off the lead held by 1927 champion Tommy Armour. His second round was one for the record books, as he tied Gene Sarazen's tournament record with a 66 (−6). Following a third round 70 in which he needed just 28 putts, Goodman had a six-stroke lead over Guldahl.

After opening the final round with a par, eagle, and birdie, Goodman's play suddenly declined as he shot six over par for the next six holes; the lead was reduced to two strokes at the turn. Goodman bounced back and recorded four consecutive pars, then bogeyed 14, birdied 15, and bogeyed 17. A par at the last gave him a 76 and a 287 total. At the final hole, Guldahl found a greenside bunker and missed the four-foot (1.2 m) putt to save par that would have forced a Sunday playoff. Brothers Mortie and Olin Dutra of California placed in the top ten at sixth and seventh, respectively. Olin won the title the next year at Merion, near Philadelphia.

A number of amateurs came close to winning majors in the generation after Goodman's victory. Frank Stranahan tied for second at the 1947 Open Championship and 1953 Open Championship. Ken Venturi, age 24, led the Masters in 1956 for the first three rounds but finished runner-up by a stroke. At the 1960 U.S. Open 20-year-old Jack Nicklaus of Ohio State led midway through the final round and finished runner-up, two strokes back. The final runner-up finish for an amateur was at the 1961 Masters Tournament when Charles Coe tied for second with Arnold Palmer. However Goodman was the last amateur to ever win a major championship. The most recent top ten finish at the U.S. Open by an amateur was in 1971 when 54-hole leader Jim Simons of Wake Forest placed fifth.

Goodman's only other top ten finish at the U.S. Open was in 1937, in eighth place as low amateur; he won the U.S. Amateur championship later that year.

== Round summaries ==
=== First round ===
Thursday, June 8, 1933

Place	Player	Score	To par
1	(United States) Tommy Armour	68	−4
T2	(United States) Henry Ciuci	73	+1
T2	(United States) Walter Hagen	73	+1
T2	(United States) Maurice McCarthy (a)	73	+1
T2	(United States) Johnny Revolta	73	+1
T2	(United States) Neil White (a)	73	+1
T2	(United States) Craig Wood	73	+1
T8	(United States) Tom Creavy	74	+2
T8	(Australia) Joe Kirkwood, Sr.	74	+2
T8	(United States) Carl Gustafson	74	+2
T8	(United States) Ky Laffoon	74	+2
T8	(United States) C.H. Mayo	74	+2
T8	(United States) Gene Sarazen	74	+2
T8	(United States) Al Watrous	74	+2
T8	(United States) L.J. Wilcox	74	+2

=== Second round ===
Friday, June 9, 1933

Place	Player	Score	To par
1	(United States) Johnny Goodman (a)	75-66=141	−3
2	(United States) Tommy Armour	68-75=143	−1
3	(Australia) Joe Kirkwood, Sr.	74-70=144	E
4	(United States) Olin Dutra	75-71=146	+2
T5	(United States) Ralph Guldahl	76-71=147	+3
T5	(United States) Craig Wood	73-74=147	+3
T7	(United States) Mortie Dutra	75-73=148	+4
T7	(England) Philip Perkins	76-72=148	+4
T9	(United States) Leo Diegel	78-71=149	+5
T9	(United States) Abe Espinosa	76-73=149	+5
T9	(United States) Walter Hagen	73-76=149	+5
T9	(United States) Maurice McCarthy (a)	73-76=149	+5
T9	(United States) Johnny Revolta	73-76=149	+5
T9	(United States) Paul Runyan	75-74=149	+5
T9	(United States) Macdonald Smith	77-72=149	+5

=== Third round ===
Saturday, June 10, 1933 (morning)

Place	Player	Score	To par
1	(United States) Johnny Goodman (a)	75-66-70=211	−5
2	(United States) Ralph Guldahl	76-71-70=217	+1
3	(United States) Craig Wood	73-74-71=218	+2
4	(United States) Tommy Armour	68-75-76=219	+4
5	(United States) Mortie Dutra	75-73-72=220	+4
6	(United States) Olin Dutra	75-71-75=221	+5
T7	(United States) Lester Bolstad (a)	76-74-73=223	+7
T7	(United States) George Dawson (a)	78-74-71=223	+7
T7	(Australia) Joe Kirkwood, Sr.	74-70-79=223	+7
T7	(United States) Gus Moreland (a)	76-76-71=223	+7

=== Final round ===
Saturday, June 10, 1933 (afternoon)

Place	Player	Score	To par	Money ($)
1	(United States) Johnny Goodman (a)	75-66-70-76=287	−1	0
2	(United States) Ralph Guldahl	76-71-70-71=288	E	1,000
3	(United States) Craig Wood	73-74-71-72=290	+2	750
T4	(United States) Tommy Armour	68-75-76-73=292	+4	600
T4	(United States) Walter Hagen	73-76-77-66=292	+4	600
6	(United States) Mortie Dutra	75-73-72-74=294	+6	450
T7	(United States) Olin Dutra	75-71-75-74=295	+7	350
T7	(United States) Gus Moreland (a)	76-76-71-72=295	+7	0
T9	(United States) Clarence Clark	80-72-72-72=296	+8	156
T9	(United States) Johnny Farrell	75-77-72-72=296	+8	156
T9	(United States) Willie Goggin	79-73-73-71=296	+8	156
T9	(Australia) Joe Kirkwood, Sr.	74-70-79-73=296	+8	156

(a) denotes amateur

=== Scorecard ===
Final round

Hole	1	2	3	4	5	6	7	8	9	10	11	12	13	14	15	16	17	18
Par	4	5	3	4	4	4	5	3	4	4	4	5	3	4	5	3	4	4
(United States) Goodman	−5	−7	−8	−7	−7	−5	−4	−3	−2	−2	−2	−2	−2	−1	−2	−2	−1	−1
(United States) Guldahl	+2	+1	+1	+1	+1	+1	+1	E	E	E	E	−1	−1	−1	−1	−1	−1	E

Cumulative tournament scores, relative to par

Eagle	Birdie	Bogey	Double bogey
