= 1932 PGA Championship =

Coordinates: 45.006°N 93.056°W

Tournament information
- Dates: August 30 – September 4, 1932
- Location: Maplewood, Minnesota
- Course: Keller Golf Course
- Organized by: PGA of America
- Tour: PGA Tour
- Format: Match play - 5 rounds

Statistics
- Par: 72
- Length: 6,686 yards (6,114 m)
- Field: 104 players, 32 to match play
- Cut: 153 (+9), playoff
- Prize fund: $7,200
- Winner's share: $1,000

Champion
- (United States) Olin Dutra
- def. Frank Walsh, 4 and 3

Location in the United States
Location in Minnesota

The 1932 PGA Championship was the 15th PGA Championship, held August 30 to September 4 at Keller Golf Course in Maplewood, Minnesota, a suburb north of Saint Paul. Then a match play championship, Olin Dutra won the first of his two major titles, defeating Frank Walsh 4 and 3. Dutra was also the medalist in the 36-hole stroke play qualifier on Tuesday.

Defending champion Tom Creavy lost in the semifinals to Walsh in 38 holes. Two-time champion Gene Sarazen opted to participate in sectional qualifying, but did not advance; he returned the following year and won a third title.

Keller Golf Course, a municipal facility owned and operated by Ramsey County, hosted the PGA Championship again in 1954.

== Format ==
The match play format at the PGA Championship in 1932 called for 12 rounds (216 holes) in six days:

- Tuesday – 36-hole stroke play qualifier
  - defending champion Tom Creavy and top 31 professionals advanced to match play
- Wednesday – first round – 36 holes
- Thursday – second round – 36 holes
- Friday – quarterfinals – 36 holes
- Saturday – semifinals – 36 holes
- Sunday – final – 36 holes

== Final results ==
Sunday, September 4, 1932

Place	Player	Money ($)
1	(United States) Olin Dutra	1,000
2	(United States) Frank Walsh	500
T3	(United States) Tom Creavy	250
T3	(United States) Ed Dudley	250
T5	(United States) Herman Barron	200
T5	(United States) Al Collins	200
T5	(Scotland) Bobby Cruickshank	200
T5	(United States) Ralph Stonehouse	200

== Final eight bracket ==
Quarter-finals; September 2
Olin Dutra	5&4
Herman Barron
Ed Dudley	38h
Al Collins
Frank Walsh	8&7
Bobby Cruickshank
Tom Creavy	3&2
Ralph Stonehouse

Semi-finals; September 3
Olin Dutra	3&2
Ed Dudley
Frank Walsh	38h
Tom Creavy

Finals; September 4
Olin Dutra	4&3
Frank Walsh

== Final match scorecards ==
Morning

Hole	1	2	3	4	5	6	7	8	9	10	11	12	13	14	15	16	17	18
Par	4	4	5	3	4	3	5	4	4	4	4	5	3	4	3	4	4	5
(United States) Dutra	4	4	4	4	4	3	4	4	4	4	4	5	3	4	3	4	5	4
(United States) Walsh	4	4	4	3	4	2	4	5	4	4	3	6	3	4	4	5	4	4
Leader	–	–	–	W1	W1	W2	W2	W1	W1	W1	W2	W1	W1	W1	–	D1	–	–

Afternoon

Hole	1	2	3	4	5	6	7	8	9	10	11	12	13	14	15	16	17	18
Par	4	4	5	3	4	3	5	4	4	4	4	5	3	4	3	4	4	5
(United States) Dutra	4	4	5	3	4	2	4	3	4	4	4	5	3	4	3	Dutra wins 4 & 3		
(United States) Walsh	5	4	5	3	4	3	4	3	4	5	4	6	3	4	3	Dutra wins 4 & 3		
Leader	D1	D1	D1	D1	D1	D2	D2	D2	D2	D3	D3	D4	D4	D4	D4	Dutra wins 4 & 3		

Birdie	Bogey
