= 1931 PGA Championship =

Coordinates: 41.845°N 71.359°W

Tournament information
- Dates: September 14–19, 1931
- Location: Rumford, Rhode Island
- Course: Wannamoisett Country Club
- Organized by: PGA of America
- Tour: PGA Tour
- Format: Match play - 5 rounds

Statistics
- Par: 70
- Field: 32 to match play
- Cut: 153 (+13), playoff
- Prize fund: $7,200
- Winner's share: $1,000

Champion
- (United States) Tom Creavy
- def. Denny Shute, 2 and 1

Location in the United States
Location in Rhode Island

The 1931 PGA Championship was the 14th PGA Championship, held September 14–19 at Wannamoisett Country Club in Rumford, Rhode Island, northeast of Providence. Then a match play championship, Tom Creavy, age 20, defeated Gene Sarazen 5 and 3 in the semifinals and Denny Shute 2 and 1 in the finals.

This was the first year the defending champion was exempt from qualifying; Tommy Armour lost in the quarterfinals to Shute, 3 and 1. Sarazen was the medalist in the qualifying with 145 (+5).

Through 2016, Sarazen remains the youngest winner of a modern major title at age 20 (in 1922) and Creavy was just 2 months older. Finalist Shute won consecutive titles in 1936 and 1937.

== Format ==
The match play format at the PGA Championship in 1931 called for 12 rounds (216 holes) in six days:

- Monday – 36-hole stroke play qualifier
  - defending champion Tommy Armour and top 31 professionals advanced to match play
- Tuesday – first round – 36 holes
- Wednesday – second round – 36 holes
- Thursday – quarterfinals – 36 holes
- Friday – semifinals – 36 holes
- Saturday – final – 36 holes

== Final results ==
Saturday, September 19, 1931

Place	Player	Money ($)
1	(United States) Tom Creavy	1,000
2	(United States) Denny Shute	500
T3	(United States) Billy Burke	250
T3	(United States) Gene Sarazen	250
T5	(United States) Tommy Armour	200
T5	(United States) Abe Espinosa	200
T5	(United States) Horton Smith	200
T5	(United States) Cyril Walker	200

== Final eight bracket ==
Quarter-finals; September 17
Tom Creavy	3&1
Cyril Walker
Gene Sarazen	5&4
Horton Smith
Denny Shute	3&1
Tommy Armour
Billy Burke	5&3
Abe Espinosa

Semi-finals; September 18
Tom Creavy	5&3
Gene Sarazen
Denny Shute	1up
Billy Burke

Finals; September 19
Tom Creavy	2&1
Denny Shute

== Final match scorecards ==
Morning

Hole	1	2	3	4	5	6	7	8	9	10	11	12	13	14	15	16	17	18
Par	4	5	3	4	4	4	4	3	4	4	4	3	4	4	3	4	5	4
(United States) Creavy	4	4	2	5	4	5	4	4	4	4	3	4	4	4	3	4	5	6
(United States) Shute	4	4	3	5	4	6	4	3	5	4	4	3	3	4	5	4	5	6
Leader	–	–	C1	C1	C1	C2	C2	C1	C2	C2	C3	C2	C1	C1	C2	C2	C2	C2

Afternoon

Hole	1	2	3	4	5	6	7	8	9	10	11	12	13	14	15	16	17	18
Par	4	5	3	4	4	4	4	3	4	4	4	3	4	4	3	4	5	4
(United States) Creavy	4	5	3	4	4	4	4	3	4	3	3	3	5	5	3	6	5	
(United States) Shute	4	4	3	4	4	5	3	3	4	4	4	4	4	5	2	4	6	
Leader	C2	C1	C1	C1	C1	C2	C1	C1	C1	C2	C3	C4	C3	C3	C2	C1	C2	

Birdie	Bogey	Double bogey
