= 1933 PGA Championship =

Coordinates: 43.068°N 88.041°W

Tournament information
- Dates: August 8–13, 1933
- Location: Wauwatosa, Wisconsin, U.S.
- Course: Blue Mound Country Club
- Organized by: PGA of America
- Tour: PGA Tour
- Format: Match play - 5 rounds

Statistics
- Par: 70
- Length: 6,270 yards (5,733 m)
- Field: 100 players, 32 to match play
- Cut: 146 (+6)
- Prize fund: $7,200
- Winner's share: $1,000

Champion
- (United States) Gene Sarazen
- def. Willie Goggin, 5 and 4

Location in the United States
Location in Wisconsin

The 1933 PGA Championship was the 16th PGA Championship, held August 8–13 at Blue Mound Country Club in Wauwatosa, Wisconsin, a suburb west of Milwaukee. Then a match play championship, Gene Sarazen won the third of his three PGA Championship titles, defeating Willie Goggin 5 and 4. It was the sixth of his seven major titles.

Defending champion Olin Dutra lost in the second round to semifinalist Johnny Farrell, 1 up.

This was Wisconsin's first and only major for 71 years; the PGA Championship returned to the state in 2004 at Whistling Straits near Kohler.

== Format ==
The match play format at the PGA Championship in 1933 called for 12 rounds (216 holes) in six days:

- Tuesday – 36-hole stroke play qualifier
  - defending champion Olin Dutra and top 31 professionals advanced to match play
- Wednesday – first round – 36 holes
- Thursday – second round – 36 holes
- Friday – quarterfinals – 36 holes
- Saturday – semifinals – 36 holes
- Sunday – final – 36 holes

== Final results ==
Sunday, August 13, 1933

Place	Player	Money ($)
1	(United States) Gene Sarazen	1,000
2	(United States) Willie Goggin	500
T3	(United States) Johnny Farrell	250
T3	(United States) Jimmy Hines	250
T5	(United States) Tom Creavy	200
T5	(United States) Ed Dudley	200
T5	(United States) Johnny Golden	200
T5	(United States) Paul Runyan	200

== Final eight bracket ==
Quarter-finals; August 11
Gene Sarazen	6&5
Ed Dudley
Johnny Farrell	5&4
Johnny Golden
Willie Goggin	6&5
Paul Runyan
Jimmy Hines	4&3
Tom Creavy

Semi-finals; August 12
Gene Sarazen	5&4
Johnny Farrell
Willie Goggin	1up
Jimmy Hines

Finals; August 13
Gene Sarazen	5&4
Willie Goggin

== Final match scorecards ==
Morning

Hole	1	2	3	4	5	6	7	8	9	10	11	12	13	14	15	16	17	18
Par	4	4	4	3	4	4	4	3	5	4	4	3	4	5	4	3	4	4
(United States) Sarazen	4	4	5	3	4	4	4	2	4	4	4	4	4	5	3	3	4	4
(United States) Goggin	4	5	5	3	4	3	4	3	4	3	4	4	5	4	4	4	4	3
Leader	–	S1	S1	S1	S1	–	–	S1	S1	–	–	–	S1	–	S1	S2	S2	S1

Afternoon

Hole	1	2	3	4	5	6	7	8	9	10	11	12	13	14	15	16	17	18
Par	4	4	4	3	4	4	4	3	5	4	4	3	4	5	4	3	4	4
(United States) Sarazen	4	4	4	3	3	4	4	4	4	4	4	3	3	4	Sarazen wins 5 and 4			
(United States) Goggin	5	4	5	3	4	4	3	4	5	4	4	3	4	4	Sarazen wins 5 and 4			
Leader	S2	S2	S3	S3	S4	S4	S3	S3	S4	S4	S4	S4	S5	S5	Sarazen wins 5 and 4			

Birdie	Bogey
