= 1971 U.S. Open (golf) =

Coordinates: 40.001°N 75.312°W

Tournament information
- Dates: June 17–21, 1971
- Location: Ardmore, Pennsylvania
- Course(s): Merion Golf Club, East Course
- Organized by: USGA
- Tour: PGA Tour

Statistics
- Par: 70
- Length: 6,544 yards (5,984 m)
- Field: 150 players, 64 after cut
- Cut: 148 (+8)
- Prize fund: $192,200
- Winner's share: $30,000

Champion
- (United States) Lee Trevino
- 280 (E), playoff

Location in the United States
Location in Pennsylvania

The 1971 U.S. Open was the 71st U.S. Open, held June 17–21 at the East Course of Merion Golf Club in Ardmore, Pennsylvania, a suburb west of Philadelphia. Lee Trevino, the 1968 champion, won his second U.S. Open, defeating Jack Nicklaus by three strokes in an 18-hole playoff. It was the second of Trevino's six major titles and the second of four times in which Nicklaus was the runner-up to Trevino in a major; Nicklaus won his third U.S. Open the following year.

The U.S. Open was just part of an outstanding year for Trevino in 1971, and following this playoff win, his confidence soared. Two weeks later, he won the Canadian Open in a playoff; the next week, the British Open, and became the first to win those three national opens in the same year; only Tiger Woods has done it since, in 2000. Trevino won six times on tour in 1971 with two majors and was the PGA Player of the Year. He was named athlete of the year by the Associated Press and Sporting News, and was the Sports Illustrated "Sportsman of the Year." Trevino was the first to win the U.S. and British Opens in the same year in 18 years, last accomplished by Ben Hogan in 1953. The others were Gene Sarazen in 1932 and amateur Bobby Jones in 1926 and 1930, his grand slam year. Subsequent winners of both were Tom Watson in 1982 and Woods in 2000.

For Jim Simons, a Pennsylvania native entering his senior year at Wake Forest, his fifth-place finish remains the most recent top ten by an amateur at the U.S. Open. It is the best since Nicklaus' tie for fourth in 1961, following his runner-up finish the year before at age 20 in 1960. The last victory by an amateur at any major was at the U.S. Open in 1933, won by Johnny Goodman of Omaha. Bobby Jones won four U.S. Opens as an amateur; the last in 1930 was part of his grand slam.

This was the third U.S. Open played at Merion, which previously hosted in 1934 and 1950; a fourth was played in 1981, and a fifth in 2013.

== Course layout ==
East Course

Hole	1	2	3	4	5	6	7	8	9	Out	10	11	12	13	14	15	16	17	18	In	Total
Yards	355	535	183	600	426	420	350	360	195	3,424	312	370	405	129	414	378	430	224	458	3,120	6,544
Par	4	5	3	5	4	4	4	4	3	36	4	4	4	3	4	4	4	3	4	34	70

Lengths of the course for previous U.S. Opens:

- 1950: 6,694 yards (6,121 m), par 70
- 1934: 6,694 yards (6,121 m), par 70

Before the 1971 championship the course was measured for the first time in decades using more accurate equipment and found the previous yardage of 6694 was incorrect and changed to 6544 yards.

== Round summaries ==
=== First round ===
Thursday, June 17, 1971

Place	Player	Score	To par
1	(United States) Labron Harris Jr.	67	−3
T2	(United States) Bob Goalby	68	−2
T2	(United States) Doug Sanders	68	−2
T2	(United States) Lanny Wadkins (a)	68	−2
T5	(United States) Jim Colbert	69	−1
T5	(United States) Jack Nicklaus	69	−1
T5	(United States) Bobby Nichols	69	−1
T8	(United States) Gay Brewer	70	E
T8	(United States) Charles Coody	70	E
T8	(United States) Dale Douglass	70	E
T8	(United States) Ralph Johnston	70	E
T8	(United States) Johnny Miller	70	E
T8	(United States) Chi-Chi Rodríguez	70	E
T8	(United States) John Schlee	70	E
T8	(United States) Leonard Thompson	70	E
T8	(United States) Lee Trevino	70	E
T8	(United States) Tom Weiskopf	70	E

=== Second round ===
Friday, June 18, 1971

Place	Player	Score	To par
T1	(United States) Jim Colbert	69-69=138	−2
T1	(United States) Bob Erickson	71-67=138	−2
3	(United States) Jerry McGee	72-67=139	−1
4	(United States) Gay Brewer	70-70=140	E
T5	(United States) Arnold Palmer	73-68=141	+1
T5	(Australia) Bruce Devlin	72-69=141	+1
T5	(United States) George Archer	71-70=141	+1
T5	(United States) Chi-Chi Rodríguez	70-71=141	+1
T5	(United States) Bobby Nichols	69-72=141	+1
T5	(United States) Jack Nicklaus	69-72=141	+1

=== Third round ===
Saturday, June 19, 1971

Four strokes back after 36 holes, amateur Simons shot a five under 65 in the third round, one off the U.S. Open record, to take the 54-hole lead. He got out to a fast start on Saturday and was five under for the round after ten holes. Simons played even-par on the last eight and ended with seven birdies and two bogeys to lead Nicklaus by two strokes.

Place	Player	Score	To par
1	(United States) Jim Simons (a)	71-71-65=207	−3
2	(United States) Jack Nicklaus	69-72-68=209	−1
3	(United States) Bobby Nichols	69-72-69=210	E
T4	(United States) Lee Trevino	70-72-69=211	+1
T4	(United States) George Archer	71-70-70=211	+1
T4	(United States) Jim Colbert	69-69-73=211	+1
T4	(United States) Bob Erickson	71-67-73=211	+1
T8	(United States) Ken Still	71-72-69=212	+2
T8	(United States) Larry Hinson	71-71-70=212	+2
T8	(Australia) Bruce Devlin	72-69-71=212	+2

==== Scorecard ====
Third round

Hole	1	2	3	4	5	6	7	8	9	10	11	12	13	14	15	16	17	18
Par	4	5	3	5	4	4	4	4	3	4	4	4	3	4	4	4	3	4
(United States) Simons	+2	+1	+1	+1	+1	E	E	−1	−2	−3	−3	−2	−3	−3	−3	−4	−3	−3
(United States) Nicklaus	E	E	E	E	E	−1	−1	−1	−1	−1	−1	−1	−1	−1	−1	−1	−1	−1

Cumulative tournament scores, relative to par

Birdie	Bogey

=== Final round ===
Sunday, June 20, 1971

In the final pairing with Nicklaus, 21-year-old Simons retained the lead through the first nine holes of the final round, and was one shot back on the 18th tee. Needing a birdie to tie, his tee shot found the thick rough; a double bogey six yielded a 76 and he finished three strokes back in a tie for fifth place. Trevino took the lead with a birdie at 14, but then missed an 8-footer (2.4 m) for par at the last. He backed off before the putt after a disturbance in the gallery. Nicklaus's 15-foot (4.5 m) birdie putt for the win on the 72nd green also narrowly missed, and he settled for par to force a Monday afternoon playoff. Bob Rosburg also had a chance to join the playoff with a birdie at the last, but he three-putted for bogey and finished two shots back.

Place	Player	Score	To par	Money ($)
T1	(United States) Lee Trevino	70-72-69-69=280	E	Playoff
T1	(United States) Jack Nicklaus	69-72-68-71=280	E	Playoff
T3	(United States) Jim Colbert	69-69-73-71=282	+2	9,000
T3	(United States) Bob Rosburg	71-72-70-69=282	+2	9,000
T5	(United States) George Archer	71-70-70-72=283	+3	6,500
T5	(United States) Johnny Miller	70-73-70-70=283	+3	6,500
T5	(United States) Jim Simons (a)	71-71-65-76=283	+3	0
8	(United States) Raymond Floyd	71-75-67-71=284	+4	5,000
T9	(United States) Gay Brewer	70-70-73-72=285	+5	3,325
T9	(United States) Larry Hinson	71-71-70-73=285	+5	3,325
T9	(United States) Bobby Nichols	69-72-69-75=285	+5	3,325
T9	(United States) Bert Yancey	75-69-69-72=285	+5	3,325

(a) denotes amateur

==== Scorecard ====
Final round

Hole	1	2	3	4	5	6	7	8	9	10	11	12	13	14	15	16	17	18
Par	4	5	3	5	4	4	4	4	3	4	4	4	3	4	4	4	3	4
(United States) Trevino	+1	E	E	E	E	E	E	+1	+1	+1	+1	E	E	−1	−1	−1	−1	E
(United States) Nicklaus	−1	−1	−1	−2	E	E	E	E	E	E	E	E	E	E	E	E	E	E
(United States) Simons	−3	−2	−2	−2	−1	−1	−1	−1	−1	E	E	E	E	+1	+1	+1	+1	+3

Cumulative tournament scores, relative to par

Birdie	Bogey	Double bogey

=== Playoff ===
Monday, June 21, 1971

Prior to the playoff, the first at the U.S. Open since 1966, Trevino and Nicklaus, both 31, were involved in a famous incident on the first tee involving a toy rubber snake. Trevino had acquired it at a zoo gift shop and used it earlier in the week along, with a pith helmet and hatchet during a whimsical photo shoot emphasizing Merion's thick and penal rough. Hot and humid in the early afternoon, Trevino reached into his golf bag for a fresh glove, and came across the snake, and took it out to entertain the crowd. Nicklaus then asked him to toss it over, which Trevino did. Nicklaus picked it up, laughed with the crowd, then threw it back to Trevino. It would later be written that Trevino had tossed the snake at Nicklaus in an attempt to unnerve his rival; in reality, Nicklaus was the one who asked him to throw the snake.

When the playoff began, Trevino bogeyed the first hole, and Nicklaus took the lead, but then hit two poor bunker shots on the next two, allowing Trevino to open a two-stroke lead. Although Nicklaus cut into the lead several times, to within one stroke as late as the 12th tee, Trevino never relinquished it. He carded a 68 to Nicklaus' 71 to win by three. Nicklaus won his third U.S. Open the following year in 1972 at Pebble Beach, and a record-tying fourth at Baltusrol at age 40 in 1980.

Television coverage by ABC Sports for the Monday playoff was scheduled for just an hour, beginning at 4:30 p.m. EDT. A 35-minute weather delay after the sixth hole allowed for lengthened coverage.

Place	Player	Score	To par	Money ($)
1	(United States) Lee Trevino	68	−2	30,000
2	(United States) Jack Nicklaus	71	+1	15,000

==== Scorecard ====
Playoff

Hole	1	2	3	4	5	6	7	8	9	10	11	12	13	14	15	16	17	18
Par	4	5	3	5	4	4	4	4	3	4	4	4	3	4	4	4	3	4
(United States) Trevino	+1	+1	+1	+1	+1	+1	+1	E	E	E	E	−1	−1	−1	−2	−2	−2	−2
(United States) Nicklaus	E	+1	+3	+3	+2	+2	+2	+2	+1	+2	+1	+1	+1	+1	E	E	+1	+1

Birdie	Bogey	Double bogey
