= 1935 Masters Tournament =

- Front cover of the 1935 Masters Yearbook

Tournament information
- Dates: April 4–8, 1935
- Location: Augusta, Georgia; 33.503°N 82.020°W
- Course: Augusta National Golf Club
- Organized by: Augusta National Golf Club
- Tour: PGA Tour

Statistics
- Par: 72
- Length: 6,700 yards (6,126 m)
- Field: 65 players
- Cut: None
- Prize fund: $5,000
- Winner's share: $1,500

Champion
- (United States) Gene Sarazen
- 282 (−6), playoff

Location map
- Location in the United States Location in Georgia

The 1935 Masters Tournament was the second Masters Tournament, then still known as the "Augusta National Invitation Tournament," held April 4–8 at Augusta National Golf Club in Augusta, Georgia, US.

In a change from the first year, the nines were switched to their present order, with the finishing hole at Holly. In the fourth round, Gene Sarazen holed a double eagle (235 yards, 4 wood) to tie Craig Wood and force a 36-hole playoff. This second shot at Firethorn, the par-5 15th hole, then 485 yards (443 m), is referred to in golf as the "shot heard 'round the world."

Sarazen won the Monday playoff by five strokes, even-par 144 to 149 (+5), and parred the 15th hole in both rounds. Tournament co-founder and host Bobby Jones finished at 297, fifteen strokes back in a tie for 25th place. The purse was $5,000 and the winner's share was $1,500.

== Course ==
Hole	Yards	Par	Hole	Yards	Par
1	400	4	10	430	4
2	525	5	11	415	4
3	350	4	12	150	3
4	190	3	13	480	5
5	440	4	14	425	4
6	185	3	15	485	5
7	340	4	16	145	3
8	500	5	17	400	4
9	420	4	18	420	4
Out	3,350	36	In	3,350	36
Source:			Total	6,700	72

== Round summaries ==
=== First round ===
Thursday, April 4, 1935

Place	Player	Score	To par
1	(United States) Henry Picard	67	−5
T2	(United States) Gene Sarazen	68	−4
T2	(United States) Ray Mangrum	68	−4
T2	(United States) Willie Goggin	68	−4
5	(United States) Craig Wood	69	−3
T6	(United States) Olin Dutra	70	−2
T6	(United States) Jimmy Hines	70	−2
T6	(United States) Johnny Revolta	70	−2
T6	(United States) Paul Runyan	70	−2
10	(United States) Byron Nelson	71	−1

=== Second round ===
Friday, April 5, 1935

Place	Player	Score	To par
1	(United States) Henry Picard	67-68=135	−9
T2	(United States) Gene Sarazen	68-71=139	−5
T2	(United States) Ray Mangrum	68-71=139	−5
T4	(United States) Olin Dutra	70-70=140	−4
T4	(United States) Jimmy Hines	70-70=140	−4
6	(United States) Craig Wood	69-72=141	−3
T7	(United States) Walter Hagen	73-69=142	−2
T7	(United States) Paul Runyan	70-72=142	−2
T7	(United States) Willie Goggin	68-74=142	−2
T10	(United States) Sam Parks Jr.	74-70=144	E
T10	(United States) Denny Shute	73-71=144	E
T10	(United States) Vic Ghezzi	73-71=144	E
T10	(United States) Joe Turnesa	73-71=144	E
T10	(United States) Johnny Revolta	70-74=144	E

=== Third round ===
Saturday, April 6, 1935

Place	Player	Score	To par
1	(United States) Craig Wood	69-72-68=209	−7
2	(United States) Olin Dutra	70-70-70=210	−6
3	(United States) Henry Picard	67-68-76=211	−5
4	(United States) Gene Sarazen	68-71-73=212	−4
T5	(United States) Denny Shute	73-71-70=214	−2
T5	(United States) Walter Hagen	73-69-72=214	−2
7	(United States) Ray Mangrum	68-71-76=215	−1
8	(United States) Lawson Little (a)	74-72-70=216	E
T9	(United States) Byron Nelson	71-74-72=217	+1
T9	(United States) Vic Ghezzi	73-71-73=217	+1
T9	(United States) Johnny Revolta	70-74-73=217	+1
T9	(United States) Paul Runyan	70-72-75=217	+1
T9	(United States) Jimmy Hines	70-70-77=217	+1

=== Final round ===
Sunday, April 7, 1935

Place	Player	Score	To par	Money ($)
T1	(United States) Gene Sarazen	68-71-73-70=282	−6	Playoff
T1	(United States) Craig Wood	69-72-68-73=282	−6	Playoff
3	(United States) Olin Dutra	70-70-70-74=284	−4	600
4	(United States) Henry Picard	67-68-76-75=286	−2	500
5	(United States) Denny Shute	73-71-70-73=287	−1	400
6	(United States) Lawson Little (a)	74-72-70-72=288	E	0
7	(United States) Paul Runyan	70-72-75-72=289	+1	300
8	(United States) Vic Ghezzi	73-71-73-73=290	+2	250
T9	(Scotland) Bobby Cruickshank	76-70-73-72=291	+3	138
T9	(United States) Jimmy Hines	70-70-77-74=291	+3	138
T9	(United States) Byron Nelson	71-74-72-74=291	+3	138
T9	(United States) Joe Turnesa	73-71-74-73=291	+3	138

==== Scorecard ====
Final round

Hole	1	2	3	4	5	6	7	8	9	10	11	12	13	14	15	16	17	18
Par	4	5	4	3	4	3	4	5	4	4	4	3	5	4	5	3	4	4
(United States) Sarazen	−4	−5	−5	−4	−4	−4	−4	−4	−3	−2	−2	−2	−3	−3	−6	−6	−6	−6
(United States) Wood	−6	−7	−6	−6	−5	−4	−4	−4	−4	−3	−3	−3	−4	−5	−6	−5	−5	−6
(United States) Dutra	−5	−5	−3	−2	−2	−2	−1	−1	E	−1	−1	−1	−2	−2	−3	−4	−4	−4
(United States) Picard	−4	−4	−4	−3	−2	−2	−2	−3	−3	−3	−3	−3	−3	−3	−4	−4	−3	−2

Cumulative tournament scores, relative to par

Double Eagle	Eagle	Birdie	Bogey	Double bogey

=== Playoff ===
Monday, April 8, 1935

Place	Player	Score	To par	Money ($)
1	(United States) Gene Sarazen	71-73=144	E	1,500
2	(United States) Craig Wood	75-74=149	+5	800

==== Scorecards ====
Morning round

Hole	1	2	3	4	5	6	7	8	9	10	11	12	13	14	15	16	17	18
Par	4	5	4	3	4	3	4	5	4	4	4	3	5	4	5	3	4	4
(United States) Sarazen	+1	E	E	E	E	+1	E	E	E	−1	−1	−1	−1	−1	−1	−1	−1	−1
(United States) Wood	E	E	E	E	E	E	E	E	E	E	+1	+2	+3	+3	+3	+3	+3	+3

Afternoon round

Hole	1	2	3	4	5	6	7	8	9	10	11	12	13	14	15	16	17	18
Par	4	5	4	3	4	3	4	5	4	4	4	3	5	4	5	3	4	4
(United States) Sarazen	−1	−1	−1	−1	−1	−1	−1	−1	−1	−1	−1	−1	−1	−1	−1	−1	E	E
(United States) Wood	+4	+4	+5	+5	+6	+6	+7	+7	+7	+7	+7	+7	+6	+6	+6	+5	+5	+5

Cumulative playoff scores, relative to par
