= Miami Beach Open =

PGA Tour golf tournament

The Miami Beach Open was a golf tournament on the PGA Tour in the late 1920s and again in the 1950s. It was held at several different courses in the Miami Beach, Florida area.

== Winners ==
Year	Player	Country	Venue(s)	Score	To par	Margin of victory	Runner(s)-up	Winner's share ($)	Ref
1957	Al Balding	Canada	Bayshore	137^	−7	1 stroke	(United States) Chick Harbert	1,200	
1956	Gardner Dickinson	United States	Bayshore	272	−16	1 stroke	(United States) Dow Finsterwald (United States) Billy Maxwell	2,400	
1955	Eric Monti	United States	Bayshore	270	−18	2 strokes	(United States) Bob Rosburg	2,200	
1952–1954: No tournament
1951	Jim Ferrier	Australia	Normandy	273	−15	1 stroke	(United States) Chuck Klein (United States) Sam Snead	2,000	
1950	Sam Snead	United States	Normandy, Bayshore	273	−15	3 strokes	(United States) Lawson Little	2,000	
1930–1949: No tournament
1929	Gene Sarazen	United States	Bayshore, La Gorce	286		1 stroke	(United States) George Christ		
1928	Gene Sarazen	United States	La Gorce, Bayshore	292		3 strokes	(United States) Johnny Farrell		
1927	Gene Sarazen	United States	Bayshore	277	−7	4 strokes	(United States) Jock Hutchison	1,000	

^ 36-hole event
