= Northeast New York PGA Championship =

The Northeast New York PGA Championship is a golf tournament that is the championship of the Northeast New York section of the PGA of America. Armand Farina, World War II veteran and golf course designer, holds the record for most victories with five until Scott Berliner won in 2020 and he currently has 7 wins. Gene Sarazen, winner of 39 PGA Tour events and seven major championships, won the Northeast New York PGA Championship in 1966 at the age of 64.

== Winners ==
- 2026 Michael Shine
- 2025 Chris Sanger
- 2024 Scott Berliner
- 2023 Eric Mabee
- 2022 Justin Hearley
- 2021 Scott Berliner
- 2020 Scott Berliner
- 2019 Scott Berliner
- 2018 Kyle Kressler
- 2017 Jim Jeffers
- 2016 Eric Mabee
- 2015 Scott Berliner
- 2014 Scott Berliner
- 2013 Frank Mellet
- 2012 Scott Berliner
- 2011 Scott Berliner
- 2010 Frank Mellet
- 2009 Anders Mattson
- 2008 Josh Hillman
- 2007 Josh Hillman
- 2006 Jim Jeffers
- 2005 Rocky Catalano
- 2004 Steve Vatter
- 2003 Jim Marston
- 2002 Dal Daily
- 2001 Dal Daily
- 2000 Dal Daily
- 1999 Dal Daily
- 1998 Jim Jeffers
- 1997 Bob Ackerman
- 1996 Peter Gerard
- 1995 Paul Daniels
- 1994 Jim Jeffers
- 1993 Rick Pohle
- 1992 Paul Daniels
- 1991 David Nevatt
- 1990 Peter Baxter
- 1989 Dan Spooner
- 1988 David Nevatt
- 1987 Tom Smack
- 1986 Harvey Bostic, Sr.
- 1985 John Taylor
- 1984 Harvey Bostic, Sr.
- 1983 Jack Polanski
- 1982 Ralph Montoya
- 1981 Dave Philo
- 1980 John Wells
- 1979 John Maurycy
- 1978 Ralph Montoya
- 1977 Lou Merkle
- 1976 Jay Morelli
- 1975 Ron Philo
- 1974 Rudy Goff
- 1973 Bob Haggerty
- 1972 Lou Merkle
- 1971 Ed Bosse
- 1970 John Maurycy
- 1969 Bob Mix
- 1968 Bob Mix
- 1967 Ronnie Matson
- 1966 Gene Sarazen
- 1965 Alex Sinclair
- 1964 Ed Kroll
- 1963 Dan Williams, Jr.
- 1962 Charley Shepard
- 1961 Alex Sinclair
- 1960 Bob Mix
- 1959 Alex Sinclair
- 1958 Art Stuhler
- 1957 Art Stuhler
- 1956 Alex Sinclair
- 1955 Armand Farina
- 1954 George Morrison
- 1953 Armand Farina
- 1952 Jim Farina
- 1951 Armand Farina
- 1950 Frank Stuhler
- 1949 Milan Murasic
- 1948 Milan Murasic
- 1947 Milan Murasic
- 1946 Armand Farina
- 1945 Armand Farina
