= Most PGA Tour wins in a year =

The following is a list of all the occasions in which a golfer has won eight or more tournaments on the PGA Tour in a season. It is complete through 2024.

Wins	Player	Year(s)
18	(United States) Byron Nelson	1945
13	(United States) Ben Hogan	1946
11	(United States) Sam Snead	1950
10	(United States) Ben Hogan	1948
9	(United States) Paul Runyan	1933
9	(United States) Tiger Woods	2000
9	(Fiji) Vijay Singh	2004
8	(United States) Horton Smith	1929
8	(United States) Gene Sarazen	1930
8	(United States) Sam Snead	1938
8	(United States) Byron Nelson	1944
8	(United States) Arnold Palmer	1960, 1962
8	(United States) Johnny Miller	1974
8	(United States) Tiger Woods	1999, 2006

Byron Nelson's record 18 victories came when most of his competitors were on military leave. Ben Hogan missed half the PGA tour season while both Lloyd Mangrum and Jimmy Demaret missed virtually the entire season. Hogan and Demaret played in only 2 of Nelson's 11 straight tournament wins and Mangrum played in none.

== Most PGA Tour wins in two consecutive seasons ==
Wins	Player	Years
26	Byron Nelson	1944–1945
24	Byron Nelson	1945–1946
20	Ben Hogan	1946–1947
18	Ben Hogan	1945–1946
17	Ben Hogan	1947–1948
17	Sam Snead	1949–1950
17	Tiger Woods	1999–2000

== Most PGA Tour wins in three consecutive seasons ==
Wins	Player	Years
32	Byron Nelson	1944–1946
30	Ben Hogan	1946–1948
26	Byron Nelson	1943–1945
25	Ben Hogan	1945–1947
24	Byron Nelson	1945–1947
22	Arnold Palmer	1960–1962
22	Tiger Woods	1999–2001
21	Arnold Palmer	1961–1963
21	Tiger Woods	2005–2007

== See also ==
- Most European Tour wins in a year
