= Nassau Bahamas Open =

Golf tournament formerly on the PGA Tour

Tournament information
- Location: Nassau, Bahamas
- Established: 1928
- Course: Bahamas Country Club
- Tour: PGA Tour
- Format: Stroke play
- Final year: 1928

Final champion
- (United States) Gene Sarazen

The Nassau Bahamas Open was a professional golf tournament on the PGA Tour that was held in March 1928. It was played at the Bahamas Country Club in Nassau in The Bahamas.

The US$5,000 tournament was won by Gene Sarazen, who defeated Johnny Farrell in a sudden-death playoff after both had tied with 132 strokes for two rounds.

== Winners ==
Year	Winner	Score	Margin of victory	Runner-up	Refs
1928	(United States) Gene Sarazen	132	Playoff (Note: Sarazen won with a birdie on the third hole of a sudden-death playoff.)	(United States) Johnny Farrell	
