= Most European Tour wins in a year =

The following represents the golfers who have won five or more tournaments in a season on the European Tour.

| Wins | Season | Player | Nationality |
|---|---|---|---|
| 6 | 1986 | Seve Ballesteros | Spain |
| 5 | 1983 | Nick Faldo | England |
| 5 | 1988 | Seve Ballesteros | Spain |
| 5 | 1999 | Colin Montgomerie | Scotland |
| 5 | 2000 | Lee Westwood | England |

Note: Tiger Woods won five European Tour sanctioned events as a non-member in 2006: two majors, two World Golf Championships, and the Dubai Desert Classic.

== See also ==
- Most PGA Tour wins in a year
