= Kay McMahon =

Personal information
- Nationality: United States
- Born: October 27, 1948 Minneapolis, Minnesota
- Height: 5 ft 10 in (1.78 m)

Career
- Sport: Golf
- College: University of Minnesota Duluth
- Turned professional: 1976

Kay McMahon (born October 27, 1948) is an American professional golfer and Director of Instruction at eduKaytion Golf at the Cranwell Resort and Golf Club in Lenox, Massachusetts.

McMahon became a member of the LPGA Teaching and Club Professionals in (LPGA T&CP) 1978. Starting her career as an amateur she won two Minnesota State Publinks Championships in 1975 and 1976. She is a member of the LPGA T&CP Golf Hall of Fame elected in 2010.

== Early life and education ==
McMahon was born in Minneapolis, Minnesota and graduated from the University of Minnesota Duluth with her Bachelor of Science degree in Physical Education and Health in 1970.

McMahon was a player and coach of the University of Minnesota volleyball team, and competed in the sports of basketball, badminton, softball, track and field, field hockey, and broomball during her college career.

== Amateur career ==
After graduating from college, McMahon played golf competitively by placing first in two Minnesota State Publinks Championships in 1975 and 1976 and winning many other state and local events. As an amateur she competed in her first LPGA Tour event at the Patty Berg Classic held at the Keller Golf Course in St. Paul, Minnesota, in 1975.

McMahon then moved to California to play in the California State Amateur held at Pebble Beach Golf Links where she was a quarter-finalist in 1976 and 1977 beating the young amateur and future LPGA Hall of Famer Patty Sheehan.

McMahon also played in the U.S. Women's Amateur and the Women's Western Amateur in 1977.

== Professional career ==
McMahon turned professional in 1976 by joining the American Golf Tour (AGT) which was a men's and women's tour where she competed as the only woman for six months before joining the Women's Professional Golf Tour (WPGT) which was newly established women's mini-tour based in Palo Alto, California.

Competing on the WPGT over the next six years, McMahon also attended nine LPGA Tour Qualifying Schools where she missed three times by one shot. She played and qualified as a professional in three U.S. Women's Opens in 1976, 1977, and 1978.

In 1976, McMahon continued her professional career by joining the staff at the Arnold Palmer Ironwood Country Club in Palm Desert, California, where she remained and taught for the next ten years, joining the LPGA Teaching and Club Professional Membership in 1978 as a Class A Member.

McMahon was elected into the Professional Golfers' Association of America membership in 1986 and became the first women in the Southern California Section and one of only a handful in the United States at that time. She is a Quarter Century Member of the PGA of America and in 2011 serves on the Northeastern New York Section board of directors.

McMahon had leadership roles in the LPGA T&CP and served one term as Vice-President of the LPGA Western Section, and two terms as LPGA Western Section President from 1994 to 1998 before serving as National President of the LPGA T&CP from 1998 to 1999 and the LPGA board of directors. She has also served as the National Chairperson of the LPGA T&CP Hall of Fame Committee from 2000 to 2013. During her tenure, McMahon was instrumental in restructuring the LPGA T&CP evaluation and certification process and served on various committees, conducting many workshops on golf and teaching.

She was awarded the LPGA Western Section Teacher-of-the Year Award four times, 1991 through 1995 before receiving the LPGA T&CP National Teacher-of-the Year in 1995.

In 2002, McMahon and business partner, Eloise Trainor, founder of the LPGA Futures Tour (now the Symetra Tour), rebranded into eduKaytion Golf, an exclusive golf education company located at the Cranwell Resort, Spa and Golf Club in Lenox, Massachusetts, since January 2012.

== Writings ==
McMahon co-wrote the book Golf, along with Virginia Nance, and Elwood Davis; writing a chapter in the LPGA Guide to Every Shot; and was a contributing editor for Golf Digest magazine and Golf for Women magazine.

== Speaking and media ==
McMahon has been a featured speaker at events and conferences, including the Michigan Coaches Association Annual Conference in 2003, the Wisconsin Coaches Annual Conference in 2001, and the PGA of Denmark in 1997.

McMahon's media experience also includes co-hosting a local TV show for the LPGA Nabisco Dinah Shore tournament in Rancho Mirage, California, and producing "On The Green" TV program for MY4Albany, Albany, New York, 2011 to 2012.

== Awards ==
- 2010 LPGA T&CP – Hall of Fame
- Past National President – LPGA T&CP
- 2010 – Golf Digest – Top 50 Women Teachers
- 2009 – LPGA Ellen Griffin Rolex Award
- Northeastern NY PGA Section – board of directors
