= Mortie Dutra =

American professional golfer

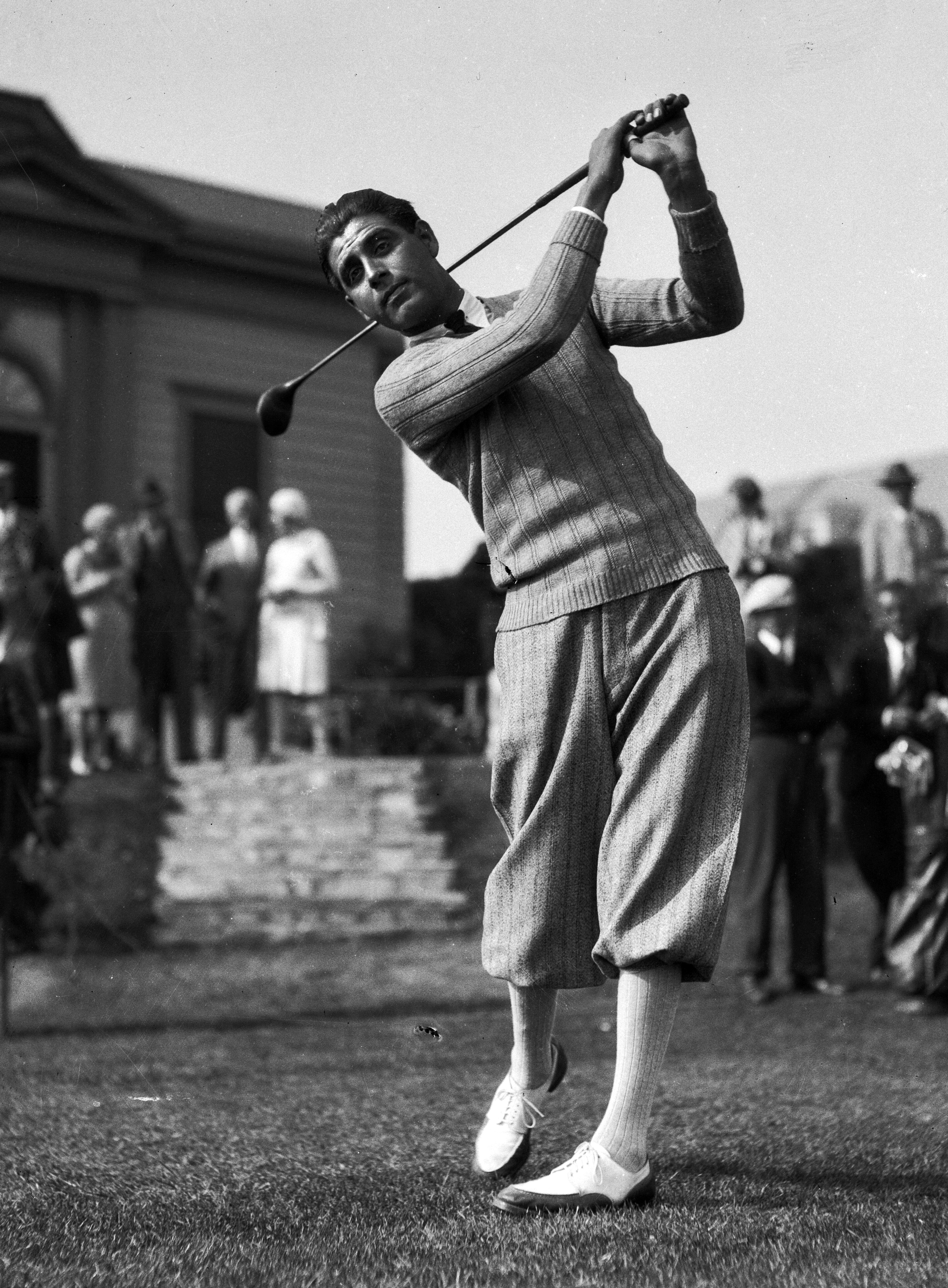
- Dutra in 1931

Personal information
- Full name: Mortimer Francis Dutra
- Nationality: United States
- Born: October 3, 1899 Monterey, California
- Died: August 10, 1988 (aged 88) California
- Height: 6 ft 2 in (1.88 m)
- Weight: 188 lb (85 kg; 13.4 st)

Career
- Sport: Golf
- Status: Professional
- Former tour: PGA Tour
- Professional wins: 5

Best results in major championships
- Masters Tournament: T11: 1934
- PGA Championship: T3: 1925
- U.S. Open: 6th: 1933
- The Open Championship: DNP

Mortimer Francis Dutra (October 3, 1899 – August 10, 1988) was an American professional golfer.

== Early life ==
Dutra was born in Monterey, California. He was the older brother of golfer Olin.

== Professional career ==
Dutta work as a club pro and teaching professional while also competing on the PGA Tour. He was the head pro at Red Run Golf Club in Detroit, Michigan from 1933 to 1942. While there, he won the Michigan Open in 1933 and the Michigan PGA Championship in 1934.

In the majors, Dutra was a semi-finalist in the 1927 PGA Championship, finished sixth at the 1933 U.S. Open and played in the first two Masters Tournaments.

In 1955, Dutra won the PGA Seniors' Championship which would later become a Champions Tour major.

== Professional wins (5) ==
- 1922 Northern California PGA Championship
- 1933 Michigan Open
- 1934 Michigan PGA Championship
- 1955 PGA Seniors' Championship, World Senior Championship

== Results in major championships ==
Tournament	1922	1923	1924	1925	1926	1927	1928	1929	1930	1931	1932	1933	1934	1935	1936	1937	1938	1939
Masters Tournament	NYF	NYF	NYF	NYF	NYF	NYF	NYF	NYF	NYF	NYF	NYF	NYF	T11	T31	DNP	DNP	DNP	DNP
U.S. Open	T47	?	?	?	?	?	?	?	T17	T7	T23	6	T28	T14	T36	?	49	?
PGA Championship	DNP	DNP	R16	SF	DNP	QF	R32	R32	DNP	DNP	DNP	R32	DNP	R32	R32	DNP	DNP	R64

Note: Dutra never played in The Open Championship.
NYF = Tournament not yet founded
DNP = Did not play
R64, R32, R16, QF, SF = Round in which player lost in PGA Championship match play
"T" indicates a tie for a place
Yellow background for top-10
