= Frank Walsh (golfer) =

American professional golfer (1902–1992)

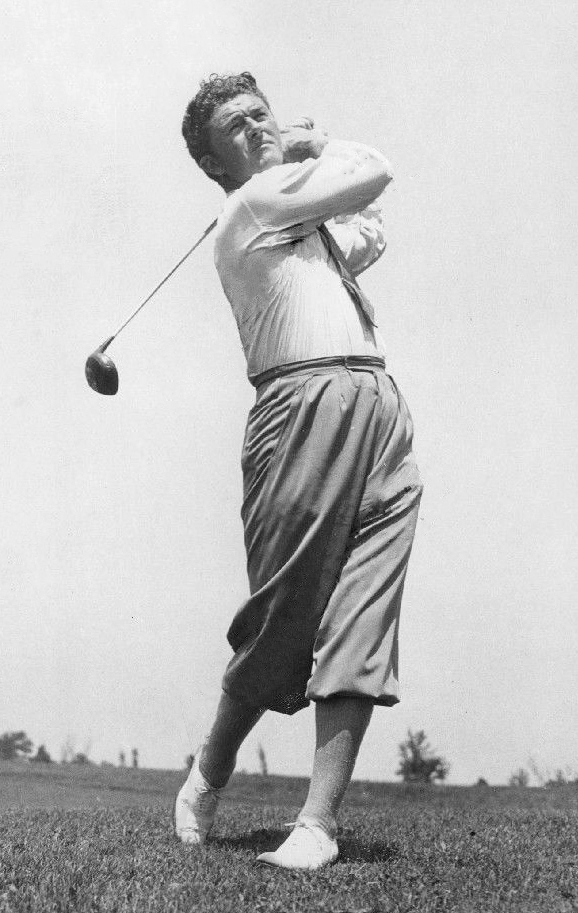
- Walsh in 1933

Personal information
- Full name: Frank Andrew Walsh
- Nationality: United States
- Born: December 23, 1902 Chicago, Illinois, U.S.
- Died: April 7, 1992 (aged 89) Martin, Florida, U.S.

Career
- Sport: Golf
- Status: Professional
- Former tour: PGA Tour
- Professional wins: 5

Number of wins by tour
- PGA Tour: 2

Best results in major championships
- Masters Tournament: T12: 1940
- PGA Championship: 2nd: 1932
- U.S. Open: T10: 1940
- The Open Championship: DNP

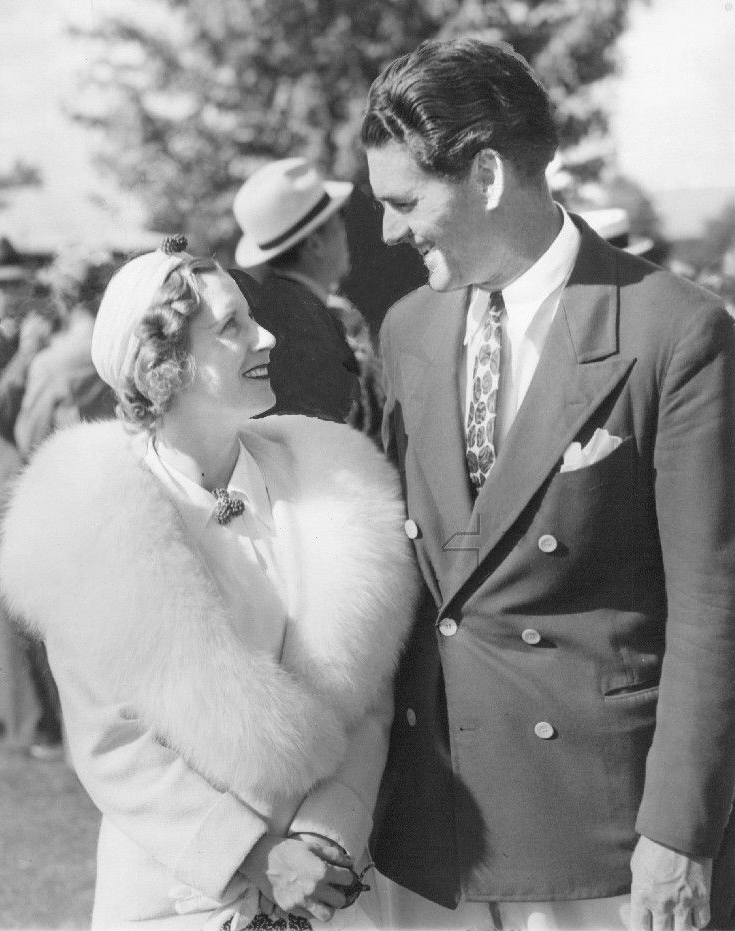
Walsh with wife in 1937

Frank Andrew Walsh (December 23, 1902 – April 7, 1992) was an American professional golfer.

== Early life ==
Walsh was born in Chicago, Illinois. A number of his brothers were professional golfers including his elder brother, Tom, who was president of the PGA of America in 1940 and 1941.

== Professional career ==
Walsh reached the finals of the 1932 PGA Championship, losing to Olin Dutra. He also won two PGA Tour events.

== Professional wins ==
this list may be incomplete

=== PGA Tour wins (2) ===
- 1928 Wisconsin State Open
- 1935 Illinois PGA Championship

=== Other wins ===
- 1938 New Hampshire Open
- 1940 New Jersey PGA Championship
- 1941 New Jersey PGA Championship
