= Tom Creavy =

American professional golfer (1911–1979)

Personal information
- Full name: Thomas Daniel Creavy
- Nationality: United States
- Born: February 3, 1911 Tuckahoe, New York, U.S.
- Died: March 3, 1979 (aged 68) Delray Beach, Florida, U.S.

Career
- Sport: Golf
- Turned professional: c. 1928
- Former tour: PGA Tour
- Professional wins: 2

Number of wins by tour
- PGA Tour: 1

Best results in major championships (wins: 1)
- Masters Tournament: T25: 1934
- PGA Championship: Won: 1931
- U.S. Open: T8: 1934
- The Open Championship: DNP

Thomas Daniel Creavy (February 3, 1911 – March 3, 1979) was an American professional golfer, the winner of the PGA Championship in 1931.

== Early life ==
Creavy was born in Tuckahoe, New York. He learned the game as a caddie at Siwanoy Country Club.

== Professional career ==
In the late 1920s, Creavy turned professional. He was the club professional at the Albany Country Club and Saratoga Spa. He won the PGA Championship at age 20 in 1931 at Wannamoisett Country Club in Rumford, Rhode Island, defeating Gene Sarazen 5 & 3 in the semifinals and Denny Shute 2 & 1 in the finals. Creavy played in 11 major championships, including the inaugural Masters in 1934. He had an outstanding short game, but his competitive playing career was hampered by recurring back problems and shortened by spinal meningitis in 1943.

== Death ==
Creavy died of a heart attack in 1979 at age 68 in Delray Beach, Florida.

== Professional wins (4) ==
=== PGA Tour wins (4) ===
- 1931 (1) PGA Championship, Northeastern New York
- 1932 (1) Northeastern New York PGA
- 1934 (1) San Francisco National Match Play Open

== Major championships ==
=== Wins (1) ===
Year	Championship	Winning score	Runner-up
1931	PGA Championship	2 & 1	(United States) Denny Shute

Note: The PGA Championship was match play until 1958

=== Results timeline ===
Tournament	1930	1931	1932	1933	1934	1935	1936	1937	1938	1939	1940
Masters Tournament	NYF				T25						
U.S. Open	47	T32	T31	T40	T8					T52	CUT
PGA Championship		1	SF	QF	DNQ			DNQ		DNQ	DNQ

Note: Creavy never played in The Open Championship.

Win
Top 10
Did not play

NYF = tournament not yet founded
DNQ = did not qualify for match play portion
CUT = missed the half-way cut
R64, R32, R16, QF, SF = round in which player lost in PGA Championship match play
"T" indicates a tie for a place

== See also ==
- Chronological list of men's major golf champions
- List of men's major championships winning golfers
