= Rumford, Rhode Island =

Section of East Providence, Rhode Island, US

- Rumford Historic District
- U.S. National Register of Historic Places
- U.S. Historic district
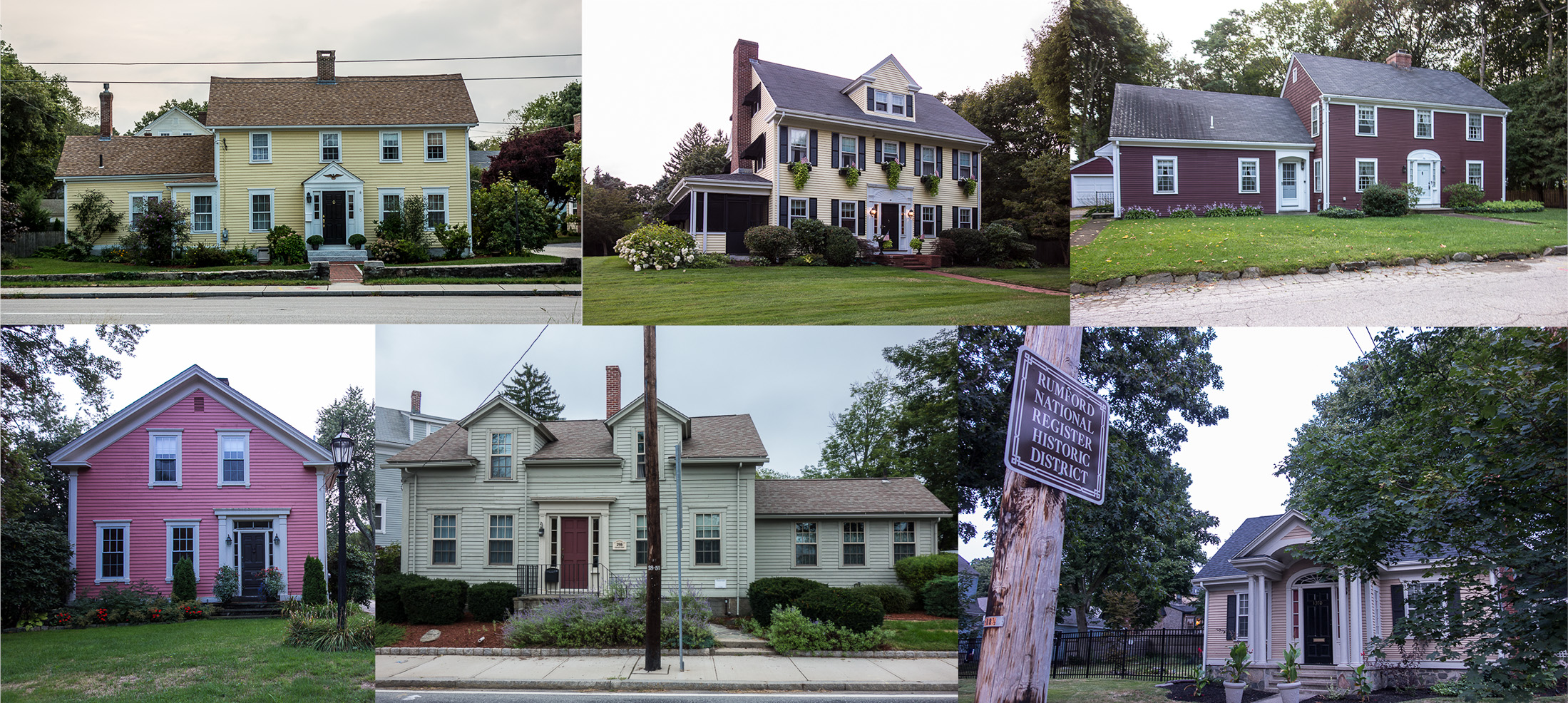

- Location within Rhode Island Location within the United States
- Location: Pleasant St. and Greenwood and Pawtucket Aves, East Providence, Rhode Island
- Coordinates: 41°50′43″N 71°21′07″W
- Area: 150 acres (61 ha)
- Architectural style: Queen Anne, Shingle Style
- MPS: East Providence MRA
- NRHP reference No.: 80000008 (original); 100002778 (increase); 100002777 (decrease)

Significant dates
- Added to NRHP: November 28, 1980
- Boundary increase: August 6, 2018
- Boundary decrease: August 6, 2018

Rumford is the northern section of the city of East Providence, Rhode Island, United States. Also considered a neighborhood or village, the Rumford section of East Providence borders Seekonk, Massachusetts to the east, Pawtucket, Rhode Island to the north, and the Ten Mile River (Seekonk River) to the south.

The zip code for Rumford is 02916, and the population as of 2020 is 8,350.

== History ==
Since the establishment of the separate parish formed by Newman Congregational Church in 1643, Rumford has had a community identity. Rumford has been part of three towns and two states: Rehoboth then Seekonk in Massachusetts, then East Providence in Rhode Island.

Eben Norton Horsford, a Harvard chemist who received the Rumford Chair of Physics in 1847, developed the first practical calcium phosphate baking powder. He co-founded Rumford Chemical Works in 1859, named in honor of Sir Benjamin Thompson, Count Rumford, his benefactor. Rumford Baking Powder was made in the town at the Rumford Chemical Works and received a Post Office, which led to Rumford's current name.

Rumford became part of Rhode Island in 1862.

Wannamoisett Country Club was established in Rumford in 1898 on land rented from Rumford Chemical Works and it hosts the Northeast Amateur Invitational Golf Tournament each year. The 1931 PGA Championship was played here.

About 150 acres (61 ha) of the Rumford area was listed on the National Register of Historic Places in 1980, encompassing the historic heart of old Seekonk and the 19th-century center of East Providence.

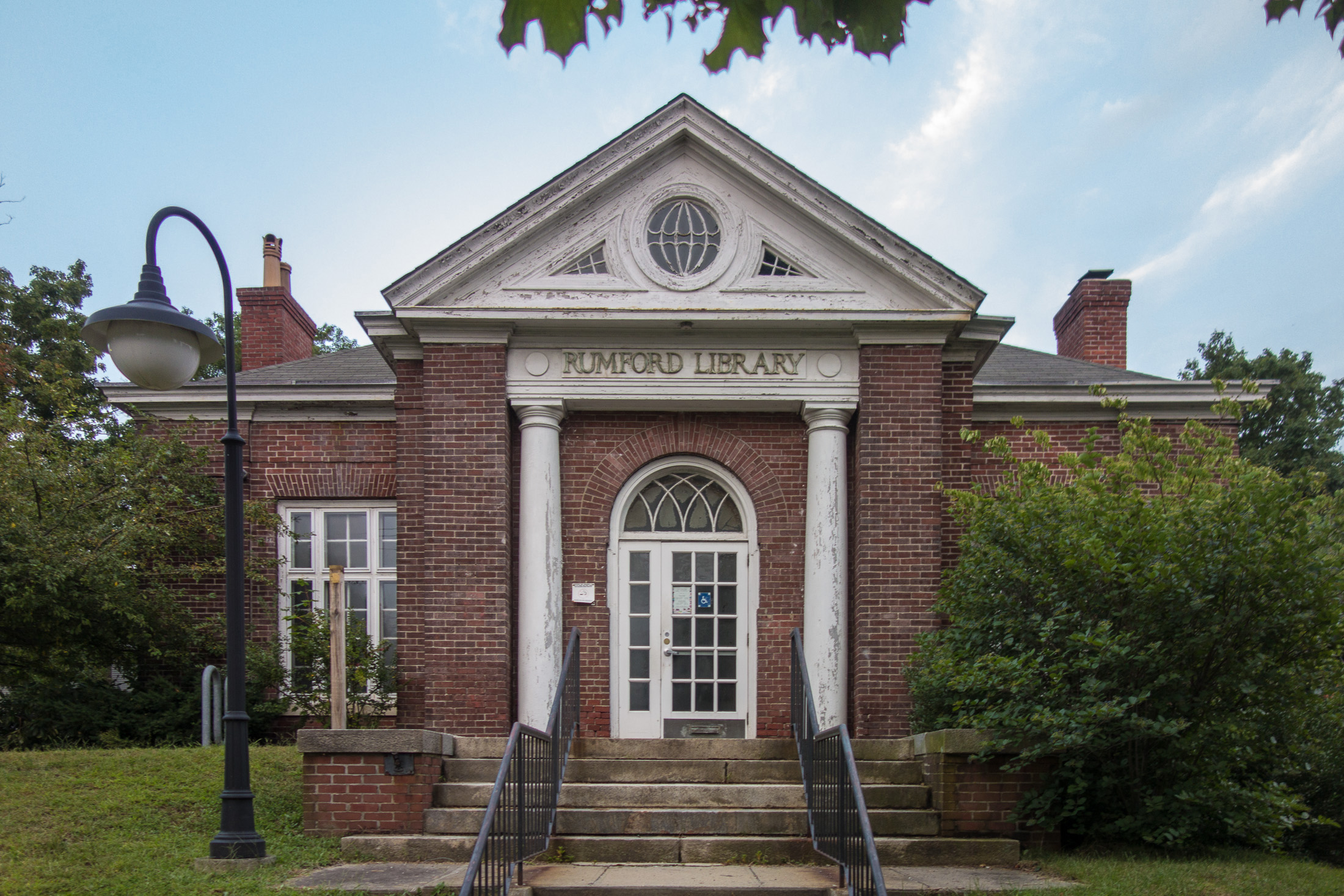
Bridgham Memorial Library

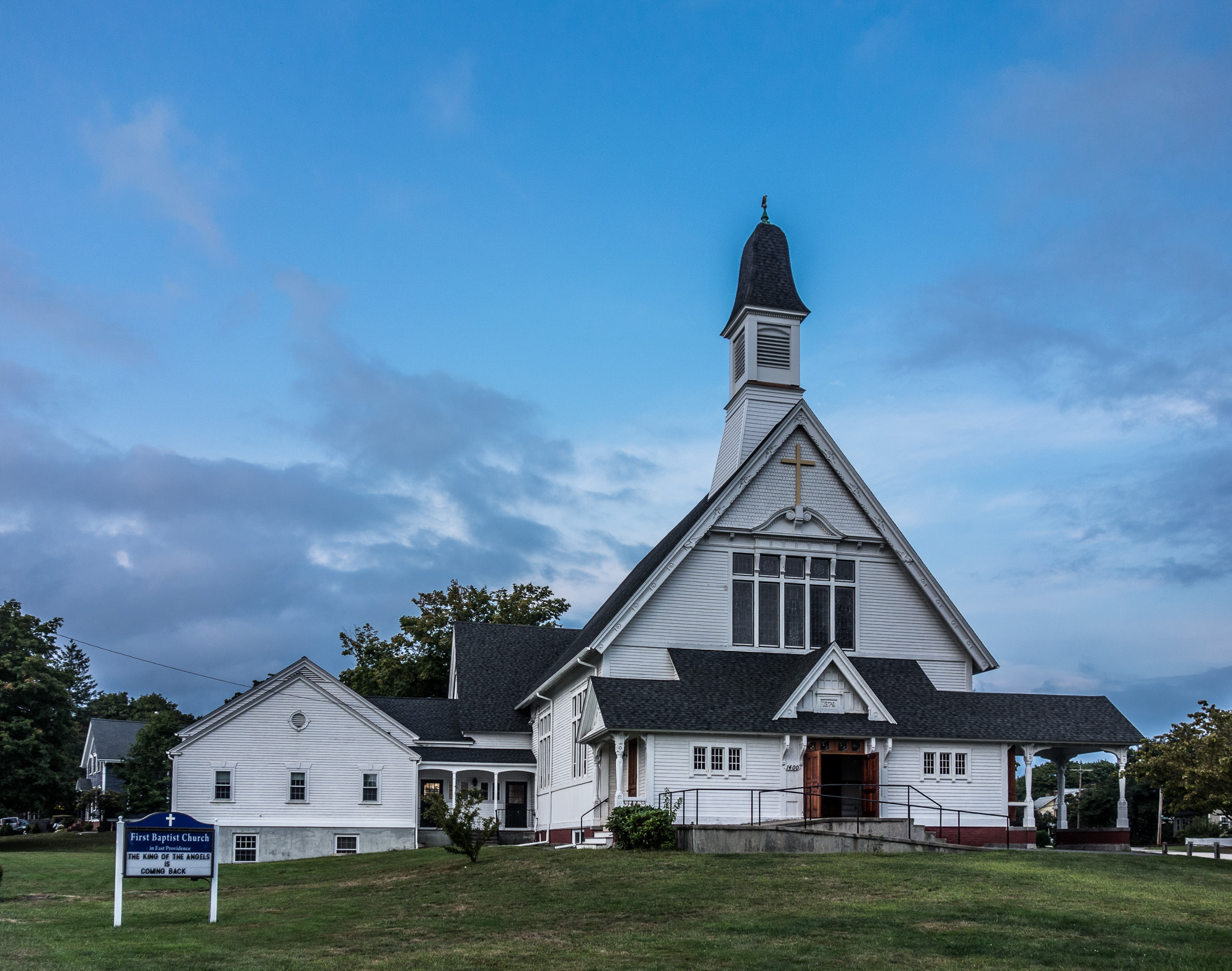
First Baptist Church, designed by William Walker

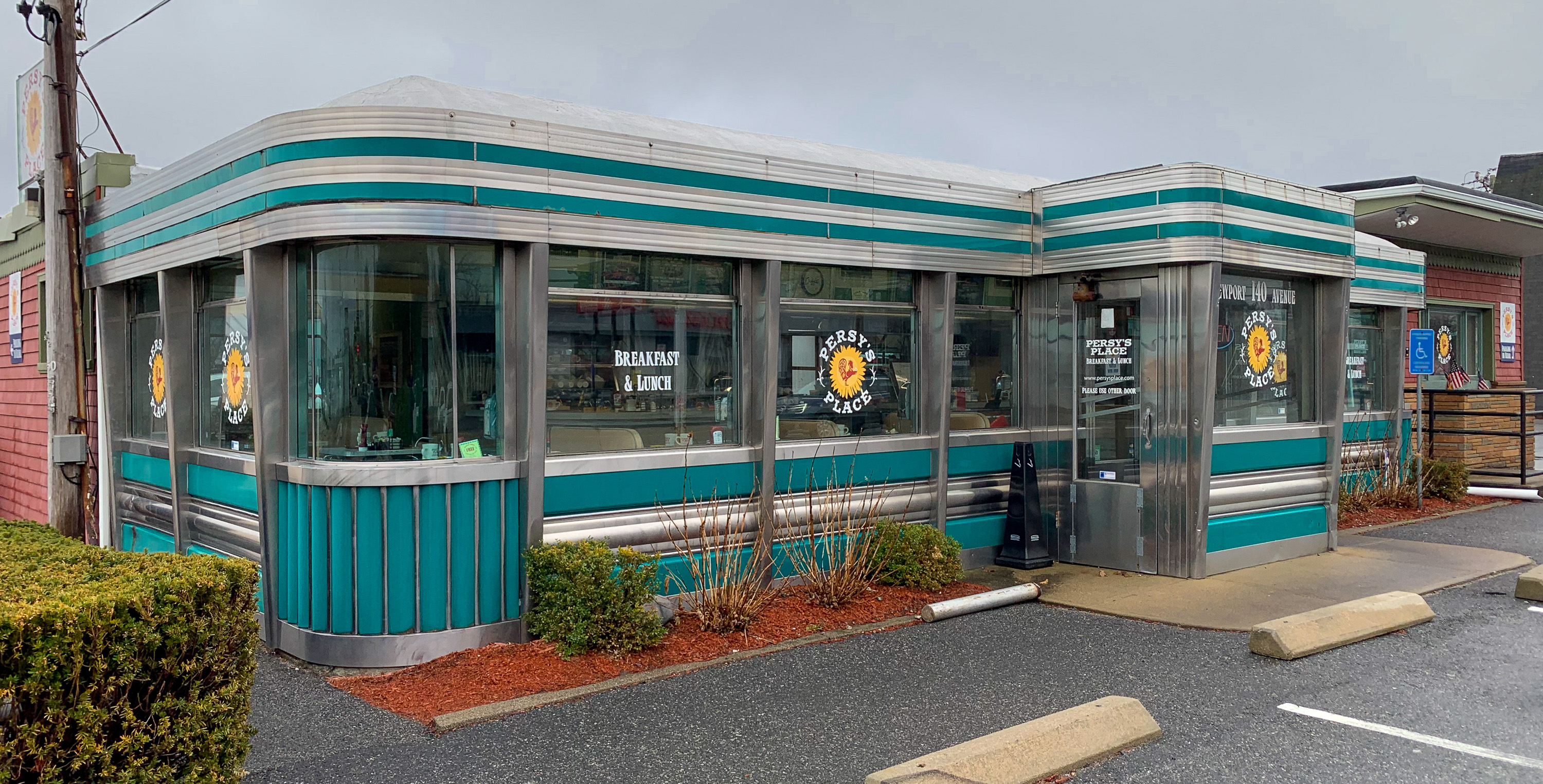
Persy's Place diner, on Newport Avenue (Closed)

== See also ==
- National Register of Historic Places listings in Providence County, Rhode Island
