= Wannamoisett Country Club =

Private golf course in Rumford, Rhode Island

Coordinates: 41°50′45″N 71°21′33″W

The Wannamoisett Country Club is a private golf course located in Rumford, Rhode Island. The course was designed by Donald Ross in 1914 and played host to the 1931 PGA Championship (which was won by Tom Creavy) and hosts the prestigious Northeast Amateur every year. This par 69 course plays 6,688 yards long from the blue tees and 6,399 yards long from the white tees. The red tees play at a par of 75 and is 5,944 yards long. The fairways are lined with very thick rough and the large, undulating greens are difficult to read. It is currently ranked as the #3 course in Rhode Island by Golf Digest.
