= Willie Goggin =

American professional golfer

Personal information
- Full name: William Ambrose Goggin
- Nationality: United States
- Born: February 18, 1906 Chinese Camp, California, U.S.
- Died: August 2, 1979 (aged 73) San Jose, California, U.S.

Career
- Sport: Golf
- Status: Professional
- Former tour: PGA Tour
- Professional wins: 9

Number of wins by tour
- PGA Tour: 2
- Other: 7

Best results in major championships
- Masters Tournament: T4: 1940
- PGA Championship: 2nd: 1933
- U.S. Open: T9: 1933
- The Open Championship: T9: 1952

William Ambrose Goggin (February 18, 1906 – August 2, 1979) was an American professional golfer.

== Career ==
Goggin won twice on the PGA Tour. He also won a number of other significant events, including the Metropolitan PGA Championship and Northern California Open. His best finish in a major championship was runner-up at the 1933 PGA Championship. He lost to Gene Sarazen in the finals, 5 & 4.

In February 1959, Goggin won the PGA Seniors' Championship, at Dunedin, Florida, with a score of 284, a shot ahead of the field. In June of that year faced British PGA Seniors Championship winner Arthur Lees in a match for what was billed as "the world professional senior golf title". To boost attendance, the final 18 holes of the match were scheduled to be played at night. In what the Associated Press called "the first twilight championship match on record," Goggin won the match 5&3. In December that year he also won the National Senior Open at Eldorado Country Club in a 3-way playoff, retaining the title he had won in 1958.

== Professional wins ==
=== PGA Tour wins (2) ===
- 1936 North California Pro Championship-Match
- 1950 Savannah Open

=== Other wins (7) ===
note: this list may be incomplete

- 1935 Northern California Open
- 1936 Northern California Open
- 1944 Metropolitan PGA Championship
- 1958 National Senior Open
- 1959 PGA Seniors' Championship, World Senior Championship, National Senior Open

== Results in major championships ==
Tournament	1929	1930	1931	1932	1933	1934	1935	1936	1937	1938	1939
Masters Tournament	NYF	NYF	NYF	NYF	NYF		T37				
U.S. Open	CUT				T9	T47	T40	T18	CUT	T41	
The Open Championship								T23			
PGA Championship					2	R32		R16	R32	R64	R64

Tournament	1940	1941	1942	1943	1944	1945	1946	1947	1948	1949
Masters Tournament	T4	T9	14	NT	NT	NT				
U.S. Open	T36		NT	NT	NT	NT	T59		CUT	WD
The Open Championship	NT	NT	NT	NT	NT	NT				
PGA Championship			R16	NT	QF			R64		

Tournament	1950	1951	1952	1953	1954	1955	1956	1957	1958	1959
Masters Tournament										
U.S. Open		CUT	CUT	T58		CUT	WD			
The Open Championship			T9							CUT
PGA Championship		R64								

Top 10
Did not play

NYF = tournament not yet founded
NT = no tournament
WD = withdrew
CUT = missed the half-way cut
R64, R32, R16, QF, SF = round in which player lost in PGA Championship match play
"T" indicates a tie for a place

=== Summary ===
Tournament	Wins	2nd	3rd	Top-5	Top-10	Top-25	Events	Cuts made
Masters Tournament	0	0	0	1	2	3	4	4
U.S. Open	0	0	0	0	1	2	16	8
The Open Championship	0	0	0	0	1	2	2	2
PGA Championship	0	1	0	2	4	6	10	10
Totals	0	1	0	3	8	13	32	24

- Most consecutive cuts made – 11 (1938 U.S. Open – 1947 PGA)
- Longest streak of top-10s – 2 (twice)
