= Johnny Goodman =

American amateur and professional golfer (1909–1970)

Personal information
- Full name: John George Goodman
- Nationality: United States
- Born: December 28, 1909 South Omaha, Nebraska, U.S.
- Died: August 8, 1970 (aged 60) South Gate, California, U.S.
- Height: 5 ft 9 in (1.75 m)
- Weight: 165 lb (75 kg; 11.8 st)
- Spouses: Josephine A. Kersigo Goodman (1910–2002) (m. 1938–1970)

Career
- Sport: Golf
- Turned professional: 1960
- Professional wins: 1

Number of wins by tour
- PGA Tour: 1

Best results in major championships (wins: 2)
- Masters Tournament: 43rd: 1936
- PGA Championship: DNP
- U.S. Open: Won: 1933
- The Open Championship: DNP
- U.S. Amateur: Won: 1937
- British Amateur: T9: 1934

John George Goodman (December 28, 1909 – August 8, 1970) was the last amateur golfer to win the U.S. Open, 93 years ago in 1933, and also won the U.S. Amateur in 1937.

== Early life ==
Born to Lithuanian immigrants in South Omaha, Nebraska, Goodman was orphaned at the age of 14. His mother died when he was 11, after giving birth to her 13th child, and his father later abandoned the family. Goodman became a caddie at the Field Club in Omaha, and while a student at Omaha South High School, he won the Omaha city championship in 1925.

== Golf career ==
In 1929, he won the first of five consecutive Nebraska Amateur titles. He won the Trans-Mississippi Amateur three times (1927, 1931, and 1935). He gained national notoriety at age 19 in 1929 when he defeated Bobby Jones in the first round of match play competition at the U.S. Amateur at Pebble Beach.

Goodman served in the U.S. Army during World War II, and did not turn professional until 1960; he supported himself throughout his career by selling insurance. A municipal golf course in Omaha is named for him.

== Tournament wins (60) ==
this list may be incomplete

- 1925 Omaha Caddie Championship, Omaha Metropolitan Golf Championship
- 1927 Trans-Mississippi Amateur
- 1929 Nebraska Amateur
- 1930 Nebraska Amateur
- 1931 Trans-Mississippi Amateur, Nebraska Amateur
- 1932 Nebraska Amateur
- 1933 **U.S. Open**, Nebraska Amateur
- 1935 Trans-Mississippi Amateur
- 1936 Mexican Amateur, Arcola Country Club Invitational
- 1937 **U.S. Amateur**, Mexican Amateur
- 1939 Arcola Country Club Invitational

Major championships wins are shown in bold.

== Major championships ==
=== Wins (1) ===
Year	Championship	54 holes	Winning score	Margin	Runner-up
1933	U.S. Open	6 shot lead	−1 (75-66-70-76=287)	1 stroke	(United States) Ralph Guldahl

=== Amateur wins (1) ===
Year	Championship	Winning score	Runner-up
1937	U.S. Amateur	2 up	(United States) Ray Billows

=== Results timeline ===
Tournament	1927	1928	1929
U.S. Open			T45
U.S. Amateur	DNQ		R16
British Amateur			

Tournament	1930	1931	1932	1933	1934	1935	1936	1937	1938	1939
Masters Tournament	NYF	NYF	NYF	NYF			43			
U.S. Open	T11		T14 LA	**1** LA	T43	T36	T22	8 LA		CUT
U.S. Amateur	R32	R32	2	R32	R128	SF	SF	**1**	QF	R32
British Amateur					R16				R32	

Tournament	1940	1941	1942	1943	1944	1945	1946	1947
Masters Tournament				NT	NT	NT		
U.S. Open	CUT	CUT	NT	NT	NT	NT	CUT	
U.S. Amateur	DNQ	R64	NT	NT	NT	NT	DNQ	R32
British Amateur	NT	NT	NT	NT	NT	NT		

Note: Goodman never played in The Open Championship or the PGA Championship.

Win
Top 10
Did not play

LA = low amateur
NYF = tournament not yet founded
NT = no tournament
CUT = missed the half-way cut
DNQ = did not qualify for match play portion
R128, R64, R32, R16, QF, SF = round in which player lost in match play
"T" indicates a tie for a place

Source for U.S. Open and U.S. Amateur: USGA Championship Database

Source for 1934 British Amateur: Reading Eagle, May 24, 1934, pg. 17.

Source for 1936 Masters: www.masters.com

Source for 1938 British Amateur: Time Magazine, June 6, 1938

== U.S. national team appearances ==
Amateur

- Walker Cup: 1934 (winners), 1936 (winners), 1938
