= Olin Dutra =

American professional golfer

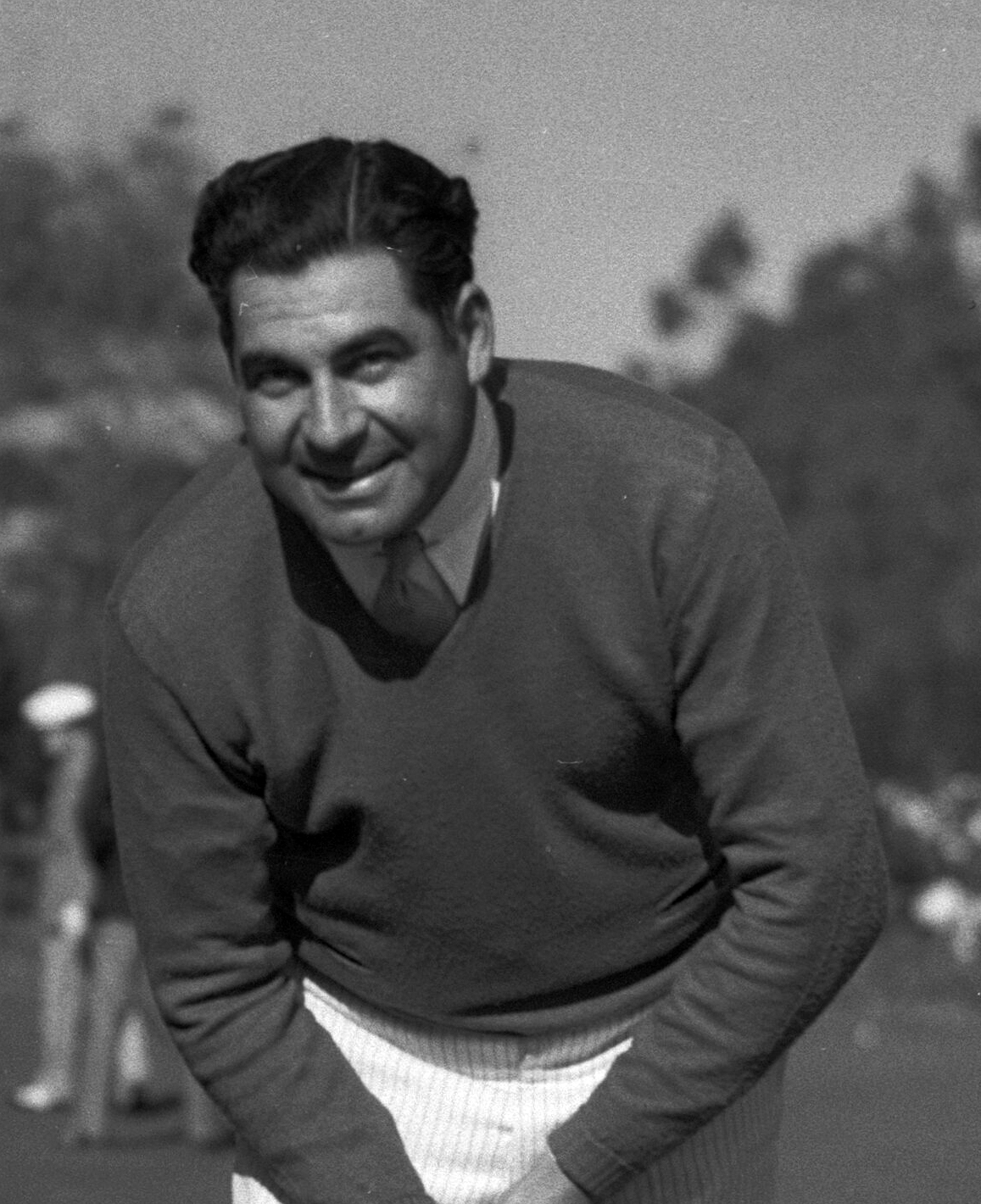
- Dutra in 1934

Personal information
- Full name: Olin Dutra
- Nicknames: King Kong; Slammin' Spaniard; Golden Basque
- Nationality: United States
- Born: January 17, 1901 Monterey, California, U.S.
- Died: May 5, 1983 (aged 82) Newman, California, U.S.
- Height: 6 ft 3 in (191 cm)
- Weight: 230 lb (104 kg; 16 st)
- Spouse: Gladys M. Dutra
- Children: 1 son, 1 daughter

Career
- Sport: Golf
- Turned professional: 1924
- Former tour: PGA Tour
- Professional wins: 20

Number of wins by tour
- PGA Tour: 10
- Other: 10

Best results in major championships (wins: 2)
- Masters Tournament: 3rd: 1935
- PGA Championship: Won: 1932
- U.S. Open: Won: 1934
- The Open Championship: 6th: 1933

Olin A. Dutra (January 17, 1901 – May 5, 1983) was an American professional golfer who played on the PGA Tour in the 1920s and 1930s. He won two major titles, the PGA Championship in 1932 and the U.S. Open in 1934, and was the first major champion born in the western United States.

== Early life ==
Born in Monterey, California, Dutra was a descendant of early Spanish settlers in California. At age nine, he and his older brother Mortimer were introduced to golf as a caddies at the country club in Del Monte, where the club professional was Macdonald Smith. For years, they woke up very early to practice golf before going to work. Early in his career, Dutra worked at a hardware store for five years.

== Professional career ==
In 1923, Dutra resigned from a job at his father's hardware store to become a golf professional. His best years as a golf professional were in the early 1930s, when he won his two majors and played on the 1933 and 1935 Ryder Cup teams. In the 1932 PGA Championship in St. Paul, Dutra played 196 holes and finished an astounding 19-under-par. He was the medalist in the 36-hole qualifier and won his five matches by comfortable margins (9 & 8, 5 & 3, 5 & 4, 3 & 2, and 4 & 3).

Dutra is best remembered for his performance at the 1934 U.S. Open at Merion near Philadelphia. More than a year earlier, Dutra became afflicted with amoebic dysentery, an often uncomfortable and painful intestinal infection. While traveling east from Los Angeles, Dutra stopped in the Detroit area to meet up with his brother Mortie, as both were entered in the Open, and began to feel very ill. He spent a short time in the hospital, casting doubt whether he could even play in the tournament. He resorted to unusual measures to cope with the infection, and lost close to 20 pounds (9 kg) off his 6 ft 3 in (1.91 m), 230-pound (104 kg) frame. After the first two rounds, Dutra was eight strokes behind the leaders and in 18th place. On the eve of the 36-hole final day, he had an attack of dysentery, forcing him to snack on sugar cubes throughout the day. He was still able to shoot a 71-72, and held off 54-hole leader Gene Sarazen to win by a single stroke. (Mortie Dutra finished tied for 28th.)

Dutra began his career as a club pro in Fresno, California at Fort Washington Country Club for several years and then was at Sunnyside Country Club for a year. He won his two majors as the pro at Brentwood Country Club in Los Angeles, and moved over to Wilshire Country Club in 1935. While at Brentwood in 1932, he gave Babe Didrickson a two-minute lesson before she played her "first" round of golf, shortly after the 1932 Olympics; her first tee shot was 240 yards (220 m), outdriving her male playing partners. (It was later revealed she had previous golf experience.) Dutra later worked in Mexico City, then back in California in Avila Beach and Watsonville.

== Death ==
Dutra died after an extended illness at age 82 in Newman in Stanislaus County. He and his wife Gladys are buried in the Hills Ferry Cemetery in Newman.

== Awards and honors ==
In 1966, Dutra was inducted into the Fresno County Athletic Hall of Fame

== Professional wins (20) ==
=== PGA Tour wins (10) ===
- 1929 (1) National Orange Open
- 1930 (2) Long Beach Open (tie with Joe Kirkwood, Sr.), Southern California Pro
- 1932 (3) Metropolitan Open, North Shore Chicago Open, PGA Championship
- 1934 (2) U.S. Open, Miami Biltmore Open
- 1936 (2) Sunset Fields Open, True Temper Open

=== Other wins (10) ===
- 1922 Del Monte Match Play
- 1930 Southern California PGA Championship
- 1931 Southern California PGA Championship, California State Match Play, Pacific Southwest PGA
- 1932 Southern California PGA Championship
- 1933 Southern California PGA Championship
- 1938 Southern California PGA Championship
- 1940 Southern California PGA Championship, California State Open

== Major championships ==
=== Wins (2) ===
Year	Championship	54 holes	Winning score	Margin	Runner-up
1932	PGA Championship	n/a	4 & 3		(United States) Frank Walsh
1934	U.S. Open	3 shot deficit	+13 (76-74-72-71=293)	1 stroke	(United States) Gene Sarazen

The PGA Championship was match play until 1958.

=== Results timeline ===
Tournament	1928	1929
U.S. Open		
The Open Championship		
PGA Championship	R32	

Tournament	1930	1931	1932	1933	1934	1935	1936	1937	1938	1939
Masters Tournament	NYF	NYF	NYF	NYF		3				
U.S. Open	T25	T21	T7	T7	1	T12	T45	T55	T16	T16
The Open Championship				6						
PGA Championship			1	R16	DNQ			R32		

Tournament	1940	1941	1942	1943	1944	1945	1946	1947	1948	1949
Masters Tournament				NT	NT	NT				
U.S. Open	CUT	WD	NT	NT	NT	NT			CUT	
The Open Championship	NT	NT	NT	NT	NT	NT				
PGA Championship				NT						

Tournament	1950	1951	1952	1953
Masters Tournament				63
U.S. Open				
The Open Championship				
PGA Championship				

Win
Top 10
Did not play

NYF = tournament not yet founded
NT = no tournament
WD = withdrew
DNQ = did not qualify for match play portion
CUT = missed the half-way cut
R64, R32, R16, QF, SF = round in which player lost in PGA Championship match play
"T" indicates a tie for a place

=== Summary ===
Tournament	Wins	2nd	3rd	Top-5	Top-10	Top-25	Events	Cuts made
Masters Tournament	0	0	1	1	1	1	2	2
U.S. Open	1	0	0	1	3	7	12	10
The Open Championship	0	0	0	0	1	1	1	1
PGA Championship	1	0	0	1	2	4	5	4
Totals	2	0	1	3	7	13	20	17
