= Jim Simons (golfer) =

American professional golfer (1950–2005)

Personal information
- Full name: James Bradley Simons
- Nationality: United States
- Born: May 15, 1950 Pittsburgh, Pennsylvania, U.S.
- Died: December 8, 2005 (aged 55) Jacksonville, Florida, U.S.
- Height: 5 ft 10 in (1.78 m)
- Weight: 175 lb (79 kg; 12.5 st)

Career
- Sport: Golf
- Turned professional: 1972
- Former tour: PGA Tour
- Professional wins: 3

Number of wins by tour
- PGA Tour: 3

Best results in major championships
- Masters Tournament: T15: 1981, 1982
- PGA Championship: T5: 1982
- U.S. Open: T5: 1971
- The Open Championship: DNP

James Bradley Simons (May 15, 1950 – December 8, 2005) was an American professional golfer who played on the PGA Tour in the 1970s and 1980s.

== Early life ==
Simons was born in Pittsburgh and raised in suburban Butler, Pennsylvania. He attended Knoch High School in Saxonburg, Pennsylvania.

Simons qualified for the 1967 U.S. Open at Baltusrol, played just after his junior year in high school. At age 17, he shot 165 (+25) and missed the 36-hole cut by seventeen strokes.

== Amateur career ==
Simons was a two-time All-American on the Wake Forest University golf team. He finished T-2 at the 1970 Canadian Amateur and finished runner-up at the 1971 British Amateur to Steve Melnyk.

Simons is probably best remembered for nearly winning the 1971 U.S. Open as an amateur. At the age of 21, he shot a third-round 65 to take a two-shot lead after 54 holes at Merion Golf Club near Philadelphia. A stroke out of the lead on the final hole, his tee shot found the rough and he double bogeyed. Simons carded a 76 to finish tied for fifth, three shots out of a playoff.

== Professional career ==
Simons won three PGA Tour events during his career and had over three dozen top-10 finishes; his final win came at Pebble Beach in early 1982. His best finish in a major championship in the professional ranks was later that year, a tie for fifth in the PGA Championship. He was the first player to win a televised PGA Tour event using a metal driver. Simons also notably worked as an investment executive while golfing professionally.

Simons played a handful of events on the Champions Tour after turning 50 in 2000.

== Death ==
Simons was found dead in the hot tub in his Jacksonville, Florida home at the age of 55. The Jacksonville/Duval County medical examiner's office ruled the cause of death as accidental "multiple drug toxicity".

== Awards and honors ==
In 1996, Simons was inducted into the Wake Forest University Athletics Hall of Fame.

== Amateur wins ==
- 1966 West Penn Junior Championship
- 1969 West Penn Amateur, Pennsylvania Amateur, Western Junior
- 1970 Pennsylvania Amateur

== Professional wins (3) ==
=== PGA Tour wins (3) ===
| No. | Date | Tournament | Winning score | To par | Margin of victory | Runner-up |
|---|---|---|---|---|---|---|
| 1 | Apr 24, 1977 | First NBC New Orleans Open | 70-69-67-67=273 | −15 | 3 strokes | (United States) Stan Lee |
| 2 | May 21, 1978 | Memorial Tournament | 68-69-73-74=284 | −4 | 1 stroke | (United States) Billy Kratzert |
| 3 | Feb 7, 1982 | Bing Crosby National Pro-Am | 71-66-71-66=274 | −14 | 2 strokes | (United States) Craig Stadler |

PGA Tour playoff record (0–3)

| No. | Year | Tournament | Opponent | Result |
|---|---|---|---|---|
| 1 | 1979 | Buick-Goodwrench Open | (United States) John Fought | Lost to par on second extra hole |
| 2 | 1980 | Sammy Davis Jr.-Greater Hartford Open | (United States) Howard Twitty | Lost to birdie on sixth extra hole |
| 3 | 1984 | Bob Hope Desert Classic | (United States) John Mahaffey | Lost to par on second extra hole |

== Results in major championships ==
| Tournament | 1967 | 1968 | 1969 |
|---|---|---|---|
| Masters Tournament | | | |
| U.S. Open | CUT | 63 | |
| PGA Championship | | | |

| Tournament | 1970 | 1971 | 1972 | 1973 | 1974 | 1975 | 1976 | 1977 | 1978 | 1979 |
|---|---|---|---|---|---|---|---|---|---|---|
| Masters Tournament | | CUT | T41 | CUT | | | | | CUT | T23 |
| U.S. Open | | T5_{LA} | T15_{LA} | CUT | T62 | | CUT | T35 | | T16 |
| PGA Championship | | | | | | | T60 | T25 | | T46 |

| Tournament | 1980 | 1981 | 1982 | 1983 | 1984 |
|---|---|---|---|---|---|
| Masters Tournament | T19 | T15 | T15 | CUT | |
| U.S. Open | T22 | T58 | CUT | | |
| PGA Championship | CUT | CUT | T5 | T30 | CUT |

Note: Simons never played in The Open Championship.

Top 10
Did not play

_{LA} = Low amateur
CUT = missed the half-way cut
"T" indicates a tie for a place

== U.S. national team appearances ==
Amateur

- Walker Cup: 1971

== See also ==
- 1972 PGA Tour Qualifying School graduates
