= Gene Sarazen =

American professional golfer (1902–1999)

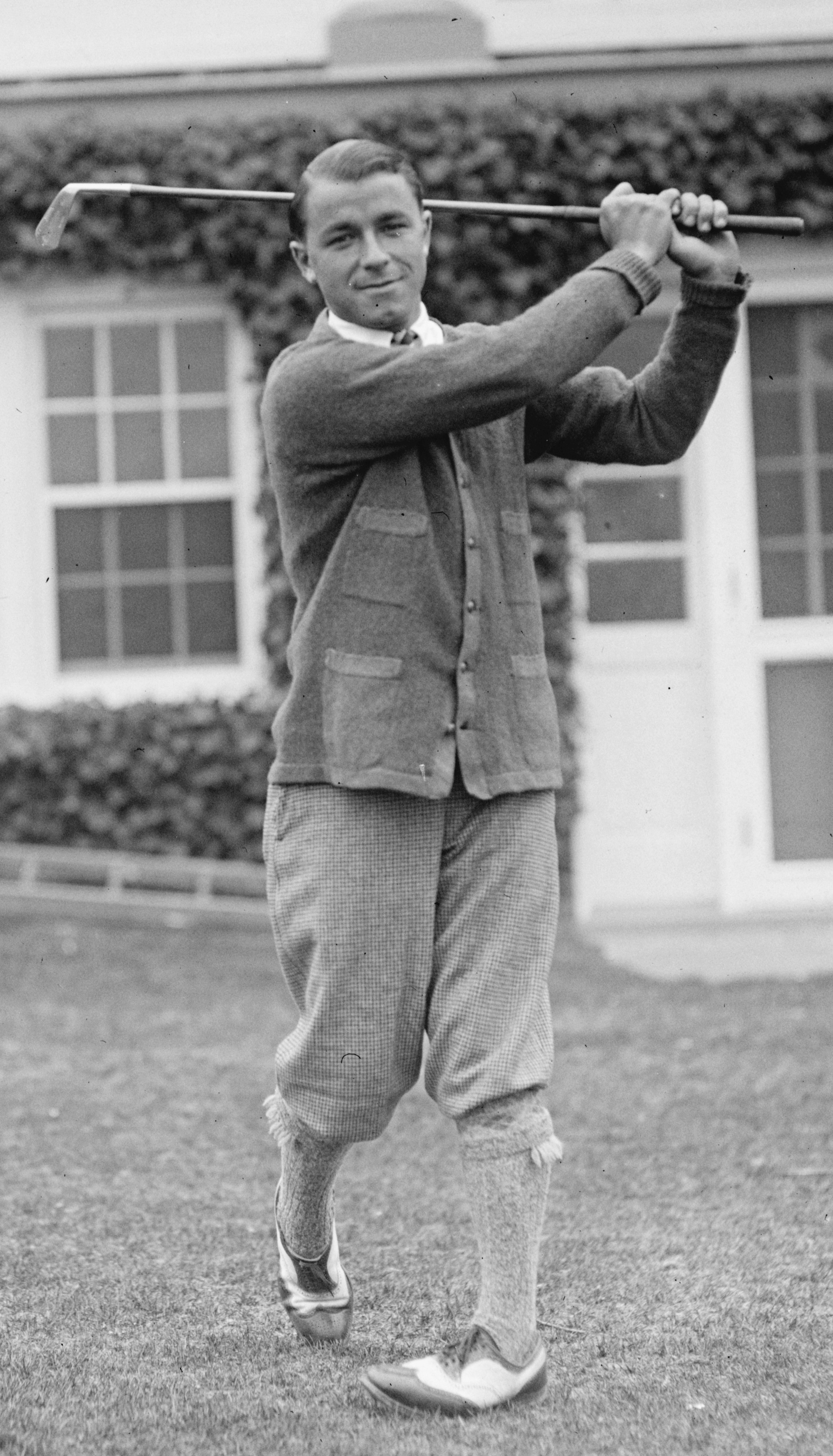
- Sarazen in 1922

Personal information
- Full name: Eugenio Saraceni
- Nickname: The Squire
- Nationality: United States
- Born: February 27, 1902 Harrison, New York, U.S.
- Died: May 13, 1999 (aged 97) Naples, Florida, U.S.
- Height: 5 ft 5 1/2 in (166 cm)
- Weight: 162 lb (73 kg; 11.6 st)
- Spouses: Mary Sarazen (m. 1924–86, her death)
- Children: 2

Career
- Sport: Golf
- Turned professional: 1920
- Former tour: PGA Tour
- Professional wins: 48

Number of wins by tour
- PGA Tour: 38
- Other: 10

Best results in major championships (wins: 7)
- Masters Tournament: Won: 1935
- PGA Championship: Won: 1922, 1923, 1933
- U.S. Open: Won: 1922, 1932
- The Open Championship: Won: 1932

Achievements and awards
- World Golf Hall of Fame: 1974 (member page)
- PGA Tour Lifetime Achievement Award: 1996
- Bob Jones Award: 1992
- Associated Press Male Athlete of the Year: 1932

Gene Sarazen (/ˈsɑːrəzɛn/; born Eugenio Saraceni, February 27, 1902 – May 13, 1999) was an American professional golfer, one of the world's top players in the 1920s and 1930s, and the winner of seven major championships. He was the first of six players (along with Ben Hogan, Gary Player, Jack Nicklaus, Tiger Woods, and Rory McIlroy) to win each of the four majors at least once, known as the Career Grand Slam: U.S. Open (1922, 1932), PGA Championship (1922, 1923, 1933), Open Championship (1932), and Masters (1935).

== Early life ==
Eugenio Saraceni was born on February 27, 1902, in Harrison, New York. He was an Italian American as his parents were poor Sicilian immigrants. He began caddying at age ten at local golf clubs, took up golf himself, and gradually developed his skills; Sarazen was essentially self-taught. Somewhat novel at the time, he used the interlocking grip to hold the club.

== Amateur career ==
He earned his spot in his first U.S. Open in 1920 at age 18.

== Professional career ==
Sarazen took a series of club professional jobs in the New York area from his mid-teens. In 1921, he became a professional at Titusville (Pa.) Country Club, and he contracted to be the professional at Highland Country Club near Pittsburgh in 1922. Sarazen arrived in April, stocked the golf shop and gave a few lessons, but spent most of his time at Oakmont Country Club practicing with Emil Loeffler. At some point, the pair visited Skokie Country Club to practice on the course that would hold the U.S. Open; in July, he came from four shots behind to win the tournament. He returned to Pittsburgh and was feted at the William Penn Hotel, where he burst from a paper mâché golf ball. He did not return to Highland CC, broke his contract and became a "touring" golf professional. Later that summer, he won the PGA Championship at Oakmont.

Sarazen was a contemporary and rival of amateur Bobby Jones, who was born in the same year; he also had many battles with Walter Hagen, who was nine years older. Sarazen, Jones, and Hagen were the world's dominant players during the 1920s. Rivalries among the three great champions significantly expanded interest in golf around the world during this period, and made the United States the world's dominant golf power for the first time, taking over this position from Great Britain.

The winner of 38 PGA tour events, he played on six U.S. Ryder Cup teams: 1927, 1929, 1931, 1933, 1935, and 1937.

=== Invents modern sand wedge ===
Sarazen claimed to have invented the modern sand wedge, and debuted the club (while keeping it secret during preliminary practice rounds) at The Open Championship at Prince's Golf Club in 1932 (which he won). He called it the sand iron. The original club he used is no longer on display at Prince's as it is worth too much for the insurers to cover. However, a similar club was patented in 1928 by Edwin Kerr McClain, and it is possible Sarazen saw this club.

Sarazen had previously struggled with his sand play and there had been earlier sand-specific clubs. But Bobby Jones's sand club, for example, had a concave face, which actually contacted the ball twice during a swing; this design was later banned. Sarazen's innovation was to weld solder onto the lower back of the club, building up the flange so that it sat lower than the leading edge when soled. The flange, not the leading edge, would contact the sand first, and explode sand as the shot was played. The additional weight provided punch to power through the thick sand. Sarazen's newly developed technique with the new club was to contact the sand a couple of inches behind the ball, not actually contacting the ball at all on most sand shots.

Every top-class golfer since has utilized this wedge design and technique, and the same club design and method are also used by amateur players around the world. The sand wedge also began to be used by top players for shots from grass, shortly after Sarazen introduced it, and this led to a revolution in short-game techniques, along with lower scoring by players who mastered the skills.

=== Masters Tournament win ===
Sarazen hit "the shot heard 'round the world" at Augusta National Golf Club on the fifteenth hole in the final round of the Masters Tournament in 1935. He struck a spoon (the loft of the modern four wood) 232 yards (212 m) into the hole, scoring a double eagle. At the time he was trailing Craig Wood by three shots, and was then tied with him. He parred the 16th, 17th and 18th holes to preserve the tie. The following day, the pair played a 36-hole playoff, with Sarazen winning by five shots.

The Sarazen Bridge, approaching the left side of the 15th green, was named in 1955 to commemorate the double eagle's twentieth anniversary, which included a contest to duplicate, with the closest just over 4 feet (1.2 m) away. It remains one of the most famous golf shots in golf history.

=== Later years, legacy ===
In spite of his height of 5 ft 5 1/2 in (1.66 m), Sarazen was one of the longest hitters of his era. He played several lengthy exhibition tours around the world, promoting his skills and the sport of golf, and earned a very good living from golf. One of his American tours in 1940 was sponsored by Golf Magazine and he played a match every day for 60 days. As a multiple past champion, he was eligible to continue competing after his best years were past, and occasionally did so in the top events, well into the 1960s, and occasionally into the 1970s. Throughout his life, Sarazen competed wearing knickers or plus-fours, which were the fashion when he broke into the top level.

For many years after his retirement, Sarazen was a familiar figure as an honorary starter at the Masters. From 1981 to 1999, he joined Byron Nelson and Sam Snead in hitting a ceremonial tee shot before each Masters tournament. He also popularized the sport with his role as a commentator on the Wonderful World of Golf television show, and was an early TV broadcaster at important events.

At age 71, Sarazen made a hole-in-one at The Open Championship in 1973, at the "Postage Stamp" at Troon in Scotland. In 1992, he was voted the Bob Jones Award, the highest honor given by the United States Golf Association in recognition of distinguished sportsmanship in golf. Sarazen had what is still the longest-running endorsement contract in professional sports – with Wilson Sporting Goods from 1923 until his death, a total of 75 years.

In 1998, shortly before his death, the Sarazen Student Union at Siena College was named in his honor. He also established an endowed scholarship fund at the college, The Gene and Mary Sarazen Scholarship, which is awarded annually to students reflecting the high personal, athletic, and intellectual ideals of Dr. Sarazen. For many years, kitted in his signature plus-fours, he hit the first ball in an annual golf tournament, held to raise funds for the scholarship.

== Personal life and death ==
Sarazen died at age 97 in 1999 of complications from pneumonia in Naples, Florida. His wife Mary died 13 years earlier in 1986 with both interred at Marco Island Cemetery in Marco.

== Honors and awards ==
- In 1932, he was the Associated Press Male Athlete of the Year
- In 1962, he was inducted into the Connecticut Golf Hall of Fame
- In 1974, he was inducted into the World Golf Hall of Fame
- In 1978, he received an honorary degree from Siena College
- In 1996, he earned the PGA Tour's first Lifetime Achievement Award
- In 2000, he was ranked as the 11th greatest golfer of all time by Golf Digest magazine
- In 2018, T. J. Auclair ranked Sarazen as the ninth greatest golfer of all time

== Professional wins (48) ==
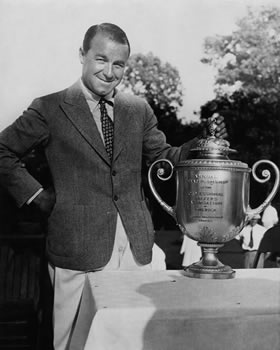
Sarazen with the PGA Championship trophy in 1939

=== PGA Tour wins (38) ===
- 1922 (3) Southern (Spring) Open, **U.S. Open**, **PGA Championship**
- 1923 (1) **PGA Championship**
- 1925 (1) Metropolitan Open
- 1926 (1) Miami Open
- 1927 (3) Long Island Open, Miami Beach Open, Metropolitan PGA
- 1928 (4) Miami Beach Open, Miami Open, Nassau Bahamas Open, Metropolitan PGA
- 1929 (2) Miami Open, Miami Beach Open
- 1930 (8) Miami Open, Agua Caliente Open, Florida West Coast Open, Concord Country Club Open, United States Pro Invitational, Western Open, Lannin Memorial Tournament, Middle Atlantic Open
- 1931 (3) Florida West Coast Open, La Gorce Open, Lannin Memorial Tournament
- 1932 (4) True Temper Open, Coral Gables Open, **U.S. Open**, **The Open Championship**
- 1933 (1) **PGA Championship**
- 1935 (3) **Masters Tournament**, Massachusetts Open, Long Island Open
- 1937 (2) Florida West Coast Open, Chicago Open
- 1938 (1) Lake Placid Open
- 1941 (1) Miami Biltmore International Four-Ball (with Ben Hogan)

Major championships are shown in bold.

=== Other wins (7) ===
this list may be incomplete

- 1923 Daily Dispatch Northern Professional Championship
- 1928 Miami International Four-Ball (with Johnny Farrell)
- 1936 Australian Open
- 1939 Metropolitan PGA
- 1945 Shoreline Open
- 1948 Shoreline Open
- 1966 Northeast New York PGA Championship

=== Senior wins (3) ===
- 1954 PGA Seniors' Championship, World Senior Championship
- 1958 PGA Seniors' Championship

== Major championships ==
=== Wins (7) ===
| Year | Championship | 54 holes | Winning score | Margin | Runner(s)-up |
|---|---|---|---|---|---|
| 1922 | U.S. Open | 4 shot deficit | +8 (72-73-75-68=288) | 1 stroke | (United States) Bobby Jones |
| 1922 | PGA Championship | n/a | 4 & 3 | | (United States) Emmet French |
| 1923 | PGA Championship (2) | n/a | 38 holes | | (United States) Walter Hagen |
| 1932 | U.S. Open (2) | 1 shot deficit | +6 (74-76-70-66=286) | 3 strokes | (Scotland) Bobby Cruickshank, (England) Philip Perkins |
| 1932 | The Open Championship | 4 shot lead | −5 (70-69-70-74=283) | 5 strokes | (United States) Macdonald Smith |
| 1933 | PGA Championship (3) | n/a | 5 & 4 | | (United States) Willie Goggin |
| 1935 | Masters Tournament | 3 shot deficit | −6 (68-71-73-70=282) | Playoff ^{1} | (United States) Craig Wood |

Note: The PGA Championship was match play until 1958
^{1} Defeated Craig Wood in a 36-hole playoff - Sarazen 144 (Even), Wood 149 (+5)

=== Results timeline ===
| Tournament | 1920 | 1921 | 1922 | 1923 | 1924 | 1925 | 1926 | 1927 | 1928 | 1929 |
|---|---|---|---|---|---|---|---|---|---|---|
| U.S. Open | T30 | 17 | 1 | T16 | T17 | T5 | T3 | 3 | T6 | T3 |
| The Open Championship | | | | | T41 | | | | 2 | T8 |
| PGA Championship | | QF | 1 | 1 | R16 | R32 | R16 | QF | SF | QF |

| Tournament | 1930 | 1931 | 1932 | 1933 | 1934 | 1935 | 1936 | 1937 | 1938 | 1939 |
|---|---|---|---|---|---|---|---|---|---|---|
| Masters Tournament | NYF | NYF | NYF | NYF | | 1 | 3 | T24 | T13 | 5 |
| U.S. Open | T28 | T4 | 1 | T26 | 2 | T6 | T28 | T10 | 10 | T47 |
| The Open Championship | | T3 | 1 | T3 | T21 | | T5 | CUT | | |
| PGA Championship | 2 | SF | DNQ | 1 | R16 | R32 | R64 | R32 | QF | R64 |

| Tournament | 1940 | 1941 | 1942 | 1943 | 1944 | 1945 | 1946 | 1947 | 1948 | 1949 |
|---|---|---|---|---|---|---|---|---|---|---|
| Masters Tournament | T21 | T19 | T28 | NT | NT | NT | | T26 | T23 | T39 |
| U.S. Open | 2 | T7 | NT | NT | NT | NT | CUT | T39 | CUT | CUT |
| The Open Championship | NT | NT | NT | NT | NT | NT | | | | |
| PGA Championship | QF | SF | | NT | | R64 | | R16 | R16 | R32 |

| Tournament | 1950 | 1951 | 1952 | 1953 | 1954 | 1955 | 1956 | 1957 | 1958 | 1959 |
|---|---|---|---|---|---|---|---|---|---|---|
| Masters Tournament | T10 | T12 | WD | T38 | T53 | WD | T49 | CUT | CUT | CUT |
| U.S. Open | T38 | T35 | T33 | CUT | WD | | | CUT | CUT | |
| The Open Championship | | | T17 | | T17 | | WD | | T16 | |
| PGA Championship | | R64 | | | | R64 | R16 | | CUT | WD |

| Tournament | 1960 | 1961 | 1962 | 1963 | 1964 | 1965 | 1966 | 1967 | 1968 | 1969 |
|---|---|---|---|---|---|---|---|---|---|---|
| Masters Tournament | CUT | CUT | WD | 49 | WD | CUT | CUT | WD | | CUT |
| U.S. Open | | | | | | | | | | |
| The Open Championship | WD | | | | | | | | | |
| PGA Championship | | | | | | | | | | |

| Tournament | 1970 | 1971 | 1972 | 1973 | 1974 | 1975 | 1976 |
|---|---|---|---|---|---|---|---|
| Masters Tournament | CUT | CUT | CUT | CUT | | | |
| U.S. Open | | | | | | | |
| The Open Championship | CUT | | | CUT | | | WD |
| PGA Championship | | CUT | WD | | | | |

Win
Top 10
Did not play

NYF = tournament not yet founded
NT = no tournament
WD = withdrew
DNQ = did not qualify for match play portion
CUT = missed the half-way cut
R64, R32, R16, QF, SF = round in which player lost in PGA Championship match play
"T" indicates a tie for a place

=== Summary ===
| Tournament | Wins | 2nd | 3rd | Top-5 | Top-10 | Top-25 | Events | Cuts made |
|---|---|---|---|---|---|---|---|---|
| Masters Tournament | 1 | 0 | 1 | 3 | 4 | 10 | 34 | 17 |
| U.S. Open | 2 | 2 | 3 | 9 | 14 | 17 | 33 | 26 |
| The Open Championship | 1 | 1 | 2 | 5 | 6 | 10 | 17 | 11 |
| PGA Championship | 3 | 1 | 3 | 12 | 18 | 22 | 31 | 27 |
| Totals | 7 | 4 | 9 | 29 | 42 | 59 | 115 | 81 |

- Most consecutive cuts made – 44 (1920 U.S. Open – 1937 U.S. Open)
- Longest streak of top-10s – 7 (1927 PGA – 1929 PGA)

== See also ==
- Career Grand Slam Champions
- List of golfers with most PGA Tour wins
- List of men's major championships winning golfers
- Most PGA Tour wins in a year
- Sarazen World Open
