= Colonial Country Club (Fort Worth) =

Private golf club in Fort Worth, Texas

- Location within the United States Location within Texas
- 32.717°N 97.373°W

Club information
- Location: Fort Worth, Texas, U.S.
- Elevation: 600 feet (185 m)
- Established: 1936; 90 years ago
- Type: Private
- Total holes: 18
- Tournaments: Colonial National Invitation (1946-present); 1941 U.S. Open; 1975 Tournament Players Championship; 1991 U.S. Women's Open
- Greens: Bentgrass
- Fairways: Bermuda grass
- Website: colonialfw.com
- Designed by: John Bredemus & Perry Maxwell
- Par: 70
- Length: 7,289 yards (6,665 m)
- Course rating: 75.1
- Slope rating: 138
- Course record: 61 - seven PGA Tour pros

Colonial Country Club is a private golf club in the southern United States, located in Fort Worth, Texas. The club has hosted an annual PGA Tour event, the Colonial National Invitation, since 1946; it is the longest running non-major tour event to be held at the same venue. The golf course is located on the south bank of the Clear Fork of the Trinity River, just northwest of the campus of Texas Christian University.

== History ==
Colonial Country Club was started 90 years ago in 1936 by Marvin Leonard, who had a keen interest in bringing bentgrass greens to his hometown of Fort Worth. When his initial plans to install bentgrass greens at an already existing Fort Worth golf club failed, Leonard came up with his vision for Colonial Golf Club. His vision became a reality in January 1936 when the club opened with approximately 100 members.

In the late 1930s, Leonard began talks with the United States Golf Association (USGA) to conduct the U.S. Open at Colonial. After guaranteeing the USGA $25,000, Colonial was granted the rights to the 1941 edition, won by Craig Wood, the winner of that year's Masters.

In 1942, Leonard decided to sell the club to the members of Colonial. His first attempt to sell to the members was rejected, but he eventually sold the club to the members on December 31, 1942, when it took its current name, Colonial Country Club.

== The course ==
The golf course at Colonial Country Club was designed by John Bredemus of Texas and Perry Maxwell of Oklahoma. The par-70 course, currently at 7,209 yards (6,592 m), is bordered on the northern edge by the Trinity River (Clear Fork) with the rest of the course surrounded by the neighboring residential area. The course length in 1941 was 7,035 yards (6,433 m), considerably long for the era.

In addition to the annual PGA Tour event, the course has hosted three major or significant professional golf events: the 1941 U.S. Open, the 1975 Tournament Players Championship (won by Al Geiberger), and the 1991 U.S. Women's Open (won by Meg Mallon).

=== Course layout ===
Charles Schwab Challenge at Colonial in 2026

Hole	1	2	3	4	5	6	7	8	9	Out	10	11	12	13	14	15	16	17	18	In	Total
Yards	581	385	475	248	476	410	480	194	413	3,662	407	639	457	199	456	431	197	399	442	3,627	7,289
Par	5	4	4	3	4	4	4	3	4	35	4	5	4	3	4	4	3	4	4	35	70

The course has the following ratings and slopes:

- Black: 75.1 / 138
- Blue: 73.5 / 134
- Gold: 72.0 / 131
- White: 69.7 / 127
- Women's: 74.8 / 137

=== Course record ===
The course record is 61, co-held by seven PGA Tour pros: Keith Clearwater, Lee Janzen, Greg Kraft, Justin Leonard, Kevin Na, Kenny Perry, and Chad Campbell.

== Colonial Tournament ==
The Colonial golf tournament has been held every year since 1946, with exceptions in 1949 (flooding of the Trinity River) and 1975, when the club hosted the second Tournament Players Championship in August.

The most noteworthy winner of the tournament is Ben Hogan; the late Fort Worth resident won five times, which earned the course the nickname "Hogan's Alley." Other notable winners include Sam Snead, Arnold Palmer, Billy Casper (twice), Lee Trevino (twice), Ben Crenshaw (twice), Al Geiberger, Bruce Lietzke (twice), Jack Nicklaus, Peter Jacobsen, Lanny Wadkins, Ian Baker-Finch, Tom Lehman, Corey Pavin (twice), Tom Watson, Phil Mickelson (twice), Sergio García, Nick Price (twice), Kenny Perry (twice), Zach Johnson (twice), and Jordan Spieth.

The current tournament record is 259, set by Zach Johnson in 2010. Kenny Perry holds the 54-hole record of 192 which he shot in 2005. In 2011, David Toms set the 36-hole record with a 124. The 18-hole record of 61 is held by 6 players. The front nine and back nine records are both 28, held by Wayne Levi and Keith Clearwater, respectively.

From 2007 through 2015, the tournament was sponsored by Crowne Plaza Hotels and Resorts and called the "Crowne Plaza Invitational at Colonial." Previous title sponsors include Southwestern Bell, MasterCard, and Bank of America. It became the "Dean & DeLuca Invitational" in 2016; Dean & DeLuca is a chain of upscale grocery stores headquartered in Wichita, Kansas. It became the "Fort Worth Invitational" in 2018.

The 2018 tournament, renamed the Fort Worth Invitational, was held through the support of four local corporate supporters that stepped in to provide financial support after Dean & DeLuca suddenly pulled-out of a six-year sponsorship agreement. American Airlines, AT&T, XTO Energy Inc. and Burlington Northern Santa Fe Railway agreed to fund the 2018 tournament to allow time for the PGA Tour and Colonial Country Club to find a new sponsor.

Charles Schwab & Co., a major sponsor on the PGA Tour and PGA Champions Tour, expanded its golf presence in 2019 by assuming title sponsorship of the PGA Tour’s Fort Worth Invitational at Colonial Country Club, known henceforth as The Charles Schwab Challenge. The four-year agreement, from 2019-2022, was announced April 23, 2018 by representatives from Charles Schwab, the PGA Tour and Colonial Country Club, who were joined by defending champion Kevin Kisner.

== Trivia ==
- The fifth hole of the course (which has the Trinity River running alongside the right for nearly the entire length) is often mentioned as one of the best holes in America, and is regularly ranked as among the most difficult in the annual survey performed by the Dallas Morning News (which appears in early spring in a special golf section). It also ends the nicknamed "Horrible Horseshoe," a very tough three-hole stretch.
- The course is ranked 73 on Golf Digest's list of the 100 greatest golf courses in America.
- In 2003, Annika Sörenstam became the first woman to play in PGA Tour event since 1946, when Babe Didrikson Zaharias played in the Los Angeles Open.
- Part of Bud Shrake's 2001 novel, Billy Boy, was set at Colonial.
