= 1975 Tournament Players Championship =

Tournament information
- Dates: August 21–24, 1975
- Location: Fort Worth, Texas, U.S. 32.717°N 97.373°W
- Course: Colonial Country Club
- Tour: PGA Tour

Statistics
- Par: 70
- Length: 7,190 yards (6,575 m)
- Cut: 147 (+7)
- Prize fund: $250,000
- Winner's share: $50,000

Champion
- (United States) Al Geiberger
- 270 (−10)

Location map
- Location in the United States Location in Texas

The 1975 Tournament Players Championship was a golf tournament in Texas on the PGA Tour, held August 21–24 at Colonial Country Club in Fort Worth. This was the second Tournament Players Championship; Al Geiberger led wire-to-wire and finished three strokes ahead of runner-up Dave Stockton. Defending champion Jack Nicklaus opened with 67 but finished seventeen strokes behind, tied for eighteenth.

As the first three versions of the Tournament Players Championship were established PGA Tour events with increased prize money and qualifications, Colonial Country Club recognises this tournament as also the 29th playing of the Colonial National Invitational. The first two Tournament Players Championships were played in late summer; this edition was two weeks after the PGA Championship at Firestone, won by Nicklaus. The next TPC was held just six months later, in south Florida in late February, before the majors.

== Venue ==
This was the only Tournament Players Championship held in Texas; the first was in Georgia in 1974 and it relocated to Florida in 1976. Colonial Country Club has hosted an annual event on the PGA Tour since 1946 and was the site of the U.S. Open in 1941.

== Round summaries ==
=== First round ===
Thursday, August 21, 1975

Place	Player	Score	To par
1	(United States) Al Geiberger	66	−4
T2	(United States) Bob Dickson	67	−3
T2	(United States) Hale Irwin	67	−3
T2	(United States) Jack Nicklaus	67	−3
T5	(United States) Bud Allin	68	−2
T5	(United States) Jim Wiechers	68	−2
T5	(United States) Mike Wynn	68	−2
T8	(United States) John Mahaffey	69	−1
T8	(United States) Andy North	69	−1
T8	(United States) Bill Rogers	69	−1
T8	(United States) Mason Rudolph	69	−1
T8	(United States) John Schlee	69	−1
T8	(United States) Larry Ziegler	69	−1

=== Second round ===
Friday, August 22, 1975
Saturday, August 23, 1975

Place	Player	Score	To par
1	(United States) Al Geiberger	66-68=134	−6
T2	(United States) Bob Dickson	67-69=136	−4
T2	(United States) Hubert Green	71-65=136	−4
T2	(United States) Dave Stockton	72-64=136	−4
5	(United States) John Schlee	69-68=137	−3
T6	(United States) Hale Irwin	67-72=139	+1
T6	(United States) Bill Rogers	69-70=139	+1
T6	(United States) Mason Rudolph	69-70=139	+1
T9	(United States) Randy Erskine	71-69=140	E
T9	(United States) Larry Ziegler	69-71=140	E

=== Third round ===
Saturday, August 23, 1975

Place	Player	Score	To par
1	(United States) Al Geiberger	66-68-67=201	−9
2	(United States) Dave Stockton	72-64-68=204	−6
3	(United States) Hubert Green	71-65-70=206	−4
4	(United States) Bob Dickson	67-69-72=208	−2
T5	(United States) Charles Coody	73-70-68=211	+1
T5	(United States) Hale Irwin	67-72-72=211	+1
T5	(United States) Mason Rudolph	69-70-72=211	+1
T8	(United States) Bud Allin	72-72-68=212	+2
T8	(United States) Jack Nicklaus	67-75-70=212	+2
T8	(United States) Joe Porter	72-72-68=212	+2

=== Final round ===
Sunday, August 24, 1975

Place	Player	Score	To par	Money ($)
1	(United States) Al Geiberger	66-68-67-69=270	−10	50,000
2	(United States) Dave Stockton	72-64-68-69=273	−7	28,500
3	(United States) Hubert Green	71-65-70-69=275	−5	17,750
T4	(United States) Bob Murphy	73-69-71-68=281	+1	10,333
T4	(United States) Bob Dickson	67-69-72-73=281	+1	10,333
T4	(United States) Mason Rudolph	69-70-72-70=281	+1	10,333
7	(United States) Hale Irwin	67-72-72-72=283	+3	8,000
T8	(United States) Joe Porter	72-72-68-72=284	+4	6,792
T8	(United States) Tom Watson	73-69-75-67=284	+4	6,792
T8	(United States) Bobby Wadkins	76-69-68-71=284	+4	6,792
