= Canterbury Golf Club =

Private golf and country club in Ohio, US

Coordinates: 41°28′11″N 81°31′22″W

- Interactive map of Canterbury Golf Club

Club information
- Location: Beachwood, Ohio, U.S.
- Established: 1921
- Type: Private
- Total holes: 18
- Tournaments: U.S. Open (1940, 1946); PGA Championship (1973) Senior Tournament Players Championship (1983–1986) U.S. Senior Open (1996); Senior PGA Championship (2009); U.S. Amateur (1964, 1979); DAP Championship (2016–2018)
- Website: Canterbury Golf Club
- Designed by: Herbert Strong
- Par: 70 (championship tees)
- Length: 7,012 yards (6,412 m)
- Course rating: 74.3
- Slope rating: 139

Canterbury Golf Club is a private golf and country club located in the Cleveland suburb of Beachwood, Ohio, US. The club was formerly the home of the DAP Championship, part of the Web.com Tour Finals.

A member club of the USGA, Canterbury has been recognized by Golf Digest as one of the top 100 courses in the United States. The club has hosted the U.S. Open and the PGA Championship, as well as the U.S. Senior Open, the Senior PGA Championship, and the U.S. Amateur.

== History ==
Following its establishment on February 2, 1921, by a contingent of Cleveland's University Club, the club purchased a 146-acre (0.59 km^{2}) site in a sparsely developed suburban area located approximately 10 miles (16 km) southeast of downtown Cleveland. The property lays primarily in Beachwood and, at its northernmost tip, in Shaker Heights. The site was chosen for its high elevation, rolling hills, brooks, and wooded areas.

Designed by architect Herbert Strong, development of the course began in 1921. The first nine holes were opened on July 1, 1922. The second nine were completed shortly thereafter. The course was later enlarged and reconstructed, in 1928, by W. H. Way.

The club is named for Canterbury, Connecticut, the birthplace of Cleveland's founder, General Moses Cleaveland. Female members were first admitted in 1923.

== Yardage and ratings ==
Tees	Yardage	Par	Rating	Slope
Championship	7012	70	74.3	139
Canterbury	6538	72	72.0	133
Mid-Forward	6224	72	70.8	129
Forward	5491	72	72.4	128

== Notable facts ==
- Canterbury is the second club to host all five of the men's rotating major championships, played within the United States: the U.S. Open, the U.S Senior Open, the PGA Championship, the Senior PGA Championship, and the U.S. Amateur. (Oak Hill C.C. completed the set of five in 2008, one year before Canterbury did so.)
- Canterbury was the site of Jack Nicklaus' 12th major professional victory, the 1973 PGA Championship. With this victory and his two U.S. Amateur championships, Nicklaus surpassed Bobby Jones' career record of 13 professional/amateur majors.
- The competitive course record is 66, held by six players: Al Geiberger, Lee Trevino, Don Iverson, Denny Lyons, and Buddy Allin (all at the 1973 PGA Championship) and Bobby Clampett (at the 1979 U.S. Amateur).
- In 2009 at Canterbury, Michael Allen became the second man, after Arnold Palmer, to debut on the Senior (champions) Tour by winning the Senior PGA Championship.
- At 608 yards, Canterbury's sixteenth hole and the seventh at Brooklawn C.C. are the longest Par 5 holes ever played at a U.S. Senior Open
- Canterbury hosted the first four Senior Tournament Players Championships, 1983–86.

== Major tournaments hosted ==
Canterbury has been the site of 13 major championships at the professional, senior professional, and amateur levels. Modern day majors of the PGA Tour are highlighted.

Year	Tournament	Winner	Score	To par	Margin of victory	Winner's share ($)
1932	Western Open (a)	(United States) Walter Hagen	288	E	1 stroke	500
1937	Western Open	(United States) Ralph Guldahl	287	−1	Playoff (b)	500
1940	U.S. Open	(United States) Lawson Little	287	−1	Playoff (c)	1,000
1946	U.S. Open	(United States) Lloyd Mangrum	284	−4	Playoff (d)	1,833
1964	U.S. Amateur	(United States) William C. Campbell	1 up	n/a	n/a	n/a
1973	PGA Championship	(United States) Jack Nicklaus	277	−7	4 strokes	45,000
1979	U.S. Amateur	(United States) Mark O'Meara	8 & 7	n/a	n/a	n/a
1983	Senior Tournament Players Championship	(United States) Miller Barber	278	−10	1 stroke	40,000
1984	Senior Tournament Players Championship	(United States) Arnold Palmer	276	−12	3 strokes	36,000
1985	Senior Tournament Players Championship	(United States) Arnold Palmer	274	−14	11 strokes	36,000
1986	Senior Tournament Players Championship	(United States) Chi-Chi Rodríguez	206	−10	2 strokes	45,000
1996	U.S. Senior Open	(United States) Dave Stockton	277	−11	2 strokes	215,500
2009	Senior PGA Championship	(United States) Michael Allen	274	−6	2 strokes	360,000

- a – Unofficial major.
- b – Guldahl defeated Horton Smith in a playoff.
- c – Little defeated Gene Sarazen by 3 strokes in an 18-hole playoff. Ed Oliver was also tied with Little and Sarazen at the end of regulation play, but was disqualified from the playoff for having started the fourth round early so as to avoid a coming storm.
- d – Mangrum remained tied with Byron Nelson and Vic Ghezzi after an 18-hole playoff, then defeated both by 1 stroke in a second 18-hole playoff.
