= 1991 U.S. Women's Open =

Coordinates: 32.717°N 97.373°W

Tournament information
- Dates: July 11–14, 1991
- Location: Fort Worth, Texas
- Course: Colonial Country Club
- Organized by: USGA
- Tour: LPGA Tour

Statistics
- Par: 71
- Length: 6,340 yards (5,797 m)
- Cut: 152 (+10)
- Prize fund: $600,000
- Winner's share: $110,000

Champion
- (United States) Meg Mallon
- 283 (−1)

Location in the United States
Location in Texas

The 1991 U.S. Women's Open was the 46th edition of the U.S. Women's Open, held July 11–14 at Colonial Country Club in Fort Worth, Texas. Meg Mallon shot a final round 67 (−4) to finish at 283 (−1), two strokes ahead of runner-up Pat Bradley. Mallon trailed Bradley by three strokes with ten holes to play. It was the second of Mallon's four major titles; she won the LPGA Championship two weeks earlier. Mallon won her second U.S. Women's Open and final major thirteen years later in 2004.

Play was so painstakingly slow during the first round that Lori Garbacz decided to protest. While playing the 14th hole, Garbacz had her caddie go to a nearby pay phone and order a pizza that she wanted delivered to the 17th tee. The pizza was waiting for Garbacz and she had plenty of time to eat it, as there were two groups ahead of her waiting to tee off.

Mallon won $110,000, the championship's first six-figure winner's share. It was an increase of nearly 30% over the previous year and double that of just four years earlier. Mallon's name was also engraved into the course's Wall of Champions.

Colonial has been an annual stop on the PGA Tour since 1946; now known as the Charles Schwab Challenge, it is usually played in May. It also hosted the U.S. Open in 1941, the last before World War II. It was the last time a U. S. Women's Open was conducted on a golf course that hosts a men's PGA Tour annual event until 2023, when the tournament is scheduled to be conducted at the Pebble Beach Golf Links, one of the courses of the AT&T Pebble Beach Pro-Am and the PURE Insurance Championship for the PGA Tour Champions (over-50).

== Round summaries ==
=== First round ===
Thursday, July 11, 1991

Place	Player	Score	To par
1	(United States) Pat Bradley	69	−2
T2	(United States) Laurel Kean	70	−1
T2	(United States) Meg Mallon	70	−1
T2	(United States) Joan Pitcock	70	−1
T5	(United States) Jane Geddes	71	E
T5	(United States) Sarah LeBrun Ingram (a)	71	E
T7	(United States) Danielle Ammaccapane	72	+1
T7	(United States) Judy Dickinson	72	+1
T7	(South Africa) Sally Little	72	+1
T7	(United States) Dana Lofland	72	+1
T7	(United States) Debbie Massey	72	+1
T7	(United States) Missie McGeorge	72	+1
T7	(United States) Mindy Moore	72	+1
T7	(United States) Alice Ritzman	72	+1
T7	(United States) Nancy Scranton	72	+1
T7	(United States) Colleen Walker	72	+1

=== Second round ===
Friday, July 12, 1991

Place	Player	Score	To par
T1	(United States) Pat Bradley	69-73=142	E
T1	(United States) Joan Pitcock	70-72=142	E
T3	(United States) Amy Alcott	75-68=143	+1
T3	(United States) Alice Ritzman	72-71=143	+1
5	(United States) Debbie Massey	72-72=144	+2
T6	(United States) Danielle Ammaccapane	72-73=145	+3
T6	(United States) Jody Anschutz	73-72=145	+3
T6	(United States) JoAnne Carner	73-72=145	+3
T6	(United States) Jane Geddes	71-74=145	+3
T6	(United States) Meg Mallon	70-75=145	+3

=== Third round ===
Saturday, July 13, 1991

Place	Player	Score	To par
T1	(United States) Pat Bradley	69-73-72=214	+1
T1	(United States) Joan Pitcock	70-72-72=214	+1
T3	(United States) Amy Alcott	75-68-72=215	+2
T3	(United States) Brandie Burton	75-71-69=215	+2
T5	(United States) Christa Johnson	76-72-68=216	+3
T5	(United States) Meg Mallon	70-75-71=216	+3
T5	(United States) Kris Tschetter	77-72-67=216	+3
T8	(United States) Kristi Albers	76-70-71=217	+4
T8	(United States) Jody Anschutz	73-72-72=217	+4
T8	(United States) Laurel Kean	70-76-71=217	+4
T8	(United States) Dottie Pepper	73-76-68=217	+4

=== Final round ===
Sunday, July 14, 1991

Place	Player	Score	To par	Money ($)
1	(United States) Meg Mallon	70-75-71-67=283	−1	110,000
2	(United States) Pat Bradley	69-73-72-71=285	+1	55,000
3	(United States) Amy Alcott	75-68-72-71=286	+2	32,882
4	(United States) Laurel Kean	70-76-71-70=287	+3	23,996
T5	(United States) Christa Johnson	76-72-68-72=288	+4	17,601
T5	(United States) Dottie Pepper	73-76-68-71=288	+4	17,601
7	(United States) Joan Pitcock	70-72-72-75=289	+5	14,623
T8	(United States) Brandie Burton	75-71-69-75=290	+6	12,252
T8	(United States) Jody Anschutz	73-72-72-73=290	+6	12,252
T8	(United States) Kristi Albers	76-70-71-73=290	+6	12,252
