= 1940 U.S. Open (golf) =

Coordinates: 41.469°N 81.521°W

Tournament information
- Dates: June 6–9, 1940
- Location: Beachwood, Ohio
- Course: Canterbury Golf Club
- Organized by: USGA
- Tour: PGA Tour

Statistics
- Par: 72
- Length: 6,894 yards (6,304 m)
- Field: 161 players, 66 after cut
- Cut: 153 (+9)
- Winner's share: $1,000

Champion
- (United States) Lawson Little
- 287 (−1), playoff

Location in the United States
Location in Ohio

The 1940 U.S. Open was the 44th U.S. Open, June 6–9 at Canterbury Golf Club in Beachwood, Ohio, a suburb east of Cleveland. Lawson Little defeated Gene Sarazen in an 18-hole playoff to win his only professional major.

Little started the final round a stroke behind leader Frank Walsh and carded a 73 to finish at 287. Sarazen made two birdies on the back nine and did not make a bogey to also post 287 and force a playoff on Sunday.

After five holes in the playoff, Little had a four-stroke advantage and was ahead by three at the turn. Sarazen made birdie at 11 and 14 to close the gap to one stroke with four holes to play, but could draw no closer. Little birdied the next two holes and they halved the final two holes. Little won by three, 70 to 73, and became the fifth player to win both the U.S. Open and the U.S. Amateur.

Six players were disqualified after the final round for starting their round too early to avoid a coming storm. One of those players, Ed Oliver, actually tied Little and Sarazen, but his disqualification prevented his participation in the playoff. Walter Hagen, in his final U.S. Open, was also disqualified for showing up late for his third round. Under current rules, Hagen would be penalised two strokes if he arrived within a grace period. Also under current rules, officials, with access to weather radar, reserve the right to accelerate the start of the final round and change its procedure (groups of three starting at the first and tenth tees, or a shotgun start).

The top eight finishers in the tournament were all past or future major champions, and are members of the World Golf Hall of Fame.

This was the first of three majors at Canterbury. The U.S. Open returned six years later in 1946, won by Lloyd Mangrum in two playoff rounds. It was the first U.S. Open in five years, due to World War II. The PGA Championship was played at the course in 1973, won by Jack Nicklaus.

== Course layout ==
Hole	1	2	3	4	5	6	7	8	9	Out	10	11	12	13	14	15	16	17	18	In	Total
Yards	430	369	176	440	410	477	200	412	553	3,467	367	170	374	483	403	371	588	230	441	3,427	6,894
Par	4	4	3	4	4	5	3	4	5	36	4	3	4	5	4	4	5	3	4	36	72

== Round summaries ==
=== First round ===
Thursday, June 6, 1940

Place	Player	Score	To par
1	(United States) Sam Snead	67	−5
T2	(United States) Ed Oliver	69	−3
T2	(United States) Sam Parks, Jr.	69	−3
T2	(United States) Horton Smith	69	−3
T5	(United States) Al Huske	70	−2
T5	(United States) Vic Ghezzi	70	−2
T5	(United States) Ben Hogan	70	−2
T8	(United States) Bob Babbish (a)	71	−1
T8	(Scotland) Andy Gibson	71	−1
T8	(United States) Duke Gibson	71	−1
T8	(United States) Henry Kaiser	71	−1
T8	(United States) Gene Sarazen	71	−1

=== Second round ===
Friday, June 7, 1940

Place	Player	Score	To par
T1	(United States) Lawson Little	72-69=141	−3
T1	(United States) Horton Smith	69-72=141	−3
T1	(United States) Sam Snead	67-74=141	−3
4	(United States) Frank Walsh	73-69=142	−2
T5	(United States) Ben Hogan	70-73=143	−1
T5	(United States) Sam Parks, Jr.	69-74=213	−1
T7	(United States) Leonard Dodson	72-72=144	E
T7	(United States) Vic Ghezzi	70-74=144	E
T7	(United States) Ralph Guldahl	73-71=144	E
T7	(United States) Dutch Harrison	74-70=144	E

=== Third round ===
Saturday, June 8, 1940 (morning)

Place	Player	Score	To par
1	(United States) Frank Walsh	73-69-71=213	−3
T2	(United States) Lawson Little	72-69-73=214	−2
T2	(United States) Sam Snead	67-74-73=214	−2
4	(United States) Gene Sarazen	71-74-70=215	−1
T5	(United States) Lloyd Mangrum	75-70-71=216	E
T5	(United States) Jug McSpaden	74-72-70=216	E
T5	(United States) Byron Nelson	72-74-70=216	E
T8	(United States) Ben Hogan	70-73-74=217	+1
T8	(United States) Henry Picard	73-73-71=217	+1
T8	(United States) Craig Wood	72-73-72=217	+1

=== Final round ===
Saturday, June 8, 1940 (afternoon)

Place	Player	Score	To par	Money ($)
T1	(United States) Lawson Little	72-69-73-73=287	−1	Playoff
T1	(United States) Gene Sarazen	71-74-70-72=287	−1	Playoff
3	(United States) Horton Smith	69-72-78-69=288	E	700
4	(United States) Craig Wood	72-73-72-72=289	+1	600
T5	(United States) Ralph Guldahl	73-71-76-70=290	+2	325
T5	(United States) Ben Hogan	70-73-74-73=290	+2	325
T5	(United States) Lloyd Mangrum	75-70-71-74=290	+2	325
T5	(United States) Byron Nelson	72-74-70-74=290	+2	325
9	(United States) Dick Metz	75-72-72-72=291	+3	175
T10	(United States) Ed Dudley	73-75-71-73=292	+4	137
T10	(United States) Frank Walsh	73-69-71-79=292	+4	137

=== Playoff ===
Sunday, June 9, 1940

Place	Player	Score	To par	Money ($)
1	(United States) Lawson Little	70	−2	1,000
2	(United States) Gene Sarazen	73	+1	800

==== Scorecard ====
Hole	1	2	3	4	5	6	7	8	9	10	11	12	13	14	15	16	17	18
Par	4	4	3	4	4	5	3	4	5	4	3	4	5	4	4	5	3	4
(United States) Little	E	−1	−1	−1	−2	−2	−2	−2	−2	−2	−2	−1	−1	−1	−2	−3	−2	−2
(United States) Sarazen	+1	+1	+1	+1	+2	E	+1	+1	+1	+1	E	E	+1	E	E	E	+1	+1

Cumulative playoff scores, relative to par

Eagle	Birdie	Bogey
