= Herbert H. Ramsay =

American golf administrator (1887–1939)

Herbert H. Hartley
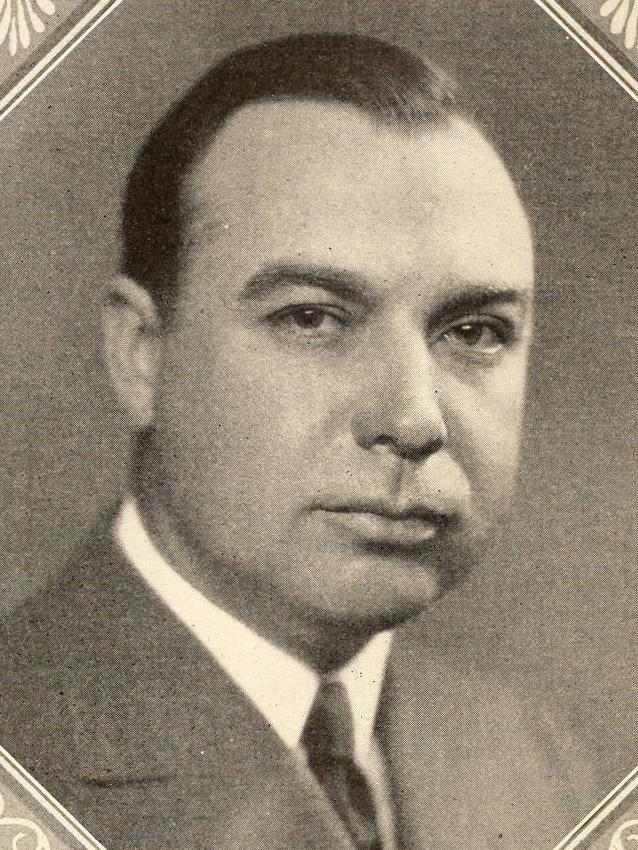
- 1928
- Born: Herbert Hartley Ramsey; February 16, 1887; Saginaw, Michigan, US
- Died: January 27, 1939 (aged 51); New York City, New York, US
- Other name: "Tack" Hartley
- Education: New York University; Yale University; Phillips-Andover Academy
- Occupation: Attorney
- Employer(s): Rogers, Ramsay & Hoge
- Known for: United States Golf Association administrator

Herbert Hartley Ramsay (February 16, 1887 - January 27, 1939) was an American attorney and golf administrator. He was president of the United States Golf Association and was responsible for enacting policies that were key in shaping competitive golfing as it is known today. He was also the sports broadcaster for the first Masters Tournament.

== Early life ==
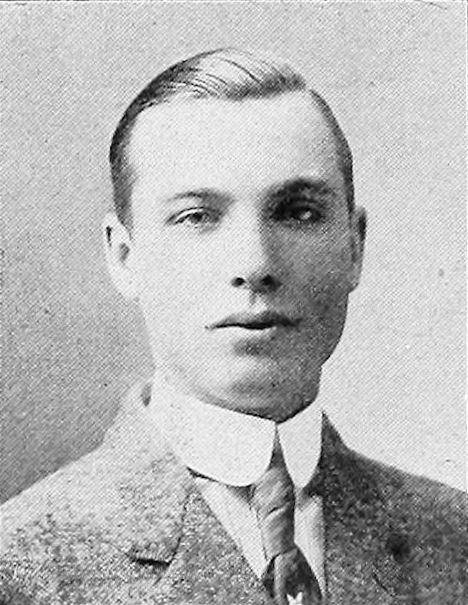
Herbert Hartley Ramsay, 1905

Ramsay was born in Saginaw, Michigan, but lived in Lake Charles, Louisiana while growing up and moved to Los Angeles, California after his freshman year of college. He was the son of Katherine Penoyer and William E. Ramsay, a lumberman with The Bradley, Ramsay Lumber Company which operated in both Michigan and Louisiana. His nickname was "Tack" because his older brother was "Spike", and he was a littler version of a spike or a tack.

He attended Phillips-Andover Academy, graduating with high honors. While at Phillips, he was captain of the golf team and manager of the football eleven. He attended Yale University, receiving a B.A. in philosophy in 1908. At Yale, he was a member of the Fraternity of Delta Psi (St. Anthony Hall), vice president of the Freshman Baseball Association, vice president of the University Baseball Association, and manager of the football team.

Next, he attended New York University, receiving a Bachelor of Laws and a Doctor of Jurisprudence.

He was lieutenant in the Navy Reserve during World War I.

== Career ==
Ramsay was an attorney with Rogers, Ramsay & Hoge at 41 East 42nd Street in New York City.

He was a director of the American Machine and Foundry Company and the International Cigar Machinery Company. He was vice president of the Sterling Products Corporation. He was also a director of the Madison Square Garden Corporation.

He was a member of the American Bar Association, the Association of the Bar of New York City, the New York County Lawyers' Association, the New York State Bar Association, and the Trade and Commerce Bar Association.

== Golf ==
Ramsay was an avid golfer who was a member of the Augusta National Golf Club in Georgia, The Creek in New York, the Deepdale Golf Club in New York, National Golf Links of America in New York, and the National Golf Club in Maryland.

He was the bodyguard for the legendary amateur champion golfer Bobby Jones for five years, approximately 1925 to 1930. This included coordinating the movement of the large galleries that followed Jones on the golf course.

Ramsay was elected president of the United States Golf Association (USGA) in 1931 and again in 1932, leading it through two of the organization's most critical years. He was the USGA secretary in 1925 and vice president in 1928 through 1930. He also chaired every USGA committee. In 1927, he chaired the eligibility committee that determined George J. Voigt's status as amateur. In both 1929 and 1930, in addition to being elected vice president, he was also chairman of the rules of golf committee, chairman of the championship committee, chairman of the publicity committee, and a member of the implements and ball committee. In 1930, his duties took him from the Walker Cup matches in Britain to the U.S. Open in Minneapolis, Minnesota, to the women's championship in Los Angeles, California.

In his various capacities, Ramsay enacted policies that were key in shaping competitive golfing as it is known today. For example, "he was a stickler for silence on the golf course." As a result, he ended the marshals having megaphones and instituted the silence rules. He also limited the filming of motion pictures during active play. When he was chairman of the championship committee, he developed strategies for running a national championship and shared this information with clubs hosting big tournaments. He created the sectional qualifying system that is still used for the national open championship.

Ramsay was also USGA president when the size and weight of the golf ball were reduced. He defended the change, noting that it would improve results for average players while leaving the professional players with about the same performance. However, the smaller ball proved unpopular, leading the USGA to change the standard in 1932. Ramsey said, "We believe the 1932 ball, from all aspects, is the most desirable golf ball that can be built."

His primary interest was the USGA's Green Section. According to the USGA website, "The USGA's Green Section develops and disseminates sustainable management practices that produce better playing conditions for better golf." Ramsay said, "If it weren't for the Green Section we wouldn't have any golf."

Ramsay was the CBS Radio sports announcer for the 1934 Masters Tournament, stepping in for Graham McNamee who was unavailable. This first Masters and only the second time that a golf tournament was broadcast live—the first being the 1930 U.S. Open. Ramsay not only "put on a swell job of broadcasting, [but also] pronounced it one of the greatest golf shows he had ever seen."

== Personal ==
Ramsay married Constance McCall, the daughter of New York Supreme Court Justice Edward Everett McCall, on September 12, 1925, in East Hampton, New York. They had two sons: Allan Ramsay and Hartley Ramsay.

He was a member of the Cloud Club, the Coffee House Club, the St. Anthony Club of New York, and the Yale Club of New York City.

In 1939, he died at the age of 52 in Roosevelt Hospital in New York City.
