= 1941 Masters Tournament =

Golf tournament

Tournament information
- Dates: April 3–6, 1941
- Location: Augusta, Georgia; 33.503°N 82.020°W
- Course: Augusta National Golf Club
- Organized by: Augusta National Golf Club
- Tour: PGA Tour

Statistics
- Par: 72
- Length: 6,800 yards (6,220 m)
- Field: 51 players
- Cut: None
- Prize fund: $5,000
- Winner's share: $1,500

Champion
- (United States) Craig Wood
- 280 (−8)
- Location in the United States Location in Georgia

The 1941 Masters Tournament was the eighth Masters Tournament, held April 3–6 at Augusta National Golf Club in Augusta, Georgia. Craig Wood won his first major title, three strokes ahead of runner-up Byron Nelson.

Wood opened with a 66 and led by five strokes after the first round. During the final round, Nelson caught him on the front nine and the two were briefly co-leaders. Wood scored a 34 (−2) over the final nine holes to secure the victory. The purse was $5,000 and the winner's share was $1,500.

Wood, 39, led the entire tournament, the Masters' first wire-to-wire champion. He also won the next major, the 1941 U.S. Open. Prior to his win at the Masters, Wood had lost in a playoff (or extra holes) in all four of the modern major championships, a dubious distinction since matched by only one other, Greg Norman.

Through 2026, there have been only five wire-to-wire champions; Wood was followed by Arnold Palmer (1960), Jack Nicklaus (1972), Raymond Floyd (1976), Jordan Spieth (2015), and Rory McIlroy in 2026.

== Field ==
1. Masters champions

Jimmy Demaret (9), Ralph Guldahl (2,9,10,12), Byron Nelson (2,6,9,10,12), Gene Sarazen (2,4,6,9,10,12), Horton Smith (10)

- Henry Picard (6,9,10) did not play.

2. U.S. Open champions

Tommy Armour (4,6,10), Walter Hagen (4,6), Bobby Jones (3,4,5), Lawson Little (3,5,9,10), Tony Manero (9), Francis Ouimet (3,a), Sam Parks Jr. (10)

3. U.S. Amateur champions

Dick Chapman (11,a)

4. British Open champions

Denny Shute (6)

5. British Amateur champions

Charlie Yates (9,a)

6. PGA champions

Paul Runyan (9,12)

7. Members of the U.S. Ryder Cup team

- Not held

8. Members of the U.S. Walker Cup team

- Not held

9. Top 30 players and ties from the 1940 Masters Tournament

Johnny Bulla, Sammy Byrd, Harry Cooper, Ed Dudley (10), Jim Foulis (10), Willie Goggin, Jimmy Hines (10), Ben Hogan (10,12), Lloyd Mangrum (10), Jug McSpaden (10,12), Dick Metz (10), Toney Penna, Sam Snead (10,12), Frank Walsh (10), Al Watrous, Craig Wood (10)

- Johnny Farrell (2,10), Ed Oliver, Johnny Revolta (6,10) and Bud Ward (3,11,a) did not play.

10. Top 30 players and ties from the 1940 U.S. Open

Bruce Coltart, Vic Ghezzi, Andy Gibson, Jock Hutchison Jr., Gene Kunes, Ray Mangrum, Henry Ransom, Jack Ryan, Felix Serafin, Andrew Szwedko (a)

- Al Huske, Eddie Kirk (12), Wilford Wehrle (11,a) and Pat Willcox did not play.

11. 1940 U.S. Amateur quarter-finalists

George Dawson (a), Duff McCullough (a)

- Ray Billows (a), John P. Burke (a) and Johnny Fischer (3,a) did not play

12. 1940 PGA Championship quarter-finalists

13. One amateur, not already qualified, selected by a ballot of ex-U.S. Amateur champions

Art Doering (a)

14. One professional, not already qualified, selected by a ballot of ex-U.S. Open champions

Jimmy Thomson

15. Two players, not already qualified, with the best scoring average in the winter part of the 1940 PGA Tour

Leonard Dodson, Clayton Heafner

16 Foreign invitations

Jim Ferrier (9,10), Martin Pose

- Numbers in brackets indicate categories that the player would have qualified under had they been American.

== Round summaries ==
=== First round ===
Thursday, April 3, 1941

Place	Player	Score	To par
1	(United States) Craig Wood	66	−6
T2	(United States) Willie Goggin	71	−1
T2	(United States) Ben Hogan	71	−1
T2	(United States) Lawson Little	71	−1
T2	(United States) Byron Nelson	71	−1
T6	(United States) Harry Cooper	72	E
T6	(United States) Felix Serafin	72	E
T8	(United States) Johnny Bulla	73	+1
T8	(United States) Sammy Byrd	73	+1
T8	(United States) Ed Dudley	73	+1
T8	(United States) Clayton Heafner	73	+1
T8	(United States) Tony Manero	73	+1
T8	(United States) Toney Penna	73	+1
T8	(United States) Jack Ryan	73	+1
T8	(United States) Jimmy Thomson	73	+1
T8	(United States) Sam Snead	73	+1

=== Second round ===
Friday, April 4, 1941

Place	Player	Score	To par
1	(United States) Craig Wood	66-71=137	−7
2	(United States) Byron Nelson	71-69=140	−4
3	(United States) Lawson Little	71-70=141	−3
T4	(United States) Sammy Byrd	73-70=143	−1
T4	(United States) Willie Goggin	71-72=143	−1
T4	(United States) Ben Hogan	71-72=143	−1
T4	(United States) Clayton Heafner	73-70=143	−1
T4	(United States) Jug McSpaden	76-67=143	−1
T9	(United States) Ed Dudley	73-72=145	+1
T9	(United States) Harry Cooper	72-73=145	+1

=== Third round ===
Saturday, April 5, 1941

Place	Player	Score	To par
1	(United States) Craig Wood	66-71-71=208	−8
2	(United States) Sammy Byrd	73-70-68=211	−5
3	(United States) Byron Nelson	71-69-73=213	−3
T4	(United States) Willie Goggin	71-72-72=215	−1
T4	(United States) Lawson Little	71-70-74=215	−1
6	(United States) Jimmy Demaret	77-69-71=217	+1
7	(United States) Ben Hogan	71-72-75=218	+2
T8	(United States) Dick Chapman (a)	76-73-70=219	+3
T8	(United States) Vic Ghezzi	77-71-71=219	+3
T8	(United States) Clayton Heafner	73-70-76=219	+3

=== Final round ===
Sunday, April 6, 1941

==== Final leaderboard ====
Top 10
Place	Player	Score	To par	Money (US$)
1	(United States) Craig Wood	66-71-71-72=280	−8	1,500
2	(United States) Byron Nelson (c)	71-69-73-70=283	−5	800
3	(United States) Sammy Byrd	73-70-68-74=285	−3	600
4	(United States) Ben Hogan	71-72-75-68=286	−2	500
5	(United States) Ed Dudley	73-72-75-68=288	E	400
T6	(United States) Vic Ghezzi	77-71-71-70=289	+1	275
T6	(United States) Sam Snead	73-75-72-69=289	+1	275
8	(United States) Lawson Little	71-70-74-75=290	+2	200
T9	(United States) Willie Goggin	71-72-72-76=291	+3	117
T9	(United States) Lloyd Mangrum	71-72-72-76=291	+3	117
T9	(United States) Jug McSpaden	76-67-80-68=291	+3	117

Leaderboard below the top 10
Place	Player	Score	To par	Money ($)
T12	(United States) Jimmy Demaret (c)	77-69-71-75=292	+4	100
T12	(United States) Clayton Heafner	73-70-76-73=292	+4	100
T14	(United States) Harry Cooper	72-73-75-73=293	+5	
T14	(United States) Ralph Guldahl (c)	76-71-75-71=293	+5	
T14	(United States) Jimmy Thomson	73-75-72-73=293	+5	
17	(United States) Jack Ryan	73-74-74-74=295	+7	
18	(United States) Denny Shute	77-75-74-70=296	+8	
T19	(United States) Dick Chapman (a)	76-73-70-78=297	+9	
T19	(United States) Jimmy Hines	76-74-75-72=297	+9	
T19	(United States) Gene Kunes	76-74-76-71=297	+9	
T19	(United States) Dick Metz	74-72-75-76=297	+9	
T19	(United States) Sam Parks Jr.	75-76-75-71=297	+9	
T19	(United States) Toney Penna	73-74-80-70=297	+9	
T19	(United States) Gene Sarazen (c)	76-72-74-75=297	+9	
T19	(United States) Felix Serafin	72-79-74-72=297	+9	
T19	(United States) Horton Smith (c)	74-72-77-74=297	+9	
28	(United States) Ray Mangrum	76-70-78-74=298	+10	
T29	(Australia) Jim Ferrier	75-76-73-75=299	+11	
T29	(United States) Jim Foulis	76-75-71-77=299	+11	
T29	(Argentina) Martin Pose	77-74-76-72=299	+11	
32	(United States) Al Watrous	74-75-76-75=300	+12	
33	(United States) Leonard Dodson	75-77-78-71=301	+13	
34	(United States) George Dawson (a)	74-78-77-73=302	+14	
T35	(United States) Paul Runyan	78-78-74-73=303	+15	
T35	(United States) Charlie Yates (a)	78-75-75-75=303	+15	
37	(United States) Frank Walsh	74-76-76-78=304	+16	
38	(United States) Tommy Armour	75-75-76-79=305	+17	
39	(United States) Johnny Bulla	73-76-78-79=306	+18	
40	(United States) Bobby Jones	76-74-78-79=307	+19	
41	(United States) Bruce Coltart	80-78-75-75=308	+20	
42	(United States) Andy Gibson	78-75-80-76=309	+21	
43	(United States) Jock Hutchison Jr.	77-81-76-78=312	+24	
T44	(United States) Tony Manero	73-80-78-82=313	+25	
T44	(United States) Duff McCullough (a)	79-74-84-76=313	+25	
46	(United States) Art Doering (a)	77-79-77-81=314	+26	
47	(United States) Andrew Szwedko (a)	81-79-78-81=319	+31	
WD	(United States) Francis Ouimet (a)	82	+10	
WD	(United States) Walter Hagen	87	+15	
WD	(United States) Henry Ransom			
