= 1973 PGA Championship =

Coordinates: 41.469°N 81.521°W

Tournament information
- Dates: August 9–12, 1973
- Location: Beachwood, Ohio
- Course(s): Canterbury Golf Club
- Organized by: PGA of America
- Tour(s): PGA Tour

Statistics
- Par: 71
- Length: 6,852 yards (6,265 m)
- Field: 148 players, 74 after cut
- Cut: 149 (+7)
- Prize fund: $225,000
- Winner's share: $45,000

Champion
- (United States) Jack Nicklaus
- 277 (−7)

Location in the United States
Location in Ohio

The 1973 PGA Championship was the 55th PGA Championship, played August 9–12 at Canterbury Golf Club in Beachwood, Ohio, a suburb east of Cleveland. Ohio native Jack Nicklaus won the third of his five PGA Championships, four strokes ahead of runner-up Bruce Crampton.

It was the 12th of Nicklaus' 18 major titles as a professional. At the time, the holder of the most major titles was the late Bobby Jones, with 13. As a lifelong amateur, his majors were the Open and amateur championships in the U.S. and Britain. Including his two U.S. Amateur titles, Nicklaus now had 14 majors, surpassing Jones. With his 12th professional major win Nicklaus also usurped Walter Hagen's record of 11 professional major victories.

Sam Snead, age 61, shot even-par each day and finished in the top ten for the second straight year; he tied for ninth after a tie for fourth in 1972 and would improve on those in 1974.

This was the third major at Canterbury, which hosted the U.S. Open twice in the 1940s, both decided in playoffs. Lawson Little was the champion in 1940 with a three-stroke win over Gene Sarazen. Following World War II in 1946, the first U.S. Open in five years was played at the course. Lloyd Mangrum won in the second 18-hole playoff round, one stroke ahead of major winners Byron Nelson and Vic Ghezzi.

== Round summaries ==
=== First round ===
Thursday, August 9, 1973

| Place | Player | Score | To par |
|---|---|---|---|
| T1 | (United States) Al Geiberger | 67 | −4 |
| T1 | (United States) Don Iverson | 67 | −4 |
| T3 | (United States) Bob Dickson | 69 | −2 |
| T3 | (United States) Mike Hill | 69 | −2 |
| T3 | (United States) Don Iverson | 69 | −2 |
| T6 | (United States) Don Bies | 70 | −1 |
| T6 | (United States) Bob Brue | 70 | −1 |
| T6 | (United States) Raymond Floyd | 70 | −1 |
| T6 | (United States) Gibby Gilbert | 70 | −1 |
| T6 | (England) Tony Jacklin | 70 | −1 |
| T6 | (United States) Tom Weiskopf | 70 | −1 |

=== Second round ===
Friday, August 10, 1973

| Place | Player | Score | To par |
|---|---|---|---|
| T1 | (United States) Don Iverson | 67-72=139 | −3 |
| T1 | (United States) Mason Rudolph | 69-70=139 | −3 |
| T3 | (United States) Gibby Gilbert | 70-70=140 | −2 |
| T3 | (United States) Jack Nicklaus | 72-68=140 | −2 |
| T3 | (United States) Dan Sikes | 72-68=140 | −2 |
| T6 | (England) Tony Jacklin | 70-70=141 | −1 |
| T6 | (United States) Dave Stockton | 72-69=141 | −1 |
| T6 | (United States) Tom Weiskopf | 70-71=141 | −1 |
| T9 | (United States) Don Bies | 70-72=142 | E |
| T9 | (United States) Bob Brue | 70-72=142 | E |
| T9 | (United States) Jim Colbert | 72-70=142 | E |
| T9 | (United States) Mike Hill | 69-73=142 | E |
| T9 | (United States) Sam Snead | 71-71=142 | E |
| T9 | (United States) Lanny Wadkins | 73-69=142 | E |

=== Third round ===
Saturday, August 11, 1973

| Place | Player | Score | To par |
|---|---|---|---|
| 1 | (United States) Jack Nicklaus | 72-68-68=208 | −5 |
| T2 | (United States) Don Iverson | 67-72-70=209 | −4 |
| T2 | (United States) Mason Rudolph | 69-70-70=209 | −4 |
| 4 | (United States) Dennis Lyons | 73-70-67=210 | −3 |
| T5 | (Australia) Bruce Crampton | 71-73-67=211 | −2 |
| T5 | (United States) Jim Colbert | 72-70-69=211 | −2 |
| T7 | (United States) Dan Sikes | 72-68-72=212 | −1 |
| T7 | (United States) Tom Weiskopf | 70-71-71=212 | −1 |
| T9 | (United States) Don Bies | 70-72-71=213 | E |
| T9 | (United States) Gibby Gilbert | 70-70-73=213 | E |
| T9 | (United States) Sam Snead | 71-71-71=213 | E |
| T9 | (United States) Lanny Wadkins | 73-69-71=213 | E |

=== Final round ===
Sunday, August 12, 1973

| Place | Player | Score | To par | Money ($) |
|---|---|---|---|---|
| 1 | (United States) Jack Nicklaus | 72-68-68-69=277 | −7 | 45,000 |
| 2 | (Australia) Bruce Crampton | 71-73-67-70=281 | −3 | 25,700 |
| T3 | (United States) Mason Rudolph | 69-70-70-73=282 | −2 | 11,909 |
| T3 | (United States) J. C. Snead | 71-74-68-69=282 | −2 | 11,909 |
| T3 | (United States) Lanny Wadkins | 73-69-71-69=282 | −2 | 11,909 |
| T6 | (United States) Don Iverson | 67-72-70-74=283 | −1 | 7,312 |
| T6 | (United States) Dan Sikes | 72-68-72-71=283 | −1 | 7,312 |
| T6 | (United States) Tom Weiskopf | 70-71-71-71=283 | −1 | 7,312 |
| T9 | (United States) Hale Irwin | 76-72-68-68=284 | E | 5,625 |
| T9 | (United States) Sam Snead | 71-71-71-71=284 | E | 5,625 |
| T9 | (United States) Kermit Zarley | 76-71-68-69=284 | E | 5,625 |
