= 1934 Masters Tournament =

- Front cover of the 1934 Masters Official program

Tournament information
- Dates: March 22–25, 1934
- Location: Augusta, Georgia, U.S. 33.503°N 82.020°W
- Course: Augusta National Golf Club
- Organized by: Augusta National Golf Club
- Tour: PGA Tour

Statistics
- Par: 72
- Length: 6,700 yards (6,126 m)
- Field: 72 players
- Cut: None
- Prize fund: $5,000
- Winner's share: $1,500

Champion
- (United States) Horton Smith
- 284 (−4)
- Location in the United States Location in Georgia

The 1934 Masters Tournament was the first Masters Tournament, held March 22–25 at Augusta National Golf Club in Augusta, Georgia, United States. It was officially known as the "Augusta National Invitation Tournament" for its first five editions, but informally as the Masters from the start.

CBS Radio broadcast updates daily, making this the second golf tournament to be broadcast live. The sportscaster was Herbert H. Ramsay, former U.S. Golf Association president. This tournament also marked the return of Bobby Jones from retirement.

Horton Smith won the event with a 20-foot (6 m) birdie putt at the 17th hole (now the 8th hole), and finished at 284 (−4), one stroke ahead of runner-up Craig Wood. (The current nines were reversed in 1934, switched to the current configuration prior to the 1935 event.) Tournament co-founder and host Bobby Jones finished ten strokes back at 294, tied for thirteenth place. The total purse was $5,000 and the winner's share was $1,500.

== Course ==
Hole	Name	Yards	Par	Hole	Name	Yards	Par
1	Camellia	430	4	10	Tea Olive	400	4
2	White Dogwood	415	4	11	Pink Dogwood	525	5
3	Golden Bell	150	3	12	Flowering Peach	350	4
4	Azalea	480	5	13	Flowering Crab Apple	190	3
5	Chinese Fir	425	4	14	Magnolia	440	4
6	Firethorn	485	5	15	Juniper	185	3
7	Redbud	145	3	16	Pampas	340	4
8	Nandina	400	4	17	Yellow Jasmine	500	5
9	Holly	420	4	18	Carolina Cherry	420	4
Out		3,350	36	In		3,350	36
Source:				Total		6,700	72

- The holes' current names (2025) are listed above; the current nines were switched for 1934 only.

== Round summaries ==
=== First round ===
Thursday, March 22, 1934

Place	Player	Score	To par
T1	(United States) Horton Smith	70	−2
T1	(United States) Jimmy Hines	70	−2
T1	(United States) Emmet French	70	−2
T4	(United States) Craig Wood	71	−1
T4	(United States) Walter Hagen	71	−1
T4	(United States) Henry Picard	71	−1
T4	(United States) Johnny Golden	71	−1
T8	(United States) Billy Burke	72	E
T8	(United States) Ky Laffoon	72	E
T10	(United States) Denny Shute	73	+1
T10	(United States) Joe Paletti	73	+1
T10	(United States) Leo Diegel	73	+1

=== Second round ===
Friday, March 23, 1934

Place	Player	Score	To par
1	(United States) Horton Smith	70-72=142	−2
T2	(United States) Ed Dudley	74-69=143	−1
T2	(United States) Billy Burke	72-71=143	−1
T4	(Scotland) Macdonald Smith	74-70=144	E
T4	(United States) Jimmy Hines	70-74=144	E
T4	(United States) Ralph Stonehouse	74-70=144	E
T7	(United States) Al Espinosa	75-70=145	+1
T7	(United States) Leo Diegel	73-72=145	+1
T7	(United States) Paul Runyan	74-71=145	+1
T7	(United States) Craig Wood	71-74=145	+1

=== Third round ===
Saturday, March 24, 1934

Place	Name	Score	To par
1	(United States) Horton Smith	70-72-70=212	−4
2	(United States) Billy Burke	72-71-70=213	−3
T3	(United States) Craig Wood	71-74-69=214	−2
T3	(United States) Ed Dudley	74-69-71=214	−2
5	(United States) Paul Runyan	74-71-70=215	−1
T6	(United States) Walter Hagen	71-76-70=217	+1
T6	(Scotland) Willie Macfarlane	74-73-70=217	+1
T8	(United States) Jimmy Hines	70-74-74=218	+2
T8	(United States) Bill Schwartz	75-72-71=218	+2
T8	(Scotland) Macdonald Smith	74-70-74=218	+2

=== Final round ===
Sunday, March 25, 1934

Place	Name	Score	To par	Money ($)
1	(United States) Horton Smith	70-72-70-72=284	−4	1,500
2	(United States) Craig Wood	71-74-69-71=285	−3	800
T3	(United States) Billy Burke	72-71-70-73=286	−2	550
T3	(United States) Paul Runyan	74-71-70-71=286	−2	550
5	(United States) Ed Dudley	74-69-71-74=288	E	400
6	(Scotland) Willie Macfarlane	74-73-70-74=291	+3	300
T7	(United States) Al Espinosa	75-70-75-72=292	+4	175
T7	(United States) Jimmy Hines	70-74-74-74=292	+4	175
T7	(United States) Harold "Jug" McSpaden	77-74-72-69=292	+4	175
T7	(Scotland) Macdonald Smith	74-70-74-74=292	+4	175
