= Joan Pitcock =

American professional golfer (born 1967)

Personal information
- Nationality: United States
- Born: July 12, 1967 (age 59) Fresno, California, U.S.
- Height: 5 ft 4 in (1.63 m)

Career
- Sport: Golf
- Status: Professional
- Former tour: LPGA Tour (1988–2004)
- Professional wins: 1

Number of wins by tour
- LPGA Tour: 1

Best results in LPGA major championships
- Chevron Championship: T15: 1996
- Women's PGA C'ship: T11: 1993, 1995, 1998
- U.S. Women's Open: 7th: 1991
- du Maurier Classic: T15: 1991
- Women's British Open: DNP

Joan Pitcock (born July 12, 1967) is an American professional golfer who played on the LPGA Tour.

Pitcock has won once on the LPGA Tour in 1996.

At the 1991 U.S. Women's Open, Pitcock was the co-leader after 54 holes. Pitccock then shot a final round 75 and finished tied for 7th.

== Amateur wins ==
- 1983 California Junior Girls' State Amateur
- 1984 Junior World Golf Championships (Girls 15–17)

== Professional wins ==
=== LPGA Tour wins (1) ===
No.	Date	Tournament	Winning score	Margin of victory	Runner-up
1	Jul 7, 1996	Jamie Farr Kroger Classic	−8 (68-66-70=204)	1 stroke	(United States) Marianne Morris
