= 1946 U.S. Open (golf) =

Coordinates: 41.469°N 81.521°W

Tournament information
- Dates: June 12–16, 1946
- Location: Beachwood, Ohio
- Course: Canterbury Golf Club
- Organized by: USGA
- Tour: PGA Tour

Statistics
- Par: 72
- Length: 6,921 yards (6,329 m)
- Field: 168 players, 62 after cut
- Cut: 151 (+7)
- Prize fund: $8,000
- Winner's share: $1,833

Champion
- (United States) Lloyd Mangrum
- 284 (−4), playoff

Location in United States
Location in Ohio

The 1946 U.S. Open was the 46th U.S. Open, held June 12–16 at Canterbury Golf Club in Beachwood, Ohio, a suburb east of Cleveland. In the first U.S. Open since 1941, Lloyd Mangrum, a World War II veteran and recipient of two Purple Hearts, defeated Byron Nelson and Vic Ghezzi in 36 playoff holes to win his only major title.

Nelson's caddie possibly cost Nelson the championship in the third round when he accidentally kicked Nelson's ball; Nelson was assessed a one stroke penalty. Two months after the championship, Nelson announced his retirement from the tour at age 34, though he continued to play at the Masters through 1966. He also played twice again at the U.S. Open (1949 and 1955), and once at the British Open in 1955.

The purse was $8,000 with a winner's share of $1,500. The three participants received a playoff bonus of $333 each.

This was the last playoff at the U.S. Open that ended in a tie without sudden-death. The next dozen 18-hole full round playoffs determined a winner without the need for extra holes. The first time sudden-death was used for the 91st hole was in 1990, Hale Irwin's third title. It was needed again in 1994 and 2008.

This was the second U.S. Open at Canterbury in six years; the 1940 edition was won by Lawson Little. It later hosted the PGA Championship in 1973, won by Jack Nicklaus.

== Round summaries ==
=== First round ===
Thursday, June 13, 1946

Place	Player	Score	To par
T1	(United States) Toney Penna	69	−3
T1	(United States) Sam Snead	69	−3
T3	(United States) Bob Hamilton	70	−2
T3	(United States) Mike Turnesa	70	−2
T5	(United States) Skip Alexander	71	−1
T5	(United States) Jimmy Demaret	71	−1
T5	(United States) Vic Ghezzi	71	−1
T5	(United States) Scudday Horner	71	−1
T5	(United States) Steve Kovach	71	−1
T5	(United States) Byron Nelson	71	−1
T5	(United States) Ed Oliver	71	−1
T5	(United States) Henry Picard	71	−1
T5	(United States) Henry Ransom	71	−1

=== Second round ===
Friday, June 14, 1946

Place	Player	Score	To par
T1	(United States) Vic Ghezzi	71-69=140	−4
T1	(United States) Ben Hogan	72-68=140	−4
3	(United States) Lawson Little	72-69=141	−3
T4	(United States) Ed Oliver	71-71=142	−2
T4	(United States) Byron Nelson	71-71=142	−2
6	(United States) Steve Kovach	71-72=143	−1
T7	(United States) Herman Barron	72-72=144	E
T7	(United States) Lloyd Mangrum	74-70=144	E
T7	(United States) Henry Picard	71-73=144	E
T7	(United States) Henry Ransom	71-73=144	E
T7	(United States) Sam Snead	69-75=144	E

=== Third round ===
Saturday, June 15, 1946 (morning)

Place	Player	Score	To par
1	(United States) Byron Nelson	71-71-69=211	−5
T2	(United States) Vic Ghezzi	71-69-72=212	−4
T2	(United States) Lloyd Mangrum	74-70-68=212	−4
4	(United States) Ben Hogan	72-68-73=213	−3
5	(United States) Henry Picard	71-73-71=215	−1
T6	(United States) Herman Barron	72-72-72=216	E
T6	(United States) Steve Kovach	71-72-73=216	E
T6	(United States) Ed Oliver	71-71-74=216	E
T9	(United States) Chick Harbert	72-78-67=217	+1
T9	(United States) Chandler Harper	76-74-67=217	+1
T9	(United States) Henry Ransom	71-73-73=217	+1

=== Final round ===
Saturday, June 15, 1946 (afternoon)

Nelson began the final round with a one-stroke lead over Mangrum and Ghezzi. Ghezzi was the first to finish and carded a 72 and a 284 total. Nelson and Mangrum were playing together, and Nelson had a two-stroke advantage with three holes remaining. But after bogeys at his final two holes, combined with two pars by Mangrum, Nelson fell back into a tie and forced a three-way playoff.

Place	Player	Score	To par	Money ($)
T1	(United States) Lloyd Mangrum	74-70-68-72=284	−4	Playoff
T1	(United States) Vic Ghezzi	71-69-72-72=284	−4	Playoff
T1	(United States) Byron Nelson	71-71-69-73=284	−4	Playoff
T4	(United States) Herman Barron	72-72-72-69=285	−3	550
T4	(United States) Ben Hogan	72-68-73-72=285	−3	550
T6	(United States) Jimmy Demaret	71-74-73-68=286	−2	350
T6	(United States) Ed Oliver	71-71-74-70=286	−2	350
T8	(United States) Chick Harbert	72-78-67-70=287	−1	225
T8	(United States) Dick Metz	76-70-72-69=287	−1	225
T10	(United States) Dutch Harrison	75-71-72-70=288	E	175
T10	(United States) Lawson Little	72-69-76-71=288	E	175

=== Playoff ===
Sunday, June 16, 1946

All three players shot even-par 72 during the first 18 holes on Sunday morning, which forced another 18-hole playoff in the afternoon, as there was no sudden-death playoff at the time. At the 9th, Mangrum nearly shot himself out of contention with an out of bounds tee shot, but a 70-foot (20 m) putt for bogey allowed him to minimize the damage. Nelson and Ghezzi were tied at the turn, with Mangrum two back. But Mangrum then collected two birdies, while Nelson bogeyed 13 and Ghezzi recorded bogeys at 14 and 15. Mangrum took a two-stroke lead with a birdie at 16, and despite a bogey-bogey finish, his 72 was good enough to hold off Nelson and Ghezzi by a stroke.

Place	Player	Score	To par	Money ($)
1	(United States) Lloyd Mangrum	72-72=144	E	1,833
T2	(United States) Byron Nelson	72-73=145	+1	1,208
T2	(United States) Vic Ghezzi	72-73=145	+1	1,208

- Prize money includes $333 playoff bonus for each.

==== Scorecards ====
Morning round

Hole	1	2	3	4	5	6	7	8	9	10	11	12	13	14	15	16	17	18
Par	4	4	3	4	4	5	3	4	5	4	3	4	5	4	4	5	3	4
(United States) Mangrum	E	E	−1	E	−1	−1	−2	−2	−2	−2	−2	−3	−2	−1	−1	−1	E	E
(United States) Nelson	E	−1	−1	−1	−1	E	E	E	E	+1	+1	+1	E	E	E	E	E	E
(United States) Ghezzi	E	E	−1	−1	−2	−2	−1	−1	−2	−2	−2	−1	−2	−2	−1	E	E	E

Afternoon round

Hole	1	2	3	4	5	6	7	8	9	10	11	12	13	14	15	16	17	18
Par	4	4	3	4	4	5	3	4	5	4	3	4	5	4	4	5	3	4
(United States) Mangrum	−1	E	E	E	−1	−1	−1	−1	E	E	E	+1	E	E	−1	−2	−1	E
(United States) Nelson	E	E	E	E	E	−1	−2	−2	−2	−2	−1	−1	E	E	E	E	+1	+1
(United States) Ghezzi	E	E	E	E	E	−1	−1	−1	−2	−2	−1	−2	−2	−1	E	E	E	+1

Cumulative playoff scores, relative to par

Birdie	Bogey
