= Colonial National Invitation =

Annual golf tournament

Coordinates: 32.7170°N 97.3728°W

Charles Schwab Challenge

Tournament information
- Location: Fort Worth, Texas
- Established: 1946; 80 years ago
- Course: Colonial Country Club
- Par: 70
- Length: 7,289 yards (6,665 m)
- Tour: PGA Tour
- Format: Stroke play
- Prize fund: US$9,900,000
- Month played: May

Tournament record score
- Aggregate: 259 Zach Johnson (2010)
- To par: −21 as above

Current champion
- (United States) Russell Henley

Location map
- Location in the United States Location in Texas

The Charles Schwab Challenge at Colonial is a professional golf tournament in Texas on the PGA Tour, played annually in May in Fort Worth at Colonial Country Club, which organizes the event. The inaugural event, known at the time as the Colonial National Invitation, was held 80 years ago in 1946. It is one of five invitational tournaments on the PGA Tour.

== Overview ==
Founded in 1946, the tournament honors the history of golf by using an official Scottish tartan plaid jacket for its champions and top committee chairmen. Another tradition feeding Colonial history is the Wall of Champions on the first tee, engraved with the name and score of each champion dating back to 1946, plus the 1975 Tournament Players Championship, 1941 U.S. Open, and 1991 U.S. Women's Open.

The tournament is unofficially associated with Ben Hogan (1912–1997), the long-time Fort Worth resident who won the tournament five times, the most of any player. One of the top players in golf history, he won nine major titles, six after a near-fatal automobile collision in 1949 that kept him hospitalized for two months. Hogan's final three major wins were consecutive in 1953; a statue of him at swing completion is near the clubhouse.

Annika Sörenstam played in the 2003 tournament and became the first woman to play in a PGA Tour event in 58 years, since Babe Zaharias made three cuts as an amateur in 1945. Sörenstam's participation drew high media attention, but she shot 71 and 74 and missed the cut by four strokes.

In 2020, the tournament was held June 11–14 as the first PGA Tour event staged since the interruption of the regular schedule in mid-March due to the COVID-19 pandemic. In the interests of maximum health and safety, the event had no spectators, a PGA Tour first.

== Sponsors ==
The Charles Schwab Corporation, whose corporate headquarters relocated to the nearby suburb of Westlake in 2021, became the title sponsor of the event for a four-year deal starting in 2019.

Previous sponsors were Dean & Deluca (2016–2017), Crowne Plaza (2007–2015), Bank of America (2003–2006), MasterCard (1996–2002), and Southwestern Bell (1989–1994). There was no title sponsor in 1995 or 2018.

The event name had "Colonial" in its title through 2015, when the Crowne Plaza Invitational at Colonial was renamed the Dean & DeLuca Invitational. Even the unsponsored 2018 event used the name Fort Worth Invitational, as opposed to "Colonial National Invitation" which was used the last time the event was without a sponsor back in 1995.

The 2018 tournament, renamed the Fort Worth Invitational, was held through the support of four local corporate supporters that had stepped-in to provide financial support after Dean & DeLuca suddenly pulled-out of a six-year sponsorship agreement. American Airlines, AT&T, XTO Energy Inc. and Burlington Northern Santa Fe Railway agreed to help fund the 2018 tournament to allow time for the PGA TOUR and Colonial Country Club to find a new sponsor.

== Invitational status ==
The Charles Schwab Challenge is one of only five tournaments given "invitational" status by the PGA Tour, and consequently it has a reduced field of approximately 132 players in 2024 (as opposed to most full-field open tournaments with a field of 144 or 156 players). The other four tournaments with invitational status are the Genesis Open, Arnold Palmer Invitational, the RBC Heritage, and the Memorial Tournament. However, the 2020 event was staged with 144 players to help make up for the loss of several tournaments canceled earlier in the year.

Invitational tournaments have smaller fields (between 69 and 132 players), and have more freedom than full-field open tournaments in determining which players are eligible to participate in their event, as invitational tournaments have slightly different criteria for player eligibility in the PGA Tour Priority Ranking System. Furthermore, unlike full-field open tournaments, invitational tournaments do not offer open qualifying (aka Monday qualifying).

== Field ==
The field consists of at least 120 players invited using the following criteria:

1. Colonial winners prior to 2000 and in the last five years
2. Colonial Winners in top 150 of prior year FedEx Cup points list
3. The Players Championship and major championship winners in the last five years
4. The Tour Championship and World Golf Championships winners in the past three years
5. Arnold Palmer Invitational and Memorial winners in the past three years
6. PGA Tour tournament winners since the last Colonial tournament
7. Playing members on the last named U.S. Ryder Cup team
8. Current PGA Tour members who were playing members on the last named European Ryder Cup team, U.S. Presidents Cup team, and International President's Cup team
9. Two players to be selected by the current and former champions of the Colonial tournament (Champions Choices)
10. Top 15 finishers and ties from previous year's Colonial Tournament
11. 12 sponsors exemptions -- 2 from among graduates of Web.com Tour finals, 6 members not otherwise exempt, and 4 unrestricted
12. Top 50 Official World Golf Ranking through the Masters
13. Top 80 from prior year's FedEx Cup points list
14. Members in the top 125 non-member category whose non-WGC points for the previous season equal or exceed the points earned by the player finishing in 80th position on the prior year FedEx Cup points list
15. Top 80 from current year's FedEx Cup points list through the tournament two weeks prior
16. If necessary to complete a field of 120 players, any remaining positions are filled from current year's FedEx Cup points list

Colonial winners prior to 2000 that are not otherwise eligible are in addition to a field of 120.

== Champion's Choice tradition ==
Colonial has a unique PGA Tour tradition known as the Champion's Choice invitation. Each year, former Colonial champions select two deserving young players, who otherwise would be ineligible, to compete in the tournament.

Pros who made their first appearance at Colonial as a Champion's Choice include Al Geiberger, Tom Weiskopf, Craig Stadler, Curtis Strange, Mark O'Meara, Paul Azinger, Davis Love III, and Jordan Spieth. Five Champion's Choices have eventually won the Colonial; Dave Stockton is the only Champion's Choice to win the tournament in the year selected (1967).

== Course layout ==
Hole	1	2	3	4	5	6	7	8	9	Out	10	11	12	13	14	15	16	17	18	In	Total
Yards	581	385	475	248	476	410	480	194	413	3,662	407	639	457	199	456	431	197	399	442	3,627	7,289
Par	5	4	4	3	4	4	4	3	4	35	4	5	4	3	4	4	3	4	4	35	70

== Winners ==
Year	Winner	Score	To par	Margin of victory	Runner(s)-up	Purse (US$)	Winner's share ($)	Ref.
Charles Schwab Challenge
2026	(United States) Russell Henley	268	−12	Playoff	(United States) Eric Cole	9,900,000	1,782,000	
2025	(United States) Ben Griffin	268	−12	1 stroke	(Germany) Matti Schmid	9,500,000	1,710,000	
2024	(United States) Davis Riley	266	−14	5 strokes	(United States) Keegan Bradley (United States) Scottie Scheffler	9,100,000	1,638,000	
2023	(Argentina) Emiliano Grillo	272	−8	Playoff	(United States) Adam Schenk	8,700,000	1,566,000	
2022	(United States) Sam Burns	271	−9	Playoff	(United States) Scottie Scheffler	8,400,000	1,512,000	
2021	(United States) Jason Kokrak	266	−14	2 strokes	(United States) Jordan Spieth	7,500,000	1,350,000	
2020	(United States) Daniel Berger	265	−15	Playoff	(United States) Collin Morikawa	7,500,000	1,350,000	
2019	(United States) Kevin Na	267	−13	4 strokes	(United States) Tony Finau	7,300,000	1,314,000	
Fort Worth Invitational
2018	(England) Justin Rose	260	−20	3 strokes	(United States) Brooks Koepka	7,100,000	1,278,000	
Dean & DeLuca Invitational
2017	(United States) Kevin Kisner	270	−10	1 stroke	(United States) Sean O'Hair (Spain) Jon Rahm (United States) Jordan Spieth	6,900,000	1,242,000	
2016	(United States) Jordan Spieth	263	−17	3 strokes	(United States) Harris English	6,700,000	1,206,000	
Crowne Plaza Invitational at Colonial
2015	(United States) Chris Kirk	268	−12	1 stroke	(United States) Jason Bohn (United States) Brandt Snedeker (United States) Jordan Spieth	6,500,000	1,170,000	
2014	(Australia) Adam Scott	271	−9	Playoff	(United States) Jason Dufner	6,400,000	1,152,000	
2013	(United States) Boo Weekley	266	−14	1 stroke	(United States) Matt Kuchar	6,400,000	1,152,000	
2012	(United States) Zach Johnson (2)	268	−12	1 stroke	(United States) Jason Dufner	6,400,000	1,152,000	
2011	(United States) David Toms	265	−15	1 stroke	(South Korea) Charlie Wi	6,200,000	1,116,000	
2010	(United States) Zach Johnson	259	−21	3 strokes	(England) Brian Davis	6,200,000	1,116,000	
2009	(United States) Steve Stricker	263	−17	Playoff	(South Africa) Tim Clark (United States) Steve Marino	6,200,000	1,116,000	
2008	(United States) Phil Mickelson (2)	266	−14	1 stroke	(South Africa) Tim Clark (Australia) Rod Pampling	6,100,000	1,098,000	
2007	(South Africa) Rory Sabbatini	266	−14	Playoff	(United States) Jim Furyk (Germany) Bernhard Langer	6,000,000	1,080,000	
Bank of America Colonial
2006	(United States) Tim Herron	268	−12	Playoff	(Sweden) Richard S. Johnson	6,000,000	1,080,000	
2005	(United States) Kenny Perry (2)	261	−19	7 strokes	(United States) Billy Mayfair	5,600,000	1,008,000	
2004	(United States) Steve Flesch	269	−11	1 stroke	(United States) Chad Campbell	5,300,000	954,000	
2003	(United States) Kenny Perry	261	−19	6 strokes	(United States) Justin Leonard	5,000,000	900,000	
MasterCard Colonial
2002	(Zimbabwe) Nick Price (2)	267	−13	5 strokes	(United States) Kenny Perry (United States) David Toms	4,300,000	774,000	
2001	(Spain) Sergio García	267	−13	2 strokes	(United States) Brian Gay (United States) Phil Mickelson	4,000,000	720,000	
2000	(United States) Phil Mickelson	268	−12	2 strokes	(United States) Stewart Cink (United States) Davis Love III	3,300,000	594,000	
1999	(United States) Olin Browne	272	−8	1 stroke	(United States) Fred Funk (United States) Paul Goydos (United States) Tim Herron (United States) Greg Kraft (United States) Jeff Sluman	2,800,000	504,000	
1998	(United States) Tom Watson	265	−15	2 strokes	(United States) Jim Furyk	2,300,000	414,000	
1997	(South Africa) David Frost	265	−15	2 strokes	(United States) Brad Faxon (United States) David Ogrin	1,600,000	288,000	
1996	(United States) Corey Pavin (2)	272	−8	2 strokes	(United States) Jeff Sluman	1,500,000	270,000	
Colonial National Invitation
1995	(United States) Tom Lehman	271	−9	1 stroke	(Australia) Craig Parry	1,400,000	252,000	
Southwestern Bell Colonial
1994	(Zimbabwe) Nick Price	266	−14	Playoff	(United States) Scott Simpson	1,400,000	252,000	
1993	(South Africa) Fulton Allem	264	−16	1 stroke	(Australia) Greg Norman	1,300,000	234,000	
1992	(United States) Bruce Lietzke (2)	267	−13	Playoff	(United States) Corey Pavin	1,300,000	234,000	
1991	(United States) Tom Purtzer	267	−13	3 strokes	(United States) David Edwards (United States) Scott Hoch (United States) Bob Lohr	1,200,000	216,000	
1990	(United States) Ben Crenshaw (2)	272	−8	3 strokes	(United States) John Mahaffey (United States) Corey Pavin (Zimbabwe) Nick Price	1,000,000	180,000	
1989	(Australia) Ian Baker-Finch	270	−10	4 strokes	(United States) David Edwards	1,000,000	180,000	
Colonial National Invitation
1988	(United States) Lanny Wadkins	270	−10	1 stroke	(United States) Mark Calcavecchia (United States) Ben Crenshaw (United States) Joey Sindelar	750,000	135,000	
1987	(United States) Keith Clearwater	266	−14	3 strokes	(United States) Davis Love III	600,000	108,000	
1986	(United States) Dan Pohl	205 (Note: Shortened to 54 holes due to rain.)	−5	Playoff	(United States) Payne Stewart	600,000	108,000	
1985	(United States) Corey Pavin	266	−14	4 strokes	(United States) Bob Murphy	500,000	90,000	
1984	(United States) Peter Jacobsen	270	−10	Playoff	(United States) Payne Stewart	500,000	90,000	
1983	(United States) Jim Colbert	278	−2	Playoff	(United States) Fuzzy Zoeller	400,000	72,000	
1982	(United States) Jack Nicklaus	273	−7	3 strokes	(United States) Andy North	350,000	63,000	
1981	(United States) Fuzzy Zoeller	274	−6	4 strokes	(United States) Hale Irwin	300,000	54,000	
1980	(United States) Bruce Lietzke	271	−9	1 stroke	(United States) Ben Crenshaw	300,000	54,000	
1979	(United States) Al Geiberger	274	−6	1 stroke	(United States) Don January (United States) Gene Littler	300,000	54,000	
1978	(United States) Lee Trevino (2)	268	−12	4 strokes	(United States) Jerry Heard (United States) Jerry Pate	200,000	40,000	
1977	(United States) Ben Crenshaw	272	−8	1 stroke	(United States) John Schroeder	200,000	40,000	
1976	(United States) Lee Trevino	273	−7	1 stroke	(United States) Mike Morley	200,000	40,000	
1975	See 1975 Tournament Players Championship							
1974	(United States) Rod Curl	276	−4	1 stroke	(United States) Jack Nicklaus	250,000	50,000	
1973	(United States) Tom Weiskopf	276	−4	1 stroke	(Australia) Bruce Crampton (United States) Jerry Heard	150,000	30,000	
1972	(United States) Jerry Heard	275	−5	2 strokes	(United States) Fred Marti	125,500	25,000	
1971	(United States) Gene Littler	283	+3	1 stroke	(United States) Bert Yancey	125,000	25,000	
1970	(United States) Homero Blancas	273	−7	1 stroke	(United States) Gene Littler (United States) Lee Trevino	125,000	25,000	
1969	(United States) Gardner Dickinson	278	−2	1 stroke	(South Africa) Gary Player	125,000	25,000	
1968	(United States) Billy Casper (2)	275	−5	5 strokes	(United States) Gene Littler	125,000	25,000	
1967	(United States) Dave Stockton	278	−2	2 strokes	(United States) Charles Coody	115,000	23,000	
1966	(Australia) Bruce Devlin	280	E	1 stroke	(United States) R. H. Sikes	110,000	22,000	
1965	(Australia) Bruce Crampton	276	−4	3 strokes	(Canada) George Knudson	100,000	20,000	
1964	(United States) Billy Casper	279	−1	4 strokes	(United States) Tommy Jacobs	75,000	14,000	
1963	(United States) Julius Boros (2)	279	−1	4 strokes	(South Africa) Gary Player	60,000	12,000	
1962	(United States) Arnold Palmer	281	+1	Playoff	(United States) Johnny Pott	40,000	7,000	
1961	(United States) Doug Sanders	281	+1	1 stroke	(Australia) Kel Nagle	40,000	7,000	
1960	(United States) Julius Boros	280	E	1 stroke	(United States) Gene Littler (Australia) Kel Nagle	30,000	5,000	
1959	(United States) Ben Hogan (5)	285	+5	Playoff	(United States) Fred Hawkins	27,300	5,000	
1958	(United States) Tommy Bolt	282	+2	1 stroke	(United States) Ken Venturi	25,000	5,000	
1957	(Argentina) Roberto De Vicenzo	284	+4	1 stroke	(United States) Dick Mayer	25,000	5,000	
1956	(United States) Mike Souchak	280	E	1 stroke	(United States) Tommy Bolt	25,000	5,000	
1955	(United States) Chandler Harper	276	−4	8 strokes	(United States) Dow Finsterwald	25,000	5,000	
1954	(United States) Johnny Palmer	280	E	2 strokes	(United States) Fred Haas	25,000	5,000	
1953	(United States) Ben Hogan (4)	282	+2	5 strokes	(United States) Doug Ford (United States) Cary Middlecoff	25,000	5,000	
1952	(United States) Ben Hogan (3)	279	−1	4 strokes	(United States) Lloyd Mangrum	20,000	4,000	
1951	(United States) Cary Middlecoff	282	+2	1 stroke	(United States) Jack Burke Jr.	15,000	3,000	
1950	(United States) Sam Snead	277	−3	3 strokes	(United States) Skip Alexander	15,000	3,000	
1949	Cancelled due to flooding							
1948	(United States) Clayton Heafner	272	−8	6 strokes	(United States) Skip Alexander (United States) Ben Hogan	15,000	3,000	
1947	(United States) Ben Hogan (2)	279	−1	1 stroke	(Italy) Toney Penna	15,000	3,000	
1946	(United States) Ben Hogan	279	−1	1 stroke	(United States) Harry Todd	15,000	3,000	

Note: Green highlight indicates scoring records.

== Multiple winners ==
Eleven men have won this tournament more than once through 2026.
5 wins

- Ben Hogan: 1946, 1947, 1952, 1953, 1959

2 wins

- Julius Boros: 1960, 1963
- Billy Casper: 1964, 1968
- Al Geiberger: 1975 (TPC), 1979
- Lee Trevino: 1976, 1978
- Ben Crenshaw: 1977, 1990

- Bruce Lietzke: 1980, 1992
- Corey Pavin: 1985, 1996
- Nick Price: 1994, 2002
- Kenny Perry: 2003, 2005
- Phil Mickelson: 2000, 2008
- Zach Johnson: 2010, 2012
