= Keith Clearwater =

American professional golfer (born 1959)

Personal information
- Full name: Keith Allen Clearwater
- Nationality: United States
- Born: September 1, 1959 (age 67) Long Beach, California, U.S.
- Height: 6 ft 0 in (1.83 m)
- Weight: 195 lb (88 kg; 13.9 st)

Career
- Sport: Golf
- College: Brigham Young University
- Turned professional: 1982
- Former tours: PGA Tour; Champions Tour
- Professional wins: 3
- Highest ranking: 76 (January 31, 1993)

Number of wins by tour
- PGA Tour: 2
- Other: 1

Best results in major championships
- Masters Tournament: T39: 1993
- PGA Championship: T48: 1991
- U.S. Open: T31: 1987
- The Open Championship: CUT: 1992

Achievements and awards
- PGA Tour Rookie of the Year: 1987

Keith Allen Clearwater (born September 1, 1959) is an American professional golfer who has won two tournaments on the PGA Tour.

== Early life ==
Clearwater was born in Long Beach, California. He went to Northgate High School in Walnut Creek, California.

== Amateur career ==
He was one of many Californians to attend Brigham Young University in Provo, Utah and play on the school's golf team. In 1981, his junior year, he helped lead BYU to the 1981 NCAA Championship, and was named as a first team All-American. During his tenure at BYU, his teammates included future professional golfers Rick Fehr, Richard Zokol and Bobby Clampett. In his senior year, 1982, he was named as a second team All-American.

== Professional career ==
In 1982, Clearwater turned pro.

In 1987, Clearwater joined the PGA Tour. He won two tournaments on the PGA Tour, both in his rookie season of 1987. He won the prestigious Colonial National Invitation in the spring of that year with a 14-under-par 266, which tied the previous tournament record set by Corey Pavin in 1985. Later in that same season, he won the Centel Classic.

Clearwater has had a moderately successful career in professional golf. He has just over two dozen top-10 tournament finishes in PGA Tour events. His best finish in a major was a T-31 at the 1987 U.S. Open, which included a third round of 64 that tied the Olympic Club course record and remains one shot off of the U.S. Open record.

He also competed on the Champions Tour, but plays the PGA Tour's Colonial National Invitational every year. Most recently, Clearwater was hired by Pauma Valley Country Club, Pauma Valley, California as their Director of Instruction in February 2021.

== Personal life ==
Clearwater lives in Murrieta, California.

== Amateur wins ==
- 1982 North and South Amateur

== Professional wins (3) ==
=== PGA Tour wins (2) ===
| No. | Date | Tournament | Winning score | To par | Margin of victory | Runner(s)-up |
|---|---|---|---|---|---|---|
| 1 | May 17, 1987 | Colonial National Invitation | 67-71-64-64=266 | −14 | 3 strokes | (United States) Davis Love III |
| 2 | Nov 1, 1987 | Centel Classic | 71-68-68-71=278 | −10 | 1 stroke | (United States) Billy Kratzert, (United States) Bob Lohr, (United States) Joey Sindelar |

=== Other wins (1) ===
- 1985 Alaska State Open

== Results in major championships ==
| Tournament | 1980 | 1981 | 1982 | 1983 | 1984 | 1985 | 1986 | 1987 | 1988 | 1989 |
|---|---|---|---|---|---|---|---|---|---|---|
| Masters Tournament | | | | | | | | | CUT | |
| U.S. Open | CUT | | | | | | | T31 | | CUT |
| The Open Championship | | | | | | | | | | |
| PGA Championship | | | | | | | | CUT | CUT | |

| Tournament | 1990 | 1991 | 1992 | 1993 | 1994 | 1995 | 1996 | 1997 | 1998 | 1999 | 2000 |
|---|---|---|---|---|---|---|---|---|---|---|---|
| Masters Tournament | | | | T39 | | | | | | | |
| U.S. Open | | T37 | | T52 | | | | | | CUT | T53 |
| The Open Championship | | | CUT | | | | | | | | |
| PGA Championship | | T48 | T56 | WD | | | | | | | |

Did not play

CUT = missed the half-way cut
WD = Withdrew
"T" = tied

== See also ==
- 1986 PGA Tour Qualifying School graduates
- 2000 PGA Tour Qualifying School graduates
