= Craig Wood (golfer) =

American professional golfer (1901–1968)

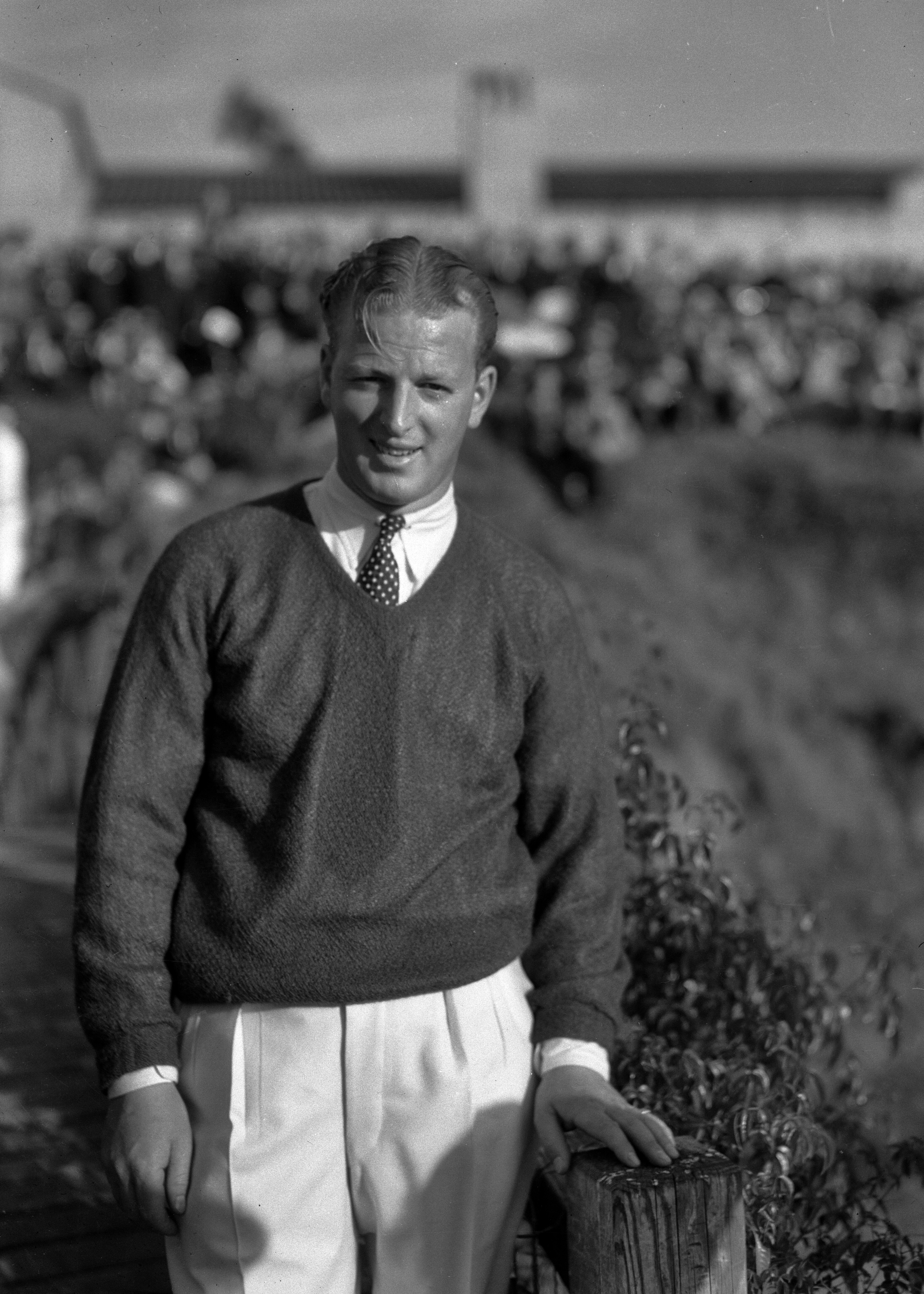
- Wood in 1933

Personal information
- Full name: Craig Ralph Wood
- Nationality: United States
- Born: November 18, 1901 Lake Placid, New York, U.S.
- Died: May 7, 1968 (aged 66) Palm Beach, Florida, U.S.
- Spouse: Jacqueline Valentine (1907–1967)

Career
- Sport: Golf
- College: Clarkson College; Rider College
- Turned professional: 1920
- Former tour: PGA Tour
- Professional wins: 28

Number of wins by tour
- PGA Tour: 20
- Other: 8

Best results in major championships (wins: 2)
- Masters Tournament: Won: 1941
- PGA Championship: 2nd: 1934
- U.S. Open: Won: 1941
- The Open Championship: 2nd: 1933

Achievements and awards
- World Golf Hall of Fame: 2008 (member page)

Craig Ralph Wood (November 18, 1901 – May 7, 1968) was an American professional golfer in the 1930s and 1940s, the winner of 21 PGA Tour titles including two major championships and a member of three Ryder Cup teams (1931, 1933, 1935).

Wood was the first player to lose all four major championships in extra holes. His major wins came late in his career at age 39, winning the first two of 1941, the Masters and U.S. Open.

== Early life ==
Born in Lake Placid, New York, Wood turned professional in 1920 at age 18.

== Professional career ==
Despite his two major championships, he is probably most well known as the victim of Gene Sarazen's famous double eagle in the 1935 Augusta National Invitational (now known as the Masters Tournament). The shot left the two players tied at the end of regulation and Sarazen went on to victory in a 36-hole playoff.

This was Wood's fourth runner-up and third playoff loss in a major in just two years. In the 1933 British Open at St Andrews, Denny Shute had defeated Wood in another 36-hole playoff. In the spring of 1934, Wood was the runner up by a single shot to Horton Smith at the first Masters and later that year he was defeated on the 38th hole by Paul Runyan in the PGA Championship, then a match play event. At the 1939 U.S. Open he birdied the 72nd hole and was again in a playoff, but this time Byron Nelson was the winner, making Wood the first player to lose all four major championships in extra holes. Greg Norman is the only other player to suffer this fate.

At age 39 in 1941, Wood finally beat his "jinx" in noteworthy fashion. He won the eighth 1941 Masters Tournament in April, its first wire-to-wire champion with rounds of 66-71-71-72=280 for a three-shot victory over runner-up Byron Nelson. Two months later, he won the 45th U.S. Open, held at Colonial Country Club in Fort Worth, Texas. His score of 284 (+4) was three strokes ahead of Denny Shute, another on-course nemesis. This was the first time the winner of the Masters had won the U.S. Open in the same year for the first half of the grand slam. Subsequent winners of the first two majors were Ben Hogan (1951, 1953), Arnold Palmer (1960), Jack Nicklaus (1972), Tiger Woods (2002), and Jordan Spieth (2015).

== Death ==
Wood died in Palm Beach, Florida in 1968 at age 66, of a heart attack. He was the second Masters champion to die, preceded by Horton Smith in 1963 and followed by Jimmy Demaret in 1983. Wood and his wife Jacqueline (1907–1967) are buried in North Elba, New York, just south of Lake Placid.

== Awards and honors ==
- In 1954, the Lake Placid Golf and Country Club changed its name to the "Craig Wood Golf Course" in honor of him
- In 2008, Wood was elected to the World Golf Hall of Fame on the PGA Tour ballot

== Professional wins (28) ==
=== PGA Tour wins (20) ===
- 1929 (2) Oklahoma City Open, Hawaiian Open
- 1930 (2) New Jersey PGA Championship, Reddy Tee Tournament
- 1931 (1) Harlingen Open
- 1932 (3) New Jersey PGA Match Play Championship, San Francisco National Match Play Open, Pasadena Open
- 1933 (2) Los Angeles Open, Radium Springs Open
- 1934 (2) Galveston Open Championship, New Jersey Open
- 1936 (1) General Brock Open
- 1938 (1) Augusta Open-Forest Hills
- 1940 (2) Metropolitan Open, Miami Biltmore International Four-Ball (with Billy Burke)
- 1941 (2) **Masters Tournament**, **U.S. Open**
- 1942 (1) Canadian Open
- 1944 (1) Durham Open

Major championships are shown in bold.

=== Other wins (8) ===
Note: This list may be incomplete.

- 1925 Kentucky Open
- 1928 New Jersey PGA Championship
- 1926 Kentucky PGA Championship
- 1929 Pasadena Open (January)
- 1934 Lakes Open
- 1938 New Jersey PGA Championship
- 1942 Metropolitan PGA Championship
- 1943 Golden Valley Four-Ball (with Jimmy Demaret)

== Major championships ==
=== Wins (2) ===
Year	Championship	54 holes	Winning score	Margin	Runner-up
1941	Masters Tournament	3 shot lead	−8 (66-71-71-72=280)	3 strokes	(United States) Byron Nelson
1941	U.S. Open	2 shot lead	+4 (73-71-70-70=284)	3 strokes	(United States) Denny Shute

=== Results timeline ===
Tournament	1925	1926	1927	1928	1929
U.S. Open	T51		CUT	T46	T16
The Open Championship					
PGA Championship					QF

Tournament	1930	1931	1932	1933	1934	1935	1936	1937	1938	1939
Masters Tournament	NYF	NYF	NYF	NYF	2	2	T20	T26	T34	6
U.S. Open	T9		T14	3	DQ	T21	T66	T36		2
The Open Championship				2						
PGA Championship			R32		2		SF	R32		

Tournament	1940	1941	1942	1943	1944	1945	1946	1947	1948	1949
Masters Tournament	T7	1	T23	NT	NT	NT	WD	T53	T43	34
U.S. Open	4	1	NT	NT	NT	NT	CUT		CUT	T27
The Open Championship	NT	NT	NT	NT	NT	NT				
PGA Championship	R32	R32	QF	NT	R16					R64

Tournament	1950	1951	1952	1953	1954	1955	1956	1957	1958	1959
Masters Tournament			59	62	71	62	70	CUT	CUT	CUT
U.S. Open	CUT	T47								
The Open Championship										
PGA Championship										

Tournament	1960	1961	1962	1963	1964
Masters Tournament	WD	CUT		WD	WD
U.S. Open					
The Open Championship					
PGA Championship					

Win
Top 10
Did not play

NYF = tournament not yet founded
NT = no tournament
WD = withdrew
DQ = disqualified
CUT = missed the half-way cut
R64, R32, R16, QF, SF = Round in which player lost in PGA Championship match play
"T" indicates a tie for a place

=== Summary ===
Tournament	Wins	2nd	3rd	Top-5	Top-10	Top-25	Events	Cuts made
Masters Tournament	1	2	0	3	5	7	25	17
U.S. Open	1	1	1	4	5	8	19	14
The Open Championship	0	1	0	1	1	1	1	1
PGA Championship	0	1	1	4	5	9	10	10
Totals	2	5	2	12	16	25	55	42

- Most consecutive cuts made – 21 (1934 PGA – 1944 PGA)
- Longest streak of top-10s – 4 (1939 Masters – 1940 U.S. Open)

== See also ==
- List of golfers with most PGA Tour wins
- List of men's major championships winning golfers
