= Don Iverson =

American golfer (born 1945)

Personal information
- Full name: Donald Iverson
- Nationality: United States
- Born: October 28, 1945 (age 81) La Crosse, Wisconsin, U.S.
- Height: 5 ft 10 in (1.78 m)
- Weight: 185 lb (84 kg; 13.2 st)

Career
- Sport: Golf
- College: University of Wisconsin–La Crosse
- Turned professional: 1968
- Former tour: PGA Tour
- Professional wins: 3

Number of wins by tour
- PGA Tour: 1

Best results in major championships
- Masters Tournament: T29: 1974
- PGA Championship: T6: 1973
- U.S. Open: T35: 1974
- The Open Championship: DNP

Donald Iverson (born October 28, 1945) is an American professional golfer who played on the PGA Tour in the 1970s.

== Early life and amateur career ==
Iverson was born, raised and has lived most of his life in La Crosse, Wisconsin. He attended La Crosse Central High School, where he was a star quarterback on the football team and member of the golf team. He graduated in 1963. As an amateur, he won six La Crosse Tribune County Amateur Golf Championships from 1960–1967. He attended the University of Wisconsin–La Crosse graduating in 1968 with a Bachelor of Science degree in economics. He won the 1966 NAIA Championship.

== Professional career ==
In 1968, Iverson turned professional. He played nine years on the PGA Tour from 1971–1979. The biggest win of his career came at the 1975 B.C. Open; he shot a final round 68 for a four-day total of 274 (10-under-par) to edge David Graham and Jim Colbert by one stroke. Iverson's best year on the Tour was also 1975, when in addition to his win at the B.C. Open, he tied for 37th on the money list with $56,559. His best finish in a major was T-6 at the 1973 PGA Championship where Iverson was a co-leader after both the first and second rounds.

After retiring as a touring professional in 1979, he moved back home to La Crosse, Wisconsin and went to work as a national sales representative for Inland Printing Company.

== Personal life ==
Iverson and his wife, Virginia, have two children, Corie and Merritt.

== Awards and honors ==
- In 1980, Iverson was elected to the UW–La Crosse Hall of Fame.
- In 1988, Iverson was inducted into the Wisconsin State Golf Association Hall of Fame.

== Amateur wins ==
- 1960 Wisconsin Junior
- 1962 Wisconsin Junior
- 1963 International Jaycee Junior
- 1965 CVGA Tournament of Champions
- 1966 Wisconsin Amateur, NAIA Championship
- 1960–1967 six LaCrosse Tribune County Amateurs

== Professional wins (3) ==
=== PGA Tour wins (1) ===
No.	Date	Tournament	Winning score	Margin of victory	Runners-up
1	Sep 1, 1975	B.C. Open	−10 (66-69-71-68=274)	1 stroke	(United States) Jim Colbert, (Australia) David Graham

=== Other wins (2) ===
- 1972 Shreveport Open Classic
- 1977 Maine Open

== See also ==
- Fall 1968 PGA Tour Qualifying School graduates
