= 1941 U.S. Open (golf) =

Coordinates: 32.717°N 97.373°W

Tournament information
- Dates: June 5–7, 1941
- Location: Fort Worth, Texas
- Course: Colonial Country Club
- Organized by: USGA
- Tour: PGA Tour

Statistics
- Par: 70
- Length: 7,035 yards (6,433 m)
- Field: 163 players, 67 after cut
- Cut: 156 (+16)
- Winner's share: $1,000

Champion
- (United States) Craig Wood
- 284 (+4)

Location in the United States
Location in Texas

The 1941 U.S. Open was the 45th U.S. Open, held June 5–7 at Colonial Country Club in Fort Worth, Texas. Craig Wood, who had lost in a playoff at the U.S. Open two years earlier, finally broke through and claimed his first U.S. Open title, three strokes ahead of runner-up Denny Shute in sweltering heat. Eight years earlier, Shute had defeated him in a playoff at the 1933 British Open.

Wood opened the tournament with a 73 in the first round and followed that up with a 71 in the rain-delayed second. Part of a four-way tie for the lead after 36 holes, Wood shot a pair of 70s in the final two rounds, capped by a birdie on the 72nd, to post a 284 total. Only Fort Worth's Ben Hogan managed better than Wood in the final two rounds, but he finished five behind in a tie for third. Denny Shute shot a 287 total to finish three strokes behind Wood in second.

Wood, age 39, was almost forced to miss the tournament due to a nagging back injury he aggravated two weeks earlier. After recording a double-bogey 7 on his first hole of the championship, he considered withdrawing but was convinced to continue by playing partner Tommy Armour. With his win here, Wood became the first to win the first two majors in a season; he won the Masters two months earlier. Prior to 1941, he had several near misses, and had lost all four majors in extra holes.

Tyrrell Garth, a month shy of his 16th birthday, established a new tournament record for youngest competitor. He shot an 80 in the first round and withdrew during the second; his record stood for 65 years, until 2006 (Tadd Fujikawa).

This was the last U.S. Open played for five years, until 1946, due to World War II. Colonial has hosted an annual PGA Tour event since 1946, now known as the Fort Worth Invitational.

== Course layout ==
| Hole | 1 | 2 | 3 | 4 | 5 | 6 | 7 | 8 | 9 | Out | 10 | 11 | 12 | 13 | 14 | 15 | 16 | 17 | 18 | In | Total |
|---|---|---|---|---|---|---|---|---|---|---|---|---|---|---|---|---|---|---|---|---|---|
| Yards | 569 | 395 | 468 | 250 | 469 | 395 | 418 | 198 | 343 | 3,505 | 403 | 593 | 400 | 192 | 455 | 447 | 207 | 406 | 427 | 3,530 | 7,035 |
| Par | 5 | 4 | 4 | 3 | 4 | 4 | 4 | 3 | 4 | 35 | 4 | 5 | 4 | 3 | 4 | 4 | 3 | 4 | 4 | 35 | 70 |

== Round summaries ==
=== First round ===
Thursday, June 5, 1941

| Place | Player | Score | To par |
|---|---|---|---|
| 1 | (United States) Denny Shute | 69 | −1 |
| T2 | (United States) Vic Ghezzi | 70 | E |
| T2 | (United States) Dutch Harrison | 70 | E |
| T4 | (United States) Gene Kunes | 71 | +1 |
| T4 | (United States) Lawson Little | 71 | +1 |
| T4 | (United States) Jug McSpaden | 71 | +1 |
| T4 | (United States) Dick Metz | 71 | +1 |
| T4 | (United States) Jack Ryan | 71 | +1 |
| T9 | (United States) Clayton Heafner | 72 | +2 |
| T9 | (United States) Bill Kaiser | 72 | +2 |
| T9 | (United States) Ted Kroll | 72 | +2 |
| T9 | (United States) Johnny Morris | 72 | +2 |
| T9 | (United States) Henry Ransom | 72 | +2 |
| T9 | (United States) Harry Todd (a) | 72 | +2 |
| T9 | (United States) Bunny Torpey | 72 | +2 |

=== Second round ===
Friday, June 6, 1941

Thunderstorms caused delays in the morning and afternoon, but only a few players did not complete the second round on Friday.

| Place | Player | Score | To par |
|---|---|---|---|
| T1 | (United States) Clayton Heafner | 72-72=144 | +4 |
| T1 | (United States) Lawson Little | 71-73=144 | +4 |
| T1 | (United States) Denny Shute | 69-75=144 | +4 |
| T1 | (United States) Craig Wood | 73-71=144 | +4 |
| T5 | (United States) Dick Metz | 71-74=145 | +5 |
| T5 | (United States) Paul Runyan | 73-72=145 | +5 |
| T7 | (United States) Herman Barron | 75-71=146 | +6 |
| T7 | (United States) Johnny Bulla | 75-71=146 | +6 |
| T7 | (United States) Harold McSpaden | 71-75=146 | +6 |
| T7 | (United States) Byron Nelson | 73-73=146 | +6 |
| T7 | (United States) Henry Ransom | 72-74=146 | +6 |
| T7 | (United States) Sam Snead | 76-70=146 | +6 |

=== Third round ===
Saturday, June 7, 1941 (morning)

| Place | Player | Score | To par |
|---|---|---|---|
| 1 | (United States) Craig Wood | 73-71-70=214 | +4 |
| T2 | (United States) Paul Runyan | 73-72-71=216 | +6 |
| T2 | (United States) Denny Shute | 69-75-72=216 | +6 |
| 4 | (United States) Johnny Bulla | 75-71-72=218 | +8 |
| T5 | (United States) Ben Hogan | 74-77-68=219 | +9 |
| T5 | (United States) Lloyd Mangrum | 73-74-72=219 | +9 |
| T5 | (United States) Gene Sarazen | 74-73-72=219 | +9 |
| T8 | (United States) Herman Barron | 75-71-74=220 | +10 |
| T8 | (United States) Jug McSpaden | 71-75-74=220 | +10 |
| T8 | (United States) Byron Nelson | 73-73-74=220 | +10 |

=== Final round ===
Saturday, June 7, 1941 (afternoon)

| Place | Player | Score | To par | Money ($) |
|---|---|---|---|---|
| 1 | (United States) Craig Wood | 73-71-70-70=284 | +4 | 1,000 |
| 2 | (United States) Denny Shute | 69-75-72-71=287 | +7 | 800 |
| T3 | (United States) Johnny Bulla | 75-71-72-71=289 | +9 | 650 |
| T3 | (United States) Ben Hogan | 74-77-68-70=289 | +9 | 650 |
| T5 | (United States) Herman Barron | 75-71-74-71=291 | +11 | 413 |
| T5 | (United States) Paul Runyan | 73-72-71-75=291 | +11 | 413 |
| T7 | (United States) Dutch Harrison | 70-82-71-71=294 | +14 | 216 |
| T7 | (United States) Jug McSpaden | 71-75-74-74=294 | +14 | 216 |
| T7 | (United States) Gene Sarazen | 74-73-72-75=294 | +14 | 216 |
| T10 | (United States) Ed Dudley | 74-74-74-73=295 | +15 | 125 |
| T10 | (United States) Lloyd Mangrum | 73-74-72-76=295 | +15 | 125 |
| T10 | (United States) Dick Metz | 71-74-76-74=295 | +15 | 125 |
